= Miller (disambiguation) =

A miller is a person who owns or operates a mill which turns grain into flour.

Miller, Miller's, or Millers may also refer to:

- Miller (surname)
  - List of people with surname Miller

== Places ==
=== United States ===
==== Inhabited places ====
- Miller, California, former settlement
- Miller, Indiana
- Miller, Iowa
- Miller, Kansas
- Miller, Kentucky (disambiguation)
- Millers, Maryland
- Miller, Michigan
- Miller, Missouri
- Miller, Nebraska
- Miller's, Nevada, ghost town
- Millers, New York
- Miller, Ohio
- Miller, Oklahoma
- Miller, South Dakota
- Miller Beach, neighborhood of Gary, Indiana
- Miller County (disambiguation)
- Miller Township (disambiguation)

==== Rivers ====
- Millers River, Massachusetts
- Millers River (Middlesex), Massachusetts
- Millers River (Rhode Island)
- Miller River, Washington

=== Other places ===
- Miller (crater), a crater on the Moon
- Miller, New South Wales, Australia
- Miller, Edmonton, Alberta, Canada
- Miller Field (disambiguation)
- Miller Park (disambiguation)

== Biology ==
- Miller (moth) (Acronicta leporina), a species of moth
- Miller, other moths of the genus Agrotis
- The miller, a common name for the fungus Clitopilus prunulus

== Fictional characters ==
- Adam Miller, on the Australian soap opera Neighbours
- Barney Miller, title character on the American television show Barney Miller
- C. Miller, a player character in Call of Duty: World at War
- Cal Miller, a character in the 1980 American disaster movie The Night the Bridge Fell Down
- Chris and Nifty Miller, in the 1986 American fantasy drama film The Barker
- Chuck, David, Judy, and Ronald Miller, in the American teen romantic comedy 1987 movie Can't Buy Me Love
- Daisy Miller, in the novella Daisy Miller by Henry James
- Elaine Miller, character in Almost Famous
- Felicia Miller, a character in Valentine's Day played by Taylor Swift
- Garret Miller, a character in the Ghostbusters franchise
- Jerry Miller, in the film Tammy
- Kazuhira Miller, in Metal Gear series
- Kirsty Miller, a character from the British radio soap opera The Archers
- Lauren Miller, in the American sitcom television series Family Ties
- Leslie Miller, in the 1999 American black comedy mockumentary movie Drop Dead Gorgeous
- Liza Miller, in the American television series, Younger
- Luisa Miller, in the opera Luisa Miller by Giuseppe Verdi
- Marvin Miller (and his parents Jeff and Jenny), a two-year-old in the American comic strip Marvin
- Master Miller, a games series character; see list of recurring Metal Gear characters
- Mrs Miller, a character in the 1971 American TV film Five Desperate Women
- Mrs. Miller, in the 1994 American comedy film Robot in the Family
- Nick Miller, a character in American television series New Girl
- Phil Miller (The Last Man on Earth), in the American television series The Last Man on Earth, played by Will Forte
- Robyn Miller, in "The Miller's Tale" from The Canterbury Tales by Geoffrey Chaucer
- Sandra Miller, a character in the 1993 TV series Journey to the Center of the Earth
- Steve Miller, a character from the 2010 drama film The Last Song
- Windy Miller, in the British children's television show Camberwick Green
- the Miller family from the British television show EastEnders:
  - Aleesha Miller, Darren Miller, Dawn Miller, Demi Miller, Keith Miller (EastEnders), Mickey Miller, Rosie Miller

== Companies ==
- Harry A. Miller Manufacturing Company, an American company of high-performance automotive components, racing engines, and complete racing cars
- Miller (automobile), a former U.S. car maker
- Miller Brewing Company, a U.S. beer company
- Miller Camera Support Equipment, an Australian tripods and fluid heads manufacturer
- Miller's Department Store, was a chain of department stores based in East Tennessee
- Miller Electric, a company that makes arc welding and cutting equipment
- Miller's (publisher), a U.K. publishing company established by William Miller
- Miller's of Tennessee, a defunct U.S. chain of department stores
- RW Miller, a defunct Australian coal, hotel and shipping company
- Miller's Markets, A chain of markets common in the US state of Ohio
- Miller's Woman, a former chain of womenswear in Australia, owned by Mosaic Brands

== Law ==
- United States v. Miller, a 1939 case involving the Second Amendment to the United States Constitution
- Miller v. California, a 1973 case involving the First Amendment to the United States Constitution that resulted in the Miller test of obscenity
- Miller v. Alabama, a 2012 case holding unconstitutional mandatory sentences of life without parole for juveniles
- R (Miller) v Secretary of State for Exiting the European Union, a 2016 case about the right of the UK Government to withdraw from the European Union
- Miller v. Bonta, a 2021 case in California involving the Second Amendment to the United States Constitution

== Sports ==
- Alexander City Millers, a minor league baseball team
- Holyoke Millers, a minor league baseball team
- Mayodan Millers, a minor league baseball team
- Minneapolis Millers, a minor league baseball team
- Minneapolis Millers (AHA), a minor league ice hockey team
- Minneapolis Millers (IHL), a minor league ice hockey team
- Rotherham United F.C., a football (soccer) team in England nicknamed The Millers
- Steinbach Millers, an amateur league ice hockey team

== Other uses ==
- Milling machine
- Miller (typeface), a typeface designed by Matthew Carter in 1997
- The Millers (2013–2015), an American television show

== See also ==
- Fort Miller, California
- Mayor Miller (disambiguation)
- Millar, a surname
- Mill (disambiguation)
