= List of EastEnders characters introduced in 2004 =

EastEnders logo

The following is a list of characters that first appeared in the BBC soap opera EastEnders in 2004, by order of first appearance.

== Wilfred Atkins ==
Wilfred Atkins
- EastEnders character
- Portrayed by: Dudley Sutton
- First appearance: Episode 2688; 4 March 2004
- Last appearance: Episode 2740; 3 June 2004
In-universe information
- Occupation: Conman

Wilfred Atkins, played by Dudley Sutton, is Nana Moon's (Hilda Braid) fiancée, whom she meets on the bus travelling to her holiday in Eastbourne. She brings him back to Walford in March 2004 to meet her grandsons Alfie and Spencer (Shane Richie and Christopher Parker). Alfie is cautious of Wilfred at first, thinking he is only interested in Nana's money, but Wilfred tells Alfie that he is rich and has fallen in love with Nana. Alfie's wife Kat (Jessie Wallace) later agrees that Wilfred can move into The Queen Victoria pub when he and Nana are married.

Alfie is later enraged that Wilfred has not booked a honeymoon, and takes him to the travel agents to book one. Wilfred later admires the war medals of Nana's late husband William Moon (Dickon Tolson), then surprises Nana with the news that he has booked a honeymoon in the West Indies. Alfie welcomes him into the family. On his wedding day, Wilfred gets nervous and tries to run away, only to be caught by Alfie at Walford East station. He confides in Alfie that he is ill, and does not want Nana to become his nurse. Alfie agrees to let Wilfred leave, but when he hugs Wilfred he feels a sharp pain, and opens Wilfred's jacket to reveal William's medals.

Wilfred is exposed as a con artist. Alfie does not want to have to break the news to his grandmother, so he takes Wilfred back to the pub, where he confesses to stealing the medals. Nana reveals that she knew all along and forgives Wilfred, but he flees Walford along with £30,000 that he has conned out of Pat Evans (Pam St. Clement).

== Chrissie Watts ==
Chrissie Watts, played by Tracy-Ann Oberman, first appears in April 2004 as the second wife of the show's "most enduring character", Den Watts (Leslie Grantham), becoming a prominent regular for the next 18 months. In 2005 she is the focus of one of "the programme's biggest and most high-profile narratives" when she kills her husband in a fit of rage during the special 20th anniversary episode. The broadcast, airing on 18 February, was watched by 14.34 million people, with "almost 60% of possible viewers" tuning in to see Chrissie take revenge. The character was credited by former head of BBC Drama Serials, Mal Young, as "anchoring the success of the anniversary storyline", and was described on the news programme BBC Breakfast as the "centrepiece" of the show, with the on-screen drama playing out over the course of the year and culminating in Chrissie's departure in December.

== Jane Beale ==
Jane Beale, played by Laurie Brett, makes her first appearance on 22 June 2004 and soon starts a romance with Ian Beale (Adam Woodyatt). Jane later strays and has an affair with Grant Mitchell (Ross Kemp), though her and Ian overcome this and marry in 2007. Soon after, Ian's adopted son Steven Beale (Aaron Sidwell) returns to Walford and mistakenly shoots Jane in the stomach, leaving her unable to have children. Brett took maternity leave in 2011, and Jane departed on 19 May. Jane returned to screens on 8 November before departing the series on 27 January 2012. The character returned in 2014, before leaving again in 2017. In July 2024, the character returned for a short stint to facilitate for Bobby Beale's (Clay Milner Russell) exit story.

== Eddie ==
Eddie
- EastEnders character
- Portrayed by: Daren Elliott Holmes
- Duration: 2004–2005
- First appearance: Episode 2758; 5 July 2004
- Last appearance: Episode 2892; 18 February 2005
In-universe information
- Occupation: Mobster

Eddie, played by Daren Elliott Holmes, made his first appearance on 5 July 2004 as the right-hand man and personal bodyguard of Andy Hunter (Michael Higgs), the reigning crime kingpin of Albert Square in Walford - a fictionalized borough in East London. Throughout his duration on the show, Eddie helps Andy expand his criminal empire and gangland reign upon Walford. This involves Andy ordering Eddie to get the upper hand over his rivals, as well as celebrate his wedding to local businesswoman Sam Mitchell (Kim Medcalf) - which is nearly ruined after her cousin Billy (Perry Fenwick) and ex-boyfriend Minty Peterson (Cliff Parisi) try to warn Sam's mother Peggy (Barbara Windsor) about Andy's scheme to extract control of the Mitchell family assets. However, they fail and Andy later sends Eddie to warn off Billy and Minty. It is at this point where Eddie has crossed path with Andy's best-friend Dennis Rickman (Nigel Harman) and sworn nemesis Alfie Moon (Shane Richie).

Towards Christmas 2004, Eddie observes Andy employing Billy's friend Paul Trueman (Gary Beadle) into the business so he could expand his criminal empire on drug dealing. When Eddie approaches the rendezvous point to carry out Andy's preparations, however, Andy deduces that Paul has set them up in a police sting operation - which prompts him to have Eddie leave the area and get rid of all evidence that traces their would-be involvement in the apparent drug operation. Eddie does so and Andy later has Paul killed in retribution, which inevitably sparks a conflict between Paul's adopted father Patrick (Rudolph Walker) and Andy himself when Paul's body is recovered the following month.

Soon afterwards, Andy orders Eddie to investigate Alfie's two cousins Jake (Joel Beckett) and Danny (Jake Maskall) upon becoming enemies with them. In doing so, Eddie finds out that Jake and Danny are henchmen working for their mob boss Johnny Allen (Billy Murray). He subsequently informs Andy, who thereupon alerts Johnny to the square so he can take care of Jake and Danny. It is then Johnny begins to usurp Andy from his gangland reign, up to the point where Andy rants against Johnny in front of Eddie and their fellow neighbours in The Queen Victoria public house. Andy's outburst towards Sam prompts Johnny and his friend Den Watts (Leslie Grantham), the pub's landlord, to ban Andy from the pub and throw him out along with Eddie. Thereafter Andy tells Eddie that he plans to con Johnny out of his £750,000 in a criminal transaction between them. While Eddie attempts to warn Andy about crossing Johnny with his plan, Andy insists that it is doing ahead regardless. This causes Eddie to observe Andy's go-ahead with his plot by having Danny help out, after Jake was originally authorized to help until Johnny cut him out of getting involved at the last minute.

On the night Andy puts his scheme into motion, Eddie appears to contribute after helping Andy flee Walford with the £750,000. However, as they drive out of the city, Eddie pulls over near a motorway bridge and claims that he needs to go to the toilet. Andy gives him permission to go, but it later turns out Eddie has actually betrayed Andy by alerting Johnny of his plan and location. Off-screen, Eddie witnesses Johnny and Jake arrive at where Andy is to intercept him - with Jake retaking Johnny's £750,000 from Andy whilst Johnny himself orders Andy to take a walk with him on the motorway bridge. This causes Andy to discover Eddie's betrayal too late, and he reluctantly does so. Moments later, with Jake and Eddie watching from their cars, Johnny kills Andy by forcing him off the motorway bridge - which causes Andy to fall to his death. Johnny then returns to his car with Jake and they flee from the scene, though not before Johnny tells Eddie "I don't wanna see you again"; which implies that Johnny has ordered Eddie to leave Walford for good in order to destroy all traces of his involvement to Andy's death. Eddie complies with Johnny's orders regardless, and leaves Walford for good.

The character Eddie makes his final appearance on 18 February 2005, the show's 20th anniversary episode where Andy is ironically killed off towards the broadcast's climax.

== Rowan Kennedy ==
Rowan Kennedy
- EastEnders character
- Portrayed by: Natasha Williams
- Duration: 2004, 2008–2011, 2016
- First appearance: Episode 2780; 11 August 2004
- Last appearance: Episode 5307; 27 June 2016
In-universe information
- Occupation: Nurse

Rowan Kennedy, played by Natasha Williams, is a nurse that appears on a recurring basis over 12 years intermittently. She originally appears on 11 August 2004 when she treats Dot Branning (June Brown) after she is diagnosed with kidney cancer. She next appears four years later on 31 October 2008 when she treats Max Branning (Jake Wood) after he is run over by a car. She later treats Stacey Slater (Lacey Turner) after a fall, and Max again when he gets his finger stuck in a bowling ball. On 20 December 2010, she treats Ryan Malloy (Neil McDermott) when he is hospitalised after being poisoned by his wife Janine (Charlie Brooks). A month later, on 20 January 2011, she appears when Connor Stanley (Arinze Kene) is in hospital after being assaulted by Bianca Butcher (Patsy Palmer).

Kennedy's most recent appearance was on 27 June 2016, when she tends to Amy Mitchell (Abbie Burke), when her father, Jack Branning (Scott Maslen) suspects she has eaten cocaine. Amy says her pet rabbit had eaten her mother, Roxy Mitchell's (Rita Simons) "sherbert", and nurse Kennedy asks if she consumed any herself, to which Amy says she hasn't. She then tells Jack that social services will want to speak to them. Williams, who played Kennedy, returned to EastEnders in 2024 as a different character named Dolores, who was seen in flashback scenes as a victim of serial sex-offender Pastor Clayton (Howard Saddler), whom he raped in 2001.

== Sarah Cairns ==
Sarah Cairns
- EastEnders character
- Portrayed by: Alison Pargeter
- First appearance: Episode 2792/2793; 3 September 2004
- Last appearance: Episode 2821; 22 October 2004
In-universe information
- Occupation: Barmaid

Sarah Cairns, played by Alison Pargeter, is a barmaid in Angie's Den nightclub. She first appears when Martin Fowler (James Alexandrou) and his friends Mickey Miller (Joe Swash), Spencer Moon (Chris Parker), Ronny Ferreira (Ray Panthaki) and Tariq Larousi (Nabil Elouahabi) all go out for the evening to have a pretend to have a stag party to get free drinks. Meanwhile, a drunk Tariq is seen flirting with a barmaid named Sarah who works at Angie's Den nightclub, Tariq already knows Sarah by her name suggesting that there was a past connection but Sarah appears to be disinterested. Later on, A drunk Martin starts flirting with Sarah, She mentions to Martin that her job agency often send her to work in the Walford area, and always takes cabs there due to safety, implying previous barmaid work in the vicinity. The following morning, Martin wakes up in Sarah's bed. Martin admits to Sarah that he has made a mistake as he is married, and Sarah seems to back off. However, it soon emerges that Sarah is mentally unstable and begins stalking Martin as well as sending him text messages declaring her love for him. Sarah and Martin both meet up at Angie's Den again, where Sarah believes it's fate. She thinks Martin is just like her and can't resist her. Martin explains to Sarah that it's not possible that he could be with her. Sarah asks Martin if he still wants her, but Martin confesses that he loves Sonia. Sarah believes that love is about sharing, but Martin insists he loves Sonia. Sarah questions Martin on why he hasn't told Sonia about her, and Martin lies, saying that he has and Sonia has forgiven him. However, Martin tells Sarah not to see him again.

On the day of the wedding of Andy Hunter (Michael Higgs) and Sam Mitchell (Kim Medcalf), Sarah continues sending Martin text messages, saying that she likes his smart suit as a warning that she is in Walford spying on him. As Sarah drives off, Martin runs outside his house, chases after Sarah's car, and throws his mobile phone on the floor, and smashes it up in anger. Martin tries to hide from Sarah in the cafe, but she sees him and enters the cafe, Sarah asks Martin why he hasn't responded to her texts, thinking that he might be in a coma. Martin tells Sarah that his mobile phone is broken. Martin tells Sarah that he was hiding from her to see if she was watching him. Martin confronts Sarah about watching through the window of his house on the day of the wedding and texting him about what he was wearing. Sarah admits to Martin that she was only trying to tease him and apologizes. They mention that they both need to get back to work. Sarah suggests that they hang out after to meet Sonia. Martin explains that Sonia will be busy working. Sarah suggests meeting up the next day, but Martin says Sonia is busy. Sarah then suggests that she and Martin meet up after work, and Martin initially declines. However, Sarah says she'll go straight to his house, which makes Martin agree to meet her at Angie's Den nightclub. Unbeknownst to Martin, Sarah was actually planning a date with Martin at Angie's Den nightclub.

Martin is ready to confront Sarah at Angie's Den nightclub, but he seeks advice from Alfie Moon (Shane Richie), who advises him to keep his distance. Martin decides to meet Sarah anyway, feeling trapped. Later at the club, whilst Martin and Sarah are at the club, Sarah and Kareena Ferreira (Pooja Shah) are both seen waving to each other indicating a friendship. Sarah reveals to Martin that her ex-husband Tony cheated on her which lead to them being divorced. Martin explains to Sarah again that his married and that they should not see each other anymore. Sarah manipulates Martin, accusing him of lying about sleeping with her. Martin walks away. Then Sarah follows him outside the club. Martin calls his relationship with Sarah a mistake and asks Sarah to leave him alone. Then Martin walks away, leaving Sarah in tears. She becomes angry. Sarah continues to watch Martin and his wife, Sonia Fowler (Natalie Cassidy), in Walford. Whilst Martin and Sonia are out, Sarah spies through the Fowler's window again, Sarah's fixation on Sonia intensifies. She starts to follow Sonia around Walford, even to the salon. After Sonia leaves the salon, Sarah positions herself by the road waiting for Sonia to see. In a desperate act, Sarah deliberately runs out in front of a van hoping Sonia will see. Sonia is a nurse, so she looks after Sarah, and they become friends. Meanwhile, Sarah convinces herself that Martin loves her and that he will leave Sonia to be with her. Martin keeps the truth about Sarah from Sonia, but Sarah tells Martin's family she is dating a "certain" married man.

Martin goes a quiz night event at the Queen Vic, and Sarah goes to the Fowler's house, and spends the evening with Sonia. As they both have a drink together, Sarah finds out from Sonia about her ex-boyfriend Jamie Mitchell (Jack Ryder), and Sarah also finds out that Martin accidentally killed him two years prior. Later on that evening, Sarah goes to find Martin and tells him that Sonia has told her everything, and Sarah also tells Martin that she understands, it's guilt over killing Jamie. Then Sarah also tells Martin that she can't watch him chuck his life away after Jamie's, tells Martin it's sick, and also tells Martin to think about it. Sarah also tells Martin, not to do this for her but to do it for himself.

In October 2004, Sarah decides to play a treasure hunt on Martin by leaving him unwanted gifts from her. Martin confronts Sarah in the park, where she had planned a surprise picnic. He questions Sarah about the gifts, Sarah explains that she got the idea from a book, and gives Martin an unwanted ring, Sarah suggests that Martin should put the ring in a special box, but Martin rejects the idea, saying that their relationship is not special. They argue, Martin gets angry, then smashes up the picnic. He tells Sarah that it's over and warns her to stay away. Martin walks away. Sarah calls Sonia, then leaves Walford.

A couple of weeks later, Sarah returns to Walford and lies to the Fowlers saying that her flat is flooded. The next day, Martin confesses to Sarah that he can't sleep and begs her to go. Later, Sarah lies to Martin, pretending to apologize, saying she will leave. They both share a final kiss. Sarah pretends to say goodbye, but she never left, and brought the Fowlers some dinner instead. A couple of days later, Martin is under pressure and goes to the police, but they don't take any notice. Later confesses to Martin's mother Pauline Fowler (Wendy Richard) that it is Martin. Martin finds the pressure intolerable and reports Sarah to the police, but they do not believe him. While he is out, Pauline "falls" off a stepladder, and Sarah disappears. Martin tracks her down and threatens her until she confesses that she pushed Pauline. He tells Sarah he will kill her if she shows her face again. Sarah calls the police and Martin spends most of the day at the police station. During this time, Sarah goes to the Fowlers' house to see Sonia. Martin phones Sonia whilst he is still at the police station, but Sarah answers and cuts the phone wire, preventing Martin from talking to Sonia. At home, Sonia asks Sarah who's on the phone. Sarah lies, claiming it's a wrong number. Sarah also lies to Sonia about getting mugged the previous night and falsely claims that they got the culprit who did it. Sonia gets worried when Martin doesn't call, but Sarah lies to Sonia again, saying he is out drinking with his friend Mickey somewhere exciting. They both have tea. Sarah locks the front and back door of the Fowlers' house as part of her plan to hold Sonia hostage.

Sarah reveals to Sonia that she knows about Martin's family history, including his father, Arthur Fowler, going to prison, getting released, then dying after, his brother Mark Fowler (Todd Carty) having AIDS, and his sister, Michelle Fowler (Susan Tully), emigrating. Sarah also brings up the relationship between Martin and Sonia that started after Jamie's death. During the conversion, Sarah reveals to Sonia that she found out from Martin's mother Pauline about Martin's feelings towards his daughter, Bex Fowler, with them both fighting about what was going to happen to her. Later, Sarah manipulates and warns Sonia that her marriage to Martin will end badly, as Sarah warns that the little things will begin to annoy them and they will start to row about pointless things, and their rows will get bigger, as Sarah knows deep down that both Martin and Sonia are really disappointed with each other as a married couple, due to Sarah also knowing deep down that Martin only married Sonia because of his guilt of accidentally killing Sonia's ex-boyfriend Jamie two years prior. Then Sarah warns Sonia that their disappointment will tear them both apart, and Sarah tells Sonia of Martin's deceit. When Martin arrives, he finds that the front and back doors of his house or locked, so Martin kicks the back door down to save Sonia from Sarah. Martin apologises to Sonia and promises it meant nothing and that it will never happen again.

When Sonia forgives him, Sarah refuses to leave the house with a knife in hand, she accuses Martin of just being like the others," implying a repeated harassment and assault by verious men whilst working as a barmaid, she believes that Martin was different because he was the one who never touched her up, and she felt safe with him, leading her to believe that their relationship is worth fighting for," This profounded her mental instability stemming from past traumatic experiences. Then finally, Sarah admits that Martin fell asleep in her bed, but that they did not have sex. Sarah realises she can never be with Martin so she stabs him in his stomach with a pen knife. During the fight, Sonia picks up a fruit bowl, Sarah falls unconscious, and Jim Branning (John Bardon) walks in and finds Sarah unconscious, Sonia tells him to call for an ambulance for Martin. Then Sarah is committed to a mental institution, and both Martin and Sonia start to move on and continue with their marriage, putting this behind them.

Radio Times included Sarah in their feature profiling 'bunny boilers' and of her duration they stated: "If she is not a regular on her way to being written out, she is a guest who appears, causes havoc, and then vanishes again. [...] Sarah was one such, a barmaid in Angie's Den who stalked, harassed and finally stabbed Martin Fowler when he refused to dump Sonia. Last heard of in an institution."

== Keith Miller ==
Keith Miller, played by David Spinx, arrives with his partner Rosie (Gerry Cowper), their twins Darren (Charlie G. Hawkins) and Demi (Shana Swash), joining Rosie's son Mickey (Joe Swash) and moving into 27 Albert Square. He cannot read and is work-shy, tending to sit around watching television all day, making excuses to Rosie as to why he does not go and find employment. Yet Rosie yearns for them to get married. However Keith's reluctance to commit and his failure to get a job lead to Rosie leaving Walford in July 2006, along with Demi and her daughter Aleesha.

== Demi Miller ==
Demi Miller, played by Shana Swash, is the daughter of Keith and Rosie Miller (David Spinx and Gerry Cowper), and the twin sister of Darren (Charlie G. Hawkins). She moves to Albert Square with her family in September 2004, joining her half brother Mickey (Joe Swash). Aged 13 when she first arrives, Demi becomes the talk of the Square due to her pregnancy. She gives birth to her daughter Aleesha Miller in October.

== Darren Miller ==
Darren Miller, played by Charlie G. Hawkins, is the son of Keith and Rosie Miller (David Spinx and Gerry Cowper), and the brother of Demi (Shana Swash). He moves to Albert Square with his family in September 2004, joining his half brother Mickey (Joe Swash). Hawkins discussed his character in 2004: "Darren's a bit of a rough kid. He is a great character to play. There are resemblances of myself in there, although that is a matter of opinion. It is good to play someone like that, where you can have a laugh".

== Clint ==
Clint
- EastEnders character
- Portrayed by: Huggy Leaver
- Duration: 2004–2006
- First appearance: Episode 2794; 6 September 2004
- Last appearance: Episode 3183; 7 July 2006
In-universe information
- Sisters: Rosie Miller
- Nephews: Mickey Miller; Darren Miller
- Nieces: Dawn Swann; Demi Miller

Clint (real name Beverly) is a recurring character played by Huggy Leaver. He appears from 2004 to 2006 as Rosie Miller's (Gerry Cowper) brother.

Clint first arrives in his old ice cream van, loaded with all the Millers' possessions. The ice cream van bears the somewhat dubious logo of Clint's Creamy Whip. He comes to Walford to help out his family whenever they need him. He is also seen when Mike Swann (Mark Wingett), Rosie's ex-husband, is staying with the Millers and Keith (David Spinx) needs some support. His last appearance is when he helps Rosie to move back out of the Square.

Clint's ice cream van however makes a reappearance around August bank holiday 2007. Clint is on holiday so Mickey and Keith are left to mind the van. They use the van to sell ice creams to fund a DIY project of painting Summer Swann's nursery. Eventually, Clint gives the van to his nephew Darren (Charlie G. Hawkins).

== Rosie Miller ==
Rosie Miller , played by Gerry Cowper, Her first appearance is 9 September 2004 and she was axed in 2006, with her final scenes airing in July 2006. Rosie is the mother of Mickey Miller (Joe Swash), Dawn Swann (Kara Tointon), Demi Miller (Shana Swash) and Darren Miller (Charlie G. Hawkins). Described as "hardworking", she is heavily protective over her family and makes enemies such as Pauline Fowler (Wendy Richard).

== Tommy Grant ==
Tommy Grant
- EastEnders character
- Portrayed by: Robert Cavanah
- First appearance: Episode 2800; 16 September 2004
- Last appearance: Episode 2838; 22 November 2004
In-universe information
- Daughters: Helen Grant

Tommy Grant, played by Robert Cavanah, is the much older boyfriend of Vicki Fowler (Scarlett Johnson) who is attracted to Vicki's stepmother Chrissie Watts (Tracy-Ann Oberman). They kiss and Tommy arranges for them to meet in the toilets in the Queen Victoria pub. He strips naked and Chrissie steals his clothes, exposing him (as a cheat, and literally exposing him). He then runs away through the market, naked.

The next day, as he gets into a taxi to the airport, Vicki's father Den Watts (Leslie Grantham) gets into the taxi with him and takes him to Angie's Den night club, where he pins him down and warns him to leave Walford and never return. Tommy now lives in Thailand.

== Ray Taylor ==
Ray Taylor
- EastEnders character
- Portrayed by: Dorian Lough
- Duration: 2004–2005
- First appearance: Episode 2825; 29 October 2004
- Last appearance: Episode 2992; 12 August 2005
In-universe information
- Wife: Trisha Taylor
- Sons: Leo Taylor
- Granddaughters: Aleesha Miller

Ray Taylor, played by Dorian Lough, is the abusive father of Leo (Philip Dowling) and husband of Trisha (Cathy Murphy). He hates Keith Miller (David Spinx) from a business deal gone wrong, leaving him and Trisha £3,000 in debt, and so is horrified when Keith's daughter Demi (Shana Swash) gives birth to Leo's daughter, Aleesha (Freya and Phoebe Coltman-West). He angrily leaves £50 and tells Leo it will be the last time he sees Aleesha and bans Leo from having contact with the Millers. Ray later drags Leo and Trisha from the church when they attend Aleesha's christening.

When Trisha and Ray plan to move away to Scotland with Leo, he runs away with Demi and Aleesha. Leo takes a heroin overdose just before they are found, and Ray is last seen at the hospital when Leo dies from the overdose.

== Aleesha Miller ==
Aleesha Miller
- EastEnders character
- Portrayed by: Freya and Phoebe Coltman-West
- Duration: 2004–2006
- First appearance: Episode 2825; 29 October 2004
- Last appearance: Episode 3183; 7 July 2006
In-universe information
- Father: Leo Taylor
- Mother: Demi Miller
- Grandfathers: Ray Taylor; Keith Miller
- Grandmothers: Trisha Taylor; Rosie Miller
- Uncles: Mickey Miller; Darren Miller
- Aunts: Dawn Swann
- First cousins: Summer Swann; George Trott

Aleesha Miller is born on the show on 29 October 2004, and is played by twins Freya and Phoebe Coltman-West.

Aleesha is the infant daughter of teenagers Demi Miller (Shana Swash) and Leo Taylor (Philip Dowling). Aleesha's godparents are Demi's older brother Mickey Miller (Joe Swash) and Pauline Fowler (Wendy Richard), whose heart softens towards Demi' family after accompanying Demi to hospital for Aleesha's birth. Aleesha is the centre of an ongoing feud between Demi's parents Keith and Rosie Miller (Gerry Cowper) and Leo's parents Ray and Trisha Taylor, with she, Demi and Leo bear the brunt of the turmoil. Demi and Leo take her with them when they run away together. They leave her with Pauline when they have to move into a squat. This leads to Leo's death from a heroin overdose, when Demi takes some heroin to numb her pain and Leo overdoses because he thinks she is dead. Aleesha leaves Walford with Rosie and Demi in July 2006 to live in the Cotswolds.

== Leo Taylor ==
Leo Taylor
- EastEnders character
- Portrayed by: Philip Dowling
- Duration: 2004–2005
- First appearance: Episode 2825; 29 October 2004
- Last appearance: Episode 2992; 12 August 2005
In-universe information
- Father: Ray Taylor
- Mother: Trisha Taylor
- Daughters: Aleesha Miller

Leo Taylor, played by Philip Dowling, is Demi Miller's (Shana Swash) boyfriend. He first appears in October 2004 visiting his and Demi's new born baby daughter Aleesha (Freya and Phoebe Coltman-West). His father, Ray (Dorian Lough), who has hit him, furiously drags Leo away from the hospital after grudgingly leaving £50.

In May 2005, the Millers return to their former home in a block of flats whilst a rat problem in the square is being dealt with. Demi is reluctant, as it means she is likely to see Leo. Upon their arrival, Leo's father, Ray, and his wife, Trisha (Cathy Murphy), are the first people they see, and they receive a cold reception. Whilst taking Aleesha for a walk, Demi is teased by some of her brother Darren's (Charlie G. Hawkins) old friends, who mock her and refer to her as "Vicky Pollard". Upon heading back to the flats, Demi sees Leo and tries to escape in a lift, but Leo stops her. They realise their split had been due to their parents' meddling and denying contact between the two, and they reunite. Demi tells Leo that it is Aleesha's christening the following day. Despite appearing reluctant, Leo and Trisha attend the christening; however, the service is interrupted by Ray, who viciously drags his wife and son away whilst a heartbroken Demi looks on. The christening continues back at Clint's (Huggy Leaver) flat, and Demi and Leo meet later that evening from their balconies. As the feud between the Millers and the Taylors escalates, Leo plans to run away, and begs Demi to come with him. Demi agrees, but Leo abandons her when she insists on taking Aleesha. Demi returns to Walford, devastated, but is delighted when she meets Leo near the swings. Leo promises her he will keep in contact, and will wait as long as it takes to be with her.

Leo, Demi and Aleesha run away, and Leo starts dealing drugs. Demi takes some of the drugs to numb her pain and she passes out. Leo returns to her and thinks she has died, so takes a heroin overdose and dies in hospital.

Leo and Demi's storyline was likened to Romeo and Juliet by Jane Simon of the Daily Mirror.

== Stacey Slater ==
Stacey Slater, played by Lacey Turner, made her first appearance on 1 November 2004. The character is introduced as a feisty and troublesome teenager, an extension of the already established Slater clan. She features in numerous high-profile storylines, including abortion, drug abuse, mental illness, an affair with her father-in-law Max (Jake Wood) and the murder of Archie Mitchell (Larry Lamb). In 2010, Stacey is involved in a love triangle with local resident Janine Butcher (Charlie Brooks) and Ryan Malloy (Neil McDermott), the father of her daughter Lily. Janine discovers that she murdered Archie and blackmails her, which forces Stacey to flee the country with Lily on Christmas Day 2010.

== Freddie Slater ==
Freddie Slater (also Mitchell), played by twins Alex and Tom Kilby, was conceived in late 2003 when his mother, Little Mo Slater (Kacey Ainsworth), was raped by her friend, Graham Foster (Alex McSweeney). Her refusal to abort the baby caused the breakdown of her marriage to her husband Billy Mitchell (Perry Fenwick). He was reintroduced in September 2022, now being played by Bobby Brazier.

== Jean Slater ==
Jean Slater, played by Gillian Wright, is the mother of Stacey Slater (Lacey Turner). She appears in December 2004 briefly and in December 2005. She returns as a recurring character in June 2006 and begins making regular appearances from November 2006 when she moves in with the Slater family in Walford. Jean departs on 13 January 2011 when she admits herself into a psychiatric hospital after becoming severely depressed following Stacey's departure. She returns to Walford on 29 March 2011 and moves into the Queen Vic with Kat Slater (Jessie Wallace) and Alfie Moon (Shane Richie).

== Jake Moon ==
Jake Moon, played by Joel Beckett, first appears with his brother Danny Moon (Jake Maskall) from 30 December 2004. He is notable for his alliance with gangster Johnny Allen (Billy Murray), his obsession with Johnny's daughter Ruby (Louisa Lytton), his feuds with Phil Mitchell (Steve McFadden), Grant Mitchell (Ross Kemp), Dennis Rickman (Nigel Harman) and Sean Slater (Robert Kazinsky), and his relationship with Chrissie Watts (Tracy-Ann Oberman).

== Danny Moon ==
Danny Moon, played by Jake Maskall, makes his first appearance on 30 December 2004 with his brother Jake (Joel Beckett). After Danny's employer Johnny Allen (Billy Murray) is beaten severely by Dennis Rickman (Nigel Harman), he orders Danny to murder Dennis. The murder soon leads to Danny leaving Walford. He returns briefly in March 2006 for Get Johnny Week, which ultimately leads to his demise.

== Others ==
Character	Date(s)	Actor	Circumstances
Keith Makepeace	13 January	Julian Parkin	A Trading Standards inspector who visits Bridge Street market on 13 January 2004. Martin Fowler (James Alexandrou) is worried that the weights on his stall are not accurate, so Sonia Jackson (Natalie Cassidy) helps him to fix them, and he passes the inspection.
Michael Nee	3 February	Christopher Fry	A young trainee taxi driver who expresses interest in buying Charlie Slater's (Derek Martin) taxi from him, as he is due to sit his taxi driver exams the following week. As his wife, Val, is pregnant, Charlie lets him have the taxi for £700 instead of the advertised £1000, because he reminds Charlie of himself.
Dom Shaw	9-12 February	Lloyd McGuire	A board member on the Walford Community Centre committee. When Sharon Watts (Letitia Dean) wants to hold a 2004 Valentine's Day ball in the Community Centre. she needs to get an alcohol license, but Community Centre manager Derek Harkinson (Ian Lavender) is unable to obtain one due to a previous criminal conviction for growing cannabis. When Shaw discovers Derek's conviction, he sacks him, but is persuaded to reinstate him by Martin Fowler (James Alexandrou). He later obtains a license for the Community Centre himself.
Jill Green	17 February-2 March; 16 January 2007-8 May 2008	Elizabeth Rider	A nurse who works at Walford General Hospital. She first appears in February 2004 when Ronny Ferreira (Ray Panthaki) has a kidney transplant. She appears again in January 2007 after Deano Wicks (Matt Di Angelo) and Chelsea Fox (Tiana Benjamin) are in a car crash. She is seen again in May 2008 after Roxy Mitchell (Rita Simons) runs over Pat Evans (Pam St. Clement).
JJ	19-24 February	David Anthony	A teenage runaway who breaks into the Abercorn Bed & Breakfast, disturbing the proprietor Patrick Trueman (Rudolph Walker) and his fiancée, Yolande Duke (Angela Wynter). When confronted, JJ tells the couple that he is 16 and is living on the streets, so they soften, letting him stay when he offers to help out around the place. Patrick's stepson Paul Trueman (Gary Beadle) takes a dislike to JJ and is suspicious of him. When Yolande offers to wash JJ's jacket, he is evasive and it is revealed he stole some jewellery from her. Paul informs JJ's social worker, Mattie George (Chizzy Akudolu), who arrives to collect JJ and reveals he is only 14 and has run away from care. Patrick and Yolande are furious with Paul and later visit JJ in care and learn that his mother is in prison. This experience leads to their decision to foster.
George Wakefield	23 February	Andrew Bridgemont	A counsellor at Walford General Hospital who speaks to Tariq Larousi (Nabil Elouahabi) before one of his kidneys is removed for his half brother Ronny Ferreira's (Ray Panthaki) kidney transplant operation.
Mattie George	23 February	Chizzy Akudolu	A social worker who collects JJ, a teen runaway, from the bed and breakfast run by Patrick (Rudolph Walker) and Yolande Trueman (Angela Wynter). She takes him back to the care home where he lives, after Paul Trueman (Gary Beadle) reports to Social Services that he is there.
Robert	12–16 April	Paul Antony-Barber	Robert is Derek Harkinson's (Ian Lavender) former lover. He appears as the entertainment when Derek arrives at a holiday camp with Pauline Fowler (Wendy Richard), Patrick Trueman (Rudolph Walker), Yolande Duke (Angela Wynter), Jim (John Bardon) and Dot Branning (June Brown). Derek and Robert discuss the past and talk about how Derek left several months into their relationship and spend the night together. When the time comes to leave, Derek says he will call Robert but Robert tells him he knows he will not.
Simon Gott	22 April	Johann Myers	A nurse who cared for Mark Fowler (Todd Carty) in the days leading up to his death from AIDS-related illness, and informs Mark's brother Martin (James Alexandrou) of Mark's death over the telephone on 12 April 2004. He appears at Mark's funeral, and gives Martin a letter written by Mark giving him advice on how to live his life.
Robert MacLean	29 April	Gordon Kane	A fire safety officer who inspects Angie's Den following a fire there. According to Den Watts (Leslie Grantham) he is a "jobsworth", but the inspection goes well and MacLean approves the reopening of the club.
Carol	29 July	Ashley McGuire	
Jase	2-16 August (7 episodes)	Sonny Muslim	Members of the Community Centre basketball team that Paul Trueman (Gary Beadle) and Derek Harkinson (Ian Lavender) are coaching.
Matt	2-12 August (6 episodes)	Albey Brookes	Members of the Community Centre basketball team that Paul Trueman (Gary Beadle) and Derek Harkinson (Ian Lavender) are coaching.
Koffi	6-12 August (5 episodes)	Omari Carter	Members of the Community Centre basketball team that Paul Trueman (Gary Beadle) and Derek Harkinson (Ian Lavender) are coaching.
George	10-16 August (4 episodes)	David Shane	A friend of Juley Smith (Joseph Kpobie) that comes to live with him and Gus Smith (Mohammed George) temporarily.
David Collins	19 August-31 December	Dan Milne	The first husband of Jane Collins (Laurie Brett) who has Huntington's disease and lives in a hospice. Jane keeps David a secret from her new boss Ian Beale (Adam Woodyatt), but one day Ian demands to know why she is infrequent with her work, and Jane takes him to meet David. Ian regularly visits him until David dies on New Year's Eve 2004, leaving Jane heartbroken, as she had had sex with Ian prior to his death. In January 2008, it is revealed that Jane's brother Christian Clarke (John Partridge) had been in love with David.
Matt Hill	30 September	Ben Joiner	An events promoter who Kat Moon (Jessie Wallace) meets in a nightclub, shortly before leaving her husband Alfie (Shane Richie) and moving away from Walford. After she leaves, Matt arrives at The Queen Victoria pub looking for Kat, as she had arranged to meet him there. Alfie is agitated by this, and gets progressively angry with Matt, until he physically throws him out of the pub.
Deirdre Foster	2-5 November	Patricia Brake	The mother of Graham Foster (Alex McSweeney), who attends his rape trial in November 2004. When Deirdre speaks to Little Mo Mitchell (Kacey Ainsworth) about her son Freddie (Alex and Tom Kilby), she reveals that Graham has two daughters from his failed marriage who he never sees. Kate Mitchell (Jill Halfpenny) passes this information onto Mo's legal team, who ask Graham about it under cross examination. Graham lies and is caught out, then berates his mother for telling Mo. Graham is then found guilty. Little Mo feels sorry for Deirdre and keeps in contact with her until she and Freddie leave Walford in May 2006.
Roger	4–5 November	Russell Boulter	Kat Moon (Jessie Wallace) meets Roger in a bar. He invites her back to his home, where they have sex.
DI Christopher Riddick	20 December–10 November 2005	Roger Griffiths	A local police officer who first appears following Paul Trueman's (Gary Beadle) arrest for running drug errands for Andy Hunter (Michael Higgs). Riddick urges Paul to stop protecting Andy and implicate him and Paul does so. When Paul is later murdered, Riddick and his colleague DS Jones question Andy, who has an alibi for where he had been at the time. Riddick's last appearance is when Chrissie Watts (Tracy-Ann Oberman) is arrested for the murder of her husband Den (Leslie Grantham).
