= Mickey Miller =

Fictional character from EastEnders

- EastEnders character
- Portrayed by: Joe Swash
- Duration: 2003–2008, 2011, 2024
- First appearance: Episode 2500; 15 April 2003
- Last appearance: Episode 7028; 10 December 2024
- Introduced by: Louise Berridge (2003); Bryan Kirkwood (2011); Chris Clenshaw (2024)
In-universe information
- Occupation: Businessman; Taxi driver Market trader
- Father: Mike Swann
- Mother: Rosie Miller
- Stepfather: Keith Miller
- Sisters: Dawn Swann
- Half-brothers: Darren Miller
- Half-sisters: Demi Miller
- Grandmothers: Nora Swann
- Uncles: Clint
- Nephews: George Trott
- Nieces: Aleesha Miller; Summer Swann

Mickey Miller is a fictional character from the BBC soap opera EastEnders, played by Joe Swash. He first appeared on 15 April 2003 as a guest character. Mickey proved popular and the executive producer Louise Berridge made him a full-time member of the cast. The character is portrayed as a wheeler-dealer, involved in various money-making scams. A family was built around the character in 2004 when the other Millers moved to Albert Square. It was announced on 25 February 2008 that the characters of Mickey and his stepfather Keith had been axed by EastEnders' executive producer Diederick Santer. Mickey left on 1 July 2008. In September 2011, it was announced Swash would reprise his role for the departure storyline of his screen brother Darren and appeared for two episodes on 19 and 20 September 2011. Mickey made a second two-episode return stint between 9 and 10 December 2024, with Swash's return being an unannounced surprise.

== Character creation and development ==
=== Creation ===
The role of Mickey Miller was played by Joe Swash. The actor had originally auditioned for the part of Spencer Moon, which was eventually cast to Christopher Parker. However, the BBC bosses saw potential, and six months later, Swash was offered the part of Spencer's friend, Mickey.

The character was originally supposed to appear in only six episodes, but Mickey proved so popular with viewers that the soap's executive producer, Louise Berridge, decided to make him into a regular character. Swash has commented, "I'm pleased it happened that way, I have done it on my own merit rather than coming in as part of a family. It's a bit more special."

The BBC has described Mickey as a "lovable character" and "a happy-go-lucky wide boy." They continued, "Mickey is always on the look-out for a scam and a chance to make some easy money".

=== Introduction of family ===
For his first year in the soap, little was known about the character's background, which Swash commented on in an interview with the Sunday Mirror in February 2004: "It's weird because we don't know anything about Mickey's background. I was filming Kat and Alfie's wedding and I thought, 'Hang on, where's my family? Why have I abandoned them on Christmas Day to go to some wedding?' But I'm sure it'll all become clear. I think they're going to get in some other characters around Mickey, some family and friends, so we'll find out more about him."

In April 2004, the casting team held workshops, screen tests and script readings with the potential actors for Mickey's family. Shana Swash, the sister of Joe Swash, was cast as Mickey's younger half sister Demi Miller. Other family members included stepfather Keith (David Spinx), mother Rosie (Gerry Cowper) and half brother Darren (Charlie G. Hawkins). The family were publicised as "troublemakers" who were joining "in order to drum up conflict with existing characters." Louise Berridge said, "This lot are trouble. Even the dog is dodgy [...] They're set to cause havoc all over the square...". The family's introduction in September 2004 followed a survey in The Mirror newspaper which suggested that 57% of EastEnders viewers thought the soap had lost its appeal.

Mickey as he appeared in 2004.

Joe Swash has revealed that giving Mickey a family was not the producers' original plan for the character, but he was pleased when he was told of the development one year prior to their introduction: "Before, I was in and out all the time. I didn't really know where I stood as an actor. Now that the family are here, I feel like Mickey's a more regular character. I'm really happy about it [...] I didn't know exactly what they'd be like until about three or four months ago. They're really different which I think is good. I'm really pleased with them [...] they're really close. They won't hear a bad word said about each other. They'll kid each other in private, but in public they rally round and stick up for each other [...] [Mickey's] a bit of a mummy's boy."

The following year, Mickey's family was completed by the introduction of his elder sister Dawn Swann (Kara Tointon), and his con-artist father Mike Swann (a guest character played by Mark Wingett), who both made their first appearance in a special week of off-set episodes, set in France in September 2005. In the storyline, Mickey went to France with some of his friends to visit his sister, and was surprised to see his estranged father, who had abandoned him as a child.

=== Development ===
As a "wheeler-dealer", Mickey bonded particularly well with another dodgy dealer on the Square, Mo Harris (Laila Morse). Swash has commented, "It's natural for Mickey and Mo to be close because they're so similar. They're into the same things and doing business." Their interaction was mostly used for comedic purposes. In 2004, the duo were featured in a special plot to highlight the BBC's fundraising event Sport Relief, which tackles poverty and disadvantage, both in the UK and internationally. On-screen, Mickey competed in the Fitness First Sport Relief Mile, to raise money via sponsoring. As part of the storyline, Mo encouraged Mickey to keep the sponsorship money for himself, though Mickey eventually did "the right thing", donating the money to charity. Commenting on the storyline, Swash said, "Mickey is always trying to make money through some scam or another. But this time he has realised that there are people in this country and around the world who are much worse off than he is and he is determined to do his bit to help raise money for Sport Relief and help improve the lives of others."

Relationships were featured in the character's narrative, initially with Kareena Ferreira (Pooja Shah), in 2004. Kareena had taken a hiatus from the serial and returned two months later with what was billed as a "sexy new vamp look" — part of the producers attempt to popularise the much-criticised Ferreira family. Despite most of the male characters showing an interest in the new-look Kareena, she opted for Mickey. Swash said, "[Mickey]'s always liked [Kareena]. His eyes nearly pop out of his head when she returns! I think they'd make a good couple because they're chalk and cheese." The relationship hit various setbacks. When Mickey discovered Kareena had taken cocaine, he contemplated finishing with her, leaving Kareena to be comforted by Mickey's business partner and Kareena's drug dealer, Juley Smith (Joseph Kpobie). Despite weathering these problems, it was a brief reprieve as the relationship ended the episode following their reconciliation in March 2005, when Kareena left the serial with her family. In reality, the entire Ferreira family had been axed by executive producer Kathleen Hutchison. Despite promising to stay for Mickey's sake, Kareena changed her mind at the last minute and left. Mickey's next relationship was with "bad girl" Li Chong (Elaine Tan) in 2007, a fellow wheeler-dealer. The characters' storylines mainly concentrated on money-making schemes, including Li's cannabis farm, and her attempt to "pimp" Mickey as a male escort; however, the relationship ended when Mickey started getting too serious, and Li left the serial in July 2007 when the character was written out.

In February 2008, it was announced that Mickey and his stepfather Keith were being axed from EastEnders. The characters were two of several axed by executive producer Diederick Santer that year. Others included Gus Smith, Steven Beale, and Honey Mitchell. Their axing led to further disbandment of the Miller/Swann family. Both Mickey and Keith survived the axe in 2006 when Rosie and Demi Miller were written out. Darren Miller and Dawn Swann, the only remaining family members, were kept on.

Swash had been forced to take a three-month break from the serial after he contracted meningoencephalitis — a rare form of viral meningitis, which makes the brain swell up. EastEnders' writers were reported to be "frantically reworking scripts" to explain Mickey's sudden disappearance.

After being involved in a high-profile storyline that saw the Millers' home burned down in a gas explosion in June 2008, Mickey departed the serial two weeks later, joining his mother and sister for a new start. He departed on 1 July 2008.

In September 2011, it was reported that Swash would reprise the role of Mickey the following week as part of a storyline focusing on Mickey's brother, Darren (Hawkins). Mickey's reappearance for two episodes was scripted to coincide with Darren's exit storyline. Mickey appeared from 19 September 2011.

In 2016, Swash expressed an interest in reprising the role of Mickey. He reiterated the sentiment after hosting EastEnders: The Six in 2023.

He returned, with no prior announcement, in the episode broadcast on 9 December 2024, as part of a storyline surrounding Bridge Street Market. Swash departed the following episode.

== Storylines ==
=== Backstory ===
Mickey is the son of Mike Swann (Mark Wingett) and Rosie Miller (Gerry Cowper). Mike left the family when Mickey was just three years old. He grew up with his sister Dawn Swann (Kara Tointon) and later his half siblings Demi (Shana Swash) and Darren Miller (Charlie G. Hawkins). He has always considered his mother's long-term partner, Keith Miller (David Spinx), to be his father, and uses his surname.

=== 2003–2008 ===
Mickey is first seen in Walford in 2003, selling dodgy goods to Spencer Moon (Christopher Parker) and he is later involved in similar money-making scams with fellow wheeler-dealer Mo Harris (Laila Morse). To earn extra money, he works as a builder and sells trinkets on Bridge Street market, aided by his business partner, Juley Smith (Joseph Kpobie). Mickey begins a relationship with Kareena Ferreira (Pooja Shah) in 2004. Mickey falls for Kareena, but he is incensed in 2005 when he discovers that she has been using cocaine, supplied by Juley. When Kareena sees Stacey Slater (Lacey Turner) attempting to seduce Mickey, she turns to Juley for comfort, and a fight breaks out when Mickey catches Juley attempting to kiss her. Mickey and Kareena manage to work through their problems, but shortly after Kareena leaves Walford with the rest of her family, despite previously promising Mickey that she will stay with him.

When Mickey visits his sister Dawn in France in 2005, he was surprised to discover that she is living with their biological father, Mike. Mickey is unimpressed with his father's sudden return; he refuses to forgive Mike for his prior neglect, and they fight when Mike makes derogatory comments about Rosie. Mike tries to make excuses for his absence, but Mickey refuses to believe him. They eventually call an uneasy truce, but Mike alienates his son further when he tries to con his friend Minty Peterson (Cliff Parisi) out of his life savings. Mickey enters into a relationship with Li Chong (Elaine Tan) in 2007, and they eventually both move into Gus Smith's (Mohammed George) flat. Li often tests the relationship, infuriating Mickey by growing cannabis in their closet, and then involving him in a money-making scam by advertising him as a male escort without his consent. With persuasion, Mickey agrees to do the male escorting, but Li proves too jealous of his flirtations with other women, so their scam soon ends. Li abruptly ends the relationship when Mickey starts getting too serious for her.

Mickey becomes the victim of bullying from Sean Slater (Robert Kazinsky) in May 2008, who does such things as assaulting Mickey and vandalising his property. Mickey is too scared to take any action against Sean, and relies on his sister's boyfriend, Jase Dyer (Stephen Lord), for protection. On 18 June 2008 he is knocked out when Dr. May Wright (Amanda Drew) hits him over the head with a crowbar, whilst trying to steal Dawn's baby, Summer. When Micky awakes, he manages to stop May from absconding with Summer, but she subsequently causes a gas explosion, and the Millers' house goes up in flames. May is killed in the explosion. Mickey, Dawn and Summer are trapped in a first floor bedroom. When Mickey attempts to pass Summer out the window to the awaiting crowd below, he loses consciousness and drops her, though she is caught by Jase. Dawn pushes an unconscious Mickey out the window, saving his life. Mickey discovers a letter from Rosie, offering Keith a job as a concierge at her home in the Cotswolds. All of the Millers are angry at him for not acknowledging the letter, and Mickey decides to take the job instead as he says there is nothing left for him in Walford. Later, along with Keith and their dog Genghis, Mickey leaves Walford after an emotional farewell at The Queen Victoria pub.

=== 2011 ===
In September 2011, Mickey returns for Darren's wedding to Jodie Gold (Kylie Babbington). He attends the stag night and flirts with Jodie's friend Poppy Meadow (Rachel Bright) and accidentally reveals to her that Darren has had sex with bridesmaid Lauren Branning (Jacqueline Jossa). Mickey helps Darren prepare for the wedding the following day and arranges for a car to drive them to the register office. But Darren's guilt over having sex with Lauren causes him to call the wedding off. Mickey goes for drinks at the pub with Darren and his wedding guests. He tells Darren that he has grown into a young man and is proud of him, before leaving.

=== 2024 ===
Mickey returns to Walford in December 2024, having heard about the prospect of Bridge Street market closing. He offers market inspector Honey Mitchell (Emma Barton) a cheque to help save the market, explaining that Walford has always felt like home. He reveals that he now runs a successful chain of eco-friendly B&Bs in the Cotswolds with Rosie and Dawn and is married with three children. When Mo and Kim Fox (Tameka Empson) despair that their photographer for their Walford naked Christmas calendar has let them down Mickey reveals he has a professional camera and offers to photograph the market traders for the calendar. Mo persuades Mickey to join the shoot as Mr December and when Kim posts teaser links Rosie phones Mickey to say their bookings have doubled. Mickey then reminisces with Mo, telling her the real reason for coming back to Walford was to thank her for taking him under her wing when he was a teen with no prospects. Mo tells him she is proud of the man he has become and after saying their goodbyes Mickey heads back home.

== Reception ==
The character, originally intended for one week's worth of episodes, proved popular with viewers, and was turned into a regular because of this.

In 2005, critic for The Mirror Jim Shelley branded Mickey a moron and one of EastEnders' weakest characters. During a period of heavy media criticism aimed at EastEnders in 2004, Shelley stated that the serial's "Tiresome obsession with petty crime" was one of the reasons for its decline in quality, with Mickey listed as one of the soap's "myriad criminals."

Writing about his 2024 return stint, Laura Denby of Radio Times wrote that it was "joyous" and "delivered some much-needed fun" in comparison to darker storylines that were unfolding at the time. She continued by considering scenes between Mickey and Mo to be "heartwarming" and concluded: "While this marked the end of Joe Swash's delightful comeback, we'd certainly love to see him return in the future. What a treat to see his lovable alter ego once more".
