= Keith Miller (EastEnders) =

Fictional character from EastEnders

- EastEnders character
- Portrayed by: David Spinx
- Duration: 2004–2008
- First appearance: Episode 2794; 6 September 2004
- Last appearance: Episode 3605; 1 July 2008
- Introduced by: Louise Berridge
In-universe information
- Sons: Darren Miller
- Daughters: Demi Miller
- Stepsons: Mickey Miller
- Stepdaughters: Dawn Swann
- Grandsons: George Trott
- Granddaughters: Aleesha Miller

Keith Miller is a fictional character from the BBC soap opera EastEnders, played by David Spinx. He made his first appearance on 6 September 2004. Throughout his tenure, he was shown to be a lazy, unmotivated and jobless character who sits around watching television all day. Keith was branded lazy by many critics, but despite his characterisation, Spinx's acting was well received and the character was liked.

== Casting and development ==
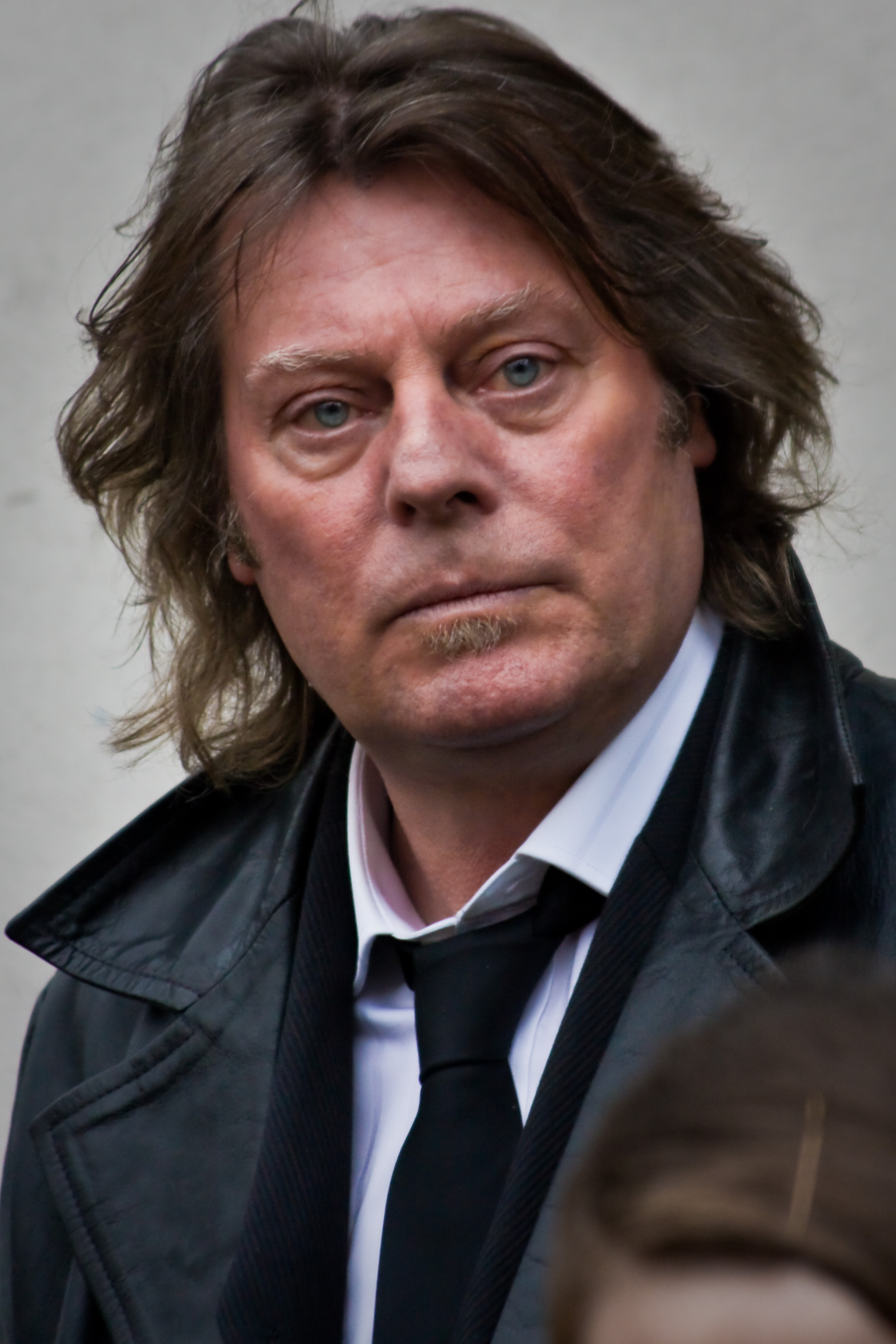
David Spinx was cast as the father of the 'controversial' Miller family.

In July 2004, The Sun reported that a controversial family of lowlifes would be joining EastEnders in an attempt to boost ratings. It was said that they would make the Slater family "look like royalty". Their casting was confirmed a month later when executive producer, Louise Berridge, commented: "I'm delighted to introduce the Miller family, who will be joining Mickey on Albert Square in September, but I warn you - this lot are trouble". She added: "Even the dog is dodgy. They're set to cause havoc all over the Square, and by the end of their first week the sparks will be flying - literally". The family initially consisted of father Keith, mother Rosie Miller (Gerry Cowper), eldest son Mickey Miller (Joe Swash), twins Demi (Shana Swash) and Darren Miller (Charlie G. Hawkins) and their mangy Irish Wolfhound dog, Ghengis.

Upon the casting announcement, The BBC described Keith as a "good natured know-it-all who lives his life through the documentaries he watches on television." It was also said that he "rules his family from his safety of his armchair, shirking responsibility and hard work at any opportunity." Spinx said on his new role: "I'm really enjoying playing Keith, he's a great character. I'm looking forward to developing his character over the coming months."

Spinx had also played two other roles on EastEnders, prior to this. In 1999, he played Sharkey, who was a prisoner that knew Matthew Rose (Joe Absolom) and Steve Owen (Martin Kemp), and at another point, he played a driver for Barry Evans' (Shaun Williamson) cab firm.

In February 2008, after four years on the soap, it was announced that executive producer, Diederick Santer, had axed Keith. Santer also made the decision to axe Swash as Mickey, alongside him, as he felt the two had "run out of steam" and that there was nothing left for the characters to do on the series. Spinx's final appearance aired on 1 July 2008.

In 2011, it was announced that Rosie and Keith's son, Darren, would be leaving the soap. After this announcement was made, Spinx said about a possible return, "Darren is indeed the last of the Millers, so I don't know how that works out for the rest of us who might have wanted to return at some point." He also made it clear that he would love to return if he was asked back, stating, "It would have been nice if he'd had a little wedding and we could've all turned up and had a reunion. I enjoyed my time on EastEnders immensely and of course I would go back."

== Storylines ==
Keith arrives with his partner, Rosie (Gerry Cowper), their twins, Darren (Charlie G. Hawkins) and Demi (Shana Swash), and the family dog, Ghengis, joining Rosie's son, Mickey (Joe Swash), and moving into 27 Albert Square. They are later joined by Demi's newborn baby, Aleesha (Freya Coltman-West), Rosie's daughter, Dawn Swann (Kara Tointon), and Dawn's daughter, Summer Swann. Keith, who does not work and spends his time watching documentaries on television, has his incapacity benefits stopped when Stacey Slater (Lacey Turner) catches him on CCTV moving heavy boxes and reports him for benefit fraud. However, he remains unemployed, and it is revealed that he is illiterate, but, his family encouraged him to learn to read and write. Rosie drops several hints that she wants Keith to propose, but he eventually leaves her when he discovers that she plans to leave him for her ex-husband, Mike Swann (Mark Wingett), and he moves in with Garry Hobbs (Ricky Groves) and Minty Peterson (Cliff Parisi). He later forgives Rosie when she begs for another chance and moves back in with her. Mike moves out, but, leaves a message for Dawn on the Millers' answering machine. Keith deletes the message, as he does not want Mike to have anything to do with the family. Mike's mother, Nora Swann (Pamela Cundell), later dies in hospital and they have no way of contacting Mike to let him know. Rosie kicks Keith out and he moves in with Gus (Mohammed George) and Juley Smith (Joseph Kpobie). Keith desperately wants Rosie back and knows that the only thing he can offer her is marriage. He proposes and they get back together, but, Keith tries to delay the wedding, as he is not really interested in getting married. He later realizes that nothing will really change after they get married and soon changes his mind.

Rosie does not want to put off the wedding any longer and the ceremony takes place at Walford Register Office. Keith arrives late with mud on his suit, but, Rosie cannot go through with the wedding and jilts Keith halfway through the ceremony. Keith decides to change his ways and help more around the house. However, this does not change Rosie's mind. She tells Keith she is no longer in love with him, and is taking a job in the Cotswolds, and taking Darren, Demi and Aleesha with her. She prepares to leave but Darren does not want to go, so Rosie convinces Keith to make Darren leave by saying he is not interested in his son. However, Darren is upset and decides to go, and when Rosie sees how upset he is, she allows him to stay, revealing that Keith was lying. Keith wins on the lottery but loses the ticket. The next day Dawn, Mickey and Darren are furious at him so he agrees to try to get a job. However, he changes his mind, but lies to Dawn; when she, Mickey and Darren discover the lie, they throw him out of the house, even though he has found a job as a road sweeper. He moves in with Masood Ahmed (Nitin Ganatra), who owes him a favor. May Wright (Amanda Drew) sets the Millers' house on fire after her attempts to kidnap Summer. Keith was supposed to be on the lookout for May but was revising for a pub quiz in The Queen Victoria. Wracked with guilt, he goes into the burning building and rescues Dawn. Mickey discovers a letter from Rosie offering Keith a job working as a concierge at the hotel she was working at in the Cotswolds. Keith, however, has kept this letter hidden from his family for over a month. Angry that he has not followed up to contact Rosie about the job, Mickey applies for the job instead. Keith admits to Dawn that he still loves Rosie but cannot take the risk accepting the job and being rejected by her. As Mickey is set to leave, a newly groomed Keith, along with Genghis, tells Mickey he has decided to accept the job after all and that he is coming with him. They leave for the Cotswolds, leaving Darren, Dawn and Summer in Walford. Dawn later reveals that Keith and Rosie have reconciled.

== Reception ==
After Keith and Rosie arrived on the soap, Nancy Banks-Smith, from The Guardian, said that Keith is "something between a ne'er-do-well and a never-well. He enjoys ill health which prevents gainful labour". Digital Spy's Dek Hogan praised Spinx's acting in August 2005 after his part in a storyline that sees Demi go missing. He hoped that his part in the story would be remembered when the nominees for award ceremonies are being picked. However, in 2007, Digital Spy journalist Kris Green opined that Keith is a useless character who he thought would be axed in the near future. After it transpires that Keith is illiterate, a storyline sees him learning to read and write. The Guardian's Alan Wells criticised the storyline as he felt that it was too brief. He felt that Keith's journey to becoming fully literate was shown to be too "effortless". Wells noted how Keith had several long absences from being onscreen, which he felt had made the storyline feel non-existent.

In 2022, Kyle O'Sullivan, from The Mirror, deemed the family as "chaotic" and said the members were "troublemakers" and also mentioned that they were instantly fighting with existing families, such as the Fowlers and Slaters. O'Sullivan also said that fans had a lot of anger towards the family's axings. He also described Keith as "lazy". MyLondon's Angie Quinn wrote: "EastEnders viewers are sure to remember Rosie Miller and her lazy husband Keith who moved onto Albert Square in 2004 with their children Mickey, Dawn, and twins Demi and Darren. Within minutes of their arrival, the family was branded unruly and received anything but a warm welcome from their neighbours. However, viewers of the BBC One soap instantly fell in love with the rowdy clan as we all followed their drama and scandal throughout the 2000s. And although it's been nearly 20 years since the Millers arrived, they are still adored to this day." Nicole Douglas from OK! referred to Keith as "Albert Square's token sloth", while Daily Mirror's Kyle O'Sullivan described him as a "sofa-bound layabout" and remarked that the character spent his entire four-year tenure "on his bum".
