= Demi Miller =

Fictional character from the BBC soap opera EastEnders

- EastEnders character
- Portrayed by: Shana Swash
- Duration: 2004–2006
- First appearance: Episode 2794; 6 September 2004
- Last appearance: Episode 3183; 7 July 2006
- Introduced by: Louise Berridge
In-universe information
- Father: Keith Miller
- Mother: Rosie Miller
- Brothers: Darren Miller
- Half-brothers: Mickey Miller
- Half-sisters: Dawn Swann
- Daughters: Aleesha Miller
- Uncles: Clint
- Nephews: George Trott
- Nieces: Summer Swann

Demi Miller is a fictional character from the BBC soap opera EastEnders, played by Shana Swash. She made her first appearance on 6 September 2004 and last appearance on 7 July 2006, when she was axed by EastEnders executive producer Kate Harwood.

== Creation and development ==
In August 2004, it was announced that a new family was to be introduced to EastEnders. Louise Berridge, the executive producer, commented: "I'm delighted to introduce the Miller family, who will be joining Mickey on Albert Square in September, but I warn you - this lot are trouble." She added: "Even the dog is dodgy. They're set to cause havoc all over the Square, and by the end of their first week the sparks will be flying - literally."

Lacey Turner also auditioned for the role of Demi before being cast as Stacey Slater, later that year.

It was announced in February 2006 that Swash and co-star Gerry Cowper had been axed from EastEnders by John Yorke. "Gerry and Shana have been enormous assets and go with our best wishes" said a spokesman, adding that there is a "massive" storyline had been planned for their exit.

== Storylines ==
Demi arrives in Walford at the age of 13 and immediately becomes the focus of local gossip due to her pregnancy. She is feisty and likes to cause trouble with her twin brother Darren (Charlie G. Hawkins). Nearly two months after her arrival, Demi collapses in agony in the playground after her water breaks. Scared and alone, she begs Pauline Fowler (Wendy Richard) to help her. With Pauline's help, Demi gives birth to Aleesha Miller (Freya and Phoebe Coltman-West) on 29 October 2004. Later that evening, Aleesha's father and Demi's boyfriend Leo Taylor (Philip Dowling) arrives with his father Ray (Dorian Lough). Ray is extremely hostile, and Leo is told he is to have no further contact with Demi or Aleesha.

In May 2005, the Millers return to their former home while a rat problem in the square is being dealt with. Demi is reluctant, as it means she is likely to see Leo. Soon after their arrival, Demi takes Aleesha for a walk and sees Leo. They realise their split has been due to their parents meddling and denying contact between the two, and they reunite. Demi tells Leo that it is Aleesha's christening the following day. Despite appearing reluctant, Leo and his mother Trisha (Cathy Murphy) attend the christening, however, the service is interrupted by Ray, who viciously drags his wife and son away. Demi and Leo meet later that evening from their balconies. As the feud between the Millers and the Taylors escalate, Leo plans to run away, and begs Demi to come with him. Demi agrees, but Leo abandons her when she insists on taking Aleesha. Demi returns to Walford but is delighted when she meets Leo near the swings. Leo promises her he will secretly continue to see her.

When Leo's parents plan to take him to live in Scotland, Demi and Leo take Aleesha and run away. The young family then live in a squat, struggling to afford to survive. Demi realises that the only way to secure her daughter's safety is to send her back home. She phones Pauline and tells her to meet her at the church Aleesha was christened at, where she hands over her daughter in a tearful farewell. Leo begs Demi to let him sell drugs to make some money. Reluctantly, Demi agrees, and soon turns to heroin herself to numb the pain. Leo finds a poster of him and Demi, and realises their families are looking for them. Leo races back to the squat to tell Demi and finds her unconscious with the heroin by her side. Believing she'd killed herself; he overdoses on the remaining heroin just as Demi wakes up. Leo collapses in her arms just as Trisha and Demi's parents, Keith Miller (David Spinx) and Rosie Miller (Gerry Cowper) find them. Leo dies later in hospital in August 2005. Demi is reunited with her family and goes back into school. In October 2005, she celebrates Aleesha's first birthday, and she is also joined by her older half-sister, Dawn Swann (Kara Tointon).

Rosie plans to move away to the Cotswolds with Darren, Demi and Aleesha to take on a new job as a housekeeper and start a new life without Keith. Darren decides to stay in Walford, but Demi wants to raise Aleesha somewhere different from Albert Square. She leaves Walford with Rosie and Aleesha on 7 July 2006.

== Reception ==
In August 2005, a storyline aired in which Demi and her boyfriend Leo run away to a squat and start dealing drugs for money to feed their daughter. This results in Leo taking a fatal overdose of heroin, and therefore was described as "Shakespearean", with the story being compared to that of Romeo and Juliet. Swash stated that due to the age gap between her and Dowling, she was unhappy about kissing him, and said, "I didn't want to do it and I got really upset about it." The storyline was mainly praised by viewers and organisations such as The National Missing Persons Helpline (NMPH), with more than 70,000 calls being made. The charity's general manager went on to say, "We believe that EastEnders are showing a realistic portrayal of a missing teen. Callers to our dedicated Helpline are often in the most extreme of situations and face life or death decisions whilst away from the family home."
