= Swash (surname) =

Swash is a surname. Notable people with the surname include:

- Joe Swash (born 1982), English actor and television presenter
- Shana Swash, English actress
