= Nicola Cowper =

British actress

- Born: Nicola Jane Cowper; 21 December 1967 (age 58); London, England
- Occupation: Actress
- Years active: 1981–present
- Partner: Tony McCann
- Children: 2

Nicola Jane Cowper (born 21 December 1967) is a British actress. Cowper is the younger sister of twin actresses Gerry Cowper and Jackie Cowper. Cowper made an impression as a film actress in her early career, but she is best known for her work on British television, in particular her role as D.S Helen Diamond in BBC's Dangerfield.

== Career ==
Cowper's career began in the 1980s. She made early appearances on television in programmes such as Break in the Sun (1981), S.W.A.L.K (1982), A Game of Soldiers (1983) and Minder (1984) and then went on to appear in several feature films. Her film credits include Winter Flight (1984), Dreamchild (1985); Underworld (1985); Lionheart (1987) and Journey to the Center of the Earth (1989). Leading filmmakers David Puttnam and Francis Ford Coppola tipped Cowper "for the top" after she appeared in the American films Lionheart and Dreamchild— her performance in Dreamchild has been described as "excellent" and "impressive". However, it has since been commented that Cowper "never went on to consolidate her career" and "fairly much vanished into occasional appearances on British television."

Cowper has since appeared in a variety of British television series, which includes: Inspector Morse (1991); Rides (1992–1993); Casualty (1992); Holby City (2000); The Bill; Devices and Desires (1990); as Deborah Wade in the BBC's Real Men (2003); as Edith West in The Grand (1998) and Judge John Deed (2007), among others. She has also played the recurring character Gina Williams—the sister of Cindy Beale (Michelle Collins)—in BBC's EastEnders on four occasions—she first appeared in 1998, then returned briefly in 1999 and 2007, before reprising the role for the latest time in 2014. However, Cowper is possibly best known for playing the abrasive D.S. Helen Diamond in four series of the BBC's police drama, Dangerfield, between 1996 and 1999.

== Personal life ==
Cowper is the younger sister of twin actresses Jackie Cowper and Gerry Cowper, the latter being most famous for playing Rosie Miller in BBC's EastEnders — though the Cowper sisters did not appear in the serial at the same time.

Cowper was in a long-term relationship with Tony McCann, a convicted armed robber who served a 15-year jail sentence for holding up a Lloyds Bank and stealing £9,000 in 1988. Cowper's elder sister, Gerry, fell in love with and married McCann's accomplice in the robbery, Mark Foley, though they have since separated. Cowper and McCann have twin daughters (but not identical), Dora and Tilly, born in 1999, and they live in Twickenham, south-west London. In April 2008 McCann was found guilty of murdering a 33-year-old man and sentenced to a minimum of 21 years imprisonment. Tony McCann died in prison of liver and kidney cancer on 19 October 2020.
