= Rosie Miller =

- EastEnders character
- Portrayed by: Gerry Cowper
- Duration: 2004–2006
- First appearance: Episode 2794; 6 September 2004
- Last appearance: Episode 3183; 7 July 2006
- Introduced by: Louise Berridge
In-universe information
- Occupation: Cleaner
- Brothers: Clint
- Husband: Mike Swann (backstory)
- Sons: Mickey Miller; Darren Miller
- Daughters: Dawn Swann; Demi Miller
- Grandsons: George Trott
- Granddaughters: Aleesha Miller; Summer Swann

Rosie Miller is a fictional character from the BBC soap opera EastEnders, played by Gerry Cowper. Her first appearance was on 6 September 2004 and she was axed in 2006, with her final scenes airing in July 2006.

Rosie is the mother of Mickey Miller (Joe Swash), Dawn Swann (Kara Tointon), Demi (Shana Swash) and Darren Miller (Charlie G. Hawkins). Described as "hardworking", she is heavily protective over her family and makes enemies such as Pauline Fowler (Wendy Richard) and Stacey Slater (Lacey Turner).

== Casting and development ==
In July 2004, The Sun reported that a controversial family of lowlifes would be joining EastEnders in an attempt to boost ratings. It was said that they would make the Slater family "look like royalty". Their casting was confirmed a month later when executive producer, Louise Berridge, commented: "I'm delighted to introduce the Miller family, who will be joining Mickey on Albert Square in September, but I warn you – this lot are trouble". She added: "Even the dog is dodgy. They're set to cause havoc all over the Square, and by the end of their first week the sparks will be flying – literally". The family initially consisted of father, Keith (David Spinx), mother, Rosie, eldest son, Mickey (Joe Swash), twins, Demi (Shana Swash) and Darren (Charlie G. Hawkins) and their mangy Irish Wolfhound dog, Ghengis.

The BBC also described Rosie as "the backbone of the Millers" and "lives for Keith and the kids". It was also said that Rosie "uses sheer hard work and determination to make ends meet". Cowper said on the role of Rosie, "I'm delighted to be joining such a prestigious show. It couldn't have come at a better time for me in terms of my life and career. I know it's going to be hard work but I'm looking forward to the challenge. Rosie is a fantastic character and one that I can really get my teeth into." Cowper also had a small role in EastEnders, before the family's arrival. In April 2002, she played Lindsay, the mother of a schizophrenic called Matt.

In February 2006, it was announced that Cowper and Shana Swash had been axed from the soap and that Rosie and Demi would be leaving, later that year. It was also made clear that the rest of the Miller family, including Keith, would be staying on. A spokesperson for the show said in a statement, "Gerry and Shana have been enormous assets and go with our best wishes," adding that a "massive" storyline had been planned for their exit.

== Storylines ==
=== Backstory ===
Rosie's mother committed suicide when she was young, leaving her with her brother, Clint, and other siblings. Rosie was married to Mike Swann (Mark Wingett), and they had two children, Mickey and Dawn (Joe Swash and Kara Tointon). While they were still very young, Mike left Rosie and wasn't seen for many years.

Rosie later met Keith Miller (David Spinx), who took on her children as his own before having twins, Darren and Demi (Charlie G. Hawkins and Shana Swash). He cannot read and is work-shy. He tends to sit around watching television all day, making excuses to Rosie as to why he does not go and find employment.

=== 2004–2006 ===
From her first appearance in 2004, Rosie is seen working hard to support her family. She has a number of cleaning jobs, and takes care of her granddaughter, Aleesha (Freya and Phoebe Coltman-West), while Demi and Darren go to school.

In December 2005, Rosie's ex-husband, Mike, is homeless and stays with the Millers'. Rosie and Mike have an affair, and she plans to leave Keith for Mike, taking Darren, Demi and Aleesha with them. Mickey and Dawn find out about this, and Mickey tries to convince her not to leave. Eventually, she decides she cannot take the twins away from their father, and chooses to stay with Keith. Rosie tells Keith about her affair, but does not mention she had planned to leave. Keith forgives her until Dawn lets slip that Rosie had planned to leave. Keith then leaves Rosie.

Keith soon moves back in when he proposes to Rosie, but he does not really want to get married and so he keeps putting off the wedding. Rosie, however, does not want to wait and the ceremony takes place on 4 July 2006 at Walford Register Office. Keith arrives late and with mud on his suit. Annoyed, Rosie jilts Keith during the ceremony and tells him the next day that she no longer loves him and plans to take a job in the Cotswolds. She also wants to take Darren, Demi and Aleesha. They plan to leave the Square the next day but Darren does not want to go. Rosie convinces Keith to make sure Darren goes with them so Keith tells Darren he does not care about him. Upset, Darren prepares to leave with his mother, sister and niece. However, Rosie can see how upset he is, and decides to tell him that Keith made it all up, allowing Darren to stay in Walford after all. Rosie leaves Walford with Demi and Aleesha. On 9 December 2024, Mickey makes a brief return to Albert Square and reveals to Big Mo that Rosie is working at his new family business, ‘Miller’s Villas’ alongside his sister Dawn.

== Reception ==
After Rosie arrived on the soap, Nancy Banks-Smith, from The Guardian, said that she was Keith's "paranoid wife". Digital Spy's Dek Hogan praised Spinx and Cowper's acting, in August 2005, after their part in a storyline that sees Demi go missing. Hogan hoped that their part in the story would be remembered when the nominees for award ceremonies are being picked. Upon Rosie's exit, a spokesperson from the soap, described Rosie as an "enormous asset".

In 2022, Kyle O'Sullivan, from The Mirror, deemed the Miller family as "chaotic" and said the members were "troublemakers" and also mentioned that they were instantly fighting with existing families, such as the Fowlers and Slaters. O'Sullivan also said that fans had a lot of anger towards the family's axings. He also described Keith as "lazy". In April 2023, Angie Quinn from MyLondon, when talking about the Miller family, called Rosie a "hard-working mum". She then said that her family was branded "unruly" and mentioned that they only received a "warm welcome" from their neighbours on Albert Square. She also stated that viewers instantly "fell in love" with what she called a "rowdy clan" and said that they're "still adored to this day".
