= Miller Field =

Miller Field may refer to:

== Places ==
=== In the United States ===
- Jessee/Miller Field, Trinity College, Hartford, Connecticut
- Zell B. Miller Field, Young Harris, Georgia
- Les Miller Field, a baseball venue in Chicago, Illinois
- Miller Field (baseball), a baseball stadium in Owensboro, Kentucky
- Joe Miller Field at Cowgirl Diamond, Lake Charles, Louisiana
- Miller Field (airport), an airport in Valentine, Nebraska (IATA: VTN, ICAO: KVTN)
- Miller Field (Las Cruces), New Mexico; an American football stadium
- Miller Field (Staten Island, New York), a park and former military base in New Dorp, Staten Island, New York
- Miller Field, a ball park on the campus of Brigham Young University in Provo, Utah; see Larry H. Miller Field
  - Larry H. Miller Field, a baseball stadium on the campus of Brigham Young University in Provo, Utah
  - Gail Miller Field, a softball stadium on the campus of Brigham Young University in Provo, Utah
- Marty L. Miller Field, a baseball venue in Norfolk, Virginia

=== Other places ===
- Melfort (Miller Field) Aerodrome (TC LID: CJZ3), Melfort, Saskatchewan, Canada; an airport
- Miller oilfield, a North Sea oil and gas field

== See also ==
- Bowden Golf Course, built on the site of Miller Field, a former airfield in Macon, Georgia
- Miller Park (disambiguation)
- Miller (disambiguation)
- Field (disambiguation)
