= Huggy Leaver =

British actor

Huggy Leaver (born Hugh Leaver), sometimes credited as Huggy Lever, is a British actor and former vocalist of The Plastix, an early UK Punk band. He subsequently became lead singer of the Hastings Mod Revival Band Teenbeats from 1979-1982.

He has appeared in Trial & Retribution, Birds of a Feather, A Touch of Frost and Black Books. He also played Paul in Lock, Stock and Two Smoking Barrels and Mario in the 2000 film Going Off Big Time and appeared as a cab driver in The League of Extraordinary Gentlemen and the pawn shop owner in Fast & Furious 6.

More recently, he played the recurrent role of Clint in EastEnders and Delivery Man 2 in Never Let Me Go.

He has a love of motorcycles and has customized some in the streetfighter style, as created by designer/artist Andy Sparrow, in his strip Bloodrunners in the 1980s. One such streetfighter was featured in the 1995 movie Mad dogs and Englishmen and ridden by C. Thomas Howell's despatch rider character.

== Filmography ==
Year	Title	Role	Notes
1993	The Young Americans	Mark Byrne	
1995	Judge Dredd	Brutal Prisoner	
1995	Brothers in Trouble	Market Porter	
1995	Boston Kickout	Bouncer	
1998	Lock, Stock and Two Smoking Barrels	Paul	
2000	Going Off Big Time	Mario	
2003	The League of Extraordinary Gentlemen	Hanson Cab Driver	
2008	Freebird	Sulph	
2008	Somers Town	Café Owner	
2009	Somnolence		
2010	Never Let Me Go	Delivery Man 1	
2011	Gun of the Black Sun	Ciggy	
2012	Gangsters, Guns & Zombies	Tony	
2013	Fast & Furious 6	Pawn shop owner	
2013	The Lost Mantle of Elijah	Gruesome	
2015	Blood and Carpet	Bernard	
2015	Legend	Pig & Whistle Barman	
