= John Stanley (playwright) =

British playwright and screenwriter (born 1966)

John Stanley (born 1966) is a British playwright and screenwriter. He is best known as the writer of Proud, a play written to commemorate the 10th anniversary of the Admiral Duncan bombing in Soho, London, and as the screenwriter of the British thriller/horror feature film The Last Seven.

== Background and career ==
Stanley was born in Edmonton, North London in 1966. In 2000 Stanley became a script writer and storyline consultant on the channel 5 continuing drama Family Affairs. He remained a regular writer for the show until 2005.

In 2009, he wrote the stage play Proud, a gay-themed play marking the 10th anniversary of the bombing of the Admiral Duncan bar in Soho, London. Proud was updated by Stanley and revived by The LOST Theatre, London in 2012 to coincide with the 2012 Olympic Games.

His first feature film, The Last Seven, premiered in 2010 at the Odeon Cinema, Shaftesbury Avenue in London. It was subsequently released on DVD in the UK and around the world.

In 2011, he wrote the short film Sound, which had its world premiere at the Bodega Bay Short Film Festival in the United States.

In June 2012, Stanley's one act play, Gabrielle's Kitchen was produced as part of LOST Theatre Company's One Act Festival. Adjudicator Jeremy Kingston said, "A powerful one-woman piece by John Stanley in which Holly Elmes plays three generations of women all called Gabrielle." The play won the award for 'Best Cast' with Holly Elmes and Jeremy Kingston went on to say "Elmes gives a most impressive, sharply distinguished range of performances, and Fana Cioban's gripping direction is admirably in tune with the writing."
