= Miller Park (disambiguation) =

Miller Park, now known as American Family Field, is a baseball stadium in Milwaukee, Wisconsin, United States.

Miller Park may also refer to:

== Places ==
=== United States ===
Listed alphabetically by state

- Joaquin Miller Park in Oakland, California
- Millers Pond State Park in Middlesex County, Connecticut
- Miller Park (Bloomington, Illinois), a public park
  - Miller Park Zoo in Bloomington, Illinois
- Miller Park South, a nickname for Wrigley Field in Chicago, Illinois
- Rocky Miller Park, a baseball park in Evanston, Illinois
- East Main Street–Glen Miller Park Historic District, Richmond, Wayne County, Indiana
- Hart-Miller Island State Park, Chesapeake Bay, Maryland
- Miller Park (Omaha, Nebraska), a neighborhood
  - Miller Park Elementary School in North Omaha
  - Miller Park (North Omaha), a park in North Omaha
- Miller State Park in Hillsborough County, New Hampshire
- Robert J. Miller Air Park, a public-use airport in Ocean County, New Jersey
- Bledsoe–Miller Park, a park in Waco, Texas
- Miller Motorsport Park, former name of Utah Motorsports Campus in Grantsville, Utah

=== Other places ===
- Miller Park, Brisbane, a heritage-listed park in Queensland, Australia
- Miller Park, Preston, a park in Lancashire, England

== Other uses ==
- Ulmus americana 'Miller Park', a cultivar of the American elm tree

== See also ==
- Miller Park Way, a former highway designation in Milwaukee near the ballpark
- Park-Miller RNG, a type of random number generator
- Miller Field (disambiguation)
