= Dan Milne =

British actor/director

Dan Milne is a British actor/director who is possibly best known for his role in EastEnders.

== Career ==
He started his career in 1996 and made an appearance in Murder Most Horrid and as a pub poet in In a Land of Plenty. He then appeared in EastEnders as David Collins, Jane Beale's dying husband. As a member of the Young Vic, he collaborated with Tim Supple to originate Grimm Tales, which toured internationally, culminating in a Broadway run at the New Victory Theater. Since that time he has collaborated on more than seven major new works, including Two Men Talking, which has run for the past six years in various cities across the world. In 2013, he replaced Ken Barrie as the voice of the Reverend Timms in the children's show, Postman Pat.
