= Proud (play) =

2009 comedy drama play by John Stanley

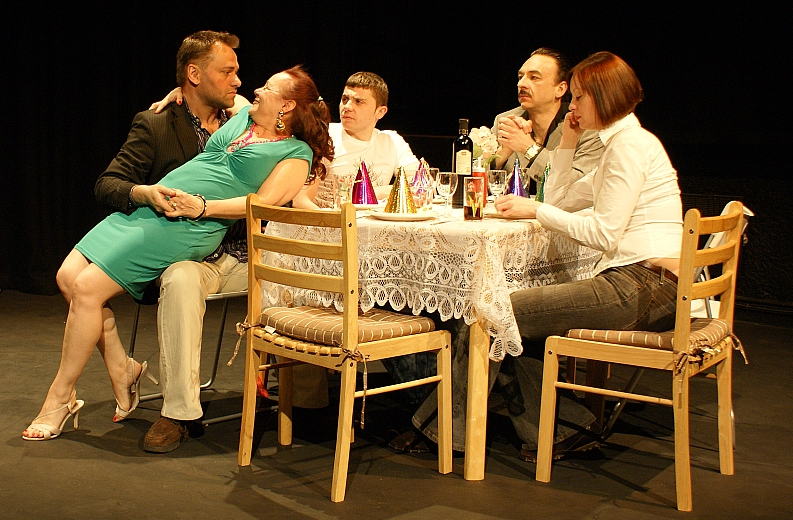
A scene from the play.

Proud is a comedy drama by John Stanley that explores issues surrounding gay pride and identity. It depicts a love story between Tom, a survivor of the Admiral Duncan bombing in 1999, and his 18-year-old boyfriend Lewis, a 2012 Olympic boxing hopeful, exploring their different attitudes toward being "Out and Proud". The play premiered at New Wimbledon Studio on April 8, 2009.

== Plot synopsis ==
Rachel McCain, the proud mother of 18-year-old boxer Lewis, organizes a birthday dinner in his honor, inviting a small but select group to celebrate the occasion. Amongst the guests are Lewis's much older boyfriend Tom, a survivor of the 1999 Admiral Duncan bombing and Mac, Lewis's homophobic boxing trainer. Unbeknownst to Rachel, Lewis has been hiding his sexual identity from Mac and consequently an evening of comical subterfuge and meaningful soul searching unfolds.

== Production history ==
Proud was originally performed as part of the New Wimbledon Theatre Fresh Ideas Season from April 8–11, 2009. The cast consisted of Jay Brown (Lewis McCain), Nic Gilder (Tom Sanders), Anna Lindup (Rachel McCain), Timothy Dodd (Mac), Emma Swinn (Ally Ferris) and Shana Swash (Colleen McCain). The Production was directed by Christian Durham, Assistant Director was Katherine Hare. The Production Designer was Prav Menon-Johansson. Proud transferred to Above The Stag Theatre, Bressenden Place, Victoria where it performed from April 14 - May 10, 2009 with the same cast.

Proud was updated by Stanley and revived by The LOST Theatre, London in 2012 to coincide with the 2012 Olympic Games. The 2012 production was produced by LOST Theatre and directed by Oliver Jack. The cast consisted of Parry Glasspool (Lewis McCain), Matthew Hebden (Tom Sanders), Virginia Byron (Rachel McCain), Charlie Carter (Mac), Claire Huskisson (Ally Ferris) and Ellen Sussams (Colleen McCain).

== Critical reception ==
Critical reception for the 2009 production was generally good. Paul Vale of The Stage wrote, "John Stanley’s new play represents a sterling attempt to marry farcical comedy with weightier themes." QX Magazine criticized the play as "falling short of brilliant" due to its dual nature of being a drama and a comedy, however eventually concluding that, "...it makes a very welcome change for a gay play to aim to inspire rather than depress! Judging by the moist eyes at the curtain call it certainly succeeds at just that." RemoteGoat described it as a "clever farce", and gave it 4 stars.

The 2012 revival garnered largely positive reviews. So So Gay, published an online review of the LOST revival production which said “Proud could be described as the meeting ground for Jonathan Harvey’s Beautiful People – a much loved show that is now considered a classic – and La Cage Aux Folles by Harvey Fierstein and Jerry Herman. Filled with likable characters and an ongoing attempt at deception and hidden identities, Proud written by John Stanley, may quickly develop its own little resting place along with those memorable and historically-important shows.” While QX magazine said “Stanley essentially subverts the classic farce genre playing with the scenario of ‘dinner party gone wild’. Stanley’s writing also keeps the action zipping along with some fantastic, snappy dialogue and some great comic one-liners. The play also covers themes wider than ‘just gay issues’ as we are party to scenes covering the themes of parenting, family conflict and the journey into adulthood, all presented to us in an entertaining, engaging and accessible style.”

Writer John Stanley has discussed the creation of Proud on a number of websites including Whatsonstage.com. and GaydarNation.
