= New Blood (TV series) =

- Genre: Crime drama
- Created by: Anthony Horowitz
- Written by: Anthony Horowitz
- Directed by: Anthony Philipson
- Starring: Mark Strepan; Ben Tavassoli; Mark Addy; Anna Chancellor; Ariyon Bakare; Aiysha Hart; Dorian Lough; Kimberley Nixon; Mark Bonnar
- Opening theme: "Wolves" by Rag'n'Bone Man
- Composer: Neil Davidge
- Country of origin: United Kingdom
- Original language: English
- No. of series: 1
- No. of episodes: 7

Production
- Executive producer: Jill Green
- Producer: Eve Gutierrez
- Production company: Eleventh Hour Films

Original release
- Network: BBC One
- Release: 9 June – 21 July 2016

New Blood is a British television drama series created by Anthony Horowitz and produced by Eleventh Hour Films for BBC One. The first three episodes of the programme were made available on BBC iPlayer on 2 June 2016, ahead of the BBC One premiere on 9 June. It received over 4 million viewers.

== Synopsis ==
Stefan Kowolski and Arrash Sayyad are junior investigators; both are the children of immigrants. Initially thrown together by chance and common sporting interests, they later discover that they are working two different angles of the same case. Stefan is also attracted to Arrash's sister.

Kowolski is a junior investigator with the Serious Fraud Office, while Sayyad is a uniformed constable in London's police service, with ambitions of becoming a detective. In the first case, he secures a second posting as a Trainee Detective Constable (T/DC), having obtained poor reviews in an earlier attempt.

== Cast ==
The main cast for the first series include:

- Mark Strepan as Stefan Kowolski, Junior Case Officer, SFO
- Ben Tavassoli as TDC Arrash 'Rash' Sayyad
- Mark Addy as DS Derek Sands
- Dorian Lough as DI Martin Heywood
- Anna Chancellor as Eleanor Davies, Director of the SFO
- Ariyon Bakare as Marcus Johnson, Senior Case Officer, SFO
- Kimberley Nixon as Alison White, Junior Case Officer, SFO
- Aiysha Hart as Leila Sayyad, Junior Nurse, Arrash's sister
- Mark Bonnar as Peter Mayhew, Government Health Advisor

== Episodes ==
| No. | Title | Directed by | Written by | Original release date | UK viewers (millions) |
|---|---|---|---|---|---|
| 1 | "Case 1, Part 1" | Anthony Philipson | Anthony Horowitz | 2 June 2016 (BBC iPlayer); 9 June 2016 (BBC One) | 5.14 |
Arrash "Rash" Sayyad is given a temporary promotion to CID, despite earlier failures. He is paired with DS Derek Sands, who considers Sayyad a "smart alec". While investigating the murder of a young man involved with a clinical drugs trial in India, Rash comes into contact with Stefan Kowolski, a Serious Fraud Employee who has been given his first major undercover task, investigating David Leese, the owner of a pharmaceutical company suspected of corruption. Meanwhile, Rash discovers that another member of the group involved in the trial was found dead following a hit and run three weeks previously. Realising their witness could be in grave danger, he sets off in pursuit, but arrives moments after she has been pushed to her death down an escalator at Canary Wharf railway station.
| 2 | "Case 1, Part 2" | Anthony Philipson | Anthony Horowitz | 2 June 2016 (BBC iPlayer); 16 June 2016 (BBC One) | N/A |
Sands suspects Henry Williams, another member of the group involved with the trial group, who suffers from schizophrenic episodes, may have been responsible for the three murders. Williams is questioned, but he claims that he was only at the scene of the most recent murder after being invited to meet up with a girl that he had met online, called Caroline. Stefan's pursuit of David Leese results in his being drugged at a private party and thrown into the path of a moving lorry. A search of Henry Williams' house uncovers evidence that Rash believes may have been planted. Stefan realises that the only way to get to Leese is via his connection with the company Green Fern, and arrives on the doorstep of Henry Williams just as Rash is about to arrest him; the pair realise their cases may be connected.
| 3 | "Case 1, Part 3" | Anthony Philipson | Anthony Horowitz | 2 June 2016 (BBC iPlayer); 23 June 2016 (BBC One) | N/A |
Rash and Stefan decide to go it alone to prove Henry Williams' innocence, but their pursuit of David Leese leads to them both being suspended from their jobs. However, Bruce Lockwood — another of the trial group — agrees to a meet them in a private London hotel, unaware he is being trailed by hired killers. Rash realises that a bomb has been planted in Lockwood's room, but before they can make their escape, Lockwood is shot and killed. Rash and Stefan manage to escape, and present their findings, resulting in them both earning their jobs back. Coleman Blake tries to dispose of the evidence relating to his involvement, but his own heavies turn on him and he is left for dead. Meanwhile, Rash and Stefan, who are both unhappy with their current accommodation, decide to become flatmates.
| 4 | "Case 2, Part 1" | Anthony Philipson | Anthony Horowitz | 23 June 2016 (BBC iPlayer); 30 June 2016 (BBC One) | N/A |
When a young man is killed in a generator explosion on a building site, Rash and Sands investigate the possibility that he may have been murdered. Meanwhile, following a tip-off from her uncle Peter, Alison persuades Eleanor to investigate the brains behind the Scimitar, a new high-rise skyscraper set to be built in the centre of London. When Rash discovers the dead man may have discovered a priceless artefact whilst working on the site, he visits a local antiques dealer, but is warned against pursuing the line of enquiry. When he is pursued by two men after leaving the dealer's warehouse, he assaults one of them, unaware they are undercover Counter-terrorism officers. Having unwittingly walked right into the middle of a six-month surveillance operation on the dealer, Rash is ordered to take the place of the officer who is now out of action.
| 5 | "Case 2, Part 2" | Anthony Philipson | Anthony Horowitz | 23 June 2016 (BBC iPlayer); 6 July 2016 (BBC One) | N/A |
Following John Gulliver's murder, Rash is once again hauled over the coals, but manages to get himself out of Heywood's bad books by giving Counter-terrorism a lead on the location of a number of stolen sculptures that Gulliver was hiding. He and Stefan decide to go in search of the missing artefact that was the cause of Gulliver's death, but they are not the only ones on the trail. The Wesley brothers are getting impatient, and order hitman Mark to kidnap Rash and Stefan and interrogate them until they reveal the missing artefact's location. Meanwhile, Eleanor is unimpressed when she discovers that Alison's tip-offs are coming from Peter Mayhew, and confronts him to find out what his agenda really is. With Rash and Stefan now at the mercy of Mark Craig, they must find a way to escape before he discovers that they have no leads on the missing artefact.
| 6 | "Case 3, Part 1" | Bill Eagles | Anthony Horowitz & Daniel Fajemisin & Marlon Smith | 7 July 2016 (BBC iPlayer); 14 July 2016 (BBC One) | N/A |
Rash and Sands investigate a series of burglaries on upmarket London flats. Meanwhile, the SFO are on the trail of John Malik, whom they suspect is hiding serial fraudster Daniel Lorca, wanted for conning thousands of unsuspecting pensioners out of their hard-earned savings. Rash is unwittingly drafted onto the case when Stefan decides to illegally search Lorca's uninhabited London flat. Their investigation leads them to a Turkish bath, but Stefan's eagerness to find the elusive Lorca leads to the pair ending up on the wrong side of a beating. Meanwhile, another burglary is committed, but this time the homeowner, Michael Freeland, is stabbed by two masked men. When he is brought into hospital, he is forced to undergo emergency surgery — but later dies after an overdose of IV medication. Leila, Rash's sister, is blamed for his death.
| 7 | "Case 3, Part 2" | Bill Eagles | Anthony Horowitz & Daniel Fajemisin & Marlon Smith | 7 July 2016 (BBC iPlayer); 21 July 2016 (BBC One) | N/A |
Rash is determined to clear his sister's name, and with the help of Stefan, sets about tracking down Lisa Douglas. Meanwhile, John Malik offers Stefan a deal — the Our Child accounts with evidence of fake payments in return for the 'Bermuda' DVD taken during the search of his house. Stefan soon realises, however, there is more to the DVD than meets the eye — and discovers a passport which confirms Malik is Daniel Lorca. Meanwhile, he and Rash witness a meeting between Lisa Douglas and David Kumalah, an African diplomat who has recently spoken out against the level of aid being covered up by his own government. They try to access Kumalah's laptop, but he catches him the act and sends two heavies to silence them. They manage to escape, but it's not long before Kumalah is on their tail, determined to silence them once and for all.
