= Bachelor Father (British TV series) =

British TV sitcom (1970–1971)

- Genre: Sitcom
- Starring: Ian Carmichael; Gerald Flood; Colin Gordon; Pauline Yates; Jack May; Rona Anderson; Sonia Graham; Diana King
- Country of origin: United Kingdom
- No. of series: 2
- No. of episodes: 22 + 2 shorts

Production
- Running time: 30 minutes

Original release
- Network: BBC1
- Release: 17 September 1970 – 25 December 1971

Bachelor Father is a British sitcom starring Ian Carmichael that aired for two series from 1970 to 1971. It was written by Richard Waring.

== Background ==
Bachelor Father is loosely based on the life of Peter Lloyd Jeffcock. Jeffcock was a bachelor who had fostered twelve children. He later wrote an autobiography called Only Uncle. Richard Waring, who wrote Bachelor Father, based some of the plots on incidents told in Only Uncle. Waring said that he would have kept more of Only Uncle, but many of the true stories were so far-fetched, he thought the public wouldn't believe them.

== Cast ==
- Ian Carmichael – Peter Lamb
- Sonia Graham – Mrs Rathbone
- Diana King – Norah
- Ian Johnson – Ben
- Briony McRoberts – Anna
- Michael Douglas – Freddie
- Beverley Simons – Jane
- Joan Hickson – Mrs Pugsley
- Gerald Flood – Harry (series 1)
- Colin Gordon – Mr Gibson (series 1)
- Pauline Yates – Mrs Moore (series 1 and 1970 special)
- Jack May – Mr Moore (series 1)
- Rona Anderson – Mary (series 1)
- Roland Pickering – Donald (series 1 and 1970 special)
- Andrew Bowen – Donald (series 2)
- Kevin Moran – Christopher (series 2)
- Gerry Cowper – Jo (series 2)
- Jacqueline Cowper – Ginny (series 2)

== Plot ==
Peter Lamb is a rich man who has always wanted a family, but failed to sustain any relationships. In the first episode, he decides to foster children. He then fosters a variety of diverse children

== Survival status ==
22 episodes in total were produced; because of the BBC's wiping policy in the 1970s, only one episode still exists in its original colour form, the first one: "Family Feeling". The other existing episodes below, indicated with an asterisk, survive as 16mm black and white telerecordings. Any other episodes are considered lost forever.

=== Series One (1970) ===
1. Family Feeling (17 September 70)*
2. All in the Family (24 September 70)*
3. First of the Many (1 October 70)
4. The Normal Front (8 October 70)
5. Birthday Boys (15 October 70)*
6. The Peter Pan Syndrome (22 October 70)
7. A Little Learning (29 October 70)
8. A Spot of Natural Expression (5 November 70)
9. A Man's Man About The House (12 November 70)
10. A Kind of Love-In (19 November 70)
11. Time To Go Home (26 November 70)
12. Love They Neighbour (3 December 70)
13. Feminine Company (10 December 70)

=== Special (1970) ===
- Short special as part of Christmas Night with the Stars (25 December 70)

=== Series Two (1971) ===
1. Pet Ideas (16 September 71)*
2. House Guest (23 September 71)*
3. Partners in Crime (30 September 71)*
4. Economy Class (7 October 71)*
5. Not in Front of the Children (14 October 71)*
6. Name This Child (21 October 71)*
7. Gently Does It (28 October 71)*
8. Woman About The House (4 November 71)*
9. Peter Lamb – This Is Your Anniversary (11 November 71)*

=== Special (1971) ===
- Short special as part of Christmas Night with the Stars (25 December 71)
