= Darren Miller =

Fictional character from EastEnders

- EastEnders character
- Portrayed by: Charlie G. Hawkins
- Duration: 2004–2011
- First appearance: Episode 2794; 6 September 2004
- Last appearance: Episode 4286; 20 September 2011
- Introduced by: Louise Berridge
- Crossover appearances: East Street (2010)
In-universe information
- Occupation: Car salesman Ice cream seller
- Father: Keith Miller
- Mother: Rosie Miller
- Sisters: Demi Miller
- Half-brothers: Mickey Miller
- Half-sisters: Dawn Swann
- Sons: George Trott
- Uncles: Clint
- Nieces: Aleesha Miller; Summer Swann

Darren Miller is a fictional character from the BBC soap opera EastEnders, played by Charlie G. Hawkins. He made his first appearance on 6 September 2004 and departed in the episode broadcast on 20 September 2011.

== Creation and development ==
=== Casting ===
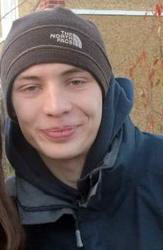
Charlie G. Hawkins, pictured here in 2011, was cast as Darren.

The casting team held workshops, screen tests and script readings with the potential actors. Shana Swash, the sister of Joe Swash, was cast as Mickey's younger half sister Demi Miller. Other family members included stepfather Keith (David Spinx), mother Rosie (Gerry Cowper) and Demi's twin brother Darren, played by Charlie G. Hawkins. The casting director Katrine Collins had worked with Hawkins before and decided to cast him as Darren Miller.

The family were publicised as "troublemakers" who were joining "in order to drum up conflict with existing characters." Louise Berridge said, "This lot are trouble. Even the dog is dodgy [...] They're set to cause havoc all over the square..." The family's introduction in September 2004 followed a survey in the Daily Mirror newspaper, which suggested that 57% of EastEnders viewers thought the soap had lost its appeal.

Hawkins discussed his character in 2004: "Darren's a bit of a rough kid. He's a great character to play. There are resemblances of myself in there, although that's a matter of opinion. It's good to play someone like that, where you can have a laugh".

=== Storyline development ===
In 2009, a "whodunnit"-style storyline saw the character of Heather Trott (Cheryl Fergison) become pregnant by an unknown man. Several characters were given as possible fathers, including Darren. Before the father was revealed on screen, Hawkins gave an interview in which he talked about what would happen if Darren was the father: "It would change everything. Darren would worry that [his girlfriend] Libby wouldn't marry him – and what about Libby's parents Denise and Owen? I think he'd be alright as a dad, but he wouldn't want the burden. It'd rock the boat if it was Darren." Darren was revealed to be the father of baby George Trott in the episode broadcast on 23 October 2009. Fergison told entertainment website Digital Spy, "Darren will be a good dad but he'll be very businesslike about it. He'll say that he doesn't really want to have anything to do with George but will pay his way for him. You'll see him change, though, and you'll start to see him getting attached. [Heather's friend] Shirley doesn't want Darren to go anywhere near George, though! It'll be interesting to see how they write it from here for Darren, especially with the Libby angle."

In December 2009, executive producer Diederick Santer was asked what his favourite storyline of the year had been. He replied "I loved the way the 'Who's The Daddy?' story with Heather played, too. As time goes on, I expect we'll discover more about what happened that night. It makes sense to me – he's a horny, drunk 18-year-old! Everyone thinks that they did it in the [toilet] cubicle, but it's surely clear that they went home?"

=== Departure ===
It was announced on 30 April 2011 that Hawkins had decided to leave the series. He said "I've enjoyed my time at EastEnders immensely, it's been a terrific chapter in my life and I've loved every minute of it. I've had tremendous support throughout my duration on the show and I would like to thank Bryan and the whole team for believing in me." Hawkins told the Sunday Mirror that he could "barely remember life before EastEnders" and said he was leaving so he could "chill out and enjoy being a normal 20-year-old". Darren departed in the episode broadcast on 20 September 2011.

== Storylines ==
The Miller family move to Walford in 2004. Darren is presented as a mischievous child who causes trouble for the residents of Walford including the theft of a donkey as a gift for his twin sister, Demi Miller (Shana Swash), taken from Derek Harkinson (Ian Lavender). In November 2005, Darren finds thousands of pounds belonging to Jake Moon (Joel Beckett), which Alfie Moon (Shane Richie) has accidentally thrown out in the rubbish. Darren uses the money to buy a mobile phone, and spends it mostly on his girlfriend, Kylie, who eventually splits up with Darren because he is unable to buy alcohol. Darren shares the money with Demi, but it is found by their older half-sister Dawn's (Kara Tointon) father, Mike Swann (Mark Wingett). Mike steals the money, leaving the Millers with nothing.

Darren finds employment at Kevin Wicks' (Phil Daniels) car lot, and decides to stay in Walford when his parents split up in 2006, and his mother and sister move to the Cotswolds. He becomes friendly with Libby Fox (Belinda Owusu) and they perform numerous pranks on their families together; an attraction develops, and they begin a relationship. Darren gets involved in a car scam when Kevin starts selling stolen cars that turn out to be dangerous cut and shuts. When Kevin dies due to an accident in one of the cars, Darren takes over control of the car lot. Darren blames Phil Mitchell (Steve McFadden) for Kevin's death, as he forced Kevin to sell the cars. Darren subsequently gets involved in a feud between Phil and Jack Branning (Scott Maslen), helping Jack to trick Phil into a confession about the stolen cars. Darren and Libby's relationship continues into 2008. Libby's mother, Denise Wicks (Diane Parish), feels that Darren is a bad influence on her daughter, and when Libby opts not to apply to Oxford University so she can stay with Darren, Denise persuades him to end the relationship. Darren dumps Libby to satisfy her needs, leaving her heartbroken. She eventually discovers the truth; she reunites with Darren. Darren makes Libby promise that she will not ruin her future and persuades her to apply to university.

Keith and Mickey Miller leave Walford to join Rosie and Demi in the Cotswolds. Darren's last relatives in Walford, Dawn and her daughter Summer, also decide to leave with Garry Hobbs (Ricky Groves). Libby then goes to university, but returns when her father Owen Turner (Lee Ross) is released from prison. Darren asks for Owen's permission to propose to Libby, and she accepts his proposal. They celebrate in The Queen Victoria pub, where Denise overhears them and tells them they cannot be engaged.

However, 18-year-old Darren soon discovers that he is the father of 42-year-old Heather Trott's (Cheryl Fergison) baby, George, following a drunken one-night stand on Valentine's night. Darren tells Heather that he will support George with money but nothing more. However, Darren begins to adapt to the idea of being a father to George. Darren gives Heather money he needed for a holiday with Libby. Heather returns it, in a card which Libby opens. Libby later overhears Heather and her best friend Shirley Carter (Linda Henry) talking about Darren. Devastated, Libby tells Darren in front of everyone that she knows he is George's father. Libby then goes back to Oxford. When she returns to Walford, Darren is upset to learn that Libby is now dating her fellow student, the conniving Adam Best (David Proud).

Soon after, Darren meets Jodie Gold (Kylie Babbington), and the two start a relationship. Darren and his flatmate Minty Peterson (Cliff Parisi) plan to attend the 2010 FIFA World Cup final. Minty gives the tickets to Darren to look after, but they end up destroyed in the wash, when Darren leaves them in his pocket. An enraged Minty orders Darren to move out of the flat. When Abi Branning (Lorna Fitzgerald) hears that Darren is homeless, she convinces her father Max (Jake Wood) to let him stay with them. Abi starts to fancy Darren, and attempts to sabotage his dates with Jodie.

On the first night that Darren attempts to get intimate with Jodie, she screams at the sight of his naked body, and runs away. Darren confronts her, and she apologises, but says that because Darren is not Jewish, and therefore not circumcised, she would find sex strange with him. Initially reluctant, Darren makes a call to book a circumcision. He does not tell Jodie he is having the operation and tells her he is going on holiday while he recovers. After the procedure, Jodie's father Harry (Linal Haft) mistakes him for Max and knees him in the groin due to Max's affair with his wife Vanessa (Zöe Lucker). The next day, Jodie sees Darren and tells him she no longer wants to see him because he lied. Darren tries to win Jodie back by making her laugh and tries to explain that he had a circumcision but she will not listen to him because he did not tell her about Max and Vanessa. However, she finally reads a letter he wrote and they reunite. They go on to have sex for the first time.

Harry later returns to Walford with Vanessa to get to know Darren better. Darren worries when Max jokes that Abi must fancy him, but Max and his elder daughter Lauren (Jacqueline Jossa) reassure him that it isn't true. Abi, meanwhile, remains overly keen to show affection to Darren. She uses the opportunity of the death of her cousin Billie Jackson (Devon Anderson) to get physically close to Darren to seek emotional support. Although Darren is at first willing to offer this support, he soon becomes uncomfortable with Abi's close attention. When Harry asks daughter Jodie to move out, she moves in with Darren. Harry then humiliates Vanessa, and Darren confronts him. In the process, he learns that Harry is not Jodie's real father. Darren begs Harry not to tell Jodie as it would break her heart. He then worries about what to do as he does not want to lie to Jodie. Later, when a dejected Jodie says Harry has phoned her, Darren presumes he has told her the truth of her paternity – but he has not. As a result, Darren inadvertently reveals the truth to Jodie himself.

During a New Year's Eve party, a drunken Jodie persuades Darren to tell her he wants to marry her. Darren is unsure at first but goes to propose, at which point she stops him, insisting that she was not serious. Max decides to relaunch the car lot with Jack as his new business partner. Jealous, Darren tries to sabotage the relaunch by not sending out the flyers but Max finds out and sacks him. Darren blames his sacking on Jodie, so she dumps him. At the R&R nightclub, Darren kisses a girl, causing Jodie to storm out. The next day he tries to apologise, saying it meant nothing, but Jodie will not listen. Abi finally confesses her feelings to Darren and tries to kiss him, but he rejects her because of her age and because of Jodie. Jodie overhears him telling Abi how much he loves her, and then he tells Jodie directly that he would change nothing about her and proposes.

Darren works for his friend Tamwar Masood (Himesh Patel) as a waiter until Vanessa convinces Max to reemploy Darren, which she does for Jodie's sake. When Heather suffers carbon monoxide poisoning, Darren makes the decision to take custody of George for his health and safety. Whilst in Jodie's care, George has an accident at the salon and Heather attempts to regain custody. Darren rebuffs this and instead tells Heather that he is going to court to gain permanent custody of George. However, the accident makes Jodie realise that she is too young to be a stepmother and, rather than make Darren choose between her and George, she ends their relationship. After Darren realises that being a single parent is not easy he drops the custody case, allows Heather to see George and he and Jodie get back together.

When Darren returns from a solo trip to see his family, he starts stealing money from work in order to pay for his and Jodie's upcoming wedding. Jack discovers this and informs Jodie, who says the wedding is over unless Darren can give a satisfactory explanation. However, Darren then gets drunk with Jodie's friend and bridesmaid Lauren and they have sex at the car lot. Jodie arrives and sees Darren and Lauren together but does not say anything and they are unaware that she is the person who saw them. Jodie later admits to Darren it was her but reassures him that she has forgiven him and still wants to marry him.

On Darren and Jodie's wedding day, Vanessa finds out from Syed Masood (Marc Elliott) what happened between Darren and Lauren and goes to confront him. He tells him he is not good enough for Jodie, comparing him to her cheating exes Max and Harry. Darren leaves for the wedding but, on his way, he changes his mind and tells Jodie that he cannot marry her. After saying goodbye to his friends, Darren visits Jodie one last time, telling her that he still loves her but is not worthy enough to marry her. He then leaves Walford in the wedding car that Mickey had hired for them. As he drives away, a heartbroken Jodie runs after him and catches the ‘congratulations’ balloon that falls off the car.

In November 2011, Tamwar reveals that Darren is living with his childhood sweetheart Libby in Oxford. Realising she and Darren were meant to be together, Jodie leaves for Oxford to win him back. In March 2012, Social Services try to find Darren after Heather is killed and George is left without a guardian. They are able to trace Darren to India, but cannot find any more information, so George is sent to live with his godmother, Heather's best friend, Shirley Carter. Shirley's partner Phil is eventually able to contact Darren and tells him to come back to England. Social Services then collect George from Shirley and Phil and take him to Darren. In February 2023, it's revealed that Darren and Libby have gone on a family trip to the Cotswolds.

== Reception ==
For his role as Darren, Hawkins was nominated for "Best Young Actor" at the 2007 Inside Soap Awards. Darren's 2010 circumcision storyline was criticised by a member of NHS staff who said Darren would not qualify to have the operation provided free of charge by the NHS as he does not have a valid medical reason for having it done, and that his apparent circumstances in the show make it seem unlikely he could afford to have the operation privately. The staff member also said the storyline lacked research, as Darren would have to study Hebrew to be accepted into the Jewish faith, though the storyline made no mention of Darren attempting to convert.
