= Ulmus americana 'St. Croix' =

Elm cultivar

Ulmus americana 'St Croix'
- Species: Ulmus americana
- Cultivar: 'St. Croix'
- Origin: St. Paul, Minnesota, US

The American elm cultivar Ulmus americana 'St. Croix' is a recent (2008) selection cloned from a large tree growing on a farm near Afton, Minnesota, which has displayed a high resistance to Dutch elm disease (DED). A U S patent, PP 20097, was granted in 2009.

== Description ==
‘St. Croix’ has an open-grown, spreading, vase-shaped crown. The growth rate is fast and typical of the species in Minnesota. The bark is typically divided into grayish, flat-topped ridges, which are separated by roughly diamond-shaped fissures and which become indefinite in pattern in the canopy. Bark on young branches is smooth with inconspicuous lenticels. The twigs are slender, zigzag, brown, glabrous or slightly pubescent; lateral buds are about 6 mm long, ovoid, acute but not sharp-pointed, smooth or sparingly downy, chestnut-brown. Leaves are deciduous, simple, alternate, short-petioled, 2-ranked, dark green (closest to 006600 on HTML True Color Chart), 10–15 cm (4–6 inches) long, 2.5–5 cm (1–2 inches) wide and oblong-obovate to elliptical, the margin coarsely doubly serrate, the apex acuminate while the base is typically inequilateral; surfaces glabrous (smooth) or slightly scabrous (roughened) above, usually pubescent below; veins alternate, ascending, parallel and extending from central vein to apex of longest serrations. The perfect apetalous wind-pollinated flowers are vernal, appearing before the leaves unfold, born in long-pedicelled fascicles of 3 or 4. The fruit is a samara maturing in the spring as the leaves unfold; about 12 mm (½ inch) long, oval to oblong-obovate, deeply notched at apex, margin ciliate with smooth surfaces.

The parent tree at Afton had a d.b.h. of 1.9 m when measured in 2008.

== Pests and diseases ==
Resistance to Dutch elm disease has been confirmed by inoculation trials conducted at Minnesota State University. Tested alongside established cultivars 'Valley Forge', 'Miller Park', and wild specimens, all three cultivars became symptomatic but survived, whereas the wild trees died. However, the relative percentages of defoliation and dieback of the three cultivars have not been disclosed. The species as a whole is susceptible to elm yellows; it is also moderately preferred for feeding and reproduction by the adult elm leaf beetle Xanthogaleruca luteola, and highly preferred for feeding by the Japanese beetle Popillia japonica in the United States. U. americana is also the most susceptible of all the elms to verticillium wilt.

== Cultivation ==
The tree is propagated and marketed by Bailey Nurseries , of Newport, Minnesota.

== Etymology ==
The tree is named for the St. Croix river valley.

== Accessions ==
=== North America ===
- Morton Arboretum, Illinois, US. Acc. no. 125-2014
