= Miller Field (baseball) =

Baseball stadium in Owensboro, Kentucky

Coordinates: 37°45′29″N 87°06′13″W

Miller Field was a baseball stadium in Owensboro, Kentucky.

Miller Field's final tenant was the Owensboro Oilers of the Kentucky–Illinois–Tennessee League (also called the KITty League), playing there from 1937 to 1955. Miller Field was considered the finest ballpark in the KITty League.

Miller Field was situated at Triplett Avenue and East 18th Street in Owensboro. Home plate was oriented to the northeast. Its dimensions were 320 feet (left field), 365 feet (center field) and 320 feet (right field).

Miller Field was demolished on September 19, 1955, after the dissolution of the KITTY League. James C. Ellis, who bought the property, stated that the parcel of land was too valuable to be a baseball park.
