= Miller, Kentucky =

Miller, Kentucky may refer to:

- Miller, Fulton County, Kentucky, an unincorporated community
- Miller, Perry County, Kentucky, an unincorporated community
