= Ulmus americana 'Miller Park' =

Elm cultivar

- Species: Ulmus americana
- Cultivar: 'Miller Park'
- Origin: Minnesota, US

The American elm cultivar Ulmus americana 'Miller Park' is a selection made by the University of Minnesota. Originally identified as MNT-0365, it was cloned from an old elm surviving in Hennepin County, Minnesota. 'Miller Park' is currently being researched (2016), but no data has yet been published. The tree is named for the eponymous park in Eden Prairie, in the environs of Minneapolis.

== Description ==
No details are yet available.

== Pests and diseases ==
'Miller Park' was found to have a resistance to Dutch elm disease. No other specific information is available, but the species is generally moderately preferred for feeding and reproduction by the adult elm leaf beetle Xanthogaleruca luteola, and highly preferred for feeding by the Japanese beetle Popillia japonica in the United States. U. americana is the most susceptible of all the elms to verticillium wilt.

== Cultivation ==
The tree was used as a control alongside 'Valley Forge' in the assessment of another Ulmus americana clone, 'St Croix'.
