= Miller Township =

Miller Township may refer to:

== Arkansas ==
- Miller Township, Cleveland County, Arkansas, in Cleveland County, Arkansas
- Miller Township, Franklin County, Arkansas, in Franklin County, Arkansas

== Illinois ==
- Miller Township, LaSalle County, Illinois

== Indiana ==
- Miller Township, Dearborn County, Indiana

== Iowa ==
- Miller Township, Woodbury County, Iowa

== Missouri ==
- Miller Township, Dallas County, Missouri
- Miller Township, Douglas County, Missouri, in Douglas County, Missouri
- Miller Township, Gentry County, Missouri
- Miller Township, Maries County, Missouri
- Miller Township, Marion County, Missouri
- Miller Township, Phelps County, Missouri
- Miller Township, Scotland County, Missouri

== Nebraska ==
- Miller Township, Knox County, Nebraska

== Ohio ==
- Miller Township, Knox County, Ohio

== Pennsylvania ==
- Miller Township, Huntingdon County, Pennsylvania
- Miller Township, Perry County, Pennsylvania

== South Dakota ==
- Miller Township, Hand County, South Dakota
- Miller Township, Marshall County, South Dakota, in Marshall County, South Dakota
