= Dorian Lough =

English actor (born 1966)

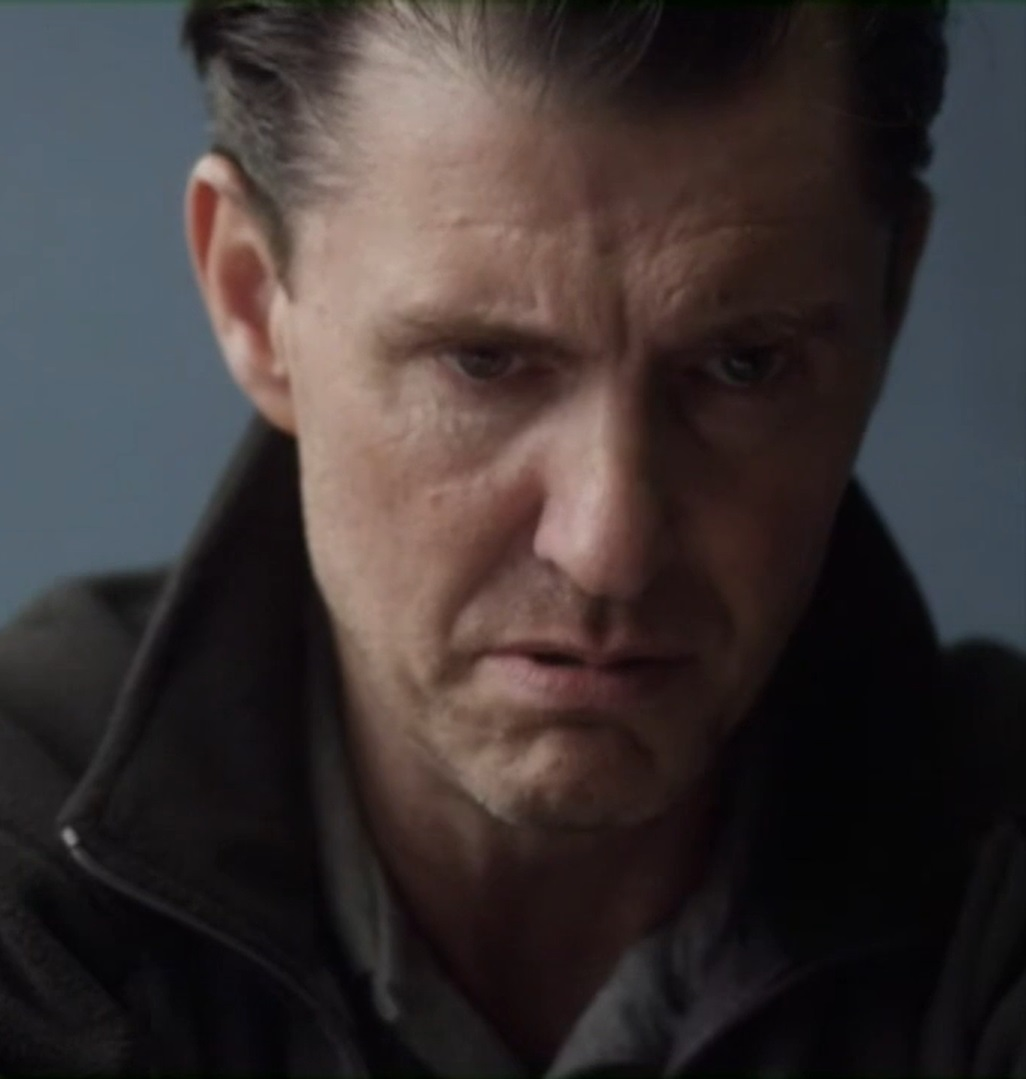
- Lough in Vera 2015
- Born: Dorian Tristan Lough; 4 April 1966 (age 60); Kensington, London, England
- Occupation: Actor
- Years active: 1994–present

Dorian Tristan Lough (born 4 April 1966 in Kensington, London) is an English actor who played DS Dave Satchell in Trial & Retribution (1997-2009). He has also played Ray Taylor in EastEnders (2004-2005). Other credits include Notting Hill (1999), Southcliffe (2013), The Tunnel (2016), and Vera (2015), New Blood (2016), My Cousin Rachel (2017), and The Last Kingdom (2020).

== Career ==
Lough portrayed an angry passerby in the music video for Radiohead's "Just" (1995). Lough also played DS Dave Satchell in Trial & Retribution from (1997-2009). He has also played Ray Taylor in EastEnders from (1996-2005). He made an appearance in the film Notting Hill (1999), Other credits include Southcliffe (2013), The Tunnel (2016), and Vera (2015).

In 2016, he starred Detective Inspector Martin Heywood in the Anthony Horowitz BBC crime drama New Blood. In 2017, he played Gabrielle, working alongside Rachel Weisz in My Cousin Rachel (2017).

== Partial filmography ==
- Haunting of the Queen Mary (2023)
- The Last Kingdom (2020-2022)
- My Cousin Rachel Gabriel (2017)
- New Blood DI Martin Heywood (2016)
- The Tunnel Captain Paul Spencer (2016)
- Vera Malcolm raggert (2015)
- Cradle to Grave Orrie (2015)
- Jonathan Strange & Mr Norrell Hyde (2015)
- The Smoke Billy "Mince" (2014)
- New Tricks Stuart McKelvie (2013)
- Southcliffe Commanding Officer (2013)
- Mrs Biggs Paul Seabourne (2012)
- Het Goddelijke Monster (Belgian tv-series) Mister Hoffman (2011)
- Skins Leon Levan (2011)
- Ashes to Ashes Lafferty (2009)
- EastEnders Ray Taylor (1996-2005)
- Charles II: The Power and the Passion Clifford (2003)
- Lucky Jim Taxi Driver (2003)
- The Low Down Squash Player (2000)
- The Last Musketeer Tel Fletcher (2000)
- The Bill DS Glen Perrett (2000)
- Notting Hill Loud Man in Restaurant (1999)
- Trial & Retribution DS Dave Satchell (1997-2009)
- The Wave Alex (1997)
