= Joe Swash =

English actor and television presenter (born 1982)

- Born: Joseph Adam Swash; 1981 or 1982 (age 44–45); London, England
- Occupations: Actor; television presenter
- Years active: 1991–present
- Spouse: Stacey Solomon (m. 2022)
- Partners: Emma Sophocleous (2005–2008); Kara Tointon; (2008–2010)
- Children: 4
- Family: Shana Swash (sister)

Joseph Adam Swash (born 1981 or 1982) is a British actor and television presenter from London, best known for his role of Mickey Miller in the BBC One soap opera EastEnders and various presenting roles with ITV2. He won the eighth series of I'm a Celebrity...Get Me Out of Here! in 2008 and the twelfth series of Dancing on Ice in 2020.

== Early life and education ==
Swash studied at Highbury Grove School in Islington, and attended Anna Scher Theatre School.

== Career ==
=== Early work ===
When Swash was seven, he made his first television appearance in an Andrex advertisement. In 1991, when he was nine years old he played the role of a little boy pretending to be an orphan in You Rang, M'Lord? then when he was eleven he was cast in the film The Adventures of Pinocchio, as The Fighting boy with Dawn French and Griff Rhys Jones, and co-starring Jonathan Taylor Thomas, Richard Claxton and Correy Carrier. His character, known as The Fighting Boy because he scuffled with Lampwick over a gun, was turned into a donkey after going on a Roller Coaster. He made minor appearances in several television series such as Casualty, The South Bank Show, The Bill, Soldier Soldier and Nickelodeon's LOL: Laugh Out Loud. In 2002, Joe Swash appeared as a participant in the ITV documentary Club Reps.

=== EastEnders ===
Swash was about to give up on the idea of becoming an actor when he gained a role in BBC One soap opera EastEnders. He was cast as Mickey Miller and made his first appearance in EastEnders in April 2003 as a recurring character. Owing to a positive viewer reception, producer Louise Berridge turned Mickey into a regular character, and his on-screen family arrived a year later, including Mickey's little sister Demi, played by Swash's real sister, Shana. His son, Harry Swash, also appeared in the soap as his niece Summer Swann for a minimal period. On 26 February 2008, it was announced that Joe Swash, along with the actor who plays his stepfather, David Spinx, were being written out of EastEnders in a "big explosive storyline". He made his final appearance in July 2008. Since the announcement of his departure, Swash has been critical of the direction producers took with his character. He has blamed his three-month screen absence in 2005 on Mickey becoming little more than "light-relief".

However, he has expressed an interest in returning. He later reprised his role of Mickey Miller for two episodes on 19 and 20 September 2011, in order to coincide with his on screen brother's departure from the soap. He reprised the role for two episodes on 9 and 10 December 2024.

=== I'm a Celebrity...Get Me Out of Here! ===
In November 2008, Swash entered the Australian jungle to appear in the eighth series of the British reality show I'm a Celebrity...Get Me Out of Here!, which he went on to win.

From 2009 onwards, Swash has been part of the presenting team on the spin-off series I'm a Celebrity...Get Me Out of Here, NOW!. He co-presented the show with Caroline Flack (2009–2010), Russell Kane (2009–2011), Laura Whitmore (2011–2015), Rob Beckett (2012–2014) and David Morgan (2015).

In 2016, the show was renamed I'm a Celebrity: Extra Camp. Swash has co-presented this show with Vicky Pattison (2016), Stacey Solomon (2016), Chris Ramsey (2016), Joel Dommett (2017–2018) and Scarlett Moffatt (2017–2018). On 20 July 2019, it was confirmed that Swash had left the show and would not return for the series that year.

=== Dancing on Ice ===
In January 2020, Swash appeared as a contestant on the twelfth series of Dancing on Ice. Swash was partnered with Alexandra Schauman from week 1 until she sustained an injury in week 3. He was re-partnered with Alex Murphy in week 4. Swash and Murphy went on to win the series, beating Perri Kiely and his partner Vanessa Bauer.

=== Other television appearances ===
In 2009, Swash, along with ex-rugby player Austin Healey, appeared in the second series of Hole in the Wall, as a team captain.

In 2010, he was a team captain on What Do Kids Know? with Rufus Hound and Sara Cox on Watch.

In 2011, Swash presented the children's show Gimme A Break on the CBBC Channel. In 2011, Swash and Caroline Flack worked on ITV2 game show Minute to Win It as team captains. In November 2011 Driving Academy aired on the CBBC Channel, with Swash as presenter/narrator. In 2014, a brand new series was aired with celebrities taking part called Celebrity Driving Academy.

In 2013 and 2014, Swash was a regular team captain on ITV2 panel show Fake Reaction. In 2016, he joined the line-up on The Jump as a contestant.

In 2021, Swash appeared on the cooking show Celebrity Masterchef, when he made the final 3.

In 2023, he appeared in I'm a Celebrity... South Africa.

=== Theatre ===
Swash has appeared in several pantomime productions. In 2009 and 2010, he appeared in Snow White and the Seven Dwarfs in Bristol. In 2023, he performed as Buttons in Cinderella at the Central Theatre in Chatham, Medway. In 2026, he is due to star in Beauty and the Beast at the Alban Arena in St Albans.

=== Other work ===
In February 2009, Swash and TV presenter Tim Vincent broke a Guinness World Record for throwing the most pancakes to a partner as part of a challenge on Channel 4's The Paul O'Grady Show.

== Personal life ==
Swash was forced to take a three-month break from EastEnders in 2005 after he contracted meningoencephalitis.

On 16 June 2007, Swash's fiancée, Emma Sophocleous, gave birth to their first child, a boy. On 19 January 2008, it was announced the couple had separated. On 3 November 2009, Swash was declared bankrupt by London's High Court after failing to pay a £20,000 tax bill. Swash's agent Becca Barr said it was a mix-up and the actor was not in financial difficulty.

Swash was in a relationship with his EastEnders co-star Kara Tointon from 2008 to 2010.

Swash started dating Stacey Solomon in January 2016, after meeting on I'm a Celebrity several years previously. In 2019, the two announced that they were expecting their first child together, joining their family of Swash's son and Solomon's two sons. In May 2019, Solomon gave birth to their first child together, a boy.

Swash and Solomon got engaged on 24 December 2020, after being together for five years. In July 2021 the pair announced they were expecting a baby girl. On 5 October 2021 Stacey announced on Instagram that the baby had been born. On 24 July 2022 they were married in a small ceremony held at their home, Pickle Cottage, in Essex.

On 28 December 2022, Solomon announced she was eight months pregnant with her fifth child and third with Swash. The couple announced the birth of their second daughter on 11 February 2023.

== Filmography ==
=== Film ===
| Year | Title | Role | Notes |
|---|---|---|---|
| 1996 | The Adventures of Pinocchio | Fighting Boy | |
| 2002 | Shooters | Boy #1 | |
| 2011 | The Itch of the Golden Nit | Cameo Cast (voice) | Short film |
| 2018 | The Best of EastEnders | Mickey Miller | Direct-to-video; uncredited role |

=== Television ===
| Year | Title | Role | Notes |
|---|---|---|---|
| 1991 | You Rang M'Lord? | Boy | Episode: "Current Affairs" |
| 1991 | London's Burning | Mrs. Moody's Son | Series 4; episode 6 |
| 1992 | Rides | Micky | Episode: "Which One of You Is the Victim?" |
| 1992 | Me, You and Him | Boy on Phone | Episode: "Friday the 13th" |
| 1993 | ScreenPlay | Marley | Episode: "Safe" |
| 1994 | Little Napoleons | Schoolboy | Episode: "The Godfathers of Education" |
| 1994 | Between the Lines | Darrel Watson | Episode: "A Face in the Crowd" |
| 1994 | Soldier Soldier | Sam Garvey | 2 episodes: "Baby Love" and "Going Back" |
| 1997 | Breakout | Jason Cresswell | Television film |
| 1998 | Heat of the Sun | Pimp | Episode: "Private Lives" |
| 1999 | The Bill | Adam Summers | Episode: "Rock Bottom" |
| 2000 | London's Burning | Sean | Series 12; episode 16 |
| 2000 | Hope and Glory | Jed | Series 2; episode 4 |
| 2000 | Casualty | Denny Ingram | Episode: "Accidents Happen" |
| 2000 | Time Gentlemen Please | Gary's Friend #1 | Series 1; 3 episodes |
| 2003–2008, 2011, 2024 | EastEnders | Mickey Miller | Regular role; 370 episodes |
| 2006, 2008 | The Weakest Link | Himself | Contestant; 2 episodes |
| 2008 | Hole in the Wall | Himself | Contestant; 1 episode (series 1) |
| 2008 | I'm A Celebrity...Get Me Out of Here! | Himself | Series 8 – winner |
| 2008 | All Star Family Fortunes | Himself | Contestant; 1 episode (series 3) |
| 2008–2011 | Gimmie a Break | Himself | Co-presenter |
| 2009 | The Sunday Night Project | Himself | Panellist; 1 episode (series 2) |
| 2009 | Hole in the Wall | Himself | Team captain; 11 episodes (series 2) |
| 2009 | Celebrity Total Wipeout | Himself | Contestant; 1 episode (series 2) |
| 2009–2018 | I'm a Celebrity: Extra Camp | Himself | Co-presenter |
| 2009–2022 | Celebrity Juice | Himself | Panellist; 25 episodes |
| 2010 | What Do Kids Know? | Himself | Team captain; 10 episodes |
| 2010 | The Cube | Himself | Contestant; episode: "Celebrity Special" |
| 2011 | Minute to Win It | Himself | Team captain |
| 2011 | Let's Dance for Comic Relief | Himself | Participant; 1 episode (series 3) |
| 2011–2012 | All Over the Place | Himself | Co-presenter; 10 episodes |
| 2011–2014 | Driving Academy | Himself | Presenter / Narrator |
| 2012 | The Magicians | Himself | Participant; 1 episode (series 2) |
| 2012 | Mad Mad World | Himself | Special Guest |
| 2012 | Take Me Out | Himself | Contestant; episode: "Celebrity Christmas Special" |
| 2012, 2016, 2019, 2022 | Pointless Celebrities | Himself | Contestant; 4 episodes |
| 2013–2014 | Fake Reaction | Himself | Team Captain; 18 episodes |
| 2014 | Through the Keyhole | Himself | Panellist; 1 episode (series 2) |
| 2014 | Dinner Date | Himself | Contestant; episode: "Celebrity Dinner Date" |
| 2014, 2015 | Keep It in the Family | Himself | Special Guest; 2 episodes |
| 2014, 2020 | Tipping Point: Lucky Stars | Himself | Contestant; 2 episodes |
| 2015 | Reality Bites | Himself | Team Member; 1 episode |
| 2015 | Big Star's Little Star | Himself | Contestant; 1 episode (series 3) |
| 2015 | Celebrity Benchmark | Himself | Benchmarker; 1 episode |
| 2015 | The Chase: Celebrity Special | Himself | Contestant; 1 episode (series 5) |
| 2015 | The Keith Lemon Sketch Show | Himself | Series 1; episode 5 |
| 2015, 2016 | The Dog Ate My Homework | Himself | Panellist; 3 episodes |
| 2016 | Walliams & Friend | Himself | Episode: "Hugh Bonneville Christmas Special" |
| 2016 | The Jump | Himself | Contestant; 4 episodes (series 3) |
| 2017 | The Crystal Maze | Himself | Contestant; episode: "Celebrity Special 4" |
| 2019–2020 | Thomas & Friends | Sonny (voice, UK/US) | Series 24; 4 episodes |
| 2019–2020 | Dancing on Ice | Himself | Series 12 – winner |
| 2020 | Would I Lie to You? | Himself | Panellist; 1 episode (series 14) |
| 2021 | Celebrity MasterChef | Himself | Contestant; 10 episodes (series 16) |
| 2022–2023 | The Dengineers | Himself | Co-presenter; 15 episodes (series 7) |
| 2023 | I'm a Celebrity... South Africa | Himself | Contestant; 9 episodes (series 1) |
| 2023 | Joe Swash: Teens in Care | Himself | Presenter; documentary |
| 2023 | EastEnders: The Six | Himself | Presenter; 2 episodes |
| 2023 | The Great Pottery Throw Down | Himself | Contestant; episode: "The Festive Pottery Throwdown 2023" |
| 2025 | Batch from Scratch: Cooking for Less | Himself | Co-presenter with Suzanne Mulholland |
| 2025 | Meal Deals: Behind the Bargain | Himself | Presenter; two-part documentary |
| 2025 | Richard Osman's House of Games | Himself | Contestant; 5 episodes (series 8) |
| 2025 | Joe Swash: Britain’s Young Dads | Himself | Presenter; documentary |
| 2025–present | Stacey & Joe | Himself | With Stacey Solomon |
| 2026 | Who Do You Think You Are? | Himself | Participant; 1 episode (series 23) |

=== Books ===
- Joe's Kitchen. Glasgow: Pavilion Books. 13 October 2022. ISBN 978-0008560720.

| Preceded by Christopher Biggins (2007) | I'm A Celebrity, Get Me Out of Here! Winner & King of the Jungle; 2008 | Succeeded by Gino D'Acampo (2009) |
