= Gerry Cowper =

British actress (born 1958)

- Born: Geraldine Cowper; 23 June 1958 (age 68); London, England
- Occupation: Actress
- Years active: 1970–current
- Children: 2
- Family: Nicola Cowper (sister)

Geraldine Cowper (born 23 June 1958) is an English actress who is best known for playing Lisa in Only Fools and Horses and Rowan Morrison in the 1973 horror film The Wicker Man and Rosie Miller in EastEnders. In the mid-1980s she took the part of Clare France in After Henry on BBC radio and also appeared on television as Jim Hacker's daughter in Yes Minister.

== Career ==
Cowper was Clare France, the youngest of the female triumvirate in the BBC Radio 4 comedy After Henry, which also starred Prunella Scales and Joan Sanderson. Whilst Scales and Sanderson reprised their roles in the later television version, Cowper was considered too old to play a teenager on screen and the role went to Janine Wood.

Cowper also played Lucy Hacker, the daughter of Jim Hacker, in the BBC comedy series Yes Minister, although only in one episode. She featured in two episodes of Only Fools and Horses – "Tea for Three" and "The Frog's Legacy" – as Trigger's niece Lisa, and also appeared in Bachelor Father. In her early teens, Cowper made an uncredited appearance in Alfred Hitchcock's Frenzy (1972) and played Rowan Morrison in the horror film The Wicker Man (1973).

Just as David Spinx, her on-screen EastEnders partner, had small roles in the series prior to playing Keith Miller, Cowper had briefly played Lindsay, the mother of a schizophrenic youth named Matt, in April 2002. She appeared in an episode of Law & Order: UK in 2014 as Hope Corday.

== Filmography ==
Year	Title	Role	Notes
1972	Frenzy	Spectator at Opening Rally	Uncredited
1973	The Wicker Man	Rowan Morrison	
1982	The Return of the Soldier	Ward Nurse	

== Television ==
Year	Title	Role	Notes
1971	Bachelor Father	Jo	9 episodes
1975–1977	Play for Today	Various	3 episodes
1976	BBC2 Playhouse	Alison Fisher	Episode: "The Mind Beyond: Double Echo"
1977	General Hospital	Lynn Tyson	Episode: "The Breakthrough"
1979	Dick Turpin	Lucy	Episode: "The Champion"
1979	Telford's Change	Jenny Bell	8 episodes
1980	Enemy at the Door	Jenny Glover	Episode: "From a View to a Death"
1980	Yes Minister	Lucy Hacker	Episode: "The Right to Know"
1980	Little Lord Fauntleroy	Mellon	TV film
1985	Late Starter	Bargirl	1 episode
1986–1987	Only Fools and Horses	Lisa	2 episodes: "Tea for Three" and "The Frog's Legacy"
1988–2000	The Bill	Various	9 episodes
1993	Rab C. Nesbitt	Sylvie	Episode: "Rich"
1997	Trial & Retribution	Ann Taylor	2 episodes
2002–2006	EastEnders	Anne Lindsay/Rosie Miller	
2002–2015	Casualty	Eileen Price/Lorraine Wells	3 episodes
2009	Locked Up Abroad	Pauline	Episode: "Barbados: Busted and Pregnant"
2014	Law & Order: UK	Hope Corday	Episode: "Hard Stop"

== Personal life ==
Cowper is the older sister of actress Nicola Cowper and the twin sister of the late Jackie Cowper, who was also an actress.
