= Charlie G. Hawkins =

British actor (born 1991)

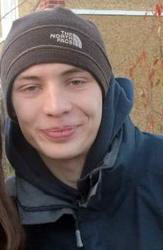
- Born: Charlie George Hawkins; 14 February 1991 (age 35); Islington, London, UK
- Occupation: Actor
- Years active: 2002–2014

Charlie George Hawkins (born 14 February 1991) is a British retired actor. He was born and raised in Islington.

His most notable roles are Darren Miller in the BBC soap opera EastEnders, which he was in from 2004 to 2011, and a cub scout named Tyrone in Ali G Indahouse.

Hawkins attended Holloway Secondary School in Islington, London, following which he attended Central Foundation Boys' School.

== Filmography ==
Year	Title	Role	Notes	Refs.
2002	Ali G Indahouse	Cub Scout/Tyrone	Film	
2002	Mrs. Meitlemeihr	Young Boy		
2003	Shanghai Knights	Newspaper Boy	Film	
2003	Seven Wonders of the Industrial World	Mudlark	TV series	
2004	Foyle's War	Brian	Episode: War Games	
2004–2011	EastEnders	Darren Miller	Regular role	
2007	Children in Need	Himself	Episode: 1x28	
2009	This Morning	Himself		
2009	The New Paul O'Grady Show	Himself		
2010	The Weakest Link	Himself		
2010	East Street	Darren Miller	Charity crossover between Coronation Street and EastEnders	
2012	The Ellington Kid	Nathan		
2013	Nymphomaniac	Young Lad 2 on Train	Film	
2014	Casualty	Miles Stones	Episode: Losing Grip	
