= Shana Swash =

British actress (born 1990)

- Born: Shana Frances Swash; 16 July 1990 (age 36); London, United Kingdom
- Occupation: Actress
- Years active: 1999–present
- Notable work: Demi Miller in EastEnders
- Television: EastEnders (2004–2006)
- Height: 5 ft 7 in (170 cm)
- Partner(s): Nick Jones (2016–present; engaged)
- Children: 1
- Family: Joe Swash (brother)

Shana Frances Swash (born 16 July 1990) is a British actress from London, and the sister of actor and television presenter Joe Swash. She is best known for playing Demi Miller in the long-running BBC One soap opera EastEnders from 2004 to 2006.

== Acting ==
In February 2006, it was announced that the role of Demi was to be cut, along with that of her on‑screen mother Rosie. Despite an online petition from fans pleading for them not to be axed, both characters left the show in July of that year.

Swash played Princess Jasmine in a pantomime version of Aladdin in the Winter of 1999, and appeared in BBC sitcom After You've Gone in an episode titled "Silence of the Clams".

Swash also starred in the 2007 UK tour of Girls Night, and in one of a series of educational videos produced by Orange, in which she played a girl who uses social networking sites inadvisedly.

Swash appeared in the short film The Crime Wave, and was one of the hairdressers in the 2008 series of Celebrity Scissorhands, a reality series which helped to raise money for Children in Need.

On 23 December 2008, Swash starred in an episode of the BBC Scotland soap opera River City, in a dream sequence as the daughter of Shona Malone.

In May 2009, Swash performed in Proud, a play at the Above The Stag Theatre.

Swash also featured in the 2016 film My Feral Heart playing the part of a young carer at a care home for adults with learning difficulties – a part for which she received a nomination for the BIFA for Best Supporting Actress.

Swash's latest on-screen role was on 21 September 2018. She appeared in an episode of daytime BBC drama series Doctors, titled "The Black Widow", in which she played a carer called Juliet Radnor, who was accused of killing her client in order to gain an inheritance.

== Personal life ==
In August 2021, she announced her engagement to Nick Jones via her Instagram page.

In December 2023, Swash and Jones welcomed their first child together; a daughter named Kitty Frances Swash-Jones.
