= David Spinx =

British actor

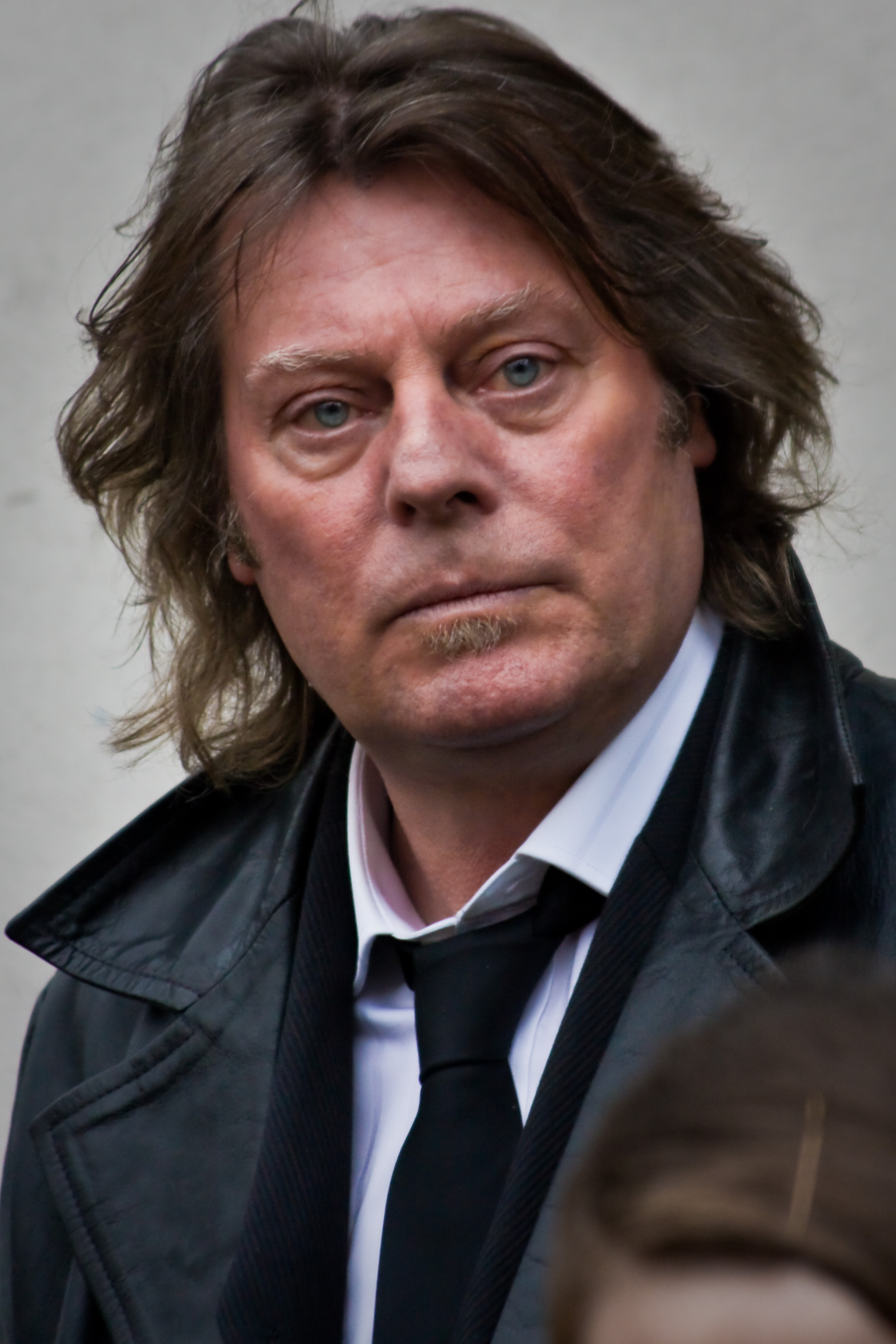
- Spinx in 2009 at Wendy Richard's funeral service
- Born: David C. R. Spink; 25 April 1951 (age 75); Ealing, Middlesex, England
- Occupation: Actor
- Years active: 1995–present

David Spinx (born 25 April 1951) is an English actor, probably best known for playing Keith Miller in the BBC television soap opera EastEnders from 2004 to 2008. He had previously appeared in EastEnders as a guest character in an episode in 1999 as the cellmate of Steve Owen and provided the voices on the radios in Barry Evans' cab firm. He made guest appearances in many other television series such as A Touch of Frost, The Bill and Hustle. David made his last appearance on EastEnders on 1 July 2008; his character was written out of the soap after having "run out of steam".

== Filmography ==
- Big Boys Don't Cry (2020 film)
- Casualty (2014)
- Snow in Paradise (2014
- Come Dine with Me (2010) – Himself
- EastEnders (1999) – Sharkey, (2004–2008) – Keith Miller
- Hustle (2004) – Security Guard
- New Tricks (2003) – File Sergeant
- Falling Apart (2002) – Men's Group Member
- Tipping the Velvet (2002) – Rough Man
- Jack of Diamonds (2001) – Kelly
- Conspiracy (TV) (2001) – Cook
- Holby City (2000) – Len Palmer
- Fifteen to One (2000) – Himself
- A Touch of Frost (1999–2000) – Dick Rycroft
- The Bill (1999) – Porter, (2003) – Trevor Saunders
- Grafters (1998) – Bailiff
- If Only.../The Man with Rain in His Shoes/Twice Upon a Yesterday (1998) – Vendor
- England, My England (1995) – Smith
