= List of fictional dogs in live-action television =

This is a list of fictional dogs in live-action television and is a subsidiary to the list of fictional dogs. It is a collection of various non-animated dogs in television.

== Television (live-action) ==
Name	Breed	Television program	Notes
Allen	Pug	The King of Queens	Spence's dog; about a parcel delivery man whose father-in-law comes to stay with his family in Queens, New York.
Apollo and Zeus	Doberman Pinscher	Magnum P.I.	Two guard dogs of the estate called Robin's Nest; TV series about a private detective who lives on the estate.
Apollo		Jim Henson's Pajanimals	A dog who loves science and riding on rocket ships.
Arlo	Yellow Lab	Brooklyn Nine-Nine	Rosa Diaz's dog.
Arnold	Pit Bull American	Life Goes On	The family dog, about the problems and joys of a family one of whose members has Down syndrome.
Arnold	Rottweiler	Entourage	Turtle's dog, about the life of an actor trying to find success.
Asta	Wire Fox Terrier	The Thin Man, and the series of Thin Man movies	Played by Skippy, Asta is the wire-haired fox terrier of Private Investigator Nick Charles and his wife Nora; about a couple who solve murders while their dog is usually underfoot.
Audrey	Cairn Terrier	Neighbours (Australian)	The Kennedy's dog; about people who live and work in a fictional suburb of Melbourne. Joined the show in 2001 and departed in 2011, following the death of the dog who portrayed her.
Backup	Pit Bull	Veronica Mars	Veronica's dog; about a high school girl who solves mysteries.
Bandit	Bulldog	Little House on the Prairie	The family's second dog in the books and the TV series.
Barkley	Sheepdog	Sesame Street	
Bear	Belgian Shepherd	Person of Interest	Reese's dog, about a former CIA agent who is recruited by a reclusive billionaire to prevent violent crimes.
Belle	Pyrenean Mountain Dog	Belle et Sébastien	Broadcast in France and later in England, about a six-year-old boy named Sebastien and his dog.
Betty	Chihuahua	Will Trent	Found and somewhat reluctantly adopted by the title character, an agent with the Georgia Bureau of Investigation.
Bijou	Jack Russell Terrier	Hooperman	Harry's mean dog, about a plainclothes policeman and his girlfriend in San Francisco.
Blacktoe	German Shepherd	Star Trek: The Next Generation	Captain Riker's dog; about the starship Enterprise and its crew.
Bismarck	Dachshund	Checkmate	Dr. Hyatt's dog; about the detective agency Checkmate, Inc. run by Don Corey and his partner who solves mysteries.
Bobientje	Old English Sheepdog	Samson en Gert	Samson's love interest who was an unseen character throughout most of the series, but was finally shown in the duo's first film Hotel op Stelten, where she basically looks just like Samson, only with a ribbon in her hair.
Boomer	Mixed breed terrier	Here's Boomer	In the TV series; about a stray dog that travels around helping people in trouble.
Boots	Mixed breed	Emergency!	Squad 51's mascot; about two specially trained firefighters who were part of the then innovative field of paramedics.
Bossy	Australian Kelpie	Neighbours (Australian)	Introduced in April 2012 as a replacement for Audrey who died in 2011.
Bouncer	Labrador Retriever	Neighbours (Australian)	Toby's dog; about three families who are friends living on a cu-de-sac.
Bouton	Mixed breed	Outlander	Small dog owned by Mother Hildegarde, who trained him to sniff out illness in the hospital where she worked. Bouton means button in French.
Brandon	Golden Retriever	Punky Brewster	Punky's pet; about a girl named Punky Brewster being raised by her foster parent.
Brown	Blackmouth Cur	The Westerner	Dave dog; about a basically decent, ordinary man who was handy with a gun.
Buck	Briard	Married... with Children	The family dog; about the lives of a hard luck salesman, his obnoxious wife, and their two children. (Later replaced by Lucky.)
Bullet	German Shepherd	The Roy Rogers Show	Roy's dog; about a rancher and friends doing good.
Buster	Beagle	The Wonder Years	Kevin's dog; a look back at growing up during the 60s when the turbulent social times made growing up an unusual experience.
Canolli	Sheepdog	B Positive	Gina's dog; a show about a woman donating her kidney to save her long-lost friend's life.
Celine	Chihuahua	Summer Heights High (Australian )	Mr. G's dog; lampooning Australian high school life from the viewpoints of three students.
Chamsky	Bulldog	Everybody Loves Raymond	Robert's dog; about Raymond and his family and his insecure brother dominating mother and crude father.
Charlie the Wonder Dog	Golden Retriever	The Late Show (Australian)	A Lassie-like character; a parody of other fictitious animal shows.
Cheddar	Pembroke Welsh Corgi	Brooklyn Nine-Nine	Captain Holt and his husband, Kevin's, dog; a police sitcom about the detectives of Brooklyn's 99th precinct.
Chester	Pomeranian	The Nanny	C.C. Babcocok's dog; about a woman who becomes a nanny for three children of a Broadway producer.
Cinnamon	Yorkshire Terrier	The Big Bang Theory	Raj's dog; about four geeks and a girl in humorous situations.
Claude	Poodle	The Beverly Hillbillies	Mrs. Drysdale's pampered pooch; about a poor backwoods family transplanted to Beverly Hills after striking oil on their land.
Cleo	Basset Hound	The People's Choice	"Sock" Miller's dog; about an ex-Marine and politician whose dog voice his master's dilemmas. (Owned by Jackie Cooper.)
Coco	Mixed breed	The Donna Reed Show	Donna's pet, about the humorous situations and problems of a middle-class family in the late 1950s and early 1960s.
Colin	Miniature Schnauzer	Spaced (British)	Daisy and Tim's dog; about two Londoners who meet by chance while flat-hunting.
Comet	Golden Retriever	Full House	The family dog; about a man who raises his three daughters in a house he shares with two adult male friends.
Diefenbaker (aka Dief)	Wolf-dog hybrid	Due South	The Montie's dog, about the adventures of a member of the Royal Canadian Mounted Police based in Chicago.
Digby	Golden Retriever	Pushing Daisies	Olive's dog; about a pie-maker with the ability to bring dead things back to life for one minute with his touch.
Digger	Labrador Retriever	Big Barn Farm (British)	One of the four animal friends for children; about the farmyard animals and exploring their friendships.
Dirty Dog		Pee-wee's Playhouse	A blue dog who plays the bass in the Puppet Band
Djinn Djinn	Havanese	I Dream of Jeannie	Jeannie's dog; about a United States astronaut who finds his life vastly complicated by his genie companion.
Doc	Mixed breed	Grey's Anatomy	About the lives of surgical interns and residents as they gradually evolve into seasoned doctors.
Dog	Mixed breed (dog actor Higgins)	Petticoat Junction	The girls' canine companion; about the misadventures of the family staff of The Shady Rest Hotel and their neighbor.
Dog	Basset Hound	Columbo	Columbo's dog; about an unkempt but clever police detective.
Doug	Chihuahua	The Sarah Silverman Program	Sarah's dog; about an unemployed and childlike, irresponsible woman who often insulting friends, family, and total strangers.
Dragon	Dragon	Wizards of Waverly Place	Dragon is a dragon who disguises itself as a dog in the normal world.
Dreyfuss	St. Bernard/ Golden Retriever mix	Empty Nest	The family dog; about a father living with his two self-supporting daughters.
Duke	Bloodhound	The Beverly Hillbillies	The family dog; about a poor backwoods family transplanted to Beverly Hills California after striking oil on their land.
Eddie	Jack Russell Terrier	Frasier	Martin's dog in the TV series, a sitcom about a psychiatrist with a radio show who lives with his father. (Played by Moose and Enzo.)
Eddie McDowd	Australian Shepherd/Siberian Husky	100 Deeds for Eddie McDowd	The series centers on Eddie McDowd, a bully who is transformed into a dog for his bad behavior.
Fang	Briard	Get Smart	Agent Smart's dog; a bumbling secret agent.
Fearless		Providence	Pet dog of Dr. Jim Hansen, a warm-hearted veterinarian who runs a clinic in his basement.
Flash	Basset Hound	The Dukes of Hazzard	Rosco's loyal companion; about two cousins living in a rural Georgia racing around in their customized 1969 Dodge Charger.
Fleegle	actor in dog costume	The Banana Splits	The guitar player; an hour-long packaged television variety program featuring a fictional rock band composed of four costumed funny animal characters.
Freeway	Löwchen	Hart to Hart	The Hart's dog; about a self-made millionaire and beautiful freelance journalist who spend their free time as amateur detectives.
Happy	Terrier mix	7th Heaven	The family dog; about the daily lives of a minister father and his family.
Henry	Basset Hound	Emergency!	Lived on the sofa in the station.
Hobo (aka London)	German Shepherd / Shiloh Shepherd	The Littlest Hobo	About a stray dog who wanders from town to town helping people.
Ivanna	Pomeranian	The Suite Life of Zack & Cody	London Tipton's dog.
Jack	Sheepdog mix	Little House on the Prairie	The family's first dog in the books and the TV series.
Jeb	Redbone Coonhound	VR Troopers	Ryan's dog; about three young men in virtual reality.
Jim	Brussels Griffon	Mike & Molly	Margaret Bigg's dog.
Joe	German Shepherd	Run, Joe, Run	Sgt. Corey's dog who is on the run.
Jupiter	Great Dane	I Dream of Jeannie	General Peterson's dog.
K9	Robot	Doctor Who	K9 had several incarnations over the course of the show and was most notably the constant companion of Sarah Jane Smith, the Fourth Doctor's companion.
Krypto (Shelby)	Labrador Retriever	Smallville	Shelby is a Labrador Retriever who temporarily acquired enhanced strength from experimentation with kryptonite. It is loosely based on Krypto, Superman's dog in the comics.
Lady Di	Bulldog	EastEnders	The Carter family's dog
Lassie	Rough Collie	Lassie	Lassie lived on a family farm. Originally, the pet dog of 11-year-old Jeff Miller, Lassie later belonged to seven-year-old Timmy Martin.
Levi	Golden Retriever	Sue Thomas: F.B.Eye	Levi is the real name of the first hearing dog of the real Sue Thomas on which the TV series is based, likely played by Jesse
Lucky	American Cocker Spaniel	Married... with Children	Lucky replaced the dog Buck of the earlier episodes.
Mario Hugo	Chihuahua	31 Minutos	
Marlowe	Anatolian shepherd	Simon & Simon	Rick Simon's dog, named after the famous detective Philip Marlowe.
Martin	Mixed breed	Downward Dog	About a dog who narrates his life with his beloved owner Nan.
Maximillion	German Shepherd	The Bionic Woman	A bionic enhanced laboratory test animal rescued by Jaime Sommers.
Murray	Collie-German Shepherd mix	Mad About You	Family dog.
Neil	St. Bernard	Topper	The ghost of a dog who died attempting to save George and Marion Kerby from an avalanche. Neil was very fond of martinis.
Nero	Yorkshire Terrier	F.C. De Kampioenen	Carmen Waterslaeghers' pet dog. She named him after the Belgian comic book character Nero.
Old Pop	Australian Shepherd	Big Barn Farm	
Pierrot	Poodle	Designing Women	Lori's dog; about a sportswriter and a fashion-designer who marry after a whirlwind romance and discover they have little in common.
Pippin	mixed breed	Come Outside	Auntie Mabel's pet dog.
Porthos	Beagle	Star Trek: Enterprise	Captain Jonathan Archer's dog.
Pouch	Mutt	Chicago Fire	Dog kept at the quarters of Engine Co. 51
Queequeg	Pomeranian	The X-Files	Scully's dog, taken in after "Clyde Bruckman's Final Repose."
Rabito	Various	Carrusel and Carrossel	Mario Ayala's pet dog.
Redbeard	Irish Setter	Sherlock	Modernised Sherlock Holmes' memory of his childhood best friend.
Rin Tin Tin	German Shepherd	The Adventures of Rin Tin Tin	Rin Tin Tin and an orphan called Rusty living on a US cavalry post helped establish order in the Wild West.
Rex	German Shepherd	Inspector Rex	Austrian-Italian TV series with police team and their K9 police dog solving crimes.
Rex	German Shepherd	Hudson & Rex	Law Enforcement Animal, K9 police dog, played by Diesel vom Burgimwald in Canada, based on Inspector Rex, Diesel is related to the dog that played Rex in Europe. Two of his real life nephews are his stunt doubles for action stunts.
Roger	Mixed breed	The Durrells	Gerry's dog; about an English family trying to survive on the Greek island of Corfu in the late 1930s; based on Gerald Durrell's three autobiographical books.
Rollo	Irish Wolfhound/Wolf mix	Outlander	Young Ian Murray's dog. He won him in a game of dice.
Roly	Poodle	EastEnders	Sharon Watts' dog; about the people of in a fictional London borough.
Rowdy	Labrador Retriever	Scrubs	Turk and JD's (stuffed) dog. Replaced with Steven, similar but slightly shorter stuffed Labrador, in My First Kill in season 4. In My Scrubs in season 6 Rowdy is found, allowing Turk and JD to have a dog each.
Rowlf the Dog	Mutt	The Muppet Show	One of the first Muppet characters, a scruffy brown dog with a rounded black nose and long floppy ears. He was created (and originally performed and voiced) by Jim Henson. Rowlf is the Muppet Theatre's resident pianist.
Samson	Old English Sheepdog	Samson en Gert	A puppet dog in a popular Flemish children's TV show who has a habit of mispronouncing words.
Satanás	Various	El Chavo del Ocho	Doña Clotilde's pet dog.
Schatzi	Dachshund	That '70s Show	Red Forman gave Schatzi to his wife Kitty to help her through menopause. Schatzi means 'little treasure' in German.
Schmeichel	Great Dane	Coronation Street	Great Dane owned by Chesney Brown from 2004 to 2011 and named after the Manchester United footballer Peter Schmeichel.
Scruffy	Possibly a Yorkshire Terrier	Ghost and Mrs Muir	Owned by The Muir Family, TV Series, based on the earlier movie.
Spark	Boxer	Pup Academy	Stray puppy who is one of the main characters; a show about a secret academy for puppies.
Speedy	Golden Retriever	The Drew Carey Show	Drew's dog; about the daily life of a guy and his friends.
Sprocket	Sheepdog	Fraggle rock	Doc's dog, lives in the workshop, intelligent.
Spunky	Mixed breed terrier	Happy Days	Fonzie's dog; Dr. Joyce Brothers pops in to help cure his mental woes.
Stan	Border Collie mix	Dog with a Blog	Talking dog (who runs an online blog) who is a pet of the James-Jennings family.
Stella	French Bulldog	Modern Family	Jay Prichett's dog. She was originally played by Brigitte in seasons 2 & 3, and replaced by Beatrice in season 4.
Stinky and Nunzio	Briard mix and Corgi	Dharma and Greg	Dharma's dogs.
Sweep		Sooty	A glove gray puppet dog
Terence	Lhasa Apso	EastEnders	Janine Butcher's dog, later owned by Billy Mitchell and the Jackson family.
Tiger	Bearded Collie	The Brady Bunch	Main character.
Thouser	robot dog	Kamen Rider Zero-One	Gai Amatsu' robotic dog.
Tramp	Sheep Dog	My Three Sons	Main character.
Vincent	Yellow Labrador Retriever	Lost	Walt's dog, originally owned by Walt's stepfather. Vincent is considered the only confirmed survivor on Lost.
Willy	Pug	EastEnders	Ethel Skinner's dog
Wellard	Belgian Tervuren	EastEnders	Robbie's dog; about the people of in a fictional London Borough.
Whitie		Boston Blackie	The pet that accompanied private detective Boston Blackie and lady friend Mary Wesley, in 1950s Los Angeles.
Wishbone	Jack Russell Terrier	Wishbone	The main character, portrayed by Soccer and voiced by Larry Brantley. A well-read dog who sees parallels between classic literature and the dilemmas he and his human friends face every day.
Yukon King	Alaskan Husky	Sergeant Preston of the Yukon	A Mountie and his dog fight villains in the Northern wilderness during the 1890s.
