= Wellard =

Fictional dog from the BBC soap opera EastEnders

- EastEnders character
- Kyte as Wellard in 2008
- Portrayed by: Zenna (1994–1998); Chancer (1998–2001); Kyte (2001–2008)
- Duration: 1994–2008
- First appearance: Episode 1041; 18 October 1994
- Last appearance: Episode 3630; 15 August 2008
- Species: Dog
- Breed: Belgian Tervuren
- Zenna as Wellard in 1994
In-universe information
- Owners: Mr Hammond (1994); Robbie Jackson (1994–2003); Sonia Fowler (2003); Gus Smith (2003–2008); Mickey Miller (2008); Vinnie Monks (2008); Bianca Jackson (2008)

Wellard (/ˈwɛlɑːrd/) is a Belgian Tervuren dog from the BBC soap opera EastEnders. His character first appeared in the series on 18 October 1994, and became EastEnders' longest-serving pet, before being killed off on 15 August 2008. Although the character is male, he has been played primarily by three female dogs: Zenna, her daughter Chancer, and her granddaughter Kyte. A fourth dog briefly served as a replacement for Zenna in 1996, when she was given time off from the show to have a litter of puppies.

Wellard was briefly written out of the series under executive producer Matthew Robinson, but returned when Robinson was succeeded by John Yorke. Wellard's owners for the majority of his duration in the soap were Robbie Jackson and Gus Smith. He was voted "Best Pet" at the 2008 Digital Spy Soap Awards, and named the UK's favourite soap opera pet in a 2009 Inside Soap poll. Wellard was a fan favourite, and although a storyline that saw him threatened with euthanasia for biting local café owner Ian Beale was poorly received by critics, his death drew generally favourable reviews.

== Development ==
Wellard's name is a portmanteau of "well hard", meaning "very tough". The character was originally played by a Belgian Shepherd (Tervuren) named Zenna, who was cast at the age of one. Producers had envisioned Wellard as a "rough, tough mongrel", and Zenna's owner, dog-handler Gill Raddings, explained: "She had the look they wanted and the ability to do what was needed on command." EastEnders' producers were initially unaware that Zenna was female, and had to find a canine double to serve as temporary replacement in 1996 when it transpired that she was pregnant, going on to deliver 10 puppies. Zenna was retired in 1998, as she was "losing her looks".

Zenna was replaced in the soap by her daughter Chancer, who was in turn succeeded by her own daughter, Kyte. Kyte played Wellard for seven years, longer than Zenna and Chancer. The dog, whose pedigree name is Minka Independance Kyte, came to the soap from Raddings' company Stunt Dogs, along with another EastEnders dog, Terence. She had previous experience in the television and film industry, having appeared on A Touch of Frost, The Jonny Vaughan Show, 102 Dalmatians and Gladiator. Raddings revealed that Kyte came to understand the words "action" and "cut", meaning the director would sometimes have to give an alternate cue such as "go" during scenes featuring Wellard, as the dog would become instantly alert upon hearing the usual commands, which appeared incongruous in scenes which called for Wellard to be relaxed. Kyte worked closely with Mohammed George, who played Wellard's owner Gus. George was afraid of dogs as a child, but after working with Kyte for three years, commented that they were so close he "sometimes [felt] like [her] dad."

Wellard was briefly written out of the show under executive producer Matthew Robinson, but returned in 2000, when Robinson was succeeded by John Yorke. A show insider commented: "Wellard just disappeared. It seemed odd because Robbie loved that dog and never noticed it had gone." An EastEnders spokesman stated of his return: "John Yorke believes Wellard should be an integral part of Robbie's character."

When a 2005 storyline saw Wellard threatened with euthanasia for biting local café owner Ian Beale (Adam Woodyatt), James Desborough of The People suggested that EastEnders producers were hoping to emulate the success of a storyline from rival soap opera Coronation Street, which saw fans protest the arrest of character Deirdre Rachid (Anne Kirkbride), going as far as to lobby the UK Parliament for her release. Desborough deemed the storyline "bizarre" and accused the BBC of being "desperate to boost flagging ratings". An EastEnders spokesman responded that it was simply "a funny story which we hope the nation will get behind."

In June 2008, it was reported that Wellard was to be killed off. A show insider explained: "Wellard has been a much-loved character and everyone will be sad to see him go. But if you think about it, Wellard was not a puppy when he arrived on Albert Square, so he would be over 100 in dog years by now. It makes sense for him to bow out of the show gracefully." Raddings commented: "I used to take Kyte on set everyday but I found the scenes when Wellard was put down too hard to watch so I asked someone else to take her to filming." At the time of his death, Wellard had been in EastEnders for 14 years, making him one of the show's longest-running characters, and its longest-serving pet.

== Storylines ==
In October 1994, Walford resident Robbie Jackson (Dean Gaffney) takes in a dog he assumes to be a stray, naming him Wellard. The dog's owner, Mr Hammond, locates him and demands him back, but Wellard later returns to Albert Square of his own accord. Robbie realises he has been mistreated and has run away. Mr Hammond admits to neglecting Wellard, and allows Robbie to keep him. Wellard fathers puppies with Grant Mitchell (Ross Kemp) and Nigel Bates's (Paul Bradley) greyhound, Frieda; however, the puppies are stillborn. When Robbie begins a relationship with a woman allergic to dogs, she gives him the ultimatum of choosing between her and Wellard: Robbie chooses Wellard. Several years later, when Robbie is due to leave Walford to live in India, Wellard is run over, delaying Robbie's departure. He is cared for by Robbie's sister Sonia (Natalie Cassidy), who gives him to her friend Gus (Mohammed George) after Robbie's departure. When Gus is involved in a minibus crash, Wellard is able to save his owner by leading him to a spot from where he can call the emergency services.

Wellard is reported to the police when he bites local café owner Ian Beale on the buttocks. He is taken away, with the possibility that he will be euthanised, but Gus and Deano Wicks (Matt Di Angelo) launch a campaign to save him, under the moniker "Walford One Owed Freedom" (WOOF). When Wellard is put on trial, Ian's partner Jane (Laurie Brett) presents character witness statements for the dog, written by Ian's children, Lucy (Melissa Suffield) and Peter (Thomas Law). Wellard is found guilty, but as a result of the statements, Gus is allowed to take him home as long as he keeps him on a lead at all times. When Gus leaves Walford to travel with his girlfriend Keisha (Suzie McGrath), he leaves Wellard with his friend Mickey Miller (Joe Swash). Mickey sells Wellard to Vinnie Monks (Bobby Davro), who intends to give him to his girlfriend Shirley Carter (Linda Henry). When it transpires Shirley does not want him, Vinnie gives Wellard to the Jackson family. Bianca Jackson (Patsy Palmer) feeds Wellard a chocolate, causing him to suffer from theobromine poisoning. He has to be euthanised, is cremated, and has his ashes scattered on the local allotment.

== Reception ==
Wellard was voted "Best Pet" at the 2008 Digital Spy Soap Awards. His death storyline was nominated in the "Tearjerker" category at the 2008 All About Soap Bubble Awards. In 2009, a poll by magazine Inside Soap named Wellard as the UK's favourite soap opera pet. He came second in a poll to find Britain's favourite TV pet in April 2006, losing to Lassie and in March 2008 was named the fifth best dog on television by Anna Pickard of The Guardian, behind Bouncer from Neighbours, Willy from EastEnders, Lassie and Dogtanian. It was noted in The People in July 1997 that Wellard was "a firm favourite with the soap's fans". The dogs received fanmail from viewers hailing them as the best actors on EastEnders.

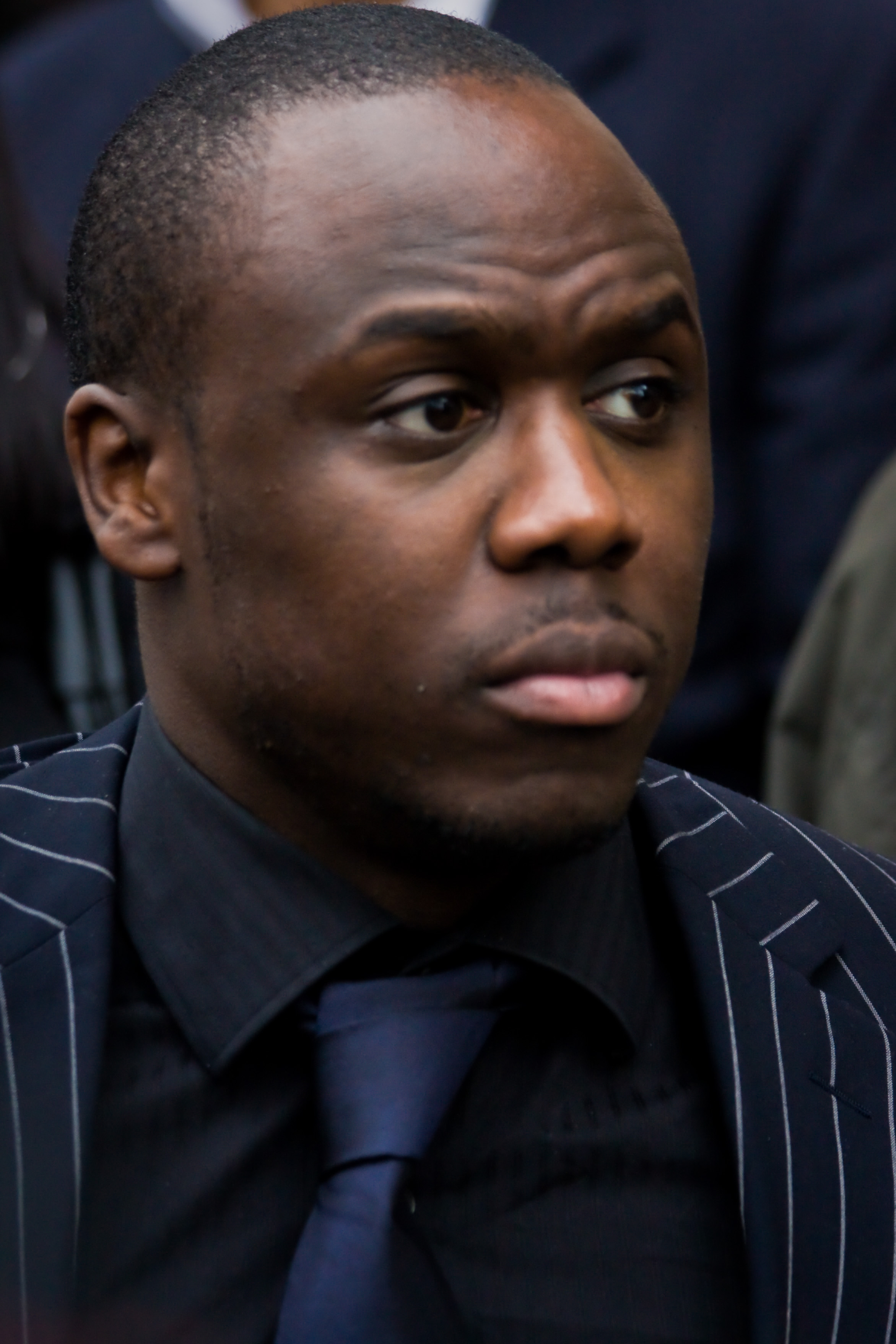
Mohammed George played Wellard's owner Gus Smith. The storyline which saw Gus campaign to free Wellard when he was detained under the Dangerous Dogs Act was poorly received by critics.

Zenna, Chancer and Kyte were occasional targets of professional jealousy from their human co-stars, and some television critics have suggested that Wellard was a better character than his owner, Robbie. When Michael Greco commented in 2002 that Wellard received better scripts than his character, Beppe di Marco, the Sunday Mirror's Ian Hyland wrote: "He should try being Robbie Jackson. Wellard gets better scripts and better girls than him." Similarly, Garry Bushell of The People compared EastEnders with rival soap Coronation Street following a 2003 scheduling clash, observing: "ITV had Richard Hillman's heavyweight murder confession. BBC1 gave us Robbie Jackson's heart-to-heart with Wellard. (Don't scoff – it's tough to play moving scenes with a dumb and soppy creature, but Wellard rose to the occasion.)". Derek McGovern of The Mirror criticised Gaffney's acting ability, observing: "Outside of Lassie movies I haven't seen a dog consistently steal scenes off a human the way Wellard used to pinch them from Dean." Gemma Bissix appeared in the show as a child actor from 1993 to 1998, playing Clare Bates. She commented on her return in 2008 that as a child, the dogs playing Wellard were better paid than she was. When Emma Barton, who played Honey Mitchell, was axed from the soap later that year, she spoke of her dismay that Wellard's death was being marketed as a bigger storyline than her character's exit. Roz Laws of the Sunday Mercury called it "particularly galling" that Barton's exit was upstaged by Wellard's death.

In January 2003, an Inside Soap reporter noted a "new phenomenon" of soap pets going missing without any explanation. They described numerous pets being absent for lengthy periods of time. They added that "most importantly" was the absence of Robbie's "beloved pal" Wellard. They added their disappointment that Gaffney was being written out of EastEnders and hoped for "one last emotional appearance" from the dog.

Hyland was critical of the 2003 storyline which saw Robbie leave EastEnders to move to Mumbai with his girlfriend Nita (Bindya Solanki) and her son Anish (Ali Zahoor). He explained that the aspect of the storyline which upset him most was Wellard being run over "so the scriptwriters could engineer the inevitable last-minute dash to the airport", questioning: "What's Wellard ever done to deserve that?" The storyline which saw Wellard threatened with euthanasia after biting Ian Beale received negative reviews from critics, deemed "bizarre" by James Desborough of The People, and the "longest, most tedious ever soap storyline" by Jim Shelley of The Mirror. Bushell simply wrote: "Wellard bit Ian Beale. Which one needs the Tetanus jab?" Tim Teeman of The Times called it the "daftest" storyline of the year, comparing it to a similarly ill-received and long-running storyline given to the unpopular Ferreira family.

Wellard's death drew generally favourable reviews from critics. The Guardian's Nancy Banks-Smith deemed Wellard to have "died with great dignity [...] Not, as a lesser dog might, making a meal of it." Grace Dent, also of The Guardian, wrote that she was an "emotional mess" when Wellard was euthanised, calling him "one of the true old guard of EastEnders". Andy Bollen of the Sunday Mail deemed it a shame Wellard had been killed off, calling him "the most convincing actor on the soap", while The Mirror's Maeve Quigley called Wellard's death sadder than that of human character Jase Dyer (Stephen Lord) shortly afterwards. Wise similarly opined that Wellard upstaged most of the cast, and that his death was more of a "tear-jerker" than the return of Jim Branning (John Bardon) who had been absent after suffering from a stroke. The Mirror's Kevin O'Sullivan commented: "a canine Oscar to the hound who played Wellard – the pedigree chum whose sad demise after 14 years of fouling Walford's pavements was genuinely moving." Shelley wrote that it signified the "[d]eath of the best actor in the show", and the South Wales Echo published the obituary:

Farewell, brave Wellard. Trusted friend; solid companion. Guardian of Jacksons and wee-er on settee cushions. Off you smelled – and gentle – into that Dark Night. Did you like that epitaph, you latest occupant of the Great Lane of Burst Black Bin Liners in the Sky, you? Fourteen years of playing canine clown, eh? I bet that bought a shed-load of Bonios. Anyway, sorry to see you go old thing. Let's hope your benign spirit will soon be visited upon that Bianca, though. Loved you, she did... but so loudly does she mourn. Tell her that great old age and the Grim Reaper mean nothing personal.

— South Wales Echo

In contrast, however, Laws felt that EastEnders was becoming too depressing, noting that Wellard's death came at the same time Jase was murdered and Honey and her husband Billy (Perry Fenwick) broke up, writing: "I feel like slitting my wrists when I tune in now. [...] There's only so much gritty realism we can take in our soaps, and EastEnders is really overloading us at the moment." In 2013, Digital Spy's Naomi Gordon opined that Wellard's death was one of the eight "saddest fictional dog deaths", saying "There wasn't a dry eye in the house."

== Impact on popular culture ==
Wellard is considered a "celebrity" dog, and during his EastEnders tenure, the dogs playing him would occasionally make personal appearances at events, including the dog-show Crufts in 1998, a fundraising appeal for the Victoria Animal Hospital in London in 2000, and the first All About Dogs Day at Notcutts garden centre in August 2008. Satirical impression series Dead Ringers referenced Wellard in a 2004 episode, running the continuity announcement: "Later on ITV1, new drama featuring the latest EastEnders star we've signed up for a ridiculous advance. Yes Wellard the dog is Barker, a cop on the edge with a drink problem and distemper." For Red Nose Day 2007, Aardman Animations created a Creature Comforts-style short featuring Wellard asking for money for Comic Relief, along with selling his offspring and being put in prison.

== See also ==
- List of fictional dogs
