= Terence (EastEnders) =

Fictional dog from EastEnders

- EastEnders character
- Terence in 2008
- Portrayed by: Terence (2001–2009); Uncredited (2009)
- Duration: 2001–2009
- First appearance: Episode 2192; 29 October 2001
- Last appearance: Episode 3922; 31 December 2009
- Species: Dog
- Breed: Lhasa Apso
In-universe information
- Other names: Princess Ivory Orchid III; Theirence
- Owners: Janine Butcher (2001–2004, 2008–2009); Terry Raymond (2001); Billy Mitchell (2001–2008); Pat Butcher (2008–2009)

Terence is a Lhasa Apso dog from the BBC soap opera EastEnders. The character first appeared in the series on 29 October 2001, after being purchased as an 18th birthday gift for Janine Butcher (Charlie Brooks) by Billy Mitchell (Perry Fenwick). Despite being portrayed by a male dog, Caspar, who was later renamed after his character, Terence's gender was subject to dispute throughout their tenure and they were regularly referred to as both male and female, often in the same scene, which led to them being branded "non-binary" by fans of the show and nicknamed "Theirence".

Another dog took over the role in 2009, appearing in several scenes before Terence was written out of the show by the producers, making their final appearance on 31 December 2009. Terence's storylines on the show included briefly being placed in a dog's home by Terry Raymond (Gavin Richards), moving in with Billy and being snatched back by Janine from the Jackson family following her return.

== Casting and characterisation ==
Terence's casting was announced in October 2001, on the day of their arrival. Terence was portrayed by a male dog named Caspar, who was later renamed Terence after the character. In real life, the dog belonged to Gill Raddings, who also owned the three dogs that portrayed Wellard during the character's tenure, as well as Zoe Slater's (Michelle Ryan) cat, Baby. Upon the dog's introduction, Raddings said: "Terence is great. He was written in as a permanent character a couple of months ago. [...] I was told that they'd written in a Lhasa Apso so would I find and train one. So luckily having travelled the length and breadth of the country I found a breeder who very kindly agreed to sell me one of her young top show dogs." Raddings taught him all the "acting" skills he needed, such as sitting up and begging and barking on command. Terence was bred in Aldridge by Jay-nie Johnston and Naomi Hardman. Stunt Dogs spotted Terence and picked him because of his temperament. Raddings also described Terence as a "great, bold, outgoing and bombproof dog and noted that he "absolutely loves all the fuss and attention he gets. The cast adore him." Speaking of Terence's casting, the producers said they expected them to be "a long-term star of the show."

Following a resurgence of interest in the character, it was confirmed by Raddings in June 2025 that Terence had died several years prior, long after being written out of the show by the producers. She added that after working on several productions, Terence had been retired by the writers of EastEnders and subsequently "lived out their retirement as a much loved family pet".

== Storylines ==
Terence arrives in Walford in a sports car, wearing a red bow and is gifted along with the car as a surprise 18th birthday present for Janine Butcher (Charlie Brooks) by her boyfriend Billy Mitchell (Perry Fenwick). The following day, Billy loses Terence whilst out walking them after being wound up by the locals. They are subsequently found by Beppe di Marco (Michael Greco) and Janine refuses to let Terence out of her sight. Their pedigree name is Princess Ivory Orchid III, however Janine subsequently decides to name them Terence after her and Billy liken their personality to Terry Raymond (Gavin Richards), with whom Janine is running a letting agency alongside, comparing them both as a little bit snappy, spoilt and always likes to get its own way, but lovable and affectionate when the mood takes it. Billy says to Janine that there is just one problem with the name Terence, telling her that the dog is a bitch, to which Janine says is perfect. Terence attends an obedience class and is brought along to a Halloween party with Janine and Billy. Terence later comes across Wellard on Bridge Street where they bark and end up chasing him. Janine dumps Billy and moves back in with Terry, however brings Terence without him knowing. Terry grows tired of Terence and urges Janine to rehome them. She attempts to sell them to Barry Evans (Shaun Williamson), however before he can arrive to collect them, Terry sends Terence to a dog's home. Billy is furious when he finds out about Terence being in the dog's home over Christmas and goes to collect them, ultimately becoming their new owner.

Terence attends a dog meet up in the park alongside the other dogs of Albert Square: Wellard, Keith Miller's (David Spinx) dog Genghis and Roxy Mitchell's puppy Albert. Terence is frequently looked after by Pat Butcher (Pam St Clement), and following Wellard's death, moves in with the Jackson family permanently to help Tiffany (Maisie Smith) and Morgan Butcher (Devon Higgs) cope with Wellard's death. When Janine returns, she snatches Terence back, claiming that if she is not able to stay with Pat, then neither is Terence, which upsets Tiffany. Terence later moves back in and is seen for last time at the Jackson's New Year's Eve party in December 2009, when they knock over a bowl of crisps Tiffany is holding.

== Reception ==
A BBC Online writer described Terence as being Albert Square's "glam dog". They list their "low points" as being abandoned by Janine, nearly being sold to Barry and being put in a dog pound by Terry. Terence proved popular among fans, with many describing them as their "all-time favourite pet", one of which said "Terence has had so many iconic storylines and side quests during their time on the show, they are just as much a main character as anybody else! Long live Theirence."

== See also ==
- List of fictional dogs
