= List of EastEnders characters introduced in 2001 =

EastEnders logo

The following is a list of characters that first appeared in the BBC soap opera EastEnders in 2001, by order of appearance. All characters were introduced by the show's executive producer, John Yorke. The first character to be introduced was Jill Marsden, a detective chief inspector who investigates the shooting of local hardman Phil Mitchell (Steve McFadden). April saw the introductions of: Ritchie Stringer (Gareth Hunt), an associate of Phil, Paul Trueman (Gary Beadle), the son of Audrey Trueman (Corinne Skinner-Carter) and brother of Anthony Trueman (Nicholas Bailey), and Donna Andrews (Alison Senior; Paula Jennings), the mistress of Trevor Morgan (Alex Ferns). Harry Slater (Michael Elphick), the brother of Charlie Slater (Derek Martin), and Gary Bolton (Bruce Byron), the father of Robbie Jackson (Dean Gaffney), made their debuts in May, whereas Margaret Walker (Susan George), a love interest for Terry Raymond (Gavin Richards), and Angel Hudson (Goldie), a gangster, made their first appearances in June.

Patrick Trueman (Rudolph Walker), the former husband of Audrey and replacement parental figure for Paul and Anthony, was introduced in September. Belinda Peacock (Leanne Lakey), Charlie's daughter, and Viv Slater, Charlie's deceased wife, appear for guest stints in October. October also saw the arrival of Janine Butcher's (Charlie Brooks) pet dog, Terence. November saw the only baby being introduced, Louise Mitchell (Rachel Cox), the daughter of Phil and Lisa Fowler (Lucy Benjamin). Also, November saw the first appearances of: Nathan Williams (Doug Allen), the illegitimate son of Roy Evans (Tony Caunter), Nita Mistry (Bindya Solanki), a love interest for Robbie, Jane Williams (Ann Mitchell), Nathan's mother, and Derek Harkinson, the childhood friend of Pauline Fowler (Wendy Richard). Roxy Drake (Tracy Brabin), a pimp who grooms Zoe Slater (Michelle Ryan), Kelly Taylor (Brooke Kinsella), a prostitute groomed by Roxy, and Tom Stuart (Shaun Dooley), a vicar, were introduced in December.

== Sue Miller ==
Sue Miller
- EastEnders character
- Portrayed by: Sadie Shimmin (2001); Victoria Willing (2002)
- Duration: 2001–2002
- First appearance: Episode 2054; 9 January 2001
- Last appearance: Episode 2304; 9 May 2002
In-universe information
- Mother: Margaret Wilson
- Husband: Neil Miller (until 2005)
- Adoptive daughters: Bex Fowler

Sue Miller, played by Sadie Shimmin in 2001 and Victoria Willing in 2002, is the adoptive mother of Sonia Jackson (Natalie Cassidy) and Martin Fowler's (James Alexandrou) daughter. Sonia gave birth to baby Chloe in 2000, but decided to give her daughter up for adoption. Chloe was placed with Sue and her husband Neil (Robin Sneller), a childless couple. Martin's mother, Pauline Fowler (Wendy Richard), Sonia and Martin are seen visiting Chloe occasionally at the Millers' house Sue and Neil changed Chloe's name to Rebecca.

In 2002, Sonia kidnaps Rebecca while Neil and Sue are out. Sonia tells their babysitter that she is a family friend, and snatches Rebecca, taking her to Walford. Neil and Sue work this out and trace her. While Sonia barricades herself inside her house, the Millers give Dot Branning (June Brown) fifteen minutes to persuade Sonia to hand Rebecca over before they phone the police. Just before the Millers are about to call the police, Dot successfully persuades Sonia to hand Rebecca over.

Sonia reads in a newspaper in 2005 that Sue and Neil have died in a car accident. This leads to her gaining contact with Rebecca again.

== Neil Miller ==
Neil Miller
- EastEnders character
- Portrayed by: Uncredited (2001); Robin Sneller (2002)
- Duration: 2001–2002
- First appearance: Episode 2060; 23 January 2001
- Last appearance: Episode 2303; 9 May 2002
In-universe information
- Wife: Sue Miller (until 2005)
- Adoptive daughters: Bex Fowler
- First cousins: Kay

Neil Miller, played by an uncredited actor in 2001 and Robin Sneller in 2002, is the adoptive father of Sonia Jackson (Natalie Cassidy) and Martin Fowler's (James Alexandrou) daughter. Sonia gave birth to baby Chloe in 2000, but decided to give her daughter up for adoption. Chloe was placed with Neil and his wife Sue (Sadie Shimmin), a childless couple. Neil and Sue changed Chloe's name to Rebecca.

Neil is first seen in January 2001, when Martin and his mother Pauline (Wendy Richard) visit Rebecca. In 2002, Sonia kidnaps Rebecca while Neil and Sue (now Victoria Willing) are out. Sonia tells their babysitter that she is a family friend, and snatches Rebecca, taking her to Walford. Neil and Sue work this out and trace her. While Sonia barricades herself inside her house, the Millers give Dot Branning (June Brown) fifteen minutes to persuade Sonia to hand Rebecca over before they phone the police. Just before the Millers are about to call the police, Dot successfully persuades Sonia to hand Rebecca over.

Sonia reads in a newspaper in 2005 that Neil and Sue have died in a car accident. This leads to her gaining contact with Rebecca again.

== Jill Marsden ==
Detective Chief Inspector Jill Marsden is played by Sophie Stanton. She makes her first appearance on 5 March 2001, when she investigates who shot Phil Mitchell (Steve McFadden) which is part of the whodunit storyline, Who Shot Phil?. She returns in 2002 and 2003, and returns again in 2009 for another whodunit storyline, Who Killed Archie? and returns again on 5 January 2012 for her third whodunnit storyline, 'Who's Stalking Phil?'.

When brought back in 2009, Marsden feelings are further explored in a segment of the BBC EastEnders homepage entitled 'Marsden's Video Diaries', documenting the character's thoughts on the storyline she is involved in. Marsden's relationship with Phil has been explored since her first appearance, the BBC describing their relationship as "romance in negative" and "Her ultimate dream is that some day she'll get [Phil]… behind bars."

== DS Thomas Burton ==
DS Thomas Burton
- EastEnders character
- Portrayed by: Cyril Nri
- Duration: 2001–2002
- First appearance: Episode 2078; 5 March 2001
- Last appearance: Episode 2234; 8 January 2002
In-universe information
- Occupation: Police officer

DS Thomas Burton, played by Cyril Nri, is a policeman who assisted his fellow chief detective Jill Marsden (Sophie Stanton) with investigating the shooting of Phil Mitchell (Steve McFadden) (see Who Shot Phil?) — the criminal hardman of Albert Square, a local community of the borough Walford in East London. The events of Phil's shooting occurs on 1 March 2001 after he antagonized several of his neighbours and fellow residents by the time his archenemy, Steve Owen (Martin Kemp), marries his wife Mel Healy (Tamzin Outhwaite) — who had a one-night stand with Phil on Christmas Day 2000. At the point where DS Burton joins Marsden in questioning Steve and Mel over Phil's shooting, he encounters Phil's cousin Billy (Perry Fenwick) and grows curious with his belief over the identity of two other suspected assailants; Phil's stepson Ian Beale (Adam Woodyatt) and love rival Mark Fowler (Todd Carty) over different reasons.

Nonetheless, Steve is implicated as the prime suspect. However, it is soon revealed the following month after Phil's shooting that the assailant is fact his ex-girlfriend Lisa Shaw (Lucy Benjamin). After gradually forgiving Lisa for the incident, Phil decides to frame his fellow nemesis Dan Sullivan (Craig Fairbrass) for the crime, after Dan tries to extort money from Phil and his godson Jamie (Jack Ryder). His plan to do so is halted when Burton visits Phil at his home to try and get information on who shot him, but Phil stalls him by claiming to have no idea about the identity his shooter. Once Burton leaves, Phil contacts Dan's old crime boss Ritchie Stringer (Gareth Hunt) and they hatch a plot to incriminate Dan. Later on that night, Phil phones DS Burton, telling him that Dan was the shooter and he is planning to finish him off for good. Dan corners and threatens to shoot Phil and extort money from him and Jamie again but Burton and an armed police unit rush over to the scene to take charge of the situation. Their presence alerts Dan who is armed, and he is consequently arrested. Burton and Marsden later charge Dan for Phil's shooting. Burton reappears at New Year 2002 when Little Mo Morgan (Kacey Ainsworth) confesses to striking her abusive husband Trevor (Alex Ferns) over the head with a clothes iron during an argument and he and Marsden charge her with attempted murder

== Ritchie Stringer ==
Ritchie Stringer
- EastEnders character
- Portrayed by: Gareth Hunt
- First appearance: Episode 2094; 10 April 2001
- Last appearance: Episode 2095; 12 April 2001
In-universe information
- Occupation: Mob boss

Ritchie Stringer, played by Gareth Hunt, is a mob boss who knows Phil Mitchell (Steve McFadden). He first appears in April 2001 when Phil contacts him to request a favor; conspiring with Phil against their mutual acquaintance, Dan Sullivan (Craig Fairbrass). It transpires that Dan had worked for Ritchie in the past, and so he does not suspect anything untoward when Ritchie provides him with a gun to do a raid on Phil. However, it is all part of Phil's plan, and Dan is caught by the police in the middle of the armed robbery. It soon becomes clear that the gun Ritchie had given Dan is the same gun that was used to shoot Phil, even though Dan never shot Phil and the gun itself had belonged to their common nemesis Steve Owen (Martin Kemp); earlier on, it was revealed that the shooter was in fact Phil's ex-girlfriend Lisa Shaw (Lucy Benjamin). Nonetheless, Dan is consequently blamed for the shooting when Phil confirmed this to the police without exposing Ritchie's involvement behind the crime.

Ritchie Stringer was 10/3 at Ladbrokes bookmakers as the culprit in the "Who Shot Phil?" storyline, despite not being one of the named suspects. When the BBC announced that actor Gareth Hunt was appearing in EastEnders, there was a massive betting flurry on Ritchie being the culprit. Bookmakers William Hill even "closed the book". William Hill spokesman Graham Sharpe commented that there were "dozens of calls" within half an hour of a 16/1 price being quoted and the bookmakers had nearly been "knocked over in the rush of punters wanting to place bets of hundreds of pounds on the actor". William Hill decided to reopen the book later in the week after "information from unofficial BBC sources had convinced them that [Gareth Hunt's] character [was] not the killer."

== Paul Trueman ==
Paul Trueman, played by Gary Beadle, appears between 2001 and 2004. Paul is introduced as part of the already established Trueman family. He is portrayed as a bad boy. Beadle left the role in 2004, following a suspension, reportedly for failing to learn his lines. In his exit storyline, Paul becomes a drug dealer, and Beadle has been critical of the storyline, suggesting it played into black, racial stereotyping. It is implied that Paul is killed upon his exit, though his death is not screened.

== Donna Andrews ==
Donna Andrews
- EastEnders character
- Portrayed by: Alison Senior (2001); Paula Jennings (2002)
- Duration: 2001–2002
- First appearance: Episode 2100; 24 April 2001
- Last appearance: Episode 2408; 8 November 2002
In-universe information
- Sons: Sean Andrews

Donna Andrews, played by Allison Senior (2001) and Paula Jennings (2002), is the mistress of Trevor Morgan (Alex Ferns), who first appears on 24 April 2001.

Donna first appears when Billy Mitchell (Perry Fenwick) spots her and Trevor entering Donna's house. A few days later, after much agonising over whether to tell Little Mo Morgan (Kacey Ainsworth), Trevor's wife, Billy takes Little Mo to see for herself. On 28 August, Little Mo's sisters, Kat Slater (Jessie Wallace) and Lynne Hobbs (Elaine Lordan), reveal that Donna is pregnant with Trevor's baby. Little Mo visits Donna several days later, and is urged by her not to let Trevor hurt her any more.

The following summer, Donna appears at Little Mo's trial for assaulting Trevor with an iron and gives evidence against Trevor. This proves fruitless as Little Mo is found guilty and given a prison sentence, although her conviction for attempted murder is quashed on appeal and she is released from prison within weeks of the verdict.

Donna next appears in October, when Trevor forces his way into her home in Swindon, attacks her and kidnaps their son, Sean. On his return to Walford, Trevor also captures Little Mo and attempts to kill them all in a house fire, only for Little Mo and Sean to be rescued, but Trevor and local fireman Tom Banks (Colm Ó Maonlaí) die in the resulting explosion, leaving Donna feeling Little Mo should be grieving for Tom, rather than Trevor. Donna makes her last appearance on 8 November, a week after Trevor's death.

== Harry Slater ==
Harry Slater
- EastEnders character
- Portrayed by: Michael Elphick (2001); Dale Hayes (2018 flashback); Stephen Leask (2025 flashback)
- Duration: 2001, 2018, 2025
- First appearance: Episode 2104; 3 May 2001
- Last appearance: Episode 7216; 30 October 2025
- Created by: Tony Jordan
- Introduced by: John Yorke (2001, 2018); Ben Wadey (2025)
In-universe information
- Occupation: Bar owner
- Family: Slater
- Father: Frederick Slater
- Mother: Mary Slater
- Brothers: Charlie Slater
- Sisters: Violet Slater
- Sons: Dermott Dolan
- Daughters: Zoe Slater
- Grandsons: Josh Goodwin
- Granddaughters: Jasmine Fisher
- Nephews: Brian Slater
- Nieces: Lynne Hobbs; Kat Slater; Belinda Peacock; Little Mo Mitchell
- Other relatives: Sean Slater; Stacey Slater; Hayley Slater; Freddie Slater; Lily Slater; Tommy Moon

Harry Slater, played by Michael Elphick, is the younger brother of Charlie Slater (Derek Martin). Dale Hayes portrays Harry in a flashback on 25 December 2018 and Stephen Leask appeared as Harry on 29 October 2025 through video footage. It transpires that Harry groomed his niece Kat (Jessie Wallace) as a child in 1983, and it is later revealed that he had raped her when she was 13 years old, thus making Kat pregnant with their twins; daughter Zoe (Michelle Ryan) and son Luke aka Dermott Dolan (Oisín Stack). Zoe is initially presented as Kat's sister but she is in fact Kat and Harry's daughter. Charlie understood the father was a boy from Kat's school and had no idea that it could have been his brother, so he decided to raise Zoe as his own daughter and Kat had to become her sister. Harry fled to Spain soon after the incident and didn't reappear until the death of his sister Violet – in 1988. After Violet's funeral, Harry quickly left again.

=== Storylines ===
Harry arrives in Walford to visit his older brother, Charlie. Most of the family welcome him, but Kat leaves the room without explanation whenever Harry enters. He starts a relationship with Charlie's close friend Peggy Mitchell (Barbara Windsor), and they soon get engaged and Peggy plans to emigrate to Spain, where Harry lives. Zoe announces that she is going with Harry to Spain to work in his bar, but a furious Kat refuses to let her go. Zoe storms out saying she's leaving and Kat follows. The two argue and Kat shouts that she is her mother. When Zoe demands that Kat tell her who her real father is, Kat shocks her by revealing that it's Harry, who had raped Kat as a child. Zoe tells Charlie as he was under the impression that Zoe's birth father was a boy Kat had gone to school with. He goes to find Harry and attacks him in The Queen Victoria public house, but is restrained by the punters. Charlie tells Harry to leave Walford and that if he ever sees him again he will kill him. He also tells him to end his relationship with Peggy and he does so by writing her a letter. Harry tells Charlie he is ashamed of his actions and that it has ruined his life. He admits that Charlie's late wife Viv (April Martin) knew what happened and kept it secret, only ordering him to leave, ruining Charlie's idealised image of Viv in the process. He goes to shake Charlie's hand to say goodbye, but Charlie – disgusted by him – spits in his face.

Kat confronts Harry and he says she must hate him. She denies that she hates him but just thinks he is a pervert. Kat reveals that she got pregnant from the rape and that Zoe is the child, having been raised as their own by Charlie and Viv. She says that Zoe hates him for what he did to her. Harry calls Kat a bitch and leaves in the back of a taxi. Kat later attempts suicide, but is found in the park by Zoe and rushed to hospital. Harry made his last appearance on 4 October 2001.

In February 2002, Charlie receives news that Harry has died from a heart attack in Spain. Harry leaves Zoe £18,000 in his will, but when Zoe sees how much the idea of taking anything from Harry is upsetting Kat, she burns the cheque – saying she does not need his money. In January 2015, Kat's grandmother Mo Harris (Laila Morse) reveals to Harry's great-niece Stacey (Lacey Turner) that Kat has received a cheque from Harry's will for £19,500, which has been left unclaimed for a number of years. Mo gives the cheque to Kat, which causes Kat to become upset over the bad memories, but she refuses to mention it to anyone. After Kat contemplates whether cashing the cheque is a good idea, her husband Alfie Moon (Shane Richie) tells her to consider using it to make a fresh start for their children, she ponders it and later tears up the cheque in front of Alfie. Mo then decides to impersonate Kat and cashes the cheque for herself. It later emerges that Harry had abused other young girls when Kat is visited by a compensation lawyer requesting her to give a statement over the abuse. In May 2015, Kat visits the convent where she gave birth to Zoe in 1984 and it is revealed to the viewers that Kat, unknowingly, had in fact had twins, a girl and a boy – meaning Harry has another child, a son, Luke Slater, aka Dermott Dolan. Later that same day, the nun who had helped Kat when she gave birth, gives her advice which culminates in Kat finally giving the police a statement on Harry.

Harry (played by Dale Hayes) appeared in a dream sequence, in an episode which focuses on the Slater family, on 25 December 2018. In October 2025, Zoe becomes the target of stalking. Her stalker plays old video footage of the Slaters from 1988 in the Vic which includes Harry (portrayed by Stephen Leask), upsetting Kat and Zoe.

== Gary Bolton ==
Gary Bolton
- EastEnders character
- Portrayed by: Bruce Byron
- First appearance: Episode 2110; 17 May 2001
- Last appearance: Episode 2133; 10 July 2001
In-universe information
- Occupation: Builder
- Wife: Helen Bolton
- Sons: Robbie Jackson; Kevin Bolton
- Daughters: Sophie Bolton; Jane Bolton

Gary Bolton, played by Bruce Byron, is the biological father of Robbie Jackson (Dean Gaffney), who appears in three episodes between 17 May and 10 July 2001.

Gary lived with Robbie's mother, Carol Jackson (Lindsey Coulson), as her boyfriend, and her daughter Bianca (Patsy Palmer) until a year after Robbie's birth. When David Wicks (Michael French) is revealed as Bianca's father in 1994, Carol tells Robbie she had left his father because he was having relationships with under-age girls; however, this is retconned when the character appears on-screen for the first time in 2001. He tries to get in touch with Robbie on his eighteenth birthday by phoning Carol's father Jim Branning (John Bardon), but Jim refuses to give Gary Carol's number.

In May 2001, Robbie and his half sister Sonia (Natalie Cassidy) go to Portsmouth to find Gary. They find his number when they see an advert for a builder called G. Bolton. When they go to his house, Gary gives Robbie a present he has saved from his first birthday and a cheque to make up for "backdated pocket money". Robbie then meets his half brother, Gary's son Kevin (Rupert Hill), and when he realises that Gary had left Carol to be with Kevin's mother, he throws the cheque back at Gary and leaves. In June, Gary arrives in Walford to talk to Robbie. He tells Robbie he will pay for him to go to college, but Jim tells him to leave. Later, in July, Gary returns to Walford and is happy to see old friend Mo Harris (Laila Morse). Gary and Mo spend the day reminiscing in The Queen Victoria pub, and when Robbie comes in, Gary gives him a cheque for £10,000. This is the last time Gary is seen. Robbie uses £1,000 of his money to travel to India, and gives Sonia £9,000 to pay her college fees.

== Margaret Walker ==
Margaret Walker
- EastEnders character
- Portrayed by: Susan George
- First appearance: Episode 2120; 11 June 2001
- Last appearance: Episode 2155; 24 August 2001
In-universe information
- Brothers: David Walker

Margaret Walker, played by Susan George, is introduced in episode 2120, first broadcast on 11 June, as a love interest for Terry Raymond (Gavin Richards). She appears for over two months, making her final appearance in episode 2155, first broadcast on 24 August.

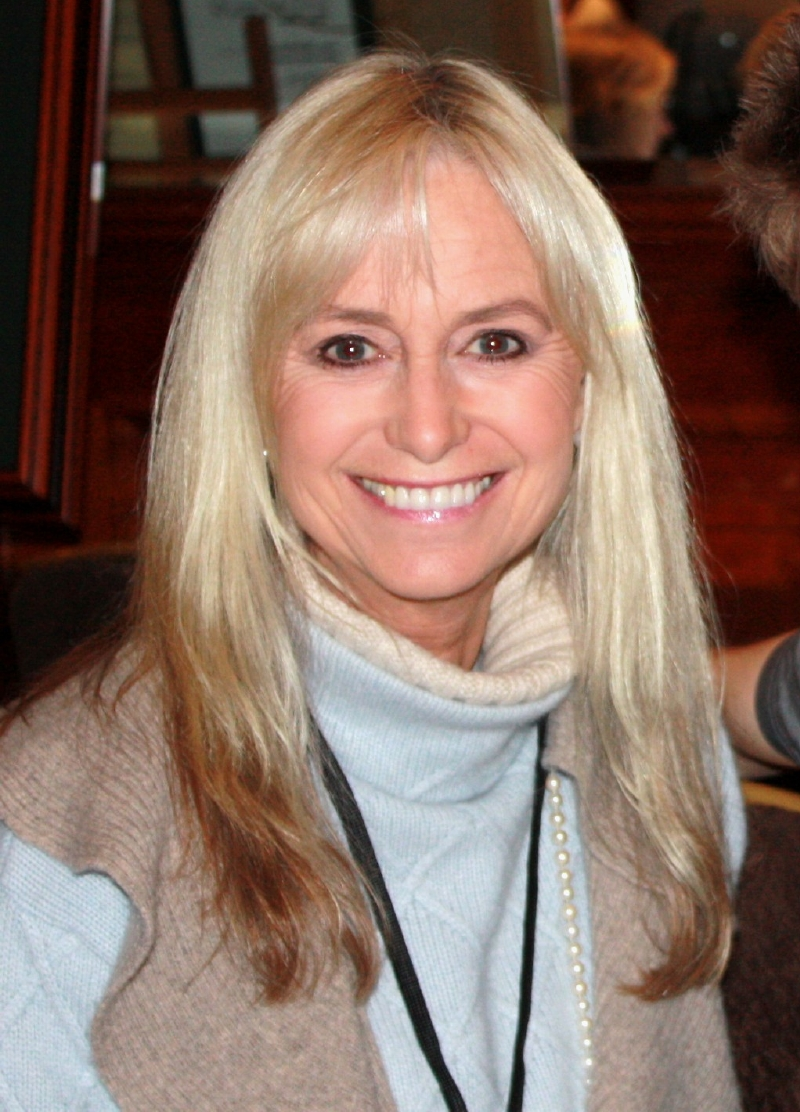
Actress Susan George appeared across two months as Margaret Walker.

She first appears when she begins renting a flat from Terry and Janine Butcher's (Charlie Brooks) letting agency. Terry and Margaret are attracted to each other and a relationship soon develops. Janine and Margaret do not get along, which makes things awkward for Terry as he and Janine live together. Janine grows extremely jealous of Margaret and Terry's relationship, and she plays various tricks to split them up. Margaret is not perturbed and vows to beat Janine at her own game, leading to numerous squabbles. When Janine discovers a photo of Margaret and another man, she immediately assumes the worst and informs Terry that Margaret is cheating on him. Margaret explains that the man in the photo is her brother, David Walker (Michael Fenner) who is dying of cancer and she is paying for his placement in a drug trial in America.

After continued hostility, Margaret tries to persuade Terry to throw Janine out, and he eventually gives in and arranges for Janine to move into one of his bedsits. Janine is aware of Terry's paternal feelings towards her, and she begins using emotional blackmail to manipulate him. Margaret eventually grows tired of all the game playing and so she and Terry book a trip to Paris to spend some time alone together. Janine is furious and Margaret goads her further by telling her that she plans to propose to Terry while they are away.

To prevent this, Janine goes to Margaret's property to steal Terry's passport, and whilst there she witnesses Margaret kissing her supposed brother goodbye. Janine becomes suspicious and when Terry tells her that he is planning to give Margaret £10,000 to help her brother, David, she tells him that Margaret is conning him and informs him about the kiss she'd witnessed. Furious, Terry goes to Margaret's to discover the truth, but she refuses to let him see her brother and after he insults her, she slams the door in his face.

Later that day Margaret confronts Terry demanding an apology. However Terry is adamant that she has been conning him for his money all along. She denies this, but he refuses to believe her. He brands her a prostitute and orders her to leave. After having one last fight with a smug Janine, Margaret goes home, where it is revealed that the man at her flat really is her brother after all. She puts him into a taxi and tells him that he is all that matters to her.

Although sources prior to the filming of this storyline had suggested that Margaret would be a sophisticated conwoman, this is never actually confirmed on-screen. The ending is left ambiguous and although the man at Margaret's flat turns out to be her brother, Margaret's final line – "We'll find the money somehow" – does not confirm he is dying.

== Angel Hudson ==
Angel Hudson
- EastEnders character
- Portrayed by: Goldie
- Duration: 2001–2002
- First appearance: Episode 2124; 19 June 2001
- Last appearance: Episode 2344; 19 July 2002
In-universe information
- Occupation: Gangster
- Wife: Precious Hudson

Angel Hudson, played by Goldie, is a gold-toothed gangster who is first seen in June 2001 when he attends a poker game that Steve Owen (Martin Kemp) is holding. His appearance is a huge shock to one of the other gamblers, Paul Trueman (Gary Beadle), and it is soon clear that they have unresolved issues. Later, during a break from the game, Angel tells Paul that he wants what he is owed: £30,000. He tells Paul that he has a week to pay up or he will make sure he disappears for good.

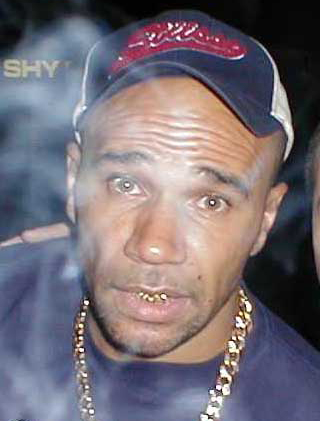
Goldie (pictured) portrayed Angel Hudson from 2001 until 2002.

Paul tries to get the money by stealing property from his mother, Audrey Trueman (Corinne Skinner-Carter), pawning the goods and gambling the money he receives. This fails and he ends up with less money than he began with. At the end of the week, Angel comes to collect his money, and when Paul fails to pay, Angel gives him a severe beating and trashes his mother's bed and breakfast. After more threats from Angel, Paul blackmails his brother, Anthony Trueman (Nicholas Bailey), into giving him the money. Anthony is the local GP, a respectable man with a worthy profession, but he has a dark secret. When he was 15 years old, after a heavy drinking session, Anthony had driven a car, hit a pedestrian and then left the scene. Not wanting to ruin his brother's chance of a successful career, Paul took the blame and subsequently served 18 months in prison. Paul threatens to tell their mother the truth unless Anthony gives him the money he needs. Anthony feels he has no choice but to oblige, so he takes out a loan and Paul pays Angel. Satisfied, Angel leaves, but tells Paul they will meet again.

Angel returns in June 2002 with more orders for Paul. Angel is soon to stand trial for murder and is using his wife, Precious Hudson (Judi Shekoni), as a fake alibi. He wants Paul to guard her until she can testify. Paul obliges and Precious moves to Albert Square. Paul is initially unaware that Precious is Angel's wife, so when she sets about seducing him, he has no qualms about having sex with her. When he discovers the truth, he is terrified of what Angel will do if he finds out. However, Precious does a runner, leaving Paul to face a furious Angel. Paul goes to get Precious back, while Angel holds his father, Patrick Trueman (Rudolph Walker), and his brother's girlfriend, Zoe Slater (Michelle Ryan), hostage. Luckily, Paul persuades Precious to return before Angel does any real harm. Their affair continues and it soon blossoms into love.

Later in the month, the family of the man that Angel had killed, tries to silence Precious by placing a bomb under her car. Garry Hobbs (Ricky Groves) receives minor injuries but, furious, Precious tells Angel she will only provide his alibi if he promises to divorce her. Angel agrees but, days later, Precious is kidnapped by the victim's family. They convince her that Angel will never let her go and that the only way to be rid of him is to get him locked up. Precious agrees and at the trial, denies being with Angel at the time of the murder. Precious assumes that this will be enough to put Angel away, but is shocked when he is found not guilty.

Paul and Precious decide to leave the country. However, Angel catches up with Precious before she can get away. He tells her that her betrayal doesn't bother him enough to kill her and that she can have her divorce on one condition – she stays away from Paul. If he ever finds out she and Paul are together, he promises to kill them both. Precious has no choice but to finish with Paul and leave Walford alone. Angel's last appearance is in July 2002.

== Patrick Trueman ==
Patrick Trueman, played by Rudolph Walker, makes his first appearance on 13 September 2001. The character was introduced by John Yorke as a replacement parental figure to the Trueman brothers, Anthony (Nicholas Bailey) and Paul (Gary Beadle), following the departure of Audrey Trueman (Corinne Skinner-Carter), a character killed off in the serial in September 2001. Patrick first appears at Audrey's "rum-fuelled wake" as her estranged husband. Walker was keen to play a comic element to the character, telling Larry Jaffee of Walford Gazette, "Before joining, I told the producer [comedy] is an area I would like to explore [with the character] because there was not enough of it [in the show]. [Patrick] treats a lot of things with a certain amount of humour. His way of escaping a problem is to find something funny to do or say or sometimes to get himself out of a tight corner. That's really the sort of foundation. I try to put as much humour as possible into the character."

== Belinda Peacock ==
Belinda Peacock
- EastEnders character
- Portrayed by: Leanne Lakey (2001–2003); Carli Norris (2016); Uncredited (2018, flashback); Cerys Wing (2025 flashback)
- Duration: 2001–2003, 2016, 2018, 2025
- First appearance: Episode 2176; 1 October 2001
- Last appearance: Episode 7216; 30 October 2025
- Created by: Tony Jordan
- Introduced by: John Yorke (2001, 2018); Louise Berridge (2003); Dominic Treadwell-Collins (2016); Ben Wadey (2025)
- Spin-off appearances: Slaters in Detention (2003)
In-universe information
- Other names: Belinda Slater
- Occupation: Businesswoman; Sales representative; Beautician
- Family: Slater
- Father: Charlie Slater
- Mother: Viv Slater
- Sisters: Lynne Hobbs; Kat Slater; Little Mo Mitchell
- Husband: Neville Peacock (until 2016)
- Grandmothers: Mo Harris
- Uncles: Harry Slater
- Aunts: Violet Slater
- Nephews: Dermott Dolan; Freddie Slater; Tommy Moon; Bert Moon; Ernie Moon
- Nieces: Zoe Slater
- First cousins: Brian Slater
- Other relatives: Jasmine Fisher; Josh Goodwin; Stacey Slater; Sean Slater; Kyle Slater; Lily Slater; Arthur Fowler; Hope Fowler; Hayley Slater; Cherry Slater; Charli Slater

Belinda Peacock (also Slater), portrayed by Leanne Lakey between 2001 and 2003 and Carli Norris in 2016, is introduced as the fifth Slater sister following the family's introduction in 2000. Additionally, the character also appears as a baby in a flashback on 25 December 2018. Belinda is the second youngest Slater sister and rejects her working-class roots, believing herself to be superior to her sisters, although she is not as classy as she makes out. Lakey appears in the role from 1 October 2001 to 25 December 2003.

Belinda returns for a guest stint between 11 and 21 January 2016, portrayed by Norris. Of her casting, Norris commented, "Becoming one of the Slaters is an absolute dream, especially to be part of such a big and important storyline.". Norris reprised the role and Belinda appears more regularly from 14 April 2016. Seven months later, on 11 November 2016, Belinda makes a previously unannounced departure from the show. Norris thanked her fans and added that she "loved" the role and hoped "to be back one day". Laura-Jayne Tyler from Inside Soap was shocked by her departure, writing "Please say it isn't so!"

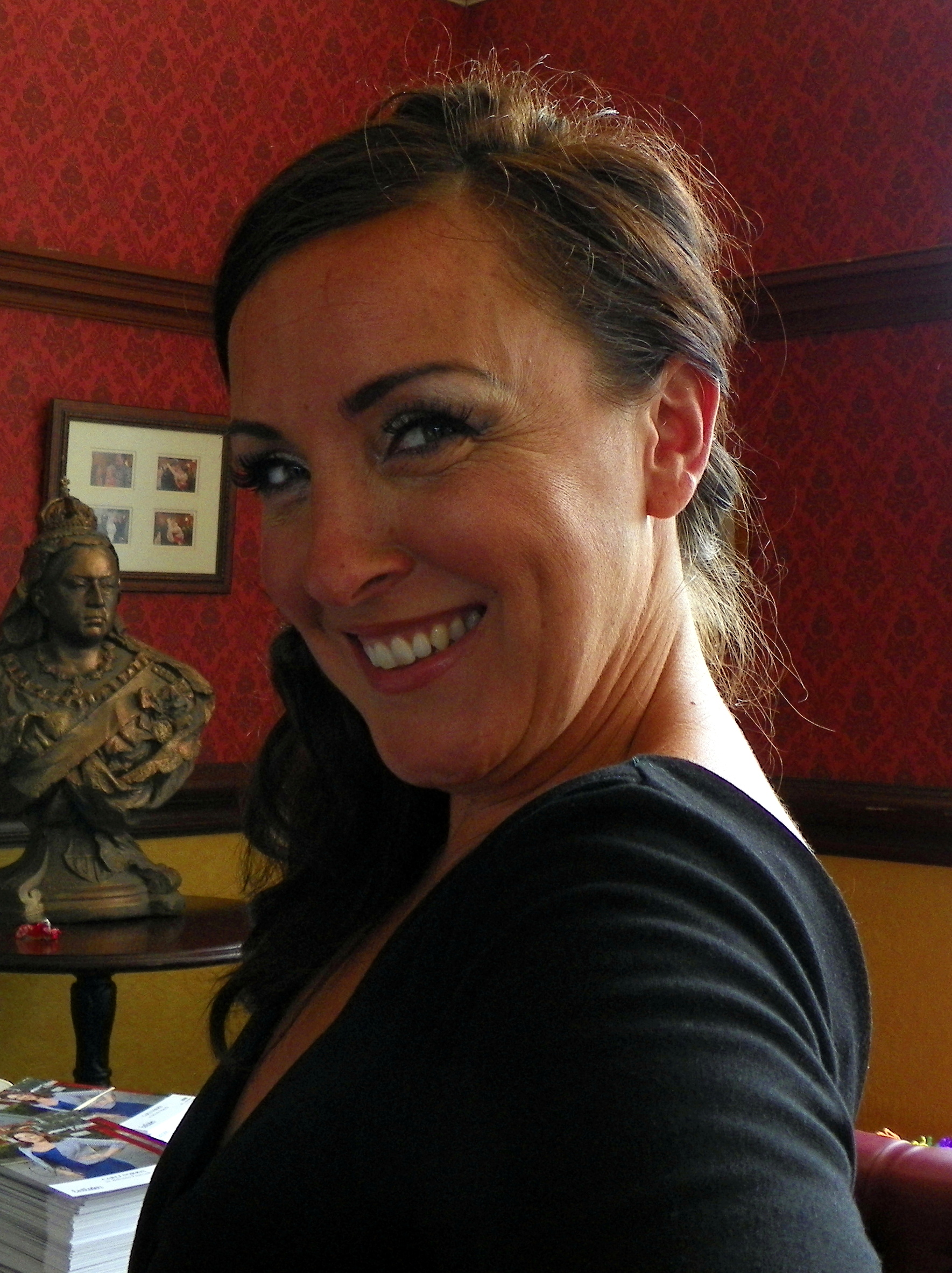
Carli Norris portrayed Belinda in 2016.

=== Storylines ===
Belinda is married to Neville Peacock (Gary Webster) who is wealthy and Belinda frequently brags about this to her sisters. She wears a blonde wig and speaks in an exaggerated accent, but reveals her true self at Lynne's hen night under the influence of alcohol. Belinda usually turns up in Albert Square when she is having marriage problems. She has brief flings with Jamie Mitchell (Jack Ryder) and her brother-in-law Garry Hobbs (Ricky Groves).

Although Belinda resides in Kent, within driving distance of Walford, she makes great use of her villa in Lanzarote. She often holidays there and her grandmother Mo Harris (Laila Morse) frequently visits, although Belinda often lets down her father Charlie. Belinda is mentioned 2008 when she promises Charlie that she is returning to spend some time with him, only then to cancel, leaving Charlie very upset. Belinda also makes a small cameo appearance in the DVD spin-off Slaters in Detention, where she is arrested after Charlie says she is the only normal daughter he has, but sees Belinda at the station and withdraws the remark. She is mentioned in December 2012 by her sister, Kat, when Mo and Jean Slater (Gillian Wright) take Kat's son Tommy Moon to visit her, and in February 2014 when Kat tells her husband Alfie Moon (Shane Richie) that she was with Belinda while she was actually trying to track down Stacey Branning (Lacey Turner).

Belinda returns in January 2016 after Charlie dies of a heart attack, and accuses Kat of killing him as she was arguing with him when he died. An explosive argument then ensues between Belinda and Kat over Charlie and Mo, which leads to Kat revealing that she had another son when she gave birth to Zoe, and that Mo knew about him. Belinda believes that Kat is just making excuses and leaves with Mo. Belinda returns later in January for Charlie's funeral, and eventually manages to make amends with Kat. However, when she makes a thoughtless comment about Stacey, who is suffering from postpartum psychosis, Kat throws a drink over Belinda and then storms off. Belinda catches up with her, and recalls the time when she, their mother Viv (April Martin), Little Mo and Zoe visited Ireland and saw Viv visit a couple with a boy; Kat realises that was in fact her son. When Stacey is discharged from the mother and baby unit, she arranges a family lunch and invites Belinda, Jean and Jean's new husband Ollie Walters (Tony O'Callaghan). Belinda learns that her cousin Kyle Slater (Riley Carter Millington) is transgender and when Jean is convinced Kyle is lying, Belinda encourages Stacey to stand up to her. Belinda then tells Stacey and Martin they will have to move out as Kat and Alfie promised to pay their rent for a year, which has now ended.

Belinda visits Stacey and Buster Briggs (Karl Howman) realises she is wealthy. He gets her address by offering a fish delivery and later goes with his grandson Lee Carter (Danny-Boy Hatchard) to her house to steal her koi carp. Lee tells his father Mick Carter (Danny Dyer) where they are, so Mick stops them and returns the fish as Belinda returns home and sees him through her window. The next day, Belinda visits the Carters and invites Mick and his wife Linda Carter (Kellie Bright) to her house for dinner; when they get there, Neville makes it clear to Mick that the couple are into swinging and will not allow Mick to refuse because they have CCTV footage of him in their garden. Mick tells Linda this, so she confronts Neville, accusing him of not having real intimacy in his relationship and wanting power over women. Belinda realises this is true so leaves with Mick and Linda, revealing Neville's CCTV cameras are fake. Neville follows them to Walford, where Belinda ends their relationship because she does not feel loved. He insults her and Mick punches him, forcing him to leave. Belinda then moves in with Stacey, Martin and Kyle. Neville gives Belinda £50,000 as a divorce settlement and she uses the money to open a beauty salon.

In August 2016, Belinda flirts with Grant Mitchell (Ross Kemp), much to the annoyance of his daughter Courtney Mitchell (Alice Nokes). They meet again and they later head to Belinda's flat to have sex, but are interrupted by her family. Stacey later discovers that Belinda's new beauty business, Elysium, is severely struggling financially after all of Neville's money was used to set it up. Due to Belinda's money being relied on to pay the rent monthly, Stacey's husband Martin Fowler (James Bye) rages at Belinda, ordering her to find the money. Belinda resorts to attempting to prostitute herself to wealthier men, however after joining forces with Lauren Branning (Jacqueline Jossa) to help her reduce costs and advertise through social media, Belinda eventually manages to find the rent money. Belinda begins a relationship with Masood Ahmed (Nitin Ganatra), although he initially fears she is after his money and they have sex. However the relationship doesn't last when Belinda asks Masood to call his ex-wife Zainab Masood (Nina Wadia) who is in the process of a divorce. Belinda finds an old card from her schoolfriend Maggie O'Shea (Zee Asha) who has recently been through a divorce and contacts her. They both come to a conclusion they should start a new life with their newfound freedom by travelling around Italy and they both leave Walford together.

== Viv Slater ==
Viv Slater
- EastEnders character
- Portrayed by: April Martin (2001); Natasya Rush (2004); Laura Curnick (2018); Scarlett Brookes (2025)
- Duration: 2001, 2004, 2018, 2025
- First appearance: Episode 2179; 5 October 2001
- Last appearance: Episode 7216; 30 October 2025
- Created by: Tony Jordan
- Introduced by: John Yorke
- Spin-off appearances: Pat and Mo (2004)
In-universe information
- Family: Slater
- Father: Stuart Mullins
- Mother: Mo Harris
- Adoptive father: Jimmy Harris
- Half-brothers: Billy Harris
- Half-sisters: Jean Harris
- Husband: Charlie Slater
- Daughters: Lynne Hobbs; Kat Slater; Belinda Peacock; Little Mo Mitchell
- Adoptive daughters: Zoe Slater
- Grandsons: Tommy Moon; Bert Moon; Ernie Moon; Freddie Slater; Dermott Dolan
- Granddaughters: Zoe Slater; Vivienne Hobbs
- Other relatives: Josh Goodwin; Jasmine Fisher

Vivienne "Viv" Slater is the late wife of Charlie Slater (Derek Martin), portrayed by April Martin. Viv first appears in her daughter Kat Slater's (Jessie Wallace) flashbacks in a near-death sequence when Kat attempts suicide in late 2001. Additionally, Laura Curnick portrays Viv in another flashback on 25 December 2018 and Natasya Rush portrayed her as a child in the spin-off episode EastEnders: Pat and Mo. She later appeared played by Scarlett Brookes in video footage in October 2025.

Viv's parents are Mo Harris (Laila Morse) and Stuart Mullins, and is the result of a one-night stand; she is brought up by Mo and stepfather Jimmy Harris (Alex King), with little contact with her father. After leaving school at 15, Viv meets Charlie Slater at a dance. They began dating and get engaged. After losing her virginity to Charlie, Viv becomes pregnant at 16. Mo, believing Charlie will not want to marry her, tries to force her to have an abortion; however, Charlie proves supportive and Viv gives birth to daughter Lynne (Elaine Lordan). Charlie and Viv marry and Viv goes on to have three more daughters: Kat, Belinda (Leanne Lakey/Carli Norris), and Little Mo (Kacey Ainsworth). As the girls are growing up, Viv becomes a hard, bitter, cold woman. With the death of her stepfather Jimmy, she has no fatherly guidance and resents the fact that she has no sons. She favours her oldest daughter Lynne, whilst Kat, Belinda, and Little Mo all vie for Charlie's attention, making Viv feel second-best to her daughters.

When Viv catches 13-year-old daughter Kat trying to run away, it emerges that Kat was raped by her uncle Harry (Michael Elphick) and is pregnant. When Kat says Harry raped her, Viv pretends not to believe her, then secretly orders Harry to leave and he flees to Spain. She then sends Belinda and Little Mo to live with Charlie's sister, Violet, to hide Kat's pregnancy. When Kat's daughter Zoe (Michelle Ryan) is born, Viv decides to raise Zoe as her and Charlie's youngest daughter. Viv dotes on Zoe but continues to treat her own daughters with contempt; although they loyally stick by her, they come to resent her harsh discipline. Eventually, Viv suffers a stroke and is nursed mostly by Charlie and Little Mo. She manages to make amends with all of her daughters before she dies at the age of 48.

In October 2001, near the two-year anniversary of Viv's death, the truth about Zoe's parentage emerges, and the family discover that Viv had known Harry was abusing Kat, tarnishing their image of her. In 2004, Lynne names her stillborn daughter Vivienne after her late mother.

In May 2015, it is revealed that Zoe is a twin and Viv had Kat's son adopted. Kat learns the truth: as Kat had passed out during Zoe's birth, Kat did not know about her son. Viv decided they could not pass off both being hers and she called for Mo to help. She did not tell Kat and only took Zoe so the boy did not become like his father, Harry.

== Terence ==
Terence is a Lhasa Apso dog that first appeared in the series on 29 October 2001, after being purchased as an 18th birthday gift for Janine Butcher (Charlie Brooks) by Billy Mitchell (Perry Fenwick). Despite being portrayed by a male dog, Caspar, who was later renamed after his character, Terence's gender was subject to dispute throughout their tenure and they were regularly referred to as both male and female, often in the same scene, which led to them being branded "non-binary" by fans of the show and nicknamed "Theirence".

Another dog took over the role in 2009, appearing in several scenes before Terence was written out of the show by the producers, making their final appearance on 31 December 2009. Terence's storylines on the show included briefly being placed in a dog's home by Terry Raymond (Gavin Richards), moving in with Billy and being snatched back by Janine from the Jackson family following her return.

== Nita Mistry ==
Nita Mistry
- EastEnders character
- Portrayed by: Bindya Solanki
- Duration: 2001–2003, 2019
- First appearance: Episode 2208; 5 November 2001
- Last appearance: Episode 5937; 13 June 2019
- Introduced by: John Yorke (2001); Kate Oates (2019)
In-universe information
- Occupation: Shop assistant
- Husband: Zack (1994–2001); Robbie Jackson (2005–2016)
- Sons: Anish Mistry; Sami Jackson
- First cousins: Samir Mistry

Nita Mistry, played by Bindya Solanki, first appears in the episode originally broadcast on 5 November 2001. She is introduced as a love interest for Robbie Jackson (Dean Gaffney). The character was written out of the series with Robbie in 2003. In a press report, executive-producer Louise Berridge commented "Dean and Bindya have contributed an enormous amount to the programme. However, we feel that the characters have reached the end of their natural course in the show, and they will both be leaving in Spring 2003. [...] It is always sad to be saying goodbye to a good double act, so we will be leaving the door open for both characters". On 28 May 2019, it was announced that Solanki had reprised the role for one episode, and Nita returned on 13 June 2019.

When Nita arrives, she is a widowed single mother to Anish Mistry (Ali Zahoor). She gets a job at the local shop, the Minute Mart, and becomes involved in the community theatre, where she meets Robbie. In 2003, Nita gets an offer from her family in India, asking her to return and they will support her and Anish. In February 2003, Nita takes up her parents' offer to return to Mumbai. Nita, Robbie and Anish leave for India.

In February 2010, Robbie returns for his sister Bianca Jackson (Patsy Palmer)'s wedding and reveals that Nita is six months pregnant. Nita later gives birth to a boy, Sami Jackson (Shiven Shankar) who appears in Walford in September 2015 with Robbie. Robbie reveals that he and Nita have separated. Three years later, Robbie visits Nita and Sami, returning with his son. He ignores phone calls and messages from Nita, so she returns to Walford to collect Sami. When Robbie barricades himself and Sami inside his flat, Nita threatens to call the police, but Robbie's sister, Sonia Fowler (Natalie Cassidy), persuades her not to. Robbie then unlocks the door and returns Sami to Nita. After saying goodbye, they leave again.

== Louise Mitchell ==
Louise Mitchell (also Fowler), played by Rachel Cox from 2001 to 2003, Danni Bennatar in 2008, Brittany Papple in 2010 and Tilly Keeper from 2016 to 2020, is a member of the Mitchell family and briefly part of the Fowler family. She is the daughter of Phil Mitchell (Steve McFadden) and Lisa Fowler (Lucy Benjamin), stepdaughter of Sharon Watts (Letitia Dean), granddaughter of Peggy Mitchell (Barbara Windsor) and the half-sister of Ben Mitchell (Charlie Jones/Harry Reid/Max Bowden). Louise's early storylines include Lisa lying about her paternity, her being caught up in her parents' relationship and her feud with Ben and him physically torturing her. Since her return in 2016, Louise's storylines have included her blackmailing Abi Branning (Lorna Fitzgerald) over her fake pregnancy, the death of Peggy, forming a friendship with Bex Fowler (Jasmine Armfield) and bullying Bex with as well as being the victim of bullying by Alexandra D'Costa (Sydney Craven) and Madison Drake (Seraphina Beh). Lisa returned after the prom disaster, where Louise suffered burns. Louise's storylines have also included relationships with Travis Law-Hughes (Alex James-Phelps) and Hunter Owen (Charlie Winter).

== Nathan Williams ==
Nathan Williams
- EastEnders character
- Portrayed by: Doug Allen
- Duration: 2001–2002
- First appearance: Episode 2201; 13 November 2001
- Last appearance: Episode 2312; 24 May 2002
In-universe information
- Occupation: Car dealer
- Father: Roy Evans
- Mother: Jane Williams
- Stepmother: Pat Butcher
- Half-brothers: Barry Evans
- Nephews: Jack Evans

Nathan Williams is a character played by Doug Allen. The character was axed after 6 months, reportedly because of Allen's failure to learn his lines adequately.

Nathan is the illegitimate son of Roy Evans (Tony Caunter), born, unbeknownst to Roy, out of an extramarital affair with his former employee Jane Williams (Ann Mitchell). Nathan makes his first appearance in Albert Square in 2001, after his mother, who is terminally ill with cancer, confesses to Roy that Nathan is actually his son.

Nathan initially refuses Roy's attempts to get to know him. However, after Jane dies (on the same day that Roy's grandson Jack is born), Nathan is left penniless with a bankrupt business, so he begrudgingly turns to Roy for help. Soon after, he moves in with the Evanses, much to the annoyance of Roy's other son Barry (Shaun Williamson), who resents Nathan and is furious with his father for betraying his dead mother. It also becomes clear that Nathan equally dislikes Barry and resents the fact that he had known and been brought up by his father, whilst he has only just met him. The pair spend much time winding each other up, with Barry usually ending up looking the fool.

Nathan quickly integrates into life in Albert Square, growing closer to his father and having a brief relationship with Walford resident Mel Owen (Tamzin Outhwaite). He starts working in the car lot with Roy, whilst Barry stays at home playing at house-husband and looking after his son Jack. Barry resents him even more for this and feels that Nathan is taking over his role as dutiful son. It seems as if Nathan can do no wrong, but it is the petty jealousy and sibling rivalry between him and Barry that is his eventual undoing.

In an attempt to exclude Barry and take his place in his father's heart, Nathan makes a plan to set Barry up and steal the affections of Barry's wife Natalie (Lucy Speed). His first advancement towards Natalie results in the pair kissing after Barry tells Natalie she should go out to the Vic Pub that night with Nathan instead of Barry they leave the pub and end up on a bench where Natalie tells Nathan that Barry did really well in getting cash that day that amounted to just over 5K for a car sale made at Evans and Son car-lot and that Barry entrusted Natalie that morning with the car lots new safe combination number and writes it on her hand to remember if he forgets the number to which he did and calls Natalie that day and placed the money in the safe thereafter! Nathan also writes down the number after clenching a kiss as the number is still written on Natalie's hand! Natalie is adamant that the kiss will go no further and is unaware of Nathan's cruel plan!! Despite further flirtations from Nathan, their kiss is a one-off occurrence. Undeterred, Nathan continues with his plan. Aware of Barry's past monetary blunders, and knowing that any subsequent mistakes will not be tolerated by Roy, Nathan trashes the car-lot and steals the money from the car-lots safe that same night after his planned flirtatious kiss and sets Barry up for the blame. The plan seems to be working, until Natalie pieces it together after finding the money in Nathan's jacket pocket and uncovers his greedy ruthless ploy. With Nathan's true character unveiled, Roy decides that he wants nothing more to do with him and Nathan gets his just deserts and is banished from Albert Square in mid-2002.

== Jane Williams ==
Jane Williams
- EastEnders character
- Portrayed by: Ann Mitchell
- Duration: 2001–2002
- First appearance: Episode 2208; 26 November 2001
- Last appearance: Episode 2236; 11 January 2002
In-universe information
- Sons: Nathan Williams

Jane Williams, played by Ann Mitchell, is a former employee and the former mistress of Roy Evans (Tony Caunter), who appeared between 26 November 2001 and 11 January 2002.

Jane is first seen when Roy appears at her house to confront her about him being named as the father of her son Nathan Williams (Doug Allen), who had arrived in Walford several days earlier and told Roy this. Jane assures Roy that he is and gives him a gold pen. As it emerges that Jane is dying from ovarian cancer, Roy begins spending more and more time with her, arousing the suspicions of Roy's other son Barry (Shaun Williamson) and Roy's wife Pat Evans (Pam St Clement). Eventually Roy is forced to confess to his family that Nathan is his son, much to the upset of Barry, as Roy had been having sex with Jane on the night Barry's mother and Roy's first wife Doreen had died. On 11 January, Jane peacefully dies of her progressing cancer on the same day Roy's grandson, Jack Evans (Samuel and Joseph Timson) is born.

Mitchell rejoined the cast of EastEnders in 2011 as Cora Cross.

== Derek Harkinson ==
Derek Harkinson
- EastEnders character
- Portrayed by: Ian Lavender
- Duration: 2001–2005, 2016–2017
- First appearance: Episode 2210; 29 November 2001
- Last appearance: Episode 5400; 27 July 2017
- Introduced by: John Yorke (2001); Sean O'Connor (2016)
In-universe information
- Occupation: Community centre manager Shop assistant
- Wife: Cynthia Harkinson (backstory)
- Sons: Alex Harkinson
- Daughters: Mary Harkinson
- Grandsons: Danny Harkinson

Derek Harkinson, played by Ian Lavender, originally appears between 29 November 2001 and 19 May 2005. On 4 November 2016, it was announced that Lavender had reprised the role for a guest stint during the 2016 Christmas period, during which he would be reunited with Martin Fowler (now played by James Bye). Lavender commented, "It was a lovely surprise to be back and I had a great time. It was brilliant to work with some old friends again, especially those who I only briefly got to work with before." He returned from 15 November to 29 December 2016 and again from 23 March to 27 July 2017. It was announced on 17 December 2017 that Lavender would not be returning to the show.

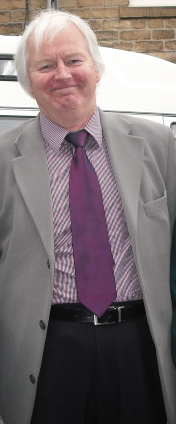
Ian Lavender appeared as Derek Harkinson between 2001 and 2005, before reprising the role in 2016 and 2017.

Derek, a childhood friend of Pauline Fowler (Wendy Richard), reappears in her life through her involvement in the Community Theatre. Pauline makes a play for him but he reveals he is gay. They decide to stay friends and Derek moves in with Pauline, becoming a new father-figure for her son Martin (James Alexandrou). He helps out with the fruit and veg stall, teaches Martin to drive, and takes the blame when Martin is caught growing cannabis. Derek gets in touch with his estranged son and daughter, Alex Harkinson (Ben Nealon) and Mary Harkinson (Mary Woodvine), and Alex's son Danny Harkinson (Josh Alexander). He has a long string of arguments with Pauline in 2005 and goes to live with Alex.

Derek returns to Walford 11 years later, joining the Walford Players to perform in their Christmas show. Kathy Sullivan (Gillian Taylforth) notices Derek loitering around Ian Beale's (Adam Woodyatt) house, where Pauline used to live, and confronts him, assuming he is from the council. Derek and Kathy meet again at Geraldine Clough's (Gwyneth Strong) play rehearsal and Patrick Trueman (Rudolph Walker) introduces them to each other. Derek and Kathy are both cast as a pantomime horse in the Christmas play, and he sides with Kathy when Geraldine asks who should be the director. Derek is overjoyed at the prospect of directing the play but during rehearsals, he is forced to reprimand Dennis Rickman Jnr (Bleu Landau) for watching Louise Mitchell (Tilly Keeper) and other girls undress. Much to Derek's disappointment, the first night of the performance isn't successful, after which, all the residents refuse to do the play any more. They eventually agree and the following performances are a success. After the show, Patrick fears that Derek fancies him and he feels uncomfortable when Derek invites him to stay with him and Alex. Patrick says he will think about it and Derek leaves Walford.

Derek returns a few months later to help Denise Fox (Diane Parish) with a meeting in the community centre. Derek and Denise organise an Easter fair and he tries to get Carmel and Denise talking again after they fall out. He accepts a job at the Minute Mart and irritates his co-worker, Honey Mitchell (Emma Barton), when he makes fun of her display and constantly takes breaks. He annoys her further when they both attend Kim Fox-Hubbard's (Tameka Empson) quiz night alongside Billy Mitchell (Perry Fenwick) and Derek has to join their team, but they win the quiz thanks to Derek's knowledge. When Derek confronts shoplifter Keegan Baker (Zack Morris), Honey is pleased to have him working at the shop. While talking with Honey, Derek reveals that he has been chosen as the new face of the Minute Mart. Yolande Trueman (Angela Wynter) then visits and asks to speak with Derek and she informs him that he could lose his job and be kicked out of the back to work programme for failing to disclose his criminal record. Derek has another run-in with Keegan when he tries to steal a magazine and Keegan throws the magazine at Derek and calls him a queer. When Honey leaves Derek in charge of the shop Yolande calls and tells him that he is sacked. Upset, Derek lashes out at Johnny Carter (Ted Reilly) and berates him for not standing up to Keegan and tells him about the struggles of being a gay man while it was illegal. Johnny tracks Derek down at his flat and questions why he quit at the Minute Mart. Derek explains that he has a conviction that he failed to disclose from when he was younger as he had a boyfriend who was twenty, which was below the age of consent for homosexuals and that he was arrested and imprisoned for nine months. Johnny tells him that he can get pardoned for his conviction and Derek agrees. In December 2017, Honey mentions that Derek has left Walford and she is short staffed.

== Roxy Drake ==
Roxy Drake
- EastEnders character
- Portrayed by: Tracy Brabin
- First appearance: Episode 2216; 10 December 2001
- Last appearance: Episode 2225; 25 December 2001
In-universe information
- Occupation: Pimp

Roxy Drake, played by Tracy Brabin, is a pimp who is first seen on 10 December 2001. She grooms Zoe Slater (Michelle Ryan), who has run away from home and is living on the streets.

Roxy finds Zoe a flat to live in. However, Roxy forces her to prostitute herself. Roxy and fellow prostitute Kelly Taylor (Brooke Kinsella) dress and make-up Zoe, but Zoe gets drunk on whiskey and vomits on her first client, much to the anger of Roxy. Some days later, Zoe's mother, Kat Slater (Jessie Wallace) comes looking for Zoe along with Anthony Trueman (Nicholas Bailey). They find her and try to take Zoe home, but Roxy tries to prevent Kat taking Zoe. This leads to Kat headbutting Roxy in the face. A humiliated Roxy then gets in her car and drives away, and has not been seen since.

== Kelly Taylor ==
Kelly Taylor, played by Brooke Kinsella, was introduced by executive producer John Yorke, in 2001. She was only due to appear in eight episodes as part of a prostitution/homelessness storyline featuring Michelle Ryan's established character, Zoe Slater, who runs away from home in late 2001 and lives at the same brothel as Kelly. However, the viewer response to Kelly was positive, so she was reintroduced as a regular at the end of 2002. The character remained in the serial until 2004, when executive producer Louise Berridge decided that her storylines had come to a natural end.

In the past, Kinsella had auditioned for the parts of Janine Butcher, Zoe Slater and Sonia Jackson, but had been unsuccessful. Kinsella has commented, "I went up for the part of every girl in the Square. I was closest to getting the part of Zoe. I did workshops with all the Slater girls but you have to say they are all dark and look very alike while I'm blonde. Obviously that wasn't the right one for me. It was hard at the time but I'm very glad because I love playing Kelly. She's totally different from any other character and she's good fun to play."

== Tom Stuart ==
Tom Stuart
- EastEnders character
- Portrayed by: Shaun Dooley
- Duration: 2001–2004
- First appearance: Episode 2205; 21 November 2001
- Last appearance: Episode 2759; 6 July 2004
In-universe information
- Occupation: Vicar

The Reverend Tom Stuart is a recurring character, played by Shaun Dooley. He is the vicar for the parish of Walford, and one of his earliest appearances is conducting the wedding ceremony of Dot (June Brown) and Jim Branning (John Bardon) on Valentine's Day 2002. However, he first seen in November 2001 conducting Louise Mitchell's (Rachel Cox) christening. He also consults Garry Hobbs (Ricky Groves) and Lynne Slater (Elaine Lordan) as they plan their wedding.

He returns in December 2001 to assist Dot and Jim as they are planning their wedding, right after Dot returns from a visit to Nigel Bates (Paul Bradley). His vicarly duties include conducting Jamie Mitchell's (Jack Ryder) funeral, and performing Kat Slater (Jessie Wallace) and Andy Hunter's (Michael Higgs) wedding ceremony that is crashed by Alfie Moon (Shane Richie). He also occasionally appears when Dot attends church meetings and suchlike. Reverend Stuart makes his last appearance when he conducts the funeral of a local pensioner after being asked by Martin (James Alexandrou) and Sonia Fowler (Natalie Cassidy). He is replaced off-screen by Reverend Stevens (Michael Keating).

== Others ==
Character	Date(s)	Actor	Circumstances
Diane Irving	9 January–14 April	Sheila Whitfield	A social worker who takes over from Ameena Badawi (Shobna Gulati) on the case of Chloe Jackson, when Ameena is promoted. She eventually finds Chloe a home with Neil (Robin Sneller) and Sue Miller (Victoria Willing), who rename her Rebecca.
George Hawkins	23–24 April (2 episodes)	Gary Lucas	A salesman who tries to sell his wares to Ian Beale (Adam Woodyatt) at his fish-and-chip shop. He is nicknamed "Cuban Man" by Beppe di Marco (Michael Greco), a minicab driver as he insists on smoking cigars in his taxi.
Norman Dunn	7 May	Roland Oliver	The father of Laura Beale (Hannah Waterman) who appears in Walford for Laura's wedding to Ian Beale (Adam Woodyatt) in 2001, along with his wife Edwina (Patricia Maynard/Gay Hamilton). He is very conservative and disapproves of Laura and Ian's marriage, as Ian had been declared bankrupt just a few months earlier. He threatens to disinherit Laura and when she refuses to postpone the wedding, he refuses to attend.
Edwina Dunn	7–10 May 2001; 9 December 2005 (3 episodes)	Patricia Maynard (2001); Gay Hamilton (2005)	The mother of Laura Beale (Hannah Waterman) who appears for Laura's wedding to Ian Beale (Adam Woodyatt) in 2001, along with her husband, Norman (Roland Oliver), but does not attend the ceremony as Norman disapproves of Ian being declared bankrupt in the past. She reappears in December 2005 to attend the trial of Janine Butcher (Charlie Brooks), who is accused of murdering Laura the previous year.
Kevin Bolton	17 May	Rupert Hill	The son of Gary Bolton (Bruce Byron), and half-brother of Robbie Jackson (Dean Gaffney). He appears when Robbie and his half-sister Sonia (Natalie Cassidy) track Gary down to Portsmouth. He is jealous of Robbie's presence in his father's life.
Ross Fletcher	31 May–21 June (10 episodes)	Ché Walker	Ross is Sharon Watts' (Letitia Dean) boyfriend who joins her in Walford a week after she returns from Florida. Ross tells Sharon that he will be staying around and has left his wife but once Sharon learns that Ross has been lying, she ends things with him and Ross leaves.
Anne Fletcher	14 June	Roberta Kerr	Ross Fletcher's (Ché Walker) mother.
Kay Bradshaw	14–19 June (3 episodes)	Vanessa Earl	A woman who Beppe di Marco (Michael Greco) has a one-night stand with. It is later revealed that she is Beppe's son Joe's (Jake Kyprianou) teacher, when Joe walks in on Beppe and Kay lying together on the sofa, and refuses to go to school the next day.
Sidney Gibbs	2–3 July (2 episodes)	James Marcus	Owner of a cleaning firm, Sid's Scrubbers, who are hired by Sharon Watts (Letitia Dean) to get Billy Mitchell (Perry Fenwick) to lower the prices of his cleaning firm.
David Walker	23–24 August (2 episodes)	Michael Fenner	The brother of Margaret Walker (Susan George). He is dying of cancer and she wants to pay for his placement in a drug trial in America. He is seen with Margaret, who puts him in a taxi and tells him that he is all that matters to her and they will "find the money somehow".
Jan Sherwood	17–21 September	Cherie Lunghi	A woman who Steve Owen (Martin Kemp) meets when he and his gang attempt a robbery targeting Jan's lover and wealthy businessman Alan Mills. When Steve seduces her, she tricks him and takes off with all the money, leaving him and his gang with nothing. It is however revealed that she and Steve are still working together: Steve fools his gang into thinking Jan had gone with all the money, and then meets up secretly with her and takes half of the money and never sees her again.
John Davies	11 October–2 December	Huw Higginson	The landlord of 15a Turpin Road. He doubles the rent on the flat, then offers to help Laura Beale (Hannah Waterman) with the money, but only if she will have sex with him.
Chris Wallace	16–19 October	Georgia Reece	An interior designer who redesigns e20 after a fire there, and has an affair with the manager Beppe di Marco (Michael Greco), and contracts a sexually transmitted infection from him, leading to her husband Tony (Andy Capie) discovering the affair and attacking Beppe.
Tony Wallace	1 November	Andy Capie	The husband of Chris Wallace (Georgia Reece), who attacks Beppe di Marco (Michael Greco) at the e20 Halloween party after Beppe and Chris had an affair and Beppe had given Chris a sexually transmitted infection.
Ernie Johnson	20 December 2001–25 January 2002	John Junkin	A pensioner who arrives unexpectedly at The Queen Victoria public house. Billy Mitchell (Perry Fenwick) confides in Little Mo Slater (Kacey Ainsworth) that Ernie was one of several staff members at a children's home who physically abused Billy as a child. Billy later breaks into Ernie's home to confront him over the abuse, shaming Ernie into moving away from Walford for good.
Stewart	21 December	David Baukham	A client who Roxy Drake (Tracy Brabin) brings for Zoe Slater (Michelle Ryan) to sleep with.
