= Robbie Jackson =

Fictional character from the British soap opera EastEnders

- EastEnders character
- Portrayed by: Dean Gaffney
- Duration: 1993–2004, 2010, 2015, 2017–2019
- First appearance: Episode 926; 16 December 1993
- Last appearance: Episode 5996; 19 September 2019
- Created by: Tony McHale
- Introduced by: Leonard Lewis (1993); Louise Berridge (2004); Diederick Santer (2010); Dominic Treadwell-Collins (2015); Sean O'Connor (2017)
In-universe information
- Occupation: Student; Call centre manager; Road sweeper; Taxi controller; Waiter; Video rental store manager; Market inspector
- Family: Branning/Jackson
- Father: Gary Bolton
- Mother: Carol Jackson
- Stepfather: Alan Jackson
- Half-brothers: Billie Jackson; Kevin Bolton
- Half-sisters: Bianca Jackson; Sonia Fowler; Sophie Bolton; Jane Bolton
- Wife: Nita Mistry (2005–2016)
- Sons: Sami Jackson
- Stepsons: Anish Mistry
- Grandfathers: Jim Branning
- Grandmothers: Reenie Branning
- Uncles: Derek Branning; Max Branning; Jack Branning
- Aunts: Suzy Branning; April Branning
- Nephews: Liam Butcher; Morgan Butcher
- Nieces: Bex Fowler; Tiffany Butcher; Julia Fowler; Whitney Dean (adoptive)
- First cousins: Bradley Branning; Lauren Branning; Abi Branning; Oscar Branning; Annie Carter; Joey Branning; Alice Branning; Penny Branning; Amy Mitchell; Ricky Branning; James Branning; Kevin; Rebecca

Robbie Jackson is a fictional character from the BBC soap opera EastEnders, played by Dean Gaffney. The character was introduced in 1993, but axed in 2003 by executive producer Louise Berridge. He made brief returns in 2004 and 2010 for two family weddings and again on 22 September 2015 to tie in with the exit of his on-screen mother, Carol Jackson (Lindsey Coulson) on 2 October 2015. The character's reintroduction was announced on 17 April 2017 and he returned permanently on 26 June 2017. The character left the series on 19 September 2019, which was confirmed as a permanent departure the following month due to concerns over Gaffney's off-set behaviour.

== Creation and development ==
=== Background ===
1994 was a "historic" year for EastEnders, as in April, a third weekly episode was introduced. Due to the programme's increased frequency, a number of new characters were introduced to the regular cast in the latter part of 1993 and early 1994. Among them were the Jackson family: mother Carol Jackson (Lindsey Coulson), and her four children, Bianca (Patsy Palmer), Robbie (Dean Gaffney), Sonia (Natalie Cassidy), and Billie Jackson (Devon Anderson), as well as Carol's partner Alan Jackson (Howard Antony). Though Carol and Alan were not initially married in the serial, and though Alan was only the biological father of Billie, the whole family took on Alan's surname.

Various members of the family began to appear sporadically from November 1993 onwards, but in episodes that aired early in 1994, the Jacksons moved from Walford Towers, a block of flats, to the soap's focal setting of Albert Square. Their slow introduction was a deliberate attempt by the programme makers to introduce the whole family over a long period. The Jacksons have been described by EastEnders scriptwriter Colin Brake as a "classic problem family".

=== Personality ===
Introduced as a 15-year-old school boy, Robbie was initially portrayed as troublesome; frequently playing truant, occasionally shoplifting and, as author Kate Lock suggests, "generally making a nuisance of himself". However, Lock observes that this aspect of the character was toned down eventually, and "the unfortunate Robbie became less of a lout and more of a [...] prat, forever mucking things up and being the fall guy."

=== Departure ===
In November 2002, executive producer Louise Berridge announced that Robbie Jackson was being axed from EastEnders, along with his screen girlfriend Nita Mistry (Bindya Solanki). The decision was allegedly a "mutual one" taken by producers, writers and actors. Robbie and Nita departed together on-screen in the spring of 2003.

=== Returns ===
Gaffney reprised the role briefly in 2004, when he returned as Robbie to attend his sister Sonia's wedding. A BBC source is quoted as saying, "[Dean] is very excited [...] After ten years in the show he was disappointed to leave. But he’s really pleased to be going back to Albert Square and seeing his old pals. He particularly missed working with Natalie [Cassidy]." The character's return was only scripted for a couple of episodes. Gaffney has expressed an interest in returning, commenting in 2006, "never say never [...] the scriptwriters have always been very complimentary about the character and Robbie could make a return next week, next year, or maybe never."

On 25 October 2009, it was announced that Gaffney would once again reprise his role, along with other Jackson family members Carol, Sonia and Billie. Gaffney is quoted as saying "I am really looking forward to returning to EastEnders for what looks set to be a really exciting storyline. I was thrilled when Diederick [Santer, executive producer] called me personally to ask for Robbie to return once more and working alongside Lindsey [Coulson], Natalie [Cassidy] and Patsy [Palmer] again makes it all the more special. I'm sure with the family being reunited it will mean that there must be a lot of drama in store." A source told entertainment website Digital Spy: "Everything's being kept hush-hush about the Jacksons' return at the moment, but there are certainly a load of questions to be answered. Will the frosty relationship between Carol and Bianca thaw? Are Sonia and Martin still together? And how will Robbie react when he learns of his beloved Wellard's death? Everyone's so pleased to have them back." The family will return for Bianca's second wedding to Ricky Butcher as part of the show's 25th anniversary. Executive producer Diederick Santer explained that he wanted great stories to get people talking, saying "The wedding is the perfect opportunity for us to bring back the much-loved Jackson characters – Carol, Sonia, Robbie and Billie."

Gaffney reprised the role again in late 2015, as part of Carol's exit storyline. Robbie returned on 22 September, and departed on 2 October along with Carol.

=== Reintroduction ===
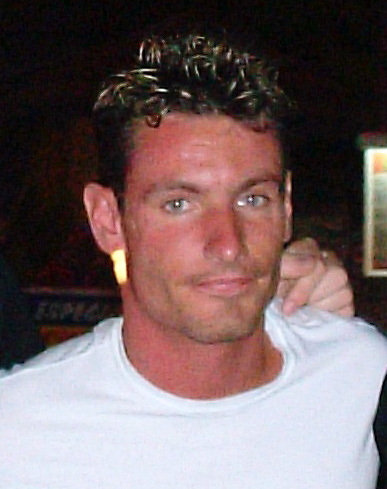
Dean Gaffney (pictured) was sacked from the soap in 2019 after allegations were made about him

Gaffney expressed an interest at rejoining the show's main cast in October 2015. In 2017, Gaffney was invited to return by the show's executive producer, Sean O'Connor, which Gaffney called "a privilege". When O'Connor called him to offer him the role, Gaffney became emotional and found the call unexpected. Robbie's reintroduction was publicised on 17 April 2017. Of his return, Gaffney said, "I'm really happy to be back. I'm so lucky to be given the chance to work again with such a talented group of people. A big thank you to Sean and the team. I think it's going to be a lot of fun." O'Connor expressed his delight at Robbie's reintroduction, branding the character "one of EastEnders' most loved and most popular characters". He quipped that "Bridge Street Market has never quite been the same without Robbie policing it in his hi-viz jacket" and added, "Dean brings a wonderful warmth and fun to his portrayal of Robbie and I'm sure that audiences will take him to their hearts again, just as they have always done."

Gaffney signed a one-year contract upon his return, securing Robbie's appearance until 2018. He also explained that Robbie returns "with a vengeance", promising that he would not return to be a background character, and added that Robbie would be "straight back on the square causing some ructions with the market traders." Gaffney said that Robbie returns with more maturity, although his job as market inspector leads him to clash with Martin Fowler (James Bye), Donna Yates (Lisa Hammond) and Kush Kazemi (Davood Ghadami). The actor compared Robbie to the character David Brent from the BBC mockumentry The Office, and noted that due to his job as a road sweeper, Robbie "knows the market like the back of his hand." Robbie returned in episode 5517, broadcast on 26 June 2017.

=== Departure (2019) ===
In the episode broadcast on 19 September 2019, Robbie left Walford to look after his son Sami after he was involved in an accident. Gaffney's departure on the show was not announced. However, on 13 October, it was confirmed that these scenes had been Gaffney's final ones, as bosses had decided not to renew his contract following allegations that he had asked a stranger to send him inappropriate photos.

== Storylines ==
=== 1993–2015 ===
Robbie Jackson arrives in Albert Square from 1993 with the rest of the Jackson family: mother Carol Jackson (Lindsey Coulson), her partner Alan Jackson (Howard Antony), and his half-siblings, Bianca (Patsy Palmer), Sonia (Natalie Cassidy) and Billie Jackson (Devon Anderson). Initially a troublesome teen, Robbie has little success at school and is frequently in trouble for his behaviour, along with his friend Kevin (John Pickard). In November 1994, the pair find a dog which Robbie names Wellard. Robbie manages to persuade the dog's owner to relinquish care to him, after he discovers that Wellard was being neglected, and Wellard then becomes Robbie's pet. As he ages, Robbie becomes more responsible, but has little success in anything he chooses to do. He has several careers in Albert Square including radio control for the Evans' mini cab company, a job as manager in the local video rental store, and is hoping to return to the video shop.

During his time on the square, Robbie is generally unsuccessful with women. He has a crush on Sarah Hills (Daniela Denby-Ashe) and is responsible for taking her virginity in 1997. Although Sarah initiated the intercourse, she is unable to cope with what has occurred and runs away, leaving her father Ted Hills (Brian Croucher) to assume that Robbie has raped his daughter. Ted assaults Robbie; he is hospitalised and has to undergo a splenectomy, before Sarah returns to reveal the truth. Robbie forms a more serious relationship with Kerry Skinner (Gemma McCluskie) in 2000. They get engaged; however, when Robbie discovers that Kerry has cheated on him with Darren (Stephen Hoyle), the engagement ends.

As such, Robbie often gets involved in conflicts with many people. He has a quarrel with gangster Steve Owen (Martin Kemp) after the latter framed Robbie's friend Matthew Rose (Joe Absolom) for killing Steve's former girlfriend Saskia Duncan (Deborah Sheridan-Taylor); when in fact Steve had killed her in self-defence.

Soon Robbie decides to track down his birth father, Gary Bolton (Bruce Byron), in 2001. He finds him in Portsmouth, and discovers he has a half brother, Kevin (Rupert Hill). The meeting ends up being a disappointment for Robbie, when he discovers Gary had left his own mother to be with his half-brother's mother. He leaves angrily, but Gary later traces Robbie to Walford and gives him a large cheque which allows him to travel around India, and pay for sister Sonia's nursing training.

When Robbie comes back to Walford, he meets young widow Nita Mistry (Bindya Solanki) and they begin a slow-burning relationship despite Nita's initial reticence. Eventually they move in together with Nita's son Anish (Ali Zahoor), but Nita decides to return to India in 2003 to live with her parents, who can provide for Anish better than she can. Robbie goes with her and Anish to live in Mumbai, and he leaves Wellard in the care of his friend, Gus Smith (Mohammed George).

Robbie returns briefly for Sonia and Martin Fowler's (James Alexandrou) wedding in 2004.

He returns again for Bianca's wedding to Ricky Butcher (Sid Owen) in February 2010, and is upset to hear that Wellard has died. When asked about Nita he reveals that she cannot attend the wedding as she is six months pregnant. Robbie walks Bianca down the aisle on her wedding day and returns to India after the wedding. When Robbie's half brother Billie suddenly dies several months later, Robbie, Nita and Sonia are unable to attend his funeral due to the flight costs, their newborn baby, Sami Jackson, and the fact that Sonia is visiting Robbie and Nita in Mumbai.

In September 2015, Robbie returns with his son Sami, surprising Carol. He reveals that he and Nita have split up and he is moving to Milton Keynes and offers Carol the chance to move with him there. Although she agrees, she later decides that she wants an adventure and plans to travel the world on Jim's motorbike, but not before buying Robbie and Sami a puppy, Wellard II, for their move to Milton Keynes.

=== 2017–2019 ===
In June 2017, Carmel Kazemi (Bonnie Langford) decides to just work part-time as the market inspector. Robbie arrives at the café and reveals to the market traders that he is the new market inspector. Robbie runs a training session for the market traders, but they end up walking out. Martin (now James Bye), Kush Kazemi (Davood Ghadami) and Donna Yates (Lisa Hammond) become increasingly irritated by Robbie's way of running the Market, so much that Kush and Martin throw him into a bin as a prank. Robbie then removes Donna's stall from her pitch, giving it to a young hipster named Felix Moore (George Maguire) until she can pay her fees, however, after a talk from Sonia, Robbie decides to change his tactics and give Donna her pitch back, earning him thanks from Donna and Martin. However Mr Lister (Nick Wilton) orders Robbie to reinstate Felix, demanding modernisation of the market by Christmas. When the deadline is up, Mr Lister is unimpressed, but organises for an independent visitor to shop at the market as a shopper without the date announced. Mr Lister is not happy when Felix quits his stall due to a breakage and Robbie did not make the person responsible pay and Robbie decides to quit his job as it saves the council money. Robbie starts a relationship with Donna after being set up by Whitney Carter (Shona McGarty). However, Robbie and Donna later split. After visiting Nita and Sami in Mumbai, Robbie returns with his son. He ignores phone calls and messages from Nita, so she returns to Walford to collect Sami. Robbie barricades himself and Sami inside his flat and Nita threatens to call the police, but Sonia persuades her not to. Robbie then unlocks the door and returns Sami to Nita. After saying goodbye, they leave again. Several months later, Robbie receives a call from Nita who tells him Sami has been injured in an accident and he leaves to join them.

== Reception ==
In 2009, Robbie Jackson came sixth in a poll by British men's magazine Loaded for 'Top Soap Bloke'.

In 2020, Sara Wallis and Ian Hyland from The Daily Mirror placed Robbie 80th on their ranked list of the best EastEnders characters of all time, calling him a "Hapless romantic roadsweep" who was a "bit of a joke in Walford", but called his "devotion" to Wellard "a joyful thing".
