= St Mark's Catholic School, Hounslow =

St Mark's Catholic School
- Logo of the school

Location
- 106 Bath Road; Hounslow, Greater London, TW3 3EJ; England; 51°28′06″N 0°22′28″W

Information
- Type: Academy
- Religious affiliation: Roman Catholic
- Established: 1961
- Department for Education URN: 137995 Tables
- Ofsted: Reports
- Headteacher: Andrea Waugh-Lucas
- Gender: Coeducational
- Age: 11 to 18
- Enrolment: 1207
- Houses: Becket, Campion, Clitherow, Fisher, More, Pole
- Website: www.st-marks.hounslow.sch.uk

St Mark's Catholic School is a co-educational Catholic secondary school and sixth form with academy status, having formerly been a voluntary aided school, situated in Hounslow, West London, England. St Mark’s is part of the Archdiocese of Westminster.

== History ==
In 1936, Father Wilfred Musgrave, Parish Priest of Ss Michael and Martin's Church, suggested that a mixed Catholic secondary school should be built in Hounslow. His plan was suspended by the outbreak of the Second World War, but in 1952, a site was purchased at 106 Bath Road with a house, land, and an orchard.

Musgrave died in 1955 and the project was transferred to his successor, Canon John Mackenzie. Building work commenced in 1958, funded by donations from local Catholics.

The school, initially called Archbishop Myers Secondary, received its first 279 pupils on 10 May 1960, welcomed by Headteacher Patrick Boland and 11 staff. The builders remained until April 1961 and the school was officially opened in March 1962.

In 1972, the school became a voluntary aided school and changed its name to St Mark's. The uniform changed from maroon to navy blue. Originally six forms of entry were planned with a split site – a senior school located at the other end of Hounslow High Street. These plans were dropped and in 1978 the buildings of the old Ss Michael and Martin's Primary School were included in the enlarged St Mark's site. The original parish church, dating from 1886, became a Sixth Form Common Room.

Patrick Boland retired in 1978 and was replaced by Patrick Topp. St Mark's contained 800 pupils and 50 teachers. Topp was succeeded by David Sheath in 1986. By the time of Sheath's retirement the School was recognised as one of the best in the London area. Paul Enright took over in 2001, and was succeeded in 2018 by Andrea Waugh-Lucas. As of October 2023, the school had around 1,400 students.

A fire took place in the school on 31 October 2023.Four fire engines arrived to fight the blaze. The fire was first reported to the London Fire Brigade at 09:04 AM and was under control by 10:52 AM. No injuries were reported.

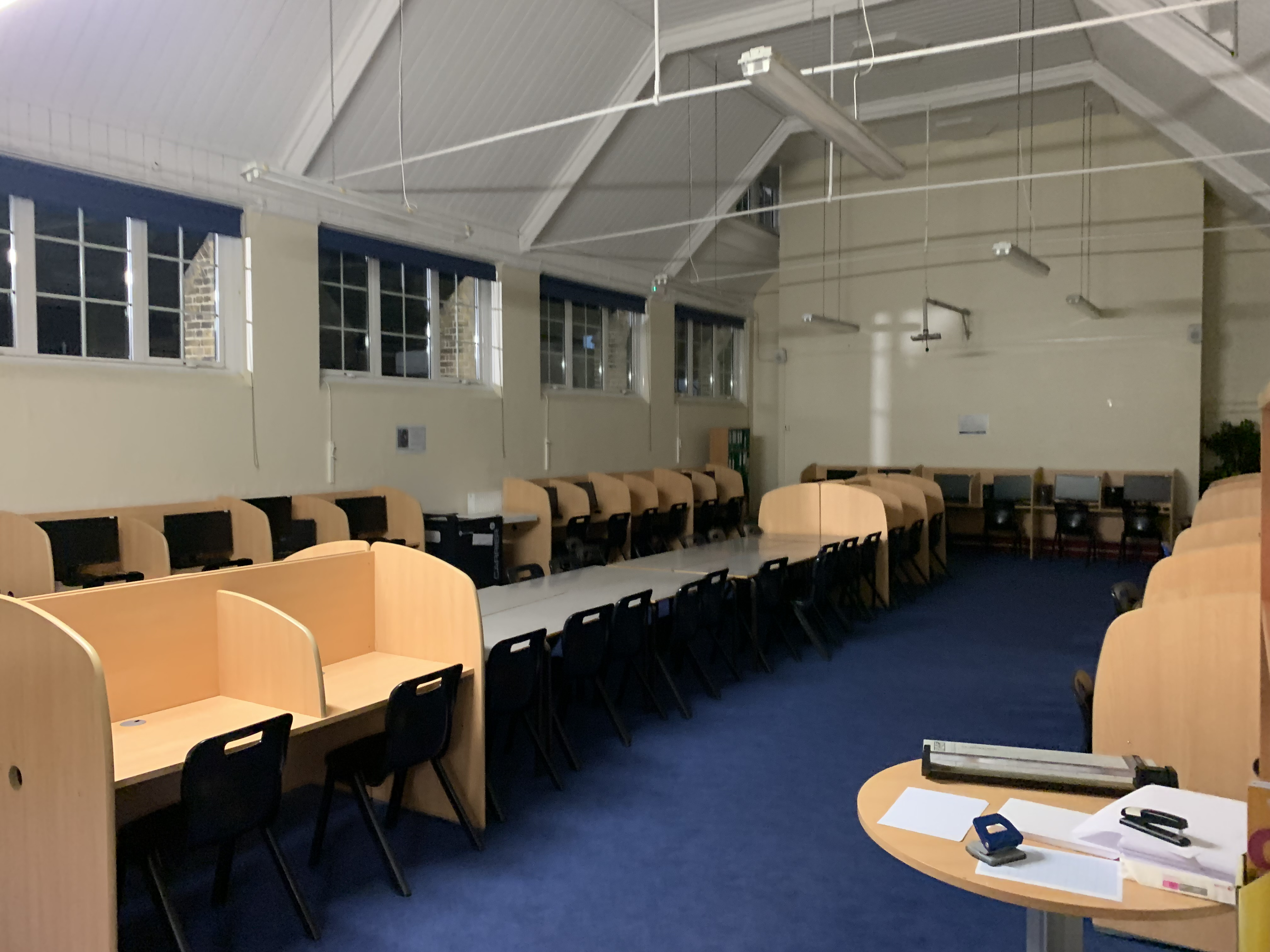
The Sixth Form Common Room

== Notable former pupils ==
- Elvis Costello (b. 1954) – songwriter and musician.
- Denys Baptiste (b. 1969) – award-winning saxophonist.
- Tim Don (b. 1978) – World Triathlon Champion and Olympian.
- Dean Gaffney (b. 1978) – actor
- Graham Stack (b. 1981) – professional footballer, Arsenal F.C.
- Rajiv Ouseph (b. 1986) – badminton player
- Michael Mancienne (b. 1988) – professional footballer, New England Revolution
- Dennis Gyamfi (b. 2001) – professional footballer, FC Den Bosch
- Lewis Richards (b. 2001) - professional footballer, Bradford City
