= Bindya Solanki =

British actress

Bindya Solanki (born 24 May 1974) is a British actress.

== Biography ==
Solanki comes from Southend-on-Sea, the seaside town in Essex. Her parents are of Gujarati descent and emigrated to England in the 1960s. She attended Brunel University and graduated in 1995 with a BA (hons) degree in drama.

She made her television debut in the ITV children's programme My Parents Are Aliens in 1999, playing a teacher. She went on to have roles in the BBC drama Sweet Revenge and she also played Nima Shah in Sky One's Dream Team in 2001.

She is best known for playing the role of Nita Mistry in the popular BBC soap opera EastEnders (2001–2003, 2019). Solanki's character was introduced as a love interest to Dean Gaffney's character, Robbie Jackson. She remained in the role for two years, but was axed along with Gaffney in 2003. In a press report executive-producer Louise Berridge commented "Dean and Bindya have contributed an enormous amount to the programme ... However, we feel that the characters have reached the end of their natural course in the show, and they will both be leaving in Spring 2003 ... It is always sad to be saying goodbye to a good double act, so we will be leaving the door open for both characters". Nita made a return for one episode in 2019.

Solanki has also appeared in many stage productions including playing Juliet in Romeo and Juliet at the English Shakespeare Company. In 2004 she played Pramila in RIFCO Arts The Deranged Marriage and in 2006 she played Frehia in Mercy Fine.

In 2005, she guest starred in the Doctor Who Sixth Doctor audio drama The Juggernauts, returning to Doctor Who audios again in 2009 in the Seventh Doctor audio drama Enemy of the Daleks.

Solanki appeared in BBC Asian Network's Silver Street, playing the character Mindy.

From 2012 onwards, Solanki took a step back from acting has worked in new business development for London-based companies.

She continues to carry out voice over work for radio and volunteers as an Ambassador at Diversity Role Models.

== Filmography ==
Television and film
Year	Title	Role	Notes
1999	My Parents are Aliens	Teacher	1 episode
2001	Sweet Revenge	Asha	1 episode
2001-2003, 2019	EastEnders	Nita Mistry	76 episodes
2008	Criminal Justice	Magistrates Clerk	1 episode
2011	Doctors	Parvati Majithia	1 episode
