= Dean Gaffney =

English actor

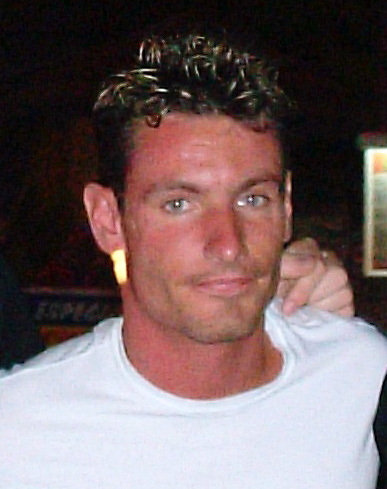
- Gaffney in 2004
- Born: 14 February 1978 (age 48); Hammersmith, London, England
- Occupation: Actor
- Years active: 1991–present
- Children: 2

Dean Martin Gaffney (born 14 February 1978) is an English actor, best known for his role as Robbie Jackson on the BBC soap opera EastEnders from 1993 to 2004 and 2017 to 2019; he also made guest appearances in 2004, 2010 and 2015. In 2006, he competed in the sixth series of ITV show I'm a Celebrity...Get Me Out of Here! and finished in fifth place.

== Early life ==
Gaffney was born in Hammersmith, London. He attended St Mark's Catholic School, Hounslow, and later trained at the Sylvia Young Theatre School in Marylebone, and the Corona Theatre School in Kew Bridge.

== Career ==
=== EastEnders ===
Gaffney's first appearance as Robbie Jackson in EastEnders aired in December 1993, and he remained in the role for 11 years. In 2003, executive producer Louise Berridge made the decision to axe Gaffney along with the actress Bindya Solanki, who played his on-screen girlfriend Nita Mistry. In a press report, Berridge commented, "We do feel that the characters have reached the end of their natural course in the show, and they will both be leaving in spring 2003". Gaffney made a further appearance in the soap, returning for a brief visit in 2004 for the wedding of his on-screen half-sister Sonia Jackson (portrayed by Natalie Cassidy).

On 25 October 2009, it was announced Gaffney would briefly reprise his role as Jackson. In June 2015, it was announced Gaffney would once again briefly reprise his role as part of Lindsey Coulson's (who played his mother on the show) departure from the show. On 17 April 2017, it was announced he would return to the soap full-time. Gaffney was written out of the soap in 2019 amid concerns over his behaviour off-set.

=== Other roles ===
In 1991, Gaffney played the Boy (alternating with another actor) in Samuel Beckett's Waiting for Godot in the West End, alongside Rik Mayall and Adrian Edmondson.

In November 2006, Gaffney appeared as a guest star on the long-running ITV serial drama The Bill. Gaffney played Gavin Josef, a cocky wide-boy who was connected to an assault investigation. In 2007, Gaffney toured with the Agatha Christie Theatre Company, performing The Unexpected Guest. He played Jan, a 19-year-old murder suspect with learning difficulties. During Christmas 2011, he appeared in pantomime at the Thurrock Thameside Theatre in Grays, Essex.

In 2015, Gaffney starred as Wishee Washee, in the pantomime Aladdin, staged at The Brindley in Runcorn.

In November 2022, Gaffney appeared in a charity football match in Chatham, Kent.

In 2023, he appeared in I'm a Celebrity... South Africa.

== Personal life ==
Gaffney lives in Hertford, Hertfordshire. He and Sarah Burge are the parents of twin daughters, Charlotte and Chloe. Gaffney and Burge were in a relationship for 22 years and were engaged. While appearing on I'm a Celebrity...Get Me Out of Here!, Gaffney admitted to David Gest that he had had an affair. The couple split in 2015.

In January 2013, Gaffney suffered serious head injuries when a car he was travelling in collided with the central reservation on the A38 in Derby. Gaffney admitted he had not been wearing his seat belt at the time of the accident, and said "It could have been a lot worse. One inch down and I would have been blind. One inch up and I would have been brain damaged." In 2019, Gaffney was involved in two further car crashes, the first, on the M25 in Essex, the second, four months later, outside Elstree Studios.

In 2022, Gaffney broke his collarbone after being hit by a Lamborghini driven by Wesley Fofana whilst on a night out in London. He is a fan of Brentford F.C.

== Filmography ==
Television and film
Year	Title	Role	Notes
1993	The Bill	Paul Moore	1 episode
1993	Inside Victor Lewis-Smith	Stage Kid	1 episode
1993	Oasis	Mickey Drake	
1993–2004, 2010, 2015, 2017–2019	EastEnders	Robbie Jackson	978 episodes
2003	The Club	Himself	
2003	Rain in Hell		Short film
2006	The Bill	Gavin Josef	Guest appearance
2006	I'm a Celebrity...Get Me Out of Here!	Himself	Contestant
2007	Extras	Himself	
2009	M.I. High	Luke Withers	1 episode: "The Mole"
2012	Crime Stories	Mark Hall	1 episode
2013	Let's Dance for Comic Relief	Himself	Charity appearance
2013	Misfits	Mick	
2020	Celebs Go Dating	Himself	Main cast
2023	I'm a Celebrity... South Africa	Himself	
2025	Reckless	Wilmot	

== Stage ==
Year	Title	Role
1991	Waiting for Godot	The Boy
2007	The Unexpected Guest	Jan
2010	Calendar Girls	
2013	A Murder is Announced	Patrick Simmons
2013	Murder in Play	Simon Brett
2014	Peter Pan	Captain Hook
2015	Aladdin	Wishee Washee
