= Terry Raymond =

Fictional character from the BBC soap opera EastEnders

- EastEnders character
- Portrayed by: Gavin Richards
- Duration: 1996–2002
- First appearance: Episode 1359; 21 October 1996
- Last appearance: Episode 2268; 8 March 2002
- Introduced by: Jane Harris
In-universe information
- Occupation: Shopkeeper
- Wife: Louise Raymond (until 1998); Irene Hills (1999–present)
- Sons: Simon Raymond
- Daughters: Tiffany Mitchell
- Stepsons: Tony Hills
- Stepdaughters: Sarah Hills
- Granddaughters: Courtney Mitchell

Terry Raymond is a fictional character from the BBC soap opera EastEnders, played by Gavin Richards. Terry is initially introduced briefly in 1996 as the drunken father of Tiffany (Martine McCutcheon) and Simon Raymond (Andrew Lynford). He is reintroduced as a full-time character in 1997 and remains in the serial until 2002, when actor Gavin Richards decided to leave.

== Development ==
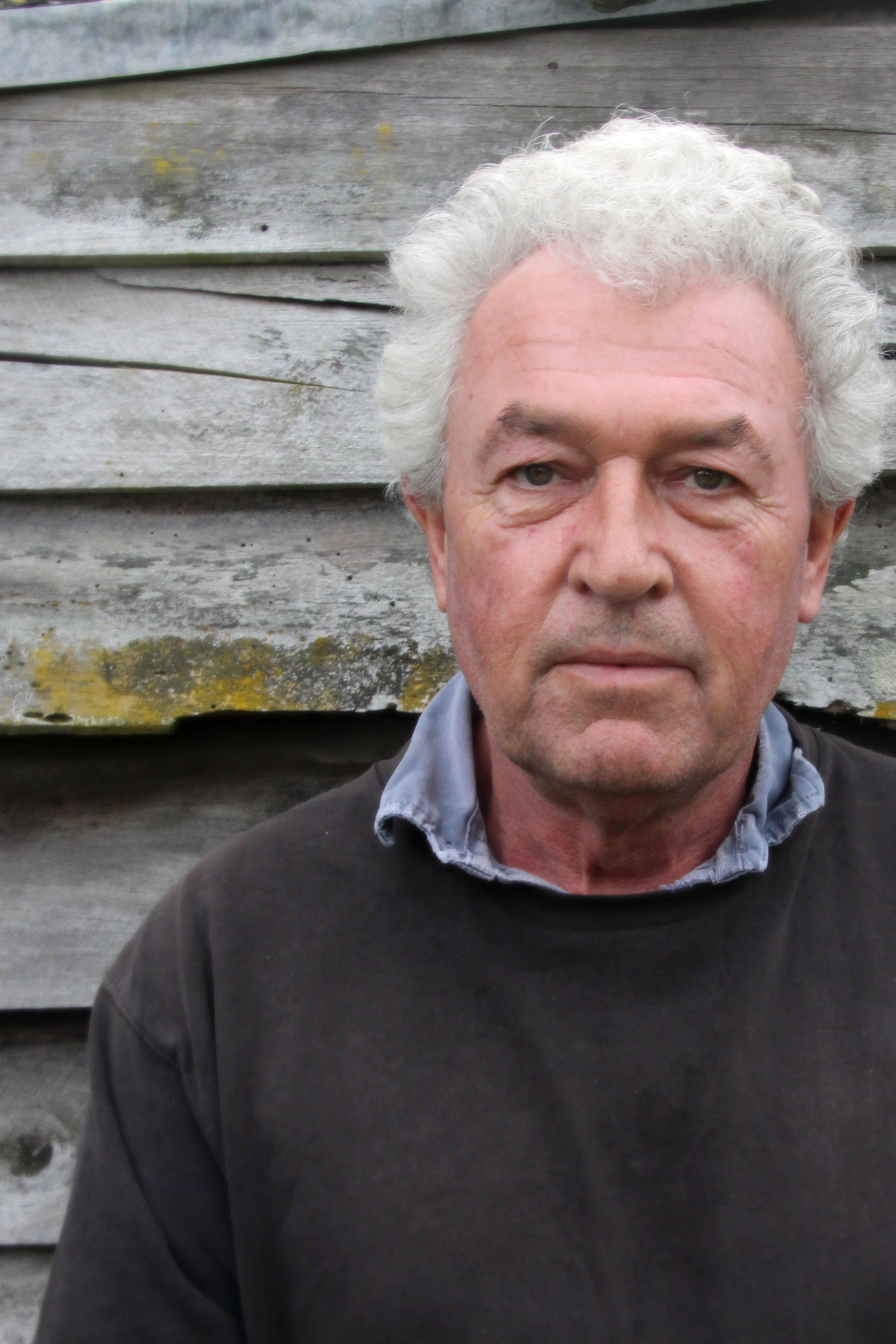
Gavin Richards (pictured) portrayed Terry.

In 2001, Susan George was cast as Margaret Walker, a new love interest for Terry. Although sources prior to filming suggested that Margaret would be a sophisticated conwoman, this was never actually confirmed on-screen. The ending of the storyline was left ambiguous, as although the man at Margaret's flat turns out to be her brother after all, he does not appear to be dying, as Margaret had said.

It was announced that Gavin Richards quit the role in November 2001. A source reportedly told the press that Richards had been unhappy in the role since the exit of his on-screen wife Irene (Roberta Taylor), as he felt that he had "not been given enough juicy storylines." Terry was not killed off in the soap; he departed in 2002 in search of his estranged wife.

== Storylines ==
Terry arrives in Albert Square in October 1996, looking for his children, Tiffany and Simon Raymond (Martine McCutcheon and Andrew Lynford). Terry was once a successful estate agent, but lost his fortune when the housing market collapsed in the 1980s. He began drinking heavily and his behaviour towards his family became abusive and violent. His marriage to Tiffany and Simon's mother deteriorated. Eventually she left him and her children. Prior to his arrival, Terry tries writing to his children, telling them that his alcohol abuse has resulted in him being hospitalised with pancreatitis. Tiffany is unsympathetic and refuses to see him. Terry's alcoholism and abusive behaviour meant his children had severed their ties with him long before his arrival. In the past, he had beaten Simon and had pushed Tiffany down the stairs when she was pregnant by her teacher, causing her to miscarry, so neither are happy to see Terry on his arrival in Walford. Terry is furious to discover that his daughter is pregnant and disgusted to find out that his son is gay. After much rowing, Tiffany's boyfriend, Grant Mitchell (Ross Kemp), frightens him away. Terry continues to drink heavily and is warned by doctors that if he doesn't stop, he will soon be dead. He decides to make another attempt at a reconciliation with his children and returns to Walford in August 1997; arriving on the day Tiffany and Grant are having their marriage blessed. After getting completely drunk, and making a scene, Terry is sent packing once again.

Later in the year, Terry is re-admitted to hospital. Fearing that he is dying, Tiffany relents and visits him. Before they know it, Tiffany and Simon are in charge of Terry's recovery and he persuades Tiffany to let him to stay in Walford with her, much to Grant's anger. Here, he begins a romance with fellow divorcée Irene Hills (Roberta Taylor), whom he had flirted with on his previous visit. Terry soon moves in with Irene and her children, making things difficult for Simon, who is dating Irene's son, Tony Hills (Mark Homer). In 1998, Terry and Irene plan to marry but the ceremony is interrupted when Terry's wife, Louise (Carol Harrison), gate-crashes it, declaring that she and Terry are still married. Terry had been refusing to divorce Louise as he didn't want to give her half his assets in the settlement. Irene is furious but Terry wins her round and they go on their honeymoon anyway, just not as man and wife. Later, Terry buys the local grocery store, 'The First Til Last', from Neelam Kapoor (Jamila Massey) and runs it with Irene. However, Terry's early spell as owner is beset with problems, particularly the sale of adult magazines, which provokes the ire of the community.

Terry and Irene remain happy for a while. Terry gives up alcohol and even manages to patch things up with his children. However, Terry is devastated when Tiffany is killed whilst trying to reclaim her daughter from Grant. Terry blames Grant for her death and hates him for his maltreatment of her whilst she was alive. However, he has to control his rage if he wants access to his granddaughter, Courtney. Terry eventually does divorce Louise and goes on to marry Irene at a registry office in January 1999. However, married life doesn't prove to be plain sailing, with Terry often squandering the business' profits on mundane ventures and gambling and Irene soon tires of Terry's incapability to understand her. Around this time, Troy Harvey (Jamie Jarvis), a college friend of Tony's, lodges at the Raymonds'. Troy has a penchant for older women and it isn't long before he and Irene begin an affair. Terry finds out on Christmas Day 1999 and throws Troy out, leaving Irene to think Troy had left of his own accord. He forgives Irene, but she is never really satisfied in their marriage after her dalliance with Troy. In 2000, Terry takes Irene on holiday to Spain but her unhappiness is only magnified away from Walford and Terry gives her an ultimatum; she can return to Walford and grow old with him or leave right there and then. Irene chooses the latter and leaves Terry to return to Walford a broken man.

Terry recovers, and starts a letting agency with Janine Butcher (Charlie Brooks). When Janine's father Frank (Mike Reid) flees Walford, Terry takes her in and the two form an unlikely allegiance. Terry begins to view Janine as a surrogate daughter, and Janine uses this to exploit money and attention from him, even purposefully dressing in a similar fashion to his dead daughter, Tiffany. Terry, meanwhile, seems oblivious to her scheme. In 2001, Terry begins a relationship with one of his tenants, Margaret Walker (Susan George). Devious Janine doesn't like the fact that Terry's attention is diverted from her and she does everything she can to ruin their relationship. Margaret is not perturbed and vows to beat Janine at her own game, leading to numerous squabbles. When Janine discovers a photo of Margaret and another man, she immediately assumes the worst and informs Terry that Margaret is cheating on him. Margaret explains that the man in the photo was her brother, David (Michael Fenner) who is dying of cancer, and she is paying for his placement in a drug trial in America. The relationship continues to develop despite Janine's interference, and Janine becomes incensed when she discovers that Margaret is planning to propose to Terry. Shortly after, Janine witnesses Margaret kissing her supposed brother, and when she discovers that Terry is intending to give Margaret £10,000, she tells him that Margaret is conning him and informs him about the kiss she'd witnessed. Terry is only too quick to believe Janine's skewed version of the truth and finishes with Margaret, though the man at Margaret's flat turns out to be her brother after all.

When Terry grows tired of Janine's manipulation, she decides to change tactics and makes an attempt to seduce him. Terry eventually succumbs to Janine's advances, but whilst kissing her he catches a glimpse of disgust on her face and finally understands that she is using him. Furious, Terry throws her out onto the street. Soon after, Terry decides that he's had enough of Walford and in 2002 he decides to leave in search of his wife Irene, who is supposedly still travelling around Portugal.

== Reception ==
Tim Randall from the Daily Record suggested in 2001 that Terry and Irene's double-act was "EastEnders at its best", but that the relationship between Terry and Janine was "enough to turn your stomach".
