= Gavin Richards =

British actor

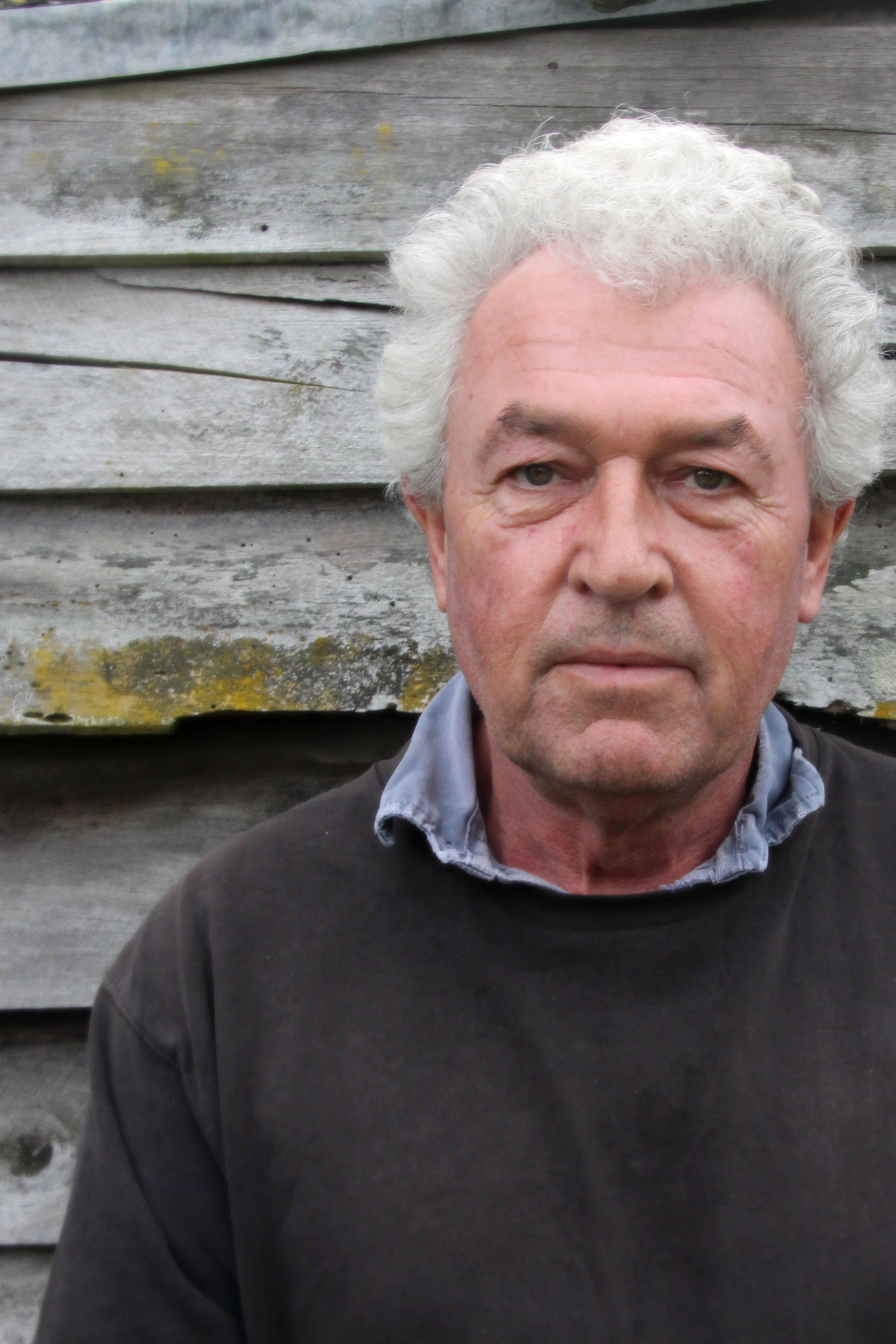
- Richards in May 2014
- Born: 3 July 1946 (age 80); London, England
- Education: Bristol Old Vic Theatre School
- Occupation: Actor
- Years active: 1966–2015
- Spouse: Tamara Henry
- Children: 3

Gavin Richards (born 3 July 1946) is an English actor, writer and director. He is best known for playing Captain Alberto Bertorelli in the BBC sitcom 'Allo 'Allo! from 1987 to 1989 and Terry Raymond in the BBC soap opera EastEnders between 1996 and 2002.

== Early life ==
Gavin Richards was born in Tufnell Park, north London. His mother was Margaret Richards, who worked for many years as an assistant to Hugh "Binkie" Beaumont, the British theatrical producer at H M Tennent Limited. She went on to become secretary to Roy Strong at the Victoria & Albert Museum and later worked for the Greater London Arts Association. His father was music critic Denby Richards, who wrote for the Hampstead and Highgate Express, the early British version of Music and Musicians and later became emeritus editor of Britain's oldest classical music magazine, Musical Opinion.

Richards attended the Burleigh Road School in Tufnell Park and later the Quintin Grammar School in St John's Wood (now the Quintin Kynaston Community Academy). He trained at the Bristol Old Vic Theatre School from 1964 to 1966.

He began his professional career with five years in repertory theatres in Leicester, Manchester, Bolton and Liverpool.

== Career ==
Richards has worked as an actor, director and writer in theatre, television and film for more than forty years. He is most familiar for his portrayal of Terry Raymond in the BBC TV series EastEnders, appearing in more than 300 episodes. He also played Captain Alberto Bertorelli in the TV comedy 'Allo 'Allo! in which he appears in more than thirty episodes. His television credits also include roles in Coronation Street, Hi-de-Hi! as general manager Maplins holiday camp boss Harold Fox, who was known to the staff as The Smiling Viper, The Bill, Lovejoy, Minder, Inspector Morse, A Touch of Frost, Between the Lines and Pie in the Sky. He co starred with Robert Powell in Hannay, with Leigh Lawson in Kinsey, Michael Kitchen in The Reporters and with Rowan Atkinson in Full Throttle. He also starred in the series Annie's Bar, Driving Ambition, Hardwicke House, Mike & Angelo and many other programmes. He has appeared in films, amongst others, with Robin Williams in Being Human, with Oliver Reed and Glenda Jackson in Michael Apted's Triple Echo, and in the New Zealand film Savage Play.

As a director and actor in the theatre, Richards is also known for adapting the work of Dario Fo into the English language in his own West End hit production of Accidental Death of an Anarchist (Wyndham's Theatre, 1980) for which he was nominated for an Olivier Award. He also starred in the production for Channel 4 TV in the UK. Richards played Face in Griff Rhys Jones's production of The Alchemist at the Lyric Theatre, Hammersmith and toured in the lead role in Jack Shepard's Comic Cuts. He worked as a guest artist on the BBC/SPP TV co production of Kidnapped, and the TVNZ production of The Lost Children, both shot entirely in New Zealand. Richards has performed at the London Palladium in the stage production of 'Allo 'Allo, which also toured New Zealand and Australia.

He directed Shane Connaughton's first play, Jenny at the Roundhouse, London, in 1969. In the 1970s he performed throughout Europe and Scandinavia with Ken Campbell's Roadshow, before becoming a founder member of the 7:84 Theatre Company and artistic director of the Belt & Braces Theatre Company, touring Britain for more than twelve years in political rock musicals. Belt & Braces also produced Brecht's Mother Courage. As well as his own work, Richards' collaborations with writers John Arden, Margaretta D'Arcy, Adrian Mitchell, Trevor Griffiths and John McGrath were seen regularly at the Edinburgh Festival and transferred to London on several occasions.

Richards's political activism was illustrated when he appeared in separately distributed media (mainly VHS tapes) titled "The Miners’ Campaign Tapes" made by independent filmmakers which were sponsored by the NUM. The tapes gave an alternative view of the UK miners' strike (1984–85) to those presented by the mainstream media at the time.

In 1987 he played "Brian" in the British Gas Public Information Film about the dangers of a gas leak. In the early 1990s, together with Tamara Henry, Richards presented Richard Sparks's comedy The Crimson Lizard in New Zealand, with himself, Annie Whittle and Lloyd Scott, at the Court Theatre, Christchurch and the Fortune Theatre, Dunedin. The production was then remounted in the UK at the West Yorkshire Playhouse, Leeds.

Richards and Henry then went on to form their own theatre company, Theatre South, which toured a New Zealand version of The Drawer Boy, by Michael Healey, to audiences at the Fortune Theatre in Dunedin, the Court Theatre in Christchurch, Centrepoint Theatre in Palmerston North and at Downstage in Wellington. The production also played in Blenheim, Invercargill, Whangārei, Tauranga and Hamilton. Theatre South is the only professional theatre company in Marlborough. Past productions include a schools' workshop production, The Hole in the Sky, and Tittle Tattle 1 & 2 by Emmerdale script writer Lesley Clare O'Neill (December 2005 and October 2006).

Theatre South also produced War Child, written and directed by Richards. Dedicated to War Child Australia, part of the international relief and development agency working for the rehabilitation of child soldiers, the show featured a cast of 9- to 18-year-olds from Marlborough, plus a full professional crew, and was received enthusiastically by audiences over its eight-day run, winning a local community award.

Richards has also appeared as Patrick in Tony McCaffrey's (A Different Light Company) production of The Night Season by Rebecca Lenkiewicz, at the University Theatre, Christchurch and as Claudius in both Hamlet and Rosencranz & Guildenstern for the Court Theatre, Christchurch, in April 2006. In 2007 he appeared as Creon in Tolis Papazoglou's production of Antigone, at Studio 77 in Wellington.

In 2008, Theatre South produced Peter Quilter's Glorious! and Chris Bond's version of Dracula.

In 2009 he was diagnosed with myasthenia gravis and following an extended period of illness, began work on a book of poetry entitled 200 Weeks published by Muswell Press in January 2015.

== Filmography ==
=== Television ===
Year	Title	Role
1967	Love Story	Jack
1972	Play for Today ("The Reporters")	Des
1978	Z-Cars	Major Philpot
1982	Oi for England	The Man
1983	Accidental Death of an Anarchist	Maniac
1984	Driving Ambition	Ken Lark
1985	Titus Andronicus	Lucius
1984–1986	Hi-de-Hi!	Harold Fox
1986	Ladies in Charge	Cosmo Keble
1986	Call Me Mister	Miller
1986–1987	C.A.T.S. Eyes	Maitland / Quist
1987	Yesterday's Dreams	Mr. Fisher
1987	Hardwicke House	Dick Flashman / Mr. Flashman
1987	Bust	Alan Hardy
1987–1989	'Allo 'Allo!	Captain Alberto Bertorelli
1988–1989	Hannay	Count Otto Von Schwabing
1991	T-Bag and the Rings of Olympus	Count Von Fledermause
1993	Inspector Morse	Steven Trevors
1989–1993	Mike & Angelo	Brett Douglas
1993	Minder	Vic
1994	A Touch of Frost	Les Wingham
1994	Coronation Street	Alex Christie
1993–1994	Between the Lines	Det. Supt. Tyler
1994	Lovejoy	Oliver Jeffries
1995	Full Throttle	W.O Bentley
1995	Pie in the Sky	Fisher's Assistant
1992–1995	The Bill	Ken Mackie / Det. Supt. Wells / Terry Ford
1996	Annie's Bar	Nick Buckley
1996	The Upper Hand	Charlie Bennett
1997	Soldier Soldier	Al Springer
1997	The Locksmith	Max Parker
1998	The Prince of Hearts	Chief Superintendent
1996–2002	EastEnders	Terry Raymond
2005	Kidnapped	Captain Hoseason

=== Film ===
Year	Title	Role
1972	Triple Echo	Stan
1982	Crystal Gazing	Neil Holt
1988	Whoops Apocalypse	Donald
1994	Being Human	Da Cunha
1995	Savage Play	Kim

== Published works ==
- Accidental Death of an Anarchist (Dario Fo, Gavin Richards, Gillian Hanna), 1973
- Weight (with David Bradford), 1973
- England Expects, 1977
- Die Kinder (based on a screenplay by Paula Milne), 1993
- 200 Weeks, 2015
