= List of EastEnders characters introduced in 2003 =

EastEnders logo

The following is a list of characters that first appeared in the BBC soap opera EastEnders in 2003, by order of first appearance.

== Dominic Price ==
DI Dominic Price
- EastEnders character
- Portrayed by: Paul Brennen
- Duration: 2003–2005
- First appearance: Episode 2479; 10 March 2003
- Last appearance: Episode 2867; 6 January 2005
In-universe information
- Occupation: Detective

Detective Inspector Dominic Price, played by Paul Brennen, is first seen in March 2003, while his colleague, PC Kate Morton (Jill Halfpenny) is undercover as a honeytrap on Phil Mitchell (Steve McFadden), investigating the disappearance of Lisa Fowler (Lucy Benjamin), mother of Phil's daughter Louise Mitchell (Rachel Cox).

He mainly helps Kate with initial searches of the Mitchell house, constantly reminding her that "the boss" wants to nail Phil. He later starts to suspect that Kate is developing feelings for Phil, and reminds her that Phil could be a murderer. Kate gives Phil an ultimatum: to tell the truth about Lisa's whereabouts or she will finish with him. After Phil calls her bluff and finishes with her, Price takes Kate off the case, however, after Phil phones her and says he will tell her everything, she is congratulated by "the boss" – DCI Jill Marsden (Sophie Stanton) – who has wanted to convict Phil since 2001.

Kate goes to the Mitchell's house wearing a wire, and hears Phil's confession that he had mentally abused Lisa into handing over Louise, leaving her in Portugal. After this, Kate takes off her wire, telling Price and Marsden that she has fallen in love with Phil. They stick around outside, hoping that Kate has changed tactic and is still on their side, but they cannot hear what is happening as the wire has broken, so Marsden calls Kate's mobile phone, which leads to Phil discovering the wire. After a heated argument, Price and Marsden storm into the house to find Phil with his hand around Kate's throat. She refuses to press charges so they cannot arrest him, and they have to leave, deflated.

Price appears again in May 2003 when Kate returns to work and is asked to choose between her job and Phil. She chooses to resign, and asks Price for one last favour as a leaving present: to get George Peters (Andy Beckwith) arrested for dealing cocaine. George is a heavy employed by Jack Dalton (Hywel Bennett), who had been sent to rape Kate.

Price and Marsden later appear in November 2003, when Den Watts (Leslie Grantham) and his son Dennis Rickman (Nigel Harman) set Phil up for armed robbery; this time they are successful in convicting him, keeping him in custody until his case collapses in 2005. In late 2004, an off-duty Price visits Kate, now running a salon, and she tells him she is bored of her career. He finds her another job in the police, based in Brighton, which causes her to leave Walford the next day.

== Dennis Rickman ==
Dennis Rickman, played by Nigel Harman, is introduced as the hardman successor to the character of Steve Owen (Martin Kemp), who was killed off in the series in 2002. Dennis makes his first appearance on 14 April 2003. His storylines involve his difficult past and childhood, relationship with his infamous father, Den Watts (Leslie Grantham), clashes with the rival Mitchell family, and a forbidden romance with his adopted sister, Sharon Watts (Letitia Dean). He is described as the show's "bad boy pin-up character." In 2005, Harman quit the show alongside co-star Dean, and makes his last appearance on 30 December 2005.

== Mickey Miller ==
Mickey Miller, played by Joe Swash, makes his first appearance on 15 April 2003. Introduced as a guest character, Mickey proved popular and was turned into a regular by executive producer Louise Berridge. The character is portrayed as a wheeler-dealer, involved in various money-making scams. A family is built around the character in 2004 when the other Millers move to Albert Square. It was announced on 25 February 2008 that the characters of Mickey and his stepfather Keith (David Spinx) had been axed by EastEnders' executive producer Diederick Santer. Mickey leaves on 1 July 2008. In July 2011, it was announced Swash would reprise his role for the departure storyline of his screen brother Darren (Charlie G. Hawkins). He appears for two episodes on 19 and 20 September 2011. In 2024 Mickey Returned To Albert Square For a Storyline Involving Mo Harris.

== Shirley Benson ==
Shirley Benson
- EastEnders character
- Portrayed by: Robyn Moore
- Duration: 2003–2004
- First appearance: Episode 2511; 5 May 2003
- Last appearance: Episode 2679; 17 February 2004
- Created by: Louise Berridge
In-universe information
- Occupation: Betting shop clerk
- Husband: Colin (backstory)

Shirley Benson is played by Robyn Moore. The character was axed in 2004.

Shirley is initially seen in Albert Square in May 2003. A divorcée, she has three sons, now grown up; two are in the army and the other lives in New Zealand. She works at the Walford Bookies and lives with her cat, Boots, at 89a George Street. Shirley asks if Vicki Fowler (Scarlett Alice Johnson) is old enough to gamble and her half-brother Dennis Rickman (Nigel Harman) vouches for her. However, several weeks later, Vicki and Dennis' half-sister Sharon Watts (Letitia Dean) reveals that Vicki is underage and threatens to report Shirley, much to her shock.

Dan Ferreira (Dalip Tahil) needs a date for an upcoming wedding, so he asks Shirley and she agrees. Dan tells Shirley that his wife, Pushpa (Madhur Jaffrey), is dead, when they have only separated, following Pushpa's infidelity. At the wedding, everyone is enjoying the day until Pushpa introduces herself to Shirley. She is mortified to discover Dan's lies, telling him that her ex-husband was a liar and she is not prepared to put up with lying again. She also tells Dan that she wants nothing more to do with him.

In August that year, Shirley has problems with her new neighbour, Gavin Sharp (Steve Nicolson). He lives in the flat above hers and plays extremely loud music at all hours, meaning Shirley cannot sleep. She tries reasoning with him several times but he laughs at her, only playing his music louder, so she complains to the council. Maddened, Gavin threatens to make her life a misery as payback. Days later, Shirley's cat disappears and Shirley fears that Gavin is responsible. Whilst Dan confronts Gavin about Boots, Little Mo (Kacey Ainsworth) walks into The Queen Victoria pub, cuddling Boots. Shirley rewards her with money but later that day, Shirley finds Boots on her doorstep – dead in a plastic bin bag. Shirley turns to the Ferreiras for help, and Dan confronts Gavin again. Gavin denies killing Boots and says that he found her lying dead in the road and left her on Shirley's doorstep so she could bury her. Shirley, however, is not convinced. Gavin's taunting continues when he puts her telephone number on a card, advertising her as a prostitute, and distributes it across Walford. Later, while she is at work, Gavin breaks into her flat and tips rotten rubbish all over the floor. Shirley is distraught, and seeing her angst, Ash Ferreira (Raji James), decides to help. He plays Gavin at his own game, borrowing his brother's amplifier and speakers and playing dance music extremely loudly. He then breaks into Gavin's flat and lets a rat loose. Gavin is petrified of rats and when he discovers it, he agrees to call a truce if they remove it.

The saga brings Ash and Shirley closer together and it is not long before they start a relationship. Ash wants to keep it a secret because he knows his father will be furious if he finds out. Shirley begins to get irritated with Ash's inability to tell Dan, particularly when Dan tries to woo Shirley for a second time. Ash explains that he had been a compulsive gambler, and Dan had bailed him out of serious financial difficulties after he lost his house and his wife. He owes his father everything and is unwilling to hurt him. However, when Dan tries kissing Shirley she told him that she is with his son, Ash. This revelation causes huge rows at the Ferreiras' and although Ash loves Shirley, he feels he has no choice but to finish with her to keep the peace.

In February 2004, Andy Hunter (Michael Higgs) takes over the bookies where Shirley works. Shirley does not like the way Andy runs things and after she complains repeatedly about his conduct, Andy fires her. Shirley demonstrates about her unfair dismissal with a placard outside the bookies. Eventually Andy offers her a large sum of money to leave. Shirley is thrilled with the pay-off and decides to go to New Zealand to visit her son.

== Jack Dalton ==
Jack Dalton
- EastEnders character
- Portrayed by: Hywel Bennett
- First appearance: Episode 2515; 12 May 2003
- Last appearance: Episode 2554; 18 July 2003
- Introduced by: Louise Berridge
In-universe information
- Occupation: Gangster; Nightclub manager
- Mother: Doreen Dalton

Jack Dalton, played by Hywel Bennett, is a gangland boss and the leader of the criminal organisation known as "The Firm". He first appears in EastEnders in May 2003, although the events surrounding the apparent death of the character Den Watts (Leslie Grantham), who was supposedly murdered in February 1989 were then retconned to include him. Dalton was a fearsome and legendary kingpin of the Walford criminal underworld. In addition to this and his status as head of The Firm, Dalton was responsible for ordering Den's death 14 years earlier.

In the late 1980s, Den became involved with "Walford Investments", aka The Firm, and was forced to become the titular manager of Strokes wine bar (formerly Henry's), which was owned by The Firm and was really a front for illegal gambling. Strokes had a rival bar in the form of The Dagmar, fronted by James Willmott-Brown (William Boyde), who went on to rape his employee Kathy Beale (Gillian Taylforth) – the wife of Den's best friend Pete (Peter Dean). In response to this, Den used his connections with The Firm to arrange for The Dagmar to be torched. The fire drew attention to the illegal goings-on at Strokes, and thus greatly angered The Firm. Den refused to take the blame and The Firm believed that he had informed the police about them.

Consequently, Dalton decided to have Den murdered, and two of their members followed him to Manchester in September 1988 when he went there to seek refuge with a friend. However, he managed to outrun them in his friend's car and handed himself into the police; Den was then held under remand in custody on an arson charge until he appeared in court the following February.

In one of the series' most famous exits, Den – who just hours earlier had escaped after members of The Firm had intercepted the taxi taking him to court – was shot as he walked by the canal by a member of The Firm, who was walking with a woman and had a gun hidden in a bunch of daffodils. Three weeks later, spots of blood were found on the canal towpath and the police identified this as Den's blood, and believed that he had been murdered. However, an initial search of the canal failed to uncover his body.

In April 1990, Billy (Danny Brown), a local boy was fishing in the canal when he discovered Den's distinctive signet ring, prompting another search of the canal, which this time uncovered a body which was identified as Den's.

In 2003, it is revealed that Den had indeed been shot, but the shot had only wounded him. Aided by his mistress Jan Hammond (Jane How), he was able to escape to Spain where he forged a new life. Den finally returns to Walford on 29 September 2003. The body which had been found, wrongly-identified and buried had actually been the body of the unseen Mr. Vinnicombe, who was said to have been Dalton's predecessor as head of the Firm during the 1980s.

Dalton had been displeased with Vinnicombe's failure to murder Den, and so ordered a member of The Firm to kill him and dump his body in the canal at the location where Den had been shot – his teeth were then bricked out to prevent dental identification; this implied a power struggle for control of "The Firm" at the time between Dalton and Vinnicombe. He also dumped Den's distinctive ring in the canal to further increase the likelihood of the body being identified as that of Den. Upon Vinnicombe's demise, Dalton was able to gain firm control of the organisation.

During his brief spell on screen, Dalton shows a Machiavellian and ruthless streak. This is first evident when he first appears onscreen at his nightclub, the Imperial Room, and receives a visit from Phil Mitchell (Steve McFadden) – the local hardman of Albert Square, a community from East London and its fictionalised borough: Walford. Following Phil's visit, Dalton arranges for one of his neighbours Spencer Moon (Christopher Parker) to get beaten up for using forged currency in his club though Spencer's brother Alfie (Shane Richie) takes the beating by pretending to be Spencer.

Later, Dalton discovers that his personal secretary Kate Morton (Jill Halfpenny) is actually a policewoman working undercover at his nightclub. In response, he summons his bouncer George Peters (Andy Beckwith) with the task of killing Kate by raping and murdering her in the latter's house. This is nearly successful, until Phil, who previously had a romantic relationship with Kate, comes to her rescue by knocking out Peters. The two men later return to Dalton, who blames Peters for failure and confronts Phil over his relationship with Kate. Though he is eventually persuaded by Phil to let Kate live scot-free, Dalton tells Phil that he now owes him a favor.

Dalton subsequently receives a visit from Phil's love rival, Dennis Rickman (Nigel Harman). It soon transpires that Dennis is Dalton's most dedicated employee, having been taken under Dalton's wing since he was 16-years-old. Moreover, Dennis had recently served 18 months in prison for covering up Dalton's criminal activities without exposing his involvement. Dennis soon begins to blackmail Dalton for £20,000 in compensation for serving his prison sentence for him. After giving Dennis his £20,000 compensation, Dalton plans to have him killed and summons Phil to carry out the task by reminding him of the favor he owes him. When Phil goes to kill Dennis, however, he ends up changing his mind when Dennis offers to kill Dalton himself, so the two of them will be free of him. Using the gun that Dalton originally gave Phil to kill him, Dennis confronts Dalton at his nightclub and forces him to drive Phil's car into the woods, where Dalton is ordered to park on the edge of a railway track.

Dalton is initially unfazed by Dennis's attempt to kill him, and attempts to brainwash Dennis in teaming up against Phil, with Dalton going as far as to recount all the things they have done together. When Dennis mentions Den and his family, pointing out that his future with Den's adopted daughter Sharon (Letitia Dean) is what matters to him now, Dalton begins to badmouth Sharon and her family, before admitting to have arranged for Den to be killed.

However, Dalton's mood changes from composure to fear when Dennis makes a confession: that Sharon's father is actually his father as well. Confirming that Den is his father, Dennis continues to point the gun at Dalton, who desperately attempts to reason with Dennis by revealing the truth about Den Watts: that he is in fact alive. Dalton begs Dennis that this "has to make a difference" in the hope that he will not shoot him, but Dennis tells him that it does not and, before Dalton can react, proceeds to shoot him, killing Dalton.

Dalton appears to be somewhat nihilistic. When Dennis tells Dalton that he wants a new life away from a life of crime, Dalton responds nonchalantly, echoing Dot Branning's (June Brown) words when she is depressed: "There isn't any new life! Just the old humdrum life bobbing along, making a living, getting old, waiting to die."

Dalton's death would later be avenged at the end of 2005, when Dennis is murdered by Danny Moon (Jake Maskall) on the orders of his crime boss Johnny Allen (Billy Murray), who himself had killed Dalton's representative Andy Hunter (Michael Higgs) nearly a year before; ironically, Andy died on the same night Den was ultimately killed by his wife Chrissie (Tracy-Ann Oberman). Dalton's legacy ultimately ends with Phil and his younger brother Grant (Ross Kemp) seeking to avenge Dennis' murder on Sharon's behalf, which culminates in Danny getting killed by his brother Jake (Joel Beckett), while Johnny later dies of a heart attack after being imprisoned for the murders of both Andy and Dennis respectively.

== Dan Ferreira ==
Dan Ferreira, played by Dalip Tahil, is the head of the Ferreira family, and father to Ash (Raji James), Adi (Ameet Chana), Ronny (Ray Panthaki) and Kareena (Pooja Shah). When he first arrives in Albert Square, he claims to be a widower, talking about his wife, Pushpa (Madhur Jaffrey) as being dead, both to the neighbours and his children, but they have merely separated after she had an affair. Dan disappears suddenly and clears out the family's bank account, and it is later revealed that Tariq Larousi (Nabil Elouahabi) is his illegitimate son.

== Ash Ferreira ==
Ash Ferreira, played by Raji James, is the eldest son of Dan (Dalip Tahil) and brother of Adi (Ameet Chana), Ronny (Ray Panthaki) and Kareena (Pooja Shah). He is the intelligent member of the family, the standard of his education being much higher than his siblings, so much so that he is a lecturer. He has an on/off problem with gambling. He has a relationship with Shirley Benson (Robyn Moore), but it ends when his father finds out.

== Adi Ferreira ==
Adi Ferreira, played by Ameet Chana, is the brother of Ash (Raji James), Ronny (Ray Panthaki) and Kareena (Pooja Shah). Adi runs a clothes stall on the market with his sister, and spends a lot of time trying to impress his father, Dan (Dalip Tahil) but fails. He has a romance with Sasha Perkins (Jemma Walker), a pole dancer and escort, who he initially pays to pretend to be his girlfriend. However she has an affair with Danny Moon (Jake Maskall) which ends the relationship.

== Ronny Ferreira ==
Ronny Ferreira, played by Ray Panthaki, is the brother of Ash (Raji James), Adi (Ameet Chana) and Kareena (Pooja Shah). Ronny is a DJ, and has brief relationships with Kelly Taylor (Brooke Kinsella) and Zoe Slater (Michelle Ryan). He is stabbed by a gang while trying to protect his friend Tariq Larousi (Nabil Elouahabi), and needs to have a kidney transplant. When none of his family are a tissue match, Tariq reveals that he is Ronny's half-brother, and he donates a kidney to him.

== Kareena Ferreira ==
Kareena Ferreira, played by Pooja Shah, is the daughter of Dan Ferreira (Dalip Tahil) and sister of Ash (Raji James), Adi (Ameet Chana) and Ronny (Ray Panthaki). Kareena is in a secret relationship with Tariq Larousi (Nabil Elouahabi), though it is not a sexual one. This is not discovered by the Ferreira family until after they break up. It later transpires that Tariq is Kareena's half-brother. She has a relationship with Mickey Miller (Joe Swash), but problems arise when Juley Smith (Joseph Kpobie) gives Kareena cocaine and she is seduced by him.

== Tariq Larousi ==
Tariq Larousi, played by Nabil Elouahabi, is a friend of Ronny Ferreira (Ray Panthaki), and is disliked by Ronny's father, Dan Ferreira (Dalip Tahil). It transpires that Tariq is in a secret relationship with Ronny's sister Kareena Ferreira (Pooja Shah), but the Ferreira family discover this after they split up. Ronny is stabbed by a gang while trying to protect Tariq, and needs to have a kidney transplant. When none of his family are a tissue match, Tariq reveals that he is Dan's son, and therefore Ronny's half-brother. Tariq then donates a kidney to him.

== Pushpa Ferreira ==
Pushpa Ferreira, played by Madhur Jaffrey, is the mother of Ash (Ameet Chana), Adi (Ameet Chana), Ronny (Ray Panthaki) and Kareena (Pooja Shah). She is separated from her husband Dan Ferreira| (Dalip Tahil) after she had an affair with his best friend, with whom she moved in with. Dan claims to Shirley Benson (Robyn Moore) that Pushpa is dead, but his lie is uncovered when she arrives at a wedding and introduces herself to Shirley.

== Tony Jamison ==
Tony Jamison
- EastEnders character
- Portrayed by: Ben Cartwright
- First appearance: Episode 2544; 1 July 2003
- Last appearance: Episode 2604; 14 October 2003
In-universe information
- Occupation: Habitual offender

Tony Jamison, played by Ben Cartwright, is the ex-partner-in-crime of Dennis Rickman (Nigel Harman), and used to work with Dennis for their gangland boss Jack Dalton (Hywel Bennett) – which led to Dennis serving an 18-month prison sentence for Dalton.

A broke Tony visits Dennis in 2003 asking for £20,000. He persuades Dennis to ask Dalton for a loan on his behalf. Dennis succeeds in getting the loan, but this provokes Dalton to order Dennis' love rival, Phil Mitchell (Steve McFadden), to kill him at the "Angie's Den" nightclub. However, Dennis persuades Phil to let him kill Dalton – which he does in a nearby forest. Three months later in October, Dennis meets up with Tony in a Greek Cafe to discuss a business proposition, but he does not reveal what it is. Dennis says all he needs is no more than £2000, but is dismayed when Tony tells him that all the money has gone; due to paying off "debt collectors, the lot". Tony has not been seen or heard from after this.

== Andy Hunter ==
Andy Hunter, played by Michael Higgs, is a mobster who originally as representative of The Firm – though he later takes control of the organization following the murder of its leader and his gangland boss, Jack Dalton (Hywel Bennett). From then onwards, Andy becomes the show's main antagonist up until his departure from the series on 18 February 2005. He has a relationship with local resident Kat Slater (Jessie Wallace), but she leaves him at their wedding ceremony to be with his love rival – Alfie Moon (Shane Richie). He later goes on to marry Kat's best-friend Sam Mitchell (Kim Medcalf). She ends up signing her house and assets over to Andy and he then dumps her afterwards, leaving Sam with nothing. Andy also orders the murder of Alfie's neighbour Paul Trueman (Gary Beadle), after Paul – who had been working for Andy – reported him to the police for his criminal activities. Andy's luck finally runs out, however, when he tries to con fellow mob boss Johnny Allen (Billy Murray) – who consequently usurps Andy from his position as the crime kingpin of Walford. After Johnny learns of his plan to defraud him, he forges a meet-up between him and Andy at a motorway flyover. There, Johnny kills Andy by forcing him off the bridge – causing Andy to fall to his death.

Ironically, Andy died on the same night that his frenemy Den Watts (Leslie Grantham) is murdered by his wife Chrissie (Tracy-Ann Oberman). Soon afterwards, Andy's death is discovered by his friend and Dalton's killer Dennis Rickman (Nigel Harman) – which prompts Johnny to have him assassinated by his employee Danny Moon (Jake Maskall). Eventually, Andy's death is avenged when Sam's brothers Phil (Steve McFadden) and Grant (Ross Kemp) resolve to help their lover Sharon (Letitia Dean) bring Johnny to justice for Dennis' murder – as she and Dennis were married and adopted half-siblings; this culminates with Danny being shot dead by his brother Jake (Joel Beckett), while Johnny later dies of a heart attack amid serving life imprisonment for the murders of Andy and Dennis respectively.

== Sasha Perkins ==
Sasha Perkins
- EastEnders character
- Portrayed by: Jemma Walker
- Duration: 2003–2005
- First appearance: Episode 2548; 8 July 2003
- Last appearance: Episode 2909; 22 March 2005
- Introduced by: Louise Berridge
In-universe information
- Occupation: Cab firm manager

Sasha Perkins is played by Jemma Walker.

She is initially shown as Adi Ferreira's (Ameet Chana) escort friend in 2003, whom he hires to pretend to be his girlfriend at a wedding to impress his father, Dan (Dalip Tahil). Originally a guest character, executive producer Louise Berridge opted to bring her back the following year, offering actress Jemma Walker a 6-month contract. Walker commented in 2004, "I think she's a bit of light relief around the place [...] Sasha called herself an 'escort', but I think she was actually on the game. But she doesn't have any issues with it. You do what you have to do to survive." Sasha was reportedly brought in to spice up the Asian Ferreira family, who were heavily criticised in the British media.

Sasha begins a relationship with Adi and moves in with him, bringing her pet snake called Lionel. Walker has commented, "Adi's shy and hasn't had much experience with the ladies. Sasha's had enough [bastards] mess her around and now she wants someone to settle down with."

Sasha joins the Ferreira family mini-cab firm; they name the company Toucan Cars after her toucan slippers. She eventually realises that Adi is not right for her; she has an affair with Danny Moon (Jake Maskall) and then ends the relationship. Following this, she has sex with Billy Mitchell (Perry Fenwick) before leaving Walford. The character was one of many to be axed by executive producer Kathleen Hutchison following a media backlash and falling ratings surrounding the soap.

== Nurse Lennon ==
Nurse Lennon
- EastEnders character
- Portrayed by: Dystin Johnson
- Duration: 2003–2004, 2006, 2018–2019, 2022
- First appearance: Episode 2557; 24 July 2003
- Last appearance: Episode 6429; 4 February 2022
In-universe information
- Occupation: Nurse

Nurse Lennon, portrayed by Dystin Johnson was a nurse, who was also a midwife that appeared on a recurring basis over the span of 19 years intermittently. Lennon was credited as "midwife" in 2003 and 2004, and as "nurse" in 2006. She first appears in Episodes airing 24–25 July 2003, when she helps Laura Beale (Hannah Waterman) deliver her baby son Bobby. She returns the following year, on 29 October 2004 when she helps Demi Miller (Shana Swash) deliver her daughter, Aleesha Miller (Freya and Phoebe Coltman-West). Her next appearance was on 6 April 2006, when she took an ultrasound of Janet Mitchell for Honey Edwards (Emma Barton) and her fiancé, Billy Mitchell (Perry Fenwick).

After nearly 12 years absence, Lennon returned on 16 January 2018 when Abi Branning (Lorna Fitzgerald) is diagnosed with brainstem death which her father, Max Branning (Jake Wood), struggles to accept and will not allow her life support to be withdrawn. When he distracts Nurse Lennon, Max barricades himself in Abi's room and refuses to comply. When the police are called, Nurse Lennon speaks to Max via mobile, telling him that her 18-year-old son Ryan died caused by drink driving, but her son was dead when she last saw him. She tells Max to say goodbye and he relents. She returned again on 24 September 2019 when Chantelle Atkins (Jessica Plummer) has cut her hand on broken glass. Lennon noticed bruises on her arms, which causes her to ask questions. As a result, she gives Chantelle, who was being domestically abused by her husband, Gray Atkins (Toby-Alexander Smith) a lip balm that has the phone number of a domestic abuse hotline. Her next appearance was Christmas 2019, when Lee Carter (Danny-Boy Hatchard) brought his mother, Linda Carter (Kellie Bright) to hospital after she had passed out from heavy alcohol consumption and signs of hypothermia. Lennon's most recent appearance was on 4 February 2022 when she was caring for Jordan Atkins, the son of Chelsea Atkins (Zaraah Abrahams) and Gray, whom she had recently married. Lennon remembered Gray from their last encounter and warns Chelsea about domestic abuse, which he interrupts.

== Bobby Beale ==
Bobby Beale is played by Clay Milner Russell. Bobby is the son of Ian and Laura Beale (Adam Woodyatt and Hannah Waterman). Kevin Curran played Bobby from 2003 to 2007, and was replaced by Alex Francis on 7 May 2007. Francis was not credited in the role until 10 March 2008. In January 2013 it was announced that Bobby had been recast, with Rory Stroud taking over the role. Stroud first appeared as Bobby on 1 March 2013. His character departed from the show in May, before returning in November, with Eliot Carrington taking over the role.

== Jonathan Leroy ==
Jonathan Leroy
- EastEnders character
- Portrayed by: Ivan Kaye
- Duration: 2003–2005
- First appearance: Episode 2573; 21 August 2003
- Last appearance: Episode 2945; 23 May 2005
In-universe information
- Occupation: Doctor
- Wife: Mrs Leroy

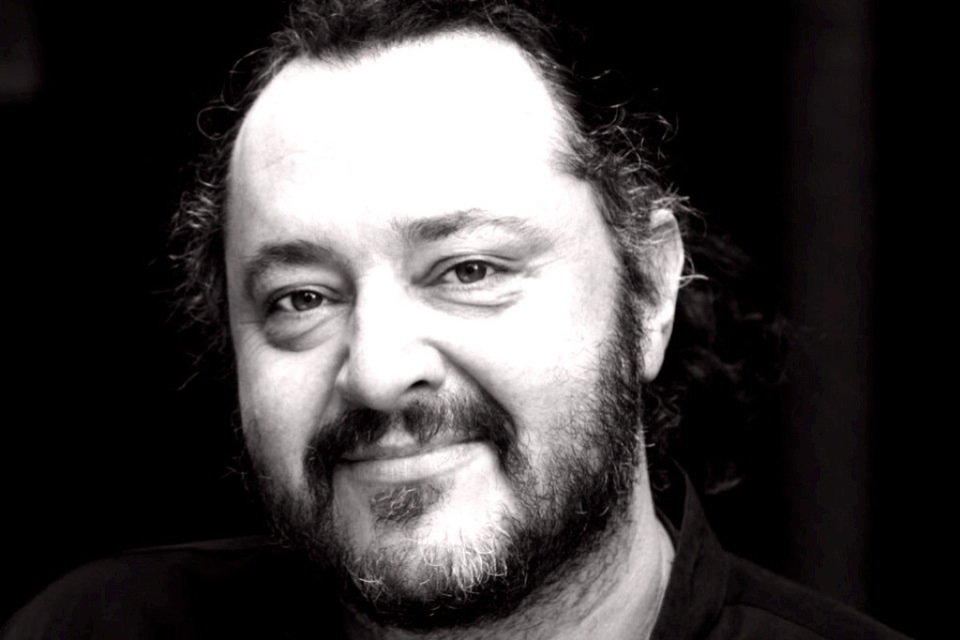
Ivan Kaye portrayed the character across his two-year stint.

Doctor Jonathan Leroy, played by Ivan Kaye, is first seen with his unnamed wife as Phil Mitchell's (Steve McFadden) unwelcome tenants that have been fraudulently renting Phil's house by his nanny Joanne Ryan (Tara Lynne O'Neill), as an act of revenge for him spurning her advances.

Dr. Leroy continues as a recurrent character in the role of new doctor for Albert Square until he is replaced by Oliver Cousins (Tom Ellis). His wife is not seen after her first appearance in 2003. Leroy is also a member of the Queen Vic's ill-fated pub football team, Real Walford.

== Gavin Sharp ==
Gavin Sharp
- EastEnders character
- Portrayed by: Steve Nicolson
- First appearance: Episode 2574; 22 August 2003
- Last appearance: Episode 2614; 31 October 2003
In-universe information
- Occupation: Video shop worker

Gavin Sharp, played by Steve Nicolson, is Shirley Benson's (Robyn Moore) nuisance neighbour. He is first seen in Walford in August 2003 when he moves into 89b George street, which is the flat above Shirley's. He works in the Walford video shop.

As soon as he moves in, Gavin starts causing problems for Shirley, by playing his music extremely loudly at all hours of the day and night. After a while, Shirley pleads with him to stop being so inconsiderate, but this only makes him play his music louder. Eventually, Shirley reports him to the landlord, and then to council. After Gavin is visited from a council representative, he vows to make Shirley's life a misery. Days later, Shirley's cat, Boots, goes missing, and she fears that Gavin may be responsible. After several weeks, the cat is found dead in a plastic bin bag on Shirley's doorstep. A distraught Shirley turns to her friends, the Ferreira family, for help, but Gavin claims that he found the cat dead in the road and returned it to Shirley as an act of kindness. Shirley is not convinced.

Gavin continues to make Shirley's life hell by putting her telephone number on a call-girl card and posting them around Walford. He later breaks into her flat and tips rubbish all over her floor. Ash Ferreira (Raji James) decides to step in and play him at his own game. He borrows his brother's speakers and plays dance music extremely loudly, which maddens Gavin and he reports them to the landlord. Shirley and Ash are ready for this, and upon the landlord's visit, they play classical music and pretended they are involved in a book club. This satisfies the landlord and leaves Gavin looking like a fool. He threatens both Shirley and Ash, and makes regular racist comments whenever any of the Ferreiras are around. A few days later, Ash overhears an altercation between Gavin and the road sweeper Gus Smith (Mohammed George). Gavin is unhappy about the uncleanliness of the Square, particularly as it could attract rats. Sensing Gavin's fear of rats, Ash and family convince Gus to trap a rat in the Square, and with the help of Tariq Larousi (Nabil Elouahabi), he breaks into Gavin's flat and sets the rat free. The plan works and Gavin is petrified. He promises to call a truce with Shirley if they remove the rat.

However, Gavin decides to perform one last malicious act as payback. He sabotages the Ferreiras clothing stock with paint. When the Ferreiras attempt to reclaim for the damages on their insurance, they are furious to learn that Adi (Ameet Chana) had forgotten to renew it. Gavin's last appearance is in October 2003.

== Yolande Trueman ==
Yolande Trueman, played by Angela Wynter, arrives in Albert Square as Patrick Trueman's (Rudolph Walker) holiday romance. They eventually settle down and marry in 2004. She strikes up a feud with Pat Evans (Pam St Clement), which worsens when she discovers that Pat has been having an affair with Patrick. In 2008 Yolande is offered a new job at the Minute Mart HQ in Birmingham. She accepts with delight and busily prepares for the move, however Patrick is less keen. This leads to Yolande surprising everyone at her leaving party by announcing that she is leaving Walford alone. She returned for one episode on 20 March 2017.

== Graham Foster ==
Graham Foster
- EastEnders character
- Portrayed by: Alex McSweeney
- Duration: 2003–2005, 2023
- First appearance: Episode 2619; 10 November 2003
- Last appearance: Episode 6781; 2 October 2023
- Introduced by: Louise Berridge (2003); Chris Clenshaw (2023)
In-universe information
- Occupation: Used car salesman
- Mother: Deirdre Foster
- Sons: Freddie Slater
- Daughters: Rebecca Foster; Ella Foster

Graham Foster, played by Alex McSweeney, first appears as a customer in The Queen Victoria public house and befriends barmaid Little Mo Mitchell (Kacey Ainsworth). They become friends after discovering they both love crosswords and Graham gives Little Mo a pen to use when she does them. He also buys her a rose when a flower salesman is in the pub. In July 2023, it was announced by the Daily Mirror that McSweeney would be reprising his role as Graham. His return involves a storyline that sees Freddie Slater (Bobby Brazier) learn who his real father is, a story that McSweeney was excited to be part of and thought was important to tell. His return scenes aired on 2 August 2023.

One night in the pub when he and Little Mo are alone, Graham refuses to leave until "Love Is All Around", which is playing on the jukebox, ends; Little Mo does not know he has put the song on repeat. Graham eventually makes his intentions towards Little Mo clear by trying to kiss her. She tries to flee, but Graham chases her and rapes her on the pub floor. This results in her conceiving their son, Freddie.

Little Mo's father, Charlie Slater (Derek Martin) subsequently assaults Graham, resulting in three months imprisonment and a suspension of his taxi license. Graham then sues Charlie for compensation, which is paid by Little Mo's sister Kat Moon (Jessie Wallace) and her husband, Alfie (Shane Richie). They offer and Graham accepts £10,000, which they have borrowed from Andy Hunter (Michael Higgs). Graham boasts about spending the money until Kat warns him he will need it for protection, explaining what prison is like for men like him.

On 5 November 2004, Graham appears before the Crown. After Little Mo gives her summary of events and her husband Billy (Perry Fenwick) defends her in his testimony, the court takes a recess. It is during this that Graham's mother Deirdre (Patricia Brake) approaches Little Mo and Freddie and reveals that Graham has two daughters, Ella and Rebecca, from his failed marriage, who he never sees. When Little Mo witnesses Graham verbally abusing Deirdre, she feels sorry for her, while explaining that it reminds her of how her late ex husband Trevor Morgan (Alex Ferns) spoke to her. Once back in the courtroom, Graham lies under oath, claiming that he sees his other children often, only for Little Mo's barrister to reveal it has been over three years since he last saw them. Graham gets into a rage from the dock, shouting at his mother and knowing that she has informed Little Mo of this. He is found guilty and sentenced to eight years in prison. Little Mo gives Deirdre her address and asks her to remain in contact.

Graham last appears in January 2005, when Billy goes to visit him in prison after receiving a visiting order, which he requested. Graham taunts Billy about not being Freddie's real father and points out Freddie has siblings, two sisters. He tells Billy that Freddie will probably look like him, and he is looking forward to seeing him when he is released in four years time.

Eighteen years later, Freddie's cousin Tommy Moon (Sonny Kendall), overhears his mother Kat talking about Graham Foster and tells Freddie, now 18, to search for him online, which he does. Freddie finds Graham's name and learns that he works at a used car dealership in Peckham. Bobby Beale (Clay Milner Russell) helps set up a meeting in the square between the two under the pretext of buying one of his used cars. Graham and Freddie meet in the square and Freddie admits he lied to get Graham there and as Graham leaves, Freddie reveals that he is his son and begins asking questions. Graham then takes Freddie on a test drive. Kat, Alfie and Billy look for Freddie after learning that he has been in touch with Graham and find him. The three of them try to explain about Graham's past, but Freddie refuses to listen until they tell him the truth about Little Mo's rape. Devastated, Freddie severs all ties with Graham and cuts him out of his life.

In October 2023, Freddie receives a friend request from Graham, he immediately blocks him, but later decides to confront him after Anna Knight (Molly Rainford) tells him that Graham should at least admit his wrongdoings. Freddie and Anna arrive at the used car dealership where Graham works. Freddie confronts Graham over raping Little Mo and demands he apologise. Graham refuses, showing no remorse for what he has done and orders Freddie to leave, threatening to call the police for harassment if he doesn't. Freddie reluctantly leaves with Anna. Later on, Graham deletes a picture on his phone of him and Freddie bonding, seemingly cutting Freddie out of his life.

== Edwin Caldecott ==
Edwin Caldecott
- EastEnders character
- Portrayed by: Ron Moody
- First appearance: Episode 2635; 8 December 2003
- Last appearance: Episode 2641; 18 December 2003
In-universe information
- Occupation: Retired

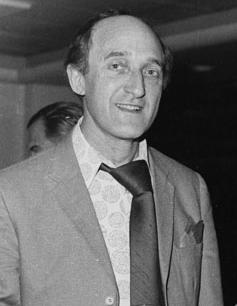
Actor Ron Moody (pictured in 1975) portrayed Edwin.

Edwin Caldecott, played by Ron Moody, is a nemesis of Jim Branning (John Bardon), from his days as a boxer. Edwin goads Jim into one final match, which his wife Dot Branning (June Brown) and granddaughter Sonia Jackson (Natalie Cassidy) advise him against. On the day of the match, Jim is geared up to fight Edwin, but when Dot appears at the community centre, Jim is distracted and Edwin takes the advantage to get first the punch in, knocking Jim flat. Dot decides to let Jim think he won afterwards.

In 2017, Inside Soap said that Edwin's storyline was "a bit of light-hearted fun in the drama-packed run up to EastEnders' Christmas" and said it was "nice" to see Moody in action.

== Others ==
Character	Date(s)	Actor	Circumstances
Joel	1 January – 28 February (6 episodes)	Scott Adkins	A barman at Angie's Den, employed by Sam Mitchell (Kim Medcalf), when he takes his top off and she sees his torso. He is attracted to Vicki Fowler (Scarlett Johnson).
Malcolm	7 – 16 January (2 episodes)	Peter McMichael	Anthony Trueman's (Nicholas Bailey) practice partner and manager, whose company Kat Slater (Jessie Wallace) finds boring.
Teresa	7 – 16 January (2 episodes)	Monica Gibb	Anthony Trueman's (Nicholas Bailey) practice partner and manager, whose company Kat Slater (Jessie Wallace) finds boring.
Mike Parker	13 January	Bill Ward	Mike is from the brewery who gave Alfie Moon an award for the East End Pub of the year award and Jimmy is photographer from the Walford Gazette.
Jimmy Metcalf	13 January	Uncredited	Mike is from the brewery who gave Alfie Moon an award for the East End Pub of the year award and Jimmy is photographer from the Walford Gazette.
Ben	3–18 March (5 episodes)	Neil McDermott	Replacement market cleaner for Robbie Jackson (Dean Gaffney) while he is on holiday. He annoys the locals and they put glue on his broom.
Mr. Hendry	6 March-13 July (6 episodes)	Joseph Long	The new manager of the Minute Mart who takes over after Nita Mistry (Bindya Solanki) left. Gus Smith (Mohammed George) took over the till but was later dismissed for accidentally switching all the freezers off, which ruined the stock.
Amy	7 March	Melissa Pryer	A woman had a one-night stand with Paul Trueman (Gary Beadle), which resulted in Eleanor Trueman (Charnae Leckie). Amy finds where Paul lives and leaves Eleanor in a basket on his front doorstep, with a note saying she's sorry.
Eleanor Trueman	7 March-25 April	Charnae Leckie	The daughter of Paul Trueman (Gary Beadle) and a woman called Amy (Melissa Pryer), who was the result of a one-night stand. Amy leaves the baby on Paul's doorstep and he struggles to cope as a single parent. He names the baby Eleanor, after the mother of his stepfather, Patrick Trueman (Rudolph Walker). As Paul starts to cope with looking after Eleanor, Amy decides she wants her back, and Social Services collect her, leaving Paul heartbroken.
DS Wilson	21 April 2003-2 January 2006 (7 episodes)	Heather Bleasdale	
Carl Bromley	8 May–19 May (5 episodes)	Joe Rice	Owner of a chain of car lots who approaches Barry Evans (Shaun Williamson) with a proposition to buy into Evans and Son. Barry refuses, but Janine (Charlie Brooks) later meets up with Bromley, and forges a deal. When she discovers that Bromley is double-crossing her and Barry, she terminates the deal.
Vanessa Bird	22 May	Sara Houghton	Gus Smith's (Mohammed George) lawyer when he is wrongly arrested for a robbery at The Minute Mart. He had been trying to stop Martin (James Alexandrou) and Vicki Fowler (Scarlett Johnson) from robbing the shop, and got arrested after they ran away. The charges are dropped against Gus after Dennis Rickman (Nigel Harman) frames two other men.
DS Marsh	22 May – 28 November; 20 January 2011 (8 episodes)	Steve Money	A Detective Sergeant first seen in May 2003 when Gus Smith (Mohammed George) is wrongly arrested for robbing The Minute Mart. Marsh questions Gus and urges him to name the real culprits, who are Martin (James Alexandrou) and Vicki Fowler (Scarlett Johnson) who fled the scene . In 2011, he investigates an attack on Connor Stanley (Arinze Kene), interviewing Ricky Butcher (Sid Owen), Whitney Dean (Shona McGarty), Max Branning (Jake Wood) and Connor.
George Peters	22 May–30 May (3 episodes)	Andy Beckwith	A bouncer who works for his gangland boss Jack Dalton (Hywel Bennett) at his nightclub: the Imperial Room. Peters is sent by Dalton to rape and murder his sectary Kate Morton (Jill Halfpenny), after Dalton discovers that she is an undercover policewoman. However, Kate's lover Phil Mitchell (Steve McFadden) comes to her rescue by punching Peters – whom Dalton subsequently blames for his failure. Kate later gets him arrested for dealing crack cocaine to schoolchildren.
Nobby Stuart	26 June	Antony Booth	A tramp who gives Alfie Moon (Shane Richie) a condom, needed for seducing Kat Slater (Jessie Wallace). He first appears when Alfie walks into the Midnight Mission at the local church hall for a cup of tea, after being beaten up. He sits with Nobby and talks about Kat ("Kathleen") and not being good at relationships. Nobby talks to Alfie about his love for women over the years, including his late wife Mary of 26 years. After mentioning why he left Kat, Nobby gives Alfie the condom he needs, and wishes him good luck. Alfie later drops it in the river.
Pradeep	14 – 15 August (2 episodes)	Kaleem Janjua	Pradeep is Pushpa Ferreira's (Madhur Jaffrey) new partner. He attends a family wedding with Pushpa and is threatened by her estranged husband, Dan Ferreira (Dalip Tahil) when a family argument breaks out.
Geoff Morton	4–5 September	Maurice Roëves	The alcoholic father of Kate Morton (Jill Halfpenny), who is also a Detective Chief Inspector. He arrives for her wedding to Phil Mitchell (Steve McFadden). He is not impressed on Phil's stag night, when Minty Peterson (Cliff Parisi) tells him about Phil's immigrant ex-wife Nadia (Anna Barkan). He is also disappointed that Phil does not drink, and accepts the dare of drinking a yard of ale, before being thrown out of The Queen Victoria pub for insulting Nana Moon (Hilda Braid). He then goes to Angie's Den where he insults Little Mo Mitchell (Kacey Ainsworth) and is hit by her husband, Billy (Perry Fenwick). He later refuses to attend Kate and Phil's wedding, but has a conversation with Phil about alcoholism and returns to Newcastle to seek help. However, in March 2004, Kate hears the news that Geoff has committed suicide.
John	15 September – 13 October (9 episodes)	Mark White	
Aaron	14 October	Thomas Aldridge	A member of a stag party at Angie's Den, who grabs Sharon Watts (Letitia Dean), and is thrown out by her adoptive father Den Watts (Leslie Grantham) and adoptive brother Dennis Rickman (Nigel Harman).
Mick	13 – 14 November (2 episodes)	Terry Stone	
Victor Duke	17–24 November	Ben Thomas	The husband of Yolande Duke (Angela Wynter), who arrives in Walford when his wife has run away to live with Patrick Trueman (Rudolph Walker). He offers Patrick £10,000 to leave Yolande, then tells Yolande that Patrick asked for money to finish with her, and when she sees Patrick with the money Victor tried to tempt him with, she takes the money and leaves, saying she does not want to be with either of them. After Victor returns to Trinidad, Yolande returns to Walford with the money, to share it with Patrick. Yolande later divorces Victor.
Mark Stone	17 – 18 November (2 episodes)	William Ilkeley	An old accomplice of Phil Mitchell (Steve McFadden), who meets him to discuss a robbery Phil plans on going on with Den Watts (Leslie Grantham).
Marlene	18 November	Christine Ellerbeck	Marlene is the mother of Alfie Moon's (Shane Richie) estranged wife Liza (Joanne Adams). Alfie tracks her down and asks for Liza's whereabouts in order divorce her so he can marry his fiancée, Kat Slater (Jessie Wallace). Marlene offers Alfie sex but He rejects her and she tells him Liza is well rid of him.
Mary Harkinson	2–26 December	Mary Woodvine	The estranged daughter of Derek Harkinson (Ian Lavender). She has not seen her father since he walked out on her mother, Cynthia, to live with another man, Robert (Paul Antony-Barber). When Derek's friend Pauline Fowler (Wendy Richard) finds out that Derek had children, she contacts Mary without telling Derek. Mary initially agrees to meet with Derek, but shuts the door in his face when he arrives at her house. Derek eventually persuades Mary to see him, and they meet, along with Mary's brother Alex (Ben Nealon) and his son Danny (Josh Alexander). Derek later leaves Walford to live with Mary after a string of arguments with Pauline.
Maxwell Moon	5–25 December	Andrew Paul	The second cousin of Alfie Moon (Shane Richie), who he visits on 5 December 2003. He enjoys a day of drinking and reminiscing about old times, but is offended when he realises Alfie has only invited him round to ask him a favour. Alfie wants a snow machine for his wedding to Kat Slater (Jessie Wallace), and he knows Maxwell could get him one, as he works in the film business. Maxwell rips up his wedding invite, but Kat charms him into coming to the wedding, while Alfie mends the invitation. Maxwell later attends the wedding on Christmas Day and provides a snow machine. Maxwell has not been seen since. However, in 2005, Alfie's brother, Spencer (Christopher Parker) gets into trouble with the police, and he is sent to live with Maxwell in Australia.
Liza Moon	5–8 December	Joanne Adams	The estranged wife of Alfie Moon (Shane Richie). She has not seen Alfie since he was sent to prison for credit card fraud, but Alfie visits her when he wants a divorce so he can marry Kat Slater (Jessie Wallace). Liza does not want a divorce but gives up on a reconciliation with Alfie when she realises he loves Kat, not her. She then agrees to a divorce and Alfie marries Kat on Christmas Day 2003.
Lewis Walker	8 – 25 December (5 episodes)	Terence Hillyer	A man who turns up on Alfie Moon (Shane Richie)'s wedding day and gives him the relevant documents to proceed with the wedding.
Leonard Jay	8 – 25 December (7 episodes)	Geoff Leesley	Registrar who performs Alfie Moon (Shane Richie) and Kat Slater's (Jessie Wallace) wedding.
Alex Harkinson	12–26 December	Ben Nealon	The estranged son of Derek Harkinson (Ian Lavender). He has not seen his father since he walked out on his mother, Cynthia, to live with another man, Robert (Paul Antony-Barber), when Alex was eight years old. When Derek's friend Pauline Fowler (Wendy Richard) goes to Alex's house to speak to him. Alex, not knowing that his father is gay, assumes that Pauline is the woman for whom Derek had left Cynthia, and tells her to leave. Alex's sister Mary (Mary Woodvine) later visits Derek on Boxing Day 2003, and is followed by Alex, who berates her and argues with Derek, but later relents and introduces him to his son, Danny (Josh Alexander).
PC Paula Campbell	16 – 19 December (6 episodes)	Mia Soteriou	A police officer at Walford Constabulary. She is Little Mo Mitchell's (Kacey Ainsworth) police liaison officer during her rape case against Graham Foster (Alex McSweeney). Graham raped her and she pressed charges, so Paula is assigned the job of liaising with Little Mo and her family.
Danny Harkinson	22–26 December	Josh Alexander	The grandson of Derek Harkinson's (Ian Lavender), who is the son of Alex (Ben Nealon). He has never met his grandfather until Alex and Derek reconcile on Boxing Day 2003, and Alex introduces him to Derek
Ray Collins	25 December	David Walliams	A friend of Alfie Moon (Shane Richie) who poses as a registrar and tries to perform Alfie's wedding to Kat Slater (Jessie Wallace).
Tony Macrae	31 December-2 January 2004	Tam White	A local who lives near the Scottish hotel where Barry Evans (Shaun Williamson) and Janine Butcher (Charlie Brooks) are married. He acts as one of the witnesses, alongside Paul Trueman (Gary Beadle), to Barry and Janine's quiet wedding in the hotel. When Janine pushes Barry into a ravine, Tony joins the search party to look for Barry, and eventually finds his body in the ravine.
