= Ferreira family =

Fictional family from the BBC soap opera EastEnders

- EastEnders family
- The core Ferreira family (L-R: Ash, Dan, Kareena, Ronny, Adi)
- First appearance: Episode 2528; 3 June 2003
- Last appearance: Episode 2910; 22 March 2005
- Created by: Tony Jordan
- Introduced by: Louise Berridge
- Duration: 2003–2005
Family members
Dan Ferreira
- Portrayed by: Dalip Tahil
- Relationship: Head of family
- First appearance: Episode 2528; 3 June 2003
- Last appearance: Episode 2650; 30 December 2003
Pushpa Ferreira
- Portrayed by: Madhur Jaffrey
- Relationship: Wife of Dan
- First appearance: Episode 2544; 1 July 2003
- Last appearance: Episode 2570; 15 August 2003
Ash Ferreira
- Portrayed by: Raji James
- Relationship: Son of Dan and Pushpa
- First appearance: Episode 2529; 5 June 2003
- Last appearance: Episode 2910; 22 March 2005
- Occupation: Minicab controller, lecturer
Adi Ferreira
- Portrayed by: Ameet Chana
- Relationship: Son of Dan and Pushpa
- First appearance: Episode 2529; 5 June 2003
- Last appearance: Episode 2910; 22 March 2005
- Occupation: Minicab driver
Ronny Ferreira
- Portrayed by: Ray Panthaki
- Relationship: Son of Dan and Pushpa
- First appearance: Episode 2529; 5 June 2003
- Last appearance: Episode 2910; 22 March 2005
- Occupation: DJ, minicab driver
Kareena Ferreira
- Portrayed by: Pooja Shah
- Relationship: Daughter of Dan and Pushpa
- First appearance: Episode 2528; 3 June 2003
- Last appearance: Episode 2910; 22 March 2005
- Occupation: Bar staff
Tariq Larousi
- Portrayed by: Nabil Elouahabi
- Relationship: Son of Dan and an unknown woman
- First appearance: Episode 2529; 5 June 2003
- Last appearance: Episode 2910; 22 March 2005
- Occupation: Promoter, minicab driver

The Ferreira family are a fictional family from the BBC soap opera EastEnders, that appeared on screen between 2003 and 2005. Created by Tony Jordan and introduced by Louise Berridge as a new Asian family, producers hoped they would become central to the show. However, after Indian actor Dalip Tahil was forced to leave due to a controversy over his work permit, a major plot involving the family had to be scrapped and was replaced with a kidney transplant storyline that was branded "boring". It was later revealed that the dropped storyline involved Dan being murdered by his children and buried in a shallow grave. The characters were also called "unrealistic", "annoying", and "unlikeable" by many of the show's fans and critics. They were blamed for a decline in the show's viewing figures and were eventually axed by Kathleen Hutchison after bosses struggled to find storylines for the family. Jordan later admitted the family's members were "the least successful characters [he] created".

== Creation ==
The Ferreiras were introduced in March 2003 as the first Asian family in EastEnders since Sanjay (Deepak Verma) and Gita Kapoor (Shobu Kapoor), who both departed from the show in 1998. They were also the first large family to arrive since the Slater family's arrival in 2000. The family were the creation of writer Tony Jordan, and Bollywood star Dalip Tahil was cast by the show's executive producer, Louise Berridge, to play Dan Ferreira, the patriarch of the family. The family, from Goa in India, also consisted of Dan's three sons, Ronny (played by Ray Panthaki), Ash (Raji James) and Adi (Ameet Chana), and daughter Kareena (Pooja Shah). Ronny's friend Tariq Larousi, played by Nabil Elouahabi, also joined the show at the same time.

BBC drama bosses worked on introducing an Asian family, who would be central to the show, for a couple of years. Berridge commented on the casting: "After a search which has taken more than two years, and in which we have met literally hundreds of people, we have finally found the perfect cast for our dynamic new family. We're delighted to welcome the Ferreiras to Albert Square and I'm sure the viewers will be too." Berridge also claimed the show didn't set out to look for an Asian family, saying: "We wanted a new family as there were various elements missing from the show. I thought we were short on males and needed a surge of testosterone," and said that the characters were formed around the actors: "We didn't set out knowing exactly what we wanted. We workshopped constantly, trying out different improvisations with the actors and the characters evolved."

It was hoped that the family would have a big impact on the other characters. The show's producers apparently vowed not to include too many racial issues in the family's storylines, although upon their arrival, the character of Jim Branning (John Bardon) was heard saying "they're Indian, they do like to pack 'em in, don't they?" in reference to the family's size.

On being cast in the show, Tahil admitted that he wasn't unaware of how big a part of British culture the soap was until he arrived in the United Kingdom, saying "It's going to be a big adventure." Shah commented "Joining EastEnders is a dream come true. I have been a fan of the programme for many years and I'm looking forward to joining the cast."

The family first appeared on screen on 3 June 2003. Later on in the year Indian chef Madhur Jaffrey was cast in EastEnders as Dan's estranged wife, Pushpa. Jaffrey commented, "I really wanted to do the role because Indian women are usually portrayed as so proper and withdrawn – the kind of women who just stay at home cooking and cleaning. I thought, 'How wonderful of EastEnders to write a character that is realistic.' What my character has done happens all the time in India; there are all kinds of stories of people running away and marrying their lovers. This is what commonly happens in those places, but somehow the image of Indian womanhood is different." Pushpa was a guest character only appearing for the duration of a storyline that revealed Dan had been lying about her death and had actually left him for another man, Pradeep (Kaleem Janjua) Dan's best friend.

== Development ==
In November 2003, it emerged that actor Dalip Tahil faced being axed from the show due to not having the correct work permit. It was reported that after Tahil joined EastEnders from appearing in stage musical Bombay Dreams, neither he nor the BBC had obtained proper authorisation from the Home Office to make the switch of employment legal. The BBC issued a one-line statement, which read: "We are considering any potential problems with a view to resolving them as soon as possible." Tahil was forced to leave the show, and made his last appearance on 30 December 2003, although the actor was eventually allowed to remain in the UK.

Following Tahil's departure, plots were abandoned and many scripts had to be rewritten. EastEnders scriptwriter Tony Jordan revealed that it was intended that Dan would be murdered by his children after prolonged bullying and abuse, saying "The family arrived in Albert Square in what was expected to be a huge storyline. The father [...] was an oppressive and violent bully – eventually his children were going to kill him. It was all scripted – how they buried him in a shallow grave, how they dealt with it, and how it all exploded. And then Dalip got bloody deported. He was actually on the studio floor and they marched him off. Broken legs, nervous breakdowns – we can deal with that. But when actors are physically taken away by the government and deported, there's not much you can do. Fifty scripts had to be reworked. And because all the episodes had been written around this big storyline, we had to keep the same amount of Ferreira material." The murder storyline was replaced with one concerning a kidney transplant between Ronny and his newly discovered half brother Tariq. Jordan admitted they could have recast the character of Dan, but it may have looked "tacky": "We couldn't go, 'Tonight, the part of Mr Ferreira will be played by Michael French with a suntan'. We were trying to do it with integrity. Then somebody said, 'What if Ronnie Ferreira's mate Tariq turns out to be his half-brother and we do the whole kidney transplant thing?' And, of course, it was like watching paint dry. 'Can I have your kidney?' 'No. Oh, go on then...'" Jordan told the Daily Mirror the Ferreiras were "the least successful characters I created – through no fault of their own."

Tariq Larousi (Nabil Elouahabi) was revealed to be the illegitimate son of Dan.

Berridge defended the family, saying that Tahil's departure caused many problems, however, she added, "[T]he Ferreiras have not been as successful as we had hoped. I think in retrospect we made a mistake in giving their entrance such a fanfare as a New Asian Family. Viewers traditionally take a long time to adapt to anyone new [...] so it was wrong to emphasise what was different about this family from the start. Even so, we had a terrific first story for them, which was to have culminated in a huge, action storyline to mark the exit of their father. However, the sudden removal of actor Dalip Tahil, for reasons beyond our control, meant that the story had to be abandoned quickly – and 40 scripts rewritten on the spot. The result was the transplant story, which I have to admit did go on for far too long, especially when our biggest story in this period had also to be abandoned because of the pregnancy of Kacey Ainsworth. The writers and production team did their very best under these circumstances but I would be the first to admit the end result was not our finest hour. I hope that viewers will not hold this against the Ferreira family and will be prepared to watch the next stage of their stories with an open mind. This is a very talented bunch of actors, who've had to put up with a lot of stick for problems which have not been of their making. Viewer response to their lighter material was very favourable and I am confident the Ferreiras will regain their popularity." Lorraine Heggessey, controller of BBC One, said the show became overdependent on the kidney transplant storyline as there were several cast problems, such as illness, pregnancy, rehab and a car crash. Berridge quit as executive producer of EastEnders and was replaced by Kathleen Hutchison.

In April 2004, producers were concerned that the family were losing popularity with viewers, and a decision was made to write Pooja Shah out of the show for a while, but to bring her back with a sexier image to rival Michelle Ryan, who played Zoe Slater. Shah expressed a dislike of her character, saying "I'm fed up with it now. Kareena's too dowdy. I wanted Kareena to be different, to stand out. If I'm completely honest, I can't stand her – she just grates on my nerves. She hasn't got many friends, but then I wouldn’t be her friend if I met her." The family had failed and rumours began that the entire family would be killed off in a house fire. A further attempt to "spice up" the family was made in July 2004 by bringing back character Sasha Perkins, played by Jemma Walker, and having her move in with the Ferreiras.

The show struggled to find storylines for Dan's children, and the remainder of the family, including Sasha Perkins, were dropped from the show by Hutchison in October 2004. This was claimed to be a mutual decision between the programme makers and the actors, as the characters had "run their course." They made their final on-screen appearance on 22 March 2005.

== Family tree ==
	Pushpa Ferreira	Dan Ferreira	Mrs Larousi
Ash Ferreira	Adi Ferreira	Ronny Ferreira	Kareena Ferreira	Tariq Larousi

== Storylines ==
=== Background ===
Dan Ferreira is a fan of Elvis Presley, portrayed as a womaniser and a bully. He claims to be a widower, talking about his wife as being dead, both to the neighbours and his children, but they have merely separated after she had an affair with his best friend, whom she moved in with. Ash is portrayed as the intelligent member of the family, the standard of his education being much higher than his siblings, so much so that he is a lecturer. He has an on/off problem with gambling, something that presumably led to the breakup of his first marriage, before he is seen on screen. Kareena is in a relationship with Tariq, though it is not a sexual one. Ronny works as a DJ under the name DJ Ronny Flawless, and Tariq is his best friend and promoter.

=== 2003–2005 ===
The Ferreiras move to Albert Square in 2003. Kareena and Adi run a clothes stall on the market, Ash starts working at the local community centre, and Ronny earns money as a disc jockey, managed by his friend, Tariq, whom Dan dislikes. It transpires that Tariq is in a secret relationship with Kareena, but the Ferreiras discover this after they split up, causing further animosity between Tariq and Dan.

Dan starts a relationship with Shirley Benson (Robyn Moore), telling her that his wife, Pushpa, is dead. He takes her to a wedding as his guest, but Pushpa arrives, introducing herself and exposing Dan's lie. Shirley then breaks up with him. The Ferreiras help Shirley to deal with her neighbour from hell, Gavin Sharp (Steve Nicolson), which leads to Shirley and Ash becoming close and starting a secret relationship. Shirley is unhappy that Ash refuses to tell anyone about their relationship, as he knows his father will be furious if he discovers them together. Ash reveals to Shirley that he is a compulsive gambler and he lost his house and ruined his marriage in the process; Dan had bailed him out. He says he owes his father everything and he is not willing to hurt him. Dan attempts to woo Shirley again, forcing her to confess her relationship with Ash. This causes friction between the Ferreiras, and Ash breaks up with Shirley to keep the peace.

Ronny's love life is equally unsettled. He begins dating Kelly Taylor (Brooke Kinsella), but ends the relationship when he discovers her past as a prostitute and begins dating Kelly's best friend, Zoe Slater (Michelle Ryan). This abruptly ends when Kelly witnesses Ronny kissing another woman. Meanwhile, Adi has a romance with Sasha Perkins (Jemma Walker), a pole dancer and escort, who he initially pays to pretend to be his girlfriend. He strives to impress his father but fails. Dan disappears suddenly and clears out the family's bank account, leaving his children £12,000 in mortgage arrears. The truth behind his disappearance is never revealed.

Ronny is stabbed by a gang while trying to protect Tariq and has to have his kidney removed. However, it is discovered he was born with just one and will need a kidney transplant. None of his siblings are a tissue match, so Ash, Adi and Kareena visit their mother, but her kidney is not a match either. Tariq is forced to reveal that he is Dan's son, and he donates his kidney to Ronny. He explains that he thought having a mildly romantic relationship with his half sister would bring him closer to the family. Adi dislikes the fact he and Tariq are half brothers, but mellows towards him eventually. When bailiffs arrive to evict the family from their home, they board themselves into their living room, but eventually admit defeat and move into a flat with Sasha, starting a minicab firm called Toucan Cars.

Kareena begins dating Mickey Miller (Joe Swash), but problems arise between them when Juley Smith (Joseph Kpobie) gives Kareena cocaine and she is seduced by him, though she manages to sort out her differences with Mickey eventually. Adi also has relationship problems after Sasha cheats on him with hothead gangster Danny Moon (Jake Maskall), leading to the couple's split. Later on, the whole family gets into trouble with Danny's employer Johnny Allen (Billy Murray) - also the square's reigning gangland boss - after the latter agrees to loan several cars to the Ferreiras' business. However, three of the vehicles end up getting stolen. Johnny quickly discovers this and orders the family to either leave Walford immediately or face repercussions. Kareena initially opts to remain in Walford with Mickey, but at the last minute she changes her mind and departs with the rest of her family in March 2005.

== Reception ==
Tahil's casting was considered to be controversial, and was slammed by British Asian actors who said the part should have been given to a UK actor, referring to it as "disgraceful". Actors Albert Moses and Renu Setna complained that home-grown talent was being overlooked, with Moses saying, "British Asian actors have been fighting for the last five years to persuade the BBC to bring an Asian family into EastEnders and when at last it happens it goes to Bollywood. It is a disgrace and an insult to British Asian actors. This is a terrible thing for the BBC to do. It should be ashamed." Setna said: "I have heard that for this storyline the BBC has brought over a Bollywood star to play the father. Why, when we have excellent Asian actors of our own?" British immigration laws state that nationals from outside the European Union should not replace resident actors capable of doing the same work. A spokesperson for the BBC responded: "After due consideration, Dalip was deemed to be the most appropriate actor for the job." Additionally, it was suggested that Madhur Jaffrey was miscast in the role of Dan's wife Pushpa.

Several of the family's storylines were criticised and branded as unbelievable and poorly researched, and they were cited as one of the main reasons viewing figures for the show dropped to a low of 6.2 million. One columnist for the Daily Mirror wrote, "Never has a family bored me so much. During their transplant saga I nearly donated a kidney myself to end the turgid tale. Get rid of 'em." Fans called for the family to be axed, and an editorial on the Daily Mirror stated: "The Ferreiras' father, Dan, was probably not just the worst character in soap, but the most annoying, unlikeable person on all television. Inveterate gambler, Ash and daughter Kareena are mere ciphers while Adi is just weird – like a gay version of a character from Rainbow. Ronny Ferreira, meanwhile, [...] presided over the most boring storyline in EastEnders' history when viewers spent several weeks watching him lying in bed growing a beard (i.e. waiting for a kidney transplant). The fact that the Ferreiras still haven't been axed shows how indecisive and complacent the show's executives have become." However, a poll on radio station BBC Asian Network found that 75% of respondents wanted the family to stay.

One thousand young Asian professionals were surveyed on their opinions of the family, with most respondents saying the family were extremely unrealistic. One girl said, "I think the Ferreiras are shit! The story lines are stupid, unrealistic and dull. Most Asians would not get evicted and then remain homeless, they would go to an aunty." A female PR manager told the survey: "Just how many shades of brown can there be in one family? You can't put them in any context. They have no background," and another participant said, "The Ferreiras should just be killed off. They are pointless, boring and the storylines are rubbish." A barrister criticised the family's names, saying their first names were a mixture of Muslim and Hindu and their surname was Portuguese so the family should have been Catholic.

Following the axing of the family, actor Ameet Chana accused the BBC of discriminating against the family, saying, "I'm not afraid to admit that the Ferreira family have been treated like [shit]. We've been made scapegoats, discriminated against. They wouldn't do this to the Watts or Slater family. [...] The Ferreira family have had bad storylines and we've taken the blame for it."

The family's Goan origin was also criticised by Samir Shah, a member of the BBC's board of directors, citing it as an example of "inauthentic representation" of ethnic minority communities. He said, "If you were to cast an Asian family in the East End, it should have been Bangladeshi. Instead we had a family of Goan descent." A report by the Equality and Human Rights Commission claimed that the Ferreiras were an example of stereotyping in the media.
