= Gus Smith =

- EastEnders character
- Portrayed by: Mohammed George
- Duration: 2002–2008
- First appearance: Episode 2314; 28 May 2002
- Last appearance: Episode 3569; 1 May 2008
- Introduced by: John Yorke
In-universe information
- Occupation: Road sweeper
- Mother: Pearl Smith
- Half-brothers: Juley Smith; Mikey Smith
- Aunts: Opal Smith

Gus Smith is a fictional character from the BBC soap opera EastEnders, played by Mohammed George. He made his first appearance on 28 May 2002. It was announced in January 2008 that Gus would leave the show later in 2008, and he made his last appearance on 1 May 2008.

== Development ==
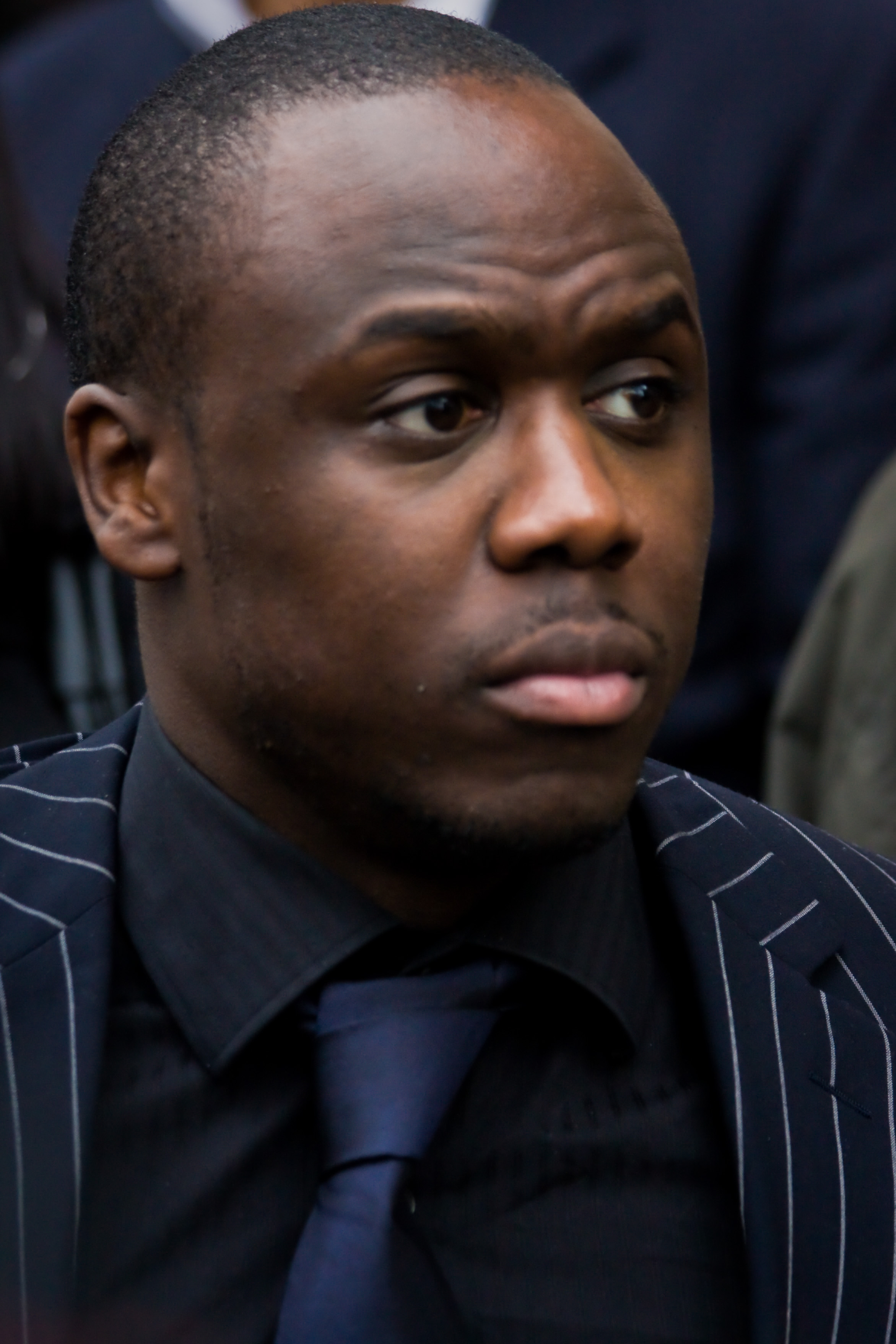
Mohammed George (pictured) was suspended from the soap in 2007.

Mohammed George's first appearance as Gus aired in 2002. George originally auditioned for EastEnders as a member of the Trueman family, but was deemed by producers to be too young to play either Anthony Trueman or Paul Trueman. In 2007, George was suspended from the show for two months after he was cautioned by police over allegations that he caused actual bodily harm against his partner.

On 18 January 2008, it was reported that Gus would leave the series, and that it was a mutual decision between George and the producers. A spokesperson for the show said, "As the character did not have any big plots coming up it was agreed Mohammed would leave. He is in talks with the BBC about other projects." Of his departure, George said: "I've always been an EastEnders fan, so it has been an honour and pleasure being in the show. And I'm thankful that Gus wasn't overused on screen, as it means that I haven't been typecast. I definitely feel ready to step into the shoes of a new character." In February 2010, George claimed that the decision for him to leave was not his, and said that the show's bosses had "believed" a tabloid newspaper's claims made in relation to his arrest, which later proved to be false. He said, "They said I'd be leaving by mutual agreement but, of course, it wasn't really like that. Instead of supporting me, they believed the bad press I'd got after all that bother with [my partner]. They just sold me down the river. It's been nearly two years since I left and I haven’t had one single acting job since. But I'm not going to give up."

Discussing his character's exit storyline from the soap, George commented at the time: "Gus is wishing he'd never put himself in the position of sharing a flat with this madman (Sean Slater). At this point, he's beside himself. Sean's crazy and looking for a target, and there's only one way this situation can end—Gus is convinced that Sean's going to do him in. [...] He goes so far as to barricade himself inside the flat—I think he loses it a bit, to be honest. Gus hasn't really got any friends left in the Square, and all he wants is for somebody to rescue him and take him away from this awful situation." The reappearance of the character's former girlfriend Keisha proves conflicting for Gus, on which George said, "I think Gus is the type of guy who desperately wants to settle down with the girl of his dreams. It's very hard for him when he sees Keisha, because she hurt him so badly with Sean, and that pain hasn't gone away. But Gus is a very forgiving person, so who knows what will happen..."

== Storylines ==
Gus first arrives in Walford in May 2002, working for a bed company and meets Sonia Jackson (Natalie Cassidy). Gus falls in love with Sonia and they get together after she splits up with Jamie Mitchell (Jack Ryder). When she and Jamie realise they still have feelings for each other, she breaks up with Gus and reconciles with Jamie. In July, Gus is joined in Walford by his troublesome brother Juley (Joseph Kpobie), taking over as local road sweeper, and is given Wellard the dog when his friend Robbie Jackson (Dean Gaffney) leaves London for India.

When friends Martin (James Alexandrou) and Vicki Fowler (Scarlett Johnson) break into the Minute Mart, Gus investigates, is caught by police and is left to take the blame. In December 2003, Gus goes on a trip to Scotland in a minibus with Zoe Slater (Michelle Ryan), Kelly Taylor (Brooke Kinsella), Mickey Miller (Joe Swash), Spencer Moon (Christopher Parker), Sonia, Martin, Vicki, Tariq Larousi (Nabil Elouahabi), Ronny (Ray Panthaki) and Kareena Ferreira (Pooja Shah). When the bus crashes on a moor, nearly killing Zoe, Gus and Wellard manage to find help for his stranded friends.

In 2004, Gus disposes of a handgun he found in Juley's bag. Juley's involvement in crime, including the theft of some charity money, leads to his departure from Walford in April 2005, though he returns in September for a trip to France with Gus, Mickey, Garry Hobbs (Ricky Groves) and Minty Peterson (Cliff Parisi). While in France, Gus meets Mickey's sister and father Dawn and Mike Swann (Kara Tointon and Mark Wingett). Mike exposes Juley as a con man, despite Juley's claims that he is a reformed character. Gus persuades Juley to return to Walford permanently to turn over a new leaf.

In late 2005, Wellard bites Ian Beale (Adam Woodyatt), who decides he wants the dog put down. Wellard is imprisoned pending a trial, but is freed on 12 January 2006, after Ian's partner Jane Collins (Laurie Brett) and children Peter (James Martin) and Lucy (Melissa Suffield) give character witness statements. When Juley mugs his ex-girlfriend, Ruby Allen (Louisa Lytton), Jake Moon (Joel Beckett) threatens to report Juley to the police. Gus helps Juley escape, despite being disgusted at Juley's actions, by stalling Jake and letting Juley out of the back door. Gus is briefly reunited with Sonia when she breaks up with girlfriend Naomi Julien (Petra Letang), but she leaves him to reconcile with her husband Martin.

In April 2008, Gus meets and falls for a girl called Keisha (Suzie McGrath) but catches her in bed with Sean Slater (Robert Kazinsky), his lodger who is two months behind on his rent. Sean fools Keisha into thinking Gus is a womaniser. After announcing what Sean did to everyone in the pub, including Sean's girlfriend, Roxy Mitchell (Rita Simons), Gus attempts to evict Sean but is kicked out himself. Sean threatens to kill him if he doesn't pay the rent, and keeps Wellard. Sean later claims to want to make amends with Gus, but tricks him into believing he has killed and eaten his dog. On 28 April he is tied to a chair and Sean is about to give him a beating when Sean's sister Stacey Slater (Lacey Turner) walks through the door and stops him. Having been reunited with Keisha, Gus leaves on 1 May to travel with her band. However, he finally gets his revenge on Sean before leaving, by exposing him as a cocaine dealer.

== Reception ==
Angie Quinn from MyLondon called Gus a "legendary Walford road sweeper" who "instantly won the hearts of soap fans thanks to his sensitive nature and loving ways". She added that viewers of the soap "adored Gus Smith as much as he loved sweeping the streets of Walford".
