= Kate Mitchell (EastEnders) =

Character in EastEnders

- EastEnders character
- Portrayed by: Jill Halfpenny
- Duration: 2002–2005
- First appearance: Episode 2434; 24 December 2002
- Last appearance: Episode 2688; 7 January 2005
- Introduced by: Louise Berridge
In-universe information
- Other names: Kate Mitchell; Kate Tyler (undercover name)
- Occupation: Police officer Nail technician
- Family: Mitchell
- Father: Geoff Morton
- Husband: Phil Mitchell (2003–2005)
- Stepsons: Ben Mitchell
- Stepdaughters: Louise Mitchell

Kate Mitchell (also Tyler and Morton) is a fictional character from the BBC soap opera EastEnders, played by Jill Halfpenny. She first appeared on 24 December 2002 and made her last on 7 January 2005.

== Creation and development ==
It was announced on 6 October 2004 that Halfpenny had been axed by a new executive producer, Kathleen Hutchison. Halfpenny was said to be "devastated" by this news. A BBC spokeswoman told The Mirror that "Jill's contract has come to an end, but that is no reflection on her as an actress. The producers just felt there was nowhere left for the character to go. She won't be killed off, and the door will be left open for her to return."

== Storylines ==
Kate Morton is an undercover policewoman who begins a relationship with Phil Mitchell (Steve McFadden). Initially meeting Phil in hospital while visiting his godson, Jamie (Jack Ryder), Kate adopts the fake identity of the nail technician Kate Tyler. Kate assists her boss, Jill Marsden (Sophie Stanton), and DI Dominic Price (Paul Brennen), orchestrate a strategic honey trap, hoping Phil will confess to murdering his ex-girlfriend Lisa Fowler (Lucy Benjamin). However, Kate unintentionally sabotages her own efforts by falling in love with Phil, prompting Marsden to fire her. Phil soon learns about Kate's police identity and ends their relationship, threatening to kill her if they ever meet again.

Soon afterwards, Kate receives a directive to probe into the Imperial Room nightclub, owned by the square's reigning crime kingpin, Jack Dalton (Hywel Bennett). Going undercover as Dalton's secretary, Kate's true police identity is exposed, leading Dalton to plot her demise. He dispatches his employee, George Peters (Andy Beckwith), to carry out a sinister plan involving the heinous acts of rape and murder at Kate's residence. Ironically, Phil has been monitoring Dalton's criminal reign, studying its impact on the neighbors around the square. When Phil learns about Kate working for Dalton and his plans to have her killed, he comes to her rescue just as Peters breaks into her house. Phil knocks out Peters and, after persuading Kate not to get the police involved, orders her to go to the square's café on her own and wait for him to return after taking care of Dalton and Peters. When he does return that night, Phil forgives Kate, and they continue their relationship. Dalton is later killed by Phil's love rival, Dennis Rickman (Nigel Harman), with whom Kate had a fling in the past. Rickman's representative, Andy Hunter (Michael Higgs), takes control of Dalton's criminal organization, The Firm.

After quitting her job as a policewoman, Kate sets up a nail salon called "SophistiKate's." Her romance with Phil escalates and he later proposes marriage, which she accepts. On their wedding day, however, she is troubled by the presence of her alcoholic father, Geoff (Maurice Roëves), specifically when he openly dislikes Phil, until the pair make up for Kate's sake. Another unwelcome presence is Lisa, who requests access to her daughter, Louise (Rachel Cox), and they agree. However, Lisa is unhappy that Louise lives with Phil and she plans to reclaim their daughter with the help of his arch-enemy and Dennis' father, Den Watts (Leslie Grantham). After coaxing Phil into missing his date with Kate so he can partake in an armed robbery with him, Den sets Phil up for the crime and flees with all the money, which results in Phil getting arrested and jailed. As Kate learns about the situation, Den helps Lisa reclaim her residency, and she later departs Walford with Louise. When Kate discovers what Phil has done, she becomes disgusted and ends her marriage to him. On Christmas Day 2003, Kate is surprised when Phil escapes prison and confronts her. They partially make amends before he flees the Square.

In 2004, Kate makes friends with Little Mo Mitchell (Kacey Ainsworth) after being the first person to learn that she had been raped by Graham Foster (Alex McSweeney), a man frequenting the Queen Vic. Kate urges Mo to tell her what had happened, but she does not react well, as it sparks childhood memories of when her mother was raped. Kate takes Mo to the police to report the crime and supports her until Mo leaves Walford. Mo returns for the trial with her baby son, Freddie. Graham's mother approaches Mo and meets her grandson before commenting about another grandchild she cannot see. Kate reports this to the prosecution's legal team, and Graham is convicted of rape.

Kate soon establishes a business partnership with Den's wife, Chrissie (Tracy-Ann Oberman), as she turns out to also be a professional hairdresser. Kate and Den begin an affair, and when Chrissie finds out, she ransacks the salon and smashes the mirrors. Chrissie offers to cut Kate's hair, and Kate agrees, despite earlier insisting that she is too busy. With the reason for the mirrors being smashed explained, Chrissie asks awkward questions about Kate's 'mystery man,' with Kate unaware that Chrissie knows about her and Den. Chrissie questions Kate about her lover and cuts her long hair off, leaving most of it short at the nape of her neck. Chrissie attacks Kate and smashes a window before telling Kate's family about the affair and leaving Walford for a few months. Kate has her hair restyled and continues to work at the salon; Chrissie returns to the salon and continues working there until her investment is paid back. Eventually, Kate and Chrissie become friends again. Later, Kate is offered a job in the police department; she accepts it, closes the salon, and leaves Walford for Brighton, where she starts anew.

== Reception ==
Jo Atkinson from the Western Mail discussed the Kate/Phil/Marsden storyline, saying, "Betrayal with a capital B is the order of the day in the Square this week. It's the cop Kate plot I'm interested in. To shop or not to shop is a dilemma that Kate finds hard to cope with as she waits for the confession that will nail Phil for good".

In 2012, Halfpenny told a reporter from STV that she still received fan mail regarding Kate from foreign audiences. She added that some could not believe that Kate has sexual relations with Phil. In 2022, Tricia Martin from OK! described Kate as "the copper who found an unlikely love interest in wayward Phil Mitchell".
