= Watts family =

Fictional family from EastEnders, created 1985

- EastEnders family
- Left to right: Vicki, Dennis, Sharon, Den
- First appearance: Episode 1; 19 February 1985
- Created by: Tony Holland and Julia Smith
- Introduced by: Julia Smith (1985); John Yorke (2001); Bryan Kirkwood (2012)
- Duration: 1985–1995, 2001–2006, 2012–present

The Watts family are a fictional family in the BBC soap opera EastEnders. The family consists of Den (Leslie Grantham), Angie (Anita Dobson), Sharon (Letitia Dean), Dennis (Nigel Harman), Chrissie (Tracy-Ann Oberman), Vicki (Scarlett Alice Johnson/Alice Haig), Dennis Jnr (Bleu Landau), Albie and Alyssa. Sharon, Vicki and Albie are the only members of the family currently in the show, but Sharon's biological half-brother, Zack Hudson (James Farrar), and Vicki's husband, Ross Marshall (Alex Walkinshaw), are considered part of the unit.

The Watts family have been a major part of EastEnders since its inception in 1985, anchoring its early success in the mid to late 1980s and then again dominating the action with their various comebacks since 2001. Their longstanding "feud" with the Mitchell family has become a hallmark of the show, as has their warring for the Queen Vic pub, the original and traditional home of the Watts family. Over the years the fractured family has centred largely on Den and his "princess", Sharon, with familial affairs also being marked by Den's tumultuous marriages with his long-suffering first wife, Angie, and scheming second wife, Chrissie, as well as Sharon's relationship with Den's biological son Dennis.

The Watts family is one of EastEnders' original families (together with the Fowlers and Beales) and has been involved in many memorable storylines. The Watts are considered some of the show's most 'iconic' characters.

== Creation and development ==
=== Introduction ===
Originally introduced Wattses: Den, Angie, Sharon and Roly the poodle in the 1980s

The Watts family were one of the central families introduced to viewers when EastEnders began in 1985, created by the show's co-creators Tony Holland and Julia Smith. Holland and Smith had correctly anticipated the importance The Queen Vic setting would have to EastEnders and therefore intended the Watts to be highly dynamic and vibrant characters fuelling the drama of the show, something that has largely been a hallmark of the family ever since, even as new members have been added, with the character of Dennis a popular favourite among audiences, winning various soap and television awards, and Chrissie largely the "centrepiece" of the show during her tenure. The Watts were originally composed of Den and Angie and their adoptive daughter Sharon. The early focus of the family was on the tempestuous marriage between Den and Angie, rooted in Den's womanising and the couple's many heated arguments. Indeed, Den's wandering eye is a central element in the family affairs of the Watts family and would frame many of their storylines over the years, leading him into affairs with women including Jan Hammond (Jane How), Kate Mitchell (Jill Halfpenny), and finally Zoe Slater (Michelle Ryan). In May 1986, Sharon's 17-year-old friend Michelle Fowler (Susan Tully) gave birth to Vicki, the product of an illicit relationship with Den (who was almost 40 years old). In 2003, it was revealed that Den had fathered another child - Dennis Rickman (Nigel Harman) - as a result of another affair 30 years earlier.

In April 1988, Anita Dobson made her last appearance as Angie Watts, and around this time Leslie Grantham expressed his desire to step down from the role of Den Watts. However, the show's producers did not want to suffer the double blow of losing both characters so close together, so Den's last appearance was aired in February 1989, although he had filmed his final EastEnders scenes in the autumn of 1988.

Letitia Dean remained in the role as Sharon until 1995, her character helping to facilitate the introduction of a new family - the Mitchells, who were one of the central families in the show from 1990 - through her marriage to Grant Mitchell (Ross Kemp) and her affair with his brother Phil (Steve McFadden), a storyline which caused her marriage to fall apart and prompt her exit from the show after 10 years. The revelation of her affair and the breakdown of her marriage is widely held to be EastEnders' most notable storyline of the 1990s and is seen by many as the show's finest moment, dubbed "Sharongate" by the press and fans alike. It is also the culminating point to Sharon's original run in EastEnders, as Dean had informed BBC bosses of her intention to quit EastEnders, and the following year she left the show, with Sharon departing to America to live with Angie.

As of 2026, Sharon, her son Albie (Arthur Gentleman), and Vicki are the only members of the Watts family left on the show. Sharon's biological half-brother Zack Hudson (James Farrar) and Vicki's husband Ross Marshall (Alex Walkinshaw) can also be considered a part of the family.

=== Return of the Watts ===
However, the popularity of the Watts family to viewers and the importance of the family to the show meant that successive producers and executives continually asked Dean, Dobson, and Grantham to reprise their roles. By 2001, John Yorke succeeded where others had failed, and Sharon made a triumphant return as the new secret owner of the Queen Vic, Yorke having "first floated the idea of Sharon's return" the previous year. The return was part of a highly successful year for EastEnders, and to build upon that success it was decided by Yorke, his successor Louise Berridge and Head of Drama Serials Mal Young to expand Sharon's familial connections and bring the Watts family back to Walford.

By the time Sharon returned to EastEnders, producers and executives began work on reconstituting the family; although Anita Dobson rejected the last of several offers to return to the show and her character's off-screen death was announced in the spring of 2002, Grantham finally agreed to return as Den in 2003, to accompany the re-introduction of his family, with Den's unknown son Dennis being introduced in April 2003, shortly after a teenage Vicki Fowler was brought back into the show, having left with her mother Michelle in 1995. Although a Fowler, Vicki maintained a close relationship with Sharon, with her storylines centring mainly around the Watts saga. The return of Den reunited the fractured Watts family, creating "a real buzz to the show".

Den's return was widely regarded as a coup and seen as instrumental to EastEnders' success at the time, which was facing tight competition from the ITV soaps, with Coronation Street enjoying one of its most successful years ever, and Emmerdale in the midst of a ratings revival. The return of Den, who had supposedly died when he fell into a canal after being shot by a mysterious gunman in February 1989, was seen as far-fetched by many critics, although the scene had been set at the time of his demise to allow the possibility of him returning to the show, and BBC bosses had approached actor Leslie Grantham a number of times before about a possible return to EastEnders.

With Den set to stay, the Watts family was completed in the shape of Den's second wife Chrissie, who arrived in the spring of 2004, having finally followed her husband back to England from Spain - where Den had been living since his faked death in 1989. Although similar to Angie in many ways, Chrissie was intended to be more actively independent and as devious and conniving as her husband.

Again, the family was to be increasingly dominated by the volatile relationship between husband and wife, culminating in Den's death in February 2005, after Leslie Grantham decided not to extend his current contract. This followed the departure of actress Scarlett Johnson from the programme with Vicki making her last appearance on Christmas Day 2004. However, the importance of the Watts family to the dramatic action of the show took its toll on the actors, especially Tracy-Ann Oberman, who played Chrissie, with the actress noting how "in 18 months I knocked up four years of acting experience". By the autumn of 2005, it had been announced that all three actors who played the remaining on-screen Watts family members would not be seeking to renew their contracts and would be leaving over the next few months. All three had exited the show by January 2006, with Dennis being sensationally killed off in the episode aired on 30 December 2005 and Sharon departing to America in the new year, while Chrissie was imprisoned after finally being arrested for the murder of Den.

=== Sharon's return ===
Despite an official BBC report in 2005 stating that Letitia Dean was taking a scheduled break and would return to EastEnders later in 2006, this did not happen and she was away from the show for more than six years. Sharon finally returned to Walford in August 2012 after her six-year-old son, Dennis Rickman Jnr (born in July 2006) was kidnapped. After she had rescued him, she moved to Albert Square to help her lifelong friend Ian Beale who was suffering a mental breakdown. Two years into her return, Sharon discovered that Phil, her fiancé, ordered an attack on her bar, the Albert, that saw her hospitalised and suffering from anxiety for many months. Sharon then plotted with one of the Mitchells' old adversaries, crooked solicitor Marcus Christie, to bring down Phil and the Mitchell empire.

== Family tree ==
- Dennis Watts (deceased)
  - Den Watts (deceased), married to Angie Watts (deceased) and Chrissie Watts
    - Sharon Watts, daughter of Carol Hanley (deceased) and Gavin Sullivan (deceased), adopted by Den and Angie; married to Grant Mitchell, Dennis Rickman (deceased), Phil Mitchell and Ian Beale
      - Albie Watts, son of Sharon and Phil
    - Dennis Rickman (deceased), son of Den and Paula Rickman (deceased); married to Sharon
      - Dennis Rickman Jnr (deceased), son of Dennis and Sharon, adoptive son of Phil
        - Alyssa Lennox, daughter of Dennis and Jada Lennox
    - Vicki Fowler, daughter of Den and Michelle Fowler

== The family dynamic ==
"The Den story is actually all about family being very complicated these days. It is about him searching for his roots, his identity, his family."

— Mal Young, BBC Controller of Continuing Drama Series, 2003.

The Watts family have long been portrayed notably fractured family; it is a condition that has made them strong-willed, independent, yet also volatile and vulnerable (especially to each other). Unlike most of the other main families in EastEnders, the Watts have each spent many years of their lives without the comfort of a traditional family, and are deliberately represented as highly individualized characters who are yet in need of, and searching for, that sense of family which seems so elusive to them.

For Vicki and Dennis, they are looking for the absent father figure; for Angie and Chrissie it is reflected in their desire to be loved by Den as they love him; Sharon longs for the calm, stable family she never knew as a child, having first been given up for adoption as a toddler by her biological mother, and then being adopted by a constantly warring married couple who finally went their separate ways. Den wants the perfect family – but only on his terms. He does his best to love his family but at the same time does not fully understand what love is. The story of the Watts family is largely that of a man who is easy to love and yet just as easy to hate, and the impact this has on those closest to him.

=== Den ===
The Watts family centre on the figure of Den, who for decades has cast a strong shadow over the family even during his long absence and after his death. All members have a direct tie to him as either offspring or spouses, and it is their relationship to him that often colours their relationship to each other and also to themselves. His first wife, Angie, was driven to alcoholism because of his many affairs during nearly 20 years of marriage, whilst the relationship between Sharon and Dennis was greatly hindered by the strong personality of their disapproving father. Dennis in particular was greatly affected by his love–hate relationship with Den, who was unable to be the father he always wanted.

The Watts family, Christmas 2004. The episode, "reprised the trick that once recorded soap's biggest ever ratings by gathering the Watts family for a festive row in the Queen Victoria pub."

Much of the drama in the Watts household centres on responses to Den's selfish actions and manipulative ways. Angie constantly tried to play games and tricks in the hopes of securing Den's affections or arousing his jealousy, and later the strife between Sharon and Dennis directly resulted from Den's manipulation and Machiavellian family politics. In late 2004, when Sharon and Dennis planned to elope behind their father's back on Christmas Day, Den learned the truth and tried to force Dennis into leaving Sharon and staying with his girlfriend, Zoe Slater. Den manipulated Zoe into pretending she was pregnant by Dennis, declaring: "He's going nowhere and neither is Sharon. I didn't come back to Walford to be alone." Indeed, no one knew how to play games like Den, as pretenders like Phil Mitchell found out. As a consequence of this, Dennis seemed never quite sure what he was to Den, and even Vicki ultimately found out how little she could mean to him. Only Chrissie could play Den at his own game and keep up with his conniving, something intended by writers to be a deliberate feature of their marriage, and a quality Den openly found attractive in her: "I know we've got a great relationship even when we're tearing lumps out of each other, you give as good as you get and that's the sort of marriage I've always wanted".

=== The two Mrs Wattses ===
Although Den's first and second wives only appeared on-screen for a combined total of less than five years (Angie from 1985 to 1988; Chrissie from 2004 to 2005), they had an immense impact on the show and on the Watts family. Dealing with the antics of Den, his womanising and manipulation, was a perpetual source of drama for the two women and the show's audience. The relationship between husband and wife also provided an opportunity for writers to directly explore the familial implications of the complex Watts dynamic. As a teenager, Sharon was often seen to bemoan the marital discord between her adoptive parents, which by the time she was a teenager caused her to flee to the Fowlers which she came to see as a second home. Later, Dennis, Sharon, and Vicki berated Den for his treatment of Chrissie, especially his affair with Kate Mitchell. The revelation was particularly upsetting to Vicki, who viewed Chrissie as a mother-figure, but Sharon and Dennis were also dismayed at Den's inability to deal honestly with his wife.

As adopted mother and stepmother, both Angie and Chrissie were fiercely protective of their charges. Angie often showed concern over the effects her rows with Den had on Sharon, whilst Chrissie actively took on the role of mother to Vicki, helping her apply to art college and watching over her romantic relationships, as her real mother was in the USA. Yet motherliness was never strongly delineated in the characterisations of either Angie or Chrissie, unlike figures such as Pauline Fowler, Peggy Mitchell, or Rosa di Marco, who primarily saw themselves as mothers and were cast in that mould. Hence, whilst Angie expressed regret over Sharon's predicament – being caught between warring parents – she was not above using Sharon to score points against her husband. Similarly, although Chrissie had come to love her stepchildren, as she declared during their Christmas meal in 2004, and sympathised with the difficulties they had with their father, she could also use them in her schemes against Den, particularly his "princess", Sharon. Speaking of Den's first wife, the show's creators wrote that she saw Sharon "as something of a rival", a sentiment that became even more pronounced for Den's second wife.

Rather, both Angie and Chrissie were highly individual and volatile figures, dominated by their relationship to Den. Angie's need to be loved by Den often led her to extreme action, at one time attempting to commit suicide and later pretending to have a terminal illness. In trying to play games with Den, as he did with her, she failed, ultimately leading her to take solace in drink. Angie did manage to get some revenge on Den during the year of their separation, where Angie's absence from the Vic caused business to struggle for Den with lack of customer support. But years of alcohol abuse got the better of her by the end and she nearly died in early 1988 as a result of kidney failure. Despite his ill treatment of Angie, Den did suffer with guilt for what his actions drove his wife to do, as viewers saw years later when he helped a desperate Lisa Fowler, who was close to going down the same path as Angie did. It should also be noted that Den continued to carry a picture of Angie in his wallet along with one of Sharon, despite having his wallet lost before his exit in 1989. Unlike Angie, Chrissie was as intelligent and manipulative as Den, as he would come to fatally realise when she destroyed him through Sharon – his only weakness. Although Den bore affection for both Angie (as he found out when he began to miss her in 1987, calling her his 'one in a million') and Chrissie (going so far as to wanting to renew their wedding vows) it was only Sharon that he ever loved unconditionally.

=== Sharon ===
It is the relationship between Den and his "princess" that is the central dynamic of the Watts family. Even during the years when he was absent from her life (and supposedly dead) he remained a fixture in Sharon's life. Indeed, Sharon was the only person who truly viewed Den in a softened light, and certainly she did not seem to see him in the way that Angie, Chrissie or Dennis did – something which became a source of contention between Sharon and Dennis, the latter seeing more plainly the darker, manipulative side to Den.

== The Queen Vic ==
Chrissie brandishes The Queen Vic licence now back in Den's hands (2004).

Inextricably linked to the Watts family, since the 1970s, is The Queen Victoria pub. It is, in many ways, the family's ancestral home and the site of their most memorable events - the pub which Den and Angie ran together for more than a decade, where they raised Sharon, and to which Den returned with his second wife Chrissie. For Sharon, it was her home for most of her childhood and early adult life, and where "her roots" lie; the place most strongly associated with her father and mother.

For many viewers and fans, the Vic is synonymous with the Watts family; in particular Den, Angie, Chrissie, and Sharon, and Den and Angie often remain its most favoured landlords. Indeed, such is the strong association between the Vic and Den that it was constantly and prematurely reported in the media of his imminent return to ownership, and upon his death he vowed: "You'll never get me out of the Vic!" With the exception of Vicki, Dennis Jnr and Albie, all the Watts family have now served behind the bar of the Vic, with Den, Angie, Sharon, and Chrissie all at one time or another landlords of the pub.

The link between the Watts family and The Queen Vic is reinforced by the fact that only two other families have owned the pub in EastEnders first 25 years (apart from a brief spell in the early 1990s when it was run by Eddie Royle), and that the Watts family have secured possession on four separate occasions (Sharon in 1991, 2001 and 2020 and Den and Chrissie in 2004) in addition to their original run in-charge (1985–88). Den had sold to the pub to Frank Butcher in 1988, and Sharon's first husband Grant Mitchell had bought it for them to run together three years later. Phil, Grant's brother who eventually became Sharon's third husband, later had spells running the pub, as did his mother Peggy.

== Relationships and feuds with the Mitchells ==
One of the most prominent aspects of EastEnders over the years has been the relationships and more so the conflict between the Watts family and another prominent and long-standing family - the Mitchells. This even became the subject of a special EastEnders Revealed, entitled "Blood Feud: The Watts vs. The Mitchells". The familial contention is rooted in Sharon's tempestuous relationship with the Mitchell brothers Grant (Ross Kemp) and Phil (Steve McFadden), which began after Den's disappearance and the departure of Angie. After the breakdown of her marriage to Grant, Sharon's position became untenable: Grant was capable of violence towards her, and his loud-mouth mother Peggy (Barbara Windsor) was constantly hounding her. Sharon left Walford in 1995, and the Mitchells took over The Queen Vic.

The importance of the Vic to the Watts family became obvious again in 2001, when Sharon returned to Walford and bought the pub after a six-year absence. Indeed, the Vic was to become a central battlefield in the war between the contending families: the returning Watts family seeking to reclaim what now belonged to the Mitchells. Even when Sharon sold the pub back to the Mitchell family the following year, the rivalry with Phil, Peggy, and Sam Mitchell (Kim Medcalf) heated up with the appearance of Sharon's half-sister Vicki and Den's long-lost son, Dennis, who particularly clashed against Phil Mitchell after punching him when they first met.

The return of Den (after 14 years) took the conflict between the two families to another level. Den threatened Phil's position as top dog and quickly became Phil's "arch enemy", whilst Den developed a hatred for Phil upon learning of the rivalry between Dennis and Phil, and of the way the Mitchells had treated his "princess", Sharon. In late 2003, Den successfully framed Phil for armed robbery, enabling Lisa Fowler (Lucy Benjamin), the estranged mother of Phil's daughter, Louise, to flee the country with their child. Phil had completely underestimated Den who quickly put the great Mitchell family in their place. However, Phil broke out of prison before Christmas and briefly returned to Albert Square to confront Den, but the pair called a truce and Den let Phil go after handing over the proceeds of their armed robbery.

Soon after, Den was joined by his second wife Chrissie, and the pair proceeded to bring down the whole Mitchell financial empire, bankrupting the family in a scam and retaking control of the Vic. In an episode airing soon after Den's death, Sam confronted Chrissie claiming that "the Mitchell name should be above the [Vic] door; you know it and I know it!" to which Chrissie replied: "Not while I've got breath in my body", chucking Sam out of the pub and firing her.

In August 2012, Sharon sought out Phil's help after her son Dennis (Harry Hickles) had been kidnapped by her fiancé John Hewland (Jesse Birdsall). Phil's family fell apart when it was discovered that his teenage son, Ben (Joshua Pascoe), had killed Heather Trott (Cheryl Fergison) and in an attempt to rebuild his family and win custody of his granddaughter Lexi Pearce, Sharon has agreed to help Phil by faking an engagement between the two.

In November 2015, Gavin Sullivan (Paul Nicholas) revealed that both he and Den Watts were in a gang with Eric Mitchell during the 1960s when they were growing up together in Walford. It was membership of the gang that led Gavin to give Den to Sharon. However, fans criticised this as an example of retconning because Den claimed to know nothing about the Mitchells when he returned to Walford in 2003 and Ted Hills (who was also mentioned as another gang member) also did not know the Mitchells and was not friendly with Den at the time. Gavin was first mentioned in 2006 when a 10-year-old Ben returned to Walford after the supposed death of his mother Kathy Beale (Gillian Taylforth) in a car crash in South Africa, along with Gavin, his stepfather. Ben is the son of Phil and the much younger half-brother of Ian Beale (Adam Woodyatt). In 2015, however, it was revealed that Kathy and Gavin were in fact still alive.

== Other family connections ==
The Watts family are closely connected to the Fowlers and Beales through friendship as well as marital relationships. The Fowler family was a second home for Sharon growing up, her best friend being Michelle Fowler. Indeed, the connection between the two families resulted in the affair between Den and Michelle, which in turn produced Vicki Fowler. Later, Pauline Fowler and Chrissie bonded (to an extent) over their desire to look out for Vicki, and indeed Chrissie would do Pauline the honour of killing Den with her doorstop. Pauline had despised Den for years, although they did manage to achieve something of a truce just before Den's death. Pauline's twin brother Pete Beale, in contrast, was Den's best friend for many years.

Angie was close friends with both Pat Butcher and Kathy Beale, who had both been married to Pete. Sharon was a girlfriend of Ian Beale when they were in their mid teens, and they remain very close friends. Den was also the godfather of Bobby Beale, Ian's youngest son. Bobby also befriended Sharon's son Dennis Rickman Jnr, who was also close to Bobby's father, calling him 'Uncle Ian.' Den and Angie also were very close to Pauline and Arthur, Angie was the godmother of Martin Fowler (though relations between Pauline and Den turned sour after she found out that Den was the father of Vicki Fowler). Sharon is also best friends with Michelle Fowler and was also very close to Mark Fowler.

In August 2012, Sharon returned to Walford with Dennis Jnr and became instantly involved with the prominent Branning family; she shared a flirtatious relationship with Jack and soon befriended his brother Max and ultimately his partner Tanya Cross, whom she initially feuded. Dennis also attended school with and befriended Max and Tanya's son, Oscar Branning.

== Reception ==
Throughout their years on-screen, the members of the Watts family have been involved in many of EastEnders major storylines, particularly those involving high levels of drama and tragedy. Indeed, many of the biggest and most significant storylines produced by show have focused around them: Den and Angie's tempestuous relationship; Sharon's affair with Phil Mitchell and later her illicit love for Dennis; and Chrissie's manipulation and scheming are all high-points of the programme's history. Similarly, the Watts family have produced many of EastEnders most memorable moments, including Den divorcing Angie (in the 1986 Christmas Day episode, which was watched by more than half of the British population), the returns of Sharon and Den, and Chrissie killing Den. Although largely few in number, they are among the most iconic figures of the show, and are responsible for its biggest ratings.

When EastEnders began in 1985, the soap focused primarily around the affairs of three families: the Beales, Fowlers, and Watts. However, much of the show's early success stemmed from the drama surrounding the Watts, especially the antics of Den, who as owners of the Queen Vic pub (the show's most prominent set) were usually in the limelight. This prominence, at a time when EastEnders was at its most prolific in terms of both the media and audience, meant the Watts family became perhaps EastEnders most eminent family and the characters recognisable even to those who did not normally watch the show. Such was their success that producers went ahead with an experimental episode format centring on just Den and Angie, during which Angie lied about having cancer; so successful was the airing that it has since been repeated, and the format expanded to include "three" and "four-handers" (between 3 and 4 characters). Such episodes are highly prestigious and feature only the most popular and prominent characters in the show; thus, all the Watts, aside from Vicki, have featured in such episodes.

The 1986 Christmas Day episode during which Den delivered Angie divorce papers is the highest rated airing of any British soap in television history, with more than 30 million viewers tuning in - over half of the British population. Den and Angie became perennial favourites of audiences, with many fearing EastEnders would not survive their departures. However, the popularity of their daughter, Sharon, helped keep the show popular and herald in a new era of the show when her involvement in a love-triangle with the Mitchell brothers became must-see TV between 1992 and 1995 - while other characters including the Mitchell family (introduced in 1990) helped keep audiences interested, as did the members of the established families including the Beales and Fowlers. As The Guardian media critic mused six years later:

It wasn't so much the guilt-stacked, long-drawn-out business of Sharon 'n' Phil's helpless lust for each other – all that unseemly face-sucking while her hubby/his brother, the ape-like Grant, languished in gaol for trying to set fire to everyone – that broke the ratings record, nor was it the ingenious ruse of using the baby's alarm system to broadcast Sharon's poignant little confession to the entire clientele of Walford's Queen Vic. It was the fact that we'd all watched Sharon grow up... vulnerable, brave, sweet-natured and kind to the dog. We were sorry for her because not only had her mother given her away, but her adoptive parents were the legendary Dirty Den and the feckless Angie, erstwhile landlord and lady of the Queen Vic, who were always too busy being dirty and feckless, in our opinion, to take proper care of their little girl.

The return of Sharon in May 2001 became a seminal moment for the show, eclipsed only by the intense media scrutiny surrounding Den's return two years later. Den's return provided EastEnders with a ratings boost, attracting a 'whooping' 62% of the television audience. Indeed, storylines involving the Watts family proved so popular with viewers, that over 17 million people tuned in on 18 February 2005 to see Chrissie kill Dirty Den in revenge for his latest round of adultery and other schemes. The storyline of Den's death and the scheming aftermath which led to the arrest of Chrissie dominated the show for 2005, being popular among viewers, and winning best soap storyline and ensured the show won Best Soap at the Inside Soap Awards.

However, the Watts family have also received criticism from the press and viewers. In particular, although Den's return was meant to crystallise the return of the Watts family, many felt his re-introduction affected credibility (even though the scene had been set at the time of Den's 1989 exit for a possible return in the future), with Diederick Santer, executive producer of EastEnders after the Watts family gradually departed, saying that it "damaged the show". Grantham's off-screen antics also affected the soap's profile, with tabloids like The Daily Mirror predicting the end of the show and blaming Den's return for its demise. Many in the media were also critical of Mal Young, who was a strong supporter of the Watts family, arguing his overly-melodramatic and popularising tastes alienated viewers and especially the media. The sensationalist relationship between Sharon and Dennis was seen to epitomise the tone of the show at the time.

== See also ==
- The Queen Victoria
- Sharongate
