= Nabil Elouahabi =

British actor (born 1975)

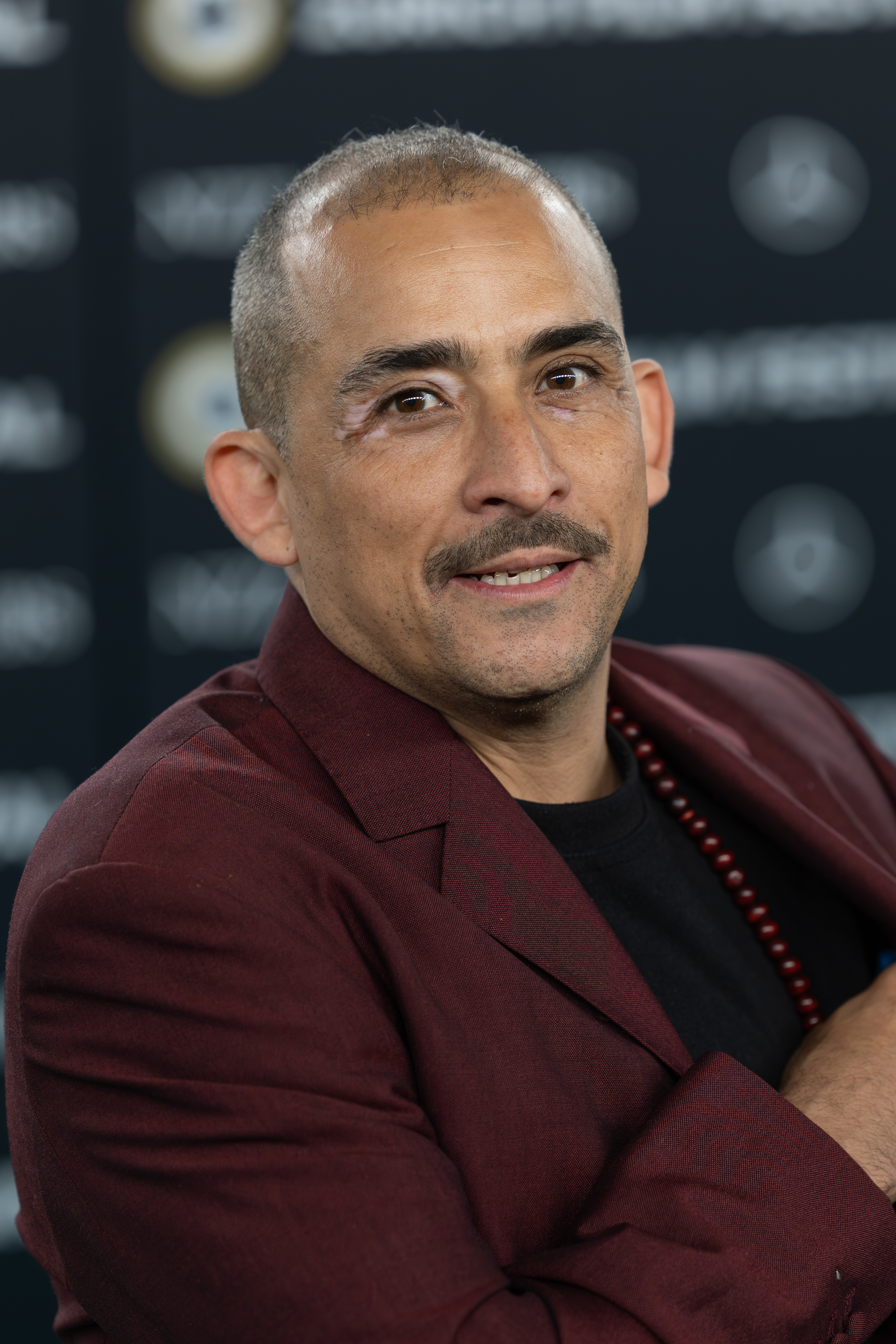
- Nabil Elouahabi on the Green Carpet at the 2025 Zurich Film Festival.
- Born: 6 February 1975 (age 51)
- Occupation: Actor
- Notable work: Only Fools and Horses; EastEnders

Nabil Elouahabi (born 6 February 1975), often credited as Nabil Elouhabi, is a British-Moroccan actor, known for his role as Tariq Larousi in EastEnders from 2003 to 2005, as Rashid "Gary" Mahmoon in "Strangers on the Shore" (the 2002 Christmas Special of Only Fools and Horses) and as Mr. Mustapha in the Netflix series Top Boy in 2011 and 2013.

== Career ==
Nabil made his acting debut in an episode of the BBC medical drama series Casualty in 1998. He went on to have roles in several television series such as Attachments, Only Fools and Horses and In This World. He also appeared in films such as Ali G Indahouse (2002) and The Sum of All Fears (2002). In 2003 he won the role of Tariq Larousi in the BBC soap opera EastEnders. In 2005 he was axed from the soap after his character, along with his on-screen family, the Ferreiras, proved to be unpopular with audiences.

Since leaving EastEnders he has appeared in Holby City and has played real-life terrorist Ramzi Yousef in the television mini-series The Path to 9/11. In 2008 he played Meesh, a Kuwaiti translator, in HBO's Generation Kill.

Most recently Nabil played Dean Andrews on Breeders; he also appeared in the three-part Jimmy McGovern drama series Time on BBC One. On 16 January 2022, Elouahabi appeared in Vera in the episode "As the Crow Flies" in the role of Mo Hassan.

In 2023, Elouahabi featured as Joseph in the BBC series, Blue Lights.

== Filmography ==
=== Film ===
Year	Title	Role	Notes
2002	Ali G Indahouse	Jezzy F	
2002	Deserter	Abdel Kadar	
2002	The Sum of All Fears	Ghazi	
2002	In This World	Yusif (Europe)	
2003	Asylum	Mahmoud Nasdar	
2003	Code 46	Vendor	
2005	Plato's Breaking Point		
2007	The Boat People	Jared	
2009	Journey to Mecca	Hamza	
2011	Blitz	Witness	
2011	Junkhearts	Fisherman	
2012	Tower Block	Gary	
2012	Zero Dark Thirty	Detainee on Monitor	
2015	Hyena Road	Haji Baba / The Cleaner	
2015	Rise of the Footsoldier: Part II	Demirkan	
2016	Worst Fears	Karim	
2017	Sand Castle	Arif	
2017	Undocument	Sami	
2021	Infinite	O Dog	
2024	The Outrun	Samir	

=== Television ===
Year	Title	Role	Notes
1996	The Bill	Karim Bakri	Episode: "Nice Boy"
1998–2017	Casualty	Various roles	3 episodes
1999	London's Burning	Arabic Boy	Episode #11.16
2002	Attachments	Kev	Episode: "Tooting Broadway"
2002	Only Fools and Horses	Rashid Mahmoon aka Gary	Episode: "Strangers on the Shore...!"
2003–2005	EastEnders	Tariq	165 episodes
2004	Keen Eddie	Sunglasses	Episode: "Keeping Up Appearances"
2006	Holby City	Seb Carter	Episode: "Looking After Number One"
2006	The Path to 9/11	Ramzi Yousef	2 episodes
2008	Generation Kill	Meesh	7 episodes
2009	Law & Order: UK	Nazim Kasaba	Episode: "Paradise"
2010	Strike Back	Massoud	Episode: "Iraq: Part One"
2011	The Boarding School Bomber	Taxi Driver	Television film
2013	Mad Dogs	Halim	Episode #3.1
2013	Top Boy	Mr. Mustapha	4 episodes
2014	24	Mick	Episode: "Day 9: 12:00 p.m.-1:00 p.m."
2016	The Night Of	Yusuf	4 episodes
2016	The Missing	Mirza Barzani	Episode: "Statice"
2018	Deep State	Hassan Nassor	2 episodes
2018	Thunderbirds Are Go	Professor Karim	Episode: "Life Signs"
2019	His Dark Materials	The Bright-Eyed Man	2 episodes
2020	Our Girl	Rabee	6 episodes
2021	Breeders	Dean	Episode: "No Friends"
2021	Time	P.O. Patterson	2 episodes
2021	The Tower	Younes Mehenni	2 episodes
2021	Vera	Mo Hassan	Episode: "S11:E4" "As the Crow Flies"
2022	Trigger Point	Hassan Rahim	Episode: "Series 2 & 3"
2023	Blue Lights	Joseph	5 episodes
2024	FBI: International	Abood	Episode: “S3:E2”

=== Video games ===
Year	Title	Role
2014	Dragon Age: Inquisition	Additional voices
2020	Valorant	Cypher (Amir El Amari)
2022	Elden Ring	Merchant Kale
