= Robyn Moore (British actress) =

British actress

Robyn Moore is a British actress of Belgian and Polish origin, best known for playing Shirley Benson in EastEnders from 2003 to 2004.

Moore has also appeared in Agatha Christie's Poirot, Family Affairs, The Bill and Doctors.

In November 2008, she began a month-long run at the White Bear Theatre in Kennington, in the new Australian play The Ides of March.
