= Keen Eddie =

American action, comedy-drama television series

- Genre: Police procedural Comedy drama
- Created by: J. H. Wyman
- Starring: Mark Valley; Sienna Miller; Julian Rhind-Tutt; Colin Salmon
- Country of origin: United States
- Original language: English
- No. of seasons: 1
- No. of episodes: 13

Production
- Executive producers: J. H. Wyman; Warren Littlefield; Simon West
- Production locations: London, England, United Kingdom
- Cinematography: Martin Kenzie
- Editors: Jamie Pearson; Tim Marchant; T. G. Herrington; Glen Scantlebury; Sarah Brewerton; Nigel Bunyan
- Running time: 44 minutes
- Production companies: Frequency Films; Simon West Productions; The Littlefield Company; Paramount Network Television

Original release
- Network: Fox
- Release: June 3, 2003 – April 14, 2004

Keen Eddie is an American comedy-drama police procedural television series that aired on Fox from June 3 to July 24, 2003. The series was originally scheduled to premiere during the 2002–03 television season, but was postponed and premiered as a summer replacement in June 2003. Fox canceled the series, pulling it from the schedule after airing seven episodes. The remaining six episodes debuted on the American cable network Bravo and began airing in January 2004.

The series follows a brash NYPD detective who goes to London when one of his cases goes sour and remains to work with New Scotland Yard. The soundtrack and incidental music for the first episode was provided by British techno duo Orbital. Daniel Ash of rock band Love and Rockets scored the rest of the series.

All thirteen episodes of the series were released on DVD by Paramount Home Entertainment on September 7, 2004; however, some of the music was replaced for the DVD release.

== Plot ==
After his investigation into an oxycodone ring results in a botched drug bust, NYPD Detective Eddie Arlette is sent to London to assist Scotland Yard with its work on the same case. Eddie and his British police partner, Inspector Monty Pippin, help crack the case, and Eddie is asked to stay on at Scotland Yard. He initially declines but suddenly changes his mind to the surprise of those around him.

In addition to his work, Eddie has an adversarial but flirtatious relationship with Fiona, who occupies the flat he is renting from her parents; she begrudgingly puts up with him (and his Bull Terrier, Pete), because he has threatened to reveal to her parents that she is not actually enrolled at university. Eddie frequently tries to make Fiona question her relationship with her boyfriend, Nigel. It is possible that he would like them to break up so he might be able to date Fiona. In the final episodes of the series, Eddie and Fiona seem to be forming a deeper connection with each other, while still maintaining their teasing relationship. In the final episode, it is predicted that Eddie will fall in love with a woman on a red bus. In the last moments of the episode, Eddie sees Fiona get off a red bus. He clearly notices this fact but chooses not to tell Fiona.

Eddie's other influential relationship, while in England, is with his friend and co-worker Monty Pippin. On his first day in London, Pippin takes Eddie to a swingers club. Pippin explains that he is not actually married but he and a friend pretend to be, so they can take part in the club. Pippin has many other strange sexual habits. In one episode, Pippin joins a support group for "sexaholics" (nymphomaniacs) but tells the group his name is Eddie Arlett. He also drops his English accent and takes on an American one. He never takes the support group seriously and promptly attempts to seduce one of his group members. While Eddie puts up with Pippin's antics, he frequently tries to encourage Pippin to change. Eddie also states that Pippin's personality is not natural as everything Pippin does contradicts something he did previously.

Eddie also has a flirtatious, albeit a seemingly imaginary, relationship with Carol Ross (Superintendent Nathanial Johnson's assistant), whom he calls "Ms. Moneypenny" and with whom he banters using double entendres. When he asks her seemingly innocent questions, she gives a sexual reply ("How are you, Miss Moneypenny?" "Completely...shaved." or "What's new, Miss Moneypenny?" "Crotchless panties." or "What's your position, Miss Moneypenny?" "On...all...fours."). Eddie frequently asks those around him if they heard her response. Except for a single incident in the episode Keeping Up Appearances, no one ever appears to have heard her sexual response but simply hear a neutral comment (when he asks her how she's doing, he hears her say "Terribly horny", but anyone he asks heard "Terribly well").

Eddie's dog Pete is extremely ill-tempered. Eddie attempts to leave him in quarantine at the airport when he arrives in England but Pippin rescues Pete, by claiming Pete is a police dog. Pete chews on everything and frequently destroys TV remote controls and cellphones. He also has strange sexual appetites, from Fiona's cat Princess to a fur coat to sleeping humans. More than once, he has aggressively cornered visitors at the apartment and forced them to stand motionless for hours until Fiona or Eddie come home.

Eddie also has a catchphrase when introduced to a villain or upon making an arrest: "Hi, I'm Eddie...how do you like me so far?"

== Cast ==
=== Main ===
The main cast of Keen Eddie

- Mark Valley as Detective Eddie Arlette, NYPD
- Sienna Miller as Fiona Bickerton
- Julian Rhind-Tutt as Inspector Monty Pippin, New Scotland Yard
- Colin Salmon as Superintendent Nathanial Johnson, New Scotland Yard

=== Recurring ===
- Alexei Sayle as Rudy Alexander
- Rachael Buckley as Carol Ross A.K.A. "Miss Moneypenny"
- Theo Fraser Steele as Nigel
- Sophie Hunter as Lois
- Daniel Goldenberg as Johnny Red
- Alex McSweeney as One Ball Bill
- Sarah-Jane Potts as Audry
- Ivana Horvat as Milli
- Anya Lahiri as Zoe
- Meredith Ostrom as Dominique
- Sarah Vandenberg as Valentine Hughes
- Martin Hancock as Fishy
- Nick Malinowski as Cheap Trick

== Episodes ==
Paramount opted to put the episodes in the order they were aired, not produced, for the DVD release. The most notable evidence of this is Eddie’s map of London, where he tacks a matchbook relating to his adventure, as well as Nigel's re-appearance after he's moved abroad. The number of matchbooks noticeably fluctuates when watched in broadcast order. The episode list below is ordered by their production numbers and not their air dates. The DVD release also replaces the music that was originally used when the show was originally broadcast.

No.	Title	Directed by	Written by	Original release date	Prod. code	U.S. viewers (millions)
1	"Pilot (a.k.a. Eddie)"	Simon West	J. H. Wyman	June 3, 2003	101	7.6
NYPD detective Eddie Arlette finds himself with a one-way ticket to London after botching an operation to catch an oxycodone ring. Under the watchful eye of DI Monty Pippin, Arlette resumes his investigation by using former suspect Rudy Alexander as informant to work his way to the top of the chain.
2	"Horse Heir"	Simon West	Andi Bushell & Jim Praytor and J. H. Wyman	June 10, 2003	102	5.0
Eddie and Monty investigate the theft of a prize racehorse stolen for the purpose of sperm extraction. With the help of sparring half-brothers "One Ball" Bill and "Gay" Johnny, they discover that criminal kingpin 'Yellow' is behind the theft, and plan a sting to catch him red handed.
3	"Keeping Up Appearances"	Paul Shapiro	J. H. Wyman	April 7, 2004	103	N/A
Eddie inherits a Bentley and personal driver from an eccentric millionaire, but finds the car to be more trouble than it's worth when the millionaire's estranged son continually steals it.
4	"Citizen Cecil"	Tony Bill	Jeff Vlaming	March 2, 2004	104	N/A
Eddie must track down a violent criminal who has left a path of destruction throughout London as he attempts to track down some stolen football tickets.
5	"Who Wants to Be in a Club That Would Have Me as a Member?"	Bryan Spicer	Steven Kane	March 24, 2004	105	N/A
Eddie investigates a hazing at a private school.
6	"Sucker Punch"	Jefery Levy	Robert Palm and J. H. Wyman	July 1, 2003	106	N/A
Eddie investigate an illegal fight club.
7	"Black Like Me"	David Jones	Richard Dresser and J. H. Wyman	July 24, 2003	107	3.4
Eddie investigates a fatal robbery where a jewelry story employee was killed.
8	"Inciting Incident"	Michael Engler	Jeff Vlaming	February 17, 2004	108	N/A
A train collision results after a railroad employee is distracted when his wife calls him about photos she received that show him involved with another woman.
9	"Achtung Baby"	Charles McDougall	Robert Palm and J. H. Wyman	June 17, 2003	109	4.9
Eddie protects an opera singer from Germany who is being stalked by an assassin.
10	"The Amazing Larry Dunn"	Tim Van Patten	J. H. Wyman	July 8, 2003	110	4.1
Burglers need a manual to crack a safe, but the person who has it can't remember where he put it.
11	"Sticky Fingers"	Alan Taylor	Story by : Jib Polhemus; Teleplay by : Willie Reale	January 27, 2004	111	N/A
A pickpocket is concerned his son is headed down the wrong path.
12	"Eddie Loves Baseball"	Nick Gomez	Steven Kane and J. H. Wyman	June 24, 2003	112	5.0
A gang of gamblers kidnaps the daughter of a football/soccer player to coerce him into throwing a game.
13	"Liberté, Egalité, Fraternité"	Leslie Libman	Richard Dresser and J. H. Wyman	April 14, 2004	113	N/A
A search for a lost wallet places Eddie into conflict with a French crime kingpin and his associates.
