= Raji James =

British actor

- Born: Rajesh Kumar Jhanji; 24 February 1970 (age 56); Havant, Hampshire, England
- Education: Royal Welsh College of Music & Drama
- Occupation: Actor
- Years active: 1988–present
- Spouse: Jo Jhanji (m. 2010)
- Children: 2

Rajesh Kumar Jhanji (born 24 February 1970), known professionally as Raji James, is a British actor, known for his roles as Ash Ferreira in EastEnders, DS Vik Singh in The Bill and Ali Shahzad in Hollyoaks. He also played Abdul Khan in the 1999 film East Is East. From 2007 to 2008, he starred in The Ray Peacock Podcast.

== Career ==
James has featured as regular characters in ITV's The Bill (as DS Vik Singh, 2000–2002) and the BBC's EastEnders (as Ash Ferreira, 2003–2005). He has also had guest star roles in Crocodile Shoes, Waking the Dead and in the 2006 Doctor Who episodes "Army of Ghosts" and "Doomsday". He went on to appear as Prince Malik in the 2006 BBC adaptation of Robin Hood (episode 10 - Peace? Off!), and starred as Dr Joe Mangeshkar in the thirteen part Australian TV series Kick (2007). Additional lead guest roles include Waking the Dead, Murder in Mind, Casualty, Holby City and Doctors, Coupling, The Knock, Doomwatch, and Heaven on Earth as well as another series lead role in HTV’s Nuts and Bolts (2002). Most recently he played a recurring role in Coronation Street (2019). From September 2021, James has portrayed the role of Ali Shahzad in the Channel 4 soap opera Hollyoaks. In film, James played Abdul Khan in East Is East (1999). He also appeared as Anil in Provoked – a true story (2006) and Sanjay Khanna in Nina’s Heavenly Delights (2006).

== Personal life ==
James grew up in the Portsmouth suburb of Paulsgrove, attending what was at the time City of Portsmouth Boys Comprehensive, later attending Portsmouth College. James went on to attend the Royal Welsh College of Music & Drama. In 2007, he started a club night, VIP Ramp, with EastEnders co-star Ameet Chana.
