= Jemma Walker =

English actress

- Born: Essex, England
- Occupation: Actress
- Years active: 1998–present

Jemma Walker is an English actress, known for portraying Siobhan Jones Callan in Family Affairs and Sasha Perkins in EastEnders.

== Background ==
Born in Essex, Walker was a dancer until the age of sixteen. She studied for a Drama BTEC at Barking College, and went on to train at the Arts Educational School in Chiswick.

== Career ==
Walker played barmaid Siobhan Jones Callan in Family Affairs for four years, before joining EastEnders as former escort Sasha Perkins. Discussing the two roles, she said:

"In Family Affairs, my character...was down and victimised, and trying to kill herself, so after four years of misery it was a lovely chance to play a lighter character. There were moments where it wasn't all hunky dory, but at the time there were lots of depressing and meaningful storylines going on, so it was nice to offer some light relief!"

On television, Walker has also appeared in episodes of The Bill, Doctors, Hotel Babylon and Jonathan Creek. Her film credits include EMR (2004) and Love's Kitchen (2010).

Jemma has recently been playing the character of Mollie, a guesthouse owner, in the first UK tour of Agatha Christie's The Mousetrap. (2012)

== Filmography ==
Year	Title	Role	Notes
1998–2002	Family Affairs	Siobhan Jones Callan	Soap opera
2003	The Bill	Ella Grey: Episode #076	Police drama
2003–2005	EastEnders	Sasha Perkins	Soap opera
2004	EMR	Tracey	Feature film
2007	Doctors	Ilena Leeson: Pleasure Island	Comedy drama
2008	Hotel Babylon	Lindsay Barnes: Episode #3.2	TV series
2009	Jonathan Creek	Candy Mountains: The Grinning Man	TV series
2010	Love's Kitchen	Gemma	Feature film
2012	Casualty	Sheila Farrady	Guest Appearance
2012	Bad Education	Chantelles' Mum	TV series
2012	Vexed	Davina Hall	TV series

== Theatre ==
- Ladies' Day, Hull Truck Theatre, October 2006 (playing Shelley)
- Ladies Down Under, Hull Truck Theatre, April - May 2007 (playing Shelley)
- Market Boy, Olivier Theatre, June - August 2006, (playing Most Beautiful Girl in Romford)
- The Mousetrap - 60th Anniversary Tour - 2012 & 2013
- "The Graft" Theatre Royal Stratford East 2011
