= Mohammed George =

British actor

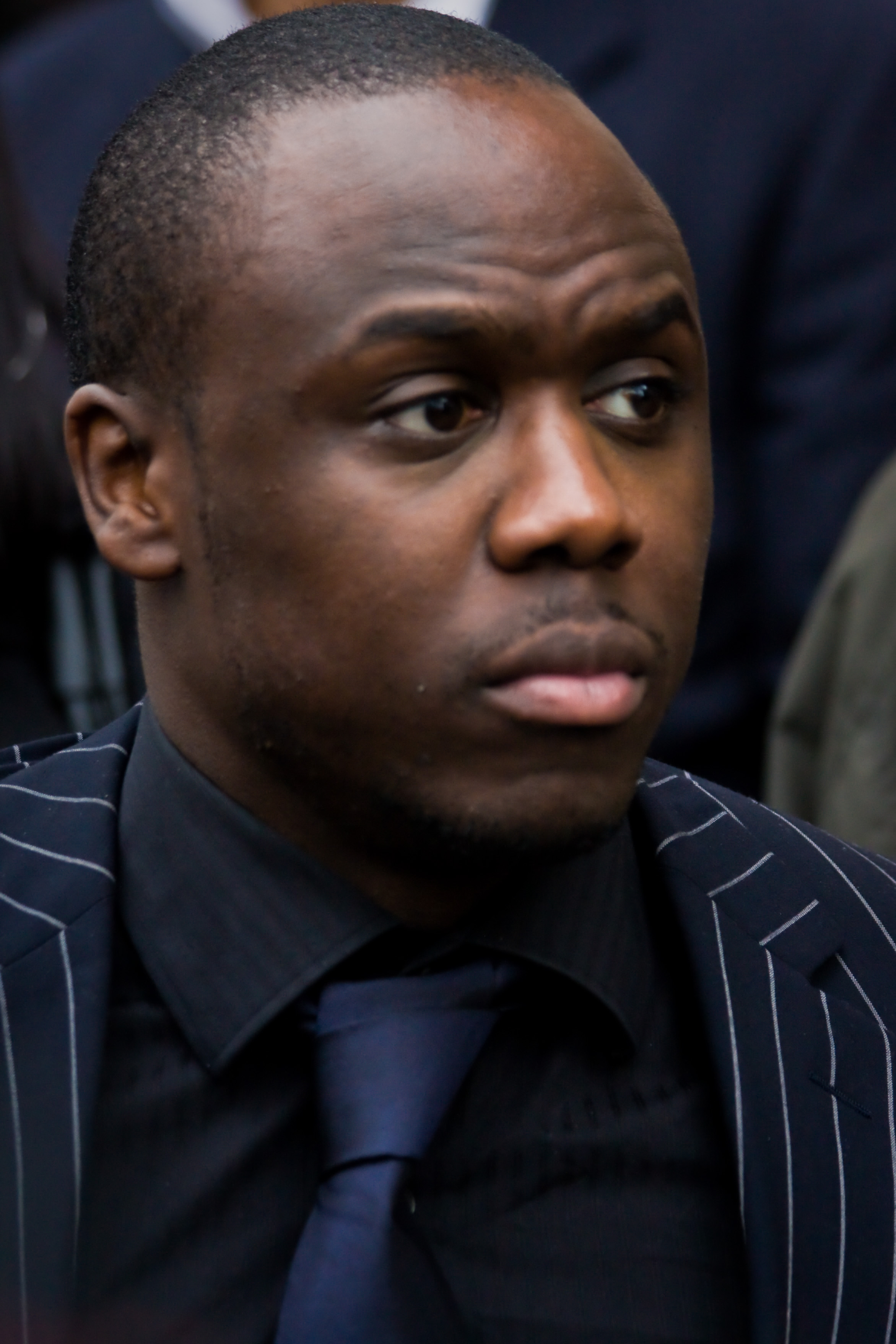
- George in 2009
- Born: Mohammed Michael George; 11 March 1982 (age 43); Hackney, London, England
- Education: Sylvia Young Theatre School
- Occupation: Actor
- Years active: 1994-present

Mohammed Michael "Mo" George (born 11 March 1982) is a British actor who played Gus Smith on the soap opera EastEnders from 2002 to 2008.

== Career ==
Before appearing in EastEnders, George made guest appearances in Holby City, Bottom (as a young trick-or-treater in the episode "Terror") and The Last Detective. He also starred as Dennis in the children's programme Renford Rejects in 2000, and had a role in the film Kidulthood.

== Personal life ==
George had a daughter, Olivia, with his former partner, Emma Archibald. The couple subsequently split, and George began raising Olivia on his own.

=== Legal troubles ===
George was arrested on 8 December 2006 for a suspected assault on girlfriend Emma Archibald during an argument outside a restaurant. She corroborated the claims, in what started as an argument over who should empty the dishwasher. George was cautioned by the police for having swung a bag of rubbish, and was subsequently suspended by EastEnders executive producer Diederick Santer for two months. George apologised to the BBC and the show's producers. It was announced on 18 January 2008 that George and EastEnders had reached a mutual agreement not to renew his contract, and he left the show after six years, later in 2008. George has since stated that he was "forced" to leave EastEnders after the bosses there believed newspaper headlines which he later proved wrong. He has admitted to suffering from depression as a result of his departure from EastEnders.

=== Lawsuits ===
In March 2009, George started libel action against The Sun newspaper, claiming that they said he was "acting like a wild animal" and branded him a "woman beater". He claimed that this was untrue. His lawyer said the reports had "damaged his prospects as an actor". The newspaper contested the claim, but George won £75,000 libel damages on 2 April 2009. In July 2010, the Daily Star apologised and paid damages to George after they incorrectly reported that he had arrived drunk to an EastEnders 25th anniversary party and acted aggressively to the programme's producers.

== Filmography ==
=== Film ===
Year	Title	Role	Notes
2002	Never Play with the Dead		
2013	Forget the Pact	Frankie	Short film
2015	Murder Capital	Reaper	Short film
2016	Remembrance Day	Kofi	Short film
2016	The Naked Poet	Martin	
2019	A Man Down	Paul Drummond	Short film
2024	Here	Winston	
TBA	Thirteen Cars	Bez	Pre-production

=== Television ===
Year	Title	Role	Notes
1995	Bottom	Small Devil	Episode: "Terror"; Credited as Mohammad George
1995	The Biz	Max	Unknown episodes
2000	The Bill	Mark Okin	Episode: "White Lies"
2000-2001	Renford Rejects	Dennis Quayle	Unknown episodes
2002	Holby City	Dean Flynn	Episode: "Birthday"
2002-2008	EastEnders	Gus Smith	Main cast 319 episodes
2003	The Last Detective	Warren	Episode: "Pilot"; Credited as Mohammad George
2007	Children in Need	Himself (performer)	Episode: "#1.28"
2011	Postcode	Rob	Television movie
2012	Crime Stories	Peter Green	Episode: "#1.19"
