= Pooja Shah =

British actress (born 1979)

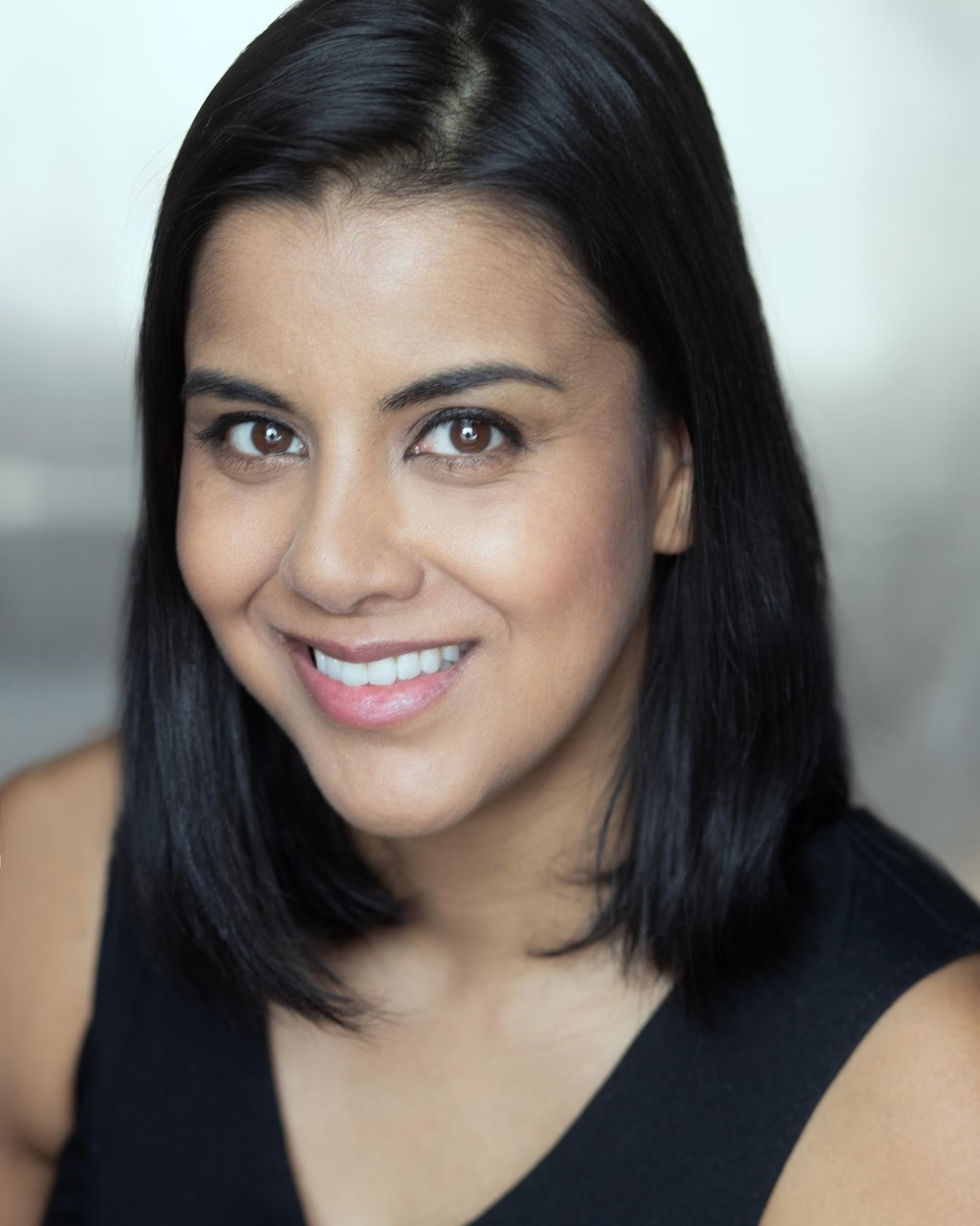
- Actress Pooja Shah
- Born: 8 August 1979 (age 47); Camden, London, England
- Occupation: Actress
- Years active: 2001–present
- Spouse: Will Middleton (2014–present)
- Children: 2

Pooja Shah (born 8 August 1979) is an English actress, filmmaker and model. She is known for her role as Kareena Ferreira in the popular UK soap opera EastEnders. Shah works with her husband directing and writing short films and has won three film awards for them.

== Early life and career ==
Pooja Shah's grandparents migrated to Kenya from Gujarat in Western India. Shah trained as an Indian classical dancer. She attended the University of Brighton, graduating in 2001 with a BA Hons Degree in Theatre with Visual Practice.

Shah began her acting career in the theatre and went on to play the lead role of Mary Magdalene in a small budget film named Jesus the Curry King. The film was produced by the Aylesbury Film Company and was one of the first digital films to be shown in cinemas in the UK.

In 2002 Shah played Meena in the film Bend It Like Beckham. Later that year she played one of the lead roles, Sinjata Kapoor, in the Sky One series Is Harry On The Boat? based on the best selling book by Colin Butts and the 2001 film. The story is about holiday reps in Ibiza and was filmed in Almunecar in Andalusia, Spain. The series was positively reviewed by The Guardian, which said that the "cast and crew threw every last drop of talent and energy into the production, making this one of the liveliest bits of youth-oriented drama this year … a sex-crazed hybrid of Baywatch and Boogie Nights."

Other credits include roles in the BBC hospital drama Holby City (2002), and the American series Adventure Inc. (2003).

In 2003 Shah was cast in her most notable role to date. She played Kareena Ferreira in the BBC soap opera EastEnders. The Ferreira family were not well received by critics or viewers and were dismissed as unrealistic by the Asian community in the UK. In 2004 the new executive producer, Kathleen Hutchison, made the decision to axe the entire family in a bid to improve the show, which had suffered from a vast ratings decline. Shah subsequently left the show in 2005.

After leaving EastEnders Shah has appeared in a short film entitled CryBaby, was a celebrity sponsor on the show Strictly Dance Fever and in September 2005 she acted in a feature film called Weekend Lovers.

Shah played the lead role, Sona Virdi, in the play Deranged Marriage, which toured the UK in 2005. In 2006, she took on a lead role in the Britflick Cash and Curry, which was released in 2008. The film also stars Ameet Chana, the actor who played her on-screen brother Adi Ferreira in EastEnders. In 2007 she played the role of Reshna Dewan in the ITV police drama The Bill.

Shah was a supporting actress in the 2009 and 2010 BBC drama Missing with lead, Pauline Quirke, and starred alongside Brendan Carr in the Modern Life? feature film Ten Dead Men produced by Phil Hobden and directed by Ross Boyask. In 2010, Shah filmed eight episodes of Coronation Street, playing DC Moore, a police officer investigating an attack on Tracy Barlow. The first episode aired on 3 January 2011.

Shah won a Best Actress award in 2010 at the Rob Knox Film Festival, for her role as Rajinda, a lesbian Indian girl about to tell her parents she is gay, just as they tell her of her arranged marriage to a man who is on his way to meet her.

In 2015, Shah appeared in Challenge idents for Wink Bingo and more recently has featured in Class (a Doctor Who spin-off) in 2016 and made another appearance in Doctors in 2017. She filmed In The Long Run (produced and starring Iris Elba) in 2019. Clients that she has undertaken corporate work for include Deloitte, Great Western Railway, Network Rail, Asda, Transport for London, Lloyds Bank and Royal Mail.

== Personal life ==
Pooja married Will Middleton in 2014. He is a director of photography. They have two children.
