= Alex McSweeney =

British actor (born 1966)

- Born: Alexander Nicholas Peter McSweeney; 20 December 1966 (age 59); Lambeth, London, England
- Education: Academy Drama School
- Occupations: Actor; writer; director
- Years active: 1994–present

Alexander Nicholas Peter McSweeney (born 20 December 1966) is an English actor, writer and director, best known for playing Graham Foster in EastEnders from 2003 to 2005, and again in 2023. Other programmes he has appeared in include Silent Witness and Holby City. He also appeared in Lewis, in 2007. He has also portrayed 'Captain Wilder' in the third series of the ITV show Primeval in 2009. He was also a regular guest actor on The Bill between 1994 and 2003, before taking on the role of series regular David Radford in 2004.

== Life and career ==
McSweeney was born on 20 December 1966 in Lambeth, London and following training at London Academy of Performing Arts (LAPA), and the Academy Drama School, he appeared in such roles as 'One Ball Bill' in Keen Eddie comedy-drama television series for the Fox network, alongside Sienna Miller in 2003. In 2003, he joined the cast of the BBC soap opera EastEnders as Graham Foster, with the character appearing until January 2005, after the character was found guilty for the rape of Little Mo Mitchell (Kacey Ainsworth), which resulted in her pregnancy. He was in Steven Berkoff's groundbreaking production of On The Waterfront at the Theatre Royal Haymarket in 2008. In the summer of 2011, while performing in Steven Berkoff's "Oedipus" at the Edinburgh Fringe Festival, Alex directed a cast of young actors in the play A Hero of Our Time. The play, written by Alex was a take on the Russian Novel by Mikhail Lermontov and was generally received well by critics. He played the recurring role of D.S. Sykes in Hollyoaks from 2013 until his character was killed by gangster Fraser Black in April 2014. He played a lecturer who has a motorbike accident in BBC Doctors in 2015. In an episode of Call the Midwife (March 2016), he played Joe Blacker.

Alongside his acting career, he is also a Doctor of Literature and lectures at two London Universities in English & Drama. Drama at Kingston University and is a Senior Lecturer in English and Creative Writing at London Southbank University. He wrote 'Out of the Cage' a play about women munition workers in the First World War in 2013/14. It subsequently got published and premiered at the Park Theatre London in January 2015. A national tour of the play was put in motion for 2017. He then appeared in Endeavour in 2017 as 'Terence Bakewell'.

In 2023, it was announced McSweeney would reprise the role of Graham in EastEnders as part of a storyline which sees the character's son Freddie Slater (Bobby Brazier) discover his true paternity.

== Filmography ==
=== Film ===
Year	Title	Role	Notes
1987	Rumic World: The Laughing Target	Student (voice)	Uncredited
1988	Demon City Shinjuku	Chibi (voice)	Credited as Alan Sherman
1997	Table 5	Bill Chamberlain	
1999	The Escort	Taxi Driver	
2000	Gangster No. 1	Bloke In Tailor's	
2001	Sunday Morning	Hustler	Short film
2003	Courts mais GAY: Tome 6	Hustler	
2004	Secrets	Robert	Short film
2007	Shoot on Sight	PC Brian Andrews	
2008	Hellboy II: The Golden Army	Policeman	
2008	Brixton 85	Ward Policeman	Short film
2011	A Little Bit of Grief	Peg	Short film
2012	Oedipus	Shepherd / Ensemble	Video

=== Television ===
Year	Title	Role	Notes
1990	Violence Jack	Thug (voice)	Episode: "Violence Jack, Part 3: Hell's Wind"
1990	Genocyber	Scientist (voice)	Episodes: "Vajranoid Attack" and "Global War"
1994–2004	The Bill	Lighterman (1994) / Eddie Peacock (1998) / Hall (2000) / Chris (2003) / David Radford (2004)	22 episodes
1999	Maisie Raine	Ski Mask 2	Episode: "European Forty Five"
2000	The Apocalypse	Lucius	Television film
2001	Submerged	Seaman Lawrence Gainor	Television film
2002	Get Carman: The Trials of George Carman QC	Geoff Knights	Television film
2003–2004	Keen Eddie	One Ball Bill	Episodes: "Horse Heir", Sticky Fingers" and "Keeping Up Appearances"
2003	In Deep	Ian	Episodes: "Full Disclosure: Part 1" and "Full Disclosure: Part 2"
2003–2005, 2023	EastEnders	Graham Foster	Regular role
2003, 2012	Silent Witness	DS Rufus Smith (2003) / Frank McAteer (2012)	Episodes: "Fatal Error: Part 1 and Part 2" and "Domestic: Part 1 and Part 2"
2004, 2015	Doctors	Colin Murphy (2004) / Iain Johnson (2015)	Episodes: "Primary Care" and "In Search of Happiness"
2005	The Commander	PC Mick Camel	Episodes: "Blackdog Part 1 and Part 2"
2005	The Last Detective	Warrant Officer Tony Monkford	Episode: "Towpaths of Glory"
2005, 2009	Holby City	Derek Johns (2005) / Sean Andrews (2009)	Episodes: "The Long Goodbye" and "Take Her Breath Away"
2007	Inspector Lewis	Paul	Episode: "Old School Ties"
2009	Primeval (TV Series)	Captain Wilder	4 episodes
2011	Sirens	Dennis Bayldon	Episode: "Cry"
2012	Crime Stories	Patrick Johnson	1 episode
2016	Call the Midwife	Joe Blacker	1 episode
2017	Endeavour	Terence Bakewell	Episode: "Lazaretto"
2018	The Athena	Tony (Sam's Dad)	1 episode
