= Louise Berridge =

British historical fiction writer

Louise Berridge is a British historical fiction writer. She was previously a television producer and script editor, her most famous post being the executive producer of BBC's EastEnders between 2002 and 2004. During her tenure, the long-running soap opera received heavy media criticism and ratings slumped to just over 6 million viewers.

== Early life ==
Berridge read English at St Anne's College, Oxford. She worked first as a teacher before moving into the television industry.

== Television career ==
Louise started as script editor on Central Television's comedy drama Boon, then moved to Granada Television to work on the medical drama Medics. Her big break came in 1993 when she became the series script editor for the BBC1 soap opera EastEnders, later going on to become the series story editor, where she worked on the highly successful storyline "Sharongate".

In 1995, she left the popular soap to become a producer. She started as a producer with video drama, doing a series of Medics, followed by two series of Staying Alive, and then moved to film drama. Her credits include Messiah, McCready and Daughter, Ambassador II, and an adaptation of Wuthering Heights.

=== EastEnders ===
In January 2002, Berridge returned to EastEnders when she was appointed Series Producer of the show, and four months later she was promoted to Executive Producer. During her time there, she introduced characters, such as Alfie Moon, Dennis Rickman, Chrissie Watts, Jane Beale, Stacey Slater and the critically panned Indian Ferreira family. She axed several long standing characters including Mark Fowler, Roy & Barry Evans and Lynne Slater.

Berridge was responsible for some ratings success stories, such as the Alfie/Kat love storyline, Janine Butcher leaving the show and getting her comeuppance, Jamie Mitchell's death and the return of one of the greatest soap icons, "Dirty" Den Watts who had been presumed dead for fourteen years. His return in late 2003 was watched by over 16 million viewers, putting EastEnders back at number one in the rating war with the ITV's rival soap Coronation Street. However, other storylines, such as a storyline about a kidney transplant involving the Ferrieras, were not well received, and although Den Watts' return proved to be a ratings success, the British press branded the plot unrealistic and felt that it questioned the show's credibility. A severe press backlash followed after Den's actor, Leslie Grantham, was outed in an internet sex scandal, which coincided with a swift decline in viewer ratings.

On 21 September 2004, Berridge quit as executive producer of EastEnders following continued criticism of the show. The same day the programme received its lowest ever ratings at that time (6.2 million) when ITV scheduled an hour-long episode of its rival soap, Emmerdale, against it. Emmerdale was watched by 8.1 million people. Her immediate superior, Mal Young (at the time BBC Controller of Continuing Drama Series), said Berridge "will now be involved in a major new drama project."

== Writing career ==
Berridge writes full-time as A.L. Berridge. Honour and the Sword was her first novel, reflecting a lifelong passion for history. The first of 'Chevalier' series following the fictional life and adventures of André de Roland in seventeenth century France, it was published by Penguin Books in April 2010. Honour and the Sword became an instant Sunday Times bestseller. A sequel, In the Name of the King, was published August 2011.

Her latest novel, Into the Valley of Death, begins a second series featuring Victorian military hero Harry Ryder. It is set in the Crimean War, and follows Ryder through the battles of Alma and Inkerman as well as the Charge of the Light Brigade at Balaklava.

Media offices
| Preceded by John Yorke | Executive Producer of EastEnders; 26 July 2002 – 18 November 2004 | Succeeded by Kathleen Hutchison |
