= Kathleen Hutchison =

British television presenter

Kathleen Hutchison is a British television producer, whose credits include Playing the Field, Holby City (of which she was the Series Producer, then Executive producer for many years) and Casualty @ Holby City.

== EastEnders ==
On 21 September 2004, Hutchison was appointed Executive Producer of the BBC television soap opera EastEnders, after Executive Producer, Louise Berridge, resigned following prolonged critical and public criticism of the show.

Hutchison was appointed Executive Producer of EastEnders by Mal Young following a prolonged tenure as Executive Producer and critical acclaim for her work at "Holby". Within a few weeks of Hutchison's appointment Mal Young had moved on, being replaced by John Yorke, a previous Executive Producer of EastEnders.

Hutchison was given the task of reversing the fortunes of the BBC's flagship soap; in previous months viewing figures had suffered when up against ITV1's Emmerdale.

During her time at the soap Hutchison axed multiple characters, and reportedly ordered the rewriting of numerous scripts. In January 2005, Hutchison left the soap and commented: “I’ve enjoyed my brief time at EastEnders and wish the show the very best."

John Yorke, BBC Controller of Continuing Drama Series, took total control of the show himself and became acting Executive Producer for a short period, before appointing Kate Harwood. John Yorke said, “Kathleen has done a fantastic job of managing EastEnders during this period of change - I am very grateful to her for all her hard work and for leaving the show in such a strong position for us to build on.”

== Other projects ==
Hutchison moved from drama to comedy in 2005 setting up The Hutch Management, working with stand-up comedians and developing comedy projects for stage and television including a pilot sketch show for Feelgood Fiction starring Nathan Caton in January 2007 and a 30 minute narrative comedy Standing-Up, written by Tommy Mack.

In February 2007, Hutchison joined television channel Paramount Comedy as Head of New Comedy. Her remit was to develop and nurture new talent from the comedy circuit. She has already worked with names such as Rob Rouse, We Are Klang and Jim Jefferies under the banner Shortcuts.

In summer 2007, Hutchison was a judge at the IF.Comedies, formerly the Perrier prize at the Edinburgh Fringe Festival.

Media offices
Preceded by Louise Berridge	Executive Producer of EastEnders; 20 December 2004 – 1 April 2005	Succeeded by Kate Harwood
