= Joe Cooper =

Joe Cooper may refer to:

- Joe Cooper (basketball) (born 1957), American basketball player
- Joe Cooper (footballer, born 1865) (1865–?), English footballer for Wolverhampton Wanderers and Woolwich Arsenal
- Joe Cooper (footballer, born 1899) (1899–1959), English footballer for Grimsby Town and several other clubs
- Joe Cooper (footballer, born 1918) (1918–1992), English footballer
- Joe Cooper (footballer, born 1994), English football defender
- Joe Cooper (ice hockey) (1914–1979), Canadian ice hockey player
- Joe Cooper (kicker) (born 1960), American football player
- Joe Cooper (linebacker) (born 1979), American football player
- Joe Cooper (racing driver) (1888–1915), American racing driver
- Joe Henry Cooper (1918–1980), American businessman and Louisiana politician
- Joe Cooper (presenter), British broadcaster & radio presenter
- Robert Joel Cooper, aka Joe Cooper (1860–1936), buffalo hunter of the Northern Territory of Australia

== See also ==
- Joseph Cooper (disambiguation)
