= Zorzor District =

District in Lofa County, Liberia

- District
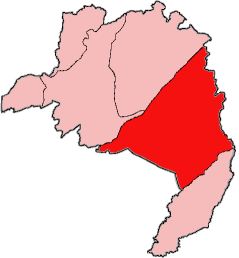
- Coordinates: 7°46′46″N 9°25′49″W
- Country: Liberia
- County: Lofa
- Time zone: WAT

Zorzor District is one of six districts located in Lofa County, Liberia. Zorzor is the principal city of the county. The district is home to the city of Zorzor which serves as a prominent local trading hub for agricultural commodities like rice, cassava, pineapples, palm oil, and palm kernels. Within Zorzor, the predominant ethnic groups are the Kpelle and Loma peoples.

Among the county's natives was Joseph Nargba Cooper; born in the district town of Gbaudi in 1918, Cooper was a member of the House of Representatives from 1967 until his 1975 death.
