= Elliott Jordan =

British actor (born 1983)

- Born: 22 April 1983 (age 43); Essex, England
- Occupation: Actor
- Years active: 2000–present
- Notable work: EastEnders; Benidorm
- Spouse: Olivia Jordan (m. 2017)

Elliott Jordan (born 22 April 1983) is an English actor best known for playing Callum Monks in the BBC drama EastEnders and Jack in the ITV sitcom Benidorm.

== Career ==
Jordan started acting at The Sylvia Young Theatre School then joined the National Youth Theatre.

He has appeared in numerous television programs, including Father Brown, Casualty, Silk, My Family, Waking the Dead, HolbyBlue, The Inspector Lynley Mysteries, Sea of Souls, The Bill and Murphy's Law and Benidorm (TV Series)

Jordan also played the ex-boyfriend in Lily Allen's music video "Smile".

On 26 June 2008, it was revealed that Elliott would be joining the famous BBC soap opera EastEnders, as Vinnie Monks' long-lost son, Callum. He revealed in an interview that his peer mentor when he arrived was Jake Wood. Executive Producer Diederick Santer added: "Callum – played by the very talented and striking Elliott Jordan – will bring a breath of fresh air to Walford. Bright, twinkly, and with the gift of the gab, he'll get the women of Walford all of a flutter." On 20 January 2009 it was announced that Jordan would be leaving EastEnders; he made his final appearance in March 2009.

Jordan appeared in the second series of the ITV comedy Benidorm, playing Jack, a young lad who catches his eye on Janice and they start a fling together. He reprised this role for the 2009 one-hour Special when he interrupted Madge and Mel's wedding. He appeared once again as Jack for Benidorm series five in 2012 and series 6 in 2014.

In 2013 he appeared in Family Tree, a HBO mockumentary-style television comedy directed by Christopher Guest.

== Filmography ==
=== Television ===
Year	Title	Role	Notes
2000	Lock, Stock...	Kebab Shop Kid	Episode: '...And Four Stolen Hooves'
2001	London's Burning	Danny	Series 13, episode 6
2002	Murder	Young Captain	Television film
2003	Reps	Anth	
2004	Murphy's Law	Damien Banks	
2004	The Bill	David Brunton	Episode 274: 'The Cold Winter Blues'
2005, 2008–2009	EastEnders	Gavin / Callum Monks	53 episodes
2006	Sea of Souls	Josh	Episode: 'Sleeper'
2006	The Inspector Lynley Mysteries	Luke Barnes	Episode: 'In the Blink of an Eye'
2008–09, 2012, 2014	Benidorm	Jack	Recurring role (Series 2), Benidorm Special, Guest Role (Series 5–6)
2008	Waking the Dead	Mark Bennett	Episodes: 'Duty and Honour: Parts 1&2'
2008	HolbyBlue	Kieron Roberts	Series 2, episode 8
2011	My Family	Sean	Episode: "A Decent Proposal"
2012	Silk	DC Damien Waters	Series 2, episode 6
2012	Crime Stories	Ivan Williams	
2013	Spying on Hitler's Army: The Secret Recordings]	Hartelt	Television film
2013	Family Tree	P.C. Garry Dawson	2 episodes
2015	Casualty	Richard Webb	Episode: 'Knock Knock Who's There?'
2016	Father Brown	George Parkin	Episode: 'The Star of Jacob'

=== Film ===
Year	Title	Role	Notes
2002	Fogbound	boy aged 16	
2005	New Town Original	Mick	
2005	The Toybox	Brian Usher	
2009	Cowboys	Gav	Short film
2012	Community	Will	
2014	Pass		Also producer
2019	In Two Minds	PC Roberts	Short film

=== Music video ===
Year	Title	Artist
2006	"Smile"	Lily Allen

== Stage ==
- Ste, Beautiful Thing, Nottingham Playhouse, 2002
- Terry, Mercy, Soho Theatre, 2004
- Davey, Vincent River, Landor Theatre, 2010

== Personal life ==
Elliott and his wife Olivia were married in September 2017 on the Isle of Wight.
