= Joseph Cooper =

Joseph Cooper may refer to:

- Joseph Cooper (pirate) (died 1725), pirate active in the Caribbean
- Joseph Cooper (broadcaster) (1912–2001), English pianist and broadcaster
- Joseph Cooper (cyclist) (born 1985), New Zealand cyclist
- Joseph Alexander Cooper (1823–1910), American soldier
- Joseph F. Cooper (1854–1942), American jurist
- Joseph Nargba Cooper (1918–1975), Liberian politician
- Joseph Cooper, the protagonist in the 2014 film Interstellar

== See also ==
- Joseph Cooper House, a historic house in Camden, New Jersey, United States
- Joe Cooper (disambiguation)
