= Sylvia Young Theatre School =

Coordinates: 51°31′1″N 0°9′45″W

Location
- 1 Nutford Place; London, W1H 5YZ; England

Information
- Type: Private day and boarding
- Established: 1972
- Founder: Sylvia Young
- Local authority: Westminster
- Specialist: Performing Arts
- Department for Education URN: 101172 Tables
- Headteacher: Anne-Marie Kennedy
- Gender: Co-educational
- Age: 10 to 16
- Enrolment: 230~
- Website: syts.co.uk

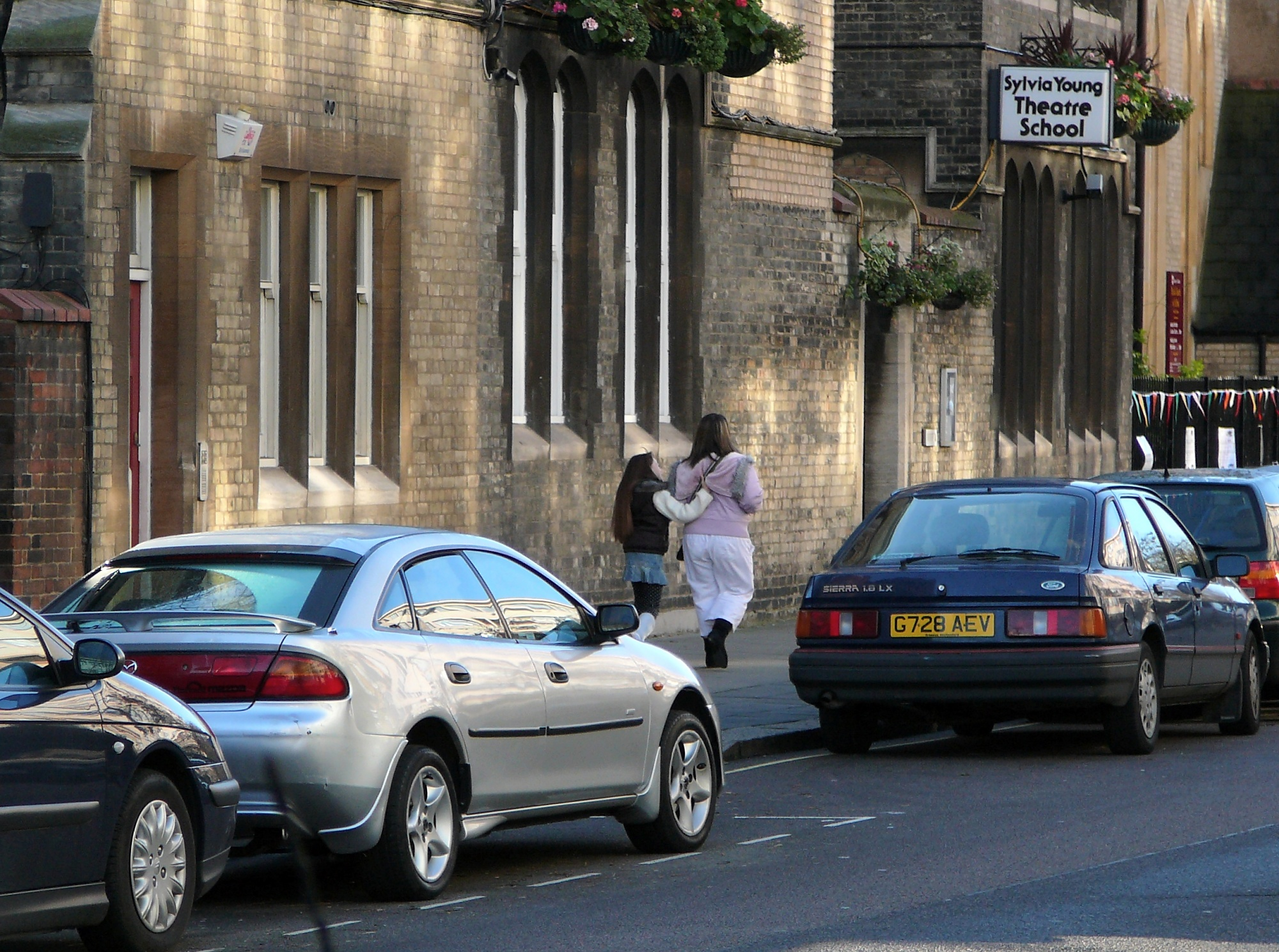
Sylvia Young Theatre School, Rossmore Road, 2006.

Sylvia Young Theatre School is an independent school in Marble Arch, London, England. It is a specialist performing arts school named after its founder and first principal, Sylvia Young OBE.

== Outline ==
The Sylvia Young Theatre School was founded in 1972 with part-time classes in east London. It was established as a full-time school in 1981 on Drury Lane and, due to expansion, it moved to a former 1880s church school building in Rossmore Road, Marylebone in 1983. The school moved premises once again in 2010 to a converted church in Nutford Place, Westminster.

Students either attend the full-time school (students aged 10 to 16 years), the part-time school on Thursday evenings and Saturdays (students aged 4 to 18 years) or holiday schools (students aged 7 to 18 years). Tuition fees for full-time schooling (as of 2022) are £15,000 per annum for day pupils, £25,000–30,000 per annum for boarding pupils. (Day pupils outnumber boarding pupils by a factor of five to one.)

Students from the Sylvia Young Theatre School have appeared in television, film and theatre productions, including main roles in EastEnders, Merry Christmas, Mr. Bean, Matilda, Billy Elliot, The Lion King, The Bodyguard, Les Misérables, and Charlie and the Chocolate Factory.

The school has been described as "Eton for the Pop Idol generation" and is renowned for producing soap stars, pop stars and TV personalities.

== Notable alumni ==
Performers who attended the Sylvia Young Theatre School include:

- Adam Woodyatt
- Adele Silva
- Adrianna Bertola
- Aisling Jarrett-Gavin
- Alex Pettyfer
- Alex Walkinshaw
- Amy Winehouse
- Archie Lyndhurst
- Ashley Horne
- Ashley Walters
- Ben Radcliffe
- Bessie Cursons
- Bethan Wright
- Billie Piper
- Camilla Power
- Carrie Hope Fletcher
- Ceallach Spellman
- Charlotte Spencer
- Chris Overton
- Clare Buckfield
- Clare Burt
- Dani Behr
- Daniel Kaluuya
- Danielle McCormack
- Danniella Westbrook
- Dean Gaffney
- Denise Van Outen
- Desmond Askew
- Dionne Bromfield
- District3
- Dominique Moore
- Dua Lipa
- Elaine Tan
- Ella Purnell
- Emma Bunton
- Fern Deacon
- Frances Ruffelle
- Gemma Collins
- Giovanna Fletcher
- Hakeem Kae-Kazim
- Hollie Chapman
- Iain Robertson
- India Amarteifio
- Isabel Hodgins
- Isabella Pappas
- Jade Ewen
- Jade Alleyne
- Jake Roche
- James Lance
- Jamie Borthwick
- Jasmin Walia
- Jasmine Thompson
- Javine Hylton
- Jaymi Hensley
- Jemima Rooper
- Jenna Russell
- Jennifer Veal
- Jesy Nelson
- Jodi Albert
- Joe Cooper
- John McCrea
- John Pickard
- Jon Lee
- Joseph Kpobie
- Josh Cuthbert
- Julie Buckfield
- Kara Tointon
- Karim Zeroual
- Keeley Hawes
- Kellie Bright
- Lashana Lynch
- Laura Evans
- Laura Sadler
- Lauren Platt
- Layton Williams
- Leigh-Anne Pinnock
- Leona Lewis
- Letitia Dean
- Lily Cole
- Louisa Lytton
- Lucinda Dryzek
- Luisa Bradshaw-White
- Mark Wright
- Matt Di Angelo
- Matt Willis
- Matthew James Thomas
- Mazz Murray
- Melanie Blatt
- Mimi Slinger
- Mohammed George
- Molly Rainford
- Montana Manning
- Natalie Appleton
- Nethra Tilakumara
- Nathan Sykes
- Nicholas Hoult
- Nick Berry
- Nick Pickard
- Nicola Stapleton
- Nicole Appleton
- Perry Fenwick
- Pixie Davies
- Poppy Lee Friar
- Preeya Kalidas
- Reni Eddo-Lodge
- Renée Downer
- Rita Ora
- Robert Madge
- Rory Jennings
- Sam Callahan
- Samantha Womack
- Sapphire Elia
- Sarah Harrison
- Scott Robinson
- Scott Charles
- Sean Borg
- Shannon Arrum Williams
- Sheree Murphy
- Simon Lipkin
- Sophie Lawrence
- Stefan Abingdon
- Stella Quaresma
- Steven Mackintosh
- Sydney Rae White
- Tamzin Outhwaite
- Tom Fletcher
- Tony Bignell
- Vanessa White
