= Vinnie Monks =

Fictional character

- EastEnders character
- Portrayed by: Bobby Davro
- Duration: 2007–2008
- First appearance: Episode 3448; 8 October 2007
- Last appearance: Episode 3691; 1 December 2008
- Created by: Diederick Santer
In-universe information
- Occupation: Taxi driver
- Sons: Callum Monks
- Daughters: Hayley Monks

Vinnie Monks is a fictional character from the BBC soap opera EastEnders, played by comedian Bobby Davro. He made his first appearance on 8 October 2007. It was announced on 19 July 2008 that Davro quit the show to do other projects. He made his final appearance on 1 December 2008.

== Character creation and development ==
=== Background and casting ===
Vinnie Monks was introduced by the executive producer of EastEnders, Diederick Santer. The character, described as "a loveable rogue", was brought in as a love interest for the character Shirley Carter (Linda Henry) in October 2007.

The role was given to Bobby Davro, known to the British audience as a 1980s comic, impressionist, and a 1990s children's TV presenter. Davro has revealed that he auditioned for the role on the advice of actress Barbara Windsor, who plays landlady Peggy Mitchell: "It's through her really that I got this chance." Bobby Davro was said to be "chuffed" when he got the part. He has commented: "EastEnders is a high-profile show, but I'm already used to the attention which being on telly brings […] I love the part and I'm learning. I'm still trying not to look straight at the camera, that's the entertainer in me! Everyone has just been fantastic […] This is so exciting for me. I want to go in and really work hard and see myself get better […] I've never really acted before…I'm enjoying learning the trade."

Davro is one of several comedians or comic actors to be given a role in EastEnders, a tradition that goes back to 1987, when comedian Mike Reid was cast as Frank Butcher. The casting of a comedian in a dramatic role was highly controversial at the time, but over the years the wisdom of that decision was proved, as Frank became one of the show's most popular and iconic characters. Other comic actors featured in EastEnders include Barbara Windsor (known for her roles in Carry On films) as Peggy Mitchell, and entertainer Shane Richie, who played Alfie Moon. Vinnie has been described as a "chip off the old block" from former characters such as Frank and Alfie, with reports even claiming that he is being used as Alfie's replacement. Davro has commented on the comparison between his character and Shane Richie's character, Alfie: "Shane and I are big pals, we go back 20 years. We have the same sort of background and that's probably why comparisons are being made. I don't like that idea because Shane was such a good asset to the show. It puts a lot of pressure on me […] If [Vinnie] could be half as successful as Alfie Moon then I'd be well chuffed […] [Shane Richie] gave me some great advice…he told me to listen to the other actors and to learn your lines properly. That has helped so far…"

=== Personality ===
Vinnie has been described as "a cheeky chap", a charmer, with a lot of old-fashioned values; the sort of person who would not do anyone an injustice. Davro has said "he's a very sensitive bloke is Vinnie, He's a bit scared of commitment, scared of getting hurt [...] I model him on a friend of mine, David, and also on Vince from [the BBC sitcom] Just Good Friends."

=== Departure ===
Davro quit the show in July 2008, saying he wanted to pursue other projects. He reportedly said he wished to appear in the show from time to time, saying "I have had a fantastic year with EastEnders and made lots of friends. I hope to be back at some point." However, in December 2009, it was reported that Davro had quit because he found the role boring, saying "I wish it could have been longer. But the writers didn't develop him as much as I wanted and I got bored."

== Storylines ==
Vinnie is first seen in Walford after he knocks over Shirley Carter (Linda Henry) with his car when she is on her way to court. Vinnie offers to take her to hospital but she wants to be in court for her son, Deano Wicks (Matt Di Angelo). Vinnie goes with her and then takes Shirley to hospital and later offers a lift home along with Shirley's friend, Heather Trott (Cheryl Ferguson). When they get home, Vinnie gives his phone number and address to Shirley and tells her to telephone him if she needs anything. Shirley pretends to be more injured than she really is, telling Heather, "where there's blame, there's a claim". Vinnie goes on to work Shirley's shift at The Queen Victoria public house, so she can get her normal wages even though she is unable to work due to a neck injury, but Vinnie withholds her wages unless she agrees to go on a date with him. Shirley refuses, but Vinnie gives her the money anyway along with his phone number. He turns up again a few weeks later when Heather phones him and, although Shirley isn't impressed at first, he wins her over with a bottle of wine and they go on a date.

It is later revealed that Vinnie has a daughter named Hayley, although Heather thinks Vinnie is having an affair when she hears him talking to her on the phone. Shirley breaks up with Vinnie but they decide to get back together. Vinnie waits for Shirley at the underground station but her watch breaks and she turns up late, and he had got on the train before she arrived. He returns in April 2008 as he realises that he is in love with Shirley. He spends all his money on a deposit on a flat in Walford and begs Shirley to move in with him, forcing her to choose between him and current love interest Phil Mitchell (Steve McFadden). When Phil shows no inclination of taking things further, a reluctant Shirley agrees to Vinnie's proposal and they begin living together. Over the next few months, Vinnie gets a job as a taxi driver at the firm run by Pat Evans (Pam St Clement) and helps organise a Best of British day at the pub when Shirley is left in charge.

Despite all this, however, things begin to deteriorate in his relationship with Shirley. Over the next few months, Shirley finds herself more in love with Phil and less in love with Vinnie. She spends less time with him, constantly going clubbing with Heather, and when Vinnie tries to be romantic by booking them a holiday, Shirley retaliates by taking Heather in his place. After she forgets his birthday, Vinnie finally confronts her, resulting in Shirley revealing her true feelings for Phil. This leads to the end of their romance as Vinnie throws Shirley out of the flat, making her homeless. He later relents and gives her the keys to the flat, moving in instead with his mates Garry Hobbs (Ricky Groves) and Minty Peterson (Cliff Parisi). The following month, Vinnie returns from a holiday with Garry and Minty to find that his son Callum Monks (Elliott Jordan) has arrived in Walford and is squatting in their flat. During their conversation, it is revealed that Vinnie had lost touch with Callum over the years due to his extramarital affair which caused the breakdown of his marriage to Callum's mother. Vinnie and Callum put their differences behind them and Vinnie allows Callum to stay.

Vinnie soon begins to feel that his life in Walford is pointless, so when an old friend offers him the chance to travel across the world in a vintage car, he immediately accepts the offer. Seeing that his ex-girlfriend Shirley is now down on her luck as Phil has a new girlfriend, Suzy Branning (Maggie O'Neill), he invites Shirley to come along with him. The couple rekindle their relationship and make their exit from Walford on 1 December 2008. However, prior to them leaving, Vinnie learns that the night before Phil and Shirley had had a one-night stand. With this thought weighing him down Vinnie stops the car just outside Walford and tells Shirley to return to Albert Square as by staying with him she'd only be settling for second best. As Shirley makes her way back home, Vinnie is last seen driving off alone to catch a ferry to France.

On 6 March 2009, before departing for good from the Square, Callum mentions that he is on his way to visit Vinnie. It is then revealed that Vinnie and Callum are living in Southend. In January 2012, Shirley contacts him after Phil is imprisoned and he agrees to send some work to The Arches.
