= List of EastEnders characters introduced in 2008 =

EastEnders logo

The following is a list of characters that first appeared in the BBC soap opera EastEnders, which aired in 2008 (in order of first appearance). All characters were introduced by executive producer Diederick Santer, who introduced four characters in January: Mr. Lister (Nick Wilton), a new market inspector; Christian Clarke (John Partridge), the brother of Jane Beale (Laurie Brett); and two members of the Branning family, Selina (Daisy Beaumont) and Penny (Mia McKenna-Bruce). In March, he introduced Jalil Iqbal (Jan Uddin), a new love interest for Shabnam Masood (Zahra Ahmadi). In April, he introduced Ricky Butcher's (Sid Owen) fiancée, Melinda (Siobhan Hayes), as well as Bianca Jackson's (Patsy Palmer) children, Whitney (Shona McGarty), Morgan (Devon Higgs) and Tiffany (Maisie Smith). In April, he also introduced Denise Fox's (Diane Parish) ex-husband, Lucas Johnson (Don Gilet), and Opal Smith (Rustie Lee), the aunt of Gus (Mohammed George) and Juley Smith (Joseph Kpobie). In May, he extended the Johnson family and introduced Lucas's son, Jordan (Michael-Joel David Stuart), as well as introducing Brenda Boyle (Carmel Cryan), a new love interest for Charlie Slater (Derek Martin). In July, he introduced two members of the Mitchell family: Archie Mitchell (Larry Lamb) and Danielle Jones (Lauren Crace). In August, he introduced Callum Monks (Elliott Jordan), the son of Vinnie (Bobby Davro), and in September Tony King (Chris Coghill) was introduced as the partner of Bianca. Poppy Merritt (Amy Darcy) was also introduced as the new GP of Walford. November saw the only birth of the year, Amy Mitchell, the child of Roxy Mitchell (Rita Simons) and Jack Branning (Scott Maslen). The final introduction of the year was Dotty (Molly Conlin), Nick Cotton's (John Altman) daughter, in December.

== Mr. Lister ==
Mr Lister
- EastEnders character
- Portrayed by: Nick Wilton
- Duration: 2008–2013, 2016–2018, 2020–2022, 2024–2025
- First appearance: Episode 3501/3502; 3 January 2008
- Last appearance: Episode 7172; 14 August 2025
- Introduced by: Diederick Santer (2008); Sean O'Connor (2016); Jon Sen (2020); Chris Clenshaw (2024) Ben Wadey (2025)
In-universe information
- Occupation: Market inspector

Robert Lister, usually referred to as Mr. Lister and played by Nick Wilton, is the market inspector at Bridge Street market. He is the successor of Marie Matthews (Susan Cruse). He first appeared on 3 January 2008, but his first name was not revealed until 7 June 2013, which would be his last appearance for three years. Wilton reprised the role in 2016 for one episode broadcast on 15 August. The character was reintroduced for a story with Robbie Jackson (Dean Gaffney) in July 2017, and again in December 2017. He then appeared in one episode broadcast in July 2018. The character made further appearances on 7 January 2020 and 28 December 2021.

In his first appearance, Lister sacked his assistant, Bradley Branning (Charlie Clements). He appeared on a recurring basis thereafter. His next appearance was when Tamwar Masood (Himesh Patel) sought approval for a new stall, which Lister accepted. In August 2008, Billy Mitchell (Perry Fenwick) got a job as the market cleaner but Lister sacked him when he lost his cart. In October 2008, Ronnie Mitchell (Samantha Janus) phoned him because Danielle Jones (Lauren Crace) was selling stolen nightwear in the clothes stall. In May 2009, Lister closed down Stacey Slater's (Lacey Turner) stall and in September of that year, he closed it again and gave it to Ryan Malloy (Neil McDermott). In February 2010, Stacey and her friend Becca Swanson (Simone James) decided to set up a stall but Lister turned them down as he did not like Stacey. Becca dressed up and pretended to be from Walford Council. She told Lister that Stacey had lodged a complaint against him, and made legal threats. Lister then gave Stacey her stall.

In April 2010, Lister was seen investigating Fatboy's (Ricky Norwood) van, as Fatboy was trying to sell T-shirts from the vehicle without a market license. In May 2010, Syed Masood (Marc Elliott) asked Lister if he could start a market stall, and Lister suggested a mobile phone stall. While he was having a drink with Syed, Roxy Mitchell (Rita Simons) refused to serve Syed, which Lister interpreted as racism. In October 2010, Kat Moon (Jessie Wallace) squirted water at him, so he ordered Stacey to discipline or sack Kat. Stacey refused and squirted water at him as well, so he revoked Stacey's market trader's license. In March 2011, Lister offered Fatboy a month's trial on his own stall after Fatboy and Mo Harris (Laila Morse) argued over it.

In April 2011, Lister complained to Billy that his stall was in the wrong position, but Billy said nobody cared. Whitney Dean (Shona McGarty) asked for her stall back, and they got chatting. He moaned about his life as he got abused by stallholders regularly, and his wife had left him so he rarely saw his two children. He invited Whitney for a drink and comforted her, saying that her stepfather, Ricky Butcher (Sid Owen), was doing what was best for her. As Lister got up to leave, he fell onto Whitney, prompting Janine Butcher (Charlie Brooks) to threaten him and call him a pervert. In May, Denise Fox (Diane Parish) asked Lister to get involved with Patrick Trueman (Rudolph Walker) but Lister said he had no say over the shop, which Patrick owned. In June, Whitney and Lauren Branning (Jacqueline Jossa) asked Lister for a stall, but he was reluctant as Whitney had lost a stall for not paying her rent. However, he agreed as long as the arrears were paid and a month's rent paid in advance. In July, Lister issued Fatboy with a warning for kicking his own stall, but Fatboy decided to abandon his stall before he could be disciplined. He warned Eddie Moon (David Essex) about fly-tipping and was threatened by Eddie's son Tyler (Tony Discipline). Lister later accepted a bribe from Eddie. In November, Lister appeared following reports that someone was selling Dutch Father Christmas toys and asked Alfie Moon (Shane Richie) if he knew anything. Alfie denied any knowledge, although it was his relatives Tyler and Anthony Moon (Matt Lapinskas) who were involved. Anthony asked Fatboy to change them, so they no longer spoke Dutch, but Lister later saw one that played a jingle in Fatboy's voice.

In April 2012, Lister complained to Bianca Butcher (Patsy Palmer) that rubbish from the café was overspilling into the market, so she angrily emptied the rubbish into the street. A few days later, Bianca attempted to steal a handbag belonging to a market trader. She was caught and, in the struggle, hit and injured Lister. He called the police, resulting in Bianca's arrest and imprisonment. It later emerged that he had taken out a restraining order against Bianca, meaning that she could no longer go to the market or Bridge Street. In September, Lister threatened to call the police on Shirley Carter (Linda Henry), who was lying drunk in the street. Later that month, he reprimanded Syed for not selling his usual stock. In November, Lister accused Cora Cross (Ann Mitchell) of stealing a bag that he donated to the charity shop she managed, which led to Cora being fired. When Lister went to the salon for a haircut, Bianca washed his hair. While it was awkward at first, the pair started to bond during conversations about their children. Lister told Bianca his daughter was getting married, and he thought he would feel left out at the wedding. Lister agreed to have the restraining order dropped and gave Bianca a £5 tip. He accidentally left £20 behind and later accused Bianca of stealing it, but apologized and gave her the money after it was found. In April 2013, Lister temporarily banned Bianca and Kat from trading on the market after they played various pranks on him. Kat pretended to seduce Lister and Bianca took a photo of him with his trousers down, which they used to blackmail him to get their stall back. In June, Lister spoke to Ian Beale (Adam Woodyatt) about his new restaurant and introduced him to Danny Pennant (Gary Lucy). Ian hoped that Danny would find someone to invest in his new business. After Lister lost his job, he was replaced by Aleks Shirovs (Kristian Kiehling).

In August 2016, Lister interviewed Carmel Kazemi (Bonnie Langford) for the market inspector position. In July 2017, he had a meeting with new market inspector Robbie Jackson (Dean Gaffney) to discuss 'big changes' to the market and told Robbie that he had until Christmas to eject Donna Yates (Lisa Hammond) from the market.

In December 2021, Stacey and her ex-husband Martin Fowler (James Bye) both applied for the role of market inspector. Lister gave the job to Martin, after discovering that Stacey lied on her CV. However, Martin declined the job and recommended Stacey. Stacey's pride was bruised when she discovered that Martin was the first choice, and she resigned. Martin told Lister he would like to accept the job, but Lister had already appointed Honey Mitchell (Emma Barton).

=== Development ===
In April 2013, when Bianca and Kat put a note on Lister's back saying "prat", Heat said, "we know Lister is a prat, and a pompous one at that, but you were never going to get away with it." Wilton confirmed his departure from the soap on his website, adding that he was unable to film Lister's departure scenes as planned due to pantomime commitments. Wilton said: "I originally went into the soap for three episodes that went out in January 2008, but ended up staying for six years, during which time I met some lovely people, had a lot of fun and a few really good story lines."

== Christian Clarke ==
Christian Clarke, played by John Partridge, was introduced to the show as a new gay character and the brother of Jane Beale (Laurie Brett), after show bosses saw how popular Antony Cotton's character Sean Tully was in Coronation Street. Partridge's character was not as camp as Cotton's, and was described as "very suave and a real charmer" and a "savvy, bright character [who is] very fun." He made his first appearance on 17 January 2008. His main story line was having an affair with Muslim character Syed Masood (Marc Elliott), while Syed was engaged to Amira Shah (Preeya Kalidas).

== Ashley Jennings ==
Ashley Jennings, played by Tony Boncza, was the fiancé of Christian Clarke (John Partridge), and appeared in the episode broadcast on 17 January 2008. He was described by Soaplife as Christian's rich "sugar daddy". In the episode, Ashley and Christian had a meal with Christian's sister Jane Beale (Laurie Brett) and her husband Ian Beale (Adam Woodyatt). Ashley left the meal early after Christian revealed that he was in love with Jane's ex-husband David Collins (Dan Milne). He and Christian broke up, and Christian moved in with the Beales.

== Tegs Teague ==
Tegs Teague
- EastEnders character
- Portrayed by: Ben Smith
- First appearance: Episode 3510; 17 January 2008
- Last appearance: Episode 3513; 22 January 2008
- Introduced by: Diederick Santer
In-universe information
- Mother: Tina Teague

"Tegs" Teague, played by Ben Smith, was the ringleader of a gang called the E2. He appeared between 17 and 22 January 2008 along with the rest of the gang. The gang harassed Dot Branning (June Brown) by wolf-whistling at her and calling her a zombie, prompting Shirley Carter (Linda Henry) to tell them to leave Dot alone. The gang, including Tegs' friend Ziggy (Ashley Horne), stole DVDs from Winston's (Ulric Browne) market stall, with the help of Jay Brown (Jamie Borthwick). Tegs asked Jay if he wanted to join the gang and gave him a mobile phone so they could call each other. Jay sneaked out and was given a knife by Tegs, which was later found by Jay's father, Jase Dyer (Stephen Lord) and his girlfriend Dawn Swann (Kara Tointon). The next day, the gang stole several packs of cigarettes from the local shop, the Minute Mart. They harassed Dot by making silent phone calls and knocked on her door and ran away. Tegs pulled a knife on Minty Peterson (Cliff Parisi) after he confronted the group. Jay and Tegs fought after Jay criticized Tegs' harassment of Dot. After an apparent reconciliation, the gang asked Teg whether he was with them or Jay – Tegs then stabbed Jay in the leg, leaving him bleeding on the ground. Tegs' mum, Tina Teague (Kerry Ann White) tried to persuade Jay to drop the charges, but it went to an off-screen trial on 29 February when he was sentenced to two years in a Young Offenders Institution.

=== Development ===
The storyline in which Tegs stabbed Jay was the first teenage gang-related attack featured in EastEnders. Kris Green from Digital Spy described him as 'out of control'. Ofcom received seven complaints about the stabbing episode. A BBC spokesperson responded to the complaints about the scenes being shown before the watershed: "The BBC has a strict set of editorial guidelines that all programs must adhere to, to ensure that the violence portrayed was suitable for pre-watershed viewing." Kris Green from Digital Spy defended the episode saying, "I have to say that it wasn't as gruesome as I'd imagined it would be. There's no screaming, no scuffling – it's all quiet and it happens in about 10 seconds."

== Selina Branning ==
Selina Branning
- EastEnders character
- Portrayed by: Daisy Beaumont
- First appearance: Episode 3512; 21 January 2008
- Last appearance: Episode 3519; 1 February 2008
- Introduced by: Diederick Santer
In-universe information
- Father: Howard
- Mother: Esther
- Sisters: Kellie
- Husband: Jack Branning (backstory); James (2009–present)
- Daughters: Penny Branning
- Grandsons: Ethan Branning-Panesar

Selina Branning, played by Daisy Beaumont, was the ex-wife of Jack Branning (Scott Maslen), and mother of Penny Branning (Mia McKenna-Bruce). This was Beaumont's second role in EastEnders as she previously played Helen Graham in 2000. She was listed by Digital Spy as a suspect in Max Branning's (Jake Wood) hit-and-run, but Lauren Branning (Madeline Duggan) was the culprit. She appeared between 21 January and 1 February 2008.

Selina was first heard leaving a message for Jack with Ronnie Mitchell (Samantha Womack). Ronnie later visited Selina to discuss Jack not being allowed to see their daughter, Penny, a wheelchair user who was paralyzed from the waist down. Jack slept with Selina in his club's office, witnessed by Ronnie's sister Roxy Mitchell (Rita Simons). A week later, Selina phoned Jack to say she and Penny were leaving to live in France. On 1 December 2008, Jack told Ronnie that Selina was engaged, and it was revealed on 2 March 2009 that Selina had married a man named James. Jack did not attend.

== Penny Branning ==
Penny Branning, played by Mia McKenna-Bruce, is the daughter of Jack Branning (Scott Maslen) and his first wife Selina Branning (Daisy Beaumont). She appears between 21 January and 1 February 2008, and returns from 15 to 18 April 2008. On 6 November 2023, it was announced that Penny would be returning to the show, played by Kitty Castledine. She returned alongside her cousin, Lauren Branning (Jacqueline Jossa), on 1 January 2024.

== Roger Grant ==
Roger Grant
- EastEnders character
- Portrayed by: Max Gold
- Appears in: Episode 3521; 5 February 2008
- Introduced by: Diedrick Santer

Roger "the Dodger" Grant, played by Max Gold, is a dodgy old friend of Mo Harris (Laila Morse). He appeared on 5 February 2008, selling some clothes to Stacey Branning (Lacey Turner) for her stall. Mo claimed the stock was faulty and tried to make the dye on a shirt run by pouring tea over it. When Stacey's mother Jean Slater (Gillian Wright) tried to wash the stain out, the top was ruined. Gold also played Dougie Briggs in 1994, and his casting as Roger was criticised by entertainment website Digital Spy's television critic Dek Hogan who said it was "an insult to the audience" as Briggs was such an iconic role.

== Edward Tunstall ==
Edward Tunstall
- EastEnders character
- Portrayed by: Miles Anderson
- First appearance: Episode 3522; 7 February 2008
- Last appearance: Episode 3535; 29 February 2008
- Introduced by: Diedrick Santer
In-universe information
- Occupation: Councilor

Edward Tunstall, played by Miles Anderson, was a councillor who appeared between 7 and 29 February 2008. He met Ian Beale (Adam Woodyatt) at a council lunch and decided to use Ian and Christian Clarke's (John Partridge) events business, Fit for a Queen, to organise a party. He assumed Ian was gay and asked him out for a meal, during which Ian admitted he was not totally in love with his wife, Jane Beale (Laurie Brett). Edward invited Ian to be his guest when he collected his MBE from the Queen, but Ian was unable to attend as his daughter Lucy Beale's (Melissa Suffield) had gone missing. In January 2009, the Walford Gazette reported that Tunstall was involved in a scandal with a young man, and he stepped down as councillor.

== Jalil Iqbal ==
Jalil Iqbal
- EastEnders character
- Portrayed by: Jan Uddin
- First appearance: Episode 3544; 17 March 2008
- Last appearance: Episode 3551; 28 March 2008
- Introduced by: Diedrick Santer

Jalil Iqbal, played by Jan Uddin, was a friend of the Masood family who appeared between 17 and 28 March 2008. Jalil was described as a "hunk" and it was said that he and Shabnam Masood (Zahra Ahmadi) would embark on "an affair of the heart".

Family matriarch Zainab Masood (Nina Wadia) invited Jalil to stay with the family and work in their post office for a while, trying to set him up with her daughter, Shabnam. Shabnam was initially against this, as she remembered Jalil as a "geek" from her childhood, but was attracted to him when she saw him again. Zainab set them up with a romantic meal, listening in on their conversation using a baby monitor. Shabnam discovered that Jalil had a girlfriend, but Zainab saw a picture of her and said she was ugly with make-up that looked like it had been done by Edward Scissorhands. Shabnam bumped into Jalil on a night out in R&R nightclub, where they flirted. Jalil and Shabnam later shared a kiss, but during a conversation with the Masood family, he said he thought modern Muslim women like Shabnam provided "great entertainment" but were not marriage material. Zainab was offended and sent him away.

== Melinda ==
Melinda, played by Siobhan Hayes, was the fiancée of Ricky Butcher (Sid Owen). She appeared between 1 and 4 April 2008. Melinda came to Walford with Ricky for the funeral of his father, Frank Butcher (Mike Reid). She spent most of the time on the telephone to her father asking for £25,000 as a property deposit, which he failed to provide. She made several attempts to introduce herself to Pat Evans (Pam St Clement) and was dismissive when Ricky mentioned his ex-wife Bianca Jackson's (Patsy Palmer) absence. At Frank's wake, it became clear that Melinda was only interested in what Frank had left to Ricky in his will. There was no financial gain, so Melinda quickly left in a bad mood. Later, Ricky announced that he and Melinda had split up, and Bianca told Pat that Melinda was responsible for Ricky's lack of contact with their son Liam Butcher (James Forde).

An EastEnders source told Digital Spy: "Ricky returns to the Square for his dad Frank's funeral and turns up with Melinda – but is it true love or just a fling between them?"

== Whitney Dean ==
Whitney Dean, played by Shona McGarty, was the adopted daughter of long-running character Bianca Jackson (Patsy Palmer), and was introduced on 1 April 2008 when Palmer returned to the series after a six-year absence. Whitney was described as "a teenage drama queen, unable to engage brain before mouth and constantly finding herself in and out of trouble". Her storylines have revolved around her fractured family life, including her sexual abuse by Bianca's partner Tony King (Chris Coghill), and a sexual exploitation storyline involving Rob Grayson (Jody Latham). The storyline with Tony won EastEnders a Royal Television Society Programme Award in 2008.

== Morgan Butcher ==
Morgan Butcher
- EastEnders character
- Portrayed by: Devon Higgs
- Duration: 2008–2014, 2016
- First appearance: Episode 3553; 1 April 2008
- Last appearance: Episode 5830; 4 November 2016
- Introduced by: Diederick Santer (2008); Sean O'Connor (2016)
- Spin-off appearances: Last Tango in Walford (2010); EastEnders: E20 (2010)
In-universe information
- Other names: Morgan Jackson-King
- Family: Beale/Jackson
- Father: Ray Dixon
- Mother: Bianca Jackson
- Stepfather: Ricky Butcher
- Half-brothers: Liam Butcher
- Half-sisters: Tiffany Butcher; Sasha Dixon; Whitney Dean (adoptive)
- Grandfathers: David Wicks
- Grandmothers: Carol Jackson
- Uncles: Joe Wicks; Robbie Jackson; Billie Jackson
- Aunts: Sonia Fowler
- Nieces: Dolly Dean-Hudson (adoptive)
- First cousins: Bex Fowler; Sami Jackson; Julia Fowler; Holly
- Other relatives: Pat Butcher; Jim Branning; Pete Beale; Derek Branning; Max Branning; Jack Branning; Simon Wicks; Ian Beale; Steven Beale; Lucy Beale; Peter Beale; Bobby Beale

Morgan Butcher (also Jackson-King), played by Devon Higgs, is the son of Bianca Jackson (Patsy Palmer) and Ray Dixon (Chucky Venn). He made his first appearance on 1 April 2008 but was not credited in the role until 8 September 2009. He left in 2014, along with his mother and half-sister Tiffany Butcher (Maisie Smith). Morgan made an unannounced return on 3 November 2016 when he and Tiffany returned for their adoptive sister Whitney Dean (Shona McGarty) and Lee Carter's (Danny Hatchard) wedding.

=== Storylines ===
Morgan, his mother Bianca and siblings Liam Butcher (James Forde), Tiffany, and Whitney were evicted by their landlord. After the family slept at a bus shelter and Bianca assaulted a police officer, Morgan and his siblings spent a week in care before the family moved to Walford, where they moved in with his maternal great-grandmother Pat Evans (Pam St Clement). A family party was held where Morgan and his half-siblings met their extended family. Bianca entered Morgan into a Beautiful Baby Competition at The Queen Victoria public house but was forced to withdraw him due to his age. A few days later he celebrated his third birthday at a restaurant with his family. It was initially thought that Morgan was the son of Bianca's partner, Tony King (Chris Coghill), but his ethnicity made it clear that this was not the case after Tony was released from prison. Bianca said Morgan was the result of a one-night stand with an unknown man, but had always seen Tony as his father.

Morgan became ill and was diagnosed by Dr. Poppy Merritt (Amy Darcy) with chicken pox. Pat had to move out briefly, as she had never had the illness. When Tony was arrested for having a sexual relationship with Whitney, Morgan started asking for his dad. The family made up an excuse as he was too young to understand what Tony had done. Janine Butcher (Charlie Brooks) and Ryan Malloy (Neil McDermott) used Morgan to raise money for their rent, pretending they were his parents and were collecting money for a new playground. While trying to make a sandwich, Morgan accidentally squirted tomato ketchup on a hoody belonging to his recently deceased uncle, Billie Jackson (Devon Anderson). Liam hid it and later tried to wash the stain out but their maternal grandmother Carol Jackson (Lindsey Coulson) saw it and slapped him. Morgan started to follow Liam around, fearing he would die as well, but Ricky and Janine reassured him. He ran away from home after Bianca was jailed but was found. Morgan started asking questions about his father so Bianca told him his father was Barack Obama. Knowing the truth, Whitney secretly took Morgan to see Ray Dixon (Chucky Venn), his real father. Ray did not know about Morgan's existence and was delighted to meet his son. Whitney begged Morgan not to tell Bianca that he had met his father. Ray came to Walford to see Morgan but Bianca tried to hide him, before realising they had already met. She did not want Ray to have contact with Morgan until Whitney convinced her, and they spent time together. Bianca allowed Ray to cook a meal for the family but told him to leave when he mentioned his daughter, Sasha Dixon (Rebecca Sanneh). Morgan met Sasha but Bianca was furious when she found out.

Realising that Bianca was having financial difficulties, Tiffany and Morgan went to see their step-great-grandmother Dot Branning (June Brown) at the launderette. She told them that when she had problems as a child, she felt better after a bath. Tiffany and Morgan then decide to run a bath for Bianca but leave the taps on when they go out. When they get home, the bath has overflowed and is leaking into the living room. Bianca is later caught stealing money and returns to prison, this time in Suffolk. Morgan and his family then moves to Suffolk to be near his mother, leaving his father in Walford. He returns for Janine's wedding to Michael Moon (Steve John Shepherd), along with Ricky, Tiffany and Ricky's sister Diane Butcher (Sophie Lawrence). Ricky and Ray argue over Morgan but eventually reconcile before Ricky and Morgan leave again. Morgan returns to Walford with his family for when Bianca is released from prison but is saddened when his father moves away. He is also not pleased when Bianca returns from a trip to Manchester announces that her new boyfriend, Terry Spraggan (Terry Alderton), and his children, TJ (George Sargeant) and Rosie (Jerzey Swingler), are moving in. The couple split up but later reunite and decide to move to Milton Keynes, taking Tiffany, Morgan, TJ and Rosie with them.

Morgan and Tiffany return in November 2016 for Whitney's wedding to Lee. They tell her that Bianca cannot make it to the wedding because she is ill. Morgan offends Babe Smith (Annette Badland) by heaving over her food. Morgan attends the wedding and leaves again with Tiffany after the reception.

=== Development ===
Morgan is described by the Daily Mirror as "the most spoilt out of all of the [Jackson] kids. He's a boisterous, adventurous lad and can hold his own among Bianca's rabble. Morgan only eats chicken nuggets". Morgan is the result of a one-night stand between Bianca and a man who is unknown to viewers. The man his family thinks is his father, Tony King is serving a prison sentence for assaulting a teenager who had allegedly threatened Morgan's stepsister, Whitney Dean (Shona McGarty), though it is found out that Tony is not his biological father. Morgan along with Bianca, Liam, Whitney and Tiffany, have been called 'The Jackson Five' In 2011, the character of Ray Dixon was announced, played by Chucky Venn, who was to play Morgan's biological father.

In April 2014, Palmer announced she was leaving EastEnders and in July 2014, the departure of Higgs and Smith was announced. Show bosses said that whilst they are "sad" about them leaving after six years, the decision "was right for the Butcher family as Bianca would never leave her youngest children behind." Vicky Prior from Metro commented that Morgan "recently proved an excellent comedy partner for Tiffany" and was "looking forward to seeing these two grow in character and also as actors."

== Tiffany Butcher ==
Tiffany Butcher (also Dean), played by Maisie Smith, is the daughter of long-running character Bianca Jackson (Patsy Palmer), introduced on 1 April 2008 when Palmer returned to the series after a six-year absence. Tiffany is described as having a "cute, butter-wouldn't-melt exterior", which "masks her somewhat mature understanding of adult matters. She sees all, hears all and knows all". She is also described as "a troublesome and cheeky lass" with a "feisty, red-head personality, which she no doubt inherits from screenmum [sic] Bianca". For her portrayal of Tiffany, Smith won the 'Best Dramatic Performance for a Young Actor or Actress' award at the British Soap Awards in 2009.

== Lucas Johnson ==
Lucas Johnson, played by Don Gilet, is the estranged father of established character Chelsea Fox (Tiana Benjamin) and ex-husband of Denise Fox (Diane Parish), who he later remarries. He has a son, Jordan (Michael-Joel David Stuart), from his previous relationship with Trina Johnson (Sharon Duncan-Brewster). His profile on the official EastEnders website describes him as "an upstanding member of the community, a far cry from the youth he once was." His storylines include causing Trina's death and covering it up, murdering Denise's ex-husband Owen Turner (Lee Ross), and attempting to kill Denise. For his portrayal of Lucas, Gilet has received several award nominations, including Serial Drama Performance at the 2011 National Television Awards. He appeared from 3 April 2008 to 30 July 2010 and again from 1 January to 10 March 2016.

== Opal Smith ==
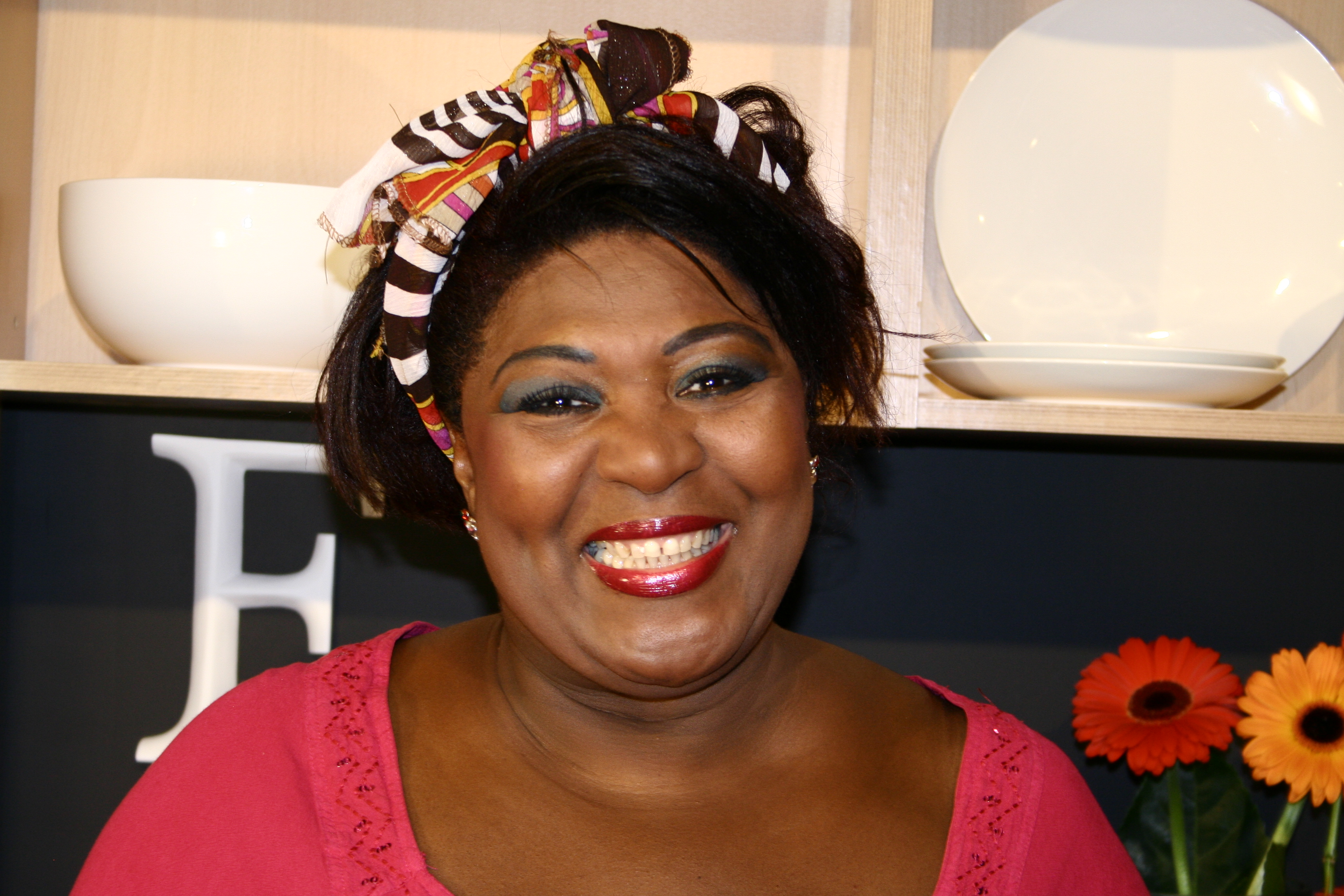
Rustie Lee, who played Opal Smith.

Opal Smith, played by Rustie Lee, is the aunt of Gus Smith (Mohammed George) and Juley Smith (Joseph Kpobie). She was introduced in February 2008 for two episodes, on 8 and 10 April 2008. Opal is first mentioned on screen in May 2007, when Gus has to go to Wolverhampton to look after her following a fall. In April 2008 she visits Gus out of the blue, as she has a coach ticket to use. She embarrasses him by assuming that he is dating Keisha (Suzie McGrath), and later gives him his mother's engagement ring.

She was described as "the fiery aunt" by What's on TV and "the loud battle axe aunty of Gus" by BBC Birmingham. Speaking of her arrival, Lee said, "I'm absolutely over the moon to think I'm going to be in the Square. I can't wait." She said the opportunity was tremendous and brilliant as she had always wanted to appear in EastEnders.

== Inzamam Ahmed ==
Inzamam Ahmed
- EastEnders character
- Portrayed by: Paul Bhattacharjee
- Duration: 2008, 2010
- First appearance: Episode 3577; 13 May 2008
- Last appearance: Episode 3924; 1 January 2010
- Introduced by: Diederick Santer
In-universe information
- Brothers: Masood Ahmed; AJ Ahmed
- Wife: Fatima Inzamam
- Sons: Ali Inzamam
- Daughters: Jamila Inzamam
- Uncles: Arshad Ahmed
- Nephews: Syed Masood; Tamwar Masood; Kamil Masood
- Nieces: Shabnam Masood
- Other relatives: Iqra Ahmed; Habiba Ahmed

Inzamam Ahmed, played by Paul Bhattacharjee, is the brother of Masood Ahmed (Nitin Ganatra). He first appears on 13 May 2008, and returns on 1 January 2010 for the wedding of Masood's son Syed Masood (Marc Elliott) and Amira Shah (Preeya Kalidas).

Inzamam first visits Walford to check up on his brother's family while Masood is in Karachi visiting their sick father. He is rude and sexist towards Masood's wife Zainab Masood (Nina Wadia) and daughter Shabnam Masood (Zahra Ahmadi), but praises his son Tamwar Masood's (Himesh Patel) achievements. He is shocked to see that Jay Brown (Jamie Borthwick) has graffitied "Shabnam is a hore [sic]" on the Masoods' wall. He later meets up with Zainab, and she asks him for money. He makes a sexual advance to her, and she leaves, forcing her to consider selling her house. On the day before Syed's wedding to Amira, Masood takes Inzamam to dinner to ask if he can help with some money. Inzamam does not know who is getting married as nobody has told him about it and also does not know that Zainab is pregnant. Masood asks Zainab why she did not invite Inzamam to the wedding and she says she forgot, but he realises she did it deliberately. She tells him that Inzamam sees her as a fallen woman as she was previously married to Yusef Khan (Ace Bhatti) when she met Masood, and Imzamam made many advances toward her. Masood orders Inzamam to stand and tells him that he knows what he has done. Masood returns Inzamam's money and says he is not invited to the wedding and is not welcome in their home and he walks out of their house with his wife, Fatima (Anu Hasan) and children Ali (Omar Kent) and Jamila (Sara Aisha Kent).

In May 2015, Fatima returns to Walford after being contacted by Shabnam, and reveals to Masood that she and Inzamam have separated and Inzamam has moved back to Pakistan.

== Jamila and Ali Inzamam ==
Jamila Inzamam and Ali Inzamam
- EastEnders character
- Portrayed by: Sara Aisha Kent (Jamila); Omar Kent (Ali)
- Duration: 2008, 2010
- First appearance: Episode 3577; 13 May 2008
- Last appearance: Episode 3924; 1 January 2010
- Introduced by: Diederick Santer
In-universe information
- Father: Inzamam Ahmed
- Mother: Fatima Inzamam
- Brothers: Ali Inzamam
- Sisters: Jamila Inzamam
- Uncles: Masood Ahmed; AJ Ahmed
- First cousins: Syed Masood; Shabnam Masood; Tamwar Masood; Kamil Masood

Jamila Inzamam, played by Sara Aisha Kent and Ali Inzamam played by Omar Kent, are the children of Inzamam Ahmed (Paul Bhattacharjee) and Fatima Inzamam, and nephew and niece of Inzamam's brother Masood Ahmed (Nitin Ganatra). They make their first appearance on 13 May 2008, when they and their father attend a meal with Masood's wife Zainab Masood (Nina Wadia) and her children, Shabnam Masood (Zahra Ahmadi) and Tamwar Masood (Himesh Patel), as their father wants to check up on his brother's family. They return on 1 January 2010 for Syed Masood (Marc Elliott) and Amira Shah's (Preeya Kalidas) wedding. along with their father and mother Fatima Inzamam, when they are due to attend Syed and Amira's wedding, but they leave with their parents after Masood tells Inzamam he is not welcome. Unlike Inzamam and Ali, Jamila and Fatima are not credited in this appearance.

In May 2015, Fatima returns to Walford and reveals that she and Inzamam have separated and Inzamam has moved back to Pakistan, so only Ali is living with her. It is implied that Jamila went to live with either her father or another relative.

== Jordan Johnson ==
Jordan Johnson
- EastEnders character
- Portrayed by: Michael-Joel David Stuart (2008–2010); Joivan Wade (2016)
- Duration: 2008–2010, 2016
- First appearance: Episode 3583; 23 May 2008
- Last appearance: Episode 5256; 1 April 2016
- Introduced by: Diederick Santer (2008); Dominic Treadwell-Collins (2016)
In-universe information
- Occupation: Student
- Father: Lucas Johnson
- Mother: Trina Johnson
- Stepmother: Denise Fox
- Half-sisters: Chelsea Fox
- Sons: JJ Johnson
- Aunts: Gloria MacDonald
- Nephews: Jordan Fox

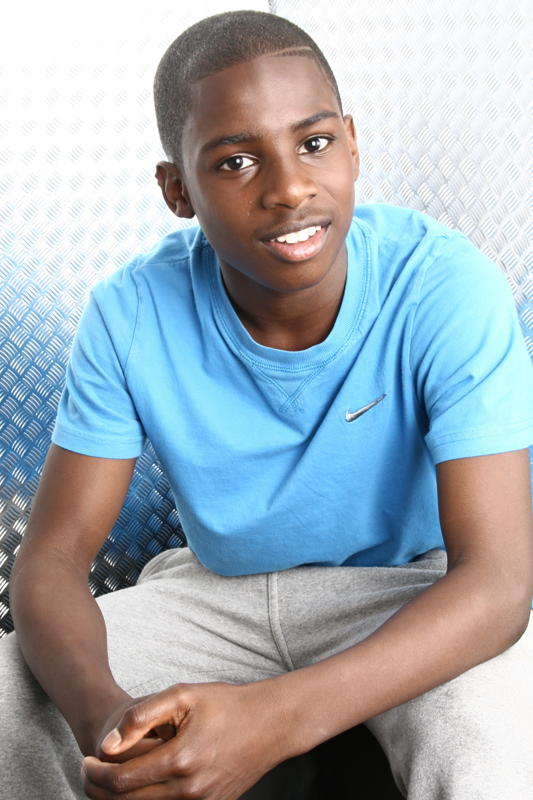
Michael-Joel David Stuart who played Jordan Johnson between 2008 and 2010.

Jordan Johnson, played by Michael-Joel David Stuart from 2008 to 2010 and Joivan Wade in 2016, is the son of Lucas Johnson (Don Gilet) and the half-brother of Chelsea Fox (Tiana Benjamin), who arrives on Chelsea's birthday with his father. He is described on the EastEnders website as a "cheeky chap" who "lights up the room with his winning smile". He is also described as a "talented boy who works hard at school". He first appears on 23 May 2008, and leaves on 21 December 2010. On 9 January 2016, it was announced Jordan would be returning with Joivan Wade taking over the role, and he made his first appearance on 8 February 2016. He appeared until 10 March 2016 when he was arrested for trying to help Lucas escape from prison. He made a further guest appearance on 1 April 2016.

When Lucas arrives in Walford, he tells Chelsea's mother Denise Fox (Diane Parish) that Jordan's mother Trina (Sharon Duncan Brewster) abandoned him shortly after he was born. He was in an incubator, addicted to heroin, as Trina was a drug addict. When Yolande Trueman (Angela Wynter) tries to get Chelsea to bond with Jordan, he finds cocaine in her handbag. Chelsea claims it is sherbet but Jordan is not deceived and tells her that their father helps drug addicts. When Jordan forgets his key to Lucas's flat, Yolande takes him to her B&B. Denise is not pleased that he is there but eventually enjoys his company. Jordan leaves with his father after locals blame him for Tony King (Chris Coghill) being allowed to work with children. Jordan and Lucas return a month later and stay at the B&B before preparing to leave for Leeds.

After Denise proposes to Lucas, Jordan reveals that Lucas is still married to Trina. Unknown to Jordan and Denise, Trina had been looking for Lucas and he knows her whereabouts. She asks about Jordan and says she is no longer addicted to drugs, and he says he is going to marry Denise. Eventually, Jordan and Trina bond, but he is unhappy that Trina is excluded from a family holiday. He tells Trina about the holiday and she arrives to try to stop it. Jordan becomes friends with Ben Mitchell (Charlie Jones) and Abi Branning (Lorna Fitzgerald). Trina is killed while trying to seduce Lucas, and he leaves her in a shed on the allotment. Jordan tries to contact her on her mobile phone as she has promised to contact him. Jordan and Abi discover her body when they volunteer to clean the shed for Charlie Slater (Derek Martin). They decide to raise funds for a tree to be planted in Trina's memory in Albert Square's gardens, but unknown to everyone, Lucas murders Denise's ex-husband Owen Turner (Lee Ross) and buries his corpse under the tree.

Ben dares Jordan to drink alcohol that Ben stole from his family's pub. Lucas catches him and threatens to get Ben's father Phil Mitchell (Steve McFadden) involved but Jordan insists it was his idea and nothing to do with Ben. Jordan is annoyed when he sees Ben's sister Louise kicking Trina's tree and she later blames him for locking her in a shed when it was actually Ben. Jordan swears on the bible that he did not do it, so Lucas believes him, and he tells Phil that he thinks Ben did it. This eventually turns out to be true, and Ben reveals that Jordan has been bullying him, so Phil and Lucas leave them with Minty Peterson (Cliff Parisi) to help them bond. After Minty leaves them alone, Jordan insults Ben, so Ben throws him to the ground and attacks him with a spanner, leaving him there. The next day he is found by Phil and taken to hospital where he is left in a coma with a fractured skull. Wracked with guilt, Ben confesses to the police that he attacked Jordan, while Jordan is brought out of his medically induced coma. When he is discharged, his family throw him a party. In Jordan's police statement, he says that Ben attacked him for no reason. However, after Denise is visited by Jane Beale (Laurie Brett), who doesn't believe Ben would attack Jordan for no reason, she talks to Jordan and gets him to reveal that he had been bullying Ben. Jordan then decides to change his statement.

When Owen's corpse is discovered under the tree, Jordan gets upset every time the tree is mentioned and reveals he had a dream where a hand came out of the ground. Lucas promises to get the council to replace the tree. Jordan and Abi argue when he feels she does not care and their friendship ends. He wonders if it is his fault that the people around him are dying. When the truth emerges that Lucas allowed Trina to die, killed Owen and kidnapped Denise, Jordan tries to stick by his father when the rest of the family run out, but then leaves in fear when he discovers that, rather than outright killing Trina, Lucas could have saved her but chose not to. Lucas is then arrested. When Jordan visits Denise with the rest of the family, he does not speak and just clutches his Bible. Finding it hard to come to terms with what has happened, Jordan eventually opens up to Patrick Trueman (Rudolph Walker), crying on his shoulder. The next day he worries that no one will want to be friends with him because they all know about Lucas. However, after he ends his romance with Abi, he is happy that they agree to remain friends. Jordan then says goodbye to his sister Chelsea and Libby, who are moving away after their ordeal in Walford. On his birthday, Jordan receives a card from his father, but asks Ricky Butcher (Sid Owen) to throw it away, and says he has to now look after Denise. However, Jordan is unable to speak to Denise about Lucas, so stays in contact with his aunt Gloria MacDonald (Michele Austin). Denise discovers they have been in contact for several months and allows Jordan to spend Christmas with her. Jordan is happy at his aunt's house, so Denise reluctantly lets him stay there.

Almost five years later, Denise receives a visit from the police, who say someone in custody has been arrested and given her address as theirs. Eventually, Denise discovers that it is Jordan, and he has been involved in a knife attack and has been released on bail. After learning from Gloria that she hasn't seen Jordan in years and after visiting Lucas in prison following her concerns, Denise decides to track Jordan down. After she gets into contact with him, Jordan arrives in Walford and confronts her in the gardens, warning her to leave him alone. Denise's sister Kim Fox-Hubbard (Tameka Empson) sees Jordan and hits him with her bag, cutting him, so Denise takes him home to clean his wound. Kim, Patrick and Kim's husband Vincent Hubbard (Richard Blackwood) are against him staying even though he owes money to people who want to hurt him. Angry, Jordan pushes Denise but then apologies, but Patrick says he is just like Lucas, so Jordan leaves. He is then kicked and beaten by a gang. The next day, Denise hears from police that Jordan is in trouble again, so tracks him down to his squat, where he reveals that it was his girlfriend, Amelle Ellington (Sophia Brown), who took drugs but died from an overdose, and now he has inherited her debt. When Denise returns to Walford, she has brought Jordan back as well and it is revealed that he has a son, JJ Johnson (Zayden Kareem). Vincent pays off the drug debt and Jordan decides to enrol on a carpenter course at college. Jordan visits Lucas in prison when he finds a torn up visiting order and again with Denise, where Lucas tells Jordan he has a plan to get a job in the kitchens and then escape. They persuade Denise to put in a good word so Lucas can get a job and on the day they plan to escape, Jordan takes Paul Coker's (Jonny Labey) car and tries to get Denise to come. Denise tells Jordan that Lucas is poisoning him and she wants to protect him as he is her child like Chelsea and Libby. Jordan gets angry when he finds out the police have been called and Denise persuades him to tell them about Lucas. Jordan is then arrested and held on remand. Denise visits Jordan in prison, having discovered that JJ's mother, Amelle, is alive. Jordan convinces Denise that Amelle is a bad mother, but when Denise meets Amelle, Denise finds out Amelle is not a drug addict and JJ is actually called Jamie. Denise allows JJ to live with Amelle permanently.

In 2021, shortly after Lucas is paroled, he finds out that Jordan has died of a heroin overdose.

== Maggie Townsend ==
Maggie Townsend
- EastEnders character
- Portrayed by: Angeline Ball
- First appearance: Episode 3585; 27 May 2008
- Last appearance: Episode 3594/3595; 11 June 2008
- Introduced by: Diederick Santer
In-universe information
- Occupation: Construction site boss

Margaret "Maggie" Townsend played by Angeline Ball, is Bradley Branning's (Charlie Clements) boss. She takes over off-screen from Alex French (Pippa Hinchley). She made her first appearance on 27 May 2008 and her last on 11 June 2008.

She appears when Sean Slater (Robert Kazinsky) steals a crane from the building site she is in charge of, and later goes on a corporate night out at local nightclub R&R, where Mickey Miller (Joe Swash) flirts with her, and she flirts with Bradley and Jack Branning (Scott Maslen). She also clashes with Chelsea Fox (Tiana Benjamin) and Tanya Branning (Jo Joyner), when Chelsea does her manicure wrong, then shouts at her in the beauty salon. She later invites Bradley to dinner, but he pretends to be ill and does not go, as he is not attracted to her. He confides in Dot Branning (June Brown), who goes to the restaurant without Bradley's knowledge, and argues with Maggie, telling her to "keep her filthy hands to herself." Maggie later sees Bradley at a singles' night at The Queen Victoria public house, and fires him for lying to her. He runs after her when she leaves, and she takes him home and they have sex, but Bradley does not get his job back.

== Olly Greenwood ==
Olly Greenwood
- EastEnders character
- Portrayed by: Bart Edwards
- First appearance: Episode 3592; 9 June 2008
- Last appearance: Episode 3633; 21 August 2008
- Introduced by: Diederick Santer
In-universe information
- Occupation: Student
- Mother: Camilla Greenwood

Oliver "Olly" Greenwood, played by Bart Edwards, is the boyfriend of Lucy Beale (Melissa Suffield). He makes his first appearance on 9 June 2008 and his last on 21 August 2008.

Lucy introduces her father Ian Beale (Adam Woodyatt) to Olly, whom she met when she was homeless and is five years Lucy's senior, and tells Ian that Olly is moving in or she will leave. Lucy tries to antagonise Ian by telling him that she and Olly are getting matching tattoos, and insinuating that they are sexually active, at which point Ian throws Olly out. Lucy later persuades her stepmother Jane Beale's (Laurie Brett) brother, Christian Clarke (John Partridge) to let her use his flat to see Olly. Ian catches Lucy participating in foreplay with Olly, so takes him outside with Olly dressed in his underwear and makes everyone hurl sponges at him during a "Best of British" day on Albert Square. Ian then tells him to leave, which Olly does in an embarrassed state. Olly returns in August 2008 when Lucy throws a party at Christian's flat, then decides to go on the contraceptive pill after pressure from Olly to have sex with him. Ian finds out and visits Olly's mother Camilla Greenwood (Joanna Van Gyseghem), inviting her and Olly to a meal at the Beales' house. Lucy is shocked to learn that Olly is not all he seems; he comes from a privileged background and is expected to attend Oxford or Cambridge University. When this is revealed, Ian tries to set Lucy up for life by seeking Camilla's approval of Olly and Lucy's relationship. However, Camilla storms out of the house, followed by Olly.

=== Development ===
19-year-old Edwards was cast in the role after being seen in a musical by one of the directors of EastEnders. The casting was announced on 13 May 2008, when he was described as "mysterious". Speaking of his casting, Edwards said, "It is just amazing. Everybody is lovely on the set. I watch EastEnders... but I never expected to be on TV with those people." He described his character as "a laid-back person who takes each day as it comes" and as 'scruffy' by the official EastEnders website. Olly was also dubbed "the son of Swampy.

== Brenda Boyle ==
Brenda Boyle
- EastEnders character
- Portrayed by: Carmel Cryan
- Duration: 2008–2009
- First appearance: Episode 3592; 9 June 2008
- Last appearance: Episode 3841; 14 August 2009
- Created by: Diederick Santer
- Introduced by: Diederick Santer
In-universe information
- Brothers: Clive Robinson

Brenda Boyle, played by Carmel Cryan, is introduced as Charlie Slater's (Derek Martin) new love interest. She appears from 9 June 2008 to 14 August 2009.

Jean Slater (Gillian Wright) meets Brenda on a dating website and starts e-mailing her on Charlie's behalf. She visits Walford and Jean is forced to reveal the truth to an unsuspecting Charlie, and Brenda later discovers the deception. She is a member of the Salvation Army and plays the horn. When Shirley Carter (Linda Henry) makes a jokey off-hand comment about Charlie being a womanizer, Brenda leaves Walford, forgetting her horn. She gives Charlie a second chance when she comes to collect it, only to find out that Mo Harris (Laila Morse) has sold it. She participates in a pub quiz with him and his family, and starts a relationship with Charlie, comforting him when he gets a spray tan to impress her and it goes wrong, leaving him orange. He later visits her in Clacton, where she lives.

Brenda buys Charlie a summerhouse for his allotment, but the concrete flooring is smashed by Suzy Branning (Maggie O'Neill), which looks like it will ruin the gift. However, the following day, Charlie sorts the problem so the concrete can be re-laid. Brenda helps raise money for Children in Need in The Queen Victoria but walks out of the pub after Linda Clarke (Lynda Baron) starts flirting with Charlie. On Christmas Day, Sean Slater (Robert Kazinsky) sings the song "Stop The Cavalry" to Roxy Slater (Rita Simons) as a Christmas present, and Brenda and a friend accompany him. When Charlie shared his concerns with Patrick Trueman (Rudolph Walker) that his and Brenda's relationship is moving too slowly, Patrick tells him to invite her to dinner and use candles to make it romantic. Charlie asks Winston (Ulric Browne) for some romantic music but he gives him club music. After this, Charlie gives Brenda some drink but spills it on her. As he wipes it off, he touches her breast and is interrupted by Danielle Jones (Lauren Crace). Brenda reassures Charlie that she has feelings for him but leaves with a worried look on her face.

Brenda is supposed to join Charlie in pottery class, but she calls him to say she cannot make it. This upsets Charlie, making him leave the class. Brenda is seen by Mo with another man, and she takes a picture of them embracing to show Charlie. The man is revealed to be her brother, Clive (Col Farrell). He tells her to tell Charlie about something before it is too late as it will be in two months. Brenda later announces to Charlie that she wants to end their relationship. Mo overhears this and confronts Brenda, who says she is emigrating, but promises to tell Charlie. A day later, Mo tells Charlie, and Brenda confirms she is moving to Madeira with Clive and his family. The couple decides to spend one last day together, and Brenda hints to Charlie that she wants to see more of him in Madeira. Charlie gets the hint at the last moment, and tries to stop the bus Brenda is leaving on. Brenda delays leaving, and the next day, after having a farewell meal in the house, Stacey Slater (Lacey Turner) and Mo give Charlie their blessing to go with Brenda and they leave in a taxi after receiving an emotional farewell. Whilst in Madeira, Charlie and Brenda end their relationship and he returns to Walford with another woman, Orlenda (Mary Tamm).

== Archie Mitchell ==
Archie Mitchell, played by Larry Lamb, is the father of established characters Ronnie (Samantha Womack) and Roxy Mitchell (Rita Simons). He is also a love interest for Peggy Mitchell (Barbara Windsor), his brother's widow. Archie is introduced in a group of episodes filmed on-location in Weymouth, Dorset. The audience learned that Ronnie had given a child up for adoption. Tim Teeman, critic for The Times, has described Archie as "a thousand times more terrifying than [EastEnders villain] Nick Cotton" and "a psycho in a golf jersey." Dominic Treadwell-Collins has described him as "the worst villain that Albert Square has ever seen". He made his first appearance on 8 July 2008. After originally leaving Walford following the revelation of his true character and evil capabilities, Archie returns on 9 July 2009, and his last appearance is as a corpse on 28 December 2009 after being murdered by Stacey Slater (Lacey Turner).

== Danielle Jones ==
Danielle Jones, played by Lauren Crace, is introduced as a love interest for fellow new character Callum Monks (Elliott Jordan). It is later revealed that Danielle is the long-lost daughter of Ronnie Mitchell (Samantha Womack), and therefore a member of the soap's long-running Mitchell family. Her introduction was planned from 2007, when story producer Dominic Treadwell-Collins conceived the idea of two new Mitchell sisters, Ronnie and Roxy (Rita Simons). Danielle appears from 18 August 2008 to 3 April 2009, after she is run over and killed by Janine Butcher (Charlie Brooks). Her final episode was watched by 11.46 million viewers, and caused a notable power surge on the National Grid.

== Callum Monks ==
Callum Monks
- EastEnders character
- Portrayed by: Elliott Jordan
- Duration: 2008–2009
- First appearance: Episode 3631; 18 August 2008
- Last appearance: Episode 3749; 6 March 2009
- Introduced by: Diederick Santer
In-universe information
- Father: Vinnie Monks
- Half-sisters: Hayley Monks

Callum Monks, played by Elliott Jordan, made his first appearance on 18 August 2008 and his last on 6 March 2009.

Arriving in Walford in search of his father Vinnie (Bobby Davro), Callum is instantly attracted to Stacey Branning (Lacey Turner). Unperturbed by her rejections, Callum attempts to woo Stacey, despite discovering that she is married. He briefly dates Stacey's friend Danielle Jones (Lauren Crace), but only to make Stacey jealous. Stacey continues to reject Callum, but after her husband Bradley Branning (Charlie Clements) angers her one night, she kisses Callum. Realizing that her marriage is over, Stacey finishes with Bradley, allowing a casual relationship with Callum to begin. Their romance does not last, as Callum cannot bear to be around Stacey's mother Jean Slater (Gillian Wright), who has bipolar disorder. Blaming Jean for the relationship's demise, Callum aggressively tells her that she is ruining her daughter's life. When Stacey discovers this, she punches Callum and he reveals that his mother, who was also mentally ill, used to abuse him and lock him in cupboards when he was a child. He has scars on his legs from an incident where his mother attacked him with a wire coat hanger at the age of ten. Due to this and realizing that Stacey would never leave Jean, Callum declares there is nothing left for him in Walford. He bids a final goodbye to Stacey and leaves to pursue Vinnie, who has already departed. The EastEnders website showed that Callum went to live with his father in Southend.

=== Development ===
It was announced on 26 June 2008 that a new character, Callum, would be introduced to EastEnders as the son of already-established Vinnie. Callum was described as a "lothario". The role was given to Elliott Jordan, who had previously appeared in EastEnders in August 2005 as Gavin, an acquaintance of Leo Taylor (Philip Dowling). Of his casting, Jordan said: "I am thrilled and really excited to be joining EastEnders. Callum is a great part to play, and I can't wait for him to make his mark in Walford." He also said it was an "honour". EastEnders' executive producer, Diederick Santer, commented: "Callum [...] will bring a breath of fresh air to Walford. Bright, twinkly, and with the gift of the gab, he'll get the women of Walford all of a flutter." Describing his character, Jordan said, "he's a very laid back and easy-going character. He doesn't think too far ahead. He's a bit of a Casanova, definitely a jack the lad. He's very confident and streetwise and he reads people and situations very well, which allows him to get what he wants." Jordan said that one of the writers told him that Callum reminded him of Vincent Chase in Entourage.

Callum was listed by Ladbrokes as a contender for the father of Heather Trott's (Cheryl Fergison) baby, and was ranked by them as an outsider with odds of 16/1. He was also named by website Digital Spy as a possible suspect in Max Branning's (Jake Wood) hit-and-run. It was reported on 20 January 2009 that the character was to depart from the series in March 2009. An EastEnders insider told Digital Spy, "Viewers will learn a little more about Callum before he leaves Albert Square behind." Speaking of his departure, Jordan said: "I've had a really great time at EastEnders and I've enjoyed working with all the cast. I've loved every minute of it and I'm looking forward to trying new things."

== Tony King ==
Tony King, played by Chris Coghill, is the partner of established character Bianca Jackson (Patsy Palmer), and a father-figure to her four children. He made his first appearance on 12 September 2008. It was reported in July 2008 that Tony would be arriving in the serial as part of a child sexual abuse storyline involving Bianca's adopted daughter Whitney Dean (Shona McGarty). BBC News described the plot as an ongoing "predatory paedophile storyline", noting that this was the first time this subject matter had been tackled by a UK soap opera. The Daily Mirror's Beth Neil branded the plot strand "one of the darkest and most disturbing storylines EastEnders has ever attempted", with critic Jim Shelley deeming it to be a "new low" for EastEnders. Tony sexually abuses Whitney, and begins grooming her school-friend Lauren Branning (Madeline Duggan), before his predatory nature is uncovered and he is arrested for his crimes. Tony appeared between 12 September and 12 December 2008 and returned in December 2009 to stand trial. The NSPCC praised the storyline for "helping to raise awareness of the hidden nature of sexual abuse". The storyline also gained EastEnders a Royal Television Society Programme Award in March 2009 in the Soap and Continuing Drama category.

== Amir Khan ==
Amir Khan
- EastEnders character
- Portrayed by: Alton Letto
- First appearance: Episode 3651; 22 September 2008
- Last appearance: Episode 3678; 6 November 2008
- Introduced by: Diederick Santer
In-universe information
- Occupation: Estate agent

Amir Khan, played by Alton Letto, is an estate agent and colleague of Bradley Branning (Charlie Clements). He appears between 22 September and 6 November 2008. He attends a sales pitch with Bradley, and they sell all the flats available. To celebrate, they go to Fargo's restaurant, and are joined by Bradley's wife Stacey Slater (Lacey Turner). Amir tells Bradley and Stacey that he has two children, and has booked an adventure holiday with his wife as they have not had time away from the children for two years. He receives a telephone call from his wife telling him one of the children is ill, and is forced to cancel the holiday. This makes Stacey realize that she does not want children at the time as she feels she is too young. Bradley and Stacey take Amir and his wife's places on the holiday. Amir later shows Sean Slater (Robert Kazinsky) and his wife Roxy (Rita Simons) a home, and is supposed to go inside and show them round, but Sean intimidates him into staying outside.

== Poppy Merritt ==
Poppy Merritt
- EastEnders character
- Portrayed by: Amy Darcy
- Duration: 2008–2009
- First appearance: Episode 3651; 22 September 2008
- Last appearance: Episode 3780; 30 April 2009
- Introduced by: Diederick Santer
In-universe information
- Occupation: Trainee pathologist

Doctor Poppy Merritt played by Amy Darcy, is the general practitioner for Walford, succeeding May Wright. She made her first appearance on 22 September 2008, and her last on 30 April 2009.

Poppy is first seen diagnosing Morgan Jackson-King (Devon Higgs) with chicken pox, and she assumes Morgan's mother Bianca Jackson (Patsy Palmer) is married to Tony King (Chris Coghill), which puts the idea of marriage in Bianca's head. She sees Dot Branning (June Brown) when she has food poisoning, and connects it to un-chilled food sold by Patrick Trueman (Rudolph Walker) at his shop, the Minute Mart. She says it is her duty to report Patrick and his wife Yolande Trueman (Angela Wynter) to environmental health. Whilst cycling past Pat Evans's (Pam St Clement) house, she sees Bianca shouting at her adopted daughter Whitney Dean (Shona McGarty) for being miserable. Poppy tries to talk to Whitney, who admits to feeling suicidal so Poppy tells Bianca that Whitney should see to a psychiatrist. Bianca disagrees initially but after realizing Whitney needs professional help, she agrees and Poppy refers Whitney to a psychiatrist. The next day, Poppy leaves Bianca a message asking her to rearrange the psychiatrist's appointment after Whitney fails to attend.

Poppy receives an emergency call-out to check on pregnant Roxy Slater (Rita Simons) after she has a fall at Walford East tube station. Later, Poppy tells Roxy that she and her baby are fine. Later, a removal van is seen outside the surgery with a man removing the placard with Poppy's name on it. Poppy helps Heather Trott (Cheryl Fergison) after she has an asthma attack, and notices her breasts are sore so advises that Heather go to a clinic, which she does and finds out she's pregnant. Poppy leaves Walford to retrain as a pathologist.

== Lee Thompson ==
Lee Thompson
- EastEnders character
- Portrayed by: Carl Ferguson
- First appearance: Episode 3657; 2 October 2008
- Last appearance: Episode 3662; 10 October 2008
- Introduced by: Diederick Santer

Lee Thompson played by Carl Ferguson, was a former school friend of Ronnie Mitchell (Samantha Womack). It was revealed in October 2008 that Ferguson would be playing the part and the role would see him 'become involved in a tangled love affair'. He appeared from 2 to 10 October 2008.

He first appeared when Ronnie attended a school reunion, with Christian Clarke (John Partridge) posing as her husband. Lee revealed he is the best friend of Joel Reynolds (Cavan Clerkin), the father of Ronnie's daughter. He revealed that Joel knew about the school reunion but wouldn't be coming. Lee also realized that Christian was not Ronnie's husband and was in fact gay, so slid his own contact details into Christian's blazer pocket. Christian later went out for a drink with him and got Joel's contact details for Ronnie. Over the next few days Lee and Christian started a relationship, this was thanks to Christian's sister Jane Beale (Laurie Brett) sending Lee a text from Christian's phone. A few days into this relationship, Lee said that he was surprised he was attracted to Christian, as he tended to prefer younger men. They later kiss but are told by Dot Branning (June Brown) that she is as liberal as the next person, but does not approve of canoodling in public places. Christian later invited Lee for a lunch with some 'friends', Jane and Roxy Mitchell (Rita Simons), who had both insisted on meeting Lee. However, Lee ended up being rude to both Jane and Roxy, and later left while Christian was out buying wine, telling Jane and Roxy that Christian was too old for him and they ended their relationship.

=== Reception ===
After screening the kiss on 7 October 2008 between Lee and Christian 145 complaints were made after screening the kiss before the watershed. Writing on the Points of View message board, one viewer said: "I am appalled by the display of homosexual kissing before the watershed shown on EastEnders. This is disgraceful whilst young children are watching and sets the wrong example." Though one viewer said, "I don't see what the fuss is about, given the context of their kissing and messing about and the way it was portrayed." The BBC defended it though saying,

'EastEnders aims to reflect real life, and this means including and telling stories about characters from many different backgrounds, faiths, religions and sexualities."We approach our portrayal of homosexual relationships in the same way as we do heterosexual relationships. In this instance, Christian is enjoying the first flush of romance and we've shown him being affectionate with his new boyfriend in the same way any couple would."We also aim to ensure that depictions of affection or sexuality between couples are suitable for pre-watershed viewing. We believe that the general tone and content of EastEnders is now widely recognised, meaning that parents can make an informed decision as to whether they want their children to watch.'

Gareth McLean from The Guardian defended the kiss saying, Who are the people that complain about gay kissing in EastEnders? Don't they have anything better to do? Other than sell their daughters into slavery, kill their neighbour for working the Sabbath and stone infidels, I mean. ("Day 44 in the Old Testament House and it's time to burn a witch!"). Every time there's a bit of man-on-man kissage in Walford, the BBC gets complaints that "this filth", or words to that effect, shouldn't be on the telly. "How do I explain this to my child?" runs the gist of some of the gripes. He finished of saying 'Let's congratulate the BBC'.

== Stuart Turner ==
Stuart Turner
- EastEnders character
- Portrayed by: Ray MacAllan
- First appearance: Episode 3671; 27 October 2008
- Last appearance: Episode 3681; 11 November 2008
- Introduced by: Diederick Santer
In-universe information
- Occupation: Detective

Detective Inspector Stuart Turner played by Ray MacAllan, first arrived in Walford along with Kenny Morris (Ryan Philpott) after Max Branning (Jake Wood) reported a burglary at his home. He made his first appearance on 27 October and his last on 11 November 2008.

After Sergeant Morris found bullet holes in the wall, Max said that they were the work of his brother Jack Branning (Scott Maslen). This however turned out to be a ploy of his to prevent Jack moving away to France with Max's wife Tanya Branning (Jo Joyner) and their three children. As a result, Jack was arrested for attempted murder, but was later released due to lack of evidence. The gun had been found by Turner, however he later met Jack and handed the gun over to him, as he had respect for him as a former police officer. He later appeared after Max was mowed down by a moving car. He was worried about being discovered for giving Jack the gun, but Jack assured him that he was safe. However, things got worse for him when Samantha Keeble (Alison Newman) turned up and announced that she was taking over the case of the Branning brothers' feud. After Tanya confessed to the hit and run and later refused bail, Jack enlisted DI Turner to help find the witness of Max's hit-and-run. He was reluctant, but after being blackmailed by Jack over his involvement with the "missing" gun, he relented and later revealed that the witness was Stacey Slater (Lacey Turner).

== DCI Samantha Keeble ==
DCI Samantha Keeble
- EastEnders character
- Portrayed by: Alison Newman; Phoebe Rose Gordon (2022 flashback)
- Duration: 2008, 2014–2016, 2022–2023
- First appearance: Episode 3676; 3 November 2008
- Last appearance: Episode 6624; 5 January 2023
- Introduced by: Diederick Santer (2008); Dominic Treadwell-Collins (2014); Jon Sen (2022)
In-universe information
- Occupation: Detective Chief Inspector
- Father: Malcolm Keeble
- Mother: Mrs Keeble

Detective Chief Inspector Samantha Keeble, played by Alison Newman, is a police officer who appears between 3 and 27 November 2008, and then again from 15 July 2014 to 16 June 2016. She returned on 7 January 2022 and departed on 5 January 2023.

Keeble investigates Max Branning's (Jake Wood) hit-and-run. She is angered by his former wife Tanya Branning (Jo Joyner) who does not let her speak to their daughter Abi Branning (Lorna Fitzgerald). Abi was in Max's house and near the "accident" and is a key witness. In July 2014, Keeble takes over the investigation into the murder of Lucy Beale (Hetti Bywater) (see Who Killed Lucy Beale?), and interviews Billy Mitchell (Perry Fenwick) about an argument he had with Lucy on the night she died. The following day, Keeble visits Ian Beale (Adam Woodyatt) and brother Peter Beale (Ben Hardy) informing them of Jake Stone's (Jamie Lomas) release from custody after the case against him is dropped and admitting that the investigation has stalled, and asks him to participate in a televised appeal for information from the public about the murder. At the appeal, she highlights details of the case to the assembled reporters and plays CCTV footage of Lucy on a bus on the night she died. When reporter Beth Kennedy (Jordan Baker) upsets Ian by asking questions about Lucy's drug using, Phil Mitchell (Steve McFadden), who had seen Keeble talking to Kennedy before the press conference, thinks that Keeble believes Ian is hiding something, which is why she allowed the questioning. Two days later, Ian and Peter visit Keeble to be told that they have received new leads from members of the public about a man seen getting off the bus at the same stop as Lucy. Keeble speaks to Jay Brown (Jamie Borthwick) having identified him as the man from the bus.

In October, with DC Emma Summerhayes (Anna Acton), she bumps into Max as he is leaving Ian's house. Summerhayes is surprised to discover Max and Keeble know each other. Keeble informs Ian that they had traced and eliminated all the witnesses from the bus. Keeble takes Summerhayes off the case, after discovering that she has been having a sexual relationship with Max. Keeble tells Summerhayes that she has jeopardised the murder investigation and faces an investigation by the force's professional standards department. Keeble visits Max when he complains about a reporter stalking his daughter Lauren (Jacqueline Jossa). Keeble assures Max that the police have spoken to the so-called journalist, who is actually DS Cameron Bryant (Glen Wallace), and told him to back off. Keeble then warns Summerhayes, telling her not to put her police career at any further risk by remaining with Max.

Keeble and Bryant later arrest Max for Lucy's murder, and they find her blood on his shoes. Max is found guilty after his trial but escapes the court. He soon realises that Bobby Beale (Eliot Carrington) killed Lucy and tries to pass this information on to the police, but they dismiss it as an act of desperation, and take him back into custody, and he is sentenced to 21 years in prison. Bobby later confesses to the police that he killed Lucy, but Keeble is reluctant to reopen the case. She is stunned when Bobby says he still has the murder weapon. Bobby is later sentenced to three years for killing Lucy. Keeble is later shocked when she discovers that Ian has known Bobby was Lucy's murderer since his wedding day. However, she chooses not to do anything about it and simply wishes him good luck. When she is confronted, she says that everyone has made mistakes in the murder investigation and insists that the case is well and truly over.

Keeble returns in 2022 when Phil is arrested in connection to the murder of Vincent Hubbard (Richard Blackwood). She offers Phil a deal, wherein he must become a police informant if he wishes to avoid life imprisonment. Phil falsely tells her that he will accept the deal in exchange for one international phone call to his sister Sam Mitchell (Kim Medcalf). Keeble is furious when Phil does not honour his side of the deal, but when his life is at risk in prison, she promises to get Phil out if he accepts and keeps to the deal. He seemingly does and he is released. However, unbeknownst to Keeble, Phil plans to find evidence against her while agreeing to her demands. When Phil is released, he finds out that his son Ben Mitchell (Max Bowden) was raped by Lewis Butler (Aidan O'Callaghan), and asks Keeble to frame Lewis for another crime, since there is not firm evidence to charge him with sexual assault. Keeble refuses, and adds that their deal is one-sided.

In September 2022, Keeble tells Phil that she wants him to inform on Billy. Phil refuses, saying that Billy is his family. In a flashback episode, it is revealed that in 1979, as teenagers, Phil and Billy accompanied Phil's father Eric Mitchell (George Russo) to a warehouse raid. When confronted by a security guard (Christopher Pizzey), Billy was injured. Eric asked Phil to shoot and kill the guard but Phil could not go through with it. As Phil helped Billy out of the warehouse, he heard Eric shoot the guard. It is then revealed that the guard Eric killed was Keeble's father Malcolm and that she has had a personal vendetta against the Mitchells ever since. Keeble threatens Phil that if he does not inform on Billy, then she will come for his fiancée Kat Slater (Jessie Wallace). She also admits to Phil that while she is not interested in Billy, her main agenda is to see Phil inform on his family. In order to save Kat, Phil gives Keeble a statement on Billy but tells Kat later that he plans to retract his statement in court, meanwhile finding evidence against Keeble. He also promises her that if Billy goes to prison, he will kill Keeble. Billy is arrested and released on bail until his trial.

With the help of his nemesis Keanu Taylor (Danny Walters), Phil finds enough evidence to frame Keeble for corruption, but Keeble discovers this, and has Kat and her young son Tommy Moon (Sonny Kendall) kidnapped. She holds them hostage in order to get Phil to dispose of the evidence. She threatens Kat and Tommy with a gun, saying she has nothing left to lose, despite her secretly questioning her own actions. A scuffle ensues between Kat and Keeble, just as Phil and Keanu arrive to rescue Kat and Tommy. In the scuffle, Keeble is accidentally shot with the gun. Phil pleads to a dying Keeble to drop the case against Billy, in return for him getting her medical attention. Keeble reluctantly does so. As a result, the case against Billy falls apart and he is freed. Meanwhile, in the hospital, Keeble mentions to her doctors that it is time for her to retire from the police force.

Inside Soap praised Keeble's part in Lucy's murder investigation, calling her "flinty" and saying she "brought some proper policing" to the case.

== Kendra Hills-Smythe ==
Kendra Hills-Smythe
- EastEnders character
- Portrayed by: Rebecca Egan
- Duration: 2008–2009
- First appearance: Episode 3681; 11 November 2008
- Last appearance: Episode 3769; 10 April 2009
- Introduced by: Diederick Santer
In-universe information
- Occupation: Solicitor

Kendra Hills-Smythe played by Rebecca Egan, was a solicitor employed by Jack Branning (Scott Maslen) to defend his partner Tanya Branning (Jo Joyner). She first appeared on 11 November and made two brief appearances on 1 December 2008 and 2 January 2009. She returned between the 7 and 10 April 2009.

In the upcoming case, Tanya had been arrested for attempted murder on her estranged husband Max Branning (Jake Wood). Despite promising Jack Tanya's freedom and helping her client in every way she could to see that she would be given bail, she admitted to Jack that Tanya didn't stand a chance of getting released. This proved true when Tanya's bail application was denied later that day. She later appeared, when she visited Tanya in prison to inform her that Max is concerned she is covering for Jack. However, this has been proven incorrect, although it has been revealed that Tanya is covering for her daughter, Lauren Branning (Madeline Duggan) . She returned to accompany Tanya in court, she asked Tanya to think about what her plea would be. When the truth about Lauren was revealed, she asked Kendra to contact social services because she felt that she will only make things worse for her family. She appeared later when she seemingly attended Lauren's court appearance.

== Amy Mitchell ==
Amy Mitchell
- EastEnders character
- Portrayed by: Kamil & Natalia Lipka-Kozanka (2008–2009); Amelie Conway (2010–2014); Abbie Burke (2014–2022); Ellie Dadd (2022–present)
- Duration: 2008–present
- First appearance: Episode 3683; 17 November 2008
- Introduced by: Diederick Santer
In-universe information
- Other names: Amy Slater
- Occupation: Student
- Family: Mitchell/Branning
- Father: Jack Branning
- Mother: Roxy Mitchell
- Stepfather: Sean Slater; Alfie Moon
- Stepmother: Ronnie Mitchell; Denise Fox
- Half-brothers: Ricky Branning; James Branning
- Half-sisters: Penny Branning
- Grandfathers: Jim Branning; Archie Mitchell
- Grandmothers: Reenie Branning; Glenda Mitchell
- Uncles: Derek Branning; Max Branning; Danny Mitchell
- Aunts: April Branning; Carol Jackson; Suzy Branning; Ronnie Mitchell
- Nephews: Ethan Branning-Panesar
- Nieces: Charli Slater
- First cousins: Danielle Jones; James Branning; Matthew Mitchell Cotton; Joey Branning; Alice Branning; Bradley Branning; Lauren Branning; Abi Branning; Oscar Branning; Annie Carter; Bianca Jackson; Robbie Jackson; Sonia Fowler; Billie Jackson; Kevin; Rebecca
- Other relatives: Phil Mitchell; Grant Mitchell; Sam Mitchell; Clive Mitchell; Eric Mitchell; Billy Mitchell; Jamie Mitchell; Ben Mitchell; Mark Fowler; Courtney Mitchell; Louise Mitchell; Raymond Fox; Janet Mitchell; Will Mitchell; Sami Jackson; Liam Butcher; Tiffany Butcher; Morgan Butcher; Bex Fowler; Lola Pearce; Lexi Pearce; Louie Beale; Jimmy Beale; Abi Branning; Stevie Mitchell; Teddy Mitchell; Harry Mitchell

Amy Mitchell (also Slater), played by Kamil Lipka-Kozanka and Natalia Lipka-Kozanka until 2010, Amelie Conway until January 2014, Abbie Burke (Knowles) from March 2014 until June 2022 and Ellie Dadd from August 2022 onwards, is the daughter of Roxy Mitchell (Rita Simons) and Jack Branning (Scott Maslen). She made her first appearance on 17 November 2008, the episode in which she is born. In August 2022, the character was recast. This was done to allow show bosses to tackle more sensitive and grown up storylines in respect of the character. Amy was a recurring cast member from 2008 until 2022, when the character was promoted to series regular and Amy started appearing more frequently from 9 August 2022. For her role as Amy, Dadd was longlisted for "Best Young Performer" at the 2024 Inside Soap Awards.

For the first few weeks of her life, she is raised as the daughter of Roxy's husband Sean Slater (Robert Kazinsky) and was briefly given his surname, as he and Jack are unaware of Amy's true paternity. Amy is born two months premature and is put on a ventilator from birth. She is named after the daughter of Roxy's sister Ronnie Mitchell (Samantha Janus), whom she put up for adoption many years ago. Roxy initially decides to raise Amy with her friend Christian Clarke (John Partridge), after Sean misses Amy's birth but changes her mind when she and Sean reconcile.

Jack asks Roxy for a paternity test, aware that Amy may be his daughter. It transpires that this is so on Christmas Day 2008, when Jack's sister Suzy Branning (Maggie O'Neill) gives Sean the results in a Christmas cracker, which leads to Sean abducting Amy. There is a fierce argument when Sean is found with Amy, which leads to Sean leaving and Amy is returned to Roxy by Sean's sister Stacey Slater (Lacey Turner) on New Year's Day. Jack then spends more time with Amy and Ronnie decides Amy should be Christened and Roxy agrees. Amy's godfather is Christian and her godmother is her step-grandmother Dot Branning (June Brown), although Ronnie is originally meant to be her godmother, but gets drunk and turns up late to the ceremony. Christian and his partner Syed Masood (Marc Elliott) look after Amy for a day and decide that they want a child. While Amy is being looked after by Ronnie, she draws a picture, which upsets Ronnie has Ronnie interprets it as including her son who died. Amy escapes from the house, which leads to everyone discovering Ronnie has been bailed from prison after swapping her dead baby James with Kat Moon's (Jessie Wallace) healthy son Tommy. Amy also escapes when Roxy's boyfriend Michael Moon (Steve John Shepherd) leaves the door open. Amy is almost hit by Carol Jackson's (Lindsey Coulson) car but is saved by Eddie Moon (David Essex). When Amy suffers a fall at home, Roxy thinks nothing of it. Roxy goes on a night out with friends, leaving Ben Mitchell (Joshua Pascoe) babysitting Amy. When he leaves Amy alone for a while to get a DVD from Jack's flat with Jay Brown (Jamie Borthwick), Amy runs herself a bath, gets in and almost drowns. When Ben discovers her, Dr. Yusef Khan (Ace Bhatti) is called and he revives her. Amy is taken to hospital in a critical condition. She recovers, but she is found to have a fracture from her previous fall, so a social worker awards temporary custody of Amy to Jack. Roxy later is allowed to see Amy, whilst a social worker evaluates Roxy's parenting skills. Jack refuses to allow Roxy to see Amy other than at arranged times. A solicitor tells Roxy to dig up as much dirt on Jack and his family as she can, but this does not work as a court grants full custody to Jack. When Roxy's cousin Phil Mitchell (Steve McFadden) has Jack's car crushed, Jack tells Roxy she cannot see Amy until it is replaced. Jack does not allow Roxy to give Amy her gift at Christmas, so Roxy shows Amy her puppet toy through the window, meaning Jack is forced to let Amy see Roxy. Amy starts scratching other children at nursery because of the tension between Roxy and Jack. Eventually, Roxy wins her custody case, though Jack reveals he dropped it because Roxy threatened to report him for fraud, as he forged her signature to get Amy a passport. When Roxy catches head lice, she blames Bianca Butcher's (Patsy Palmer) children, but she finds out she actually caught them from Amy. Amy's father, Jack moves away in October 2013, and Amy lived full-time with Roxy and her fiancé, Alfie Moon (Shane Richie) until the couple separate on their wedding day in November 2013.

On New Year's Day 2014, Amy, Roxy and Ronnie move to Ibiza for an extended break. She returned to Walford a couple of months later with Roxy and Ronnie now played by Abbie Knowles. Amy has a strong personality and can often be quite naughty. In 2015, Roxy reveals that she arranges monthly trips for Amy to go to France to visit Jack. During Christmas, Jack returns to Walford to visit Roxy and Amy, and upon finding out that Roxy's fiancé Dean Wicks (Matt Di Angelo) raped Linda Carter (Kellie Bright), he packs Amy's bags and sends her to Ronnie's house, scolding Roxy for letting Dean control her.

Roxy leaves Amy with Jack in January 2016 after Dean tries to rape her. Jack and Amy temporarily leave Walford but return when Jack decides to move back to the square permanently so he can be with Ronnie. Roxy returns to Walford but when Jack finds out Roxy agreed to be a drug mule and smuggled £10,000 of cocaine into the country, he is reluctant to let Roxy see Amy. Eventually, Ronnie persuades him to let Amy stay in Roxy's flat overnight but while Jay and Roxy argue over the drugs, Amy finds them and her rabbit Hercules dies after eating cocaine. Amy runs away but is soon found by Andy Flynn (Jack Derges). Jack worries that Amy may have taken drugs so takes her to hospital. Amy is fine but upon realising Social Services are going to be involved, Jack threatens to go for full custody of Amy. However he drops the case when he realises how much Roxy has suffered after Dean attacked her.

Roxy begins to feel distant from Amy and tries to do things right for her, deciding she wants Ronnie to adopt Amy. Ronnie reluctantly agrees. On Jack and Ronnie's wedding night, both Ronnie and Roxy drown and die in the hotel swimming pool. Jack does not want Amy to know but she asks questions about their whereabouts, so he confuses her by saying they have "gone away" and will never return. Amy and her half-brother Ricky (Henri Charles) continue to question Jack, so Dot explains to them with sensitivity that they have gone to heaven. Ronnie and Roxy's mother and Amy's maternal grandmother, Glenda Mitchell (Glynis Barber) returns to Walford and convinces Jack not let Amy and Ricky attend their funerals, but he later changes his mind. Jack allows Glenda to move in to help raise Amy, Ricky and Ronnie's young son, Matthew Mitchell Cotton. Jack and Glenda talk to Amy when they find out she has been wetting the bed over Ronnie and Roxy's deaths. When Glenda has Amy's ears pierced like Roxy's, Jack throws Glenda out because he does not want Amy to see Roxy as a role model. Jack hires Ingrid Solberg (Pernille Broch) as an au pair and she fails to connect with Amy and Ricky by preparing a Norwegian meal, but they bond over pizza. At Halloween, Amy, her cousin Janet Mitchell (Grace) and neighbour Riley Taylor (Tom Jacobs) go missing and when a child is hit by Tina Carter's (Luisa Bradshaw-White) car, Jack fears that is it is Amy. The child is revealed to be Janet. Amy is later found with Kim Fox-Hubbard (Tameka Empson).

=== Development ===
Robert Kazinsky who plays Sean Slater teased the Christmas storyline saying, "Sean ultimately deceives Roxy and snatches baby Amy from The Vic. Then there's a whole week of the Mitchells trying to track Sean and Amy down. Sean's holed up in a squat with the baby to give them more time together. He's simply looking after Amy, who's become the most important person in his life. Even if she isn't his child, mentally and emotionally, she is to Sean. Eventually, Sean's found and it all kicks off, culminating in a stunt with an icy lake…" Kazinsky said that he thinks Sean would be a good dad to Amy saying, Sean was 16 when his father died, so for Sean, bringing up baby Amy was a way for him to make it up to his dad – by being the father to Amy that his father was to him."

In 2026, the character was placed in an issue-led storyline, which saw Amy get groomed by DC Craig Ingram (Matthew James-Bailey).

== Ahmet ==
Ahmet
- EastEnders character
- Portrayed by: Tamer Hassan
- First appearance: Episode 3694; 5 December 2008
- Last appearance: Episode 3699; 15 December 2008
- Introduced by: Diederick Santer

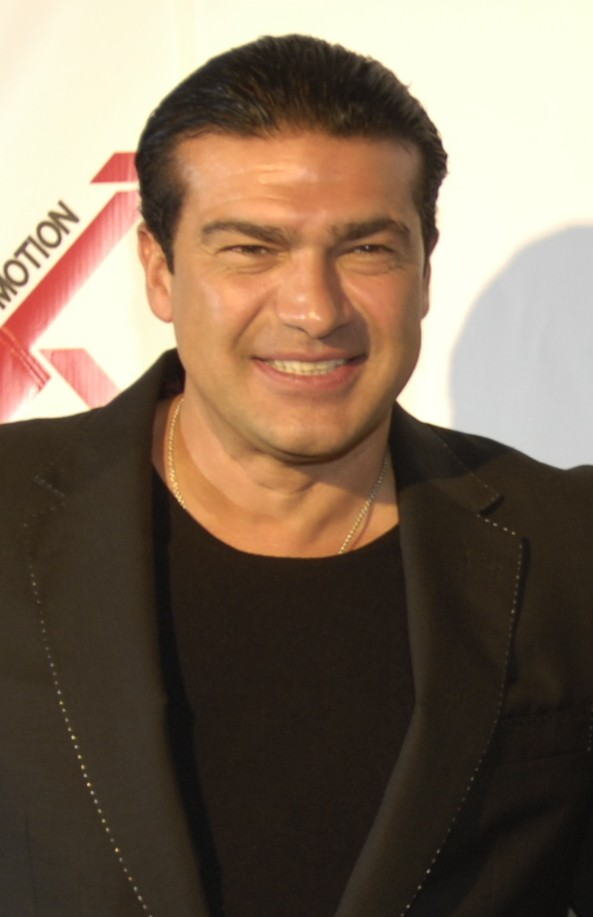
Tamer Hassan guest starred as Ahmet.

Ahmet played by Tamer Hassan, is an ex-boyfriend of Suzy Branning (Maggie O'Neill). He makes his first appearance on 5 December 2008. He made his last appearance on 15 December 2008. He was described by the South Wales Evening Post as the 'evil ex of Suzy'.

Suzy's dog, Prince, went missing but after she received a "special postcard" she immediately knew who had taken him. She met up with Ahmet in a café where it was revealed that the gold bar Suzy had originally had belonged to him and she stole it. On 15 December 2008, he returned, leaving a heart in a box on Suzy's doorstep. He later threatened her, demanding that she give him the gold bar by the end of the day. Phil Mitchell (Steve McFadden) arranged to meet with him to make him back off, he handed him a wad of cash and in return, Ahmet gave Prince back. He later met up with Suzy in the park and revealed that Suzy had previously lied about a pregnancy with him. He gave her until Christmas to get the money she owed him.

== Louise Hills ==
Louise Hills
- EastEnders character
- Portrayed by: Adie Allen
- Duration: 2008–2009
- First appearance: Episode 3697; 11 December 2008
- Last appearance: Episode 3912; 17 December 2009
- Introduced by: Diederick Santer
In-universe information
- Occupation: Sergeant

Detective Sergeant Louise Hills played by Adie Allen, is a sergeant who investigated the child sexual abuse involving Tony King (Chris Coghill) and Whitney Dean (Shona McGarty). She initially appeared on 11 and 12 December 2008, and then appeared for three more episodes, on 5 February 30 November and 17 December 2009.

She first appeared when she visited Bianca Jackson (Patsy Palmer) on 11 December 2008 to interview her and Whitney. Whilst there, Lauren Branning (Madeline Duggan) also came forward and told her the story of how Tony treated her. The next day, she returned to Pat Evans' (Pam St Clement) house to let Bianca know that Tony had been released on police bail because Whitney hadn't given her statement. Whitney later gave her statement to the police and Tony was later charged. She returned to tell Whitney and Bianca that Tony had pleaded "Not Guilty" to the charges and she later informs them that Tony attempted suicide while in custody. She returned to tell Whitney that a verdict is expected on whether Tony will be sentenced.

== Maria de Costa ==
Maria de Costa
- EastEnders character
- Portrayed by: Judy Browne
- Duration: 2008–2010, 2012
- First appearance: Episode 3697; 11 December 2008
- Last appearance: Episode 4406; 9 April 2012
- Introduced by: Diederick Santer (2008); Bryan Kirkwood (2010, 2012)
In-universe information
- Other names: Maria Leys
- Occupation: Social worker

Maria de Costa (also Leys) played by Judy Browne, is a social worker. She makes her first appearance on 11 December 2008 and returns on 20 January 2009. She reappears on 13 September and then on 30 September and then once again on 23 November. She then left on 6 December 2010. She returned on 22 March 2012.

She first appears when she visits Whitney Dean (Shona McGarty) following her abuse by Tony King (Chris Coghill). She later informs Tanya Branning (Jo Joyner) that her daughter Lauren Branning (Madeline Duggan) wanted to remain in care. She visits Stacey Branning (Lacey Turner) and her baby Lily Branning, and notes that Stacey appears agitated. She visits Stacey again after Janine Malloy (Charlie Brooks) reports Stacey for neglecting Lily. However, Maria concludes that Lily is not being neglected. She returns and comes to see Stacey for a home visit, not knowing that Stacey has gone missing with Lily. She visits again where Ryan Malloy (Neil McDermott) pretends to be Stacey's partner. Maria is so impressed that she says she will not need to visit Stacey again. Maria returns in March 2012 to take custody of George Trott after the death of his mother, Heather (Cheryl Fergison). She later returns George to Shirley Carter (Linda Henry), who is George's godmother, while Social Services try to locate George's father, Darren Miller (Charlie G. Hawkins). A week later she returns to collect George to reunite him with Darren.

== Paul ==
Paul
- EastEnders character
- Portrayed by: Jack Gordon
- Duration: 2008–2009
- First appearance: Episode 3704; 23 December 2008
- Last appearance: Episode 3750; 9 March 2009
- Introduced by: Diederick Santer
In-universe information
- Occupation: Barman

Paul, played by Jack Gordon, is a barman who Ronnie Mitchell (Samantha Womack) employed to help run R&R for a Christmas Party. He made various appearances, between December 2008, and his last being on 9 March 2009.

He appears first when he gets Danielle Jones (Lauren Crace) drunk and they sleep together. He reappeared taking her out on a date. Then he returned when Danielle discovered she was pregnant and met Paul to tell him but backed out when he told her that he already had a girlfriend. Paul re-appeared at an '80s theme night at R&R. He bumped into Danielle and her friend Stacey Slater (Lacey Turner), and offered to buy them a drink. Stacey later revealed to Paul that Danielle had aborted his baby. This made him feel guilty and realised that he should have supported her. Later he had a heart to heart with Stacey and told her about how he felt. However this led to them kissing, while a heartbroken Danielle looked on.

He then later appears when Stacey and Danielle are in the club with some boys Paul knows. Danielle spills her drink on one of the boys and Paul appears offering to buy her another one. At first she refuses but then after Stacey butts in, she accepts his offer. When Stacey goes outside to take a call from her mother, Paul talks to Danielle and apologises for the way he has behaved. He walks her to the bar and confronts her about her abortion. He thanks her because he believes he is too young to be a father. Danielle realises Stacey has told him and throws her drink at Paul and Danielle walks out before disowning Stacey.

== Dotty Cotton ==
Kirsty "Dotty" Cotton is played by Molly Conlin. She was introduced on 26 December 2008 as the daughter of established character Nick Cotton (John Altman). Dotty was used as Nick's partner in crime, as the duo planned to kill her grandmother Dot (June Brown) and inherit the money from her will. She and Dot subsequently became friends after the Nick's failed murder attempt, due to Dotty sabotaging their murder plan at last minute. In her final storyline, airing on 23 February 2010, she left with her mother Sandy (Caroline Pegg), whom she had believed to be dead.

Critics disliked Dotty, with her accent being criticised by Jane Simon from The Daily Mirror and critics from The Guardian and The Daily Mirror glad to see her leave. However, executive producer, Diederick Santer praised Conlin for her portrayal of Dotty and both Brown and Altman opined that the storyline was one of their highlights.

== Others ==
Character	Date(s)	Actor	Circumstances
DS Wrag	2 – 3 January (2 episodes)	Tim Faraday	A police officer investigating Kevin Wicks' (Phil Daniels) death.
Alex	3 January	Philip Honeywell	A man Preeti Choraria (Babita Pohoomull) meets as she is leaving Walford.
Rich	7 January	David Bauckham	A friend of Vinnie Monks (Bobby Davro), who lends Vinnie his car and house.
Jo	8 January	Louise Fitzgerald	A woman on a hen night at R&R.
Simon	14 January	Danny Dalton	A man who spikes Dawn Swann's (Kara Tointon) drink in R&R.
Ziggy	17 January	Ashley Horne	A member of Tegs Teague's (Ben Smith) gang.
Donna	24 January	Melanie Cameron	A Victoria Beckham-lookalike and Minty Peterson (Cliff Parisi) and Hazel Hobbs's (Kika Mirylees) rival in the wedding competition.
Ray Walters	25 January	Richard Hollis	A man who books R&R for a private function and meets with the owners, Jack Branning (Scott Maslen) and Ronnie Mitchell (Samantha Womack). Neither of them have read an e-mail from him explaining what he has booked the club for. He reveals that he is a naturist and that he wants to hold a naked party in the club. Ronnie and Jack joke that they and the staff could join in.
Jeph	4 – 5 February (2 episodes)	Justin Marosa	A traffic warden who Christian Clarke (John Partridge) chats up, and has sex with, enraging Ian Beale (Adam Woodyatt).
Marni Merrick	5 February – 25 April (8 episodes)	Lisa Ellis	A journalist from To Love and to Cherish magazine. She visits Minty Peterson (Cliff Parisi) for a photoshoot for the wedding competition he has entered with his former fiancée, Hazel Hobbs (Kika Mirylees). Heather Trott (Cheryl Fergison) pretends to be Hazel when Marni arrives.
Cheryl	7 February	Lucy Brooks	An escort hired by Deano Wicks (Matt Di Angelo). Deano makes his mother Shirley Carter (Linda Henry) pay for her services as he has just been released from prison.
Dr Therara	11 February	Paul Courtenay Hyu	A doctor who tends to Stacey Branning (Lacey Turner), when she ends up in hospital after taking liquid ecstasy.
Harriet Burgess	12 February – 21 March (4 episodes)	Lucy Robinson	Tanya Branning's (Jo Joyner) divorce solicitor, who introduces herself to Tanya's husband Max Branning (Jake Wood). She represents Tanya in the divorce hearing, although her assistant is bribed by Max to "lose" the incriminating DVD of him kissing Stacey Branning (Lacey Turner) and she has to change Tanya's reason for divorcing Max from "adultery" to "inappropriate behaviour". Tanya loses her temper in court, and later gets drunk and phones Harriet. Harriet also appears when Tanya wants to get an injunction against Max after she suspects he spiked her drink. Harriet advises Tanya to smooth things over with Max or risk losing her children. She then appears so Tanya and Max can cancel their divorce proceedings.
Lorraine	14 February	Lisa McDonald	Bradley Branning's (Charlie Clements) flatmates, who argue with each other about civil partnerships.
Gilly	14 February	Sarah Counsell	Bradley Branning's (Charlie Clements) flatmates, who argue with each other about civil partnerships.
Moira	14 February	Uncredited	Harriet Burgess's (Lucy Robinson) assistant, who is bribed by Max Branning (Jake Wood) to "lose" the incriminating DVD showing him kissing Stacey Branning (Lacey Turner).
DC Hargreaves	19 February 2008, 23 March 2010 (2 episodes)	Danny Nutt	A police officer who investigates a break-in at Jack Branning's (Scott Maslen) flat in 2008. In 2010 he informs Jean Slater (Gillian Wright) that a body has been found matching her daughter Stacey Branning's (Lacey Turner) description.
Bungle	21 February	Sam Ardley	Darren Miller's (Charlie G. Hawkins) friend, who attends Tanya Branning's (Jo Joyner) birthday party.
Paula	25 February	Ellena Stacey	A homeless girl who befriends Steven Beale (Aaron Sidwell), only to steal his wallet.
Tina Teague	25 – 28 February (2 episodes)	Kerry Ann White	The mother of Tegs Teague (Ben Smith) who stabbed Jay Brown (Jamie Borthwick). Tina appears in an attempt to bully Jay into not testifying against her son in court. She later appears when she knocks on the door of the Millers and Dawn Swann (Kara Tointon) opens it. Tina threatens her saying that Jay should not go to court. When Tina purposely breaks Dawn's daughter Summer Swann's toy, Dawn snaps and throws her out and sets her dog Genghis on her. Tina's bullying tactics fail and Tegs is sentenced to two years in a Young Offenders Institution.
Simon Ackroyd	29 February 2008, 3 March 2008, 5 June 2009; 24 July 2014; 16 December 2016 (5 episodes)	Alex Avery	Abi Branning (Lorna Fitzgerald) and Ben Mitchell's (Charlie Jones) teacher, who appears when Max Branning (Jake Wood) and Tanya Branning (Jo Joyner) and Phil Mitchell (Steve McFadden) and Shirley Carter (Linda Henry) attended a parents' evening at Walford High School. In June 2009, he informs Bianca Jackson (Patsy Palmer) that her adoptive daughter Whitney Dean (Shona McGarty) did not attend any of her GCSE exams. Bianca is outraged with the way he delivers this and ejects him from her house. In July 2014, Bianca's daughter Tiffany Butcher (Maisie Smith) inadvertently brings drugs into school, cooked into brownies obtained from the local café, so Mr Ackroyd calls Bianca and her mother Carol Jackson (Lindsey Coulson) in. Bianca denies cooking the brownies, but she is drunk and he tells her that he must inform Social Services. In December 2016, Mr Ackroyd attends his school's Nativity play at the local church, which he narrates.
Matthew	3 – 4 March (2 episodes)	James Hoogland	A boy who Lucy Beale (Melissa Suffield) meets in the café. Lucy's father Ian Beale (Adam Woodyatt) later throws him out of his house as he is there alone with Lucy.
Alex French	6 March	Pippa Hinchley	The head of a construction site on George Street, who Bradley Branning (Charlie Clements) approaches to ask for a job. They get off to a bad start, with Bradley initially assuming that Alex is male due to her unisex name. She offers him labouring work, though he tells her that he is looking for work as a salesman. He is later offered a job selling the flats.
Julia Ellison	6 March	Sally Giles	A woman who interviews Stacey Branning (Lacey Turner) for a place on a BTech course in fashion design. Although Julia cannot offer Stacey a place at Walford college, as the course is oversubscribed, she offers a place at a college in Croydon. Stacey declines as she does not want to leave Walford.
Dr Khan	10 March	Meneka Das	A doctor who tends to Shirley Carter (Linda Henry) when she fell and hit her head. Shirley confided in her about a lump she had found on her breast.
DC Bedows	20 March	Jane Cameron	A police officer investigating the disappearance of Lucy Beale (Melissa Suffield).
Simon	28 March – 18 April (2 episodes)	Richard Heap	A private investigator hired by Christian Clarke (John Partridge) to find Lucy Beale (Melissa Suffield).
Saul	31 March	James Doherty	A gay couple who are getting married in the hotel where Pat Evans (Pam St. Clement) and Peggy Mitchell (Barbara Windsor) are staying. Nathan has second thoughts and calls off the civil partnership ceremony, but after talking to Pat, marries Saul.
Nathan	31 March	Mark Rice-Oxley	A gay couple who are getting married in the hotel where Pat Evans (Pam St. Clement) and Peggy Mitchell (Barbara Windsor) are staying. Nathan has second thoughts and calls off the civil partnership ceremony, but after talking to Pat, marries Saul.
Harry	1 April – 23 July 2012	Danny Brown	The owner of the B&B where Bianca Jackson (Patsy Palmer) and her children are staying, who throws them out onto the streets.
Charmaine	3 April	Claire Louise Cordwell	Bianca Jackson's (Patsy Palmer) friend who refuses to let her and her children sleep at her house as having them stay there could affect her benefits.
Toto	3 April	Anthony Warren	A man who lives in Lucas Johnson's (Don Gilet) old house and gives his daughter Chelsea Fox (Tiana Benjamin) an address where to find him.
Anna	3 April	Laurietta Essien	A welfare officer who Bianca Jackson (Patsy Palmer) has a meeting with after she is made homeless. She tells Bianca that as she made herself intentionally homeless, they will be unable to help her. She says she will contact social services about her children, so Bianca leaves.
Gerome	3 April	Dominic Debias	A member of Lucas Johnson's (Don Gilet) congregation. Chelsea Fox (Tiana Benjamin) asks him if he knows who Lucas Johnson is so he tells her he is the preacher.
PC Adams	4 April – 5 May 2008 26–28 December 2009 (4 episodes, EastEnders); 7–30 September 2010 (2 episodes, EastEnders: E20)	Andrew Watson	A police officer who sees a homeless Bianca Jackson (Patsy Palmer) with her children at a bus stop, having slept there. Bianca insists that they just missed the last bus to Margate the night before. Later, Adams sees the family without Bianca; Whitney Dean calls Bianca, who rushes back and tells Adams that they have somewhere to go and to leave them alone. Adams says he will check with Social Services, and as he goes to grab Bianca, she hits him, so he arrests her for assault. He later attends the scene when Pat Evans (Pam St. Clement) is run over by Roxy Mitchell's (Rita Simons) car. In 2009 he appears following the murder of Archie Mitchell (Larry Lamb), questioning Phil Mitchell (Steve McFadden) and Peggy Mitchell (Barbara Windsor) and a drunk Phil is aggressive towards him. He later appears in the EastEnders spin-off EastEnders: E20, when he speaks to Sol Levi (Tosin Cole) and Billy Mitchell (Perry Fenwick) in episode 1 after Billy calls the police about his stock being knocked over. In episode 8 he and his colleague chase after Asher Levi (Heshima Thompson) when Jane Beale (Laurie Brett) tells them he is a thief, and they later stop Sol asking if he knows where his brother Asher is.
Sarah	4 April	Michelle Abrahams	Frank Butcher's (Mike Reid) solicitor, who reads out his will and carries out his instructions. She explains that as Frank owed a lot of tax, there is no money in his estate.
Michael	4 April	Cymon Allen	A man who assumes Bianca Jackson (Patsy Palmer) is a sex worker. Desperate for money, she goes along with it but tries to steal his money. He punches her in the face and drives away, leaving her at an industrial site.
Keisha	7 April–1 May (5 episodes)	Suzie McGrath	Winston's (Ulric Browne) niece who comes to help him on the market. She bumps into Gus Smith (Mohammed George) and later they start dating. She uses his poetry as lyrics for her songs and when she sings at an open mic night at the Vic, Gus's aunt Opal assumes they are in a relationship. Sean Slater (Robert Kazinsky) later tells her that Gus is a womaniser and misogynist and has sex with her himself, allowing Gus to find them. Gus later leaves Walford to become a roadie on her tour.
Alice Grayling	8–14 April (4 episodes)	Susannah Wise	A social worker who Bianca Jackson (Patsy Palmer) visits, trying to get some emergency accommodation after her children are taken into care because they are homeless. She tells Bianca it will be difficult to place her, and asks her to wait until the next morning, but Bianca rages at her about being a single mother, and then tells her she has found a place to stay—31 Albert Square (Pat Evans' (Pam St. Clement) house). Bianca then pretends to be back together with her son Liam Butcher's (James Forde) and daughter Tiffany Butcher's (Maisie Smith) father Ricky Butcher (Sid Owen), so Alice will think that there are three adults to look after her children. Alice is about to go to inspect Pat's house, but is called away to deal with another case. When Alice inspects Pat's house, she approves that the children can live there.
Alan Daniels	17–21 April; 31 July 2015 (4 episodes)	Garry Roost	A journalist from the Walford Gazette, who organises a 'Barmaid of the Year' competition. Roxy Mitchell (Rita Simons) and Dawn Swann (Kara Tointon) compete in the competition, and although Dawn rightfully wins, Roxy's lover Sean Slater (Robert Kazinsky) threatens Alan, telling him to make Roxy the winner. Roxy later asks Alan about her victory, and he reveals that Sean had threatened him. He appears again, interviewing Les (Roger Sloman) and Pam Coker (Lin Blakley) about the centenary of their undertakers' business, Coker and Sons.
Wendy Hewson	17 April 2008, 7 July 2015 (2 episodes)	Elizabeth Nestor	Two friends of Jean Slater (Gillian Wright) who along with Jean, interrupted Jean's daughter Stacey Branning (Lacey Turner) and her boyfriend Steven Beale (Aaron Sidwell) when they were trying to have a romantic evening. Jean could not remember Wendy Hewson's first name, despite being able to remember Wendy Simmons' first name. They later attend Jean's wedding to Ollie Walters (Tony O'Callaghan).
Wendy Simmons	17 April 2008, 7 July 2015 (2 episodes)	Karren Winchester	Two friends of Jean Slater (Gillian Wright) who along with Jean, interrupted Jean's daughter Stacey Branning (Lacey Turner) and her boyfriend Steven Beale (Aaron Sidwell) when they were trying to have a romantic evening. Jean could not remember Wendy Hewson's first name, despite being able to remember Wendy Simmons' first name. They later attend Jean's wedding to Ollie Walters (Tony O'Callaghan).
Christine	25 April	Uncredited	A photographer at Heather Trott and Minty Peterson's wedding who smiles and waves at Garry Hobbs. Garry arranges to take her back to his flat but when Shirley Carter sees them, she jokes that Garry and Christine was loud the night before. Christine believes that Garry had sex with another woman so she leaves and Garry tries to tell her it was a joke and accidentally calls her by the wrong name.
Lucy	29 April	Alice Henley	A homeless girl thought to be Lucy Beale (Melissa Suffield).
Richard	5 May	Jeremy Clyde	A man who Peggy Mitchell (Barbara Windsor) takes a fancy to at her grandson Ben's (Charlie Jones) dancing exam.
Dr Watt	6 May	Caroline Corrie	A doctor who tends to Pat Evans (Pam St. Clement) when she is run over.
Arnold	6–9 May (3 episodes)	Richard Lumsden	Clare Bates' (Gemma Bissix) former boyfriend. Clare steals jewellery from his wife.
Gabrielle Proctor	12 May	Devon Black	Liam Butcher's (James Forde) teacher, who calls a meeting with Liam's parents Ricky Butcher (Sid Owen) and Bianca Jackson (Patsy Palmer) to discuss Liam's truancy and bad academic results. Ricky shouts at her, accusing her of calling his son stupid, and he and Bianca leave the meeting.
Laura	12 May	Jessica Regan	Jamie Stewart's (Edward MacLiam) former wife, who drops off their son Felix Stewart (Oaklee Pendergast) while Jamie is on a date at The Queen Victoria with Roxy Mitchell (Rita Simons).
Felix Stewart	12 May	Oaklee Pendergast	Jamie Stewart's (Edward MacLiam) son, who appears when his mother Laura Stewart (Jessica Regan) drops him off with Jamie while he is on a date with Roxy Mitchell (Rita Simons). Felix gets on well with Roxy, and falls asleep on her bed.
Gail	15 May	Elizabeth Knight	A poledancing instructor who Jack Branning (Scott Maslen) books to give a class in R&R.
Sergeant Vicky Buchanan	16 May 2008, 31 May 2016 (2 episodes)	Nicola Sanderson	A custody sergeant at Walford Police Station when Shirley Carter (Linda Henry) and Heather Peterson (Cheryl Fergison) are arrested for being drunk and disorderly. Buchanan puts them in a cell together due to overcrowding, but turns the cell alarm off due to Shirley using it to call her constantly. When Heather suffers an asthma attack, Shirley has to bang on the door to attract Buchanan's attention. Buchanan gives Heather her medication, and listens to Heather and Shirley's woes about Minty Peterson (Cliff Parisi), Phil Mitchell (Steve McFadden) and Vinnie Monks (Bobby Davro). Eight years later, she interviews Bobby Beale (Eliot Carrington) before he is charged with the unlawful killing of his half-sister Lucy Beale (Hetti Bywater).
Glynis	20–22 May (2 episodes)	Sheryl Gannaway	A flight attendant who Garry Hobbs (Ricky Groves) meets on his flight from Benidorm. She visits Garry in Walford, but leaves when Heather Peterson (Cheryl Fergison) walks in on her husband, Minty Peterson (Cliff Parisi), kissing Glynis's friend, Melanie.
Melanie	20–22 May (2 episodes)	Rachel Mitchem	Glynis's friend, who visits Garry Hobbs (Ricky Groves) with her. She kisses Minty Peterson (Cliff Parisi), but leaves in disgust when Heather Peterson (Cheryl Fergison) walks in and reveals that she is Minty's wife.
Kyle	27 May	Simon Bubb	A man who buys cocaine returned to Sean Slater (Robert Kazinsky) by Chelsea Fox (Tiana Benjamin), only to find that Chelsea has replaced it with sugar.
Anton	29–30 May (2 episodes)	Chris Geere	One of Bradley Branning's (Charlie Clements) colleagues.
Piers	29 May – 6 June (5 episodes)	Simon Delaney	One of Bradley Branning's (Charlie Clements) colleagues, who gives Chelsea Fox (Tiana Benjamin) cocaine. He is later punched by her father, Lucas Johnson (Don Gilet).
Leigh	29 May	Nikia Mitchell	Two girls from Whitney Dean's (Shona McGarty) school, who try to mug her.
Kerry	29 May	Gemma Boyle	Two girls from Whitney Dean's (Shona McGarty) school, who try to mug her.
Sandra Fielding	6 June 2008, 24 March 2009, 25 September 2009 (3 episodes)	Kiruna Stamell	An employee at Walford Primary School. In her first appearance, she tests Liam Butcher (James Forde) for dyslexia and lets Liam's father, Ricky Butcher (Sid Owen) take the test, as Liam is nervous. She concludes that there is a strong possibility that Liam has dyslexia, but Ricky is just not intelligent. In her next appearance, Ricky and his wife Bianca Jackson (Patsy Palmer) meet her at another parents evening, and in her third, she visits Ricky and Bianca at home to discuss Liam's education. She is EastEnders' first character with dwarfism.
Ted	11 June – 28 July (5 episodes)	Richard Hope	A man who meets Jean Slater (Gillian Wright) at The Queen Victoria's singles' night. He ends their relationship, saying he cannot cope with Jean's constant phonecalls.
Samantha	11 June	Uncredited	A woman who flirts with Minty Peterson (Cliff Parisi) at The Queen Victoria's singles' night, and is later seen kissing him in the market.
Helen	23–24 June	Uncredited	Two guests at Abi Branning's (Lorna Fitzgerald) birthday party.
Rachel	23–24 June	Uncredited	Two guests at Abi Branning's (Lorna Fitzgerald) birthday party.
Bernard	24 June	David Bamber	The maître d' at a newly refurbished Fargo's restaurant, who has to deal with bipolar Jean Slater (Gillian Wright) being stood up, and Bianca Jackson (Patsy Palmer) not being able to pay for her family's meal on his first day.
Miranda	24 June	Uncredited	A waitress at Fargo's.
Dean	8 July	Henry Garrett	Archie Mitchell's (Larry Lamb) gardener, who his daughter, Roxy Mitchell (Rita Simons) has sex with.
Dave	8 July	Jeff Bennett	A man who approaches Ronnie Mitchell (Samantha Womack) in a café and gives her his phone number. Ronnie's car is stolen, so she flirts with Dave to get a lift.
Timmy Tropics	14 July	Uncredited	A dodgy associate of Mo Harris (Laila Morse), who sells Billy Mitchell (Perry Fenwick) bananas for his fruit and veg stall. One of the boxes of bananas contains a tarantula, which bites Charlie Slater (Derek Martin).
Chinese Walter	17 July	Peter Law	A dodgy associate of Mo Harris (Laila Morse), who sells her some stolen meat. In May 2009, Mo reveals he is in prison.
Miss Levy	28 July	Emmanuella Cole	Billy (Perry Fenwick) and Honey Mitchell's (Emma Barton) bank manager, who gives them a loan.
Helen Hughes	31 July–1 August 2008; 18 February 2010 (3 episodes)	Joyce Henderson	A registrar who marries Sean Slater (Robert Kazinsky) and Roxy Mitchell (Rita Simons). She has another wedding booked, so is exasperated when Sean turns up late, and is further outraged when he and Bradley Branning (Charlie Clements) swap clothes at the altar, and Roxy and Sean will not stop kissing. Roxy's sister Ronnie Mitchell (Samantha Womack) then storms in and tears up the marriage certificate, causing further problems. In 2010, she marries Bradley and Stacey Slater (Lacey Turner).
Chloe	1 August	Uncredited	A girl at Lucas Johnson's (Don Gilet) talent show who performs a ballet routine.
Josh	1 August	Uncredited	A boy at Lucas Johnson's (Don Gilet) talent show who performs a martial arts routine to the song "Kung Fu Fighting".
Shannon Jacobs	14–18 August (2 episodes)	Claire Redcliffe	An environmental health inspector. She arrives to inspect the Masoods' kitchen as they have started their takeaway business from home. When she arrives, Tamwar Masood (Himesh Patel) is dissecting a bull's eye on the kitchen table, and shows it to her as he thinks she is a reporter from the Walford Gazette. She later returns and carries out a full inspection, telling Zainab Masood (Nina Wadia) that she will be shutting down the business until regulations are met.
Douglas hars	15 August	Michael Bertenshaw	The vet who euthanises Wellard (Kyte).
Waseem	21 August 2008–2012	Richard Charles	A friend of Tamwar Masood (Himesh Patel), who works on the Masood family's market stall, Masala Masood, and later Masala Queen restaurant. He is seen working in the background of scenes, and on his own when the Masoods are elsewhere.
Camilla Greenwood	21 August	Joanna Van Gyseghem	The mother of Lucy Beale's (Melissa Suffield) boyfriend Olly Greenwood (Bart Edwards). She attends a meal at the Beales' house, and Lucy's father Ian Beale (Adam Woodyatt) tries to affiliate himself with her as she is rich. She disapproves of Olly and Lucy's relationship as she wants Olly to focus on his studies, and therefore storms out of the house.
Cynthia Marshall	25–29 August (2 episodes)	Alexandra Bastedo	A rich lady whose vintage car breaks down in Walford, and Garry Hobbs (Ricky Groves) and Minty Peterson (Cliff Parisi) flirt with her while they take it to the garage where they work to fix it. Although she has a fancy car and house, she does not have £200 to pay to Garry and Minty, so she gives them, along with their flatmate Vinnie Monks (Bobby Davro), her boat Phillippa instead.
Lindsey	26 August	Sama Goldie	A barmaid at R&R, who is behind the private bar at Dawn Swann's (Kara Tointon) hen night, which nobody attends.
Campbell	26 August	Frank Scantori	The landlord of the pub Terry Bates (Nicholas Ball) and his gang frequent, who Jase Dyer (Stephen Lord) intimidates while trying to track them down. Campbell says he knows nothing and has not seen Terry for weeks.
Rennie	26–28 August (2 episodes)	Nick Nevern	Terry Bates's (Nicholas Ball) henchman, who help Terry beat up Jase Dyer (Stephen Lord). Terry tells Rennie to finish Jase off but Rennie says that would make him the murderer and refuses.
Marco	26–28 August (2 episodes)	Uncredited	Terry Bates's (Nicholas Ball) henchman, who help Terry beat up Jase Dyer (Stephen Lord). Terry tells Rennie to finish Jase off but Rennie says that would make him the murderer and refuses.
PC Jessop	26 August	Ray De-Haan	A police officer who pulls Jase Dyer (Stephen Lord) over for speeding, only to be attacked by Jase, who then drives away.
DC Roberts	29 August	Uncredited	A police colleague of DI Kelly (Ian Burfield). They visit Billy Mitchell (Perry Fenwick) after Jase Dyer (Stephen Lord) is murdered.
Steve	29 August	Uncredited	A social worker who Jay Brown (Jamie Borthwick) speaks to, telling Dawn Swann (Kara Tointon) that he called Social Services to take him into care.
Fiona	8 September	Emma Jerrold	A redhead who Ricky Butcher (Sid Owen) picks up in his taxi and ends up taking out for a date. He tells her that he is still in love with his former wife Bianca Jackson (Patsy Palmer), and she understands although she really likes him.
Dillon	19 September	Dyfed Potter	Two Welsh men who meets Stacey Branning (Lacey Turner) and Danielle Jones (Lauren Crace) in Walford park and buy them ice cream. They later bump into each other in R&R.
Gareth	19 September	Nick Richards	Two Welsh men who meets Stacey Branning (Lacey Turner) and Danielle Jones (Lauren Crace) in Walford park and buy them ice cream. They later bump into each other in R&R.
Alistair Childs	26 September	Peter Bramhill	The regional manager of the Minute Mart franchise, who comes to inspect the Bridge Street, Walford branch and its franchisees Patrick Trueman (Rudolph Walker) and Yolande Trueman (Angela Wynter), after Patrick sells an unchilled prawn sandwich to Dot Branning (June Brown) which gives her food poisoning. He finds the shop in good order, despite assistant Heather's comments about Yolande trying to bribe Dot into keeping quiet. He later offers Yolande a job in the head office in Birmingham.
Kwame	26 September	Tyronne Lewis	A man who Suzy Branning (Maggie O'Neill) sets up on a date with Denise Wicks (Diane Parish). Kwame bores Denise and her former boyfriend Lucas Johnson (Don Gilet) has to help her get away from the date.
Carrie Dunlop	7–9 October (2 episodes)	Nicola Wainwight	A woman who works at the care home in which Jay Brown (Jamie Borthwick) is staying following the death of his father, Jase Dyer (Stephen Lord). She escorts Jay to his father's funeral, and later appears when Billy Mitchell (Perry Fenwick) visits Jay.
Karen	2 October	Georgina Lamb	Ronnie Mitchell's (Samantha Womack) old school friend who she meets at a school reunion.
"Jo Hill"	16–17 October (2 episodes)	Uncredited	A performer in a comedy show that Jane Beale (Laurie Brett) and Tamwar Masood (Himesh Patel) appear in, who is announced as "the secret lovechild of Jo Brand and Harry Hill."
Adam Smith	16–17 October (2 episodes)	David Keeling	The compere and organiser of the stand-up show that Jane Beale (Laurie Brett) and Tamwar Masood (Himesh Patel) appear in. He flirts with Jane and asks her out for a meal.
DS Collins	28 October	Cornelius Macarthy	A police officer investigating Max Branning's (Jake Wood) allegations of attempted murder against his brother Jack (Scott Maslen).
Dr Lawler	31 October	Claudia Elmhirst	A doctor treating Max Branning (Jake Wood) after he is run over by a car.
Will Holden	4 November– 19 December (2 episodes)	Ross Waiton	One of the many journalists around the Square after Max Branning (Jake Wood) is run over. He hears Bianca Jackson (Patsy Palmer) talking about the incident in Bridge Street café and speaks to her about it. When she reveals that Max is her uncle, Holden gives her his business card. Bianca later asks Max's wife Tanya Branning (Jo Joyner) some questions about Max, but when she realises the distress it is causing Tanya, she walks away and rips up the card. He made a report a month later at Christmas.
George Poulton	4 November	Uncredited	The first comedian to perform at The Vic's comedy night, before Jane Beale (Laurie Brett).
Jackie	10 November	Shelley Minto	The forewoman on a building site on Turpin Road. She hires Sean Slater (Robert Kazinsky) as a casual worker, paying him a pittance, and flirts with Masood Ahmed (Nitin Ganatra), taking her builders to his stall for lunch to help his profits.
Mal	10 November	Alexander Kirk	A comedy agent who visits Ian Beale (Adam Woodyatt) and Jane Beale (Laurie Brett), interested in Jane's stand-up act. His chauvanism angers Ian, who throws him out.
Natalie Jennings	17 – 18 November (2 episodes)	Polly Frame	The midwife who delivers Amy Mitchell.
Dr Mackie	17 November	Mark Gillis	One of the doctors who delivers Amy Mitchell.
Nina	21 November – 1 December (2 episodes)	Belinda Everett	Tanya Branning's (Jo Joyner) cellmate.
Sarah	18 December	Miranda Pleasence	The daughter of Janine Butcher's (Charlie Brooks) husband, David. After his death, Sarah throws Janine out, making her homeless.
David	18–19 December (2 episodes)	Harry Towb	Janine Butcher's (Charlie Brooks) rich, Jewish husband, who dies of a heart attack when Janine is exposed as a fraud moments after they marry.
"Scally"	19 December	Alan Williams	A tramp who Dot Branning (June Brown) gives spare clothes and money to so that he can clean himself up.
