= Paul Bhattacharjee =

English actor

- Bhattacharjee in Casino Royale
- Born: Gautam Paul Bhattacharjee; 4 May 1960; Harrow, Middlesex, England
- Disappeared: 10 July 2013; London, England
- Died: c. 10 July 2013 (aged 53); Seaford, East Sussex, England
- Body discovered: 12 July 2013
- Occupation: Actor
- Years active: 1979–2013
- Height: 6 ft 0 in (1.83 m)

Gautam Paul Bhattacharjee (4 May 1960 – c. 10 July 2013) was a British actor who worked on stage, film and television.

== Early life and career ==
The son of Gautam Bhattacharjee, a member of the Indian Communist Party who had to flee from the country in 1942, and Anne, a woman from a family of Russian descent, he was educated at state schools in Harrow. In the 1970s, Paul was a member of "The Young Theatre" at North Harrow where he was very involved in their productions (including an early role in The Thwarting of Baron Bolligrew in 1974) and began to learn his trade as an actor. An association with Jatinder Verma and his theatre company Tara Arts began in 1979, when he was, according to Verma "passionately idealistic, both artistically and politically" and had the desire "to use theatre to change the world". Bhattacharjee appeared in Yes Memsahib (1979), "the story of the formation of modern East Africa by colonial Indian 'coolie' labour", and Diwali (1980), which he also directed, "the story behind the annual Festival of Lights", among other productions.

Bhattacharjee's first regular television role was in the short-lived soap Albion Market (1985) in which his character was charged by the police for the murder of a racist; it was the actor's work as a teenage anti-racism activist which had led to his first meeting with Jatinder Verma in 1977. He played Omar Khayyam, a narrator named after the poet, in Iranian Nights (1989) by Howard Brenton and Tariq Ali, at the Royal Court, a satirical response to the controversy over Salman Rushdie's novel The Satanic Verses, which was later shown in a television version on Channel 4.

He had successfully taken over Art Malik's role in the West End run (at the Aldwych Theatre) of Indian Ink by Tom Stoppard in 1995 after originally playing the character's son, and had appeared in Murmuring Judges (Royal National Theatre, 1991), one of the plays in David Hare's trilogy examining British institutions.

== After 2000 ==
At the time of the actor's early death, Michael Billington admitted to most "treasuring" Bhattacharjee's performance as Hari Hobson in a version of Hobson's Choice. The adaptation of the original Harold Brighouse play by Tanika Gupta, produced at the Young Vic theatre in 2003, transposed the characters to contemporary Salford's Asian business community. In his contemporary review, Billington observed that in the role he "captures both the blazered posturing and alcoholic pathos of the defeated Hobson".

He was cast as Inzamam Ahmed in EastEnders, recurring in the soap opera for two years from 2008, and appeared in the films Dirty Pretty Things (2002), Casino Royale (2006), and The Best Exotic Marigold Hotel (2012).

Bhattacharjee appeared during 2012 as Benedick in a Royal Shakespeare Company production of Much Ado About Nothing at the RSC's Courtyard Theatre in Stratford, with Meera Syal as Beatrice. Paul Cavendish, reviewing the production for The Daily Telegraph, thought Bhattacharjee delivered the best performance of the ensemble.

== Bankruptcy and death ==
HM Revenue and Customs had successfully petitioned for the actor to be declared insolvent; no other creditors are known. On 10 July 2013, a day after he had been declared bankrupt in the High Court of Justice, Bhattacharjee, aged 53, went missing, when the cast were towards the end of the rehearsal period for Talk Show, a black comedy by Alistair McDowall for the Royal Court. On 12 July, his body was found at the foot of Splash Point cliffs in Seaford, East Sussex, but was not conclusively identified until five days later. A post-mortem examination found that he died from multiple injuries. Police were not treating Bhattacharjee's death as suspicious. According to Michael Billington in July 2013, he "was one of those actors whose" credit in a theatre "programme gave you the reassuring sense that you were in safe hands" and "just one of those actors whom it was always a delight to see". In November 2013, Bhattacharjee's death was declared to be a suicide while he was severely depressed, by the coroner of East Sussex.

== Filmography ==
Year	Title	Role	Notes
1992	Wild West	Amir	
2000	Command Approved	Warlord	
2005	The Mistress of Spices	Mohammed	
2006	Casino Royale	Hot Room Doctor #1	
2010	National Theatre Live: A Disappearing Number	Aninda Rao	
2011	The Best Exotic Marigold Hotel	Dr. Ghujarapartidar	
2014	Honeycomb Lodge	Mini's Father	(final film role)
