= Joseph Nargba Cooper =

Liberian politician

Joseph Nargba Cooper (16 August 1918 – 22 May 1975) was a Liberian politician from Bong County who held office in the third quarter of the twentieth century. Born on 16 August 1918 in the town of Gbaudi in Zorzor District, Lofa County, he was the son of Porkpa Womma and Nowai Gbanasei. After receiving his early education in a Lutheran school at Zorzor, Cooper left in 1933 to follow his brother Charlie to Kakata, where he finished his education at a Catholic mission school. Having completed his schooling, Cooper entered the employ of the Firestone Plantation Company; here he worked until 1944, when the government hired him to become a chauffeur for President Tubman. Later in his government service, Cooper was the Native Advocate for the Central Province. In 1967, Cooper was elected to fill one of Bong County's seats in the House of Representatives; he continued to occupy this office until his death, which occurred in a Bong County hospital on 22 May 1975. From 29 January 1950 until his death, Cooper was married to the former Emma L. Jensen, a native of Sanoyie; they had four sons and four daughters. As an adult, Cooper was affiliated with the Lutheran church.
