= Joe Cooper (footballer, born 1918) =

English footballer

Personal information
- Full name: Joseph Cooper
- Date of birth: 16 February 1918
- Place of birth: Reddish, England
- Date of death: August 1992 (aged 74)
- Place of death: Reddish, England
- Position: Left back

Senior career*
Years	Team	Apps	(Gls)
1938	Blackpool	0	(0)
1939–1946	Crewe Alexandra	4	(0)
- * Club domestic league appearances and goals

Joseph Cooper (16 February 1918 – August 1992) was an English professional footballer. A left back who could also play at right back, he played in the Football League for Crewe Alexandra. He started his career on the books of Blackpool, but did not make any League appearances for the Seasiders.
