= Joe Cooper (presenter) =

British broadcaster and radio presenter

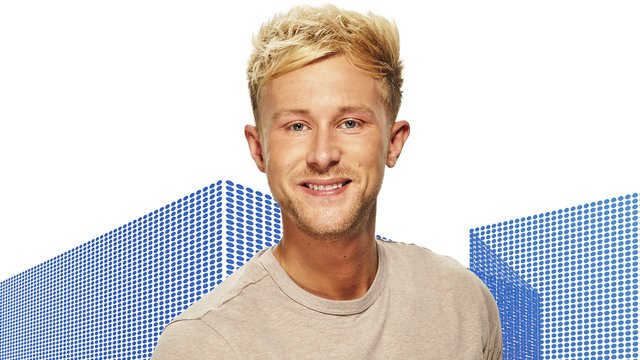

Joe Cooper is a broadcaster and radio presenter currently hosting the Breakfast show on Radio 1 UAE who trained at Sylvia Young Theatre School.

In May 2013, Cooper started presenting and voicing the character of Eubie in Higglytown Heroes for Playhouse Disney On 1 July 2,

At the end of 2017, Joe made his debut on The Hits hosting the evening show before moving on to breakfast at the start of 2018. In June 2018 he joined Global he joined Capital Yorkshire to host the weekend shows and covering drive-time. He has also appeared on Capital Liverpool (E) & Capital Manchester.
