= Zorzor =

City in Lofa County, Liberia

- Location in Liberia
- Coordinates: 7°47′N 9°26′W
- Country: Liberia
- County: Lofa County

Zorzor is the second largest city in Lofa County, Liberia. Located far from Liberia's capital of Monrovia, it is a local trade center for agricultural products such as rice, cassava, pineapples, palm oil, and palm kernels. Zorzor's major ethnic groups include the Kpelle and Loma peoples. The town also contains an American Lutheran church hospital, a leper colony, and a handicrafts workshop. The Zozor Rural Teacher Training institute is located in the nearby town of Fisebu. Without motorised transport, Zorzor is approximately seven days' walk away from Monrovia. The city's first hospital was the aforementioned Lutheran facility, which was constructed in 1924; local residents were initially suspicious of Western medicinal practices, but they were ultimately convinced by thirty-one years of labor by Esther Bacon, an American nurse who worked at the hospital from 1941 until her 1972 death.

Zorzor's population as of the latest census was 4,752.

The Lutheran hospital mentioned above catered to the health needs of the rural and local community. Mr.Augustine Aiyadurai from Schieffelin Institute of health - Research & Leprosy center, India was working as an administrator when he contracted a fatal illness and died on 3 August 2014.

== See also ==
- List of reduplicated place names
