= Episode 7246 =

- EastEnders episode
- Episode no.: Episode 7246
- Directed by: Richard Lynn
- Written by: Richard Davidson
- Original air date: 23 December 2025
- Running time: 29 minutes

Guest appearances
- Pam St Clement as Pat Evans; Shaun Williamson as Barry Evans; Nicola Duffett as Debbie Bates; Daniel Delaney as young Phil Mitchell; Teddy Jay as young Grant Mitchell

Episode chronology
| ← Previous "Episode 7245" | Next → "Episode 7247" |

"Episode 7246" of the British television soap opera EastEnders was broadcast in the United Kingdom on BBC One on 23 December 2025. The episode was directed by Richard Lynn and written by Richard Davidson. The plot focuses on Nigel Bates' (Paul Bradley) worsening dementia symptoms as his memories become confused with his reality and he believes he is in the 1990s encountering people from his past. The episode concludes with Nigel's wife, Julie Bates (Karen Henthorn), and best friend, Phil Mitchell (Steve McFadden), realising Nigel needs professional care.

When devising the soap's Christmas and New Year episodes, the show's story team decided to follow a "past, present, future" theme across a series of episodes. "Episode 7246" forms the theme of the past with former cast members Pam St Clement (Pat Evans), Shaun Williamson (Barry Evans) and Nicola Duffett (Debbie Bates) reprising their respective roles, having each been previously killed off in the soap. Ben Wadey, the show's executive producer, wanted the episode to celebrate Christmas while also portraying the reality of Nigel's story.

"Episode 7246" was filmed in October 2025 and primarily set in The Queen Victoria pub with scenes set in both the present day and the 1990s. Lynn wanted to use the set creatively to reflect what Nigel would be thinking as he deteriorates. The show's art department replicated many elements of the Vic for the 1990s scenes by either hiring, purchasing or creating items. Senior designer Jonathan Smith examined episodes from the 1990s to ensure consistency in the episode. The modern Queen Victoria bust differs from the one used in the 1990s, so the designers had to repurpose a spare bust by painting it grey to match the 1990s bust.

The episode received an overnight audience of 2.1 million viewers. It received a positive reception from television critics and viewers who praised its emotional script and enjoyed the returns of former characters. Yasmin Vince from the Daily Mirror called the episode "the show's most powerful episode ever". Erin Zammitt of Digital Spy commended the performances of Bradley, Henthorn and McFadden, but said the episode's "underrated highlight" was the appearance of Daniel Delaney and Teddy Jay as the younger versions of Phil and Grant Mitchell.

== Plot ==
Believing himself to be in the 1990s, Nigel Bates (Paul Bradley), who has dementia, finds Pat Evans (Pam St Clement) in The Queen Victoria pub. Her stepson, Barry Evans (Shaun Williamson), then sings "Lonely This Christmas" with Nigel and asks about his dad, Roy Evans (Tony Caunter); Pat says he is there in spirit. Afterwards, Barry mistakenly thinks a woman is interested in him. He asks about the Christmas present Nigel bought his wife, Debbie Bates (Nicola Duffett), but Nigel cannot remember, recalling only that he gave it to his friend, Phil Mitchell (Steve McFadden).

Nigel envisions younger versions of Phil (Daniel Delaney) and his brother, Grant Mitchell (Teddy Jay), fighting and breaks them up. When Nigel asks, Phil cannot recall any present. Phil and Grant ask Nigel to help steal turkeys, but he refuses. They toss a coin over who should approach a woman at the bar; Phil admits he let Grant win because he does not want anything to come between them. Nigel grows anxious about the missing present and accuses Phil of lying and breaking his promise to look after him.

In the present day, Nigel's friends gather at the community centre to watch his film. Phil finds the present in his pocket and goes to look for Nigel. In the café, Kathy Beale (Gillian Taylforth) challenges Phil, suggesting professional care so he can enjoy Nigel's good moments. Phil rejects the idea, insisting he promised Nigel he would care for him.

Nigel imagines a near-empty pub, where Pat, Barry and barmaid Tracey (Jane Slaughter) reflect his fears about the gift and becoming a burden. Hearing "The Power of Love", Nigel imagines dancing with his first wife Debbie, who reassures him she will always be with him. When Nigel realises she wants him in care, he becomes distressed and snaps back to the present, where his current wife, Julie Bates (Karen Henthorn), comforts him. Confused and upset, Nigel becomes violent, barging Phil with a bar stool and locking him and Julie out of the pub.

Phil angrily clears the community centre after misinterpreting laughter as mockery. Alone, he watches the film and is struck by a scene about letting go. Meanwhile, Nigel imagines Grant, Debbie, Barry, Phil and Pat again before returning fully to reality. Julie shows him the present and opens it to reveal an engraved necklace, helping Nigel remember who she is. She reassures him they will cope together. Returning home, Phil apologises to Julie for avoiding the reality of Nigel's dementia and accepts that care options must be explored. Alone in the kitchen, Julie breaks down in tears. In the Square gardens, Phil explains his decision to Nigel, who gently reassures him that he needs to let him go.

== Production ==
=== Background ===
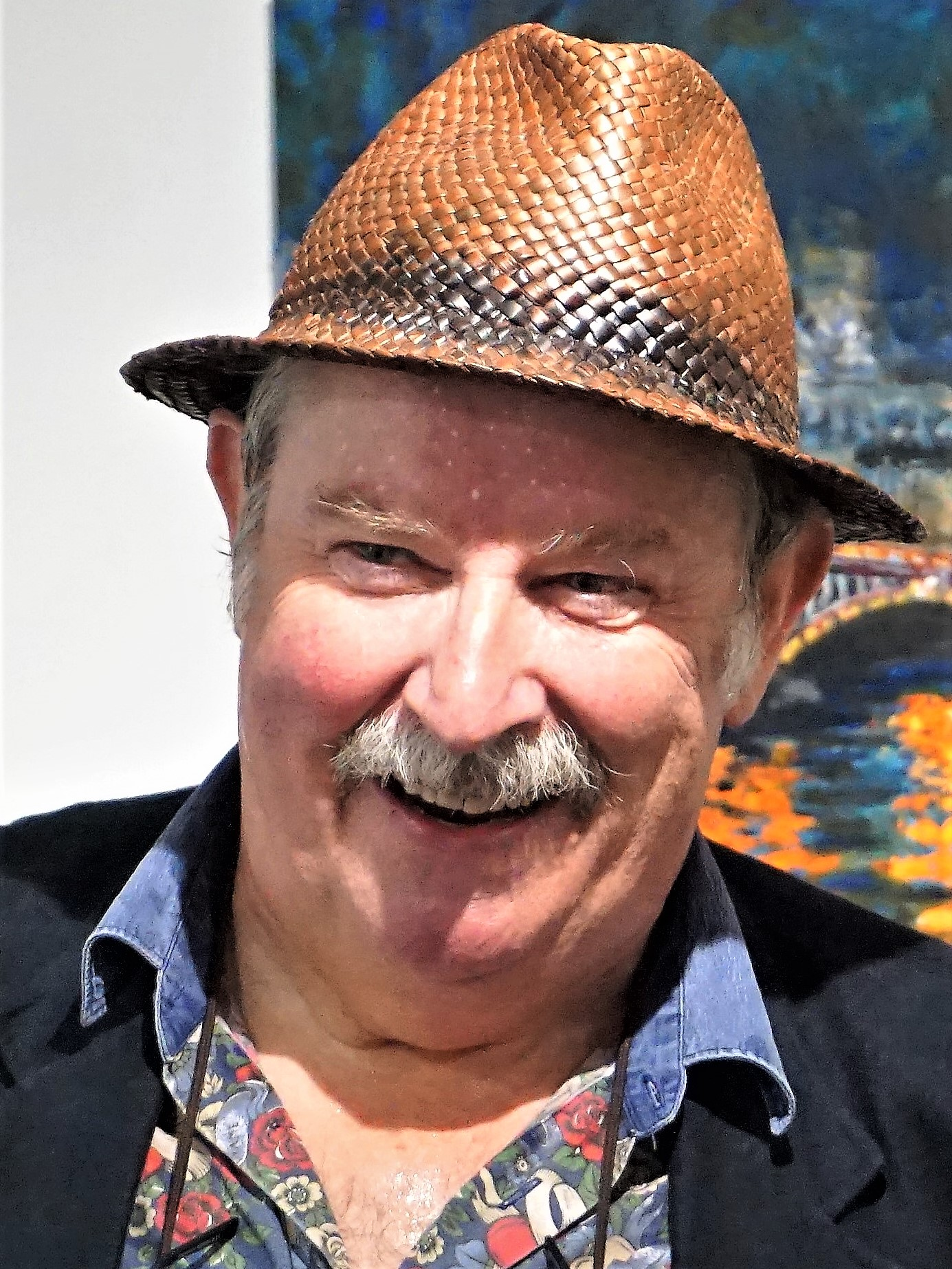
The episode focuses on Nigel Bates (Paul Bradley, pictured).

Paul Bradley reprised his role as Nigel Bates in December 2024, having left the show in 1998. His character was portrayed as homeless and estranged from his wife, Julie Bates (Karen Henthorn), creating "a lot of mystery" surrounding his situation. Later scenes revealed that Nigel had returned to Walford, the soap's setting, following a diagnosis of early onset dementia. Producers wanted to explore the realities of living with dementia over an extended period of time using the character of Nigel. They worked with the charity Dementia UK to portray the story accurately, which then-executive producer Chris Clenshaw believed was "so vital".

Karen Harrison Dening, the head of research and publications for the charity, said that the EastEnders production team had demonstrated "a strong commitment to delivering a sensitive depiction". Dementia UK's CEO, Hilda Hayo, spoke of her delight that the show would help to raise awareness for an "often misunderstood" condition. A lot of the story was presented through the lens of Nigel's long-standing friendship with Phil Mitchell (Steve McFadden). Clenshaw's successor, Ben Wadey, described the plot as "a tragic story of watching your friend slowly, you know, disappear from you" and credited Bradley and McFadden with crafting "a beautiful friendship" between Nigel and Phil that the audience could relate to.

=== Conception and writing ===
Wadey took over from Clenshaw as executive producer midway through 2025. He was challenged with how to progress Nigel's story and spoke at length with the story team to decide on its next steps. They chose to explore what Christmas would be like for someone with dementia and their family, leading to the early development of "Episode 7246". In a behind-the-scenes video, Wadey explained that the story team knew they wanted to "celebrate the magic of Christmas" while also portraying Nigel's "heartbreaking story". When devising the show's Christmas and New Year episodes, Wadey and the show's story team decided to follow a "past, present, future" theme across a series of episodes. He was keen to not just focus on producing an "amazing" Christmas Day episode, but developing "a series of treats" across the festive period. The theme of the past was explored through "Episode 7246", which is a special episode linked to Nigel's dementia story as his symptoms intensify. Wadey deemed the episode "really fitting as a love letter to the show [and] a love letter to the fans".

The episode's plot follows Nigel as his memories become confused with his reality and he believes he is in the 1990s encountering people from his past. Bradley explained that Nigel is "trying to get a grip on his sanity". Nigel enters an empty The Queen Victoria pub, one of the show's main settings, and imagines characters that have been killed off. A show spokesperson told Lily Shield-Polyzoides from Inside Soap that although it is a "delight" for the audience, it is "very disorientating" for Nigel as he struggles to understand what is happening around him. Wadey explained that the story team decided to "go back into [Nigel's] memories and meet the people he remembers best". Nigel goes to the Vic after overhearing Phil and Julie arguing about his care. When Phil eventually realises that he and Julie need help to care for Nigel effectively, he prepares to have an "emotional conversation" with him, concluding the episode. Wadey explained that Nigel reaches a point where he "realises that it's time for him to start saying goodbye", supported by the people who "he cares about most deeply".

"Episode 7246" was written by Richard Davidson. Wadey opined that Davidson had done "a beautiful job" with the episode's script. Whilst he thought it to be brave to include such an emotional episode in the Christmas period, Wadey was of the opinion that they had a responsibility to showcase a "real range of emotions" because Christmas can be "a tough time for people as well as a really happy time". Kyri Zindilis produced the episode, which he described as "an honour" and "an absolute gift". Commenting on the work from the show's cast and crew, Wadey said, "the whole team came together and really pulled their A game into it".

"Episode 7246" was announced on 13 November 2025 with the confirmation that Pam St Clement would reprise her role as Pat Evans for the episode. The character's return was teased beforehand on social media through a picture of Pat's trademark earrings hanging on a Christmas tree. Pat appears as a figment of Nigel's imagination, having been killed off in 2012. Wadey pitched the episode to St Clement first and was thrilled when she agreed to return, using this to sign up other former cast members. When St Clement agreed to return, Wadey ran through the EastEnders story office in celebration. St Clement expressed her surprise and excitement at appearing in the episode and the story, commenting, "It was just like coming home." She felt "a bit bowled over" to be asked to reprise the role, but found it "interesting" to portray the role within a time period that she was actually playing the role. Wadey was thrilled that St Clement could star in the episode and called it a "delight" to "see Pat and Pam back in The Queen Vic as she helps Nigel in his time of need". He had really wanted to find an opportunity for Pat to return because it had been a personal wish to work with St Clement.

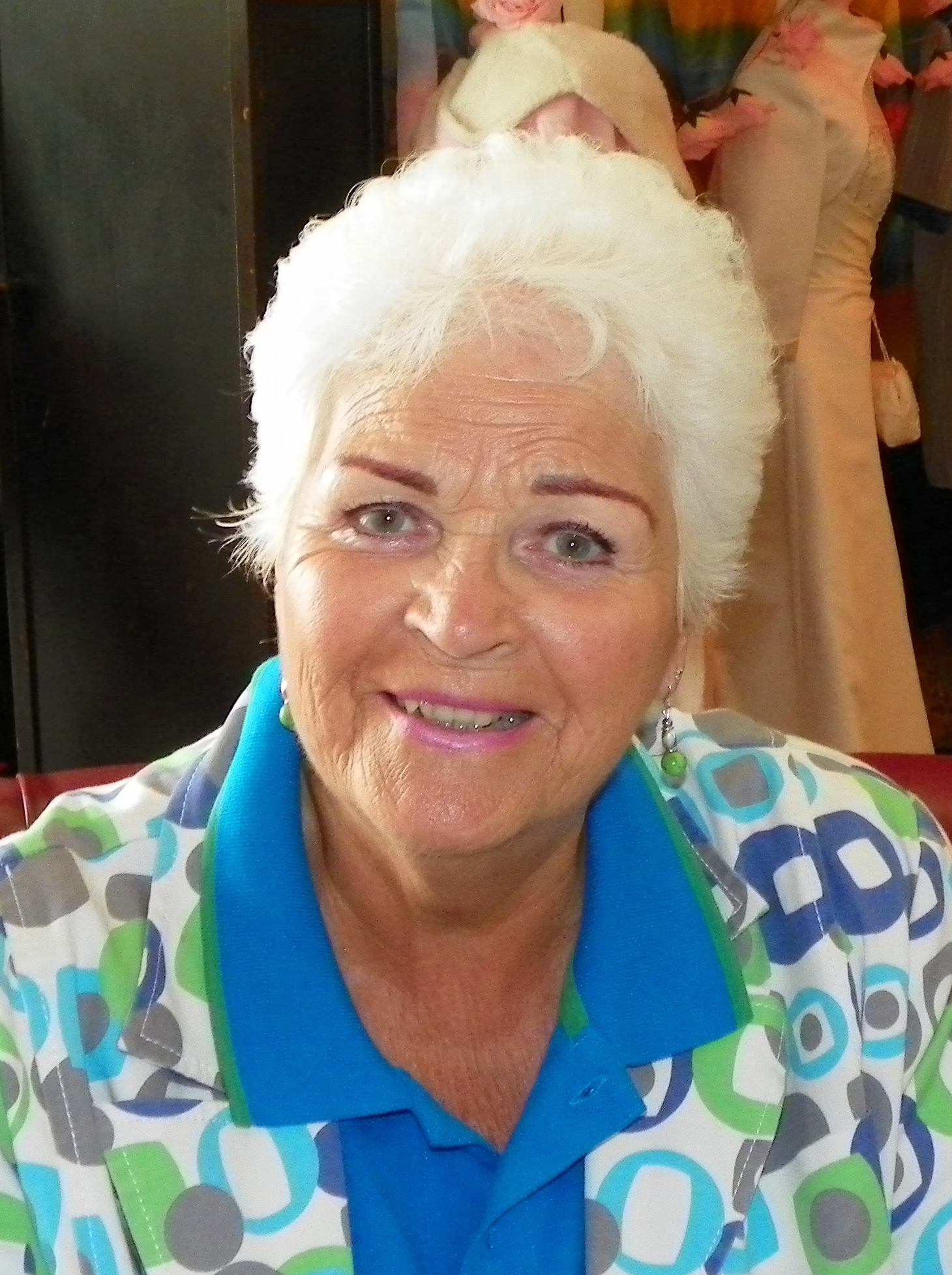
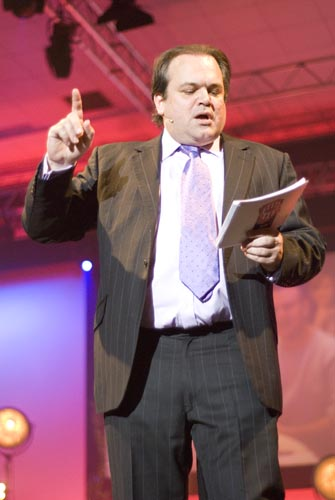
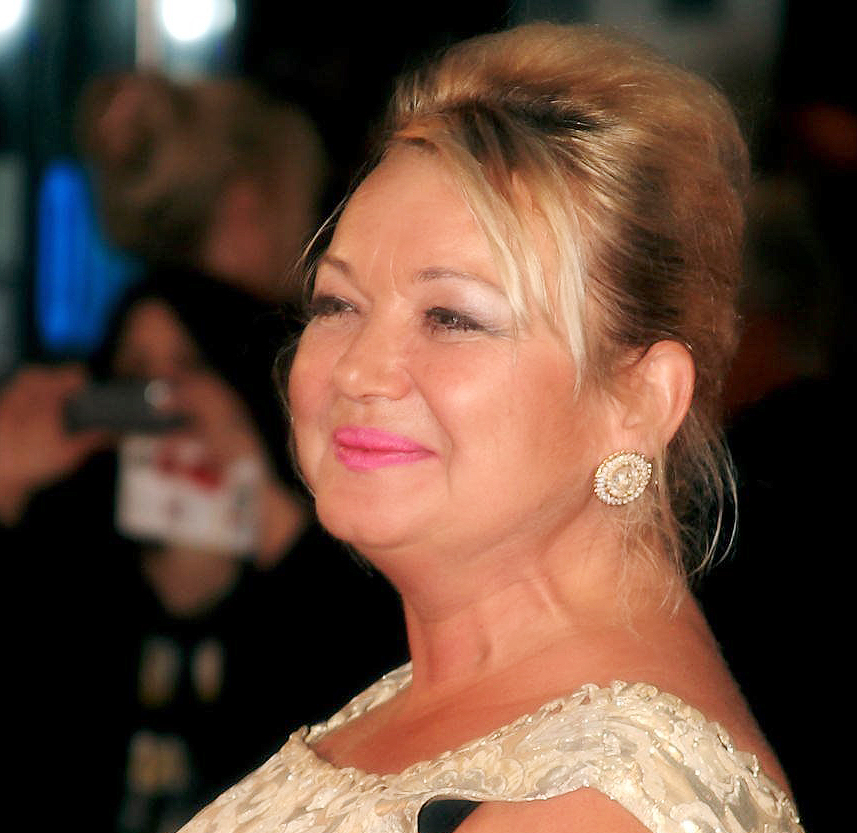
"Episode 7246" features guest appearances of former cast members Pam St Clement (Pat Evans), Shaun Williamson (Barry Evans) and Nicola Duffett (Debbie Bates) (l-r).

Two days later, Shaun Williamson's return in the role of Barry Evans for the episode was announced. Having been killed off in 2004, Barry also appears as a figment of Nigel's imagination. In the show's narrative, Barry shares a feud with Pat, his stepmother, but writers detracted from this by having the pair work together to support Nigel. Williamson received a call from his agent informing him that EastEnders producers wanted him to reprise the role, which surprised the actor. He had deemed it "impossible" to return following his character's death and always ruled out "returns from the dead". However, when the episode was explained to him and he read the script, he realised the return was "credible" so he agreed to reprise the role. Williamson admitted that he was nervous to film on the show's set again. The actor felt a personal connection to the episode's plot as his mother had dementia prior to her death in 2022. He noted, "That's why I thought returning was such a great idea, and why the story hit me so deeply." Williamson also cited the recent death of Tony Caunter, who portrayed Barry's father Roy Evans, as another reason to reprise the role. Wadey called it "a privilege" to have Williamson back for "Episode 7246".

In an interview with The Sun, Williamson revealed that Nicola Duffett had also reprised her role as Debbie Bates for the episode. Debbie is Nigel's first wife and was killed off in 1995. The show's publicity team did not confirm the appearance, however, Carla Feric of The Standard also reported on 21 December 2025 that Duffett would appear in the episode. Duffett admitted that she cried when she first read the episode's script. She was excited to work with Bradley again, having also worked with him on Holby City. On returning to the set, she commented, "It's easy just to walk into and be here again". She concluded that it had been "a fun experience" reprising the role of Debbie. Feric also reported that Daniel Delaney and Teddy Jay would reprise their roles as the younger versions of Phil Mitchell and Grant Mitchell, respectively. Although they had appeared in the soap before, "Episode 7246" marked the first time Delaney and Jay had filmed on The Queen Victoria pub set. Delaney expressed his gratitude at appearing in "such a meaningful Eastenders [sic] storyline", having experienced dementia within his own family. Jay shared his delight at being asked to play Grant again and called it "a real privilege" to work with the episode's cast.

=== Filming ===
"Episode 7246" was directed by Richard Lynn, whose direction was described as beautiful by Wadey. Lynn signed on to direct the episode in July 2025. He was excited to direct the episode as he was reunited with people he had worked with in the 1990s as a runner and assistant director on the soap. It was filmed in October 2025. The episode was primarily set in the show's fictional pub setting of The Queen Victoria with scenes set in both the present day and the 1990s. Filming for the 1990s scenes took place over one and a half days and used only half of the set. Lynn wanted to use the set creatively to reflect what Nigel would be thinking as he deteriorates and carefully planned out the set with Jonathan Smith, the show's senior designer.

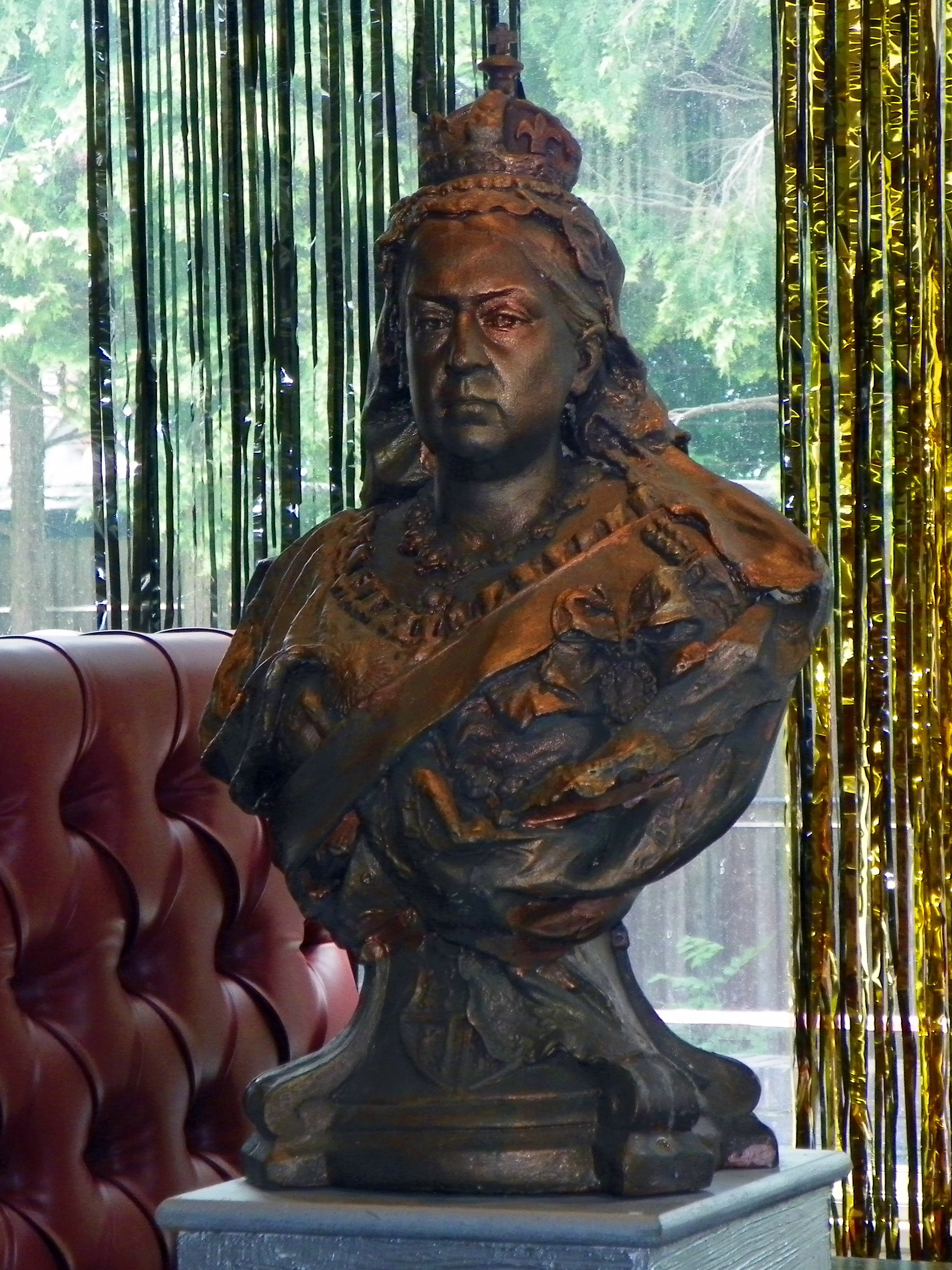
The bust of Queen Victoria, which is situated on the end of fictional The Queen Victoria bar, was painted grey to match its appearance in the 1990s.

The show's art and construction departments spent three and a half days redecorating the set of the Vic to replicate its appearance in the 1990s. The set painters took a day to wallpaper the set to match the original 1990s wallpaper. Smith began the process by examining screenshots of scenes in the Vic from episodes originally broadcast in the 1990s, focusing on the backgrounds and props featured. He appreciated many older episodes being made available on BBC iPlayer for this, calling it a "godsend". Many elements of the Vic were then replicated for the 1990s scenes in "Episode 7246". The art department hired or purchased some items and created some items themselves. They were able to obtain a replica of the slot machine used in the 1990s for the episode. Smith examined close-up screenshots of the tills and the pub tables to ensure that the props, such as cigarettes, ashtrays and glasses, were consistent with the original 1990s set. Consequently, in "Episode 7246", characters can be seen smoking indoors in the background of scenes.

In the 1990s, the Queen Victoria bust situated on the end of the bar was a grey colour without a crown on its head, which differs from the bust used in modern scenes. To ensure continuity, the art department repurposed a spare bust by painting it grey and adding a Santa hat to hide the crown. The coverings of the pub's booths also needed to be changed to reflect their 1990s design, which the art department were able to do. One challenge the art department faced was ensuring the price board was reflective of the decade it was set. Smith scrutinised many screenshots, looking in the background of scenes, to identify what prices were shown on the board. It took between one and a half to two days for the set to be returned to its modern style at the end of filming the 1990s scenes. One scene showed Barry drinking a pint of lager with Nigel. Williamson was given non-alcohol lager to drink, which he did not like the taste of. St Clement remarked how realistic the set looked and commented, "it was like stepping back in time". Likewise, Jane Slaughter, who portrays barmaid Tracey, called it a "mindblow" to see the Vic decorated from a period of time that she worked there. The costume and makeup department had to ensure that the characters in the 1990s scenes looked to be of that era. Wadey praised their work and "attention to detail".

St Clement admitted that getting into Pat's costume and make-up was "strangely difficult", which she had not expected. She believed that she had "divested" herself of Pat since her exit in 2012, but recognised that the audience had not due to the many repeats on television. The actress felt that it was her character's signature earrings that helped her to get back into the role. Williamson found it strange to return to the set and thought the Vic set seemed smaller. He did not find it difficult to play Barry again due to his experience portraying the role in other series, but admitted to feeling nervous walking onto the Vic set. The actor felt that working with Bradley and St Clement made him feel at ease. Duffett described the experience as "familiar" due to the dressing of the Vic set and the appearances of cast members she knew. She and Bradley agreed that they had "picked up the same relationship" very quickly in filming.

== Promotion and broadcast ==
External videos
- "A bridge to the past..." A promotional video for the episode.
- "The opening scene of the episode" A scene from the episode released for promotion.

The episode was promoted prior to its broadcast at a press event for the show's Christmas episodes. Wadey, St Clement and Williamson also promoted the episode through press interviews. To reflect the show's past, present and future theme across the Christmas and New Year period, a promotional video for "Episode 7246" was released on social media with the caption, "A bridge to the past...". The video showed a picture of Phil and Grant in the 1990s before panning to a Christmas tree bauble with a multi-directional sign pointing to past, present and future inside. The voices of Phil, Julie and Nigel can be heard over the video. A scene from the episode was released on 23 December 2025 to further promote the episode.

"Episode 7246" was first broadcast on 23 December 2025 in the United Kingdom. The episode was released on streaming platform BBC iPlayer at 06:00, prior to its television broadcast at 19:30 on BBC One.

== Reception ==
"Episode 7246" was watched by 2.1 million viewers overnight in its initial television broadcast. It was longlisted for "Best Showstopper" at the 2026 Inside Soap Awards.

Liam De Brun from the Manchester Evening News described the episode as "emotional" and "one of the biggest episodes of the year" for EastEnders. He added that it "didn't leave a dry eye in the house". He called Debbie's return "a major twist", and observed that viewers were "left completely broken" by her return. Stephen Patterson of the Metro described "Episode 7246" as "highly emotional". Yasmin Yince, writing for the Daily Mirror, labelled the episode "the show's most powerful episode ever airs, complete with iconic returns and a heartbreaking future for Nigel Bates." She added that although the returns of Pat, Barry and Debbie had been announced in advance, "viewers were still swept away by how sensitively the soap addressed Nigel's illness". The reporter also observed that viewers with personal experience of dementia had praised the episode's realism.

The Radio Times' Michael Adams said the episode is "understandably tragic and highly emotional given the nature of the storyline". He opined that the returns of former characters created "a real nostalgia fest for viewers". Adams' colleague, Johnathon Hughes, wrote in his review of the episode, "The ghost of Christmas past appears to Nigel, but it's not Jacob Marley's chains he hears rattling in a deserted Queen Vic — it's the clatter of a dangling gaudy earring belonging to the legendary Pat Evans." He added that the episode was "proof that there really are ghosts around every corner of Albert Square."

In an opinion piece for Digital Spy, Erin Zammitt praised "Episode 7246", naming it "undoubtedly one of the best episodes of the year". She commended Bradley's "nuanced and erratic" performance, stating that his "vulnerability as Nigel was the key to why this instalment worked so well". She added that his performance would be relatable for families supporting someone with dementia. Zammitt also praised the performances of Henthorn and McFadden. She said that the episode highlighted "why the soap was so right" to reintroduce Julie into the story, and praised McFadden's "exceptional" work as Phil realised and then told Nigel that he could not longer care for him. Zammitt assessed that the episode was "very carefully crafted" and appreciated the finer details of the set design and the costume and makeup; she listed extra Tracey's (Jane Slaughter) hair being its original darker colour as an example.

Zammitt enjoyed the appearances of Pat and Barry, but thought it may have been better had their appearances not been announced beforehand. She also liked Debbie's return and opined it was "emotional to see these two characters reunited after 30 years as Nigel mixed up the two great loves of his life." However, it was the "incredibly well-casted" Delaney and Jay's appearance as the younger version of Phil and Grant that Zammitt labelled the episode's "underrated highlight" because she believed it made sense for Nigel to envision these versions of the characters. The reviewer appreciated the writing of their scene as she believed it portrayed Phil as "a kind, selfless friend" throughout his tenure, reflecting how the character has been written over the course of Nigel's dementia plot. Zammitt concluded that, "Nigel's story has been one of the soap's strengths over the last year – and this poignant episode will be one of the highlights of the festive season."
