= Mel Owen =

Fictional character from EastEnders

- EastEnders character
- Portrayed by: Tamzin Outhwaite
- Duration: 1998–2002, 2018–2019
- First appearance: Episode 1683; 19 October 1998
- Last appearance: Episode 6021; 14 November 2019
- Introduced by: Matthew Robinson (1998); John Yorke (2018)
- Book appearances: Steve Owen: Still Waters (2001)
- Spin-off appearances: EastEnders: The Podcast (2018)
In-universe information
- Other names: Mel Healy; Mel Beale; Melanie Jane Owen
- Occupation: Shop assistant; Barmaid; Club manager; Caterer; Business consultant; Nightclub-owner; Businesswoman
- Family: Beale
- Father: Jeff Healy
- Mother: Jane Healy
- Brothers: Alex Healy
- Sisters: Katie Healy
- Husband: Ian Beale (1999–2001); Steve Owen (2001–2002); Ray Kelly (backstory, void; 2019, void)
- Sons: Hunter Owen
- Stepsons: Steven Beale; Peter Beale
- Stepdaughters: Lucy Beale

Melanie "Mel" Owen (also Healy and Beale) is a fictional character from the BBC soap opera EastEnders, played by Tamzin Outhwaite. Mel was introduced by executive producer Matthew Robinson and made her first appearance on 19 October 1998. Outhwaite made her departure on 12 April 2002. Outhwaite's return to the series was announced in October 2017 and she returned on 9 January 2018. Her departure was announced in July 2019 following Outhwaite's decision to leave and her final episode aired on 14 November 2019 when Mel was killed-off. Outhwaite proved popular in the role, winning multiple awards and critical acclaim for her portrayal of Mel as the character became prominent in the show.

During her original tenure in the soap, Mel was featured in high-profile storylines, such as a wedding to local businessman Ian Beale (Adam Woodyatt) to mark the Millennium Eve celebrations on New Year's Eve 1999; a problematic and dangerous marriage to criminal Steve Owen (Martin Kemp); a one-night stand with Steve's nemesis Phil Mitchell (Steve McFadden); and a close friendship with Phil's estranged girlfriend Lisa Shaw (Lucy Benjamin). Writers also placed Mel at the centre of a storyline marking the show's increase to four weekly episodes in 2001, when she is kidnapped by her ex-lover Dan Sullivan (Craig Fairbrass) after Steve and Phil conspired to frame him for the latter's shooting (see Who Shot Phil?).

Throughout her time on the show, especially since her 2018 return, when Mel became more of a villain, she has become somewhat more "wicked" and has a harder edge, when compared to her early appearances. In her second stint on the show, Mel was included in storylines such as working for crime boss Ciara Maguire (Denise McCormack); colluding with Phil against Ciara's ex-husband Aidan Maguire (Patrick Bergin); a relationship with Phil's rival Jack Branning (Scott Maslen); an engagement and marriage with former policeman Ray Kelly (Sean Mahon); covering up Ray's murder after he was shot dead by her son Hunter Owen (Charlie Winter) for attempting to kill her; and trying to stop Hunter from going to prison and later harboring him when he escapes, which culminates with Hunter being shot dead by the police after he held her hostage and nearly shot Phil and Lisa's daughter Louise Mitchell (Tilly Keeper) after shooting her brother Ben Mitchell (Max Bowden). Following Hunter's death, Mel developed a feud with Phil's wife Sharon (Letitia Dean) and blackmailed her after learning of her affair with Louise's boyfriend Keanu Taylor (Danny Walters). This concludes with Mel being involved in a high-speed car chase with Sharon upon attempting to expose her affair with Keanu to Phil, only to end up subjected to a vehicle collision that results in Sharon rescuing Mel, before Mel is then killed after walking into the path of an incoming lorry.

== Creation and development ==
=== Background and casting ===
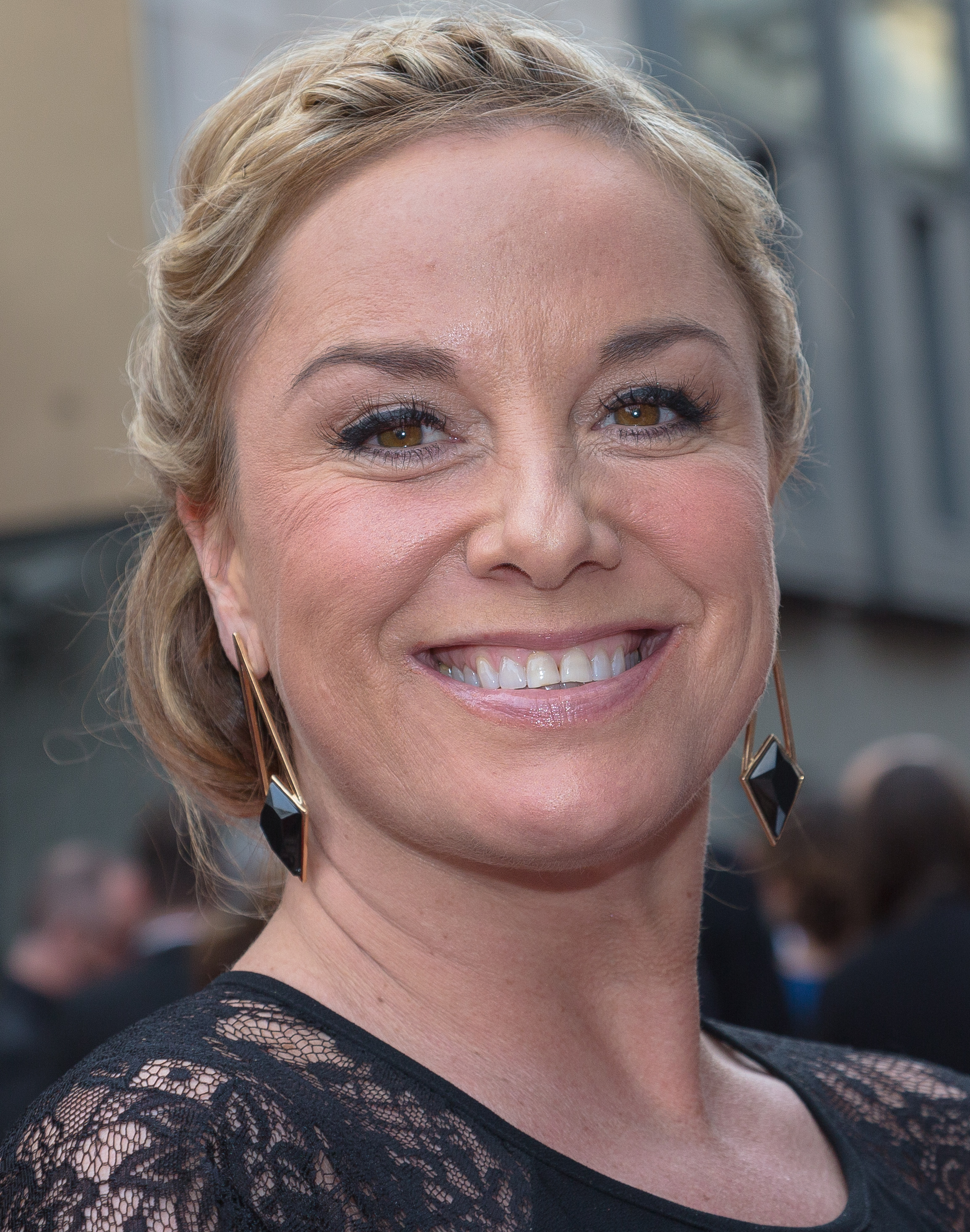
Tamzin Outhwaite (pictured) was cast as Mel Owen in 1998.

In 1998, EastEnders acquired a new executive producer, Matthew Robinson. Robinson was dubbed "the axeman" in the British press, after a large proportion of the EastEnders cast either quit, or were culled, shortly after Robinson's introduction. It was reported that Robinson hoped the changes would attract more viewers and "spice up [the soap's fictional setting of] Walford".

To counteract the large number of departures, Robinson introduced several new characters, among them Melanie Healy played by Tamzin Outhwaite. In an interview with website Walfordweb, Matthew Robinson has stated that Melanie was "dreamt up to supplement the 'totty' contingent – running thin at the time". Robinson stated that Tamzin Outhwaite was "a shoo-in – and not just because of her beautiful blonde hair. Within a minute of her walking into auditions, hundreds already having trooped in and out of the door, I knew we had our star." Outhwaite has stated that she was given the role without having to do a screen-test. Mel was brought into the serial as a member of the already established Healy family, joining her brother Reverend Alex Healy (Richard Driscoll) and father Jeff Healy (Leslie Schofield) in October 1998. Initially Mel's relationship with Alex and Jeff was not disclosed to viewers, and it was several weeks after her introduction that Mel actually came face-to-face with her brother on-screen; it was revealed that she had been estranged from them for some time.

=== Characterisation ===
Author Kate Lock has described Mel as free-spirited, exuberant, a beauty, wild-at-heart, and "a restless soul with a troubled past". In his assessment of the character, author Rupert Smith surmised Mel as "a nice girl with surprisingly bad taste in men."

Mel has been dubbed as a chameleon, and Outhwaite has suggested that she liked to bring variation to Mel's characterisation: "When I arrived I liked the idea Mel was feisty and strong. I didn't want her turning into a wimpy character like so many women in soaps. You know, they're either bitches or they're slags or they're victims. I wanted to give Mel a bit of everything. Every woman has all those elements to their character. It's just working out where they come and go, and I don't think that's lack of continuity; I think that's a three-dimensional character."

Outhwaite has suggested that the wardrobe department struggled to come up with a static identity for Melanie at first; however, this she felt turned out to be a good thing: "What I really liked about it was, when we started looking for costumes [for Mel], the wardrobe department couldn't quite fit where I was going. I'd wear Army pants and trainers some days and then jeans some other days and then I'd be all suited and booted at other times. I said, 'That's what girls do! That's how I am. Some days I'm in scruffs and some days I'm really dressed up. It would be really nice to have a character who's not so predictable.'" Rosalind Powell, head of the EastEnders' wardrobe design team in 2000, said that Mel had "colourful and stylish" wardrobe from retailers such as Kookai and Oasis. Powell added, "Although she's a barmaid, she can still afford to wear nice clothes, she just doesn't have a very big wardrobe."

=== Relationships ===
==== Millennium Eve episodes ====
An unlikely romance was scripted into Mel's narrative when she began dating her boss Ian Beale (Adam Woodyatt). The pairing has been described as one of "the most unbelievable soap couples", but Outwaite defended it in 1999, saying "I know I've fancied some not particularly attractive men in my time, but I don't think Ian is actually ugly. He has a vulnerable side and that's what is attractive. When he is being all hot-headed and gets above himself then I personally don't like Ian. But when he is being vulnerable I can see the attraction. People talk to me about it all the time. I have taxi drivers telling me I could do much better than Ian. The other day someone shouted that I should go back with [Mel's former fling] Steve Owen. It's incredible, they'd rather [Mel] went out with [Steve who is] a murderer than with [Ian, who is] a hard-working father raising three children." Their relationship was the focus of the storyline that aired to mark the Millennium celebrations, when Ian emotionally blackmailed Mel into marrying him by claiming that his daughter was dying of cancer; storylines in the latter part of 1999 focused on the build-up to a joint Millennium wedding on New Year's Eve 1999 with Barry Evans (Shaun Williamson) and Natalie Evans (Lucy Speed). The wedding went as planned; however, Mel and Ian's marriage ended hours later as the clock struck midnight to signify the beginning of the New Year after Mel discovered Ian's lie. The Millennium Eve episodes drew in 20.89 million viewers – the biggest soap audience since the character Tiffany Mitchell (Martine McCutcheon) was killed off in EastEnders precisely one year earlier (New Year's Eve 1998). An EastEnders spokeswoman commented: "This is a remarkable endorsement of the power of EastEnders that over 20 million viewers chose to see the Millennium celebrations in Albert Square." The episodes were also broadcast on screens in London's Trafalgar Square, a typical "haunt for New Year's Eve revelers".

==== Relationship with Steve Owen ====
A more long-running pairing was featured between Mel and the character Steve Owen (Martin Kemp), who was portrayed as a villain. It was an on/off romance beginning shortly after both characters' introduction in 1998. In an interview in June 2000, Kemp discussed the relationship between Steve and Mel: "Steve's convinced Mel will make his life complete. She kept him going during all the bad times and now he's determined to have her. It's true of a lot of guys who get into trouble, they hang their hat on one idea and that keeps them sane [...] there's a driving force that kept them going while they were [in prison]. And often that's a woman. You know from those tender moments when Mel came to visit Steve [in prison] that she was the thing that kept him going, and he won't stop til he gets her back." Eventually the couple were shown to marry in the soap in March 2001, despite a revelation that Mel had strayed with Steve's nemesis Phil Mitchell (Steve McFadden). Tamzin Outhwaite explained, "With Ian, Mel was the one who didn't want to go through with it. This time around Mel is the one who is apprehensive, hoping Steve will be there for her. If he isn't, she has no reason to stay in Walford. This really is make or break time for her." The wedding night was a precursor to one of the soap's most publicised storylines, "Who Shot Phil?", where Phil was gunned down by an unknown assailant and, due to Mel's infidelity, Steve became one of the prime suspects for the murder attempt, though he transpired to be a red herring. Discussing Mel and Steve's wedding, Outhwaite said, "Even though this wedding with Steve has got as much controversy as Mel's last one [with Ian], it feels more true. The characters seem more suited and it's not a big, white wedding, it's a low-key register office thing." 17 million viewers watched the wedding.

In August 2001, EastEnders began airing a 4th weekly episode. The storyline to mark the occasion centred around Mel, her husband Steve, and her former lovers Phil and Dan Sullivan (Craig Fairbrass). After Phil and Steve wrongfully framed Dan for Phil's shooting, Dan sought revenge by kidnapping Mel and demanding a ransom. An EastEnders insider reportedly told The Mirror, "This has be [sic] one of the most dramatic storylines we have ever filmed. Dan has vowed to get even with Phil and Steve for framing him over the shooting. Kidnapping Mel kills two birds with one stone. Although Mel and Phil have had their differences, he still harbours feelings for her." As part of the storyline, Outhwaite, as Mel, was tied up to a radiator in a council flat. Outhwaite commented, "They offered to untie my wrists between scenes, but I said no so I could feel what it was really like. My wrists were raw by the end of it and I was exhausted, but that was the challenge I wanted."

Although Mel was rescued, the events on the storyline had ramifications for Mel and Steve's marriage after Dan told Mel that Steve had been unfaithful. This led to the temporary screen exit of Outhwaite who had been permitted time off from filming to make another TV series. This was part of a lucrative deal that Outhwaite made with the BBC, where Outhwaite reportedly agreed to remain on EastEnders for a further year if she was allowed to film other TV shows. In the storyline, Mel ended her marriage with Steve and departed after torching his club, ignoring his sobbing and begging. According to Outhwaite, "Steve was a rat and fully deserved it." Mel returned after two months away and began negotiating divorce, however the divorcing was brief as Steve was killed off in the serial in March 2002 after Kemp decided to leave. His death storyline centred upon his on-going feud with Phil.

=== Departure (2002) ===
Following Martin Kemp's decision to quit EastEnders, Outhwaite announced she was quitting the soap in the autumn of 2001, stating, "I'm not sure what was left for Mel to do after she had been kidnapped, been married twice, burnt down a club and slept with her best friend's boyfriend [...] To be honest with you, Mel's role in EastEnders has come to a kind of natural end. I always said I'd go when I felt that the character had run her course, and I'm going to leave when my contract runs out next year [...] Martin and I are in very similar situations with our characters. We came in at a similar time, and now it looks like we'll leave at a similar time, too. Mel and Steve had some kind of aura, a chemistry, that was unique. I was really proud of it." She added, "I'll always be indebted to EastEnders for providing me with a wonderful start to my career on television and the opportunity to play a character like Mel has been fabulous. I felt it was time to move on and try on a new coat – new characters, new challenges." EastEnders' executive producer John Yorke said of Outhwaite's departure, "Tamzin has created one of the most-loved characters and (with Martin Kemp) one half of the most-admired on-screen couple in EastEnders since the show started. She has been fantastic to work with and we wish her all the luck in her career." Yorke added that the character would be welcome back any time.

Mel's exit storyline was linked to Steve's death, and Outhwaite claimed that viewers would be gripped by the storyline right up until her own exit a few months after Steve's. She commented, "Mel is relived by Steve's death. Mel acts brave, but inside she is breaking. She is given a necklace of black pearls on the day Steve dies. She falsely believes Phil was involved in the death but can't prove it. He has been nothing but trouble for her and she won't try to build bridges now [...] Mel looks brave on the outside but inside she's cracking up." In the on-screen events, Mel's anger turns to devastation when Phil informs her that Steve had been having sex with his sister Sam Mitchell (Kim Medcalf). After being arrested over Steve's money laundering and discovering she was pregnant with Steve's baby, Mel confronted everyone who had wronged her before leaving Walford. At the time, Outhwaite stated that her final scenes were the hardest that she'd ever filmed. Tony Stewart, critic for The Mirror suggested that Mel's exit in April 2002 was thrilling and described it as "a devastating story of betrayal and her ultimate revenge [as] one by one her friends desert her." Stewart praised Mel's final scene with the following description: "When she faces her last exit at Victoria Coach Station, there is a glint in her eye as Mel looks at the destination board and speaks on her mobile. 'Pick a number for me,' she says. 'One to 20. Great. Thank you.' And with that she is gone... but never forgotten."

=== Reintroduction (2018) ===
Outhwaite stated, after leaving the show, that she might return to the character if the time was right. In 2010 she commented that a return would be unlikely as the character did not have links in the current cast, and that, in any case, she had never been asked back, stating: "People always ask me, but I've never been asked! It looks like I'm turning it down on a yearly basis, but I'm not. They've never asked me! So they don't want me back for one and I don't have any family left on the show. There's nobody on the Square she knows, I don't even think any of Mel's friends are still in it... I could walk down the market and be an extra, I suppose! [...] She doesn't really know anyone apart from Ian Beale and Phil Mitchell. So unless she was coming back to see one of them..."

On 24 October 2017, the show's producers announced that Mel would be returning to the serial in 2018. Outhwaite, who billed Mel as "a strong independent woman", returned to filming in November 2017. Yorke, who was appointed executive consultant in June 2017, asked Outhwaite to reprise the role. The actress felt privileged to be invited back to the show and called playing Mel again "perfect". Outhwaite billed Mel as "a strong independent woman" upon her return and believed there are "lots more stories to tell" with the character. She commented, "EastEnders is in my DNA and I always knew deep down that someday I would revisit Mel." Yorke said he was "thrilled and flattered" to have Outhwaite reprise the role and looked forward to exploring her absence and "who Melanie Owen is now". He also promised an "incredible" storyline for Mel when she returns and said it would "awaken a lot of old ghosts, some great memories, and a whole new series of adventures too". On 22 December 2017, it was announced that Charlie Winter had been cast in the role of Hunter Owen, the son of Mel and Steve. Hunter returns alongside Mel. Mel returned on-screen in the closing moments of the episode broadcast on 9 January 2018.

=== Departure (2019) ===
In July 2019, it was announced that Outhwaite had opted to quit the role again, and Mel would depart during the year. The actress originally signed a year-long contract and planned to leave at its conclusion. However, she remained on the soap for an additional year before choosing to leave. Outhwaite explained that she wanted to pursue other roles after creating "good memories" of being in EastEnders again. Executive producer Jon Sen expressed his gratitude towards Outhwaite, who he dubbed an "incredible talent", for reprising the role, adding that she "[allowed] EastEnders fans the chance to see one of Walford's most popular characters take centre stage once more."

Producers created a storyline leading up to Mel's departure, in that she became involved in the high-profile affair between characters Sharon Mitchell (Letitia Dean) and Keanu Taylor (Danny Walters) after Hunter's death. A feud between Sharon and Mel started in September 2019 and played out towards her departure. The feud has become popular by fans on social media such as Twitter. A trailer was released on 1 November 2019, further promoting the feud and a dramatic car chase between the pair, which mirrors the way Mel's husband, Steve, was indirectly killed by Sharon's husband, Phil in 2002. Mel was killed off on 14 November after a major stunt, involving Sharon.

== Storylines ==
=== 1998–2002 ===
Mel had a troubled past: she owned a business in Camden that went bankrupt, was abused by a boyfriend, and was estranged from her family for some years – traveling around the Greek Islands before ultimately reuniting with her brother, vicar Alex Healy (Richard Driscoll), and their father Jeff (Leslie Schofield) in Walford from October 1998.

When she first arrived in the square, Mel started working for local businessman Ian Beale (Adam Woodyatt). They soon begin dating and Ian later requests Mel to help with his children; Mel finds the children hard to deal with at first but grows to love them. Ian and Mel plan to marry, but Mel gets cold feet – realising she doesn't truly love Ian. When Ian discovers this, he claims that his daughter Lucy (Casey Anne Rothery) is dying of cancer in a desperate bid to retain his romantic bond with Mel; she gives in and later agrees to marry him. The pair marry on 31st December 1999, in a double wedding with fellow neighbors Barry Evans (Shaun Williamson) and Natalie Evans (Lucy Speed). At their reception, however, Mel discovers a letter that Ian threw away – which officially gave Lucy the all-clear; she confronts Ian and, after he admits to lying about his daughter's health, dumps him just as the clock strikes midnight on 1st January 2000 and the new millennium begins.

After divorcing Ian and the exposure of his fabrication about Lucy's health, Mel starts a relationship with local publican Dan Sullivan (Craig Fairbrass). However, this ends when Mel learns from her best-friend Lisa Shaw (Lucy Benjamin) that Dan reported her boyfriend Phil Mitchell (Steve McFadden) reported him to the police about his motor scam. When Mel causes Phil to learn about what Dan did and gets revenge, Dan vows to get payback on Mel and starts harassing her – until her love interest, Steve Owen (Martin Kemp), comes to her rescue. Soon afterwards, Mel and Steve start a relationship after he forces Phil's cousin Billy Mitchell (Perry Fenwick) to help build her trust on him. They soon marry at the start of March 2001, despite Steve learning that Mel slept with Phil in a one-night stand on Christmas Night 2000. Just as Steve and Mel commence their honeymoon, Phil gets shot by a mystery assailant (see "Who Shot Phil?") and Steve is the prime suspect. Mel suspects it is him but he protests his innocence. Phil recovers from the shooting and confronts the culprit: Lisa. Steve forgives Mel and on Phil's instruction, he decides to frame Dan for the crime. Dan is wrongly imprisoned for Phil's attempted murder, and after his release, believing that it was Steve who actually shot him, kidnaps Mel in revenge. Dan demands a large sum of money and Steve grows desperate. During her few days of captivity, Dan tells Mel about Steve's dodgy dealings and criminal activities. Phil comes to her rescue and Dan flees. Mel takes time out after burning down her and Steve's club, the E20, as revenge for Steve's lies. She briefly dates Barry's half-brother Nathan Williams (Doug Allen), but later reconciles with Steve after he manages to woo her back into their marriage. However, when Steve's feud with Phil sparks out of control, he proposes to Mel that they start anew and plan to emigrate to America with Lisa, her boyfriend Mark Fowler (Todd Carty), and Lisa's daughter, Louise (Rachel Cox). However, Mark can't go having been denied a Visa due to his HIV and Lisa is torn as to what to do, the plan is falling apart but Steve absconds with Louise but Phil follows them and a car chase ensues; Steve swerves and crashes. Phil rescues Louise and is about to go back for Steve but is too late – the car explodes with Steve still inside, killing him.

Mel is heartbroken when Steve's web of deceit and lies are uncovered after his death. She discovers that Steve was having an affair with Phil's sister, Sam Mitchell (Kim Medcalf), and that Steve sold their club and house behind her back. On Lisa's wedding day to Mark, Mel is arrested for drug connections after she is implicated in Steve's drug smuggling; Mel had unwittingly signed Steve's paperwork, linking the drug smuggling back to her. Facing a long spell in prison, Phil bails her for £30,000 when she discovers that she is pregnant with Steve's child. She then discovers that Lisa was responsible for shooting Phil and that both knew it was not Steve, despite her continued suspicions. Feeling betrayed by everyone, she toasts herself before going to Portugal so Phil loses the £30,000. Later that year, Lisa and Louise join Mel in Portugal.

=== 2018–2019 ===
After nearly sixteen years away, Mel returns to Walford as she is working for her sister-in-law, Ciara Maguire (Denise McCormack), to track down money and jewellery that was stolen from Ciara in a recent robbery that took place in the area, and Ciara is keeping Mel's son, Hunter Owen (Charlie Winter), from her until Mel finds the money. Mel eventually discovers that Phil's wife, Sharon Mitchell (Letitia Dean) has the money, Mel double-crosses her so the money is returned and Mel is able to see Hunter again. Ciara does not have the full amount, so in retaliation, she vindictively tells Hunter that his father Steve died in a car explosion, not from a heart attack as Mel had claimed and that he was a villain who killed Saskia Duncan (Deborah Sheridan-Taylor). Mel is forced to tell Hunter that Steve killed Saskia in self-defence and that Steve framed Matthew Rose (Joe Absolom) and Steve's death was a result of a car chase. Mel later compares Hunter to Steve and asks for them to start again. Mel decides to remain in Walford, accepting Sharon's offer to re-open the nightclub, which she agrees to restore to its old name, the E20, in tribute to Steve, to keep Hunter happy. Jack Branning (Scott Maslen) pursues Mel but Hunter sabotages Jack's car to prevent them from going to France. Before the club's re-opening, Hunter finds out Phil was involved in Steve's death and Hunter blames Phil, so he has sex with Louise (now played by Tilly Keeper) in the office, knowing Phil will see it on CCTV. Phil is enraged and threatens to attack Hunter with a baseball bat but Mel seduces Phil and threatens to show Sharon the CCTV footage of their kiss to stop him from hurting Hunter. Mel and Jack argue after Mel tries to reunite Billy and Honey Mitchell (Emma Barton) by claiming that Billy has moved on. The argument leads to passion and Jack and Mel have sex. Ian decides he wants to marry Mel again and constantly tries to woo her, including offering Hunter a job at his restaurant. However, his efforts always go in vain. Following the re-opening of E20, Mel offers a cleaning contract to Kat Slater (Jessie Wallace), her cousin Stacey (Lacey Turner), their grandmother Mo Harris (Laila Morse) and Stacey's mother Jean (Gillian Wright).

Jack later proposes to Mel, and just as she is about to accept, her ex-husband, Ray Kelly (Sean Mahon) turns up. It is revealed that Ray worked as an undercover cop and his relationship with Mel became strained due to his increasingly secretive behaviour, ultimately leading to their divorce. Mel confronts Ray at home, where her feelings for him resurface and she sleeps with him, causing Jack to break up with her. Although Ray insists that he will be there for her and Hunter and decides that he wants to remarry Mel, Mel becomes paranoid again and she frequently enlists Jack's help to gather more information about Ray. She finds out that Ray is a millionaire, much to her dismay. Furthermore, he goes by the alias, Simon. She is later stunned when she discovers that Ray is married to another woman called Maddie, and he has a son with her. She befriends Maddie, who thinks that Ray is Simon. Maddie, a fitness trainer, meets up with Mel to train her, but Mel reveals the truth about Ray. Mel and Maddie go to a house, where they think one of Ray's girlfriends lives. They pretend to be two police officers and are stunned when the woman turns out to be a teenager. It is revealed that the young woman they are talking to is Ray's daughter from yet another marriage. Mel and Maddie meet up with his third wife, Nicola, who is equally shocked at Ray's betrayal. Mel convinces Nicola and Maddie to join her in her plan to expose Ray on their wedding day, New Year's Day, 2019. They agree, but when the day arrives, Ray discovers Mel's scheme and strangles her with her wedding veil. Thinking he has murdered Mel, Ray stashes her body into a closet and arrives at the church. He is stunned when Mel turns up and declares that she still wants to go ahead with the wedding, in order to obtain Ray's money. Otherwise, she will show everyone her bruises that Ray inflicted. Ray and Mel get married, but just as they walk out of the church, Ray is confronted by Maddie and Nicola. Moments later, the police arrive and arrest Ray for bigamy. Ray escapes, later, Ray bundles an aggressive Hunter into the boot of his car, driving to Walford Common, where Mel appears knowing he has her son and confronts him with a gun. Following a heated discussion, Mel finally finds Hunter bound and gagged on the ground, then, Ray coming at them both with a shovel, they, panicking, quickly get into a car. Mel reverses into Ray and buries him, believing him to be dead; he grabs her leg and starts throttling her again. To stop him murdering his mother, Hunter shoots Ray, killing him.

Hunter is arrested and Mel enters a lengthy legal battle to release her son from prison, though to no avail; he is imprisoned and Mel visits him. She becomes more reclusive and stressed without Hunter and tries to avenge Hunter's imprisonment by blaming Jack. Mel is informed by the police that Hunter will be transferred to a prison in the North of England for his safety, before being told that during a crash involving the prison van escorting him, he has escaped. Hunter eventually returns to Walford, and she conceals him in a derelict flat, where she tries to treat his wounds sustained in the crash. She plans to obtain fake passports and return to Portugal for a fresh start. When Hunter is healed, Mel smuggles him in the boot of her car and prepares to leave when Lisa returns, wanting Mel's help to smuggle Louise and her fiancé, Keanu Taylor (Danny Walters), out of the country; they agree for the five of them to move to Portugal. Mel learns that Hunter has escaped the car and taken her gun, Mel becomes panicked and tries to find him. In her search, she tries Jack's house, since Hunter wanted revenge on him for his imprisonment, and finds Jack's partner, Denise Fox (Diane Parish), unconscious on the floor after Hunter attacks her. She alerts the paramedics and goes to find Jack in The Queen Vic; she sees landlady Linda Carter (Kellie Bright) escorting him to the barrel store and realises that Hunter has ordered Linda to bring him there. Mel then cajoles Hunter in handing her the gun and they try to sneak him out of the pub unseen. When he is spotted, Hunter holds the pub hostage and shoots Ben Mitchell (Max Bowden); Mel tries to talk to him with no success and he takes Louise (now played by Tilly Keeper) hostage in Albert Square with armed police surrounding them. Hunter shoots Keanu and Mel urges him to stop his actions; Hunter threatens Louise's life; he is then shot dead by a police marksman and Mel cradles his body, devastated.

In the following weeks, Mel struggles in the aftermath and criticises Lisa for complaining about Louise when she is still alive. By way of apology for Ben and Louise, Mel takes flowers to the Mitchell home, where she keenly spots Keanu's overreaction to Lola Pearce (Danielle Harold) knocking a pregnant Sharon's stomach and, witnessing a secret conversation between Sharon and Keanu, she realises that Keanu is the father of Sharon's baby, not Phil. This follows Phil trying to disrupt Hunter's funeral and Sharon insulting Hunter during a row with Mel. Mel swears to Lisa, on Hunter's memory, vengeance against the Mitchells. She begins to blackmail Sharon with the knowledge of her baby's paternity. She asks for £20,000 and a villa in Portugal, threatening Sharon by using her son Dennis (Bleu Landau) to get to her. Over the coming weeks, Mel heightens her blackmail towards Sharon, who persuades Louise and Keanu to move in with Mel and Lisa. Mel sends Sharon away to find her a villa in Portugal for the four of them. Mel sells the club to Ruby Allen (Louisa Lytton) as well as getting Sharon to sell her share, which she eventually does. However, she tells Mel that she knows that Mel helped Hunter when he escaped prison, shocking her and leaving her unsettled. Mel continues getting closer to Louise's unborn baby, which frightens Lisa. Mel is upset when she finds out that Louise and Keanu do not want to move to Portugal but manages to manipulate Lisa and tells her that Sharon's unborn baby is not Phil's. Later, Mel looks at Hunter's old things and puts Louise's baby scan with it saying "Grandma Loves You". Mel continues to get closer to Louise and buys her a Citroën C3 Aircross for her 18th birthday. At the pub, Mel is shocked when Louise calls Sharon 'her second mum' and Mel pretends to poison Dennis when Sharon tells her to get over Hunter's death. Mel plans a party for Louise's 18th and Sharon's 50th, hinting that she will reveal everything there. Lisa later confronts Mel about her getting close to Louise and Mel hits her. On the day of the party, Lisa suggests that Mel sees a therapist but Mel refuses, telling her she's not mad like herself and tells Lisa it would've been better if she had killed herself. Mel leaves a voicemail to Phil, who is away, telling him that Sharon has sold the business; he subsequently decides to return on the next flight. Unknown to Mel, Sharon is furious and tells Keanu they need a plan as they both rush to the club to confront Mel, only to walk into her party where Louise is already there. Mel gloats at Sharon and is confronted by Lisa in the office, who unknown to Mel, has planned something with Sharon. Mel threatens to phone Phil and tell him everything. An altercation takes place and Mel's phone is smashed which results in both Mel and Sharon rushing to the airport to greet Phil first. Whilst driving, they encounter each other and Mel decides to phone Billy and tell him about Sharon and Keanu, telling him to put it on speaker and next to the microphone so that everyone at the party can hear, including Louise. However, she doesn't manage to announce it to everyone as she crashes into a broken down car. Mel's car overturns as Sharon looks on and the partygoers, including Lisa, listen in, horrified. Mel, still alive, and semi conscious inside the wreckage, believes that she can hear Hunter's voice calling to her. Sharon manages to pull Mel from the wreckage before her car explodes, but Mel keeps hearing Hunter's voice in her head. After Sharon pleads with her to end the feud, Mel accuses her of stopping her from going 'back to Hunter' and paces towards the car, where she believes Hunter to be. As she stumbles towards the burning car, Sharon looks on in horror as a lorry appears through the smoke from the wreckage, hitting Mel and killing her instantly. Sharon, Louise and Lisa are left horrified.

Lisa seeks revenge for Mel's death by telling Phil he is not the father of Sharon's baby. A few weeks later, Louise gives her daughter the middle name 'Melanie' in honour of her. On Christmas Day, Mel's meddling finally comes to fruition as Phil discovers Sharon's affair and throws her out as well as orchestrating Keanu's murder. Mel is mentioned by Sharon in February 2020 following Dennis's death, as she contemplates how she must have felt following Hunter's death.

== Reception ==
BBC News claimed in 2000 that Tamzin Outhwaite was one of EastEnders' most popular stars and Mel was described as one of the most popular characters on the show. During her stint it was reported that the BBC offered to increase her salary various times to entice her to stay with EastEnders with suggestions that she was the highest-paid British soap star. She was awarded 'Sexiest Female' at The British Soap Awards for three years running and 'Best Newcomer' at the National TV Awards. Outhwaite has discussed her popularity: "When I came in as the vicar's sister, I had no idea Mel would be such a big character and the audience would take to her so quickly. I was surprised as I thought she was a bit plain and a flirt. But no matter what Mel does – going out with Ian, Dan, Steve, Phil – people still like her. Women wanted to be her mate and blokes wanted her as a girlfriend." Outhwaite was reportedly told to tone down her performances as Mel in 2000, when her love scenes were branded "too realistic for family viewing." Viewers were only shown a censored version of her love scene with Dan Sullivan. Tamzin stated, "I was told that this was to be a scene in which I really wanted Dan and that it should be full on but because it was before the watershed they thought it was too much."

The lead up to Mel and Ian's Millennium wedding included a hen/stag night celebration episode, which was filmed on-location in Amsterdam, the Netherlands. The episode evoked criticism by the Broadcasting Standards Commission for its inclusion of "almost relentless drunken and promiscuous behaviour, sexual innuendo and drug-taking, before the watershed", which included Mel having to kiss various strangers. The BBC defended the episode, claiming that its content would have "come as no surprise to viewers" and adding that the depiction of this behaviour conformed to an EastEnders tradition – that questionable conduct "only leads to further trouble...One character's quest for drugs led to embarrassment and nausea and a drinking binge led to the calling off of [Barry and Natalie's] wedding while the prospects for [Mel and Ian's] became bleaker."

In 2019, Laura-Jayne Tyler from Inside Soap praised Mel's returning, writing, "When Mel was first brought back to EastEnders, we were skeptical. Did we really care about her enough 16 years ago to give a flip now? But, if there is anything actress Tamzin Outhwaite has brought to the show, it's the ability to make us care about a character again. Tired as we are of hideous Hunter, he's given his mum a reason to channel her inner super-bitch. All hail, Queen Owen!" In 2020, Sara Wallis and Ian Hyland from The Daily Mirror placed Mel 18th on their ranked list of the Best EastEnders characters of all time, calling her a "vicar's sister with an unholy taste in men".

== See also ==
- List of soap opera villains
