= Barry Evans (EastEnders) =

Fictional character in the BBC soap opera EastEnders

- EastEnders character
- Portrayed by: Shaun Williamson
- Duration: 1994–2004, 2025
- First appearance: Episode 1072; 27 December 1994
- Last appearance: Episode 7246; 23 December 2025
- Introduced by: Barbara Emile (1994); Ben Wadey (2025)
In-universe information
- Occupation: Car salesman; Video shop manager; Bar manager
- Father: Roy Evans
- Mother: Doreen Evans
- Stepmother: Pat Butcher
- Half-brothers: Nathan Williams
- Wife: Natalie Price (1999–2003); Janine Butcher (2003–2004)
- Sons: Jack Evans

Barry Evans is a fictional character from the BBC soap opera EastEnders, played by Shaun Williamson. He first appeared in episode 1072, originally shown in the United Kingdom on 27 December 1994, and made his last appearance in episode 2653, originally shown on 2 January 2004. The character is portrayed as a "buffoon".

== Creation and development ==
The character was originally intended to appear in four episodes, debuting in December 1994. According to Barry's actor Shaun Williamson, the character was originally conceived as a tall, blond haired man. Williamson was neither particularly tall nor blond, and after being called for an audition to read for the part, he thought about dropping out as he was not a physical match. However, the director stated that "nothing is laid in cement" with regard to the character, so Williamson went ahead with the audition. Williamson has said that Barry was meant to be a vehicle to bring his father Roy Evans (Tony Caunter) into the show, as Roy was being scripted as a new love interest for the regular character Pat Butcher (Pam St Clement); in Barry's first appearance he meets Pat to apologise for a dodgy car he had sold her, paving the way for Roy to be introduced to her. For the next year and a half, Barry made sporadic appearances, in Williamson's own words "popping in and out". When a storyline in 1996 saw Barry imprisoned for arson, Williamson has said that he was uncertain whether his character would appear again; however the character was brought back on a more permanent basis later in the year. After being released from prison, Barry aided Cindy Beale (Michelle Collins) in contacting a hitman to have her husband, Ian Beale, shot, after he discovers that she is having an affair. After Ian survives, Barry assists Cindy in fleeing the country with her children. In November, Barry becomes the owner of the car lot and employs Robbie, Lenny and Huw in the following year.

In 1999, executive-producer Matthew Robinson decided to introduce a new love-interest for Barry. He decided to bring back a former character, unrelated to Barry but who had connections with several other characters in the serial. The character was Natalie Price, played by Lucy Speed, who had appeared from 1994 to 1995. The biggest storyline involving Barry and Natalie in 1999 was their joint double wedding with the characters Ian Beale and Melanie Healy (Adam Woodyatt and Tamzin Outhwaite) - the lead up to which included a hen/stag night celebration episode, which was filmed on-location in Amsterdam, the Netherlands. The episode evoked criticism by the Broadcasting Standards Commission for its inclusion of “almost relentless drunken and promiscuous behaviour, sexual innuendo and drug-taking, before the watershed”, which included Natalie having to acquire three love bites from strangers. The BBC defended the episode, claiming that its content would have “come as no surprise to viewers” and adding that the depiction of this behaviour conformed to an EastEnders tradition - that questionable conduct "only leads to further trouble…One character's quest for drugs led to embarrassment and nausea and a drinking binge led to the calling off of [Barry and Natalie’s] wedding while the prospects for another became bleaker."

Natalie and Barry's screen wedding was featured as part of the Millennium Eve episodes, which drew in 20.89 million viewers – the biggest soap audience since the character Tiffany Mitchell (Martine McCutcheon) was killed off in EastEnders precisely one year earlier (New Year's Eve 1998). An EastEnders spokeswoman commented: "This is a remarkable endorsement of the power of EastEnders that over 20 million viewers chose to see the Millennium celebrations in Albert Square." The episodes were also broadcast on screens in London's Trafalgar Square, a typical “haunt for New Year's Eve revelers”.

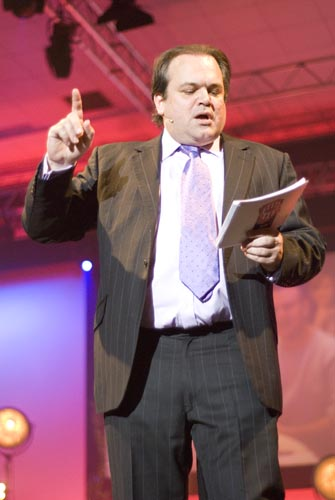
Shaun Williamson (pictured) portrayed Barry, who was killed off after Williamson agreed to star in a pantomime without alerting EastEnders producers.

In 2001, a pregnancy was written into the Evanses' narrative. Natalie was shown to be distressed by the prospect of being a mother and planned to have an abortion. Viewers saw a “devastated Barry” react badly to the news in a special extended four-hander episode (written by Christopher Reason and directed by Clive Arnold) – the episode had a maternal theme with the action flitting between Barry and Natalie's saga and scenes between Steve Owen and his dying mother, which included revelations of child abuse and incest. An EastEnders spokesman said: "We are very proud of the programme. The storylines involving Steve and his mother and Barry and Natalie are the stuff of intense drama. All four actors give incredible performances."The following episode Barry was seen to chase Natalie to the abortion clinic, where he persuaded her to go through with the pregnancy. The scenes between Natalie and Barry have been described as some of “the most powerful moments in soap, with the couple battling to decide the fate of their unborn baby”.

Viewers saw Natalie and Barry's marriage sour towards the end of 2002 when, in the New Year's Eve episode, Natalie rekindles a secret affair with her former lover Ricky Butcher (Sid Owen), which continued into 2003. Speed commented “Natalie's always had strong feelings for Ricky. And now she's grown tired of being a mother to baby Jack and Barry." The storyline reached its climax in March 2003. On-screen Natalie's plan to abscond with Ricky was thwarted by Barry's discovery of the affair, leading to a public confrontation between the three protagonists. Shaun Williamson has commented “Barry is absolutely devastated as his whole life is ripped apart. He can’t believe Nat has betrayed him. He loves his life with Natalie and Jack, and would do anything to make it work as a family again. Losing Natalie is going to be really difficult for Barry, but I think the hardest thing will be losing his son.” The storyline signified the end of the characters’ three-year marriage. Williamson left the serial after nine years in 2003 after agreeing to star in a seasonal pantomime without informing EastEnders producers, and the character was killed off.

It was announced on 15 November 2025 that Williamson had reprised the role of Barry for a special episode as part of Nigel Bates' (Paul Bradley) dementia storyline.

== Storylines ==
Barry arrives in Albert Square as an acquaintance of David Wicks (Michael French). He provides David and Cindy Beale (Michelle Collins), who are having an affair, somewhere to meet in secret. Barry later helps Cindy escape the UK when she is wanted by the police for the attempted murder of her husband, Ian Beale (Adam Woodyatt).

Barry is the son of car dealer Roy Evans (Tony Caunter). He moves to Albert Square when Roy and Pat Butcher (Pam St Clement) begin a relationship and move in together. Barry initially manages Roy's car business, Manor Wood, while Roy goes into partnership with Pat's son David by investing in his car lot in Walford. Problems arise when Pat's former husband Frank Butcher (Mike Reid) returns and tries to reclaim Pat, his house and his business (the car lot) from Roy. Barry tries to frighten Frank away by hiring a man to torch the car lot. When the arsonist is caught by the police, Barry is implicated and imprisoned. Upon his release, Barry is entrusted by Roy to run the car lot on Albert Square while he enjoys retirement: the business is renamed Evans & Son. Barry is forever searching for the respect and pride of his father, but more often than not he succeeds in disappointing Roy. He risks the business and his family's savings by handing monetary assets over to conwoman Vanessa Carlton. Barry is fooled into believing Vanessa wants a relationship with him and, after persuading him to invest the money in a fabricated business venture, she disappears, leaving Barry to face up to a furious Roy. Barry's blunder forces Roy out of retirement and Barry is never able to regain Roy's full trust again.

Losing his job at the car lot, Barry is forced to seek employment elsewhere and he uses malicious means to replace Robbie Jackson (Dean Gaffney) as manager of the local film rental shop. It is around this time that Barry seeks the help of a dating agency to find a girlfriend. This leads to him meeting Natalie Price (Lucy Speed), who runs Romantic Relations. The two grow closer as Natalie sets him up on several disastrous dates. After much bumbling from Barry, he eventually realises that he has feelings for Natalie and a romance begins. Natalie moves in with Barry, Roy and Pat and they marry in a millennium double wedding with Ian and Mel Healy (Tamzin Outhwaite). Barry and Natalie are happy for a while until Natalie discovers she is pregnant. Barry is overjoyed but Natalie is not and almost aborts the baby. However, Barry promises to help out with the baby duties so Natalie can keep working and in January 2002, their son Jack (Samuel and Joseph Timson) is born.

Barry has a turbulent time when his half-brother Nathan Williams (Doug Allen) comes onto the scene. Born out of an affair between Barry's father and Nathan's mother Jane Williams (Ann Mitchell), Nathan resents Barry for his closeness to Roy. Barry struggles to learn that his father had been unfaithful to his deceased mother and relations at the Evanses are strained. Despite attempts by Barry and Roy to make Nathan feel part of the family, Nathan does his best to exclude and diminish Barry. Things climax when Barry discovers Nathan has kissed his wife and, realising Nathan's agenda, Roy disowns him.

When Natalie grows weary of marriage to Barry, she begins an affair with her former lover Ricky Butcher (Sid Owen). Natalie and Ricky plan to leave Walford with their sons but Barry catches them. Barry attempts to change her mind but Natalie is adamant their marriage is over. However, she opts to leave Walford alone, having discovered that her trust in Ricky is misplaced. In the aftermath, Roy discovers Pat has been aware of Ricky and Natalie's affair and has not told Barry. Roy is incensed and dies from a heart attack, brought on during the resulting blazing row. Devastated, Barry blames his father's death on Pat for cheating on Roy with Frank, which depressed and angered Roy. During an argument with Pat, she tells him Natalie never loved him and Barry trashes the house. As Barry is the sole beneficiary of his father's estate, he throws Pat out and leaves her with nothing.

Barry spends a long time feeling sorry for himself and becomes reclusive. His employee Janine Butcher (Charlie Brooks), sensing an opportunity to make money, starts manipulating Barry. Helped by her secret boyfriend Paul Trueman (Gary Beadle), she concocts a plan to make Barry fall in love with her so she can get her hands on Barry's wealth. Feeling vulnerable since his split from Natalie, Barry falls for Janine and they get engaged. When a mix-up at Barry's doctor makes Barry believe that he only has a short time left to live, Janine believes she will inherit all his money and agrees to a rushed wedding in Scotland. They marry but Janine is mortified when Barry reveals he is not dying after all. Barry forces Janine to go for a walk on the Scottish Moors but, unable to stand being near Barry, Janine verbally abuses him. She confesses their relationship is a sham and that she has been having an affair with Paul. Barry still wants her and says that he will forgive her if she stays with him. He begs Janine not to leave him and goes to hug her but she pushes him away. Barry stumbles before falling over a cliff edge and hitting his head on a rock, dying shortly thereafter.

Janine has Barry cremated shortly after his death, and returns to Walford with his ashes. She also inherits all of his estate while Barry's son, Jack, inherits nothing. After Janine was arrested for Laura Beale (Hannah Waterman)'s murder, Natalie finds Barry's cremation urn and pours his ashes into a memorial tree for him in the Square Gardens.

Barry appears in episode 7246, broadcast on 23 December 2025, as part of Nigel's hallucation.

== Reception ==
In 2020, Sara Wallis and Ian Hyland from The Daily Mirror placed Barry 38th on their ranked list of the Best EastEnders characters of all time, calling him a "Total Mug" who "was duped by a conwoman, dumped by wife Natalie and fell for gold digger Janine, who left him to die after he fell off a cliff in 2004".

== In popular culture ==
In 2002 the character was featured in a spoof of the Michael Jackson hit video, Thriller, which was made as part of the annual fund-raising event, Children in Need. Shaun Williamson (as Barry) played the Michael Jackson role, while Lucy Speed (as Natalie) took on Ola Ray’s role as his date. The spoof saw Natalie transformed into a zombie, as Jackson was in the original video. Several cast members took part in the spoof where they recreated the dance routine made famous in the original video.

Following his stint on EastEnders, Shaun Williamson had a regular role as a comically unemployable version of himself in the Ricky Gervais and Stephen Merchant comedy series Extras, in which his career has bogged down partially as a result of the incompetence of his agent Darren Lamb (played by Merchant). A frequent running gag is that even Lamb is unable to remember his client's real name, instead referring to him as "Barry off EastEnders.". The character of Barry Evans has also been spoofed in the cartoon sketch show 2DTV.

On 20 January 2017, EastEnders actor Jake Wood and Channel 4 posted a satirical video showing "Barry" singing (Something Inside) So Strong at the inauguration of President Donald Trump on Twitter. The video actually shows Shaun Williamson performing at the 2014 World Indoor Bowls Championship in Great Yarmouth.

In March 2020, Jade Thirlwall, English singer and songwriter, and member of the British girl group Little Mix, appeared in a FaceTime interview on Capital FM's Breakfast Show, wearing a 'Barry' t-shirt.

British pro wrestler and Isle of Sheppey native Zack Sabre Jr. has used a submission move that he calls “Barry From EastEnders” as a finisher since his pro wrestling debut in 2004.
