= Barbara Emile =

British television producer

Barbara Emile is a British television producer. Emile contributed to the BBC soap opera EastEnders for several years. She first started working on the serial as script editor underneath producer Leonard Lewis, and she began producing the programme in 1992. Following the departure of Lewis in 1994, Emile was promoted to Executive Producer. Storylines that aired under her tenure included Sharongate, Nigel and Debbie Bates' wedding (an on-screen celebration that aired to mark the show's 1000th episode), and Ricky Butcher's love triangle with best friends Bianca Jackson and Natalie Price. Barbara cast actress Barbara Windsor as Peggy Mitchell. Innovating the writing talent, Emile introduced a pioneering structure to develop writing talent, led by Tony Jordan, Tony McHale, Ashley Pharaoh and Matthew Graham. In 1994 Emile took the programme from twice a week to three times per week. Under Emile's stewardship she led the series onto achieve ratings of 23 million viewers. Characters introduced included Tiffany Raymond, Roy and Barry Evans. She remained with EastEnders till early 1995 and was succeeded by Corinne Hollingworth.

Her producing credits have since included BBC drama series Madson (1996), which starred Ian McShane. It told the story of an ex-prisoner who was wrongly imprisoned for murder, who then tries to get legal revenge on the police who framed him. In 2007 she produced various episodes for the popular BBC medical drama Holby City for which she was awarded a BAFTA in 2008.

Working with Sir Lenny Henry, Barbara Emile is now the managing director and Creative Director of Douglas Road Productions.

Media offices
Preceded by Leonard Lewis	Executive Producer of EastEnders; 14 April 1994 – 28 February 1995	Succeeded by Corinne Hollingworth
