= Natalie Evans =

Fictional character from the BBC soap opera EastEnders

- EastEnders character
- Portrayed by: Lucy Speed
- Duration: 1994–1995, 1999–2004
- First appearance: Episode 936; 18 January 1994
- Last appearance: Episode 2726; 10 May 2004
- Introduced by: Leonard Lewis (1994); Matthew Robinson (1999)
In-universe information
- Other names: Natalie Price
- Occupation: Waitress; Dating agent; Advertising sales; Barmaid; Bookkeeper; Café manager
- Father: Dave Price
- Mother: Andrea Price
- Brothers: Jack Price; Kevin Price
- Sisters: Susie Price
- Husband: Barry Evans (1999–2003)
- Sons: Jack Evans
- Nephews: Darren

Natalie Evans (also Price) is a fictional character from the BBC soap opera EastEnders, played by Lucy Speed. Natalie first appeared on 18 January 1994, depicted initially as an unhappy, insecure teenager; she was among various regular characters brought in to increase the cast following the BBC's decision to increase episode output to three per week. She featured most often with the characters Ricky Butcher (Sid Owen) and Bianca Jackson (Patsy Palmer); Natalie's affair with Ricky ending his relationship with Bianca was one of the prominent storylines aired in the Winter of 1995. Despite producers offering to extend Speed's contract, she opted to leave the serial in 1995, and Natalie departed on 23 February of that year.

Executive producer Matthew Robinson reintroduced the character in 1999 as a businesswoman and a love interest for Barry Evans (Shaun Williamson). Storylines included a rocky marriage to Barry, contemplating abortion, almost sleeping with her brother-in-law, rekindling her affair with Ricky, a relationship with Paul Trueman (Gary Beadle) and desperately trying to get Janine Butcher (Charlie Brooks) arrested for murdering Barry. Her departure was announced in early 2004, and Natalie left on 10 May 2004.

== Creation and development ==
=== Casting ===
1994 was a 'historic' year for EastEnders, as in April that year, a third weekly episode was introduced. Due to the programme's increased frequency, a number of new characters were introduced to the regular cast in the latter part of 1993 and early 1994. Among them was Natalie Price, who made her first appearance in January 1994 as the best friend of Bianca (Patsy Palmer). The character was introduced under executive producer Leonard Lewis.

The actress Lucy Speed – seventeen at the time – was chosen to play the part. Speed claims that she was cast due to her "cranky" attitude during her audition. She comments, "I showed up there with an attitude, not giving 'a stuff' whether I got the damn part and they responded to that. They liked it, liked my feistiness, they thought it was the quality they were looking for...Natalie was a pretty gloomy kid, not a sunny show-biz kid which is all they'd been seeing until I walked through the door. So I got the part".

=== Personality ===
Natalie as she appeared in 1994

The character has been described by EastEnders author, Rupert Smith, as an "eternal victim" – a female character who endures much misfortune and misery, but lacks the "pluck" of her "feistier sisters". Early on in her narrative, Natalie was shown to be an insecure and lonely individual – a "gloomy kid" from a broken family with an uncaring, criticising and resentful mother, Andrea (Cindy O'Callaghan). The character was often seen to be "shunted aside by stronger personalities", such as her best friend Bianca – who was shown to bully and torment Natalie, telling her "that she was plain and wouldn't attract boys", although in later years Natalie stood up to Bianca's bullying.

Similarly, she was unsuccessful in relationships, falling for unsuitable men who ended up hurting her and settling in a "secure but uninspired" marriage to a mismatched, immature partner, Barry Evans. She was frequently shown to feel constrained and trapped by her marriage and motherhood, her initial reluctance to be a mother stemming from her own unhappy childhood. Though the character occasionally showed "a rare flash of spirit", the results were usually detrimental – an affair with her "first true love", Ricky Butcher (Sid Owen), ended the character's marriage and left her to face "a dreary future as a single mother". Lucy Speed has commented on her character's personality: "she's a thinker and quite vulnerable, but she's grown up a lot. She's also had storylines where she's dealt with family skeletons and she did find a man who was able to give her stability and the chance for her to grow up a bit. Ultimately though, I hope that I've shown that who she is now explains who she was then…she's gone from being a young girl with zero confidence in herself to a young woman with a certain measure of confidence, back to someone with zero confidence. Life doesn't go easy on her but she's got strength. She's a feisty little thing and she gets on with things".

=== Love triangle and initial departure ===
Initially, Natalie's principal purpose in the serial was to be Bianca Jackson's "put-upon sidekick"; Bianca was already an established character, having been introduced two months prior to Natalie's first appearance. The most notable storyline featuring Natalie during her initial stint in EastEnders was her affair with Bianca's boyfriend, Ricky. On-screen, Natalie and Ricky found themselves sidelined and bullied by Bianca, forcing them together and leading to their eventual affair, which continued for several weeks on-screen, with Ricky seeing both Natalie and Bianca. The storyline reached its climax on 16 Feb 1995; 17.0 million viewers tuned in to witness Bianca discovering that her boyfriend was sleeping with her best friend. The aftermath of the storyline led to Natalie's departure from the serial. On-screen, Ricky discovered that Natalie orchestrated Bianca's discovery of their affair and finished with her, and in the midst of Bianca's wrath, Natalie fled from Walford in shame on 23 February 1995.

Off-screen, actress Lucy Speed had decided to leave the serial after playing Natalie for a year, as she was reportedly "freaked out" by the media attention she was receiving from being in such a high-profile show. In an interview with the Walford Gazette, Speed commented: "I was very frightened by it quite frankly and certainly unprepared for it. I didn't like at all the attention that came with being on such a high-profile show. It simply wasn't what I signed up for in the first place-all that craziness. I was naive, I admit. Of course it does come with the job of being on the show and you have to learn to deal with it and cope with it. The advantages always outweigh the drawbacks, anyway, but it didn't seem like that to me at the time. I was very young and extremely shy, so it all became a huge difficulty for me…But I also have to make it clear that from the beginning when I joined, I always intended to stay in it for just a year anyway. I honoured my initial one-year contract and then moved on…they did express their interest in signing me for another year, but I politely but firmly declined. They were a bit shocked. I tried to explain in the best way I could my reasons for leaving at the end of my contract and they ultimately understood, and so I left on good terms with them…I had some growing up to do and instinctively knew that growing up more or less in front of the British public for one year was enough!"

=== Reintroduction and marriage to Barry Evans ===
After a four-year absence, Lucy Speed decided that she wanted to return to the series. She mentioned this to her former castmate Ross Kemp, who played Grant Mitchell in the serial and he initiated contact between Speed and then executive-producer, Matthew Robinson. Robinson had been thinking of introducing a new love-interest for the character Barry Evans (Shaun Williamson), and Robinson had already considered the possibility that the love interest could be Natalie. Speed has commented, "It was good timing. He thought I and the character fit the bill". Natalie made her reappearance on-screen on 8 March 1999 and a relationship between the two characters was developed. A friendship was also re-established between the characters Natalie and Bianca in a special four-hander episode – although "the closeness was never quite the same".

Natalie's relationship with Barry Evans- frequently described as a "bumbling buffoon" – was central to the character upon her return to the serial. Speed has explained her character's initial attraction to Barry: "I think it has a lot to do with her childhood. Natalie really adored her dad but he couldn't put up with that horrible wife of his, Andrea… and so he walked out on the family. Andrea is a total nightmare control freak, and it says a lot about who Natalie is, why she had no confidence in herself. Her mother probably emotionally abused her. So Barry represented safety and a secure family environment…She feels safe with him and she felt she made the right choice at the time, although of course she was apprehensive about it".

==== Millennium wedding ====
The biggest storyline involving Barry and Natalie in 1999 was their joint double wedding with the characters Ian Beale and Melanie Healy (Adam Woodyatt and Tamzin Outhwaite), the lead up to which included a hen/stag night celebration episode, which was filmed on-location in Amsterdam, the Netherlands. The episode evoked criticism by the Broadcasting Standards Commission for its inclusion of "almost relentless drunken and promiscuous behaviour, sexual innuendo and drug-taking, before the watershed", which included Natalie having to acquire three love bites from strangers. The BBC defended the episode, claiming that its content would have "come as no surprise to viewers" and adding that the depiction of this behaviour conformed to an EastEnders tradition: that questionable conduct "only leads to further trouble…One character's quest for drugs led to embarrassment and nausea and a drinking binge led to the calling off of [Barry and Natalie's] wedding while the prospects for another became bleaker."

Natalie and Barry's screen wedding was featured as part of the Millennium Eve episodes, which drew in 20.89 million viewers, the biggest soap audience since the character Tiffany Mitchell (Martine McCutcheon) was killed off in EastEnders precisely one year earlier (New Year's Eve 1998). An EastEnders spokeswoman commented: "This is a remarkable endorsement of the power of EastEnders that over 20 million viewers chose to see the Millennium celebrations in Albert Square." The episodes were also broadcast on screens in London's Trafalgar Square, a typical "haunt for New Year's Eve revellers".

==== Abortion ====
In 2001, a pregnancy was written into the character's narrative. Natalie was shown to be distressed by the prospect of being a mother and planned to have an abortion. Speed commented, "Natalie desperately wants a baby but the thought of becoming a mother makes her unhappy. Her family background is so awful she doesn't want to make the same mistake her mother made, but feels the odds are stacked against her and Barry." Viewers saw a "devastated Barry" react badly to the news, in a special extended four-hander episode (written by Christopher Reason and directed by Clive Arnold); the episode had a maternal theme, with the action flitting between Barry and Natalie's saga and scenes between Steve Owen (Martin Kemp) and his dying mother, which included revelations of child abuse and incest. An EastEnders spokesman said: "We are very proud of the programme. The storylines involving Steve and his mother and Barry and Natalie are the stuff of intense drama. All four actors give incredible performances."

The following episode Barry was seen to chase Natalie to the abortion clinic, where he persuaded her to go through with the pregnancy. The scenes between Natalie and Barry have been described as some of "the most powerful moments in soap, with the couple battling to decide the fate of their unborn baby". The character was seen to give birth to son Jack in January 2002, and her decision to keep her baby in spite of her initial determination to abort was mocked by Susannah Nightingale, a columnist for the Cambridge University Students' Union (CUSU) women's campaign. She sarcastically commented, "how lucky that she didn't go through with that patently psychotic urge for an abortion when she first realised she was pregnant […] It's funny, because Nat seemed so sure at the time: she wasn't ready for a baby, she needed to establish her career and move out of her husband's family home before becoming a mother. Perfectly reasonable, you might think […] but no! Our plucky hero Barry comes to her rescue, gently persuading her that she's just a little over-emotional and, phew – thank God he did, because here we are with a happy new family that might otherwise never have been. Dappy Natalie nearly screwed everything up. Men, even such sorry specimens as the perpetually pouting Barry, really are jolly decent to put up with these female follies and calmly guide their gals in the right direction".

Nightingale suggested that the storyline "echoed" the assertion that a woman cannot be trusted to make her own decision about abortion, which she describes as profoundly undermining and a "subtle" reinforcement of an "underlying implication" that women should be punished for exercising their legal right. She comments, "I am confused by the writers' unswerving insistence on her absolute certainty that abortion was the right choice for her, until the very last moment – such portrayals smack of her finally 'seeing the light'. Had the Natalie presented been a confused or uncertain woman, her change of heart would have seemed infinitely more credible, but she was neither. In fact, the very plausibility of the script was sacrificed, presumably to make a point – and the only one I can dig out is that of the dangers of going through with an abortion, even if you think you're sure – come on, what do you know?".

==== Adultery ====
Natalie and Barry's marriage sours towards the end of 2002, when she is momentarily tempted by the charms of his scheming half-brother Nathan (Doug Allen). In the New Year's Eve episode, she is shown to rekindle a secret "steamy affair" with old flame, Ricky, which continued into 2003. Speed commented "Natalie's always had strong feelings for Ricky. And now she's grown tired of being a mother to baby Jack and Barry!…family is everything to her, so she would have to feel very strongly indeed about someone to put her marriage at risk. As for Ricky, I suppose Natalie's always held a torch for him. He was her first love who finished with her, so she's been left with a kind of 'what if?' feeling. When Natalie was younger she was easily seduced, and a little bit of that remains. She can be easily swayed if someone is nice."

The storyline reached its climax in March 2003. On-screen the character's plans to abscond with Ricky and her son (on the night of her surprise birthday party) were thwarted by Barry's discovery of the affair – leading to a public confrontation between the three protagonists. Shaun Williamson who played Barry has commented "Barry is absolutely devastated as his whole life is ripped apart. He can't believe Nat has betrayed him. He loves his life with Natalie and Jack, and would do anything to make it work as a family again. Losing Natalie is going to be really difficult for Barry, but I think the hardest thing will be losing his son". The storyline signified the end of the characters' three-year marriage and in a final plot twist Natalie opts to finish with Ricky and leave Walford alone, having discovered that he has recently slept with his ex-wife, Sam.

=== Departure (2004) ===
The character's second exit was the climax to a storyline that has been described as one of the show's "most dramatic". Natalie's ex-husband Barry remarried and was killed by his new bride Janine Butcher (Charlie Brooks) on their honeymoon. The character is embroiled in a bid to uncover Janine as Barry's killer, and becomes romantically involved with the character Paul Trueman (Gary Beadle), Janine's repentant accomplice in Barry's downfall, who was also her former lover. After discovering the truth from Paul, Natalie realises she is powerless to bring Janine to justice, and decides to leave the Square in March 2004. The character returned briefly in May to ensure Janine received her comeuppance and made her final screen appearance on 10 May 2004.

Off-screen, actress Lucy Speed had decided to quit the role after six years playing Natalie. She comments "'I'd been back for five years and had very little to do the year before. I quite like being busy and I could see the scriptwriters were struggling with Natalie and where to place her so it seemed like the right time to go. It's nice that they've left it open, I'd hate to think the door was shut behind me. Absolutely, I'd like to go back, never say never. Maybe I'll track Janine down".

To mark the character's exit a special documentary was aired in March 2004, entitled EastEnders Revealed: Natalie Evans. The programme looked back over 10 years of the character's time in the soap and featured interviews from Speed and tributes from her former castmates Shaun Williamson (Barry), Charlie Brooks (Janine), Natalie Cassidy (Sonia Jackson), Gary Beadle (Paul), Pam St. Clement (Pat) and Tony Caunter (Roy).

== Storylines ==
=== Backstory ===
Natalie's parents separated early in her childhood and she took it badly. She lived with her mother Andrea (Cindy O'Callaghan) in Walford, but she had been closer to her father, Dave, and missed him terribly. Andrea favoured her other children, especially her older daughter Susie (Viva Duce), over Natalie. She was highly critical of Natalie and blamed her for the breakdown of her marriage (the unwanted pregnancy had ruined her figure and singing career, causing her husband to leave her). Andrea and Susie ridiculed Natalie for missing her father and wanting to keep in touch; Andrea claimed that Dave had no interest in Natalie.

At age 11 when she was in secondary school, Natalie met Bianca Jackson (Patsy Palmer). They became friends, but Bianca often sidelined her in favour of Tiffany Raymond (Martine McCutcheon), whom Bianca treated with more respect than Natalie. In fact, Tiffany joined Bianca in teasing Natalie. Natalie resented Tiffany and was pleased when she moved away after leaving school at 16 in 1993.

=== 1994–1995 ===
Mischievous Natalie often entices Bianca into trouble, but Bianca is more domineering, often putting Natalie down. Lonely, Natalie makes up an imaginary boyfriend for attention, claiming he has taken her on extravagant dates. This makes Bianca envious initially, but when Natalie's lies are discovered, Bianca takes great pleasure in humiliating her.

When Tiffany reappears, Natalie feels side-lined by Bianca as she did in school. Bianca's boyfriend Ricky Butcher (Sid Owen) also tires of Bianca's selfishness and this inadvertently drives him and Natalie closer together. They console each other and in February 1995, they begin an affair. Ricky is Natalie's first sexual partner and for her it is true love, but Ricky does not take it as seriously. Natalie starts pressuring Ricky to tell Bianca about their relationship and when he does not, Natalie plants some lingerie in his work overalls. Bianca finds it and suspects Ricky is having an affair; she takes Natalie's advice to follow Ricky so she can catch him with the mystery woman. Bianca does this one night, catches them kissing and is incensed. In the aftermath, Ricky dumps Natalie and Bianca threatens her, ordering her to leave Walford. Dejected, Natalie does so, leaving Walford to stay with her sister in Basingstoke.

=== 1999–2004 ===
In 1999, Natalie reappears as a new self-confident business woman, running a dating agency. Barry Evans (Shaun Williamson), unaware of Natalie's history, uses her agency, "Romantic Relations". Despite Natalie's attempts to set Barry up with other female hopefuls, she eventually becomes attracted to him herself and they begin dating. Natalie's reappearance is met unfavourably by Bianca and fights ensue. However, they eventually call a truce and become friends again. Natalie's business does not prosper and closes soon after.

Barry and Natalie marry (1999)

Despite initial problems caused by Natalie's overbearing mother who tries to take over the wedding plans, Natalie and Barry marry on New Year's Eve in 1999, in a joint wedding with Ian Beale (Adam Woodyatt) and Mel Healy (Tamzin Outhwaite). They live with Barry's father Roy Evans (Tony Caunter) and stepmother Pat Evans (Pam St. Clement) and are relatively happy until Natalie becomes pregnant. Preferring to concentrate on her career, and unable to make Barry realise how she feels, Natalie plans an abortion. When Barry comes to the clinic, pledging to support her decision, Natalie changes her mind and does not have the termination. Barry is overjoyed and agrees to give up work and look after the baby so she can work, giving birth to son Jack (Samuel and Joseph Timson) early in 2002 — the birth is traumatic, as Jack is born feet first. Motherhood is hard for Natalie; she begins to feel that she has two children, Jack and Barry. When Barry's half-brother, Nathan Williams (Doug Allen), moves in briefly, he makes Natalie an unsuspecting pawn in his vendetta. Determined to ruin Barry, Nathan tries to seduce Natalie and they kiss briefly, but she soon realises that Nathan wants to ruin Barry and banishes him from their lives. Barry forgives Natalie; their marriage remains intact but Natalie grows increasingly unhappy with Barry's immaturity.

Feeling stifled and trapped, she turns to Ricky. They rekindle their affair and decide to leave Albert Square with their sons. On the night of her 26th birthday, while Barry plans a secret party in The Queen Victoria public house, Natalie prepares to leave. Barry discovers what is happening just as Natalie is leaving. Desperate to prove his love, he drags Natalie into the pub and begs her to stay. Natalie breaks Barry's heart by admitting that she does not love him and despite his pleading, refuses to give their marriage another chance. During the chaos, Ricky's sister, Janine Butcher (Charlie Brooks) ruins their plans by telling Natalie about Ricky's one-night stand with Sam Mitchell (Kim Medcalf) days before. Confronted by Barry but unable to trust Ricky and racked with guilt, Natalie ends things with Ricky and leaves Walford alone, later divorcing Barry. When Roy dies from a heart attack the following day, Natalie later returns to his funeral and decides to stay in Walford for a while. Janine encourages the divorce and sets a plan in motion to manipulate Barry and steal his money, aided by Janine's true boyfriend, Paul Trueman (Gary Beadle). This eventually leads to Barry's untimely demise, when Janine pushes him from a cliff and leaves him to die, the day after they marry on New Year's Eve 2003 in Scotland. Janine inherits Barry's wealth, leaving Natalie and Jack with nothing.

Suspecting foul play, Natalie tries to prove Janine has murdered Barry but is unsuccessful. She refuses to leave with Ricky, who leaves following Janine's confession of what really happened to Barry (but who keeps this to himself). While Natalie comes to terms with Barry's death, she gets close to Paul, who is desperate to make amends to Natalie and Jack for his part in Barry's death. Despite his feelings for Natalie, Paul struggles with his guilt and when Natalie gets suspicious about Paul's relationship with Janine, he finally reveals Janine's role in Barry's death and makes a statement to the police. Janine is questioned but released due to lack of evidence; she promptly tells Natalie that Paul conspired with her from the start and gloats about getting away with murder. Devastated, and unable to prove Janine's guilt to the police, Natalie leaves Paul and Albert Square in March 2004. She returns briefly in May to witness Janine's incarceration after she is falsely accused of murdering Laura Beale (Hannah Waterman). Natalie makes peace with Paul, holding a ceremony for Barry by scattering his ashes under a tree planted in his memory. She and Jack leave, but it is indicated that Pat stays in touch with Natalie when she goes to stay with her off-screen in 2007, following an accident.

== Reception ==
In 1995, Chris Barker carried out television research on post-transmission perspectives of teenage viewers of EastEnders, using the character Natalie as one of the focus points. He discovered that the participants were both active and implicit in the reproduction of ideology about family relationships and gender, identified via discussion of the friendship between Bianca and Natalie. Girls viewed Natalie more favourably than Bianca in 1995, and the author noted that tensions in "girl-culture" – attraction to the traditional private world of interpersonal relationships and the desire to take up more assertive characteristics in public – manifested themselves in discussions about Bianca and her friend Natalie Price. Natalie was constructed as a "nice person" in contrast to Bianca, "[Natalie] can relate to Ricky [...] cares for other people and doesn't just think about herself [like Bianca does]", qualities that were said to be constitutive of the traditional identity of women.

Linda Ruth Williams, author of The erotic thriller in contemporary cinema, was critical of a scene featuring Natalie speaking in a derogatory manner about the erotic thriller film genre. In an episode that aired in 2000, Natalie's husband Barry suggested that he and Natalie get intimate in a video store. Natalie retorted that "pinning me up against the erotic thriller section" was not her idea of a romantic setting for sex. Ruth Williams suggested that Natalie's casual dismissal of the erotic thriller genre as "lurid" was a discourse shared by the general population; she stated that witnessing this scene inspired her to pen the aforementioned book, which was the first of its kind to examine the film genre.

Natalie Evans peaked at 52 on EastEnders: The Greatest Cliffhangers in 2010.

== In popular culture ==
In 2002 the character was featured in a spoof of the Michael Jackson hit video, Thriller, which was made as part of the annual fund-raising event, Children in Need. Shaun Williamson as Barry played the Michael Jackson role, while Lucy Speed as Natalie took on Ola Ray's role as his date. Unlike the original video – where Jackson was seen to turn into a zombie – the spoof saw Natalie transformed into the walking dead. A dozen cast-members took part in the spoof where they recreated the dance routine made famous in the original video. Speed has commented "I really enjoyed that. We were there on our day off but it was brilliant fun. I used to be a dancer and to be able to do some moves on the Square was good. We all wanted to look as horrific and disgusting as possible. Shaun split his trousers while doing it as well. I think they were really tight though".
