= Roy Evans (EastEnders) =

Fictional character from EastEnders

- EastEnders character
- Portrayed by: Tony Caunter
- Duration: 1994–2003
- First appearance: Episode 1071; 26 December 1994
- Last appearance: Episode 2483; 17 March 2003
- Introduced by: Barbara Emile
In-universe information
- Occupation: Car salesman
- Wife: Doreen Evans (backstory); Pat Butcher (1996–2003)
- Sons: Barry Evans; Nathan Williams
- Grandsons: Jack Evans

Roy Evans is a fictional character from the BBC soap opera EastEnders, played by Tony Caunter from 26 December 1994 to 18 March 2003. Introduced by executive producer Barbara Emile in 1994, Roy is scripted as a love interest for Pat Butcher (Pam St Clement). Caunter remained a regular character until new executive producer Louise Berridge axed him in 2003, a decision which she later stated she regretted.

== Creation and development ==
Roy was one of the introductions of series producer Barbara Emile in 1994. He was introduced primarily to be a love interest to Pat Butcher (Pam St Clement). Actor Brian Croucher was shortlisted for the role; however, the production decided they did not want to use him for the part of Roy, and as Caunter and Croucher shared the same agent, Caunter was suggested for the part and was successful. Croucher was later cast as Ted Hills.

Scripted as a successful businessman, Roy moved to the soap's setting of Walford in 1995. Caunter commented to fan magazine, Walford Gazette: "I think there was that concern in the beginning [about reasons why a wealthy man like Roy would move to Walford] but the writers created a plausible reason for him to move into the Square. He's from that environment initially; he's an East End boy. He's not a posh gent although he does know about good wine and fine dining. He really loves Pat and she didn't want to leave because her family and friends were there and by then he'd have done anything for Pat. He'd reached a time in his life when he desperately wanted a good home life with a good woman. He was already semi-retired and could afford to sit back and smell the roses, so to speak – and he wanted to smell them with Pat!"

A notable storyline in Roy's narrative is his disclosure to Pat that he is impotent. Caunter believes the writers made Roy impotent because they were concerned about Pat having sex with someone so soon after her husband Frank absconded. The dangers of viagra were explored in the storyline, when Roy, after suffering from angina, illegally buys the drug and suffers life-threatening repercussions, which leads to him attempting counselling instead.

In 2002, it was announced that Roy was being written out of the soap. Caunter said playing Roy had been "the happiest period of my career. We felt we'd done enough with Roy, and it was time for me to move on. I will miss working alongside my screen family and all the team at EastEnders, but I look forward to trying out some new roles." Executive producer Louise Berridge said, "The character of Roy has been invaluable to us. He provides a centre of stability it will be hard to replace, and represents a sense of values we must make sure we retain. I agree that it's time for the character to move on, but we will all miss Tony very much. Apart from being always the consummate professional, he is also a really lovely man, and we all wish him every success in whatever he turns his hand to next." In 2003, it was reported that Roy would depart the serial by being killed off. A source told the Daily Mirror, "He decided to leave the show but wanted scriptwriters to leave the door open for his character to return for guest spots. Sadly, the producers have closed that door by killing him off. Tony is disappointed by the way he'll be leaving Albert Square. He's a popular character and viewers will be sad to see him go." Roy suffered a fatal heart attack following the breakdown of his son Barry's (Shaun Williamson) marriage to Natalie (Lucy Speed), making his final appearance in March 2003.

In 2010, in an interview with website Walford Web, Berridge reflected on Roy's axing, saying that she did regret it in retrospect: "[Roy's] personality didn't generate story material, but in his case he was also beginning to stifle Pat. John Yorke and I share a great passion for the old, wild dangerous Pat who wore the white mac and looked as if she chewed up broken bottles for breakfast, but the Pat we had [at that time] had become too safe and comfortable. She'd had her affair story with Frank – and since he was and is the love of her life, if she didn't leave [Roy] for Frank she wasn't going to do it for anyone else. To galvanise Pat we had to lose Roy. But I wish now we'd found some other way. Roy had a stability about him that we needed, and losing both him and Mark Fowler (Todd Carty) within a year left us a kind of moral hole in the centre of the show. Those older 'good' characters have a role that extends far beyond the immediate gratification of story – as Lou Beale did in the past."

== Storylines ==
Roy Evans arrives in Albert Square at the end of 1994. He is joined by his son Barry Evans (Shaun Williamson), and it transpires that the pair run a successful car-dealing business who are planning to secure a partnership with Barry's business associate David Wicks (Michael French). While undertaking business arrangements, Roy meets and is instantly attracted to David's mother Pat Butcher (Pam St Clement). Recently separated from her former husband Frank (Mike Reid), who has mysteriously disappeared, Pat is unwilling to begin a new romance with Roy. However, David senses that it may benefit a favorable outcome between their businesses and encourages the relationship to continue; Roy and Pat soon fall in love with each other and move in together. The relationship suffers a setback when it is revealed that Roy is unable to consummate his love for Pat because he has been impotent for many years. Although Pat is understanding, Roy nevertheless feels emasculated. Eventually they both agree that love and companionship are more important than sex. Pat and Roy's relationship blossoms until the reappearance, on Christmas Day 1995, of Frank – who has come home to claim his business and his wife. Roy soon clashes with Frank over the ownership of the car lot and Pat, with whom Frank attempts to reconcile by continuously pleading with her to give their marriage another chance. Despite Frank stirring up buried feelings in Pat to the point of seducing her in a secret one-night stand between them, she ends up divorcing him and marries Roy in November 1996.

After David flees Walford, Roy buys his share in the car lot and renames it Evans & Son. Preferring to take a back seat, he leaves the running of the business to Barry. Unfortunately for him, Barry is not up to the job; after grifter Vanessa Carlton steals Roy's hard-earned fortune, he is forced to sell his other business (Manor Wood) and come out of retirement. Roy's health suffers because of this, and he gives his family a scare when he is rushed to hospital after suffering a heart attack. With bailiffs knocking on his door, and with Roy unfit to work, Pat turns to Frank to bail them out. At first Roy is unwilling to accept Frank's help, but he eventually relents at Pat's urging. However, he continues to remain apprehensive towards Frank over the assumptions that Frank would try to win Pat over. In October 1998, when Roy suspects Pat and Frank are having a tryst behind his back after Barry informs him of their recent closeness behind his back, he becomes suicidal and flees Walford in his vehicle. Roy then threatens to throw himself off a multi-storey car park. However, Frank stops him persuades Roy to rethink over his decision. The two men manage to put their differences aside, subsequent to which Roy and Pat develop a strong friendship with both Frank and his love interest Peggy Mitchell (Barbara Windsor). Soon enough Frank becomes a 'silent' partner in the car lot, providing the much needed cash while Roy deals with the running of the business.

Despite suffering with angina, Roy's torment over his inability to perform sexually prompts him to illegally buy Viagra. However, after suffering serious side effects that almost kill him, he eventually turns to counselling to fix the problem. During the sessions, it is revealed that his impotence occurred straight after the death of his first wife and Barry's late mother Doreen; she died from complications while giving birth to his daughter (who also died shortly after her birth), more than 20 years earlier. Roy later reveals that he was in bed with another woman at the time and he was never able to forgive himself.

By the start of 2000 following the Millennium Celebrations, Roy is still undergoing a potential financial crisis. Desperate to give Pat a more luxurious lifestyle, he gets himself involved in a car scam operated by Peggy's criminal son and local mechanic Phil Mitchell (Steve McFadden). The usually honest Roy agrees to sell stolen, re-conditioned cars for large sums of money. However, it is not long before Frank's daughter Janine (Charlie Brooks) discovers this and informs Peggy about it; Peggy reacts furiously to the discovery and is even more annoyed when she discovers Frank is not receiving a share of the money. Roy is eventually forced to stop the scam and the cars are all sold off at a loss. Peggy agrees to keep Frank and Pat in the dark, but the scam resumes when Peggy becomes desperate in need of money to buy off Phil's arch-nemesis Dan Sullivan (Craig Fairbrass) from his co-ownership of her family pub - The Queen Victoria public house.

Once the scam has started again, however, Frank finds out about it upon arriving back in the square and he too becomes heavily involved. But then Janine maliciously informs Dan about the scam and he in turn reports them to the police. Dan quickly informs Peggy that the police are on the way, claiming that he overheard a punter reporting the scam. Pat, Peggy and Dan manage to remove the cars before the police arrive and they avoid arrest. However, with a furious Pat now knowing about her husband's dishonesty, she goes behind his back, sells his cars for scrap and gives the money to charity. Peggy and Frank are then unable to pay Dan, while Pat throws Roy out of their marital home. Pat feels that she cannot trust Roy any longer and begins contemplating divorce. Roy spends his time drinking heavily, sleeping in the office of the car lot and threatening to turn himself in to the police. Eventually, when Roy attempts to move out permanently, Pat relents and allows him to stay, but tells him that it will take a long time to earn her trust again. After many weeks sleeping on the sofa, Pat finally makes up with Roy and he, along with Phil and Frank, eventually retaliate on Dan by conning him to sign back his share of The Queen Vic.

Roy faces more marital problems that year when he and Pat are on a joint holiday in Spain with Frank and Peggy. Behind Roy's back, Frank seduces Pat and they end up in bed before continuing their affair back in Walford. Soon Frank and Pat plan to elope, only for Pat to change her mind at the last minute and call the relationship off. But it is too late, as Frank has already left a goodbye note telling Peggy he still loves Pat and is leaving her. This culminates in a huge showdown in The Queen Vic, where Peggy tells the punters what Frank and Pat have planned. Roy is initially willing to forgive Pat, but Barry then alerts him to a suitcase containing massage oil, fishnet stockings and a red Basque, which Pat had been planning to take with her when she ran away with Frank. Roy is furious and evicts Pat. However, he forgives her three months later, when she heads to the airport to leave Walford and move to New Zealand to be with her son Simon. Despite objections from Barry, she moves back in with Roy soon after. The dynamics of the relationship change completely after this, with Roy being very much in charge.

Later in 2001, Jane Williams (Ann Mitchell), the woman Roy had been having an affair with at the time of his wife's death, arrives in Walford, terminally ill. She has contacted Roy because she wants to tell him that he is the father of her son, Nathan Williams (Doug Allen), who is by now well into his twenties. The news upsets the balance in the Evans household, and his relationship with Barry severely suffers as he is devastated to learn that his father was unfaithful to his dead mother, as well as the revelation that he had a brother he knew nothing about. Jane dies in January 2002, leaving Nathan penniless and bankrupt. With nowhere to go, Nathan turns to Roy and soon moves in with the Evanses. The pair bond until it is revealed that Nathan has attempted to seduce Barry's wife Natalie (Lucy Speed) and set him up for the theft of money from the car lot. An angry Roy banishes Nathan from their lives and tells him he never wants to see him again. In March 2003, stress finally gets the better of Roy when he discovers Pat is helping Natalie hide her affair with Frank's son, Ricky (Sid Owen). An argument erupts between Roy and Pat when he feels that she has chosen Frank over him because she helped Frank's offspring over his own. This leads to Roy's second heart attack. Roy later dies in hospital, leaving Pat bereft and homeless after Barry kicks her out after becoming the sole beneficiary of Roy's unchanged will.
