= Al Murray's Great British Pub Quiz =

- Genre: Game show
- Written by: Al Murray
- Directed by: Paul Wheeler
- Presented by: Al Murray
- Starring: Shaun Williamson
- Country of origin: United Kingdom
- Original language: English
- No. of series: 1
- No. of episodes: 20

Production
- Producers: Luke Shiach; Dan Wickens
- Running time: 60 minutes

Original release
- Network: Quest
- Release: 7 March – 1 September 2019

Al Murray's Great British Pub Quiz is a British television game show first broadcast on 7 March 2019. In each episode two teams comprising three members from a pub in the United Kingdom compete in a pub quiz. The show is presented by Al Murray with Shaun Williamson as the barman, who assists the host and keeps the score.
