= Debbie Bates =

Fictional character from EastEnders

- EastEnders character
- Portrayed by: Nicola Duffett (1993–1995, 2025); Uncredited (2025)
- Duration: 1993–1995, 2025
- First appearance: Episode 867; 25 May 1993
- Last appearance: Episode 7246; 23 December 2025
- Introduced by: Leonard Lewis (1993); Ben Wadey (2025)
In-universe information
- Occupation: Bookmaker cashier
- Mother: Maxine Palmer
- Husband: Liam Tyler (until 1993); Nigel Bates (1994–1995)
- Daughters: Clare Bates
- Granddaughters: Bella

Debbie Bates (also Tyler) is a fictional character from the BBC soap opera EastEnders, played by Nicola Duffett from 1993 to 1995. She was introduced as a love interest for Nigel Bates (Paul Bradley), but was killed-off in 1995 at Duffett's request. She returned in both May and December 2025 as a cameo in a vision within Nigel Bates' mind as part of his dementia storyline, with Duffett reprising the role for Debbie’s final appearance.

== Creation and development ==
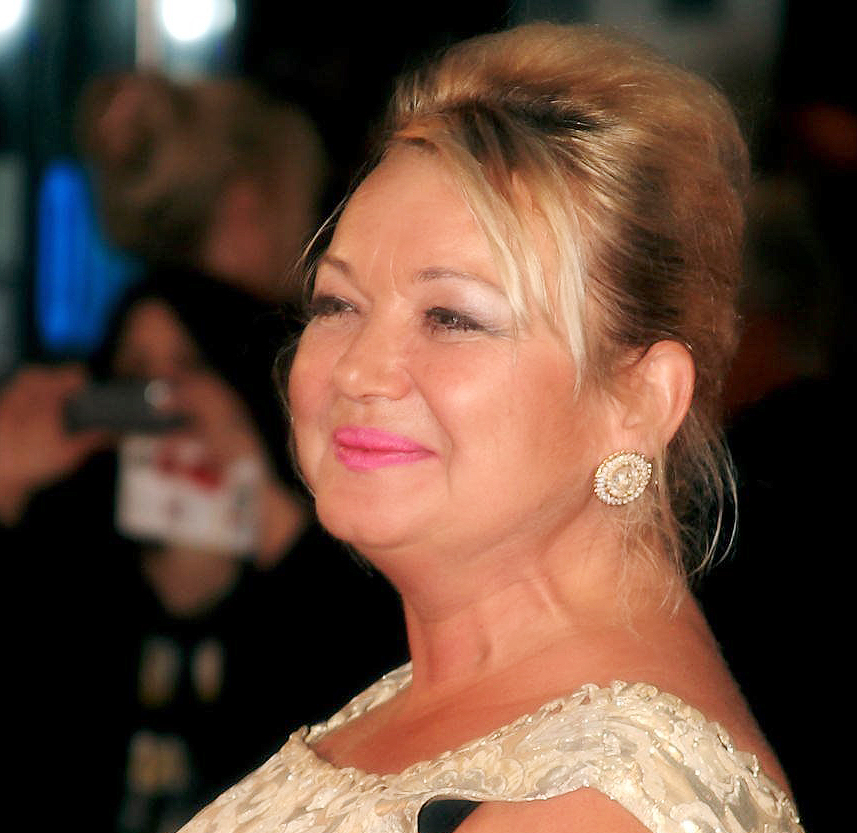
Nicola Duffett (pictured) got bored of playing Debbie so asked producers to kill her character off.

Debbie was introduced in 1993 by executive producer Leonard Lewis as a love-interest for Nigel Bates (Paul Bradley). Debbie's actress Duffett has described Debbie as "nice, unassuming and shy", which she claims was in stark contrast to her own personality. Debbie's introduction storyline stemmed around a storyline focusing on spousal abuse, when it was revealed that Debbie was being abused by her estranged husband Liam Tyler (Francis Magee). Nigel and Debbie's eventual marriage was the focus of EastEnders' celebratory episode on 12 July 1994, which marked the show's 1000th episode. EastEnders' writer Colin Brake has selected it as 1994's episode of the year. Off-screen the show's Series Producer Barbara Emile decided to mark the 1000th episode with a celebration and the wedding of Nigel and Debbie was chosen as the event. It was scripted to be a happy occasion in the soap, with Debbie and Nigel's ceremony going ahead despite threats of intrusion from Liam.

Duffett grew weary of playing Debbie saying she became too boring and drippy, and asked the producers of EastEnders to kill her character off in 1995, which they did; Debbie was killed in a hit-and-run motor accident. Duffett has commented, "I left EastEnders of my own accord, without a shadow of a doubt. I begged to be killed. I ran to the script editor's office. Every time I see him at a party he says, 'I'll never forget you.' Because I ran in crying, 'Kill me NOW! I can't stand it.' Because the part was so boring. I played this simpering wimp, Debbie. All I did was walk into the Vic and say, 'Where's Nigel?'" Duffett has stated that she has no regrets about leaving the role, and that she wanted her character killed so she had no opportunity to ever return as she worried about being typecast.

== Storylines ==
Debbie first appears in Walford in May 1993 as a friend of Tracey (Jane Slaughter), attending Tracey's hen party. She becomes a love interest for Nigel Bates (Paul Bradley), when she meets him at his birthday party. Debbie and her daughter, Clare Bates (Gemma Bissix), move nearby to escape Debbie's ex-husband Liam Tyler (Francis Magee), who has been abusing her. Liam eventually tracks Debbie down and makes several attempts to break up Nigel and Debbie but is unsuccessful, and Debbie and Clare both move to Walford to live with Nigel.

In July 1994, Debbie marries Nigel and they are content in marriage. She starts working at the local bookmakers but her boss, Stan Dougan (Jack Chissick), constantly tries to flirt with her, which she dislikes. She keeps this a secret from Nigel but when Stan makes a move on her she quickly rejects him and quits her job. Nigel is suspicious of Debbie suddenly quitting but eventually finds out Stan has been harassing her, so he punches Stan.

Tragedy strikes soon after when Debbie is killed in a hit-and-run accident in June 1995. Police tell Nigel that she walked out into a road and someone hit her at speed, killing her instantly. Debbie's death devastates Nigel and Clare. Nigel goes on to adopt Clare after Liam returns and is unsuccessful in his attempt to gain custody of her. On the 13th anniversary of Debbie's death in 2008, Clare and Dot Branning (June Brown) visit her grave.

In both May and December 2025 Debbie is reintroduced as part of Nigel's dementia storyline. She enters as visionary cameo in Nigel's mind.
