= Lucy Speed =

British actress

- Born: 31 August 1976 (age 50); Croydon, London, England
- Education: Italia Conti Academy of Theatre Arts
- Occupation: Actress
- Years active: 1983–present
- Known for: EastEnders
- Spouse: Spencer Hayler (m. 2009)
- Children: 2

Lucy Renee Speed (born 31 August 1976) is an English actress best known for her television roles as Natalie Evans in the BBC One soap opera EastEnders appearing in 526 episodes between 1994 and 2004, and as DS Stevie Moss in the ITV police drama series The Bill from 2008 to 2010. She has also starred in the BBC One sitcom Cradle to Grave (2015) and ITV dramas Marcella (2018) and Unforgotten (2021). Speed is also a prolific stage performer, appearing in numerous theatrical productions.

== Early life ==
Speed is the second of two children born to Sue (née Salter) and Sid Speed, having an older brother, Dan. Her career in performing began at the age of seven after her ballet teacher saw potential and advised her parents to get her an agent. She attended a local after-school theatre group in south Croydon alongside actor Nigel Harman, who she would later work with in EastEnders. Speed spent two terms at the Italia Conti Academy of Theatre Arts.

== Career ==
=== Early career ===
At the age of seven, Speed modelled clothes for Kays catalogue and she went on to appear in commercials for Sunpat peanut butter, then for gas, paint, soup and the children's toy My Little Pony. By the age of eight she was acting on stage at London's National Theatre in Neap Tide, a controversial play about lesbianism and women's oppression. Speed has commented "Mum wasn't keen for me to be a child actress — she thought I'd be even more precocious than I already was… I worked constantly and I loved it."

Speed appeared in several films during her youth, which included playing the role of Josephine Stitch in the 1987 film Scoop when she was eleven. She went on to secure the role of 'young Aurora' in the film Impromptu (1991), which was about Polish pianist Frédéric Chopin and starred Hugh Grant.

Speed made an early appearance on television when she filmed at Windsor Safari Park with television presenter Johnny Morris. She went on to have roles in legal drama Rumpole of the Bailey (as Isolde Erskine-Brown) in 1987, and later appeared in an episode of Saracen in 1989. In 1991 she starred in the award-winning Dodgem alongside actor Sean Maguire. Dodgem was a six-part televised drama for children's BBC, written and adapted by Bernard Ashley. Speed played Rose Penfold, a streetwise love interest for Maguire's character, Simon; they meet at a children's home and then run away to be together.

During 1992–93 Speed appeared as Beki Jenner in two series of Rides, a BBC drama about an all-woman minicab firm, written by Carole Hayman. She later appeared in an episode of the BBC children's programme Parallel 9, which aired in 1994.

=== EastEnders ===
Speed's big television break came in 1993 aged 17, when she won the part of Natalie Price in the BBC soap EastEnders. She played the brow beaten best friend of Bianca Jackson (played by Patsy Palmer), making her first appearance on-screen in January 1994. Speed quit the soap after a year as she felt overwhelmed and unprepared by all the press attention she received from being in such a high-profile show. Speed commented: "I was very frightened by it quite frankly and certainly unprepared for it. I didn't like at all the attention that came with being on such a high-profile show. It simply wasn't what I signed up for in the first place---all that craziness. I was very young and extremely shy, so it all became a huge difficulty for me…I honoured my initial one-year contract and then moved on…they did express their interest in signing me for another year, but I politely but firmly declined. They were a bit shocked. I tried to explain in the best way I could my reasons for leaving at the end of my contract and they ultimately understood, and so I left on good terms with them…I had some growing up to do and instinctively knew that growing up more or less in front of the British public for one year was enough!"

However, in 1999 Speed reprised the role of Natalie Price, four years after her initial departure. Her return was prompted by her friend and EastEnders co-star Ross Kemp, who initiated contact between her and producer Matthew Robinson. Speed commented "I have changed. I've grown up and I'm more confident. I've had more life experiences. I've had bad times, lived in different places. I'm a bit more grown up and settled now. And as I've grown older I appreciate that it's much nicer to have a regular job. When EastEnders asked me back, I thought, `Cool, I can pay the mortgage."

Speed decided to leave the soap once again in 2004. She commented "I'd been back for five years and had very little to do the year before. I quite like being busy and I could see the scriptwriters were struggling with Natalie and where to place her so it seemed like the right time to go. It's nice that they've left it open, I'd hate to think the door was shut behind me. Absolutely, I'd like to go back, never say never.”

=== Other roles ===
In 1995 Speed played Nell Gwyn in England, My England, a film about the composer Henry Purcell. She made minor appearances in the films Metroland (1997), Keep the Aspidistra Flying (1997), and the Academy Award-winning film Shakespeare in Love (1998).

Her television work includes roles in BBC drama Dangerfield, BBC comedy Men Behaving Badly, An Unsuitable Job for a Woman, hospital drama Casualty and The New Adventures of Robin Hood, which was shot in Lithuania. She also worked on a television series in America called Unsolved Mysteries. She appeared in the BBC hospital drama Holby City in 2004, the Detective series Jericho in 2005, and in 2007 she filmed for the second series of the BBC comedy Love Soup. Speed later appeared in The Bill as DC/DS Stevie Moss from series 24 in 2008 until the final episode in August 2010.

Away from acting, Speed has appeared in television game shows. These include Celebrity Ready, Steady, Cook, and Celebrity Weakest Link hosted by Anne Robinson, and Pointless Celebrities partnering her former on-screen EastEnders husband, Shaun Williamson. In 2007, Speed fronted the first self-protection instructional DVD, entitled "Stay Safe With Lucy Speed". The DVD features special forces and "martial arts guru" Andy Hopwood, and teaches various self-defence techniques.

=== Stage and radio ===
Speed has appeared in stage and radio plays. In 2000 she starred in Be My Baby at London's Soho Theatre, playing a four-month pregnant singer called Queenie. In 2004 she toured with the Vagina Monologues and in 2006 she starred in the Louise Roche play/musical Girls' Night, which toured the UK. The comedy play follows five friends as they relive their past at a karaoke night. In 2007 Speed was one of several former soap stars to act in the stage play Soap at the Royal Theatre, which was a parody of TV soap operas written by Sarah Wood. The play also starred Coronation Street's Paul Fox, Emmerdale's Janice McKenzie and EastEnders' Marc Bannerman. In 2003 she performed in the Radio 4 series Elephants to Catch Eels, with former Coronation Street star John Bowe, and she played the part of Silver in the radio play, Speed and Silver.

In 2017, Speed appeared in Stephen Unwin's All Our Children, which premiered at the Jermyn Street Theatre. Speed portrayed the mother of a disabled son in Nazi Germany. About the role, Speed told the Evening Standard: "I’ve always been interested in history, but when I was a child I did a play called Rosie Blitz at the Polka Theatre where I played a refugee and it was a really lovely play and all-consuming [...] I just felt the emotional connections and then I kept returning to reading about the home front and Germany and Russia — and when you start reading about the subject you just learn more and more [...] I met Stephen and spoke with him and I know about his history with it, and I just thought when it comes from such an honest place I wanted to be involved. I wanted to represent a lot of those parents I knew, and this is the same reason I would say people should come and see it."

Speed joined radio soap opera The Archers as Home Farm manager Stella Pryor in 2021. She was part of the show's first on-air lesbian kiss in August 2023.

In March 2022, Speed performed as Ada Jarvis in Mark Ravenhill's version of Blackmail. Chris Wiegand, reviewing for The Guardian, rated the play 3/5 stars. Dave Fargnoli, for The Stage, rated Blackmail 4/5 stars.

In January 2023, Speed starred as Truvy in a production of Steel Magnolias at the Richmond Theatre, London. Speed appeared alongside Laura Main, Diana Vickers, Caroline Harker and Elizabeth Ayodele. The production, going on to tour the UK, was rated 2/5 stars by What's on Stage. Speed's last performance was on 22 April 2023.

== Personal life ==
Speed married model and actor Spencer Hayler on 12 September 2009, and gave birth to their daughter in May 2012 and later a son born 2018.

The family live in Fulham, west London.

Speed is good friends with Charlie Brooks, the actress who played Janine Butcher, her on-screen adversary in EastEnders.

Away from acting she enjoys horse riding, skiing and dance.

== Acting credits ==
=== Film ===
Year	Film	Role	Notes
1991	Impromptu	Young Aurora	
1995	England, My England	Nell Gwyn	
1997	Metroland	Punk girl	Small role
1997	Keep the Aspidistra Flying	Factory girl	Minor role
1998	Shakespeare in Love	Second whore	
2012	Bunking Off	Leanne	Short film
2014	Lizard Girl	Chrissie	Short film
2014	Counting Backwards	Adult Sally	Short film
2022	The Ballad of Olive Morris	Policewoman	Short film

=== Television ===
Year	Programme	Role	Notes
1988	King and Castle	Susie	4 episodes
1991	Dodgem	Rose Penfold	6 episodes
1992–1993	Rides	Becki Jenner	12 episodes
1993	The Bill	Vicky Belham	1 episode
1994–1995, 1999–2004	EastEnders	Natalie Evans	526 episodes
1996	The Prince and the Pauper	Nan Canty	
1996	The Bill	Hayley Robinson	Out of Control, 1 Episode
1997	Casualty	Kerry	Series 11 episode 22: Make Believe
1997	The New Adventures of Robin Hood	Iris	1 episode
1997	Dangerfield	Lorraine	1 episode
1998	The Children of the New Forest	Martha	Television film
1998	Men Behaving Badly	Chambermaid	
1999	An Unsuitable Job for a Woman	Sandy Benningham	1 episode
2004	Holby City	Mandy Fairlock	
2005	Jericho	Bette Dadley	
2006	The Bill	Leanne Brown	
2008–2010	The Bill	DC Stevie Moss	Regular role
2008	Love Soup	Trisha	
2011	Law & Order: UK	Shannon Blake	1 episode
2013	Lewis	Louise Cornish	2 episodes
2013	Holby City	Angela Pritchard	
2013	Doctors	Holly Lyndhurst	
2014	The Dumping Ground	Nerys	1 episode
2015	Cradle to Grave	Bet Baker	Series 1; 8 episodes
2016	National Treasure	Young Marie Finchley	3 episodes
2017–2018	Jamie Johnson	Ms Savage	19 episodes
2017	Call the Midwife	Zelda	Series 6 episode 1
2018	Silent Witness	Ella Weir	”A Special Relationship” 2 episodes
2018	Marcella	Leslie Evans	Season 2; 2 episodes
2019	Doctors	Kate Davis	
2020	After Life	Tracy	”Season 2, Episode 6”
2020	Liar	Counsellor Parks	Series 2 episode 5
2021	Unforgotten	Marnie Barton	Series 4; 6 episodes
2022	Casualty	Rebecca Crawson	Series 36 episode 30: I Will Trust In You
2022	Becoming Elizabeth	Elizabeth Robsart	Series 1 episode 6: What Cannot Be Cured
2025	The Hack	Molly Vian	Series 1
2026	Heartstopper Forever	Susan	Series 3 regular, Netflix
2026	Grace (TV series)	Gina Poole	Series 6 Episode 2: Capture You Dead

=== Radio ===
Year	Programme	Role	Notes
2021–present	The Archers	Stella Pryor	Regular character
