= Tony Caunter =

English actor (1937–2025)

- Caunter as Roy Evans in EastEnders
- Born: Anthony Patrick Caunter; 22 September 1937; Southampton, Hampshire, England
- Died: 13 October 2025 (aged 88); Eastbourne, East Sussex, England
- Occupation: Actor
- Years active: 1954–2019
- Spouse: Frances Wallace (m. 1962; died 2025)
- Children: 4

Anthony Patrick Caunter (22 September 1937 – 13 October 2025) was an English actor, best known for his roles as Jack Shepherd in the Yorkshire Television sitcom Queenie's Castle (1970–1972), DCI Jim Logan in the first three series of Juliet Bravo (1980–1982), and Roy Evans in EastEnders (1994–2003).

== Early life ==
Anthony Patrick Caunter was born on 22 September 1937 in Southampton, England. The second son of Annie Mary and Roy Hobert Caunter, he attended Worthing and Westcliff High Schools. He had an older brother, Roger.

== Career ==
Caunter began his acting career in the 1960s. His numerous television credits included Crown Court, Z-Cars, The Avengers, Casualty, London's Burning, Home to Roost, The Saint, Special Branch, The Champions, Dixon of Dock Green, Catweazle, The Main Chance, The Professionals, The Sweeney, Minder, Pennies From Heaven, Westbeach, Howards' Way, Lovejoy, May to December, Boon, Heartbeat, Juliet Bravo and The Scarlet Pimpernel. Caunter played Titanic's chief officer Henry Wilde in S.O.S. Titanic. He appeared as Jack Shepherd in the Yorkshire Television sitcom Queenie's Castle between 1970 and 1972 and DCI Jim Logan in Juliet Bravo between 1980 and 1982. In The Chief, he played Deputy Chief Constable Arthur Quine.

Caunter appeared in the Doctor Who stories The Crusade (1965), Colony in Space (1971) and Enlightenment (1983). He also appeared in Blake's 7 in the episode "Deliverance" (1978). He portrayed the role of car dealer Roy Evans in the BBC soap opera EastEnders from 1994, until the character's death in 2003.

== Personal life ==
Caunter married Frances Wallace in 1962, and the couple had four children together.

== Death ==
Caunter died at Eastbourne General Hospital in East Sussex on 13 October 2025, at the age of 88, a week after his wife's death.

== Selected filmography ==
=== Film ===
Year	Title	Role	Notes
1965	The Hill	Martin	
1965	The Ipcress File	O.N.I. Man	
1968	A Twist of Sand	Elton	
1968	Hammerhead	Security Man	Uncredited
1969	The Adding Machine	Third Cell Jailer	
1970	The Mind of Mr. Soames	Schoolteacher	
1972	The Asphyx	Warden	
1975	Mister Quilp	Joe Jowl	Uncredited
1979	The Hunchback of Notre Dame	Clopin	TV film
1979	S.O.S. Titanic	Chief Officer Henry Wilde	TV film

=== Television ===
Year	Title	Role	Notes
1963	No Hiding Place	Sgt. Harrison	Episode: "Ticket for Nudes"
1964	Z-Cars	Bickley	Episode: "The Hunch"
1965	Doctor Who	Thatcher	Serial: The Crusade
1965	No Hiding Place	Barney	Episode: "A Fistful of Trouble"
1965	Orlando	Walker	Episode: "Load of Bilge Water"
1966	The Baron	Phillip Darby	Episode: "You Can't Win Them All"
1966	The Likely Lads	Army Sergeant	Episode: "Goodbye to All That"
1966	No Hiding Place	1st M.P. Sgt.	Episode: "A Home Posting"
1966	Quick Before They Catch Us	Sammy	3 episodes
1966	Redcap	C.S.M. Greer	Episode: "Information Received"
1966–1967	United!	Dick Mitchell	57 episodes
1967	The Avengers	Kenilworth	Episode: "Murdersville"
1968	The Champions	Brandon	Episode: "The Gilded Cage"
1968	The Expert	Robinson	Episode: "The Contact"
1968	Z-Cars	Reg Shephard	Episode: "He Must Be Up to No Good" (2 parts)
1969	The Main Chance	Harry Rowlands	Episode: "Body and Soul"
1969	The Saint	Mason	Episode: "The Organisation Man"
1969	The Newcomers	Len Burrows	2 episodes
1969	Parkin's Patch	Jack Bromley	Episode: "The Good Listener"
1969	Special Branch	Police Sergeant	Episode: "The Children of Delight"
1969	Softly Softly	Anderson	Episode: "Proved Connection"
1970	Ace of Wands	Six	3 episodes
1970	Codename	Mullins	Episode: "One for the Lobster Pot"
1970	Dixon of Dock Green	Bert Connolly	Episode: "The Lag's Brigade"
1970	Special Branch	Det. Sgt. Clark	Episode: "Borderline Case"
1970	Softly Softly: Taskforce	Insp. Cox	Episode: "Any Other Night"
1970	Z-Cars	Fred Caunce	Episode: "Threats and Menaces" (2 parts)
1970–1972	Queenie's Castle	Jack	18 episodes
1971	Catweazle	Richardson	Episode: "The Wogle Stone"
1971	Doctor Who	Morgan	Serial: Colony in Space
1971	The Rivals of Sherlock Holmes	Fielder	Episode: "The Affair of the Avalanche Bicycle & Tyre Co. Ltd."
1971	Softly Softly: Taskforce	Murray	Episode: "Marksman"
1972	New Scotland Yard	Det. Insp. Bright	Episode: "And When You're Wrong"
1972	Owen M.D.	Ted Bracegirdle	2 episodes
1973	New Scotland Yard	Mr. Duggan	Episode: "A Year to Kill"
1973	War & Peace	French Corporal	2 episodes
1973	Z-Cars	Peter Guthrie	Episode: "Routine"
1973–1977	Beryl's Lot	Trevor Tonks	47 episodes
1975	The Legend of Robin Hood	Friar Tuck	5 episodes
1975	The Sweeney	Derek Clarke	Episode: "Queen's Pawn"
1976–1978	Crown Court	Brian Harrison / Mr. Tyson / Inspector Charles Cripps	5 episodes
1978	Blake's 7	Ensor	Episode: "Deliverance"
1978	The Onedin Line	Smethurst	Episode: "Double Dealers"
1978	Pennies from Heaven	Cafe Proprietor	Episode: "Better Think Twice"
1978	The Professionals	Det. Sgt. / Maurice Richards	2 episodes
1978	Target	Brice	Episode: "The Run"
1979	Angels	Les Burns	2 episodes
1979	Rumpole of the Bailey	Freddie Allbright	Episode: "Rumpole and the Case of Identity"
1979	Shoestring	Inspector Colson	Episode: "Listen to Me"
1980–1982	Juliet Bravo	Det. Ch. Insp. Jim Logan	14 episodes
1981	Private Schultz	Prison Warder	Episode #1.6
1981	Rentaghost	Jackson	Episode #6.6
1982	The Chinese Detective	Pollitt	Episode: "Secret State"
1982	Take the High Road	Bruno Rheinhardt	3 episodes
1983	The Cleopatras	Archillas	Episode: "51 BC"
1983	Doctor Who	Jackson	Serial: Enlightenment
1983	Don't Wait Up	Police Sergeant	Episode #1.4
1983	Give Us a Break	Jimmy	Episode: "One Good Stroke Deserves Another"
1984	Big Deal	Henry Diamond	8 episodes
1984	The Brief	Sgt. Jackson	Episode: "On the Edge"
1984–1985	Minder	Ch. Insp. Norton	2 episodes
1985	Home to Roost	Christine's Father	Episode: "All You Need is Love"
1985	Howard's Way	Dave Bridger	Episode: "Cat Among the Pigeons"
1986	Running Scared	Frank Butler	6 episodes
1988	Bad Boyes	Hector Ruggles	Episode: "The Icing on the Cake"
1988	Bust	Ray French	Episode: "Love or Profit"
1988	Gems	Halliwell	3 episodes
1988	London's Burning	D.O. Thomas	Episode #1.1
1990	The Bill	D.A.C. Jago	Episode: "A Fresh Start"
1990	Boon	Bertie	3 episodes
1990	Casualty	Cafe Owner	Episode: "Street Life"
1990–1994	The Chief	Dep. Ch. Const. Arthur Quine	11 episodes
1991	Stay Lucky	Morris Dancer	Episode: "Shingle Beach"
1992	Kinsey	Leslie Roper	Episode: "Heads or Tails"
1992	Lovejoy	Russell Potts	Episode: "Loveknots"
1992	Van der Valk	Hans Voss	Episode: "Still Waters"
1993	The Bill	Joe Horder	Episode: "Until Proven Guilty"
1993	Westbeach	Bill Cromer	7 episodes
1994	Anna Lee	Sir Brian West	Episode: "The Cook's Tale"
1994	Heartbeat	Hesketh	Episode: "Turn of the Tide"
1994	May to December	Eddie	2 episodes
1994–2003	EastEnders	Roy Evans	634 episodes
2003	Holby City	Peter Haines	Episode: "Think Again"
2004	Doctors	Cyril Atlee	Episode: "What the Doctor Saw"
2004	Down to Earth	Derek Nolan	Episode: "Can't Buy You Love"
2006	Casualty	Tom Stopes	Episode: "Waste of Space"
2008	Doctors	Simon Adamson	Episode: "Final Accounts"
