= Shaun Williamson =

English actor, singer, media personality and occasional presenter

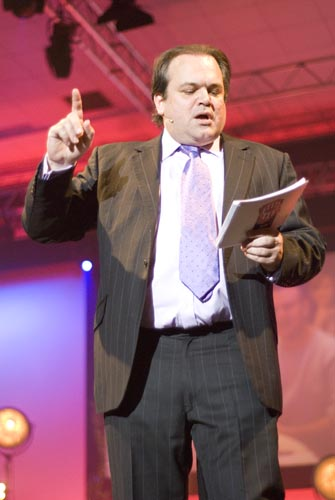
- Williamson at an event in 2008
- Born: Maidstone, Kent, England
- Occupations: Actor; singer; author; newsreader; broadcaster
- Years active: 1989–present
- Height: 5 ft 10 in (1.78 m)
- Spouses: Melanie Sacre (m. 1997; div. 2013); Adele Seager (m. 2018)
- Children: 3

Shaun Williamson is an English actor best known as Barry Evans in EastEnders and as a satirical version of himself in the BBC/HBO sitcom Extras, "Barry from EastEnders".

== Early life ==
Williamson was born in Park Wood, Maidstone. He attended Holy Family RC Primary School, followed by St Simon Stock Catholic School where he frequently played truant. Following school he became a postman, but developed a drink problem, consuming 12 pints of beer a day by the time he was 18. He later said he joined the Royal Navy at that point "to break that cycle". He completed his training at HMS Raleigh. He intended to become a helicopter pilot but was rejected when it was discovered he was colour blind. He subsequently worked in various jobs such as a Bluecoat for Pontins, as a rep for Club 18-30 and one season at Camp America. Aged 26, in 1991 he was working in the Wines & Spirits Department for Safeway, in Walderslade and Strood, when he decided to enlist at the Webber Douglas Academy of Dramatic Art.

== Career ==
=== Television ===
Williamson is widely known for his portrayal of the foolish, hapless Barry Evans in the BBC soap opera EastEnders, a role that he played from 1994 to 2004. This was Williamson's second role in the soap; he previously had a brief role as a paramedic earlier in 1994. In 2009, he stated that he had no regrets about leaving the show.

Williamson was the subject of This Is Your Life in 2001. In 2004, Williamson appeared on and won an episode of Celebrity Stars in Their Eyes, impersonating the singer Meat Loaf. Williamson finished third in the 2007 series of Comic Relief Does Fame Academy. Other television roles have included parts in the detective series Inspector Morse, the ITV drama London's Burning, the BBC sitcom Waiting for God, the Ricky Gervais and Stephen Merchant comedy Extras as a send-up of himself and as Balbus, a midlife crisis afflicted Roman charioteering instructor in historical comedy series Plebs.

Williamson competed in Celebrity Big Brother 20, and became the eighth housemate to be evicted, on day 23. In 2020, Williamson appeared as recurring character Chris Smith, future father-in-law to the titular character played by Spencer Jones in the BBC Two sitcom, Mister Winner. He reprised the role from the pilot which had previously been broadcast in 2017 on BBC One.

=== Stage ===
Stage roles have included Monty the DJ in the West End run and UK tour of Saturday Night Fever, and appearing at Canterbury's Marlowe Theatre from December 2003 to January 2004 in a pantomime production of Snow White and the Seven Dwarfs, alongside Toyah Willcox. In 2006 he starred in the pantomime Dick Whittington at The Playhouse in Weston-super-Mare. He returned to the Marlowe Theatre from December 2007 to January 2008, in Aladdin, alongside Stephen Mulhern. During 2008 he played Nathan Detroit in the touring production of Guys and Dolls, having already appeared in the part in the West End.

In 2008–2009, he was again appearing in Aladdin, this time at the Wyvern Theatre, Swindon. In May 2006, Williamson played the lead in the play Road to Nirvana at The King's Head Theatre London and in October 2006, appeared in a sketch as part of the charity benefit The Secret Policeman's Ball which was staged at the Royal Albert Hall.

In 2009, Williamson toured the UK playing habitual criminal Norman Stanley Fletcher in a stage version of the classic TV comedy Porridge. The script had been newly written by the series' co-authors, Dick Clement and Ian La Frenais. In 2012 he toured in The Ladykillers. He played Baron Bomburst and Lord Scrumptious in the UK tour production of Chitty Chitty Bang Bang.

=== Radio ===
In 2018, Williamson wrote a BBC radio drama series titled Eden's End, set in the Kent hop picking season of 1939. The series starred Shane Taylor (Band of Brothers), Steve Nallon (Spitting Image) and Candis Nergaard (Call the Midwife).

=== Quizzing ===
Williamson spent a year competing in the UK Quiz Grand Prix as research for his book A Matter Of Facts which details the world of elite general knowledge quizzing competitions. During this time he became a Top 50 ranked player in the UK. During an appearance on ITV's Beat the Chasers (in which he won £120,000 for The Paul Strank Charitable Trust based in south London), the Dark Destroyer described him as "celebrity quizzing royalty".

== Music career ==
Williamson has been part of a karaoke singing act called "Barrioke", which is touring the UK throughout 2025. Touring various festivals and small venues, Williamson performs popular songs and has been praised across social media, recently receiving attention for duetting with Cher in an advert for UKTV's rebrand.

== Personal life ==
Williamson has three children and has been married twice. His first child was born in 1987 when Williamson was 22. The child's mother was a circus performer with whom Williamson was in a relationship. After breaking up she told Williamson of her pregnancy but Williamson left to pursue a career in America, promising to care for the child on his return. When he returned the circus performer had married another man and this man was listed as the child's father on the birth certificate. Williamson subsequently married his manager Melanie Sacre and they were married for 16 years; they have two children together. He married Adele, his second wife, in 2018.

== Filmography ==
=== Television ===
Year	Title	Role	Notes
1989	Crime Monthly	Taxi Driver	Episode: "Mirza Murder Casebook"
1994	Waiting for God	Brown	Episode: "A Royal Visit?"
1994	London's Burning	Chris	
1994–2004, 2025	EastEnders	Paramedic / Barry Evans	656 episodes
1994–2008	The Bill	Dave Monks / SO19 Officer	3 episodes
1995	Inspector Morse	Garage Cashier	Episode: "The Way Through the Woods"
1997–1999	Night Fever	Himself; Contestant	4 Episodes
2002	The Basil Brush Show	Evil Furniture Genius	Episode: "The Date"
2005	GB3-Being Young	Mr. Dozey	Television film
2005	Funland	Cliff	Series 1, Episode 2
2005–2007	Extras	Barry / Shaun Williamson / Barry from EastEnders	10 episodes
2007	Holby City	Larry Randle	Episode: "Mirror Man"
2008	Fairy Tales	Sava Stojkovic	Episode: "Rapunzel"
2008	The Slammer	Jimmy Jinx	
2008	Dani's House	Clown	Episode: "Amnesia"
2008–2014	Doctors	Roy Marlin / Walter Twiddle / Bob Robbins	3 episodes
2009–2011	Scoop	Digby Digworth	39 episodes
2011	New Tricks	Martin Fallon	Episode: "The Gentleman Vanishes"
2011	The Celebrity Chase	Shaun Williamson	Broadcast on 29/10/2011
2011–2013	Life's Too Short	Shaun Williamson	5 episodes
2013	Celebrity Juice	Barry	Episode: "Coronation Street vs. EastEnders"
2013	Sooty	Barrie Bonkers	Episode: "The Fancy Dress Party"
2014	Houdini	Riley	2 episodes
2014	Plebs	Balbus	Episode: "The Best Man"
2016	Sexy Murder	Brian Jessop	6 episodes
2017	Casualty	Terry Boydell	Episode: "The Stag, the Dog and the Sheep"
2017	Comedy Playhouse	Chris Smith	Episode: "Mister Winner"
2018	Moving On	Geoff	Episode: "Two Fat Ladies"
2019	Al Murray's Great British Pub Quiz	Himself / Barman / Scorekeeper	20 episodes
2020	Mister Winner	Chris Smith	2 episodes
2021	Beat the Chasers: Celebrity Special	Himself; Contestant; Winner	1 episode
2021	A League of Their Own	Himself / Barry Evans	2 episodes
2023	Significant Other	Jonny	In-production

=== Film ===
Year	Title	Role	Notes
1996	Stella Does Tricks	Mr. Peters' driver	
2008	Daylight Robbery	Police Chief	
2009	The Invention of Lying	Richard Bellison	
2009	Uncut	Marc	
2017	The Blazing Cannons	Mu Mu Manager	
2018	This Is Jayde: The One Hit Wonder	Shaun	Also writer and producer
2018	Paying Mr. McGetty	Himself	
2021	Cold Sun	Alex Huntsworth	

=== Music video ===
Year	Title	Artist	Notes
2020	"Braindead (Heroin Kills)"	Piero Pirupa	
2021	"Heads Down"	Tom Williams	
