= Bianca Jackson =

Fictional character from EastEnders

- EastEnders character
- Portrayed by: Patsy Palmer
- Duration: 1993–1999, 2008–2014, 2019, 2024–2025
- First appearance: Episode 917; 16 November 1993
- Last appearance: Episode 7104; 17 April 2025
- Created by: Tony McHale
- Introduced by: Leonard Lewis (1993); Diederick Santer (2008); Jon Sen (2019); Chris Clenshaw (2024)
- Book appearances: Bianca's Secret Diary
- Spin-off appearances: Ricky & Bianca (2002); Last Tango in Walford (2010); EastEnders: E20 (2010–2011); Liam and the Gang (2013); T & B 4 Eva (2013)
In-universe information
- Other names: Bianca Butcher; Bianca Branning (birth name)
- Occupation: Cleaner; Chip shop worker; Market trader; Trainee hairdresser; Fashion student; Barmaid; Café waitress
- Family: Beale/Branning/Jackson
- Father: David Wicks
- Mother: Carol Jackson
- Stepfather: Alan Jackson
- Stepmother: Lorraine Foster
- Half-brothers: Robbie Jackson; Billie Jackson; Joe Wicks
- Half-sisters: Sonia Fowler; Karen Wicks
- Husband: Ricky Butcher (1997–2000, 2010–2012)
- Sons: Liam Butcher; Morgan Butcher
- Daughters: Tiffany Butcher
- Adoptive daughters: Whitney Dean
- Granddaughters: Dolly Dean-Hudson (adoptive)
- Grandfathers: Pete Beale; Jim Branning
- Grandmothers: Pat Butcher; Reenie Branning
- Uncles: Ian Beale; Simon Wicks; Derek Branning; Max Branning; Jack Branning
- Aunts: April Branning; Suzy Branning
- Nephews: Sami Jackson
- Nieces: Bex Fowler; Julia Fowler; Holly
- First cousins: Bradley Branning; Lauren Branning; Abi Branning; Oscar Branning; Annie Carter; Joey Branning; Alice Branning; Ricky Branning; Amy Mitchell; James Branning; Penny Branning; Steven Beale; Peter Beale; Lucy Beale; Bobby Beale
- Other relatives: Pauline Fowler; Mark Fowler; Michelle Fowler; Martin Fowler; Vicki Fowler; Louie Beale; AJ Branning; Charli Slater

Bianca Jackson (also Butcher) is a fictional character from the BBC soap opera EastEnders, played by Patsy Palmer. The character was introduced by executive producer Leonard Lewis and appeared initially from 1993 to 1999, when Palmer opted to leave. In 2002 executive producer John Yorke brought the character back for a special spin-off show. She returned to EastEnders as a full-time character in April 2008. Palmer took maternity leave in late 2010 and Bianca left the series in January 2011. The character returned in December 2011 after Palmer signed a "working mums" contract, which granted her leave from the soap between April and November 2012. The actress quit EastEnders in 2014 and Bianca departed on 12 September 2014. Palmer reprised the role on 2 September 2019 for a guest stint and a second guest stint was scheduled for 2020, but later cancelled. Beginning in early 2024, Palmer reprised her role for just over a year, between 4 March 2024 and 17 April 2025.

During her first run on the show, in the 1990s, Bianca was known for her bizarre sense of style, sharp tongue and fiery temper, as well as her romantic chemistry with established character Ricky Butcher (Sid Owen); the two represent one of the show's most memorable relationships to date, which is best remembered for when Bianca often screams "Rickaaaaaaay!" whenever they argue with each other. She has also been featured in many central plot developments such as affairs, feuds, bereavements, family problems, spina bifida and having an abortion. Bianca's other storylines in her first stint have included her troubled relationships with parents Carol Jackson (Lindsey Coulson) and David Wicks (Michael French) along with their family members; an on-off friendship with childhood school-mate Natalie Evans (Lucy Speed); a more stronger companionship with best friend Tiffany Mitchell (Martine McCutcheon); a rivalry with Ricky's other spouse Sam Mitchell (Danniella Westbrook); a feud with Sam's older brother Grant (Ross Kemp) over his volatile marriage with Tiffany; and then cheating on Ricky when she has an affair with Carol's boyfriend Dan Sullivan (Craig Fairbrass), the latter of which culminates in her 1999 departure from the show. Since her 2008 return, her storylines have included coping with the discovery that her new fiancé Tony King (Chris Coghill) is a paedophile who had sexually abused her surrogate daughter Whitney Dean (Shona McGarty); remarrying Ricky for a second time; going to prison for assault and theft; struggling with money problems; forming a close friendship with Kat Slater (Jessie Wallace); having a short-lived romance with old lover Terry Spraggan (Terry Alderton); being stalked by Tony's son Leo (Tom Wells); dealing with depression; exploring an ADHD diagnosis; seeking to exonerate her younger sister Sonia (Natalie Cassidy) after she is falsely accused of murder; being kidnapped by her sister's boyfriend Reiss Colwell (Jonny Freeman); and coming into loggerheads with Sonia's estranged father Terry Cant (Glen Davies).

== Creation ==
=== Background ===
In his book, EastEnders: The First 10 Years: A Celebration, EastEnders scriptwriter Colin Brake describes 1994 as a "historic" year for EastEnders, as in April, a third weekly episode was introduced. Due to the programme's increased frequency, a number of new characters were introduced to the regular cast in the latter part of 1993 and early 1994. Among them were the Jackson family, created by Tony McHale: mother, Carol (Lindsey Coulson), her four children, Bianca (Patsy Palmer), the oldest, Robbie (Dean Gaffney), Sonia (Natalie Cassidy), and Billie (Devon Anderson), the youngest, as well as Carol's partner, Alan Jackson (Howard Antony). Though Carol and Alan were not initially married in the serial, and though Alan was only the biological father of Billie, the whole family took on Alan's surname. It later transpired that David Wicks (Michael French) was Bianca's father. Various members of the family began to appear sporadically from November 1993 onwards, but in episodes that aired early in 1994, the Jacksons moved from Walford Towers, a block of flats, to the soap's focal setting of Albert Square. Their slow introduction was a deliberate attempt by the programme makers to introduce the whole family over a long period. The Jacksons have been described by Brake as a "classic problem family".

=== Casting ===
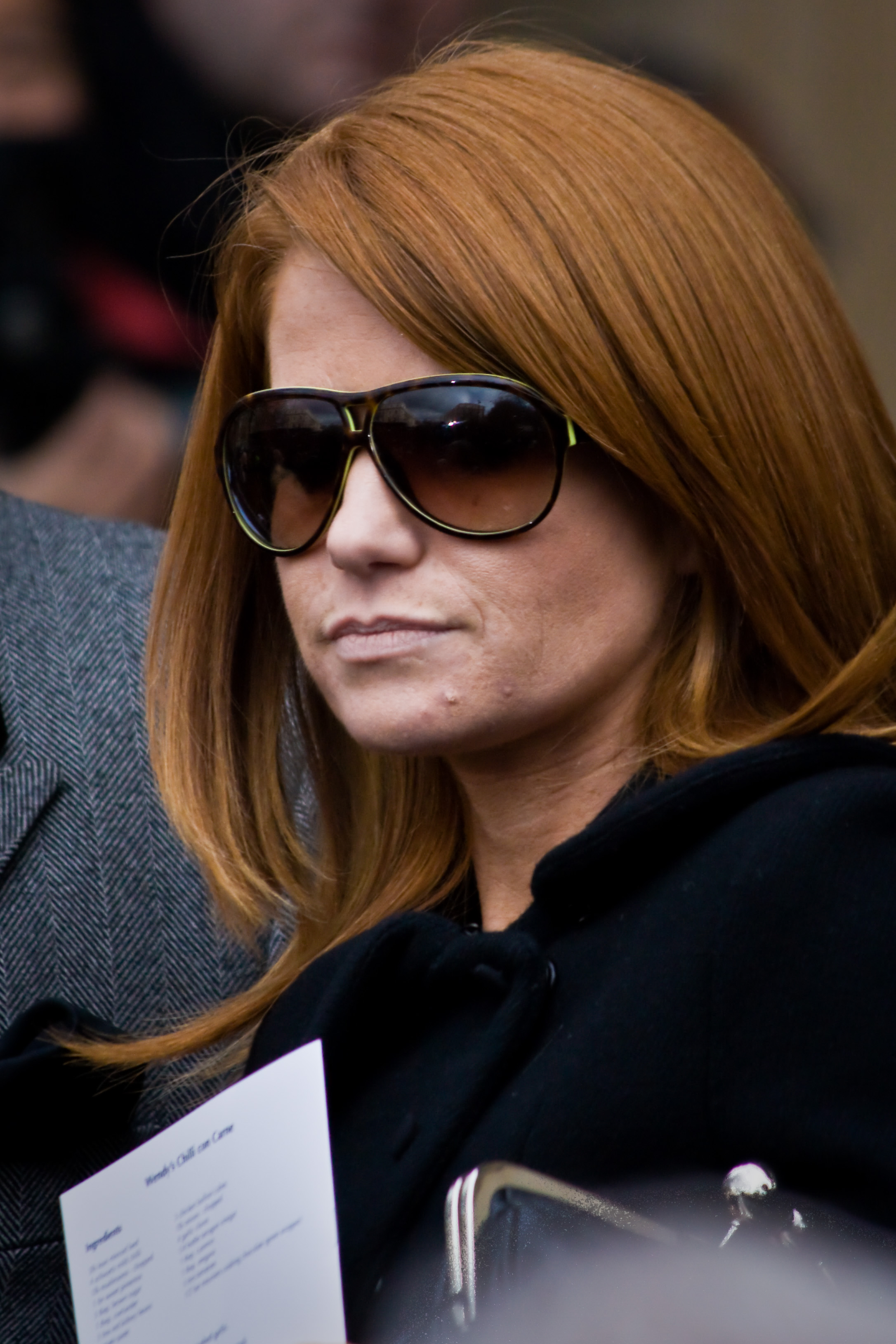
Patsy Palmer (pictured) was cast to play Bianca in 1993.

Future Spice Girl Emma Bunton auditioned for the role of Bianca; however, it was actress Patsy Palmer who was eventually cast. Hester Lacey of The Independent has described Palmer's casting as an "accident", as she did not formally audition for the role. EastEnders casting director Jane Deitch and writer–director McHale visited her drama class at the Anna Scher Theatre looking for a girl aged 16 or under. Palmer was not on the list of people they wanted to see as she was older, but she caught the attention of Deitch when she was messing around and giggling with friends. At the end of the class, Palmer was asked by McHale to do something, so Anna Scher asked her to improvise a monologue based on the line "I can't believe you just said that." The next day, Scher contacted Palmer to say she had been offered an audition. When she arrived at the audition, McHale told producers Palmer was 16 as she would have been refused the part. She was offered a three-month contract the same day. In 1996, Palmer commented to Lacey: "I've been a lucky girl. I always used to say I'd love to get in EastEnders, because I used to think 'God, I'll never get a part where I have to speak really posh', – I'm not very good at accents." Palmer was 21 when she first appeared on-screen as 16-year-old Bianca.

=== Characterisation ===
Bianca has been classified by Rupert Smith, author of EastEnders: 20 years in Albert Square, as a drama queen, a "strong passionate [woman]" and "Walford's trouble-maker-in-chief". She has also been described by Reuters as "feisty" and someone "who never minced her words". In 1996, Palmer described Bianca as someone who deserves "a good slap". She added, "I probably wouldn't like Bianca if I knew her in real-life. But I do love playing the character. She is so cheeky and gets to say outrageous things".

Deemed "a woman you would not want to cross" by James Rampton of The Independent, Bianca is a tenacious foe, but a loyal friend. The way the character is portrayed, as a "person who wouldn't take nonsense from anyone", has led Rampton to comment that she embodies "girl power", a cultural phenomenon of the mid-late 1990s. He added, "Bianca could sulk for Britain – and we adored her for it." However, Rampton also noted that underneath Bianca's bravado, the character is capable of showing "the most affecting vulnerability".

== Development ==
In her first six years in the soap, Bianca's storylines included affairs, feuds, bereavements, abortion, and a problematic marriage to Ricky Butcher.

=== Marriage to Ricky Butcher ===
"Rickaaaaaaay!"
Bianca's famous catchphrase, from the 8 April 2008 episode of EastEnders.

Bianca's relationship with mechanic Ricky Butcher (Sid Owen) has been central to her narrative; their affiliation began in 1994. Palmer and Owen already knew each other before working together on the soap, as both attended the Anna Scher theatre school. Owen has said, "We practically grew up together. We'd known each other for years. It was weird when she started on the show and we began playing the 'Ricky & Bianca Get To Know Each Other' bit. I had already spent a lot of time with Patsy. I think we were both seven when we met."

The dynamics of their relationship were clear from the start, with Bianca portrayed as the dominant, bossy and authoritative partner, while Ricky was shown as the hen-pecked, dim-witted "loser" or "soft touch", comically under the thumb of his female counterpart. James Rampton from The Independent has commented, "to her eternally put-upon husband, Ricky, Bianca was a ferocious reincarnation of H Rider Haggard's 'She Who Must Be Obeyed'." Bianca was notorious for shouting the catchphrase "Rickaaaaaaay!" (a cockney pronunciation of Ricky) at her lover, and Palmer admitted in 2008 that "not a day has gone by in nine years when someone hasn't shouted that from cars and even up at my bedroom window at night." Rampton has suggested that Bianca's catchphrase – "Rickaaaaaaay!" – transitioned, becoming "shorthand for any sort of heinous henpecking." On Friday Night with Jonathan Ross on 18 April 2008, Palmer explained that it was actually Ross, as a DJ, who had originally inspired the catchphrase.

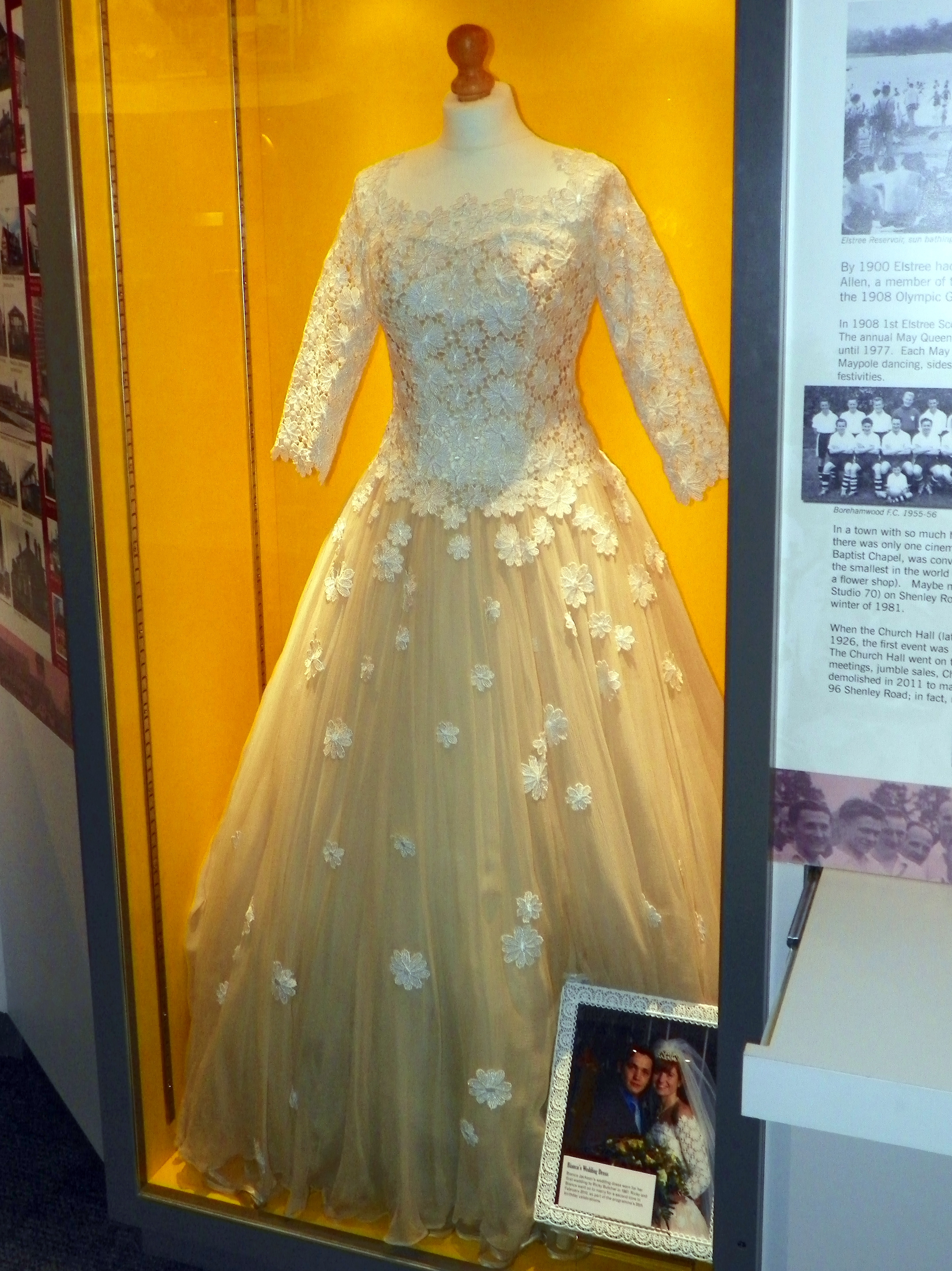
The wedding dress worn by Bianca for her wedding to Ricky in April 1997. The wedding episode was watched by 22 million viewers.

One of the first notable storylines featuring the couple occurred in 1995, when Ricky cheated on Bianca by sleeping with her "put-upon sidekick", Natalie Evans (Lucy Speed). On-screen Natalie and Ricky found themselves sidelined and bullied by Bianca, forcing them together and leading to their eventual affair, which continued for several weeks on-screen, with Ricky seeing both Natalie and Bianca. The storyline reached its climax on 21 February 1995; 17.0 million viewers tuned in to witness Bianca discovering that her boyfriend was sleeping with her best friend. The characters separated but reconciled later in the year when Ricky supported Bianca through a personal crisis: the revelation that she had unknowingly tried to seduce her estranged father David Wicks (Michael French).

Various crises between the characters were featured over the following years, causing them to break up and reconcile numerous times. In the book Seeing Things: Television in the Age of Uncertainty, author John Ellis uses the couple's combustible relationship as an example of emotional intensity and pathos: "A couple like Ricky and Bianca [...] can have constantly sniped at each other for several episodes, for no apparent dramatic purpose except that it is the nature of their relationship. Then they will suddenly be confronted by a life-changing decision [...] There is suddenly a shift in emotional intensity for the audience. Every word now counts, and all the previous audience attitudes of irritation or even condescension to this 'not very bright couple' [...] become a feeling of utter absorption in their dilemma." The BBC has reported that Bianca and Ricky's on-off romance "captivated millions of fans", and in April 1997 attracted "one of the biggest soap audiences ever", with 22 million viewers tuning in to see them marry. In 2000, Owen stated that the storyline he most enjoyed in EastEnders was the build up and marriage to Bianca, because "the public's enthusiasm for the event was a great motivation".

=== Spina bifida ===
In 1997, the character was featured in a storyline about hydrocephalus ("water on the brain") and spina bifida, a developmental birth defect resulting in an incompletely formed spinal cord of the baby. After becoming pregnant with Ricky's baby, a pre-natal scan revealed that her unborn foetus had the conditions. In the storyline, Bianca agonised about whether or not to have an abortion, but eventually decided to terminate her pregnancy at 20 weeks. In scenes shown after the abortion, Bianca and Ricky were given the chance to see and hold their dead daughter, named Natasha, after the birth (Ricky was unable to do this, though Bianca later said her baby had been "perfect"), and a period of heavy grief followed as the characters came to terms with what they had done. The Peterborough-based Association for Spina Bifida and Hydrocephalus (ASBAH) helped and provided information to the programme makers during the storyline.

Bianca's decision to abort reportedly angered a proportion of viewers, including parents with disabled children, who rang the BBC to complain that they showed the abortion of a disabled baby. However, many were "moved" by the storyline, and Patsy Palmer received critical acclaim for her acting throughout. Palmer was nominated in the 'Best Actress' category at the Royal Television Society Awards – the first soap actress to ever be nominated.

The storyline was later used to spread a public message. When Bianca became pregnant once again in 1998, the scriptwriters included scenes of a practitioner advising the character to take folic acid, which protects against spina bifida. The ASBAH issued a public plea to EastEnders, urging them to allow Bianca's second baby to be born with spina bifida, in order to show parents that having a baby with spina bifida is "not the end of the world". This did not occur, however, and Bianca was shown to give birth to a premature but healthy baby, Liam, in an episode that aired on Christmas Day 1998.

=== Departure (1999) ===
The character was featured in various other storylines, including a close friendship with her childhood friend, Tiffany Mitchell (Martine McCutcheon); a feud with Tiffany's volatile husband, Grant Mitchell (Ross Kemp); a tug-of-love for Ricky's affections with his first wife and Grant's younger sister, Sam (Danniella Westbrook); a one-night stand with Lenny Wallace (Des Coleman), causing a sexually transmitted disease scare; and coping with Tiffany's death. In November 1998, the BBC announced that Patsy Palmer had decided to leave EastEnders to spend more time with her family. The BBC said that Bianca would not be killed off, and a spokesman commented: "Bianca has always been an amazingly powerful character and the door is open to her if she wants to return in the future. She has been fantastic in the years she has been in EastEnders and we will miss her." Palmer was one of several high-profile EastEnders stars to announce their departures that year; McCutcheon had been axed and Kemp also decided to leave. and Gillian Taylforth left the serial in 1998 after 13 years playing Kathy Beale. The BBC said, "no-one is bigger than the show, which is doing extremely well at the moment. We will send her off with all our very best wishes." Richard Stokes, EastEnders' series editor and producer of Palmer's exit storyline commented, "you don't expect people to stay here for ever. But it's a double-edged sword. Yes, it's a shame when a well-loved character announces they're going, but the flipside is that it provides us with the space to do the best possible story. If someone is going, you can up the stakes. The whole of Bianca's story was developed once we knew she was going to go."

Bianca's exit storyline revolved on an extramarital affair with her mother's new boyfriend Dan Sullivan (Craig Fairbrass). Lindsey Coulson, who played Bianca's mother Carol, returned to the serial especially to facilitate Palmer's exit. Carol had last been seen on-screen in 1997. When the affair was uncovered, Bianca was disowned by Carol, and her marriage to Ricky ended after Carol forced her to confess the affair to him too. Bianca's exit week was spread out over five episodes, beginning with an hour-long special on Sunday 5 September 1999 (at the time the typical weekly broadcast was 3 episodes a week). Mal Young, BBC's Controller of Continuing Drama Series, described the revelatory hour-long Bianca special as a Play For Today, and Kathryn Flett of The Guardian described the week's episodes as a "bravura, edge-of-the-sofa, five-night performance". Commenting on her exit in 1999, Palmer said, "It was really sad. We were all crying our eyes out – the crew as well as the cast. The tears you see on screen are real."

Nicola Methven of the Daily Mirror has described the discovery of Bianca's affair as "one of the truly great emotion-charged scenes in soap history". Bianca left Walford on a train for Manchester with her son Liam, in an episode that aired in September 1999. In 2001, Bianca's exit storyline was voted as one of "Top 20 greatest soap moments of all time". Chosen by thousands of TV viewers, the televised countdown was presented by Dale Winton and aired on ITV in 2001.

=== Spin-off (2002) ===
In 2001, the BBC announced that Patsy Palmer and Sid Owen would reprise their roles as Bianca and Ricky, for a special spin-off, entitled EastEnders: Ricky & Bianca. Filmed in Manchester in January 2002, the two part, hour-long special reunited the characters for the first time in over two years. The spin-off or "soap bubble" was part of plans by Mal Young, the BBC controller of drama serials, to expand the EastEnders brand. He created a "bubbles unit" to make, at most, six one-off specials a year. EastEnders: Ricky & Bianca aired in May 2002, and proved a ratings winner, with more than 10 million viewers tuning in.

In the spin-off, Bianca had fallen upon hard times, and accidentally got a visiting Ricky embroiled in a drugs heist. Despite talk of reconciling, Bianca opted to leave Ricky behind once again, leaving Liam in his care. The spin-off brought in various characters unrelated to the main serial, including Vince, Bianca's drug dealing boss played by Craig Charles, and Ricky's fiancée Cassie, played by Sally Ann Triplett. Both Ricky and Liam returned to the main serial as regular characters later that year, without Bianca. In an interview, Palmer discussed the spin-off and the reasons why she did not want to return to EastEnders: "I have absolutely no desire to return to EastEnders. Not at all. In fact, I think that brief spin-off of a storyline for Ricky and Bianca was a double-edged sword. On one hand, I don't think we should ever have done it, it was a mistake on my behalf. But on the other, it convinced me that Bianca was someone that I did not want to see again. She was past history as far as I was concerned, I certainly learned that. Don't get me wrong, I had the time of my life when I was in EastEnders in the middle and late nineties and I worked with some terrific people both in front of and behind the camera. But that was then and this is now – the cast has nearly all changed and going back would be worse than foolish." In August 2005, Palmer reiterated that she had no desire to return to EastEnders and branded the show "rubbish".

=== Reintroduction (2008) ===
"[I'm] really excited about rejoining the cast and working with old friends again [...] I can't wait to explore what Bianca has been doing with her life and seeing what she is going to get up to next"

— Patsy Palmer

Despite Palmer's earlier reservations, it was announced on 29 October 2007 that she would be reprising the role of Bianca. EastEnders executive producer Diederick Santer said he was "delighted" that Bianca was returning, commenting: "Millions grew up with her and, like the audience, I can't wait to see her back in the show. I'm really looking forward to the next chapter in her story."

On 30 October 2007, a day after the announcement of Bianca's return, it was announced that Sid Owen would also be returning to the show as Ricky. Owen commented: "It will be interesting to see what has been happening to Ricky and Bianca over the last few years. Although I must admit I'm not looking forward to her nagging me by shouting his name." Santer commented: "First Patsy comes home, now Sid! Ricky and Bianca were a hugely popular and well-loved partnership on the show, spawning one of the best (and perhaps most irritating) of TV catchphrases – Rickaaaaay!"

On 18 March 2008, Mark Jefferies of the Daily Mirror announced that Bianca would return with four children: Whitney Dean (Shona McGarty), the fifteen-year-old daughter of Bianca's deceased partner, Nathan; Liam Butcher (James Forde), Bianca and Ricky's son who previously appeared in the serial; Tiffany Butcher (Maisie Smith), Bianca's five-year-old daughter with Ricky but believed to be Nathan's; and Morgan Butcher (Devon Higgs), Bianca's three-year-old son who "gets spoilt the most out of all of the kids".

To promote the characters' return, the BBC began airing trailers across the BBC network in March 2008. One trailer utilised Bianca's "trademark holler" of Ricky's name, which is so loud that it smashes the windows of The Queen Victoria public house. The trailer features The Righteous Brothers's "Hung on You". Another trailer sees Bianca singing The Jackson 5 hit "I Want You Back" and performing a dance routine with her four children. The advertisement uses the tag line "Introducing The Jackson 5". Within three days of being posted on the video sharing website YouTube, the trailer had been viewed 52,000 times.

The character returned on-screen on 1 April 2008, but made her first appearance back in the soap's setting of Albert Square the following week, drawing 10.4 million viewers and 42.6% of the total TV viewing audience. In the storyline, Bianca had fallen on hard times, and after being evicted from her flat her children were taken into custody, so Bianca returned to Walford to seek help from her grandmother Pat Butcher (Pam St Clement). In the documentary EastEnders: Ricky and Bianca, which aired to celebrate the character's return, the changes in Bianca's character were noted: "The carefree, wild child of yesterday, has been replaced by the wore-torn and downtrodden single mum of four. Bianca has done what she always wanted to avoid, repeating the mistakes that her mother Carol had made." EastEnders' series consultant Simon Ashdown has commented, "Bianca's still the same Bianca in a way, she still speaks before she thinks, comes out fists flying. She's got that family of misfit kids with different fathers [...] She's like Carol." The BBC described the character's comeback as a "big hit". However, James Walton from The Telegraph accused the Jackson family of being melodramatic and "boring", adding "Perhaps the storyline is meant to be an updated version of [1966 BBC drama] Cathy Come Home – yet if so, the writers have forgotten one important thing. We're supposed to be rooting for the mother rather than for Social Services."

=== Tony King and pedophilia ===
Bianca's most notable initial storyline upon her return was a pedophilia plot revolving around her new boyfriend Tony King (Chris Coghill), and her 15-year-old step daughter, Whitney. The idea for the storyline was conceptualized by writer Simon Ashdown and other scriptwriters, when they were brainstorming ideas for Bianca's return to EastEnders. They had seen a documentary about homelessness and had been struck by an image of a woman and child at a bus stop with nowhere to go, a scene that was used to similar effect in Bianca and her family's return episode. They considered the homeless family's predicament and were left pondering "What might happen to them? They would be easy prey... What if a pedophile noticed the child, who might be, say, 12, and pretended to be the woman's saviour? She would be too grateful to notice that this was unusual behaviour, that he seemed to have few friends or family". They pitched the idea to John Yorke, controller of BBC drama production, who said that "It drew a sharp intake of breath. Most EastEnders stories that have been good and successful have been the ones that caused the sharp intake of breath, so they're always the kind of stories you look for." However, pedophilia as a storyline had been pitched before, but the idea had been vetoed because they could not find the right storyline and characters to proceed and, as the topic was so controversial, producers had been unwilling to take the risk. Diederick Santer commented, "We knew that something like 16% of under-16s have been sexually abused at some point, but if you can't find a story, it's an issue that sits there, dead, on the show." It has been noted in the media that pedophilia is a subject rarely shown on pre-watershed terrestrial television, and although EastEnders had broached it in 2001 with Kat Slater (Jessie Wallace) and her abusive uncle, Harry Slater (Michael Elphick), this was scripted to have happened in the past and focused on the effect it had on the victim as an adult.

Yorke was initially unconvinced at the Jackson pedophilia storyline proposal. He commented to The Guardian in 2008, "My standpoint has always been that there has to be a good editorial justification. If it's just entertainment, or just sensation, or just the bogeyman in this case, then I don't think that's a good enough reason." However, Yorke was convinced by Santer, who opined that "it would be a talking point that could truly educate and inform". It was decided that Bianca's stepdaughter Whitney would be the character that Bianca's boyfriend Tony groomed for sex. According to Bianca's backstory, Tony was "a Mancunian who [...] had one day given Bianca a lift home, three years before her return to Walford, and noticed, standing in the hallway, 12-year-old Whitney in her pyjamas." EastEnders worked closely with NSPCC when devising the storyline. The NSPCC's statistics suggested that 11% of children under 16 experienced "sexual abuse by a person known but unrelated to them, often a boyfriend or girlfriend, while only 5% have been interfered with by someone unknown or whom they had just met; 1% by a parent or carer; and fewer than 1% by a professional in a position of trust". Thus it was decided that Whitney, unrelated to Tony in any biological sense, would be his victim and that Tony deliberately targeted the Jackson family, wooing Bianca, in order to groom Whitney. This idea, according to a BBC researcher, was based on real life cases. The truth was revealed to Bianca in an episode that aired in December 2008, when Whitney confessed to her stepmother, professing to love Tony. There followed Tony's imprisonment and a court case in 2009. Palmer was widely praised by critics for her performance during the reveal episodes. The storyline prompted an increase in calls to the children's help-line, ChildLine. A ChildLine director, Julie Crossan, said, "Child sex abuse storylines on programmes such as EastEnders also encourage children to speak out. As a result, more children now understand what sexual abuse is and are increasingly willing to turn to ChildLine for help."

When asked how she felt about the storyline, Palmer commented: "It would be brilliant if it helped somebody. If one person out there who's been abused saw that [the legal system] go out of their way to make it easier on the victim – Whitney's evidence is given by video link – it will be worth it."

=== Reunion with Ricky Butcher ===
In November 2009 it was announced that coinciding with the return of her on-screen family and the 25th anniversary of EastEnders, Bianca and Ricky would remarry in February 2010. Entertainment website Digital Spy reported that: "Show producers have confirmed that the divorced pair's latest love twist will begin at Christmas when Ricky [...] decides to pop the question to his childhood sweetheart. Their wedding will take place in February to coincide with the Walford soap's 25th anniversary celebrations." A spin-off DVD focusing on preparations for the wedding, EastEnders: Last Tango in Walford, was released in February 2010. It features Tiffany arranging a comeback for Bianca's family, plus archive footage and interviews. Palmer told What's on TV magazine: "I prefer it when Ricky and Bianca are not together but it's great too when they are. I'm looking forward to the return of her family. Bianca hasn't spoken to her mum since the whole Dan thing so it'll be good stuff." The wedding scenes were filmed at St. Peter's Church in the St. Albans city centre.

Talking about the 25th anniversary week, Santer explained that he wanted great stories to get people talking, saying "That's [...] why we're doing the soap wedding of the year – and perhaps the soap wedding of the decade – with Ricky and Bianca. The romance played against the thriller story is a great balance, which I hope the audience will be both gripped by and satisfied with. The wedding is the perfect opportunity for us to bring back the much-loved Jackson characters – Carol, Sonia, Robbie and Billie."

=== Temporary departures (2011–2012) ===
On 1 August 2010, it was reported that Palmer was pregnant with her fourth child and that she would take maternity leave from EastEnders. To facilitate the departure, Bianca will feature in a major storyline, which executive producer Bryan Kirkwood said was the only possible reason Bianca would have for leaving her family. In December 2010, it was announced that Natalie Cassidy would return as part of Bianca's departure storyline which started in January 2011. Bianca's departure was broadcast on 21 January 2011. Palmer gave birth earlier than expected, meaning that she started leave three weeks before she planned to. Key moments were therefore not filmed, and changes had to be made to the storyline to accommodate her absence. Bianca reappeared from December 2011, though Palmer stated in February 2011 that she was in no hurry to return, did not miss it and did not know when she would be back. On 19 July 2011, Palmer revealed that she had signed a new 'working mums' contract and would be returning before the end of the year.

It was confirmed in April 2012 that Bianca, Carol and Bianca's children would depart Albert Square later that month for six months. Explaining her temporary departure, Palmer said, "I'm only taking time off now because this is when the kids' holidays are. When I re-signed my contract I said, 'I love EastEnders, but I love my kids more'. Listen, I can imagine staying in the show till I'm in my 60s, but it's a full-on job. If they hadn't been prepared to give me time off, I'd have had to choose the kids." Bianca left the show on 27 April 2012, when she was sent back to prison for attempting to steal from the market, before returning on 27 November of that year.

=== Relationship with Terry Spraggan and departure (2014) ===
It was announced on 23 August 2013, that Bianca's latest boyfriend, Terry Spraggan (Terry Alderton) would arrive on the square, a short time after meeting him off-screen in Manchester.

It was confirmed in April 2014 that Palmer would be leaving EastEnders and her final scenes will air in the Autumn. A spokesman for Palmer said: "Patsy is really sad to be leaving the show as she loves playing Bianca and working with executive producer Dominic Treadwell-Collins but she knows it's the right decision at this time in her life." The soap's executive producer Dominic Treadwell-Collins, who has decided not to kill off Bianca, said: "We are so sad that Patsy has decided to leave us but completely understand it's the right time for her. Bianca won't be leaving Albert Square until the Autumn so there's still a lot more to come from her on screen this year – and the door will be left wide open for her return. We won't be getting rid of Bianca's puffa jacket just yet". It was revealed months later that an upcoming storyline would involve Bianca and Terry departing alongside their children, minus Liam and Whitney. A teaser for the storyline was released on 29 August 2014.

=== Subsequent returns ===
On 22 May 2019, it was announced that Palmer would reprise her role as Bianca for a guest stint, five years after her departure. The decision to reintroduce the character was made by Jon Sen, the show's new executive producer, who revealed that this was "high on [his] wish list" when he joined the soap. He revealed that Bianca would feature in "a blistering storyline that will grip fans" and expressed his delight at her return. Palmer appeared on This Morning during the following month to discuss her return, confirming that she would be filming for three weeks. On the character's return, Palmer commented, "I've always said it's odd when major characters don't return when something [major is happening]." The actress also explained that as she lives in the US, she would not be able to commit to a longer contract so the shorter one worked better for her. A trailer promoting Bianca's return was released on 23 August 2019, and the character returns in episode 5982, originally broadcast on 2 September 2019.

"As always, Bianca has the best intentions and always wants to do the right thing, but amidst the chaos of a wedding, things definitely don't go to plan."

— Patsy Palmer summarising Bianca's 2019 return

Palmer's return marks the first time she has been invited back to EastEnders. Her agent informed her that the story team had planned a story for Bianca, so she agreed to a return. The show's senior executive producer, Kate Oates, revealed that she planned for the character to return for the show's autumn launch, since she wanted to reintroduce "some classic names in the show". Bianca returns for Whitney's wedding to Callum Highway (Tony Clay), although Callum is struggling with his sexuality and having an affair with Ben Mitchell (Max Bowden). Palmer thought that Bianca would be angry with Callum's deceit but would "just love him" after realising how much he cares for Whitney as he is "such a sweet guy". On the wedding drama, Palmer commented, "like any Walford wedding, things don't quite go to plan... at all." On the night before the wedding, Bianca meets with Kat Slater (Jessie Wallace) for a night out, but they are arrested and have to race to the wedding. Palmer expressed how Bianca is proud to see Whitney getting married.

Bianca also becomes involved in the plots featuring Tiffany. Palmer pointed out that Bianca understands that her absence in Tiffany's life has repercussions. The actress also confirmed that Bianca has been involved in trouble during her off-screen absence, which explains her silence. Palmer explained that both Bianca and Tiffany have things they should tell each other, but they are avoiding it as they want to "protect" each other. She hoped that they would be able to rebuild their relationship.

Palmer enjoyed filming with the soap, but found the experience exhausting. The costume department purchased a new wardrobe for Bianca, which Palmer liked and thought reflected more modern clothing. She also liked reuniting with the cast and crew and revealed that she had maintained contact with Cassidy and McGarty, in particular, since leaving in 2014. The actress also commented on returning to the show's set, describing it as a "second home".

The character's return sparks a long-term storyline for the show which would last "12 to 18 months". Oates wanted to reintroduce Bianca as part of a bigger story and wanted to create a story that "propels after she's gone". Sen added that the show's "diligence to the audience and the drama meant that we had to make sure it kicked off a story". He also confirmed that Bianca's surrounding characters would be featured in the new story as he believed that is how the "soap works best". The story was revealed during the final episode of Bianca's return stint with actor Tom Wells introduced as Leo King, the son of Tony. It emerges that Bianca spent time in prison during her absence after attacking Leo and after seeing him in Walford, Bianca threatens Leo to stay away from her family. Sen confirmed the new plot, describing it as "a gripping new story".

On 21 February 2020, it was reported that Palmer had reprised the role again for a second guest stint. A show spokesperson confirmed that producers had invited Palmer to return again for Whitney's story involving Leo after she kills him in self defence. They also hinted that Bianca may not be "helpful" for Whitney. Palmer was due to film her guest return in early 2020, but her appearance was cancelled due to the production impact of the COVID-19 pandemic.

In February 2024, it was announced Palmer would be reprising the role once again and that Bianca would be returning for a "short stint". After appearing in two episodes airing on 4 and 5 March., Bianca appeared for a further five weeks from 29 April until 12 June and again from 23 September, of the same year. During this stint, Bianca appeared more regularly and also made an appearance in the live episode for the shows 40th anniversary which involved the culmination of her storyline with Reiss Colwell (Jonny Freeman) after he kidnapped her for four months.

In June 2025, Palmer did not rule out another return for the character.

== Storylines ==
=== 1993–1999 ===
Bianca Jackson first arrived at Albert Square in Walford, a fictional borough in East London, with her family in mid-November 1993; she is joined by her mother Carol (Lindsey Coulson), the latter's love interest Alan (Howard Antony), and Bianca's half-sister Sonia (Natalie Cassidy) alongside their half-brothers Robbie (Dean Gaffney) and Billie (Devon Anderson) respectively.

As the family settle themselves on the square, Bianca starts running her own clothing stall on Bridge Street market; she originally became the market assistant of local resident Sanjay Kapoor (Deepak Verma) after initially working for her uncle Ian Beale (Adam Woodyatt) at his fish and chip shop. Later on she begins dating Ian's business competitor Richard Cole (Ian Reddington), until he gets board and swiftly dumps her; Bianca would then get revenge on Richard by harassing him with pranks and stealing his credit card. Bianca meets Carol's ex-boyfriend David Wicks (Michael French) and they enjoy mutual flirtation with each other until Carol informs David that Bianca is his daughter. Horrified, David promptly keeps his distance and Bianca remains unaware of their biological relationship.

One night an intoxicated Bianca is nearly assaulted. She is rescued by David and when she tries to kiss him, he confesses that he is her father. Bianca is left stunned and humiliated. Initially she feels hostile and resentful over David's absence for the majority of her life. Eventually, Bianca has a change of heart and comes to accept David as her father. She is keen to bond with him and he appears to recuperate in the matter. But the relationship is further complicated in July 1995 when David confides in the Samaritans charity that he still feels sexually attracted to Bianca despite the knowledge that he is her biological father. A case of GSA, this was one of EastEnders' most controversial and daring storylines at this point in the show's history. Bianca is left confused by David's unexplained strange and occasionally hostile behaviour, especially as he never fully admits to Bianca the truth behind his initial feelings towards her. Eventually, the two start to naturally bond as a father and daughter.

Soon enough Bianca gets acquainted with local mechanic Ricky Butcher (Sid Owen) and they become a couple after starting a relationship with each other. After moving in a bedsit together, their romance continues to develop until Ricky cheats on Bianca and sleeps with her old classmate Natalie Price (Lucy Speed). It isn't long until Bianca finds out about their dalliance and she breaks up with Ricky before driving Natalie out of the square. Eventually, she reconciles with them and Bianca resumes her relationship with Ricky. This is nearly threatened again when Bianca sleeps with his mate Lenny Wallace (Des Coleman), but soon regrets it when she fears she is pregnant by him. It turns out to be a false alarm, but Bianca realises how much Ricky means to her and so she marries him. She later becomes pregnant, but a prenatal scan shows her unborn child has spina bifida and hydrocephalus. Distraught, Bianca has an abortion, which strains her marriage. Ricky learns of her infidelity with Lenny after a STD scare. Ricky considers ending their marriage, but Bianca convinces him to give her another chance. He agrees and their marriage seems to improve when she later gets pregnant again, this time with Ricky's child.

During this time, Bianca gets reacquainted with her best friend Tiffany Raymond (Martine McCutcheon) they spend a lot of occasion clubbing together on various nights. Their companionship proves to be a strong one when Bianca begins clashing with Tiffany's estranged husband, Grant Mitchell (Ross Kemp), over his volatile behaviour and frequently urges Tiffany to leave him. At first Tiffany's marriage with Grant is reformed when she gives birth to their daughter Courtney by caesarean section, later appointing Bianca as the child's godmother, but then Grant becomes abusive towards Tiffany and he later injures her on Boxing Day 1997 following another heated argument between them. When Bianca finds out, she is furious and urges Tiffany to call the police on Grant. But in the end Tiffany refuses and she forgives Grant rather than take Bianca's advice. Bianca feels betrayed by Tiffany's decision and they fall out, but eventually they reconcile and Bianca later tells Tiffany that she is pregnant.

In December 1998, when Tiffany is rushed to hospital after falling down the stairs in The Queen Victoria public house, Bianca accuses Grant of deliberately shoving her down the flight of stairs. This is because Tiffany planned to leave Grant after discovering his affair with her mother Louise (Carol Harrison) and also take custody of Courtney from him. From then onwards Bianca, along with both Tiffany's brother Simon (Andrew Lynford) and her love interret Beppe di Marco (Michael Greco), wishes to see Grant jailed for his poor treatment towards Tiffany and the way it has led to her being hospitalised; Bianca later rows with Grant's mother, Peggy (Barbara Windsor), over the situation as well. On Christmas Day that year, Grant stops Tiffany from seeing their daughter and so Bianca offers to help Tiffany collect Courtney from Grant. Later on Bianca goes to fulfill Tiffany's request and confronts Grant in the pub, arguing with him over the way he has treated Tiffany throughout their marriage. Just then their argument stops when Bianca suddenly goes into labour, and Grant helps Bianca give birth to her baby while his brother Phil (Steve McFadden) goes to fetch Ricky. Afterwards, Bianca and Ricky name their baby Liam while celebrating the birth of their child. However, on New Year's Eve 1998, Bianca is devastated when Tiffany dies after the latter is accidentally run over by Ricky's father Frank (Mike Reid) at the stroke of midnight.

In Summer 1999, Carol reappears and tells Bianca that she is engaged again. Bianca is happy for mother until she learns that Carol's new fiancé is Dan Sullivan (Craig Fairbrass). It soon turns out that Bianca had previously romanced with Dan when she was underage, though Dan was never aware of this fact at the time. Bianca and Dan soon rekindle their affair behind Carol and Ricky's backs, although they end it when Carol discovers she is pregnant by Dan. Just weeks later, Bianca and Ricky plan to move to Manchester so Bianca can attend fashion college there. But disaster strikes when Carol finds an old photo of Bianca and Dan together. Although Dan swears on his unborn child's life that his history with Bianca is all over. Bianca herself confesses to her mother when questioned over the matter; Carol slaps Bianca and disowns her. Bianca then tells Ricky about her affair with Dan, which in turn leads to the couple's break-up. Bianca soon leaves for Manchester, but not before both Ricky and Dan each attempt to join her along the way. Bianca angrily rejects Dan and chooses Ricky. However, when Ricky again tells her to be honest about her feelings for him, Bianca is unable to fully answer and Ricky realizes their relationship is finished for good. Ricky then departs just as Bianca leaves the square on the train.

=== "Ricky & Bianca" and off-screen events (2002–2008) ===
In the two-part special episode, "Ricky & Bianca", Ricky visits Bianca in Manchester in 2002, to discuss Liam. Bianca has been expelled from university and is working in a nightclub. Struggling to support Liam, Bianca gets caught up in a plan to steal £50,000 from her drug-dealing boss, Vince (Craig Charles). Ricky persuades her to return the money but Vince catches them and forces them to become his drug couriers. He sets them up, the dealers turn violent, and Bianca and Ricky narrowly escape when armed police raid the establishment. Fleeing, Ricky and Bianca spend the night together in a hotel room and decide to reunite. Ricky breaks the news to his fiancée Cassie (Sally Ann Triplet), who refuses to let him go, and tries to convince Bianca that she will be bored with Ricky, and to give Ricky custody of Liam. Bianca decides that this is right, and Ricky looks on heartbroken as she hitches a ride in a car and departs for a destination unknown.

Off-screen, unbeknownst to Ricky himself, Bianca is pregnant. She starts a relationship with trucker Nathan Dean, who believes her unborn child is his. Bianca acts as stepmother to Nathan's daughter Whitney (Shona McGarty), but Nathan is killed in a traffic accident. Bianca becomes Whitney's guardian and gives birth to a daughter, Tiffany (Maisie Smith), named after her deceased best friend, but struggles financially. She becomes pregnant again during a brief fling with Ray Dixon (Charles Venn), but it doesn't last long. Bianca soon meets a man named Tony King (Chris Coghill), who supports her through her pregnancy and adopts Ray's son, Morgan Jackson-King (Devon Higgs), when he is born. Tony appears to be a good father figure to her children; however, he is a paedophile who sexually grooms Whitney when she is just 12-years-old and they begin a sexual relationship behind Bianca's back for over three years. After Morgan is born, Liam returns to live with Bianca when Ricky begins dating a woman named Melinda (Siobhan Hayes), who does not like children. Tony and Whitney's abusive relationship continues secretly until Tony is imprisoned for assaulting a boy who propositions Whitney.

=== 2008–2014 ===
In 2008, Bianca is evicted from her home and her children are taken into care. Bianca moves in with her grandmother Pat Evans (Pam St Clement) in Walford and, with Ricky's help, she gets her children back before getting a job as a waitress. She rebuffs Ricky's declaration of love, deciding to stand by imprisoned lover Tony. When he is released, Tony resumes his abuse of Whitney while Bianca wants to set a date for their wedding. He eventually agrees after winding down his affections of Whitney, to whom he is no longer attracted now that she is not a child. Whitney tells Bianca about their relationship, just as she thinks that she and Tony will run away together. There is a massive row and Tony leaves but he is arrested by the police on suspicion of rape of a minor. Bianca and Whitney's relationship is tested while they deal with what has happened but they eventually bond again and Bianca supports Whitney through Tony's trial.

A DNA paternity test confirms that Ricky is Tiffany's father. Bianca slowly realises she is in love with him, but her attempt to rekindle their romance is ruined when Ricky announces his engagement to Peggy's daughter Sam Mitchell (Danniella Westbrook); the latter was also Ricky's ex-wife and Bianca's love rival back in the 1990s. Bianca's quarrel with Sam resurfaces when they fight over Ricky in the pub. Bianca soon learns that Sam is evading a prison sentence for being involves in the murder of the pub's former landlord, Den Watts (Leslie Grantham), back in February 2005. In turn Bianca reports her whereabouts to the police and Sam is arrested. A rift forms between Bianca and Ricky when the truth is revealed. However, Bianca's discovery that Sam is cheating on Ricky ends the engagement; Ricky reunites with Bianca in the aftermath. Ricky and Bianca soon remarry after he accepts her marriage proposal. During the ceremony, Carol arrives and brawls with Bianca until they slowly settle their differences. A few months later, Bianca is devastated when her youngest brother Billie dies from alcohol poisoning; she informs Carol, who is distraught over his death. Carol is later comforted by Billie's friend, Connor Stanley (Arinze Kene), and they begin an affair just as Connor starts dating Whitney at the same time. When Bianca discovers the betrayal, she vows to remove Connor from her family's life and attacks Connor; this leaves him hospitalised and she eventually turns herself in to the police, refusing bail. Bianca is sentenced to six months imprisonment, but is released just in time for Christmas. Bianca is soon devastated when Pat dies from pancreatic cancer on New Year's Day 2012. When Bianca discovers Ricky had slept with Mandy Salter (Nicola Stapleton) in her absence, they separate and he leaves Walford. Bianca struggles as a single parent and gets into debt. She soon steals from a market trader in desperation, but is caught and ends up getting sent back to jail. In prison, she passes a hair and beauty course. Thereafter she is offered a trial at the salon owned by her aunt, Tanya Branning (Jo Joyner). However, as time goes on, Bianca struggles to cope and breaks down when she is alone.

Soon enough, Bianca starts a close friendship with local resident Kat Moon (Jessie Wallace) when they set up a market stall together. Liam plays truant from school and Bianca worries when the police tell her she may face prison again if Liam does not return. Bianca discovers that Liam is involved in a mugging and that he has some dubious new friends. When Liam does not come home, she goes to an estate to confront the gang and collect Liam but he decides to stay with the gang and when he does come home, Bianca locks him in his room to stop him seeing the gang. She seeks advice from Ava Hartman (Clare Perkins), an acquaintance whose son Dexter (Khali Best) used to be in a gang. Liam is soon lured back into the gang, which leads to him getting arrested and then released on police bail when the gang is caught. They blame Liam and he is stabbed but is not seriously injured. When Bianca lets Liam stay at home alone, Kane sneaks in and invites Liam back to the gang. Bianca finds them as Kane is threatening Liam and attacks Kane; he is arrested. Bianca allows Liam to stay with his father. It is then Bianca, along with Kat's relative Jean Slater (Gillian Wright) and their friend, Shirley Carter (Linda Henry), break into Ian's restaurant sometime later and Shirley ends up starting a fire by accident; Bianca worries that she could go back to prison for it and tells Whitney, who has been blamed for the incident. Jean eventually tells Ian what happened and Ian agrees not to involve the police on the condition that Tiffany and Ian's son Bobby (Rory Stroud) are no longer friends.

When Carol sees that Bianca is still interested in fashion, she arranges for her to attend a course in Manchester. When Bianca returns, she surprises her family by introducing them to her new love interest Terry Spraggan (Terry Alderton); she later invites Terry along with his children, TJ (George Sargeant) and Rosie (Jerzey Swingler), to move in with her at the house. Bianca is devastated when she finds out that Carol has been diagnosed with breast cancer. Bianca, upon learning that she has not inherited Carol's faulty cancer gene, supports her mother throughout her cancer and is shocked when the latter gets engaged to David; as he had recently resurfaced in the square and moved in the home. However, Bianca is disheartened when David jilts Carol and leaves the Square again.

By then, Terry's old spouse, Nikki Spraggan (Rachel Wilde) has arrived on the square. Bianca's jealousy over Nikki leads to her breaking up with Terry in public, but he soon continues to date Bianca in secret before telling her that he plans to move out of London. Terry and Bianca reunite, and at the last minute, Bianca gives Liam and Whitney her blessing to stay with Carol before taking Tiffany and Morgan to live in Milton Keynes.

The following year, Robbie moves with his son, Sami Jackson (Shiven Shankar) to Milton Keynes near Bianca. A few years later Bianca is invited to Whitney's wedding to Shirley's grandson, Lee Carter (Danny Hatchard), but she cannot attend; both Tiffany and Morgan arrive instead. Whitney later visits Bianca after her engagement to new lover Woody Woodward (Lee Ryan) collapses beyond repair. Months later, Bianca is informed that her cousin, Abi Branning (Lorna Fitzgerald) has died, but cannot attend the funeral. When Tiffany returns to Walford, she reveals that Bianca has tried to kill herself – though this turns out to be false when Tiffany confesses to lying after feeling neglected by Bianca and Terry; In turn Bianca agrees to Tiffany living with Whitney. When Tiffany becomes involved in a drug ring the following year, Sonia informs Bianca, who is unable to return to help out.

=== 2019 ===
In 2019, Bianca returns to Walford for Whitney's wedding to Callum Highway (Tony Clay). She first wakes up in a police cell with Kat after a night out. Bianca mentions she has recently been released from prison once again. When Phil's son, Ben Mitchell (Max Bowden) arrives at the venue and reveals to Bianca about his affair with Callum, she threatens him and then tries to discourage Whitney from marrying Callum. Whilst at the wedding reception, Bianca witnesses a man giving Tiffany a kiss on the cheek and threatens him to stay away. She attempts to make amends with Tiffany, who is upset with Bianca because of her absence and ignoring her daughter for Terry's children. Bianca later reveals to Tiffany that she was arrested and released with an electronic tag which prevented her from returning. When Bianca sees Whitney getting drunk at The Queen Vic, she suggests that she attends her honeymoon alone to take her mind off Callum. Bianca then arranges a spa day with Tiffany, and when she sees the man from the wedding again, she threatens him to stay away. It is soon revealed that the man is actually Tony's son, Leo King (Tom Wells), who blames Whitney for Tony's death. He soon informs Bianca that she inherited his grandmother's money and threatens to hurt her family unless she gives him the money. However, Bianca refuses and leaves the square with Tiffany for a holiday after spending time with Sonia and Robbie. Bianca later returns off-screen to console Whitney after she learns Leo, who she has been dating, is Tony's son and that she killed him in self-defence. Bianca and Carol both visit Tiffany in Germany in December 2022, leaving them unable to attend the funeral of her step-grandmother, Dot Branning (June Brown).

=== 2024–2025 ===
In January 2024, during a phone call with Whitney, Bianca tells her that she and Terry have split up. Whitney and her boyfriend, Zack Hudson (James Farrar) go to visit Bianca the following month where Whitney reveals her pregnancy to her. Bianca and Whitney discuss the miscarriages of their respective daughters, Natasha and Peach when having a catch-up together. Bianca also has been at loggerheads with her neighbour, Keeley Wainwright (Kirsty J. Curtis) upon looking after neglected children, Britney (Lola Campbell) and Taylor Wainwright (Mason Godfrey), to the point of feeding them on regular occasions. Whitney confronts Keeley over abandoning her children, leading to a confrontation between Bianca and Keeley when she taunts her about Terry. In that moment Whitney tries to pursue Britney when she flees and saves her by pushing her out of an incoming car, which results in Whitney getting run over; Whitney decides to remain in Milton Keynes with Bianca for a while. Bianca soon returns to Walford not long afterwards to support Whitney after she argues with Zack. Later on, Bianca gets acquainted with newly arrived, Junior Knight (Micah Balfour); they have sex but Bianca is unaware that he is married. She soon discovers that Zack has cheated on Whitney by sleeping with her best friend and Bianca's cousin, Lauren Branning (Jacqueline Jossa). After confronting Zack over his betrayal, Bianca reluctantly agrees to keep this a secret; however, Britney also discovers the truth on the day Whitney gives birth to her and Zack's child, Dolly Dean-Hudson. On the following week, Britney exposes Zack's betrayal during his wedding to Whitney. In the aftermath Whitney turns to Bianca for support, but then finds out that Bianca knew about Zack's betrayal before she did; Whitney declares that she can't trust Bianca anymore and decides to leave the square. The following day, Whitney leaves the square with both Dolly and Britney; their departure leaves both Bianca and Zack devastated.

Following Whitney's departure, Bianca later has a heart-to-heart with Kat and reveals that she has been suffering from depression. Bianca soon begins living with Sonia at her house but grows distrustful of Sonia's boyfriend, Reiss Colwell (Jonny Freeman) after meeting him. Reiss later urges Sonia to evict Bianca, but this changes when Sonia discovers that she has suffered from a blighted ovum and Bianca stays to support her. Bianca then discovers that Reiss has been using the money of his wife Debbie (Jenny Meier), who is unresponsive from a stroke, to pay for his and Sonia's IVF treatment; Bianca demands that he confess to Sonia, but is left upset when Sonia forgives Reiss for his secret. Bianca has an argument with Sonia in public and leaves the square in tears.

A few months later, after Debbie dies, Bianca returns in the middle of Debbie's wake at the pub and begins verbally attacking Reiss after learning Sonia is on remand for Debbie's murder. She relentlessly hounds Reiss, prompting him to flee. Bianca continues her quest for a confession and throws a brick at Reiss' car in frustration. Bianca later drunkenly kisses Sonia's former husband, Martin Fowler (James Bye) during a heart to heart with him, but instantly regrets it. Bianca is later reunited with David when he returns to help her out after Kat informs him about the situation. After tensions erupt between them, Bianca confides in David about her depression and they ultimately reconcile. David later wishes for Bianca to leave the square with him; she declines in order to exonerate Sonia but nevertheless parts ways with her father on good terms. After Reiss returns after a few weeks in Peterborough, Bianca finds out through CCTV footage from Teddy Mitchell (Roland Manookian) that he was at the care home the night Debbie died. She confronts him and he misleads Bianca into following him to his rehearsal studio to collect the pillow he used to suffocate Debbie, and then hand himself in. Reiss later attacks Bianca, causing her to hit him over the head with a candlestick. It is then revealed that Reiss has taken Bianca hostage.

Two months later in January 2025, Bianca is still being held hostage by Reiss and during the week of Sonia's trial she makes multiple attempts to escape but fails; after learning Sonia is going to plead guilty she convinces Reiss to let her record a false confession saying she murdered Debbie in order to let Sonia be released and for herself to go on the run, as well as telling Reiss she will not go to the police about him. However, after Bianca's confession is shown to the court, Reiss is told it will take a few months for the CPS to process the video. Sonia is released but Reiss decides to keep Bianca hostage. Soon after the CPS accept Bianca's confession and a warrant is sent out for her arrest. Reiss refuses to allow Bianca flee and tries to encourage her to commit suicide by providing her with painkillers. When Reiss visits Bianca to see if she is still alive, he forgets to lock the doors of the storage unit. Bianca manages to escape after grabbing bolt cutters that he accidentally leaves behind. Just as Reiss attempts to hold Sonia hostage when the truth is revealed, Bianca hits him over the head with a teapot. They run to their uncle Jack Branning (Scott Maslen) for help, but when they return to the house, Reiss has escaped. During the wedding of Billy (Perry Fenwick) and Honey Mitchell (Emma Barton) the next day, Reiss accidentally crashes into The Queen Vic and a fire erupts and causes the pub to explode. Sonia and Lauren are trapped in the rubble and with the help of Grant, who she recently got reacquainted with a few hours ago, Bianca manages to find them just as Sonia's waters break. Reiss follows Bianca to see Sonia and following a confrontation, Bianca pushes him and he falls into the debris. A bath falls through the floor and hits Reiss, killing him instantly; Bianca and Lauren help Sonia to deliver her daughter Julia Fowler. In the aftermath of the explosion, Bianca becomes agoraphobic due to the trauma of the kidnapping, resulting in tensions arising between her and a stressed Sonia; the two later reconcile with the help of Kojo Asare (Dayo Koleosho).

Bianca is approached by a woman named Charlotte (Leonie Elliott) to appear on her true crime podcast to tell her ordeal with Reiss. Bianca agrees but later changes her mind, however, it is too late. Despite Bianca's attempts to keep this hidden from Sonia, the story goes viral on social media. They are disturbed by true crime fans, and Sonia discovers the truth. After a heated argument, Sonia kicks Bianca out, but they reconcile. Sonia's long-lost father Terry Cant (Glen Davies) arrives after listening to the podcast, immediately clashing with Bianca when she tries to prevent him from seeing Sonia due to his abusive past. Sonia agrees to follow Terry to Bali so she can leave Walford, but when Bianca refuses to allow her to go, Terry turns violent. Bianca reveals this to Sonia, who later witnesses Terry's true colours. Sonia and her daughter Bex (Jasmine Armfield) still decide to go to Bali without Terry and invite Bianca. Bianca leaps at the chance and leaves Walford once again with Sonia, Bex, and Julia. In November 2026, Jack sends his daughter Amy Mitchell (Ellie Dadd) to stay with Bianca and Sonia in Norfolk, following her ordeal with Craig Ingram (Matthew James-Bailey).

== Reception ==
=== Awards and nominations ===
Palmer's portrayal of Bianca earned her a nomination for "Best Actress" at the 1997 Royal Television Society Awards – being the first soap actress to ever be nominated – and in 2000 she was awarded "Best Actress" at The British Soap Awards, a prize voted for by viewers. She commented on her role in her acceptance speech: "It's completely changed my life. It just turned it around. I have had my ups and downs as you all know. I just want to warn all the young people. Be careful because it really does change your life." The role has also garnered Palmer nominations as "Most Popular Actress" at the 1996 National Television Awards, "Best Actress" at the 1999 British Soap Awards, "TV Soap Personality" at the 2009 Television and Radio Industries Club Awards, "Best On-Screen Partnership" (with Sid Owen) in the 2001 British Soap Awards, and "I'm a Survivor" at the 2009 All About Soap Bubble Awards. Palmer was also longlisted for "Best Comic Performance" at the 2025 Inside Soap Awards.

=== Critical response ===
The character of Bianca Jackson has received critical acclaim from critics and fans alike. EastEnders' executive producers Diederick Santer and Jon Sen have described Bianca as "one of the most popular characters EastEnders has ever had", and an "iconic creation", respectively. James Rampton, journalist for The Independent, has commented that she is "adored". Palmer has suggested that viewers "rooted" for Bianca because "people love a stroppy girl". In 2000, she commented, "[Bianca] makes them laugh. A character like that is about living out your fantasies. Everybody would love to be like Bianca and really say what they think." Following her exit from the serial in September 1999, Palmer said that members of the public would approach her to plead with her to return to EastEnders, as they missed her character and relationship with Ricky. She commented in 2000, "It makes me feel bad. I sometimes think I should go back [to EastEnders] for everyone else's sake." When the character departed the serial in 1999, Molly Blake of the Birmingham Evening Post said "Good riddance!" She described Bianca as a "king-sized pain in the backside [...] A screeching and screaming virago with a big mouth and pea-sized brain" and a "prize slapper [who] tormented all those whose paths [she] crossed."

In 1995, Chris Barker carried out television research on post-transmission perspectives of British Asian teenage viewers of EastEnders, using the character Bianca as one of the focus points. He discovered that the participants were both active and implicit in the reproduction of ideology about family relationships and gender. The males regarded Bianca as a "saucy cow", with implications of unacceptable assertiveness in women. They disliked that Ricky was pushed around by Bianca and treated as a subordinate by her friends. The author comments that "such a relationship appears to these boys as the world turned upside down." Girls also viewed Bianca unfavourably in 1995, and the author noted that tensions in "girl-culture" – attraction to the traditional private world of interpersonal relationships and the desire to take up more assertive characteristics in public – manifested themselves in discussions about Bianca and her friend Natalie Price. Natalie was constructed as a "nice person" in contrast to Bianca, "she can relate to Ricky [...] cares for other people and doesn't just think about herself [like Bianca does]", qualities that were said to be constitutive of the traditional identity of women.

"Previous returns have been all about the numbers and not about the story, which is the cardinal sin in this game. While there is, of course, the resultant publicity that comes with any new or returning soap character being announced, the storyline possibilities for Ricky and Bianca arriving back in the Square are good. [...] All very well thought through and positive. This sounds like a soap getting back in touch with its roots".

— Mark Wright of The Stage on Ricky and Bianca's 2008 return

In 2008, when it was announced that both Ricky and Bianca were being reintroduced, Santer described them as "a hugely popular and well-loved partnership on the show", and Reuters branded them two of "the most popular characters on the soap". However, Hazel Davis of The Guardian was critical about their reintroduction. She commented, "It's a no-brainer on the show's part. Last year, ratings for EastEnders were at an all-time low. But, just for once, wouldn't it be nice if a soap opera actually introduced new characters with verve and staying power rather than digging up the oldies?" Conversely, Mark Wright from The Stage said that the decision to bring these much-loved character back "is very welcome". Ruth Deller of entertainment website Lowculture praised Bianca stating: "Bianca and Ricky's return has been one of the best things about [EastEnders] in the past year [...] and even when Bianca and co don't have storylines as big as the Whitney/Tony one, they still give good telly."

In March 2010, Bianca was voted the 'Most Popular TV Mum' in an online poll conducted by Yahoo!, gaining 26% of votes. Yahoo!'s TV editor Paul Johnston commented "As loud and garish as Bianca can be, she also has a huge heart when it comes to her children and would do anything to protect them. You certainly wouldn't want her turning up on your doorstep if your kids had been fighting with hers!"

In 2020, Sara Wallis and Ian Hyland from The Daily Mirror placed Bianca 29th on their ranked list of the best EastEnders characters of all time, calling her a "Flame-haired, fiery-tempered market stall holder" who was most famous for "having affairs", moving to Manchester and Milton Keynes and shouting Ricky's name. In 2021, Angie Quinn from MyLondon called Bianca one of the "icons who are no longer on the square".

== In popular culture and other media ==
In 1999, BBC Books published a book about the character, entitled Bianca's Secret Diary. The paperback details the affair between Bianca and her mother Carol's lover, Dan. A BBC source reportedly told the Sunday Mirror: "We've recently dethroned Coronation Street at the top of the viewing charts, and this book has the potential to make No.1 in the best-sellers list." It was released on 10 September 1999, just as the TV storyline reached its conclusion.

The character was spoofed in the BBC comedy sketch show The Real McCoy. One of the show's recurring sketches featured a spoof version of EastEnders, with black comedians taking over roles of well known EastEnders characters, who frequent a pub called Rub-a-Dub. Actress and comedian Judith Jacob played the role of Bianca in the sketches. Jacob had previously appeared as a regular character in EastEnders between 1986 and 1989, as health visitor Carmel Jackson (unrelated to Bianca's family).
