= Louise Raymond =

Fictional character from the BBC soap opera EastEnders

- EastEnders character
- Portrayed by: Carol Harrison
- Duration: 1998–1999
- First appearance: Episode 1613; 12 May 1998
- Last appearance: Episode 1769; 27 April 1999
- Introduced by: Mike Hudson
In-universe information
- Occupation: Shop manageress
- Husband: Terry Raymond (until 1998)
- Sons: Simon Raymond
- Daughters: Tiffany Mitchell
- Granddaughters: Courtney Mitchell

Louise Raymond is a fictional character from the BBC soap opera EastEnders, played by Carol Harrison from May 1998 to April 1999. Louise is the estranged mother of the characters Tiffany and Simon Raymond (Martine McCutcheon and Andrew Lynford). She is featured most prominently in a high-profile storyline about adultery, when she has sex with her daughter's husband Grant Mitchell (Ross Kemp). The plot is the catalyst for the eventual death of Tiffany, who dies in the aftermath upon discovering the affair. Harrison left the role in 1999; scriptwriters allegedly felt that the character had nowhere left to go following Tiffany's departure.

== Creation and development ==
Louise was introduced in May 1998 as the estranged wife of Terry Raymond (Gavin Richards) and mother of Tiffany Mitchell (Martine McCutcheon) and Simon Raymond (Andrew Lynford). Her first scene is a shock climax during the wedding of Terry and Irene Hills (Roberta Taylor), when Louise stops the ceremony announcing that she and Terry are still married. Actress Carol Harrison was given the role and was told by producers that they planned to put her character "through the wringer storyline-wise". Harison has described Louise as "a very strong and resilient but deep down she has a very vulnerable streak [...] there are two sides to her. She is a lot of fun but she carries a lot of pain. Louise is a woman of the world who has had very high highs and very low lows. She is also a woman who sees people's flaws and accepts them without judgment."

Louise entered the serial with an extensive backstory, having abandoned her children with their abusive, alcoholic father. Discussing the character, Harrison commented:"[Louise's] made some horrendous mistakes. She walked out on them when they were very young, for a start. But she was trapped in an extremely bad marriage-completely, totally trapped. She was desperately unhappy, she was being physically abused by Terry and ultimately lost all confidence in herself and her ability to look after the kids so she scarpered. She's got enormous guilt because of that, of course, even though she re-entered their lives and has become quite close to them again, especially 'Tiff'. That feeling of guilt hasn't gone away. Not really. How could it? When I took the role on I was very concerned that the viewers would just loathe "Louise" for what she'd done and find it hard to accept her much less like her when she finally appeared in the flesh. Thank God I was wrong."

One of the most high-profile storylines featuring Louise was her affair with her daughter's husband Grant (Ross Kemp). Louise was shown to give in to temptation and sleep with Grant in an hour-long special, airing in September on a Sunday evening, deviating from the typical weekly broadcasting time and schedule of EastEnders. Discussing the storyline, a BBC source claimed "Louise has come back to the Square to make it up to Tiffany and Simon, whom she walked out on when they were kids. But she knows that a relationship with Grant is hardly the behaviour of a mother who is seeking forgiveness from her children." The storyline was part of executive producer Matthew Robinson's attempt to win ratings amidst competition from rival soap Coronation Street. The hour-long special aired at the same time as the ITV network aired Coronation Street; at that time, in EastEnders' 13-year run, it was only the second time the two soaps had gone head-to-head. Executive producer Matthew Robinson said: "If most of the nation isn't talking about what's happening in EastEnders on Monday, I will be surprised. Come December, if the whole nation isn't hooked, I will be amazed."

Harrison has given her interpretation of why Louise and Grant were attracted to each other: "They're both damaged goods, she and Grant - and damaged souls. Him because of his childhood upbringing at the hands of an abusive dad as well as his Falklands experience. And her because of [her abusive marriage]. Both of them are quite profoundly damaged. They find themselves in each other's orbits and are drawn to each other like moths to a flame - they're helplessly drawn to each other. It certainly wasn't a malicious alliance intended to hurt anyone. And yeah, it may have seemed on the surface to be a perfect soap melodrama triangle - woman sleeping with her daughter's husband - but I told the producers I wanted this storyline to be sensational, not sensationalistic, and I think by and large we succeeded [...] it was grounded in a psychological semblance to reality, really. It was like a self-fulfilling prophecy to Louise, I think, sleeping with Grant. She believed herself to be a bad person - a bad mother. He was all of a sudden there in front of her. And so she made that awful, awful mistake [and slept with him]."

The culmination of the storyline aired in December 1998, when after discovering her mother and Grant's affair, Tiffany is accidentally killed in a car accident during a fight with Grant. Simon also suffers a mental breakdown upon discovering his mother's betrayal and Louise is shunned by the community. Carol Harrison announced she was leaving EastEnders in November 1998. A source told the Sunday Mirror, "After Tiffany's death the scriptwriters don't feel they can do much more with Louise. She'd rather leave than end up on the sidelines talking about the weather in Walford." Louise's exit scene aired in April 1999. However, Harrison said that she would be open to a return, stating "never say never".

== Storylines ==
Louise arrives in Albert Square in May 1998, just in time to halt the proceedings of her husband Terry (Gavin Richards)'s marriage to Irene Hills (Roberta Taylor). Although their marriage had ended in separation many years ago, Terry is still legally married to Louise and had refused to grant her a divorce in order to get out of paying the settlement.

Louise had left both her children, in their teens, in the custody of their drunken and abusive father; she had subsequently had no contact with either. Both Tiffany and Simon find it difficult to cope with their mother's sudden reemergence, but Louise manages to win them round. After reuniting with her children, Louise decides to move to Walford, mainly to support Tiffany, who is going through a traumatic time after the break-up of her marriage to Grant Mitchell (Ross Kemp).

Louise seems to dislike Grant initially; she tries to convince Tiffany not to go back to him. Grant is desperate to save his marriage in order to remain close to his daughter, Courtney, and realising the influence Louise has, he makes a deliberate effort to woo Louise. Over subsequent meetings, it becomes evident that Grant and Louise are attracted to each other and Grant regularly makes advances on Louise. Louise initially denies her feelings, embarking on a fling with Gianni di Marco (Marc Bannerman) to put Grant off. However, on the night of her 40th birthday, the inevitable happens and Grant and Louise have sex. The next day, Louise is wracked with guilt, which is compounded by the fact that Tiffany has decided that she wants to reunite with Grant. In order to spare her daughter's feelings, Louise keeps the affair secret.

Louise is attacked in November of that year and it is Grant who comes to her rescue, which nearly leads to them having sex a second time, stopped only by Simon's unexpected appearance. Panicking, Grant declines to tell Tiffany about Louise's attack, fearing that Louise will be more likely to confess their affair in her emotional state. When Louise finds out that Grant has attempted to keep her daughter away from her, she goes round to The Queen Victoria public house to confront him, accusing him of using her for sex. However, a distraught Tiffany hears their entire conversation over the baby monitor.

Upon realising that her mother has betrayed her with her husband, Tiffany decides to flee Walford. Moments before she is about to depart, Grant accosts her and an argument culminates in Tiffany falling down the stairs and being hospitalised. After Tiffany recovers, she refuses to have anything more to do with Louise. After setting Grant up as the perpetrator of her accidental fall, she tries to leave Walford again but is run-over and killed by Frank Butcher (Mike Reid) on New Year's Eve 1998 before she can leave. On the day of her funeral, Tiffany's best friend, Bianca Jackson (Patsy Palmer), discovers a letter from Tiffany explaining Louise's betrayal, upon which Bianca furiously threatens to tell Simon what Louise has been up to unless she leaves Walford. Louise flees in January 1999, leaving her son distraught.

Later that year, Louise returns following Simon's mental breakdown. Frightened that Bianca will get there first, Louise divulges her affair with Grant to Simon. This news only worsens Simon's mental state; he sets fire to his flat, causing himself burns. Simon decides to leave Walford soon after his recovery, and despite initial hostility, he and Louise part on good terms. After another trivial dalliance with Gianni and more squabbling with Terry, Louise decides to leave Walford too in April 1999 to live with Simon and Tony.
