= Simon Raymond =

Fictional character from the BBC soap opera EastEnders

- EastEnders character
- Portrayed by: Andrew Lynford
- Duration: 1996–1999
- First appearance: Episode 1298; 4 June 1996
- Last appearance: Episode 1764; 15 April 1999
In-universe information
- Occupation: Market trader
- Father: Terry Raymond
- Mother: Louise Raymond
- Stepmother: Irene Raymond
- Sisters: Tiffany Mitchell
- Nieces: Courtney Mitchell

Simon Raymond is a fictional character from the BBC soap opera EastEnders, played by Andrew Lynford. Simon is introduced in 1996 as the homosexual brother of Tiffany Mitchell (Martine McCutcheon). His relationship with the bisexual character Tony Hills (Mark Homer) featured a gay kiss that caused controversy in the UK; numerous complaints were made because of its broadcasting. Simon remained in the serial until 1999, at which time it was mutually agreed between Lynford and executive producer Matthew Robinson, that the character had run its course. The character was given a happy ending, reuniting with his former boyfriend Tony to travel Europe.

== Development ==
Lynford has suggested that he and the writers of EastEnders intended to portray Simon as a "perfectly normal" young gay man who would entertain and educate and for whom sexuality was "no big deal".

Lynford described Tony and Simon's storylines as "not just focused on their orientation and about acceptance. There were issues that could have been directed at any couple struggling to survive life in a small community within a large city. It was about 'life' and the best way to live it."

Early in 1999, Simon was featured in a storyline depicting his fragile mental health, resulting from the death of his sister in the serial. This featured a storyline where he kidnapped his sister's daughter. According to Lynford, the storyline was used to address the difficulties of coping with bereavement. Lynford said, "[It was] a very strong image about family values from a gay point of view: Simon the homosexual was not destroying the family unit, but literally clinging on to the last fragment of stability within the family he had, having lost his sister, and maintaining no relationships with either his mother or father. All Simon was looking for was a constant and nurturing home life. At that time, his young niece was the only chance he had of developing that, particularly as Tony was still dabbling with girls around that time."

It was announced in December 1998 that Simon would be leaving the serial in 1999. Actor Andrew Lynford reportedly decided to leave the soap by mutual agreement with executive producer Matthew Robinson. It was also announced that Simon's former boyfriend Tony (Homer) would also be written out. A spokesperson said, "They have mutually agreed that both characters have fulfilled their potential and will conclude their stories with a dramatic exit". In the storyline, Simon and Tony reunited and left to travel the world, which according to Lynford, was an ending that was decided upon by himself, Homer and the producers at the time. Discussing his stint in the serial in 2003, Lynford said, "I really enjoyed working there as everyone was great to work with, making it one big happy family. I knew when it was time to move on though, and it is a job I look back on with great affection."

== Storylines ==
Simon arrives in Walford in 1996 when he comes in search of his sister Tiffany (Martine McCutcheon), after his abusive relationship with his partner, Howard (Dorian Lough), collapsed. Their father Terry (Gavin Richards) is an abusive alcoholic, while their mother Louise (Carol Harrison) had abandoned them when they were young.

Simon becomes close to Tiffany's boyfriend Tony Hills (Mark Homer), who had earlier been secretly confused about his sexuality, but decided not to act on his feelings after he fell in love with Tiffany. However, while on a trip to Blackpool, Tony is unable to control his urges any longer and kisses Simon. Simon wrestles over whether to tell his sister what has happened, but when Tony claims it meant nothing, he keeps quiet, although he spends a lot of time trying to convince Tony to confront his demons.

Simon eventually gets to the point where he has had enough of Tony's denials and unpleasantness and so he decides to leave. That night, after having packed his bags earlier in the day, Simon tells Tony of his intentions, and in response Tony begs him to stay. Simon demands to be given a very good reason why he should do so. Then follows a torturous discussion during which Tony eventually admits his homosexuality and his love for Simon, after which they cuddle and kiss. Tiffany (who is pregnant at the time) comes home, discovers them kissing, and flees the house hysterically with Tony and Simon running after her. Tiffany finds it difficult to forgive her brother but they eventually reconcile when Tiffany settles down with Grant Mitchell (Ross Kemp).

Simon and Tony stay together for a while, and Simon even reconciles with his father and mother, who both appear in Walford in search of their children. Simon initially works on Sanjay Kapoor (Deepak Verma)'s market stall selling clothes, then later for his sister's best friend Bianca Jackson (Patsy Palmer). Simon's idyll is shattered, however, when he finds out that Tony had sex with the female singer Frankie Pierre (Sian Blake), as well as his colleague, the reporter Polly Becker (Victoria Gould). Angry and devastated, Simon ends the relationship.

An old friend from Manchester, Jonathan, gets in touch when he is helping another friend, Chris Clarke (Matthew Jay Lewis), move down to London. Although Simon initially thinks they are a couple, it becomes clear that Chris is taking a shine to Simon, with some not so subtle flirting. After breaking up with Tony, Simon immediately starts seeing Chris, even though Chris wants and 'open' relationship with freedom to see other people. Initially this seems to be a relationship which may work, but based on previous experiences Simon starts to read more into Chris' clubbing and friendships with old boyfriends and he starts to become jealous. It is while he and Chris are on holiday with Tony and some other Walford residents, that Simon and Tony realise that they still have feelings for each other. The main reason for the holiday is for Simon and Chris to sort out their relationship. They do: Simon ends it as he doesn't love Chris.

When Tiffany is killed in a car accident on New Year's Eve 1998, Simon has a nervous breakdown and blames Tiffany's husband Grant for her death. This culminates in Simon abducting his sister's baby, Courtney, and taking her to Peacehaven, where he stands by the edge of a cliff and threatens to jump with Courtney. After much abusive ranting, Grant and Tony persuade Simon to hand Courtney back and Simon is taken home to recover. His mental health only deteriorates, however, when he discovers that his mother had been having sex with Grant behind his sister's back (which led up to the events of her death that same year). Distraught, Simon accidentally sets fire to his mother's flat while he is trapped inside. Simon is badly burned and is taken to hospital to recover.

Upon his return, Tony decides that Simon is the man for him and Simon accepts the fact that Tony is not gay but bisexual. When Tony leaves Walford to travel around Europe, Simon goes with him. His last appearance is in 1999.

== Reception ==
In 1996, a gay kiss between Simon and his sister's boyfriend Tony was aired in EastEnders. The clip was shown before the 9pm watershed and it was edited down from 2 seconds to half a second because it was felt there would be viewers who would not be expecting to see that "kind of material at that time" and the BBC did not want to "startle" viewers. Nevertheless, the broadcast of the gay kiss evoked numerous complaints from viewers to the BBC. A BBC spokesperson said, "It's true to say it has caused considerable reaction." Lynford has opined that the decision to cut the kissing scene by a second or two broke its rhythm, and he suggested that the producers of the soap opera were disappointed that the BBC bosses ordered the scene to be cut. He has commented, "The producers on the show at the time were disappointed the powers-that-were took the decision to cut the kiss down. At the time we felt it was shying away from the journey the two characters were taking." However, Lynford has said that in hindsight, it made little difference to the scene's impact, which he described as "astounding". He added, "Government ministers and even the Church of England took to commenting on that episode and its content."

Author Margaret Llewellyn-Jones has suggested that Simon and Tony were two of the "straight-est-looking gay boys in London". She suggested that they were not convincing to the gay audience, which she argued was because "the gayness of the characters was 'clawed-back' and that the readers of the image who see them as unconvincing use a queer reading practice. The two gay characters are signified within codes of recognition that are available to the central reader. To the queer reader they can be seen clearly as a rather dubious construction - they are a carbon copy of a 'straight' relationship where only the object of desire is different, rather than a relationship that signs itself as different. To a queer reader the gay relationship in this instance says nothing to them other than a representation of a straight relationship, what it does show is the implicit constructedness of all of the relationships present in a soap's fabric."

According to Lynford, Simon was branded "dull and boring and not fun and up beat like all gay men" by the British press. Lynford has suggested that Simon and Tony's love storyline was compared unfavourably to the more sensational depiction of gay men in Channel 4's Queer as Folk. Lynford commented on this and defended his character's storylines: "Queer as Folk aired on Channel Four. The show was well crafted as a means to shock and cause outrage by showing elements of the life led by some men in the gay community. The Tony and Simon storyline in EastEnders never set out to do that. At the time, there were champions of Queer as Folk taking the line of 'at last, real gay men on telly! Not like those two boring poofs on EastEnders'. It was amusing to me at some level and saddened me at another. We were broadcast at 7:30 p.m., aimed at prime time 'family' viewing and Queer as Folk was 10 p.m. on Channel Four, a channel in the U.K. renowned for its controversial programming. We were unable to compete, not that we ever felt we had to or wanted to. It was also around this time that the stories for Simon were becoming more dramatic and, as I have said previously, removed from anything purely tokenistic."

Simon and Tony's departures in 1999 left only one gay character in the UK's mainstream soap operas at the time, that of Zoe Tate in Emmerdale. Gay campaigning group Stonewall's spokesman Matt Aston commented on this, saying: "Gay characters did seem to be on the rise for a while, but now they've got a bit of a low profile. We'd like to see a few more positive role models in the media, especially to encourage young people who are coming to terms with their sexuality, as well as their friends and members of their family."

== See also ==
- List of LGBT characters in television and radio
