= Tiffany Mitchell (EastEnders) =

Fictional character from the BBC soap opera EastEnders

- EastEnders character
- Portrayed by: Martine McCutcheon
- Duration: 1995–1999
- First appearance: Episode 1084; 24 January 1995
- Last appearance: Episode 1719; 4 January 1999
- Created by: Tony Jordan
- Introduced by: Barbara Emile
- Book appearances: Blood Ties: The Life and Loves of Grant Mitchell; Tiffany's Secret Diary
In-universe information
- Occupation: Barmaid
- Family: Mitchell
- Father: Terry Raymond
- Mother: Louise Raymond
- Stepmother: Irene Raymond
- Brothers: Simon Raymond
- Husband: Grant Mitchell (1996–1999)
- Daughters: Courtney Mitchell

Tiffany Mitchell (nee Raymond) is a fictional character from the BBC soap opera EastEnders, played by Martine McCutcheon from 1995 until 1999. The character was created by writer Tony Jordan. She was introduced as a school friend of Bianca Jackson (Patsy Palmer) in January 1995.

In 1996, after getting herself a job as barmaid of the soap's pub, The Queen Victoria, Tiffany got pregnant by former pub landlord Grant Mitchell (Ross Kemp). They later started a relationship and got married, having a daughter called Courtney. However, the relationship suffered a lot due to Grant's constant mistreatment of Tiffany. The final blow occurred towards the end of 1998 when Grant had an affair with Tiffany's mother, Louise Raymond (Carol Harrison).

Tiffany was a prominent and popular character during her tenure. At the end of 1997, McCutcheon announced she would be quitting the role in order to pursue a musical career. Producers made the controversial decision to kill the character off, an act that McCutcheon publicly criticised as she had hoped to return at some stage. A book released in December 1998, documenting Tiffany's time in the soap, was a number-one bestseller.

== Creation and development ==
=== Introduction ===
Introduced in 1995 by series producer Barbara Emile, Tiffany Raymond was conceptualised by EastEnders' scriptwriter Tony Jordan as a school friend of already established character Bianca Jackson (Patsy Palmer). Actress Martine McCutcheon was cast in the role. McCutcheon has revealed that she was initially hesitant about auditioning for the part, commenting to The Guardian, "An agent called me and said there was a part on EastEnders and I said, very offhandedly, 'I don't really want to do soap, because I want to do movies, and nobody I know goes from soap to movies, and it's just not the sort of actress I want to be [...] this agent said to me, just let me send you a synopsis of the character and see what you think, and I thought she was fantastic. And I watched EastEnders that night and I realised just how many people talked about it. So I told my agent, 'All right, I'm going to go for it, I'm not in a position to be fussy".

=== Casting ===
In Larry Jaffee's book, Albert Square & Me: The Actors of Eastenders, McCutcheon discussed the auditioning process at the BBC in December 1994, saying that the casting directors liked the way she read, but did not feel that her dress sense tallied with their vision of Tiffany. They asked her to return in a few days dressed like their vision, in "flashy clothes and junk jewelry" and showing a "bit of cleavage". McCutcheon attended "gangster clubs" to research the type of clothing worn by women that frequented them. She returned to the BBC wearing fishnet stockings, a tight lycra skirt, junk jewelry, orange lipstick and fake tan. She was told that her look was "perfect" and several days later she was informed that she had been given the role.

McCutcheon's final competitor for the role of Tiffany was actress Claire Goose, who later appeared in EastEnders in a minor role as a hairdresser before achieving fame in the BBC drama series Casualty.

=== Characterisation ===
Tiffany has been described as a "tart with a heart". According to McCutcheon, Tiffany's original character outline, as described by the casting directors, portrayed her as a "feisty and quite bitchy character, quite worldly."

McCutcheon has claimed that she partly based her portrayal of Tiffany on her own mother, Jenny; her mother gave her advice on how to play the character. McCutcheon claims her mother told her "to wear the dangly earrings with the short skirts and the low, V-neck tops, because that's what the barmaids wore. She was very open about it all. She'd say you need to lean over and say in a breathy but firm voice, 'Hello! What d'you fancy?' And, hopefully, they'll say, 'You', and you'll get free drinks all night." McCutcheon has described Tiffany as "fun and sassy". She added, "She has also got a lot of her morals wrong and she's a bit back to front. But she means well!"

=== Relationship with Grant Mitchell ===
A volatile relationship between Tiffany and her boss, landlord Grant Mitchell (Ross Kemp), was scripted in the show. It began with a one-night stand on-screen, which led to "a sizzling undercurrent between them". McCutcheon felt in 1996 that there was a lot of chemistry between Grant and Tiffany and was keen for the characters to have a legitimate relationship. However, plots went on to pair Tiffany with another character, the sexually confused Tony Hills (Mark Homer). In the storyline, Tony struggles with his homosexuality and, fearful of these urges, begins a relationship with Tiffany. This facilitates several plot twists, when Tiffany discovers she is pregnant she is uncertain as to whether the baby is Tony's or Grant's, and simultaneously, Tony begins an affair with Tiffany's brother Simon Raymond (Andrew Lynford). When Tony and Simon's affair is uncovered, Tiffany reunites with Grant after telling him her baby is his and they elope off-screen.

Depicted as a problematic marriage, according to a show insider in 1996, "The marriage runs into trouble before the ink has even dried on the wedding certificate". In the storyline Grant falls for another barmaid, Lorraine Wicks (Jacqueline Leonard), and the Mitchell partnership ends in separation the same year when Grant is informed that Tiffany's baby might not be his. Later, Grant begrudgingly reunites with Tiffany in 1997 when he is confirmed as the father, but attempts to brand Tiffany as an incompetent mother. The Mitchell baby saga was a ratings success for EastEnders. Commenting on the storyline and her character, McCutcheon said in 1997, "Tiffany will be really upset that Grant is trying to make out she's not a good mother. It's so unjust, she adores [her daughter] Courtney. She's changed completely since the birth. She used to be hard and selfish, only interested in men and clothes, being free and having a wild time. Now all she wants is to settle down. Grant can't complain if he feels his daughter isn't being looked after properly. He hasn't given Tiff the support she needs."

Tiffany's determination for the marriage to succeed despite upset was a repetitive theme and in 1997, McCutcheon discussed Tiffany's motivation and development as Tiffany and Grant prepared to have the marriage blessed in a more formal ceremony aired on-screen: "Tiffany sees [her marriage to Grant] as her last chance to grab some happiness. She never wants to suffer again the way she did. The pair of them gave their all in an effort to try to make it work. So delighted to have Grant back that this should be the best day of her life." McCutcheon claims that this spelt a new phase for Tiffany's character as she made a determined effort to win Grant back but under her own terms: "Now Tiffany is much more assertive. She loves Grant, but this time round she will never allow him to rule her life. Grant has to remember that now she sees it as equally important to be a mother as well as a wife. Having her daughter Courtney, she knows she will never be alone and does not need to follow meekly in Grant's shadow." McCutcheon added, "[Tiffany]'s changed completely since the birth [of her daughter]. She used to be hard and selfish, only interested in men and clothes, being free and having a wild time. Now all she wants is to settle down."

=== Departure ===
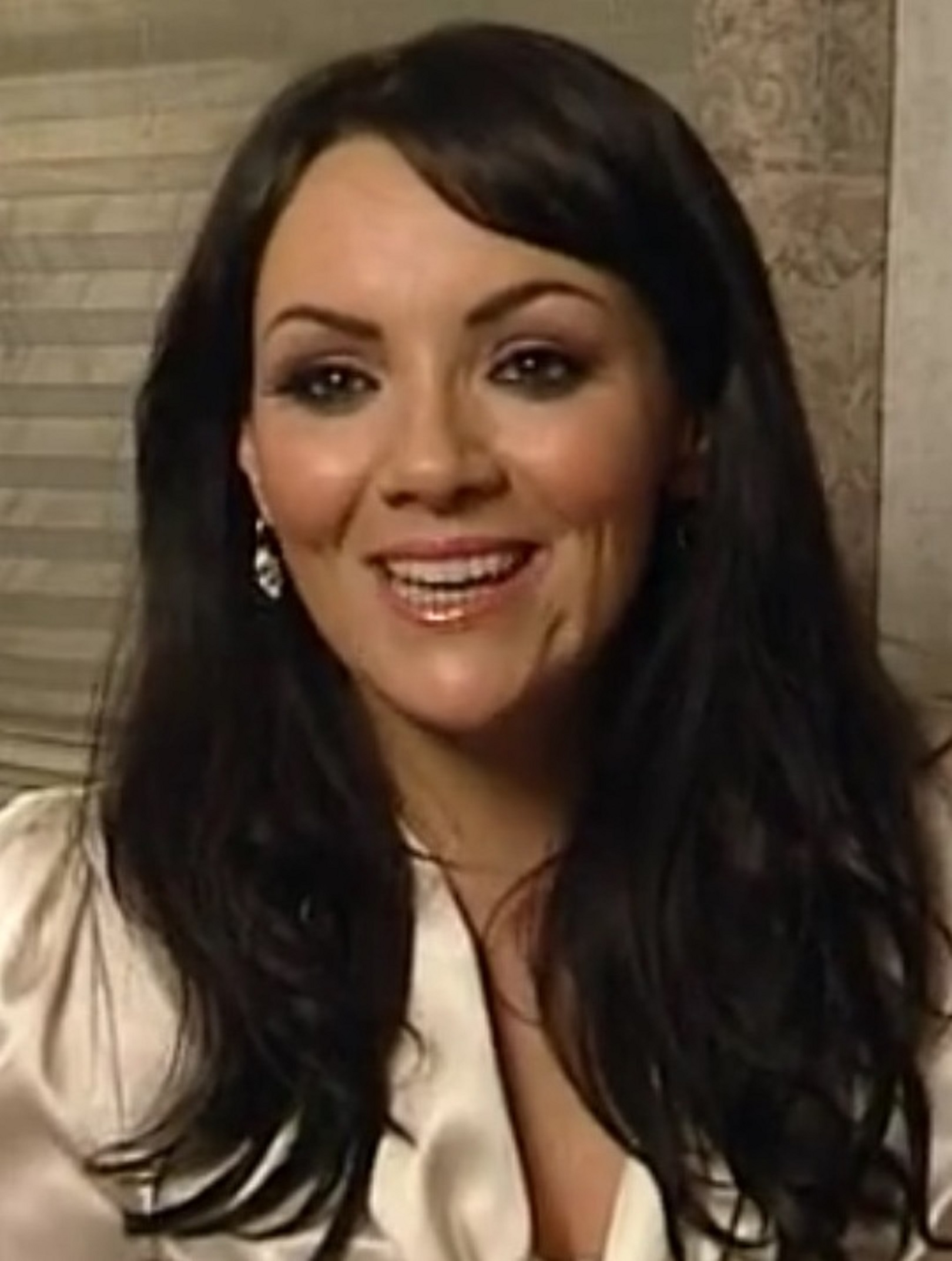
Martine McCutcheon (pictured) disagreed with the producer's decision to kill off Tiffany.

In September 1997, it was leaked to the press that McCutcheon was considering leaving EastEnders in order to pursue a singing career. Rumours about her exit continued throughout early 1998, with sources suggesting that McCutcheon was hoping to remain on EastEnders while also releasing music. In an interview with website Walford Web, Matthew Robinson, the executive producer at the time, gave his account of what happened. He stated that McCutcheon demanded that "the BBC allow her to come and go within the series at her behest, making it impossible for storyliners to write coherently for her character." Because of this, the show's bosses made the decision to kill the character of Tiffany off. McCutcheon was displeased with this and went public with her criticism of the decision, stating that she was not informed by the producers but heard the news on the radio after a tabloid newspaper ran a front-page story with the headline "Tiff's a stiff". Robinson suggested that this was due to an unsanctioned leak to the press.

On-screen, Tiffany's exit storyline centred upon another break-up with husband Grant after she discovered that he had slept with her mother Louise (Carol Harrison). Leading up to her final scenes in December 1998, Tiffany and Grant were involved in a row that left Tiffany hospitalised after falling down the stairs; Tiffany attempted to frame Grant for pushing her. 20 million viewers watched the episode. Matthew Robinson said he was delighted by the figures, saying they showed "our stories just get better and better. It's a great tribute to EastEnders' storyliners, writers and cast, particularly Martine McCutcheon as Tiffany." Viewing figures remained high throughout the Christmas 1998 week as the storyline climaxed in Tiffany's exit on the New Year's episode, when Tiffany was killed after being hit by a car while trying to retrieve Courtney from Grant. Her exit was watched by over 12 million viewers.

McCutcheon publicly slammed the BBC's "Controller of Continuing Drama Series", Mal Young, who was one of the executives who made the decision to kill her character. She accused him of treating her unfairly and bringing her role in the soap to an end so irrevocably, merely as punishment for leaving. In turn, Young has hit back at McCutcheon, saying her anger only arose because she wanted him to keep her role in EastEnders open as a 'safety net', in case her pop career failed, and he was not prepared to do this. McCutcheon subsequently wrote an autobiography entitled Who Does She Think She Is?: My Autobiography, which depicts Young less than favourably.

Robinson defended the decision to kill the character, telling Walford Web, "Far from hasty, the decision was carefully made, not just by me, but by the trio of Mal Young, Peter Salmon (BBC1 Controller) and me. We knew exactly what we were doing and it was exactly right for the show at the time, whatever Martine continues to say about it. Sometimes, actors want to have their cake and eat it. This is not possible in a streamlined production factory, like EastEnders." McCutcheon commented, "I wanted to be written out but not in such a final way. I was very upset. Even if I become the most successful singer in the world, I would still have loved it if I could have walked back into the Queen Vic." In a subsequent interview she added:

What I wanted to do was come back, no matter what happened. To come back, walk into the Vic and say, `Hello Grant'. I told them that even if I had a number one single I would sign a contract to say I'd turn up in the Vic one last time because people would love it. I knew the BBC producers had given time off to other cast members. I thought they might do the same for me. But they wouldn't budge. They just said: `No - you either stay with it as it is or we're going to kill you off'. I said: `Don't you think that's a little drastic? We've got the best writers in Britain. There are loads of wonderful, dramatic things we can do. It doesn't mean you have to kill her off forever. That leaves no hope for me, for the public as far as the character goes, and no hope for the show as far as Tiffany is concerned [...] they knew I would make my singing career work and they wanted to get their pound of flesh from me before I went.

== Storylines ==
Tiffany is invited to a house party by her friend Bianca Jackson (Patsy Palmer) in Albert Square. She rejects Bianca's younger brother Robbie Jackson's (Dean Gaffney) romantic advances. After finding work as a barmaid at The Queen Victoria public house, Tiffany moves to Walford. She soon meets the pub's landlord Grant Mitchell (Ross Kemp), and one night a disagreement between the pair leads to passion; Tiffany ends up sleeping with Grant. A few months later, she reveals to Grant that her father caused her to miscarry; he comforts her and they have sex again. When sober, they both agree not to repeat this and Tiffany begins dating Tony Hills (Mark Homer). They move in together and the relationship blossoms until Tiffany discovers she is pregnant. Although she knows there is a possibility her child is Grant's, she decides to claim her baby is Tony's. It is not until Tiffany discovers Tony kissing her brother, Simon Raymond (Andrew Lynford), that she realises Tony is bisexual and has been romancing with her brother behind her back. Devastated, Tiffany tells Grant he is her baby's father. Determined to raise the child, Grant whisks Tiffany away to Paris in November 1996 for a quick wedding. Tony refuses to believe Grant is the father and subsequent fights ensue, with Tiffany staunchly denying Tony has claim to her unborn baby.

Living with Grant proves difficult for Tiffany. Grant refuses to allow Tiffany to socialise or drink alcohol, fearing that it may harm his unborn child. After Grant witnesses Tiffany having a cocktail, he is incensed. Tiffany threatens to leave him and Grant almost attacks her but is stopped by Lorraine Wicks (Jacqueline Leonard). Lorraine consoles a distraught Tiffany, who breaks down and admits that Grant may not be her baby's father. Lorraine tries to convince Tiffany to tell Grant the truth, but Tiffany decides against it and continues to keep up the pretence. Meanwhile, Lorraine begins to make her real intentions towards Grant clear. On Christmas Eve 1996 she and Grant kiss and on New Year's Eve, Lorraine informs Grant there is a possibility Tiffany's baby is not his. Grant reacts by throwing a pregnant Tiffany out. Their separation allows Grant to embark on a relationship with Lorraine, destroying Tiffany.

Tiffany gives birth to baby Courtney by caesarean section in March 1997, and for a moment Grant softens towards his wife. However it does not last and he is soon denouncing that the child is his. Tiffany is forced to get a paternity test, which reveals Grant is Courtney's father. Tiffany is allowed to stay at The Queen Vic so Grant can keep his daughter close. Still in love with Grant, Tiffany begs Grant to rethink their separation; he initially responds by threatening to sue her for sole custody of Courtney but changes his mind following Lorraine's departure from Walford. Not long after their reconciliation in August 1997, Grant and Tiffany renew their wedding vows and bond on a romantic trip to Paris. However, by 1998 he and Tiffany are rowing again. During a heated argument, Grant hits his mother, Peggy Mitchell (Barbara Windsor), who is trying to stop Grant's violent outburst on Tiffany. Following this Tiffany moves out of the Mitchell residence and in with her mother, Louise Raymond (Carol Harrison).

Grant attempts a reconciliation with Tiffany, but she decides she wants a divorce. She grows close to police officer Beppe di Marco (Michael Greco), who has fallen for Tiffany and despises Grant for his treatment of her. Grant decides to counter their relationship by making a pass at Tiffany's mother, Louise; they sleep together. Their affair abruptly ends when Tiffany reconsiders divorcing Grant. She and Grant reunite, but months later a distraught Tiffany overhears them talking about their affair over a baby monitor. Unbeknown to Louise or Grant, Tiffany starts packing to leave Walford. She confronts Grant, telling him that she is taking Courtney and he would never see her again. She attempts to leave but in her haste she accidentally falls down the stairs and is hospitalised with a blood clot on the brain and lapses into a coma. Everyone assumes Grant pushed her and when Tiffany wakes up and is released from hospital she is quickly prompted and persuaded by Beppe to lie to police and say that Grant pushed her. This then culminates in Grant being arrested for attempted murder on Christmas Day 1998.

On New Year's Eve 1998, Tiffany makes plans to leave Walford with Courtney for Spain. While Courtney is left at The Queen Vic with Peggy, Tiffany takes it upon herself to tie up her various loose ends, firstly by disowning her mother Louise and breaking up with Beppe, whom she has never really had any true feelings for. Tiffany changes her mind about framing Grant and writes a signed confession exonerating him of any wrongdoing in her fall down the stairs. She then instructs Bianca to give it to the police after she has departed following an emotional goodbye. Unbeknownst to Tiffany, however, Grant has already been released from prison on bail. He returns to The Queen Vic, moments before Tiffany herself returns to claim Courtney. Having been told by Tiffany only hours earlier that she is planning to leave the country, Grant snatches Courtney and flees. Hysterical and frightened, Tiffany pursues them, which results in her running straight into an oncoming car, driven by Frank Butcher (Mike Reid). A helpless crowd watch as she dies at the scene. Tiffany is cremated and her ashes are scattered at Peacehaven.

Four years after Tiffany's death, Bianca names her daughter Tiffany Butcher (Maisie Smith) - after her best friend.

== Other appearances ==
In December 1998, to coincide with the character's death, a fictional book penned by Kate Lock entitled Tiffany's Secret Diary was released. The diary documented Tiffany's time in the soap, beginning when she discovered her pregnancy and covering several years of her life until Christmas 1998. The book was a number one bestseller.

== Reception ==
BBC executive Mal Young has suggested that Tiffany was an iconic character, akin to original characters Den Watts and Angie Watts (Leslie Grantham and Anita Dobson). McCutcheon has suggested that Tiffany was universally liked by men and women, "was the kind of allowable fantasy, fancied by men, admired by women, that enabled all viewers to love her". McCutcheon claims that she received much fanmail whilst in the role, with offers of marriage proposals. She claims that young girls idolised Tiffany. McCutcheon's performance as Tiffany saw her win 'Most Popular Actress' at the 1997 National Television Awards, and 'Best Actress' at the 1998 TV Quick and TV Choice Awards. Tiffany was voted Britain's sexiest soap star in 1997.

In the book, Monarchies: What Are Kings and Queens For?, the authors relate Tiffany's death in EastEnders to the real death of Princess Diana - a senseless death of a beautiful young woman. The authors suggest that Tiffany's death was one of the most powerful and popular stories featured in EastEnders. They suggest that like Diana, Tiffany was "A beautiful, flawed and misunderstood woman, she died in tragic circumstances while escaping a pursuer who wanted to possess her." Tiffany's death has been described as event television in the book Television at the crossroads, meaning a programme that causes audiences to break their viewing habits for an evening and all migrate to the same channel at the same time.

Grant and Tiffany's volatile relationship made headlines in July 1997 amid reports that EastEnders' bosses were considering airing a controversial storyline that would see Tiffany raped by Grant. The plot, which was slated to be aired on Christmas Day 1997, evoked criticism from female MPs and children's groups, TV clean-up campaigners and church officials, who were all expressive in unanimous condemnation about the BBC's "cynical ploy to win the seasonal ratings war over arch-rival Coronation Street." Labour MP Ann Clwyd suggested that the BBC should "reconsider" and Michelle Elliott, director of the children's charity Kidscape, said: "This is an appalling, outrageous, utterly nauseous example of rape for ratings." Reports also alleged that Grant's actor Ross Kemp was not happy about the plot either and threatened to quit the role unless the scripts were altered. Subsequently, the plot never came to fruition.

In 2020, Sara Wallis and Ian Hyland from The Daily Mirror placed Tiffany 32nd on their ranked list of the Best EastEnders characters of all time, calling her "Poor old Tiff" and writing that "the nation wept" when she was killed off. In 2023, Lewis Knight from Radio Times called Tiffany an "iconic character".
