= Carol Harrison =

English actress and writer (born 1954)

- Born: 6 February 1954 (age 72); Chatham, Kent, England
- Spouse(s): Jamie Foreman (divorced); Ian Grant (present)
- Children: 1
- Relatives: Freddie Foreman (father-in-law)

Carol Harrison (born 8 June 1954) is an English actress and writer. She is known mostly for her work on British television, in particular her role as Louise Raymond in the BBC's EastEnders.

== Career ==
Harrison made her acting debut in 1976, in the BBC police drama, Softly Softly, which was a spin-off from an earlier show, Z-Cars. In 1980 she made her film debut, securing a minor role in the 1980 adaptation of The Elephant Man. She went on to appear in a number of television programmes including The Gentle Touch (1982); Q.E.D. (1982); The Cleopatras (1983); Minder (1984); Casualty (1987, 1996 & 2008); Dorothy in London's Burning from 1988 to 1989; Kavanagh QC (1995); The Bill (1995) and ITV's A Touch of Frost (1997).

One of her most notable and long running roles, was playing the part of Gloria in the BBC sitcom Brush Strokes (1986–1991), remaining in the role for five series. However, it is her role in the BBC soap opera EastEnders (1998–1999) that she is most remembered for. Harrison played Louise Raymond, the selfish mother of Tiffany (Martine McCutcheon) and Simon (Andrew Lynford). Harrison's character was involved in several storylines, including an affair with her daughter's husband Grant (Ross Kemp). This role was not the first time Harrison had appeared in the soap. She had previously had an earlier role in 1986, playing the mother of a young boy who was rescued from a speeding lorry by Andy O'Brien (Ross Davidson).

Harrison left EastEnders in 1999 so she could take a master's degree in screenwriting. In 2006 she began teaching Script and Screen at Brighton Film School.

Harrison's other acting credits include the films Tank Malling (1989) and Human Traffic (1999), and the ITV police drama The Bill (1995 & 2002). In 2005 she also took part in the Channel 4 series Extreme Celebrity Detox.

She took part in TV series Celebrity Coach Trip partnered with friend Ingrid Tarrant.

In 2016, Harrison wrote and produced the mod musical All or Nothing, based on the life of Steve Marriott, of whom she had been a fan since 1965 when he appeared with the Small Faces at a concert in Chesterfield, Derbyshire. Her musical toured around the country in 2016 and 2017, receiving positive reviews, before closing early after a short run at the Ambassadors Theatre in London's West End.. The show was revived after the COVID-19 pandemic lockdown, with the cast undertaking a nationwide tour.

== Personal life ==
Harrison was born in Chatham; not long after she was born her father Vic left and Carol was raised in West Ham in a working class, single parent family by her mother Frances. She failed her 11-plus exams in her youth and later discovered that she is dyslexic. Harrison was once married to the actor Jamie Foreman, son of the 1960s London gangster Freddie Foreman. They have a son named Alfie.
