= Grant Mitchell (EastEnders) =

- EastEnders character
- Ross Kemp as Grant Mitchell (2025)
- Portrayed by: Ross Kemp (1990–2016, 2025–2026); Teddy Jay (2022, 2025; flashback)
- Duration: 1990–1999; 2005–2006; 2016; 2022; 2025–2026
- First appearance: Episode 527; 22 February 1990
- Last appearance: Episode 7336; 26 May 2026
- Introduced by: Michael Ferguson (1990); Kate Harwood (2005); Dominic Treadwell-Collins (2016); Chris Clenshaw (2022, 2025); Ben Wadey (2026)
- Book appearances: Blood Ties: The Life and Loves of Grant Mitchell
- Spin-off appearances: Dimensions in Time (1993); The Mitchells – Naked Truths (1998)
In-universe information
- Occupation: Soldier; Mechanic; Barman; Pub landlord; Businessman; Career criminal; Bar owner
- Family: Mitchell
- Father: Eric Mitchell
- Mother: Peggy Mitchell
- Stepfather: Frank Butcher; Archie Mitchell
- Brothers: Phil Mitchell
- Sisters: Sam Mitchell
- Wife: Sharon Watts (1991–1995); Tiffany Raymond (1996–1999); Carla Mitchell (2003–2006)
- Sons: Mark Fowler
- Daughters: Courtney Mitchell
- Uncles: Archie Mitchell; Clive Mitchell
- Aunts: Aunt Sal
- Nephews: Ben Mitchell; Raymond Dawkins; Albie Watts; Ricky Branning
- Nieces: Louise Mitchell
- First cousins: Ronnie Mitchell; Roxy Mitchell; Lenny Martin; Loretta Martin
- Other relatives: Billy Mitchell

Grant Mitchell is a fictional character from the British soap opera EastEnders, played by Ross Kemp. He was introduced by executive producer Michael Ferguson to revamp the show, and originally served as one of the show's protagonists throughout the 1990s, with the character first appearing in 22 February 1990 and then departing on 25 October 1999 after Kemp had opted to leave the show. He then returned to the show on 24 October 2005 for a few weeks and returned again between March and June 2006. Kemp was persuaded to return to the role for brief stints during a period of heavy media criticism aimed at EastEnders. The return proved to be a ratings success. Kemp reprised the role of Grant for various guest stints in 2016, appearing in twelve episodes between 13 May and 9 September. An archived recording of his voice was heard on 25 January 2022. On 26 July 2022, it was announced that Grant would feature in a flashback episode focusing on the Mitchell family in 1979. Teddy Jay played the role of Grant for this special episode, which aired on 5 September 2022. On 1 January 2025, it was announced that both Kemp and Jay would reprise their respective roles as Grant as part of the show's 40th anniversary, with the character appearing in nine episodes between 13 and 27 February. He made a further appearance on 23 December later that year, with Jay reprising his role again as part of a hallucination in the 1990s during a special episode heavily focused on Nigel Bates' (Paul Bradley) worsening dementia. Kemp returned to the soap in scenes that aired during the 27 April 2026 episode and exited in scenes during the 26 May of the same year.

Throughout the course of his 1990s duration, Grant established himself as one of the show's most prominent characters. He was portrayed as a tough persona, known for his fiery temper and his tendency to resort to violence. Despite this, however, his family is important to him – particularly his relationship with his older brother Phil Mitchell (Steve McFadden). Known as the "Mitchell brothers", Grant and Phil have become household names in the United Kingdom – due to their association with the stereotypical black leather jacket-wearing bald and brutal thug. They have been parodied even in adverts where their gruff, tough talking, cockney accents have been impersonated. One of EastEnders' most popular and highly rated storylines was "Sharongate", where Grant discovers that his wife Sharon Watts (Letitia Dean) has been having an affair with his brother. In light of this iconic revelation, Grant attacked Phil and exacted revenge on Sharon until she departed the programme following her betrayal. Grant later marries local barmaid Tiffany Raymond (Martine McCutcheon) and she gives birth to their daughter, Courtney. However, their marriage ended in tragedy when Grant's stepfather Frank Butcher (Mike Reid) accidentally runs her down on New Year's Eve 1998.

The character has also become a prime suspect in the murder of Sharon's hated boss Eddie Royle (Michael Melia); sparked a longstanding feud with her best-friend Michelle Fowler (Susan Tully); clashed with Peggy's campaign rival George Palmer (Paul Moriarty); developed a close friendship with local shopkeeper Nigel Bates (Paul Bradley); formed a conflict with Sam's former boyfriend David Wicks (Michael French); harboured romantic feelings with David's former wife Lorraine (Jacqueline Leonard); cheated on Tiffany by having an affair with her mother Louise (Carol Harrison); triggered a rivalry with his archenemy Beppe di Marco (Michael Greco); disputed with Beppe's younger brother Gianni (Marc Bannerman); worked with Palmer's daughter Annie (Nadia Sawalha) on a jointed business venture at the local gym; established an antagonistic business partnership with Phil's would-be sworn nemesis, Steve Owen (Martin Kemp); had a one-night stand with Phil's estranged wife Kathy Beale (Gillian Taylforth); exonerated Sam for the murder of Sharon's adopted father, Den (Leslie Grantham), by proving to his ex-wife that her stepmother Chrissie (Tracy-Ann Oberman) was responsible for the crime; teamed up with Phil to confront their mother's gangland enemy, Johnny Allen (Billy Murray), and get justice for the death of Sharon's adopted brother-turned-second husband Dennis Rickman (Nigel Harman) in the Get Johnny Week scenario; embarked on a tryst with cafe owner Jane Beale (Laurie Brett) while she is romantically engaged to Phil's hated stepson Ian (Adam Woodyatt); ended his third ill-fated marriage to Carla (Christianne Oliveira) upon learning that she turned him against Courtney; discovering that he is the father of Michelle's secret son, Mark (Ned Porteous), in light of coping with losing his mother Peggy to cancer, reuniting with Mark a decade later amidst struggling with Nigel's death in 2026 and a feud with Max Branning (Jake Wood). Despite his tough nature, he is also a womaniser and has been involved in several romances with an array of women – including Julie Cooper (Louise Plowright), Nina Harris (Troy Titus-Adams), Chelsea Fox (Tiana Benjamin), Belinda Peacock (Carli Norris), and Linda Carter (Kellie Bright).

== Character creation ==
=== Background ===
In the latter part of 1989 EastEnders executive producer Michael Ferguson, had taken over from Mike Gibbon. Ferguson had previously been a producer on ITV's The Bill – a hard-hitting and successful police drama, which seemed to be challenging EastEnders in providing a realistic vision of modern life in London. Due to his success on The Bill, Peter Cregeen, the Head of Series at the BBC, poached Ferguson to become executive producer of EastEnders.

Following a relatively unsuccessful inclination towards comedic storylines throughout 1989, Ferguson decided to take the soap in a new direction in 1990. Big changes were implemented both off-screen and on-screen. Ferguson altered the way the episodes were produced, changed the way the storylines were conceptualised and introduced a far greater amount of location work than had previously been seen. EastEnders scriptwriter Colin Brake has said that it was a challenging period, but "the results on-screen were a programme with a new sense of vitality, and a programme more in touch with the real world than it had been for a while".

As a consequence of these changes, a large number of characters, including Marge Green (Pat Coombs), Julie Cooper (Louise Plowright), Trevor Short (Phil McDermott) and Paul Priestly (Mark Thrippleton), were axed in early 1990 as the new production machine cleared way for a new direction and new characters. Two major new characters, the Mitchell brothers, made their first appearance in February 1990. Ferguson wanted to introduce a couple of young men who would bring an air of danger, characters who would be "unpredictable" and "bursting with energy". Phil and Grant Mitchell went on to become major long-term characters, rooted firmly at the heart of the series.

=== Casting ===
To cast Phil and Grant Mitchell many actors were screen-tested together. This was done to assure that the chosen actors – who would work predominantly alongside each other – had a strong rapport and physical resemblance. Producer Corinne Hollingworth has commented: "There were some good actors we had to turn down because we couldn't find the 'right' brother". Ross Kemp was chosen to play Grant. Kemp was an actor with a stocky, muscular build and shaven hair, making him an ideal choice to play one of Walford's latest "tough-men". Steve McFadden was given the role of Phil. Both actors worked well and convincingly together and both shared similar physical characteristics, such as short cropped hair and a "round, open face" – facial characteristics also shared by Danniella Westbrook, who was chosen to play their sister Samantha partly because of this.

=== Personality ===
Of the two brothers Grant was the more volatile, but both had a sense of physical danger about them, and both displayed stereotypical masculinity, thuggish behaviour and a tendency to resolve problems through violence. Grant was originally depicted as the more spontaneous of the Mitchell double-act, suffering from a lack of self-control, often incapable of restraining himself and requiring his elder brother to do it for him. Despite the brothers' closeness, rivalry between them was sometimes evident. It was later revealed that Grant's terrible temper was due to post-traumatic stress disorder, caused by nightmares and scarring memories of his combat in the Falklands War.

Grant often displayed laddish, thrill-seeking behaviour; drinking, chasing women, clubbing, gambling and living off of his wits. He became restless easily and actively sought the thrill of danger in order to regain excitement in his life, which led to his participation in numerous crimes, fights and affairs. Grant showed impulsive behaviour, a disregard for social rules and an indifference to the feelings of others, particularly the women in his life. He was often portrayed as arrogant and egotistical, with an inflated opinion of his own importance. Because of this, he rarely admitted to being at fault or backed down from an argument. While the character mellowed in his later years, such behaviour was still apparent. However he is not completely without showing rare signs of compassion. An example of this was that he was one of the few people who offered support to Mark Fowler when he was isolated by the rest of Albert Square (led ironically by Grant's mother, Peggy), because of his HIV illness. Another was that he went to console Nigel Bates after his wife, Debbie, was killed by in a road accident.

Grant took great pride in being a Mitchell, his late father had a local reputation as a boxer. He always strived to live up to the family name and enjoyed the reputation he inherited and maintained. While Grant liked to think of himself as indestructible, he at many times showed emotional vulnerability and a need to be mothered. Indeed, at times he was just as likely to burst into tears as he was to throw a punch. Because of this, he attracted many women, despite the fact that he often treated them as possessions, disregarding their feelings and eliciting exaggerated revenge should they cross him (resulting in spousal abuse and the destruction of all three of his marriages). His quick temper was off-set by a period of genuine remorse and promises that he would change. However, more often than not, Grant reverted to form and when placed under pressure he seemed incapable of controlling his aggression, disregarding all consequences.

== Development and impact ==
The Mitchell brothers quickly became two of the soap's most popular characters and storylines involving the brothers soon began to dominate the programme. Their arrival heralded a new era for the soap, which aptly coincided with the beginning of a new decade – EastEnders during the 1980s having been very much dominated by the hugely popular Fowler and Watts families.

=== Sharongate ===
One of the most notable and popular early storylines involving Grant was a love triangle between him, his brother and his wife Sharon (played by Letitia Dean). Despite the fact that Sharon married Grant initially, EastEnders writer Tony Jordan has revealed in The Mitchells – The Full Story that the love-triangle storyline had been planned since Phil and Grant's introduction, after the writers came to the realisation that Sharon was perfect for them both. This storyline was slow burning and was spread over several years, providing a plethora of dramatic tension along the way. The episode in which Phil betrayed his brother with Sharon occurred in September 1992 in one of the soap's notorious three-handers. Sue Dunderdale directed the episodes and the performances of McFadden, Kemp and Dean have been described as memorable and filled with high-tension drama. Things finally came to a head in 1994 with some of EastEnders' most popular and renowned episodes, which have been dubbed "Sharongate". The episodes – which were watched by 25.3 million viewers – centred on Grant's discovery of the affair and his startling reaction. The repercussions of Phil's betrayal contributed to many subsequent storylines involving the brothers throughout the 1990s. Writer of Sharongate, Tony Jordan, has stated that of all the storylines he has penned for the soap, Sharongate is the one he is most proud of. He comments "Three of the strongest characters that have ever been in EastEnders are the Mitchell brothers and Sharon... when we actually blew that story it was incredible... being able to reach that many people with your work is what makes EastEnders exciting." Sharongate has also proven a popular storyline with viewers and it was voted the sixth top soap opera moment of the decade in a poll of 17,000 people for What's On TV magazine.

=== Volatile marriage to Tiffany ===
From 1996 to 1998 viewers were gripped by Grant's combustible marriage to Tiffany Raymond (played by Martine McCutcheon). Their relationship was a typical portrayal of unrequited love on Tiffany's side and was fraught with tragedy and drama. For Grant it was more a marriage of convenience, allowing him access to his daughter, Courtney. Grant's poor treatment of Tiffany included physical and emotional abuse and two affairs, one of which was with her mother Louise (played by Carol Harrison) and the other with Lorraine Wicks (played by Jacqueline Leonard). Their volatile relationship made headlines in July 1997 amid reports that EastEnders bosses were considering airing a highly controversial storyline that saw Tiffany brutally raped by Grant. The plot, which was slated to be aired on Christmas Day 1997, evoked high criticism from female MPs and children's groups, TV clean-up campaigners and church officials, who were all expressive in unanimous condemnation about the BBC's "cynical ploy to win the seasonal ratings war over arch-rival Coronation Street." Labour MP Ann Clwyd suggested that the BBC should "reconsider" and Michelle Elliott, director of the children's charity Kidscape, said: "This is an appalling, outrageous, utterly nauseous example of rape for ratings." Reports also alleged that actor Ross Kemp was not happy about the plot either and threatened to quit the role unless the scripts were altered. Subsequently, the plot never came to fruition.

The following year EastEnders topped the ratings at Christmas 1998 when Grant was accused of the attempted murder of Tiffany, and the following Monday 15.7 million viewers tuned in to see Grant make a first court appearance. The year finally culminated with the death of Tiffany – killed in a motor accident, while trying to reclaim her daughter from Grant. 22 million viewers tuned in to see Grant and Tiffany's final clash on New Year's Eve 1998.

=== Initial departure and the Mitchell Brothers car crash ===
On 24 March 1999, it was reported that Kemp had decided to leave EastEnders after almost ten years of playing Grant. The storyline signifying his departure played heavily on the Mitchell brothers' fragile and damaged relationship. After discovering that Grant vengefully had sex with his wife Kathy Mitchell, Phil went ballistic with a handgun causing the car Grant was driving to career at high speed into the River Thames. The episode was written by Tony Jordan, directed by Paul Annett and was watched by 19.5 million viewers. Shot in London's Docklands, the scenes required stunt doubles, divers and crash test dummies and it has been hailed as "one of the soap's most dramatic storylines ever."

Initially viewers were left uncertain as to whether Grant survived the crash, but the character was not killed off and a week later viewers saw Grant depart along with his daughter Courtney for a new life in Rio, Brazil. A spokesperson from the BBC confirmed, "the door is always open for a return."

=== 2005 return ===
After nearly six years away, Kemp was lured back to EastEnders for a fixed period in order to reunite the Mitchell family on-screen. Executive producer, Kate Harwood, commented: "We are so pleased that Ross will be back on the show. His character is one of the most iconic and popular in the history of soap. The impact of his return for the inhabitants of Walford should not be underestimated. It is going to be fireworks from the start."

Grant's high-profile return, which aired in October 2005, proved to be a ratings success. The first two episodes drew respective audiences of 13.15 million (52.9%) and 12.8 million (55.2%) in the overnight ratings alone, consolidating to 13.34 and 13.21 million viewers, respectively. Although he only featured in the show for a period of three weeks initially, his contract was subsequently extended for a further three months, beginning in the spring of 2006. The character was involved in numerous storylines, including the unveiling of Den Watts' killer; an affair with Ian Beale's (Adam Woodyatt) girlfriend, Jane Collins; and a week's worth of episodes dubbed "Get Johnny Week", which saw the Mitchell brothers embroiled in a vendetta against gangland boss Johnny Allen. Soon afterwards, Kemp departed the role again on 9 June 2006.

In 2011, Kemp told Radio Times that he has no plans to return to EastEnders: "I enjoy the fact that I've far more control over my destiny than I ever had when acting. I didn't even watch the soaps when I was in them because it's like a coal miner coming home and staring at the coal scuttle – I was never a great lover of watching myself act."

=== 2016 return ===
On 18 January 2016, it was announced that Kemp had agreed to reprise his role for a few episodes. His return coincided with Windsor's final appearance as Grant's mother Peggy. Grant was also reunited with Phil, Sharon and Kathy. Of his return, Kemp commented, "When I was approached about returning to EastEnders for Barbara's final episodes, it was something I could not turn down. Barbara is a very close friend so when I learned of the storyline, it felt right that the Mitchell brothers are reunited with their mother for the last time. I am really looking forward to going back to EastEnders and filming what are set to be some classic EastEnders episodes." Kemp returned to filming on 6 April 2016. Later, it was announced that Kemp would film a further three weeks, and he resumed filming on 6 June 2016 and finished on 26 June 2016.

Following Grant's third departure in September 2016, Kemp revealed that he did not think he would ever go back to EastEnders again but did not rule out a return.

=== 2025 and 2026 returns ===
On 28 November 2024, it was reported that Kemp was seen leaving the EastEnders set, leading to speculation that he may return as Grant again for the 40th anniversary. It was previously reported 2 months prior that Kemp would front a documentary about the show's four decades on air. On 1 January 2025, it was announced that Kemp would be reprising the role for a short stint for EastEnders' 40th Anniversary. Kemp was "delighted" to be returning to soap, saying, "EastEnders has always meant so much to me, so to return as the show is about to celebrate such a special anniversary, is an absolute honour. Grant has never been far from the action and let’s just say, this time is no different as he certainly comes back with a bang". Executive producer Chris Clenshaw was also "absolutely thrilled" to be welcoming Kemp to portray the "legendary" Grant, and teased that while he would not reveal what would bring Grant back, he confirmed that the return would "make up many moments of truly unmissable TV" and be a "significant part" of the soap's 40th anniversary.

In February 2026, Ben Wadey announced that Kemp would reprise the role once more, aligning with Grant's return, which was set to coincide with "two significant storylines" involving the character. Scenes featuring Grant's return began airing on 27 April 2026. Kemp exited the role following Grant's departure on 26 May 2026.

== Storylines ==
=== 1990–1999 ===
Grant Mitchell arrives in Albert Square in February 1990 with his older brother Phil (Steve McFadden), and the pair become co-owners of the local garage, The Arches. Grant had returned to civilian life in London having been a paratrooper in the Army, which included serving in the Falklands War at the age of 19. After a brief fling with Julie Cooper (Louise Plowright) and getting involved in various dodgy deals, Grant starts wooing the local barmaid, Sharon Watts (Letitia Dean). She grows attracted to his machismo, and soon their flirting progresses into a relationship. Fiercely protective of his girlfriend, most of Grant's initial problems in the Square revolve around his over-possessive nature and jealousy. He puts Sharon's boss Eddie Royle (Michael Melia), the landlord of The Queen Victoria public house, in hospital after he makes a pass at Sharon; he later becomes prime suspect for Royle's murder, but is proved not guilty when the killer is revealed to be Nick Cotton (John Altman), the well established local villain who eventually owns up to the crime but is found not guilty in court. In the wake of this, Grant decides to re-enlist in the army; however, he is left despondent after getting rejected for failing their psychiatric tests.

Grant and Sharon marry (1991).

Despite his hot-headed tendencies, Sharon sees a different side to Grant, and when he proposes marriage to her, she accepts on the condition that he buys her childhood home, The Queen Vic, which he does. Grant marries Sharon in December 1991 and together they run The Queen Vic. Their marriage is stormy and punctuated with violent rows and fights. Grant is desperate for a child, although Sharon would rather concentrate on the pub for the time being, and when he discovers Sharon is still taking contraception, he smashes up the pub and then disappears. In his absence, Sharon is comforted by Phil and they begin an affair, although this comes to an abrupt end when Grant returns and promises to change his ways. He cannot live up to his promises, however, and, on Sharon's birthday in October 1992, Grant sets fire to The Queen Vic to generate insurance money to pay off debts. He does not check to see whether Sharon is out of the way, and she and her dog Roly nearly die in the blaze. The insurance money is insufficient, and Sharon reacts with fury when she discovers what Grant has done. She leaves Grant for a while, and, when she returns and attempts to seize control of The Queen Vic, Grant turns violent, assaults Sharon and her best friend, Michelle Fowler (Susan Tully), and is imprisoned on remand. While he is in prison, Sharon and Phil rekindle their affair, but neither can confess to Grant, and it ends when he is released from prison. Sharon and Grant patch up their relationship; however, in the autumn of 1994, Grant discovers a tape on which Sharon talks about her affair with Phil, and plays it to a packed pub at Phil's engagement party to his fiancée, Kathy Beale (Gillian Taylforth). In response, Grant batters Phil – leaving him with a ruptured spleen – and is vindictive towards Sharon until she flees to the United States, signalling the end of their marriage after just three years. She returns briefly to enact revenge – making Grant realise that he is still in love with her, he chooses to be with Sharon over his family. Sharon is ready to turn him down in front of a packed pub and his family; however, in the end, she cannot go through with it, and stops him from publicly proposing before he humiliates himself. She then tells him that she loves him too but their relationship can no longer work, before returning to the US, leaving Grant heartbroken. They are then divorced and do not see each other for more than 10 years after this. Michelle has a volatile relationship with Grant but, following Sharon's exit, falls pregnant following a one-night stand with him and then flees to the US without telling Grant that he is to be a father. Grant would not find out that the baby is his until years later.

With Sharon and Michelle both gone, he goes on to marry the much younger Tiffany Raymond (Martine McCutcheon), who soon becomes pregnant – although it is unclear whether he or Tiffany's ex-partner Tony (Mark Homer) is the father of her child. When Grant discovers this, he is incensed and throws Tiffany out. He begins a relationship with Lorraine Wicks (Jacqueline Leonard), until a paternity test reveals that Grant is the father of her baby, Courtney (Carissa and Josephine O'Meara), who is born in March 1997. He reunites with Tiffany to be near his daughter, but by this time his marriage has deteriorated. During an argument, Tiffany falls down the stairs of the Vic and is seriously injured, but makes a full recovery. Just after Christmas 1998, Tiffany discovers that Grant has had an affair with her mother Louise (Carol Harrison), and plans to flee to Spain with Courtney. However, Grant discovers her plan and retrieves Courtney. Tiffany attempts to snatch Courtney, but is hit by a car driven by Grant's stepfather Frank Butcher (Mike Reid); she dies seconds later as the clock struck midnight. Grant tries to move on by dating barmaid Nina Harris (Troy Titus-Adams) for a while, but dumps her after discovering her past as a prostitute.

Grant goes into partnership with Phil's new enemy Steve Owen (Martin Kemp) and they end up having a feud, which ends with Grant punching Steve after getting annoyed with his disrespectful attitude towards him. By then, Grant and Phil have conducted a plan to cheat some gangsters by intercepting a drug deal and stealing a large amount of cash – in order to take care of their debts. The job is initially successful, but it quickly grows obstructive when Phil finds out that Grant had slept his ex-wife Kathy before doing the job. He confronts Grant after the job and Grant admits he did it in revenge for Phil's affair with Sharon. As they attempt to flee from the oncoming police, Phil pulls out a gun and shoots the steering wheel in their getaway car – causing Grant to plunge the car into the River Thames. Phil is rescued, but Grant is not found and presumed dead. It transpires a week later that Grant has survived, and he leaves the country with Courtney and the stolen money to Rio de Janeiro. He remains in contact with his mother and brother.

=== 2005–2006 ===
Grant returns to Walford six years later with Phil to exonerate their younger sister, Sam (Kim Medcalf), for the murder of her ex-boss and Sharon's adopted father, Den Watts (Leslie Grantham). Although she was involved in the events surrounding Den's murder, Sam was framed for the crime by his widow and her nemesis Chrissie (Tracy-Ann Oberman) – the real murderer. Grant manages to put behind him his differences with both Phil and Sharon, forgiving Sharon when she confesses that she aborted his child. The brothers manage to convince Sharon that Chrissie is the real killer and that Sam is innocent. Whilst teaming up with Phil and Sharon to prove Sam's innocence, Grant forms a rivalry with her husband Dennis Rickman (Nigel Harman) upon learning the latter had previously teamed up with Den to imprison Phil for robbery. Grant and Dennis put their differences aside to help Phil with their conflict against Johnny Allen (Billy Murray), the local gangland kingpin who holds a grudge against the Mitchell brothers because of their mother Peggy (Barbara Windsor) having her own grievances against Johnny himself. When Johnny extracts CCTV footage of Chrissie confessing to her boyfriend Jake Moon (Joel Beckett) that she killed Den, he plans to use the tape as bait for Phil and Grant – intending to kill them. The brothers eventually beat Johnny at his nightclub office in order to get the tape, which is promptly delivered to the police; as a result, Sam is released from prison and Chrissie is arrested for Den's murder.

Following Sam's release, Grant initially returns to Rio – only to later come back to Walford with Courtney (now played by Megan Jossa), citing family and financial problems back in Brazil. When Phil learns about his brother's return, he tricks Grant into helping him with quest against Johnny. During Grant's absence, Phil and Johnny embarked on a feud that led to Dennis and Sharon getting involved. The impact escalated after Dennis humiliated Johnny on Christmas Day 2005, which prompted Johnny to throttle Sharon with an ultimatum; Dennis will be killed unless she and him leave Walford for good. On the eve of 2006 commencing, Dennis learned from Phil about the threat Johnny made to Sharon – as well as being told that Johnny killed his best-friend and Sam's ex-husband, Andy Hunter (Michael Higgs), on the same night Chrissie killed Den. This resulted in Dennis beating up Johnny, who then ordered Jake's brother Danny (Jake Maskall) – his henchman – to kill Dennis. Following Dennis' murder, Phil was wracked with guilt for sparking the events of Sharon losing her husband and has vowed revenge on Johnny more than ever. After hearing Phil explain his reasons for wanting to bring Johnny to justice for killing Dennis, specifically as a promise he made to Sharon before she left Walford, Grant reluctantly accompanies his brother in settling their score with Johnny once and for all. Their efforts quickly falter by Grant arguing with Phil about the situation he has put them in, all the while Phil demands Grant to maintain their course against Johnny – who uses this opportunity to capture the brothers. Johnny later orders Danny to kill the brothers and bury them in the woods. After marching them into the forest for execution, Danny prepares to kill Grant; however, the brothers are saved when Jake appears and shoots Danny – accidentally killing him. After telling the brothers that it was Danny who killed Dennis on Johnny's orders, Jake allows Phil and Grant to flee whilst he himself proceeds to bury Danny in the woods. Phil and Grant rush back to Johnny's mansion to confront him once more, only to find out that he has already been arrested; Johnny surrendered to the police after his daughter, Ruby (Louisa Lytton) threatened to disown her father unless he confessed to his crimes. Following his arrest, Johnny is sentenced to life imprisonment and later dies of a heart attack – allowing Phil and Grant to finally put their demons to reason for good. The brothers reconcile after Phil apologises to Grant for the situation he put them in, and Grant forgives Phil for his actions.

As time goes on, Grant begins flirting with Jane Collins (Laurie Brett) – the girlfriend of Kathy's son Ian (Adam Woodyatt) – after seducing her. Their affair ends when Phil catches them together and Grant then has a one-night stand with 19-year-old Chelsea Fox – to his mother's outrage. Shortly after, his estranged Brazilian wife, Carla (Christianne Oliveira), shows up in Walford. Grant and Carla resume their relationship, but Carla's ex-partner Ray (David Kennedy) soon arrives to retrieve £12,000 that Carla has stolen from him. Carla and Ray resume their affair and plan to fleece Grant for £25,000. Grant learns of Carla's scam; unbeknownst to Carla he chases Ray away and leads Carla to believe he has fallen for her lies. Grant catches her attempting to steal his money and reacts by dumping her in a litter bin, ending their marriage. After quitting his job at the newly reopened Scarlet nightclub, currently owed by Jake following Johnny's imprisonment, Grant leaves the country again with Courtney for a new life in Portugal.

=== 2016 ===
In May 2016, Peggy returns to Albert Square following a diagnosis of terminal cancer. She decides to stop her treatment, but Phil tries to change her mind, enlisting the help of Sharon. Sharon then calls Grant in Portugal, leaving a voicemail saying that his family needs him. Grant returns to the square for the first time in nearly a decade soon after and walks in on Phil and Peggy. He plans to take Peggy with him back to Portugal, only for her to say that her cancer is active. Grant is angry when Peggy reveals that her plan for him and Sam to learn about it was by letters to them after her death by suicide, however Phil and Grant seemingly convince Peggy not to do this. Grant tells Phil he immediately needs the money that he lent him. Knowing he cannot get it, Grant threatens him unless he returns the money. Grant returns to Portugal, and Sharon has to call him about Peggy having killed herself. When Sam returns to Walford for Peggy's funeral, she reveals that Grant is unable to attend the funeral, although Grant secretly attends, laying a flower and watching from a distance.

When Grant's nephew Ben Mitchell (Harry Reid) goes missing and Phil is reluctant to get the police involved, Sharon contacts Grant for help, but Courtney (now played by Alice Nokes) meets Sharon instead; Grant has not seen the messages. Sharon decides to go to the police and finds Grant outside the police station as a result of being drunk and disorderly. Grant goes to The Queen Vic where he flirts with Belinda Peacock (Carli Norris). Grant tells Courtney that Phil killed Peggy. When Courtney tells Grant that Sharon wanted to meet him, he goes to see Sharon and declares his love to her, but she is not interested. Grant accuses Phil of killing Peggy and asks for his money back, but Phil does not have it. Grant tries to persuade Sharon to go to Portugal with him but she declares her love for Phil. Grant telephones Courtney to ask to stay with her but she refuses. Grant then meets Belinda again and they go to her home for sex but are interrupted by her family. Phil finds a letter in Sharon's bag that Michelle sent Peggy, revealing that Grant fathered Michelle's child, Mark Fowler Jnr (Ned Porteous) 21 years previously. Grant visits Jane where he learns that she has been paralysed by her adoptive son Bobby Beale (Eliot Carrington). He admits that he has lost his home and business in Portugal and is in debt. Grant and Jane both comfort each other, but Ian walks in on them and shouts at Grant for deserting his family. Grant leaves, ignoring Phil, who is attempting to tell him about Mark. Courtney calls Grant, who is staying with Aunt Sal (Anna Karen) due to losing his villa and bar in Portugal, for help after Ben and Jay Brown (Jamie Borthwick) are kidnapped by the men who attacked Ben and killed his boyfriend Paul Coker (Jonny Labey). Grant rushes to Courtney's aid and assumes Mark is attacking her, but Sharon tells him he is Michelle's son. Phil initially insists he does not need Grant's help but then accepts it. Phil collapses so Grant vows to rescue Ben. Mark gets in Grant's car to help him, and they find Ben and Grant scares off the men. Grant reconciles with Phil, admitting he no longer wants the money Phil borrowed from him, and Phil tells Grant that Mark is his son. Courtney is angry with Grant when he stops her kissing Mark. Grant confronts Ian about keeping the secret for so long and punches him after Ian insults his parenting skills. Sharon tells him the reasons Michelle did not want him involved and Grant agrees that Mark would be better off not knowing, but Jane convinces Grant otherwise, so Grant offers to take Mark for a drink. After a heart to heart, Grant realises that Mark would be better off not knowing and decides to return to Portugal after seeing Phil. Phil gives him money, and he reunites with Courtney and the pair return to Portugal. Mark also works out who Grant is, but Sharon convinces him he is better off with his adoptive father – Tim.

=== 2025–2026 ===
Over eight years later, Nigel contacts Grant over his concerns regarding Phil's health and behaviour, due to his severe depression and psychosis. Grant returns while Phil is in the midst of contemplating suicide. Grant, refusing to acknowledge any issues, attends Billy's wedding to his former spouse, Honey Mitchell (Emma Barton). However, it is at this event that Grant notices Phil has relapsed, and he confronts him about it. At the same time, Grant gets reacquainted with Sharon and comes face-to-face with Bianca for the first time in nearly 25 years. Linda Carter (Kellie Bright) finds suicide notes in Phil's house, and with Grant and Nigel, they rush to the garage, where they find Phil about to kill himself. Although Grant manages to disarm him, he struggles to cope with the gravity of the situation. Afterwards, Nigel chastises Grant for failing to support Phil during his illness and insists on taking him back to the garage, where Phil is being taken to a mental health clinic. Ultimately, Grant is unable to accompany him. Following an encounter with Phil where he is disowned, Grant attempts to help Nigel, who expresses his desire to die on his own terms. Grant laters leaves Walford after making amends with Nigel.

Grant again returns to Walford in April 2026, after receiving a phone call from Mark (Stephen Aaron-Sipple), concerning Nigel's worsening condition and is shocked to discover he will die soon. Grant manages to convince a struggling Phil to visit Nigel one last time and is devastated to discover Nigel has died that same night. Grant then hopes to bond with Mark, despite the latter's resistance, and attempts to help Linda mend her relationship with her son, Johnny (Charlie Suff). Grant discovers Mark is in serious debt to crime boss Russell Delaney (Anthony Skordi), with whom Grant has history. Delaney doubles Mark's debt and threatens to kill him if Grant does not pay and ultimately kidnaps Mark. Grant successfully partners with Billy, Phil, and Sam to trick Russell to rescue Mark. Despite Mark being grateful, he continues to refuse Grant's attempts to bond with him due to what Michelle told him about his history. Grant steps up to cover for Mark when Max and Cindy Beale (Michelle Collins) confront him over destroying cars belonging to Max's daughter, Lauren (Jacqueline Jossa). Subsequently, Grant and Sam leave Walford for Portugal.

== Reception ==
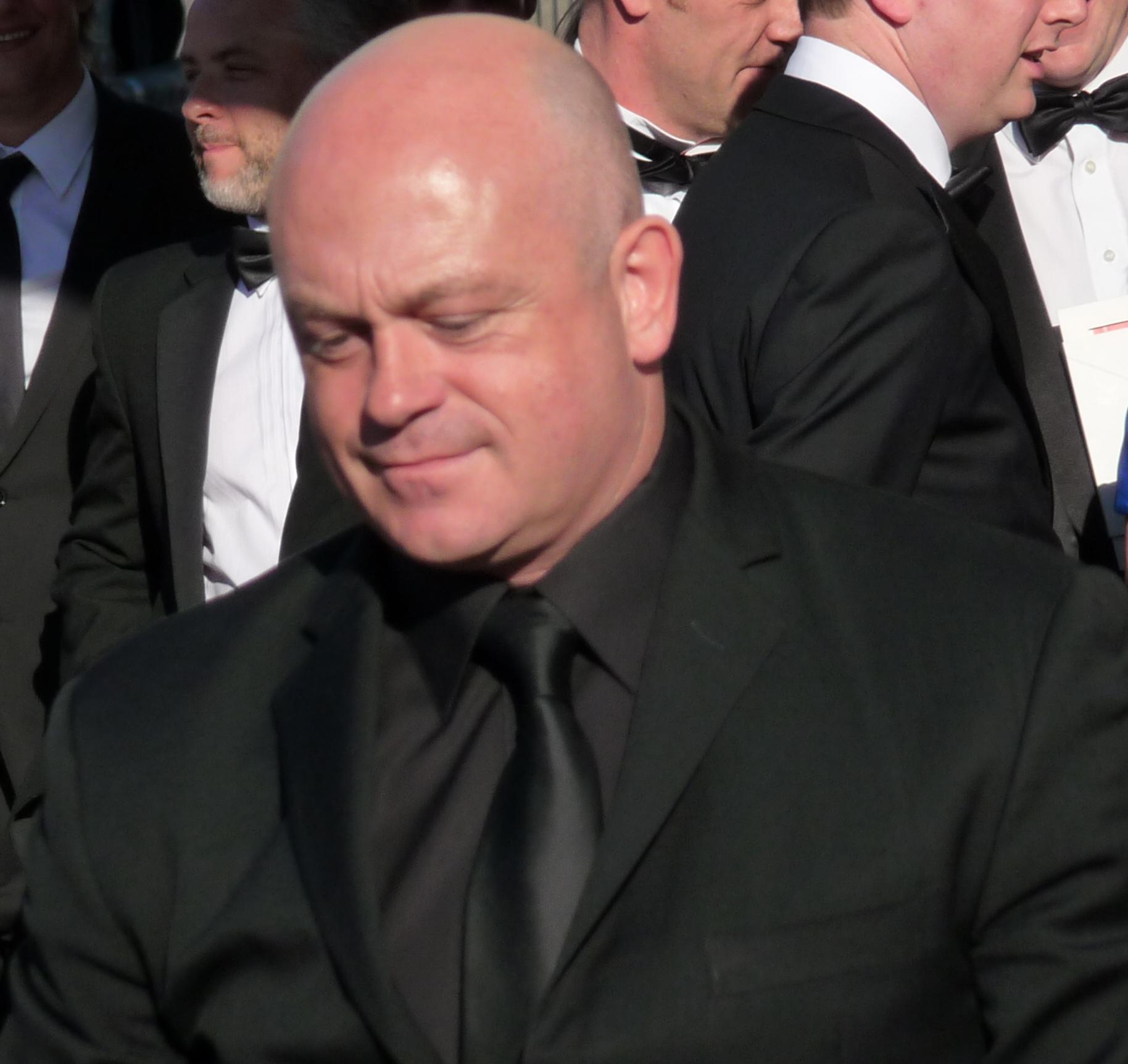
Ross Kemp's portrayal of Grant has led to the character becoming "one of the most iconic and popular in the history of soap".

The character of Grant Mitchell has been hailed as "one of the most iconic and popular in the history of soap". In a study by the Stirling Media Research Institute called Men Viewing Violence, participants branded Grant "a fascinating character" because of his complexity and likened him and Phil to a soap operatic version of the notorious East End criminals, the Kray Twins. He has become one of EastEnders biggest sex-symbols – described by the magazine Women Republic as "an ideal bit of rough... the antithesis to the pretty boys who spend longer in front of the mirror than we do." He was also voted the second most hunky man in British soap by gay readers of the magazine, attitude, who described him as "a dashing big, bad bully boy." In addition, Grant and Phil were voted as the second most popular King Of Soaps in a Channel 4 poll in 2002 and Grant was voted as one of the Top Ten TV Hard Men in a separate poll.

Grant's long-awaited return eventually happened in 2005, during a period of heavy media criticism aimed at EastEnders. The character was reintroduced along with his brother Phil. Of the Mitchell brothers' highly publicised return, one reporter commented "Soapville must confess that we did get goosebumps and feel properly excited when we first saw the Mitchell Brothers back on the Square... After all, you associate them with the golden days of Enders". Their return was voted as one of the Golden TV Moments of 2005 in a BBC poll.

Kemp has won several awards for his role as Grant. He was named 'Best Actor' at the 1999 and 2006 British Soap Awards, as well as the 1998 TV Quick and TV Choice Awards. Collecting his award, he commented: "People have a go at all soaps, but the people you see on screen are giving their all 52 weeks a year." Kemp also received 'Most Popular Actor' nominations at the 1996, 1997, 1998 and 2006 National Television Awards, and British Soap Award nominations for 'Villain of the Year' in 1999, and 'Spectacular Scene of the Year' in 2006, for Grant's brush with death in 'Get Johnny Week'.

The character has been the focus of varying EastEnders merchandise in other media, which includes the VHS EastEnders – The Mitchells – Naked Truths and EastEnders: Blood Ties – The Life and Loves of Grant Mitchell, a novelisation written by Kate Lock, which chronicles facts about the character, explores his background and attempts to explain the source of his aggression and vulnerability.

In 2009, a poll by magazine Inside Soap named Grant as the UK's favourite leading male character in a soap opera.

Although popular with many viewers, the character has garnered criticism, mainly regarding the way his anti-social behaviour is sensationalised by the programme makers. In November 2005 the character was blamed for turning children into playground bullies by Dr. Sally Henry, who claimed that impressionable children look to male soap characters as role models and subsequently copy their violent behaviour.

In addition, the character's predisposition to violence has allegedly been criticised by actor Ross Kemp. In 1998, press reports claimed that Kemp had asked producers to tone down Grant's violent behaviour because "it was insulting the viewers' intelligence."

Grant and Phil's brotherly confrontation – marking Grant's initial exit in 1999 – was panned by critics. Ian Hyland of the Sunday Mirror branded the storyline a "farce... hardly a fitting exit for Walford's dodgiest geezer since Dirty Den." He mocked the episode's stunts, commenting: "There are so many post-watershed dramas on TV that do these kind of scenes properly that Phil and Grant ended up looking like two little kids playing on a building site. Instead of wasting all their time on this ridiculous ending they could have made it a heart-wrenching farewell..."

There were mixed reviews for the highly publicised storyline (dubbed "Get Johnny Week") involving the Mitchell brothers reunion in 2006. It was criticised as "patchy" and "awkwardly written... unveiling a common weakness in the EastEnders camp, that character continuity can often fall by the wayside when you are dealing with larger characters". Additionally, the show was criticised for turning the brothers into a comical farce by incorporating uncharacteristic humour into their dialect, which was described as "cringeworthy".
