= Andrew Lynford =

British television presenter and actor (born 1972)

- Born: 14 June 1972 (age 54); Grays, Essex, England
- Occupations: Director, Manager, Actor

Andrew Lynford (born 14 June 1972) is a British television presenter and former actor. Since 2010, he has worked extensively as a theatre & television director, talent agent and casting director. He played Simon Raymond, the brother of Tiffany Mitchell (Martine McCutcheon), in the popular BBC soap opera EastEnders. He also presented Playdays for Children's BBC in the early 1990s.

== Career ==
Born in Essex, Lynford trained at the Mountview Academy of Theatre Arts in London. He has had many theatre roles, including Ralph in Bouncers; Tim in Up on the Roof, Adrian in The Secret Diary of Adrian Mole and Hal in Loot. He is also a veteran) of musical theatre, starring in The Little Shop of Horrors; Oliver!; The King & I and Anything Goes.

In 1996 Lynford joined the cast of EastEnders, playing Simon Raymond, the homosexual brother of Martine McCutcheon's character Tiffany Raymond. His character made headlines in the British press, following a gay kiss with the show's resident bisexual, Tony Hills (Mark Homer), who happened to be dating his sister at the time. Both Lynford and Homer left the show in 1999.

After leaving EastEnders, Lynford started presenting various shows for television, including Wild Thing, Taste Today, and the comedy quiz Arty Facts, which he also devised.

Lynford has also written a 1970s musical called Disco Crazee, which was produced by Bruce James in 2005 at the Edinburgh Festival, and subsequently toured Britain. More recently, Lynford directed The Cheeky Chappie, a play about the comedian Max Miller, Side By Side By Sondheim and Ken Hill's The Curse of the Werewolf at the Union Theatre in London. In 2006/7/8 he directed the comedy Dirty Dusting at the Gaiety Theatre, Dublin, and on tour in Ireland and Scotland, and in 2008, Menopause – The Musical at the Tivoli Theatre, Dublin, and on tour. In 2009, he directed Menopause – The Musical on tour in the UK. He has worked as a theatre producer for Paul Holman Associates. He directed the UK theatre productions of Mum's The Word and Alf Ramsey Knew My Grandfather for producer Robert C. Kelly.

He has contributed as a writer to the sketch show Tittybangbang and written gags for Dick and Dom for the Sky One quiz Are You Smarter Than a Ten-Year-Old?. He has also scripted many pantomimes across the UK.

As of 2013, Andrew continued to direct theatre, including productions of Wuthering Heights (with Emmerdale's Adele Silva and his EastEnders co-star Mark Homer in the cast), the UK tour of the Nell Dunn play Steaming and Christmas shows for Qdos Entertainment.

He is chairman and artist manager for the Spaniel Talent House, who produce and manage the band Skip Ad.

Lynford was casting director at Center Theatre Group in Los Angeles, California, US, and returned to the UK in 2019 to take up the role of head of casting at leading UK theatre company Bill Kenwright Ltd).
