= Gianni di Marco =

Fictional character from the BBC soap opera EastEnders

- EastEnders character
- Portrayed by: Marc Bannerman
- Duration: 1998–2000
- First appearance: Episode 1568; 29 January 1998
- Last appearance: Episode 1983; 3 August 2000
- Introduced by: Jane Harris
In-universe information
- Occupation: Chef
- Father: Giuseppe di Marco
- Mother: Rosa di Marco
- Brothers: Beppe di Marco
- Sisters: Teresa di Marco; Nicky di Marco
- Grandfathers: Bruno di Marco
- Grandmothers: Luisa di Marco
- Nephews: Joe di Marco
- First cousins: Luca di Marco

Gianni di Marco is a fictional character from the BBC serial drama EastEnders, played by Marc Bannerman from 1998 to 2000.

Throughout his time on the show, the character mostly contributed to his family's story arc since their first arrival on 26 January 1998. This involves Gianni developing a close interaction with his older brother Beppe di Marco (Michael Greco); managing their late father's restaurant in light of his funeral; becoming enemies with Beppe's sworn nemesis Grant Mitchell (Ross Kemp); briefly dating local businesswoman Annie Palmer (Nadia Sawalha); a broken relationship with fellow resident Jackie Owen (Race Davies) after she leaves the square with her criminal brother Steve (Martin Kemp); sparking clashes with Grant's brother Phil (Steve McFadden) and his best-friend Dan Sullivan (Craig Fairbrass); and nearly being charged in police custody for attacking his sister's maths tutor, Rod Morris (Forbes Masson), under the guise that he assaulted them. Eventually, Gianni departed the programme along with the majority of his family on 3 August 2000.

== Character creation and development ==
The Italian di Marco family were introduced early in 1998 by Series Producer Jane Harris. The di Marcos were a family of eight, consisting of grandparents Bruno and Luisa (Leon Lissek and Stella Tanner), their daughter-in-law Rosa (Louise Jameson), her children Beppe, Gianni, Teresa and Nicky, and Beppe's young son Joe. They were heralded as the "family that would rival the Mitchells", one of the most successful and long-running families to have been featured in EastEnders.

According to author Rupert Smith, the di Marcos "landed with an almighty thud in January [1998], turning out in force for the funeral of patriarch Giuseppe", who was Rosa's husband and an old business associate of the character George Palmer. The following month, the family moved to the area in which the soap is set, Walford, to run an Italian restaurant, which was named Giuseppe's.

The di Marcos remained with the show as a unit until 2000, when the new executive producer, John Yorke, decided to cull the majority of the family. All except Beppe and his son Joe were written out. They were reportedly "slaughtered because of a shortage of ideas for what to do with them". A source allegedly told The Mirror: "It's always unpleasant having to say goodbye to people who have given loyal service to the show for a number of years. But John Yorke feels it's time to make his mark on the show. Every new producer likes to do the same. John wants to introduce a new family later this year and felt the Di Marcos had nowhere else to go. Their storylines were beginning to feel tired and that's a good time to make such a drastic change." However an official BBC spokesperson at the time commented: "These changes […] are just part of [John Yorke's] plans to revamp the series and give it a new look." The cuts paved the way for the arrival of the popular Slater family. Beppe and Joe remained until 2002, when they were axed too.

== Storylines ==
Gianni Di Marco first arrived in Albert Square - the local community in Walford, a fictionalized borough in East London - along with the rest of his family in January 1998. He is the younger of the two brothers in the family, the other being Beppe (Michael Greco). They have two younger sisters, Teresa (Leila Birch) and Nicky (Carly Hillman). Gianni works as a chef in the family restaurant, Giuseppe's, named after his late father. He later becomes the manager of the restaurant.

During his time on the square, Gianni sparks relationships that all end in disaster. This begins with him dating local businesswoman Annie Palmer (Nadia Sawalha), which is stopped when there are doubts over whether Gianni's real father is actually Annie's father George (Paul Moriarty). DNA tests prove Gianni really is a di Marco, but his relationship with Annie doesn't continue. He then has a relationship with fellow resident Jackie Owen (Race Davies), but discovers that she suffers from severe PMT, and this makes their relationship more and more difficult when Gianni has to put up with Jackie's violent temper and foul moods. Eventually, Jackie leaves Walford with her criminal brother Steve (Martin Kemp) and her relationship with Gianni is over. Gianni later began a brief affair with one of his neighbors, Louise Raymond (Carol Harrison), but it isn't anything more than a casual fling.

By then, Gianni has found himself drawn in an ongoing feud between Beppe and his sworn enemy Grant Mitchell (Ross Kemp. This continues when Grant's brother Phil (Steve McFadden) gets involved in the conflict, whereupon the two groups of brothers appear to have a rivalry over several interests. At one point in The Queen Victoria public house, Gianni grows irritated when he finds Teresa romancing with Phil's best-friend Dan Sullivan (Craig Fairbrass) - not long after he was revealed to have cheated on his girlfriend Carol Jackson (Lindsey Coulson) with her daughter Bianca (Patsy Palmer); the mother-and-duo consequently left the square on their own alongside Bianca's beloved husband Ricky Butcher (Sid Owen). When Gianni confronts Dan to warn him in staying away from Teresa over threatening circumstances, Dan rebuffs him until Gianni throws a drink at him. The pair nearly brawl until Gianni is forced to leave the pub.

Later on, Gianni attacks Nicky's maths teacher Rod Morris (Forbes Masson) after she claims that he assaulted her. Rod presses charges of assault but later drops them. Gianni and the rest of his family leave Walford in August 2000 to start a new life in Leicester, living with their uncle Franco - leaving Beppe and his son Joe (Jake Kyprianou) in Walford.

== Reception ==
The di Marcos are now deemed as something of a failure for EastEnders. Since their departure, the family has even been mocked in an EastEnders official book, entitled EastEnders 20 Years In Albert Square. In the book, the author, Rupert Smith, writes :"Nobody really knew what to do with the di Marco family, who had been languishing in the pizza restaurant without a decent storyline between them. Finally, there was nothing else for it: the di Marcos would have to go. All of them…it was as if they'd never been".

Matthew Baylis of The Guardian has commented on their lack of success: "Thank heaven for off-screen uncles. As we saw during the hurried departure of the di Marco family from Albert Square, there's nothing like a fictitious relative when you need to get characters off the screen…The di Marcos' departure had its dodgy elements. A hitherto unheard-of uncle needs help in his restaurant, so the whole family ups sticks. Including Teresa - who'd always fought for independence from her family? Rosa, who presumably owned the house she'd transformed into something resembling an Imperial Palace, is suddenly prepared to leg it with a couple of suitcases? There was plenty that didn't ring true. But few viewers minded. There was, if anything, more sympathy for the programme-makers, trying valiantly to dispose of this singularly unpopular family while retaining an element of drama."

The di Marcos have been dismissed as "unconvincing characters". Baylis goes on to highlight a problem that he feels "dogged the whole family", their occupation as restaurateurs. Baylis believes this kept them "self-contained", and prevented them from establishing meaningful links with other characters. He explains: "[The di Marcos] had an ambiguity, heightened by the job they did. Soapland has no place for grey areas. Bad things happen to bad people. They also happen to good people, of course, but not for very long. To make this predictable universe work on the screen, you need characters who are relatively stable (even if they are unstable). The writers and the viewers buy into a myth that people aren't particularly complex, that the full range of their feelings and actions can be revealed in a few hours on the TV. And a quick, visible way of revealing characters is to mirror them in their occupation. Thus we have Pauline Fowler, long-suffering drudge and matriarch. What better job than folding pants all day in the launderette? Or Peggy [Mitchell] - tough but fun-loving and gregarious. So she runs the pub. But what attributes spring to mind when we think of Italian restaurants? Fond of pasta, perhaps? Permanently overworked? The job never provided an easy route into understanding the di Marcos' characters…The most visible jobs tend to be taken by the strongest, most vivid characters. Confined to their restaurant, the di Marcos could only become involved in Walford life when other characters came over to eat a carbonara. And how often do working-class East End people do that? If any di Marco wanted a night out, a pint in the Vic, a clandestine liaison, then an excuse had to be found as to why they weren't working. Transforming Giuseppe's into a daytime sandwich bar, and sending Teresa onto the market were bold rescue attempts, but they came too late. The viewers had already decided they didn't much care…Because of their jobs, the di Marcos became a largely self-contained unit…"
