= List of EastEnders characters introduced in 1999 =

EastEnders logo

The following is a list of characters that first appeared in the BBC soap opera EastEnders in 1999, by order of first appearance. Many were introduced by the show's executive producer, Matthew Robinson.

== Nina Harris ==
Nina Harris, played by Troy Titus-Adams, appears between 1999 and 2000. The character was axed by John Yorke, making her final appearance in June 2000. Titus-Adams was critical about the lack of material given to her, accusing the BBC of tokenism. Nina arrives in Walford looking for a fresh start away from her past as a prostitute. Nina helped imprison her violent pimp Vinny, a former boyfriend who had got her addicted to drugs and then persuaded her to turn to prostitution so she could feed their habit. Nina stays with her aunt Irene Raymond (Roberta Taylor) and settles in by becoming a barmaid in The Queen Victoria public house.

== Claudia Fielding ==
Claudia Fielding
- EastEnders character
- Portrayed by: Romla Walker
- First appearance: Episode 1742; 23 February 1999
- Last appearance: Episode 1844; 5 October 1999
In-universe information
- Sisters: Saskia Duncan

Claudia Fielding (née Duncan), played by Romla Walker, is the sister of Saskia Duncan (Deborah Sheridan-Taylor), who arrives in Walford after her sister's death on 14 February 1999. She arrives in Walford as it was the last place Saskia was seen, and her disappearance is being investigated by the police. Claudia is suspicious of Steve Owen (Martin Kemp), her sister's former fiancé (and killer), but then becomes dependent on him, alternating between the two and irritating Steve. Matthew Rose (Joe Absolom), who witnessed Saskia's death, is worried that Claudia will discover that her sister is dead. She eventually returns home after Saskia's body is found buried in Epping Forest. Claudia testifies at Steve's trial and is devastated when he is cleared of Saskia's murder, with Matthew found guilty instead.

After Matthew wins an appeal against his sentence and returns to Walford to get his revenge on Steve, he claims to have murdered Claudia and planted evidence to frame Steve. Matthew later reveals this was merely a ruse to scare Steve.

== Dan Sullivan ==
Dan Sullivan, played by Craig Fairbrass, arrives in Albert Square as Carol Jackson (Lindsey Coulson)'s latest boyfriend in 1999 and they plan to marry on discovering she is expecting his child. Carol's daughter Bianca Butcher (Patsy Palmer) is stunned to see him, as they had a fling when she was a teenager on holiday, many years before. Dan and Bianca begin an affair, which is discovered, leading Carol to have an abortion and leave Walford. Bianca also leaves Walford.

== Susie Price ==
Susie Price
- EastEnders character
- Portrayed by: Viva Duce
- First appearance: Episode 1821; 17 August 1999
- Last appearance: Episode 1988; 31 December 1999
In-universe information
- Occupation: Hairdresser
- Father: Dave Price
- Mother: Andrea Price
- Brothers: Jack Price; Kevin Price
- Sisters: Natalie Evans
- Husband: Chris
- Sons: Darren
- Nephews: Jack Evans

Susie Price, played by Viva Duce, is the older sister of Natalie Price (Lucy Speed) and she is first seen in EastEnders in August 1999, when Natalie, who has been estranged from her family for some time, returns to her family home to introduce her new fiancé, Barry Evans (Shaun Williamson). Natalie and Susie do not get along. Their mother, Andrea (Cindy O'Callaghan), had always favoured Susie, and the two of them like nothing better than to pick holes in Natalie. Susie is angry with Natalie because she has been absent for several years and she constantly jibes Natalie about her appearance and how unattractive Barry is. Susie's last appearance is in December 1999, when she attends Natalie and Barry's wedding.

== Jackie Owen ==
Jackie Owen
- EastEnders character
- Portrayed by: Race Davies
- Duration: 1999–2000
- First appearance: Episode 1833; 10 September 1999
- Last appearance: Episode 1956; 1 June 2000
- Introduced by: Matthew Robinson
In-universe information
- Other names: Jackie Bayliss
- Occupation: Waitress
- Father: Richard Owen
- Mother: Barbara Owen
- Brothers: Steve Owen
- Husband: Doug Bayliss (backstory)
- Nephews: Hunter Owen

Jackie Owen (also Bayliss), played by Race Davies, appears from 1999 to 2000. Davies quit the role in 2000 after only four months on the soap. She commented, "I've really enjoyed myself working on EastEnders but I feel that I've done as much as I can on the show and I'm looking forward to new challenges."

Jackie arrives in Walford in September 1999, looking for her brother, Steve (Martin Kemp), after hearing that he is to stand trial for murdering Saskia Duncan (Deborah Sheridan-Taylor). Jackie's husband, Doug (a hotelier and club owner), was sent to prison for manslaughter after accidentally killing a violent punter. Whilst there, he committed suicide, so Jackie is determined that her brother will not share the same fate.

Jackie believes her brother is innocent, but aware of the hostility towards him in the Square, she initially refrains from revealing her connection to him. She takes a job as a waitress at Giuseppe's Italian restaurant, owned by the di Marco family. In between shifts, Jackie starts questioning the residents of Walford about Steve, hoping to find something that will exonerate him. When Gianni di Marco (Marc Bannerman) discovers a prison visiting order in Jackie's belongings, he reveals her true identity, infuriating the locals. During Steve's trial, Jackie realises that Steve is lying about murdering Saskia. She is furious but still gives tearful and moving testimony that undoubtedly sways the jury in Steve's favour and probably buys his freedom. Steve is found not guilty, whilst Matthew Rose (Joe Absolom), whom Steve has framed, is found guilty of manslaughter and is sent to prison for a crime he didn't commit.

Jackie and Steve are the targets of regular animosity on the Square, regarding Steve's actions. Martin Fowler (James Alexandrou) in particular, has it in for Jackie, and after goading her in the restaurant one day, Jackie finally loses it and fiercely orders him to leave. Martin proceeds to steal a customer's money from a nearby table and then does a runner. Jackie and Gianni follow him into a half-demolished building and as Martin looks back from outside, he hears Jackie shriek as a huge piece of piping falls towards her. Jackie is trapped but awake and Gianni lays half-conscious beside her. Whilst they wait to be rescued, they begin sharing life stories and begin to bond. The firemen have difficulty moving the debris as any wrong move could bring the whole roof down. Amidst all the chaos, Jackie and Gianni manage to kill time by flirting and just as the two lean in to kiss, the roof collapses. Steve rushes into the building to save them and neither is badly injured.

Over the following months, Jackie gets involved with the free Matthew Rose campaign, possibly to relieve her guilt for her part in his imprisonment. She and Gianni begin a relationship and it seems as if the womanising Italian is really falling for Jackie. However, Jackie isn't the easiest woman to please. She has a quick temper and a jealous streak and as time goes by, these tendencies became more and more apparent. Jackie begins taking everything Gianni says the wrong way, resulting in screaming matches for seemingly no reason. After Jackie manages to scald Gianni by tipping hot coffee over him in a fit of rage, she finally explains she suffers with severe Premenstrual Tension (PMS) for a week every month which makes her enraged and violent. Gianni is uncharacteristically sympathetic and he tries making allowances for Jackie's behaviour. Later, after injuring Gianni by punching him in the face and smashing up the restaurant, Jackie seeks medical help. She is given medication and hopes that this will solve her problem but it doesn't. After hitting Gianni with a saucepan one night, Jackie decides to end the relationship as she cannot stand the thought of harming him. Gianni is stunned, as he has fallen deeply in love with her. Gianni makes one last attempt to save their relationship, but when his mother, Rosa (Louise Jameson), discovers the abuse Jackie has put him through, she forbids Jackie from having anything more to do with him.

Jackie leaves Walford after learning of her brother's drug habit in June 2000. Steve returns from rehab alone. When their mother, Barbara (Sheila Hancock), falls ill a year later, she relays that Jackie has refused to help her and it is subsequently revealed that they hate each other. Jackie refuses to attend her funeral in 2001 and doesn't attend Steve's funeral in 2002 either. In April 2002, Steve's widow, Mel Owen (Tamzin Outhwaite), discovers she and Jackie are being investigated by the police for money laundering and drug trafficking. Steve was actually guilty of these crimes but had set them up as company directors of his illegitimate businesses, and following his death, they are held accountable.

== Troy Harvey ==
Troy Harvey
- EastEnders character
- Portrayed by: Jamie Jarvis
- First appearance: Episode 1837; 20 September 1999
- Last appearance: Episode 1883; 25 December 1999
In-universe information
- Brothers: Wilf Harvey

Troy Harvey, played by Jamie Jarvis, is a friend of Tony Hills (Mark Homer), who had attended school with his older brother. Troy arrives in Albert Square looking for Tony, but has missed him as he has gone to Amsterdam with his boyfriend and stepbrother, Simon Raymond (Andrew Lynford).

Troy begins staying with Tony's mother Irene Raymond (Roberta Taylor) and her husband Terry (Gavin Richards) at 87 George Street and begins helping out in their shop. It becomes apparent that Troy is attracted to Irene and begins flirting with her. Soon the two of them begin an illicit affair, behind Terry's back. The affair ends on Christmas Day 1999 when Terry learns through Irene's friend Rosa di Marco (Louise Jameson), who Troy had previously tried it on with, that his wife is cheating on him. After punching Troy, Terry offers Irene to him, stating that he loves her enough to give her up and let her be with Troy if that is what she wants. However, seeing that Troy is unwilling to accept Irene, Terry throws him out of the house and threatens to kill him if he ever attempts to contact Irene or shows his face again.

== Asif Malik ==
Asif Malik
- EastEnders character
- Portrayed by: Ashvin Luximon
- Duration: 1999–2003
- First appearance: Episode 1838; 21 September 1999
- Last appearance: Episode 2601; 10 October 2003
In-universe information
- Occupation: Student

Asif Malik, played by Ashvin Luximon from 1999 to 2003, is a school friend of Martin Fowler (James Alexandrou). Together they get into much trouble such as shoplifting and vandalism, getting into trouble with Steve Owen (Martin Kemp), but almost always when Martin is caught, Asif leaves him behind to explain himself to his mother Pauline (Wendy Richard). His own family are never seen on-screen but are mentioned occasionally.

He rarely has storylines which centre only on him and all his storylines are linked with Martin or with his fellow schoolmates Nicky di Marco (Carly Hillman) and Janine Butcher (Charlie Brooks). He goes on a few dates with Nicky but it doesn't turn into anything serious. He also has a crush on Janine which is not reciprocated. He is last seen in October 2003 when he passes his A-levels and goes to university. He has not appeared since. It is revealed in 2004 that Asif is living in Edinburgh and is getting married; he invites Martin to his stag party off-screen.

== Enrico di Clemente ==
Enrico di Clemente
- EastEnders character
- Portrayed by: Francois Pandolfo
- First appearance: Episode 1842; 30 September 1999
- Last appearance: Episode 1855; 28 October 1999
In-universe information
- Occupation: Student

Enrico di Clemente, played by Francois Pandolfo, is an Italian foreign exchange student, who stays with the Fowler family in 1999. He makes a big impression on Sonia Jackson (Natalie Cassidy), particularly when she discovers that he is a fellow trumpet player with a penchant for jazz music. However, he also receives a lot of unwanted attention from Sonia's friend, Nicky di Marco (Carly Hillman), which causes several arguments.

Sonia is sure that Enrico prefers Nicky and so she shuns him when he asks her on a date. Nicky eventually grows tired of Enrico constantly talking about Sonia, so she tells him to tell her how he feels. He does, and Sonia is overjoyed. However their romance is short-lived, as Enrico returns home to Italy the following day, but not before he takes her for a romantic meal and a dance at Giuseppe's Italian restaurant. They share a kiss, and Sonia confesses that it had been her first.

== Others ==
Character	Date(s)	Actor	Circumstances
Luca di Marco	18-23 March (3 episodes)	Graham McGrath	Luca is a cousin of Beppe di Marco (Michael Greco), Gianni di Marco (Marc Bannerman), Teresa di Marco (Leila Birch) and Nicky di Marco (Carly Hillman). He arrives to help at the family restaurant, Giuseppe's. Sarah Hills (Daniela Denby-Ashe) takes an interest in him but after one date he dumps her when she goes cold on him after he comes on too strong. Sarah's brother, Tony (Mark Homer) is enraged and confronts Luca. Luca winds Tony up by saying Sarah was desperate, resulting in Tony punching him. The fight is broken up by Gianni and Beppe. Luca further goads Tony by saying Sarah wasn't worth the effort, prompting him to throw a chair through the restaurant window. Tony is arrested and charged with criminal damage. Luca then accosts Sarah in the market calling her a tease and she knees him in the groin. Luca's aunt Rosa di Marco (Louise Jameson) then orders him to leave, which he does. Luca is last mentioned on the day that Rosa, Gianni, Teresa and Nicky depart Walford when Teresa reveals that Luca has got a waitress pregnant and has then run off, leaving Uncle Franco in Leicester with no chef, which facilitates a move to Leicester for the di Marcos.
Gareth Wiley	15–21 April (3 episodes)	Gareth Corke	
Jack Price	16–19 August (3 episodes)	Dax O'Callaghan	The young brother of Natalie Price (Lucy Speed). Jack appears when Natalie takes her new fiancé, Barry (Shaun Williamson), to visit their mother, Andrea Price (Cindy O'Callaghan). Jack is a talented footballer and has just been offered a scholarship with Liverpool F.C., a fact that Barry is unaware of. Jack manages to use this to his advantage when he cons Barry into betting him a pound for every minute he manages to keep a football in the air. Over half an hour later, Jack has still not dropped the ball and Barry is forced to pay a sizeable sum.
Jane Healy	31 December (2 episodes)	Shirley Stelfox	The mother of Mel Healy (Tamzin Outhwaite) who attends her wedding to Ian Beale (Adam Woodyatt) on New Year's Eve. Jane spends much of the day bickering with her ex-husband Jeff Healy (Leslie Schofield). She then reveals to Mel that she is still in love with Jeff and misses him. Twenty years later, Mel reveals that Jane has died.
