= List of EastEnders characters introduced in 1998 =

EastEnders logo

The following is a list of characters that first appeared in the BBC soap opera EastEnders in 1998, by order of first appearance.

== Lola Christie ==
Lola Christie
- EastEnders character
- Portrayed by: Diane Parish
- First appearance: Episode 1565; 22 January 1998
- Last appearance: Episode 1636; 6 July 1998
In-universe information
- Occupation: Singer
- Sons: Carl Christie

Lola Christie is played by Diane Parish. Lola was introduced as a love interest for Mick McFarlane (Sylvester Williams). Parish notably returned to EastEnders in 2006 playing a different character, Denise Fox.

Lola Christie auditions as a singer for Mick's band. Mick is impressed with her singing talents and offers her the job. Mick is attracted to Lola, they start dating, but she is always rushing off without warning and Mick is surprised to discover that Lola has a secret young son named Carl (Stacey Wright; son of Ian) whose father, Neil, had abandoned Lola when she was 5 months pregnant. Mick proves supportive, but Lola eventually leaves Mick and the band when she gets her own recording contract as a soloist.

=== Creation ===
At the time, Lola was the highest profile role for actress Diane Parish. The character was a singer in Mick's jazz band; Parish had worked her way through drama school at RADA by doing session singing at a recording studio, though she had never seriously considered singing as a career. Parish has commented, "The only reason I took on the role of Lola was because her storyline wasn't really to do with her singing, that was just incidental. There was a bit of interest at the time – but I have to confess I didn't exactly have Island Records beating my door down with a contract!". In a televised interview in 2020, Parish described the singing aspect of the role as "excruciating", claiming it made her unsuited to play Lola.

Following the end of her initial six-month contract, Parish decided to leave EastEnders. In a 1998 interview she revealed, "I had made a decision that I would stay only six months, whatever happened. But I was tempted to stay longer because it is such a great show and lovely people. Leaving was like ripping away from real friendships – but I'm not in this business to settle down. I get itchy feet and I left to do Picking Up the Pieces which is a real challenge. Being a part of EastEnders is like nothing else, a whole different beast from other shows because practically everyone has watched it at some time and you get to be known wherever you go. I thought that would end when I left, but I still get it even now."

She has since revealed that she found it hard to cope with the fame of being in such a high-profile soap, and in a 2002 interview with the Daily Mirror it was reported that she "hated" her time in the soap so much, that she had no qualms about turning down a long-term contract: "I resented being a 'star' and I resented acting like one. It is cliquey, and once you are in a soap, that is it. The soap just clings on to you. People say: 'Everything you do before a soap and after does not matter.' It is true. EE made me odd. I was bobbing along happily as a jobbing actress, and then EE came along. I found it strange to lose my anonymity. People really believe they own you. They grab you, scream at you. I did not cope well. I became introverted and I stayed in a lot. I felt a bit depressed, too. I felt I had lost something. In the end I just had to get out. I lost the point as to why I was doing the job, and to be perfectly frank it just got messy." However, in the same interview, Parish said she would consider returning to EastEnders if they asked her: "I'd handle things better. I love watching it. Jim Branning is fab." Parish did return to the soap in 2006, but playing a completely different character, Denise Fox. On her decision to return, Parish said, "EastEnders was different back then. There was a spotlight on anyone in it – some actors were akin to pop stars. It's calmer now."

== Beppe di Marco ==
Beppe di Marco, played by Michael Greco, is first seen when local residents George Palmer (Paul Moriarty) and Peggy Mitchell (Barbara Windsor) attend his father's funeral. He soon moves to Albert Square with the rest of his family. Beppe is his family's pride and joy, so it is a big shock to them when he is fired from the police force for attempting to frame his sworn enemy and Peggy's youngest son Grant Mitchell (Ross Kemp) for GBH on his long-suffering wife Tiffany Raymond (Martine McCutcheon). The character Beppe is ta heart-throb and he becomes involved in numerous relationships, which of all ended in disaster.

== Bruno di Marco ==
Bruno di Marco, played by Leon Lissek, is the patriarch of the di Marco family. He moves to Albert Square with his family after the death of his son. Bruno's wife, Luisa (Stella Tanner) suffers a stroke shortly before Bruno's birthday in July 1998. She recovers but remains frail and in December Bruno and Luisa decide to take a trip to Italy, before it is too late. When they get there they like it so much that they decided to stay.

== Gianni di Marco ==
Gianni di Marco, played by Marc Bannerman, is Beppe di Marco's (Michael Greco) hotheaded younger brother. He works as a chef in the family restaurant, and later becomes manager of the business. Gianni has relationships with several women in Walford, and backs Beppe in various run-ins with Grant (Ross Kemp) and Phil Mitchell (Steve McFadden), as the two groups of brothers often have conflicts over several interests.

== Luisa di Marco ==
Luisa di Marco, played by Stella Tanner, is married to Bruno (Leon Lissek). She is often troubled by the antics of her grandchildren, and when she sees her youngest granddaughter Nicky (Carly Hillman) kissing Martin Fowler (James Alexandrou), the shock is too much and she suffers a stroke. She recovers but remains frail and in December Luisa and Bruno decide to take a trip to Italy before it was too late. When they get there they liked it so much that they decide to stay.

== Nicky di Marco ==
Nicky di Marco
- EastEnders character
- Portrayed by: Carly Hillman
- Duration: 1998–2000
- First appearance: Episode 1568; 29 January 1998
- Last appearance: Episode 1983; 3 August 2000
- Introduced by: Jane Harris
In-universe information
- Father: Giuseppe di Marco
- Mother: Rosa di Marco
- Brothers: Beppe di Marco; Gianni di Marco
- Sisters: Teresa di Marco
- Grandfathers: Bruno di Marco
- Grandmothers: Luisa di Marco
- Nephews: Joe di Marco
- First cousins: Luca di Marco

Nicoletta "Nicky" di Marco, played by Carly Hillman, arrives in Albert Square as a teenager with her mother Rosa (Louise Jameson), brothers Beppe and Gianni (Michael Greco and Marc Bannerman), and sister Teresa (Leila Birch) in 1998. Nicky becomes the best friend of Sonia Jackson (Natalie Cassidy) and briefly dates Jamie Mitchell (Jack Ryder), Asif Malik (Ashvin Luximon) and Martin Fowler (James Alexandrou).

In 2000, her mother Rosa arranges for some home maths lessons to help with Nicky's exams. Her tutor is Rod Morris (Forbes Masson), whom she falls in love with. Nicky makes the first move on her tutor and he initially reciprocates, but then takes things too far and sexually assaults Nicky, who then tells her family what has happened, but doesn't reveal she is partly to blame. This leads to her overprotective brother Gianni attacking Rod. Gianni is charged with assault but the charges are dropped when Nicky admits that she has not told the whole truth. Nicky then admits that she was afraid that her family wouldn't have believed that she had been molested if she had admitted she'd made the first move. When she realises her family have doubts of her innocence, she decides to leave home, and explains that she has received the address for a hostel. However, she returns when the Di Marcos (bar Beppe and Joe) decide to Walford leave for a new life in Leicester in August 2000. The charges against Rod are also dropped.

== Rosa di Marco ==
Rosa di Marco, played by Louise Jameson. She is the mother of Beppe (Michael Greco), Gianni (Marc Bannerman), Teresa (Leila Birch) and Nicky di Marco (Carly Hillman). After the death of her husband, she moves to Walford along with the rest of her family, and she soon sets up her own restaurant with the help of her old friend, George Palmer (Paul Moriarty). It is later revealed that Rosa and George had a fling many years ago during the time her husband was in prison. This leads George to believe that Rosa's son Gianni could be his son.

== Teresa di Marco ==
Teresa di Marco
- EastEnders character
- Portrayed by: Leila Birch
- Duration: 1998–2000
- First appearance: Episode 1568; 29 January 1998
- Last appearance: Episode 1983; 3 August 2000
- Introduced by: Jane Harris
In-universe information
- Occupation: Market stall holder
- Father: Giuseppe di Marco
- Mother: Rosa di Marco
- Brothers: Beppe di Marco; Gianni di Marco
- Sisters: Nicky di Marco
- Grandfathers: Bruno di Marco
- Grandmothers: Luisa di Marco
- Nephews: Joe di Marco
- First cousins: Luca di Marco

Teresa di Marco, played by Leila Birch, is Rosa di Marco (Louise Jameson)'s eldest daughter and a wild child, despite the fact she has her overprotective, big brothers Beppe and Gianni (Michael Greco and Marc Bannerman) looking out for her.

She first appears at her father's funeral in January 1998, and had recently failed her A-level exams, making her mother suspicious that she had done this on purpose, so she can stay as a waitress in the family restaurant. However, Teresa has higher aspirations than working in the family business, and so gets her own stall on the market.

Teresa also knows how to find trouble. She is caught with drugs by the police, finds out that her bisexual boyfriend Tony Hills (Mark Homer) had an affair with his ex-boyfriend Simon Raymond (Andrew Lynford). Teresa also had flings with Lenny Wallace (Desune Coleman) and the married Ricky Butcher (Sid Owen). Teresa then runs away with her then boyfriend, Matthew Rose (Joe Absolom), who is suspected of murdering Saskia Duncan. When they are finally found, Matthew is found guilty and Teresa is crushed. She campaigns to get him freed, and when he is the two are reunited, but his desire for revenge on the real murderer Steve Owen (Martin Kemp) scares her and they break up.

Following her sister Nicky (Carly Hillman)'s accusations of assault, most of the di Marcos decide to leave for Leicester and, after a heart to heart with brother Beppe, makes Teresa realise she needs a new start. She then joins her family and heads out of Walford.

== Joe di Marco ==
Joe di Marco
- EastEnders character
- Portrayed by: Jake Kyprianou
- Duration: 1998–2002
- First appearance: Episode 1568; 29 January 1998
- Last appearance: Episode 2274; 19 March 2002
- Introduced by: Jane Harris
In-universe information
- Occupation: Student
- Father: Beppe di Marco
- Mother: Sandra di Marco
- Grandfathers: Giuseppe di Marco
- Grandmothers: Rosa di Marco
- Uncles: Gianni di Marco
- Aunts: Teresa di Marco; Nicky di Marco
- Other relatives: Bruno di Marco; Luisa di Marco; Luca di Marco

Joe di Marco is played by Jake Kyprianou between 1998 and 2002. Joe's most notable storyline is being "the focus of a tug-of-love" between his mother and father. Joe, along with his father Beppe di Marco (Michael Greco), was axed by the executive producer of EastEnders, John Yorke.

The Italian di Marco family were introduced early in 1998 by executive producer Jane Harris. They were heralded as the "family that would rival the Mitchells"—who are one of the most successful and long-running families to have been featured in EastEnders.

The di Marcos "landed with an almighty thud in January [1998], turning out in force for the funeral of patriarch Giuseppe", Joe's grandfather. The following month, the family moved to the area in which the soap is set, Walford. Joe is featured in various storylines that focus on his relationship with his father, Beppe, and Beppe's struggles as a single parent. "There was a flurry of interest" in 2000, when Joe's estranged mother Sandra (Clare Wilkie) was introduced into the serial. She vows to take Beppe to court for custody of Joe, but after a lengthy battle, and a tug-of-love that leads to Joe getting injured, this does not occur. In the storyline, Joe remains with his father after Beppe agrees to give Sandra visitation rights.

The majority of the di Marcos stayed in EastEnders until 2000, when a new executive producer, John Yorke, decided to cull them all, except Joe, Beppe and his estranged wife Sandra (though she was also written out early in 2001 when the custody battle storyline ended). The di Marcos were reportedly "slaughtered because of a shortage of ideas for what to do with them." However, a spokesperson at the time commented: "These changes…are just part of [John Yorke's] plans to revamp the series and give it a new look." The cuts paved the way for the arrival of the "hugely popular" Slater family. Beppe and Joe remained until 2002, when they were also axed. The characters departed in June, two months earlier than contracted. This was due to Beppe's actor Michael Greco, who requested to be released early from his contract. The boy who played Joe, Jake Kyprianou, reportedly gave up acting after leaving the role. The di Marcos are now deemed as something of a failure for EastEnders.

=== Storylines ===
Joe di Marco is the son of Beppe and Sandra di Marco (Michael Greco and Clare Wilkie). Sandra abandoned Joe when he was young due to Beppe's interfering family. Joe was raised by his father, his grandmother Rosa (Louise Jameson) and his great grandmother Luisa (Stella Tanner).

Sandra comes back into Joe's life in 2000. He bonds with his mother, and despite initial hostilities Beppe also welcomes Sandra back into his life. However it transpires that Sandra is only using Beppe to get access to Joe and she later reconciles with her former lover, Jack Robins (Chook Sibtain). She and Jack plan to abscond with Joe, however Beppe catches her in the act. Beppe and Sandra are then involved in a custody battle for Joe. The constant rowing has a negative effect on Joe and he finds it difficult to choose between his warring parents. This culminates in him getting hit by a car when he disobeys his father and runs across the road to be with his mother. Joe is not seriously hurt, but the accident makes his parents rethink their behaviour. Beppe eventually allows Sandra visitation rights and Joe remains with his father.

Beppe's serial womanising has a negative effect on Joe in 2001, when he walks in on his father being seduced by his teacher, Kay Bradshaw (Vanessa Earl). Joe is so unsettled that he refuses to go to school the following day. In 2002, Joe leaves with his father to live in Leicester following Rosa's death.

== Nicole Moore ==
Nicole Moore
- EastEnders character
- Portrayed by: Sara Stephens
- First appearance: Episode 1570; 3 February 1998
- Last appearance: Episode 1610; 5 May 1998
In-universe information
- Daughters: Jessie Moore

Nicole Moore is played by Sara Stephens. She is the mother of Jessie Moore (Chelsey Padden), the foster daughter of Mark (Todd Carty) and Ruth Fowler (Caroline Paterson).

Nicole was in prison, and asks her solicitor if she can see her daughter Jessie whilst in prison. Mark and Ruth initially refuse, but Nicole was granted her wish. Mark and Ruth later hear from their solicitor that Nicole will be released in a couple of weeks time, and will be granted permission to see Jessie once a fortnight. Mark and Ruth are devastated by this, and are forced to face the fact that Jessie may not be with them for much longer.

On Jessie's birthday, Mark and Ruth host a party for her. Nicole turns up at the party, leaving Mark and Ruth furious. However, Jessie is over the moon to see her mother. Mark later asks his solicitor if Nicole was allowed to walk in like that, and his solicitor explains that this should have been done through social services first.

Ruth later takes pity on Nicole the next time she visits, when she explains that she is getting herself together and cannot wait to be reconciled with her daughter. Ruth allows her to visit whenever she likes, things gets heavy and Nicole oversteps the Mark by Kidnapping Jessie but Connor and Mark gets her back Nicole is refused any access to Jessie by losing her to Mark and Ruth but later goes back into a hostel

== Eliot Saunders ==
Eliot Saunders
- EastEnders character
- Portrayed by: Lawrence Lambert
- First appearance: Episode 1575; 16 February 1998
- Last appearance: Episode 1589; 19 March 1998
In-universe information
- Wife: Julie Haye (backstory)
- Sons: Josh Saunders

Eliot Saunders, played by Lawrence Lambert, is the father of Josh Saunders (Jon Lee) and former husband of Julie Haye (Karen Henthorn). Eliot is angry about Julie taking Josh to live in Scotland. As Eliot is Jewish, Josh is obliged to have a Bar Mitzvah to appease his father before he leaves for Scotland. Josh is initially opposed to this, as he is not remotely interested in religion. He starts missing his Bar Mitzvah tutorials, which does not please Eliot who says he and his family will not support Josh in his life if he does not go through with it. Josh ultimately decides to go ahead with the Bar Mitzvah. It takes place in March 1998. This is Eliot's last appearance.

== Hayley Edwards ==
Hayley Edwards
- EastEnders character
- Portrayed by: Karin Diamond
- Appears in: Episode 1580; 26 February 1998
In-universe information
- Brothers: Huw Edwards

Hayley Edwards, played by Karin Diamond, is the sister of Huw (Richard Elis), who tries to contact her brother in February 1998 to tell him that their father has died. She leaves messages with Huw's friend Lenny Wallace (Desune Coleman), but Huw denies knowing anyone called Hayley (he had fallen out with his family when he was caught in bed with his fiancée's sister). Hayley then arrives in Walford to persuade him to attend the funeral, but he flatly refuses until the last minute, when he takes the train home to Wales with her.

== Jonah Tyler ==
Jonah Tyler
- EastEnders character
- Portrayed by: Mark Mooney
- Duration: 1998, 2022
- First appearance: Episode 1582; 3 March 1998
- Last appearance: Episode 6569; 6 October 2022
- Introduced by: Mike Hudson (1998); Kate Oates (2022)
In-universe information
- Occupation: Gangster

Jonah Tyler, played by Mark Mooney, is a former associate of Phil (Steve McFadden) and Grant Mitchell (Ross Kemp). He later holds Phil and Courtney, Grant's daughter, hostage, threatening their mother Peggy (Barbara Windsor) and assaulting Frank Butcher (Mike Reid) when he stands up to him. He returns to Walford in April 2022 to make another deal with Phil but discovers that he is in prison. Phil sends his sister Sam (Kim Medcalf) to do the deal instead, however, their meeting is interrupted by Phil's ex-wife Sharon Watts (Letitia Dean). Sam gets the percentages wrong and it transpires that Jonah wants 12% from the Mitchells as protection money. He uses Phil's absence to threaten Sam and Phil's fiancée Kat Slater (Jessie Wallace) into funding the protection. Sam later meets Jonah with Jack Branning (Scott Maslen) and uses Jack's position as a detective inspector to blackmail Jonah into accepting her offer of a higher markup per cent on their business deal. Jonah decides to monopolise in Walford and plans to buy the nightclub "Ruby's", from Ruby Allen (Louisa Lytton), much to the opposition of Sam. She later outbuys him and renames the club "Peggy's". Despite this, Jonah remains feared by Kat and Sharon after a series of threats, though they are unaware that Sam is instead responsible. It is later revealed that Sam has been working with Jonah to get revenge on Phil, by ordering his henchmen to taunt Sharon and Kat, under the orders of Sam. He uses this to force Sam into allowing his men to peddle drugs inside Peggy's.

== Louise Raymond ==
Louise Raymond, played by Carol Harrison, is the estranged wife of Terry Raymond (Gavin Richards) and mother of Tiffany Mitchell (Martine McCutcheon) and Simon Raymond (Andrew Lynford). She is first seen during the wedding ceremony of Terry and Irene Hills (Roberta Taylor), when Louise stops proceedings to announce that she and Terry are still married. Harison has described Louise as "very strong and resilient but deep down she has a very vulnerable streak [...] there are two sides to her. She is a lot of fun but she carries a lot of pain. Louise is a woman of the world who has had very high highs and very low lows. She is also a woman who sees people's flaws and accepts them without judgment."

== Arjun Kapoor ==
Arjun Kapoor
- EastEnders character
- Portrayed by: Uncredited
- First appearance: Episode 1643; 21 July 1998
- Last appearance: Episode 1673; 24 September 1998
- Introduced by: Matthew Robinson
In-universe information
- Mother: Gita Kapoor
- Stepfather: Sanjay Kapoor
- Half-sisters: Sharmilla Kapoor
- Aunts: Meena McKenzie

Arjun Kapoor is the son of Gita Kapoor (Shobu Kapoor) who was conceived after a one night stand. He made his first appearance on 21 May 1998 when he was born. Her husband Sanjay (Deepak Verma) finds her in Birmingham and is shocked to see she has given birth. Despite his fury, he takes her home to Albert Square and finally comes to terms with Gita's illegitimate son and decides to raise him as his own with her. However Polly Becker (Victoria Gould), a local reporter writes a story about Gita's son for the Walford Gazette and the whole of the square know what happened. Sharmilla Kapoor (Priya Bilkhu), their daughter got bullied at school. Reporters began to make the Kapoors' lives miserable and therefore they decided to leave Walford in October 1998.

== Josie McFarlane ==
Josie McFarlane, played by Joan Hooley, is the mother of Mick McFarlane (Sylvester Williams). She is described as "well-groomed...confident" and someone who "set high – if not impossible – standards, and inevitably people failed her." Josie fosters a young girl named Kim (Krystle Williams), who she claims is a distant relative of Mick's. Kim is actually the illegitimate daughter of Josie's philandering husband, and after her mother's death, Josie kindly takes her in instead of seeing her go into care.

== Kim McFarlane ==
Kim McFarlane
- EastEnders character
- Portrayed by: Krystle Williams
- Duration: 1998–2002
- First appearance: Episode 1658; 25 August 1998
- Last appearance: Episode 2242; 22 January 2002
- Introduced by: Matthew Robinson
In-universe information
- Occupation: Student
- Father: John McFarlane
- Mother: Yvette
- Adoptive mother: Josie McFarlane
- Half-brothers: Mick McFarlane

Kim McFarlane, played by Krystle Williams, first arrives in Albert Square in August 1998 along with her guardian Josie McFarlane (Joan Hooley). Both have supposedly come over from Jamaica to visit Josie's son, Mick (Sylvester Williams), however it soon becomes clear that the purpose for their visit is not as innocent as Josie initially makes out. Mick is expecting his mother, but is surprised when she turns up with Kim, whom he has never met or heard of before. Josie claims that Kim is a distant relative, whom she is looking after for a while. However, it is subsequently revealed that instead of being a distant relative, Kim is actually Mick's half-sister. Kim is the product of an affair Mick's father had when he was temporarily estranged from Josie. Her mother had died when she was eight and Josie – who had lost her husband by then too – adopted Kim, rather than see her taken into care. Mick is shocked at this revelation, but he is a pretty easy going guy, so he soon accepts Kim as his new little sister, although he find Kim's tagging around after him a little irksome at first.

Kim attends Walford High School and soon becomes friendly with local girls Sonia Jackson and Nicky di Marco (Natalie Cassidy and Carly Hillman), although she is a bit younger than them, so she often gets excluded from their more mature conversations. Later on in her time in Walford, Kim attends a modelling audition with Nicky to give her moral support. However, it is Kim who is successful and not Nicky. Ambitious Josie is delighted and sets about trying to get Kim to attend as many auditions as possible. However, Kim is rejected at a casting for not being slim enough and so she starts cutting out food, developing an eating disorder that threatens to spiral dangerously out of control. It takes the combined efforts of Mick and Dr Fred Fonseca (Jimi Mistry) to get Kim back on the road to recovery.

In 2000, Josie is deported back to Jamaica for forgetting to renew her visa and Kim remains living in Walford with her brother. Kim appears infrequently after this, occasionally showing up to visit Sonia and she also gets a part-time job washing cars for Roy Evans (Tony Caunter). Kim is also very upset when Sonia decides to give up her newborn daughter, Chloe, for adoption, as Kim herself had been an adoptee. When Mick is offered a job touring with a band in 2002, he initially rejects it because of his responsibility towards Kim. However, she is adamant that he should take the job and so he leaves Walford, leaving Kim in the care of their aunt Winnie, who lives away from the square. (This was in contrast to press reports at the time, which stated Kim would move in with the Jackson family.) Kim disappears after this and her current whereabouts have never been revealed. Her last appearance is in January 2002.

== Fred Fonseca ==
Fred Fonseca, played by Jimi Mistry, is "an attractive young doctor", who becomes the local GP in 1998, after the retirement of Dr. Legg (Leonard Fenton). Fred befriends Mick McFarlane (Sylvester Williams), and comes out as a homosexual, and as a result is subjected to homophobia from several of the local residents, including teenager Martin Fowler (James Alexandrou).

== Carrie Swann ==
Carrie Swann
- EastEnders character
- Portrayed by: Holly Atkins
- Duration: 1998–1999
- First appearance: Episode 1673; 24 September 1998
- Last appearance: Episode 1763; 13 April 1999

Carrie Swann, played by Holly Atkins, is an artist and friend of Teresa di Marco (Leila Birch). She holds an exhibition in the night café in 1998, and returns in 1999 and starts dating Huw Edwards (Richard Elis). She moves to the West country, and Huw decides to leave Walford and live with her.

== Mel Owen ==
Melanie "Mel" Owen, played by Tamzin Outhwaite, who arrives in Albert Square to reunite with her brother, Alex Healy (Richard Driscoll). Author Kate Lock has described Mel as free-spirited, exuberant, a beauty, wild-at-heart, and "a restless soul with a troubled past". Mel marries Ian Beale (Adam Woodyatt) on New Year's Eve 1999, and later has a problematic marriage to Steve Owen (Martin Kemp). In 2001, she is kidnapped by her former lover, Dan Sullivan (Craig Fairbrass).

== Billy Mitchell ==
Billy Mitchell, played by Perry Fenwick, is a distant relative of Phil Mitchell (Steve McFadden). He is first seen as Jamie Mitchell (Jack Ryder)'s abusive guardian, and Jamie is eventually taken away from Billy by Phil. Billy has failed marriages with Little Mo Morgan and Honey Edwards (Kacey Ainsworth and Emma Barton), and sees the birth of his children, Janet (who has Down's syndrome) and Will Mitchell. In 2011, he makes contact with his granddaughter, Lola Pearce (Danielle Harold) for the first time.

== Lilly Mattock ==
Lilly Mattock, played by Barbara Keogh, is first seen in Albert Square in 1998 when she moves into a flat with fellow senior-citizen Dot Cotton (June Brown), after both of their respective homes have burnt down. Lilly likes to forget her age and concentrates on having fun. This is in stark contrast to Dot, and the two often tease each other with their obvious personality differences. Lilly has a rude awakening when she is mugged in 1999, and she is never quite the same again.

== Jamie Mitchell ==
Jamie Mitchell, played by Jack Ryder, is the nephew of Billy Mitchell (Perry Fenwick), who is also Jamie's legal guardian. Billy physically abuses Jamie, so he is taken in by his godfather, Phil Mitchell (Steve McFadden). "Cockney totty" Jamie has brief flings with Janine Butcher (Charlie Brooks) and Zoe Slater (Michelle Ryan), but it is Sonia Jackson (Natalie Cassidy) who proves to be Jamie's first and only true love.

== Cindy Williams ==
Cindy Williams is the daughter of Cindy Beale (Michelle Collins) and Nick Holland (Dominic Taylor). She is the half-sister of Steven, Peter and Lucy Beale. As a baby, she was played by Ella Wortley and Cydney Parker, and on 14 September 2007 she was played by child actress Eva Sayer. On 18 June 2013, it was announced that Cindy would be returning to EastEnders on 20 August, with Mimi Keene taking over the role. Keene took a break from the show following Lucy's murder, from 25 April 2014 to 28 August 2014, with a one-off appearance on 20 May 2014.

== Gina Williams ==
Gina Williams
- EastEnders character
- Portrayed by: Nicola Cowper
- Duration: 1998–1999, 2007, 2014
- First appearance: Episode 1693; 10 November 1998
- Last appearance: Episode 4844; 25 April 2014
- Introduced by: Matthew Robinson (1998); Diederick Santer (2007); Dominic Treadwell-Collins (2014)
In-universe information
- Father: Tom Williams
- Mother: Bev Williams
- Sisters: Cindy Beale
- Aunts: Pam
- Nephews: Steven Beale; Peter Beale
- Nieces: Lucy Beale; Cindy Williams; Gina Knight; Anna Knight
- Other relatives: Louie Beale; Beth Williams; Abi Branning

Gina Williams, played by Nicola Cowper, is the sister of Cindy Beale (Michelle Collins) and first appears for Cindy's funeral in 1998. She refuses to let Cindy's former husband Ian (Adam Woodyatt) have custody of Cindy's newborn daughter, Cindy Jnr, whose father is Nick Holland (Dominic Taylor). Gina and Ian later reminisce about Cindy and kiss. She then reveals that she cannot have children, and Ian decides to let her care for Cindy Jnr. Ian later visits Gina to see the eclipse in 1999, and she nearly kisses him again, but is interrupted by Mel Healy (Tamzin Outhwaite), who later proposes to Ian.

Gina is seen again in September 2007. Ian visits her as he suspects that she has been harassing him by pretending to be his deceased wife Cindy and sending malicious emails and packages. He enters her house without permission and is shocked to see that Gina has made a shrine to Cindy on her living room wall. Gina greets Ian from behind a shotgun, but she then assures him that both she and her deceased sister have put the past behind them. Ian is concerned when Gina says she regularly "converses with" her deceased sister, who had even told her to expect Ian's visit. Ian accuses Gina of stalking him and is not convinced when she denies responsibility. He advises her to seek professional help. He is later kidnapped by the real stalker: Cindy's eldest son, Steven Beale (Aaron Sidwell). Ian's wife Jane (Laurie Brett) becomes frantic, and when Gina arrives in Walford to give Ian a photo of Cindy Jnr, Jane accuses Gina of terrorising Ian and they nearly come to blows, however they are stopped by Steven's paternal grandmother Pat Evans (Pam St Clement).

Gina returns on 25 April 2014, after Ian calls her to come to Walford and collect Cindy Jnr following the murder of Gina's niece Lucy Beale (Hetti Bywater). Cindy returns in August 2014, heavily pregnant and in labour. She tells Ian that Gina was planning to adopt the baby herself, and after giving birth to a baby girl Beth, Cindy remains in the care of Ian and Peter Beale (Ben Hardy). In 2023, it is revealed that Cindy Beale faked her death in 1998 and went into witness protection, and had a separate family with George Knight (Colin Salmon) in Marbella. Her eldest daughter with George, Gina Knight (Francesca Henry), is named after Cindy's sister Gina.

== Lisa Fowler ==
Lisa Fowler, played by Lucy Benjamin, is first seen as new assistant market inspector to Michael Rose (Russell Floyd). Described as, "feisty, independent and ambitious", Lisa becomes romantically involved with Phil Mitchell (Steve McFadden). The relationship is problematic, and Lisa suffers a miscarriage, emotional and mental abuse from Phil, and infidelity when Phil has sex with her best friend, Melanie Owen (Tamzin Outhwaite). All of this leads to Lisa taking extreme measures to get back at Phil. In time, she goes on to marry her longtime friend, Mark Fowler (Todd Carty).

== Liam Butcher ==
Liam Butcher, played by Sonny Bottomley from 1998 to 1999, Jack and Tom Godolphin from 1999 to 2000, Gavin and Mitchell Vaughan in 2000, Nathaniel Gleed from 2002 to 2004, James Forde from 2008 to 2015 and Alfie Deegan in 2021, is the son of Ricky and Bianca Butcher (Sid Owen and Patsy Palmer). He is born prematurely on Christmas Day 1998, on the floor of The Queen Victoria public house. In September 1999, Liam's parents separate and Bianca takes him to Manchester. In May 2002, Bianca gives Liam to Ricky. Shortly afterwards, Ricky and Liam return to Walford, but depart again in 2004. Off-screen, Liam is returned to Bianca in 2006, but he returns to Walford with his mother and siblings in April 2008.

== Steve Owen ==
Steve Owen, played by Martin Kemp, arrives in Walford and buys the Market Cellar club, which he renovates and names E20. His ex-girlfriend Saskia Duncan (Deborah Sheridan-Taylor) arrives and tries to come between Steve and his new girlfriend Melanie Healy (Tamzin Outhwaite). This leads to Steve and Saskia fighting one night, where Steve hits Saskia over the head with an ashtray, killing her instantly. This is witnessed by Steve's assistant Matthew Rose (Joe Absolom), who helps Steve dispose of the body. However, when the police find the body, Steve frames Matthew, who is consequently found guilty of manslaughter.

== Saskia Duncan ==
Saskia Duncan
- EastEnders character
- Portrayed by: Deborah Sheridan-Taylor
- Duration: 1998–1999
- First appearance: Episode 1718; 31 December 1998
- Last appearance: Episode 1738; 15 February 1999
- Introduced by: Matthew Robinson
In-universe information
- Sisters: Claudia Fielding

Saskia Duncan, played by Deborah Sheridan-Taylor, arrives in Walford in December 1998 as the obsessive ex-girlfriend of new e20 club owner Steve Owen (Martin Kemp). Steve isn't happy to see her and he tells Saskia he doesn't want her anymore, but she continues to stalk him regardless - up to the point when Saskia resorts to break up Steve's relationship with his new girlfriend Mel Healy (Tamzin Outhwaite). She eventually succeeds in seducing him, and subsequently refuses to listen when Steve insists it was a mistake.

On e20's launch night, Saskia breaks into Steve's office and kisses him. As Mel storms out of the room, it is revealed that Saskia had been pregnant with Steve's baby - but had an abortion when he said that he didn't want it. Saskia blames him for "making her kill the baby". When Steve tries to throw her out of the office, she attacks him with a champagne bottle and attempts to strangle him with his tie. It is at that moment when local resident Matthew Rose (Joe Absolom), who works in the club as Steve's employed DJ, walks in the altercation. He promptly tries to separate Saskia from Steve, but she hysterically fights him off and goes for Steve again. Steve reaches for the nearest object, an ashtray, and gives Saskia a brutal blow to the head, killing her instantly. Steve and Matthew then bury her body in Epping Forest.

Saskia's disappearance is investigated by police, and her sister Claudia Fielding (Romla Walker) arrives and suspects that Steve is involved with her disappearance. Matthew panics that she'll find out about Saskia's death and Steve tries to calm him down. The body is later discovered and both Steve and Matthew are arrested. Steve blames Matthew, who is found guilty of manslaughter. When Matthew is released in December 1999, he gets revenge on Steve by tying him to a chair and threatening to burn him alive, but he later reveals that he'd just wanted to turn Steve into an emotional wreck. Matthew then leaves the Square.

In 2018, Saskia's murder was brought up by Ciara Maguire (Denise McCormack) when she told Steve and Mel's son Hunter Owen (Charlie Winter) about who his father really was. Hunter has spent his whole life believing his dad was a hero, but Ciara threatened Mel and said she would tell him the truth if her money wasn't given to her in full. When Mel refuses to discuss about Saskia, Hunter manages to find an old news article on the internet. Mel then explains to Hunter the circumstances that led to Saskia's death and that Steve killed her in self defence.

== Others ==
Character	Date(s)	Actor	Circumstances
Paynter	26 January; 6-9 April (4 episodes)	Raymond Brody	Ian Beale's (Adam Woodyatt) barrister who disputes Cindy Beale (Michelle Collins) having access to her three children Steven Beale, Peter Beale and Lucy Beale. He cross-examines Cindy on the stand on the first day of the custody case, and brings up her affairs with Simon Wicks (Nick Berry) and David Wicks (Michael French). The following day, Paynter cross-examines Nick Holland and asks him about his relationship with Cindy and her pregnancy. In spite of Paynter's best efforts. Cindy is granted custody.
Rabbi Silverstone	19 March	Jonathan Black	The Rabbi who conducts Josh Saunders' (Jon Lee) Bar Mitzvah. He is simply credited as 'Rabbi'.
Karen	10 July	Paula Jane Ulrich	A waitress who Lenny Wallace (Desune Coleman) flirts with. She asks Huw Edwards (Richard Elis) and Robbie Jackson (Dean Gaffney) if would like some food with their beers. She is credited as Waitress.
Charlie	10-11 July (2 episodes)	Francois Brunet	A person who sells Barry Evans (Shaun Williamson) tickets to World Cup 1998. He could only obtain two of the four tickets Barry needed for him, Robbie Jackson (Dean Gaffney), Huw Edwards (Richard Elis) and Lenny Wallace (Desune Coleman).
Dr. Coucher	13 October 1998– 24 January 2003 (6 episodes)	Philip Brook	Mark Fowler's (Todd Carty) doctor. Coucher tells Mark his CD4 cell counts have risen and has him take a further blood test. The following Summer, Mark sees Boucher again. He later treats Mark when he is brought into Walford General after he collapses due to complications with his HIV. Coucher tells Mark's family that Mark has stopped taking his combination medication. Three years later, Coucher tells Mark his current drug therapy is no longer working.
Jean	5 November-25 December	Sarah Flind	A midwife who delivers Bianca Jackson's (Patsy Palmer) newborn baby, Liam Butcher.
Paramedic	3 December	Ian Gain	A paramedic who looks after Tiffany Mitchell (Martine McCutcheon) after she falls down the stairs and suffers a blood clot on the brain.
Ronnie	25 December (2 episodes)	Gerard Bentall	A homeless man who Robbie Jackson (Dean Gaffney) gives food to. Later, Dot Cotton (June Brown) and Lilly Mattock (Barbara Keogh) try to convince him to sleep in the Vicarage. He turns up to Pauline Fowler's (Wendy Richard) home for christmas dinner with his dog, Patch. Later, in Giuseppe's restaurant, he is seen playing his violin. Although he is credited as "Homeless Man", he introduces himself as Ronnie.
Patch	25 December (2 episodes)	Uncredited	A homeless man who Robbie Jackson (Dean Gaffney) gives food to. Later, Dot Cotton (June Brown) and Lilly Mattock (Barbara Keogh) try to convince him to sleep in the Vicarage. He turns up to Pauline Fowler's (Wendy Richard) home for christmas dinner with his dog, Patch. Later, in Giuseppe's restaurant, he is seen playing his violin. Although he is credited as "Homeless Man", he introduces himself as Ronnie.
