= Bruno and Luisa di Marco =

Fictional characters from the BBC soap opera EastEnders

- EastEnders character
- Lissek as Bruno
- Portrayed by: Leon Lissek (Bruno); Stella Tanner (Luisa)
- First appearance: Episode 1568; 29 January 1998
- Last appearance: Episode 1709; 17 December 1998 (Bruno); Episode 1700; 26 November 1998 (Luisa)
- Introduced by: Jane Harris
- Tanner as Luisa
In-universe information
- Occupation: Retired
- Sons: Giuseppe di Marco; Franco di Marco
- Grandsons: Beppe di Marco; Gianni di Marco; Luca di Marco
- Granddaughters: Teresa di Marco; Nicky di Marco
- Other relatives: Joe di Marco

Bruno and Luisa di Marco are fictional characters from the BBC soap opera EastEnders, played respectively by Leon Lissek from 29 January to 17 December 1998 and Stella Tanner from 29 January to 26 November 1998. They were two of many characters to be axed by executive producer, Matthew Robinson.

== Character creation and development ==
The Italian di Marco family were introduced early in 1998 by executive producer Jane Harris. The di Marcos were a family of eight, consisting of grandparents Bruno and Luisa, their daughter-in-law Rosa, her children Beppe (Michael Greco), Gianni (Marc Bannerman), Teresa (Leila Birch) and Nicky, and Beppe's young son Joe. They were heralded as the "family that would rival the Mitchells"—who are one of the most successful and long-running families to have been featured in EastEnders.

The di Marcos "landed with an almighty thud in January [1998], turning out in force for the funeral of patriarch Giuseppe", who was Bruno's son and an old business associate of the character George Palmer. The following month, the family moved to the area in which the soap is set, Walford, to run an Italian restaurant, which they named "Giuseppe's". Luisa and her husband Bruno were portrayed as Italian patriots, "for them…being Italian was everything". The characters were traditionalists with exaggerated "foreign mannerisms", often expressing the importance of family and a love of their "homeland".

Only six months after their introduction, in June 1998, the newly appointed executive producer of EastEnders, Matthew Robinson, made the decision to axe Luisa and Bruno. They were among a large number of characters to be axed by the producer in 1998, reportedly in a bid to reverse EastEnders' plummeting ratings. Other axed characters included Sanjay, Gita and Neelam Kapoor, George Palmer, Ruth Fowler, Michael and Susan Rose and Chris Clarke. At the time it was the biggest cast cull in the soap's history, and the axings continued into 1999 with the departures of characters such as Simon Raymond, Lenny Wallace, Tony Hills and the retirement of original character, Dr. Legg. In total, 26 characters were culled over a period of 21 months, which earned Robinson a reputation for being "ruthless". In the serial, Luisa suffered a stroke, and so she and Bruno decided to travel to Italy to see their "homeland" before it was too late. Once there, they liked it so much that they decided to stay. They supposedly departed in December 1998, but Luisa's last appearance was in November—her departure was explained away by her husband. The two characters survived less than a year on-screen.

The rest of the di Marcos remained with the show until 2000, when a new executive producer, John Yorke, decided to cull the majority of the family. All except Beppe (Michael Greco) and his son Joe (Jake Kyprianou) were written out. The di Marcos were reportedly "slaughtered because of a shortage of ideas for what to do with them." However, a spokesperson at the time commented: "These changes…are just part of [John Yorke's] plans to revamp the series and give it a new look." The cuts paved the way for the arrival of the "hugely popular" Slater family. Beppe and Joe remained until 2002, when they were also axed.

== Storylines ==
Luisa and Bruno di Marco first appear at the funeral of their son, Giuseppe. They had been doting parents to Giuseppe and are devastated by his death. They live with Giuseppe's wife, Rosa (Louise Jameson), and her family. They are very proud of their Italian ancestry but they actually know very little about their homeland, as they had been raised in London and lived there most of her life.

Bruno—like his father before him—had been the owner of an Italian restaurant in London's Soho, which he later gave to Giuseppe as a wedding present. The restaurant began to struggle financially, and when Giuseppe died in 1998, the di Marcos were forced to close it down. Giuseppe's friend George Palmer (Paul Moriarty)—who had bailed the restaurant out of debt several times in the past—recruits the di Marcos to run his new Italian restaurant in Walford, which he names Giuseppe's. Bruno and Luisa's family refer to them as Nonno and Nonna, which is Italian for grandfather and grandmother.

Bruno is stricken with bronchitis due to years of heavy smoking, which means that he is unable to work or help out in the restaurant. He likes to drink, play cards and hold family meetings at his favourite table.

Luisa had always been active in the upbringing of her grandchildren. She is a traditionalist, and disapproved when her grandson's wife, Sandra (Clare Wilkie), opted to go back to work instead of staying at home to look after her son, Joe (Jake Kyprianou). When the di Marcos interference became too much, Sandra walked out, abandoning Joe. Luisa subsequently played a big part in her great-grandson's upbringing.

Luisa is often troubled by the antics of her grandchildren and when she sees her youngest granddaughter, Nicky (Carly Hillman), kissing Martin Fowler (James Alexandrou), the shock is too much and she suffers a stroke shortly before Bruno's birthday in July 1998. She recovers but remains frail and in December Bruno and Luisa decide to take a trip to Italy to discover their homeland together, before it is too late. When they get there they like it so much that they decide to stay. A few weeks later they telephone Rosa to say that they are not returning.

The following year Luisa sends over an Italian salami from Italy, which is responsible for giving several of the di Marcos a bout of food poisoning. Rosa initially blames café worker, Mick McFarlane (Sylvester Williams), for serving unsanitary food, which leads to him being sacked in May 1999.

== Reception ==
The di Marcos are now deemed as something of a failure for EastEnders. Since their departure, the family has even been mocked in an EastEnders official book, entitled EastEnders 20 Years In Albert Square. In the book, the author, Rupert Smith, writes :"Nobody really knew what to do with the di Marco family, who had been languishing in the pizza restaurant without a decent storyline between them. Finally, there was nothing else for it: the di Marcos would have to go. All of them…it was as if they'd never been".

Matthew Baylis of The Guardian has commented on their lack of success: "Thank heaven for off-screen uncles. As we saw during the hurried departure of the di Marco family from Albert Square, there's nothing like a fictitious relative when you need to get characters off the screen…The di Marcos' departure had its dodgy elements. A hitherto unheard-of uncle needs help in his restaurant, so the whole family ups sticks. Including Teresa - who'd always fought for independence from her family? Rosa, who presumably owned the house she'd transformed into something resembling an Imperial Palace, is suddenly prepared to leg it with a couple of suitcases? There was plenty that didn't ring true. But few viewers minded. There was, if anything, more sympathy for the programme-makers, trying valiantly to dispose of this singularly unpopular family while retaining an element of drama."

The di Marcos have been dismissed as "unconvincing characters", and Bruno and Luisa were ridiculed, with Baylis suggesting that their "foreign mannerisms would have gone down great in any production of Fiddler On The Roof". Baylis goes on to highlight a problem that he feels "dogged the whole family", their occupation as restaurateurs. Baylis believes this kept them "self-contained", and prevented them from establishing meaningful links with other characters. He explains: "[The di Marcos] had an ambiguity, heightened by the job they did. Soapland has no place for grey areas. Bad things happen to bad people. They also happen to good people, of course, but not for very long. To make this predictable universe work on the screen, you need characters who are relatively stable (even if they are unstable). The writers and the viewers buy into a myth that people aren't particularly complex, that the full range of their feelings and actions can be revealed in a few hours on the TV. And a quick, visible way of revealing characters is to mirror them in their occupation. Thus we have Pauline Fowler, long-suffering drudge and matriarch. What better job than folding pants all day in the launderette? Or Peggy Butcher - tough but fun-loving and gregarious. So she runs the pub. But what attributes spring to mind when we think of Italian restaurants? Fond of pasta, perhaps? Permanently overworked? The job never provided an easy route into understanding the di Marcos' characters…The most visible jobs tend to be taken by the strongest, most vivid characters. Confined to their restaurant, the di Marcos could only become involved in Walford life when other characters came over to eat a carbonara. And how often do working-class East End people do that? If any di Marco wanted a night out, a pint in the Vic, a clandestine liaison, then an excuse had to be found as to why they weren't working. Transforming Giuseppe's into a daytime sandwich bar, and sending Teresa onto the market were bold rescue attempts, but they came too late. The viewers had already decided they didn't much care…Because of their jobs, the di Marcos became a largely self-contained unit…"
