= Rosa di Marco =

Fictional character from the BBC soap opera EastEnders

- EastEnders character
- Portrayed by: Louise Jameson
- Duration: 1998–2000
- First appearance: Episode 1568; 29 January 1998
- Last appearance: Episode 1983; 3 August 2000
- Introduced by: Jane Harris
In-universe information
- Occupation: Restaurant owner
- Husband: Giuseppe di Marco (backstory)
- Sons: Beppe di Marco; Gianni di Marco
- Daughters: Teresa di Marco; Nicky di Marco
- Grandsons: Joe di Marco

Rosa di Marco is a fictional character from the BBC soap opera EastEnders, played by Louise Jameson from 29 January 1998 to 3 August 2000. She is the mother of Beppe (Michael Greco), Gianni (Marc Bannerman), Teresa (Leila Birch) and Nicky di Marco (Carly Hillman). Rosa died off-screen in 2002, to coincide with her son Beppe's departure from the square.

== Creation and development ==
=== Casting ===
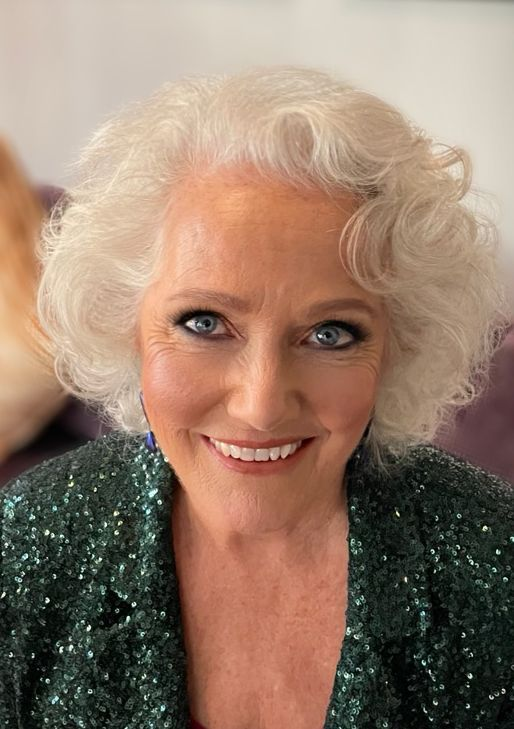
Louise Jameson (pictured) portrayed Rosa for two years.

The Italian di Marco family were introduced early in 1998 by Series Producer Jane Harris. The di Marcos were a family of eight, consisting of grandparents Bruno and Luisa di Marco (Leon Lissek and Stella Tanner), their daughter-in-law Rosa, her children Beppe, Gianni, Teresa and Nicky, and Beppe's young son Joe (Jake Kyprianou). They were heralded as the "family that would rival the Mitchells", one of the most successful and long-running families to have been featured in EastEnders.

The di Marcos "landed with an almighty thud in January [1998], turning out in force for the funeral of patriarch Giuseppe", who was Rosa's husband and an old business associate of the character George Palmer (Paul Moriarty). The following month, the family moved to the area in which the soap is set, Walford, to run an Italian restaurant, which was named Giuseppe's.

=== Departure and death ===
The di Marcos remained with the show as a unit until 2000, when the new executive producer, John Yorke, decided to cull the majority of the family. All except Beppe (Michael Greco) and his son Joe (Jake Kyprianou) were written out. They were reportedly "slaughtered because of a shortage of ideas for what to do with them". A source allegedly told The Mirror: "It is always unpleasant having to say goodbye to people who have given loyal service to the show for a number of years. But John Yorke feels it is time to make his mark on the show. Every new producer likes to do the same. John wants to introduce a new family later this year and felt the di Marcos had nowhere else to go. Their storylines were beginning to feel tired, and that is a good time to make such a drastic change...there is a lot of sympathy for actress Louise Jameson, because her character was two-dimensional from the start. Nagging, moaning mums are not viewer-friendly. There was nothing sexy or appealing about Rosa, through no fault of Louise." However, an official BBC spokesperson at the time commented: "These changes…are just part of [John Yorke's] plans to revamp the series and give it a new look." The cuts paved the way for the arrival of the "hugely popular" Slater family. Beppe and Joe remained until 2002, when they were axed too. Jameson said she was "absolutely gutted" about getting axed from EastEnders. She commented: "I'll really miss Rosa. It's like parting from a lover. I can't help thinking that she's not quite played out. A fling would have been nice with Frank, or even Roy when he was on Viagra and rampant." Years later, Jameson complained about how exit was handled, saying that she was "annoyed" by the way it was announced, adding "I was only told the night before it appeared in the papers. I thought they could have run it by me first so I could tell my family. It wasn't respectful."

== Storylines ==
Rosa first appears when George Palmer (Paul Moriarty) and Peggy Mitchell (Barbara Windsor) attend her husband's funeral in January 1998 and later moves to Walford in February 1998 along with the rest of her family. She sets up her own restaurant called Giuseppe's, named after her late husband. George had helped set this up. It was later revealed that she and George had a fling many years ago, during the time her husband Giuseppe was in prison. This leads George to believe that Rosa's son Gianni could be his son rather than Giuseppe's. This shock leads to Gianni breaking up with George's daughter Annie Palmer (Nadia Sawalha), after fearing they had been having an incestuous affair. DNA tests later confirm that Gianni is Giuseppe's son, which relieves both Rosa and Gianni. Jeff Healy (Leslie Schofield) has a crush on her, but Rosa rejects his advances. Nicky later gets food poisoning from the local café and Rosa tries to have it closed down.

Rosa later faces financial trouble with the restaurant and George offers her help, which she accepts. After Nicky claims she was assaulted by her mathematics tutor Rod Morris (Forbes Masson) and later admits she did not tell the whole truth (but was still assaulted) and then disowns the family when they said she was lying, Rosa decides the whole family should leave Walford to move to Leicester and, except for Beppe, the entire family leaves Walford in August 2000. Rosa suffers a heart attack two years later at the age of 50. Beppe then joins the rest of his family in Leicester, from where he telephones Lynne Slater (Elaine Lordan) to tell her Rosa has died and that he will not be returning to Walford.

== Reception ==
The di Marcos are now deemed as something of a failure for EastEnders. Since their departure, the family has even been mocked in an EastEnders official book, entitled EastEnders 20 Years In Albert Square. In the book, the author, Rupert Smith, writes: "Nobody really knew what to do with the di Marco family, who had been languishing in the pizza restaurant without a decent storyline between them. Finally, there was nothing else for it: the di Marcos would have to go. All of them…it was as if they had never been".

Matthew Baylis of The Guardian has commented on their lack of success: "Thank heaven for off-screen uncles. As we saw during the hurried departure of the di Marco family from Albert Square, there is nothing like a fictitious relative when you need to get characters off the screen…the di Marcos' departure had its dodgy elements. A hitherto unheard-of uncle needs help in his restaurant, so the whole family ups sticks. Including Teresa - who had always fought for independence from her family? Rosa, who presumably owned the house she had transformed into something resembling an Imperial Palace, is suddenly prepared to leg it with a couple of suitcases? There was plenty that did not ring true. But few viewers minded. There was, if anything, more sympathy for the programme-makers, trying valiantly to dispose of this singularly unpopular family while retaining an element of drama."

The di Marcos have been dismissed as "unconvincing characters". Baylis goes on to highlight a problem that he feels "dogged the whole family": their occupation as restaurateurs. Baylis believes this kept them "self-contained", and prevented them from establishing meaningful links with other characters. He explains: "[The di Marcos] had an ambiguity, heightened by the job they did. Soapland has no place for grey areas. Bad things happen to bad people. They also happen to good people, of course, but not for very long. To make this predictable universe work on the screen, you need characters who are relatively stable (even if they are unstable). The writers and the viewers buy into a myth that people are not particularly complex, that the full range of their feelings and actions can be revealed in a few hours on the television. And a quick, visible way of revealing characters is to mirror them in their occupation. Thus we have Pauline Fowler, long-suffering drudge and matriarch. What better job than folding pants all day in the launderette? Or Peggy [Mitchell] - tough but fun-loving and gregarious. So she runs the pub. But what attributes spring to mind when we think of Italian restaurants? Fond of pasta, perhaps? Permanently overworked? The job never provided an easy route into understanding the di Marcos' characters…the most visible jobs tend to be taken by the strongest, most vivid characters. Confined to their restaurant, the di Marcos could only become involved in Walford life when other characters came over to eat a carbonara. And how often do working-class East End people do that? If any di Marco wanted a night out, a pint in the Vic, a clandestine liaison, then an excuse had to be found as to why they were not working. Transforming Giuseppe's into a daytime sandwich bar, and sending Teresa onto the market were bold rescue attempts, but they came too late. The viewers had already decided they did not much care…because of their jobs, the di Marcos became a largely self-contained unit…" Tony Stewart of the Daily Mirror called Rosa "conniving".
