= Beppe di Marco =

Fictional character from the BBC soap opera EastEnders

- EastEnders character
- Portrayed by: Michael Greco
- Duration: 1998–2002
- First appearance: Episode 1568; 29 January 1998
- Last appearance: Episode 2318; 4 June 2002
- Introduced by: Jane Harris
In-universe information
- Occupation: Police officer Taxi driver Nightclub owner
- Father: Giuseppe di Marco
- Mother: Rosa di Marco
- Brothers: Gianni di Marco
- Sisters: Teresa di Marco; Nicky di Marco
- Wife: Sandra di Marco
- Sons: Joe di Marco
- Grandfathers: Bruno di Marco
- Grandmothers: Luisa di Marco
- First cousins: Luca di Marco

Beppe di Marco is a fictional character from the BBC soap opera EastEnders, played by Michael Greco. He made his first appearance on 29 January 1998, but was axed by executive producer John Yorke in 2002, with his final scene airing on 4 June 2002.

The character, alongside his family, first arrived in Albert Square as a police officer who is depicted to be his family's pride and joy. His story arc commenced with Beppe becoming sworn enemies with the square's local hardman Grant Mitchell (Ross Kemp) - up to the point where he develops romantic feelings towards Grant's estranged wife Tiffany (Martine McCutcheon); clashes with his older brother Phil (Steve McFadden); and forms a relationship with their younger sister Sam (Danniella Westbrook). Eventually, their feud culminates with Beppe being fired from the police force for attempting to frame Grant for Tiffany's murder - before he later witnesses Grant leaving the country upon learning that the latter faked his death from his criminal job with Phil.

Soon afterwards, Beppe proceeded to establish a business partnership with Phil and Grant's enemy Steve Owen (Martin Kemp) - which subsequently contributes to the character's other storylines that involves seeking to rebuild his fatherhood; a custody battle with old lover Sandra (Clare Wilkie) over the well-being of their son Joe (Jake Kyprianou); exhibiting a minor STD condition; and its contribution to his romance with a local resident, Lynne Slater (Elaine Lordan), that sparks the character becoming love rivals with her would-be husband Garry Hobbs (Ricky Groves). Beppe ends up leaving the square for his mother's funeral.

== Character creation and development ==
The Italian di Marco family were introduced early in 1998 by Series Producer Jane Harris. The di Marcos were a family of eight, consisting of grandparents Bruno and Luisa (Leon Lissek and Stella Tanner), their daughter-in-law Rosa, her children Beppe, Gianni, Teresa and Nicky, and Beppe's young son Joe. They were heralded as the "family that would rival the Mitchells", one of the most successful and long-running families to have been featured in EastEnders.

According to author Rupert Smith, the di Marcos "landed with an almighty thud in January [1998], turning out in force for the funeral of patriarch Giuseppe", who was Rosa's husband and an old business associate of the character George Palmer. The following month, the family moved to the area in which the soap is set, Walford, to run an Italian restaurant, which was named Giuseppe's.

The di Marcos remained with the show as a unit until 2000, when the new executive producer, John Yorke, decided to cull the majority of the family. All except Beppe and his son Joe were written out. They were reportedly "slaughtered because of a shortage of ideas for what to do with them". A source allegedly told The Mirror: "It's always unpleasant having to say goodbye to people who have given loyal service to the show for a number of years. But John Yorke feels it's time to make his mark on the show. Every new producer likes to do the same. John wants to introduce a new family later this year and felt the Di Marcos had nowhere else to go. Their storylines were beginning to feel tired and that's a good time to make such a drastic change." However, an official BBC spokesperson at the time commented: "These changes […] are just part of [John Yorke's] plans to revamp the series and give it a new look." The cuts paved the way for the arrival of the popular Slater family. Beppe and Joe remained until 2002, when they were axed too.

== Storylines ==
Beppe first appears in Albert Square for the funeral of his late father, Giuseppe, in January 1998. There, he is acquainted with two other attendees; Peggy Mitchell (Barbara Windsor), the landlady of the square's public house called The Queen Victoria, and her business rival George Palmer (Paul Moriarty). One month after his father's funeral, Beppe moves into the square with the rest of his family - which consists of his one brother Gianni (Marc Bannerman); two sisters Teresa (Leila Birch) and Nicky (Carly Hillman); and their mother Rosa (Louise Jameson). While his family have moved into Walford to open an Italian restaurant, Beppe has already built himself a successful career in the police force, progressing through the ranks to the Vice squad.

Upon his arrival, Beppe instantly clashes with Peggy's two sons Phil (Steve McFadden) and Grant (Ross Kemp) - also known as the "Mitchell Brothers". This had first emerged when Beppe learned that Phil and Grant have constantly dabbled on the wrong side of the law, thus seeing them as trouble makers. While his quarrel with Phil appears less occasional, Beppe frequently clashes with Grant as their animosity escalates. This becomes evident through Beppe's disapproval of Grant's mistreatment towards his wife Tiffany (Martine McCutcheon), whom he grows romantic towards and even tries urging her to leave Grant. At one point, Beppe confronts Grant in The Queen Vic over his cruelty towards Tiffany and the pair brawl. When Tiffany learns that Grant has slept with her mother Louise (Carol Harrison), she plans to leave Grant and take their daughter Courtney with him. Just as Tiffany prepares to leave after packing her bags, however, ends up falling down the stairs - making everyone suspect that Grant pushed her. When Beppe discovers this, he becomes furious and proceeds to arrest Grant for attempted murder. It is then that Beppe grows determined to get Grant out of the square when he coerces Tiffany to pretend that Grant had pushed her in order to keep him locked up, but her conscience gets the better of her and she later writes a letter exonerating Grant of any wrongdoing. She also instructs her best friend, Bianca Jackson (Patsy Palmer), to give it to the police after she leaves. Not long afterwards, however, Tiffany is killed in a car accident - unintentionally caused by Grant's stepfather Frank Butcher (Mike Reid) - whilst trying to reclaim Courtney from Grant, who has been released on bail from that point.

As Tiffany was about to elope with Beppe, he never forgives Grant and burns the letter that exonerates him. However, his police superiors soon discover what Beppe had done and he is consequently sacked from the force for withholding evidence and misconduct. When Grant finds out about the letter, he confronts Beppe in The Queen Vic and punches him when Beppe taunts Grant about the fact that he is responsible for Tiffany's ordeal and subsequent death. Their feud escalates when Beppe begins dating Phil and Grant's younger sister Sam (Danniella Westbrook), who later seeks his help when she learns from her cousin Billy (Perry Fenwick) that her brothers are planning to do a criminal job. Beppe responds by summoning the police to intercept Phil and Grant, before he joins Sam in pursuing them towards the River Thames - where her brothers have ended up plunging their getaway car into the water. When arriving at the scene of that moment, Beppe and Sam are stunned to find that only Phil is present and alive - whereas Grant is nowhere to be found. Grant is presumed dead, but Beppe discovers that he is actually alive and tracks him down at the airport. There, he sports Grant leaving the country with Courtney and calls out his name - which prompts Grant to turn and face Beppe. As they stare at each other, Grant silently bids Beppe farewell by giving him a sarcastic wave as the departure doors close - while Beppe smiles back at him in response; which implies that the pair have seemingly mended their differences despite the longstanding conflict between them. Beppe soon continues to build his relationship with Sam, until she grows jealous of his roommate Nina Harris (Troy Titus-Adams) - whose friendship with Beppe eventually sparks the end of his relationship with Sam.

Now out of work ever since getting fired from the police, Beppe starts to look for jobs - and initially gets one working as a cab driver on behalf of local businessman Barry Evans (Shaun Williamson). He soon develops a close friendship with Phil's nemesis and Grant's antagonistic business partner Steve Owen (Martin Kemp), up to the point where the latter hires Beppe to work at his nightclub: the E20. Sometime later, Beppe establishes a business partnership with Steve and ends up managing the E20 on his behalf. His newfound job continues to build when drugs are found in the club at one stage, and Beppe's police contacts come in handy after he manages to persuade them to turn a blind eye.

It soon transpires that Beppe has a son: Joe (Jake Kyprianou). His child's mother, Sandra (Clare Wilkie), left them when Joe was 10 months old - driven away by Beppe's interfering family, who never forgave her for not being Italian. His past is reemerged when Sandra appears in Walford, looking for Beppe and wanting to see their son. Although she is met with hostility at first, she and Beppe soon become closer and eventually rekindle their romance - much to his family's disgust. Because of his ties, he decides to stay in Walford when the family move away. Beppe is still in love with Sandra and soon wants to discuss having more children, Sandra flatly refuses. Soon after, Beppe's old vice-squad partner, Jack Robbins (Chook Sibtain), arrives, looking for Sandra. It turns out that Sandra had been involved with Jack for years. She left him following a miscarriage that left her unable to have children. Sandra tries to deny her feelings for Jack, but eventually, she admits that she is still in love with him and only reconciled with Beppe so she can get custody of her son. She and Jack reignite their romance and Sandra makes plans to leave with Jack and Joe. However, Beppe catches them just as they are about to leave and when he realizes what is going on, he attacks Jack, takes Joe back and denies Sandra access. Sandra and Jack subsequently threaten to fight Beppe for custody of Joe. Beppe retaliates by using his police contacts to plant drugs on Jack, getting him sacked from the force. The constant rowing is having a negative effect on Joe and he struggles to choose between his parents. This culminates in him getting hit by a car when he disobeys his father and runs across the road to be with his mother. Joe is not seriously hurt but the accident makes his parents rethink their behaviour. Beppe allows Sandra access and she leaves the following year.

By then, Beppe has become the sole owner of the E20 - after Steve allows him to buy his share of the club prior to being killed on his first wedding anniversary at the start of March 2002. This surprises Steve's wife Mel (Tamzin Outhwaite), as she thought she was the sole owner. During this time, Beppe develops a minor STD condition when he ends up spending his routine having sex with anonymous women and dumping them upon getting bored. This soon contributes to his romantic bond with Joe's babysitter Lynne Slater (Elaine Lordan), who later helps Beppe see the error of his ways. Beppe quickly falls in love with Lynne and even attempts to stop her from marrying her fiancé Garry Hobbs (Ricky Groves), and fights with Garry at the registry office; however, while Lynne is tempted to be with Beppe, she ends up choosing Garry and goes ahead with the marriage.

In June 2002, Beppe gets news that his mother has suffered a heart attack. He decides to leave the square and, after tying up some loose ends, sells the club to Phil's former lover and Grant's ex-wife Sharon Watts (Letitia Dean). Afterwards, Beppe departs from Walford to be with his family in Leicester, from where he telephones Lynne to tell her Rosa has died and that he won't be returning to Walford.

== Other appearances ==
The character of Beppe di Marco has been spoofed in the cartoon sketch show 2DTV, as well as impersonated by Alistair McGowan on his show, The Big Impression. In spite of his non-existence in real life, he was reported by a British newspaper as being in the womanising circuit with comedian Russell Brand on the last series of Big Brother's Big Mouth in 2006.

In August 2015, it was announced that Greco would reprise the role of Beppe in an eight-part television mockumentary called British Andy.

== Reception ==
In 2020, Sara Wallis and Ian Hyland from The Daily Mirror placed Beppe 96th on their ranked list of the best EastEnders characters of all time, writing that he "was nicknamed the Hoarse Whisperer on account of his softly rasping voice", but also wrote that the "ladies loved him".

The di Marcos are now deemed as something of a failure for EastEnders. Since their departure, the family has even been mocked in an EastEnders official book, entitled EastEnders 20 Years In Albert Square. In the book, the author, Rupert Smith, writes: "Nobody really knew what to do with the di Marco family, who had been languishing in the pizza restaurant without a decent storyline between them. Finally, there was nothing else for it: the di Marcos would have to go. All of them…it was as if they'd never been".

Matthew Baylis of The Guardian has commented on their lack of success: "Thank heaven for off-screen uncles. As we saw during the hurried departure of the di Marco family from Albert Square, there's nothing like a fictitious relative when you need to get characters off the screen…The di Marcos' departure had its dodgy elements. A hitherto unheard-of uncle needs help in his restaurant, so the whole family ups sticks. Including Teresa - who'd always fought for independence from her family? Rosa, who presumably owned the house she'd transformed into something resembling an Imperial Palace, is suddenly prepared to leg it with a couple of suitcases? There was plenty that didn't ring true. But few viewers minded. There was, if anything, more sympathy for the programme-makers, trying valiantly to dispose of this singularly unpopular family while retaining an element of drama."

The di Marcos have been dismissed as "unconvincing characters". Baylis goes on to highlight a problem that he feels "dogged the whole family", their occupation as restaurateurs. Baylis believes this kept them "self-contained", and prevented them from establishing meaningful links with other characters. He explains: "[The di Marcos] had an ambiguity, heightened by the job they did. Soapland has no place for grey areas. Bad things happen to bad people. They also happen to good people, of course, but not for very long. To make this predictable universe work on the screen, you need characters who are relatively stable (even if they are unstable). The writers and the viewers buy into a myth that people aren't particularly complex, that the full range of their feelings and actions can be revealed in a few hours on the TV. And a quick, visible way of revealing characters is to mirror them in their occupation. Thus we have Pauline Fowler, long-suffering drudge and matriarch. What better job than folding pants all day in the launderette? Or Peggy [Mitchell] - tough but fun-loving and gregarious. So she runs the pub. But what attributes spring to mind when we think of Italian restaurants? Fond of pasta, perhaps? Permanently overworked? The job never provided an easy route into understanding the di Marcos' characters…The most visible jobs tend to be taken by the strongest, most vivid characters. Confined to their restaurant, the di Marcos could only become involved in Walford life when other characters came over to eat a carbonara. And how often do working-class East End people do that? If any di Marco wanted a night out, a pint in the Vic, a clandestine liaison, then an excuse had to be found as to why they weren't working. Transforming Giuseppe's into a daytime sandwich bar, and sending Teresa onto the market were bold rescue attempts, but they came too late. The viewers had already decided they didn't much care…Because of their jobs, the di Marcos became a largely self-contained unit…"
