= Huw Edwards (EastEnders) =

Fictional character in the BBC soap opera EastEnders

- EastEnders character
- Portrayed by: Richard Elis
- Duration: 1996–1999
- First appearance: Episode 1295; 28 May 1996
- Last appearance: Episode 1764; 15 April 1999
In-universe information
- Occupation: Barman
- Sisters: Hayley Edwards

Huw Edwards is a fictional character from the BBC soap opera EastEnders, played by Richard Elis. Huw was introduced on 28 May 1996 and remained on-screen until 15 April 1999.

== Creation and development ==
Actor Richard Elis was cast in the minor role of Huw for a period of three episodes in 1996; however, producers enjoyed the character and his contract was extended. Elis was an inexperienced actor and was sent to audition for the role while still in drama school at the Welsh College of Music and Drama. He was given two minutes on stage to impress London casting agents. His rendition of an extract impressed the EastEnders casting director, Jonathan McLeash, and he was asked to attend an audition in London. At the audition, Elis did a comedy monologue about a man working in a chip shop in Cardiff. Approximately four hours later, Elis was telephoned and told he'd been cast as Huw. Elis has described the experience as "mindblowing".

Huw was the serial's first Welsh character, which pleased Elis as he was able to play the character with his native West Walian accent. Although the producers decided to make Huw Welsh, according to Elis they had not specifically been looking to hire a Welsh actor prior to his audition. Huw has been described as likable and a loveable lout.

Discussing his first time on set, Elis said in 2010, "I don't think I really realised the enormity of it at the time as it all happened so quickly, I didn't have time to panic or worry about what I was letting myself in for. At the end of the day, I had literally just graduated from college and had no idea that I was going to be playing the role for any longer than three episodes so I suppose I didn't really have time to be nervous. One day I was a student about to leave college in Cardiff and then I'm on the set of EastEnders with Barbara Windsor [who plays Peggy Mitchell] showing me round [...] My first lines on the show were spoken to Tiffany Mitchell, played by Martine McCutcheon. I was working in the nightclub and she came in and said, 'What cocktails do you do?' and I said, 'I'm Huw, I will make anything you want' and threw a cocktail together. I thought I was only going to be in three episodes so wanted to make the most of every single line I got to say [...] Then within a few weeks I'm making bacon sandwiches and cups of tea in Ian Beale's cafe and mixing cocktails in the bar. It was bonkers."

Huw was introduced simultaneously with his friend and fellow squatter Lenny Wallace (Des Coleman). A recurring storyline in the serial concerned Huw and Lenny purposefully trying to antagonise Ian Beale (Adam Woodyatt). Elis described the role as fun, and commented some of his most liked storylines in 2010: "Huw would constantly wind up Ian and so, consequently, it was a really fun role. Ian would get very irritated by it and Adam Woodyatt is a great actor so was able to really portray the fact that Huw was winding him up. [...] It was great fun, more fun because I got to play a Welshman but for me, as an actor just out of college, the whole experience was amazing. [...] And being the only Welsh accent on a London soap made me stand out more I suppose. I think being so obviously Welsh on the show made Huw stand out as a character." According to Elis, producers required Huw to be overweight and Elis has claimed that he was asked not to lose weight while playing the role.

It was reported in December 1998 that executive producer Matthew Robinson had axed Huw because the character was "going nowhere". However, Elis claimed in 2010 that he decided to leave the role in 1999 after three years playing Huw as he feared being typecast. Elis has commented, "My agent at the time told me that if you are in a soap for three years, it takes three years for the viewers to forget you, whereas if you are in one for five years, it takes another 10 years before they forget you. I just felt it was time to go. It was great to be on it but it was just a job to me."

== Storylines ==
Huw is from Pontarddulais, who is best friends with Lenny Wallace (Des Coleman). They live in a squat in Albert Square, enjoying loud music and winding up Ian Beale (Adam Woodyatt). Lenny and Huw also operate a pirate radio station from the premises for a while. Ian tries to get them evicted several times — once calling the council to complain about noise pollution — and Lenny and Huw do everything they can to annoy him further.

During his time in Walford, Huw works in George Palmer (Paul Moriarty)'s nightclub as a barman, soon bought by Steve Owen (Martin Kemp), and in the café as a waiter. In 1998 Huw develops a crush on Ruth Fowler (Caroline Paterson). Ruth sees him only as a platonic friend and unwittingly lets him get his hopes up for a relationship for a period of time. Huw eventually leaves the Square to live with Carrie Swann (Holly Atkins), an artist who is exhibiting her abstract art in the café.

== Reception ==
Huw has been described by Jane Simon of The People as a "token Welshman". Stuart Heritage from The Guardian recalled the character in 2011, suggesting that Huw's "only role was to say the name 'Ian Beale' in increasingly malevolent ways."
