= Dan Sullivan (EastEnders) =

Fictional character from the BBC soap opera EastEnders

- EastEnders character
- Portrayed by: Craig Fairbrass
- Duration: 1999–2001
- First appearance: Episode 1788; 7 June 1999
- Last appearance: Episode 2150; 16 August 2001
- Introduced by: Matthew Robinson
In-universe information
- Occupation: Con artist; Barman; Businessman; Pub landlord; Gangster

Dan Sullivan is a fictional character from the BBC soap opera EastEnders, played by Craig Fairbrass. He was first introduced to the series as a regular character from 7 June 1999 to 10 July 2000 before returning as one of the show's major antagonists from 26 February to 16 August 2001.

Introduced by series producer Matthew Robinson, the character Dan was an alpha male hardman who originally came into Albert Square as the new boyfriend of local resident Carol Jackson (Lindsey Coulson). Their relationship escalated when the two got engaged and she became pregnant with his child, but it soon transpired that Dan had a previous fling with Carol's eldest daughter, Bianca Jackson (Patsy Palmer), and the pair ended up having an affair despite the latter's established marriage with her beloved husband, Ricky Butcher (Sid Owen). Eventually, the truth about Dan's affair with Bianca came to light when both Carol and Ricky find out about their betrayal; in turn, Carol broke up with Dan and had an abortion, and Bianca refused to elope with him after Ricky ended his marriage with her. Subsequently, all the characters excluding Dan were written out of the show.

Afterwards, Dan embarked on an intense feud with his arch-nemesis, Phil Mitchell (Steve McFadden). The events of their competitive rivalry initially started out as a close friendship and business partnership when Dan became co-owner of The Queen Victoria public house after Phil sold his family's share of the pub to him, which in turn led to Dan clashing with both Phil's mother, Peggy (Barbara Windsor), and also Ricky's father, Frank (Mike Reid), on multiple occasions. At the same time, Dan established a major conflict with Phil's fellow archenemy Steve Owen (Martin Kemp), which had been developing in the case of both Steve and Phil having romantic connections to Dan's former girlfriend Mel Healy (Tamzin Outhwaite) after his brief romance with young neighbour Teresa di Marco (Leila Birch) didn't last long.

In 2001, the character became involved in a high-profile storyline dubbed "Who Shot Phil?" when he sought revenge on Phil and began extorting money from the latter's adolescent godson Jamie (Jack Ryder) as well as bullying Phil's estranged cousin Billy (Perry Fenwick) into compliance. The whodunit scenario reached a turning point when Phil's ex-girlfriend Lisa Shaw (Lucy Benjamin) was revealed to be the shooter, but instead he frames Dan as the assailant; Dan was consequently arrested and wrongfully charged for the crime, but ended up being found not guilty despite Steve collaborating with Phil to have their common enemy jailed. Dan's story arc concluded when he kidnapped Mel to blackmail both Steve and Phil into giving him a £200,000 ransom, after which he ultimately left the country.

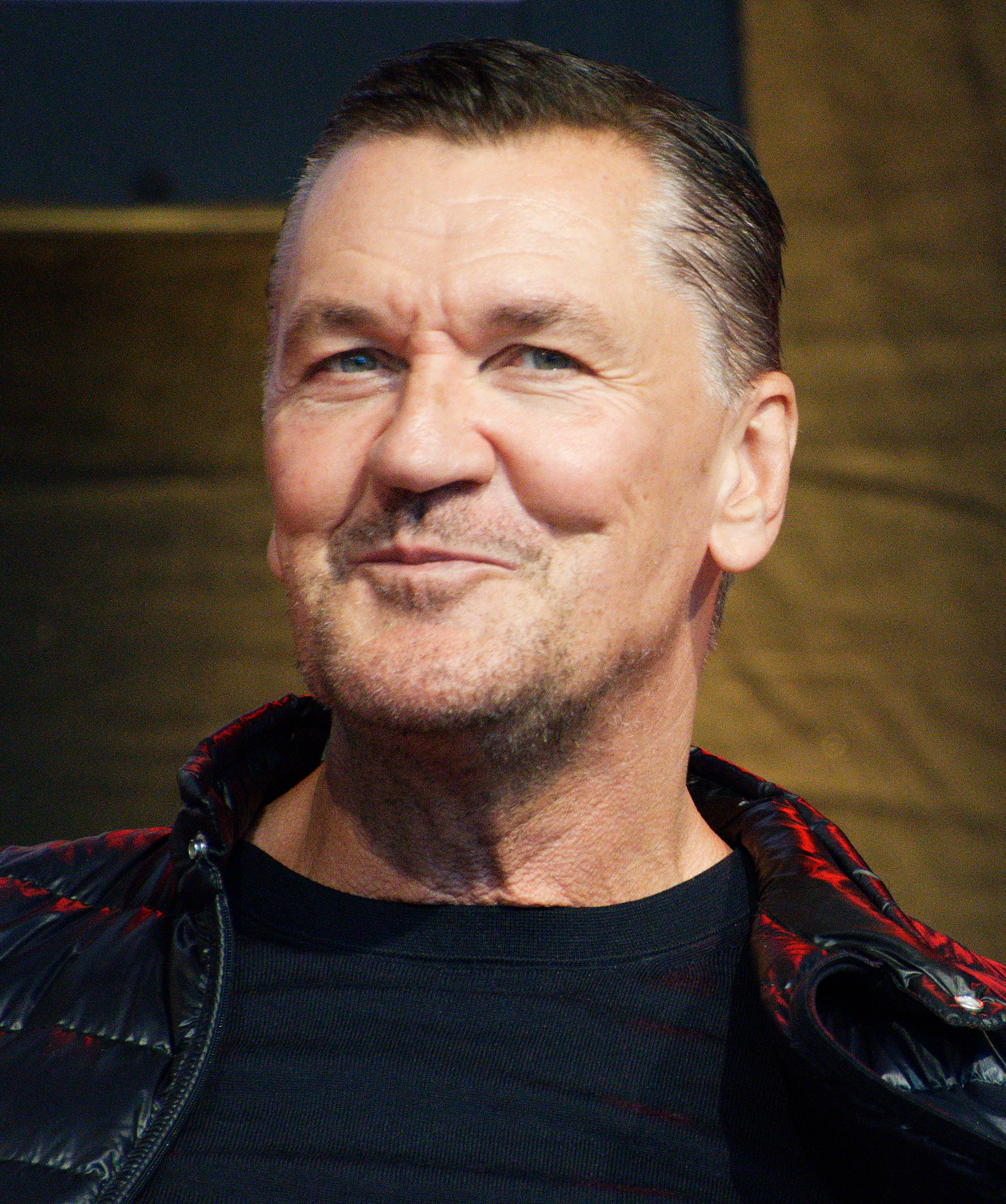
Craig Fairbrass (pictured) was introduced as Carol Jackson's love interest, Dan.

== Development ==
Dan was introduced as a new love interest for the returning Carol Jackson (Lindsey Coulson), following her separation from her husband, Alan Jackson (Howard Antony).

In 2001, it was reported by The Mirror, that Phil Mitchell (Steve McFadden) would be shot in a whodunnit style storyline. The possible suspects were Lisa Shaw (Lucy Benjamin), Melanie Healy (Tamzin Outhwaite), Steve Owen (Martin Kemp), Mark Fowler (Todd Carty), Ian Beale (Adam Woodyatt) and Dan. Some bookmakers refused to take bets as they were convinced that Dan would commit the crime. The bookies' favourite for Phil's shooter was Dan, with the odds 3–1.

== Storylines ==
Dan arrives in Walford on 7 June 1999, appearing as the latest boyfriend of local café manager Carol Jackson. They soon move to Walford's local community, Albert Square, where the couple plan to get married after Dan learns that Carol is expecting his child. Their wedding plans surprise Carol's daughter Bianca (Patsy Palmer), as she and Dan had a fling when she was a teenager on holiday many years before. After the pair find themselves secretly reacquainted with each other, Dan and Bianca start an affair – even though she is married to local resident Ricky Butcher (Sid Owen), who ends up befriending Dan. Eventually, Carol discovers the affair and publicly exposes it in front of Ricky and their neighbours. She then disowns Bianca, breaks up with Dan by chucking him out of her house, and later aborts their child before leaving Walford. Bianca subsequently departs the square after she and Dan are unable to resume their relationship. Shortly afterwards, Dan and Ricky begin to clash after Ricky blames Dan for ruining his life and marriage with Bianca. The hostility between them escalates when Dan begins to flirt with Ricky's sister Janine (Charlie Brooks), which promptly sparks a conflict between the siblings' father Frank (Mike Reid) and Dan himself. One such incident between them involves Frank punching Dan for making remarks on how he brought up his children. This eventually becomes too much for Ricky, who ends up leaving the square in April 2000.

It is at this point where Dan has become closely acquainted with Phil Mitchell – the square's local hardman who is also partly related to the Butcher family as he is Ricky's former brother-in-law and Frank's eldest stepson. Dan quickly establishes himself as Phil's best-friend as the two continue to bond over their relationship problems and business interests, with Phil even confiding to Dan about how Ricky previously married his sister Sam (Danniella Westbrook) before his marriage with Bianca emerged years afterwards. Towards the Millennium celebrations, Dan finds Phil spending his Christmas alone at The Queen Victoria public house and comforts him over his wife Kathy Beale (Gillian Taylforth) and their son Ben leaving the county without him months ago. They soon proceed to form a business partnership when Phil sells his ownership of The Queen Vic to Dan for £5; with Phil having done so to spite his mother Peggy (Barbara Windsor) in retribution for supposedly favoring his brother Grant (Ross Kemp), who recently left the square following a botched criminal job between the brothers, more than him. Phil slowly regrets this decision after his girlfriend Lisa Shaw confronts him for upsetting Peggy. However, Dan refuses to relinquish his ownership of the pub back to Peggy and later discovers that Phil is running a car lot scam with both Frank and their colleague Roy Evans (Tony Caunter). When Lisa is rushed to hospital one night, Dan offers Phil a lift to the hospital and the two begin arguing over his ownership of the pub – which Dan once again refuses to relinquish back to Peggy for £10,000. Phil lashes out in response to this, but Dan overpowers Phil and threatens to report him to the police. Phil backs down and leaves Dan outside the hospital, where inside he finds out that Lisa has suffered a miscarriage and that their unborn baby has died. The next day, Dan learns that Phil plans to kick him out of the house and responds by reporting his motor scam to the police; Phil later changes his mind after he makes amends with Dan, and the two plan on further establishing their partnership whilst Dan hopes to cover up his betrayal from Phil.

By then, Dan has romantically bonded with Phil's barmaid and Lisa's best friend: Mel Healy. Their growing relationship is initially contracted when Dan befriends and later dates one of the pub's regular customers, Teresa di Marco (Leila Birch), which causes her overprotective brother Gianni (Marc Bannerman) to become suspicious over his intentions. When Gianni witnesses Dan further wooing Teresa and her friends, he confronts them and warns Dan to stay away from his sister. They nearly brawl after Gianni chucks a drink at Dan for dismissing him, but Mel separates them and Teresa later ends her crush on Dan at her family's urging. Dan then continues to develop his relationship with Mel, who soon learns about him reporting Phil and his motor scam to the police. Mel subsequently confides this secrecy to Lisa, who ends up telling Phil about Dan tipping off the police about his motor scam. This causes Phil to end his friendship with Dan, and he later plots to win back his share of the pub as payback. Phil arranges a card game between him and Dan, who ends up losing after the former tricks him into refunding his £5. Outraged, Dan swears revenge on Phil. He soon learns that Mel told Phil about his tip-off and, suspecting that she conspired with Phil against him, begins stalking her – up to the point where he even threatens Mel with phone calls. This continues until Dan, while corning Mel just as she finishes one of her with her night shifts at the pub, finds himself confronted by her boyfriend. Steve Owen – who threatens to kill Dan unless he leaves the square. At first, Dan ignores Steve and plans to further harass Mel, but is forced to change his mind when Steve visits him with a gun – thus making his threat clear; Dan seemingly complies to his demands and leaves the square on 7 July 2000.

Dan returns to the square on 26 February 2001 – still determined to get revenge on Phil. He plans to confirm this to Steve and, after learning that he and Mel are set to get married at the start of March 2001, sets out to visit him at his nightclub; the E20. There, he finds Phil's cousin Billy (Perry Fenwick) working as Steve's secretary and orders him to summon Steve himself. Billy initially refuses and attempts to threaten Dan by brandishing Steve's gun out of his safe, but Dan is unfazed and – after taunting Billy over how he would really feel about killing a man – easily disarms Billy, forcing him to drop his gun and discuss like "big boys". Moments later, Steve arrives and orders Billy to get out of his office. Dan then proceeds to sarcastically offer Steve his congratulations, and the two begin exchanging threats to each other when Steve reminds Dan of the last warning he gave him about leaving the square for good. Although Dan tells Steve that he is back in the square to deal with Phil and not Mel, he is dismissed at the expense of warning Steve to not be fooled by Mel as she previously did to her ex-husband Ian Beale. Their conversation ends with Dan offering Steve a handshake, to which Steve threateningly rejects by telling Dan to get out of his office – which prompts Dan to tell Steve that he'll regret crossing him. On the day Steve and Mel get married, Dan approaches Billy at Steve's wedding reception and demands that he bring Phil for him when the latter arrives. Billy complies and tells Phil that Dan is waiting for him in Steve's office, much to Steve's frustration. Upon confronting each other, Dan tells Phil that he plans to settle his score with him and begins to taunt him just as Phil gives Dan five seconds to get out of his sight. When Phil ends up chucking wine from his glass into Dan's face, Dan threatens Phil by promising him that he'll regret it. Later on that night, Phil is shot by an unknown assailant – though not before Dan resorts to harassing him with phone calls. Following Phil's shooting, Dan becomes a prime suspect. He soon begins to target Phil's godson Jamie (Jack Ryder), threatening to inflict violence on the youngster unless he agrees to repay him the money Phil owes him. Jamie makes his effort to avoid succumbing to Dan's threats, even when Phil learns about Dan's comeback. Dan also continues to torment Mel once more, and begins clashing with Steve over their similar issues with Phil.

It is soon revealed that Lisa is the culprit who shot Phil. After confronting Lisa over the shooting, Phil forgives her and decides to frame Dan – knowing that Dan is a much bigger threat to him than Lisa. He first contacts Dan's former crime boss, Ritchie Stringer (Gareth Hunt), and together the pair hatch a plan where Dan would be given the same gun that Lisa used to shoot Phil. Once the weapon is in his position, Dan later confronts Phil at the garage to extort money from him – threatening to shoot him otherwise. When Jamie ends up walking to see Phil being held at gunpoint, he attempts to disarm Dan – who fights off Jamie and ends up shooting the garage's clock from the resulting impact. Moments later, the police arrive thanks to Phil's tip-off and Dan is consequently arrested; he is later charged with attempted murder and will be put on trial for the crime in July 2001.

Before the trial commences, Phil convinces Steve to work together in getting Dan imprisoned – under the guise that the pair, though archenemies, would be well-rid of their common nemesis and Mel's tormenting ex-boyfriend once and for all. Phil also summons his lawyer Marcus Christie (Stephen Churchett) to help Jamie prepare in testifying against Dan, while also forcing Ian to help contribute to his testimony as well. Despite all their efforts, however, Dan is found not guilty by the jury in August 2001. Deducing that Phil had framed him for the shooting and that Steve had been conspiring with their shared enemy against him, Dan resolves to get revenge on his two alpha male rivals once and for all – up to the point where he wrongfully asserts that Steve is the one who shot Phil. He first blackmails Billy into giving him leverage against Phil and Steve. When he learns from Billy that Mel had a one-night stand with Phil on Christmas Night 2000 before marrying Steve months later, Dan realises that Mel is the key to his plan and sets out to target her as a result of this. Dan soon kidnaps Mel and holds her captive in an abandoned tower block building, whereupon he alerts Phil and Steve of the situation. When he calls them again, Dan demands that Phil and Steve give him £100,000 each in exchange for Mel's safety. It soon becomes clear that Dan's plan to get revenge on Phil and Steve was to kidnap Mel, the common link between the three rivals, and then blackmail the pair into giving him £200,000 ransom in order to rescue Mel from captivity. This forces Phil and Steve to work together in getting £200,000 for Mel's safety. As they do so, Dan attempts to justify his actions to Mel by telling her what Phil and Steve have been up to; Mel gradually realises that Dan is telling the truth about being framed for Phil's shooting when he reveals that the pair have been secretly colluding in their ownership of the Queen Vic with Phil's ex-lover Sharon Watts (Letitia Dean). It is then Dan informs Mel that Steve has been having an affair with a blonde woman named Karen (Kate Fleetwood) to elude himself from grieving over the death of his estranged mother Barbara (Sheila Hancock), which Dan had learned from Billy when blackmailing the latter into giving him leverage against Phil and Steve. These revelations soon help Mel improve the situation despite Dan promising Phil and Steve that he will kill her unless the ransom is completed.

Phil and Steve are eventually successful in getting the £200,000 ransom money, but later get into an argument when Phil secretly acquires a handgun and plans to kill Dan to protect Jamie and Peggy from him. Steve argues that he just wants to get Mel back safely and insists on doing the exchange on his own, only for Dan to then call Phil and demand that he – not Steve – make the exchange on his own. Phil complies with Dan's demand and sets off to make the exchange on his own. When he arrives, Dan puts Mel in a hiding place and then cautiously gets Phil prepared for the meet-up. He first demands Phil to leave his jacket in his car, then to open the duffel bag containing the £200,000 ransom money, and lastly insists that Phil prove he is unarmed. This forces Phil to reveal the gun he hid in his jacket, and Dan forces him to leave the gun in the car before making his way up the building. As Phil obliges, Dan gets out his own handgun and sets off to confront Phil at the elevator. He then awaits for Phil's arrival, but is caught off-guard when Phil suddenly disarms Dan and holds him at gunpoint. After forcing Dan back into the room where Mel is being held captive, Phil is unable to find her and demands to know where she is kept hidden. Dan then begins to taunt Phil over his one-night stand with Mel, which provokes him in kicking Dan to the ground. Phil then prepares to kill Dan, telling him that he will become the first person who he will have intentionally murdered in light of having never really done so before. In that moment, however, Mel intervenes by cutting off the lights. This distracts Phil, and Dan uses the opportunity to disarm him before knocking Phil unconscious. Upon realizing that Mel saved his life, Dan thanks her for saving his life and gives Mel £50,000 in gratitude. When Phil starts to regain consciousness, Dan handcuffs him to a radiator and plans to kill him. Mel, however, appeals to his better nature and urges him to be better than Phil. In response, Dan asks Mel to wait outside for him while he deals with Phil on his own. Once Phil has woken up, Dan threatens to shoot him unless he begs for mercy. Phil refuses and dares Dan to kill him. Eventually, Dan pulls the trigger – causing Phil to flinch. However, the gun is not loaded; Dan reveals that he unloaded the gun to take Mel's advice in proving that he is better than Phil, who he saw was terrified of dying at the moment he flinched when Dan pulled the trigger. After stating they are now even, Dan gets his final revenge on Phil by gagging him and leaving him handcuffed at the radiator – bidding his archenemy a morbid and taunting farewell. Phil later frees himself and leaves the area, but by then Dan is already long gone after dropping Mel off at a rendezvous point near Walford. Earlier on when they parted ways, Dan apologises to Mel for putting her through the situation with his revenge plan and wishes her the best of luck. Dan then leaves the country with his £150,000 ransom money – considerably richer than when he first arrived in Walford.

Though he is not seen again on the square again, Dan leaves flowers on Steve's grave following the latter's death in March 2002 – at the epic climax of his feud with Phil – bearing the message "Gotcha!". In 2003, Billy is led to believe that Dan is back in the square to settle a few scores after hearing rumours of his supposed comeback – although this is off-screen. This is later revealed to be a hoax by the police to connect Phil to the alleged murder of Lisa. It soon transpires that Dan is last heard to be living in Spain, but having many brushes with the law – just like he did in the square.

== Reception ==
In 2020, Sara Wallis and Ian Hyland from The Daily Mirror placed Dan 43rd on their ranked list of the best EastEnders characters of all time, calling him a "East End bad boy" and calling his "love triangle" with Bianca and Carol "memorable".

== See also ==
- List of soap opera villains
