= Race Davies =

British actress

- Born: 10 August 1962 (age 63); Moglabazar, Sylhet, East Pakistan
- Occupation: Actress

Race Davies (born 10 August 1962) is a British actress. She played Jackie Owen in EastEnders from 1999 to 2000.

== Filmography ==
=== Film ===
Year	Title	Role	Notes
1992	Wild West	Receptionist	
2015	Waffle Street	Translator	

=== Television ===
Year	Title	Role	Notes
1988–1989, 2008	The Bill	Nurse, Janette Harper	3 episodes
1991	Lazarus and Dingwall	Beverly Armitage	6 episodes
1992	Sean's Show	Rachel	Episode: "Badgers"
1993	Side by Side	Brenda Cox	Episode: "Episode #2.6"
1993	Desmond's	Erica	Episode: "Fairytales"
1994	The 10 Percenters	Rachel Borgnine	Episode: "Feud"
1994	Roughnecks	Margaret	Episode: "Episode #1.4"
1997	Insiders	Emma Davies	4 episodes
1997	Men Behaving Badly	Sally-Anne	2 episodes
1998	My Wonderful Life	Lydia	3 episodes
1999	Kavanagh QC	Teresa Stinton	Episode: "End Game"
1999–2000	EastEnders	Jackie Owen	81 episodes
2004	Holby City	Cherise Patterson	Episode: "The Eleventh Commandment"
2006	Doctors	Yvonne Prentiss	Episode: "All Dressed Up"
2007	HolbyBlue	Melanie Silbert	Episode: "Episode #1.4"
2009	Hollyoaks	Christine Carpenter	3 episodes

=== Video games ===
Year	Title	Role	Notes
2007	Heavenly Sword	Whiptail	
2013	DmC: Devil May Cry	Succubus	
