= Des Coleman =

British actor, singer and weather presenter

- Born: Desune Fitzgerald Coleman; 14 March 1965 (age 61); Derby, Derbyshire, England
- Education: Guildford School of Acting
- Occupations: Weather presenter Singer actor
- Years active: 1980–present
- Employer(s): Notts TV; ITV News Central Weather
- Known for: ITV News Central; BBC Radio Derby; East Midlands Today (2007–11)
- Notable work: Lenny Wallace in EastEnders
- Television: EastEnders (1996–1999); The Bill (2003); ITV News Central Weather; ITV Weather; The One Show (current)
- Website: www.itv.com

Desune "Des" Fitzgerald Coleman (born 14 March 1965) is an English actor, singer and weather presenter. He has appeared in numerous stage musicals, and played the role of Lenny Wallace in BBC1's EastEnders. He is currently a weather presenter for Good Morning Britain and ITV News Central.

== Career ==
Coleman worked as a welder after leaving school aged 16, before deciding to pursue a career in performing. He attended the Guildford School of Acting in Surrey, and after graduating in 1993 he worked as a singer in Germany for six months in the stage musical Chicago. He then landed a starring role in the musical Miss Saigon.

In 1996, he was cast as wide boy Lenny Wallace in the BBC soap opera EastEnders. His first television job, Coleman remained with the soap until 1999. His television work post EastEnders has included: Is Harry on the Boat? (2001); Casualty (2003); The Bill (2004), and Doctors (2004; 2006). He also appeared in the 2001 film Submerged with Sam Neill. On stage he has appeared in London's West End's Rent, Simply Heavenly, and understudied the lead in Trevor Nunn's musical opera Porgy and Bess. Currently, Des works on The One Show as a reporter.

Coleman has worked for BBC Radio Derby, where he was asked to do the weather report at the Broadcast Centre in Nottingham. This led to a career change. He trained as a weather presenter and in 2007 he began presenting for BBC's East Midlands Today television. The BBC terminated his contract in 2011 after Coleman used a live weather report to protest his innocence over firearm charges; he deliberately put the wrong temperature on the weather map and told viewers they should not believe everything said by the media.

He has reported for Inside Out and Politics Show for BBC East Midlands. In March 2016 he presented for BBC Radio Nottingham.

In 2016, he joined ITV Central's ITV News Central as the weather presenter.

On 8 September 2020 and August 2021, Coleman made his debut as a guest weather presenter for ITV Breakfast’s Good Morning Britain.

He also stars as singer Sammy Davis Jr. alongside Frank Sinatra and Dean Martin impersonators in a stage performance called The Rat Pack.

== Personal life ==
In 2010, Coleman was arrested and charged for allegedly pointing an imitation firearm at another driver on a motorway. Coleman denied the charges. In April 2011, Coleman was completely exonerated of the allegations. According to the judge at the court hearing, the prosecution acted negligently, having not discovered details of past convictions of the prosecution's witness. The witness had four incidents of road rage since 2009, and in one instance, threatened another motorist with a knife. The judge suggested the case should not have come to trial and ordered that a transcript of the proceedings be sent to the Director of Public Prosecutions.

In November 2018, Coleman was rushed to hospital after a collapse due to haemorrhage in the bowels. He underwent surgery to remove tumours in his bowel and spent two days on life-support. He made a recovery three months later in February 2019.

On 9 April 2020 it was announced Coleman was self-isolating in the light of the COVID-19 pandemic.
