= Steve Owen (EastEnders) =

Character in EastEnders

- EastEnders character
- Portrayed by: Martin Kemp
- Duration: 1998–2002
- First appearance: Episode 1716; 28 December 1998
- Last appearance: Episode 2264; 1 March 2002
- Introduced by: Matthew Robinson
- Book appearances: Steve Owen: Still Waters (2001)
- Spin-off appearances: Pudding Lane (1999)
In-universe information
- Occupation: Career criminal Nightclub owner Businessman
- Father: Richard Owen
- Mother: Barbara Owen
- Sisters: Jackie Owen
- Wife: Mel Healy (2001–2002)
- Sons: Hunter Owen

Steve Owen is a fictional character from the BBC soap opera EastEnders, played by Martin Kemp. He first appeared on 28 December 1998. Introduced by series producer Matthew Robinson, Steve was a shady businessman who originally came into Albert Square to buy the local Market Cellar club – which he then renovated and later renamed the E20. He soon became one of the show's primary villains when the character's first major storyline saw Steve kill his old flame Saskia Duncan (Deborah Sheridan-Taylor) during the opening night of his E20 nightclub on Valentine's Day 1999, after which he frames his DJ employee Matthew Rose (Joe Absolom) for the crime, which leads to Matthew enacting revenge on Steve.

Steve embarks on feuds with Phil Mitchell (Steve McFadden) and Dan Sullivan (Craig Fairbrass) and he develops a relationship with Mel Healy (Tamzin Outhwaite). Steve contributes to his significant interaction with other members of the Mitchell family by establishing an antagonistic business partnership with Phil's brother Grant (Ross Kemp); sleeping with their younger sister Sam (Kim Medcalf); employing the siblings' cousin, Billy (Perry Fenwick); clashing with Phil's adolescent godson Jamie Mitchell (Jack Ryder); and sparking a quarrel with the family's matriarch, Peggy Mitchell (Barbara Windsor), over his managing stake of The Queen Victoria.

In 2001, the character was involved in the "Who Shot Phil?" storyline when he became a prime suspect. The whodunit scenario began with Steve marrying Mel on the day of Phil's shooting and ultimately concluded with Dan kidnapping Mel for ransom against both Steve and Phil, after the pair had worked together to implicate Dan behind the shooting – even though the culprit was earlier revealed to be Phil's ex-girlfriend and Mel's closest companion: Lisa Shaw (Lucy Benjamin). Martin Kemp soon quit the series after his contract to the show had expired, and his final scenes were aired on 1 March 2002, when Steve was killed-off in a vehicle explosion. Kemp received multiple award nominations and victories for his critically-acclaimed portrayal of Steve Owen.

== Development ==
=== Relationship with Mel Healy ===
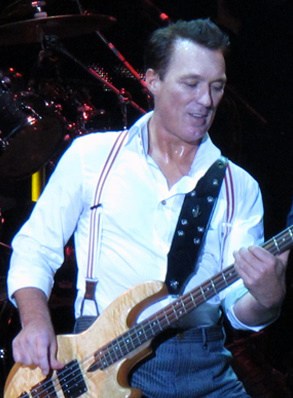
Martin Kemp (pictured) portrayed Steve.

In an interview in June 2000, Kemp discussed the relationship between Steve and Mel: "Steve's convinced Mel will make his life complete. She kept him going during all the bad times and now he's determined to have her. It's true of a lot of guys who get into trouble, they hang their hat on one idea and that keeps them sane [...] there's a driving force that kept them going while they were [in prison]. And often that's a woman. You know from those tender moments when Mel came to visit Steve [in prison] that she was the thing that kept him going, and he won't stop til he gets her back." Eventually the couple were shown to marry in the soap in March 2001, despite a revelation that Mel had strayed with Steve's nemesis Phil Mitchell (Steve McFadden). Tamzin Outhwaite explained, "With Ian, Mel was the one who didn't want to go through with it. This time around Mel is the one who is apprehensive, hoping Steve will be there for her. If he isn't, she has no reason to stay in Walford. This really is make or break time for her." The wedding night was a precursor to one of the soap's most publicised storylines, Who Shot Phil?, where Phil was gunned down by an unknown assailant and, due to Mel's infidelity, Steve became one of the prime suspects for the murder attempt, though he transpired to be a red herring. Discussing Mel and Steve's wedding, Outhwaite said, "Even though this wedding with Steve has got as much controversy as Mel's last one [with Ian], it feels more true. The characters seem more suited and it's not a big, white wedding, it's a low-key register office thing." 17 million viewers watched the wedding.

In August 2001, EastEnders began airing a 4th weekly episode. The storyline to mark the occasion centered around Mel, her husband Steve, his archenemy Phil, and their common nemesis Dan Sullivan (Craig Fairbrass). After Phil and Steve wrongfully framed Dan for Phil's shooting, Dan sought revenge by kidnapping Mel and demanding a ransom. An EastEnders insider reportedly told the Daily Mirror, "This has [been] one of the most dramatic storylines we have ever filmed. Dan has vowed to get even with Phil and Steve for framing him over the shooting. Kidnapping Mel kills two birds with one stone. Although Mel and Phil have had their differences, he still harbors feelings for her." As part of the storyline, Outhwaite, as Mel, was tied up to a radiator in a council flat. Outhwaite commented, "They offered to untie my wrists between scenes, but I said no so I could feel what it was really like. My wrists were raw by the end of it and I was exhausted, but that was the challenge I wanted."

=== Departure ===
On 26 July 2001, it was announced that Kemp had decided to leave EastEnders and that he was to move from the BBC to rival station ITV. He said of his decision: "I have had a wonderful time at EastEnders and I will be very sad to leave, but I feel that its time to move on." It was reported that EastEnders producers decided to kill off his character as "revenge" for how the situation was handled. In 2006, Kemp ruled out a return to the show, saying he stayed for too long. However, in 2009, he expressed a wish to return, saying, "Working on EastEnders was the best job I ever had. I want the producers to ring me up and get me back on the show. Steve was blown up, but I could come back as his evil twin!" He also said he was happy that he had a dramatic exit.

== Storylines ==
Steve arrives in Walford — a fictionalized borough in East London— and buys the Market Cellar club in the borough's local community: Albert Square. Shortly afterwards, he renovates the club and renames it to E20. While making preparations for his new club's opening event, Steve romantically bonds with Mel Healy (Tamzin Outhwaite) — who recently moved into the square. Their relationship becomes threatened, however, when Steve receives numerous unexpected visits from his former girlfriend: Saskia Duncan (Deborah Sheridan-Taylor). After trying to come between him and Mel respectively, Saskia sleeps with Steve and makes sure everyone knows about it. On the opening day of the E20, Saskia arrives and taunts Steve. She knocks him around until she tries to strangle him with his tie. In self-defence, Steve picks up a heavy marble ashtray and hits her over the head with it, killing her instantly. With the help of his DJ employee Matthew Rose (Joe Absolom), who witnessed the events, Steve buries her in Epping Forest. Saskia's corpse is discovered months later and a shaken, nervous Matthew confesses to the police. A trial is held Steve is found not guilty but, Matthew is found wrongfully guilty of manslaughter and wrongfully sentenced to seven years in prison.

After framing Matthew for Saskia's murder, Steve settles his freedom and begins to clash with the "Mitchell Brothers" — which consist of the square's local hardman Phil Mitchell (Steve McFadden) and his younger brother Grant (Ross Kemp). This ultimately leads to Steve becoming archenemies with Phil, though not after he and Grant embark on an antagonistic business partnership that ends with the latter punching Steve on his way to do a criminal job with Phil; which results in Grant fleeing the country to start anew in Rio — Brazil. In November 1999, Steve joins Phil and Grant's sister Sam (Danniella Westbrook) on a trip to Brighton with her friends; Janine Butcher (Charlie Brooks), her brother Ricky (Sid Owen), and their friend Mark Fowler (Todd Carty). When Mel joins them in the trip, Steve reconciles with her — even though she has now become engaged to Phil's stepson Ian Beale (Adam Woodyatt); however, Mel soon recoups her relationship with Steve after dumping Ian for discovering his lies.

In February 2000, Matthew's conviction is quashed on appeal, and he returns to take revenge on Steve; they fight and Matthew knocks Steve out, before tying him to a chair in the E20 and then chucking petrol over him, threatening to incinerate him. Steve is reduced to a desperate, helpless wreck, at which point Matthew reveals the "petrol" is actually just water, and that he just wanted to show Steve up for what he really is. Steve becomes depressed and addicted to drugs as a result, but leaves the Square - returning a few weeks later having conquered his addiction. He manages to get his life back on track by proposing to Mel, to which she accepts, and soon befriends Grant's love rival Beppe di Marco (Michael Greco).

Steve, who by this point is going through a drugs problem, visits his mother Barbara after discovering that she has terminal heart disease. Barbara is obsessed with the British royal family, though not so caring about her own children. Eight months later, Barbara attends Steve's wedding to Mel Healy (Tamzin Outhwaite), taking a shine to his nemesis Phil Mitchell (Steve McFadden), to the point of putting his photograph on her fireplace mantel.

Steve marries Mel, despite finding out the day before that she had slept with Phil on Christmas Day. Later on that night, Phil is shot by an unseen assailant and Steve becomes the prime suspect upon returning from his holiday. The police gather evidence of Steve's implication, as he had known about Mel's one-night stand with Phil prior to his shooting and that the gun he normally keeps in the E20 office is missing. However, when Phil recovers, Steve is proven to be innocent when Phil ends up confronting the real culprit; his former girlfriend and Mel's best-friend, Lisa Shaw (Lucy Benjamin). After gradually forgiving Lisa for the shooting, Phil initially plans to frame Steve for the crime — but then decides to incriminate their fellow enemy, Dan Sullivan (Craig Fairbrass), instead. Phil entraps Dan in attempting to rob him so that the police can arrest Dan for the shooting. This works successfully and Phil later convinces Steve to help him ensure that Dan would be sent down for the shooting; Steve testifies against Dan on Phil's behalf, but Dan ends up being found not guilty.

Later in 2001, Steve visits Barbara when she is in a critical condition and confronts her about the abuse she'd showered on him when he was a child. She tries to defend her actions by saying her husband, Richard left her to bring up two children with no money. She refuses to let Steve call an ambulance and asks him to kiss her. He gives her a peck on the forehead but she asks for a kiss on the lips. When he leans forward, she grabs him and gives him an extremely passionate kiss, telling him he is an attractive man. Steve is disgusted and leaves. Barbara dies soon after. Mel is the only person in attendance at Barbara's funeral, while Steve is having sex with another woman.

Following his release, Dan kidnaps Mel and holds her ransom to get revenge on both Phil and Steve — having discovered their conspiracy and assuming from the impact that Steve was the one who shot Phil in the first place. Afterwards, Dan informs Steve of the situation with Mel and threatens her life both he and Phil deliver £100,000 each to him from the E20. This forces Steve and Phil to work together in order to save Mel. After managing to obtain the £200,000 that Dan demanded from them both, Steve intends to make the exchange for Mel — up to the point where he argues with Phil over whether Dan needs to be taken down in order to stop him from making their lives harder. Just as Steve prepares to deliver the money, however, Dan calls Phil and orders him — not Steve — to make the exchange for Mel. In response, Phil complies and goes to make the exchange on his own. There, he momentarily disarms Dan and nearly shoots him dead — but Dan ends up overpowering Phil when Mel distracts him. Dan then flees Walford with the ransom money, but not after he brings Mel back to Walford and she returns to Steve in the square. While he is relieved that she is unharmed, Mel confronts Steve over all the things Dan told her during her kidnapping ordeal; she was led believe that Steve shot Phil when Dan quizzes her on this theory — before he then revealed that, during his phone call with Phil to exchange Mel for the money, Phil told him that Steve had secretly bought The Queen Victoria public house in partnership with Phil's ex-lover Sharon Watts (Letitia Dean). After arguing with Phil about Dan's theories, Mel comes to learn of her husband's criminal activities and get revenge on Steve by burning down his club out of anger: she then chucks her wedding ring at Steve before leaving Walford to clear her mind over Steve's activities.

Steve's demise in 2002

Soon afterwards, Steve finds himself with financial problems; his insurance policy is invalidated due to the fact that he neglected to mention both his involvement in Saskia's death and an incident from his past, the latter of which he attempted to cut costs by illegally importing duty-free wines from France. To sort out his financial difficulties, he organises a robbery to help finance the renovation of the club and arranges for Phil's cousin Billy (Perry Fenwick) and some old friends to partake in the job. Steve plans to steal money from a wealthy businessman named Alan. During the heist, Steve attempts to trap Alan's mistress Jan Sherwood (Cherie Lunghi) and they end up having a one-night stand together; Steve and Jan split the money that was stolen, fooling Steve's gang into believing Jan had taken it all. Mel returns and Steve woos her.

By then, Steve's rivalry with Phil has escalated. He first tries to infuriate Phil by pretending he slept with Sharon while they were recouped their old relationship. Phil responds by attacking Steve and ends up getting arrested, up to the point where he is charged for assault. He later sleeps with Sam (now played by Kim Medcalf) in a bid to further antagonize Phil, who then arranges for Steve to be confronted by the people who he owes money to. On the day Steve and Mel were supposed to be celebrating their first wedding anniversary, he plans for them to start anew in United States together. The couple invite Lisa and her boyfriend Mark to join them, with Steve also convincing Lisa to take her and Phil's daughter Louise (Rachel Cox) as well. Trouble emerges when Mark is unable to go, and Lisa believes the plan is falling apart. Steve ends up in his car with Louise, and Phil chases after them in his own car. Steve's tire bursts causing him to crash into a motorbike and a wall, causing a fire. Steve passes Louise to Phil and manages to rescue her through the car window but Phil is unable to rescue Steve. The car explodes in a fireball, killing Steve as Phil watches on. Following his death, Mel leaves the square and gives birth off-screen to their son, Hunter Owen (Charlie Winter). Before her departure, she gave Phil an urn containing Steve's ashes and, although he initially intends to flush them down the toilet, his conscience gets the better of him and decides instead to scatter them on his mother's grave, before saying "Rest in peace".

== Reception ==
Kemp's portrayal of Steve saw him nominated for several awards, many of which he won. He won in the "Most Popular Actor" category at the 2000 National Television Awards and was nominated again the next year. He won "Best Actor" at the Inside Soap Awards in 2001 and "Best Soap Actor" at the TV Quick Awards three years running, from 2000 to 2002. At The British Soap Awards, he was nominated for "Best Actor" and the character for "Villain of the Year" in 1999, winning the latter in 2000. He went on to win "Best Actor" at the 2001 and 2002 ceremonies. Additionally, Steve's car crash was nominated for "Spectacular Scene of the Year" and "Best Exit" in 2002.

In 2020, Sara Wallis and Ian Hyland from The Daily Mirror placed Steve 57th on their ranked list of the best EastEnders characters of all time, calling his exit "spectacular".

== See also ==
- List of soap opera villains
