= Clare Wilkie =

British actress (born 1974)

- Born: 1974 (age 50–51)
- Occupation: Actress
- Years active: 1987–present
- Website: www.clarewilkie.com

Clare Wilkie (born 1974) is a British actress, best known for playing Sandra di Marco in the television soap opera EastEnders.

Prior to her appearance in EastEnders, she had acted in the ill-fated soap opera Eldorado (the second actress to play Danish teenager Trine Svendsen), and played a leading role in the period drama series Berkeley Square. She then starred in Carlton Television's third incarnation of Crossroads between January and May 2003.

Wilkie has also worked in theatre in London, receiving good reviews for her performances in In Your Hands, and Absurd Person Singular. In 2007, she appeared in two plays at the Nuffield Theatre in Southampton (The Cage by Deboarah Gearing, and The Grizzled Skipper by Maggie Nevill), and at the Theatre Royal, Windsor, in My Cousin Rachel.
