= Leon Lissek =

British actor (1939–2022)

- Lissek as Bruno di Marco in EastEnders
- Born: 19 January 1939; Australia
- Died: 13 January 2022 (aged 82); Slough, Berkshire, England
- Occupation: Actor
- Years active: 1959–2010
- Television: EastEnders (1998)
- Spouse: Heather Canning (m. 1969; died 1996)

Leon Lissek (19 January 1939 – 13 January 2022) was an Australian-born British actor.

He appeared in over 80 films in his career, which started with Marat/Sade, his film roles include Time Bandits, The Unbearable Lightness of Being, Nicholas and Alexandra, and The Horsemen.

Lissek was also well known for his small screen roles in the TV drama series The Sullivans and EastEnders.

== Biography ==
Lissek was born in Australia on 19 January 1939. He started acting at the Kadimah Jewish Cultural Centre and National Library in Melbourne, through his school-days and during his university year (he gave up the law course at Melbourne University about half-way through), when he was part of the Marlowe Society in late 1950s. He went to live in England in 1963.

Lissek played Hans Kauffman on The Sullivans. He also performed on stage. A review of Company, which played in Exeter in 1980, said Lissek was "admirably cast". Lissek, who was Jewish, spoke in defence of performing The Merchant of Venice, which is regarded by some as antisemitic.

== Personal life ==
His wife, Heather Canning, was an actress. They married in 1969; she died in 1996. Lissek's death was announced by the entertainment union Equity in June 2022; he had died in Slough, Berkshire, in January aged 82.

== Selected TV and filmography ==
- Marat/Sade (1967) as Lavoisier
- The Avengers (1968) as Taxi Driver in episode "The Forget Me Knot"
- Journey to the Unknown (1968) as Matakitas
- Tell Me Lies (1968) as Guest
- Special Branch (1970) as Hoffman
- The Last Valley (1970) as Czeraki
- Countess Dracula (1971) as Sergeant of Bailiffs
- The Horsemen (1971) as Chikana Proprietor
- Nicholas and Alexandra (1971) as Avdeyev
- The Sullivans (1976) as Hans Kaufman
- Sweeney 2 (1978) as Cardona Alexandros
- The Famous Five (1978) as Hunchy
- The Professionals (1978), one episode – Where The Jungle Ends as Pole
- Shogun (1980) as Father Sebastio
- Time Bandits (1981) as 1st Refugee
- The Island of Adventure (1982) as Jo
- Ever Decreasing Circles (1984) Christmas special – The Party as Mr.X
- Eleni (1985) as Antoni
- Personal Services (1987) as Mr. Popozogolou
- Noble House (1988) as Christian Toxe
- Whoops Apocalypse (1988) as Politburo Member
- The Unbearable Lightness of Being (1988) as Bald Man in Bar
- Bloodmoon (1990) as Myles Sheffield
- The Trial (1993) as Stairman
- Nostradamus (1994) as Inquisitor
- EastEnders (1998) as Bruno di Marco
- Arabian Nights (2000) as Dr. Ezra
- Suzie Gold (2004) as Julius
- Clouds Over the Hill (2011) as Jacob Schiff
