= Jane Harris (producer) =

British television director and producer

Jane Harris is a British television director and producer, best known for her contributions to soap operas, including EastEnders and Family Affairs.

== Career ==
Harris worked on the BBC play Cathy Come Home in 1966. The play was produced by Tony Garnett, who Harris has described as her mentor. She later moved to America, where she worked on the soap opera General Hospital, and the successful action series The A-Team. When she returned to the United Kingdom, she worked for the BBC soap opera EastEnders.

In 1988, she was the serial's programme editor, but rose to producer in 1995, and eventually took control of the show as the series/executive producer in 1996, following the departure of Corinne Hollingworth. At EastEnders, Harris was responsible for introducing the di Marco family, the Flahertys, Irene Hills, Lorna Cartwright, as well as bringing back Frank Butcher and Dot Cotton as full-time characters. Axings included characters such as Ted Hills, Frankie Pierre and Felix Kawalski.

Storylines that aired under her tenure included Phil Mitchell’s alcoholism, Ricky Butcher and Bianca Jackson’s wedding, the critically panned Ireland episodes, and Cindy Beale’s attempted assassination of Ian Beale, which brought in an audience of twenty three million in 1996, roughly four million more than rival Coronation Street. Harris's contributions to the soap were awarded in 1997, when EastEnders won the BAFTA for "Best Drama Series."

She shared the award with producer, Corrinne Hollingworth. She left the series at the end of 1997, and was succeeded by Matthew Robinson. Following this, Harris moved to channel five to become the series producer of its flagship soap opera Family Affairs, taking over from co-creator and her former boss on EastEnders, Corinne Hollingworth. She has also worked as an assistant director on various programmes including the police dramas Mersey Beat (2001) and Beech is Back (2001).

Media offices
Preceded by Corinne Hollingworth	Executive Producer of EastEnders; 8 July 1996 – 9 February 1998	Succeeded by Mike Hudson
