= Stella Tanner =

British actress (1925–2012)

- Tanner as Luisa di Marco in EastEnders
- Born: 1 January 1925; London, England
- Died: 26 March 2012 (aged 87); London, England
- Occupation: Actress
- Television: EastEnders (1998)
- Spouse: David Bauer (m. 1960; died 1973)
- Children: 1

Stella Tanner (1 January 1925 – 26 March 2012) was an English radio and television actress.

== Career ==
Tanner was born in 1925 and studied at the Royal Academy of Dramatic Art (RADA). She left her focus on dramatic acting to form the Tanner Sisters with her sister, Frances Tanner, (1923-2016), who was also an actress. Together, they made hundreds of appearances on British radio and television during the 1950s, including alongside Buddy Holly in March 1958. The Tanner Sisters often performed with the Hedley Ward Trio, first appearing with them on the Educating Archie radio show from 1950 to 1952.

Tanner pursued a career in television comedy after she and Frances ended the Tanner Sisters act after ten years. Tanner made her television acting debut in 1960 on Sykes and A..., opposite Eric Sykes. She was cast in guest roles in numerous sitcoms, including an episode of The Rag Trade in 1963, Fawlty Towers in 1979, and It Ain't Half Hot Mum in 1981. From 1971 to 1972 she portrayed Adam Faith's girlfriend's mother in the ITV series, Budgie. Tanner was also cast as Luisa di Marco in EastEnders throughout 1998, as well as a role in Coronation Street.

== Personal life ==
Stella Tanner died on 26 March 2012 at the age of 87. She was survived by her daughter, Alexa. Tanner's husband, American actor David Bauer, died in 1973.

== Filmography ==
- Sykes and A... (1960–1962)
- BBC Sunday-Night Play (1961)
- Crying Down the Lane (1962)
- Armchair Theatre (1961–1971)
- Signpost (1962)
- The Rag Trade (1963)
- First Night (1963–1964)
- Festival (1964)
- Murder Most Foul (1964)
- The Four Seasons of Rosie Carr (1964)
- Task Force Police (1964–1972)
- Dixon of Dock Green (1964–1974)
- Liza of Lambeth (1965)
- Theatre 625 (1966)
- Mrs Thursday (1967)
- Hugh and I (1967)
- This Man Craig (1967)
- No Hiding Place (1967)
- Beggar My Neighbour (1967)
- The Gamblers (1967)
- The Revenue Men (1967)
- Nicholas Nickelby (1968)
- Mystery and Imagination (1968)
- Otley (1968)
- Thingumybob (1968)
- The Jazz Age (1968)
- The Ugliest Girl in Town (1968)
- ITV Playhouse (1968–1981)
- Take Three Girls (1969–1970)
- The Expert (1969–1971)
- W. Somerset Maugham (1970)
- Confession (1970)
- The Mating Machine (1970)
- Jane Eyre (1970)
- Never Mind the Quality, Feel the Width (1970)
- Fun and Games (1971)
- The Trouble with Lilian (1971)
- Budgie (1971–1972)
- Coronation Street (1971–1972)
- Bless This House (1972)
- Sex and the Other Woman (1972)
- Cosmo and Thingy (1972)
- Crown Court (1972)
- Love Story (1973)
- Milligan in... (1973)
- The Gordon Peters Show (1973)
- Hadleigh (1973)
- Beryl's Lot (1973)
- Sykes (1973)
- Helen: A Woman of Today (1973)
- Marked Personal (1974)
- The Case of Eliza Armstrong (1974)
- No, Honestly (1974)
- The Changes (1975)
- Overlord (1975)
- Whodunnit? (1975)
- Shades of Greene (1975)
- My Son Reuben (1975)
- Q5 (1975–1979)
- Mr Smith (1976)
- Spring & Autumn (1976)
- Angels (1976)
- The Mike Reid Show (1976)
- Maiden’s Trip (1976)
- The Dick Emery Show (1977)
- The Upchat Line (1977)
- Citizen Smith (1977)
- Play for Today (1977)
- The Losers (1978)
- Fawlty Towers (1979)
- Grundy (1980)
- In Loving Memory (1980)
- Robin's Nest (1981)
- Maybury (1981)
- Goodbye Darling (1981)
- It Ain't Half Hot Mum (1981)
- Take Three Women (1982)
- Nanny (1983)
- Brookside (1984)
- The Gentle Touch (1984)
- West (1984)
- Full House (1985)
- Bleak House (1985)
- The Bright Side (1985)
- Never the Twain (1986–1988)
- Slinger's Day (1987)
- Les Girls (1988)
- The Bill (1988–1993)
- Act of Will (1989)
- The Witches (1990)
- Never Come Back (1990)
- Freddie and Max (1990)
- Paul Merton: The Series (1990)
- Casualty (1994)
- Harry Enfield and Chums (1994)
- Rumble (1995)
- Paul Merton in Galton and Simpson's... (1996)
- Jack and Jeremy's Real Lives (1996)
- April Fool’s Day (1997)
- Seesaw (1998)
- EastEnders (1998)
- Lucy Sullivan Is Getting Married (1999–2000)
- Fogbound (2002)
