= Carly Hillman =

British actress (born 1983)

- Born: 11 June 1983 (age 42); Greater London, England
- Occupations: Television & Film Actress, Voiceover, Solo Vocalist and Performing Arts Teacher
- Years active: 1998–present
- Spouse: Ben Probert
- Website: http://www.carlyhillman.co.uk http://www.actonestageschool.co.uk

Carly Hillman (born 11 June 1983) is a British actress from Hornchurch in Greater London best known for playing Nicky di Marco in the BBC soap opera EastEnders from 1998 to 2000.

Carly's character (Nicky) was best friends with Sonia Jackson (Natalie Cassidy) and Martin Fowler (James Alexandriou) in the soap. Her most notorious storyline involved her falling in love with her tutor Rod Morris, which then led to Nicky being sexually assaulted by him.

Other family members included brothers Gianni (Marc Bannerman) and Beppe (Michael Greco), sister Teresa (Leila Birch) and mother Rosa (Louise Jameson).

Despite all being talented and instantly recognisable, Carly left the soap along with most of her on-screen family in August 2000. She then went on to appear in Harry and Cosh in 2002.

Hillman also had a spell with British R&B Girl Group Urban Lady during the early 2000s and released the song "Mutual" into the U.K. Charts in 2003.

Further TV appearances and Theatre credits transpired including All Star Talent Show, Soapstar Superchef and Celebrity Britains Best Dish, plus leading roles with RJ Williamson Shakespeare Company, New Vic Workshops and Ian Dickens Productions.

Hillman took a break from acting around 2009 to concentrate on starting a family. She is married to Ben Probert, and they have two daughters together.

She owns a stage school based in Romford, East London, called Act One Stage School.

== Television ==
- Eastenders (BBC)
- The All Star Talent Show (Channel 5)
- Soapstar Superchef (ITV)
- Soapstar Superstar (ITV)
- Head to Head Weekend (Nickelodeon)
- Celebrity Great British Dish (ITV)
- SMTV (ITV)
- Ministry of Mayhem (ITV)
- The Lowry Turner Show (BBC)
- Blue Peter (BBC)
- Big Breakfast (Channel 4)
- Trisha (ITV)
- This Morning (ITV)
- Royal Variety Show (BBC).

== Theatre credits ==
- 15 Minutes (New Vic Workshops, Arcola Theatre, London)
- Much Ado About Nothing (R.J Williamson)
- Twelfth Night (R.J Williamson)
- Daisy Pulls It Off (Ian Dickens Productions)
