= Leila Birch =

British actress

- Born: Leila Birch; London, England
- Education: Italia Conti Academy of Theatre Arts
- Occupations: Actress, Voice actress
- Years active: 1988–present
- Website: http://www.leilabirch.com/

Leila Birch (born 1978) is an English actress and voice actress, best known for voicing The Enchantress in Harley Quinn and portraying Teresa di Marco in EastEnders.

== Background ==
Birch grew up in South East London. She is of British, Italian and Irish descent. She trained at the Italia Conti Academy of Theatre Arts from 1987 to 1997, graduating with a Diploma in Performing Arts, and also studied Shakespeare at RADA and Drama at Yale University. She has one elder brother. Her father is Dr James Green a former RAF officer. Her great-aunt was one of the Gaiety Girls.

Birch is based in the United States as of at least 2012.

== Career ==
Birch played the role of Teresa di Marco in the BBC One soap opera EastEnders between 1998 and 2000. Her other television credits include One Night of Shakespeare, The Bill, Doctors, Thief Takers and Renford Rejects. She also appeared in the pilot episode of the NBC Universal series Day One.

Birch's stage work includes plays at the award-winning Arcola Theatre, outdoor Shakespeare festivals, national tours and pantomime. In 2007, she acted with 'Shakespeare in the Valley', New Hampshire's only professional outdoor repertory Shakespeare festival. She also appeared in the world premiere of Twelfth Night: The Musical in London.

In 2013 she played the role of British reporter Melody Stone in W.M.D., and in 2014 voiced the WABAC machine in the film Mr. Peabody and Sherman and pedestrians in the video game Infamous Second Son.
