= Michael Greco (actor) =

British actor and poker player

- Born: Michael Greco; 12 November 1970 (age 55); Sutton, Greater London, England
- Occupation: Actor
- Partner: Helen Harris
- Children: 1

Michael Greco (born 12 November 1970) is a British actor and poker player. He is best known for his role as Beppe di Marco in the BBC soap opera EastEnders, which he played for four years between 1998 and 2002.

== Film ==
In summer 2006, he finished filming the leading role in the independent feature film Naked in London, opposite another ex-EastEnder Jake Maskall. Eventually, the film was released in 2011 under the name Moving Target.

== Theatre ==
Greco starred in a modernised pop musical version of Aladdin, as the villain "Pickanchoos", at Poole's Lighthouse Theatre during the 2007 Christmas and New Year Season.

He also started as FleshCreep in the Ipswich pantomime, Jack and The Beanstalk 2024

== Television ==
Greco became widely known for his role as Beppe Di Marco in the soap opera EastEnders, joining the show in 1998. His character was developed as part of the show's introduction of the Di Marco family, the majority of whom featured until all characters with the exception of Beppe and his son Joe were axed from the show in the year 2000. Greco continued to feature among various storylines until his departure in 2002. The Sunday Mirror reported he was sacked from the show after voicing his displeasure with his character's storylines and alleged jealousy of other actors' scripts. Greco profusely denied the speculation and stated he had resigned from the show solely due to no longer wanting celebrity status and still holds the show in high regard. He also stated he would happily consider a return to the show if offered.

Greco appeared in Celebrity Love Island in 2005. He was a contestant on ITV's Soapstar Superstar in January 2006, and played in the Rest of the World team versus Prestonpans in the Soccer Aid match in 2006. Greco was the voiceover person on the TV documentary show America's Hardest Bounty Hunters, on the Australian pay-TV Crime and Investigation channel (FOXTEL). In May 2017, Greco played a police officer in British medical drama series Casualty. Michael also played a role in the Netflix series Queen Cleopatra in 2023.

== Poker ==
Greco is a keen poker player.

He appeared in the 2005 Poker Million, World Speed Poker Open and Monte Carlo Millions, as well as for Team Italy in the PartyPoker.com Football & Poker Legends Cup.

Greco made the Grand Final of the 2006 Showbiz Poker event. He finished second when his K♦ Q♦ made two pair on the 8♦ Q♥ K♠ flop, but the 4♥ 10♣ that followed allowed Norman Pace to complete his straight from his A♦ J♣ hole cards. He also finished second to Pace in the semi-final round and in the celebrity heat of the PartyPoker.com World Open.

European Poker Tour Cashes

- Season 2 – Dublin – €4,000 buy in – 7th Place (from 248 players) – winning €39,800

World Series of Poker Cashes

- 2007 – $2,000 buy-in No-Limit Hold'em – 30th Place – winning $14,350
- 2008 – $2,000 buy-in Pot-Limit Hold'em – 9th Place – winning $22,972
- 2009 – $1,500 buy-in No-Limit Hold'em – 3rd Place – winning $248,555
- 2009 Main Event – $10,000 World Championship No Limit Hold'em – 170th Place (from 6496 players) – winning $36,626

His total live tournament winnings exceed $1,114,297.

== Personal life ==
Greco became a first-time father at 51 with girlfriend Helen Harris.
