= Irene Raymond =

Fictional character from the BBC soap opera EastEnders

- EastEnders character
- Portrayed by: Roberta Taylor
- Duration: 1997–2000
- First appearance: Episode 1489; 14 August 1997
- Last appearance: Episode 1996; 31 August 2000
- Introduced by: Jane Harris
- Spin-off appearances: Pudding Lane (1999)
In-universe information
- Occupation: Shopkeeper
- Father: Frank Carter
- Mother: Winifred Carter
- Sisters: Jenny Harris
- Husband: Ted Hills (backstory); Terry Raymond (1998–present)
- Sons: Tony Hills
- Daughters: Sarah Hills
- Stepsons: Simon Raymond
- Stepdaughters: Tiffany Mitchell
- Aunts: Maureen Carter
- Nieces: Nina Harris

Irene Raymond (also Hills) is a fictional character from the BBC soap opera EastEnders, played by Roberta Taylor. Introduced in 1997 as the matriarch of the Hills family, Irene remained in the serial until 2000, when the actress opted to leave. Involved in comical and dramatic storylines, Irene is paired romantically with Terry Raymond (Gavin Richards), and is prominently featured as part of the 1999 Christmas Day episodes, where her extra-marital affair with a toy boy is discovered by Terry. Her departure storyline was filmed on-location in Spain, where she ends her marriage to Terry.

== Creation and development ==
Irene was introduced in 1997 as the estranged mother of the already established characters Sarah (Daniela Denby-Ashe) and Tony Hills (Mark Homer). Her introduction followed the axing of the Hills' family patriarch Ted Hills (Brian Croucher), who departed the serial the episode before Irene's arrival. Taylor was asked to play Irene by the producers, commenting, "When I was asked to play her I said I didn't mind what she was like as long as she didn't wear a cardigan!". She has claimed that she based the somewhat comical and sarcastic characterisation of Irene on her deceased mother and sisters, adding, "They wouldn't have liked it if I didn't make you laugh. That was their whole raison d'etre."

Author Kate Lock has described Irene as "restless" and an unlikely "sex siren". While author Rupert Smith has stated that she was "flighty, bitchy and self-centred [...] the mother from hell", but noted that she was a "breath of fresh air when compared to her ghastly children". Irene was instantly paired romantically with Terry Raymond (Gavin Richards), and Rupert Smith has suggested that in Terry, Irene "met her match in dreadfulness" and likened them to a "geriatric Romeo and Juliet". He went on to say that, "separately, the Hills and Raymonds were disastrous, dysfunctional families. Joined together, as they were by Terry and Irene's distasteful romance, they were unbearable."

In 2000, Taylor announced that she was leaving EastEnders. She had originally planned to leave the year before but she decided to stay when she saw the storyline that had been penned for Irene. Producers were disappointed by her decision to leave, with one source commenting, "Roberta's an outstanding actress who brought a little extra magic to Walford. We would have loved her to stay."

Taylor said: "EastEnders has been a fantastic experience but I'm pleased to be leaving. I was always thinking, 'When can I learn my lines?' I gave over much of my life to the show and if I was to carry on at such a pace I'd have to continue to put my life on hold. I didn't want to do things at half-cock [...] I had a lot of fun playing Irene, and Gavin, who plays my screen husband Terry, and I got on brilliantly. Irene was a complicated lady. I never knew what was going to happen next, but that's what life is like. We worked hard at our characters. People thought we were comical but actually there was a lot of sarcasm."

When asked if she would return in 2002, Taylor stated that she would be open to a one-off return, not a full-time comeback.

== Storylines ==
Irene is the ex-wife of Ted Hills (Brian Croucher) and the estranged mother of Sarah and Tony Hills (Daniela Denby-Ashe/Mark Homer), and she arrives in Albert Square following Ted's departure to Dubai in August 1997. She comes to stay with her children after she was fleeced out of her divorce settlement by a conman. Her children are initially hostile to her for being absent for so many years, as is her sister-in-law Kathy (Gillian Taylforth), who resents her for her treatment of her brother. Irene soon manages to sway her children's opinion back in her favour and they begin to grow close, although she does manage to ruin her son's relationship with Simon Raymond (Andrew Lynford), when she reveals Tony's fling with his colleague Polly Becker (Victoria Gould).

It isn't long before Irene finds an eligible man to flirt with, and this happens to be the recovering alcoholic Terry Raymond (Gavin Richards). Their romance soon begins to blossom and it isn't long before they plan to marry. The ceremony takes place in 1998, but just as Terry is about to say "I do", his first wife, Louise (Carol Harrison), halts the proceedings by announcing that she and Terry are still married. Irene is furious and humiliated, but Terry manages to win her round and they decide to go on their honeymoon anyway. Despite this hitch, Irene goes on to marry Terry, secretly at a register office, after his divorce from Louise has been finalised. Irene becomes good friends with local restaurant owner Rosa di Marco (Louise Jameson) and she is a fan of any new-age fad she ever comes across; during her time she participates in feng shui, aromatherapy, and meditation, much to the bemusement of her sceptical husband. Together, Terry and Irene run the local grocery store, 'The First Til Last'.

Despite Terry's desperate attempts to please Irene, he always seems to manage to get it wrong and their relationship is often volatile, with Irene seemingly unable to communicate what she really wants of Terry. Things reach an all-time low when Irene starts going through menopause in 1999. She often gets severely emotional, depressed, and irritated, particularly with Terry, who often unintentionally humiliates her about her condition. Terry is incapable of doing anything right in Irene's eyes at this time. Irene's restless nature means that she soon begins to tire of married life with Terry and in 1999, after continual chasing, Irene succumbs to the advances of her lodger Troy Harvey (Jamie Jarvis). Troy is considerably younger than Irene (almost half her age), and although he makes her feel special and desirable, Troy is only playing the field and later tries it on with Irene's best friend Rosa. Irene refuses to believe Rosa however and the affair continues. Things reach a head on Christmas Day in 1999. Terry discovers a watch that Irene had got engraved for Troy and suddenly understands what has been occurring. Terry is hurt, but his angst is directed at Troy and not Irene. After sending Irene on an errand, he confronts Troy and evicts him without his wife knowing. When Irene returns she is devastated to learn that Troy has gone. Terry forgives Irene, but the marriage is severely strained and Irene is never fully content or happy with her life after Troy's departure.

Terry is desperate to hang on to Irene, so after a man smashes his van into the First 'til Last by mistake, Terry uses the insurance money to buy her a holiday in a luxury villa in Alicante, Spain in 2000. Irene is over the moon but her joy soon turns to rage when she discovers that Terry has invited fellow Walford residents Frank and Peggy Butcher (Mike Reid and Barbara Windsor), as well as Roy and Pat Evans (Tony Caunter and Pam St. Clement). Whilst on holiday, Terry begins to despair over Irene's obvious unhappiness with their marriage and her complaints about her dull life in Walford. In an attempt to 'call her bluff' he sets Irene up with a rented car, gives her a wad of money and suggests that she leave there and then and travel the world like she has always dreamed. Unluckily for Terry, Irene leaps at the chance of freedom and leaves him, and he goes back to Walford alone. Her current location is unknown, although when Terry departs in 2002 he contacted Irene to give their marriage another chance.

== Reception ==
Taylor told Sharon Marshall in 2000 that, following the storyline where Irene had an affair with a toy boy, she was harassed by younger men: "I get letters from young men outlining exactly what they want to do to me. They're pretty detailed. I even get sex offers in the street. One guy, a very pretty boy in his twenties, sent me a letter containing all the explicit things he would like to do to Irene. It was shocking. Another guy marched up to me in a London store and demanded to know if he was young enough to go to bed with me."

The Christmas Day 1999 scenes in EastEnders involving Terry, Troy and Irene were described as "compelling viewing" by Merle Brown, critic for the Daily Record. She added, "All three played their parts excellently, especially Gavin Richards as Terry, who actually made you feel heartfelt sorrow for his usually despicable character."

The character of Irene was praised by Gareth Mclean, television critic of The Guardian, who noted the development that had occurred in her narrative: "When Irene first appeared in Walford [...] she was a harpie in a satinette dressing gown. But [...] her transformation into sympathetic, thwarted heroine [is now] complete. Never entirely happy with Terry - and even less so since her plundering of Troy [...] and when [Irene] broke, the torrent of rage, frustration, self- loathing and self-doubt that Roberta Taylor unleashed was undeniably moving."
