= Ted Hills =

Fictional character from the soap opera EastEnders

- EastEnders character
- Portrayed by: Brian Croucher
- Duration: 1995–1997
- First appearance: Episode 1175; 24 August 1995
- Last appearance: Episode 1488; 12 August 1997
In-universe information
- Occupation: Hardware store owner
- Father: Dennis Hills
- Mother: Brenda Hills
- Brothers: Colin Hills; Jonathan Hills
- Sisters: Kathy Beale; Stephanie Hills
- Wife: Irene Carter (backstory)
- Sons: Tony Hills
- Daughters: Sarah Hills
- Nephews: Ian Beale; Ben Mitchell

Ted Hills is a fictional character from the BBC soap opera EastEnders, played by Brian Croucher. He was introduced in 1995 as the patriarch of the Hills family, who are the extended family of established character Kathy Beale (Gillian Taylforth). Croucher was axed from EastEnders in 1997, after having been in the show for just under two years.

== Creation and development ==
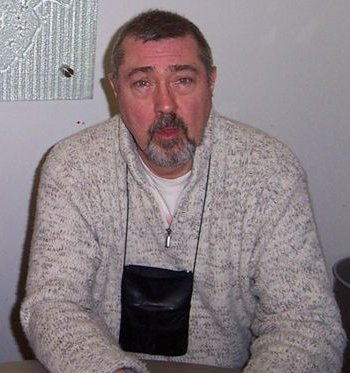
Brian Croucher (pictured) originally auditioned for the part of Roy Evans before he was cast as Ted Hills.

Brian Croucher was selected to play Ted Hills after auditioning for the part of Roy Evans in 1994. Croucher was short-listed to play Roy, a love interest for Pat Butcher (Pam St Clement), but producers of the show decided they did not want to use him for Roy. This part went to Tony Caunter and Croucher was instead cast as Ted Hills, the older brother of original character Kathy Beale (Gillian Taylforth). Ted was the patriarch of a family of three, introduced in 1995. In his storyline, Ted moved back to Walford, the area he was born and raised in, with his son Tony Hills (Mark Homer) and daughter Sarah Hills (Daniela Denby-Ashe).

In 1997, Brian Croucher was axed from the show. It was reported that his character Ted would "go out with a bang". A source said, "Brian was near the end of his contract and it was an opportunity to create a classic EastEnders moment."

== Storylines ==
=== Backstory ===
Ted grew up in Walford and came from an impoverished family headed by an alcoholic father. He was protective towards his family, in particular his younger sister Kathy (Gillian Taylforth), so when she started dating a local named Pete Beale (Peter Dean) c.1965, Ted initially took a dislike to him. Pete seemingly won Ted's blessing and for a while Ted worked with Pete on his market stall. One day Ted asked Pete if he could store some of his stuff in his lock-up overnight. Pete agreed and that night the police came and found stolen goods in the lock-up. Pete was arrested but would not implicate Ted and came close to being imprisoned as a result. Pete's best friend Den Watts (Leslie Grantham) believed Ted had planted the stolen goods on purpose to get Pete in trouble. Den threatened Ted's life so Ted fled from Walford.

Ted married Irene Carter (Roberta Taylor) and they had two children, Tony (Mark Homer) in 1976 and Sarah (Daniela Denby-Ashe) in 1980. Irene was discontent in marriage and she left Ted and her children. Ted's building company got into trouble because of a health and safety "accident" and he was fined for negligence when an employee died of injuries while working for Ted. In actuality, the boy's death was not an accident; Ted's friend, Jimmy Doyle (Patrick Duggan) had killed him when he tried to warn the boy away from sexually harassing 14-year-old Sarah. Jimmy hit the boy and he fell from scaffolding and died. Ted covered for Jimmy because in the past, Jimmy had taken the blame for a crime Ted committed and had served a prison sentence. Ted's family started to get victimized by the dead boy's family and were forced to leave their area of residence in 1995.

=== 1995–1997 ===
After 30 years away, Ted returns to Walford in 1995 with his children after hearing of Den (believed dead at the time) and Pete's deaths. His return is not welcomed by Pete's sister, Pauline Fowler (Wendy Richard), who still blames him for almost ruining her brother's life. Baker (Martyn Read), the father of the boy Jimmy killed, follows Ted to Walford and makes threats towards his family. Kathy's husband Phil Mitchell (Steve McFadden) intervenes and informs Baker that Ted is not responsible for the boy's murder as he suspects, but that Jimmy is. Jimmy is beaten by the Bakers and decides to flee Walford so Ted and his family will be safe. Ted purchases a shop on Bridge Street and names it 'Hills' Hardware'; he attempts to get Tony involved, but Tony is largely uninterested.

Ted is strict and overprotective of his family and has a bad temper which gets him into trouble. He struggles when he finds out that his son Tony is bisexual and nearly disowns him, losing many friends in the Square as a result. When his daughter Sarah runs away, he beats Robbie Jackson (Dean Gaffney) unconscious and puts him in hospital, suspecting that he has raped Sarah. In fact, Sarah had propositioned Robbie and fled Walford in shame after they had sex. Ted later receives a two-year suspended sentence for the attack on Robbie. Ted's behaviour frequently alienates his children and is his main source of conflict in Walford.

By 1997, Ted's business is floundering; he runs up huge debts and has to close the shop. When he is offered a job on a building project in Dubai, he accepts, leaving Walford and his children who refuse to go with him. He later moves to South Africa, and is joined there by Kathy in 1998.

== Reception ==
Lewis Knight from Radio Times opined that Ted "had a disastrous professional and personal period" during his stint on the soap.
