= Peggy Mitchell =

Fictional character from EastEnders

- EastEnders character
- Barbara Windsor as Peggy Mitchell (2008)
- Portrayed by: Jo Warne (1991); Barbara Windsor (1994–2016); Jaime Winstone (2022, 2025; flashbacks)
- Duration: 1991, 1994–2010, 2013–2016, 2022, 2025
- First appearance: Episode 650; 30 April 1991
- Last appearance: Episode 7066; 13 February 2025
- Introduced by: Michael Ferguson (1991); Barbara Emile (1994); Louise Berridge (2004); Kate Harwood (2005); Lorraine Newman (2013); Dominic Treadwell-Collins (2014); Chris Clenshaw (2022, 2025)
- Spin-off appearances: The Mitchells – Naked Truths (1998); Children in Need (2005); Marsden's Video Diaries (2010)
- Jo Warne as Peggy Mitchell (1991)
In-universe information
- Other names: Peggy Butcher
- Occupation: Barmaid; Businesswoman; Pub landlady
- Family: Mitchell
- Father: Jack Martin
- Mother: Lilly Martin
- Sisters: Sal Martin
- Husband: Eric Mitchell (backstory); Frank Butcher (1999–2001); Archie Mitchell (2009)
- Sons: Phil Mitchell; Grant Mitchell
- Daughters: Sam Mitchell
- Stepsons: Ricky Butcher
- Stepdaughters: Janine Butcher; Diane Butcher; Clare Butcher; Ronnie Mitchell; Roxy Mitchell
- Grandsons: Ben Mitchell; Mark Fowler Jnr; Ricky Branning; Raymond Fox; Albie Watts
- Granddaughters: Louise Mitchell; Courtney Mitchell
- Nephews: Lenny Martin
- Nieces: Loretta Martin
- Other relatives: Lexi Pearce; Peggy Taylor; Charli Slater

Peggy Mitchell (also Butcher) is a fictional character from the BBC soap opera EastEnders. Introduced as the mother of established characters Phil (Steve McFadden), Grant (Ross Kemp) and Sam Mitchell (Danniella Westbrook/Kim Medcalf), Peggy was initially played by Jo Warne when she first appeared in the episode broadcast on 30 April 1991, featuring in 10 episodes. Peggy was reintroduced in 1994, recast to Barbara Windsor, who made her first appearance in the episode broadcast on 7 November 1994. Peggy became a regular character, and Windsor played the role until she was forced to take a long break due to poor health and departed on 23 May 2003. She returned for two episodes broadcast on 16 and 17 September 2004, before returning as a regular character on 8 September 2005. Windsor announced in October 2009 that she would be leaving the show and departed on 10 September 2010. Windsor returned to the show for guest appearances on 20 September 2013, 25 September 2014, 17 February 2015 (as part of the show's 30th anniversary celebrations) and 15 January 2016. She then appeared in six episodes between 9 and 17 May 2016, where the character was killed off. Her voice is last heard in the following episode, on 19 May 2016. Peggy's funeral aired on 4 July 2016. An archived recording of her voice was heard on 25 January 2022. On 26 July 2022, it was announced that Peggy would feature in a flashback episode set in 1979, alongside her husband Eric and their children Phil, Grant and Sam. Jaime Winstone played the role of Peggy for this special episode, which aired on 5 September 2022. She returned again in 2025 to appear as part of a mental health storyline for Phil and she made a guest appearance on 13 February.

Peggy is fiercely protective of her family and the Mitchell name, and is famous for her catchphrase "Get outta my pub!", used when ejecting people from The Queen Victoria during her reign as the landlady. Her storylines have included a series of failed romances, most notably a non-lasting marriage with established character Frank Butcher (Mike Reid) and then a short-lived wedding to her brother-in-law Archie Mitchell (Larry Lamb). She has also been central to several plotlines revolving around health issues; launching a hate campaign against the HIV positive character Mark Fowler (Todd Carty) before later going on to make amends with him when she is later diagnosed with breast cancer, which she recovers from; a longstanding feud with daughter-in-law Sharon Watts (Letitia Dean); an on-off rivalry and companionship with her frenemy Pat Evans (Pam St Clement); and clashing with many villains such as Frank's troublesome daughter Janine Butcher (Charlie Brooks) and gangland boss Johnny Allen (Billy Murray). Peggy's final storyline saw her cancer return in 2016, which ultimately leads to the character being killed-off when she commits suicide.

== Creation ==
Peggy was introduced as a guest character in April 1991, by executive producer Michael Ferguson. The character was brought in as the mother of the already established Mitchell clan: Phil (Steve McFadden), Grant (Ross Kemp) and Sam (Danniella Westbrook). Specifically, she played a key role in a storyline about the elopement of her daughter Sam with Ricky Butcher (Sid Owen). Peggy was played by actress Jo Warne for a period of three months, but was written out upon the completion of the storyline. Two other actresses had been cast in the part before Warne: the first quit before she could film any scenes, and the second, Frances Cuka (who had appeared in the EastEnders prequel CivvyStreet), filmed eight episodes, though all of her scenes were scrapped before broadcast.

The character did not make another appearance until 7 November 1994, when she was reintroduced by series producer Barbara Emile as a regular character. The actress was recast, the role being taken over by Barbara Windsor, already well known to viewers as a comic actress, notably appearing in the long-running Carry On films. Scott Matthewman of The Stage commented on the recast in 2006: "Quite the biggest – and most inexplicable – transformation is that of Peggy Mitchell in EastEnders. While Barbara Windsor has dominated the role...first appearing in [1994], the character had appeared briefly [three] years earlier, played by Jo Warne, a lady who physically is as different from our Babs as it's possible to get."

Steve McFadden and Ross Kemp had attempted to persuade EastEnders writer Tony Jordan to develop a spin-off for their characters, which would star Windsor as Peggy. The idea never advanced beyond informal discussions, but when the producers decided to reintroduce Peggy, McFadden and Kemp suggested Windsor play her. Windsor had previously expressed a desire to join the cast of EastEnders. Chat show host Chris Evans of Channel 4's The Big Breakfast made a public broadcast instructing viewers to fax or phone the BBC with pleas for Windsor's instatement. However, Windsor was already in negotiations with the BBC about appearing in the serial. June Deitch, the EastEnders casting director, had met with Windsor to discuss the matter, and was convinced when Windsor declared that she would "like to play my own age for a change". At the time, the producers had already thought about reintroducing Peggy, and Windsor was cast despite originally being considered too "well-known". Windsor has spoken of her "terrified" reaction to being asked to audition, commenting: "I had the weekend to prepare and I cried all the time. I didn't know how to do soap acting. I was so used to using my hands, my eyes." She auditioned with two scenes, one emotion, one "jolly" which Windsor has described as "agony", explaining: "I was afraid of playing Barbara Windsor, so when I had to laugh I went 'huh, huh'. Anything rather than 'tee, hee, hee'." In an interview with the Walford Gazette, a US-based newspaper dedicated to EastEnders, Windsor commented on her casting: "I was thrilled, I could rest my tired bones working on a marvelous television show that I deeply respected. I was very excited about the possibility [of] playing this feisty lady who would come in and shake up her two boys' lives."

Windsor has been described as the biggest "name" that EastEnders has ever added to its cast, and her arrival came at a time in the show's history that has been branded its "worst creative period". Mark Lawson for The Independent wrote that Windsor's casting was intended to combat low ratings, commenting: "The Windsor initiative seems to be a direct response to suggestions that EastEnders has become too gloomy: a view heavily advanced by Roy Hattersley, former deputy leader of the Labour Party, and fan of the BBC series' rival on ITV, Coronation Street. Certainly, Miss Windsor has been associated throughout her career with the lighter touch." According to Windsor, 27 million viewers watched her first appearance as Peggy on-screen. Mark Lawson for The Daily Telegraph has stated that five million extra viewers watched her first scenes, reporting that initially: "The critics said that she lacked the 'brassiness and vulnerability' for soap acting and that, stripped of her bubbly image, 'nothing much of interest was revealed'. Ironically, viewers complained that she was too upmarket." Windsor has commented of the impact of her pre-existing celebrity status:

Wendy Richard [who played Pauline Fowler] certainly had name value but I suppose it was regarded differently because she was part of the original cast. When I was brought on [to EastEnders] the press made such a big deal. They made it seem like I was brought on to 'save' EastEnders or something, which was ridiculous...the show decided to move into the "Sharongate" storyline, which gave it an enormous push, creatively and ratings-wise. Peggy was brought on as an extension of the Sharongate story because she was Phil and Grant's mum. I understand why the show was uneasy about bringing on any really well known actors because they want the audience [to] believe in and identify with the character without having any of the actor's baggage in their heads...

=== Characterisation ===
"Get outta my pub!"
Peggy's famous catchphrase, from the 1 April 2008 episode of EastEnders.

Hilary Kingsley, author of The EastEnders Handbook (1991), has described Peggy as tough, with a "knack for getting her own way". She adds, "Peggy likes to think she looks much younger [than she is]. She's flash, fast-talking and nobody's fool. She has always done things her own way, and heaven help anyone who crosses her, though her bark's usually worse than her bite."

When Windsor took over the role in 1994, she was unhappy with the way Peggy was being scripted. She has commented, "a few things weren't quite right about Peggy at the beginning. On a purely superficial level, the wig didn't fit right. And the clothes weren't right either. They appeared too downmarket. I was particularly worried about how the character was viewed by the producer and writers. I saw her as much ballsier than they did. I think they envisioned Peggy as this rather sad, vulnerable lady who spent all her time worrying about her children." However, early in 1995, EastEnders acquired a new executive producer, Corinne Hollingworth, who shared Windsor's vision of Peggy. It was Hollingworth who decided that Peggy would be a central character, the new landlady of The Queen Victoria public house, one of the soap's main focal points. Hollingworth stated that Peggy was "not going to be allowed to just sit in some flat polishing her nails". Windsor has said: "It was like a dream. [Hollingworth] let me go out with the costume designer and choose Peggy's wardrobe, which needed to be a lot more flash and upmarket. Corinne and I worked on getting Peggy right and I finally began to believe...".

Windsor has described Peggy as "from the old school, the generation which doesn't put up with rubbish from anybody...She can get through practically anything because she's tough, tough, tough." The character has been classified by Rupert Smith, author of EastEnders: 20 Years in Albert Square, as a matriarch, assuming "papal infallibility. Whatever anybody does — particularly her own children — she knows better." She has also been branded a "battleaxe" by Dave West of entertainment website Digital Spy, and someone who "wears her heart on her sleeve" by Windsor. Family-orientated, Windsor adds that: "[Peggy] loves her family with a passion. Her worst qualities are that she's blinkered, sometimes wrongly passionate about her family."

It has been speculated that Windsor based Peggy on Violet Kray, mother of the infamous East End gangsters, the Kray twins; however Windsor has denied this. Instead, she claims that Peggy is based on women she has seen in East End pubs and her own mother: "women whose hair is great and their outfits are more Walthamstow market, they get it wrong slightly...Some things I've done with Peggy is from my Mum. She was one of those East End snobs. I drew on all of those experiences." In a 2009 radio interview with Dale Winton, Windsor said three people have influenced her portrayal of Peggy: Violet Kray (thus retracting her earlier statement), her own mother, and the wife of actor Mike Reid, who played her on-screen husband Frank Butcher.

== Development ==
Peggy has been central to numerous high-profile storylines, including a battle with breast cancer, a failed marriage to Frank Butcher, and various business and family upsets.

=== Breast cancer ===
In 1996, Peggy featured in a storyline about breast cancer. It was the first time that the soap had given one of its characters the illness, though the issue was covered much less substantially in 1987 as a means of promoting breast cancer screening, when Sue Osman (Sandy Ratcliff) discovered a lump on her breast, which turned out to be benign.

Peggy's breast cancer storyline was devised at the suggestion of a scriptwriter in a story conference session and, according to the production staff, was an idea "that had been knocking about for a long time." In Lesley Henderson's book, Social Issues in Television Fiction, an EastEnders researcher explains that: "A lot of illnesses [...] translate quite readily into strong dramatic material", and the experience of being hospitalised or waiting on test results is something everyone can identify with. The programme sought expert advice on "storyline visuals" from a variety of sources including cancer organisations, breast cancer charities and medical professionals. There were anticipated problems with running a breast cancer story, such as timing, characterisation, casting, and interweaving the plot with other ongoing storylines. A story editor has explained: "EastEnders is perceived as being an issue-led show, but it isn't, it's character and story-led [...] If you haven't got the character to fulfill that storyline then it won't work. You've got to be careful to make sure that the illness actually impacts on the family dynamics and the character development."

Producers decided to use Peggy in the breast cancer storyline, conforming to a soap opera tradition of reserving strong roles for a firmly established middle-aged matriarch. The audience were familiar with Peggy's history, knew that her first husband had died from cancer, consequently making her fear hospitals, and she had: "the right mentality for [the story theme], which was about 'a woman who discovers a lump and then refuses to accept that anything's wrong'. An added factor was that in choosing Peggy the programme could avoid appearing too issue driven, and [the] storyline could be used as a device to expand and develop her characterisation." Additionally, as the causes of breast cancer are not attributable to risky behaviour, the disease was deemed "more attractive" in storyline terms. A member of the EastEnders production team explains:

If you take a character who smokes and they get lung cancer that would seem too issue-driven. The great thing about a character like Peggy is [her breast cancer was] quite unexpected. At the time there were lots of other issues in her life. She was a character who audiences had only seen pulling pints behind the bar. Suddenly she was in a new environment in a hospital and had a huge medical crisis to go through, so that allowed the character to grow and expand in many ways...There was also fairly major moments [...] with Peggy and [her boyfriend George Palmer (Paul Moriarty)]. She thought George wouldn't love her any more after she'd had the operation. We were able to use the illness to take them on a new journey.

In the view of the production team, Peggy's breast cancer was a catalyst, creating new dynamics and tensions amongst existing characters. Realism was also an issue. As a middle-aged woman, Peggy was epidemiologically at higher risk for developing breast cancer. In 2001, it was reported that Peggy's character was one of only a few media portrayals of older females to be given the disease, and source organisations have praised EastEnders for this.

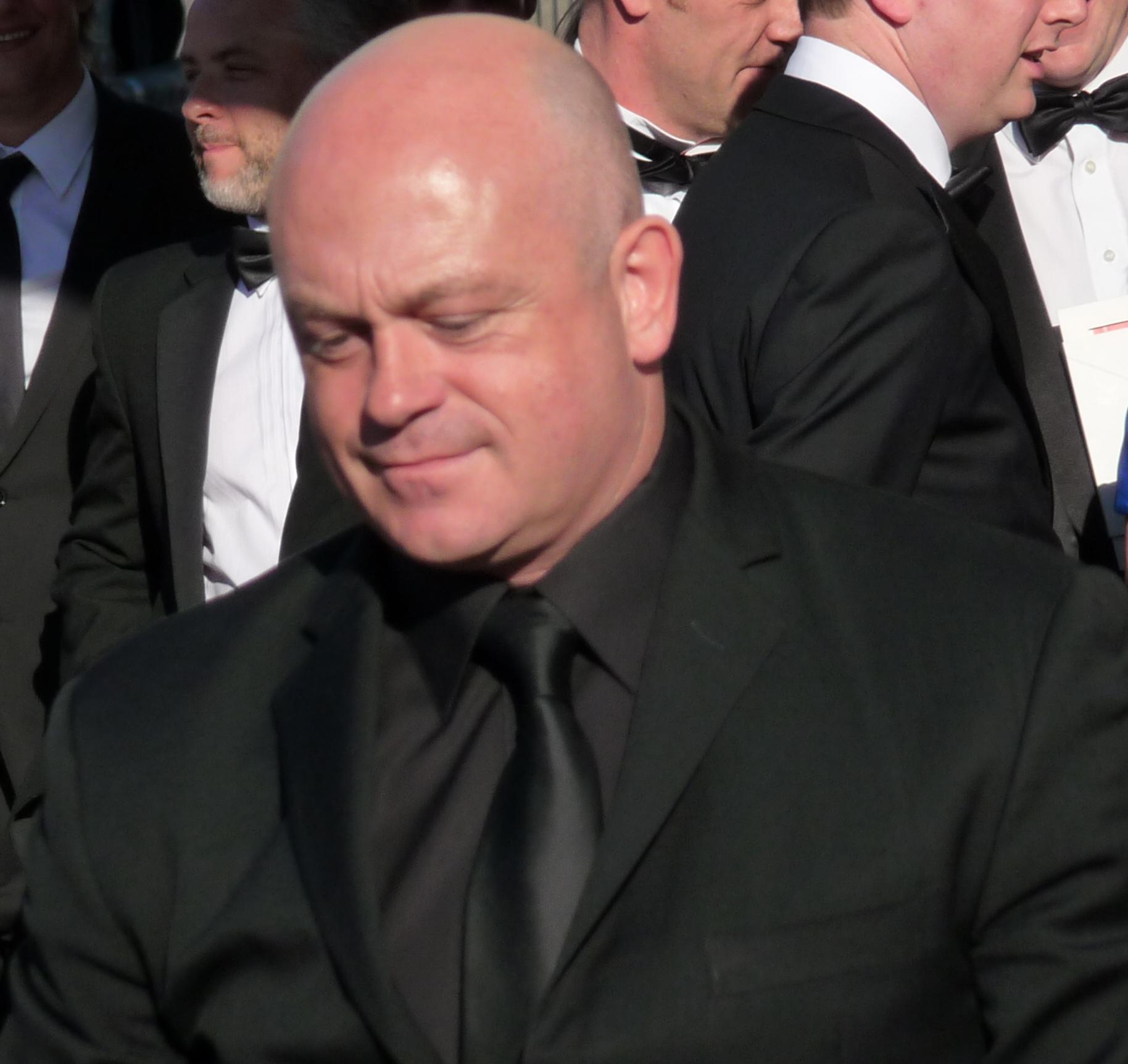
Ross Kemp plays Peggy's son Grant. The issue of whether Peggy's children would discover her breast cancer was used to build tension and create suspense in the viewing audience.

The storyline used elements of suspense, created by the use of "shared secrets" between Peggy and her daughter-in-law Tiffany Mitchell (Martine McCutcheon), who invented elaborate cover stories to mask Peggy's trips to hospital from her sons and partner. Tension was deliberately built for viewing pleasure, posing the questions of whether Peggy's lump was benign or malignant and whether she would die, but also in terms of Peggy's relationships, whether her children would discover the truth or if George would end their relationship. Henderson has suggested that: "such devises [added] pathos to Peggy's treatment path. Audiences [knew] that she [was] terrified and about to discover her biopsy results, but must watch as she is casually castigated by her son Grant for pestering his wife Tiffany to accompany her to 'the dentist'." Hospital scenes were also played for narrative pace to build tension and drama.

Because "radical, body-altering" surgery on a long-running character would cause the production team ongoing problems with continuity, it was decided that Peggy would have a "less visible" lumpectomy, rather than a mastectomy. A member of the EastEnders production team explained: "We have to think about costume and what it's going to look like afterwards and what we're lumbering ourselves with [...] you have to think of that for a long-term character." Additionally, giving Peggy a lumpectomy at that stage of her disease was viewed favourably by source organisations, as it helped to spread a message that a mastectomy is not necessary in all breast cancer cases. However, the storyline was revisited several times over the next few years. In August 1997, Peggy was given the "all-clear" at her follow-up mammogram, and in March 1999 the cancer returned and she underwent a mastectomy, while in 2000 she had a breast reconstruction. It has been reported that Peggy was the first soap opera character to undergo a mastectomy. BBC Production chief executive Matthew Bannister praised Windsor's portrayal of Peggy coming to terms with a mastectomy, commenting: "It's brought a good deal of comfort and help to us and a lot of other people."

Oncology nurses and consultants were involved in the development of the storyline, which was based on a real life case study. In Clive Seale's book, Health and the Media, EastEnders was praised for putting its message across without being "gruelling". It has also been praised for showing "potent scenes" of a woman coming to terms with her diagnosis, scenes that also provided "rare opportunities" to portray a cancer patient "behaving badly" and depicting "ambivalent feelings (such as denial or anger)" — as it had been noted that cancer patients are typically portrayed in the media as "beatific, serene figures". When Peggy had a mastectomy, hundreds of viewers wrote to the BBC to thank producer, Matthew Robinson for tackling "a difficult subject so sensitively". However, not all viewers were impressed with the storyline. Felicity Smart, who had undergone a mastectomy, wrote to the BBC on behalf of the Breast Carer Support Group at St Thomas' Hospital in London to say that emotionally the storyline "hit the spot", but medically it was "hopelessly inaccurate" as according to Smart: "No one pulls pints and wisecracks with customers three days after having a mastectomy."

=== Marriage to Frank Butcher ===
In 1998, Peggy was romantically paired on-screen with the character Frank Butcher (Mike Reid). Their coupling was part of producer Matthew Robinson's plan to place the focus of the soap back on to the Butcher and Mitchell families, while various other long-running characters were axed following a decline in ratings. The soap was attracting 15.74 million viewers in May 1998, as opposed to rival soap Coronation Street's 16 million.

Played by Mike Reid, Frank had been a regular character in the serial from 1987 to 1994, and had appeared in a recurring role until 1998, when Reid agreed to return full-time. Frank's history on the show included a former marriage to another long-running matriarch, Pat Butcher (Pam St. Clement). Their history as lovers featured prominently in Peggy's narrative in 1998, when, after agreeing to marry Frank, Peggy was wrongly told that Frank and Pat were having an affair. A special two-hander episode aired in November 1998, featuring only Pat and Peggy for the entire duration. It concentrated on Peggy's reaction to the suspected affair, whilst simultaneously addressing Pat's unresolved history with Frank and the apparent destruction of Pat's own marriage to Roy (Tony Caunter), who had also responded badly to the rumours about his wife's infidelity. The episode, written by Tony Jordan, featured what the Sunday Mirror described as one of "the most vicious fights ever filmed by a soap", with both throwing glasses at one another and Pat slapping Peggy across the face exclaiming "You bitch!" and Peggy responding by slapping Pat exclaiming "You cow!". According to press reports, the fight scene between the characters was "so powerful that it had to have scenes and dialogue cut so it could be screened before the 9 pm watershed." Barbara Windsor was reportedly bruised during the filming. Windsor commented, "The writer didn't want a namby- pamby cat fight between two silly girls. We were throwing chairs and bottles and the adrenaline was at a high. When I saw the programme I couldn't believe how good it was. Pam and I were really proud." The Sunday Mirror described it as: "one of the most impressive episodes of all time". In the climax of the storyline, both couples resolved their differences, and their relationships remained intact.

Peggy and Frank were married on-screen on 1 April 1999. A "hen night" was thrown for Windsor with the show's make-up team, and the BBC threw a "massive" party in the show's Albert Square to celebrate the event. Actors Windsor and Reid joined fellow stars, celebrities and TV executives for a celebration on the programme's set in Elstree, Hertfordshire. Windsor admitted she had been so nervous before filming the wedding she was sick on set. She commented, "I broke out in spots and threw up in the vestry. I was very nervous – we were both very nervous. The day you stop getting nervous you can hold your hands up. It shows you care." The soap wedding was filmed in Harrow, North West London in February 1999. A BBC spokesman commented: "It is one of the best weddings Walford has ever seen but it is not problem free. There are a lot of people who do not want to see Frank and Peggy married – Grant being one of them – and it remains to be seen whether they will get through the day without a major upset. And as if the wedding is not gripping enough, there are certainly shocking revelations back at the Vic." In the eventual episode, it was actually Grant Mitchell who persuaded his mother to marry Frank – with whom he had been feuding following his accidental killing of wife Tiffany – after Peggy was having second thoughts, thinking that Frank was only marrying her out of pity. Nearly 20 million viewers watched Peggy and Frank marry.

Together Frank and Peggy ran The Queen Victoria, and were involved in various family and business crises, including a "tug-of-war" for their public house with "cuckoo-in-the-nest" Dan Sullivan (Craig Fairbrass). After taking time off in 2000 due to ill-health, Reid announced that he was quitting the soap in May 2000. After Reid publicly declared that he would love Frank to have a last fling with Pat before he left, EastEnders' bosses granted his wish and an affair was scripted. The pair enjoyed a liaison on a Spanish beach during a week-long August special set on the Costa Blanca, which saw Frank and Peggy go away with Pat and Roy and Terry and Irene Raymond (Gavin Richards and Roberta Taylor). A BBC spokesperson said: "Pat is obviously incredibly torn between her love for her husband, Roy, and her old feelings for Frank. She's been hurt by Frank in the past, but she's coming to realise that she still has strong feelings for him and he has made no secret of his soft spot for her. I can confirm they do enjoy a romantic kiss on the beach." On-screen, Pat and Frank's affair continued until they decided, in November 2000, to elope. In the specially extended episode marking Frank's official exit — which aired on 2 November 2000, but was Guy Fawkes Night in the on-screen events – Peggy discovered the affair amidst Frank's attempt to retrieve a letter of confession, following Pat's change of heart.

After revealing their deception to a busy Queen Victoria public house, Peggy slapped both Pat and Frank, rebuffed Frank's attempt at reconciliation and left him to depart alone. In December 2000, Ian Hyland of the Sunday Mirror voted the scene in which Peggy slaps both Pat and Frank as one of the "TV fights of the year", saying "It was Peggy's speech which really made it a Bonfire Night to remember. But the slaps were equally well dispatched." Commenting on Reid's exit, Windsor has said, "We fell out when I found out he was leaving because it was a shock for me. I was really upset. I've known him 30 odd years and I really like working with him. We had a great relationship as friends as well as performers. I got my own back when I had to slap him after I found out he was fooling around with Pat. I did the slap twice as I didn't think I did it hard enough the first time."

=== Sabbatical ===
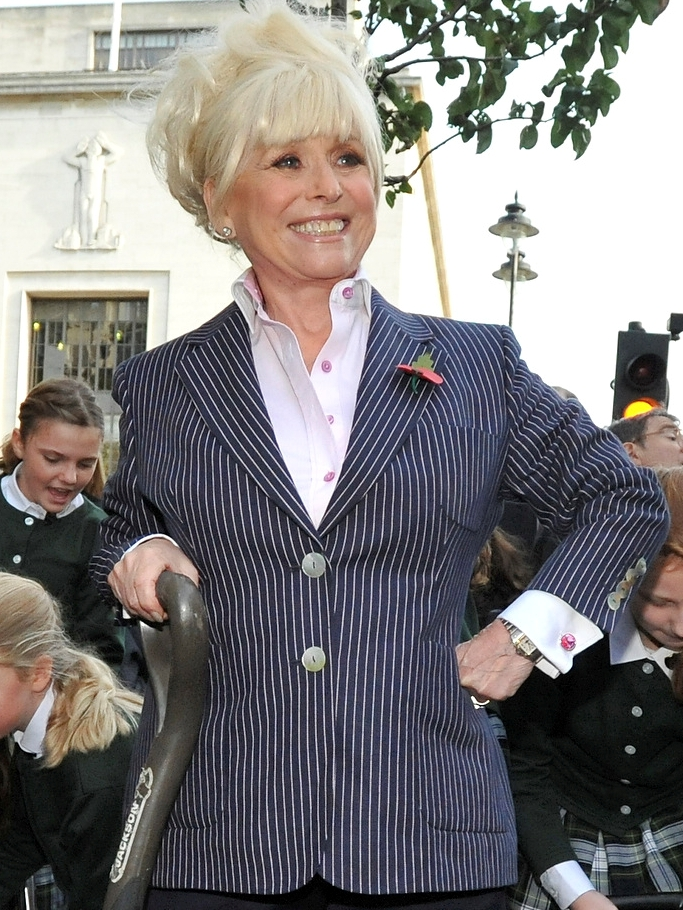
Windsor took a two-year sabbatical in 2003, having contracted the Epstein-Barr virus.

Peggy was written out of EastEnders in 2003, sent to live in Rio de Janeiro with her son Grant for two years, while Windsor took a sabbatical from the show after being diagnosed with the Epstein-Barr virus. Windsor had previously never taken more than two weeks leave annually during her eight years on the show, as Peggy was considered such a central character to the series. Windsor's absence was originally only supposed to be a year long. She stated at the time: "This has been a very hard decision for me to make because I'm so happy here on EastEnders but it's been a long time without a proper break. I just feel some time off would be good for me and for the character too." Louise Berridge, then EastEnders' executive producer, commented: "Barbara has been an absolute trouper for more than eight years on this show. We hope she has a great time and look forward to bringing her back with a big story in 2004."

Although Peggy did return briefly in 2004 to attend her daughter Sam's wedding to Andy Hunter (Michael Higgs), it was not until 2005 that she resumed her role as a series regular. Her full return was announced in January 2005, with John Yorke, the BBC controller of continuing drama series, stating he was "delighted" as "[Peggy] is a hugely loved character and one we think will be stirring things up from the moment she steps back into Walford." Windsor said that she was "over the moon" to return, adding: "I had a great time when I came back to film for a couple of weeks recently. It really reminded me that the square is where I feel at home." BBC executives hoped that Peggy's return would help to revive EastEnders' ratings. Her absence coincided with a two-year ratings slump for EastEnders, with David Liddiment in The Guardian drawing direct correlation between her return and the show's "ratings rejuvenation". The episode in which she returned was watched by 10 million viewers, winning EastEnders a 47% audience share in the timeslot.

=== Relationship with Archie Mitchell; running for local government ===
In March 2008, the BBC announced that Larry Lamb had been cast as Archie Mitchell, the brother of Peggy's late husband Eric. Archie was scripted as a love-interest for Peggy and Peggy's backstory was retconned to incorporate a romantic history with Archie. Portrayed as an adulterous villain, Archie began controlling Peggy, changing her clothing and her hair style and instructing her on how to behave.

In 2009 Peggy ran as an independent candidate in the local council elections against Archie's wishes. Writers wanted a storyline that allowed Peggy to stand up for her beliefs, and felt that running for local government would allow her to speak passionately about the community. After a scene showed Janine Butcher (Charlie Brooks) asking Peggy, "Where would Tony Blair have been without Alastair Campbell?", Campbell responded by giving advice to Peggy in a video blog. A response from Peggy was then recorded, thanking Campbell for his input. Peggy pulled out of the election at Archie's request ahead of their wedding, however the storyline set up a later episode in which Boris Johnson made a guest appearance in EastEnders. On 1 October 2009, Johnson appeared in the show as himself, visiting Walford and The Queen Victoria and conversing with Peggy. Johnson commented on his appearance: "It was, of course, a tremendous honour to step inside that most venerable of London landmarks, The Queen Vic, and share a scene with another of the capital's icons, the fabulous Barbara Windsor." Executive producer Diederick Santer stated: "We couldn't let the visit pass without the Mayor entering London's most famous pub, The Queen Vic, and meeting its formidable and politically active landlady Peggy Mitchell." The episode was watched by 8 million viewers, winning EastEnders a 38% audience share in the timeslot.

Peggy and Archie's wedding was filmed on location in North London in January 2009 and was screened on 2 April 2009 that year in an hour-long special. To promote the storyline, EastEnders screened a trailer showing Peggy being assembled in her wedding outfit by a robot, which symbolised Archie's control of her. Realising the extent to which Archie had been controlling and trying to change her throughout their engagement, Peggy gave him an ultimatum at the altar: he either accept the real her, or call the wedding off. Archie chose to marry her, though Tim Teeman for The Times commented: "'[T]he real Peggy' is a hazy concept: there's Peggy the big-hearted East End landlady and Peggy the crone famous for rasping 'Get ahht my pub' to anyone who crosses her path. For someone into evil mind control, Archie has brilliant taste. The wedding outfit he had chosen for Peggy was much nicer than the tatty net curtains that even Miss Havisham would have rejected that the 'real Peggy' chose to marry in." Peggy and Archie's wedding was watched by 10.6 million viewers, winning EastEnders a 48% audience share. A further 1.2 million viewers watched the episode's repeat on BBC Three at 10 pm. However, the marriage lasts only as long as the reception; when Peggy realises Archie has been manipulating other members of his family, Peggy throws him out and a feud ignites between Archie and the Mitchell clan.

Peggy resumes her plan to run for council in 2010, but is furious to discover that Pat is also running. The storyline introduces the character of Harvey Freeman, played by Martin Jarvis, a freelance journalist who is reporting on the election. Harvey is a potential love interest for both Peggy and Pat, and causes friction between the friends.

=== 2010 departure ===
On 28 October 2009 it was announced that Windsor had quit the show and would leave in 2010 after 15 years. She said: "EastEnders has been wonderful to me and it's no secret that it changed my life all of those years ago. I'll be so sad to leave Peggy behind; she's such a wonderful character to play. I have had the pleasure of working with a marvellous cast and crew and have made many lasting good friends. To have had the honour of showing the Queen around the set is something that will stay with me forever." Executive producer Diederick Santer said: "Barbara has contributed so much to EastEnders over the last 15 years, plus countless episodes, and countless amazing storylines. Peggy Mitchell is a truly iconic character, and along with Steve McFadden and Ross Kemp, Barbara has made the Mitchells the premier family of British soap." Windsor filmed her final scene on 16 July 2010. Peggy's final episode, which aired on 10 September 2010, was preceded by a number of television trailers in August and a new section on the EastEnders website dedicated to the character. The episode ended with a special reworking of the piano version of the EastEnders theme tune known as "Julia's Theme", called "Peggy's Theme". Tribute was then paid to her in a clip programme, Peggy Mitchell: Queen of the Vic. Peggy's final episode attracted 10.1 million viewers, and was the second most-watched programme in the week of 6–12 September.

At the recording of the new series of The Rob Brydon Show for BBC Two, Brydon asked if Windsor would consider returning, to which Windsor replied, "Never say never".

=== Breast cancer return and death ===
After making three separate returns in September 2013, September 2014 and another in February 2015 to commemorate 30 years of EastEnders during Live Week, Windsor made an unannounced return to EastEnders on 15 January 2016. After this, it was announced that the character was to be killed off, losing her battle with breast cancer. The scenes were filmed in secret in November 2015, following Windsor's personal decision for Peggy to be killed. She said: "Peggy is a character close to my heart but I made the decision a while ago that I need to say goodbye to Peggy once and for all as otherwise she will always be there, urging me to go back and that is something I need to shut the door on. After thinking long and hard about it, I realised that it is time for me and the audience to say our final farewells to the lady who I have loved for many years and I thought that whilst [executive producer Dominic Treadwell-Collins], who I adore, is still in charge I want him to be the one to oversee it. I am grateful that Dominic has accepted my decision and together, since late last summer, we have been secretly plotting Peggy's last scenes."

Treadwell-Collins said, "when [Windsor] told me her decision back in the summer [2015], we both had a little cry before getting excited about how Peggy Mitchell, the matriarch to end all matriarchs could bid her final farewell to Albert Square. In Peggy Mitchell, Barbara has created one of the greatest ever characters on British television, someone who has become as synonymous with EastEnders as The Queen Vic itself. So this is the end of an EastEnders era. But it is also an opportunity to send Peggy Mitchell out in style in what will be one of the most heartbreaking, uplifting and epic exits an EastEnders character has ever had. We can't wait to have Barbara back at EastEnders, even if it is for the final time. The most professional of professionals on set and off, and a true friend, we have all been working harder than ever to make Barbara and Peggy Mitchell proud." Windsor resumed filming on 21 March 2016.

On 3 May 2016, it was revealed that Peggy would refuse treatment and decide to spend time with her family. Windsor said it was a "special week" of episodes with "lots of surprises" that would be "a perfect ending for Peggy". Peggy's final scenes aired on 17 May 2016; however, her voice was heard in the following episode, which aired on 19 May 2016.

On 25 January 2022, the voice of Peggy is heard by Phil, who is contemplating whether to become an informant for the police, or spend the rest of his life behind bars. Phil hears Peggy's voice, telling him "Phil, you gotta get out there and defend what's yours" and "You're surrounded by people who love you, just try to love yourself...". Due to Windsor's death in December 2020, Peggy's soundbites were taken from archive footage from previous episodes.

== Storylines ==
=== Backstory ===
Peggy married Eric Mitchell (George Russo) because she was pregnant with their son Phil (Steve McFadden). Eric grew to be a keen boxer and he soon ended up working for his gangland boss, Johnny Allen (Billy Murray). This impacted the marriage as Johnny constantly taunted Eric, making him do demeaning jobs because Eric was a better boxer than him. Eric fell in love with a glamorous woman called Maureen Loftus and planned to elope with her, but he changed his mind at the last minute – unable to desert his family, who he grew to resent. Eric took his anger out on Peggy and was often violent towards her and Phil. The abuse eventually ended when Peggy told the police that Eric was involved in a Post office robbery and he was sent to prison. Peggy considered leaving when her sons, Phil and Grant (Ross Kemp) were teenagers, and once even tried to seduce Johnny, but he turned her down. It was then Eric had cheated on Peggy with Claudette Hubbard (Ellen Thomas), who he also intended to run away with, but he changed his mind again – leading to Claudette hating the entire family. Soon afterwards, Peggy turned to Eric's older brother Archie (Larry Lamb) for comfort because he was there for Peggy when Eric began to abuse her. She tried to save her marriage by having another child in 1975 – her only daughter Samantha (Danniella Westbrook; Kim Medcalf). Her relationship with Eric improved, but only temporarily, and when Kevin Masters (Colin McCormack) employed Peggy to work at his minicab firm, they ended up having a secret affair. When Eric developed prostate cancer, Peggy gave up work to care for him until he eventually died in 1985. Following Eric's death, Kevin acquainted himself with Peggy once more and her children grew to harbour resentment towards him.

=== 1991 ===
Peggy makes her first appearance in Albert Square when her son, Grant, decides to reenlist with the army and returns when her daughter Sam's desire to escape from her family causes her to elope with Ricky Butcher (Sid Owen), at the age of sixteen. Peggy, along with Kevin, tries to persuade Sam that getting married at the age of sixteen will ruin her life, but she is unsuccessful. Peggy later accepts Sam and Ricky's relationship and leaves, after giving the couple her blessing.

=== 1994–2010 ===
Peggy is not seen for three years, during which time her relationship with Kevin ends. She returns to Walford when her sons fall out after Phil's affair with Grant's wife, Sharon Mitchell (Letitia Dean), is revealed. Peggy becomes acting landlady of The Queen Victoria public house and blames Sharon for the affair. Peggy tries to force her out of Walford, resulting in Sharon signing over her share of the pub and leaving the Mitchell family as the sole owners, with Peggy in charge.

Peggy starts dating businessman George Palmer (Paul Moriarty), unaware that he is a gangster involved in illegal money laundering. She also instigates a hate campaign against local resident Mark Fowler (Todd Carty) when she discovers he is HIV positive, and in doing so clashes with his mother Pauline (Wendy Richard) on several occasions. Peggy later realises she was wrong when she is diagnosed with breast cancer. She initially refuses surgery and ends things with George, fearing that he will not be able to handle her illness. However, supported by George and her family, she eventually has a lumpectomy. Peggy and George get engaged but their relationship ends when Phil reveals his illicit activities. Peggy goes on to date local car lot owner, Frank Butcher (Mike Reid), and they become engaged. Peggy has doubts about the wedding when her cancer returns and she has to have a mastectomy, but eventually decides to go through with it. Tension soon develops between Peggy and Phil when Grant leaves for Rio de Janeiro after a violent fight with his brother. To spite Peggy, Phil sells Grant's share in the pub to his business partner Dan Sullivan (Craig Fairbrass) for £5. The result of this causes Peggy to loathe Dan, and the two frequently argue over the running of The Queen Vic. At one point, Frank gets involved and punches Dan after the latter insults Frank's daughter Janine (Charlie Brooks). Eventually, she and Phil call a truce and force Dan out of Walford. Peggy discovers Frank is planning to leave her for his ex-wife, Pat Evans (Pam St Clement), so she shames them by reading Frank's Dear Jane letter to the entire pub and then slaps them both. She throws Frank out and he leaves Walford. Afterwards, Peggy becomes depressed and begins to rely heavily on tranquilisers. When Janine taunts her on Christmas Day about her father moving on, Peggy begins drinking heavily and smashes up the pub with a baseball bat. The next year, Peggy is forced to sell the pub as Frank left her in debt and is furious to discover that Sharon is the new owner.

By 2001, Peggy has begun dating Harry Slater (Michael Elphick); he is a relative of the newly arrived Slater Family as well as being a womaniser who owns a bar in Spain. He soon convinces her to move there with him and they become engaged, but their romance abruptly ends when Peggy learns that Harry has sexually abused his niece Kat (Jessie Wallace) when she was 13; not only that, but Harry got Kat pregnant and is therefore the illegitimate father of her teenage daughter Zoe (Michelle Ryan), initially believed to be Kat's youngest sister. When Phil begins dating Sharon again and becomes joint owner of The Queen Vic, Peggy moves back in. She later becomes sole licensee again when Sharon sells her half of the pub back to her. Peggy is briefly reunited with Frank when she travels to Spain to attend his funeral. She discovers he faked his own death to avoid creditors. While she's in Spain, she shockingly finds Sam working as a lap dancer and takes her home. Peggy later decides to move to Brazil to be with Grant but visits Walford for Sam's wedding to Andy Hunter (Michael Higgs) before returning to Brazil.

When Peggy returns to Walford in 2005, she is furious to discover Sam has lost possession of The Queen Vic – with the new licensee now being Sharon's stepmother Chrissie (Tracy-Ann Oberman). Later on, Peggy learns from Sam that she is framed by Chrissie for the murder of the latter's late husband Den Watts (Leslie Grantham). While trying to exonerate Sam and reclaim ownership of the pub, Peggy is surprised to learn that Johnny is now the square's new gangland kingpin and the two establish a feud when he also wishes to buy The Queen Vic. Johnny hires a mobster to assault Peggy, but she is saved by her sons Phil and Grant at the last minute. They are able to deal with Johnny, secure Sam's release from prison, and return Peggy to The Queen Vic.

In 2006 Peggy starts dating Jack Edwards (Nicky Henson), the father-in-law of Peggy's nephew Billy (Perry Fenwick). However, when Peggy discovers Billy's newborn daughter Janet (Grace) has Down syndrome, she declares that the baby should be put up for adoption – causing friction in her relationship with Edwards as a result. Although Peggy eventually comes to accept the baby, Edwards breaks up with her and leaves Walford for good.

Just a few years later, Peggy finds herself reacquainted with Archie no sooner after his two daughters Ronnie (Samantha Womack) and Roxy (Rita Simons) arrive to live with her at the pub. She forms a relationship with him and the pair get engaged, although Archie quickly begins subtly controlling Peggy. They nonetheless get married, but it ends a few hours later when it is publicly transpires that Archie lied to Ronnie about her infant daughter's death. Peggy has Archie evicted from The Queen Vic and attempts to have Phil kill him in revenge, but she is left furious when Phil doesn't go through with it in the end. Peggy files for divorce and Archie plots revenge on the entire Mitchell family. When Peggy loses the bail surety she has paid on behalf of her daughter Sam, who breaks the conditions of her bail following coercion from Archie, the Mitchells are forced to use The Queen Vic to gain a collateral loan from Phil's sworn arch-rival and estranged stepson Ian Beale (Adam Woodyatt) in order to surmount their debts. Archie thereafter uses Janine to blackmail Ian into selling him the loan, and when the Mitchells are unable to meet the loan repayment, Archie evicts them and assumes ownership of the pub. However, Archie is murdered on Christmas Day 2009 by an unknown assailant (see Who Killed Archie?). Peggy grieves for Archie, but she and various other members of her family become suspects for his murder. Following a police enquiry, local resident Bradley Branning (Charlie Clements) is posthumously found guilty of the murder, though unbeknownst to everyone, the actual murderer is Bradley's wife Stacey Branning (Lacey Turner) after Archie raped her months ago. In his will, Archie leaves The Queen Vic to Roxy, who reinstates Peggy.

After being disgusted with the state of the Square and learning that a councillor has stood down, Peggy and Pat both decide to run for council and are interviewed by journalist Harvey Freeman (Martin Jarvis). Eventually they both pull out of the election, but Harvey hears of this and individually invites them both out. They both finally discover his two-timing, and humiliate him as punishment. When Phil prevents his daughter Louise (Brittany Papple) from contacting her mother Lisa Fowler (Lucy Benjamin) and shouts at her, Peggy interjects and Phil slaps her. Believing that her son is an unfit parent and fearing for Louise's safety, Peggy takes Louise to Lisa against Phil's wishes. Although Lisa promises to allow Phil visitation, she flees with Louise just as the Mitchells learn about this too late. Phil blames Peggy for the loss of his child and begins relapsing his alcoholism as well as developing a crack cocaine addiction. Peggy tries to stop Phil using crack by locking him in her pub, but Phil escapes and in a drunken bid for revenge, he sets fire to the pub (see Queen Vic Fire Week). Peggy watches in horror as it is destroyed. Realizing her role in Phil's problems, Peggy decides to leave Walford for his sake. After saying tearful goodbyes to her family and making peace with Phil in a heartfelt conversation beteeen them, Peggy takes one last look at The Queen Vic and leaves Albert Square (which included her own version of the EastEnders theme tune, known as "Peggy's Theme").

=== 2013–2016 ===
In January 2012, Peggy misses Pat's funeral as she is on a cruise, and in 2013, Phil visits Peggy in Cornwall with Ben's baby daughter, Lexi Pearce (Dotti-Beau Cotterill). Three months later, Peggy flies into London to visit Phil in hospital, and encourages him to get rid of Carl White (Daniel Coonan) – an ex-conman who seeks to take over the Mitchell business empire. Afterwards, she visits Pat's old house and leaves a bottle of gin on the doorstep as a way of saying goodbye. In September 2014, Peggy appears in Portugal, telling Ronnie to go back to Walford and stop Phil from marrying Sharon. In February 2015, Peggy returns to Albert Square to confront her old friend Dot Branning (June Brown), after Dot's notoriously villainous son Nick Cotton (John Altman) cut the brakes on a car and falsely incriminated Phil. She learns from Dot that Nick has died, and comforts her and invites her to move in with her and Grant in Portugal. Peggy is also in on the secret that Ben's mother and Phil's ex-wife, Kathy Sullivan (Gillian Taylforth), had faked her own death nine years ago and wants to return to Walford. Before returning to Portugal, Peggy visits The Queen Vic and meets its new landlord, Mick Carter (Danny Dyer), who tells her to "get out of my pub" – which Peggy was known for saying as landlady.

In January 2016, Phil calls Peggy's older sister Sal (Anna Karen) and wants to know Louise's (now played by Tilly Keeper) address. When he soon goes to visit at her house, Peggy is there, having returned a week earlier. Peggy is disgusted to see that Phil has returned to alcoholism, but does give him Louise's address. She then reveals her breast cancer has returned, and she is dying. Phil tries to admit that he has cirrhosis of the liver, but she refuses to see him again and he leaves. In May, Peggy turns up on Ronnie's doorstep, and the next day Sal arrives with the news that Peggy's chemotherapy is not working and she is dying. A hospital appointment confirms that Peggy's cancer has spread to her brain and it is terminal. Peggy finally faces Phil, who is in recovery from his alcoholism, and admits she is dying. He is upset that she is refusing any more treatment, and takes her on a boat trip on the Thames, and back to their childhood home, to try to make her fight. However, Peggy is not convinced and asks Phil to help her die.

Sharon calls Grant back to Walford, and he persuades Phil not to help Peggy. She tells them both she will not kill herself. After talking with Dot and settling old feuds with Sharon and Stacey, and having one last drink at the Queen Vic, Peggy begins hallucinating the smell of cigarette smoke; this eventually manifests into a vision of Pat. As the two reminisce about past memories, Peggy states she still wants to die now before the cancer gets worse and to be remembered as a strong woman. Upon being reassured by Pat that she will not leave her side, Peggy then commits suicide by taking an overdose of her pills. Phil is devastated to find her body, and a letter from her urges him to love himself as others love him. Peggy's funeral takes place on 4 July 2016. Phil is due to give a eulogy, but gets too emotional and rushes home. Sharon later calms him down by revealing that Peggy was the one who had Eric sent to prison when Phil was a child, not corrupt police officers as he was previously told, and that she did it to protect him. Phil later works up the courage to finish his eulogy to Peggy at the wake, and then returns to her grave at the church to finish his goodbyes to her, unaware that Grant has secretly left a rose at the grave.

== Reception ==
Peggy has been described by the BBC as one of EastEnders' "most high-profile characters." Windsor has won several awards for her performance as Peggy. In 1999, she was named BBC Personality of the Year. She won Best Actress at the 1999 British Soap Awards, and was granted a Lifetime Achievement award in 2009. She also won a Lifetime Achievement award at the 2001 Inside Soap awards, and was named the UK's top soap matriarch in a 2009 Inside Soap poll. She also won the Soap Legend award at the 2009 TV Now Awards. Furthermore, Windsor was nominated for the Outstanding Serial Drama Performance award at the 2008 and 2009 National Television Awards, Best Soap Actress at the 2007 TV Now Awards, Best Actress at the 2009 British Soap Awards, and Best Actress at the 2009 Inside Soap awards.

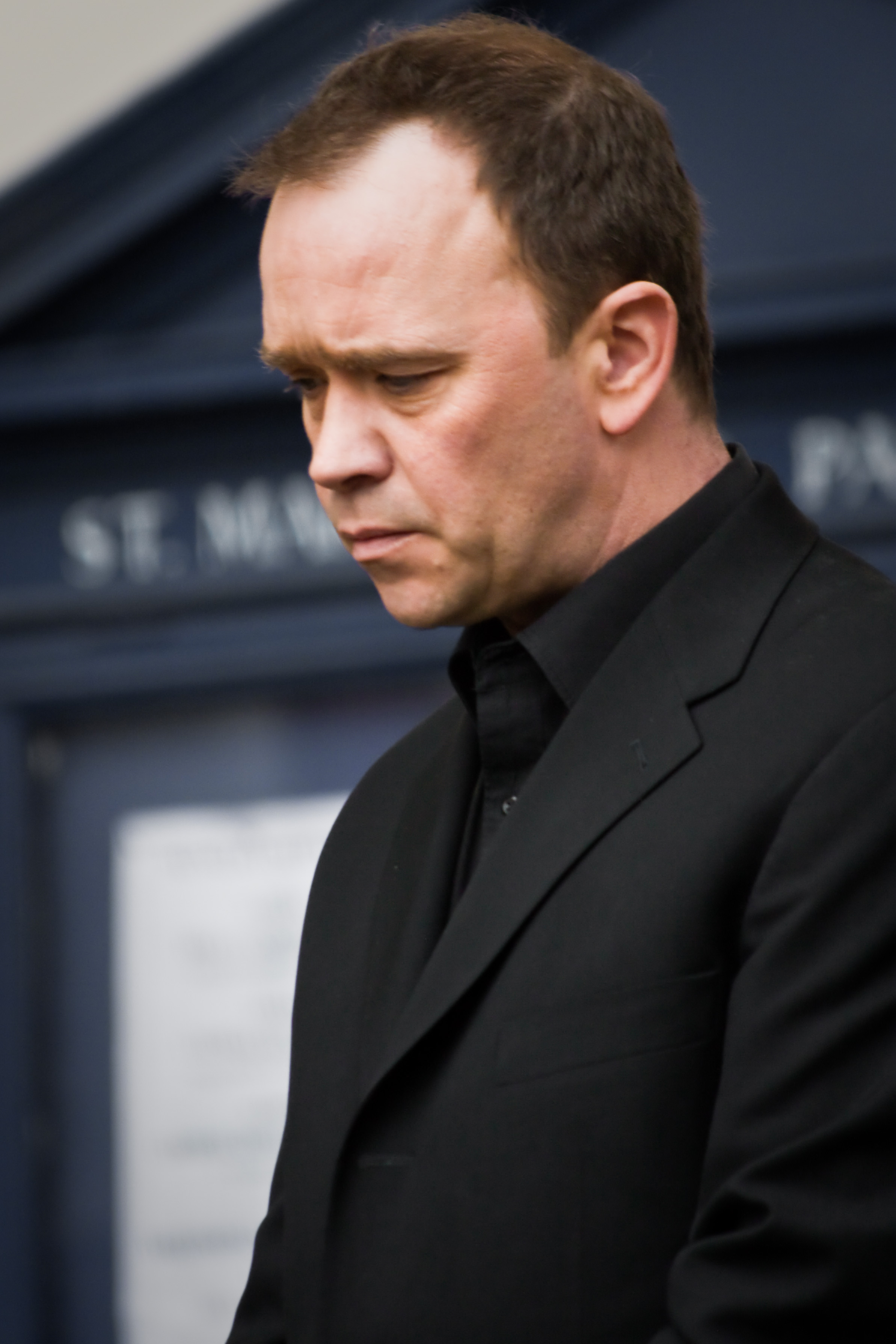
Windsor was opposed to the storyline which saw Peggy mount a hate campaign against Mark Fowler (Todd Carty) for being HIV positive.

The character was viewed unfavourably by a proportion of viewers in 1996, when Peggy discovered that Mark Fowler (Todd Carty) was HIV positive and subsequently mounted a hate campaign against him. Windsor has since revealed that she was initially opposed to the storyline:

[Peggy] was vicious to [Mark]. She was so naïve about the whole thing. When I got the script and it said some awful things, I couldn't believe it. It's the only time I've questioned the writers and said 'I can't believe it, people aren't like that today'. Then they sent me a survey and proved that people are actually like that. When it came to doing the scenes, I just got hold of Todd [Carty] and said, 'sorry this is Peggy!' I got the most appalling [hate] mail because of it. I had a very dear friend of mine who was dying of AIDS so it was very personal to me. The last scene I did I went straight out and got terribly drunk.

Actress and writer Jacquetta May, who played the character Rachel Kominski between 1991 and 1993, has discussed the storyline and the role of women in an article about EastEnders. According to May, the scriptwriters were faced with a problem once Peggy, "a key figure of the community", was shown to exhibit such "pig-headed ignorance and appalling prejudice". In order for Peggy to be redeemed, she had to be seen to be punished, and so the character was given breast-cancer later that year. May comments, "Peggy, malicious gossip and bigot, herself becomes the victim of a life-threatening illness. At Christmas they run a Christian forgiveness story. Peggy calls on Mark and tells him she now knows what it is like to suffer as he has. She apologises, thus underlining one of the basic tenets of the programme: underneath the skin we are all the same, human and vulnerable, and recognition of this should unite us not divide us. Along the way, a great deal of useful information about these illnesses was broadcast. So, although EastEnders endlessly repeats its conservative format, and although all issues are there primarily to feed the great hungry story-beast, its positive by-products cannot be denied."

EastEnders has received praise for the handling of Peggy's breast cancer storyline, as she was a rare media portrayal of an older matriarchal woman with the disease. Older women are at higher risk of being diagnosed; however, in 2001, it was reported that media representation of breast cancer is skewed towards younger women in their 20s or 30s, as they are seen as "more tragic" or "more sexy" in media terms. A 2000 study by Kitzinger and Henderson showed that 94% of newspaper coverage on non-celebrity women with breast cancer was on those aged under 50. Source organisations working with EastEnders on the storyline have commented: "[The team] decided it was going to be [Peggy] and very rightly so. Bang on, the right age [...] perfect dramatic licence in terms of her sons that she was going to have to share this terrible news with, and how would she share it? Every female would have that problem. How would you tell your children? And they followed that with her. She was exactly the right person." The storyline also received media criticism, for the use of a breast care nurse, who was used to counsel Peggy and translate medical terminology into lay terms for viewers; a character who could provide both a dramatic and educational purpose. However, not all oncology units in the UK offer breast care nurses, and the character presented "particularly positive messages" concerning patient choice and control over treatment options. Because of this, the UK press dubbed the storyline "didactic". The storyline was also criticised because Peggy received her cancer test results after six days, which prompted cancer charities to warn that not all patients would receive the same treatment.

In December 2008, Bupa doctors criticised UK soaps for presenting unhealthy role models to viewing audiences. Paul Bignell and Cole Moreton for The Independent refuted the accusation, naming Peggy as an acceptable role model for her devotion to her family, protecting her nieces and loving her sons despite their numerous misdemeanours. Peggy Mitchell's (Barbara Windsor) 2010 departure was watched over 11 million viewers. A reporter writing for the Inside Soap Yearbook described Peggy's death as "heartbreaking". In 2 In a 2021 Radio Times poll, Peggy was voted as the second best "soap pub landlord", receiving 13% of the votes.

== In popular culture ==
Peggy Mitchell, spoofed in 2DTV.

Peggy has been spoofed in several programmes, including the ITV cartoon sketch show 2DTV, and Harry Hill's TV Burp. In the BBC's Big Impression, impressionist Ronni Ancona performs as Peggy, shuffling around on her knees to exaggerate Barbara Windsor's petite height, and regularly using the catchphrase "Get outta my pub!" Impressionist Jan Ravens has spoofed her in the BBC's Dead Ringers, also mimicking her cheeky laugh. Commenting on Ancona's impersonation, Windsor has said: "she does me brilliantly. I told her it was a great compliment. She made me realise my little hands wave around a lot."

In November 2005, Peggy appeared in a sketch for Children in Need, which was a crossover between EastEnders and The Catherine Tate Show. The sketch featured Peggy, Little Mo Mitchell (Kacey Ainsworth), Stacey Slater (Lacey Turner) and Catherine Tate as her character Lauren Cooper. The 2006 episode of Doctor Who titled "Army of Ghosts" features a fictional EastEnders scene in which Peggy tells the ghost of Den Watts to "get outta my pub!"

== See also ==
- "Who Killed Archie?"
- "Queen Vic Fire Week"
