= Mark Timlin =

British author (1944–2026)

Sharman series
- Author: Mark Timlin
- Country: United Kingdom
- Language: English
- Genre: Crime fiction
- Publisher: Headline, Gollancz, No Exit Press, others
- Published: 1988–
- Media type: Print (paperback)

Mark Timlin (15 June 1944 in Cheltenham – 18 November 2026) was a British author best known for his series of novels featuring Nick Sharman, a former Metropolitan Police officer who takes up the profession of private investigator in South London. The Sharman books are characterised by their noir tone and their fast action, and feature a high casualty rate among their characters; Sharman himself is frequently injured or even hospitalised in the course of the novels. The books formed the basis for the TV series Sharman, in which Clive Owen played the eponymous detective; Timlin made a cameo appearance in the pilot episode.

Before commencing his writing career, Timlin worked in a variety of jobs such as being a roadie for rock groups including T Rex and The Who, running a Clapham Junction music venue, minicab driver, and proprietor of a skateboard company. In 1985 he was unemployed and living in a friend's abandoned bus. Turning to writing as a way out of living on benefits, he wrote his first novel, A Good Year for the Roses, which was published as a paperback original in 1988. The Sharman series is now in double figures; in early years, Timlin published prolifically. Almost all of the Sharman books carry titles which are taken from songs.

He has cited influences on his work as including Ed McBain, Raymond Chandler, Ross Macdonald, Richard Stark and John D. MacDonald.

Both the violent nature of the Sharman novels, and remarks made by Timlin himself, have made the author a figure of controversy. He resigned from the Crime Writers' Association, saying he "would rather stick needles in my eyes" than ever rejoin, and was scornful of comments made by P. D. James, who argued that cosy mysteries presented opportunities to depict moral choices which hardboiled style novels lacked; Timlin claimed "I write about the reality I see on the streets of south London" and insisted that Sharman "has his own morals". Other writers such as Val McDermid were also critical of James' opinions.

Timlin lived in London's Docklands. For many years he reviewed crime fiction for the Independent on Sunday newspaper.

== List of Sharman books ==
A Good Year for the Roses, 1988 – Sharman is hired to investigate a missing teenage girl.

Romeo's Tune, 1990 – Sharman tangles with a shady music firm in pursuit of a reclusive ex-rock-star's missing royalties.

Gun Street Girl, 1990 – Sharman spots a wealthy young woman shoplifting and becomes drawn into sordid drama involving her rich family.

Take the A-Train, 1991 – Sharman finds himself caught in a turf war between two crime families.

The Turnaround, 1992 – Who massacred a carpet dealer's entire family? The police have given up on solving the case, but Sharman finds some stones have been left unturned.

Hearts of Stone, 1992 – Sharman is coerced into assisting the drugs squad with investigating criminals who have already killed two police officers.

Zip Gun Boogie, 1992 – Sharman is hired as protection by a rock band whose members have a long tradition of dying prematurely. (The fictional band, Pandora's Box, has some similarities to Fleetwood Mac.)

Falls the Shadow, 1993 – Sharman investigates shady goings-on at a radio station.

Ashes by Now, 1993 – As a new constable, Sharman connived at the unfair conviction of a man for rape. Now the prisoner is out of gaol, and turns to Sharman to clear his name.

Pretend We're Dead, 1994 – Sharman discovers that a famous musician of the 1960s, thought to have died young, may still be alive. (The fictional band Dog Soldier and its singer Jay Harrison bear some similarities to The Doors and Jim Morrison.)

Paint It Black, 1995 – Sharman is married and looking forward to a quiet life at last, but fate has other plans for him. (This was intended to be the final Sharman novel, with Sharman dying at the end.)

Find My Way Home, 1996 – Pieces of a dismembered corpse begin to turn up around south London. Sharman is an old acquaintance of the dead man.

A Street That Rhymed At 3 AM, 1997 – Sharman’s Christmas is interrupted by the news that his ex-wife and her new family are dead following a terrorist bomb explosion.

Dead Flowers, 1998 – Sharman is hired by a lottery winner and finds several dubious characters are very interested in his newly acquired riches.

Quick Before They Catch Us, 1999 – Venturing away from his home turf, Sharman finds himself embroiled in a violent family feud in Manchester.

All the Empty Places, 2000 – Sharman becomes entangled in a plan to rob a City bank.

Stay Another Day, 2010 – Sharman abandons his Caribbean retirement when his daughter, now a police officer, needs his help.

Sharman and Other Filth (short stories), 1996 – Contains several Sharman stories (one of which was originally written as a plot treatment for The Bill), plus one non-Sharman novella.

== List of other works ==
Under his own name:

I Spied a Pale Horse, 1999 – Science fiction. A plague destroys civilisation in the UK and the anti-hero, a police officer, fights for survival.

Answers from the Grave, 2004, rewritten as Guns Of Brixton, 2010 – A non-Sharman thriller, though Sharman appears in a cameo role.

101 Best TV Crime Series, 2010 – Non-fiction.

As by Johnny Angelo:

Groupies, 1993

Groupies 2, 1994

Champagne Sister, 1995 (Features a character from the Sharman novel Zip Gun Boogie)

As by Jim Ballantyne:

The Torturer, 1995

As by Holly Delatour (erotica):

The Downfall of Danielle, 1993

What Katy Dunn Did, 1994

As by Lee Martin:

Gangster's Wives, 2007

The Lipstick Killers, 2009

As by Martin Milk (anagram of 'Mark Timlin'):

That Saturday, 1996

As by Tony Williams:

Valin's Raiders, 1994

Blue on Blue, 1999
