= Frankie Pierre =

Fictional character from EastEnders

- EastEnders character
- Portrayed by: Syan Blake
- Duration: 1996–1997
- First appearance: Episode 1306; 24 June 1996
- Last appearance: Episode 1427; 25 March 1997
- Introduced by: Jane Harris
In-universe information
- Occupation: Singer

Frankie Pierre is a fictional character from the BBC soap opera EastEnders. She appears between 24 June 1996 and 25 March 1997, played by Syan Blake. Portrayed as a "super-bitch" and home wrecker, Frankie attempts to ruin the established relationships of several characters during her nine months on the soap, purposefully seducing attached men.

== Character creation ==
Soul singer Frankie Pierre was introduced in 1996 by the Series Producer of EastEnders, Jane Harris. A previously unknown actress, Syan Blake, was cast in the role. She was initially signed on a 6 months contract, but subsequently had her contract extended.

Blake had auditioned for the minor role of a nurse who treated Kathy Mitchell's (Gillian Taylforth) baby Ben Mitchell (Matthew Silver), after he was involved in a meningitis scare. However, the casting directors saw potential and asked Blake to audition for a far bigger upcoming role as a regular character, Frankie Pierre. Blake said, "I went for the audition and dressed quite sexily. I was a bit confused when they told me there was another regular part going for a soul singer and asked me if I could sing." Even though she confessed that she could not sing very well, they asked her to perform nonetheless and she sang one of her favourite songs, "Harlem On My Mind". Blake was told the following day that her audition had been successful. When asked about her reaction to the news, Blake said, "I put the phone down afterwards and sat on the sofa feeling numb, it just didn't sink in... I just felt stunned. I'd always watched EastEnders but seeing all these famous people in real life and walking onto the set was the most frightening thing I'd ever done. People were really friendly, but I just sat there dreading my first scene in which I had to sing a song in the pub with all those famous faces watching me."

== Development ==
Frankie's arrival in June 1996 was part of a storyline that broke up the marriage of the characters Alan and Carol Jackson (Howard Antony and Lindsey Coulson). After meeting Alan at a gig with her band, Frankie made it her mission to snare him. According to The Sunday Mirror, millions of viewers tuned in to watch "home-wrecker Frankie get her claws into happily married Alan Jackson." However, after Alan had fallen "under her spell" and left his wife and children, Frankie lost interest, dumped him and moved on to her next victim, Tony Hills (Mark Homer), who was described as her "ultimate conquest", as Tony was not only in a relationship, but also gay.

Frankie was described as a predatory man-eater, a trouble maker, an unhinged sexpot, and a super-bitch who "seduces men away from their loved ones...then dumps them with a sneer." The official EastEnders book Who’s Who states that Frankie "had a carnivorous approach to relationships, hunting down her quarry, devouring her victim in two gulps and then moving onto the next kill." In an article published in The Sunday Mirror in 1997, sex therapist, Anne Hopper, discussed the character of Frankie and the reasons why women like her enjoy luring men away from their partners, and then discard them once they succeed: "women like [...] Frankie have usually been hurt in early childhood or previous relationships. They are low on self-esteem. An affair can make them feel wanted - but keeps the relationship at arm's length." Later confirmed on-screen, Frankie's promiscuous, immoral and devious behaviour was blamed on her deprived childhood, a history of being hurt, lack of trust and insecurities.

Frankie eventually departed the soap in March 1997 amidst a failed attempt at seducing a religious evangelist, Alistair Matthews, who had been trying to make her change her promiscuous lifestyle. Off-screen it was reported that Blake and the producers of EastEnders had decided to write the character out of the serial, as the actress was receiving death threats from angry fans that could not separate fact from fiction, and blamed Blake for her character's home-wrecking.

== Storylines ==
Frankie first appears in June 1996 as a soul singer in a band with musician Mick McFarlane (Sylvester Williams), who is her former boyfriend. Frankie's band is hired to play at the Bridge Street Night Café, and Frankie is immediately attracted to café worker Alan Jackson (Howard Antony). She openly flirts with him, unconcerned that he is already married to Carol (Lindsey Coulson). Frankie is intent on snaring Alan. She moves to Albert Square — sharing a house with Huw Edwards and Lenny Wallace (Richard Elis and Des Coleman) — and gets a job as a waitress at the café, so she can be near Alan. She tries to persuade him that married life is making him unhappy, encouraging him to split from his wife to be with her. Alan resists her advances, so Frankie changes tactics. She targets Alan's wife Carol, infuriating her with suggestive claims about the nature of her relationship with Alan. Carol is extremely jealous and many arguments erupt between her and Alan, which causes a rift in their relationship. When Alan confronts Frankie about her stirring, she breaks down claiming that she loves him, but it is all just a game to coax him away from Carol. Alan falls for Frankie's lies, and after one row too many with his jealous wife, he has sex with Frankie, beginning an affair. Frankie is keen for Carol to find out so she plants her watch in Alan's house, hoping that Carol will find it. When Alan discovers Frankie's gameplaying, he attempts to end their relationship, but she threatens to inform Carol about their affair unless he keeps on seeing her. Carol, realising her husband is cheating on her, tires of the deception. She turns to her former boyfriend David Wicks (Michael French) and they begin a short-lived affair. The truth finally comes out, both Alan and Carol confess to their affairs, but neither can forgive, and when Frankie invites Alan to live with her, he accepts, devastating his family.

However, Frankie's feelings towards Alan change as soon as he moves in with her. She ends the relationship days after he leaves his wife and family, claiming that the relationship has grown too intense. Stunned, Alan tries to change her mind, but Frankie has lost interest. It emerges that Frankie has a history of chasing attached men only to lose interest as soon as she has succeeded in breaking up their marriage. Her friend, Mick, claims that her deprived childhood and an inability to be loved are the cause of her promiscuous and devious behaviour.

Alan is sympathetic and willing to help Frankie through her psychological problems, but she has already set her sights on a new man, Tony Hills (Mark Homer). Even though Tony is in a homosexual relationship with another man, Frankie seduces him, and after copious amounts of alcohol, they have sex together. Tony is desperate to keep their tryst a secret from his boyfriend, Simon (Andrew Lynford). He tells Frankie that their night together was a mistake, however, Frankie will not accept rejection; she attempts to blackmail him into continuing their affair, threatening to out him as a homosexual, and tell his boyfriend what has occurred. Tony fears the repercussions, but he refuses to give Frankie what she wants, and she has further knockbacks from Sanjay Kapoor (Deepak Verma) and her neighbour Ian Beale (Adam Woodyatt), who throws her out of his house after she propositions him, branding her a "scrubber" with "no class". Feeling sorry for herself, Frankie seeks salvation from evangelist Alistair Matthews (Neil Clark). She starts off by singing at one of his prayer groups, and Alistair takes a keen interest in her spiritual welfare. Frankie takes this the wrong way, assuming that Alistair is interested in her sexually. She tries to seduce him on numerous occasions, but Alistair rejects her each time. This bruises Frankie's ego, and she starts spreading rumours that they had had sex together in an attempt to make Alan jealous. Alistair fears that his reputation is being tarnished. He confronts Frankie in The Queen Victoria public house, exposing her lies and humiliating her in front of everyone. Frankie turns to Alan for support, but he shuns her, finally realising what a liar she is. Incensed, Frankie turns violent and attempts to assault Alan, until her friend Mick shows up and drags her away. Frankie moves away from Walford and Mick later mentions that she has quit their band.

== Reception ==
Blake said that the role of a homewrecker was tough to play, and she was startled by the depth of public feeling towards her character. She admitted that she received hate mail and death threats from scorned female viewers who hated the role that she played. She commented, "one woman wrote to me telling me that her marriage had almost been ruined when someone like Frankie went after her husband. It was a really vicious letter; she threatened to kill me and warned me to watch out. It was very frightening. She started the letter; `Dear Syan, stay away from Alan,' which worried me because she was obviously deluded and thought that I really am Frankie. Another woman stopped me in the street and told me she wanted to kick me. She was only joking – but I realised people really don't like Frankie. I suppose people hate her because she's such a threat, and she's so sexually confident."

Despite the negative reaction from female viewers, Blake claimed that her character was much more popular with men. She commented, "A lot of men write and just ask for my photograph, but some have sent pictures of themselves and asked me out. I've also had poetry sent, which is really sweet."

Actor Howard Antony, who played the popular character Alan Jackson between 1993 and 1997, said in 1997 that he was unhappy with the elements of his character's affair with Frankie. He said this contributed to his decision to quit the soap in 1997. He said that the "final straw" came when his character refused to get back together with screen wife Carol, and instead continued his affair with Frankie, knowing that he was just her plaything: "There are those above me who make decisions for my character and they're not always ones I like. There were certain aspects of the Frankie story I didn't like. I was frustrated with Alan taking so much nonsense. I thought 'Why are you investing time in Frankie when the woman you've been with for nine years wants you back?' As an actor it was a difficult pill to swallow."
