= Polly Becker =

Fictional character from the BBC soap opera EastEnders

- EastEnders character
- Portrayed by: Victoria Gould
- Duration: 1997–1998
- First appearance: Episode 1427; 25 March 1997
- Last appearance: Episode 1672; 22 September 1998
- Introduced by: Jane Harris
In-universe information
- Occupation: Journalist

Polly Becker is a fictional character from the BBC soap opera EastEnders, played by Victoria Gould from 25 March 1997 until 22 September 1998.

== Creation and development ==
Actress Victoria Gould has revealed that she won her role in EastEnders after a producer saw her performing in Hamlet and she was asked to audition for the role of Polly. Gould has commented, "I was catapulted into the weird world of soap land and infamy. People really believe that those soaps are real and people actually believed that I was Polly from EastEnders". Journalist Polly has been described by author Kate Lock as a "hard-bitten, cynical, ambitious" and someone who "never allowed sentiment to get in the way of a good story."

Polly is embroiled in a love triangle storyline with bi-sexual Tony Hills (Mark Homer) and gay Simon Raymond (Andrew Lynford). Tony cheats on Simon with Polly Becker and according to the BBC, "the way the show portrayed Tony coming to terms with his bisexuality was widely praised". Gould quit the role in 1998. She was one of many actors to either quit or be axed by executive producer Matthew Robinson that year.

== Storylines ==
Polly, a journalist, turns up in Albert Square in March 1997 to report the local happenings for the Walford Gazette. She begins a friendship with Tony Hills (Mark Homer) and he gets a job at the Gazette as a trainee journalist, shadowing Polly. They investigate George and Annie Palmer (Paul Moriarty and Nadia Sawalha), suspecting corruption (money laundering) and discover George is in league with Councillor Dixon (John Gillett). Unbeknownst to Polly, Annie is also blackmailing the Gazette's owner, Max Townsend (Alan Hunter). They uncover that the Councillor is cheating on his wife with a young man named Jamie, and this is eventually uncovered to the press, but not by Polly, by the Councillor's scorned wife. Dixon hangs himself shortly after.

Tony and Polly have sex one night in 1997; however, Polly is unaware that Tony is in a homosexual relationship with Simon Raymond (Andrew Lynford). Despite initial hurt, Polly and Tony remain friends. Polly forms a friendship with Ruth Fowler (Caroline Paterson), but later betrays Ruth's confidence by extracting information from her about her friends, the Kapoors. Polly writes a story that is published in a national newspaper, to further her career, revealing that Sanjay Kapoor (Deepak Verma) is not the biological father of his wife Gita (Shobu Kapoor)'s new baby, causing upset. After being confronted by the residents of Albert Square and getting a new job, Polly departs in September 1998, unapologetic.

== Reception ==
The characterisation of Polly as a "hack" has been described as clichéd.Rob Younge of The Independent used Polly as an example of a negative television portrayal of a journalist, that does not help to diminish "the mythologies that surround journalism." In reference to Polly reporting on the Kapoors scandal in 1998, Ashley Davies of The Independent claimed that anyone who "watched the Polly-the-reporter-goes-bonkers-and-stitches- up-her-mates episode on EastEnders sitting next to a journalist will have experienced similar responses to those poor folk who've seen a war movie with someone who has been in the army. Their viewing would have been punctuated by yells of: 'That would never happen!' and 'Fools. It doesn't work like that!' [...] Journalists are always getting upset at the way they are portrayed in television dramas. The Polly palaver on EastEnders would never have happened in real life because, although hacks occasionally do shaft their friends, Gita and Sanjay's lack of celebrity would render details of their love life irrelevant". Jon Slattery, editor of Press Gazette, the trade magazine for journalists, commented, "On TV you see journalists knifing up their friends and being able to publish anything without fear of libel. And they always make it look like a solo operation, with the reporter running around the country getting great stories. In reality journalists are more likely to be chained to their desks."

== See also ==
- List of fictional journalists
