= Tony Hills =

Fictional character from the BBC soap opera EastEnders

- EastEnders character
- Portrayed by: Mark Homer
- Duration: 1995–1999
- First appearance: Episode 1181; 7 September 1995
- Last appearance: Episode 1764; 15 April 1999
In-universe information
- Occupation: Trainee journalist
- Father: Ted Hills
- Mother: Irene Raymond
- Stepfather: Terry Raymond
- Sisters: Sarah Hills
- Aunts: Kathy Beale
- First cousins: Ian Beale; Ben Mitchell; Donna Ludlow; Nina Harris

Tony Hills is a fictional character from the BBC soap opera EastEnders, played by Mark Homer from 7 September 1995 to 15 April 1999.

== Development ==
Mark Homer portrayed Tony and debuted in the role in 1995. Homer's departure from EastEnders was announced in late 1998, along with that of his co-star Andrew Lynford. They both decided to leave following discussions with the executive producer Matthew Robinson, and a spokesperson for the programme said "They have mutually agreed that both characters have fulfilled their potential and will conclude their stories with a dramatic exit." Their departures left only one gay character in the UK's mainstream soap operas, that of Zoe Tate in Emmerdale. Gay campaigning group Stonewall's spokesman Matt Aston commented on this, saying: "Gay characters did seem to be on the rise for a while, but now they've got a bit of a low profile. We'd like to see a few more positive role models in the media, especially to encourage young people who are coming to terms with their sexuality, as well as their friends and members of their family." However, Aston praised the way Tony's sexuality was handled, saying, "It was very good for breaking what had been a taboo on prime-time television. It was a positive portrayal of how people can be confused about their sexuality. And as with any kind of exposure of these issues, people are made more aware of them and the problems people have with their sexuality. People also link them with us and get in touch to talk about it." EastEnders's first gay kiss attracted criticism, but it was noted that by the time Tony and Simon had their first kiss, "fewer feathers were left to be ruffled."

== Storylines ==
Tony arrives in Walford from Norfolk on 7 September 1995 with his sister, Sarah Hills (Daniella Denby-Ashe). He is unsympathetic and sells ecstasy with a friend, Dan Zappieri (Carl Pizzie). Eventually, he quits dealing after Dan gives Sarah ecstasy without her knowledge. Tony begins a relationship with Tiffany Raymond (Martine McCutcheon) and lives with her for a while. She becomes pregnant and the baby is assumed to be Tony's. However, Tiffany catches him kissing her brother Simon Raymond (Andrew Lynford), with whom he then starts a relationship, and the baby is revealed to be Grant Mitchell's (Ross Kemp). Tony still believes the baby may be his until, after it is born, a paternity test confirms he is not the father.

Tony and Simon have a turbulent relationship, and Tony has affairs with Frankie Pierre (Syan Blake), a singer, and Polly Becker (Victoria Gould), a journalist at the Walford Gazette, where Tony is a trainee. Simon discovers the affairs and the couple split up. Tony's experiments with ecstasy and general pro-drug attitudes cause him to once say "no-one ever died from taking E". He has a relationship with Teresa di Marco (Leila Birch), but after Tiffany dies and Simon nearly burns to death in a house fire, Tony reconciles with Simon. Simon has trouble accepting that Tony is bisexual rather than gay, but Tony convinces Simon that he is the one he wants and they leave Albert Square together in April 1999 to travel around Europe. A letter sent to Tony's family reveals the couple has settled in Amsterdam.

== Reception ==
Author Margaret Llewellyn-Jones has suggested that Simon and Tony were two of the "straight-est-looking gay boys in London". She suggested that they were not convincing to the gay audience, which she argued was because "the gayness of the characters was 'clawed-back' and that the readers of the image who see them as unconvincing use a queer reading practice. The two gay characters are signified within codes of recognition that are available to the central reader. To the queer reader they can be seen clearly as a rather dubious construction – they are a carbon copy of a 'straight' relationship where only the object of desire is different, rather than a relationship that signs itself as different. To a queer reader the gay relationship in this instance says nothing to them other than a representation of a straight relationship, what it does show is the implicit constructedness of all of the relationships present in a soap's fabric."

== See also ==
- List of fictional journalists
- List of LGBT characters in television and radio
