= Sharman (TV series) =

- DVD cover
- Genre: Crime drama
- Written by: Tony Hoare; Guy Jenkin; Paul Abbott; Dusty Hughes; Mick Ford
- Directed by: Suri Krishnama; Matthew Evans; Bob Bierman
- Starring: Clive Owen; John Salthouse; Roberta Taylor
- Composer: Mike Moran
- Country of origin: United Kingdom
- Original language: English
- No. of series: 1
- No. of episodes: 5

Production
- Executive producer: Tony Garnett
- Producer: Bill Shapter
- Cinematography: Ashley Rowe; Kevin Rowley
- Editors: Ian Sutherland; Roger Wilson
- Running time: 90 minutes
- Production companies: World Productions; Carlton Television

Original release
- Network: ITV
- Release: 5 April 1995 – 25 November 1996

Sharman is a British television crime drama series, based on the Nick Sharman books by London-based author Mark Timlin, that first broadcast on 5 April 1995. Broadcast on ITV, the series stars Clive Owen in the title role of Sharman, a private detective operating out of a private office in South London. The series began in the form of a pilot, based on the novel The Turnaround, before being developed into four further feature-length stories, each based upon one of Timlin's novels; only the final episode, "Pretend We're Dead", differs from the plot of the original novel; aside from the final scene, the remainder of the plot is an original composition by writer Mick Ford.

Aside from Owen, the series featured two other regular cast members in the form of John Salthouse, who appears as Detective Inspector Jack Robber, a seedy but cunning police officer; and Roberta Taylor who appears as Aggie, Sharma's secretary. Guest cast featured in the series include the likes of Ray Winstone, Keith Allen, and Samantha Janus, who is also pictured on the series DVD cover, despite only appearing in a single episode.

The Turnaround was first released on VHS in 1995, before the entire series, was released on DVD via Network on 1 October 2012. Timlin's novels were also reprinted to feature images of Clive Owen on the cover.

== Cast ==
=== Regular Cast ===
- Clive Owen as Nick Sharman
- John Salthouse as Detective Inspector Jack Robber
- Roberta Taylor as Aggie

=== Supporting cast ===
==== The Turnaround ====
- Bill Paterson as James Webb
- Rowena King as Fiona
- Matthew Marsh as Tony Hogan

==== Take the A-Train ====
- Samantha Womack as Jane
- Clarence Smith as Cedric
- Gina Bellman as Kiki
- Patrick Baladi as George

==== Hearts of Stone ====
- Keith Allen as Brady
- Julie Graham as Kylie
- Steven Hartley as Paul O'Dowd
- Grant Masters as Joe Lancer

==== A Good Year for the Roses ====
- Marianne Jean-Baptiste as Precious
- Mark Moraghan as Dicks
- Cliff Parisi as Terry Southall
- Kelly Reilly as Sophie Bright
- Hugo Speer as Mayles
- Ray Winstone as George Bright

==== Pretend We're Dead ====
- Adie Allen as Dawn
- Anton Lesser as Galilee
- Colette Brown as Tracey
- Danny Webb as Durban

== Episodes ==
=== Pilot (1995) ===
No.	Title	Directed by	Written by	Original release date
1	"The Turnaround"	Suri Krishnamma	Tony Hoare	5 April 1995
Sharman is approached by a man who is desperate to find out who was responsible for the murder of his sister and her family.

=== Series 1 (1996) ===
No.	Title	Directed by	Written by	Original release date
2	"Take The A-Train"	Bob Bierman	Guy Jenkin	4 November 1996
Sharman is approached by a grieving widow and agrees to take on the case of a former colleague who is found murdered.
3	"Hearts of Stone"	Bob Bierman	Paul Abbott	11 November 1996
Sharman is angered when he is tricked by Drugs Squad officers into going undercover to infiltrate a dangerous South London gang.
4	"A Good Year For The Roses"	Matthew Evans	Dusty Hughes	18 November 1996
Sharman agrees to act as protector for a lesbian dance couple who are being threatened and harassed by their former manager.
5	"Pretend We're Dead"	Matthew Evans	Mick Ford	25 November 1996
Sharman is approached by a bank manager who wants to find out who is using his bank to launder counterfeit money.
