= List of fictional journalists =

Attributing the profession of journalist to a fictional character allows many possibilities for the author: reporters may travel extensively and face adventures (like Tintin), are among the first to have news of disasters and crimes (like Clark "Superman" Kent and Peter "Spider-Man" Parker), and are supposed to be good at establishing communication. Some journalist may also be recognized as heroes (like Ulala from Space Channel 5), and fix the mixed and negative reception of the profession from their respective fictional universe.

== By country ==
=== Australia ===
- Alex Burchill, reporter on Lowdown
- Martin "Marty" Di Stasio, senior reporter on the fictional TV current affairs show Frontline
- Libby Kennedy, from Australian soap opera Neighbours
- Susan Kennedy, from Australian soap opera Neighbours
- Mike Moore, anchor of Frontline
- Riley Parker, from Neighbours
- Scott Robinson from Neighbours
- Brooke Vandenberg, reporter on Frontline

=== Austria ===
- Brüno Gehard, fashion reporter featured in the mockumentary comedy film Brüno

=== Belgium ===
- Tintin, in Hergé's bande dessinée albums The Adventures of Tintin (French: Les Aventures de Tintin)
- Spirou and Fantasio, from the same comic series

=== Canada ===
- Louis Ciccone, from Seeing Things
- Caitlin Ryan, from the Degrassi series

=== Chile ===
- Tulio Triviño, from Chilean puppet TV show 31 minutos
- Juan Carlos Bodoque, Mario Hugo, Balon Von Bola, Mico Micofono, Juanin Juan Harry, Patana Tufillo from 31 minutos

=== China ===
- Alice DeRoss, from the Chinese video game Identity V

=== France ===
- Georges Duroy, Bel Ami's main character
- Ulysse Mérou, journalist from Planet of the Apes
- Raymond Rambert, journalist from The Plague
- Joseph Rouletabille, in Gaston Leroux's novels

=== Germany ===
- Karla Kolumna, reporter appearing in two German children series: Bibi Blocksberg and Benjamin the Elephant

=== Hong Kong ===
- Lily Wong from comic strips

=== Italy ===
- Paparazzo, from Federico Fellini's film La Dolce Vita, origin of the term paparazzi
- Marcello Rubini, from La Dolce Vita

=== Japan ===
- Ulala, a reporter for Channel 5, the protagonist of the Space Channel 5 video games (Note: Character themselves isn’t necessarily from Japan, but was created by Japanese writers, designers, producers, or developers)
- Pudding, a rival reporter for Channel 42 who enjoys the limelight and fame, from the Space Channel 5 video games (Note: Character themselves isn’t necessarily from Japan, but was created by Japanese writers, designers, producers, or developers)
- Meiko Kurita, Washington correspondent for Hakura News Network, in Stephen Mertz's novel The Korean Intercept (2005)
- Evila, a robotic replica of Ulala created to keep the truth from leaking and dubbed "The Ultimate Reporter", from the Space Channel 5 series (Note: Character themselves isn’t necessarily from Japan, but was created by Japanese writers, designers, producers, or developers)
- Spark Brushel, a freelance journalist that is a witness in Apollo Justice: Ace Attorney of the Ace Attorney series of video games (Note: Character themselves isn’t necessarily from Japan, but was created by Japanese writers, designers, producers, or developers)
- Taneo Tokuda, a journalist working for Juzo News in My Hero Academia.

=== Kazakhstan ===
- Borat Sagdiyev, from the mockumentary comedy film Borat

=== Mexico ===
- Vicente Chambón, from the TV series Chespirito

=== Sweden ===
- Annika Bengtzon, in novels by Liza Marklund
- Mikael Blomkvist, from the Millennium series by Stieg Larsson

=== Taiwan ===
- An Tsai-yung and Hung Mei-ling, from the TV series Channel-X
- Hsia Yu-shan, from the TV series Zero Day
- Hsu Shu-ching, from the TV series The Amazing Grace of Σ
- Huang Li-mei, from the film Lost in Perfection
- Kao Ming, from the TV series The Mirror
- Li Hsiao-wen / Li Ta-chih and Sung Chiao-an, from the TV series The World Between Us
- Liu Li-min, from the film The Post-Truth World
- News reporter, from the TV series Brave Animated Series

=== United Kingdom ===
==== Individual journalists ====
- Becky Burdock, from Jack Staff comics
- George Cragge, from In the Red and sequels by Mark Tavener
- Trent Crimm, Ted Lasso
- Froud, from the novel Stowaway to Mars by John Wyndham
- Bridget Jones, from Helen Fielding's columns, novels and films
- Jack Parlabane, from the novels of Christopher Brookmyre
- Alan Partridge, a character created by Steve Coogan from the I'm Alan Partridge series
- Ford Prefect, from The Hitchhiker's Guide to the Galaxy series
- Katie Reed, from Kim Newman's Anno Dracula series
- Vivian Rook, from the Doctor Who episode "The Sound of Drums"
- Rita Skeeter, from the Harry Potter series
- Sarah Jane Smith, from the television series Doctor Who
- Jim Stevens, from the Inspector Rebus novels by Ian Rankin.
- Mattie Storin, House of Cards
- Jasmine Thomas, Emmerdale
- Polly Becker, EastEnders
- Tony Hills, EastEnders
- William Boot, Scoop
- Thomas Fowler, The Quiet American
- John Dyson, Towards the End of the Morning
- Clint Smoker, Yellow Dog
- Rupert Psmith, Psmith, Journalist

==== Groups of U.K. journalists ====
- Ankh-Morpork Times' staff in the Discworld novels: William de Worde, Sacharissa Cripslock, Otto Chriek and others
- Various staff from Broken News; Josh Cashman, Richard Pritchard, Katie Tate, Adam Lockwood, Frances Walsh, Anthony Markovitz and others
- GlobeLink News staff in Drop the Dead Donkey; Gus Hedges, George Dent, Helen Cooper, Sally Smedley, Henry Davenport, Damien Day and others
- Daily Express journalists Peter Stelling (played by Edward Judd) and Bill Maguire (played by Leo McKern), The Day the Earth Caught Fire
- Weekend Update news anchors from Saturday Night Live UK: Ania Magliano and Paddy Young

=== United States ===
==== Individual journalists ====
- Alexander Knox, reporter for the Gotham Globe in the 1989 film Batman
- Andrea Sachs, aspiring journalist, played by Anne Hathaway in The Devil Wears Prada
- April O'Neil, anchorwoman for Channel 6 News in the 1987-1996 animated Teenage Mutant Ninja Turtles series
- Brenda Starr, reporter for the Chicago newspaper The Flash from the Brenda Starr comic strip and movies
- Brooke English, from All My Children soap opera
- Cameron "Buck" Williams, played by Kirk Cameron in the original film Left Behind and by Chad Michael Murray in the 2014 version of Left Behind
- Carrie Bradshaw from Sex and the City TV series
- Charles Foster Kane, newspaperman played by Orson Welles, in the film Citizen Kane
- Chloe Sullivan, former reporter for The Daily Planet, played by Allison Mack on TV series Smallville
- Chloe Talbot, on The Simpsons, Marge's high school chum who goes on to be a famous journalist
- Clark Kent, reporter for The Daily Planet by day and Superman off-duty, played by George Reeves in Adventures of Superman, Tom Welling on TV series Smallville and Henry Cavill in Man of Steel
- Clint Buchanan from One Life to Live soap opera
- Dan Vasser, reporter on Journeyman
- Herb Welch, veteran reporter on Saturday Night Live, a character played by Bill Hader.
- J. Jonah Jameson, editor-in-chief of the Daily Bugle in the Marvel Comics and MCU.
- Jackie Harvey, from The Onion
- Jefferson Drum, crusading frontier journalist played on the 1958 NBC series of the same name by Jeff Richards
- Jennifer Horton, from Days of Our Lives soap opera
- Jimmy Olsen, photographer for The Daily Planet, played by Jack Larson on Adventures of Superman and by Aaron Ashmore on TV series Smallville
- John Boy Walton, modeled on Earl Hamner, Jr., played by Richard Thomas and Robert Wightman on CBS's The Waltons
- Kent Brockman from The Simpsons TV series
- Kermit the Frog from Sesame Street
- Kit Kittredge, amateur journalist from the American Girl series of books
- Larry Appleton from Perfect Strangers
- Les Nessman, from WKRP in Cincinnati
- Lois Lane, reporter for The Daily Planet, played first by Phyllis Coates and then Noel Neill, on Adventures of Superman; played by Erica Durance on Smallville
- Lou Grant, newspaperman on series also called Lou Grant and on the earlier The Mary Tyler Moore Show
- Matt Bai, with Yahoo! News in the political thriller series House of Cards
- Michelle Capra, columnist from Northern Exposure
- Miranda Priestly, fashion magazine editor, played by Meryl Streep in The Devil Wears Prada
- Murphy Brown from the show of the same name, along with FYI staffers Jim Dial, Frank Fontana, Corky Sherwood, and Miles Silverberg
- Nancy Hicks-Gribble, voiced by Ashley Gardner, a weather girl, and later anchor on Channel 84 in Arlen, Texas on King of the Hill
- Nicole Walker, from Days of Our Lives soap opera
- Pepper Dennis, in the show of the same name
- Perry White, editor-in-chief of the Daily Planet, played by John Hamilton on Adventures of Superman
- Robin Scherbatsky, news anchor for New York cable news channel Metro News 1 in the sitcom How I Met Your Mother; famous for her use of the filler words "but, um" in that order, and falling in horse manure on live television
- Rory Gilmore, from Gilmore Girls
- Sabrina Spellman in the TV show Sabrina the Teenage Witch
- Snapper Carr, television news reporter in comic books and animated series featuring the Justice League
- Spider Jerusalem, the gonzo journalist of the future from the graphic novel Transmetropolitan
- Stephen Colbert, played by Stephen Colbert in The Colbert Report
- Steve Martin, reporter for United World News, played by Raymond Burr in the films Godzilla, King of the Monsters! (1956) and Godzilla 1985 (1985)
- Tess Mercer, executive editor and managing director of The Daily Planet played by Cassidy Freeman on TV series Smallville
- Tyra Nordbo from the Man-Kzin Wars
- Abby Townsend, press secretary to the First Lady of the United States, played by Celeste Holm on NBC's Nancy
- Adam MacLean, editor of Yellowstone Sentinel newspaper, played by Rex Reason on syndicated television series Man Without a Gun
- Amy Amanda "Triple A" Allen, reporter who covered The A-Team in the TV series by the same name
- Anson Bryson, Washington reporter, in William C. Heine's novel The Last Canadian (1974)
- Art Donovan, assistant city editor played by Jack Bannon, on Lou Grant
- Ben Andrews, police reporter in syndicated Manhunt, played from 1959 to 1961 by Patrick McVey
- Ben Caxton, an investigative journalist in Robert Heinlein's novel Stranger in a Strange Land
- Ben Gregory, magazine writer played by Barry Coe, on ABC's Follow the Sun (1961–1962)
- Bill Hastings, writer of the advice-to-the-lovelorn column of the fictitious Los Angeles Daily Star, played by Peter Lawford, on NBC's Dear Phoebe (1954–1955)
- Billie Newman, reporter played by Linda Kelsey, on Lou Grant
- Bill Norton, New York Herald reporter in Eric Frank Russell's novel, Dreadful Sanctuary (1948)
- Billy Batson, radio news reporter and the secret identity of the comic book superhero Captain Marvel
- Bob Wallace, son of the newspaper editor, played by Scott McKay on CBS's Honestly, Celeste!
- Bryan Denton, reporter for the New York Sun in Disney's musical Newsies
- Carl Kolchak, played by Darren McGavin on ABC's Kolchak: The Night Stalker
- Celeste Anders, reporter for the New York Express, played by Celeste Holm in the CBS sitcom Honestly, Celeste! (1954)
- Chick Adams, reporter in New York City played by Jack Weston, on the CBS sitcom My Sister Eileen (1960–1961)
- Chris Higby, copy-boy of New York Record, played by Gary Vinson on The Roaring 20's
- Christine Massey, magazine writer played by Loretta Young on The New Loretta Young Show
- Cy Bennett, editor of Today's World magazine, played by John Dehner on CBS's The Doris Day Show
- D.X. Beaumont, magazine editor played by Raymond Bailey, on My Sister Eileen
- Danny Concannon, Senior White House Correspondent for The Washington Post, played by Timothy Busfield on The West Wing
- Danny Taylor, reporter for New York Globe, played by Harry Guardino on The Reporter
- Dave Tabak, copy editor played by Robert F. Simon on NBC's Saints and Sinners
- Diane Simmons, anchor on the TV show Family Guy
- Dick Preston, radio host in Arizona, played by Dick Van Dyke on CBS's The New Dick Van Dyke Show
- Dion Patrick, Irish American newspaperman played by Adam Kennedy, on NBC's The Californians (1957–1958)
- Doris Martin, journalist for magazine Today's World, played by Doris Day on CBS's The Doris Day Show
- Duke William, journalist with New York Record, played by John Dehner on The Roaring 20's
- Emily Cowles, advice columnist, played by Ruth McDevitt on ABC's Kolchak: The Night Stalker
- Francis Wilde, photographer played by Randy Boone on CBS's western Cimarron Strip
- Frankly Unctuous, TV newscaster, in The Throne of Saturn (1971)
- Gallegher, teenage cub reporter played by Roger Mobley, on NBC's Walt Disney's Wonderful World of Color (1964–1965)
- George Faber, a Rome-based television journalist played by David Janssen in The Shoes of the Fisherman
- Grant Gabriel, former assistant editor of The Daily Planet, played by Michael Cassidy on TV series Smallville
- Hal Towne, newspaper columnist on CBS's The Dennis O'Keefe Show, with Dennis O'Keefe in the featured role
- Harris Claibourne, editor of The Tombstone Epitaph, played by Richard Eastham on ABC series Tombstone Territory (1957–1960)
- Hildy Johnson, reporter played by Rosalind Russell in His Girl Friday
- Howard Beale, TV news anchor of the UBS Evening News, played by Peter Finch in the film Network
- I. M. Fletcher, investigative journalist from the Fletch series of novels by Gregory Mcdonald
- Ichabod Adams, former newspaper owner played by George Chandler on CBS's sitcom Ichabod and Me (1961–1962)
- Jack Deveraux played by Mathew Ashford, on Days of our Lives, Soap Opera.
- Jack Flood, newspaper researcher played by Robert Harland, on ABC's Target: The Corruptors!
- Jack McEvoy in Michael Connelly's 1996 mystery novel The Poet
- Jack McGee, reporter for The National Register on The Incredible Hulk
- Jack Ryder, journalist and alter-ego of the Creeper, superhero and occasional ally of Batman
- Jamie Campbell in the television series Zoo
- Jefferson Crowley, newspaper editor played by Edmond O'Brien in "Gallegher" segments of NBC's Walt Disney's Wonderful World of Color
- John King, TV reporter for CNN, on the US TV series House of Cards
- John Larsen, owner of a comic book company, played by Jerome Cowan on The Tab Hunter Show
- Kara Zor'El / Kara Danvers (By day) Super Girl by night, in the television series "Supergirl".
- Kate Ripperton, voiced by Asta Parry, in several stories and editions of the Dark Shadows Audio drama series by Big Finish Productions.
- Kat Grant, editor of Catco Media, played by Calista Flockhart, Kara Danver's first boss, in season one of Supergirl.
- Kelly O'Donnell, non-fictional anchor/reporter for NBC News, making guest appearance on US House of Cards
- Klugie, photographer played by Richard Erdman, on Saints and Sinners
- Lana Winters, investigative journalist falsely admitted to Briarcliff Asylum on Ryan Murphy's eerie American Horror Story: Asylum. Played by Sarah Paulson.
- Linda van Schoonhoven, voiced by Tress MacNeille, is the perky human blonde co-anchor of The √2 News on Futurama
- Lloyd Ramsey, small-town newspaper editor played by Ford Rainey, in Robert Young's CBS sitcom Window on Main Street
- Lou Sheldon, city editor of New York Globe, played by Gary Merrill on CBS's The Reporter (1964)
- Maddy Bowen, reporter played by Jennifer Connelly in Blood Diamond
- Margaret Pynchon, elitist publisher played by Nancy Marchand on Lou Grant
- Mark Grainger, editor played by John Larkin on NBC's Saints and Sinners
- Mark Markin, INN/CNN reporter in Lash-Up (2001 novella/2015 novel by Larry Bond)
- Mary Jane "MJ" Watson is a character appearing in American comic books published by Marvel Comics.
- Matt Anders, freelance anti-communist journalist at the height of the Cold War, played by Brian Keith in the 1955-1956 CBS adventure/drama Crusader
- Mickey Riley, sports writer at the fictitious Los Angeles Daily Star, played by Marcia Henderson, on NBC's Dear Phoebe, 1954–1955
- Miles Clarkson, music journalist from The Mephisto Waltz
- Monique Marmelstein, intern reporter, played by Carol Ann Susi on ABC's Kolchak: The Night Stalker
- Morbo the Annihilator, voiced by Maurice LaMarche, the belligerent alien co-anchor of The √2 News on Futurama
- Mr. Fosdick, newspaper boss played by Charles Lane on the NBC series Dear Phoebe (1954–1955)
- Mr. Wallace, newspaper editor, played by Geoffrey Lumb (1905–1990) on CBS's Honestly, Celeste!
- Murray Scarvi, columnist and radio commentator opposed to the Apollo program, in William R. Shelton's novel Stowaway to the Moon: The Camelot Odyssey (1973)
- Nick Alexander, reporter played by Nick Adams, on NBC's Saints and Sinners (1962)
- Nic Pappas, in Peter J. Gallanis's 2014 mystery novel The Reporter, Part I - Rise and Fall
- Nina Romina, TV news anchor from Nightcrawler played by Rene Russo
- Pat Garrison, reporter for New York Record, played by Donald May on The Roaring 20's (1960–1962)
- Paul Beltzer, magazine publisher played by James Philbrook, on CBS's The New Loretta Young Show
- Paul Marino, newspaper reporter played by Stephen McNally on Target: The Corruptors!
- Paul Morgan, cartoonist played by Tab Hunter on NBC's The Tab Hunter Show (1960–1961)
- Paul Templin, magazine writer played by Brett Halsey on Follow the Sun
- Percy "P.C.M." Mercy, editor of View magazine, in Allen Drury's novel The Throne of Saturn (1971)
- Phoebe Halliwell, advice columnist of Ask Phoebe for the fictional The Bay Mirror, played by Alyssa Milano on The CW's Charmed (1998–2006)
- Rick Jason, magazine researcher played by Gary Lockwood on Follow the Sun
- Robert "Bob" Major, newspaper owner played by Robert Sterling on CBS series Ichabod and Me
- Ron Updyke, disdainful reporter, played by Jack Grinnage on ABC's Kolchak: The Night Stalker
- Roxanne Ritchi, reporter and love interest of the main character in DreamWorks' Megamind.
- Ruth Sherwood, magazine writer played by Elaine Stritch on My Sister Eileen
- Sam Miller, publisher of the Wilcox Clarion of Wilcox, Arizona, in five episodes of the western series 26 Men (1957–1959)
- Scott Norris, reporter of New York Record, played by Rex Reason on ABC's The Roaring 20's
- Sierra Jennings, from the All About Us franchise
- Steve Wilson, in CBS' Big Town, managing editor of The Illustrated Press in a large American city, played from 1950 to 1954 by Patrick McVey
- Sweet Polly Purebred, reporter for TTV in the television series Underdog; her boss was O.J. Skweez
- Tally Atwater, broadcast journalist in the 1996 film Up Close & Personal
- Ted Baxter, talking head from The Mary Tyler Moore Show
- Tom Bradford, editor and columnist of fictional Sacramento Register, modeled on novel by Tom Braden, played by Dick Van Patten on ABC's Eight Is Enough
- Tom Grunick, TV news anchor played by William Hurt in the film Broadcast News
- Tom Jumbo-Grumbo, voiced by Keith Olbermann, blue whale anchor on BoJack Horseman
- Tom Tucker, news anchor on Family Guy
- Tony Vincenzo, newspaper editor, played by Simon Oakland on ABC's Kolchak: The Night Stalker
- Trevor Newsworthy from The Fresh Prince of Bel-Air TV series
- Tricia Takanawa, reporter on Family Guy
- Trinity Wells in the television series Doctor Who and The Sarah Jane Adventures
- Trudy Monk, San Francisco journalist and late wife of Adrian Monk in the TV series Monk
- Vernon Fenwick, anchorman and cameraman for Channel 6 News in the Teenage Mutant Ninja Turtles universe
- Vicki Vale in the Batman series from the DC Universe superhero comics and the 1989 film
- Vic Sage in The Question series from the DC Universe superhero comics
- Walter 'Wichita' Garrett from The Return of Doctor X, 1939 film
- Walter Burns, reporter played by Cary Grant in His Girl Friday
- William Miller, teenage aspiring rock journalist, played by Patrick Fugit in Almost Famous
- Willie Maxwell, reporter in Center City, Iowa, played by Eddie Applegate on NBC's Nancy (1970)
- Will McAvoy, anchor and managing editor of "News Night", played by Jeff Daniels on HBO's The Newsroom

==== Groups of U.S. journalists ====
- Daily Bugle staff in the Spider-Man series: J. Jonah Jameson, Peter Parker, Betty Brant Leeds, Ned Leeds, Frederick Foswell, Robbie Robertson, Ben Urich, Lance Bannon and others from the Marvel Universe superhero comics, then passed onto comic strips, TV series and films
- Daily Planet and Galaxy Broadcasting staff in the Superman series: Clark Kent, Lois Lane, Jimmy Olsen, Perry White, Lana Lang, Morgan Edge and others from DC Comics US superhero comics, then passed onto comic strips, television series, and films
- The Lone Gunmen, aka Melvin Frohike, Richard "Ringo" Langly and John Fitzgerald Byers, who cover conspiracies in their self-titled magazine and The Magic Bullet on The X-Files and their own spinoff series, The Lone Gunmen
- San Diego Channel Four News Team in the movie Anchorman: The Legend of Ron Burgundy : Ron Burgundy, anchorman, alongside co-anchor Veronica Corningstone, weatherman Brick Tamland, sportscaster Champ Kind, and field reporter Brian Fantana; Burgundy's rival from Channel Two is Wes Mantooth
- Fictional newspaper Lush For Life's entire staff
- The Palatine Star, located in the city of Palatine, Ill. Series: Reporter, by Peter J. Gallanis
- The team of journalists in Civil War: war photojournalist Lee Smith (Kirsten Dunst), Reuters journalist Joel Martinez (Wagner Moura), The New York Times journalist Sammy (Stephen McKinley Henderson), and 23-year-old aspiring photographer Jessie Cullen (Cailee Spaeny)
- The French Dispatch staff in The French Dispatch: editor Arthur Howitzer Jr. (Bill Murray), copy editor Alumna (Elisabeth Moss), cartoonist Hermes Jones (Jason Schwartzman), travel writer Herbsaint Sazerac (Owen Wilson), writer J.K.L. Berensen (Tilda Swinton), journalist Lucinda Krementz (Frances McDormand), and food writer Roebuck Wright (Jeffrey Wright)
- Weekend Update news anchors from Saturday Night Live: Chevy Chase, Jane Curtin, Dan Aykroyd, Bill Murray, Charles Rocket, Gail Matthius, Brian Doyle-Murray, Mary Gross, Christine Ebersole, Brad Hall, Christopher Guest, Dennis Miller, Kevin Nealon, Norm Macdonald, Colin Quinn, Tina Fey, Jimmy Fallon, Amy Poehler, Seth Meyers, Cecily Strong, Colin Jost, and Michael Che
