= Sian Blake =

British actress (1972–2015)

- Screenshot from a 1997 episode of EastEnders showing Blake in character as Frankie Pierre
- Born: Sian Samantha Blake; 14 September 1972; Walthamstow, London, England
- Disappeared: 13 December 2015
- Died: 14 or 15 December 2015 (aged 43); Erith, London, England
- Body discovered: 5 January 2016
- Other name: Syan Blake
- Occupation: Actress
- Years active: 1994–2009, 2015
- Known for: Playing Frankie Pierre in EastEnders
- Height: 5 ft 2 in (1.57 m)
- Partner: Arthur Simpson-Kent
- Children: Zachary Bilal Kent-Blake (deceased); Amon Ben George Kent-Blake (deceased)

Sian Samantha Blake (14 September 1972 – 14 or 15 December 2015), also known by her stage name Syan Blake, was a British actress, best known for playing Frankie Pierre on the BBC soap opera EastEnders, appearing in 56 episodes between 1996 and 1997. She later had minor roles in other television shows, before retiring to become a sign language teacher and interpreter.

Blake and her two children were reported missing on 16 December 2015; three weeks later their bodies were found at Blake's home in Erith, London. Her partner, Arthur Simpson-Kent, pleaded guilty to murdering them and was given a whole life order in October 2016.

== Early life and career ==
Blake was born in Walthamstow, London on 14 September 1972, and attended the Guildford School of Acting. She was the youngest of three children, and her father was Jamaican. Her parents divorced when she was six, and her father died from a heart attack when she was eighteen. Adopting the stage name Syan Blake, she landed her first acting role in 1994, playing a bulimia patient in that year's Christmas episode of Casualty.

After working as a telephone receptionist at a doctor's surgery, Blake landed her most notable role: soul singer Frankie Pierre, a character who appeared in EastEnders during 1996 and 1997. She initially auditioned for the minor part of a nurse, but was encouraged to audition for the more long-term role of Frankie after impressing producers. She was initially signed on a six-month contract, but subsequently had her contract extended. One of the character's central storylines involved an affair with a regular male character which ended his on-screen marriage. Blake subsequently said that she left the series after receiving hate mail from viewers who found it difficult to separate fact from fiction.

Blake went on to have roles in Doctors, The Bill and Skins, as well as a second appearance in Casualty, before retiring from acting. She went on to become a sign-language teacher, and interpreter.

As well as television and film, Blake also appeared in and directed several theatre productions. Her acting credits include Joe Guy, Love's Labour's Lost, and Twelfth Night, while directing credits include Oxford Street at the Soho Theatre and The Burial at the Almeida Theatre.

== Personal life ==
Blake lived in Erith, London, with her partner, Arthur Simpson-Kent, and their two sons, Zachary and Amon, who were aged eight and four. Blake was diagnosed with terminal motor neurone disease on 11 December 2015 after first showing neurological symptoms in September 2013.

== Disappearance and death ==
Blake and her two sons went missing on 13 December 2015. On 16 December, a family member reported her missing to the Metropolitan Police. Police interviewed her partner, Arthur Simpson-Kent, the same day, and he went missing three days later. Her sister said that Blake had wanted to end her relationship with Simpson-Kent "a long time ago".

Blake's car was discovered on 3 January 2016 in Bethnal Green. On 5 January 2016, police searched Blake's home and found three bodies in the garden. They started a murder investigation. On 7 January investigators confirmed that the bodies had been identified as Blake and her two children, and said that they had each died from head and neck injuries.

Police said that Simpson-Kent was being sought in relation to the deaths; the BBC reported that he was believed to have travelled to Ghana in December. On 9 January a Scotland Yard spokesman said that police in Ghana had arrested Simpson-Kent, who had travelled there on 19 December; he was remanded for two weeks. Simpson-Kent's lawyer, Justice Srem-Sai, said that he should be released from prison until official extradition proceedings were underway.

On 26 January, Simpson-Kent appeared at an extradition hearing in Accra, where he told the court that he would voluntarily return to the UK; he returned to the UK on 12 February 2016 and was arrested at Heathrow Airport and charged with the murder of Blake and their two children. On 10 June, Simpson-Kent appeared at the Old Bailey where he formally entered guilty pleas to the murders of Blake and their two sons. On 5 October 2016, Mr Justice Singh sentenced Simpson-Kent to life imprisonment with a whole life order, meaning he will not become eligible for parole and is unlikely to ever be released from prison.

On 6 January 2016, the Metropolitan Police referred itself to the Independent Police Complaints Commission over its handling of the inquiry. Of the referral, the Metropolitan Police said "The Metropolitan Police has today, Wednesday 6 January, made a voluntary referral to the Independent Police Complaints Commission in relation to the Sian Blake missing person investigation. An initial review has highlighted some potential issues regarding the handling and grading of the missing persons investigation. The Directorate of Professional Standards was informed on Monday, 4 January, and is working with the investigation team to fully understand the timeline of police interaction with the family."

== Filmography ==
Year	Title	Role	Notes
1994	Casualty	Angela Carlisle	"Talking Turkey"
1996–1997	EastEnders	Frankie Pierre	56 episodes
1998	Siberia	Maggie	
2003	The Death of Klinghoffer	Helen	
2003	The Bill	Ginny	Episode 099
2003	Casualty	Donna	"Truth or Dare"
2004	May 33rd	Social Worker	
2004	Doctors	Kim Ellis	"Perfect"
2007	The Last Detective	Claire the Singer	"Dangerous Liaisons"
2009	Skins	Interpreter	"Everyone"
2009	The Secret Dancer	Chloe	Short film
2015	Final Fantasy XIV: Heavensward	Yugiri Mistwalker (voice)	Video game

== See also ==
- List of prisoners with whole-life tariffs
- Lists of solved missing person cases
