= Nick Sharman =

English novelist

- Born: Scott Grønmark; November 20, 1952; Oslo, Norway
- Died: June 29, 2020 (aged 67); London, UK
- Occupation: Novelist
- Writing career
- Pen name: Nick Sharman, Alexander Scott, A. G. Scott
- Website: scottgronmark.blogspot.com

Scott Grønmark (1952–2020), best known for his pen name Nick Sharman, was a Norwegian-born English author of horror fiction.

== Life and works ==
Grønmark was born in Oslo in 1952. His father and mother had met in England during World War Two; he, an officer in the Luftforsvaret, was a bomber pilot with the RAF, and she was in the Women's Auxiliary Air Force. In 1958, upon his father being posted to the Norwegian embassy in the United Kingdom, the family relocated to London.

After graduating at Cambridge, Grønmark went on to work in publicity for an academic publishing house in Camden, and then in public relations for New English Library, an imprint specializing in original mass-market paperbacks in the genres of fantasy, science fiction, mystery and horror, and whose roster included staple names such as Stephen King, Harold Robbins, Robert Bloch, Brian Aldiss, and Frank Herbert. Grønmark first tried his own luck at writing in 1977; his debut horror novel The Cats (likely capitalizing on the success of James Herbert's 1974 best-seller The Rats) sold 100,000 copies in the UK alone. Because he held a position at NEL at the time, he couldn't use his own name, so he came up with the pseudonym Nick Sharman.

With this first success, Grønmark was able to become a full-time writer, publishing more horror novels in the tradition of NEL: rich in violence, gore, and sexploitation. Outside of the horror genre, he began a series of historical adventure stories set in Scotland during the peak of Jacobitism, "Highland Rebel" (1978), but only two books were released, under the pseudonym Alexander Scott. His last novel, Steel Gods (1990) would be the only one to be published under his real name.

== Novels ==
- The Cats (1977)
- The Scourge (1980)
- The Surrogate (1980)
- Childmare (1980) (also as by A. G. Scott)
- Judgment Day (1982)
- The Switch (1984)
- You're Next! (1986) (also as Next!)
- Steel Gods (1990) (as by Scott Grønmark)

=== Highland Rebel series (as Alexander Scott) ===
- The Devil's Clan (1978)
- Capture the Prince! (1978)
