= George Palmer (EastEnders) =

Fictional character from EastEnders

- EastEnders character
- Portrayed by: Paul Moriarty
- Duration: 1996–1998
- First appearance: Episode 1311; 4 July 1996
- Last appearance: Episode 1705; 8 December 1998
- Introduced by: Corinne Hollingworth
In-universe information
- Occupation: Gangster; Businessman
- Wife: Alison Palmer (backstory)
- Daughters: Annie Palmer

George Palmer is a fictional character from the BBC soap opera EastEnders, played by Paul Moriarty. He appeared between 4 July 1996 and 8 December 1998, being one of many characters axed by then executive producer Matthew Robinson.

== Creation and development ==
Actor Paul Moriarty was asked to read for the role of George along with 10 other actors. Moriarty was called back instantly and asked to begin working on the role the following day. He has commented to an American fan-based publication, "[It was] quite overwhelming. I had watched the show but not religiously [...] So I show up at [the studios in] Borehamwood the very next day, straight to make-up and then onto [the soap's setting of] Albert Square to do my first bit [...] I might just as well have landed on Mars."

George has been described as "shady". Moriarty has described his character's original outline as given to him by the production crew when he accepted the role: "The man’s background, as it was explained in the prepared bio which I received, was pretty nasty. He was a violent man-very bad news. He murdered people. He’d been this vicious boxer who punched and clawed his way up the ladder, disposing of a body here and there over the years if it helped him get to where he wanted to go. He wasn’t just into fencing stolen goods, you know! He was really meant to be this hard, ruthless bastard." However, as Moriarty has inferred, his character altered somewhat from the original outline following the development of his relationship with the soap's matriarch Peggy Mitchell, played by Barbara Windsor: "Obviously the character evolved in a certain way as the writers wanted to pursue the idea of George being a love interest for one of their important leading ladies. They simply wouldn’t allow her to be involved with a cold-blooded murderer because that wouldn’t reflect well in her character. Besides, inevitable comparisons would have then been drawn between Peggy and George on EastEnders, and Barbara having been married in real life to a gangster, Ronnie Knight." Despite this, as author Kate Lock has suggested, "George Palmer's name carried serious clout in the criminal underworld" and it was these dalliances in illegal activity that eventually ended George and Peggy's romance. Moriarty has been asked about Peggy's negative reaction to George's criminality because, as the interviewer noted, Peggy's backstory consists of a first marriage to a suggested gangster, Eric Mitchell, and Peggy had accepted his dealings and turned a blind-eye. Moriarty responded, "I suppose [Peggy being] made landlady [of the soap's pub] did that to her – airs and graces! But that's what happens on soaps if you stay a long-term character. You've got to be made sympathetic and even moral to an extent. So they had Peggy and George being all right for a while, and then George would inevitably screw up and they'd make up again – over and over. Barbara turned to me one night as we were driving home and said, 'This is getting to be bloody boring now, isn't it?' She wasn't half right. Quite frankly, the show didn't know what to make of George. That's why they brought on [his daughter] Annie [Nadia Sawalha] – to do the dirty work for him! That's actually quite accurate of the East End villain these days. They swan around in these dapper suits and get someone else to hide the money – or the bodies."

The character was one of many to be axed in 1998 by Executive Producer Matthew Robinson, following a dip in ratings.

== Storylines ==
George Palmer first arrived at Albert Square to expand his business in Walford. It quickly turns out that George is a major figure in the East End criminal underworld who owns an illegal gambling den/money laundering operation, which masquerades as a members' only club known as The Market Cellar. He soon catches the attention of Peggy Mitchell (Barbara Windsor), local landlady of The Queen Victoria public house who disapproves of the business and tries to petition against it.

Pragmatically, George begins wooing Peggy in order to stop the objections to his club. He succeeds and soon finds himself growing attracted to Peggy, who eventually blossoms into genuine attraction towards him. George supports Peggy through breast cancer and they announce their engagement at Christmas 1996. However, Peggy's two hardman sons Phil (Steve McFadden) and Grant (Ross Kemp) learn about George's illegal activities and they subsequently inform Peggy about it; Peggy responds by dumping George despite his attempt to win her back. After being unable to recoup his relationship with Peggy and upon finding his business in trouble, George flees to New Zealand where his criminal empire is based. During his absence at one stage, Peggy and her family end up getting into a conflict with the local mob who are seeking to hunt down George.

Later on, George reappears on the square to continue establishing his operation. He is soon joined by his daughter Annie (Nadia Sawalha), who had originally appeared to be his business partner sent to help him run the operation. It soon becomes clear that their relationship has become strained, as Annie had always felt her father wanted a son instead of a daughter and she continuously tries to prove her potential to George. As she makes progress in doing so, George forms a romance with local resident Rosa di Marco (Louise Jameson) – who had recently become a widow. By the time George and Rosa have gotten engaged, it emerges they had an affair just years before George had moved into Walford – at the time which Rosa's husband Giuseppe was in prison. It also becomes apparent to Rosa that George is possibly the father of her younger son Gianni (Marc Bannerman), but this eventually turns out to be false when George does a DNA test and it later confirms that he is not Gianni's father.

Afterwards, George breaks up his engagement with Rosa and authorizes Annie to manage his business for him as he decides to return to New Zealand; he departs the square in 1998 and Annie soon joins him a year later.

== See also ==
- List of soap opera villains
