= Brian Croucher =

English actor (born 1942)

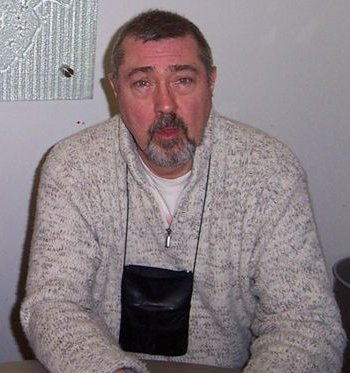
- Croucher in 2005
- Born: 1942 (age 83–84)
- Occupations: Actor; director
- Years active: 1964–present
- Known for: EastEnders, Blake's 7

Brian Croucher (born 1942) is an English actor and director best known for his role as Ted Hills, which he played from 1995 to 1997, in the soap opera EastEnders. Croucher also had a regular role in the science fiction series Blake's 7.

== Career ==
Croucher has appeared in a number of science fiction programmes, including being the second actor to portray Travis in Blake's 7. He played Borg in the Doctor Who story The Robots of Death. He also appeared in the Doctor Who spin-off Shakedown: Return of the Sontarans. Earlier, in 1973, he played a key protagonist in the children's adventure series The Jensen Code.

In 1978, Croucher played a major role opposite Tom Bell in the Thames Television/Euston Films thriller series Out. He also played the role of Rooky in the Southern Television series The Famous Five, in the double episode "Five Get into Trouble".

One of Croucher's earliest film roles was in the Carol Reed film musical of Lionel Bart's Oliver!; he played one of the London Bridge bargemen—a small uncredited speaking part. His other film roles include Burke & Hare (1972), Made (1972), A Nightingale Sang in Berkeley Square (1979), Scrubbers (1983), and Underworld (1985).

Apart from acting, Croucher has directed two short films, Rank (2009, co-written with Nick Wilkinson) and Vodka & Coke (2013), also written and produced by Wilkinson.

== Selected filmography ==
=== Film ===
List of film appearances, with year, title, and role shown
Year	Title	Role	Notes
1968	Oliver!	Barge operator	Uncredited
1972	Burke & Hare	Client in brothel	
1972	Made	Arthur	
1979	A Nightingale Sang in Berkeley Square	Gregory Peck	
1982	Scrubbers	Leo	
1985	Underworld	Darling	
1994	Shakedown: Return of the Sontarans	Kurt	
1994	Shopping	Billy's dad	
2003	I'll Sleep When I'm Dead	Al Shaw	
2011	Big Fat Gypsy Gangster	Mr. Eels	
2012	Outside Bet	Phil	
2017	Rise of the Footsoldier 3	Prison governor	
2018	Welcome to Curiosity	Stubbs	
2021	The Pebble and the Boy	Danny	

=== Television ===
List of television appearances, with year, title, and role shown
Year	Title	Role	Notes
1969–75	Softly, Softly: Taskforce	Various	3 episodes
1973	The Jensen Code	Gordon	13 episodes
1974	General Hospital	Ralph Keeton	2 episodes
1977	Doctor Who	Borg	2 episodes
1977	The XYY Man	Reisen	4 episodes
1977	Treasure Island	John Hunter	3 episodes
1978	Out	Chris Cottle	5 episodes
1978	The Famous Five	Rooky	2 episodes
1979	Minder	Big John	1 episode
1979	Blake's 7	Space Commander Travis	8 episodes
1980	The Gentle Touch	Harry Blanden	2 episodes
1981	The Chinese Detective	Jack Mangan	2 episodes
1981	Blood Money	David	2 episodes
1984	Miracles Take Longer	Sid Archer	2 episodes
1984	The Last Days of Pompeii	Melior	3 episodes
1984	The Young Ones	Real bank robber	2 episodes
1985–2008	The Bill	Various	11 episodes
1987–88	Bread	1st Policeman / Dino the Robber	2 episodes
1988	Rockliffe's Babies	Chief Superintendent Barry Wyatt	6 episodes
1990–91	Grange Hill	Mr. Glanville	2 episodes
1995–97	EastEnders	Ted Hills	104 episodes
