= Paul Moriarty (actor) =

British actor (born 1946)

- Born: 19 May 1946 (age 80); London, England, UK
- Occupation: Actor
- Notable work: EastEnders

Paul Moriarty (born 19 May 1946) is a British actor. He is best known for playing Det. Sgt. Jake Barrett in the ITV police series The Gentle Touch (1980–1984) and George Palmer in the BBC soap opera EastEnders (1996–1998). Known for having a strong cockney accent, Moriarty has often been cast in police or criminal roles and has played police officers in ten different television shows throughout his career.

== Life and career ==
Moriarty was born and raised in London, England. His acting career began in the early-1970s when he had recurring roles in the drama serial Seven Days in the Life of Andrew Pelham (1971, part of the BBC's Thirty-Minute Theatre series), and in the 1972 ITV series Holly. He also made guest appearances in several popular television shows including Coronation Street, Z Cars and The Sweeney. He also appeared in Milk-O, a sitcom pilot written by Bob Grant in 1975.

In 1980, Moriarty landed the role of Detective Sargeant Jake Barrett in the groundbreaking ITV police series The Gentle Touch, a role he played until 1984. After this he continued to play guest roles on established British television series such as Casualty, The Bill, Maigret and Wycliffe. Again playing a police officer, he had a recurring role as Sgt. Bill Wells in the ITV series A Touch of Frost. In 1995, he played Col. Forster in the BBC's acclaimed adaptation of Jane Austen's Pride and Prejudice.

The following year, he had a recurring role in the ITV crime drama series The Knock, before landing one of his best known roles as gangster George Palmer in the popular long-running BBC soap opera EastEnders. Moriarty's character appeared from 1 July 1996 until 8 December 1998, when his character was one of many axed by executive producer Matthew Robinson, following a dip in ratings. Since leaving EastEnders, Moriarty has continued to appear in television shows, including Doctors as Leonard Beaumont and George Grant, Holby City and Ashes to Ashes.

Moriarty has often been cast in police or criminal roles, and has played a police officer in at least ten different British television series: Z Cars, The Gentle Touch, Between the Lines, A Touch of Frost, Maigret, Peak Practice, Expert Witness, Murder Most Horrid, Doctors and Ashes to Ashes.
