= Victoria Gould =

British actress

- Occupation: Actress
- Years active: 1997–present
- Notable work: Polly Becker in EastEnders

Victoria Gould is a British actress, best known for playing the character of journalist Polly Becker on the BBC television soap opera EastEnders from 1997 to 1998.

Gould moved on to professional theatre work, and is now a member of progressive physical theatre company Complicité. She has an MSc degree in mathematics, a subject that she often combines into the collective nature of Complicité's work. She is currently based in Brighton.

In 2006, she guest-starred in the Big Finish Productions audio production Sapphire and Steel: The School.
