= Roberta Taylor =

English actress and author (1948–2024)

- Taylor as Irene Raymond in EastEnders
- Born: Roberta Alexandra Mary Roberts; 26 February 1948; West Ham, Essex, England
- Died: 6 July 2024 (aged 76); London, England
- Occupations: Actress; author
- Years active: 1972–2024
- Television: EastEnders (1997–2000); The Bill (2002-2008)
- Spouses: Victor Taylor (m. 1966; div. 1975) Peter Guinness (m. 1996)
- Children: 1

Roberta Alexandra Mary Taylor (née Roberts; 26 February 1948 – 6 July 2024) was an English actress and author. She was known for her roles of Irene Raymond in EastEnders (1997–2000) and Inspector Gina Gold in The Bill (2002–2008).

== Career ==
Taylor worked in the theatre and appeared at the Glasgow Citizens Theatre from 1980 to 1992. During that period, she played La Duchesse de Guermantes in a stage adaptation of Marcel Proust's A la recherche du temps perdu (Remembrance of Things Past) entitled A Waste of Time, in which Rupert Everett and Gary Oldman were also in the cast. She was also seen in Noël Coward's Design for Living, Oscar Wilde's A Woman of No Importance and An Ideal Husband. She was the Princess Kosmonopolis in Tennessee Williams' Sweet Bird of Youth in 1992, and in 1995 played the Nurse in Shakespeare's Romeo and Juliet at the Lyric Hammersmith.

She also appeared in episodes of the television series Doctors, Sharman, Holby City, Silent Witness, Shakespeare and Hathaway and Inspector Morse. She has appeared as a guest on The Paul O'Grady Show and in the films The Witches (1990) and Tom & Viv (1994). She has also appeared as herself on Lily Savage's Blankety Blank.

In 2005 she played Mrs Pardiggle in the BBC's drama serial adaptation of Charles Dickens' Bleak House. In 2009, she starred as the long-suffering Phoebe Rice in John Osborne's play The Entertainer at the Royal Exchange Theatre in Manchester. In 2011 she appeared in the West End revival of Pygmalion, alongside Rupert Everett, Kara Tointon and Diana Rigg. In September 2017, Taylor made a guest appearance in Casualty.

== Books ==
Alongside her acting career, Taylor was an author. Her first book, Too Many Mothers, a memoir of her childhood, was published in October 2005. She was criticised by two cousins for some of the content in the book, with one of the cousins claiming that she was "too flippant about traumatic events in his difficult past". She refused to remove any of the content prior to publication, and later walked away from one of them at a book signing. Her first novel, The Reinvention of Ivy Brown, was published in November 2008.

== Personal life and death ==
Born out of wedlock to Robert Alexander Archer, an already married bus conductor, Taylor was brought up by her mother Winifred Roberts, aunts, and grandmother.

She married Victor Taylor on 1 April 1966. The couple had a son but divorced in 1975. Taylor met actor Peter Guinness while working with the Glasgow Citizens Theatre. They married in September 1996 after having been together for twenty years. Guinness appeared in a few episodes of The Bill as her character’s lover in 2007.

Taylor died of pneumonia following a fall, on 6 July 2024, at the age of 76. Taylor had suffered from emphysema due to being a "dedicated smoker".

== Filmography ==
- Lady Killers – Roberta Martin (1980)
- Wolcott – Mrs Godden (1981)
- Inspector Morse – Sheila Williams (1987)
- One Way Out – Athene (1989)
- The Bill– Angie Purser (1990)
- The Witches – Chef Witch (1990)
- Minder – Pat Norris (1991)
- In Suspicious Circumstances – Violette Kaye (1994)
- Tom and Viv – Ottoline Morrell (1994)
- The Turnaround – Aggie (1995)
- Dangerfield – Mrs Weatherall (1995)
- Sharman – Aggie (1996)
- Silent Witness – Dr de Groot (1997)
- The Knock – Ms Gardiner (1997)
- EastEnders – Irene Raymond (1997–2000; 292 episodes)
- The Passion – Jane (1999)
- Doctors – Rachel Whiting (2001)
- Holby City – Karen Lake (2002)
- The Bill – Inspector Gina Gold (2002–2008)
- Murder Investigation Team – Inspector Gina Gold (2003)
- Bleak House – Mrs Pardiggle (2005)
- Father Brown – Sister Paul (2013)
- Viceroy's House – Miss Reading (2017)
- Casualty – Margie Mogford (2017)
- The Foreigner – Mrs Taylor (2017)
- Shakespeare & Hathaway: Private Investigators – Gloria Fonteyn (2018–2022) final role
- Luther – Celia Lavender (2019)
