= Mark Homer =

British actor

- Born: Mark Homer; 1973 (age 52–53); Dartford, England
- Occupations: Actor, writer
- Years active: 1995–present
- Spouse: Jane Denney
- Children: 2

Mark Homer (born 1973) is an English actor and writer. He is best known for playing Tony Hills in the popular British soap opera EastEnders from 1995 to 1999. His subsequent work includes guest appearances in Silent Witness and Spine Chillers, both also for the BBC. In 2000, Homer appeared in a play called Boxed at London's Riverside Studios, which he co-wrote with Carolina Giammetta (who also starred in the play) and EastEnders director Ray Kilby (the play's director).

== Career ==
Homer's first television acting role was playing Tony Hills on EastEnders. He worked on the soap from 1995 to 1999. On playing the role, Homer (who is straight) told the Huffington Post in 2016: "My biggest challenge was making Tony Hills as believable as I could [...] I used to get so many letters from vulnerable teenagers who felt totally alone in the world. All of a sudden there was a person on the telly who they could identify with. I felt some kind of pressure to make sure everything was well represented. It was too important to get wrong."

== Personal life ==
Homer is married to actress Jane Denney and they have children. He is an Arsenal F.C. supporter.

== Filmography ==
=== Film ===
Year	Film	Role	Notes
2001	Never Play With the Dead	Craig	
2009	Taylors Trophy	Mr Vinn	Short film
2018	D-Day Assassins	Officer Heinrich	
2016	Stones	Peter	
2018	Alcatraz	Sam	
2019	Bundy and the Green River Killer	Detective Richards	
2020	Break	Prison Officer Yates	
TBA	The Stranger in Our Bed	Dr. Carter	

=== Television ===
Year	Show	Role	Notes
1995–1999	EastEnders	Tony Hills	Series regular; 329 episodes
1999	All Over the Shop	Self; panellist	
2000	Silent Witness	DS Cliff Armstrong	Episode: "The World Cruise"
2003	Spine Chillers	Ashley	Episode: "Fairy Godfather"
2006	Casualty	Steve Wilson	Episode: "Born to Be Wild"
2016	Storyline	Mark	4 episodes
2017	The Dumping Ground	Kev	Episodes: "Miscreants, Robots and Bullies" and "Back in the Game".
2021	Whitstable Pearl	Craig Williams	Episode: "A Cup of Kindness"
