= List of EastEnders characters introduced in 2000 =

EastEnders logo

The following is a list of characters that first appeared in the BBC soap opera EastEnders in 2000, by order of first appearance. All characters were introduced by Matthew Robinson, or his successor, John Yorke. The first character to be introduced was Sandra di Marco (Clare Wilkie), the estranged wife of Beppe di Marco (Michael Greco). Laura Beale (Hannah Waterman), a love interest for Ian Beale (Adam Woodyatt) was introduced in February, whereas Rod Morris (Forbes Masson), the tutor of Nicky di Marco (Carly Hillman) was introduced for a guest stint. Fiona Morris (Ashley Jensen), Rod's wife, appeared in June. Barbara Owen (Sheila Hancock), Steve Owen (Martin Kemp) and Jackie Owen's (Race Davies) mother made her first appearance in July, and Jack Robbins (Chook Sibtain), Sandra's former lover, debuted in August.

The Slater family — Charlie Slater (Derek Martin), Mo Harris (Laila Morse), Lynne Slater (Elaine Lordan), Garry Hobbs (Ricky Groves), Kat Slater (Jessie Wallace), Little Mo Morgan (Kacey Ainsworth) and Zoe Slater (Michelle Ryan) were introduced in September. Kerry Skinner, the daughter of Eddie, Bex Fowler, the newborn daughter of Sonia Jackson (Natalie Cassidy) and Martin Fowler (James Alexandrou). Audrey Trueman (Corinne Skinner-Carter) and Anthony Trueman (Nicholas Bailey) were introduced in November and December respectively as the start of a new black family, the Trueman's, while Trevor Morgan (Alex Ferns), the abusive husband of Little Mo, made his first appearance in late December.

== Sandra di Marco ==
Sandra di Marco
- EastEnders character
- Portrayed by: Clare Wilkie
- Duration: 2000–2001
- First appearance: Episode 1889; 3 January 2000
- Last appearance: Episode 2084; 19 March 2001
In-universe information
- Occupation: Personal assistant
- Husband: Beppe di Marco
- Sons: Joe di Marco

Sandra di Marco, played by Clare Wilkie, is the estranged wife of Beppe di Marco (Michael Greco), and mother of his son Joe (Jake Kyprianou). She had walked out on the family when Joe was just one year old.

Sandra reappears in Beppe and Joe's lives in 2000 when she tracks them down to Walford. She had left them because Beppe's family, and in particular his grandparents Bruno and Luisa (Leon Lissek and Stella Tanner), resented her for not being Italian. Sandra wanted to go back to work after having Joe, but the family would not allow it, and when Beppe started siding with his family on the issue, Sandra decided to leave him and her son. She later moved in with Beppe's police partner, Jack Robbins (Chook Sibtain). She left Jack to track down her son, and although she is met with hostility at first, she and Beppe soon grow closer and eventually rekindle their romance, much to the disgust of Beppe's family.

Beppe is still in love with Sandra and soon begins pressurising her to have more children. The suggestion is met with hostility and she flatly refuses. Soon after, Jack arrives in Albert Square looking for Sandra. It turns out that Sandra had left Jack, following a miscarriage that left her unable to have children. Sandra tries to deny her feelings for Jack, but eventually she admits that she is still in love with him and has only reconciled with Beppe so she can get custody of her son. She and Jack reignite their romance, and Sandra makes plans to flee Walford with Jack and Joe. However, Beppe catches them just as they are about to leave and when he realises what is going on, he attacks Jack, takes Joe back and denies Sandra any access. Sandra and Jack subsequently threaten to take Beppe to court for custody of Joe. Beppe retaliates by using his police contacts to plant drugs on Jack, getting him sacked from the force. The constant rowing is having a negative effect on Joe and he finds it difficult to choose between his warring parents. This culminates in him getting hit by a car when he disobeys his father and runs across the road to be with his mother. Joe is not seriously hurt, but the accident makes his parents rethink their behaviour. Beppe eventually allows Sandra visitation rights, and so she leaves Walford with Jack.

== Laura Beale ==
Laura Beale, played by Hannah Waterman, is employed by local businessman Ian Beale (Adam Woodyatt) as a nanny for his children, Peter (Joseph Shade), Lucy (Casey Anne Rothery) and Steven Beale (Edward Savage). The two eventually become a couple, but when Laura announces that she wants a baby, Ian has a secret vasectomy. When Laura becomes pregnant, Ian throws her out, believing that the baby cannot be his. However, it is later revealed that Ian is the father of Laura's child after all. Laura was killed off on 30 April 2004 after falling down the stairs and breaking her neck, with her arch-enemy Janine Butcher (Charlie Brooks) being accused of murdering her.

== Marie Evans ==
Marie Evans
- EastEnders character
- Portrayed by: Liz Sweet
- Duration: 2000–present
- First appearance: Episode 1915; 28 February 2000
- Introduced by: Matthew Robinson
- Spin-off appearances: Tracey: A Day in the Life (2024)
In-universe information
- Occupation: Waitress; Chef

Marie Evans, played by Liz Sweet, is a named extra who has appeared in EastEnders since Episode 1915, which first aired on 28 February 2000. She is a waitress at the local café. She is first seen as a customer but later takes a job there. Marie takes care of the café when her various colleagues need to go another place. She joins the Book Club in 2010, following Tanya Branning's (Jo Joyner) departure and Jane Beale's (Laurie Brett) holiday to America. At one point, her employer Ian Beale (Adam Woodyatt) steals a home video of her giving birth to put his daughter Lucy Beale (Melissa Suffield) off having a baby.

She has most recently been seen with other named extras Winston (Ulric Browne) and Shrimpy (Ben Champniss) on 2 June 2022 when Charles, Prince of Wales and Camilla, Duchess of Cornwall visited Walford in celebrations of the Queen's Platinum Jubilee. She also attended the wedding of Sharon Watts (Letitia Dean) and Keanu Taylor (Danny Walters) on 25 December 2023.

== Rod Morris ==
Rod Morris
- EastEnders character
- Portrayed by: Forbes Masson
- First appearance: Episode 1917; 2 March 2000
- Last appearance: Episode 1980; 27 July 2000
In-universe information
- Occupation: Tutor
- Wife: Fiona Morris

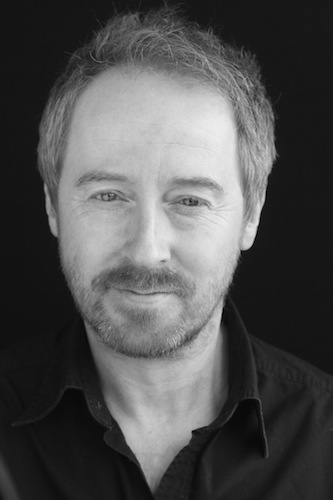
Forbes Masson portrays Rod Morris.

Rodney "Rod" Morris, played by Forbes Masson, is the tutor of Nicky di Marco (Carly Hillman) who had been contacted by her mother Rosa (Louise Jameson) to help Nicky study for her exams. Nicky becomes attracted to Rod and goes out of her way to make him notice her by doing her hair differently and wearing different outfits. On one of Rod's visits, he buys Nicky a copy of Five's album Invincible (which she had been saving up for) as a reward for her hard work. As time passes, Nicky's feelings for Rod begin to run deeper. Rod tells Nicky she has caught up enough and they can end the lessons. Nicky desperately tries to convince Rosa to have a word with Rod to get him to change his mind. Rod and his wife Fiona (Ashley Jensen) come to the di Marcos for dinner and it is obvious to Fiona that Nicky has a crush on her husband.

Nicky finally makes a move on her tutor and he initially reciprocates, but then takes things too far and sexually assaults her. Nicky is found in tears by Rosa and her brother, Gianni (Marc Bannerman) stating that Rod had attacked her. Rod is then arrested, questioned and later bailed. Rod is attacked by a drunken Gianni who has come to avenge his sister. Gianni is then subsequently arrested and charged with GBH and drink-driving. Nicky later admits she was the one that kissed Rod and he reciprocated. The result is Rod admitting to not being able to control himself, and escaping a 15-year prison sentence.

== Fiona Morris ==
Fiona Morris
- EastEnders character
- Portrayed by: Ashley Jensen
- First appearance: Episode 1962; 16 June 2000
- Last appearance: Episode 1973; 11 July 2000
In-universe information
- Husband: Rod Morris

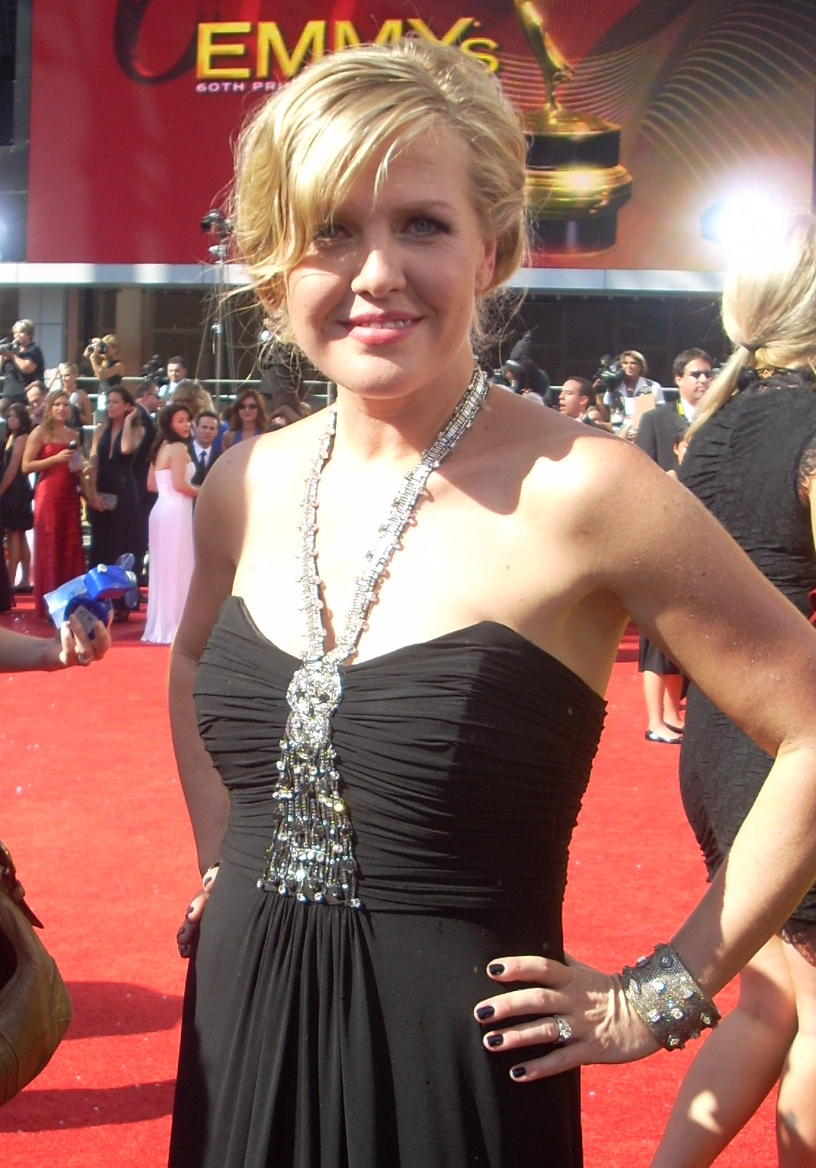
Scottish actress Ashley Jensen, who played Fiona Morris.

Fiona Morris, played by Ashley Jensen, appears in five episodes, first broadcast in June 2000. She is the wife of Rod Morris (Forbes Masson).

Fiona first appears when her and Rod come to the di Marco's for dinner. She notices that Rod's pupil, Nicky di Marco (Carly Hillman), has a crush on him. She is seen again when Nicky's brother, Gianni di Marco (Marc Bannerman), comes to the Morrises' home and attacks Rod, whom Nicky has accused of sexually assaulting her. Fiona tries to fend Gianni off but is shoved to the floor in the process.

Several days later, Fiona appears in Albert Square and corners Nicky in an attempt to get her to drop her case against Rod, but is interrupted when a journalist enters the scene to ask Nicky about the events, prompting her to flee. Later, Nicky, Gianni and their mother, Rosa di Marco (Louise Jameson), arrive to confront Fiona after she labels Nicky a "tart"; the pair begin arguing and Fiona states that Nicky has been flirting with Rod for weeks and that Rod has been a teacher for the past 11 years and has never behaved inappropriately towards a student.

== Barbara Owen ==
Barbara Owen
- EastEnders character
- Portrayed by: Sheila Hancock
- Duration: 2000–2001
- First appearance: Episode 1971; 6 July 2000
- Last appearance: Episode 2139; 24 July 2001
In-universe information
- Husband: Richard Owen (backstory)
- Sons: Steve Owen
- Daughters: Jackie Owen
- Grandsons: Hunter Owen

Barbara Owen, played by Sheila Hancock, is introduced as the mother of Steve Owen (Martin Kemp) and Jackie Owen (Race Davies). She first appears in July 2000 and appears again in March 2001, before making her final appearance in July 2001.

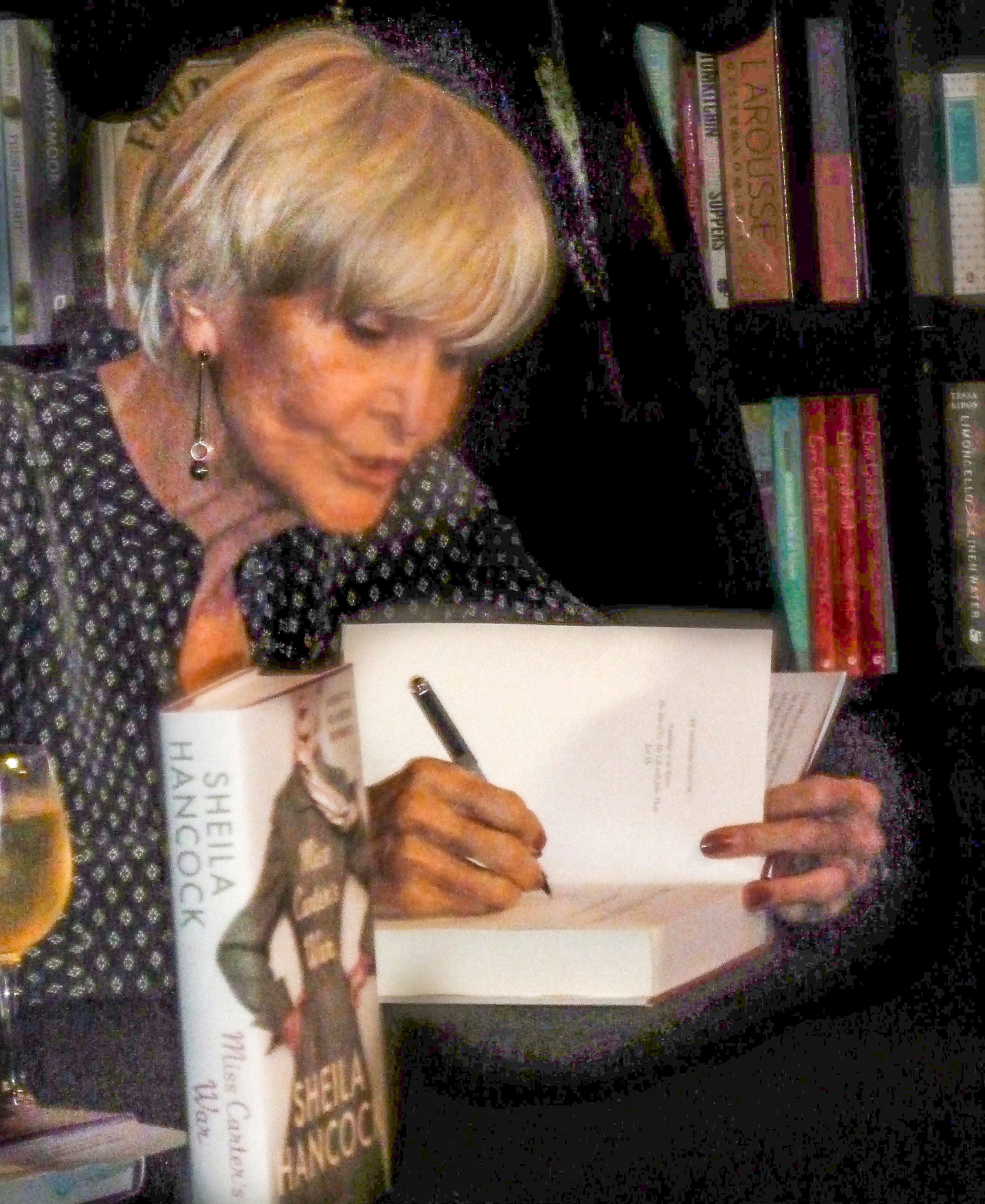
Actress Sheila Hancock (pictured in 2014) appeared across three guest stints as Barbara Owen.

Barbara first appears when Steve, who is going through a drugs problem, visits her after discovering that she has terminal heart disease. Barbara is obsessed with the British royal family, though not so caring about her own children. Eight months later, Barbara attends Steve's wedding to Mel Healy (Tamzin Outhwaite), taking a shine to his nemesis Phil Mitchell (Steve McFadden), to the point of putting his photograph on her fireplace mantel.

Four months later, Steve visits Barbara when she is in a critical condition and confronts her about the abuse she'd showered on him when he was a child. She tries to defend her actions by saying her husband, Richard left her to bring up two children with no money. She refuses to let Steve call an ambulance and asks him to kiss her. He gives her a peck on the forehead but she asks for a kiss on the lips. When he leans forward, she grabs him and gives him an extremely passionate kiss, telling him he is an attractive man. Steve is disgusted and leaves. Barbara dies soon after. Mel is the only person in attendance at Barbara's funeral, while Steve is having sex with another woman.

When Steve dies in a car explosion eight months after Barbara's death, his ashes are dumped on Barbara's grave by Phil. Seventeen years after Barbara's death, Mel returns to Walford with her and Steve's son, Hunter Owen (Charlie Winter), who learns that Steve was a villain. Mel finds Hunter at Barbara's grave and she blames Barbara for the way Steve was, describing her as an "evil witch".

== Jack Robbins ==
Jack Robbins
- EastEnders character
- Portrayed by: Chook Sibtain
- Duration: 2000–2001
- First appearance: Episode 1990; 21 August 2000
- Last appearance: Episode 2084; 19 March 2001
In-universe information
- Occupation: Police officer

Jack Robbins, played by Chook Sibtain, is a former police colleague of Beppe di Marco (Michael Greco) and a former lover of Beppe's wife, Sandra (Clare Wilkie). Jack arrives in Albert Square to try to win Sandra back but she is insistent that she loves Beppe, having reconciled with him several months earlier. It turns out that Sandra had left Jack following a miscarriage that left her unable to have children.

Sandra tries to deny her feelings for Jack, but eventually she admits that she is still in love with him and has only reconciled with Beppe so she can get custody of her son, Joe (Jake Kyprianou). She and Jack reignite their romance and Sandra makes plans to flee Walford with Jack and Joe. However, Beppe catches them just as they are about to leave and when he realises what is going on he attacks Jack, takes Joe back and denies Sandra any access. Sandra and Jack subsequently threaten to take Beppe to court for custody of Joe. Beppe retaliates by using his police contacts to plant drugs on Jack, getting him sacked from the force. Jack later reveals that the charges did not stick. Beppe eventually allows Sandra visitation rights and so Jack and her leave Walford in March 2001.

== Charlie Slater ==
Charlie Slater, played by Derek Martin, arrives in Walford with his mother-in-law Mo Harris (Laila Morse), daughters Lynne (Elaine Lordan), Kat (Jessie Wallace), Little Mo (Kacey Ainsworth), and Zoe (Michelle Ryan), plus Lynne's boyfriend, Garry Hobbs (Ricky Groves). "An easy-going family man", Charlie has also been described as the "rock that keeps the Slater family together". In 2010, the character was axed by new executive producer Bryan Kirkwood as part of a plan to "breathe new life into the show". Charlie made guest returns in 2011 and 2013, before making a final guest stint in January 2016, when the character was killed off after suffering a heart attack.

== Mo Harris ==
Mo Harris, played by Laila Morse, moves to Albert Square with her son-in-law Charlie Slater (Derek Martin) and granddaughters Lynne (Elaine Lordan), Kat (Jessie Wallace), Little Mo (Kacey Ainsworth) and Zoe (Michelle Ryan). She has an instant rivalry with Pat Evans (Pam St Clement), with whom she used to be friends many years ago. Indeed, Mo was at one time married to Pat's brother. Much of Mo's time is spent selling stolen goods, which are normally of poor quality, and she often trades with a man known as "Fat Elvis". Mo departs in January 2016 and returns in March 2018.

== Lynne Hobbs ==
Lynne Hobbs, played by Elaine Lordan, is the eldest daughter of Charlie Slater (Derek Martin). She arrives in Albert Square with the rest of her family. Lynne is in a relationship with Garry Hobbs (Ricky Groves) and she spends much of her time despairing over Garry's inability to fully commit to their relationship. Eventually Garry agrees to marry Lynne, but on the eve of her wedding she has sex with Beppe di Marco (Michael Greco). The marriage goes ahead anyway, but it is not long before Lynne embarks on another affair. She departed on 2 July 2004.

== Garry Hobbs ==
Garry Hobbs, played by Ricky Groves, comes to Walford with his girlfriend Lynne Slater (Elaine Lordan) and her family. He is initially reluctant to commit to Lynne, but the pair do eventually marry. The marriage is volatile however, and Lynne leaves Garry in 2004 which leads to Garry to attempting suicide. He manages to recover with the help of his friend, Minty Peterson (Cliff Parisi), and develops a romantic interest in Dawn Swann (Kara Tointon). Garry and Dawn left the show together on 27 August 2009.

== Kat Slater ==
Kat Slater, played by Jessie Wallace, is the daughter of Charlie Slater (Derek Martin), and arrives with her sisters Lynne (Elaine Lordan) and Little Mo (Kacey Ainsworth), and grandmother Mo Harris (Laila Morse). Her daughter Zoe Slater (Michelle Ryan) is initially believed to be her sister until Kat reveals she was raped by her uncle Harry Slater (Michael Elphick) as a child. She later marries Alfie Moon (Shane Richie). She appears in the show from September 2000 to December 2005, and returns in September 2010. After departing in May 2015, Kat and Alfie returned again in December, before leaving in January 2016, commencing their own spin-off series, Redwater. In March 2018, Wallace reprised her role as Kat.

== Little Mo Mitchell ==
Little Mo Mitchell, played by Kacey Ainsworth, is the daughter of Charlie Slater (Derek Martin), and arrives with her sisters Lynne (Elaine Lordan), Kat (Jessie Wallace) and Zoe (Michelle Ryan), and grandmother Mo Harris (Laila Morse). Little Mo is married to Trevor Morgan (Alex Ferns), and though she loves him, Trevor's severe mood swings and physical and emotional violence ruins their marriage. Trevor dies in a house fire, and Little Mo eventually marries Billy Mitchell (Perry Fenwick). However their marriage is ruined when Little Mo is raped by Graham Foster (Alex McSweeney). Little Mo appeared regularly until 26 May 2006.

== Zoe Slater ==
Zoe Slater, played by Michelle Ryan, is the presumed youngest daughter of Charlie Slater (Derek Martin). It is later revealed that one of Charlie's other daughters, Kat (Jessie Wallace) was raped by her uncle Harry Slater (Michael Elphick), making Kat Zoe's mother, and Charlie her uncle and grandfather. Zoe becomes romantically involved with Dennis Rickman (Nigel Harman), but when Zoe lies that she is pregnant, to keep Dennis, a tragic turn of events lead to Zoe being implicated in the murder of Den Watts (Leslie Grantham), the father of Dennis, alongside Chrissie Watts (Tracy-Ann Oberman) and Sam Mitchell (Kim Medcalf). Zoe left the serial on 24 June 2005.

== Eddie Skinner ==
Eddie Skinner
- EastEnders character
- Portrayed by: Richard Vanstone
- Duration: 2000–2001
- First appearance: Episode 2003; 18 September 2000
- Last appearance: Episode 2071; 15 February 2001
In-universe information
- Wife: Cheryl Skinner (backstory)
- Daughters: Kerry Skinner
- Uncles: William Skinner

Eddie Skinner, played by Richard Vanstone, arrives in Walford on 18 September 2000 on the day of his aunt Ethel Skinner's (Gretchen Franklin) funeral and later begins lodging with the Fowlers at number 45, along with his daughter, Kerry (Gemma McCluskie). Eddie was born and bred in Walford, and knows many of the current residents, such as Pat Evans (Pam St Clement), Mo Harris (Laila Morse), Pauline Fowler (Wendy Richard) and Dot Cotton (June Brown) from his youth. He also knew Den Watts (Leslie Grantham), Pete Beale (Peter Dean), Arthur Fowler (Bill Treacher), Angie Watts (Anita Dobson) and Kathy Beale (Gillian Taylforth) from his time at Walford. He had left Walford in 1970.

Eddie begins working on Mark Fowler's (Todd Carty) stall and later develops a crush on Mark's mother Pauline, but it is not reciprocated. It is revealed that Nick Cotton (John Altman) had spent some time in prison with Eddie and blackmails Eddie for regular payments or he will reveal this to Pauline, but Eddie tells her first. Eddie later leaves the Square, his whereabouts are currently unknown.

== Kerry Skinner ==
Kerry Skinner
- EastEnders character
- Portrayed by: Gemma McCluskie
- Duration: 2000–2001
- First appearance: Episode 2017; 19 October 2000
- Last appearance: Episode 2080; 8 March 2001
In-universe information
- Father: Eddie Skinner
- Mother: Cheryl Skinner
- Other relatives: Ethel Skinner

Kerry Skinner, played by Gemma McCluskie, arrives in Walford on 19 October 2000, as the daughter of Eddie Skinner (Richard Vanstone) and the great niece of the recently deceased Ethel Skinner (Gretchen Franklin). She is also friends of Zoe Slater (Michelle Ryan). Kerry briefly dates Robbie Jackson (Dean Gaffney) and gets him to propose to her. However, things do not work out, as it turns out that Kerry had got engaged to another man, Darren (Stephen Hoyle), while she was on holiday. She leaves the square in March 2001.

== Bex Fowler ==
Rebecca "Bex" Fowler (also Chloe Jackson and Rebecca Miller) is the daughter of Martin Fowler (James Alexandrou/James Bye) and Sonia Jackson (Natalie Cassidy). She appears from her birth in 2000 until 2002, played by Alex and Vicky Gonzalez, and returns from 2005, played by Jade Sharif, before departing with her on-screen parents in 2007. Coinciding with Sonia and Martin's reintroductions, the character returned in a regular capacity from 2014, recast again to Jasmine Armfield, and became central among the series' teenage characters over the subsequent years.

Rebecca returned on 15 January 2014, now portrayed by Armfield, when Carol Jackson (Lindsey Coulson) tells Sonia about her breast cancer diagnosis.

== Audrey Trueman ==
Audrey Trueman
- EastEnders character
- Portrayed by: Corinne Skinner-Carter
- Duration: 2000–2001
- First appearance: Episode 2030; 14 November 2000
- Last appearance: Episode 2162; 6 September 2001
In-universe information
- Occupation: B&B owner
- Sisters: Julia
- Husband: Patrick Trueman (until 2001)
- Sons: Paul Trueman; Anthony Trueman
- Grandsons: Josh Goodwin; Euan Trueman
- Granddaughters: Jasmine Fisher; Eleanor Trueman

Audrey Trueman, played by Corinne Skinner-Carter, is the mother of Anthony (Nicholas Bailey) and Paul Trueman (Gary Beadle) and is later revealed to be the ex-wife of Patrick Trueman (Rudolph Walker).

Audrey was introduced by executive producer John Yorke as the matriarch of a new black family moving to Walford in November 2000. Portrayed as a "busy body", Audrey was axed in September 2001. Actress Corinne Skinner-Carter revealed in 2008 that she believes Audrey was axed because of creative differences she had with the writers about Audrey's backstory: "I received a script and it was all about how Audrey's first job in England had been as a lavatory cleaner, how she had worked her way up from that to become a B&B owner. I didn't think it was appropriate and I told them so – she may have come from the bottom but not from the bottom of a toilet!". Although the toilet cleaner reference was dropped, shortly after Skinner-Carter was informed about "a fantastic development in the script – Audrey was going to be killed off." Audrey died of a brain haemorrhage in September 2001.

Audrey moves to Walford in 2000, taking over the bed and breakfast, where she lives with her son Anthony. A religious woman, she becomes deeply involved with his life, whilst ignoring her other son, tearaway Paul. She disapproves of Anthony dating Kat Slater (Jessie Wallace) and tries to interfere many times, leading to Anthony rebelling against his mother. Audrey's main reason for ignoring Paul is, that in the past, Paul and Anthony had been in a car accident that had crippled a young girl. Anthony was drunk at the time and was driving but Paul took the blame and went to prison. Audrey is unaware of this and continues to ignore Paul despite his attempts at making her notice him.

In September 2001, Audrey suffers a blow to the head accidentally after being struck by debris from Sharon Watts renevation on the Queen Vic living quarters whilst walking past said public house. Several days later, after an argument with Paul during which he reveals that Anthony was the one who was driving at the time of the accident, Audrey collapses and suffers a severe headache, caused by a delayed reaction to the blow she received earlier.

Just before she dies, Audrey tells Paul that she knew about Anthony being the driver and tells Paul to tell Anthony that she loves him and Paul says "What about me?". Just as Audrey is about to say something to him she dies. However, everything is left to Paul in Audrey's will. Audrey's ex-husband Patrick (Rudolph Walker) arrives in Walford for her funeral. It is subsequently revealed that he and Audrey married in a shotgun wedding, after Audrey became pregnant with Paul. Patrick left shortly after Anthony's birth in the early 1970s. The Truemans later discover that despite Audrey's claims, Paul is not actually Patrick's son; he is the biological child of Milton Hibbert (Jeffery Kissoon), Patrick's friend with whom Audrey had been having an affair.

== Anthony Trueman ==
Anthony Trueman, played by Nicholas Bailey, is the son of Audrey Trueman (Corinne Skinner-Carter), and the brother of Paul Trueman (Gary Beadle). Later, his father is revealed to be Patrick Trueman (Rudolph Walker). Anthony gets engaged to Zoe Slater (Michelle Ryan), however the relationship falls apart when Anthony realises he still loves Zoe's mother, Kat Slater (Jessie Wallace), who he has dated previously.

== Trevor Morgan ==
Trevor Morgan, played by Alex Ferns, is the abusive husband of Little Mo Slater (Kacey Ainsworth). His severe mood swings and physical and emotional violence ruin their marriage. Once during one of his violent outbursts, Little Mo hits Trevor over the head with an iron in self-defence, knocking him unconscious. Trevor reports Little Mo to the police and has her charged with attempted murder. Trevor was killed off in a house explosion on 1 November 2002, ending his reign of terror over Little Mo.

== Other characters ==
Character	Date(s)	Actor	Circumstances
Ralph Clemens	31 January – 1 February	Nick Lumley	A man who wants to buy Terry (Gavin Richards) and Irene Raymond's (Roberta Taylor) recently purchased Triumph car. Terry originally refuses to sell it for £1250, but Ralph then buys the car for £2500.
Will Harper	31 January – 1 February	Douglas Fielding	A private investigator hired by Steve Owen (Martin Kemp) to find out who is terrorising him by slashing his tyres, covering his flat in red paint and vandalising his nightclub, e20. The culprit turns out to be Matthew Rose (Joe Absolom), but he gets to Steve before Harper figures this out.
Sophie Braddock	17 February-18 September	Hayley Angel Wardle	A girl who attends Walford High School with Sonia Jackson (Natalie Cassidy), Nicky di Marco (Carly Hillman) and Jamie Mitchell (Jack Ryder). Sonia is jealous of her and nicknames her "Braddock the Haddock". Jamie asks her out on a date, much to the annoyance of Sonia. The date goes well, and Jamie is shocked when Sophie has sex with him in his godfather Phil Mitchell's (Steve McFadden) bed.
Maureen Carter	4 May-1 June	Diana Coupland	The aunt of Irene Raymond (Roberta Taylor), who arrives in Walford visiting Irene and her husband Terry (Gavin Richards). She is unpopular with Terry, and outstays her welcome. Whilst she is living in Albert Square, she tries to seduce Jim Branning (John Bardon), much to his annoyance. One night during a party at The Queen Victoria public house, Maureen wants to treat Jim for a night of fun, and starts to approach him. When Jim sees her, he quickly grabs Dot Cotton (June Brown) and kisses her. Dot slaps Jim, but after Maureen sees them kissing, she quickly leaves Walford.
Mr Hargrove	27 July	Unknown	An insurance assessor who Terry Raymond (Gavin Richards) invites to the First Til Last shop to assess the amount of money he will be able to claim.
Danny Harrison	12 September-11 December	Eddie Osei	A building contractor who works on Beale's Homes, converting a school into flats for Ian Beale (Adam Woodyatt). He is upset when Ian goes behind his back and chooses to use another building contractor. Ian refuses to pay Danny, so he spreads rumours of Ian's financial situation, which eventually reaches the new builders working on the development, causing a workers' strike. When Ian does not pay Danny, he is eventually declared bankrupt.
Adam Cherry	18 September	Michael Fenton Stevens	The vicar who conducts Ethel Skinner's (Gretchen Franklin) funeral.
Kevin	19 September-10 October	Daniel Mays	The ex-boyfriend of Kat Slater (Jessie Wallace), who appears unexpectedly to find Kat after Mel Owen (Tamzin Outhwaite) tells him where Kat and her family live. Kat and Kevin have a row with the neighbours watching, but are interrupted when Kat's grandmother Mo Harris (Laila Morse) soaks him with water and Kat's father Charlie Slater (Derek Martin) takes him home in his cab. He returns on 25 September, when he calls in the middle of the night. Mo soaks him with water again. He returns to number 23 and asks Charlie where Kat is. He goes to The Queen Victoria public house and finds Kat and her family dancing. He tries to win Kat back but she rejects him. He returns again and Mo tells him Kat is not in the house. Kevin is convinced that Mo is lying and chains himself to the gate outside. Kevin escapes and Kat tells him to back off. He is not seen again.
James Stocksbridge	21 September	Peter Hamilton-Dyer	Ian Beale's (Adam Woodyatt) solicitor when he is declared bankrupt. He also mentions to Sandra di Marco (Clare Wilkie) that he had worked with Ian to win custody of his children, Steven, Peter, and Lucy, as Sandra wants to gain custody of her son Joe (Jake Kyprianou) from her ex-husband Beppe (Michael Greco).
Ameena Badawi	30 October-14 December	Shobna Gulati	Sonia Jackson's (Natalie Cassidy) social worker. When Sonia gives birth to a daughter after not realising she is pregnant, Sonia is taken to hospital and tells Ameena upon meeting her that she does not want her baby. She names her baby Chloe Jackson and Ameena tries to persuade Sonia to tell her mother Carol (Lindsey Coulson) that she has had a baby. Sonia decides she wants Chloe adopted. Sonia hands Chloe over to Ameena, who takes Chloe into foster care. Ameena is later promoted, and Sonia's case is taken over by Diane Irving.
John Charrington	13 November – 14 December	Jeremy Gittins	Ian Beale's (Adam Woodyatt) accountant. He advises Ian not to invest in the construction of flats in Walford, a piece of advice Ian ignores, which leads to him eventually being declared bankrupt.
Helen Graham	16 November	Daisy Beaumont	An employee of the housing association interested in buying the flats Ian Beale (Adam Woodyatt) is having built, until he is declared bankrupt.
