= List of EastEnders characters introduced in 2002 =

EastEnders logo

The following is a list of characters that first appeared in the BBC soap opera EastEnders in 2002, by order of first appearance. Many were introduced by the show's executive producer, John Yorke.

== Jack Evans ==
Jack Evans
- EastEnders character
- Portrayed by: Brodie and Riordan O'Sullivan
- Duration: 2002–2004
- First appearance: Episode 2236; 11 January 2002
- Last appearance: Episode 2726; 10 May 2004
In-universe information
- Father: Barry Evans
- Mother: Natalie Evans
- Stepmother: Janine Butcher
- Grandfathers: Roy Evans
- Grandmothers: Andrea Price
- Uncles: Nathan Williams; Jack Price; Kevin Price
- Aunts: Susie Price

Jack Evans, played by the identical twins Brodie O'Sullivan and Riordan O'Sullivan, is the son of Barry (Shaun Williamson) and Natalie Evans (Lucy Speed). He has a traumatic breech birth early in 2002. He is named after Natalie's younger brother. Jack initially lives with his parents, his grandfather Roy (Tony Caunter) and Roy's wife Pat (Pam St Clement), but moves out of Albert Square in March 2003 following his parents' divorce and Roy's death. Barry is devoted to Jack and agonises over the fact that he cannot be a full-time father to him.

Barry dies early in 2004 and as he had just married Janine Butcher (Charlie Brooks), she inherits Barry's estate. When Natalie suspects Janine is responsible for Barry's death, she leaves Walford for a new start with Jack. Before they leave, Natalie and Jack plant a tree in the Square in Barry's name. Jack's last appearance is in May 2004.

== Minty Peterson ==
Rick Peterson (better known as Minty), played by Cliff Parisi, He makes his first appearance on 11 March 2002. Minty's friend, Phil Mitchell (Steve McFadden), to look after his sister, Sam (Kim Medcalf). Minty becomes friends with fellow mechanic Garry Hobbs (Ricky Groves), but their friendship is tested when Minty dates Gary's mother, Hazel (Kika Mirylees). Hazel leaves Minty, however, and he goes on to have a relationship with Phil's old girlfriend, Manda Best (Josie Lawrence). However, Sam (now played by Danniella Westbrook) reappears in Walford, and this leads to Minty admitting to Manda that he still has feelings for Sam. However, Sam leaves Walford again, and Minty decides to quit Walford himself in September 2010.

== Tom Banks ==
Tom Banks, played by Colm Ó Maonlaí, is a firefighter who had been friends with Sharon Watts (Letitia Dean) when they were young. When he reappears in Walford in 2002, they become close again. The couple begin dating, and despite interference from Sharon's ex-boyfriend Phil Mitchell (Steve McFadden) and Tom's psychotic ex-wife Sadie (Isobel Middleton), they stay together. However, things take a turn for the worse when Tom discovers he has a brain tumour.

== Sean Andrews ==
Sean Andrews
- EastEnders character
- Portrayed by: Oliver Bradley
- First appearance: Episode 2313; 27 May 2002
- Last appearance: Episode 2406; 5 November 2002
In-universe information
- Father: Trevor Morgan
- Mother: Donna Andrews
- Stepmother: Little Mo Mitchell

Sean Andrews, played by Oliver Bradley, is the son of Trevor Morgan (Alex Ferns) and Donna Andrews (Paula Jennings), born on 31 August 2001. Sean is the product of his parents' extra-marital affair. Donna was originally Trevor's mistress.

Sean is first mentioned by Trevor's wife Little Mo Morgan (Kacey Ainsworth), who urges Trevor to be a part of Sean's life despite his abusing both her and Donna in the past. Donna then flees to the Slaters' house to hide from Trevor who is on a violent rampage but is eventually found and leaves Sean with Mo Harris (Laila Morse). Trevor bursts into the house and the police are called. A violent Trevor demands to see his son but Kat Slater (Jessie Wallace) fights off Trevor, letting him beat her to prevent him going out the back where Sean is being kept and to stall for the police's arrival. The police arrive and arrest Trevor and Donna takes Sean home. In November 2002, Sean is kidnapped from Donna's house by Trevor. Trevor starts abusing Little Mo but she stands up to him and says she is not frightened of him. He threatens to start a fire but Little Mo shows little interest and goes to get Sean and leave but Trevor grabs Little Mo, causing her to drop the lit match, and starts a house fire at Little Mo's home. Local fireman Tom Banks (Colm Ó Maonlaí) saves Sean and Little Mo, but dies when going back to save Trevor, who also dies. Donna and Sean leave shortly afterwards.

== Gus Smith ==
Gus Smith, played by Mohammed George, debuted in 2002. He soon begins a relationship with Sonia Jackson (Natalie Cassidy). However, Sonia breaks up with him to reconcile with her previous boyfriend, Jamie Mitchell (Jack Ryder), though Gus continues to have feelings for Sonia for a long time. Gus is joined in Walford by his troublesome brother Juley (Joseph Kpobie), and also takes custody of Robbie Jackson's (Dean Gaffney) dog, Wellard.

== Precious Hudson ==
Precious Hudson
- EastEnders character
- Portrayed by: Judi Shekoni
- First appearance: Episode 2322; 11 June 2002
- Last appearance: Episode 2344; 19 July 2002
In-universe information
- Mother: Estella Hulton
- Husband: Angel Hudson

Marjorie "Precious" Hudson (also Hulton), played by Judi Shekoni, is the glamorous wife of gangster Angel Hudson (Goldie) and she is first seen in Walford in June 2002 when Angel forces his old associate, Paul Trueman (Gary Beadle), to keep a watchful eye over her. It turns out that Precious is Angel's fake alibi in a murder trial and fearing that she might skip town or be harmed before she can testify, he arranges for Precious to move in with the Trueman's and instructs Paul not to let her out of his sight.

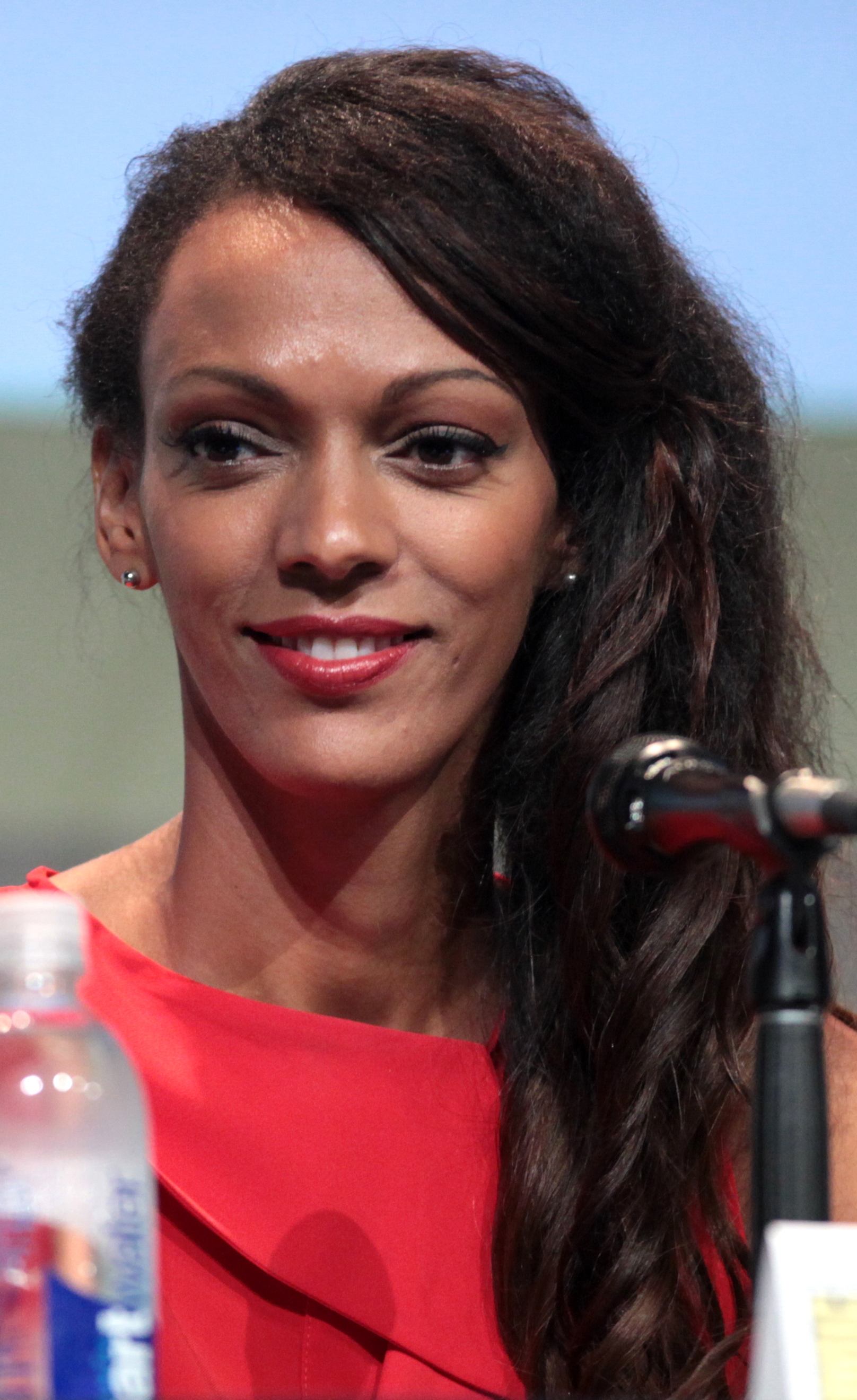
Judi Shekoni portrayed Precious Hudson across multiple episodes in 2002.

Initially Paul is unaware of the fact that Precious is Angel's wife, and so when she makes her amorous intentions towards him clear, he has no qualms whatsoever about having sex with her. When she finally tells him the truth, he is horrified, and petrified of what Angel will do should he discover what had occurred between them. Precious reassures him that their marriage is a sham and promises not to divulge the affair. However, later that night, whilst Paul goes to get a take-away for them, Precious packs her bags and leaves. Paul is frantic, particularly when Angel shows up looking for her. Paul feeds Angel a story and he along with his brother, Anthony (Nicholas Bailey), goes in search of Precious, leaving Angel home alone with their father, Patrick (Rudolph Walker). Paul eventually finds Precious at her mother Estella's (Ellen Thomas) hair salon, and desperately tries to persuade her to return, but she refuses and flees in a taxi. Paul returns home to discover his father bound and gagged by Angel, who is also holding Anthony's girlfriend, Zoe (Michelle Ryan), hostage. Angel attacks Paul, just as Precious walks in the door. She has changed her mind about returning because she loves Paul.

A few days later some shady characters are seen placing a bomb underneath Precious' car—timed to go off half an hour before she is due to be at the solicitor with Angel. However, Precious had put her car into the local mechanics for a service and when it explodes only Garry Hobbs (Ricky Groves) is hurt but his injuries are not serious. Precious is furious that her life is under threat and she tells Angel she will lie for him in the trial but only if he gives her a divorce. Soon after Precious is kidnapped by the father of the man Angel murdered. He convinces Precious that the only way to get rid of Angel is to get him locked up. Precious realises that Angel will never divorce her and would rather see her dead, so she decides to tell the truth at the trial the following day, but to her horror Angel is found not guilty anyway.

Paul and Precious then decide to flee Walford for Spain. However, an altercation at The Queen Victoria public house between the Truemans and the Slaters stalls their departure and after Paul gets into a fight with Garry he is taken away by the police. Meanwhile, Precious, who is waiting for Paul is caught by Angel.

Precious tells Angel she is in love with Paul and wants a divorce. Surprisingly Angel is not bothered and he tells Precious that he does not care enough about her betrayal to kill her and that she can have her divorce. Paul is a different matter, however. He promises that if he ever finds out that she and Paul are together, he will kill him. To protect Paul, Precious is forced to lie. She tells him she is not in love with him and says she is just using him as an escape from Angel. After which she leaves Walford, leaving Paul with a broken heart.

== Juley Smith ==
Juley Smith
- EastEnders character
- Portrayed by: Joseph Kpobie
- Duration: 2002–2006
- First appearance: Episode 2349; 29 July 2002
- Last appearance: Episode 3194; 27 July 2006
- Created by: Louise Berridge
In-universe information
- Occupation: Waiter
- Mother: Pearl Smith
- Half-brothers: Gus Smith; Mikey Smith
- Aunts: Opal Smith

Julius "Juley" Smith, played by Joseph Kpobie, first appears in July 2002 as Gus Smith's (Mohammed George) brother. He proves to be a problem for Gus, as he gets involved in crime, including firearm possession and the theft of charity money, which leads to his departure in April 2005. In September 2005 he returns and visits France with Gus, Minty Peterson (Cliff Parisi), Garry Hobbs (Ricky Groves) and Mickey Miller (Joe Swash). Mickey's father Mike Swann (Mark Wingett) sees straight through him and exposes him as a con-man. He returns to Walford and promises to change.

Juley then has a romance with Ruby Allen (Louisa Lytton). Their crush starts on 21 November 2005; however, they really push the limits on 12 December 2005 when they have sex together, despite watchful eye of Ruby's father, Johnny Allen (Billy Murray). The couple do not seem to care about what Johnny thinks, but Juley has a near-fatal encounter with Johnny on 15 December 2005 when Johnny ambushes him with a pair of kitchen scissors, with the intent to harm him. Juley is only saved when Dennis Rickman (Nigel Harman) intervenes. It is subsequently revealed that Juley is working for Phil Mitchell (Steve McFadden), who is paying him to be with Ruby to antagonise Johnny. Ruby later moves in with Juley.

Juley starts to fall in love with Ruby and decides to call it off with Phil, who orders Juley to give back all the money he has been paid. Juley had put some of the money into his brother Gus's fund to see his dog, Wellard, who has been arrested for biting Ian Beale (Adam Woodyatt). Gus catches Juley with the money, and forces Juley into confessing about his working for Phil. In January 2006, Phil wants Juley to end his relationship with Ruby, saying if Juley does not end it, he will tell Johnny the truth and Johnny will most likely kill Juley. Juley breaks up with Ruby in the harshest way he can, despite his true feelings. Johnny is released from hospital and finds out about Phil paying Juley. Johnny threatens to kill Juley if he ever goes near Ruby again. Realising he is making a mistake Juley attempts to get Ruby back, and she eventually agrees to try again. However, she realises that she cannot trust him when she finds herself questioning his phone calls. When Ruby returns to Walford after her father's arrest, Juley talks to her in the market to see if she is okay, but is badly beaten by Johnny's employee, Jake Moon (Joel Beckett).

In July 2006 Juley mugs Ruby and hits her, leaving her with a minor injury. He then steals £2000 from her which she was going to use for her holiday with her best friend, Stacey Slater (Lacey Turner). Ruby enters Scarlet nightclub to put the £2000 in a safe but when she is leaving the office, Juley creeps into the nightclub. Ruby is about to leave the club when she hears a noise coming from the office. This is where she finds Juley with the money and he runs away, pushing her onto the floor. The next day, Juley's brother Gus discovers the £2000 in Juley's bedroom. He alerts Juley that he knows what is going on and then tries to deliver the money through the postbox of Scarlet, but Jake is watching. He calls Gus inside the club to discuss what is going on. Gus lies, but then confesses to Jake that it is Juley who stole the money. Jake then orders Gus to find Juley and bring him to the club, otherwise he will report Juley to the police. Gus returns to the flat and tells Juley what Jake is planning to do to him. Jake closely follows Gus and demands Juley to open the door. Juley and Gus then hug and squeeze hands, which is followed by Juley escaping the flat by the back door, and then leaving Walford. His last appearance is on 27 July 2006.

== Milton Hibbert ==
Milton Hibbert
- EastEnders character
- Portrayed by: Jeffery Kissoon
- First appearance: Episode 2356; 9 August 2002
- Last appearance: Episode 2358; 13 August 2002
In-universe information
- Sons: Paul Trueman
- Daughters: Rebecca Hibbert
- Granddaughters: Eleanor Trueman

Milton Hibbert, played by Jeffery Kissoon, is an old friend of Patrick Trueman (Rudolph Walker), who had grown up in Trinidad with him and his late wife Audrey (Corinne Skinner-Carter). Milton has arrived in the square for Patrick's son Anthony's (Nicholas Bailey) wedding to Zoe Slater (Michelle Ryan). Paul (Gary Beadle), Anthony's brother has suspicions of Patrick not being their father and Anthony secretly takes blood from Patrick and Paul.

After the tests prove Patrick and Paul not to be father and son, Anthony sees a close resemblance between Milton and Paul. Milton's daughter Rebecca (Paulette Williams) later meets with Paul in The Queen Victoria and they began to hit off, before they have the opportunity to have sex together, Anthony stops them and reveals the truth: Milton is Paul's father. After a heated Argument with Patrick, Milton is promptly thrown out and not seen again.

== Joanne Ryan ==
Joanne Ryan
- EastEnders character
- Portrayed by: Tara Lynne O'Neill
- Duration: 2002–2003
- First appearance: Episode 2380; 20 September 2002
- Last appearance: Episode 2573; 21 August 2003
In-universe information
- Occupation: Nanny

Joanne Ryan, played by Tara Lynne O'Neill, is hired by Peggy Mitchell (Barbara Windsor) as a nanny to care for her granddaughter, baby Louise Mitchell, much to Louise's mother Lisa Fowler's (Lucy Benjamin) dismay. Joanne is attracted to Louise's father Phil Mitchell (Steve McFadden) and is sacked when she tries to seduce him. Joanne also has a fling with the newly arrived Dennis Rickman (Nigel Harman). After being rejected, Joanne gets her revenge on Phil by renting his house to Albert Square's new doctor, Jonathan Leroy (Ivan Kaye) and his wife. After this she leaves Walford and has not been seen since.

== Clive Mitchell ==
Clive Mitchell
- EastEnders character
- Portrayed by: Tony Selby
- First appearance: Episode 2387; 3 October 2002
- Last appearance: Episode 2388; 4 October 2002
In-universe information
- Family: Mitchell
- Father: Phillip Mitchell
- Mother: Sandra Mitchell
- Brothers: Eric Mitchell; Archie Mitchell
- Wife: Elaine Mitchell
- Sons: Charlie Mitchell; Harry Mitchell
- Grandfathers: Edward Mitchell
- Grandmothers: Betty Mitchell
- Uncles: Kenneth Mitchell
- Aunts: Madge Mitchell
- Nephews: Phil Mitchell; Grant Mitchell
- Nieces: Sam Mitchell; Ronnie Mitchell; Roxy Mitchell
- First cousins: Ted Mitchell; Stevie Mitchell
- Other relatives: Ben Mitchell; Louise Mitchell; Courtney Mitchell; Mark Fowler Jr; Ricky Branning; Lexi Pearce; Peggy Taylor; Charli Slater; Danielle Jones; James Branning; Matthew Mitchell Cotton; Amy Mitchell; Billy Mitchell; Will Mitchell; Janet Mitchell; Lola Pearce

Clive Mitchell, portrayed by Tony Selby, was introduced as part of the Mitchell family. When Clive appeared, he was credited as Uncle Clive. He was brought in as a guest character with the intention of expanding the Mitchell family roots.

Clive arrives in The Queen Victoria public house for great-nieces Louise Mitchell's (Rachel Cox) naming party. Clive is the uncle of Phil (Steve McFadden), Grant (Ross Kemp) and Sam (Kim Medcalf) and later revealed as the uncle of Ronnie (Samantha Janus) and Roxy (Rita Simons) after his brother Archie (Larry Lamb) is introduced in 2008. Clive only arrives for two episodes. Peggy asks Clive how his two sons Charlie and Harry are, and whether they are still worse than Phil and Grant. Clive has been mentioned a handful of times in the 1990s and a brief mention in 2003.

== Dave Roberts ==
Dave Roberts
- EastEnders character
- Portrayed by: David Kennedy
- First appearance: Episode 2400; 25 October 2002
- Last appearance: Episode 2407; 7 November 2002
In-universe information
- Occupation: Bar Manager

Dave Roberts, played by David Kennedy, is an applicant for the position of bar manager at Peggy Mitchell's (Barbara Windsor) pub, The Queen Victoria. He wins Peggy over by claiming to know her son, Grant (Ross Kemp), and starts the job on 28 October. However, he invites his dodgy friends to the pub, worrying Peggy about the type of customers he may attract.

He makes it up to her by offering to check the fire alarms in the pub, but annoys her further by going through a drawer full of her personal documents and asking her about her daughter Sam's (Kim Medcalf) love life. He goes on to question Sam about her relationships with Trevor Morgan (Alex Ferns) and Ricky Butcher (Sid Owen). He later berates Sam for cancelling the pub's bonfire party in the aftermath of the deaths of Tom Banks (Colm Ó Maonlaí) and Trevor Morgan, but praises Peggy for the cancellation. Sam becomes suspicious of Dave when he allows one of his friends to smoke cannabis in the pub.

After one of Dave's friends barges into Patrick Trueman (Rudolph Walker) in the pub, Peggy threatens to bar anyone who upsets her regular customers. Later that night, Sam catches Dave scheming with his friends to have a lock-in after hours. She threatens to call the police when they do not leave, but Dave grabs her and starts to pull her shirt off. Sam knees him in the groin and runs away. The next morning, the pub and the living quarters above are found to be trashed. Peggy is angry, but cannot get rid of Dave until his contract ends. Sam urges her to sack him sooner. Later in the bar, Dave starts getting close to Sam, at which point she tells Peggy what had happened the night before. Peggy tells her daughter that Dave will not get away with it.

After Dave's friends cause more havoc in the pub, this time upsetting Roy Evans (Tony Caunter), Dave claims that Walford is "soft" without Phil (Steve McFadden) and Grant around, which enrages Peggy further. Peggy confronts Dave and tells him that she is terminating his contract with immediate effect. When Dave refuses to leave, Peggy tries to round up some of Phil and Grant's associates, but to no avail. When Dave's friends trash the floral tributes to Tom, Roy steps in and tries to stop them, after Sharon (Letitia Dean) becomes distraught at the sight. The rest of Walford's male residents unite to drive the thugs out of town, and they are closely followed by Dave, who tries to steal some money from the pub's till, but is stopped by Sam wielding a baseball bat.

== Alfie Moon ==
Alfie Moon, played by Shane Richie, makes his first appearance on 21 November 2002, and leaves on 25 December 2005. He returns to EastEnders on 21 September 2010, following the return of on-screen wife Kat (Jessie Wallace) two episodes previously. Some of the character's most prominent storylines have included: his turbulent relationship with—and later marriage to—Kat Slater; the dementia and death of his grandmother, Nana Moon (Hilda Braid); believing that Kat's son Tommy had died of cot death, whereas in fact Ronnie Branning (Samantha Womack) had switched him with her own deceased child; and his wife's affair with Derek Branning (Jamie Foreman) (see Who's Been Sleeping with Kat?).

== Doris Moisey ==
Doris Moisey
- EastEnders character
- Portrayed by: Marcia Ashton
- Duration: 2002–2003
- First appearance: Episode 2419; 28 November 2002
- Last appearance: Episode 2474; 28 February 2003
In-universe information
- Occupation: Retired

Doris Moisey, played by Marcia Ashton, is a pensioner spinster who meets Jim Branning (John Bardon) at the gym in Walford and sets her sights on him. Doris pesters Jim and even starts going to his house to see him while his wife Dot (June Brown) is away. She sends Jim a Valentine's Day card, and intercepts Dot's card in the post, making Jim think that Dot has forgotten their anniversary.

When Jim hurts his back, Doris gives him a massage on his bed, only to be interrupted by Dot returning home. After Dot refuses to sleep in the same room as Jim, he goes for a drink with Doris and is torn between the two women. Patrick Trueman (Rudolph Walker) persuades Jim to make a list of pros and cons about both women. Dot finds the list and leaves Jim, leaving Doris to think she has won. Dot later moves back in with Jim and Doris leaves Albert Square. She has not been seen since.

== Spencer Moon ==
Spencer Moon, played by Christopher Parker, is the brother of Alfie Moon (Shane Richie). He falls for Kelly Taylor (Brooke Kinsella), but she initially refuses his advances. He then has a one-night stand with Vicki Fowler (Scarlett Alice Johnson) which leaves her pregnant. However, Vicki has an abortion. Spencer and Kelly then begin a relationship, but he is heartbroken when she does not return from working in Spain, as she has met someone else.

== Nana Moon ==
Victoria Alice "Nana" Moon, played by Hilda Braid, is the grandmother of Alfie (Shane Richie) and Spencer Moon (Christopher Parker). Her storylines include meeting Wilfred Atkins (Dudley Sutton), a fraudster who wants to con her out of her possessions. In 2005 Nana's health began to fail and she develops dementia, much to the worry of Alfie. Tragedy strikes when Alfie takes Nana to visit Normandy in France to see her late husband's grave.

== Kate Mitchell ==
Kate Mitchell, played by Jill Halfpenny, is an undercover policewoman who grows close to Phil Mitchell (Steve McFadden) to extract a confession of murder from him. However, Phil is innocent, and once the truth is revealed the couple begin a relationship and soon marry. However, the marriage ends, and Kate then has an affair with Den Watts (Leslie Grantham), Phil's arch-rival and the husband of her business partner, Chrissie (Tracy-Ann Oberman).

== Dougie Slade ==
Dougie Slade
- EastEnders character
- Portrayed by: John Bowler
- Duration: 2002–2003
- First appearance: Episode 2440; 31 December 2002
- Last appearance: Episode 2454; 24 January 2003
In-universe information
- Occupation: Retired Detective Sergeant

Detective Sergeant Dougie Slade, played by John Bowler, is a corrupt ex-police officer who was involved in the case which led to Alfie Moon (Shane Richie) being imprisoned for credit card fraud.

When The Queen Victoria pub wins the "East End Pub of the Year Award", Alfie is photographed and appears in the paper. Alfie is still using the false identity of Chris Wright, which he had used to get his job there. When Dougie sees the picture in the paper, he visits Alfie and threatens to expose his true identity unless he steals £4,000 from the cash till at the pub.

Dougie's plan is eventually scuppered when Alfie runs away and Peggy Mitchell (Barbara Windsor), the owner of the pub, catches Dougie helping himself to money from the till. Alfie is exposed afterwards, but still keeps his job at the pub, due to his charm and charisma.

== Others ==
Character	Date(s)	Actor	Circumstances
Anish Mistry	25 January 2002 – 28 February 2003	Ali Zahoor	The son of Nita Mistry (Bindya Solanki). Anish is about eight years old when he is first seen, and likes playing football. He leaves Walford in 2003 to live in India with Nita and her boyfriend Robbie Jackson (Dean Gaffney).
Krystal Cummings	28 January–1 February	Rula Lenska	The girlfriend of Frank Butcher (Mike Reid). She helps Frank fake his death in order to con expatriates in a property scam. She and Frank try to flee from criminals Neil and Clive, whom Krystal has stolen money from. They find them and demand their money back by holding Frank's ex-wife Peggy Mitchell (Barbara Windsor) hostage. Frank manages to raise the money, but Krystal switches the bags and runs off. Frank chases after Krystal and takes half of the money, which Neil and Clive find and take back.
Jason	28 January–1 February	James Taylor	He is the son of Krystal Cummings (Rula Lenska). He falls for Sam Mitchell (Kim Medcalf) but she turns him down.
Alistair	28 January–1 February	Michael Jayston	A friend of Frank Butcher (Mike Reid) who Peggy Mitchell (Barbara Windsor) meets and bonds with in Spain.
Neil	28 January–1 February	Martin Marquez	A pair of brothers who Krystal Cummings (Rula Lenska) has stolen money from. She tries to flee with her boyfriend Frank Butcher (Mike Reid) but they find them and demand their money back. They kidnap Frank's ex-wife Peggy (Barbara Windsor) and refuse to release her unless Krystal returns their money. Frank brings the money, but Krystal tricks him by switching the bags and runs off. They follow Frank who finds Krystal and they retrieve their money.
Clive	28 January–1 February	John Marquez	A pair of brothers who Krystal Cummings (Rula Lenska) has stolen money from. She tries to flee with her boyfriend Frank Butcher (Mike Reid) but they find them and demand their money back. They kidnap Frank's ex-wife Peggy (Barbara Windsor) and refuse to release her unless Krystal returns their money. Frank brings the money, but Krystal tricks him by switching the bags and runs off. They follow Frank who finds Krystal and they retrieve their money.
Alex	29 January–1 February	Franco Rey	A nightclub owner who Sam Mitchell (Kim Medcalf) works for as a lap dancer. He fires Sam during an argument with her mother Peggy (Barbara Windsor), and later evicts her from her home.
Cherry	1 February	Rosabud Melarkey	Girls who Sam Mitchell (Kim Medcalf) brings to lodge with Jason (James Taylor).
Laurel	1 February	Uncredited	Girls who Sam Mitchell (Kim Medcalf) brings to lodge with Jason (James Taylor).
Leah	1 February	Uncredited	Girls who Sam Mitchell (Kim Medcalf) brings to lodge with Jason (James Taylor).
Samir Mistry	20 June	Andrew Rajan	Nita Mistry's cousin. When Robbie Jackson (Dean Gaffney) sees Nita and Samir together, He assumes Nita is cheating on him. Nita then explains that Samir is her cousin.
Estella Hulton	21 June	Ellen Thomas	The mother of Precious Hudson (Judith Shekoni) who tries to help her escape from her husband Angel Hudson (Goldie).
Jason James	28 June–23 July (6 episodes)	Joseph Millson	Lynne Hobbs' (Elaine Lordan) ex-fiancé, who jilted her on their wedding day and fled to Dubai. After a chance meeting, the two rekindle their relationship, as Jason wants to reconcile, and almost persuades her to leave her husband Garry Hobbs (Ricky Groves) and move away with him. Garry finds out and he and Jason fight. After punching Garry, Jason smugly informs him about Lynne's intentions to run away with him. However, Lynne decides to stay, and Jason leaves.
Mikey Smith	30 July	Leo Gregory	Gus (Mohammed George) and Juley Smith's (Joseph Kpobie) stepbrother who helps them redecorate Number 25 while Jim (John Bardon) and Dot Branning (June Brown) are visiting Carol Jackson (Lindsey Coulson).
Sadie Banks	5 August–12 September	Isobel Middleton	Sadie is the estranged wife of Tom Banks (Colm Ó Maonlaí). She is unhappy that Tom has moved on with Sharon Watts (Letitia Dean) and schemes to split them up by using her daughter Charlotte as an excuse to be a part of Tom's life and lies that Tom is cheating on Sharon with her. She and Charlotte then rent a room at the B&B from Paul Trueman (Gary Beadle). Sadie's games manage to alienate Tom and Sharon from the rest of the square, but they put up a united front against them and Sadie. Sadie, in desperation, menaces Sharon and holds her host in her flat threatening to hurt her unless Tom gets back together with her. Tom and Ian Beale (Adam Woodyatt) arrive and Sadie looks herself in the bathroom. Tom tries to get her to open the door but she threatens to jump from the window. Tom is able to coax her down by telling to think of Charlotte. Sadie then agrees to get psychiatric help.
Rebecca Hibbert	12–13 August	Paulette Williams	The daughter of Milton Hibbert (Jeffrey Kissoon). She and Paul Trueman (Gary Beadle) begin to hit it off, much to the worry of Paul's brother Anthony (Nicholas Bailey), who has discovered that Milton is in fact, Paul's father and reveals this to Paul before he can have sex with Rebecca. Rebecca and Milton quickly leave Walford and have not been seen or heard from since.
Madge Mitchell	3–4 October	Uncredited	The great-aunt of Phil Mitchell (Steve McFadden). She arrives for Louise Mitchell's (Rachel Cox) naming party. Madge tells stories of the war to people around her and bores Jamie Mitchell (Jack Ryder). Peggy Mitchell (Barbara Windsor) later reveals to her sister Sal (Anna Karen) that Madge is 100 years old.
Bridget Banks	8 November	Mary Larkin	The mother of Tom Banks, who arrives in Walford for his funeral. Following the service, she invites Tom's fiancé Sharon Watts (Letitia Dean) to come back to Ireland with her. Sharon declines at first, but decides to join Bridget when she leaves.
Chris Wright	21 November-13 December	Tom Roberts	The original applicant for the job of bar manager of The Queen Victoria public house who is usurped by Alfie Moon (Shane Richie), who uses his name and identity. Chris, running late due to his car breaking down, phones landlady Peggy Mitchell (Barbara Windsor) only to be told by Alfie that the position has been filled. Three weeks later, Chris arrives in Walford to talk to Peggy. Alfie, fearing his facade will be unravelled, thinks of a scheme to get rid of Chris and tells them his grandmother, Nana Moon (Hilda Braid) is Peggy. When Chris confronts Nana about Alfie having his job and insults Alfie, she tells him to leave and threatens to set the dog on him.
Ted Mitchell	25 December	John Boswell	The uncle of Billy Mitchell (Perry Fenwick) and his wife who attend his wedding to Little Mo Morgan (Kacey Ainsworth) on Christmas day.
Vie Mitchell	25 December	Joan Linder	The uncle of Billy Mitchell (Perry Fenwick) and his wife who attend his wedding to Little Mo Morgan (Kacey Ainsworth) on Christmas day.
