= Jamie Mitchell =

Fictional character from EastEnders

- EastEnders character
- Portrayed by: Jack Ryder
- Duration: 1998–2002
- First appearance: Episode 1692; 9 November 1998
- Last appearance: Episode 2436; 25 December 2002
- Introduced by: Matthew Robinson
In-universe information
- Occupation: Mechanic
- Family: Mitchell
- Father: Charlie Mitchell
- Mother: Lynne Mitchell
- Grandfathers: Stevie Mitchell
- Uncles: Billy Mitchell; Teddy Mitchell
- First cousins: Janet Mitchell; Will Mitchell; Harry Mitchell
- Other relatives: Phil Mitchell; Grant Mitchell; Sam Mitchell

Jamie Mitchell is a fictional character from the BBC soap opera EastEnders, played by Jack Ryder. The character debuted on 9 November 1998 and became one of the show's central protagonists, until he was killed off on 25 December 2002.

During his time on the programme, Jamie's story arc mostly revolved on his close relationships with his godfather Phil Mitchell (Steve McFadden) and on-off former girlfriend Sonia Jackson (Natalie Cassidy). The character was originally Phil's second cousin once removed, but later became his surrogate son, after it transpired that Jamie had been regularly abused by uncle and guardian Billy (Perry Fenwick), who himself debuted on the show a week before Jamie's first appearance. Elsewhere, Jamie's romance with Sonia faced many complications, ever since she gave birth to Chloe (Jade Sharif) at the age of 15; Jamie always knew he was never the father of Sonia's child, and did not know who the father was, until it was revealed that his friend, Martin Fowler (James Alexandrou), was actually Chloe's father; this was a result of Martin and Sonia's one night stand, prior to her dating Jamie.

As such, Jamie was involved in some high-profile storylines that his family were often involved in. This included Jamie getting protection from Phil and his brother Grant Mitchell (Ross Kemp) when Billy ends up moving into the square; nursing Phil back to health after his criminal job with Grant ended with the Mitchell Brothers plunging their getaway car in the River Thames; losing his virginity to Phil's troublesome stepsister Janine (Charlie Brooks) before his romance with Sonia emerged; sparking friendships with both Sonia's brother Robbie (Dean Gaffney) and Phil's employee Garry Hobbs (Ricky Groves); temporarily dating Sonia's neighbour Zoe Slater (Michelle Ryan) after their relationship nearly collapses; getting embroiled in feuds with Phil's two archenemies, Steve Owen (Martin Kemp) and Dan Sullivan (Craig Fairbrass), that escalated in the Who Shot Phil? scenario; clashing with both Steve's widow Mel Healy (Tamzin Outhwaite) and Martin's older brother Mark (Todd Carty) over the circumstances behind Phil's shooting; comforting Phil and Grant's sister Sam (Kim Medcalf) over her failed relationship with Billy's sworn nemesis Trevor Morgan (Alex Ferns); and helping reclaim the stolen purse that belonged to Phil's mother Peggy (Barbara Windsor).

In the follow-up to "Who Shot Phil?" and its aftermath, Jamie's conflict with Billy improves after the source behind their hostility was disclosed due to Billy having been previously abused in orphanage. At the same time, however, Jamie's relationship with Phil deteriorates after he helps his former girlfriend Lisa Shaw (Lucy Benjamin) escape to Portugal with their daughter Louise. This resulted in Phil beating Jamie up in October 2002, a moment that issued thirty-one complaints to the Broadcasting Standards Commission. Two months later, the character's exit was presented when Jamie – after getting engaged to Sonia – is hospitalised after Martin runs him over in his car; Jamie consequently spends his last days in hospital until he eventually dies of spleen damage on Christmas Day.

When Ryder decided to quit his role, executive producer John Yorke said that the 'door would be left open' for Jamie to return. This was later overturned when Yorke was succeeded by Louise Berridge, who made the choice to kill Jamie off. The decision was highly criticised, and Ryder said it was a shock for him – though he stated that if he had not been killed off, he would not have returned anyway. In 1999, Ryder was nominated three times for Best Newcomer and for his exit storyline was nominated for Best Exit in 2003 at The British Soap Awards.

== Development ==
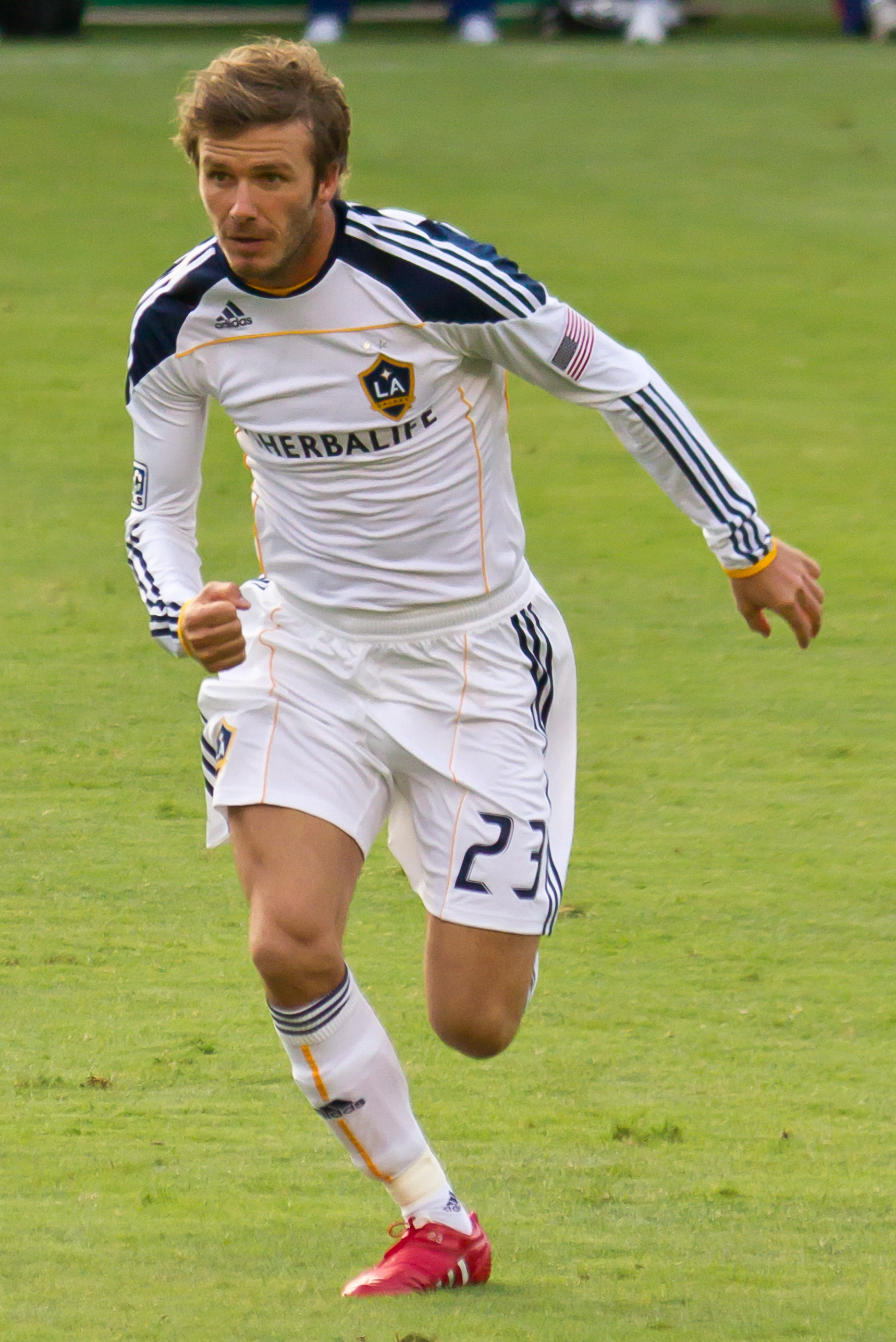
Jamie was described as a "mini David Beckham".

The EastEnders website describes Jamie as vulnerable, gorgeous, beautiful, a stud, and "the Square's ultimate bit of cockney totty in the late nineties", with "floppy, David Beckham styled locks". Perry Fenwick, who plays Billy, said that they used to call Ryder a "mini David Beckham". In 2003, after Jamie's death, it was reported that a whodunit-style storyline would take place, involving a female character getting pregnant. The possibilities were Sonia carrying Jamie's baby, Kat Slater (Jessie Wallace) being pregnant by Anthony Trueman (Nicholas Bailey) or Sam Mitchell (Kim Medcalf), having Trevor Morgan's (Alex Ferns) child. It was later revealed that Kat was pregnant.

=== Departure and death ===
Ryder's decision to quit was announced in March 2002, on which he stated, "I have decided to leave EastEnders after four fantastic years to pursue other projects. It has not been an easy decision but I felt it was time for me to build on the experience the show has given me and play other parts. EastEnders gave me the best opportunity a young actor could have dreamed of and I will always be grateful to them for that." EastEnders's executive producer John Yorke commented, "Jack has made a big contribution to EastEnders playing the much loved Jamie Mitchell. "We will be very sad to see him go but we wish him all the best for his future." It was said that Ryder would leave in November 2002 at the end of his contract, and Yorke said he would appear in episodes until February 2003. The News of the World then reported that Jamie would be killed off in a car accident at Christmas. Yorke wanted Ryder to be able to return, but when he was succeeded by Louise Berridge, the decision was made to kill Jamie off and that a Christmas death would be "gripping". An EastEnders crew member told the newspaper that other members of the cast were shocked that Jamie would be killed as Ryder was popular. They went on to say that "[Ryder] thought it was all amicable but he's bewildered by the whole affair. It's complete madness because he's the one all the girls love and attracts a huge young following. Who's left who's sexy?" Speaking of his departure he told the Daily Mirror, "I was a bit shocked by their decision. When I said he was going to leave, they said they would keep the door open. Then Louise took over as producer and they said they wanted a good exit. It didn't really matter either way to me. I wasn't planning on coming back. At the end of the day, it's their choice. They hired me. Jamie was always having an affair or another fight with Phil and I didn't want to be in a soap for the rest of my life."

== Storylines ==
Jamie is first seen just weeks after the death of his father, Charlie Mitchell (Charlie Heptinstall), in November 1998. He first receives a visit from Phil Mitchell (Steve McFadden), his second cousin once removed, who is also Jamie's godfather. They steadily bond when Phil comforts Jamie over his father's death and it quickly transpires that Jamie has been regularly abused by his uncle Billy (Perry Fenwick), ever since he became his guardian, following Charlie's passing. Phil learns about this when he witnesses Billy attacking Jamie on his 16th birthday, which prompts Phil to threaten Billy with violence until Jamie stops him. Phil later apologizes and Jamie decides to live with him in Albert Square, the market square in Walford, so he could escape Billy's abuse. Thereupon, Jamie quickly becomes Phil's surrogate son, replacing Phil's son Ben (Morgan Whittle) after the latter had left the square with his mother and Phil's estranged wife Kathy Beale (Gillian Taylforth).

After moving into the square, Jamie gradually builds his potential among the Mitchell family when Phil takes him under his wing at The Arches car lot. Jamie also tries bond with Phil's brother Grant (Ross Kemp) after learning of their notorious hardman status as "The Mitchell Brothers", up to the point where Jamie ends up getting put in a situation when Grant is alleged to have hospitalized his long-suffering wife Tiffany Raymond (Martine McCutcheon) after she falls down the stairs in the midst of their argument over Grant's domestic mistreatment towards her. Grant later asks Jamie to babysit his and Tiffany's daughter, Courtney, when he finds himself having to square off with his love rival Beppe di Marco (Michael Greco) over the situation with Tiffany. Later on, Jamie comforts Grant after Tiffany dies on New Year's Eve 1998 after she gets accidentally run over just outside The Queen Victoria public house – where the Mitchell Brothers reside with their mother Peggy (Barbara Windsor) and her fiancé Frank Butcher (Mike Reid), the driver who accidentally killed Tiffany.

In August 1999, Billy comes to the square and begins hassling Jamie over money he needs to pay back to loan sharks. Jamie soon alerts Phil and Grant about this, which prompts them to threaten Billy unless he leaves Jamie alone and departs the square forever. However, Grant soon requests for Billy's assistance and arranges to borrow some money through his contacts known as Milligan & Frater, subsequently they commit arson at The Arches when their renewed terms of the loan are not met and Jamie is presumed dead when the explosion takes place until Beppe tells Phil and Grant that he saw him safe in the cafe moments ago. This leads to Phil and Grant doing a large scale criminal job that ends with the brothers plunging a getaway car into the River Thames, where Phil is rescued while Grant was yet to be found. Jamie and Billy rush to Phil's hospital bedside, where the trio ponder on whether Grant survived and the loan sharks will continue to hunt them down. Working together, they are able to clear their debt with Milligan & Frater and also learn that Grant has survived the incident; Grant later departs the country with Courtney to start anew in Rio de Janeiro, Brazil. However, Billy continues to bully Jamie in light of the incident's aftermath. Jamie eventually stands up to Billy and beats him up at his workplace in the E20.

After standing up to Billy and coping with Grant leaving the square, Jamie progressively bonds with Phil more than ever. He soon begins a romantic friendship with local teenager Sonia Jackson (Natalie Cassidy), who had initially rejected his efforts after Jamie ends up losing his virginity to Frank's spoiled daughter Janine (Charlie Brooks); she later changed her mind after Janine humiliates Jamie by spreading rumours about his inadequate prowess in bed. In response to this, Jamie dumps Janine while she is working for Kathy's son Ian (Adam Woodyatt) at the local cafe; Jamie begins to clash with Ian over the latter's ongoing rivalry with Phil despite being his stepson as well. By then, Jamie has befriended Sonia's brother Robbie (Dean Gaffney) and their friend Martin Fowler (James Alexandrou) – the latter of whom becomes Jamie's best-friend after he defends Martin from an altercation with Beppe's brother Gianni (Marc Bannerman).

They later get into trouble after causing a mess in The Queen Victoria and being forced to clean up. Jamie gets on well with Sonia's grandfather Jim Branning (John Bardon) and his future wife Dot Cotton (June Brown) as their relationship continues, but this changes when 15 year old Sonia gives birth to a daughter. Jamie assumes he is the father until he finds out that Martin is the father, upon sleeping with Sonia before their relationship and she didn't tell him about it. This leads to Jamie confronting Martin at his house on Christmas Day, after which Jamie is ordered to leave by Martin's mother Pauline (Wendy Richard), with the help from Dot's infamous son Nick (John Altman) and his wayward offspring, Ashley (Frankie Fitzgerald). Afterwards, Jamie helps Sonia raise her daughter Chloe after Martin refuses to be part of her life at first. But, this changes again when Chloe is put up for adoption and Sonia resorts to kidnapping her child, whom she later renames Rebecca. In the end, Sonia keeps the child and attempts to rebuild her romance with Jamie. This appears to not be the case when Jamie begins dating her neighbour Zoe Slater (Michelle Ryan) in light of the situation, which later prompts Sonia to become close with Martin's colleague Gus Smith (Mohammed George). However, it becomes clear to Jamie and Sonia that their love for each other is perfect beyond otherwise and they get back together – even though Jamie ends up being confronted by Zoe's older sister Kat (Jessie Wallace) for leaving her heartbroken.

In March 2001, Phil gets shot by an unseen assailant and Jamie resolves to take care of his business empire until he recovers. Jamie later suspects that one of Phil's two archenemies, Steve Owen (Martin Kemp) and Dan Sullivan (Craig Fairbrass), is the culprit when he becomes involved in their dangerous feud – up to the point where Dan begins to extort money from Jamie in his revenge against Phil, while Steve begins clashing with Jamie over the escalating situation. Billy, who is working for Steve as his errand boy, learns about Jamie's struggle and taunts him about it until Jamie overpowers Billy in the snooker club and forces him to submit. Moreover, Jamie ends up sharing his theory with Steve's wife and Dan's former girlfriend Mel Healy (Tamzin Outhwaite). By the time Phil has recovered, it is revealed that the shooter was in fact his ex-girlfriend and Mel's best-friend Lisa Shaw (Lucy Benjamin). He doesn't tell Jamie about this, however, and the two resolve to implicate Dan and Steve behind the shooting in order to rid them out of the square for good. Phil sets his plan to frame Dan as the shooter and Steve as an accessory in motion when he contacts Dan's former crime boss, Ritchie Stringer (Gareth Hunt), and lends him Steve's handgun that Lisa used to shoot him; Ritchie later gives Dan the gun under the pretense of being permitted to further extort Phil. Later on that night, Dan threatens Phil at gunpoint and Jamie intervenes when he suspects that something has gone wrong. Dan nearly shoots them until the police arrive and arrest him for shooting Phil. Afterwards, Phil summons his lawyer Marcus Christie (Stephen Churchett) and the two advice Jamie to testify against Dan to ensure he gets sent down. Jamie complies and Phil later entraps Steve into conspiring with him against Dan to rid themselves of their common enemy. However, their plan fails when Dan is found not guilty and he gets revenge on Phil by kidnapping Mel for a £200,000 ransom – with Dan also getting revenge on Steve for conspiring with Phil against him and using Mel as leverage to exact his vengeance.

Following the events of Phil's shooting and Dan's escape from the square, Jamie learns that Lisa is pregnant with Phil's baby Louise and reluctantly agrees to keep this secret after seeing how Phil has been mistreating Lisa in the past – with Jamie himself starting to grow as uncomfortable with Phil's continual behaviour as many people around him have already been feeling. Their relationship eventually strains on New Year's Day 2002, when Phil discovers the truth about his parentage, despite Lisa telling him that her new boyfriend and Martin's older brother Mark (Todd Carty) is the father, and that Jamie knew about it all along due to Lisa telling him. Feeling betrayed, Phil confronts Jamie outside Sonia's house and disowns him, without giving his godson a chance to explain himself. Phil soon takes Jamie's supposed betrayal just as seriously when he leaves his godson homeless, sacking him from The Arches instead of his employee Garry Hobbs (Ricky Groves), and arranges for Jamie to be blacklisted from working at any other mechanic after Phil blames Jamie for causing the whole situation in the first place – even though Jamie had learned about the situation firsthand from Phil and Grant's ex-lover, Sharon Watts (Letitia Dean). This quickly catches the attention of Steve, who he attempts to groom Jamie into working for him against Phil and pays him to smash the Queen Vic's windows as an example of this. Jamie complies and Steve pays him with the additional offer of replacing Billy as his errand boy. Phil later discovers that Jamie smashed the windows and brutally chucks him out of the pub. Jamie later contemplates on Steve's offer, but he changes his mind and manages to get back in Phil's good books when Steve is later killed in a vehicle explosion at the climax of his feud with Phil – the case of which results in Mel leaving the square as well.

It is at this point where Jamie starts to properly bond with Billy after learning that he was previously victimized in an abusive care home by Dot and Jim's old acquaintance Ernie Johnson (John Junkin), who briefly appears on the square until Billy confronts him and Ernie moves out of Walford. Furthermore, Jamie supports Billy in his romantic bonding with Kat's sister Little Mo (Kacey Ainsworth) and helps defend them from her abusive husband Trevor Morgan (Alex Ferns) – whom Billy has begun a feud with ever since he found out that Trevor has been domestically abusing Little Mo during their prolonged marriage. This impact extends to the point where Trevor enrages Little Mo's family, including her father Charlie (Derek Martin) and grandmother Mo Harris (Laila Morse), by exposing a shocking revelation in public; Kat is not Zoe's older sister as it originally appeared to be, but in fact her mother, who got raped at the age of 13 by her perverted uncle Harry (Michael Elphick) – who also turns out to be Zoe's father and not Charlie himself. Towards the first anniversary of when Garry married Charlie's other daughter Lynne (Elaine Lordan) a year ago, Jamie celebrates Billy's engagement to Little Mo after Trevor gets killed in a house explosion alongside Sharon's fiancé Tom Banks (Colm Ó Maonlaí) when he tried rescuing him just as he earlier did for Trevor's son Sean Andrews and Little Mo herself – both of whom Trevor tried to kill that night.

With his interaction with Billy improving better than it was, Jamie appears to have sorted out his troubles and plans to get engaged to Sonia. However, he gets into trouble with Phil once again, when Lisa decides to leave the country with Louise and Jamie unwittingly helps them. Phil learns about this and confronts Sonia in front of Jamie, believing that she was the one colluding with Lisa against him. Phil prepares to attack Sonia when Jamie comes to her defense, and admits that he was the one who helped Lisa. In response, Phil brutally attacks Jamie and beats him up until Sonia is forced to tell him that Lisa has taken Louise to Portugal. Phil quickly leaves to try and get Louise back. Meanwhile, Sonia nurses Jamie back to health, and they passionately kiss. Later, Jamie proposes and Sonia accepts. However, Jamie sells the ring in order to get a business but later wants it back. When Phil returns, his relationship with Jamie has deteriorated and a conflict ensues between them when him and Sonia suspect Phil of murdering Lisa. The would-be couple soon get in touch with DCI Jill Marsden (Sophie Stanton), the police detective who investigated Phil's shooting a year ago, with this theory and Phil ends up getting arrested; he is later released without charged due to lack of evidence. Sonia is left angry by recent events but Jamie convinces her that he still supports her and wants her to get on with her life.

As Christmas 2002 draws closer, Jamie witnesses Peggy being mugged during the episode aired on 17 December and rushes to her aid. He takes her back home, where Phil promptly kicks Jamie out again after misinterpreting the situation. In the following episode, Jamie later spots Peggy's mugger and manages to retrieve Peggy's stolen purse, much to her gratitude. That night, Jamie plans to surprise Sonia with flowers and has now got Ethel's ring back before he meets her, however, before he has a chance to find her, Jamie ends up coming across Martin Fowler, who is driving his car whilst disqualified and on his phone. Martin accidentally runs over Jamie outside Walford East tube station and he is left in critical condition and gets hospitalised. Phil and Sonia are alerted about Jamie's accident, Sonia takes everything out on Phil and even accuses him of hurting Jamie once she sees his body. They later visit Jamie in hospital. They soon learn that Jamie will inevitably die of liver damage, leaving Sonia distraught and Phil feeling increasingly regretful for the way he treated Jamie over the situation with Louise. The rest of the Mitchells, including Phil's sister Sam (Kim Medcalf), are soon told about this and each visit him on Christmas Day before his death, with both Phil and Billy being able to make peace with Jamie after they apologize for the abuse they separately inflicted onto him. Afterwards, Billy proceeds to marry Little Mo while Phil stays behind to watch Jamie's last moments with Sonia. After they express their love for each other and kiss, Jamie dies in Sonia's arms and Phil tearfully watching outside his bedside. Sonia is absolutely devastated but tries to forget about it to the point of her refusing to go to the funeral. She is later seen talking to a shrine of Jamie. At Jamie's funeral, Phil and Sonia make amends for Jamie's sake, and they each deliver a eulogy for his memory. Phil also blames Martin for Jamie's death and plans to get revenge, but is convinced by Frank's spouse and Peggy's best friend Pat Butcher (Pam St Clement) and Sonia that Martin never intended for it to happen.

Jamie is subsequently referenced by Phil and Billy on many occasions. First when Phil is requested by Kat's future husband, Alfie Moon (Shane Richie), to prevent his little brother Spencer (Christopher Parker) from getting in trouble with the square's gangland boss Jack Dalton (Hywel Bennett) over forged currency, with Phil initially refusing, until seeing a photo of Jamie makes him think otherwise; this impact leads to Phil saving Kate Morton (Jill Halfpenny) from being killed by Dalton's hitman George Peters (Andy Beckwith), before later conspiring with Sharon's half-brother Dennis Rickman (Nigel Harman) to kill Dalton himself.

On the first anniversary of Jamie's death, Phil is forced to leave the square until 2005 after he is set up for armed robbery by Sharon and Dennis' illegitimate father Den (Leslie Grantham). In 2008, Billy mentions Jamie after he nearly lashes out at his adopted son Jay Brown (Jamie Borthwick), whom he took under his wing ever since he witnessed Jay's father Jase Dyer (Stephen Lord) getting murdered by his gang boss Terry Bates (Nicholas Ball). After the incident occurs, while the pair are having dinner with Phil's uncle Archie (Larry Lamb) and his girlfriend Suzy Branning (Maggie O'Neill) in the pub, Phil comforts Billy over Jay and assures him that their relationship would improve, just like they each improved their own relationships with Jamie.

Nine years later, in 2017, Jamie's death is mentioned again by Martin (now played by James Bye) during his conversation with his and Sonia's daughter Rebecca (Jasmine Armfield), now called Bex. In their conversation, Martin tells Bex that killing Jamie was the biggest mistake of his life because of all of the negative gossip he endured during his adolescence. Martin empathises with Bex when she is bullied at school, saying that she should not let others talk negatively about her, and that life moves on eventually.

In 2019, Ben mentioned Jamie's death, when he explains to Kathy that part of his reason for getting Martin to work for him is penance for killing Jamie. Billy visits Jamie's grave in June 2023, shortly before the funeral of his granddaughter Lola Pearce (Danielle Harold). Following Lola's death from a brain tumour, Billy explains to Phil and Jay how everybody he loves either leaves him or dies and that he wishes he could take their pain away from them. Phil tells Billy that the deaths of Jamie and Lola were not his fault, and successfully encourages Billy to attend Lola's funeral.

In April 2024, Jamie is mentioned when Stevie Mitchell (Alan Ford) arrived in Walford for the first time in 25 years. While talking to his son, Billy, he asks about Jamie, only for Billy to tell him about Jamie's death before angrily telling him to leave.

== Reception ==
The October 2002 episode that showed Jamie badly beaten by Phil prompted thirty-one complaints to the Broadcasting Standards Commission, who felt that although the scene was short, it was too violent for the time of broadcast. The episode that saw Jamie get run over was watched by 12 million people, while the hour-long episode in which he dies attracted 16 million viewers and was named by the Metro as one of the top five EastEnders exits in June 2010.

In July 2011, BBC aired an EastEnders special called EastEnders Greatest Exits. It showed the best departures in the show's history, with Jamie's death being one of them. Jamie's death was called "tragic", and McFadden said, "to see a young man losing his life was one of those tragic moments that this show pulls off really well." Charlie Brooks said, "it was heartbreaking for the nation" and Fenwick described Jamie's last episode as "very sad". Finally, Joe Swash said, "EastEnders is really good at bringing you back down to earth with a bump. You celebrate one thing and mourn poor old Jamie's death. Not only that but there was probably about 25 million girls out there, breaking their hearts because they all loved Jack Ryder".

In 2020, Sara Wallis and Ian Hyland from The Daily Mirror placed Jamie 68th on their ranked list of the best EastEnders characters of all time, writing that when he arrived in 1998 he was "full of boyband good looks and youthful energy".

=== Accolades ===
In 1999 at The British Soap Awards Ryder was nominated for 'Best Newcomer' though lost out to fellow EastEnders star Tamzin Outhwaite (Melanie Healy) The same year he was nominated for Most Popular Newcomer at the National Television Awards, but again did not win, as well as 'Best Newcomer' again at the TVChoice Awards, awarded by TV Choice magazine, this time winning. In 2003, he was nominated for 'Best Exit' at The British Soap Awards, but did not win.
