= Paul Trueman =

Fictional character from EastEnders

- EastEnders character
- Portrayed by: Gary Beadle
- Duration: 2001–2004
- First appearance: Episode 2099; 23 April 2001
- Last appearance: Episode 2856; 23 December 2004
- Introduced by: John Yorke
In-universe information
- Father: Milton Hibbert
- Mother: Audrey Trueman
- Stepfather: Patrick Trueman
- Half-brothers: Anthony Trueman
- Half-sisters: Rebecca Hibbert
- Daughters: Eleanor Trueman
- Nephews: Josh Goodwin; Euan Trueman
- Nieces: Jasmine Fisher

Paul Trueman is a fictional character from the BBC soap opera EastEnders, played by Gary Beadle. The character, who first arrived onto Albert Square on 23 April 2001 and later departed the programme on 23 December 2004, was portrayed as a bad boy who was a member of the already-established Trueman family. In his exit storyline, Paul became a drug dealer, which Beadle has been critical towards, as he suggested it played into black racial stereotyping. It was implied that Paul was killed upon his exit, though his death was not screened.

During his time on the show, Paul instigates a feud with his brother Anthony (Nicholas Bailey); copes with the untimely death of their mother Audrey (Corinne Skinner-Carter); develops a close interaction with Audrey's ex-husband Patrick (Rudolph Walker), who soon turns out to be Paul's adoptive father; sparks friendships with the square's local hardman Phil Mitchell (Steve McFadden) and his nemesis Steve Owen (Martin Kemp); gets blackmailed by old acquaintance Angel Hudson (Goldie) into repaying him the money he owes and later having a relationship with the latter's estranged lover Precious (Judi Shekoni); conspire with Phil's cousin Billy (Perry Fenwick) to force his enemy Trevor Morgan (Alex Ferns) into leaving Walford so his wife, Little Mo Mitchell (Kacey Ainsworth), would be prevented from further domestic abuse; temporarily romanced with Phil's sister Sam Mitchell (Kim Medcalf); dating Janine Butcher (Charlie Brooks) and plotting together to steal Barry Evans's (Shaun Williamson) money, culminating in Janine murdering Barry the day after they got married; supports Patrick on his wedding day to his fellow shopkeeper Yolande Duke (Angela Wynter); and end up working for Sam's gangland husband Andy Hunter (Michael Higgs), which ultimately contributes to Paul's departure from the show.

== Development ==
Beadle was critical of his exit storyline, accusing EastEnders of racial stereotyping for turning his character into a drug dealer. He commented to The Mirror: "I hate the storyline, I'm really not happy about it. It's so unimaginative, full of stereotypes - black people and drugs, blah, blah, blah. Any scenes involving drugs, you can rest assured I hated filming them. I just knew Paul wouldn't do that - it's not his style. Once they started hanging my character so dramatically, I knew I'd made the right decision to leave." Speaking to BBC Radio 1 in 2004, Beadle stated that the storyline had a negative effect on his private life, with public shouting at him in the street things such as 'Drug dealer' or 'Sell me some drugs'. Beadle suggested that the storyline was "about a very deep subject and if you are going to write about that subject then you need to explain it completely. I'm just talking about believability. You need to show the beginning, the middle and the end, otherwise it looks negative." Beadle also said that he was disappointed that Paul was not shown to die on-screen - his death was implied not screened.

== Storylines ==
Paul Trueman first appeared at Albert Square in Walford in April 2001, when he visits his brother Anthony (Nicholas Bailey) and their mother Audrey (Corinne Skinner-Carter) upon being estranged for them for some time. Audrey rejects him, but he decides to stay – going as far as to blackmail Anthony for money in exchange for keeping his drink-driving secret. Paul soon befriends Steve Owen (Martin Kemp), a local nightclub owner, when they begin to play poker with local hardman Phil Mitchell (Steve McFadden) and most of their neighbours. During one of Steve's poker events, however, Paul is shocked when his old acquaintance Angel Hudson (Goldie) joins the game. It quickly transpires that Paul owes Angel money, and Angel – after recognising Paul – threatens to harm him unless he pays up. Paul tries to get the money by stealing property from his mother, pawning the goods and gambling the money he receives. This fails and he ends up with less money than he began with. When Angel comes to collect his money, Paul fails to pay, so Angel gives him a severe beating and trashes Audrey's bed and breakfast. As Angel continues to threat him, Paul blackmails Anthony into giving him the money. Anthony has no choice but to oblige; he takes out a loan and Paul pays Angel.

Audrey is struck by falling debris while walking past some building works. Several days later, after an argument with Paul during which he revealed Anthony was the one who was driving at the time of the accident, Audrey collapses and dies, caused by a delayed reaction to the blow she received earlier. Just before she dies, Audrey tells Paul that she knew about Anthony being the driver and tells Paul to tell Anthony that she loves him. Paul replies "What about me?". Just as Audrey is about to say something to him, she dies. However, everything is left to Paul in Audrey's will. Paul's supposed father Patrick (Rudolph Walker) arrives in Walford for her funeral. Paul initially reacts to Patrick with apprehension but they eventually bond. Both are devastated when Anthony discovers via DNA tests that Patrick is not Paul's biological father. Paul later discovers he is the biological child of Milton Hibbert (Jeffery Kissoon), Patrick's friend with whom Audrey had been having an affair. Despite this, Patrick and Paul maintain a close relationship.

Angel returns with more orders for Paul. It turns out that Angel is being prepared to stand trial for murder and he is using his wife, Precious (Judi Shekoni), as a fake alibi. He tells Paul to guard her until she can testify. Paul obliges and Precious moves to the square. Paul initially does not know that Precious is Angel's wife and when she make advances towards him, he has no qualms about having sex with her. The two begin an affair, but both fear repercussions from Angel. Precious refuses to be Angel's alibi, hoping that he will be imprisoned, but he is found not guilty. Paul and Precious make plans to flee the country, but a brawl between the Truemans and the Slaters at the Queen Vic stalls their departure and Angel apprehends Precious, stating that she can have her divorce; however, if he ever discovers she and Paul have resumed their relationship, he will kill them both. Precious has no choice but to finish with Paul and leave Walford alone.

In 2002, Paul helps Phil's cousin Billy (Perry Fenwick) with helping the latter's love interest Little Mo Mitchell (Kacey Ainsworth) escape her domestic abuse ordeal for her tormenting estranged husband Trevor Morgan (Alex Ferns). They plan on forcing Trevor to sign divorce papers and getting him to leave Walford, but Trevor continues to hassle Little Mo until he is eventually killed in an explosion caused by himself on Halloween Night that year.

In 2003, Paul is shocked when an abandoned baby is left on his doorstep. The child is the result of a one-night stand between Paul and a woman called Amy, who dumped the child her on Paul's doorstep; soon, he struggles to cope as a single parent. Paul names the baby Eleanor (Charnae Leckie), after the mother of his step-father Patrick. As Paul starts to cope with looking after Eleanor, Amy decides she wants her back and Social Services collect her, leaving Paul heartbroken.

That same year, Paul begins a sexual relationship with Billy's ex-girlfriend Janine Butcher (Charlie Brooks); she concocts a plan to fleece her step-brother Barry Evans (Shaun Williamson) of all his money and invites Paul into her scheme, which he accepts. Janine professes to love Barry while all the time sleeping with Paul. However, on Janine's wedding day to Barry, Paul attempts to stop the plan by confessing that he loves her and they do not need Barry's money. However, Janine refuses and marries Barry anyway, as she has also been led to believe that he is terminally ill and could use the opportunity to inherit his wealth. However, when Janine learns from Barry that his illness is a false alarm, she becomes repulsed by him, and confesses that their marriage is a sham, also revealing her affair with Paul in the process. Barry attempts to get Janine to love him by forgiving her, but she ends up pushing him away, and Barry consequently falls down a ravine to his death.

In 2004, following Barry's death on New Year's Day and his wedding to Janine the day before, Paul suffers from immense guilt about his involvement; he makes a conscious effort to support Barry's grieving ex-wife Natalie (Lucy Speed). When Paul finds out that Janine killed Barry, he furiously breaks up with her upon seeing her lack of remorse. He then develops feelings for Natalie and they begin a relationship, but he has a hard time hiding his guilt from her. After Natalie grows suspicious of the nature of Paul's relationship with Janine, he finally reveals Janine's role in Barry's death and makes a statement to the police.

Janine is questioned, but released due to lack of evidence. She promptly tells Natalie that Paul had conspired with her to 'fleece' Barry from the start, and gloats about getting away with murder. Devastated, and unable to prove Janine's guilt to the police, Natalie leaves Paul and Albert Square. When Janine taunts Paul about it in The Queen Victoria public house, he becomes incensed and attempts to attack her before getting restrained. However, Janine eventually gets her comeuppance when she is wrongfully implicated for the death of her sworn enemy Laura Beale (Hannah Waterman). Janine had come to Paul for help, but he rejected her, and watched in delight with others as Janine was arrested for Laura's death.

Paul eventually decides to leave Walford and join Anthony travelling over Europe, but returns to the square to see Patrick marry his next wife, Yolande (Angela Wynter), and is thus persuaded to stay in Walford. Paul has a spell working with troubled youth, but begins to get involved in crime again when he starts drug-dealing for the square's crime boss Andy Hunter (Michael Higgs). Towards Christmas 2004, Paul ends up getting arrested by the police who are investigating Andy's criminal empire; Paul is eventually forced to inform the police about Andy's gangland activities in order to avoid facing a prison sentence. Soon enough, Paul is authorised to help the police entrap Andy in a drug trade. However, this fails when Andy becomes suspicious and escapes the sting operation. When they cross paths with each other later on, Andy realises that Paul has grassed him up to the police and arranges to have him killed in retribution. Paul considers escaping, but realises his family would be in danger if he does, so he says a tearful goodbye to Patrick and the family. A taxi then arrives for Paul, whose driver is actually a hitman sent by Andy to kill Paul for his betrayal. Paul tells Patrick he is leaving and will not be seen again, which leaves his father unaware that Paul is actually leaving to be killed. As he leaves the square, Paul asks the driver to 'make it quick' as his family and Andy separately watch him depart the square; Paul was killed off-screen.

A month later, in January 2005, Patrick begins to grow suspicious about Paul's fate, and questions Andy upon realising that he was the last person to have spoken to Paul before his 'departure'. Andy frequently denies knowing what has happened to Paul, and attempts to get Patrick to drop the subject, to no avail.

Patrick continues to pester Andy for information, and attempts to do so again when the latter is having a meet-up with fellow mob boss Johnny Allen (Billy Murray), who thereupon realises that Andy has had Paul killed. In order to build-up his plans to usurp Andy's status as the square's reigning gangland boss, Johnny arranges for Paul's body to be unearthed. When that happens, Patrick is visited by the police and he is devastated to learn that Paul has been killed.

After identifying Paul's corpse, Patrick realises that Andy had Paul killed and confronts him about it. Andy denies this, but Patrick swears revenge on Andy for having Paul killed by telling him "Paul's ghost is not going to rest, until I make you pay for it!". In February 2005, Paul's funeral takes place and a few weeks later Andy gets killed by Johnny, much to Patrick's delight, as Patrick feels that justice has been served for Paul's murder.

== Reception ==
In 2020, Sara Wallis and Ian Hyland from The Daily Mirror placed Paul 78th on their ranked list of the best EastEnders characters of all time, calling him "wayward" and noting his key role in Janine killing "poor Barry Evans". In 2021, Laura-Jayne Tyler from Inside Soap wrote that Paul was "one of the best Walford characters of his time – taken from us in such a way that we still cling to the hope that he's not really dead...C'mon EastEnders, we know you're reading this!"
