= Little Mo Mitchell =

Fictional character from EastEnders

- EastEnders character
- Kacey Ainsworth as Little Mo Mitchell (2004)
- Portrayed by: Kacey Ainsworth; Uncredited (2018 flashback); Layla Ingleby (2025 flashback)
- Duration: 2000–2006, 2018, 2025
- First appearance: Episode 2003; 18 September 2000
- Last appearance: Episode 7216; 30 October 2025
- Created by: Tony Jordan
- Introduced by: John Yorke (2001); Ben Wadey (2025)
- Spin-off appearances: Slaters in Detention (2003); Children in Need (2005)
In-universe information
- Other names: Maureen Slater; Little Mo Slater; Little Mo Morgan; Little Mo Mitchell
- Occupation: Barmaid
- Family: Slater/Mitchell
- Father: Charlie Slater
- Mother: Viv Slater
- Sisters: Lynne Hobbs; Kat Slater; Belinda Peacock
- Husband: Trevor Morgan (until 2002); Billy Mitchell (2002–2006)
- Sons: Freddie Slater
- Stepsons: Sean Andrews
- Grandmothers: Mo Harris
- Uncles: Harry Slater
- Aunts: Violet Slater
- Nephews: Dermott Dolan; Tommy Moon; Bert Moon; Ernie Moon
- Nieces: Zoe Slater; Vivienne Hobbs
- First cousins: Brian Slater
- Other relatives: Jasmine Fisher; Josh Goodwin; Stacey Slater; Sean Slater; Kyle Slater; Lily Slater; Arthur Fowler; Hope Fowler; Hayley Slater; Cherry Slater; Charli Slater

Little Mo Mitchell (also Slater and Morgan) is a fictional character from the BBC soap opera EastEnders, played by Kacey Ainsworth from 18 September 2000 to 26 May 2006. The character additionally appeared as a baby in a flashback set in 1978 on 25 December 2018. She also appeared as a child in video footage set in 1988 on 29 and 30 October 2025, played by Layla Ingleby.

Little Mo originally appears in a turbulent marriage with her abusive husband Trevor Morgan (Alex Ferns), but she fights back at Trevor, leading to her arrest in 2002; she is later released and Trevor's campaign against her ends with his comeuppance death. Following Trevor's death, Little Mo proceeds to marry his sworn enemy Billy Mitchell (Perry Fenwick), who had grown to care and bond with Little Mo during her ordeal. However, their marriage ends after she is raped by her friend Graham Foster (Alex McSweeney) and then discovers she is pregnant by him. The storyline that signals the end of Little Mo's marriage with Billy contributed to Ainsworth's maternity leave in 2004. The character soon reappears with her baby son, Freddie (Alex and Tom Kilby), and later embarks on an affair with her brother-in-law Alfie Moon (Shane Richie) – which is discovered by her sister Kat (Jessie Wallace), Alfie's wife. Later on, Little Mo develops a relationship with doctor Oliver Cousins (Tom Ellis), though they soon break up after she is accused of hurting Freddie. However, while her family and friends suspect Little Mo to have hurt her son, the real culprit is revealed to be Billy's little cousin Ben Mitchell (Charlie Jones). After breaking up with Oliver and finding herself subject to accusations from her local community, Little Mo leaves Walford in May 2006.

For her portrayal as Little Mo, Ainsworth won several awards including Best Actress at The British Soap Awards in 2002 and 2003.

== Creation and development ==
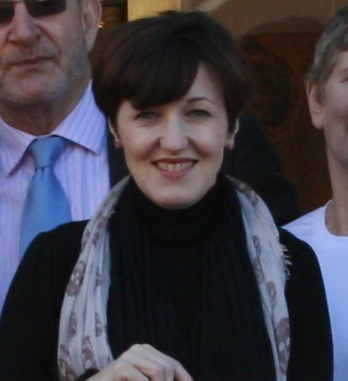
Kacey Ainsworth (pictured in 2011) played Little Mo from 2000–2006.

In January 2000, Ainsworth was one of thirty actresses who auditioned for the role of Little Mo. The character was created as part of the new Slater family. In 2004 Ainsworth took extended leave from the serial. In 2006 Ainsworth announced her decision to leave the serial after six years in order to pursue other projects, she spoke about how much she loved playing Little Mo, but knew there was life outside of the serial. In 2010 Ainsworth revealed she would return to EastEnders if asked.

BBC publicity describe Little Mo as being "timid" and the complete opposite of the loud wheeler-dealer grandmother for whom she was named. They also state: "With a big heart, she was also one of Walford's most legendary victims." Virgin Media describe her as a "shy and retiring" type.

Ainsworth later stated she was grateful for the support the character had received. She revealed that people still associate her with the character, adding that she was not embarrassed; it meant that she had made Little Mo memorable. She branded Little Mo "a lovely character" who was "a labour of love created over a long period of time.".

== Storylines ==
Little Mo first arrived on Albert Square on 18 September 2000, along with her family: father Charlie (Derek Martin), grandmother Big Mo (Laila Morse) and sisters Lynne (Elaine Lordan), Kat (Jessie Wallace) and Zoe (Michelle Ryan), although Zoe is later revealed to be Kat's secret daughter following a family argument. They are also accompanied by Lynne's boyfriend Garry Hobbs (Ricky Groves) and later joined by Little Mo's estranged husband Trevor Morgan (Alex Ferns), a handyman who surprises Little Mo with his arrival just days before they celebrate Christmas that year. It soon becomes clear that their marriage had previously been troubled, due to Trevor being physically and mentally abusive towards her as a result of his severe mood swings and violent temper. This is further evident when Little Mo tries to leave her husband, but he deceives her into staying with him and proceeds to isolates his wife from her family – who despise Trevor due to his abusive nature. She always forgives him and even agrees to start a family. However, when he rapes her after she buys a hat to wear to Lynne's wedding which he has forbidden her from attending, she realizes she cannot bring a child into such an environment and goes back on the contraceptive pill. She finally leaves Trevor when she discovers he had deleted a message from Zoe, who has run away from home. Eventually, Little Mo attacks Trevor, hitting him with an iron when he attacks her. She goes home thinking he is dead, but when she and her sisters return to the scene, he is gone. Little Mo is prosecuted and found guilty of attempted murder but is released after Trevor does a deal with the Slaters: he will not give evidence against Little Mo, if Kat does not press charges against him for assaulting her.

After Little Mo moves out and has to divorce Trevor, he terrorises her and takes her and Sean, his son with Donna Andrews (Paula Jennings), hostage in the Slater home, which catches fire. Fireman Tom Banks (Colm Ó Maonlaí) saves Little Mo and Sean. He goes back for Trevor but the fire explodes a can of petrol. Tom and Trevor die in the explosion, ending his reign of terror.

Billy Mitchell (Perry Fenwick) and Little Mo bond over their respective abusive pasts. They become friends while Little Mo is married to Trevor and start dating after she is released from prison. Billy reveals his feelings during Trevor's trial when Mo admits that part of her reason for staying with Trevor was that he was the only man who ever noticed her that way. Trevor does his best to wreck things but Billy proposes by spelling out "MARRY ME" in alphabet macaroni and she accepts. After Trevor's comeuppance demise, the pair marry on Christmas Day 2002.

Little Mo fights back against Trevor (2001)

Late one night shortly before their first wedding anniversary, Little Mo is raped by her crossword buddy, Graham Foster (Alex McSweeney), in The Queen Victoria public house. When she tells her family, Charlie attacks Graham. Little Mo is tested for STIs after reporting him to the police. All the tests come back negative except one: she is pregnant. The Slaters and Billy are shocked and disgusted when she refuses to have a termination, claiming the baby is innocent of its father's crimes, so she and Billy separate. She leaves the Square, returning for Graham's trial. She tells Billy she named her son Frederick William Mitchell, wanting to name him after good men. She and Billy reconcile after Graham's conviction, but later leaves him again after he tells her that he cannot accept Freddie as his son, because he is Graham's.

Little Mo and Freddie move back in with her family. She and brother-in-law Alfie Moon (Shane Richie) become much closer following their respective separations but they end things when Mo learns Alfie is dating Kat behind her back. Alfie and Kat reconcile and leave the Square. Around February 2006, Little Mo is seen struggling to cope with Freddie's constant crying but refuses to medicate him for his teething, so she has trouble getting him to sleep. Freddie gets a head injury in a fight with Bobby Beale (Kevin Curran) so a health visitor visits the Slaters. Little Mo is extremely hostile, seeing this as a questioning of her parenting ability. She constantly takes Freddie to see general practitioner, Oliver Cousins (Tom Ellis), who moves her to another GP's patient list because he is interested in her romantically. They start dating in April 2006.

Following her divorce, Little Mo and Oliver plan a night away in Brighton, but after a car crash caused by Deano Wicks (Matt Di Angelo) and Carly Wicks (Kellie Shirley), she gets cold feet, telling Oliver that she cannot leave Freddie. On her return, she finds him unconscious. Freddie is rushed to hospital, where doctors find another head injury, and Social Services suspect Little Mo. Thinking back, Little Mo realises Ben Mitchell (Charlie Jones) is responsible. She confronts him and shakes him violently when he denies hurting him. Little Mo tries telling people that Ben caused Freddie's injury but no one believes her, not even her own father. Charlie soon realises his mistake and begs her forgiveness for doubting her. After extensive tests, the doctors discover Freddie has a low platelet count due to an infection, meaning that any minor injury can cause serious complications as his blood does not clot properly. Little Mo is cleared by the authorities, but local residents think she is responsible.

Knowing she will always be suspected, Little Mo decides to leave. Feeling guilty, Ben finally tells his father Phil Mitchell (Steve McFadden) that he had hit Freddie, as Freddie pulled at his hearing aid. Little Mo is not sure what to do, but decides not to tell the authorities. Phil threatens Little Mo but she tells him she is quite capable of deciding for herself. Oliver suggests she report Ben but she refuses, leading to a nasty scene in the pub when Peggy Mitchell (Barbara Windsor) calls Little Mo a child beater. Oliver defends Little Mo and tells everyone that Ben confessed to Phil and Little Mo, but Little Mo is angry that he did not respect her decision. When Little Mo's cousin Stacey (Lacey Turner) spots a romantic spark between Oliver and resident Dawn Swann (Kara Tointon), she tells Little Mo, resulting in a showdown between Little Mo and Oliver in the square. During a scuffle, Little Mo pushes Oliver to the ground, and in response, he ends their relationship.

As Little Mo prepares to leave for Barnstaple, Oliver realises that he still loves her, and decides to ask her to go with him to Leeds instead. He runs to the tube station and tries to convince her to join him. However, Little Mo rejects him, saying that all her life she had done just what she was told by somebody else and now she finally wants to break away from being "Little Mo." She gives him one last kiss, telling him she will keep in touch and visit him in Leeds. She leaves with Freddie on 26 May 2006, and Oliver leaves for Leeds the same day.

In January 2016, Little Mo attends her father Charlie's funeral off-screen, and avoids Kat, along with their other sisters. In September 2022, a grown-up Freddie (now played by Bobby Brazier), returns to Walford believing that Billy is his father. Billy goes along with Freddie's assumptions to spare him from heartache, until Billy's ex-wife Honey Mitchell (Emma Barton) phones Little Mo and urges her to tell Freddie the truth. Freddie is upset when Phil tells him that Billy is not his father. In August 2023, Freddie visits Little Mo off-screen after learning the truth about Graham and how the incident with her led to his birth. He confronts her for not telling him, resulting in a row between them. Little Mo is left devastated by the revelation that Freddie knows the truth about his father. Kat and Jean Slater (Gillian Wright) later visit her in Barnstaple to comfort her.

== Reception ==
In 2002 readers of OK! magazine voted Little Mo as their "top TV character" of the year. For her portrayal of Little Mo, Ainsworth was nominated in the "Best Actress" category at the 2002 British Soap Awards. Ainsworth won two "Best Actress" awards at the Inside Soap Awards and TV Quick Awards. She won the "Most Popular Actress" award at the National Television Awards. While in 2005 she received another nomination for "Best Actress" at the British Soap Awards.

Further, Little Mo is featured on Virgin Media's compilation of the all-time 'catfights' and praised for daring to take on her volatile sister Kat. When the website compiled a list of the best-ever EastEnders moments, they chose Little Mo attacking Trevor with the iron, stating: "After years of abuse from her evil husband, viewers cheered when Little Mo finally put an end to their marriage." Entertainment website Digital Spy also chose the moment Mo hit Trevor with the iron as one of their best ever Eastenders moments. Little Mo was profiled in Karen Boyle's book "Media and violence: gendering the debates", which discussed her rape ordeal and her abuse by Trevor. Upon watching Little Mo's early appearances, a columnist for Soaplife said that she had "Kath's Cafe written all over her. Either that or she could share a market stall – and maybe more – with Mark."

In 2008, All About Soap included Little Mo and Trevor's domestic abuse plot in their list of "top ten taboo" storylines of all time. Their writer described it as one of the "taboos which have bravely been broken by soaps."
