= Trevor Morgan (EastEnders) =

Fictional character

- EastEnders character
- Portrayed by: Alex Ferns
- Duration: 2000–2002
- First appearance: Episode 2045; 21 December 2000
- Last appearance: Episode 2404; 1 November 2002
- Created by: Tony Jordan
- Introduced by: John Yorke
In-universe information
- Occupation: Road worker Barman
- Wife: Little Mo Slater (until 2002)
- Sons: Sean Andrews

Trevor Morgan is a fictional character from the BBC soap opera EastEnders, played by Alex Ferns. He first made a two-episode stint on 21 and 26 December 2000 before reappearing as a regular cast member and gradually the show's main antagonist from 17 April 2001 to his last appearance on 1 November 2002.

The character was introduced as the estranged husband of Little Mo Slater (Kacey Ainsworth), whom he had domestically abused and mistreated throughout most of his duration on the series. This escalates up to the point where he rapes Little Mo and, after attempting to do so again on New Year's Eve 2001, ends up having her wrongfully imprisoned for attacking him with an iron in self-defense that night. During that time, Trevor frequently clashes with Little Mo's family and proceeds to spark a feud with both her sister Kat (Jessie Wallace) and love interest Billy Mitchell (Perry Fenwick). After Trevor is set up into having Little Mo released from prison, his story arc concludes with the character attempting to kill his ex-wife and son Sean by setting fire to their house on Halloween Night 2002; however, they are rescued by their neighbour Tom Banks (Colm Ó Maonlaí) and Trevor is consequently killed alongside Tom when the building explodes.

== Development ==
In her book Media and violence: gendering the debates, Karen Boyle states that Trevor's introduction to EastEnders follows a theme in British soap operas whereby abusive characters are never completely integrated into the soap community. Trevor's first appearance in EastEnders occurs months after the introduction of the core Slater family, and he is never given a permanent home on Albert Square. Boyle observes that Trevor's status as an outsider means that he is also expelled from the community with relative ease, and that there is "a whiff of divine justice" about his eventual death. In Social issues in television fiction, Lesley Henderson furthers the assessment of Trevor as an outsider with the observation that he was one of very few Scottish characters in the soap's history, and the sole Scottish character at the time.

Ferns was surprised by the storyline which saw Trevor rape Little Mo, opining that EastEnders's executive producer John Yorke "really put his neck on the line by doing it." He found the rape and Christmas attack the most difficult scenes of his career, but found Trevor easier to play as he gained a better psychological understanding of the character. Ainsworth found the Christmas scenes equally difficult, and told Cosmopolitan magazine: "Even though I'm an actress, at that point when I was on the floor, I felt totally and utterly humiliated and sick. I felt Little Mo's degradation at having her head shoved into a plate of food. What was more frightening was I knew this scene could have been real, that it's all part of the power game these men play to make women feel as if they're worthless." At one time, Ferns considered leaving the acting profession to become a counsellor, but felt that he was prevented from doing so by Trevor's high profile, explaining: "It's difficult enough for people who are grieving without Trevor walking in."

== Storylines ==
Trevor Morgan first arrived in Albert Square, Walford, along with his wife Little Mo Slater (Kacey Ainsworth) in December 2000 to celebrate Christmas with her family, three months after they had moved there. They were getting back together at this time, as she had previously left him after he had beaten her.

Trevor promises to cease his violence towards her, but it isn’t long before he is beating and humiliating her again. By September 2001, he and Little Mo are living in the B&B in Albert Square. He is regularly apologetic after attacking her but continues to isolate her from her family; with her sister Kat (Jessie Wallace) being particularly resentful over the situation.

After months of talk about Trevor's treatment of Little Mo, he is finally seeing being violent towards her in October 2001 – after suspecting that there was friction within Little Mo's family and she refused to tell him what was happening. He then burnt her with an iron, and a few days later managed to intimidate her into admitting that Kat's younger sister Zoe (Michelle Ryan) was actually her daughter – as a result of Kat being sexually abused by their uncle Harry Slater (Michael Elphick) when she was a teenager. When Trevor discovers Little Mo plans to join Kat in helping their sister Lynne Hobbs (Elaine Lordan) celebrate her wedding in late 2001, even though she agreed not to do that on his behalf earlier on, he rapes her as a punishment. When she arrives late for Christmas dinner, he pushes her face into her plate and forces her to eat the remains from the carpet. Hours later, he beats Little Mo up after discovering her contraceptive pills, which she had secretly been taking in order to avoid becoming pregnant by him.

Little Mo's family constantly implore her to leave her husband, despising his treatment of her. Trevor frequently rows with Kat and is attacked by her father Charlie (Derek Martin) in front a packed pub when he learns that Trevor burned Little Mo's hand with an iron. When Little Mo finally leaves Trevor just after Christmas 2001, when she discovers he deleted a message from a runaway Zoe, he tries to win her back. She resists and he becomes violent, attempting to rape her again. Little Mo hits Trevor over the head with an iron in self-defence, knocking him unconscious. Little Mo believes she has killed him, but when she and her family return to dispose of Trevor's body, they find out he has gone. Trevor is revealed to have survived the attack and left the house where he soon lost consciousness and collapsed, and was admitted to a hospital. When he recovers, he reports Little Mo to the police and has her charged with attempted murder, although she is released on bail until the trial in April 2002.

Despite strong evidence of domestic violence, corroborated by Trevor's mistress Donna Andrews (Paula Jennings), the mother of his baby son, Sean, the jury at her trial find Little Mo guilty of attempted murder and she is sentenced to eight years in prison. Following Little Mo's imprisonment, Donna also finds herself on the receiving end of Trevor’s violence and ends up in hospital. Kat cares for Sean, but Trevor arrives at the Slater family home, determined to take his son. When Kat stands in his way, Trevor attacks her, knocking her to the ground. The police arrive and arrest him, but Trevor makes a deal with Kat, agreeing to retract his statement against Little Mo in return for Kat not pressing charges against him. Little Mo is subsequently released from prison on appeal and she soon begins dating Trevor's love rival Billy Mitchell (Perry Fenwick). Unable to accept this, Trevor attempts to win Little Mo back and is nice to her both in private and in public but Mo rebuffs his attempts to get close to her.

He resorts to dating Billy's cousin Sam (Kim Medcalf) – only to be later dumped when she discovers his violent and controlling behaviour. Mo is happy when Trevor announces he is moving to Glasgow and she agrees to have a goodbye drink with him in the Vic. But he deliberately leaves his plane ticket behind so Mo will find them and return them to him. However once he has her in his room, he reveals the ticket is hers and that she is coming with him. He tells her she is never going to be free of him and he threatens to kill her if she attempts to marry Billy. Trevor starts to stalk Little Mo and breaks into her and Billy's house when he thinks she is by herself. He tries to scare her into calling off the divorce but Billy and Paul stop him, having baited him to enter the house. Finally Trevor is ostracised by the whole of Walford and he walks into the pub to see Mo has accepted Billy's marriage proposal. Billy offers him a drink to see him off, and he says "To whatever the future may hold" before leaving. Seemingly free of Trevor, Billy and Little Mo celebrate their engagement at Angie's Den.

Trevor then returns, enters the party in a costume and keeping a low profile, before he grabs Little Mo. Taking her and his son hostage in the Slater family home he attempts to kill them all, but Little Mo stands up to Trevor by saying she is not frightened of him. He had already tracked his former mistress Donna down to her new address in Swindon, having beaten her up and snatched their son before heading back to Walford.

Trevor lights a match threatens to start a house fire but Little Mo boasts that he does not have the guts. In a fit of rage, Trevor grabs Little Mo, causing the match to drop and a fire to start. Little Mo and Sean are rescued by her neighbour Tom Banks (Colm Ó Maonlaí); however, when going back for Trevor, both men are killed when the house explodes and the dark days of Trevor are over with once and for all. Little Mo begins to plan a funeral for Trevor, but is convinced by Donna that she should be mourning Tom instead. This leads to Little Mo's family, including Billy, being angered at Little Mo after all the treatment Trevor has given her. However, when she attempts to get rid of his ashes, she says to Kat that she does not want to scatter them, as it is an act of remembrance and she does not want to remember him, which makes Kat proud of her sister. Later on, she tells Billy in the café, that she saw a new chapter of her life and the doors to her previous one closing when the curtains closed on the coffin.

== Reception ==
Ferns won six awards for his portrayal of Trevor, and was nominated for a further four. In 2002, he was named Most Hated Soap Villain by readers of What's On TV magazine, with 21% of the votes. He won Best Newcomer and Villain of the Year at the 2002 British Soap Awards, Best Actor at the 2002 Inside Soap Awards, and both Best Soap Newcomer and Best Soap Storyline for Trevor's abuse of Little Mo at the 2002 TV Quick and TV Choice Awards. He was also nominated for Most Popular Actor at the 2002 National Television Awards, and Best Actor, Villain of the Year and Best Storyline, again for Trevor's abuse of Little Mo, at the 2003 British Soap Awards. Karen Price of the Western Mail wrote in 2008 that Ferns as Trevor had "some of the most dramatic scenes in the history of EastEnders". The domestic abuse storyline received critical commendation for its "sensitive account" of sexual violence, however was also condemned for "symbolising the descent of popular television into distressing and inappropriate material." Boyle gave the storyline a mixed review, writing that Little Mo's attempted murder conviction served to highlight the inequities of the legal system, yet undermined "the more mundane, persistent realities of domestic violence that the soap – patterned on repetition and the deferral of closure – is otherwise well positioned to deal with." In 2012, Digital Spy listed Trevor as one of the "scariest TV characters of all time", saying he "gave plenty of soaps fans nightmares."

"We have [...] no wish to declare particular subjects off limits. We carefully consider each case on its merits, in the context of the audience expectations which have been built up, and having regard also to the general limits understood by the watershed concept. The issue here was not the quality or sensitivity of the drama, but only its scheduling."

— Lord Dubs, chairman of the Broadcasting Standards Commission, on the Trevor-Little Mo domestic abuse storyline.

The episode in which Trevor attacked Little Mo over Christmas dinner was watched by 14.5 million viewers, and voted 57th in Channel 4's 100 Greatest Scary Moments. The storyline attracted so many complaints from the public that the Broadcasting Standards Commission undertook their first study of sex and violence in soap operas in twenty years. The Commission ruled that the Christmas episode, as well as the New Year's Eve 2001 episode in which Little Mo retaliated by attacking Trevor with an iron, should not have been broadcast before the 9 pm watershed. It was felt that the latter episode had a "stark and graphic quality unsuitable for pre-watershed transmission", and while the BSC stated that scenes of domestic abuse were permissible, there were "concern[s] about the intense, disturbing and protracted nature of the scenes portraying Trevor's attacks on Mo". A spokesperson for the BBC defended the scenes as "developments in well-established storylines". They claimed the depiction of abuse was consistent for the series, and that EastEnders viewers expected that seasonal episodes such as Christmas and New Year would always be "overshadowed by crises".

Ferns received a death threat whilst working on EastEnders, believed by police to have been sent from a "crazed fan". He was told to take extra security precautions, including leaving the EastEnders set via the back exit, and not travelling alone. Ferns was surprised by the strength of reactions to his role, and assessed that it was because of the domestic abuse: "You can have violence on screen and it's kind of an everyday thing but there's something about a man hitting a woman, within the confines of their own home, that people find hard to take." The aggression directed at him by members of the public intensified following Little Mo's imprisonment, forcing Ferns to wear a disguise when travelling on the London Underground. In 2008, All About Soap included Trevor and Little Mo's domestic violence plot in their list of "top ten taboo" storylines of all time. Their writer described it as one of the "taboos which have bravely been broken by soaps."

In 2020, Sara Wallis and Ian Hyland from The Daily Mirror placed Trevor 95th on their ranked list of the best EastEnders characters of all time, calling him "Evil" and his abuse "violent". In February 2025, Radio Times ranked Trevor as the 4th best EastEnders villain, with Laura Denby writing that Ferns' performance was "chilling" and that Trevor's abuse storyline "[set] the benchmark for every future plot of [its] kind".

== See also ==
- List of soap opera villains
