= Colm Ó Maonlaí =

Irish actor (born 1966)

- Born: 10 December 1966 (age 59); Ireland
- Occupation: Actor
- Relatives: Liam Ó Maonlaí (brother)

Colm Ó Maonlaí (born 10 December 1966) is an Irish actor, best known for playing Tom Banks in EastEnders from April to November 2002. He has also played roles in The Bill and Doctors. He also had a brief spell playing the tin whistle in Shane MacGowan's band, The Popes.

He is a brother of Irish musician, Liam Ó Maonlaí.

== Filmography ==
=== Film ===
| Year | Title | Role | Notes |
|---|---|---|---|
| 1998 | Middleton's Changeling | Alsemero | |
| 1999 | Knocking on Death's Door | Young Doc Hadley | |
| 1999 | I Could Read the Sky | Martin | |
| 1999 | The Haunting of Hell House | Reginald | |
| 2002 | Chaos | Barry the Factory Manager | |
| 2003 | A Place to Stay | Seán | |

=== Television ===
| Year | Title | Role | Notes |
|---|---|---|---|
| 2000–2001 | Ros na Rún | Cathal Ó Fiannachta | 15 episodes |
| 2002 | EastEnders | Tom Banks | 74 episodes |
| 2004 | Doctors | Steve Welland | Episode: "A Secret Life" |
| 2004 | The Bill | Sean Flynn | Episode: "The Cold Winter Blues" |
| 2006–2008 | Fair City | Detective Rory Goff | 5 episodes |
| 2013 | Deception | Dara Baker | 3 episodes |
