= Kacey Ainsworth =

English actress (born 1968)

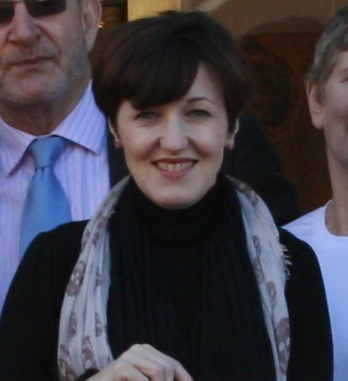
- Ainsworth in 2013
- Born: 19 October 1968 (age 57); Ware, Hertfordshire, England
- Occupation: Actress
- Years active: 1995–present
- Spouse: Darren Hales (m. 2005; div. 2023)
- Children: 2

Kacey Ainsworth (born 19 October 1968) is an English actress, known for her roles as Little Mo in the BBC soap opera EastEnders (2000–2006) and Cathy Keating in the ITV drama series Grantchester (2014–present).

== Early life ==
Upon finishing senior school, Ainsworth secured a job at the advertising firm Saatchi & Saatchi. She went on to train at the Royal Central School of Speech and Drama, completing a BA (Hons) in Acting.

== Career ==
Ainsworth began her career at the age of nine, playing orphan Tessie in the original West End run of Annie from 1978 to 1981. She returned to acting in the 1990s, appearing in various guest parts on television and as Miss Fitzherbert in Mike Leigh's Oscar-nominated musical drama Topsy-Turvy (1999), before joining the cast of the BBC soap opera EastEnders, where she played Little Mo—a member of the Slater family—between September 2000 and May 2006. The storyline in which her character endured a prolonged campaign of abuse at the hands of her husband has since been recognised as one of the most powerful depictions of domestic violence in British television history, with Ainsworth commenting that the role often left her physically and emotionally drained.

Since leaving EastEnders, Ainsworth has appeared in a string of guest roles on series such as Hotel Babylon, Midsomer Murders, Casualty, Doctors, Call the Midwife, Moving On, Shakespeare & Hathaway, and The Madame Blanc Mysteries. She also starred as Inspector Jenny Black in the BBC's HolbyBlue (2007–2008), appeared in the recurring role of Miss Gullet on the debut season of CBBC's The Worst Witch (2017), and played a supporting role in the acclaimed film Lynn + Lucy (2019). She has co-starred as Cathy Keating in the ITV detective drama Grantchester since 2014, writing an episode for its ninth season in 2025.

On stage, Ainsworth starred in touring productions of The Taming of the Shrew (1998), Calendar Girls (2011–2012), and Steel Magnolias (2012). In 2019, her portrayal of Mrs. Lovett in Stephen Sondheim's Sweeney Todd—at the Everyman Theatre—drew praise, with Michael Billington of The Guardian calling it an "outstanding performance".

== Filmography ==
Year	Title	Role	Notes
1995	Peak Practice	Julia	Episode: "Walking Away"
1995	Under the Moon	Sarah	Television film
1996	A Touch of Frost	Carole Nash	Episode: "The Things We Do for Love"
1996	Accused	Rosie Murray	Episode: "Billy"
1996	The Moonstone	Drusilla Clack	Television film
1996–1997	The Bill	Paula Sheriton / Gail Painter	2 episodes
1997	Cone Zone	Loretta	4 episodes
1997	The Beggar Bride	Tina	Main cast; 2 episodes
1998	Touch and Go	Val	Television film
1998	Where the Heart Is	Tracey	Episode: "Love"
1999	Topsy-Turvy	Miss Dorothea Fitzherbert	Feature film
2000	Happy Birthday Shakespeare	Rita	Television film
2000	Safe as Houses	Jan	Television film
2000–2006	EastEnders	Little Mo Mitchell	Series regular; 552 episodes
2001	Girl from Rio	Sales Assistant	Feature film
2007	Hotel Babylon	Maria Henson	Episode #2.1
2007–2008	HolbyBlue	Inspector Jenny Black	Main cast; 14 episodes
2010	Rock & Chips	Edna	Episode: "Five Gold Rings"
2011	M.I. High	Margaret Fontana	Episode: "Bully Elliot"
2011	Tracy Beaker Returns	Xanthe	Episode: "Grandad"
2011	Midsomer Murders	Nikki Rowntree	Episode: "Echos of the Dead"
2013	The Wright Way	Valerie Wright	Main cast; 5 episodes
2014	Casualty	DS Annie Reardon	Episode: "Valves to Vagrants"
2014	Doctors	Ruby Slade	Episode: "Snowbabies"
2014	Call the Midwife	Nancy	Episode: "Christmas Special"
2014–present	Grantchester	Cathy Keating	Main cast; 65 episodes
2016	Agatha Raisin	Francie Juddle	Episode: "Witch of Wyckhadden"
2017	The Worst Witch	Miss Gullet	Recurring; 12 episodes
2017–2018	Loose Women	Self/Guest Panellist	3 episodes
2018	We the Kings	Susan	Feature film
2019	Lynn + Lucy	Caroline	Feature film
2020	Moving On	Vicky	Episode: "Second Sight"
2020	Then & Now	Claire	3 episodes; also co-writer
2021	The Battersea Poltergeist	Lily Chibbett (voice)	Podcast; 3 episodes
2021	Torchwood	Jill Kerr (voice)	Podcast; episode: "The Five People You Kill in Middlesbrough"
2021	Sliced	Denise	Episode: "Mad Innit?"
2021	The Mallorca Files	Linda Ball	Episode: "The Blue Feather"
2023	Doctor Who: The Sixth Doctor Adventures	Beryl (voice)	Podcast; episode: "Girl in a Bubble"
2024	Whitstable Pearl	Cassie	Episode: "Death, the Devil and the Fool"
2025	Shakespeare & Hathaway: Private Investigators	Jane Folle	Episode: "A Rose by Any Other Name"
2025	The Madame Blanc Mysteries	Aurielle Alfonse	Episode: "Christmas Special"

== Theatre ==
Year	Film	Role	Notes
1978–1981	Annie	Tessie	Victoria Palace Theatre
1995	Pale Horse	Lucy	Royal Court Theatre
1996	Serving It Up	Teresa	Bush Theatre
1997	Attempts on Her Life	Girl	Royal Court Theatre
1998	The Taming of the Shrew	Kate	UK tour
1999	Sleep With Me	Lorraine	Royal National Theatre
2006	The Exonerated	Guest Lead	Riverside Studios
2009	Carrie's War	Auntie Lou	Apollo Theatre
2011–2012	Calendar Girls	Miss November	UK tour
2012	Steel Magnolias	Annelle	UK tour
2013	Laughton	Elsa Lanchester	Stephen Joseph Theatre
2015	Feed the Beast	Sally	Birmingham Repertory Theatre
2018	Holes	Warden	Nottingham Playhouse
2019	Sweeney Todd	Mrs. Lovett	Everyman Theatre
2022	Lava	Vicky	Soho Theatre
2023	Little Women	Marmee	HOME
2024	Leaves of Glass	Liz	Park Theatre
2024	Jab	Anne	Finborough Theatre

== Awards ==
- British Soap Awards – Best Actress (Winner, 2002; 2003)
- National Television Awards – Most Popular Actress (Winner, 2002)
- Inside Soap Awards – Best Actress (Winner, 2002)
- TV Choice Awards – Best Soap Actress (Winner, 2002)
