= Alex Ferns =

British actor (born 1968)

- Born: 13 October 1968 (age 58); Lennoxtown, Stirlingshire, Scotland
- Education: University of Cape Town
- Occupation: Actor
- Years active: 1993–present
- Television: EastEnders; River City
- Spouse: Jennifer Woodburne (m. 1996)
- Children: 2

Alexander Ferns (born 13 October 1968) is a Scottish actor and television personality. His role in EastEnders as Trevor Morgan from 2000 to 2002 was described as "Britain's most-hated soap villain". He also played the role of Rick Harper in the BBC Scotland soap opera River City between 2017 and 2018. For his performance as coal miner Andrei Glukhov in the 2019 miniseries Chernobyl he received a BAFTA Scotland Award.

== Early life and education ==
Alex Ferns is the oldest of three children of his family, who left Scotland for South Africa, when Ferns was eleven years old. The family took up residence in Secunda, where Ferns' father worked as an electrician during the construction of a power plant. After he finished school, he joined the South African Defence Force and fought in Angola between 1987 and 1989. Afterward he studied drama at the University of Cape Town. In the mid 1990s, he moved back to the United Kingdom and started his career in acting.

== Career ==
Ferns made an appearance in The Ghost and the Darkness (1996) before various television roles, including Trevor Morgan in the BBC soap opera EastEnders from 2000 to 2002, for which he won the British Soap Award for Best Newcomer. In 2005, Ferns played Lieutenant Gordon in the highly acclaimed trilingual film Joyeux Noël, which was nominated for Best Foreign Language Film at the Oscars, Golden Globe Awards and the BAFTAs.

In 2003, Ferns appeared as Draco Malfoy in a Harry Potter sketch for Comic Relief. In 2004, he played Commander Martin Brooke, the lead role, in the short-lived ITV series Making Waves. In the same year he appeared in Man Dancin', a Festival Film & TV production, which won a number of awards on the festival circuit, including Outstanding Original Screenplay at the Sacramento Film Festival. He has also appeared on Coronation Street. He has also appeared in the 2006 film Shadow Man, as Schmitt, also starring Steven Seagal.

His theatrical work includes the role of the "tapeworm" (a hallucination) in I.D., a play about Dimitri Tsafendas and his assassination of South African Prime Minister Hendrik Verwoerd, the 2008 national tour of Agatha Christie's murder mystery And Then There Were None, and Little Shop of Horrors as the Dentist. In 2011, he took the role of Scottish gangster Jimmy Boyle in the play about his life, The Hardman, during a Scottish tour to positive reviews.

He also made a brief appearance in a Smirnoff Vodka advert in 2009.

Ferns took part in television series Celebrity Coach Trip, partnered with friend Ricky Groves. He starred as Luther in the 2011 London revival and subsequent UK tour of South Pacific.

In 2013, he starred as Lee in True West at Glasgow's Citizen's Theatre. In 2014, he starred in 24: Live Another Day. In 2016, Ferns starred in ITV's Vera series 6 episode 4 ("The Sea Glass") as Michael Quinn. He also appeared in the BBC's Wallander series 4 episode 1 ("The White Lioness") as Axel Hedeman.

He portrayed the leader of Tula coal miners Andrei Glukhov in the HBO 2019 miniseries Chernobyl. For this performance, he received a BAFTA Scotland Award for Best Actor in Television.

Ferns appeared in Netflix's The Irregulars (2021) as Vic Collins. He portrayed Gotham Police Commissioner Pete Savage in the superhero film The Batman (2022). Also in 2022, he appeared in the Disney+ series Andor as Sergeant Linus Mosk.

In 2024, Ferns appeared as Aaron Moy in the BBC One thriller series Nightsleeper.

== Filmography ==
=== Film ===
Year	Title	Role	Notes
1996	The Ghost and the Darkness	Stockton	
2003	Man Dancin'	Jimmy Kerrigan	
2005	Joyeux Noël	Lieutenant Gordon	
2009	Farewell	Scottish Agent	
2014	True West	Lee	
2015	Caring for the Recently Deceased	Solicitor	Short
2015	Legend	McLean	
2016	Hot Property	J.P. De Cock	
2016	The Legend of Tarzan	Force Publique Officer	
2017	Baby Mine	Mike	Short
2017	Romans	Jo	Released as Retaliation in the U.S.
2020	Knuckledust	Major Vaughn	
2021	Wrath of Man	John (Sticky John)	
2022	The Batman	Commissioner Pete Savage	
2024	Godzilla x Kong: The New Empire	Mikael	

=== Television ===
Year	Title	Role	Notes
1993	Generations		TV series
1996	Rhodes	John Grimmer	Miniseries, 6 episodes
1997	Tarzan: The Epic Adventures	Jimmy Dorgo	1 episode
1997	Black Velvet Band	Major Watson	TV film
1998	The Bill	Johno	1 episode
1999	Psychos	Policeman	Miniseries, 1 episode
1999	Taggart	Lenny Kerr	1 episode
2000	Britannic	Stoker Evans	TV film
2000	Holby City	Stuart	1 episode
2000	Doctors	Dan Thomas	1 episode
2000–2002	EastEnders	Trevor Morgan	119 episodes
2001	Randall & Hopkirk (Deceased)	Mad Alex	1 episode
2001–2002	De 9 dagen van de gier	Brian	TV series
2003	Harry Potter And The Secret Chamberpot Of Azerbaijan	Draco Malfoy	Red Nose Day: Harry Potter Spoof
2004	Making Waves	Commander Martin Brooke	Main role, 6 episodes
2006	Dream Team 80's	Al Mackay	Miniseries, 2 episodes
2006	Ancient Rome: The Rise and Fall of an Empire	Mark Antony	Miniseries, 1 episode
2007	M.I. High	General Scarp	1 episode
2007	Casualty	Tom Dart	1 episode
2014	The Widower	DCI Neil Thompson	Miniseries, 2 episodes
2014	24: Live Another Day	Radko	Miniseries, 1 episode
2014	The Passing Bells	David Edwards	Miniseries, 3 episodes
2015	The Coroner	Nolan Prince	1 episode
2015	Wallander	Axel Hedeman	1 episode
2016	Vera	Michael Quinn	1 episode
2016	Wolfblood	Alistair	Recurring role, 6 episodes
2017	Taboo	Hall	1 episode
2017–2018	River City	Rick Harper	Recurring role, 9 episodes
2019	Chernobyl	Andrei Glukhov	Miniseries, 1 episode
2020	Barkskins	Gay Bill	4 episodes
2021	The Irregulars	Vic Collins	4 episodes
2021	Danny Boy	Gavin Wood	TV film
2022	Andor	Sergeant Linus Mosk	5 episodes
2022–2024	The Devil's Hour	DS Nick Holness	8 episodes
2023	Six Four	Gordon Byrne	3 episodes
2024	Nightsleeper	Aaron Moy	6 episodes
2026	Waiting for the Out	Keith McKellar	5 episodes
