= Yolande Trueman =

Fictional character from EastEnders

- EastEnders character
- Portrayed by: Angela Wynter
- Duration: 2003–2008, 2017, 2023–present
- First appearance: Episode 2588; 16 September 2003
- Introduced by: Louise Berridge (2003); Sean O'Connor (2017); Chris Clenshaw (2023)
In-universe information
- Occupation: B&B owner; Shopkeeper; Minute Mart Administrator; Laundrette assistant
- Husband: Victor Duke (until 2003); Patrick Trueman (2004–2009, 2025–present)

Yolande Trueman (also Duke) is a fictional character from the BBC soap opera EastEnders, played by Angela Wynter. She first appears in episode 2588, originally broadcast on 16 September 2003. The character is introduced as a love interest for Patrick Trueman (Rudolph Walker). She is characterised as attentive, caring and "principled". Her stories have focused on her marriage to Patrick, and using their characters, producers explored fostering, a feud with Pat Butcher (Pam St Clement), and suffering from being a victim of racism. Wynter was written out of the series in 2008 and Yolande departs in episode 3658, originally broadcast on 3 October 2008. Wynter reprised her role for two guest appearances in 2017. The character is reintroduced in 2023 and returns in episode 6745, originally broadcast on 7 August 2023. The following year, producers used Yolande to explore the topic of sexual assault at the hands of her pastor Gideon Clayton (Howard Saddler).

== Development ==
=== Creation and characterisation ===
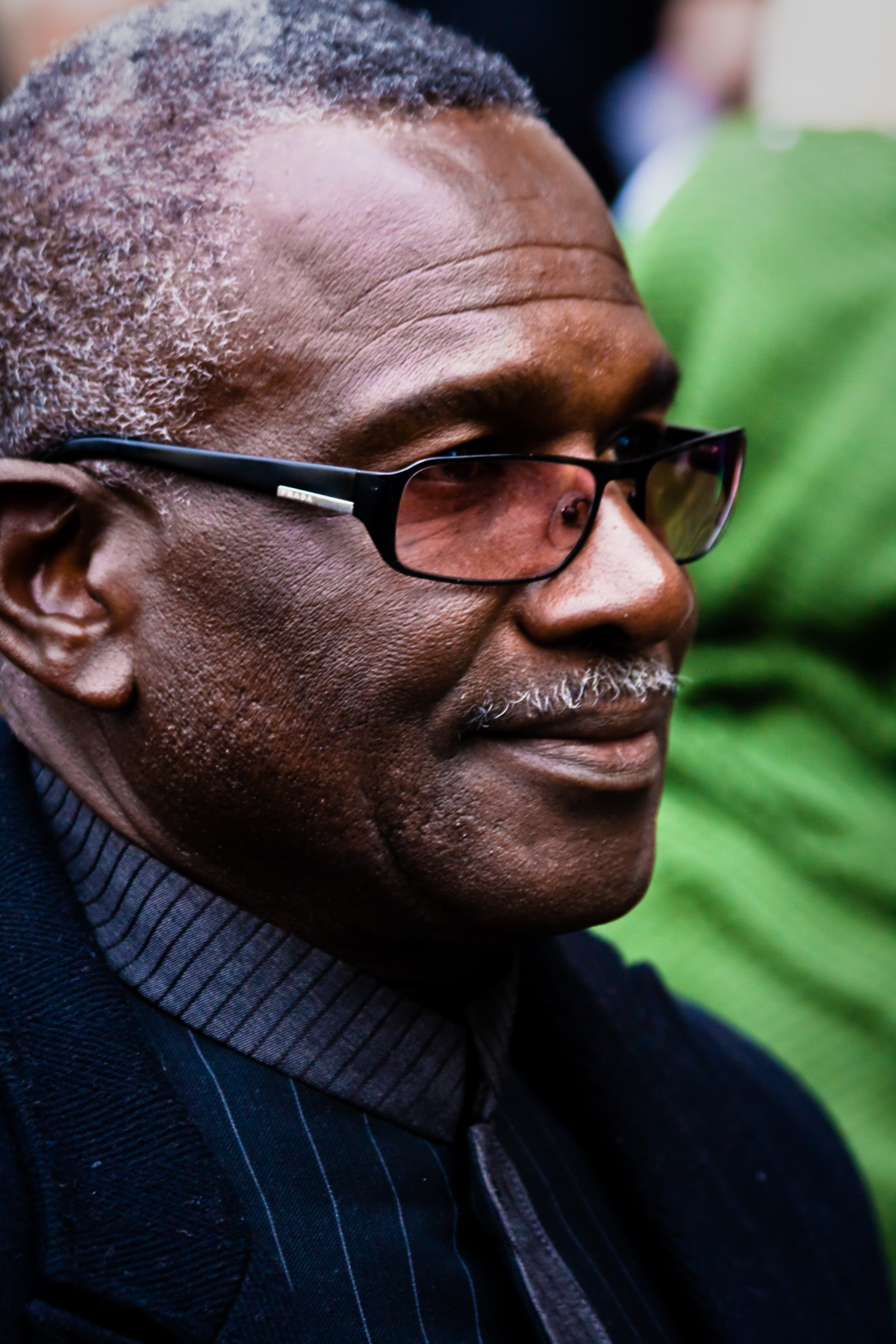
Yolande was introduced as the love interest of Patrick Trueman (Rudolph Walker, pictured)

Yolande Duke was created as a love interest for Patrick Trueman (Rudolph Walker) in 2003. Actress Angela Wynter was cast in the role. Wynter and Walker had previously worked together when appearing in the play Meetings, the former's first acting job. The original character outline for Yolande describes her as "bubbly and positive". Wynter then worked to develop the character and make her more well-rounded. She drew inspiration from her sister Merlene, who had recently died, and incorporated her sister's "gregarious" personality. Yolande is characterised as "a thoughtful, religious woman". She has also been described as assertive with a sassy attitude. Wynter opined that her character is "vulnerable, but she's principled" and has a sense of "toughness". She added that the character provided a representation of woman in the community – "aunts, sisters and mothers". The actress felt a responsibility in portraying her character. The character's backstory states that she experienced a "holiday romance" with Patrick when visiting Trinidad, despite being married to Victor Duke (Ben Thomas).

=== Storyline development ===
The character's most notable story is her relationship with Patrick. Yolande's character profile names her as "the best thing that's happened to Patrick". Wynter explained that Yolande and Patrick are well-suited as they have the "same principles", which Patrick does not "stray too far away from" to avoid upsetting Yolande. The pair run a bed and breakfast together on Albert Square. In 2004, the pair were married in a small on-screen ceremony, followed by a reception in the local pub, The Queen Victoria. Wynter explained that as they have both been married before, they opt for a small ceremony. She enjoyed filming the wedding as it was a day with good weather. The show hired a choir as part of the wedding. Wynter liked this element of the wedding the most and found it "really emotional". She admitted that she would prefer a bigger wedding herself and would not want a reception in the Vic.

In a 2004 interview with the show's publicity team, Wynter expressed a desire to explore Yolande's interactions with children and for more guests in the B&B. In February 2004, it was announced that the Truemans would be at the focus of a fostering storyline as part of the BBC's Taking Care season, which explores different childhoods. In the show, Patrick and Yolande meet a 14-year-old boy, JJ (Daniel Anthony), and support him after learning he is a runaway. The four-episode story arc concludes as the pair then decide to foster children. Walker thought fostering was a reflection of the couple's relationship and believed they wanted to do it because they do not have their own children. He added that the story had the potential to "run and run".

In 2007, executive producer Diederick Santer used Patrick and Yolande to cover a storyline about racism that, according to the producer, was inspired by the 2007 Celebrity Big Brother race row, sparked by the racist bullying of Bollywood actress Shilpa Shetty by UK celebrity Jade Goody. In the storyline, the characters Jay Brown (Jamie Borthwick) and Sean Slater (Rob Kazinsky) used racist phrases to the Truemans, and their reaction to the insults were explored. Santer commented, "The Celebrity Big Brother race row kicked off as I took charge of my first scripts. I thought it was fascinating because it showed there was a real need for a debate about race in Britain. [Big Brother] didn’t do it particularly well, so I thought it could be something EastEnders should do. Our stuff won’t be overly moralistic or preachy but it will tackle this serious issue head on."

=== Departure and returns ===
In June 2008, it was announced that the character would be written out of the series after producers opted not to renew Wynter's contract. They made the decision after struggling to create new stories for the characters. Wynter was disappointed with the reasoning as she felt that "you can always write stories for people to act". Speaking to Jasmine Dotiwala from The Voice, Wynter theorised that her character may have actually been written out due to the show exceeding their black and Asian character 'quota'. The actress was proud of her work as Yolande and thought she was "a part of the fabric of EastEnders". She recognised that Patrick and Yolande's marriage was "the only representation of a black union on British TV", which she was proud of. Wynter confirmed that Yolande would not be killed off and hoped that Patrick would not reignite his affair with Pat Evans (Pam St Clement). Walker was also disappointed with Yolande's departure, but thankful for her stint on the show.

In 2017, Wynter reprised her role as Yolande for a single episode. She appears in episode 5461, first broadcast on 20 March 2017. Her return had not been announced prior to transmission and was a surprise for the audience. In the narrative, Yolande is involved in a disciplinary meeting for Denise Fox (Diane Parish). The character's second return was announced on 20 June 2017 and she appears in episode 5517, first broadcast on 26 June. Yolande features in a story exploring Derek Harkinson's (Ian Lavender) backstory. Writers also included a scene between Yolande and Patrick where they dance on his birthday. Grace Morris from What to Watch felt they had obvious feelings for each other.

=== Reintroduction ===
A return for the character was hinted in scenes broadcast in March 2023 when Patrick decides to seek a reunion with Yolande. Wynter's return was then confirmed on 29 June 2023. The actress expressed her excitement at reprising the role and felt welcomed back to set. She was excited to work opposite Walker again and compared it to "heaven". Chris Clenshaw, the show's executive producer, spoke of his delight at Wynter's return, calling her "immensely talented". He wanted to reunite Yolande with Patrick and believed their reunion was "important" for them. The character returns in episode 6745, originally broadcast on 7 August 2023.

Since her original departure, Yolande has been living in Birmingham with her partner, Anton. Wynter explained that Yolande felt she was moving onto "greener pastures", but has now recognised that Patrick is "the true love of her life" as they love each other "unconditionally". Yolande returns to Walford after her relationship ends and she decides to revisit her relationship with Patrick. This shocks him and he worries about the reunion. Wynter recognised that Patrick "loves her without condition", but his hesitancy surprises her. Writers also revisited the friendship between Yolande and Denise, which Wynter enjoyed. She acknowledged that they have a mutual respect as Denise understands that Yolande is not using Patrick and genuinely loves him, as he does her. The actress was excited to explore her character's position as an older woman in the Trueman-Fox family unit and the wider community. Additionally, Wynter was looking forward to showcasing the "gentleness" and "fragility" in her character's relationship with Patrick. She commented, "It's nice to show an older, loving and sometimes sassy couple growing older together."

=== Sexual assault ===
In December 2023, producers introduced Pastor Gideon Clayton (Howard Saddler) to the series as the pastor at Yolande's church group. Yolande's religion serves as a major part of her characterisation, so writers used this as part of her new story. Over multiple months, a friendship is established between Yolande and Pastor Clayton. Wynter explained that Yolande trusts him because "he's a man of the cloth". Writers challenged the friendship through rumours about the pair's closeness. A show insider explained that other members of the prayer group start "making everyone think that something untoward is going on!"

The friendship between Yolande and Pastor Clayton serves as a build-up to a story exploring sexual harassment as Pastor Clayton abuses his position to make Yolande uncomfortable. When Yolande suggests that the church raise money for a food truck to deliver food to the homeless, the Pastor is impressed and gives Yolande a long hug. Alison Slade from TV Times observed that Pastor Clayton is "inappropriately over-tactile", leaving Yolande "frozen with fear". Yolande initially ignores the moment, but when Pastor Clayton touches her again the next day, she confronts him. He becomes defensive and cancels her food truck plan, isolating her from the project. A show publicity officer told Johnathon Hughes from Inside Soap that the pastor "manipulates the situation to paint [Yolande] as unreasonable". Yolande reaches a point where she feels forced to apologise for confronting the pastor. Wynter explained that Yolande believes that she has sorted the problem and also "believes in the greater good in Pastor Clayton", but has been cautious since.

The plot develops further to explore the impact of sexual assault after Yolande is assaulted by Pastor Clayton. Writers wanted to highlight how someone in a position of power can take advantage and established Pastor Clayton as a serial offender through flashbacks of other women previously assaulted by him. They also planned to consider how elements of Yolande's life is impacted by the assault, including her relationship with Patrick. Wynter thought the story was important to portray as it was a true reflection of people's lives. On playing the story, she commented, "As an actor, I tell stories, and I felt I could tell this story and put a spotlight on this issue." The development was scripted as part of an hour-long special episode. Yolande's assault takes place on the day of her fundraiser. Wynter explained that it is an important day for Yolande and she is proud of her work on the project. She added, "the whole experience has made her feel purposeful". Yolande's work on the fundraiser creates tension between her and Patrick. Wynter told Lewis Knight from Radio Times that Patrick wants more from Yolande than she can provide, but she "promises Patrick that she'll be all his" after the fundraiser.

The show's story team worked with End Violence Against Women Coalition and Hourglass to accurately portray the story. Chris Clenshaw, the show's executive producer, wanted the story to raise awareness about "how women at any age can be groomed by someone in a position of power". Andrea Simon, the director of End Violence Against Women Coalition, praised how the story explores sexual assault with an older, black woman and hoped it would "dispel myths and stereotypes about what victims and survivors look like and how perpetrators behave". Veronica Gray, deputy CEO of Hourglass, called the story "a landmark moment for all older victims of abuse in the UK and beyond". She hoped it would create an open dialogue for the audience around the sexual abuse of older people.

== Storylines ==
=== 2003–2017 ===
Yolande arrives in Albert Square as Patrick Trueman's (Rudolph Walker) holiday romance. They had met during Patrick's visit to his homeland of Trinidad, where the middle-aged couple enjoyed a steamy affair, much the contrary to Yolande's unhappy and stolid marriage to a strict, uptight, and religious Victor (Ben Thomas), whose traditional beliefs objectify women to the purpose of bearing and raising children. Concerned that all Patrick wants is a casual fling, Yolande prepares to return to Trinidad, but is persuaded to stay after Patrick admits he has fallen in love with her. Victor arrives in Walford to take Yolande home, and gives Patrick £10000 to relinquish and allow him to bring his wife back to Trinidad unhindered. Although tempted, he ultimately refuses, and goes to return the money to Victor; however, Yolande spots Patrick with the money in his hand and mistakenly believes that he has accepted Victor’s offer. She leaves for Trinidad alone, taking the £10,000 with her, but returns to Walford upon Victor’s arrival back in Trinidad, settling down and sharing the money with Patrick.

Yolande and Patrick eventually marry, fostering a little girl, Katie (Parhys-Jai Cato). They forge a small business empire in Walford, owning and managing the Minute Mart convenience store, the square’s bed and breakfast and eventually Trueman's Motors. Yolande strikes up a feud with Pat Evans (Pam St Clement) when she starts to become involved in Trueman's Motors, in competition with Pat’s own car dealership. Their rivalry intensifies when Pat begins an affair with Patrick, with their Minute Mart employee Stacey Slater (Lacey Turner) catching them kissing and telling Yolande, causing a brawl in the Queen Victoria public house. Yolande goes to a nightclub to seek revenge in kind on Patrick, and propositions Kevin Wicks (Phil Daniels); he reciprocates, and the pair arrange to go back to his house for sex, but she has second thoughts and backs out. The next day, she confesses to Patrick that she almost had sex with another man, and, albeit reluctantly, decides to give Patrick another chance.

Patrick accidentally turns off the chiller cabinet at the Minute Mart and sells the unrefrigerated food, giving a number of customers food poisoning. Complaints result in a visit from a Minute Mart head office inspector, who is so impressed with Yolande's efforts to clean up the shop that she is subsequently offered a job at the Minute Mart HQ in Birmingham. Yolande accepts with delight and busily prepares for the move, despite Patrick wanting her to stay in Walford. Yolande leaves Walford and, as he waves her off at the tube station, Patrick tells her that once the house is sold he will join her in Birmingham; however, the plan never comes to fruition, and Patrick later receives their divorce papers.

Nine years later, Yolande returns when she attends Denise Fox's (Diane Parish) disciplinary hearing at the Minute Mart HQ, attempting to control the meeting to ensure Denise keeps her job. An argument ensues when Harry Beckett (Mark Bagnall) tells Denise that she needs to go on a training course; however, Denise refuses and quits her job while Yolande says that if anyone needs to go on a course, it should be Harry. Yolande goes to see her former husband Patrick for his birthday, where they dance and reminisce.

=== 2023–present ===
In March 2023, Patrick announces that he is leaving Walford to try and locate Yolande, in an attempt to win her back. Months later, Yolande returns to the square after being kicked out of her ex-partner's property in Birmingham after he found out about Patrick and Yolande's secret affair. Yolande asks Patrick if she can stay with him, but he is reluctant so Yolande decides to leave. Patrick changes his mind and convinces Yolande to remain in Walford. Soon after Yolande' ex-boyfriend Anton (Cavin Cornwall) arrives in Walford and it is revealed that Yolande has been on the run for money that he has stolen from their church, though Anton leaves after exonerating Yolande. Yolande feuds with Elaine Peacock (Harriet Thorpe) over setting up a community carol singing group. When Yolande sees Denzel Danes (Jaden Ladega) being attacked by a group of youths, she attempts to help him but falls and is videoed and posted online.

In Patrick’s absence, Yolande becomes close to Pastor Clayton (Howard Saddler). Their friendship draws suspicion from residents, including Denzel and Yolande's church members. When one of her church members Agatha (Chloe Okora) spreads rumours that Yolande is sleeping with Pastor Clayton, she slaps her. Yolande proposes that the church’s offering should fund a food truck to feed the community. Pastor Clayton agrees with the idea and embraces Yolande by groping her. She grows uncomfortable around Pastor Clayton and when he attempts to touch her again, she expresses her concerns. He then gives the idea to his wife Stella Clayton (Velile Tshabalala). Patrick returns as the food truck idea is being passed back to Yolande, who was gaslighted by Pastor Clayton into believing she made up his harassment. At a fundraiser for the food truck, Pastor Clayton sexually assaults Yolande, and she later confides in Elaine about the attack. Flashbacks reveal that Yolande is not Pastor Clayton's only victim, and that he has been raping and assaulting women across London since 2001. Yolande urges Elaine not to tell anybody about the attack. Yolande’s loved ones become concerned about her withdrawn behaviour and Patrick confides in Pastor Clayton, who tries to manipulate Patrick into believing that Yolande is suffering from dementia. Furious, Yolande eventually reveals to Patrick that Pastor Clayton had sexually assaulted her. Patrick tries to persuade Yolande to report the incident to the police, but she refuses for fear that she will not get justice, so decides to report him to their church minister, Levi (Mark Akintimehin). Levi does not get back to Yolande, causing her to worry. Chelsea asks Yolande to be godmother to her son Jordan (Izaiah Hagan-Brown) and during his baptism, Pastor Clayton gropes her again. Yolande reports him to the police and he is arrested. Pastor Clayton is released due to insufficient evidence, upsetting Yolande. Levi returns and agrees to help Yolande gain justice, and encourages Yolande to once again report Pastor Clayton with Delia Bennett (Llewella Gideon) – another woman who Pastor Clayton had sexually assaulted. More women who Pastor Clayton had assaulted start to speak up, causing him to return to Walford to confront Yolande. After unsuccessfully threatening Yolande into dropping her case against him, he commits suicide. After realising that she will never achieve justice, Yolande has a crisis in faith; however, she recovers it on Christmas Eve 2024 when she meets with the other survivors of Pastor Clayton's abuse.

Yolande helps to serve food to the homeless on Christmas Day, where she meets Nigel Bates (Paul Bradley). Yolande and Nigel become friends, and he reveals to her that he has early-onset dementia. Yolande, alongside Nigel's friend Phil Mitchell (Steve McFadden) and Linda Carter (Kellie Bright) support Nigel through his issues. Patrick becomes romantically withdrawn from Yolande, upsetting her. She fears that Patrick cannot look at her the same due to Pastor Clayton's abuse, but Patrick reassures her that he loves her, and they get engaged. When it is close to the wedding, Patrick is attacked by Oscar Branning (Pierre Moullier), which shatters his confidence. He decides to postpone the wedding, which upsets Yolande, but they end up getting married on the day. Yolande provides emotional support to Patrick after his son Anthony Trueman (Nicholas Bailey) is murdered on Christmas Day 2025 and later convinces him to get to know his granddaughter, Anthony's long-lost daughter Jasmine Fisher (Indeyarna Donaldson-Holness), who unbeknownst to them had killed Anthony in defence of her mother Zoe Slater (Michelle Ryan). Patrick and Yolande are devastated to find this out when Zoe's mother Kat (Jessie Wallace) turns Jasmine into the police. To help cheer up Patrick, Denzel introduces him to an AI simulation of Anthony, to which Patrick becomes addicted, though he eventually overcomes this. Yolande later supports her friend Julie Bates (Karen Henthorn), Nigel's wife, when Nigel dies from pneumonia, a complication from his dementia. She also supports Denise through her diagnosis of acute myeloid leukaemia, an aggressive type of blood cancer, when Denise confides in her alone.

== Reception ==
For her role as Yolande, Angela Wynter won "Best Actor" at the 2024 Radio Times Soap Awards. She was longlisted for "Best Actress" at the 2024 Inside Soap Awards.

The Voice claimed that Yolande "was an instant hit with viewers, especially within the African-Caribbean community" and hailed Yolande and Patrick as "most loved Black TV couple." Morris from What to Watch dubbed Yolande a "legendary" and "iconic" character. Stephen Patterson, writing for the Metro, expressed hope that the character would return and called her "a firm-favourite with viewers". The Radio Times' Laura Denby believed that a return for the "strong-willed" character would be a positive move for the soap and opined that she is "one of the good ones". She called her a "feisty, vibrant character we know and love." Her colleague, Stefania Sarrubba, deemed her return "hotly-anticipated". Lewis Knight, also from the publication, included Yolande's reintroduction as an example of the show's "renaissance". In 2024, he said that Yolande's return "[reminded] us just how much we had missed her warmth and wisdom".
