= List of EastEnders characters introduced in 2025 =

EastEnders logo

EastEnders is a BBC soap opera that first aired on 19 February 1985. This is a list of characters that debuted in 2025. All characters before February were introduced by the show's former executive producer, Chris Clenshaw, with the remainder introduced by Ben Wadey, who took over Clenshaw's position. Councillor Barker (Iain Fletcher) made his debut in January 2025. Julia, the daughter of Sonia Fowler (Natalie Cassidy) and Reiss Colwell (Jonny Freeman), is born in February. Ross Marshall (Alex Walkinshaw) and his son Joel (Max Murray) first appear in March alongside returning character Vicki Fowler (Alice Haig). Terry Cant (Glen Davies), Sonia's father, arrives in April. In May, Jimmy Beale is born to Lauren Branning (Jacqueline Jossa) and Peter Beale (Thomas Law). Drug dealer Tobias "Okie" Okyere (Aayan Ibikunle Shoderu) arrives in July, as well as thug Fat Mike (Tai Hilferink).

Twins Josh Goodwin (Joshua Vaughan) and Jasmine Fisher (Indeyarna Donaldson-Holness) debuted in September as the estranged children of Zoe Slater (Michelle Ryan) and Anthony Trueman (Nicholas Bailey). Demi (Lucy Edington-Brown) also appears in September as a mother attending the same baby sensory class as Peter. In October, Tim Walton (Tom Ratcliffe) arrives as an ex-client of Johnny Carter's (Charlie Suff), as well as Mini Mo, a cat owned by Zoe. Norma Unwin (Jessica Turner) appears in November as the mother of Eve Panesar-Unwin (Heather Peace). Additionally, several other characters appear throughout the year.

== Councillor Barker ==
Councillor Barker
- EastEnders character
- Portrayed by: Iain Fletcher
- Duration: 2025–2026
- First appearance: Episode 7053; 21 January 2025
- Last appearance: Episode 7267; 26 January 2026
- Introduced by: Chris Clenshaw (2025); Ben Wadey (2026)
In-universe information
- Occupation: Councillor

Councillor Donald Barker, played by Iain Fletcher, made his first appearance on 21 January 2025 in a guest capacity. Fletcher had previously appeared in another British long-running serial, The Bill. Councillor Barker is introduced as part of a storyline regarding Walford residents fighting to keep Bridge Street Market open, as he is trying to scale back the market. EastEnders spoilers revealed that Martin Fowler (James Bye) arranges a meeting with Councillor Barker and is stressed when it is brought forward, so he gets support from his girlfriend Ruby Allen (Louisa Lytton). Steven Murphy from Inside Soap teased that Ruby's initial meeting with the Councillor would not go as well as she hoped due to the pair getting into a big argument. Following this, Ruby tries to make things right and attempts to carry out an "ambitious plan" with Mr Barker after running into him at the Minute Mart. Lewis Knight from Radio Times believed that it was obvious that Ruby is trying to impress Martin with the plan as she is insecure about his relationship with his former wife Stacey Slater (Lacey Turner). Knight also described Councillor Barker as "antagonistic".

== Julia Fowler ==
Julia Fowler
- EastEnders character
- Portrayed by: Uncredited
- First appearance: Episode 7072; 20 February 2025
- Last appearance: Episode 7104; 17 April 2025
- Introduced by: Chris Clenshaw
In-universe information
- Family: Branning
- Father: Reiss Colwell
- Mother: Sonia Fowler
- Half-sisters: Bex Fowler
- Grandfathers: Terry Cant
- Grandmothers: Carol Jackson
- Uncles: Robbie Jackson; Billie Jackson
- Aunts: Bianca Jackson
- First cousins: Liam Butcher; Tiffany Butcher; Morgan Butcher; Sami Jackson
- Other relatives: Jim Branning; Dot Cotton; Lauren Branning; Jack Branning

Julia Fowler is the daughter of Sonia Fowler (Natalie Cassidy) and Reiss Colwell (Jonny Freeman). She was born during the show's 40th anniversary live episode broadcast on 20 February 2025. Shortly before her birth, Sonia announced that she would name her daughter either Julia or Toni, as a tribute to the creators of EastEnders, Julia Smith and Tony Holland. Similar to a concurrent interactive storyline where the show's audience were able to vote for either Jack Branning (Scott Maslen) or Ravi Gulati (Aaron Thiara) as Denise Fox's (Diane Parish) lover, following the episode broadcast on 19 February 2025 where Sonia goes into labour, the audience were also given the opportunity to vote for either Julia or Toni as the name for Sonia's baby. The baby's name was revealed during the live episode.

When Julia is born, the baby initially is not breathing, but she is eventually resuscitated. In March 2025, Sonia announces that she intends to register Julia's surname as Fowler, as a tribute to her friend and ex-husband Martin Fowler (James Bye), who died following an explosion at The Queen Victoria public house. Shortly after, Julia then leaves Walford with Sonia, her half-sister, Bex Fowler (Jasmine Armfield) and aunt Bianca Jackson (Patsy Palmer) to start a new life.

== Gaz ==
Gaz
- EastEnders character
- Portrayed by: Keith Allen
- Appears in: Episode 7088; 20 March 2025
- Introduced by: Chris Clenshaw

Gaz, portrayed by Keith Allen, made a guest appearance in an episode broadcast on 20 March 2025 focusing on Phil Mitchell's (Steve McFadden) mental health recovery. Phil befriended Gaz, who is a fellow patient in the mental health unit, and helped Phil open up and begin his road to recovery. Allen's casting was announced on 5 March 2025, and appeared in a special episode being set across four weeks, seeing Phil begin treatment to address his inner trauma and understand his depression and symptoms of psychosis. Gaz bonded with Phil and helped him to engage in therapy and group activities, after initially being reluctant. EastEnders has worked with several charities, including The Samaritans, Rethink Mental Illness, the Campaign Against Living Miserably (CALM), and Mind, to ensure Phil's story is portrayed "accurately and sensitively."

Upon casting, Allen joked: "I've written a number one hit single, I've presented Top of the Pops, I've played the lead in the West End and I was at Craven Cottage when we beat Juventus 4–1...Could it get better than that?" He continued: "Well, yes, I've just guested in an episode of EastEnders... What a joy! And what an honour to be a part of Steve McFadden's incredibly moving storyline. I may be a resting actor but I now rest in peace." Executive producer Chris Clenshaw expressed his delight about Allen's casting: "I'm delighted to welcome the incredibly talented Keith Allen to the cast of EastEnders as he takes on the guest role of Gaz in a special episode focusing on Phil's mental health." He continued: "Keith and Steve's performances are both phenomenal, and thoughtfully and sensitively portray the complex realities of mental health recovery and the impact of hypermasculinity."

== Andy ==
Andy
- EastEnders character
- Portrayed by: Jake Rory
- First appearance: Episode 7088; 20 March 2025
- Last appearance: Comic Relief Special; 21 March 2025
- Introduced by: Chris Clenshaw

Andy, portrayed by Jake Rory, made his first appearance on 20 March 2025, and later appeared in a special five minute episode on 21 March, which will see EastEnders team up with Comic Relief. Rory's casting was announced on 16 March 2025 and his character will feature in an episode that focuses on Phil Mitchell's (Steve McFadden) mental health struggle. In this episode, Phil meets Andy who tells him about his time in a homeless youth hostel, and they both realise they have plenty more in common than expected. Executive producer Chris Clenshaw spoke about the storyline: "We're thrilled to be working alongside Comic Relief and Brandon Centre as we continue to explore the complex realities of Phil's journey with mental health. Whilst seeking treatment, Phil and Andy quickly realise they have more in common than they first anticipated." The episode will air during Comic Relief: Funny For Money.

EastEnders and Comic Relief have worked with Brandon Centre, a Comic Relief funded charity which focuses on youth mental help support to ensure that the storyline has been handled as accurately as possible. Samir Patel, the CEO of Comic Relief, said: "Comic Relief has a long and proud history of supporting organisations who are delivering work to help tackle homelessness and the ongoing mental health crisis. We are extremely grateful to EastEnders and Brandon Centre for their work in helping to create this powerful and poignant film that will resonate with so many. Together with your support this Red Nose Day, we can help ensure support just like this is available to those who need it the most right here in the UK and around the world." Julia Brown, the CEO of Brandon Centre added: "The support from Comic Relief has been invaluable. It has allowed us to make an enormous difference to local homeless young people, with therapy delivered directly in hostels, at a time when they need it the most. Working alongside the EastEnders team has been hugely important, as it is significantly helping raise awareness of the drastic impact of homelessness on young people's lives."

== Charlotte Seytor ==
Charlotte Seytor, portrayed by Leonie Elliott, made her debut in Episode 7093, which originally aired on 31 March 2025. Her character is posing as an undercover journalist, who befriends Bianca Jackson (Patsy Palmer) whilst looking for their next story. Elliott has previously worked on another long-running BBC serial: Call the Midwife. After her first appearance, Elliott confirmed that she would appear in more episodes when she posted a photo of herself with Palmer on Instagram with the caption: "DOOF, doof, doof... Back on your screens this week and next week on #Eastenders! Loved working with the brilliant @patsypalmerofficial. Happy 40th Eastenders!"

== Ross Marshall ==
Ross Marshall
- EastEnders character
- Portrayed by: Alex Walkinshaw
- Duration: 2025–present
- First appearance: Episode 7093; 31 March 2025
- Introduced by: Chris Clenshaw
In-universe information
- Wife: Cleo Marshall (backstory); Vicki Fowler (2026–present)
- Sons: Joel Marshall

Ross Marshall, portrayed by Alex Walkinshaw, is the boyfriend of established character Vicki Fowler (Alice Haig), who arrives in Walford for the funeral of her uncle, Martin Fowler (James Bye), alongside Ross and his son, Joel (Max Murray), on 31 March 2025. Walkinshaw's casting was announced on the same day as Haig's and Murray's on 22 February 2025. Vicki's arrival alongside Ross and Joel's is due to "cause a stir" for the residents of Walford who believed that Vicki was still in a relationship with her long-term boyfriend, Spencer Moon (Christopher Parker). The new arrivals are due to come as a shock to Vicki's half-sister Sharon Watts (Letitia Dean) and Spencer's brother, Alfie Moon (Shane Richie). Speaking of his role, Walkinshaw said: "I am really excited, as I've had so many friends on EastEnders throughout the years, and I always hear lovely things about it. The show is top-drawer drama and I can't wait to get stuck in. Ross is a decent, hardworking family man; he always puts family first, and he is very in love with Vicki, but it's not always plain sailing."

Executive producer Chris Clenshaw spoke about Haig's, Walkinshaw's and Murray's castings: "We're delighted to have the very talented Alice, Alex and Max with us. Vicki is back under the most tragic of circumstances, representing her distraught mum Michelle, and she's changed a lot since we last saw her. We're excited to let viewers get reacquainted with Vicki and to introduce Ross and Joel to the Square. It won't be long before Vicki and this new branch of the Fowler family are making waves in Walford."

== Joel Marshall ==
Joel Marshall
- EastEnders character
- Portrayed by: Max Murray
- Duration: 2025–present
- First appearance: Episode 7093; 31 March 2025
- Introduced by: Chris Clenshaw (2025); Ben Wadey (2026)
In-universe information
- Occupation: Student
- Father: Ross Marshall
- Mother: Cleo Marshall
- Stepfather: Matt
- Stepmother: Vicki Fowler

Joel Marshall, portrayed by Max Murray, is the son of Ross Marshall (Alex Walkinshaw), Vicki Fowler's (Alice Haig) boyfriend. He arrives in Walford for the funeral of Vicki's uncle Martin Fowler (James Bye) alongside Vicki and his father on 31 March 2025. Murray's casting was announced the same day as Haig's and Walkinshaw's on 22 February 2025. Vicki's arrival alongside Ross and Joel's is due to "cause a stir" for the residents of Walford who believed that Vicki was still in a relationship with her long-term boyfriend, Spencer Moon (Christopher Parker). The new arrivals are due to come as a shock to Sharon Watts (Letitia Dean) and Spencer's brother, Alfie Moon (Shane Richie). Speaking of his role, Murray said: "It's an absolute privilege and honour to be joining such a wonderful production full of a lovely cast and crew. I'm really looking forward to introducing Joel to EastEnders viewers and telling his story."

Executive producer Chris Clenshaw spoke about Haig's, Walkinshaw's and Murray's castings: "We're delighted to have the very talented Alice, Alex and Max with us. Vicki is back under the most tragic of circumstances, representing her distraught mum, Michelle, and she's changed a lot since we last saw her. We're excited to let viewers get reacquainted with Vicki and to introduce Ross and Joel to the Square. It won't be long before Vicki and this new branch of the Fowler family are making waves in Walford." On 16 October 2025, it was announced that Joel would leave EastEnders after his storyline concluded. A source told Radio Times that Murray would depart after a storyline which would "leave viewers on the edge of their seats". In April 2026, it was announced that Murray had resumed filming and Joel would return later in the summer. Joel returned on 16 July 2026, alongside his estranged mother, Cleo, portrayed by Murray's real-life maternal aunt Mazz Murray.

== Terry Cant ==
Terry Cant
- EastEnders character
- Portrayed by: Glen Davies
- First appearance: Episode 7101; 14 April 2025
- Last appearance: Episode 7104; 17 April 2025
- Introduced by: Chris Clenshaw
In-universe information
- Mother: Eileen Cant
- Daughters: Sonia Fowler
- Granddaughters: Bex Fowler; Julia Fowler

Terry Cant, portrayed by Glen Davies, is the estranged father of Sonia Fowler (Natalie Cassidy), who made his first appearance in the episode broadcast on 14 April 2025. Davies had made two prior guest appearances in the serial: in 1995 for three episodes as Mervyn Dale, a reporter from the Walford Gazette who covered Arthur Fowler's (Bill Treacher) imprisonment for embezzlement, and an unnamed plumber in 2013. Terry is Carol Jackson's (Lindsey Coulson) ex-partner and Sonia's father. He is first mentioned in 1995 by Carol in the wake of the revelation of David Wicks (Michael French) being Bianca Jackson's (Patsy Palmer) father. Carol mentions that Terry was abusive to her and stole her personal belongings after she threw him out following Sonia's birth. In 2020, Sonia goes looking for Terry online and is ultimately unsuccessful until Tom "Rocky" Cotton (Brian Conley) makes an appearance, assuming Terry's identity. However, several months later, Rocky's true identity is exposed.

Several years later, when Bianca is being harassed following her podcast about her kidnap ordeal at the hands of Sonia's ex-partner, Reiss Colwell (Jonny Freeman), Terry appears in the square among the group of people who attend Kim Fox (Tameka Empson) and Mo Harris's (Laila Morse) true crime tour. Bianca spots him and recognizes him instantly. Terry mentions that he has come to reach out to Sonia after hearing the podcast. Bianca, however, angrily orders him to stay away, as she knows Carol and Terry's history. Undeterred, Terry arrives at Number 25 and Sonia answers the door, and he introduces himself as her father, which shocks her. Terry reveals he has been living in Bali for a few years and invites Sonia and her daughters Bex (Jasmine Armfield) and Julia to join him. Sonia quickly agrees, much to Bianca's horror. Bianca gives Sonia her blessing but later attempts to phone Carol in the local playground, which is witnessed by Terry, who turns violent and grabs Bianca and threatens her not to come between him and Sonia. At her farewell party, Sonia announces that she and the girls will not be joining Terry in Bali, to his fury. Terry's true colours are shown when he makes disparaging remarks about Carol and the Branning family and leaves. However, he returns and menaces Bianca and Sonia, saying the latter should never been born. Bex overhears and shoves her grandfather into a shed and bolts the door, further enraging him. Sonia and Bex decide to take the tickets and Bianca agrees to join them. They take Terry's car and boat and Bianca asks George Knight (Colin Salmon) to let Terry out after he calms down. Bianca, Sonia, Bex and Julia then leave Walford.

== Jimmy Beale ==
Jimmy Beale
- EastEnders character
- Portrayed by: Uncredited
- Duration: 2025–present
- First appearance: Episode 7015; 7 May 2025
- Introduced by: Chris Clenshaw
In-universe information
- Family: Beale/Branning
- Father: Peter Beale
- Mother: Lauren Branning
- Brothers: Louie Beale
- Grandfathers: Max Branning; Ian Beale
- Grandmothers: Tanya Branning; Cindy Beale
- Uncles: Steven Beale; Bobby Beale; Bradley Branning; Oscar Branning
- Aunts: Lucy Beale; Abi Branning; Cindy Williams; Gina Knight; Anna Knight; Annie Carter
- First cousins: Abi Branning; Beth Williams
- Other relatives: Kathy Beale; Jack Branning; Ben Mitchell; Lexi Pearce; Sonia Fowler; Bianca Jackson; Robbie Jackson; Penny Branning; Amy Mitchell; Ricky Branning

Jimmy Beale is the son of established characters Peter Beale (Thomas Law) and Lauren Branning (Jacqueline Jossa). He was born during episode 7015, broadcast on 7 May 2025. When Jimmy is born, the baby initially is not breathing, but he is eventually resuscitated. Jimmy is named after his maternal great-grandfather Jim Branning (John Bardon), who appeared in the soap between 1996 and 2011, and died off-screen in 2015. Joel Harley from Metro described the name choice to be "a good, strong name with ties to EastEnders history." Harley also suggested: "the name Jimmy holds more meaning behind the scenes of the soap too – being a likely tribute to recently departed star James Bye, who played Martin Fowler for over ten years." He continued: "Martin is greatly missed, but his legacy lives on – albeit subtly – in little baby Jimmy Beale."

On 12 May 2025, it was announced that Jimmy would be diagnosed with a severe visual impairment, chorioretinal and optic nerve coloboma. EastEnders would be working with the Royal National Institute of Blind People (RNIB) for guidance. Executive producer, Chris Clenshaw told Digital Spy: "It was imperative that we worked with RNIB and experts in the field when consulting on Jimmy's visual impairment storyline to ensure it was portrayed sensitively and accurately. The story will continue to develop over time as we look to focus on how the diagnosis affects Lauren and Peter as parents, their family and later, the effects this will have on Jimmy." RNIB's Head of Eye Health, Optometry and Low Vision, Louise Gow added: "Working with EastEnders on this important storyline involving Lauren, Peter and baby Jimmy has been such a great experience. The team at EastEnders has worked closely with RNIB by listening to our advice and developing a story that authentically captures the experiences of parents of children with visual impairment. While every family's experience is different, the story demonstrates the emotional impact and challenges of vision impairment. It highlights and raises awareness of the support that is available for people with sight loss – parents, carers, children, and young people."

Regarding the storyline, a Walford insider told Digital Spy: "Lauren sees no choice but to race to the hospital. She insists that he is seen as a matter of urgency." They continued: "Luckily, Linda [Carter], played by Kellie Bright, arrives with a gift at the perfect time, and the two mums share an honest conversation about their mental health struggles," reveals our insider. "In fact, mum-of-five Linda offers even more words of wisdom when she advises Lauren to listen to her maternal instincts when it comes to Jimmy."

== Tobias "Okie" Okyere ==
Tobias "Okie" Okyere
- EastEnders character
- Portrayed by: Aayan Ibikunle Shoderu
- First appearance: Episode 7149; 9 July 2025
- Last appearance: Episode 7222; 11 November 2025
- Introduced by: Ben Wadey
In-universe information
- Occupation: Drug dealer
- Sisters: Dejia Okyere

Tobias "Okie" Okyere, portrayed by former Casualty actor Aayan Ibikunle Shoderu, first appeared in Episode 7149, which originally aired on 9 July 2025. He first arrives as a drug dealer enlisted by Ravi Gulati (Aaron Thiara) to do a job to help gain quick money after being financially ruined. He arrived at Ravi's daughter Avani Nandra-Hart's (Aaliyah James) 16th birthday party to discuss the missing drugs after Kojo Asare (Dayo Koleosho) flushed them down a toilet, which Harry Mitchell (Elijah Holloway) covered for by staging a break-in at the garage. Ravi then attacks Okie after he says the Panesar family have been a joke since their patriarch, Nish Panesar (Navin Chowdhry), was killed. Shoderu confirmed that Okie would appear more over the coming months after what seemed a guest appearance. He posted on Instagram: "Okie's on the Square. Lock into @bbceastenders for the next couple months." His debut received positive comments from fans.

Okie and Ravi formed what Johnathan Halm from Metro described to be a "dangerous alliance". It was also revealed that Kojo, an autistic man, was made vulnerable to the cuckooing process, which is the practice of using a person's dwelling, usually one who is vulnerable, for illegal activities. Executive producer Ben Wadey spoke about the storyline: "At EastEnders, we're proud to tell stories that reflect the real challenges people face, and Kojo's cuckooing storyline is one that feels especially important." He continued: "Cuckooing is a form of exploitation that too often goes unseen and hasn't featured on EastEnders before. Through Kojo's experience we hope to have shined a light on how easily vulnerable people can be manipulated and isolated – something that can happen in any community, but feels particularly resonant in a city like London, where people live side by side and yet can still slip through the cracks. Working closely with experts and charities, our aim has been to tell this story with care and authenticity, and to raise awareness as to how to identify the signs of exploitation and the importance of reaching out for help."

To portray the cuckooing storyline, EastEnders has worked with Causeway, a modern slavery charity, and the National Autistic Society as well experts in the field of the cuckooing element of the storyline. Helen Ball, CEO of Causeway, spoke about the storyline: "Causeway are proud to have supported EastEnders on this important and timely storyline. Cuckooing is a cruel and dehumanising form of exploitation where the home of someone vulnerable is taken over by criminals. We were grateful to EastEnders for the opportunity to work with their team on the research behind this storyline and we hope that by shining a light on cuckooing, EastEnders can help raise awareness of the issue and help people spot the signs of grooming and exploitation around them." Dr Judith Brown, Head of Evidence and Research at the National Autistic Society, also commented on working with the show's bosses to carefully and truthfully portray the story: "It's a privilege to work with the EastEnders team on such a painful yet significant storyline about Kojo's "cuckooing" or home takeover. We thank the entire EastEnders team for focusing on a genuine issue that impacts the lives of autistic people. The awful truth is that autistic people are more at risk of abuse, victimisation and exploitation than non-autistic people. Because autistic people can find it hard to interpret social cues, emotions and inferred meaning, some may not always recognise manipulative or dangerous behaviours from others. We hope this storyline encourages any autistic person or parent of autistic children to learn what abuse and exploitation can look like."

== Fat Mike ==
Michael Smith
- EastEnders character
- Portrayed by: Tai Hilferink
- First appearance: Episode 7153; 14 July 2025
- Last appearance: Episode 7166; 5 August 2025
- Introduced by: Ben Wadey

Michael "Fat Mike" Smith, portrayed by Tai Hilferink, is part of a gang who have been hassling Oscar Branning (Pierre Counihan-Moullier). He made his first appearance in Episode 7153, which originally aired on 14 July 2025 when Oscar spotted them outside the young offenders institute, where he explained to his sister Lauren Branning (Jacqueline Jossa), her fiancé Peter Beale (Thomas Law), and his father Ian Beale (Adam Woodyatt) that they have it out for him. Oscar also revealed that they petrol bombed his mother Tanya Cross's (Jo Joyner) house thinking he was there.

A source told Digital Spy: "When Oscar arrived in Walford last week, it soon became clear that he was running from a dangerous fella called Mike. The pair went joyriding together and Oscar was caught, but he gave the police Mike's name to try and reduce his sentence. Now Mike wants revenge, and Oscar is in serious trouble! He's tried to make a fresh start in Albert Square, but Mike's sinister text messages have left him terrified." They continued by explaining how their actions have affected Oscar: "Oscar goes on the attack and lashes out, thinking that Mike is still out to get him, but he doesn't realise that the mystery intruder is just Peter!" reveals our source. "Peter is furious about this incident and orders him to leave – he's finally had enough of Oscar's antics."

== Josh Goodwin ==
Josh Goodwin
- EastEnders character
- Portrayed by: Uncredited (2025; flashbacks); Joshua Vaughan (2026–present)
- Duration: 2025–present
- First appearance: Episode 7183; 3 September 2025
- Introduced by: Ben Wadey
In-universe information
- Occupation: Salon assistant
- Family: Slater
- Father: Anthony Trueman
- Mother: Zoe Slater
- Adoptive father: Keith Goodwin
- Adoptive mother: Sandra Goodwin
- Sisters: Jasmine Fisher
- Half-brothers: Euan Trueman
- Grandfathers: Harry Slater; Patrick Trueman
- Grandmothers: Kat Slater; Audrey Trueman
- Uncles: Tommy Moon; Bert Moon; Ernie Moon; Paul Trueman; Isaac Baptiste
- Other relatives: Mo Harris; Lily Slater

Josh Goodwin, played by Joshua Vaughan, is the twin brother of established character Jasmine Fisher (Indeyarna Donaldson-Holness) and son of Zoe Slater (Michelle Ryan) and Anthony Trueman (Nicholas Bailey). His character first appeared in September 2025 in flashback scenes from when he was first born. Vaughan's casting as an adult version of Josh was leaked to the media on 5 February 2026. Vaughan made his first credited appearance as Josh on 19 February 2026 in a voice call to Jasmine, which was picked up by Cindy Beale (Michelle Collins). He first appeared in person on 17 March 2026.

Vaughan's casting was confirmed by the BBC on 4 March 2026, alongside that of the character's adoptive mother, Sandra Goodwin (Dawn Steele). Sandra arrives in Walford seeking answers on Jasmine's murder of Anthony, Josh and Jasmine's biological father. Josh follows her, unbeknownst that his birth family live in the area. On his casting, Vaughan said: "It has been incredibly humbling to join the cast of EastEnders and find myself at the intersection of the iconic Trueman and Slater families. Getting to work alongside such legacy actors is a masterclass, and I’ve learned so much from them." He described his character as a "big ball of love" and was excited for viewers to "see the drama unfold as he arrives onto the Square."

Josh is set to be part of a love triangle involving his twin sister and her on-off boyfriend, Oscar Branning (Pierre Counihan-Moullier). Stefania Sarrubba from Digital Spy wrote: "The three characters will enjoy off-the-charts chemistry, with their connection moving onto the physical plane." A source told Metro: "This is going to be one of the hottest love triangles the soap world has ever seen. Oscar is happy with Jasmine but when her twin arrives the chemistry between them is something neither can ignore." They continued: "It's going to set temperatures soaring in Walford. But with Jasmine having bumped off her dad Anthony Trueman at Christmas the pair had better watch out."

== Jasmine Fisher ==
Jasmine Fisher, portrayed by Indeyarna Donaldson-Holness, is the long-lost daughter of Zoe Slater (Michelle Ryan) and Anthony Trueman (Nicholas Bailey). She made her first appearance on 3 September 2025 in flashback scenes to 2006 when Zoe gave birth to twins and then made her first present day appearance on 22 September 2025. Donaldson-Holness' casting was announced on 15 September 2025 and her character was described as "mysterious" and a "resourceful young woman" by Laura Denby from Radio Times. Denby also teased a potential romance for Jasmine with Oscar Branning (Pierre Counihan-Moullier).

On 15 December 2025, it was revealed that Jasmine is the biological daughter of Anthony and Zoe. When Jasmine was born, her heart stopped so Zoe presumed she was dead, fleeing the hospital before she can learn of her fate. Anthony and Zoe are revealed to be Jasmine's parents after Anthony persuades a medical professional to get documents about Zoe's birth. The applicant produces a number of documents and after seeing the babies' birth date, he calculates that he is the father. These papers also reveal that their daughter was resuscitated and subsequently put up for adoption. Jasmine reveals that she was adopted and had moved to East London to track down her birth mother.

== Demi ==
Demi
- EastEnders character
- Portrayed by: Lucy Edington-Brown
- First appearance: Episode 7193; 22 September 2025
- Last appearance: Episode 7196; 25 September 2025
- Introduced by: Ben Wadey
In-universe information
- Occupation: Burlesque dancer
- Daughters: Layla

Demi, portrayed by Lucy Edington-Brown, is a mother attending Jimmy Beale's baby sensory classes. Her casting was announced on 16 September 2025. She meets Peter Beale (Thomas Law) at the classes and Peter goes for a drink with her against his father Ian Beale's (Adam Woodyatt) advice. Laura Denby from Radio Times revealed "it's clear Demi fancies Peter." Despite returning home to his fianceé Lauren Branning (Jacqueline Jossa) "full of energy", his drink with Demi was witnessed by Lauren's cousin Penny Branning (Kitty Castledine). Denby explained: "Penny demands that Peter tell Lauren about Demi, but he fails to do so, only for Lauren to see a flirty message on his phone." Lauren isn't bothered by Demi's text, which causes Peter to question his relationship with her. Penny later organises for her, Lauren and Demi to have coffee together forming a bond, leaving Peter horrified when he hears the trio laughing at his expense.

A source told Digital Spy: "Ian advises Peter to stay well clear of Demi. It's surprisingly sage advice considering Ian's track record with women, but Peter throws caution to the wind and heads to The Vic. Demi is delighted with his company and even slips her hand on top of his. It's surely not a great look for a fella with a fiancé [sic] and two kids at home..." The source also described the effect Demi would have on Peter and Lauren's relationship: "It's really not like Lauren. Knowing both Lauren and Peter, this definitely wouldn't have go [sic] down well a few years ago. But times change and Lauren has grown up lots since her early days with Peter."

== Tim Walton ==
Tim Walton
- EastEnders character
- Portrayed by: Tom Ratcliffe
- Duration: 2025–2026
- First appearance: Episode 7210; 21 October 2025
- Last appearance: Episode 7288; 3 March 2026
- Introduced by: Ben Wadey
In-universe information
- Occupation: Investor

Timothy "Tim" Walton, portrayed by Tom Ratcliffe, is an ex-client of Johnny Carter (Charlie Suff) who he meets up with to go into business with. His arrival was announced on 15 October 2025 and he made his first appearance on 21 October 2025. Johnny's boyfriend, Callum Highway (Tony Clay) had conerns regarding Tim. Louisa Riley from Digital Spy explained: "After some positive encouragement from Callum, recently unemployed Johnny decides to explore an exciting new business opportunity with associate Tim. And when the guy arrives at the Vic for his meeting with Johnny, Elaine is immediately impressed! However, it's not all plain sailing, as when Callum arrives, he's shocked to find that Tim isn't exactly what he expected – and he warns Johnny about Tim's possible ulterior motives..."

On 3 December 2025, it was announced that Tim would be returning to Walford. He returned when invited to dinner with Johnny and his grandmother, Elaine Peacock (Harriet Thorpe). After winning her over, Tim and Elaine successfully went into business together. An insider told Digital Spy: "Elaine knows that Tim has influence within the council, so she decides to use that to her advantage. She won't give up on Peacock Palace easily, so fingers crossed that being wined and dined is enough to bribe Tim into having a word on Elaine's behalf!"

== Mini Mo ==
Mini Mo
- EastEnders character
- Portrayed by: Uncredited
- Duration: 2025–present
- First appearance: Episode 7212; 23 October 2025
- Introduced by: Ben Wadey
In-universe information
- Owner: Zoe Slater

Mini Mo is a cat that was taken in by Zoe Slater (Michelle Ryan) after being found inside a pipe in The Queen Victoria public house. In October 2025, Bert and Ernie Moon (Elliot and Cody Briffett) hear a sound from the barrel store and think it is a ghost. Zoe goes to investigate alongside Kat (Jessie Wallace) and Alfie Moon (Shane Richie). As Alfie opens the pipe, Mini Mo is found and Zoe decides to take her in. Zoe later believes Mini Mo has gone missing and enlists Anthony Trueman (Nicholas Bailey) to help look for her, however when she returns The Queen Vic, Kat tells her Mini Mo's been curled up behind the sofa all day. In November 2025, Mini Mo goes missing again and Zoe suspects her disappearance is an act of her stalker. Mini Mo is later found under Zoe's bed in a cat carrier.

Mini Mo was nominated for Favourite Animal Star at the 2026 TVTimes Awards.

== Robin Dawson ==
Robin Dawson
- EastEnders character
- Portrayed by: Alistair Cope
- Duration: 2025–present
- First appearance: Episode 7215; 29 October 2025
- Introduced by: Ben Wadey
In-universe information
- Occupation: Adoption agency representative

Robin Dawson, portrayed by Alistair Cope, is an adoption agency representative who first appears in Episode 7215, which originally aired on 29 October 2025. He first appears when he visits Suki (Balvinder Sopal) and Eve Panesar-Unwin (Heather Peace) to discuss the possibilities of them adopting. Cope continued to appear a few times over the following months. On 14 April 2026, Cope announced he would be returning to EastEnders after posting on his Instagram stories he was back filming for a "crazy few weeks." Harriet Mitchell from Digital Spy reported: "With Cope's recent hints, it looks as though the soap will be delving deeper into that story soon."

Sopal previously spoke about the storyline: "That's going to be a nice long arc. We're going to delve quite deep, hopefully, into both of their backgrounds and lives, and just see the effects of what it means and what it takes to actually go ahead and adopt." She also revealed that EastEnders had researched into the adoption process to ensure that it was portrayed sensitively and accurately. She explained: "We want to be as truthful as we possibly can. It's not easy. We know that. The team at EastEnders have done their background research, so you're in for a treat. I think we will be seeing a lot of their pasts come to the forefront."

== Norma Unwin ==
Norma Unwin
- EastEnders character
- Portrayed by: Jessica Turner
- First appearance: Episode 7217; 3 November 2025
- Last appearance: Episode 7219; 5 November 2025
- Introduced by: Ben Wadey
In-universe information
- Daughters: Eve Unwin; Erica Unwin

Norma Unwin, portrayed by Jessica Turner, is the mother of Eve Panesar-Unwin (Heather Peace). Turner's casting was announced on 28 October 2025 and she made her first appearance on 3 November 2025. She tears Eve down, causing her to try and persuade her wife Suki Panesar-Unwin (Balvinder Sopal) to cancel adoption plans. Eve and Suki try to impress Norma, but fail to do so. Peace spoke about Norma: "Norma is a bit of a slippery fish. It's very obvious she doesn't really approve of Suki and Eve's relationship. Norma has her nose in the air a lot of the time, and she toys with them a little bit too. As the week goes on, there are some twists and turns, but when they start talking about proper stuff, it all blows up again..."

Nish arranges to get at Eve and Suki for their affair and puts Norma in hospital in October 2024. Eve gets the call from her estranged dad and she goes to see her mum in hospital with Suki.

Norma arrives in Walford in November 2025 when Eve ans Suki plan to apply for adoption, Eve is very nervous in her presence, but Suki and Eve maintain a strong front as they need a reference from her. Peace continued: "Eve believes that the entire adoption process relies on this reference. She can get other references, but they specifically requested one from before Eve had a criminal record. It might be that she can search around and find someone else, but the adoption assessor said it would be best coming from a parent or sibling." After initial doubts, Norma does write a reference for her daughter. Peace mused: "Norma is uptight, and I think she's a bit of a narcissist. When she first arrives, it's all pleasantries and politeness, but that's just surface stuff. As soon as anyone touches on anything deeper, it all starts to unravel."

== Other characters ==
Character	Portrayer(s)	Episode date(s)	Details	Ref
Nurse Stella Dempsey	Prabhleen Oberoi	13 January 2025	A nurse working at Walford General Hospital. She tells the investigators that Cindy Beale (Michelle Collins) needs rest when they are asking her questions about her attack and advises her to try to sleep.	
Asad Bashar	Aslam Amjad	17 March 2025	The brother of Harry Mitchell's (Elijah Holloway) ex-girlfiend, Shireen, who was murdered by Harry's mother, Nicola Mitchell (Laura Doddington). It is believed that Harry was responsible and on the fourth anniversary of her disappearance, Asad shows up wanting answers and then accuses Harry's father, Teddy Mitchell (Roland Manookian).	
Benjamin "Benji" Haynes	Carl Prekopp	17 March 2025	A man whose car Nicola Mitchell (Laura Doddington) gets into and reveals that she was the one who murdered Shireen Bashar. Benji is revealed to have buried Shireen under Nicola's instruction.	
Isaac	Zak Devlin	28 July	Isaac is a guy who leaves Oscar Branning's (Pierre Counihan-Moullier) house after the pair had a one-night stand. Isaac wants to see Oscar again and get to know him but Oscar does not want something long-term and tells Isaac to leave.	
Greg Dolan	Dean Williamson	4–18 September	A man who was the neighbour of Zoe Slater's (Michelle Ryan) baby son's foster family. Zoe visits him to find out more information, but he wants to be paid. When Zoe tells him she doesn't have any money, he tries to sexually assault her, causing her to hit him over the head with a lamp twice. She later brings Stacey Slater (Lacey Turner) to see if he survived or not, which he did and later holds Zoe's mother, Kat Moon (Jessie Wallace) at knife point. Greg subsequently holds all three Slaters hostage in The Queen Vic, which causes Tommy Moon (Sonny Kendall) to call Jack Branning (Scott Maslen) and Ravi Gulati (Aaron Thiara) for help.	
Layla	Uncredited	22 September	The baby daughter of Demi (Lucy Edington-Brown), whom she is attending baby sensory classes with alongside Peter Beale (Thomas Law) and his son Jimmy Beale.	
Anita Fisher	Yasmine Holness-Dove	24 November	The adoptive mother of Jasmine Fisher (Indeyarna Donaldson-Holness) who Cindy Beale (Michelle Collins) contacts. She reveals that Jasmine has a dark side of her and that her ex's family were dangerous, causing Anita to walk out full of anxiety.	
Dejia Okyere	Keri Mosuro	3–10 December	The sister of Okie (Aayan Ibikunle Shoderu) who arrives for his memorial after he was killed by Harry Mitchell (Elijah Holloway). She later attends Harry's father, Teddy Mitchell's (Roland Manookian) murder trial as he took the blame for Okie's death.	
