= Joshua Vaughan =

English actor (born 2006)

- Born: 27 March 2006 (age 20); Birmingham, England
- Occupation: Actor
- Years active: 2016–present
- Television: EastEnders

Joshua Vaughan (born 27 March 2006) is an English actor. He began his career on stage, appearing in the West End musical School of Rock in 2016, as well as other productions including Macbeth and Motown: The Musical. In 2026, he joined the cast of the BBC soap opera EastEnders as Josh Goodwin.

== Early life ==
Vaughan was born in 2006 in Birmingham. He trained at the School of Theatre Excellence and the Birmingham Ormiston Academy.

== Career ==
In 2016, Vaughan was cast as Billy in the West End theatre production of Andrew Lloyd Webber's School of Rock. The cast of the musical also performed on the thirteenth series of The X Factor. He also appeared in the short film A Silent Night (2016). In 2018, he appeared in a production of Macbeth with the Royal Shakespeare Company, as well as Motown: The Musical s a young version of Michael Jackson. In 2022, he appeared in an episode of the BBC medical soap opera Doctors as Aidan Kemp. In 2025, he appeared in the short film Thicker Than the Waters of the Womb.

In February 2026, Vaughan joined the cast of the BBC soap opera EastEnders as Josh Goodwin, the long-lost son of Zoe Slater (Michelle Ryan) and brother of Jasmine Fisher (Indeyarna Donaldson-Holness). He made his first voice appearance via a phone call. It was announced prior to his arrival that the character would be involved in a bisexual love triangle between his sister and her boyfriend Oscar Branning (Pierre Counihan-Moullier).

== Filmography ==
Year	Title	Role	Notes
2016	A Silent Night	Young Kieran	Short film
2022	Doctors	Aidan Kemp	Episode: "Lessons Will Be Learned"
2025	Thicker Than the Waters of the Womb	AJ	Short film
2026–present	EastEnders	Josh Goodwin	Regular role

== Stage ==
Year	Title	Role	Venue
2016–2017	School of Rock	Billy	Gillian Lynne Theatre
2018	Macbeth	Young Macduff	UK tour
2018	Motown: The Musical	Young Michael Jackson	UK tour
