= Jasmine Fisher =

Fictional character from EastEnders

- EastEnders character
- Portrayed by: Indeyarna Donaldson-Holness; Uncredited (2025 flashback)
- Duration: 2025–present
- First appearance: Episode 7183; 3 September 2025
- Introduced by: Ben Wadey
In-universe information
- Occupation: Barmaid; Waitress
- Family: Slater
- Father: Anthony Trueman
- Mother: Zoe Slater
- Adoptive father: Colin Fisher
- Adoptive mother: Anita Fisher
- Brothers: Josh Goodwin
- Half-brothers: Euan Trueman
- Grandfathers: Harry Slater; Patrick Trueman
- Grandmothers: Kat Slater; Audrey Trueman
- Uncles: Tommy Moon; Bert Moon; Ernie Moon; Paul Trueman; Isaac Baptiste
- Other relatives: Mo Harris; Lily Slater; Charli Slater

Jasmine Fisher is a fictional character from the BBC soap opera EastEnders, portrayed by Indeyarna Donaldson-Holness. She first appeared in a flashback scene to 2006, broadcast on 3 September 2025, as a baby born to Zoe Slater (Michelle Ryan); however, at the time, the identity of Zoe's children was unknown. She first appeared in the present day in Episode 7193, broadcast on 22 September 2025.

Jasmine's arrival in the fictional town of Walford sees her be cagey about her past and she soon gets a job working for Cindy Beale (Michelle Collins), who she asks numerous questions about. The interactions were intended to mislead viewers into believing she had connections to Cindy as opposed to Zoe.

Jasmine has been described as a resourceful feisty character who tends to run from her problems. Her initial storylines see her attempting to build a life for herself in Walford, including beginning an on-off relationship with Oscar Branning (Pierre Counihan-Moullier). Her true parentage was then revealed in December 2025 as part of EastEnders' central Christmas storyline, which also revealed she worked with Chrissie Watts (Tracy-Ann Oberman) to torment Zoe. Anthony Trueman (Nicholas Bailey) is revealed as her other parent, shortly before she commits patricide by murdering him to protect Zoe. Her later storylines on the soap have included feuding with Oscar's father Max Branning (Jake Wood), her arrest for Anthony's murder, the introduction of her twin brother, Josh Goodwin (Joshua Vaughan), and coping with Zoe's death from a head injury.

== Casting and characterisation ==
The character's initial appearance was in an episode broadcast on 3 September 2025. She was shown in flashback scenes as an unnamed and uncredited baby that Zoe Slater (Michelle Ryan) gives birth to. Zoe gave birth to twins: a boy and a girl. Minutes after the birth, she is informed that there has been a complication and she assumes her daughter has died, promptly leaving the hospital. Weeks later, it was announced that Indeyarna Donaldson-Holness had been cast as "mysterious newcomer" Jasmine Fisher. Jasmine has been described as a resourceful young woman who would soon make enemies in Walford, as well as a "feisty little number". However, it was also stated that her "instinct might always be to run from her problems". At the time, it was not publicised that she had any connection to Zoe; although, Radio Times suspected that she may be Zoe's daughter since no death was confirmed by hospital staff. However, the Daily Mirror wondered if she was instead connected to Cindy via Jackie Ford, a criminal who Cindy informed on in the 1990s.

== Development ==
=== Introduction ===
Donaldson-Holness made her onscreen debut in the episode broadcast on 23 September 2025. Her first scene sees her looking upon the Prince Albert, Cindy Beale's (Michelle Collins) gay bar. She described it as one of her standout scenes from her time on EastEnders as she got to witness Mo Harris (Laila Morse) calling someone a "stupid cow". In her next scene, she approaches Cindy for a job; she initially refuses to hire her, particularly as she knows nothing about Jasmine. However, Jasmine proves herself to Cindy and is offered a job. Elaine Peacock (Harriet Thorpe), the bar manager, is not keen on Jasmine and it was confirmed that Jasmine would soon make enemies within Albert Square. Jasmine creates curiosity around her when she does not provide Elaine with identification documents for work purposes and her reason for being in Walford is wanting to get away from family. She then quizzes Cindy with numerous questions about her past, such as asking how many children she has.

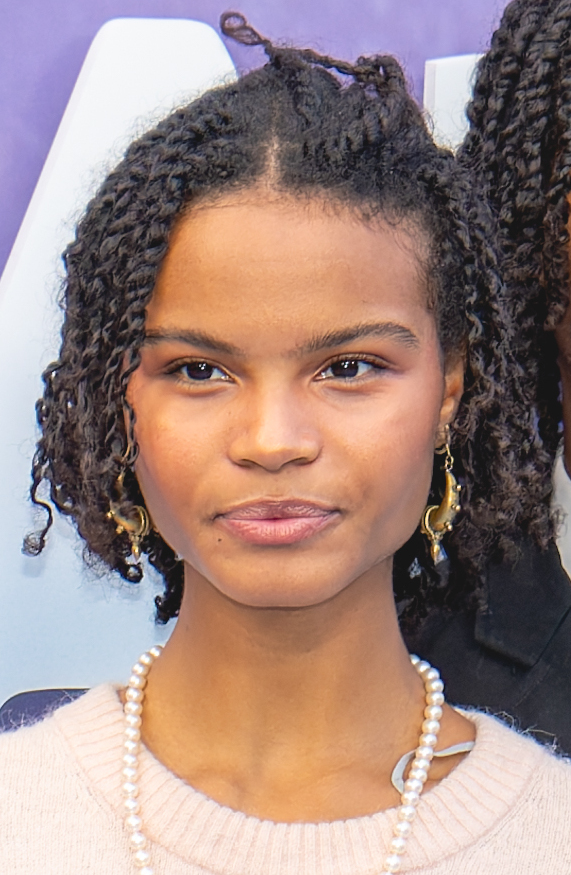
Jasmine's (portrayed by Indeyarna Donaldson-Holness, pictured) reason for arriving in Walford was not publicised for months.

Jasmine meets Oscar Branning (Pierre Counihan-Moullier) the next day, who flirts and asks Jasmine on a date. She declines the date invite, but remains flirty. Cindy is "quick to step in" and warns Jasmine against Oscar, with an insider from the soap stating "Oscar's reputation precedes him when it comes to love interests". However, a character who knows her own mind, Jasmine decides to keep talking to Oscar. Jasmine and Oscar's bond "ramps up" when she agrees to go on a date with him. Digital Spy wrote that their relationship would see trouble ahead, but felt that Oscar had "fallen head over heels" for Jasmine.

In October 2025, it was confirmed that Jasmine would share a storyline with Gina Knight (Francesca Henry). Gina is upset about the random disappearance of her boyfriend, Harry Mitchell (Elijah Holloway), believing he is in Cardiff cheating on her. Jasmine offers emotional support to Gina, but it becomes apparent that Jasmine has "an ulterior motive" for making a friend as she once again asks questions about Cindy, Gina's mother. The Metro wrote that her "true colours" show once the subject of Cindy arises, with her "carefully curated charm" cracking when Jasmine presses for information on her. Oscar interrupts Jasmine and Gina talking, and fed up, Jasmine snaps at him, making him leave. She then suggests her and Gina go on a night out together to de-stress.

Jasmine and Gina's night out "pans out in a way that neither of them were expecting" and Digital Spy's Joe Anderton hoped it would lead to viewers getting to learn more about Jasmine, a character he felt was "surrounded by mystery". The event was later shown to be Nigel Bates (Paul Bradley), who has dementia, driving in his car and accidentally driving in their way. Jasmine pushes Gina out of the way, but is struck by his car. Jasmine demands a confused Nigel get help for them, shouting out that she cannot die until she has gotten revenge on an unnamed woman, before falling unconscious. Once conscious, Jasmine fuelled further intrigue when she informs Oscar she has asked her mother not to visit her in hospital, especially when Jasmine's mother abides by her request.

=== Cindy's suspicions and attack ===
Jasmine "continues to raise eyebrows" and Elaine becomes more curious about Jasmine's identity, since she has had numerous excuses for not providing Elaine with legal documents for work. Elaine persuades Oscar to aid her in searching online for details about Jasmine, but they find nothing and are caught by Jasmine, who is upset with the pair. She explains that she had a tough upbringing and was not allowed social media until the age of 18, which satisfies Oscar due to his "adoration" of Jasmine. In the "sinister next stage" of her storyline, Jasmine wants a place to live in Walford and asks Oscar's family to take her in, who agree. Cindy, who lives with Oscar, goes away to visit her sister, leaving her bedroom unoccupied. Jasmine suggests that she could sleep in there and Radio Times wondered if Cindy was in danger.

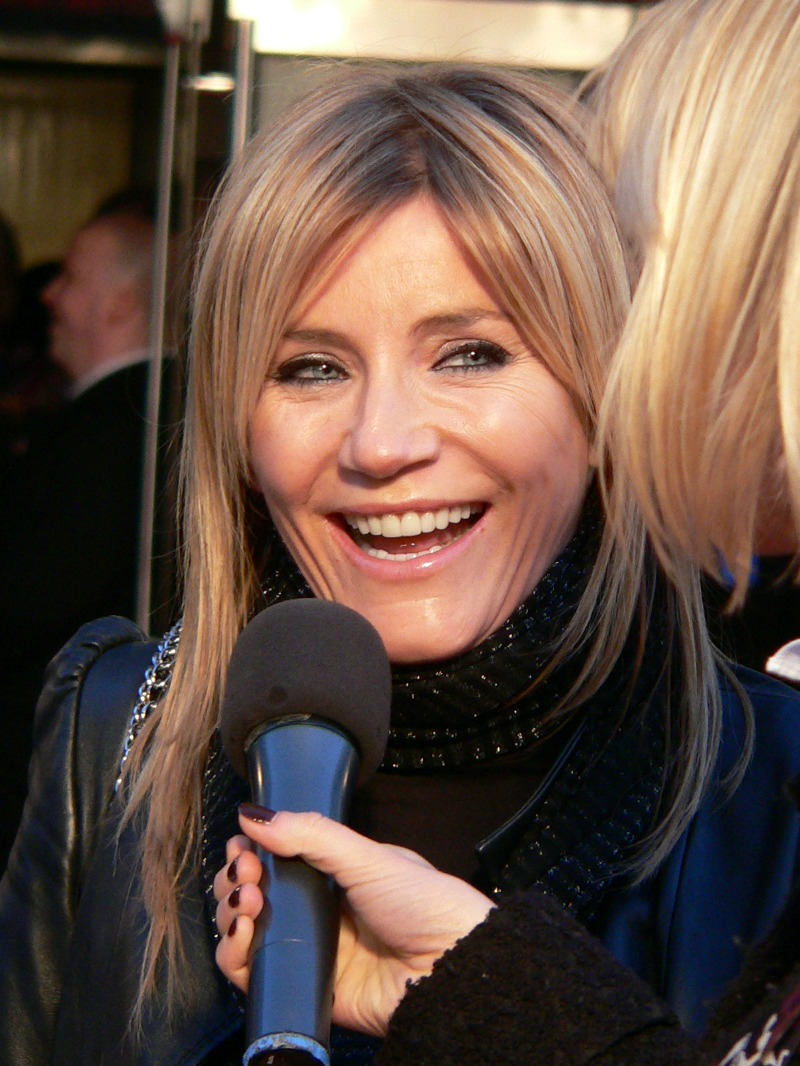
Cindy Beale (Michelle Collins, pictured) fears Jasmine wants to harm her.

Jasmine steals Anthony Trueman's (Nicholas Bailey) keys to the Panesar House Surgery, where he works as a doctor. Oscar discovers what she has done, and Jasmine plays it off that she was wanting a quiet place for them to have sex, convincing him to join her. However, once they are there, Oscar is "rattled" when Jasmine quickly gets to logging into the computers and searches for a specific patient record. It becomes obvious to Oscar that it is not a random stunt, but that Jasmine is calculated and her "mask is slowly starting to slip more and more". Cindy learns that Jasmine's national Insurance number does not match her name, as well as Oscar's older sister Lauren Beale (Jacqueline Jossa) informing her that Jasmine stole Anthony's keys. Cindy and Lauren go on Jasmine's phone and ring the contact labelled 'Mum': Anita Fisher (Yasmine Holness-Dove). Cindy meets with her and is shocked when she says that Jasmine has a dark side, as well as Anita saying that her ex-husband comes from a dark family.

Cindy finds Jasmine on the stairs of The Prince Albert and accuses her of being a relative of Jackie Ford that wants revenge on Cindy, revealing she has met with Anita. Cindy draws in closer and closer to Jasmine's face, and infuriated at Cindy for delving into her life, she pushes her away from her. Cindy hurtles down the stairs and is unresponsive. Oscar finds Cindy and rushes to inform his family; he then finds Jasmine packing her bags. She explains that it was an accident and her actions were merely self-defence. Oscar initially believes her, but is convinced by Ian Beale (Adam Woodyatt) that Jasmine is part of the Ford family. He then ends their relationship. Kept in hospital overnight following surgery, Cindy receives a "frightening" visit when Jasmine stands over her bed. She walks out, but Cindy awakens and sees Jasmine heading out of the door.

=== Parentage reveal and patricide ===
December 2025 saw Jasmine continue to be the centre of dramatic storylines in the soap. She sees Zoe struggling with shopping and offers her help; she accepts and buys Jasmine a drink in the Queen Victoria public house, where Zoe works and lives. Jasmine vents about her relationship issues with Oscar, to which Zoe comforts her. She then asks Zoe about her life and if she ever had children. A "touchy subject" for Zoe since she believes one of her children died and is unable to find the other, she lies and states she never wanted any. Hurt, Jasmine sneaks out whilst Zoe is buying her another drink. As a furious Jasmine sits outside of The Queen Vic, it transpires that Zoe is Jasmine's mother. Anthony, who is "harbouring a dark obsession" with Zoe, learns that he shares children with Zoe, revealing him as Jasmine's father.

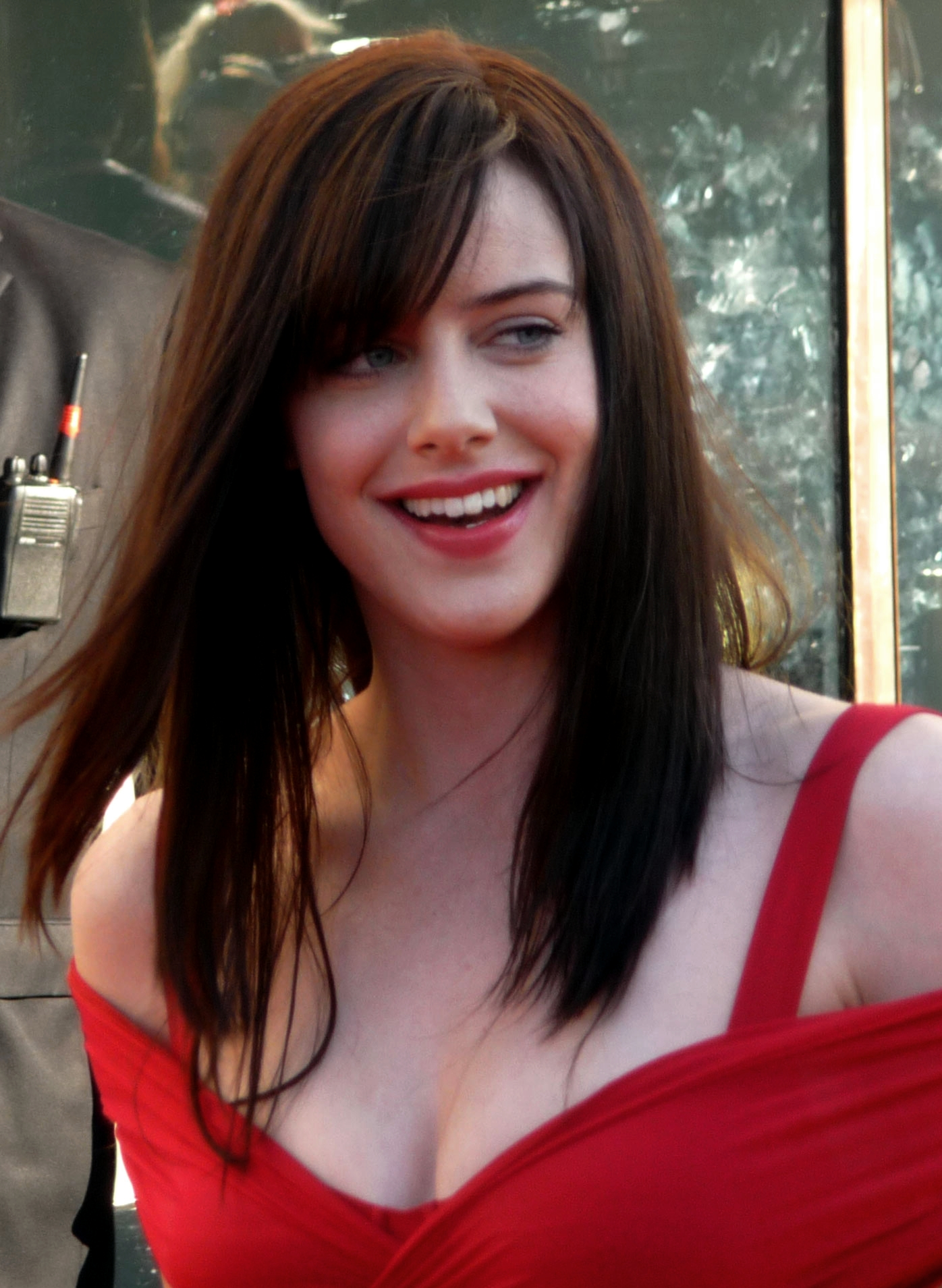
Jasmine commits patricide against Anthony Trueman (Nicholas Bailey) to protect her mother, Zoe Slater (Michelle Ryan, pictured).

In an unannounced return over the Christmas 2025 period, Chrissie Watts (Tracy-Ann Oberman) arrives and is revealed as the person responsible for various torment that has been happening to Zoe for months. However, it also transpires that Jasmine has been conspiring with Chrissie, stalking and performing the acts against Zoe on her behalf. Chrissie was imprisoned for 20 years for her part in murdering Den Watts (Leslie Grantham) while Zoe escaped punishment, resulting in Chrissie's grudge against her. Speaking about Chrissie's connection to Jasmine, Oberman said: "What started off as a game for Chrissie, has ended up becoming a little bit of an obsession, and finding this gorgeous daughter, who was also hurt by Zoe, seemed like too good of an opportunity to miss". She felt Jasmine had become a "daughter [Chrissie] never had" and that she wanted to empower Jasmine to get revenge on her mother for seemingly abandoning her.

On Christmas Day, Anthony is murdered whilst he is trying to attack Zoe. Only Zoe is found at the scene of his death, leading to her arrest for his murder. Jasmine and her newfound grandmother, Kat Moon (Jessie Wallace), theorise that Chrissie is responsible for his murder in an attempt to frame Zoe as part of her revenge mission. Jasmine confides in Oscar about her true identity, who is "reeled and struggles to digest the information". His only advice for her is to visit Patrick Trueman (Rudolph Walker), her newfound grandfather, who is grieving for Anthony. She arrives drunk with flowers, but Patrick believes it is an act of torment from the Slater family and refuses to see her.

Despite her stalking of Zoe, the family forgives her and allows her to continue living with them; however, Jean Slater (Gillian Wright) is convinced that Jasmine is evil and responsible for Anthony's murder, so confronts her in Jasmine's bedroom. The "confrontation suddenly escalates", but Oscar and Alfie Moon (Shane Richie) intervene before Jean can harm her. It transpires that Jean is correct about Jasmine, despite other Slaters believing that Jean is having a bipolar episode. It is revealed whilst she visits his dead body, showing a video on her phone of the incident; her protecting Zoe, as well as hitting him across the head with a salt lamp in self-defence.

=== Feud with Max Branning and brother reveal ===
Jasmine feels that she does not belong in Walford, and due to the character's habit of running away from problems, she convinces Oscar to escape with her. She is aware that she is leaving Zoe in prison, but "shows little remorse for killing Anthony and is also willing to let Zoe go down for a crime she didn't commit". A producer said: "Jasmine feels as though she doesn't belong on the Square. She sees a future with Oscar, but she hasn't learnt how to trust the Slaters yet. She wants to run before they abandon her." Still angry over Jasmine pushing her down the stairs, Cindy warns Oscar's father, Max Branning (Jake Wood), to stop them leaving. Oscar becomes torn between Jasmine and his father, and as "Max and Jasmine's row reaches fever pitch", Jasmine drops a "terrible lie" to blindsight Oscar into leaving with her. She claims Max kissed her and an angry Max attempts to record her admitting her lies, but she notices the phone and keeps up her lie, but the truth is later outed.

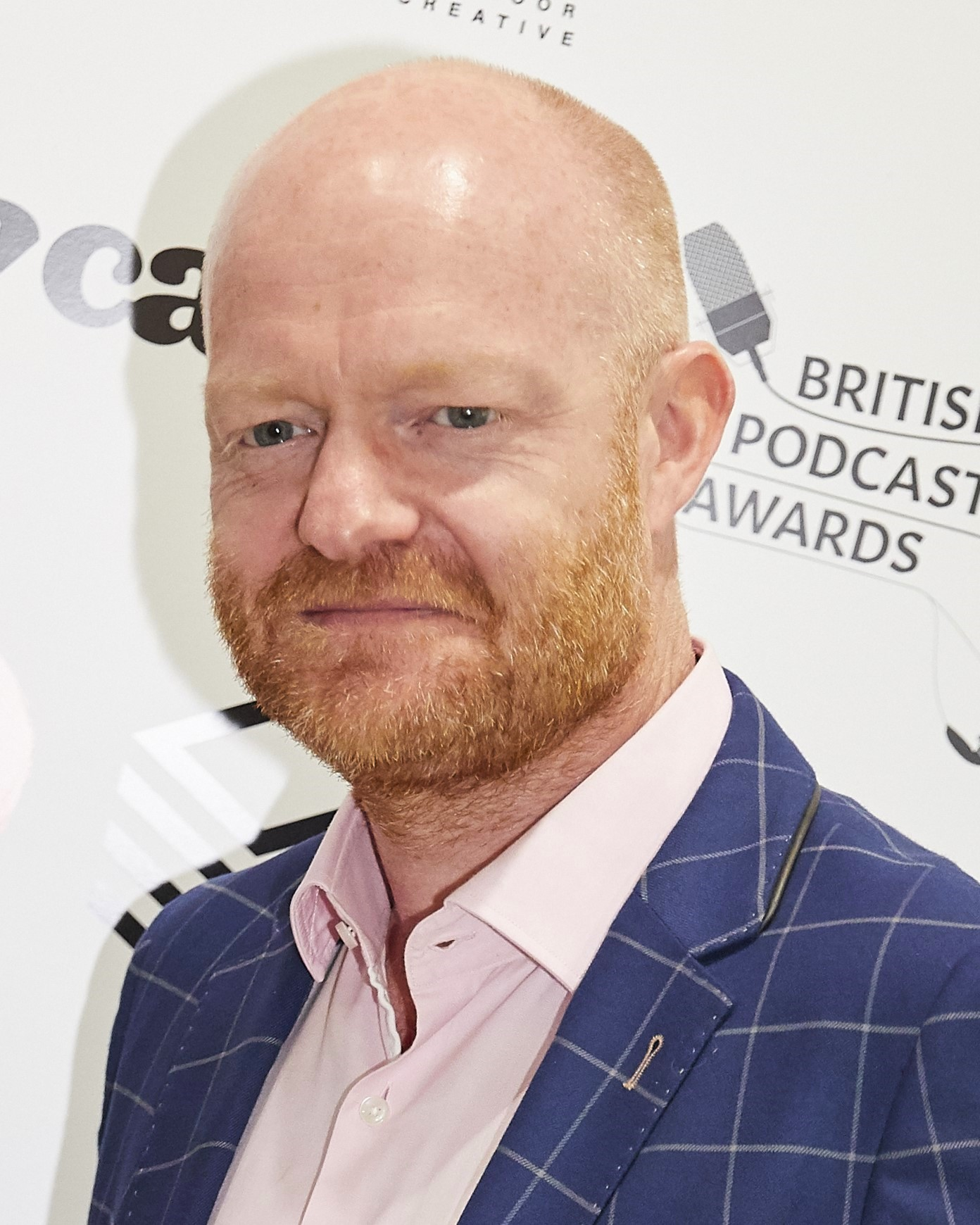
Jasmine wars with Max Branning (Jake Wood, pictured) over his son, Oscar Branning (Pierre Counihan-Moullier).

Jasmine flees from Walford alone, leaving Kat, Oscar and Patrick furious and upset. However, Digital Spy confirmed that her storyline had not concluded and that Donaldson-Holness would return to EastEnders. In her short break away from the series, it was leaked to the media that Joshua Vaughan had been cast as Jasmine's twin brother, Josh Goodwin. Whilst Jasmine is away, Kat forms an alliance with Chrissie, who tells Kat that Jasmine is likely Anthony's murderer. Kat "resorts to ruthless tactics" and lures Jasmine back home by saying she needs to visit a grieving Patrick. Kat takes her aside and presses Jasmine for answers, to which she confesses to murdering him. Kat phones the police and "Jasmine's arrest sends shockwaves around the Square".

Amidst her arrest, Jasmine proclaims that there is evidence on her phone proving murdering Anthony was in self-defence. Zoe, once released, is immediately unfazed by Jasmine's lies and sets to get her justice. She asks numerous people if they have seen it, including Max, who is revealed to have possession of the phone. Cindy learns that Max has Jasmine's phone and steals it; as she is set to smash it, the phone rings. She answers it to Josh, with Vaughan making his debut as Jasmine's twin brother. In February 2026, Vaughan was photographed filming for Jasmine's court trial, as well as Ryan, confirming that Zoe and her twins would be reunited. It was also leaked to media that EastEnders would be airing a "bisexual love triangle in steamy new storyline" featuring Jasmine, Oscar and Josh. It was billed "one of the hottest love triangles in soap history". A producer added: "Oscar is happy with Jasmine but when her twin arrives the chemistry between them is something neither can ignore. It's going to set temperatures soaring in Walford. But with Jasmine having bumped off her dad Anthony Trueman at Christmas the pair had better watch out."

== Reception ==
After Donaldson-Holness' debut episode, Plymouth Live called her "mysterious". Digital Spy wrote in November 2025 that since her introduction, she had been a "talking point" for viewers of the show. Michael Adams of Radio Times agreed and billed her "EastEnders' biggest enigma". After a scene of Jasmine returning home drunk on a milk float, Radio Times felt that she had become a true member of the Slater family, writing she had "let loose in true Slater fashion".
