= Anthony Trueman =

Fictional character in EastEnders

- EastEnders character
- Portrayed by: Nicholas Bailey
- Duration: 2000–2005, 2014, 2025–2026
- First appearance: Episode 2040; 11 December 2000
- Last appearance: Episode 7288; 3 March 2026
- Introduced by: John Yorke (2000); Louise Berridge (2004); Kate Harwood (2005); Dominic Treadwell-Collins (2014); Ben Wadey (2025, 2026)
In-universe information
- Occupation: General practitioner
- Father: Patrick Trueman
- Mother: Audrey Trueman
- Stepmother: Yolande Trueman
- Half-brothers: Paul Trueman; Isaac Baptiste
- Wife: Sophie Trueman (until 2025)
- Sons: Josh Goodwin; Euan Trueman
- Daughters: Jasmine Fisher
- Nieces: Eleanor Trueman

Anthony Trueman is a fictional character from the BBC soap opera EastEnders, played by Nicholas Bailey. He made his first appearance in the episode broadcast on 11 December 2000 and was a regular character before his departure on 11 July 2003, returning in 2004 and 2005 for brief stints for the wedding of his father Patrick Trueman (Rudolph Walker) to Yolande Duke (Angela Wynter) and the funeral of his half-brother Paul Trueman (Gary Beadle). Anthony made a brief return on 22 July 2014 following Patrick's stroke. In July 2025, it was announced Anthony would return later that year for Patrick and Yolande's second wedding. He made his return on 25 August 2025. Anthony was killed off on 25 December 2025 in an unannounced departure. His final scenes, as a corpse, aired on 15 January 2026 where it was revealed that he had been killed by his own daughter, Jasmine (Indeyarna Donaldson-Holness). Bailey reprised the voice of Anthony as part of an AI storyline, in which Patrick speaks to an online version of Anthony following his death. Anthony returned in a voice appearance on 26 February 2026, and departed for a final time on 3 March 2026.

== Creation and development ==
In early 2000, it was announced that a new doctor would arrive in EastEnders. A few days later it was announced he would be played by Nick Bailey. Bailey was working for an investment bank unloading boxes, when he received the call about auditioning for Anthony. He explained "I was alone in the stockroom when my agent's wife rang and told me I'd got the part. I just jumped up and punched the air, then did a rumba round the room." EastEnders marked Bailey's first major television role. Anthony was introduced as the son of B&B owner Audrey Trueman (Corinne Skinner-Carter). He made his first on-screen appearance on 11 December 2000. It was later announced his family would arrive later in the year.

In December 2002, it was announced that Anthony will begin a relationship with Kat Slater (Jessie Wallace). "Kat and Alfie is a romance just waiting to happen and we don't have to wait long," an insider told The People today. "Bosses are convinced they will become the next Den and Angie." Kat, who has only just rekindled her love with her daughter's former fiancé Anthony Trueman, will ditch him after embarrassing herself at a dinner party the Doc has taken her to.

"Kat and Anthony's romance has been on-off from day one," the insider added. "Kat first realises she has a thing for Alfie when he coaches her on table etiquette before the big date. And after the night goes pear-shaped she flings herself at Alfie saying, 'Anthony is not the man for me'. Alfie, who's fancied Kat since he gave her barmaid's job, is delighted. They kiss and soon become a serious item."

Bailey reprised his role in July 2014 for one episode. Anthony returned to Walford following his father's stroke. In 2015, Bailey stated that his return in 2014 was confusing, saying, "Anthony was always a man of duty and responsibility so I don't know why he would abandon his father. It was never explained to me and it was all a bit surreal. I'm baffled myself, but then EastEnders now doesn't resemble the show I was in."

In July 2025, it was announced that Bailey would reprise the role for the wedding of Anthony's father Patrick (Rudolph Walker) and Yolande Trueman (Angela Wynter). Bailey said: "It is an unexpected treat to return to EastEnders and I'm full of gratitude to get the opportunity to revisit the character of Anthony." Producer Ben Wadey went on to say: "It's great to welcome Nicholas back to the EastEnders family to reunite Patrick with his son. But Anthony's plan for a brief return to surprise his father ends up with him staying longer than he expected when he uncovers what has been going on in the Trueman household."<

== Storylines ==
=== 2000–2005 ===
Anthony is the younger son of Patrick (Rudolph Walker) and Audrey Trueman (Corinne Skinner-Carter) and the half brother of Paul Trueman (Gary Beadle). He is the brains of an otherwise dysfunctional family, and his dodgy-dealing brother Paul always feels under his shadow. Anthony works as a doctor in the Square. Audrey becomes deeply involved with his life, while ignoring Paul. She disapproves of Anthony dating Kat Slater (Jessie Wallace) and tries to interfere many times, leading to Anthony rebelling against his mother. When Audrey dies, Anthony's long lost father, Patrick, arrives for Audrey's funeral, reuniting with his two sons after decades apart. Following a period of adjustment, the Trueman brothers accept Patrick; however, Paul grows suspicious of him and secretly performs a DNA test, where it is revealed that although Anthony is Patrick's biological son, Paul is not.

After Kat breaks up with Anthony, he and Kat's teenage daughter Zoe Slater (Michelle Ryan) begin an affair. Zoe disowns Kat for disapproving of their relationship, and later runs away when Anthony reveals that he is still in love with Kat. Anthony and Kat's relationship resumes, but Zoe returns and catches them in bed together. Zoe then accepts they are together. After Kat fails to impress Anthony's colleagues she breaks up with him as he is about to propose. Kat discovers she is pregnant by him and decides to have an abortion. Her boss Alfie Moon (Shane Richie) persuades her not to, but she suffers a miscarriage while on her way to tell Anthony of the pregnancy. Kat then breaks up with Anthony again after realising he is not who she wants. In 2003, when Anthony causes the death of a pregnant patient, he leaves the Square to go travelling, but returns for Patrick's wedding to Yolande Duke (Angela Wynter) and Paul's funeral.

=== 2014 ===
After living in Cambodia for several years, Anthony returns to the UK and settles in Glasgow, marries a woman named Sophie and has children. In 2013, Patrick falls from a ladder and considers staying with Anthony but decides not to. In 2014, Anthony is featured in a medical journal, in an article about his work in Cambodia, a copy of which Patrick buys. After hearing about Patrick's stroke, he returns to Walford, though Patrick mistakes him for Paul. Despite feeling obliged to take care of his father, Anthony admits he cannot forgive Patrick's absence during his childhood. He writes Denise Fox (Diane Parish) a cheque for £2,000 to help look after Patrick and returns to Scotland. In 2020, while the show is offscreen, he returned to look after Patrick in hospital after he contracted COVID-19 during the pandemic. He later invited Patrick and Sheree to stay with him during lockdown and the pair make amends.

=== 2025 ===
In August 2025, Anthony returns to Walford for Patrick's upcoming wedding to Yolande. He reveals that Sophie and the children are in Beijing visiting her family. Anthony is furious to learn that Patrick was recently attacked in a robbery, and feuds with Oscar Branning (Pierre Counihan-Moullier) after he admits to being responsible. He urges Patrick to press charges, and becomes suspicious of Howie Danes (Delroy Atkinson) when he persuades Patrick to drop the charges. Following a heated argument, Anthony punches Howie, but they seem to make amends. After Zoe returns to Walford and is shot, Anthony helps stabilise her until the paramedics arrive. When Zoe is discharged, Anthony defends her when she has a physical altercation with Vicki Fowler (Alice Haig). However, when Anthony tries to kiss Zoe, she tells him to stay away from her. He then admits to Yolande that his feelings for Zoe have resurfaced.

It soon emerges that Anthony has separated from Sophie and begins working as the local GP again. After his patient Penny Branning (Kitty Castledine) complains of a ring that went missing in the post and noticing Howie using a similar ring to propose to Denise's sister Kim Fox (Tameka Empson), he deduces that Howie has stolen the ring through his job as a postman. Anthony demands that Howie confess to the theft, but agrees to keep it a secret when Howie rings Sophie and discovers that she has a restraining order against him. Howie fears Anthony may be unsafe to Kim's children and informs her of the restraining order; when she confronts Anthony, she convinces him that Sophie is simply doing it to get revenge on him and nothing more. Anthony learns from Oscar that Howie witnessed Patrick's attack and used it to blackmail Oscar into gaining the stolen money; this revelation leads to a furious Anthony exposing Howie at his and Kim's engagement party, ending Kim and Howie's relationship. Kim reveals the truth about the restraining order to Patrick, leaving the rest of the family deeply distrustful of Anthony, despite his attempts to convince them that Sophie's allegations are baseless.

Anthony becomes obsessed with Zoe, who is being tormented by a mysterious stalker. His attempts to resume a relationship with Zoe are derailed when she learns of Sophie's restraining order. Regardless, Anthony agrees to help Zoe locate her missing twins whom she abandoned after birth in 2006 by searching the hospital's medical records; he ultimately deduces from the date of birth that he is the biological father. Enraged that Zoe would keep this a secret from him, he lies to Kat by claiming that both babies died after birth so that he can find them himself. He drunkenly confesses his plans to Chelsea Fox (Zaraah Abrahams), who tells Kat and Zoe the truth on Christmas Day. Horrified at his son's actions, Patrick disowns Anthony and wishes him dead, leaving an upset Anthony to storm out. Later that night, a drunken Anthony confronts Zoe in the Queen Vic, resulting in a fight which knocks Zoe out. Zoe later wakes up beside Anthony's corpse and believes Anthony has died from a blow he sustained during the fight. Despite Kat's protests, Zoe calls the emergency services; paramedics subsequently confirm Anthony's death while Zoe is charged with his murder. Shortly afterwards, local resident Jasmine Fisher (Indeyarna Donaldson-Holness) is revealed to be Anthony and Zoe's biological daughter and it transpires that she had killed Anthony by bludgeoning him with a salt lamp to protect Zoe after he knocked Zoe out. Jasmine is arrested when Kat turns her into the police to exonerate Zoe, but Jasmine is later found not guilty of his murder at her trial and released.
