= Oscar Branning =

- EastEnders character
- Pierre Counihan-Moullier as Oscar Branning (2026)
- Portrayed by: Gabriel Miller-Williams (2007–2008); Neo Hall (2008–2015); Charlee Hall (2013–2017); Pierre Counihan-Moullier (2025–present)
- Duration: 2007–2015; 2017; 2025–present
- First appearance: Episode 3487; 14 December 2007
- Introduced by: Diederick Santer (2007); Sean O'Connor (2017); Ben Wadey (2025)
In-universe information
- Occupation: Student; Market trader
- Family: Branning
- Father: Max Branning
- Mother: Tanya Branning
- Stepfather: Greg Jessop
- Stepmother: Kirsty Branning; Rainie Cross; Cindy Beale
- Sisters: Lauren Branning; Abi Branning
- Half-brothers: Bradley Branning
- Half-sisters: Annie Carter
- Grandfathers: Jim Branning
- Grandmothers: Cora Cross; Reenie Branning
- Uncles: Derek Branning; Jack Branning
- Aunts: Carol Jackson; April Branning; Suzy Branning; Rainie Cross; Ava Hartman
- Nephews: Louie Beale; Jimmy Beale
- Nieces: Abi Branning
- First cousins: Bianca Jackson; Sonia Fowler; Robbie Jackson; Billie Jackson; Joey Branning; Alice Branning; Penny Branning; Amy Mitchell; Ricky Branning; James Branning; Dexter Hartman
- Other relatives: Liam Butcher; Tiffany Butcher; Morgan Butcher

Oscar Branning is a fictional character from the BBC soap opera EastEnders. Introduced on 14 December 2007, he was initially portrayed by child actors including Gabriel Miller-Williams, Neo Hall and Charlee Hall, before being recast in 2025, with Pierre Counihan-Moullier taking over the role. His birth saw him born into the Branning family at a tumultuous time; his father, Max Branning (Jake Wood) is soon exposed for having an affair, which sees him primarily cared for by his mother, Tanya Branning (Jo Joyner). Oscar initially departed from EastEnders in 2017.

Upon the role being recast to Counihan-Moullier, it saw Oscar receive more mature storylines. This began with him feeling abandoned by his parents as a result of his involvement with gangs, which saw him serve a sentence in a youth offender institution. Following his release, he is taken in by his elder sister, Lauren Branning (Jacqueline Jossa). Other focuses have been his friendship and eventual attack on Patrick Trueman (Rudolph Walker), his rocky relationship with Jasmine Fisher (Indeyarna Donaldson-Holness), reconciling with Max and unknowingly becoming romantically involved with Jasmine's twin brother, Josh Goodwin (Joshua Vaughan). Throughout his latest tenure, Oscar has been shown to be a comedic, cheeky and sarcastic character, which viewers have praised. He has also been accredited with being the standout of a revival for the Branning family. For his portrayal of Oscar, Counihan-Moullier was nominated for Best Soap Newcomer at the TV Choice Awards.

== Casting and characterisation ==
Oscar, the child of Tanya (Jo Joyner) and Max Branning (Jake Wood), was born onscreen in the episode broadcast on 14 December 2007. Whilst the character was a baby, he was originally played by Gabriel Miller-Williams. In 2008, Miller-Williams was fired since the BBC were cutting costs; it had cost £300 a day to transport him to the set from his home in Leigh-on-Sea. His mother, Claire, said she was going to sue the BBC as she only found out he was sacked after a taxi had failed to pick him up. Of the situation, she said: "It's a disgusting way to treat people. We still haven't had a call explaining why he was sacked. I've sent his contract to solicitors to investigate legal action." A spokesperson for the BBC stated that they had informed Miller-Williams' agent prior to their decision was made, as well as announcing their intention to hire local baby actors to save money. Following the termination of Miller-Williams' contract, twins Neo and Charlee Hall shared the role of Oscar intermittently from 2008 to 2015. Charlee also portrayed Oscar for a one-off appearance in 2017, when Oscar visits Max for Father's Day.

In 2025, it was announced that Oscar would be returning to EastEnders after an eight-year break. Pierre Counihan-Moullier was recast in the role. Executive producer Ben Wadey, who reintroduced the character, said that upon his return, he is "very much a Branning". Counihan-Moullier stated that viewers should "be prepared for the unexpected" as the character had become complex. Digital Spy described Oscar as a "chaotic teenager who feels like both of his parents have abandoned him". Counihan-Moullier required a "characterisation day" with Wadey and the production team, since he was not an avid viewer of EastEnders prior to his casting. Jacqueline Jossa, who portrays his on-screen sister Lauren Branning, revealed that he had asked Adam Woodyatt, an original cast member, how long he had been on the series. Counihan-Moullier added: "He was actually super chill about it".

== Development ==
=== Early storylines ===
Oscar was born onscreen in the episode broadcast on 14 December 2007. He is delivered by Max as Tanya had left it too late to go to hospital. Oscar is named by his sister, Abi Branning (Lorna Fitzgerald). Shortly after Oscar's birth, it transpires that Max has been having a long-term affair with Stacey Slater (Lacey Turner). Tanya and Max, despite failed reunions, then feud for numerous years, leaving Oscar constantly placed between his two parents. Tanya eventually marries Greg Jessop (Stefan Booth) and he moves in with them. Tanya later moves Oscar to Exeter so that Oscar's other sister, Lauren, can go to rehab for her addiction to alcohol.

After Tanya announces plans to do a fashion course in Manchester, she allows Oscar to stay with Max for a while, but he returns to live with Tanya when Max is arrested and charged with the murder of Lucy Beale (Hetti Bywater). Oscar's uncle, Jack Branning (Scott Maslen), arranges for Oscar to visit Max on Father's Day in 2017, which marked his initial final appearance.

=== Recast and gang involvement ===
In May 2025, British tabloids including The Sun began reporting that EastEnders would be reintroducing Oscar after an eight-year break from the soap. The reports were confirmed a month later, with the announcement that Counihan-Moullier would be taking over the role of Oscar. His return aired in July of that year, with a 17-year-old Oscar being released from a youth offender institution. His return was considered part of a revival for the Branning family, with Max also announced as returning to the soap after four years, as well as Penny Branning (Kitty Castledine) having been reintroduced a year prior. Upon his return, Oscar was quickly established as bisexual.

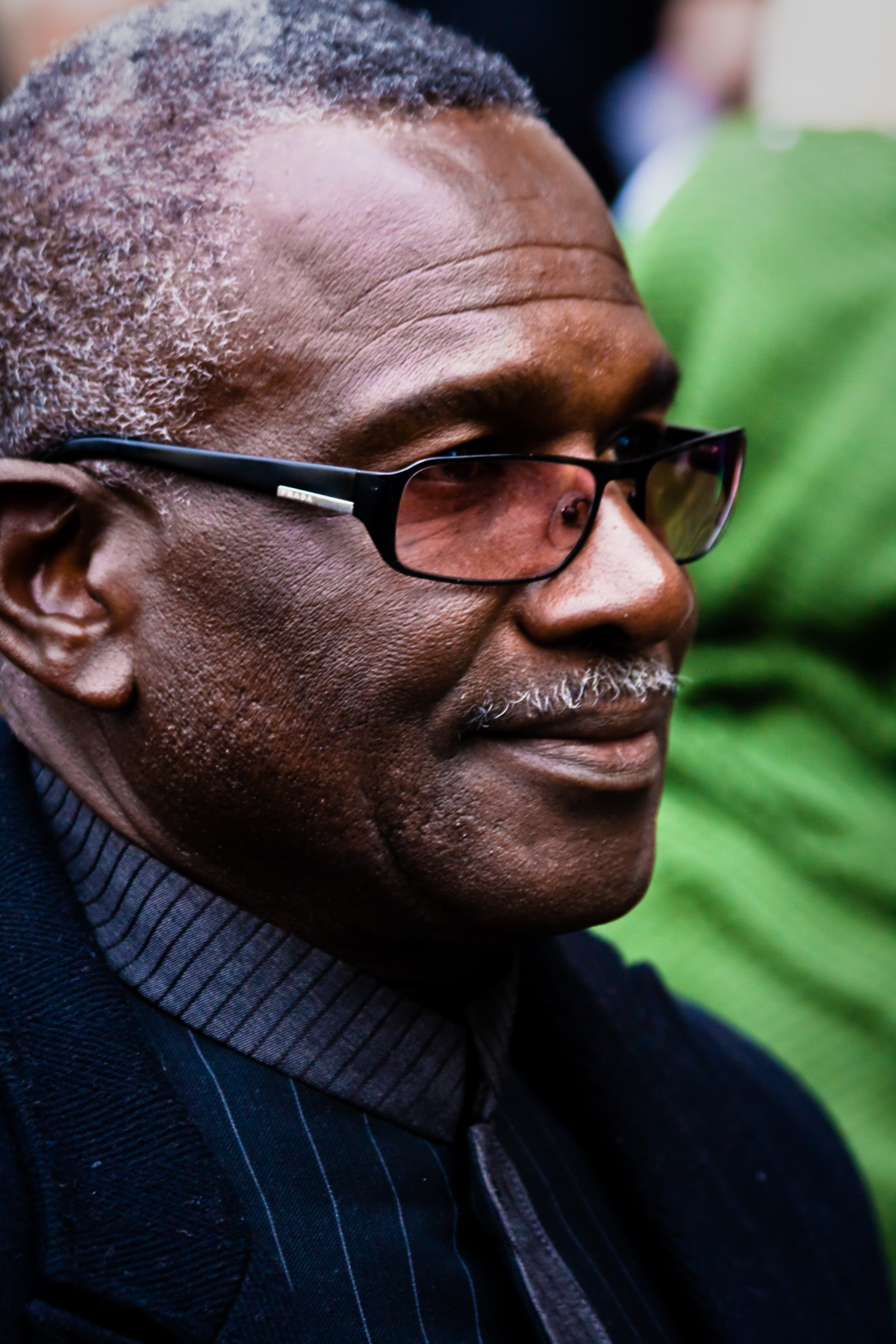
Oscar builds a friendship with Patrick Trueman (Rudolph Walker), but later steals money from him and attacks him.

Oscar's arrival to Walford is a result of begging Lauren to allow him to live with her, Peter Beale (Thomas Law) and their sons. Peter is anxious about the decision, particularly after it transpires that Tanya kicked him out after a gang petrol bombed their house due to Oscar's actions. A member of the gang, Fat Mike (Tai Hilferink), finds him and continues to hassle him. A source told Digital Spy: "When Oscar arrived in Walford last week, it soon became clear that he was running from a dangerous fella called Mike. The pair went joyriding together and Oscar was caught, but he gave the police Mike's name to try and reduce his sentence. Now Mike wants revenge, and Oscar is in serious trouble! He's tried to make a fresh start in Albert Square, but Mike's sinister text messages have left him terrified." They continued by explaining how their actions have affected Oscar: "Oscar goes on the attack and lashes out, thinking that Mike is still out to get him, but he doesn't realise that the mystery intruder is just Peter! [...] Peter is furious about this incident and orders him to leave – he's finally had enough of Oscar's antics."

Mike demands £5000 from Oscar, affirming he will not harm any of his family in return. On the choice Oscar has been given, actor Counihan-Moullier remarked that Oscar would always choose the worst option he is given. He reckoned Oscar should go to his uncle, Jack, a police officer, but the character believes he can raise the funds. Oscar learns Patrick Trueman (Rudolph Walker), who he has recently befriended, has won money on a bet and forms the idea to steal it from him. Counihan-Moullier explained: "This is the last thing he wants to do, but he’s deeply concerned by Mike and feeling quite alone in this. In his head, he thinks that Patrick wasn't expecting to have this money, so it won't hurt him if Oscar takes it". He is caught by Howie Danes (Delroy Atkinson) and in a bid to distract him, Oscar pushes Patrick to the ground, leaving him unconscious. Despite his actions, Counihan-Moullier felt that although Oscar had "done some bad things, he's not a bad person". Howie, who is also suffering from money problems, blackmails Oscar and Lauren, making them give him the money. To avoid it getting out, Howie persuades Patrick to not press charges against Oscar.

=== Meeting Jasmine Fisher ===
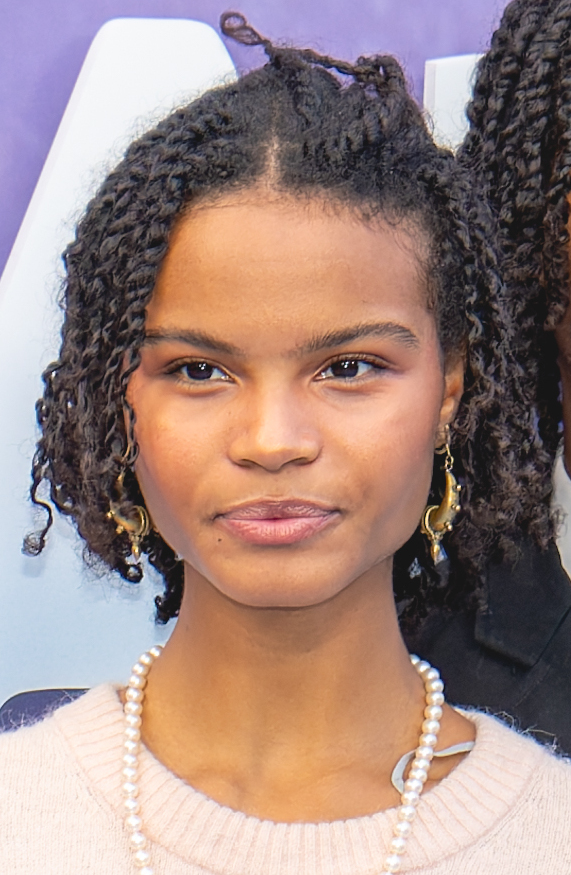
Oscar forms a tumultuous relationship with Jasmine Fisher (Indeyarna Donaldson-Holness)

A high-profile story arc for Oscar came in the form of a love interest, Jasmine Fisher (Indeyarna Donaldson-Holness). After feeling beaten down due to his friendship with Patrick ending, his spirits are lifted when he meets Jasmine. However, Cindy Beale (Michelle Collins), Peter's mother, tries to "scupper his romance". She warns Jasmine to stay away from Oscar, knowing about his interest in hook-ups and not committing to one partner. Oscar remains undeterred and pursues Jasmine regardless, eventually taking her out on a date. After a few weeks, Oscar begins to become suspicious of Jasmine's intentions in Walford and is particularly concerned with her family life.

Oscar is convinced by Jasmine's manager, Elaine Peacock (Harriet Thorpe), to join her in searching online for details about Jasmine. They find nothing and are caught by Jasmine, who is upset with the pair. She explains that she had a tough upbringing and was not allowed social media until the age of 18, which satisfies Oscar due to his "adoration" of Jasmine. Jasmine later needs a place to live in Walford and asks Oscar and his family to take her in, who agree. Jasmine steals Anthony Trueman's (Nicholas Bailey) keys to the Panesar House Surgery, where he works as a doctor. Oscar discovers what she has done, and Jasmine plays it off that she was wanting a quiet place for them to have sex, convincing him to join her. However, once they are there, Oscar is "rattled" when Jasmine quickly gets to logging into the computers and searches for a specific patient record. It becomes obvious to Oscar that it is not a random stunt, but that Jasmine is calculated and her "mask is slowly starting to slip more and more".

Oscar finds Cindy unconscious at the bottom of a flight of stairs and rushes to inform his family; he then finds Jasmine packing her bags. She explains that she pushed her, but affirms that it was an accident and her actions were self-defence. Oscar initially believes her, but is convinced by Ian Beale (Adam Woodyatt) that Jasmine is part of a family from Cindy's past who seek revenge on her. He then ends their relationship since he feels he does not know who Jasmine truly is.

=== Reconciling with Max and love triangle ===
In a press conference, executive producer Ben Wadey stated that he would be putting Oscar and his fellow Brannings at the "heart of the show" as part of their ongoing family revival. When Max returns to Walford, Oscar's damaged relationship with him is explored. Most of the residents are fairly unhappy to see him; however, Oscar is delighted. Despite this, he soon shares a "devastating exchange" with him. He learns Max is not sticking around and pleads with him to stay, saying it would mean a lot. Max refuses and Oscar realises Max does not want a relationship with him, leading him to break down in tears at Lauren and Peter's wedding.

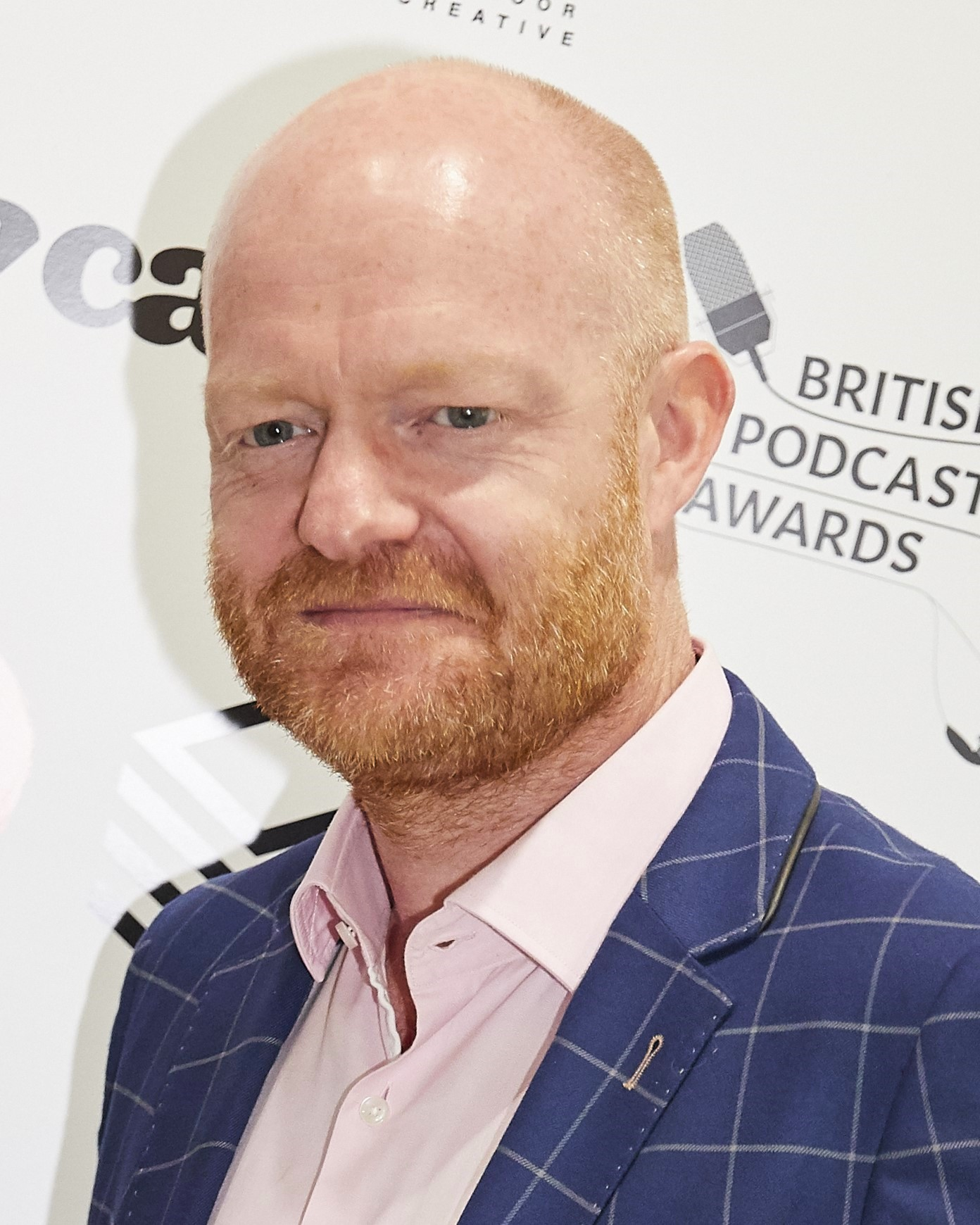
Oscar's father, Max Branning (Jake Wood) returns to Walford to repair their relationship.

Whilst he is still coming to grips with the end of his and Jasmine's relationship, Max once again returns to Walford, wanting to make amends with Oscar and Lauren. Speaking about Max's relationship with his children, actor Jake Wood acknowledged that Max had been a weak father figure and that he did not blame Oscar and Lauren for wanting to "wash their hands with him". When Oscar is rushed to hospital for saving Zoe Slater (Michelle Ryan) from a fire, Max stays by his bedside until he awakens. Despite Max wanting to repair their bond, he soon lets him down by not meeting him for an arranged drink. Oscar then "feels let down by his dad’s actions". He gets drunk and later joins his family at the town's community carol concert, where he exposes a secret "that leaves [Max] utterly floored and threatens to ruin the family festivities". He drunkenly blurts out that Annie Carter (Lois Hawkins) is Max's secret daughter and that the rest of the family were aware.

Jasmine feels that she does not belong in Walford and convinces Oscar to escape with her. Cindy warms Max to stop them leaving and Oscar becomes torn between Jasmine and his father, and as "Max and Jasmine's row reaches fever pitch", Jasmine drops a "terrible lie" to blindsight Oscar into leaving with her. She claims Max kissed her and an angry Max attempts to record her admitting her lies, but she notices the phone and keeps up her lie. The truth is eventually outed and Oscar bids to trust his father again.

Jasmine flees from Walford alone, but Digital Spy confirmed that Donaldson-Holness was still contracted to return to EastEnders. In her short break away from the series, it was leaked to the media that Joshua Vaughan had been cast as Jasmine's long-lost twin brother, Josh Goodwin. It was also leaked to media that EastEnders would be airing a "bisexual love triangle in a steamy new storyline" featuring Oscar, Jasmine and Josh. It was billed "one of the hottest love triangles in soap history". The pair meet whilst Jasmine is in prison for the murder of Anthony, who she killed in self-defence. They are unaware of each others' identities and kiss in the Prince Albert, the local gay bar, later having sex. They are "stunned" to learn the truth about each other and affirm that they will keep their connection a secret.

Oscar finds evidence that Jasmine killed Anthony in self-defence and meets her in prison, where the two passionately kiss and reconcile their relationship. However, Oscar and Josh have to "fight their sizzling chemistry" when they continue to bump into each other in intimate settings. A producer explained that they were "once totally smitten" and Oscar felt forced to forget about their fling due to his reunion with Jasmine. They added that "his feelings for Josh have far from disappeared" and that the chemistry they share is "something neither can ignore", but felt they should be careful of Jasmine due to her temper.

== Reception ==
For his portrayal of Oscar, Counihan-Moullier was nominated for the Best Soap Newcomer accolade at the 2026 TV Choice Awards. Viewers praised his casting as Oscar upon the character's return. They felt that his appearance was accurate to what the child of Tanya and Max would look like, noting that they could see a resemblance to both characters. They also felt that he had "done his homework" in regards to mirroring Max's mannerisms, as well as those of Dot Branning (June Brown), his step-grandmother, by having a cigarette in hand. Laura Denby, writing for Radio Times, praised his portrayal of Oscar, writing: "Through Moullier's outstanding debut, we've seen how Oscar's bravado falters".

Viewers and critics praised Counihan-Moullier for his scenes during Max's return. They acknowledged that his character was rarely given scenes where he is upset and felt it had given the actor a chance to showcase his vulnerability. One wrote that they were worried he would not stay on EastEnders for long due to his acting capabilities; but another hoped he would stick around since they felt he was "such a perfect fit on the show, for comedy and drama". The Manchester Evening News felt that Oscar had "revitalised the Brannings, since they’d kind of drifted into the background".

Oscar's scenes with Josh have been praised by viewers and media outlets including Attitude, who wrote that their first kiss had "melted hearts". Their "natural chemistry" in their scenes was also complimented by viewers. PinkNews echoed viewers' comments, who felt that Oscar shared "much more chemistry" with Josh than he ever had with Jasmine, but hoped that nobody's hearts would be strained in the storyline.
