= Aayan Ibikunle Shoderu =

English actor (born 1997)

- Born: Westerfield Oreoluwa Ibikunle Shoderu; 30 November 1997 (age 27); Redbridge, London, England
- Occupation: Actor
- Years active: 2017–present
- Television: Casualty; EastEnders

Westerfield Oreoluwa Ibikunle Shoderu (born 30 November 1997), known professionally as Aayan Ibikunle Shoderu, is a British actor. After graduating from the Guildhall School of Music and Drama, he appeared in the BBC medical drama Casualty and the short films Area Boy and Tribal Mark, before joining the BBC soap opera EastEnders as Tobias "Okie" Okyere in 2025.

== Life and career ==
Westerfield Oreoluwa Ibikunle Shoderu was born in 1997 in Redbridge, London and is of Nigerian descent. He appeared in various stage productions including Zero for the Young Dudes (2017), Lil Miss Lady (2018), The Burial at Thebes (2020), UK Drill Project (2022) and Macbeth (2023), the latter of which was with the Guildhall School of Music and Drama, of which he graduated in 2023.

After graduating, he went on to appear in an episode of the BBC medical drama Casualty as Tom Barnes. The same year, he appeared in the short film Area Boy as Bradley. In 2024, he appeared as Olu in the short film Tribal Mark as Olu, and wrote, directed and starred in a stage production of Camp Drill with The Mountains Group. In July 2025, Shoderu joined the cast of the BBC soap opera EastEnders as Tobias "Okie" Okyere. The character is introduced as a drug dealer enlisted by Ravi Gulati (Aaron Thiara), subsequently becomes involved with Harry Mitchell (Elijah Holloway) and turning Kojo Asare (Dayo Koleosho)'s flat into a drug house.

== Filmography ==
| Year | Title | Role | Notes | Ref. |
|---|---|---|---|---|
| 2023 | Casualty | Tom Barnes | Episode: "How to Save a Life" | |
| 2023 | Area Boy | Bradley | Short film | |
| 2024 | Tribal Mark | Olu | Short film | |
| 2025 | EastEnders | Tobias "Okie" Okyere | Regular role | |

== Stage ==
| Year | Title | Role | Venue | Ref. |
|---|---|---|---|---|
| 2017 | Zero for the Young Dudes | Guard | Orange Tree Theatre | |
| 2018 | Lil Miss Lady | Twist | High Rise Theatre | |
| 2020 | The Burial at Thebes | — | Lyric Theatre, Hammersmith | |
| 2022 | UK Drill Project | Chete / Drill hype TV general | High Rise Theatre | |
| 2023 | Macbeth | Witches | Guildhall School of Music and Drama | |
| 2024 | Camp Drill | Person 2 | The Mountains Group | |
