= Ben Wadey =

British television producer (born 1993)

- Born: Benjamin Alan Wadey; December 1993 (age 32); Royal Tunbridge Wells, Kent, England
- Occupation: Television producer
- Years active: 2015–present
- Employer(s): Channel 4 BBC

Benjamin Alan Wadey (born December 1993) is an English television producer, known for serving as commissioning executive for Channel 4 between 2022 and 2025 and is currently serving as the executive producer of the BBC soap opera EastEnders from 2025.

== Life and career ==
=== Early life and television production work ===
Benjamin Alan Wadey was born in December 1993 in Royal Tunbridge Wells, Kent, and studied at the Tunbridge Wells Grammar School for Boys and University of Warwick. His early production work included working as a production trainee for Jeremy Vine's radio show between 2015 and 2016. He held the same position on Newsnight and Doctor Who in 2016, subsequently being promoted to digital producer on the former. In 2017, he joined the BBC medical drama Holby City as script researcher, later being promoted to story assistant, a position he held until January 2019. He went to work as a producer for BBC Studios and went on to serve as the commissioning executive for Channel 4 between 2022 and 2025, during which time he oversaw the soap opera Hollyoaks and commissioned several original dramas, including Generation Z and Brian and Maggie.

=== EastEnders ===
In January 2019, following his departure from Holby City, Wadey joined the BBC soap opera EastEnders as a storyliner, later becoming story editor and remaining in the role until September 2020. During this stint, he was involved in the introduction of the Panesar family. In September 2024, Wadey was announced as the new executive producer of EastEnders. He took over from Chris Clenshaw, who departed the role after three years. Speaking of his appointment as producer, Wadey said: "I'm thrilled to be returning to EastEnders at such an exciting time for the show. Having grown up watching and loving EastEnders, it sparked my passion for television, and I feel I've known the residents of Walford my entire life – so to lead this iconic BBC soap into its next chapter is a true privilege." [...] adding that he couldn't wait to collaborate with the exceptional team at EastEnders and build on Chris Clenshaw's brilliant work to deliver unmissable stories to fans - both those who have been watching for years and those just discovering Albert Square."

Wadey's first credited episode as executive producer was episode 7137, originally broadcast on 16 June 2025, and featured the unannounced return of Zoe Slater (Michelle Ryan), after 20 years away. Wadey was keen to bring back Ryan and said she was on his "wish-list of returnees before stepping into the role" and that he was "absolutely delighted when Ryan agreed to return, and was thrilled to welcome her back to Walford." Wadey has also failed to re-introduce Luke Slater, Zoe's twin, by calling his existence a "parallel universe".

Wadey was also responsible for bringing back Julie Haye (Karen Henthorn) after she made a brief voice cameo earlier in the year, alongside overseeing the reintroduction of Max Branning (Jake Wood) and his son, Oscar Branning (now played by Pierre Counihan-Moullier), as well as the return of Patrick Trueman's (Rudolph Walker) son, Anthony Trueman (Nicholas Bailey), and Sam Mitchell (Kim Medcalf). He also brought back Pat Butcher (Pam St Clement) and Barry Evans (Shaun Williamson) for a one-off episode in December, as Nigel Bates's (Paul Bradley) dementia storyline escalates.

== Filmography ==
Year	Title	Role
2015	The Jeremy Vine Show	Production trainee
2016–2017	Newsnight	Production trainee / digital producer
2016	Doctor Who	Production trainee
2017–2019	Holby City	Script researcher / story assistant
2019–2020	EastEnders	Storyliner / story assistant
2020–2021	BBC Studios	Producer
2022–2025	Channel 4	Commissioning executive
2025–present	EastEnders	Executive producer

Media offices
Preceded by Chris Clenshaw	Executive producer of EastEnders; 16 June 2025 – present	Succeeded by Incumbent
