= Indeyarna Donaldson-Holness =

British actress (born 2000)

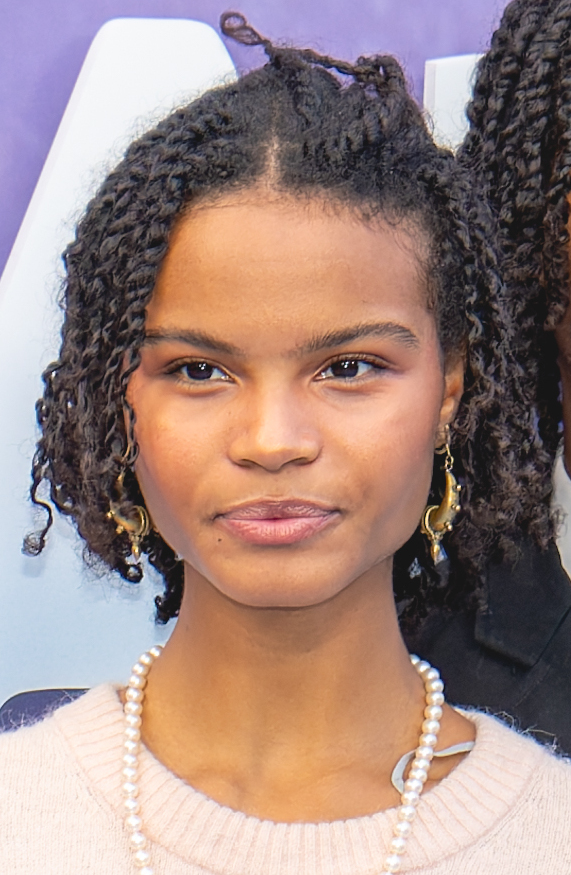
- Donaldson-Holness at the 2024 BFI London Film Festival premiere of That Christmas
- Born: Indeyarna Fusun V. Donaldson-Holness; 16 July 2000 (age 26); Lewisham, London, England
- Occupation: Actress
- Years active: 2011–present

Indeyarna Fusun V. Donaldson-Holness (born 16 July 2000) is an English actress. After making her debut in a West End theatre production of The Lion King and appearing as Lola in Absolutely Fabulous: The Movie (2016), she went on to star as Jody McGory in the Sky Atlantic series Save Me (2018–2020) and as Lucinda Riverty in the ITV drama Deep Water (2019). In 2024, she appeared as Gabrielle "Gabbe" Givens in the Globoplay series Fallen and has portrayed the role of Jasmine Fisher in the BBC soap opera EastEnders since 2025. She also worked as a performer at the immersive experience Phantom Peak just before leaving for the role of Jasmine.

== Early life ==
Indeyarna Fusun V. Donaldson-Holness was born on 16 July 2000 in Lewisham, London. As a child, she began working as a model, for brands including Clarks and Matalan, before beginning her career on stage, appearing as a young Nala in a West End production of The Lion King in 2011.

== Career ==
Holness made her screen debut in 2016, when she appeared as Jane "Lola" Johnson, the daughter of Saffron "Saffy" Monsoon (Julia Sawalha), in the film Absolutely Fabulous: The Movie. In 2018, she joined the cast of the Sky Atlantic series Save Me as Jody McGory. She returned for the second series two years later, and the show subsequently won the BAFTA Award for Best Drama Series. In 2019, she appeared in the ITV drama Deep Water as Lucinda Riverty and as Sophie in the film Days of the Bagnold Summer. In 2024, she starred in the Globoplay series Fallen as Gabrielle "Gabbe" Givens. She is also a teacher and an administrator at the DNPA Performing Arts School in Brockley, London.

In September 2025, Donaldson-Holness joined the cast of the BBC soap opera EastEnders as Jasmine Fisher. Her character was described as "mysterious" and a "resourceful young woman" by the Radio Times and seen using the same dating app as Oscar Branning (Pierre Counihan-Moullier), before being introduced when she asks Cindy Beale (Michelle Collins) for a job at The Prince Albert bar, who initially refuses, but subsequently sacks Freddie Slater (Bobby Brazier) to give her the job instead. Jasmine is later revealed to be the long-lost daughter of Zoe Slater (Michelle Ryan).

== Filmography ==
Year	Title	Role	Notes	Ref.
2016	Absolutely Fabulous: The Movie	Jane "Lola" Johnson	Film role	
2018–2020	Save Me	Jody McGory	Regular role	
2019	Deep Water	Lucinda Riverty	Regular role	
2019	Days of the Bagnold Summer	Sophie	Film role	
2024	Fallen	Gabrielle "Gabbe" Givens	Regular role	
2025–present	EastEnders	Jasmine Fisher	Regular role	

== Stage ==
Year	Title	Role	Venue	Ref.
2011	The Lion King	Young Nala	West End theatre	
