= Nicholas Bailey =

British actor (born 1971)

- Born: 5 July 1971 (age 54); Birmingham, England
- Education: Old Swinford Hospital School; The Blue Coat School, Edgbaston; Cherry Orchard, Birmingham
- Occupation: Actor
- Known for: Portraying Anthony Trueman in EastEnders
- Notable work: EastEnders

Nicholas Richard Bailey (born 5 July 1971 in Birmingham) is a British actor, best known for his role as Anthony Trueman in the soap opera EastEnders. He also participated in the 2006 series of ITV's Soapstar Superstar. He attended Old Swinford Hospital School, Stourbridge; The Blue Coat School, Edgbaston, Birmingham; and Cherry Orchard, Birmingham.

Bailey has also performed in numerous theatre productions, with roles including Macduff in Macbeth at The Mercury Theatre, Colchester, in October 2014; Robert Mugabe's security officer Gabriel in Breakfast with Mugabe; and The Duke of Burgundy in Richard Eyre's production of King Lear at the National Theatre in London. In 2012, Bailey joined the cast of BBC Radio 4 soap opera The Archers as Carl.

== TV and film roles ==
- House of Anubis – Police Officer (2011)
- Doctors – Paramedic / Tim Porter / Steve Tennant / Mr. Fuke / Stuart Houghton (8 episodes, 2001–2014)
- Beautiful People – First Policeman (1 episode, 2008)
- Manchester Passion (2006) (TV) – Peter
- EastEnders – Dr. Anthony Trueman (230 episodes, 2000–2005, 2014, 2025–2026)
- Holby City – Neil Morton (1 episode, 2004)
- Comic Relief 2003: The Big Hair Do (2003) (TV) – Dr. Anthony Trueman
- Sex 'n' Death – (1999) (TV) – Tony, the Great Fandango
- Casualty – Felix (2 episodes, 1998–1999)
- Heartburn Hotel – Prince Ekoku (2 episodes, 1998)
- Performance – Burgundy (1 episode, 1998)
- Coronation Street – Lee Middleton (5 episodes, 1996–1997)
- Accused – Jack Vincent (7 episodes, 1996)
- I.D. (1995) – Mickey
- The Bill – Joseph Tucker (1 episode, 1994)
- London's Burning – Martin (1 episode, 1994)
- Jolly a Man for All Seasons (1994) (TV) (as Nick Bailey) – Classic FM DJ

== Other TV appearances ==
- Walter Tull: Forgotten Hero (2008) (TV) – Himself
- No. 1 Soap Fan (2007) (TV) – Himself
- Most Shocking Celebrity Moments of the 21st Century (2007) (TV) – Himself
- Another Audience with Shirley Bassey (2006) (TV) – Himself / Audience Member
- Soapstar Superstar – Himself / Audience Member / other (9 episodes, 2006)
- This Morning – Himself (3 episodes, 2006)
- Byker Grove – Himself (1 episode, 2005)
- The Importance of Being Famous (2003) (TV) – Himself
- Loose Women – Himself (1 episode, 2003)
- Liquid News – Himself (2 episodes, 2001–03)
- It's Only TV...but I Like It – Himself (1 episode, 2002)
- Sport Relief – (2002) (TV) – Himself
- 2002 Top of the Pops Awards (2002) (TV) – Himself / Presenter
- EastEnders Revealed – Himself (1 episode, 2002)
