= Pierre Counihan-Moullier =

English actor (born 2000)

- Born: Pierre Joseph Counihan-Moullier; 2000 (age 25–26); Brent, London, England
- Occupation: Actor
- Years active: 2007–present
- Television: Cast Offs; EastEnders

Pierre Joseph Counihan-Moullier (born 2000) is an English actor. He began his career as a child, appearing in the Channel 4 series Cast Offs in 2009, before taking over the role of Oscar Branning in the BBC soap opera EastEnders in 2025.

== Early life ==
Pierre Joseph Counihan-Moullier was born in 2000 in Brent, London. He is of French and Irish descent.

== Career ==
He began his career as a child, and appeared in a production of Cries from the Heart at the Royal Court Theatre in 2007. His first credited television role was in the Channel 4 comedy-drama mockumentary series Cast Offs, in which he appeared in the fifth episode as a boy in the street. In 2014, he appeared as Jason in The Surplus at the Young Vic. In 2017, he appeared in The Grand Duke of Florence at Shakespeare's Globe and in 2018, appeared as Jason in My England at the Young Vic. In 2019, he appeared in the BBC Three online comedy series Comedy Threesomes: Oi, Pussy! as Aaron and appeared in The Jumper Factory at the Bristol Old Vic. He also worked as a stunt performer on the Netflix drama series Fate: The Winx Saga. In 2022, he appeared as Griffin in No-One at the Akimbo Theatre. In 2023, he appeared in Houl with the Sept fois la langue company and The Second Woman at the Young Vic.

In June 2025, it was announced that Counihan-Moullier would be joining the cast of the BBC soap opera EastEnders, taking over the role of Oscar Branning from twins Charlee and Neo Hall, who had last appeared as the character eight years prior. Speaking on his casting, Counihan-Moullier said it was "pretty surreal to join EastEnders – it keeps hitting me that I'm actually on Albert Square! When I found out I was joining the Brannings, it was so exciting as they are such an iconic family, and I love that there are so many skeletons in the closet." He also said that the character was "so much fun to play, and the audience should be prepared for the unexpected as he's a complex guy!". His character was the second to be reintroduced by new executive producer Ben Wadey, who said he was "very excited to bring Oscar Branning back to Walford and introduce viewers to him now that he's all grown up [...] adding that he was "delighted to welcome Moullier as he takes on the role and can't wait for viewers to see him bring Oscar to life."

== Filmography ==
=== Television ===
Year	Title	Role	Notes
2009	Cast Offs	Boy in street	Episode: "April"
2019	Comedy Threesomes: Oi, Pussy!	Aaron	Regular role
2021	Fate: The Winx Saga	Stunt performer	Minor role
2025–2027	EastEnders	Oscar Branning	Regular role

== Stage ==
Year	Title	Role	Venue	Ref.
2007	Cries from the Heart	Daniel	Royal Court Theatre	
2014	The Surplus	Jason	Young Vic	
2017	The Grand Duke of Florence	Young man / Squire	Shakespeare's Globe	
2018	My England	Jason	Young Vic	
2019	The Jumper Factory	Protagonist / Jay / Mum	Bristol Old Vic	
2022	No-One	Griffin	Akimbo Theatre	
2023	Houl	Pierre	—N/a	
2023	The Second Woman	Marty	Young Vic	

== Awards and nominations ==
Year	Award	Category	Nominated work	Result	Ref.
2026	TV Choice Awards	Best Soap Newcomer	EastEnders	Nominated	
