= Michelle Ryan =

English actress (born 1984)

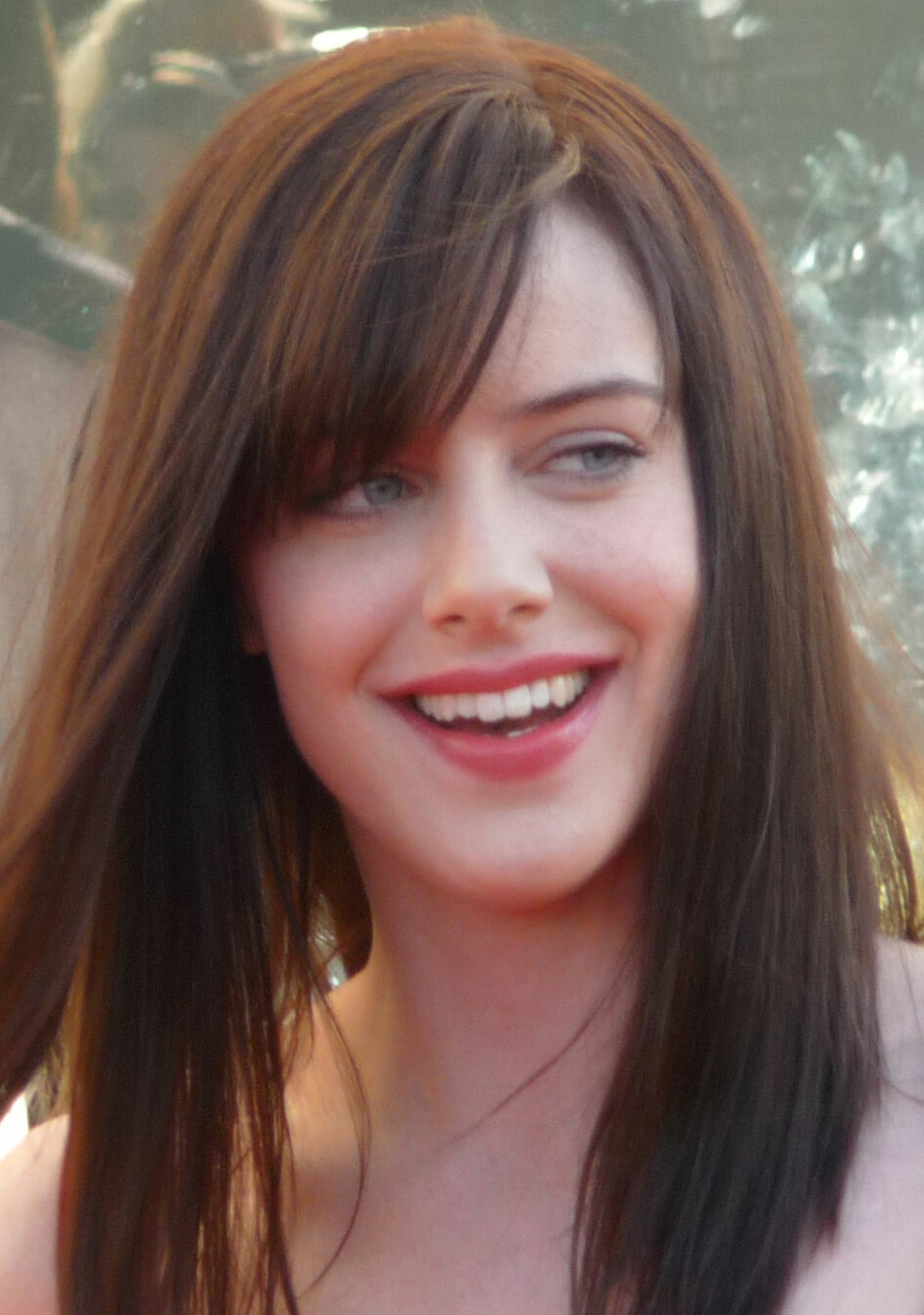
- Ryan in 2009
- Born: Michelle Claire Ryan; 22 April 1984 (age 42); Enfield, London, England
- Occupation: Actress
- Years active: 1999–present
- Television: EastEnders; Bionic Woman; Merlin; Doctor Who

Michelle Claire Ryan (born 22 April 1984) is an English actress, best known for playing Zoe Slater in the BBC soap opera EastEnders (2000–2005, 2025–2026). In 2007, she starred in the American television series Bionic Woman. She also appeared as the evil sorceress Nimueh in the 2008 BBC fantasy series Merlin and as Lady Christina de Souza in the 2009 Doctor Who episode "Planet of the Dead", a role she later reprised in various audio dramas between 2017 and 2023, including her own spin-off in 2017 and 2021.

== Early life and education ==
Michelle Claire Ryan was born on 22 April 1984 in Enfield, London, to Tina, a make-up artist, and Craig Ryan, a firefighter. She attended Chace Community School, and belonged to a local theatre company from the age of 10.

== Career ==
=== 2000–2006: EastEnders and other work ===
Ryan was chosen for the role of Zoe Slater in the BBC soap opera EastEnders when she was 16, making her first appearance in the soap alongside the Slater family in September 2000. Her character's key storylines in the soap included discovering Kat Slater (Jessie Wallace) was her mother and not her sister, as well as being involved in the cover up of the murder of Den Watts (Leslie Grantham). She left the series in June 2005, to further her career.

Following her departure from EastEnders, Ryan appeared in a run of Who's the Daddy? at the King's Head Theatre. The play, by Toby Young and Lloyd Evans, is based on the David Blunkett paternity case. She had a small role in an episode of Agatha Christie's Marple which screened in February 2006, and also appeared in a small independent film the same year, Cashback.

=== 2007–2008: Mansfield Park, Jekyll and Bionic Woman ===
In early 2007, Ryan was seen as Maria in Mansfield Park opposite Billie Piper for ITV and also as Lila in the film I Want Candy, co-starring Carmen Electra and Mackenzie Crook.

In February 2007, it was announced that she had been cast as the lead in the drama Bionic Woman, a remake of the 70s series. The show began airing in the United States on the broadcast network NBC in September 2007. Ryan affected an American accent for the role of Jaime Sommers, except in the episode "The Education of Jaime Sommers" in which her character goes undercover as an English transfer student at a university; for this episode, she spoke in an Oxfordshire accent instead of her natural London accent. She has had professional dance training and attributed it to helping her with the physically demanding stunts required for the show. She also learned Krav Maga and sign language for the part (the latter because, as originally conceived, Ryan's character was to have had a hearing impaired sister, but this story element was abandoned). Ryan stated the show's cancellation came about because it kept changing direction, and stated it led to her being less ambitious about her career. "I'm more go-with-the-flow now", she said.

On Red Nose Day 2007, Ryan appeared in a Mr. Bean sketch written and recorded for Comic Relief.

In May 2007, Ryan revealed she had auditioned the previous year for the role of Vesper Lynd in Casino Royale, eventually given to Eva Green. In late 2007, she appeared in Flick, a Welsh independent film co-starring Faye Dunaway and Leslie Phillips.

Prior to Bionic Woman, she appeared in Jekyll for the BBC, a modern-day version of Strange Case of Dr Jekyll and Mr Hyde starring James Nesbitt. It began its six-episode run on 16 June 2007, and was released on DVD in the United States on 18 September 2007, one week prior to her debut in Bionic Woman.

=== 2008–2011: Merlin, Doctor Who and Mister Eleven ===
She has also appeared as the sorceress Nimueh in the BBC drama series Merlin, playing the role in several episodes of the show's first season.

Ryan also filmed an ITV romantic drama, Mister Eleven, in 2008.

In January 2009, the BBC announced that Ryan had been cast as Lady Christina de Souza in the Doctor Who special episode "Planet of the Dead", which was broadcast on 11 April 2009. She had been rumoured for a part beforehand, and is open to reprising the role in future, although "At the moment, when it comes to acting, I'm a bit of a commitment-phobe."

Ryan and Grey's Anatomy star Kevin McKidd starred in a one-off drama for BBC Scotland, One Night In Emergency, the story of one man's surreal search for his wife in an inner-city hospital. The film, which was filmed in and around Glasgow, was written by Gregory Burke, and directed by Michael Offer.

Also in 2009, Ryan filmed 4.3.2.1., a crime thriller starring Emma Roberts, Noel Clarke, Tamsin Egerton and Ophelia Lovibond.

She starred in a stage production of The Talented Mr. Ripley at the Royal Theatre in Northampton until 9 October 2010.

In October 2010, she completed filming the terrorist thriller Cleanskin. That same year, she appeared in the comedy film Huge alongside Noel Clarke, Johnny Harris, Ralph Brown, Thandiwe Newton, and Tamsin Egerton, directed by Ben Miller. Another film, No Ordinary Trifle, is in post-production. Also in 2011, Ryan played Helena from A Midsummer Night's Dream in the BBC Learning project Off By Heart Shakespeare.

=== 2012–present: Cockneys vs Zombies, Cabaret and EastEnders return ===
Ryan also appeared in Cockneys vs Zombies, a comedy horror film about a team of bank robbers fighting the undead, directed by Matthias Hoene, alongside Georgia King, Rasmus Hardiker and Jack Doolan. The film was released in September 2012.

For the final months of 2012, Ryan toured with Will Young in a production of Cabaret. This production also played in London's West End.

In 2018, Ryan began reprising her Doctor Who role as Lady Christina in her own Big Finish Productions spinoff audio drama series.

Despite several offers to return to EastEnders, Ryan had repeatedly turned them down over the previous twenty years. However, in May 2025, it was announced that Ryan would reprise her role as Zoe Slater later in the year, under executive producer Ben Wadey. She made an unannounced return in the episode broadcast on 16 June 2025. A year later, it was announced that Ryan would be departing the role once again, with Zoe being killed off in scenes broadcast in September 2026.

== Other activities ==
Ryan is a patron of the children's cancer charity Young Lives vs Cancer (formerly CLIC Sargent). She is also active in The Big Cat Sanctuary, a registered animal sanctuary in Kent dedicated to global conservation, as well as The Total Green School Awards, which promotes environmental education in schools and rewards outstanding student projects.

== Filmography ==
=== Film ===
Year	Title	Role	Notes
2006	Cashback	Suzy	
2007	I Want Candy	Lila	
2008	Flick	Sandra Martin	
2010	4.3.2.1.	Kelly	
2010	Huge	Cindy	
2011	Cleanskin	Emma	
2011	Love's Kitchen	Shauna	
2011	Girl Walks into a Bar	Loretta	
2012	Cockneys vs Zombies	Katy MacGuire	
2012	The Man Inside	Alexia Sinclair	
2015	Andron	Elanor	
2017	The Last Photograph	Maryam	
2019	Somnium	Joan Kepler	Short film
2023	Frankenstein: Legacy	Lady Charlotte	Supporting Role
2025	Finding My Voice	Lisa Kendall	Lead Role

=== Television ===
Year	Title	Role	Notes
2000	The Worst Witch	Dolores	Episode: "Fair Is Foul & Fouls Are Fair"
2000	Burnside	School friend	2 episodes
2000–2005, 2025–2026	EastEnders	Zoe Slater	Series regular; 667 episodes
2003	EastEnders: Slaters in Detention	Zoe Slater	EastEnders Spin-Off
2003	Comic Relief 2003: The Big Hair Do	Zoe Slater	Special
2006	Agatha Christie's Marple	Rose Waters	Episode: "By the Pricking of My Thumbs"
2007	Comic Relief 2007: The Big One	Kate	Segment: "Mr. Bean's Wedding"
2007	Mansfield Park	Maria Bertram	Television film
2007	Jekyll	Katherine Reimer	6 episodes
2007	Bionic Woman	Jaime Sommers	8 episodes
2008	Merlin	Nimueh	4 episodes
2009	Doctor Who	Lady Christina de Souza	Episode: "Planet of the Dead"
2009	Mr Eleven	Saz Paley	2-part miniseries
2013	Covert Affairs	Helen Hanson / Teresa Hamilton	5 episodes in season 4
2014	Death in Paradise	Lexi Cunningham	Episode 3.2
2018	True Horror	Vanessa Mitchell	Episode: "The Witches' Prison"
2019–2020	Dark Stories	Carrie	2 episodes

=== Audio ===
Year	Title	Role	Notes	Ref.
2017	Alien: River of Pain	Lieutenant Julisa Paris		
2017, 2021	Lady Christina	Lady Christina De Souza	Volume One (2017); Volume Two (2021)	
2018	Doctor Who: The Tenth Doctor Chronicles	Lady Christina De Souza	Episode: "Last Chance"	
2022	The Eighth of March	Lady Christina De Souza	Episode: "Prism"	
2023	Once and Future	Lady Christina De Souza	Episode: "Two's Company"	

== Theatre ==
Year	Title	Role	Theatre
2005	Who’s the Daddy?	Tiffany	Kings Head Theatre, London
2010	The Talented Mr. Ripley	Marge/Sophie	Royal & Derngate, Northampton
2012	Cabaret	Sally Bowles	Savoy Theatre, London & UK Tour

== Awards and nominations ==
Year	Award	Category	Result	Ref.
2005	The British Soap Awards	Best Actress	Nominated	
