= Lily Slater =

Fictional character from EastEnders

- EastEnders character
- Lillia Turner as Lily Slater (2023)
- Portrayed by: Alfie Duncan (2010); Poppy Crake (2010); Kennady Lacy-Breckenridge (2010); Aine Garvey (2014–2019); Lillia Turner (2020–present)
- Duration: 2010, 2014–present
- First appearance: Episode 4023; 23 June 2010
- Created by: Simon Ashdown
- Introduced by: Bryan Kirkwood (2010); Dominic Treadwell-Collins (2014)
- Aine Garvey as Lily Slater (2018)
In-universe information
- Other names: Lily Branning; Lily Fowler
- Occupation: Student
- Family: Slater
- Father: Ryan Malloy
- Mother: Stacey Slater
- Adoptive father: Martin Fowler
- Stepmother: Janine Butcher; Eve Unwin; Helen Malloy
- Half-brothers: Arthur Fowler Jnr; Roman Fowler (adoptive)
- Half-sisters: Hope Fowler; Bex Fowler (adoptive)
- Daughters: Charli Slater
- Grandfathers: Brian Slater
- Grandmothers: Jean Slater; Debra Dean
- Uncles: Sean Slater; Kyle Slater
- Aunts: Whitney Dean
- First cousins: Dolly Dean-Hudson
- Other relatives: Charlie Slater; Kat Slater; Belinda Peacock; Zoe Slater; Hayley Slater; Freddie Slater; Tommy Moon; Bert Moon; Ernie Moon; Jasmine Fisher; Josh Goodwin

Lily Slater (also Branning and Fowler) is a fictional character in the BBC soap opera EastEnders and is played by Lillia Turner. Lily's first appearance in the serial is in episode 4023, originally broadcast on 23 June 2010, in which her birth is depicted. Lily is the daughter of Stacey Slater (Lacey Turner) and Ryan Malloy (Neil McDermott). Stacey and Lily both departed on 25 December 2010 at the conclusion of the "Who Killed Archie?" storyline. On 6 December 2013, it was announced that Lacey Turner would return to the soap to reprise her role as Stacey, and would begin filming in January 2014 – thus meaning Lily would be re-introduced into the serial. Lily temporarily departed the serial on 2 August 2019 once again after Stacey attacks Phil Mitchell (Steve McFadden) in a panic to save Martin Fowler (James Bye). Lily along with her family returns in episode 6133, originally broadcast on 21 September 2020, two weeks after the soap's return to transmission – this time with Turner in the role. Lily's most high-profile storyline was in 2023 when she became pregnant at just 12 years old after sleeping with her close friend and neighbour, Ricky Branning (Frankie Day). She gave birth in the episode broadcast on 5 September 2023 to their daughter, Charli Slater. On 22 May 2025, Lily temporarily departed the show, due to Turner's real life GCSE commitments. She returned on 25 August 2025.

== Development ==
=== Casting ===
In her 2010 stint, Lily was played by three child actors: Alfie Duncan, Poppy Crake and Kennady Lacy-Breckenridge. Lacey Turner left the series in late 2010 and Lily was written out of the show, making her departure on 25 December 2010. When Turner decided to return to EastEnders in 2014, producers decided to reintroduce Lily. She returned permanently on 7 February 2014. Aine Garvey took over the role and portrayed the character until 2019. Lily was absent on-screen from August 2019 to September 2020, as part of Turner's maternity leave. The character of Lily returned with the role having been recast to Lillia Turner, who had previously appeared in EastEnders in 2019 as Bailey Baker's (Kara-Leah Fernandes) friend Alyssa. Lily started appearing on a more regular basis from this point on, and was given a teenage pregnancy storyline.

=== Teenage pregnancy storyline ===
In the 2023 new years episode celebrations, it was revealed the character was pregnant and is going to be put at the forefront of an issue-led teenage pregnancy storyline devised to spread awareness on the rising issue. The storyline was not announced beforehand – which led to viewers only learning of the storyline in the episode. The storyline also faced critical acclaim for the storyline as Lily was only 12 when she first learned of her pregnancy. The father was not initially revealed until the episode broadcast on 4 January 2023 when Stacey confronts Lily. Lily reveals the father as Ricky Mitchell (Frankie Day). This prompted writers to re-introduce Lily's biological father Ryan Malloy (Neil McDermott) into the serial and he returned on screen on 13 February 2023. Whitney Dean (Shona McGarty) calls Ryan when she hears the news of Lily's pregnancy. Ryan's plan was to obtain Lily and return to Wakefield with her as he believed him and his off-screen wife Helen would be able to give Lily a better life then Stacey would. When Stacey learns of Ryan's plans, a heated confrontation is heard by Lily and Lily demands Ryan out of the house. Due to the rejection from his daughter, Ryan then makes the Slaters' financial situation worse by cutting Stacey's child support to the minimum; once again departing on 16 February. Lily decides to have a gender reveal party. The party ends up in disaster when the cake that was supposed to reveal the gender was green rather than pink. She later announces to Stacey she is having a girl, much to Stacey's excitement. The scenes faced backlash. Much speculation was thrown into the storyline and it was heavily presumed Lily would let her on-screen aunt Whitney raise her child instead: this turned out later to be untrue as McGarty was exiting the soap opera in 2024. Viewers also noted a strong resemblance between Lily and on-screen family member Kat Slater (Jessie Wallace) who also had her own experience in teenage pregnancy – Kat also guides Lily along her pregnancy as the family are also suffering with the cost of living crisis. Stacey later begins an OnlyFans type website to bring in money for the family; leaving Lily embarrassed when students at her school find out.

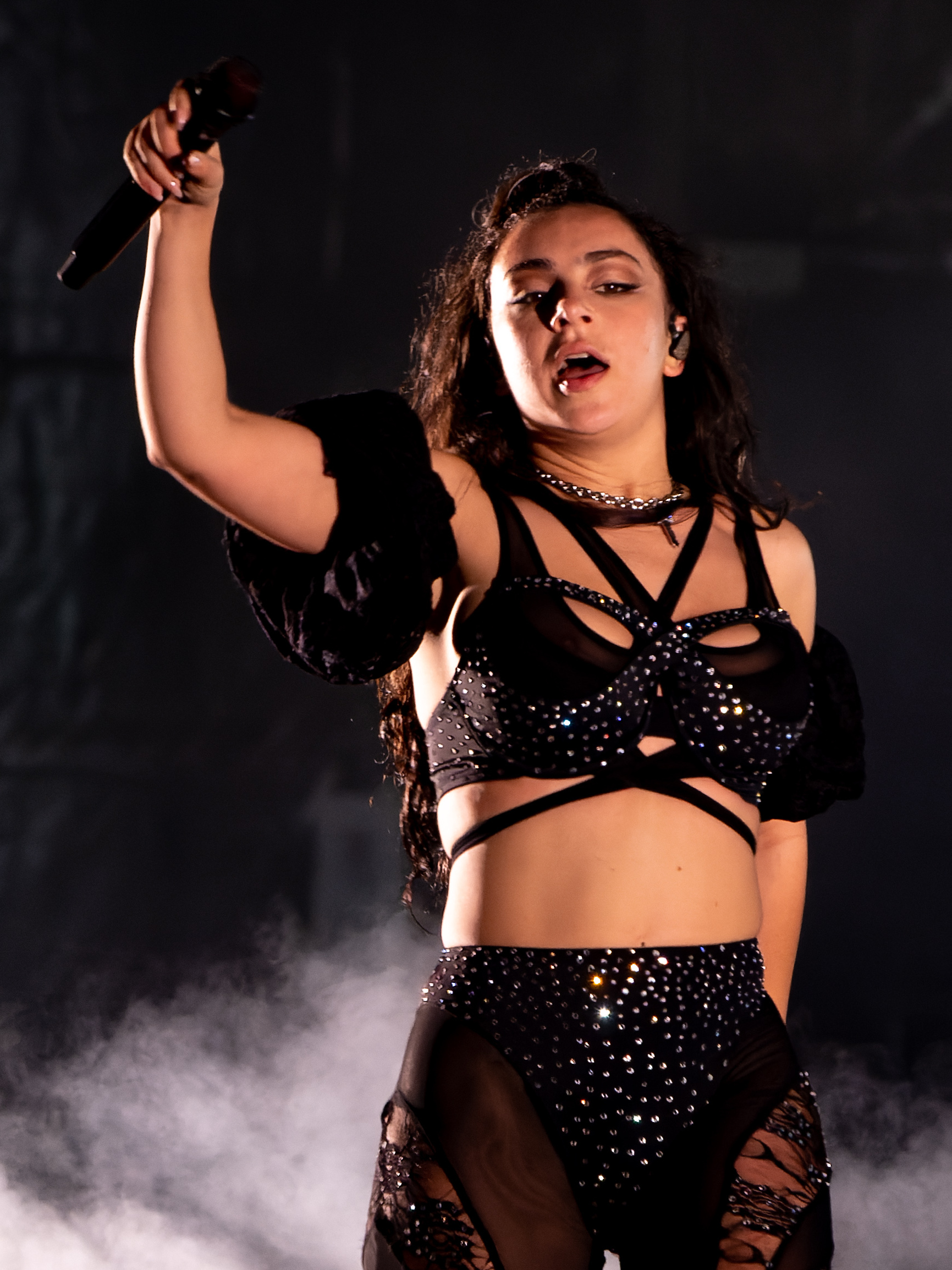
Charli is named after singer Charli XCX.

Lily gives birth to baby Charli Slater in the episode originally broadcast on 5 September 2023. Lily falls into labour whilst her former tutor and Stacey's stalker Theo Hawthorne (William Ellis) is in the home and tormenting Stacey – moments after confessing to stalking her and the family for months. Writers named the character after the singer Charli XCX, who tweeted about the reference with the caption, "Shout out to my gays [sic] in the writers room!". In the event of their daughter being born, Ricky changes his surname from Mitchell to Branning. Viewers see Lily initially struggling with motherhood. As Lily is going through a tough time as a new mum, she is easily wound up, with Whitney picking at her parenting and at one point making a comment about her daughter being alive whereas Whitney's had just died. Lily was pushed to her breaking point and shouted at Charli for crying.

== Storylines ==
=== 2010 ===
Lily is conceived in September 2009 when Stacey stops taking medication for her bipolar disorder, causing her to act irrationally and sleep with numerous men, including Ryan. Around the same time, she is raped by Archie Mitchell (Larry Lamb) and after trying to tell her former husband Bradley Branning (Charlie Clements), she is sectioned under the Mental Health Act. Upon Stacey's return to Walford in December 2009, she and Bradley reconcile, and she tells him that she is pregnant. He is overjoyed, thinking the baby is his, until she says that she is three months pregnant, and the baby cannot be Bradley's.

After admitting that Archie raped her, Bradley vows to raise the baby as his own, but after Bradley dies in February 2010, Archie's daughter Ronnie Mitchell (Samantha Womack) tells Stacey that Archie was sterile, due to cancer treatment, making Stacey realise the baby's father is Ryan, as he is the only other person it could be. However, Stacey does not tell Ryan, and in June 2010, she goes into labour alone; however, Ryan finds her and takes her to the hospital. During labour, the baby is starved of oxygen, but is born healthy, and is named Lily when they come home. Stacey refuses to take Lily out of the house, and panics when her mother Jean Slater (Gillian Wright) does so without her knowing. However, Bradley's father Max Branning (Jake Wood) soon convinces Stacey to take Lily outside. In September 2010, during a fire at The Queen Victoria public house (see Queen Vic Fire Week), Stacey and Lily are trapped upstairs and are rescued by Ryan, who has just married Janine Butcher (Charlie Brooks). Shortly afterwards, Stacey tells Ryan that he is Lily's father. The next day, Ryan declines an offer to hold Lily, and walks away. After Ryan and Janine's honeymoon, Janine discovers that Ryan is Lily's father, and is angry about it. She phones social services to report Stacey for neglecting Lily, but the social worker, Maria de Costa (Judy Browne), can see that Lily is fine, and notes that the allegation was false.

When Stacey and Janine are arrested while fighting on a night out in October 2010, Ryan looks after Lily, and after Stacey and Janine are released, vows to be a part of Lily's life. Stacey has Ryan's name added to Lily's birth certificate, but Ryan lies to Janine about where he has been all afternoon, and Janine does not tell him that she knows. She decides to kidnap Lily and go to France to get Stacey out of their lives. However, when Ryan finds Lily in the car, he orders Janine to stop. She stops on a level crossing with a train approaching, and is unable to restart the car. Ryan gets Lily out, but Janine cannot open her door. She then starts the engine just in time for the train to miss hitting her car.

Ryan insists they return Lily to her mother in Walford. Stacey has already called the police, but Janine tells her that she heard Lily crying upstairs, and took her to look after her; Ryan backs up Janine's story. When Ryan tells Janine he is leaving her to be with Stacey and Lily, Janine publicly announces to everyone in The Queen Vic that Stacey killed Archie. On Christmas Day 2010, Janine, knowing she has no hard evidence to get Stacey convicted, stabs herself to frame Stacey for attempted murder, causing Stacey and Lily to flee the country for Mexico, just as the police arrive. Ryan wants to come with them, but Stacey rejects him, leaving him devastated.

=== 2014–present ===
Lily (now played by Aine Garvey) returns in February 2014, when she answers the door to Stacey's cousin Kat Moon (Jessie Wallace), after Kat tracks them both down to a flat in London. Lily gets on well with Stacey's new boyfriend Luke Riley (Matt Willis), although he thinks that Stacey's real name is "Jenny Smith", and he does not know that she is actually on the run from the police. Kat lets slip Stacey's true identity to Luke, who throws both Stacey and Lily out of the house. Kat and Stacey visit Janine in prison to try persuading her to drop the false allegations she made against Stacey three years ago so that she can return home to her family. After spending a week back in Albert Square, Stacey and Lily leave to spend time with Jean in Brighton. After Stacey confesses to Archie's murder and is sentenced to five years imprisonment, Lily is sent to live with Jean and her boyfriend Ollie Walters (Tony O'Callaghan). She returns to the square with Jean in August 2014, and eventually stays with Kat and her husband Alfie Moon (Shane Richie) when Jean returns to Brighton.

When Stacey's conviction is quashed on a technicality, she returns to the square early; Lily refuses to spend time with her, and seems to be close to her father, Ryan's half-sister, Whitney Dean (Shona McGarty). Stacey and Lily eventually reunite. When Lily asks about Ryan, Stacey confronts Whitney about her telling Lily about Ryan without Stacey's consent. Stacey bans Whitney from seeing Lily, but later reconsiders when she realises how much Lily means to Whitney.

After Stacey allows Martin Fowler (James Bye) to move in with her and Lily in May 2015, they begin dating, and Martin becomes a father figure to Lily. When Stacey is sectioned at hospital after suffering from postpartum psychosis in January 2016, following the birth of her son Arthur Fowler on Christmas Eve 2015, Whitney contacts Ryan, who arrives at The Queen Vic, where Whitney is looking after Lily, and assures a sleeping Lily that he will be there for her. The next day, Ryan is determined to be a proper father in Lily's life; however, Whitney desperately tries to persuade him not to tell her.

Whitney later takes Lily to the park to meet Ryan, where Lily states that Ryan is not her father, but he reveals the truth to her. He then arrives at Stacey's house and tells Martin that he is taking Lily away. After being talked down by Martin and Whitney, Ryan hands Lily back over to Martin, devastating him and he promises Lily that he will return to see her again. Lily struggles to come to terms with Stacey being in hospital, but Martin's daughter, Bex Fowler (Jasmine Armfield), helps explain things to Lily. Lily is delighted when Stacey comes home after spending time in a mother and baby unit with Arthur. Stacey and Martin marry in May 2016 and Lily takes Martin's surname. Bex moves in with Stacey and Martin, and the family move into a bigger house in September 2016.

In June 2017, Lily finds out that Stacey and Martin are having a baby, and she lets it slip to Arthur's father Kush Kazemi (Davood Ghadami) and his mother Carmel (Bonnie Langford). After Stacey misses Lily's dance show in September 2017, she tells Lily that Arthur may have inherited Brugada syndrome from Kush. Stacey is annoyed with Whitney when she takes Lily and Arthur for breakfast and Lily is fed up of being ignored by an exhausted Stacey. When Lily refuses to eat her tea, Stacey physically takes Lily to go upstairs in the presence of Carmel, who refuses to leave Stacey with Lily and Arthur. In October 2017, Carmel notices bruises on Arthur's arms, and Lily tells Carmel that Stacey was responsible, despite him actually injuring himself at hospital. Carmel reports it to social services, but tries to retract what she said after realising it was a mistake. Social services visit Stacey and Martin, and tell them they received a report about Arthur. Lily and Arthur are placed in Carmel's care until social services have investigated. Arthur is looked over by a doctor, who has no concerns; thus, Stacey and Martin can have Lily and Arthur back. Social worker Fiona Payne (Sandra James-Young) tells Stacey and Martin she will be conducting further home visits. Lily tells Stacey and Martin that she injured Arthur. After speaking with Lily, the social worker tells Stacey and Martin that Lily feels pushed out with Arthur and is anxious about their baby.

Carmel and Kush admit Carmel called social services, enraging Stacey. When Stacey cheats on Martin with Max, Stacey leaves Walford with Lily, Arthur and her and Martin's daughter, Hope Fowler, in December 2017. Stacey returns in January 2018, and when Stacey is out, Martin accuses her of being with Max, so Stacey decides Martin should leave; he is hurt Stacey does not regard Lily and Arthur as his children, but he angrily throws her out and exposes her affair. Martin keeps Lily, Arthur and Hope inside, away from Stacey, though he and Stacey support each other briefly when Lily holds Hope by the upstairs window, asking for Stacey. Martin rejects Stacey when she says that Lily, Arthur and Hope need her, and he decides he will not let Stacey near Lily, Arthur and Hope. Martin decides to go for custody, although his friends advise them to resolve their problems; he sees Stacey, offering her contact, but Stacey contacts Ryan to help her, and a locksmith changes the locks, devastating Martin. Lily later leaves with Stacey and Martin. However, Martin returns when Bex attempts suicide. Stacey and Martin later separate because of him being blackmailed, and it is revealed that Stacey is living with another man, but has broken up with him.

In September 2020, Lily (now played by Lillia Turner) returns with Stacey and Hope, after it is revealed that Stacey had been pretending to be Ruby Allen (Louisa Lytton) by buying things using her identity, as revenge for Ruby's affair with Martin in Stacey's absence. Lily, Stacey and Hope soon move back in with Kat, Jean and Kat's grandmother, Mo Harris (Laila Morse). A week later, Martin marries Ruby without informing the children, and the next week there is a confrontation: Lily hears Stacey mocking Ruby, and even going for a night out, not knowing that their mother was assaulted after she got angry. In February 2021, Martin and Ruby want to take the children on holiday, initially to the South Emirates. Stacey is angry that the children do not have a say, and she asks Ruby to buy nail vanish to see if Stacey would go on holiday. However, a confrontation occurs the following day, and Ruby falls down the stairs. Everyone blames Stacey, including Martin, who Ruby manipulated into believing. Jean and Lily know she is innocent, and Lily tries to find a way to stop her mother going to prison to prove a point. However, Ruby continues with the claim; Lily and her siblings are upset with their mother being locked up, and Lily decides to trick Martin and Ruby into letting them stay with them for a while. Despite this, many problems occur, including Lily been caught with drugs at school and nearly getting sent to prison, along with her siblings. She then returns to being with Stacey and Jean, but has to stay with Whitney for a while. In July 2022, Lily tracks down Kat's estranged daughter, Zoe Slater (Michelle Ryan), on social media and invites her to Kat's wedding to Phil Mitchell (Steve McFadden). Lily also notices that Zoe is in London, and arranges for her to meet with Kat at Peggy's wine bar that evening; however, Zoe ignores her message, and does not turn up. Kat tells Lily that when Zoe is ready to make amends, she will be there: likewise, with her sisters, Lynne (Elaine Lordan), Belinda (Leanne Lakey/Carli Norris) and Little Mo (Kacey Ainsworth).

In January 2023, Lily, Jean and Stacey's wife Eve Unwin (Heather Peace) are all hospitalised with carbon monoxide poisoning following a house party. A doctor later informs Stacey that Lily has fallen pregnant at twelve years of age, and she names Ricky Mitchell (Frankie Day) as the father, following a one-night stand. Lily announces to Stacey and Martin that she has decided to terminate the pregnancy, as she is not ready to have a baby. However, she later changes her mind, following a heart-to-heart with Kat. Lily then tells Ricky, who confides in his mother Sam Mitchell (Kim Medcalf), who then informs Ricky's father Jack Branning (Scott Maslen). Ricky later tells Lily that he will support her and the baby. Upon Sam and Jack processing the news, they pay a visit to the Slaters, and berate Stacey and Martin for their refusal to have Lily's pregnancy terminated. Stacey tells them that it is Lily's choice. Sam tells Stacey that they have rights over the decision too. Jack then tries to manipulate Lily into changing her mind, by scaring her about the prospects of young parenthood. Lily tells Stacey, resulting in Stacey furiously banning the Brannings and Mitchells from having anything to do with Lily's baby.

Ryan returns to Walford after six years away, demanding answers over Lily's pregnancy, which he learned from Whitney via a phone call. Stacey explains that she was going to tell him when the time was right. Ryan then offers his financial support to both Lily and the baby. It is later revealed that Ryan has been conspiring with his wife Helen to fight Stacey in court for custody of Lily, so she and the baby can live with Ryan and Helen in Wakefield, as they are unable to have children of their own. Sam calls round to the Slaters, and invites herself to Lily's first baby scan. Lily informs Stacey that she has invited Ricky and Ryan along too. Stacey, Ryan, Sam and Ricky all accompany Lily to her scan. Ryan then approaches Stacey with the idea of Lily living with him and Helen, but she laughs it off, resulting in an argument between them in the hospital. The midwife asks them both to step out of the room, resulting in Lily being left alone with Sam and Ricky. Ryan later goes behind Stacey's back and asks Lily if she would like to live with him in Wakefield. Lily later agrees, and they both tell Stacey back at the Slater house. Whilst Lily is out of the room, Stacey and Ryan have another argument, and Lily overhears Ryan criticising Stacey's parenting by calling her a "bad mother". Lily then orders Ryan to leave Walford, which he does, but not before exchanging some harsh words with Stacey, Kat and Whitney. Lily later has a gender reveal party and announces she is pregnant with a baby girl. Following the birth of their daughter, Lily and Ricky decide to name her Charli Slater, after singer Charli XCX, an overjoyed Stacey and Kat initially assume the name is in honour of the late Charlie Slater (Derek Martin). When Charli is a week old, Lily persuades Stacey to leave her to care for her daughter while she works and Stacey reluctantly agrees. Eve suggests for Ricky to go and see Lily and Charli on his lunch break. Ricky visits Lily and his daughter and tells her that their friends want to see Charli and Lily reluctantly takes her to see their friends in the park. Lily and Ricky are caught by Jack trying to feed Charli crisps as part of a prank and he takes Charli to Stacey, telling her what happened. Stacey no longer trusts Lily and starts taking over caring for Charli, which upsets Lily and she confides in Jean about how she feels left out of her daughter's life. Jean tells Stacey that she needs to back off and help Lily be a mother, rather than do everything for her or Lily worries that Charli will grow up and see Stacey as her mum. Stacey accepts that she has been interfering too much and assures Lily that if she needs help, to ask her for it. Lily finally bonds with her daughter, but over the next month, she struggles to calm her daughter down at a family meal at the Mitchells' house. She screams at Charli and tells her to shut up, which infuriates Jean and Martin. She locks herself in the kitchen and cries about how she feels she is not being a good enough mum. She tells Kat that she is considering putting Charli up for adoption as reality hits her that a full time job as a teenage mother is hard. Kat shares with Lily her own experience with Zoe and how she felt pushed out when she couldn't be the mother she wanted to be, because her family insisted on bringing Zoe up to be Kat's sister. She tells Lily that she has a choice and to make sure she makes the right one as she could regret choosing adoption for the rest of her life. She also reminds Lily that the family are always there to help her if things get too much.

As the next few months go by, Lily goes back to school for the first time since her pregnancy and is worried about leaving Charli for the first time. Stacey tells her that she will be fine and Lily leaves for school. She is rarely seen in the first months of the New Year, but is present when she discovers that Stacey has been having an affair with Jack behind his wife, Denise Fox's (Diane Parish) back. Lily is disgusted with Stacey and stays with Martin for the night, taking Charli with her. The next day she comes home briefly to get nappies and Stacey tries to talk her into coming home but Lily does not want herself or even Charli near her. After a few weeks and things calm down, Lily eventually moves back home to live with Stacey. At the end of the summer, Charli's life is in danger when she is left in a boiling hot car under the care of Harvey Monroe (Ross Boatman), who is sleep deprived from late night shifts with the taxiing. Charli is taken to hospital and her temperature goes down after being given cold compresses and flannels. Lily is told if she had been in there for another ten minutes, she could have died. She blames Harvey for her daughter's near death experience. A few days later, Lily arranges an early birthday party for Charli as it is her first birthday the next day. She is disappointed with Stacey for putting her presence at the trial of Dean Wicks (Matt Di Angelo) before her and Charli. Feeling bad after a long and difficult day, Stacey gives Lily a baby book filled with photos of Charli's first year of life and she assures her daughter that she does care about her family. Lily gives her the benefit of the doubt and accepts Stacey's apology for not being at the party. As part of EastEnders' 40th anniversary, The Queen Vic explodes, and Jean and Lily are rescued by Martin, who stays to help Stacey try and escape. Stacey shares her admiration of Martin, who initially declines, saying he is in a committed relationship with Ruby. He eventually admits he wants to be with Stacey and has always loved her before he succumbs to his injuries after being crushed by a fallen beam and dies.

Following Martin's death, a grieving Lily becomes more angry, especially when Stacey goes to stay with her brother Sean (Robert Kazinsky) for several weeks, leaving the children with Jean while she mourns Martin. Lily starts getting into trouble, such as a drugs arrest. When Stacey locks herself in her room due to the grief, Lily takes care of her siblings - which is proven to be too much for her. Following this, her and Avani Nandra-Hart (Aaliyah James) start to smoke weed and drink together. Eventually after several disagreements with Stacey, Lily goes to stay with Ryan temporarily and takes Charli with her. When she returns, Stacey announces that she wants to move to Brazil to live with Sean and take her children with her, but Lily declines the offer, not wanting to separate Charli from Ricky, and stays in Walford with Jean. Lily later struggles to support Jean through another bipolar episode, in which Jean develops a vendetta against Zoe, blaming her for Stacey leaving, and later Zoe's daughter Jasmine (Indeyarna Donaldson-Holness). Lily temporarily moves in with Kat and her family at the Vic when Jean goes to stay with their relative Lynne Slater (Elaine Lordan). Jean returns home a few weeks later, having recovered, and Lily moves back home.

Lily becomes involved in her best friends Avani and Amy Mitchell's (Ellie Dadd) conflict with Joel Marshall (Max Murray), who has recently been released from juvenile detention for posting a sexual video of Avani without her consent, and for violently assaulting his stepmother, Vicki Fowler (Alice Haig). Lily takes pity on Joel, who has been ostracised, but later gets involved in a prank by her friend group, consisting of Amy, Avani, Ricky, Denzel Danes (Jaden Ladega), Davinder "Nugget" Gulati (Juhaim Rasul Choudhury), Barney Mitchell (Lewis Bridgeman), and Will Mitchell (Freddie Phillips), to humiliate Joel by tying him up and throwing beer over him. Later that night, Joel is attacked and left for dead by an unknown assailant, and all of the teens, including Lily, become suspects. Lily admits to Jean that she filmed the prank, causing the video to be sent to several of the teens' parents, including Joel's father Ross (Alex Walkinshaw). Lily later apologises to Joel and the two form a friendship.

== Reception ==
Turner faced mixed reception towards her pregnancy storyline. For her portrayal of Lily, she won the award for Best Young Performer at the 2023 British Soap Awards. Later that year, she was nominated in the same category at the Inside Soap Awards and was longlisted for the award for Serial Drama Performance at the 28th National Television Awards. She was also longlisted for "Best Young Performer" at the 2025 Inside Soap Awards. Turner is also numerously mistaken to be related to the actress Lacey who plays her on-screen mother.
