= Slater family (EastEnders) =

Fictional family from EastEnders

- EastEnders family
- The original Slater family as they appeared in 2000
- First appearance: Episode 1997; 4 September 2000
- Created by: Tony Jordan; John Yorke
- Introduced by: John Yorke
- Duration: 2000−present
- Spin-offs: Slaters in Detention (2003); Pat and Mo (2004); Kat & Alfie: Redwater (2017); EastEnders: The Podcast (2018); The Point of Mo Return (2024)

The Slater family are a fictional family from the BBC soap opera EastEnders, that have appeared since Episode 1997, first broadcast in September 2000. The family are introduced as a central family unit, originally consisting of father Charlie Slater (Derek Martin), grandmother Mo Harris (Laila Morse), Charlie's daughters, Kat Slater (Jessie Wallace), Lynne Slater (Elaine Lordan), Little Mo Morgan (Kacey Ainsworth) and Kat's teenage daughter Zoe Slater (Michelle Ryan), and Lynne's partner Garry Hobbs (Ricky Groves). A fifth sister, Belinda Peacock (Leanne Lakey), was introduced one year later. The family were the eighth to be introduced in the soap's history, replacing the di Marco family who departed during the previous month. The Slaters were created by Tony Jordan and introduced by John Yorke. The Slater sisters were cast in an improvisation session. In their first years on the show, the family were involved in storylines about child sexual abuse and domestic violence.

Following multiple cast departures, three new cast members – Lacey Turner (Stacey Slater), Gillian Wright (Jean Slater) and Robert Kazinsky (Sean Slater) – joined the show as an extension of the family. Stacey and her mother, Jean were used to highlight the topic of bipolar disorder, working with the charity Mind. In 2010, Wallace reprised her role and Turner left the series. The following year, Kat featured in a controversial story which sees her newborn son swapped for a deceased baby. Turner returned in 2014 and the Slater family were later expanded. Riley Carter Millington, the first transgender actor to portray a transgender character in a British soap opera, was cast as Stacey's half-brother, Kyle Slater. Former Coronation Street actress, Denise Welch, appeared in one episode as Kyle's mother, Alison Slater.

The family became a focal point across New Year 2016 when Kat discovers that she has a secret son and Charlie is killed-off. The events are followed by a spin-off drama, Kat & Alfie: Redwater, focusing on Kat's search for her son in Ireland, who is revealed to be murderous Catholic priest Dermott Dolan (Oisín Stack). 2016 also sees Stacey begin suffering from postpartum psychosis, a rare mental illness associated with bipolar mothers. Prior to the storyline, the family were merged with the Fowler family following Stacey's pairing with Martin Fowler (James Bye). Following his reappointment, Yorke revived the Slater family by reintroducing Kat, Jean and Big Mo, and casting Katie Jarvis as new family member Hayley Slater. He also made the family a focal point across Christmas 2018 with a paternity reveal.

As of 2026, a total of nine blood Slaters appear on the programme: Kat Moon (Jessie Wallace); her children, Tommy Moon (Sonny Kendall), Bert Moon (Elliot Briffett) and Ernie Moon (Cody Briffett); Zoe's children, Jasmine Fisher (Indeyarna Donaldson-Holness) and Josh Goodwin (Joshua Vaughan); Sean Slater (Robert Kazinsky); Lily Slater (Lillia Turner); and her daughter Charli Slater. There are others that have married into the family, such as Kat's ex-husband Phil Mitchell (Steve McFadden) and her current husband Alfie Moon (Shane Richie), Sean and Stacey’s mother Jean Slater (Gillian Wright), and Stacey's ex-wife Eve Panesar-Unwin (Heather Peace), while Kat's grandmother and Charlie's mother-in-law, Mo Harris (Laila Morse), is also considered to be part of the family.

== Creation ==
On 30 August 2000, it was announced that a new family, the Slaters, would be introduced to EastEnders to replace the di Marco family, who departed the series during that month. The family, who first appear in September, mark the eighth to be introduced in the soap's history. Executive producer John Yorke hoped that the introduction of the family would return EastEnders to its familial roots, describing them as "the classic EastEnders family which is all about surviving and fighting back all the time." Head of BBC drama series, Mal Young, said the family were introduced as at the time, the serial had a deficit of "solid families", expanding, "there were a lot of fractured families and people who were alone."

The Slater family was created by series consultant Tony Jordan during an improvisation session with 30 actors and actresses. Prior to the workshop session, Yorke assumed he would create a more traditionally structured family, consisting of a mother, a father and two children. He was surprised to find that the presiding influence over the Slaters as they were created was a dead matriarch, Viv Slater (Debi Gibson), who exerted a "powerful influence" from beyond the grave. Yorke selected Jessie Wallace (Kat Slater), Elaine Lordan (Lynne Slater), Kacey Ainsworth (Little Mo Morgan) and Michelle Ryan (Zoe Slater) to play four of the Slater sisters as they got along so well during the improvisation session. Derek Martin was cast as patriarch Charlie Slater later than his screen daughters, in his third audition for EastEnders, having previously been considered for the roles of Den Watts and Frank Butcher. Laila Morse was chosen to portray Charlie's mother-in-law, Mo Harris. Leanne Lakey was later cast as the fifth daughter, Belinda Peacock, a recurring character introduced in 2001. Lakey enjoyed portraying Belinda on a recurring basis due to her second role on Family Affairs.

== Development ==
Upon the introduction of Charlie's brother Harry Slater (Michael Elphick) in 2001, it transpired that Zoe was actually Kat's daughter, conceived as a product of rape following her molestation by her uncle. Both Harry and Little Mo's abusive husband Trevor Morgan (Alex Ferns), introduced in December 2000, were outsiders to the core family unit, never given a permanent home on Albert Square. Yorke felt that this was an important distinction to make, as when the possibility of a child sexual abuse storyline was discussed, it was concluded that the audience would feel "betrayed" were such a revelation to be made about a long-established and well-liked character. Both characters were also easily removed from the family, with Trevor dying in a fire, and Harry exiled to Spain where he died from a heart attack.

=== Departures and introductions ===
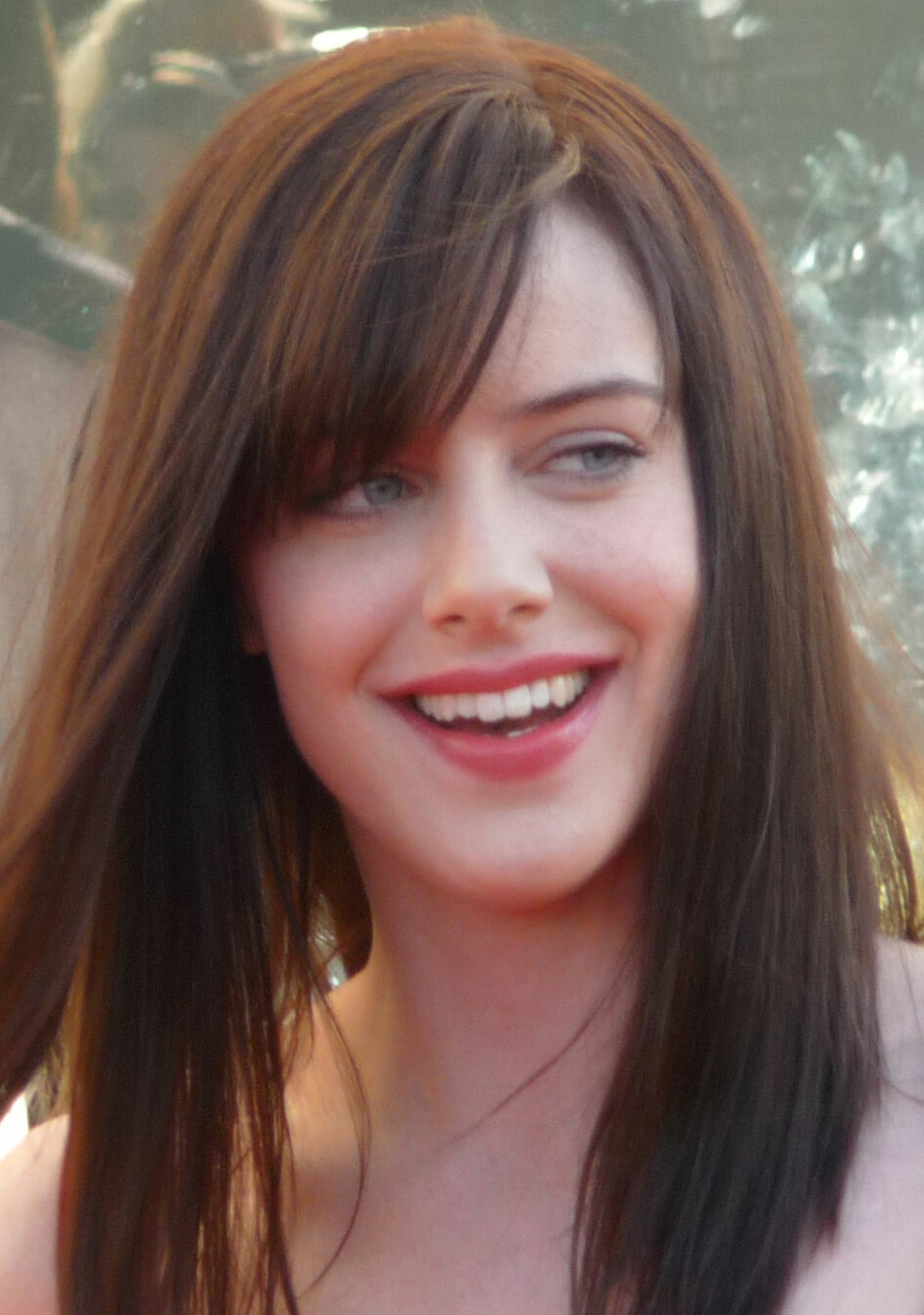
Actress Michelle Ryan (pictured in 2009) departed her role as Zoe Slater in 2005. She returned in 2025.

Between July 2004 and May 2006, each original Slater sister departed the series. Lynne became the first original Slater character to leave the series after executive producer Louise Berridge decided not to renew Lordon's contract. Lynne departs after ending her marriage to Garry. After becoming pregnant in 2004, Wallace was confirmed to be taking maternity leave from the show. Despite this plans for Kat to leave in December, the actress stopped filming in August following a pregnancy scare. After a short absence, Wallace returned to filming in January and Kat reappeared in May. Shortly afterwards, Zoe made her final appearance following Ryan's decision to leave the series. Ryan filmed her final scenes in May and Zoe departs after deciding to move to Ibiza. On 19 July 2005, it was announced that Wallace had decided to leave EastEnders. Richie had announced his intentions to leave two days previously, and the characters depart together on Christmas Day. The final Slater sister actress, Ainsworth, announced her plans to leave the show to pursue new projects in April 2006. Her character, Little Mo, departed during the following month when she moves to Barnstaple. Little Mo's son Freddie Mitchell, portrayed by twins Alex and Tom Kilby, was also written out of the series.

Following the spree of exits in the family, producers created three new additions of the family. Lacey Turner was cast as Stacey Slater, Charlie's "feisty" great-niece, who is billed as "one hell of a bitch". Turner originally auditioned for a part in the Miller family. Stacey's mother, Jean Slater (Gillian Wright), was later introduced as a minor character. Following a short stint in 2005, the character was gradually developed into a main character, a process which Wright found difficult as she struggled "to turn her from someone who was quite an intensive character to someone who could be watched on a regular basis." The topic of bipolar disorder is explored through Jean, who suffers from the condition. Wright spoke to a bipolar sufferer regularly to make her portrayal accurate. Robert Kazinsky was cast as Stacey's brother, Sean Slater, in 2006 and the character first appears in August. A show spokesperson stated that Sean would feature in "some of the biggest storylines of the year". It is revealed that Sean feels responsible for the death of his father, Brian, who died of an aneurysm the day after Sean punched him. Kazinsky continued in the role until 2009 after deciding to explore new projects.

Writers paired Stacey with Bradley Branning (Charlie Clements) in 2006 and they married during the following year. Stacey subsequently became more integrated in the Branning family unit. Stacey embarks on a "dramatic" affair with Bradley's father, Max Branning (Jake Wood). The affair is revealed to their family on Christmas Day through a DVD made by Max's daughter, Lauren Branning (Madeline Duggan), and Bradley ends their marriage. In 2009, Stacey was used to highlight the issue of bipolar disorder, a storyline which was created as part of the BBC's Headroom campaign tackling mental health awareness. By the point of Stacey being diagnosed, Jean's condition was being portrayed as a characteristic rather than a storyline. EastEnders worked with mental health charities, including Mind, to portray Stacey's bipolar disorder. Stacey is later sectioned after Bradley decides to move to Canada with his girlfriend, Syd Chambers (Nina Toussaint-White). When Bradley returns, the couple reunite. Clements enjoyed working with Turner and opined that they had good chemistry on-screen. Stacey became pregnant in 2009 and gave birth to a daughter, Lily Branning, in June 2010. Stacey and Bradley had remarried four months previously.

=== Cast exits, Kat's return and baby swap ===
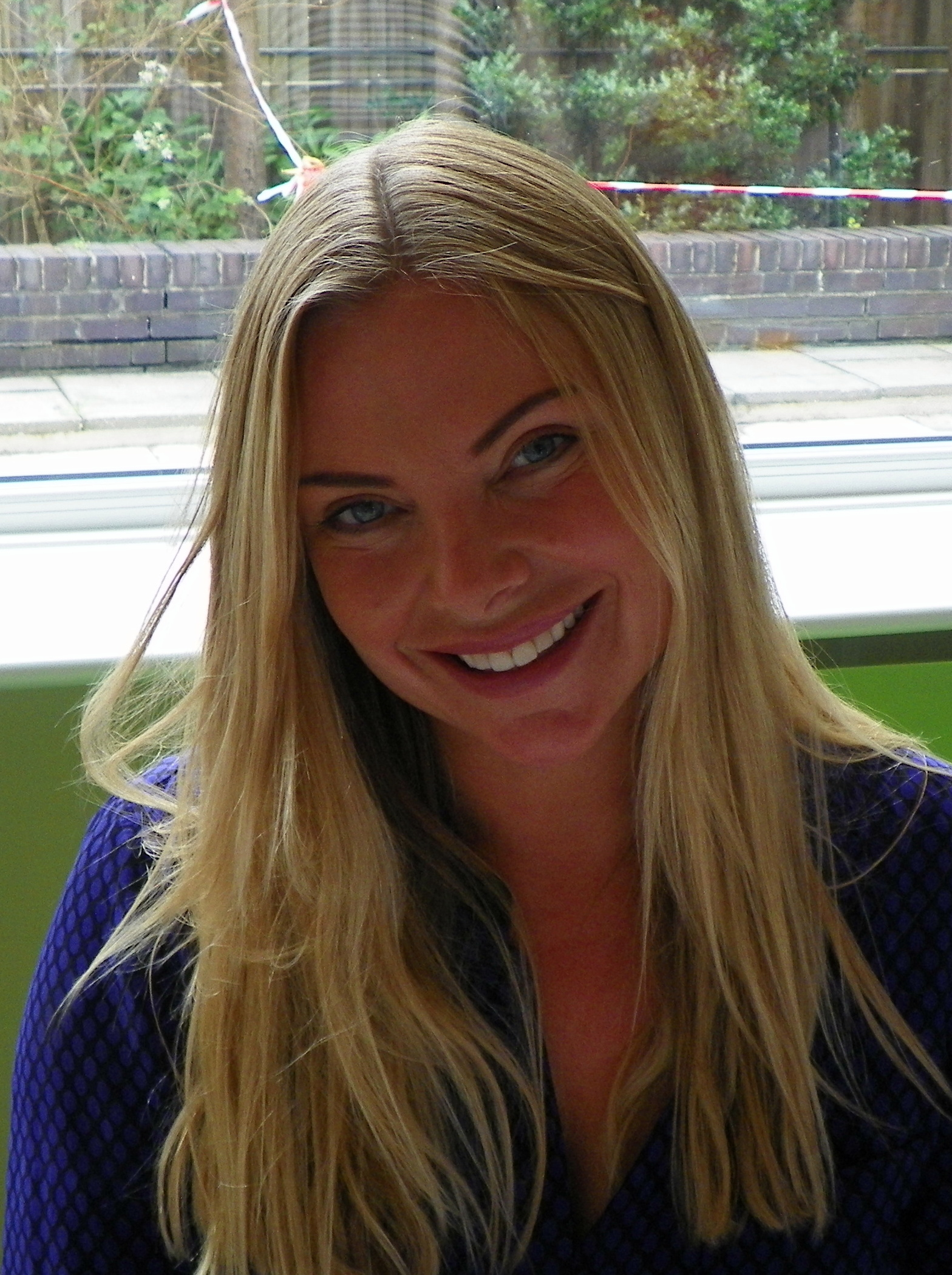
Ronnie Branning, portrayed by Samantha Womack (pictured), swapped her dead baby with Kat's son, Tommy, in late 2010.

To celebrate the soap's 25th anniversary, producers created a storyline, "Who Killed Archie?", to kill off Archie Mitchell (Larry Lamb). The story builds to a revelation in a live episode broadcast on 19 February 2010. Stacey was central to the storyline and was revealed to be Archie's killer in the live episode, which also features Bradley's death. Days later, Turner and Wood (Max Branning) feature in a two-hander episode written by series consultant and lead writer Simon Ashdown. Following his appointment in 2010, executive producer Bryan Kirkwood opted to write out multiple characters from the series, including Charlie. Kirkwood originally planned for Charlie to be killed-off when he suffers a heart attack, but after Martin spoke to Yorke, the then-head of drama, plans were changed to allow Charlie to leave alive. On 29 April 2010, it was announced that Turner and Wright would be leaving the series in "dramatic departures". At the time of her departure, Kirkwood called Turner "one of the best young actresses on TV" and wished her luck for the future. He also praised Wright, commenting, "Gillian has brought real heart and pathos to the role of Jean Slater". It was later confirmed that Wright had been handed a reprieve and Jean would return shortly after her exit. Stacey escapes to Mexico with Lily on Christmas Day 2010 after confessing to Archie's murder. Weeks later, Jean leaves after being sectioned, but she returns in March.

In February 2010, it was announced that Wallace and Richie would return to EastEnders later that year. The actors were the first cast members to be signed by Kirkwood following his appointment. It was confirmed that Kat and Alfie would become the landlord and landlady of The Queen Victoria public house, a pivotal location in the series, when it reopens following a fire. Kat and Alfie return in September 2010, where she is revealed to be pregnant. Following their return, Richie teased that the characters would feature in a 1-2 year-long storyline which he described as "the biggest soap story in probably the history of soaps". In late December 2010, Kat gives birth to a son, Tommy Moon (Shane and Ralfie White). The birth forms a new story for the family when Ronnie Branning (Samantha Womack) swaps her dead baby with Tommy. Kirkwood billed the storyline as "convincing and powerful" and "built on the rich history" of Kat and Ronnie. The Foundation for the Study of Infant Deaths praised the storyline for accurately portraying how sudden infant death syndrome (SIDS) can affect families. The plot leads to Charlie's exit in January 2011. That same month, it was confirmed that the storyline would end early due to heavy criticism. The storyline concluded in April when Kat and Alfie are reunited with Tommy. Wallace thought that it would tough for the couple, particularly Kat, following their reunion with Tommy. Following the conclusion, Martin reprised his role for two episodes. Charlie returns and fixes his relationship with Kat, as well as helping her bond with Tommy.

=== Stacey's return and secret family ===
In July 2012, Morse was told that her contract would not be renewed, however she continued to make occasional appearances in the show. On 31 July 2013, it was announced that Jean would leave EastEnders following Wright's resignation. The actress hoped to reprise the role in the future. As part of Jean's exit, Tony O'Callaghan was cast as her new love interest, Ollie Walters. The characters depart together in September 2013 after deciding to move to Brighton. Martin reprised his role as Charlie for two episodes in December 2013 and expressed an interest in returning permanently. That same month, Kat announces that she is pregnant with Alfie's child. Nine months later, Kat gives birth to their twin sons, Bert and Ernie Moon (Freddie and Stanley Beale).

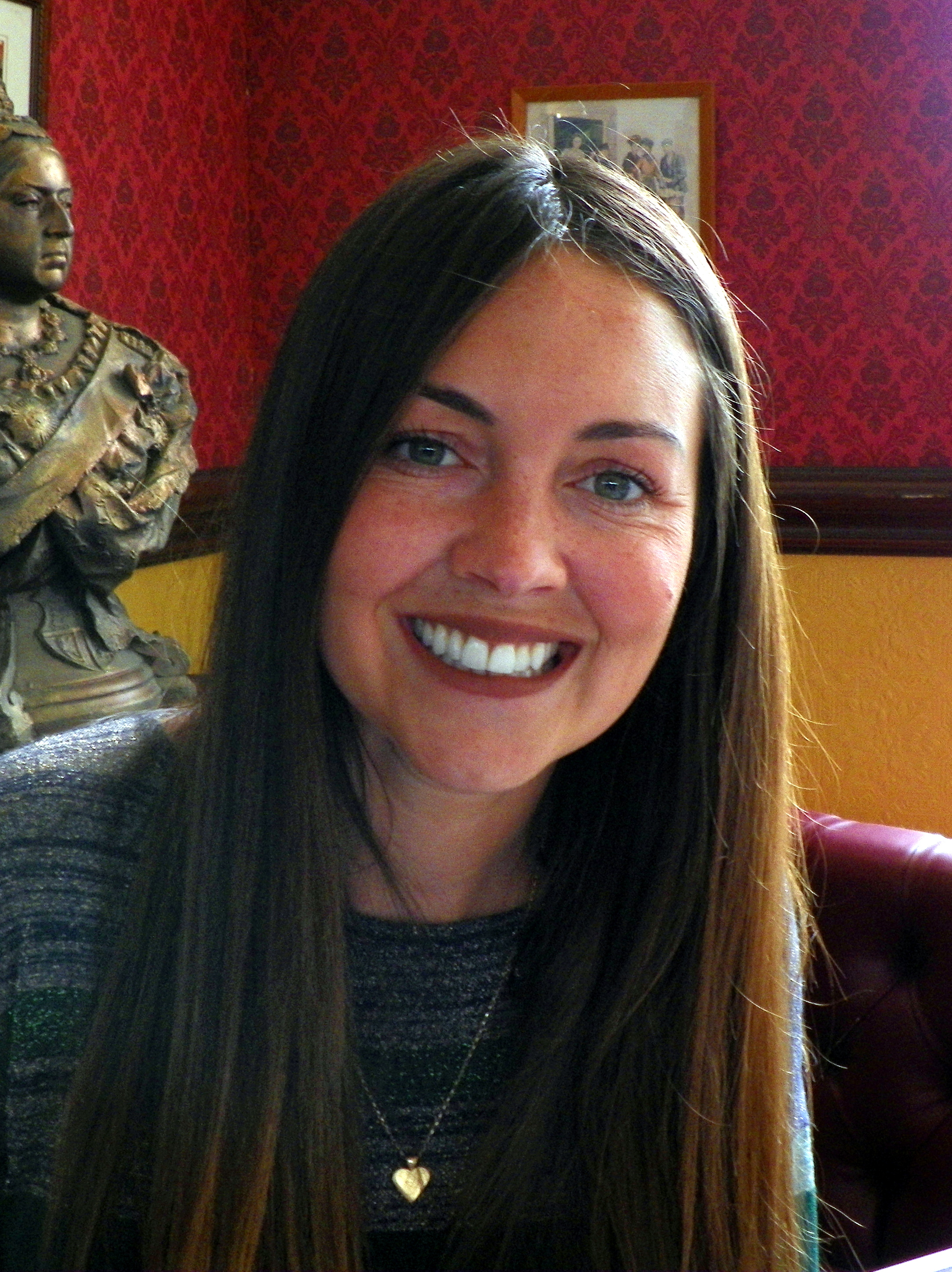
Actress Lacey Turner reprised her role as Stacey Slater in 2014, four years after she quit the show.

It was announced on 6 December 2013 that Turner had agreed to reprise her role as Stacey and that the character would return in early 2014. Executive producer Dominic Treadwell-Collins described Stacey as "one of EastEnders' best-loved characters, played by one of television's finest actors". He also commented, "Stacey's last time on the Square was iconic. But that was just the first act. There is so much more to come for Stacey." Matt Willis was cast as Stacey's partner Luke Riley and appeared across a guest stint. Lily was reintroduced alongside Stacey with the role recast to child actress Aine Garvey. Stacey and Lily return in February 2014, but Stacey departs during the following month after confessing to Archie's murder. Off-screen, Turner took a planned break to film BBC drama Our Girl. In May 2014, it was announced that Wright would film a guest stint to coincide with Stacey's return from her break. Treadwell-Collins confirmed that Stacey and Jean's relationship and bipolar disorder would be explored in upsetting scenes. Stacey and Jean returned in August. A second return for Jean was confirmed in May 2015 when it was teased that Jean and Ollie would marry, and Jean appears two months later in July.

Following her return, Stacey was shown to own a mystery key, starting a long-running storyline for the Slater family. In October 2015, it was announced that Riley Carter Millington had been cast as Kyle, a new character for the show. Millington's casting marked the first time a transgender actor has played the role of a transgender character in a British soap opera. Kyle is shown to have a key similar to Stacey in his first appearance. Jean made another guest return in December for the reveal of Stacey's key. At the time of the reveal, the story was described by Daniel Kilkelly of Digital Spy as "one of the longest-running mysteries in EastEnders history". During Jean's return, it emerges that Stacey's father and Jean's husband, Brian, was a bigamist and had a second family. Kyle was later confirmed to be Stacey's half-brother. In May 2016, accredited actress Denise Welch appeared in one episode of the soap, episode 5276, as Kyle's mother Alison Slater, who has not seen him since his transition.

=== Kat's secret son and Charlie's death ===
On 3 April 2015, it was announced that Kat, Alfie and their children would be written out of the series to appear in a spin-off series centering around the characters. The spin-off contains six episodes and was announced to air in 2016. Treadwell-Collins created the drama and looked forward to developing the series. He explained that he wanted to "take two of EastEnders' most beloved and enduring characters out of their comfort zone". The controller of BBC One, Charlotte Moore, said about Kat and Alfie's new story, "Rest assured, their rollercoaster isn't set to end any time soon." Wallace and Richie were delighted to be handed the series, with Wallace excited to "[explore] the next chapter for Kat". It was confirmed that the series would follow a new storyline established in the EastEnders. The storyline was revealed in May when it emerges that Kat unknowingly gave birth to a secret son: the twin brother of Zoe. Later in the month, the family leave the series after winning £1 million on a scratch card.

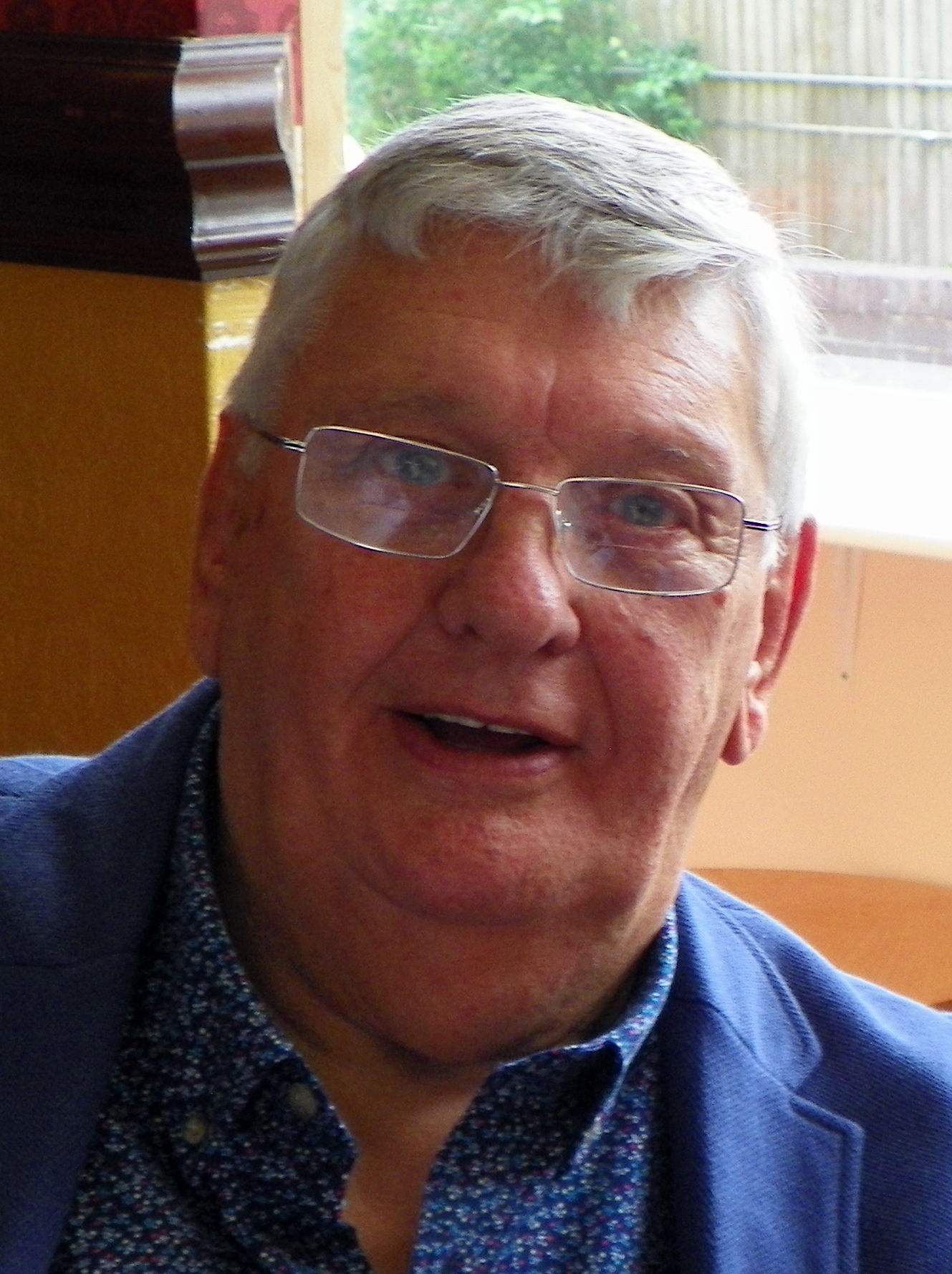
Family patriarch Charlie Slater, portrayed by Derek Martin (pictured), was killed off in January 2016.

In October 2015, it was announced that Kat, Alfie and their children would make a short return between December 2015 and January 2016. The guest stint leads towards the family's spin-off series and explores the Kat's secret son story as Kat discovers the truth. Treadwell-Collins teased that the return would "lead to tears, laughter and a mountain of secrets being unearthed for the Slater family". He said that the guest stint would make Kat realise that she needs to visit Ireland. It was later confirmed that Martin would reprise his role as Charlie for a guest appearance during Kat's return. Martin looked forward to filming with the Slater family again and stated that he would return as part of "a big and important storyline". Treadwell-Collins decided to kill off the character of Charlie during his guest stint. He promised Martin "a good send off" for the character, which the actor was pleased with. During the guest stint, Kat is told about her secret son and the tension in the family leads to Charlie's sudden death. Following Charlie's death, Belinda was reintroduced for a guest stint. Carli Norris took over the role and appeared in multiple episodes in January. Morse also departed following the Martin's exit. Following her exit, Morse criticised her departure and confirmed that she had never received an official departure, "leaving party or a present".

It was confirmed in August 2016 that the spin-off series would be titled Redwater, although this was later changed to Kat & Alfie: Redwater. Having originally been scheduled to air in 2016, Kat & Alfie: Redwater was delayed due to unconfirmed reasons. Filming took place in Ireland between April and July 2016. The drama is broadcast across six hour-long episodes between May and June 2017. The only characters from EastEnders to feature in the series are Kat (credited as Kathleen), Alfie and Tommy. Treadwell-Collins, who created the series, explained that the decision was made not to include Bert and Ernie as he believed that Kat and Alfie would be restricted by their appearance. The role of Tommy was recast for the drama with child actor Henry Proctor taking over the role. The first episode of the series sees Kat's son revealed to be murderous Catholic priest Dermott Dolan (Oisín Stack). The series ends on a cliffhanger as it is not known whether Kat and Alfie are alive or dead. Treadwell-Collins described the ending as "the mother of all cliffhangers". On 20 September 2017, it was announced that Kat & Alfie: Redwater would not return for a second series.

=== Merge with the Fowlers ===
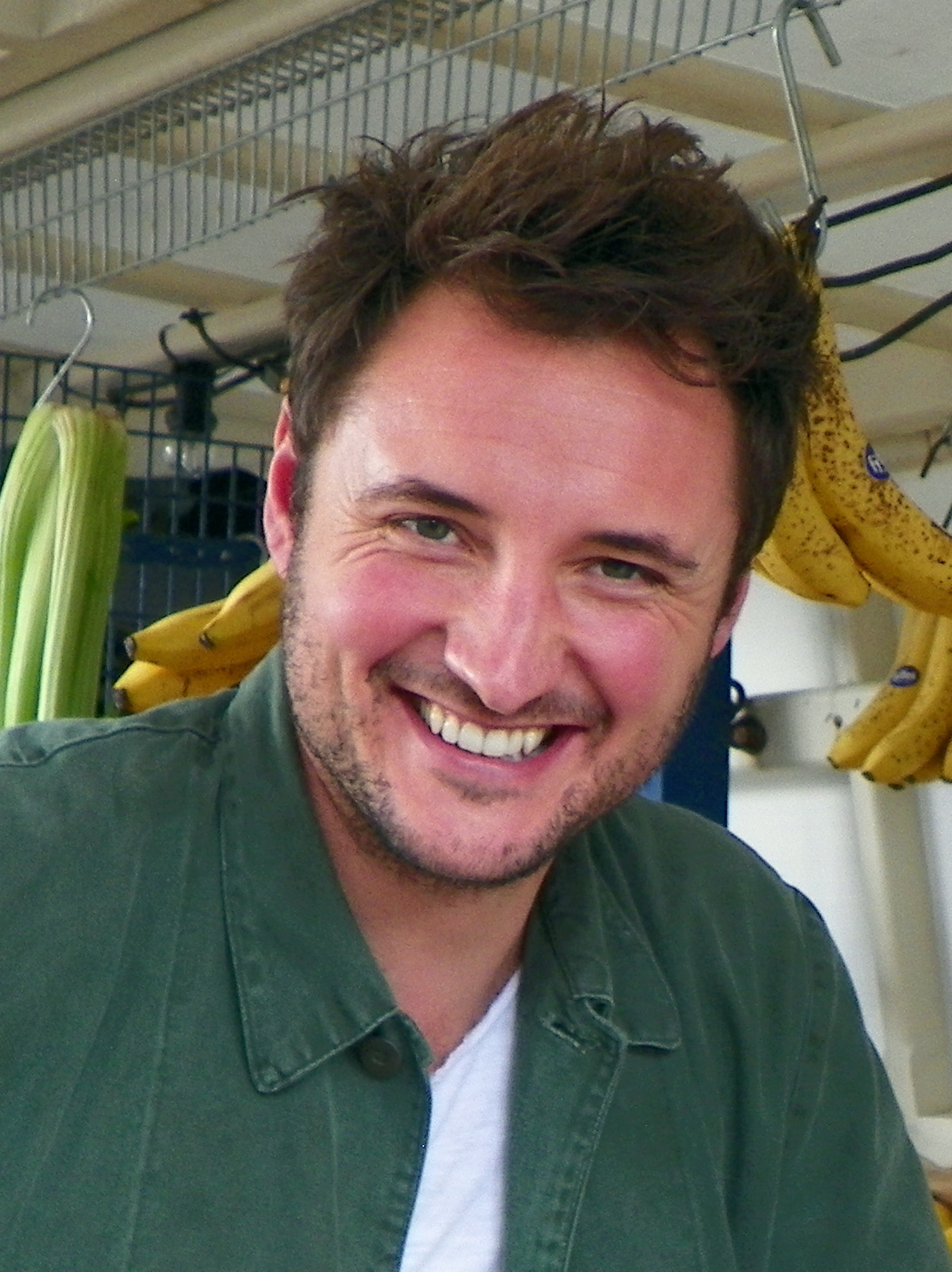
The Slaters are merged with the Fowler family following Stacey's pairing with Martin Fowler (James Bye, pictured).

Producers paired Stacey with Martin Fowler (James Bye) in 2015 and they shared an on-off relationship. It was confirmed in May 2015 that Stacey would have sex with Martin's best friend, Kush Kazemi (Davood Ghadami), who is also Stacey's best friend's partner. The following month, it was reported that Stacey would fall pregnant, sparking a "who's the daddy" storyline with either Martin or Kush as potential fathers. Part of the storyline sees Stacey stop taking her bipolar medication. Kush was later confirmed to be the father of Stacey's baby. In December 2015, it was announced that Stacey would be diagnosed with rare mental illness postpartum psychosis, a condition associated with mothers with bipolar disorder, after she gives birth across the Christmas period. EastEnders spoke with charities and women suffering from the condition to portray the story accurately. Treadwell-Collins confirmed that the story would continue into 2016 and would focus on the effects it has on Stacey and her family and friends. Stacey gives birth on Christmas Eve and she and Martin name the baby Arthur Fowler after Martin's father.

In January 2016, Martin discovers that he is not Arthur's father after being handed a letter written by Stacey while she recovers from her psychosis. They later reunite and Martin proposes to Stacey as she continues her recovery at the mother and baby unit. As Stacey recovers, Belinda returns in April to support her. Norris joined the show's regular cast and in May, it was announced that Gary Webster had been cast as Belinda's "successful, middle-class" husband, Neville Peacock. Belinda decides to move to Albert Square, but Neville disagrees and they split. Stacey and Martin marry during May 2016, establishing Stacey as a member of the Slater family and creating a new generation of the Fowler family. The wedding takes place during a week of episodes centering around the death of Peggy Mitchell (Barbara Windsor).

Following executive producer Sean O'Connor's hiring, multiple characters were written out of the soap. O'Connor decided not to renew the contracts of Millington and Norris. Belinda departs in November after deciding to travel with a friend, while Kyle departs later in the month after accepting a job in France. On his departure, Millington said that Kyle's time on the show had come to a "natural end". Both actors expressed an interest in returning to the soap. Stacey becomes pregnant again in 2017 with Martin's child. In the build-up to giving birth, Stacey has a seizure and is diagnosed with pre-eclampsia, which brings potential harm to her and the baby. She gives birth to a daughter, Hope Fowler, in October. The birth of Hope establishes the new generation of the Fowler family with Stacey as the matriarch. On Stacey and Martin's relationship and the family, Turner told David Brown of the Radio Times, "They're a real team and no matter what happens they always seem to come out the other end stronger than ever. She puts her trust in Martin to make everything better."

=== Revival of the family ===
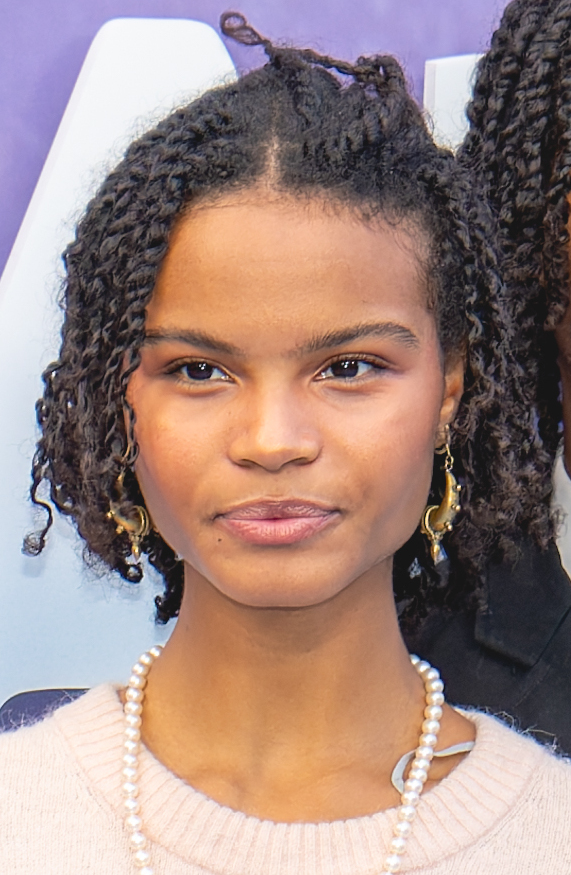
Indeyarna Donaldson-Holness (pictured) portrays Jasmine Fisher, Zoe's daughter. She was introduced in 2025.

On 20 December 2017, it was confirmed that Wallace, Wright and Morse would reprise their roles as Kat, Jean and Mo respectively. All three actresses expressed their delight at returning to the soap. Yorke also expressed his excitement at the family's revival and said that it was "a real joy to find a way to bring them back together". Upon her return, Wallace opined that Yorke had revisited the family aspect of EastEnders and the Slater family. On Yorke's creative choices with the family, Wallace commented, "There's the hustle and bustle of the Slaters, supporting each other, arguing with each other, laughing, it's just great." Mo returns in March 2018 and announces that Kat is dead, leading the residents of Albert Square to arrange a fundraising night in memory of Kat. Shortly after Mo, Jean returns followed by Kat.

Yorke also confirmed a new Slater family member would be introduced to the series. Katie Jarvis later joined the cast as Stacey's cousin, Hayley Slater. The actress expressed her disbelief at joining a family that she loves. In May, it emerges that Hayley is pregnant and when Alfie appears in two episodes, he is revealed to be the father. In September 2018, it was announced that Ashley McGuire has been cast in the role of Hayley's manipulative and villainous mother, Bev Slater. She appears across multiple guest stints. The following month, Hayley gives birth to a daughter, Cherry Slater. Following Alfie's return in November, Tommy, Bert and Ernie were reintroduced to the series. Shay Crotty reprised his role as Tommy, while the roles of Bert and Ernie were recast to Elliot Briffett and Cody Briffett respectively. The family are central to the 2018 Christmas episodes as the truth about Cherry's paternity is revealed.

In 2025, two further members were added to the family: twins Jasmine Fisher (Indeyarna Donaldson-Holness) and Josh Goodwin (Joshua Vaughan). The twins debuted following the return of Zoe, after Ryan reprised her role following 20 years away from EastEnders. They were eventually revealed to be Zoe's twins, whom she had with Anthony Trueman (Nicholas Bailey), who Zoe dated during her original tenure on the soap.

== Family members ==
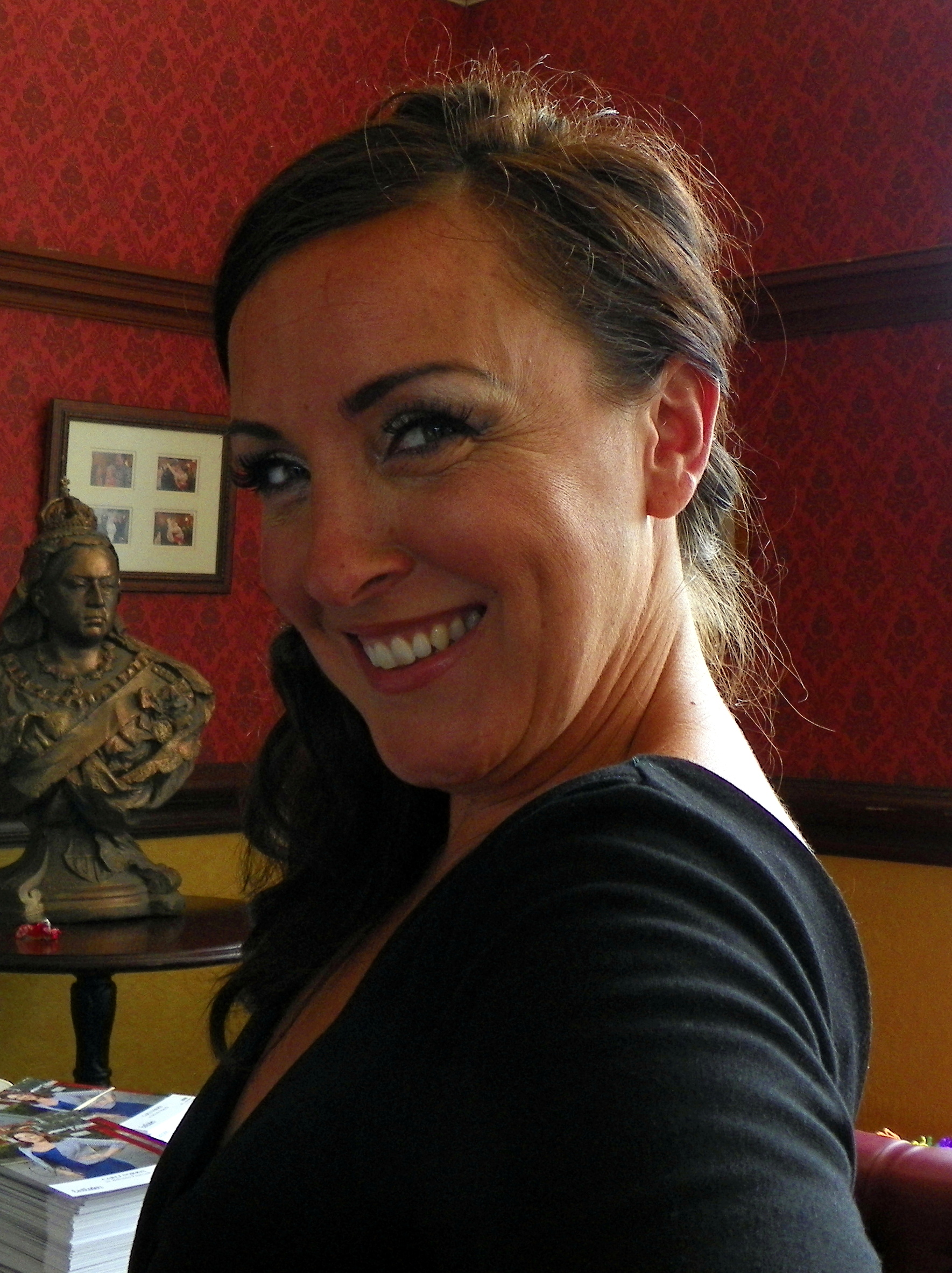
Carli Norris (pictured) portrayed Belinda Peacock in 2016.

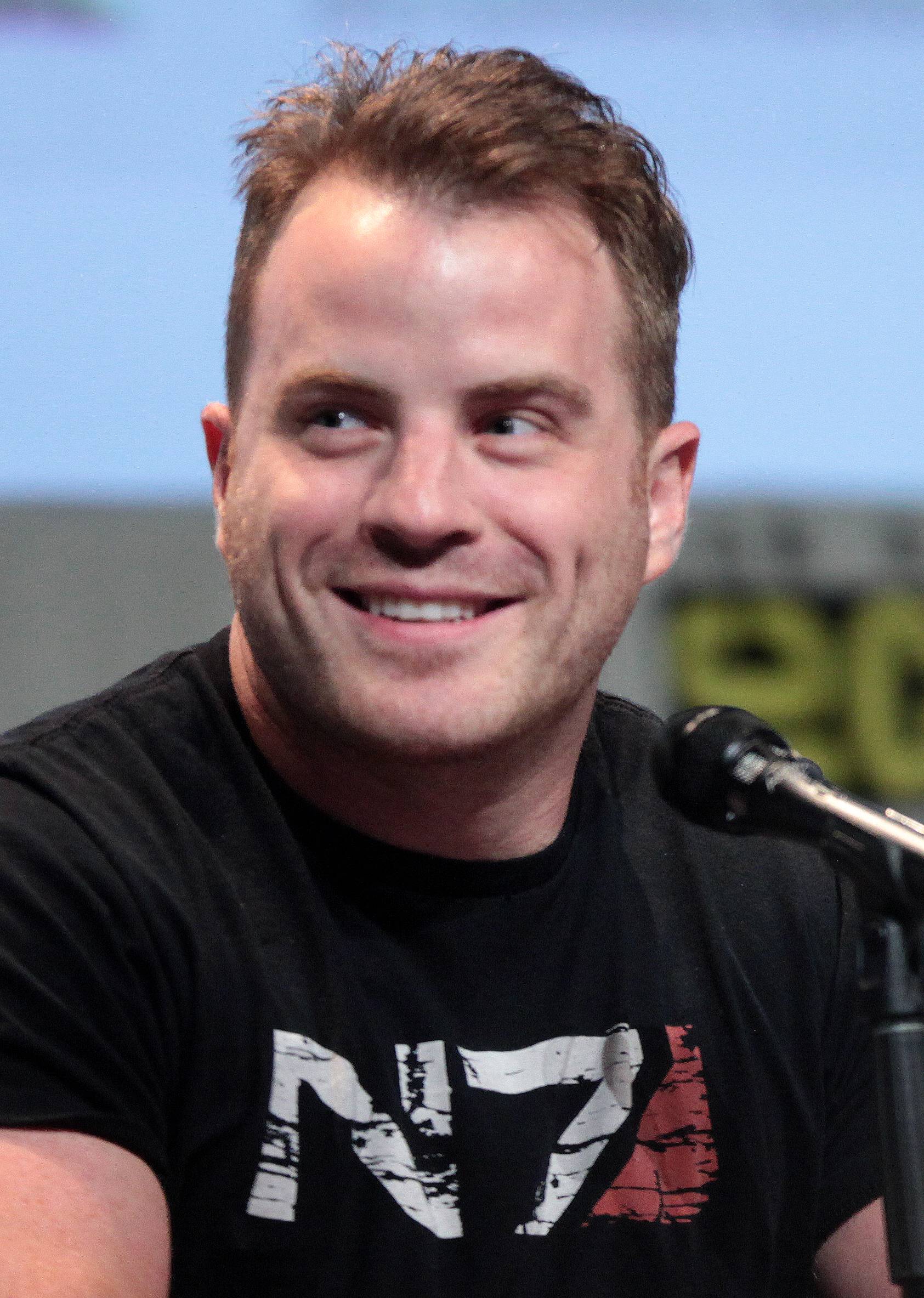
Sean Slater, the brother of Stacey Slater (Lacey Turner), was played by actor Robert Kazinsky.

- Frederick Slater, married to Mary Slater
  - Charlie Slater, married to Viv Slater
    - Lynne Hobbs, married to Garry Hobbs
      - Vivienne Hobbs, daughter of Lynne and Garry
    - Kat Slater, married to Alfie Moon and Phil Mitchell
      - Zoe Slater, daughter of Kat and Harry Slater
        - Josh Goodwin, son of Zoe and Anthony Trueman
        - Jasmine Fisher, daughter of Zoe and Anthony
      - Dermott Dolan, son of Kat and Harry, Zoe's twin brother
      - Tommy Moon, son of Kat and Michael Moon
      - Bert Moon, son of Kat and Alfie
      - Ernie Moon, son of Kat and Alfie
    - Belinda Peacock, married to Neville Peacock
    - Little Mo Mitchell, married to Trevor Morgan and Billy Mitchell
      - Freddie Slater, son of Little Mo and Graham Foster
  - Harry Slater
    - Zoe Slater, daughter of Harry and Kat
    - Dermott Dolan, son of Harry and Kat, Zoe's twin brother
  - Violet Slater
    - Brian Slater, son of Violet, married to Jean Slater and Alison Slater
      - Sean Slater, married to Roxy Mitchell
      - Stacey Slater, married to Bradley Branning, Martin Fowler and Eve Unwin
        - Lily Slater, daughter of Stacey and Ryan Malloy
          - Charli Slater, daughter of Lily and Ricky Branning
        - Arthur Fowler, son of Stacey and Kush Kazemi
        - Hope Fowler, daughter of Stacey and Martin
      - Shannon Slater, daughter of Brian and Alison
      - Siobhan Slater, daughter of Brian and Alison
      - Kyle Slater, son of Brian and Alison
    - Unknown, married to Bev Slater
      - Hayley Slater
        - Cherry Slater, daughter of Hayley and Alfie

Charlie's mother-in-law, Mo Harris, is also considered a member of the family.

== Other appearances ==
The Slaters (Kat, Lynne, Little Mo, Zoe, Charlie, Mo and Belinda) feature in EastEnders' first DVD, Slaters in Detention, released in November 2003. The comedic special was written by the family's creator, Tony Jordan, and focuses on a night out for the family where they all finish up in a prison cell dressed as schoolgirls, discussing their lives.

In November 2018, it was announced that the show would launch a new audio drama spin-off series, EastEnders: The Podcast, following different characters. The first episode, released on 28 November, is 20-minutes in length and focuses on Kat, Alfie and Hayley and their time in Spain, set in March 2018. The podcast special builds towards the 2018 Christmas episodes.

== Reception ==
In December 2003, a BBC spokesperson called the Slaters "arguably the most successful family in soap". On the family, Jess Wilson, writing for OK!, commented, "The Slater sisters were among one of the most popular families to join EastEnders in recent times, and they certainly wasted no time making themselves known on the Square." Her colleague, Laura Donaldson, described the Slater family as "one of the most iconic families" in the soap. She added that the family have been at the centre of "the show's most dramatic and shocking moments". Reflecting on the family in December 2017, Yorke commented, "The Slaters are one of the all-time great families in EastEnders and Albert Square has never felt quite the same since they scattered to different ends of the country, and in some cases beyond."

The Slater family was shortlisted for "Best Family" for the 2022 Inside Soap Awards. They were longlisted for the same award at the 2025 Inside Soap Awards.
