= Charlie Slater =

Fictional character from EastEnders

- EastEnders character
- Derek Martin as Charlie Slater (2011)
- Portrayed by: Derek Martin (2000–2016); Richie Daysh (2018 flashback); Martin Maynard (2025 flashback)
- Duration: 2000–2011, 2013, 2016, 2018, 2025
- First appearance: Episode 1997; 4 September 2000
- Last appearance: Episode 7216; 30 October 2025
- Created by: Tony Jordan
- Introduced by: John Yorke (2000, 2018); Bryan Kirkwood (2011); Dominic Treadwell-Collins (2013, 2016); Ben Wadey (2025)
- Spin-off appearances: Slaters in Detention (2003); Pat and Mo (2004); EastEnders: E20 (2010)
In-universe information
- Occupation: Taxi driver Potman
- Family: Slater
- Father: Frederick Slater
- Mother: Mary Slater
- Brothers: Harry Slater
- Sisters: Violet Slater
- Wife: Viv Slater (backstory)
- Daughters: Lynne Hobbs; Kat Slater; Belinda Peacock; Little Mo Mitchell
- Adoptive daughters: Zoe Slater
- Grandsons: Freddie Slater; Dermott Dolan; Tommy Moon; Bert Moon; Ernie Moon
- Granddaughters: Zoe Slater; Vivienne Hobbs
- Nephews: Brian Slater
- Nieces: Zoe Slater
- Other relatives: Stacey Slater; Sean Slater; Lily Slater; Josh Goodwin; Jasmine Fisher

Charlie Slater is a fictional character from the BBC soap opera EastEnders, played by Derek Martin. Charlie's first appearance is in the episode first broadcast in the United Kingdom on 4 September 2000. He was played by Richie Daysh in a 2018 flashback, and Martin Maynard in a 2025 flashback. He also makes a cameo appearance in the second series of the spin-off EastEnders: E20. The character was killed-off in Episode 5208, broadcast on 7 January 2016, after suffering a heart attack.

In April 2010, the character was axed among five others by new executive producer Bryan Kirkwood as part of a plan to "breathe new life into the show". The reaction to Charlie's axing was negative, with Stuart Heritage from The Guardian saying that it "should be a national day of mourning" and Phil Daniels, who had previously played Kevin Wicks, also criticised the axings, stating that Charlie was a "good character". He departed from EastEnders on 13 January 2011. Martin returned for a two-episode stint in April; his return saw 10.31 million people watch on 19 April and 8.43 million on 21 April. On 3 November 2013, it was announced that Martin would return again, this time on 24 and 25 December 2013. It was announced in October 2015 that Charlie would make another guest appearance in 2016, appearing in five episodes from 4 to 7 January. It was confirmed that Charlie would die from a heart attack during this stint. The character very briefly appeared in a flashback on 25 December 2018.

== Creation and development ==
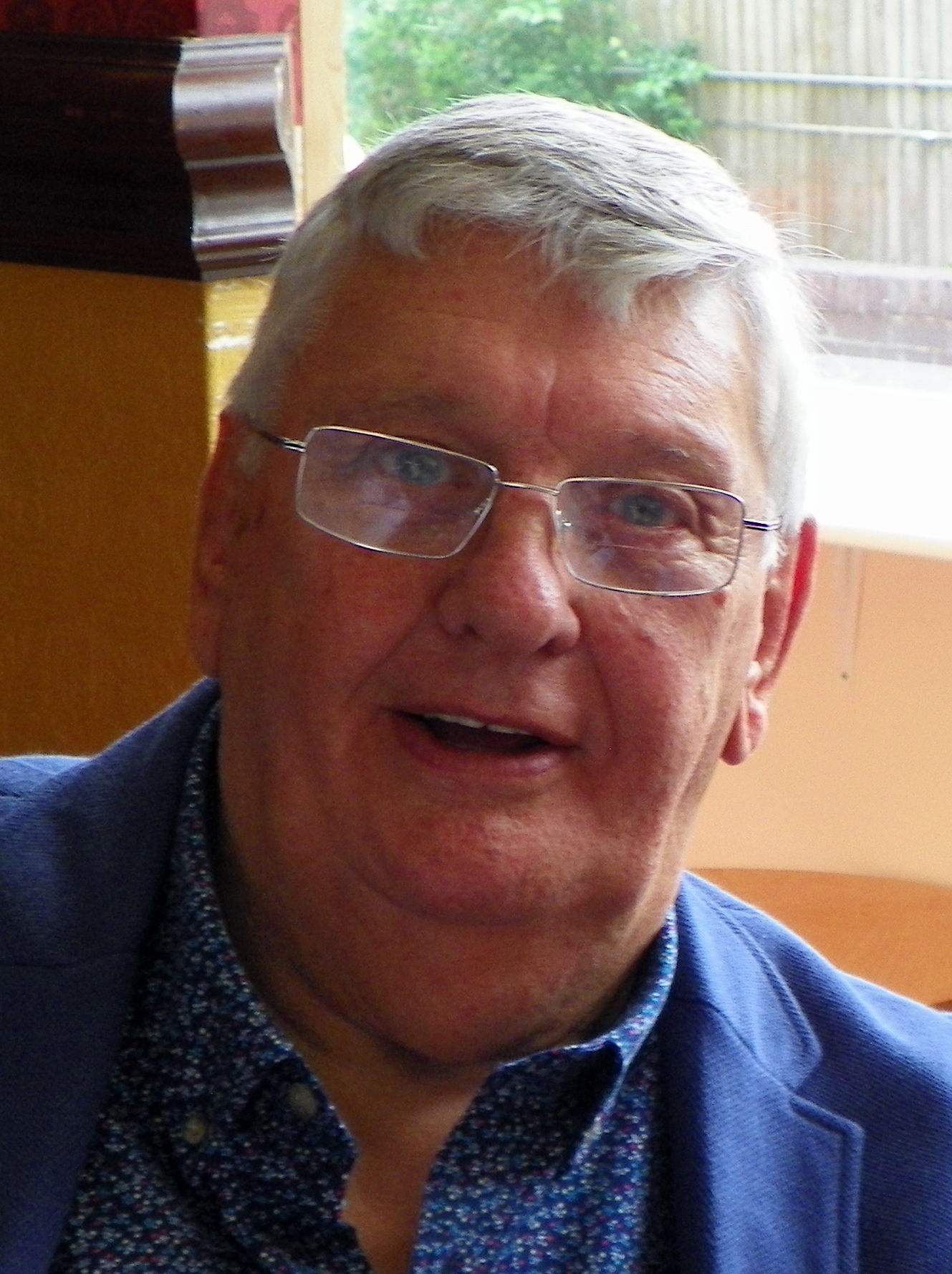
Derek Martin (pictured) auditioned for the roles of Den Watts and Frank Butcher before securing the role of Charlie Slater.

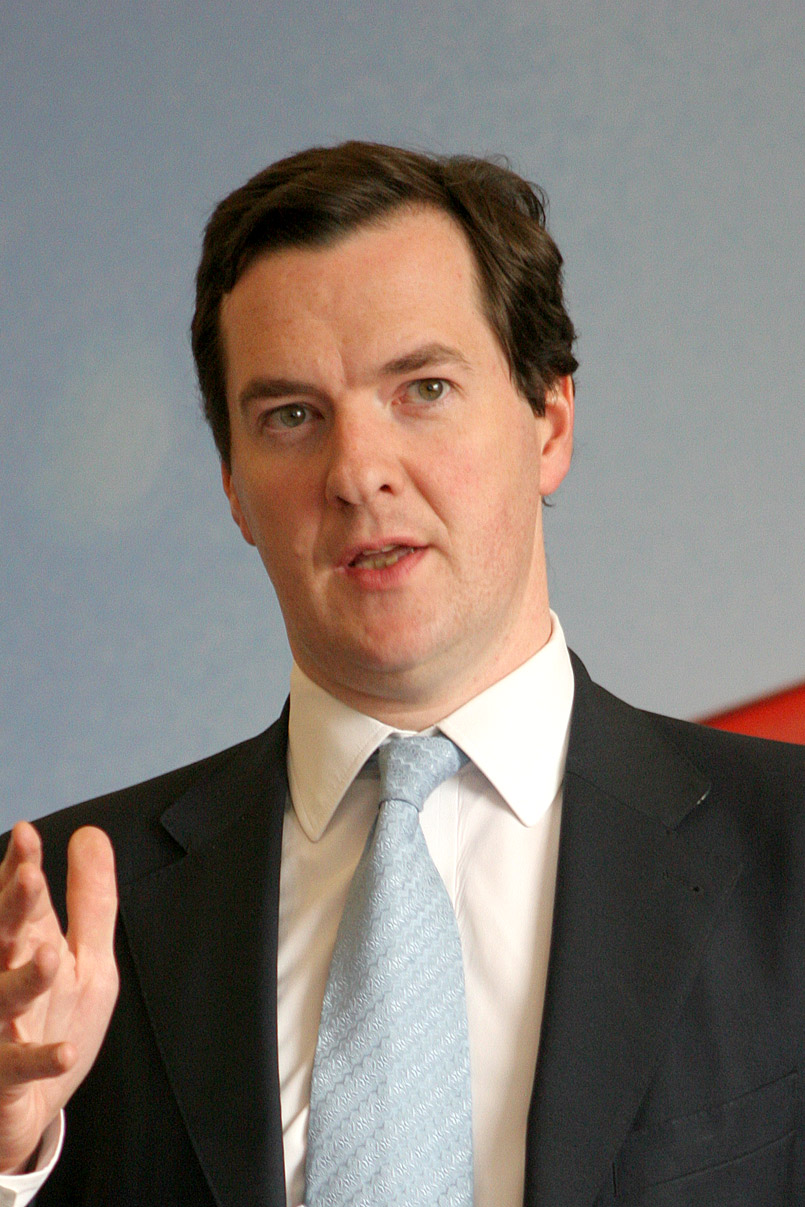
In a last minute scene, Charlie and Patrick Trueman discussed George Osborne's Spending Review.

Derek Martin had previously auditioned for the roles of Den Watts and Frank Butcher in the 1980s and was shortlisted for both roles, but was ultimately unsuccessful. He requested to screen-test for the role of Charlie in 2000. He was successful and offered a contract with the soap for a minimum of three years, with potential for longer. Martin described playing Charlie as "comfortable", like putting on an "old coat" and stated in 2002 that he would like to stay with EastEnders until he dies. He described Charlie as an easy-going family man. The EastEnders website calls Charlie "mild mannered" and the rock that keeps the Slater family together, as well as "positive as long as his family's round him." He was also described as a 'devoted dad'. In 2009 it was announced that Martin would take a break from the series. His temporary departure storyline saw Charlie run away with his new love interest, Brenda Boyle (Carmel Cryan), however BBC confirmed that he would return in a "few weeks time". The storyline involved Charlie jumping in front of a bus to stop her from emigrating to Madeira. A spokesperson said, "Charlie's move is only temporary and that he will return soon. His heart remains in Walford." It was reported in February 2010 that Martin's real-life knee surgery would be scripted into the show. He said, "My operation will probably be in the middle of May and then hopefully you'll see Charlie on crutches". Martin's operation was in April 2010 and Martin revealed, "I went back to EastEnders at that point and a runner followed me round with a chair and my sticks." Although Charlie was never seen on crutches, he had a limp in episodes broadcast in April 2011.

=== Departure and 2011 return ===
Charlie left EastEnders on 13 January 2011. Martin opined that his favourite storyline to film was finding out that Kat was raped by Harry, on which he stated "I shared some emotional scenes with Kat during that storyline." He later stated that the storyline was "very strong". In October 2010, a last minute scene was filmed involving Charlie and Patrick, focusing on George Osborne's Spending Review, in which the characters discuss the impact of the Chancellor's plans. Talking about the baby swap storyline involving Kat, Alfie, Ronnie Branning (Samantha Womack) and Jack Branning (Scott Maslen), Martin explained that he only read his own parts of the script, so thought that Charlie simply leaves his grandson alone, gets drunk and the baby dies. On Charlie's part in the story, he said "[T]hat's terrible guilt obviously—because [he] feel[s] as though it's [his] fault that he's died. I was surprised when I saw the story come out [...] that it was a baby swap." In his autobiography, released in 2013, Martin revealed that the storyline originally planned for Charlie's exit was that he have a heart attack and die. He also spoke about his shock at being axed: "You know it's part and parcel of the profession to be in and out of work but after thinking Charlie was part of the future of the show, I was shocked. I simply didn't see it coming." Martin revealed that he immediately called former executive producer, John Yorke, who had introduced the character to the show, and told him of his impending on-screen death. Martin then revealed that he had received a call from current producers, who said Charlie was not to be killed off, and would simply go to live with eldest daughter, Lynne.

On 2 March 2011, it was announced that Martin had recently returned to film two episodes. An EastEnders source told Digital Spy, "Although they've had their ups and downs, Kat deeply regrets pushing Charlie away. The pair have a tearful reunion and there won't be a dry eye in the house." Jessie Wallace, who plays Charlie's daughter Kat Slater, said that Charlie would help Kat come to terms with the fact that her baby is still alive, "With what happened the night they thought Tommy died, things were still unresolved for them. Although they cleared the air before he left, things weren't right between them, so to have him back with her now makes it all the more special. It's also Charlie that makes Kat realise that she needs to bond with Tommy. He makes her see that she can do this." Martin returned for two episodes, on 19 and 21 April 2011, with his return bringing in 10.31 million viewers on 19 April, and 8.43 million on 21 April.

=== 2013 and 2016 returns ===
It was announced on 3 November 2013 that Charlie would be making a brief return to screens over the Christmas period. Martin was revealed to have already filmed his return and would appear in one episode in December. Details surrounding Charlie's reason to return was being kept secret from the public, but was tipped to involve his daughter, Kat. A show spokesperson confirmed Martin's return. Speaking of his return, Martin said: "It was wonderful to go back after all this time. I got a call saying they wanted me to do an episode for Christmas. I walked into the Queen Vic on my first day and it was like I'd never left." Spoiler pictures showing Charlie's return was released on 8 December. The pictures showed Kat and her husband, Alfie, celebrating their final day in charge of The Queen Victoria, with Mo joining them alongside Charlie. On 22 December 2013, Martin revealed that he wants a permanent return to EastEnders following his guest return at Christmas, which was said to last two episodes, "Who knows, if Charlie goes down well this Christmas, maybe it will all become more permanent. Nothing's been said but I can't help hoping." Charlie's return scenes aired on 24 and 25 December 2013, with 7.65 million tuning in to watch on 24 December and 8.60 million on 25 December. Lacey Turner, who plays Charlie's great niece Stacey Branning, expressed an interest in Charlie and her on-screen mother, Jean (Gillian Wright) returning, "Having scenes with the Slaters is my favourite thing, though. It would be great if we could get Derek Martin and Gillian Wright back."

In April 2014, Martin revealed that cast members, including Jessie Wallace (Kat) and Shane Richie (Alfie), have asked producers on various occasions whether Martin can return to the soap on a permanent basis. He commented, "Everyone, including Shane and Jessie, have been asking them upstairs, 'When can we have Derek?' and Dominic [Treadwell-Collins] has said he will see how it goes." In October 2014, it was announced that there was a possibility Martin would be returning to the show in early 2015. Despite Martin telling the Daily Star that he would be returning for a handful of episodes for an unknown storyline, an EastEnders spokesperson said the return was to be finalised. The spokesperson said: "It hasn't been confirmed if Derek will be returning, as it is still a little while off yet as we are still at the planning stages." Martin did not return to the show as previously rumoured.

In October 2015, it was announced that Martin would be returning to the show for a guest appearance over the Christmas period. The announcement that Charlie would returning on-screen came only a day following the announcement Kat and Alfie would make a brief return over the Christmas period. The show released no further information surrounding Charlie's return, but said the return of Charlie, Kat and Alfie would lead to the latter's 2016 six-part drama. Speaking of his return, Martin said: "I'm so excited to be coming back into such a big and important storyline and I can't wait to get stuck in and be back with the family again." The character was killed off. Martin said of his on-screen death, "I spoke to Dominic, the executive producer, and he explained [the storyline] and said he'd give me a good send off. In a way its closure, after 11 years, which for an actor is wonderful."

== Storylines ==
Charlie, a taxicab driver, who is widowed from Viv Slater (April Martin), arrives in Walford with Viv's mother Big Mo Harris (Laila Morse) and Charlie's four daughters: Lynne (Elaine Lordan), Kat (Jessie Wallace), Little Mo (Kacey Ainsworth), and Zoe (Michelle Ryan), plus Lynne's boyfriend, Garry Hobbs (Ricky Groves). It soon emerges that Kat is actually Zoe's mother and that it has been kept a family secret until Zoe finds out. Demanding to know the identity of her birth father, Zoe and Charlie are stunned to discover that it was Charlie's younger brother Harry Slater (Michael Elphick), who raped Kat when she was a teenager. Little Mo, now married to Billy Mitchell (Perry Fenwick), is raped by Graham Foster (Alex McSweeney). When Charlie finds out, he attacks Graham after locking him in his taxi. Charlie is arrested and remanded in custody for grievous bodily harm, to which he pleads guilty, but the family has to pay Graham £10,000 compensation. Charlie's cab license is revoked, but is later restored. Lynne, now married to Garry, leaves Walford after her baby, Vivienne, is stillborn. Charlie's great-niece Stacey Slater (Lacey Turner) moves in, and Charlie becomes a father figure to her, helping her curb her rebellious and wayward attitude. At the same time, he comforts Zoe after she has an abortion. Zoe eventually leaves, soon followed by Kat, who is now married to Alfie Moon (Shane Richie). However, Stacey's mother Jean Slater (Gillian Wright) moves in with the family.

Charlie puts an advertisement in a lonely hearts column and becomes a member of an internet dating website, meeting and falling for Brenda Boyle (Carmel Cryan), a Salvation Army member from Clacton. However, their romance begins to fizzle out. After not seeing each other for several weeks, Brenda ends the relationship, telling Charlie that she and her brother are moving to Madeira. Not wishing to end the relationship, Charlie gets approval from Stacey and Mo to go with her. He returns not long after with a Russian woman named Orlenda (Mary Tamm). Mo is suspicious of her and follows her around. On seeing her with another man, Mo takes a photo to show Charlie. Charlie confronts Orlenda, who admits that she was using Charlie for his money and he asks her to leave. When Stacey stops taking medication for her bipolar disorder, Charlie insists that she has to start again as she almost lost her baby Lily. Charlie asks Dot Branning (June Brown) to speak to Stacey as he believes that Lily's father is Stacey's deceased husband Bradley (Charlie Clements), Dot's step-grandson. Dot then reveals that Lily is not Bradley's. Charlie asks Stacey why she has not told the truth and begs her to take her pills, trying to force one into her mouth. Stacey says she has already taken them and Charlie apologises, then walks out of the house in tears. He spends the night at Patrick Trueman's (Rudolph Walker) house, and invites Patrick and Jim Branning (John Bardon) for drinks. Later, Sam Mitchell (Danniella Westbrook) asks Charlie to take her to the hospital because she is worried her baby Richard is unwell, however after driving part way, Charlie tells her the symptoms are normal. As he turns around, he reverses into some boxes in front of a van, and is then stopped by a police officer (Laurence Mitchell). The next day, Mo opens a letter for Charlie and learns he was caught driving over the limit. They argue as he could lose his driving licence, and Charlie later apologises to Stacey for forcing her to take her pills.

Charlie is shocked when his daughter Kat returns to Albert Square. Kat is trying to avoid some thugs to whom she owes money. They catch up with her at Charlie's house, and Kat tries to escape. In the commotion, Charlie reminds Kat that she hasn't even asked about his life or anyone else's in Walford. Kat's estranged husband, Alfie, then arrives and chases the thugs away. However, Charlie is then dismayed to learn that Kat is pregnant, and Alfie is not the father. Alfie and Kat reopen The Queen Vic as landlords and give Charlie a job there as a potman. Kat gives birth to Tommy, on the same day Ronnie Branning (Samantha Womack) gives birth to her son, James. Kat is rushed to hospital, leaving Tommy in Charlie's care, but he joins the New Year's Eve party instead. James dies of cot death, so Ronnie secretly swaps him with a perfectly healthy Tommy. Alfie and the rest of the family then discover the dead baby, believing it to be Tommy. Charlie admits to Kat that the baby was left alone as he was drinking, so Kat blames him for the baby's death. Charlie tries to make things right, but eventually realises it is best for him to leave. Mo begs him to stay but he refuses. Mo tells Kat and Alfie, and when Alfie says fathers have feelings too, they run to the tube station. Kat forgives Charlie and he leaves to stay with Lynne. When Kat and Alfie receive Tommy back, Charlie visits Kat and helps her bond with her son. Kat asks Charlie to return to Walford, but he refuses as he is in a relationship with a younger woman named Eileen, and they are getting married. Soon after, he returns to Lynne's. Off-screen, Charlie suffers a stroke. Kat, Alfie, Tommy and Shenice Quinn (Lily Harvey) go to visit him in hospital and stay with him for a while. Soon after, Alfie returns with Shenice and reveals Kat and Tommy are staying with Charlie until he recovers. Kat later returns to Walford with Tommy. Charlie visits Kat and Alfie for Christmas to celebrate their last days in The Queen Vic, and is delighted to learn that Kat is pregnant again.

Charlie returns, following the birth of Stacey's son Arthur Fowler. Kat then learns that she had given birth to a boy, along with Zoe. Charlie admits to Kat that he knew about Stacey's father, Brian's, other family and that he did nothing to stop him. When an angry Kat demands the truth from Mo about her son, Charlie suffers a heart attack. Charlie manages to tell Kat that he loves her, before going into cardiac arrest. The paramedics arrive minutes later, but are unable to save Charlie and he is pronounced dead. Alone, Kat says her final goodbyes to her father before kissing him goodnight on the forehead. Shortly afterwards, Stacey runs away from Walford; however, she has a hallucination of Charlie (a symptom of her postpartum psychosis) in the form of a taxi driver, who convinces her to return home.

== Other appearances ==
Charlie makes a cameo appearance in episode 6 of EastEnders: E20, where he is eating dinner in front of the television when there is a power cut, caused by Sol Levi (Tosin Cole) and Stevie Dickinson (Amanda Fairbank-Hynes).

== Reception ==
James Donaghy from The Guardian called Charlie "a lovely bloke" and "the embodiment of salt-of-the-earth decency and stupidity", saying one of his favourite moments in Charlie's time in EastEnders was his attack on Trevor. Grace Dent, also from The Guardian, said that one of her favourite soap opera moments of 2008 was when an escaped tarantula crawled up Charlie's leg.

The episode in which he left following the aftermath of the baby swap storyline attracted 10 million viewers, according to Digital Spy. His two-episode return saw on 19 April, 10.31 million people watch and 8.43 million on 21 April. Christopher Hooton from the Metro newspaper negatively reviewed Charlie's exit scenes, saying, "Unfortunately the long-time cast member's exit felt a little rushed. [...] As EastEnders characters' last hurrahs go, Charlie Slater's will not be going down in TV history." Stuart Heritage from The Guardian criticised Kirkwood's axing of the characters, saying, "By rights, this should be a national day of mourning. EastEnders has got a new executive producer – Bryan Kirkwood – and, as executive producers so often do, he's decided to spend his first few days hiding in a bush, taking out several characters with a poisoned blowpipe. This weekend it emerged that six EastEnders characters are to get the chop. Some of them are long-standing and beloved, like Charlie Slater and Minty." Phil Daniels, who played Kevin Wicks in the soap, criticised the axing of Charlie, along with that of the other five cast members, as they were "good characters". A reporter writing for the Inside Soap Yearbook 2017 (released in November 2016) described Charlie's death as "tragic".

In 2020, Sara Wallis and Ian Hyland from The Daily Mirror placed Charlie 91st on their ranked list of the best EastEnders characters of all time, calling him "Salt-of-the-earth" and commenting "No wonder he died of a stroke" due to giving out "tea and sympathy to the wild Slater women".

== In popular culture ==
The character of Charlie Slater has been spoofed in the cartoon sketch show 2DTV. It was revealed that in July 2005 Derek Martin would appear as a guest star on the third series of Little Britain. He played himself and was constantly referred to by the character of Marjorie Dawes as "Charlie Slater".
