= Lynne Hobbs =

Fictional character from EastEnders

- EastEnders character
- Elaine Lordan as Lynne Slater (2003)
- Portrayed by: Elaine Lordan; Isabelle Jones (2018 flashback); Libby Brake (2025 flashback)
- Duration: 2000–2004, 2018, 2025
- First appearance: Episode 2003; 18 September 2000
- Last appearance: Episode 7216; 30 October 2025
- Created by: Tony Jordan
- Introduced by: John Yorke (2000, 2018); Ben Wadey (2025)
- Spin-off appearances: Slaters in Detention (2003)
In-universe information
- Other names: Lynne Slater
- Occupation: Café worker
- Family: Slater
- Father: Charlie Slater
- Mother: Viv Slater
- Sisters: Kat Slater; Belinda Peacock; Little Mo Mitchell
- Husband: Garry Hobbs (2001–2004)
- Daughters: Vivienne Hobbs
- Grandmothers: Mo Harris
- Uncles: Harry Slater
- Nephews: Dermott Dolan; Tommy Moon; Bert Moon; Ernie Moon; Freddie Slater
- Nieces: Zoe Slater
- Other relatives: Jasmine Fisher; Josh Goodwin; Stacey Slater; Sean Slater; Kyle Slater; Lily Slater; Arthur Fowler; Hope Fowler; Hayley Slater; Cherry Slater

Lynne Hobbs (also Slater) is a fictional character from the BBC soap opera EastEnders, played by Elaine Lordan. The character appears between 18 September 2000 and 2 July 2004. Lynne is a fierce judge of right and wrong, although she is not always able to practise what she preaches. She has a turbulent relationship with her husband Garry Hobbs (Ricky Groves), but despite her complaints about him, it ends up being Lynne's adultery that puts their relationship in jeopardy long before Garry strays.

She appeared in a flashback in 2018 played by Isabelle Jones and in video footage in 2025, portrayed by Libby Brake.

== Creation and development ==
In 2000, EastEnders' executive producer John Yorke decided to introduce the "classic" Slater family. He felt the show needed to go back to its roots and bring back some traditional values. BBC's head of drama, Mal Young commented, "We do not have enough solid families in the soap, there were a lot of fractured families and people who were alone." The family were created as a replacement for the di Marco family, who were axed by Yorke. The family consisted of, grandmother Mo Harris (Laila Morse), father Charlie (Derek Martin), his four children, Lynne (Elaine Lordan), Kat (Jessie Wallace), Little Mo (Kacey Ainsworth), Zoe (Michelle Ryan), as well as Lynne's boyfriend Garry Hobbs (Ricky Groves). It later transpired that Kat was the mother of Zoe, after being raped by her uncle Harry Slater (Michael Elphick).

On 15 December 2003, it was announced that Lynne would be departing the following year. The decision was a mutual decision between Lordan and show producers and Lynne departed in July 2004.

== Storylines ==
Lynne is the eldest of the Slater sisters and she arrives in Albert Square in 2000 with her family: father Charlie Slater (Derek Martin), sisters Kat Slater (Jessie Wallace), Little Mo Morgan (Kacey Ainsworth) and Zoe Slater (Michelle Ryan), and grandmother Mo Harris (Laila Morse). Unlike Little Mo and Zoe, Lynne is aware that Zoe is in fact Kat's daughter and helps keep the family secret until Kat reveals the truth to Zoe.

Lynne is in a relationship with hapless mechanic Garry Hobbs (Ricky Groves) and spends much of her time despairing over Garry's inability to fully commit to their relationship. All Lynne really wants is to marry Garry, settle down and raise a family but while Garry loves Lynne, he is reluctant to lose his "bachelor status" and he spends much of his time dodging Lynne's 'hints' about marriage. However, Lynne (and the rest of the Slaters) wear Garry down and the two eventually get engaged. Lynne works in Ian Beale's (Adam Woodyatt) café and often clashes with co-worker, Janine Butcher (Charlie Brooks), who regularly slacks off work and flirts with Garry to irritate her. This culminates in Lynne eventually getting Janine fired and the two become enemies thereafter.

In 2001, Lynne becomes friends with womanising club owner Beppe di Marco (Michael Greco) and she often babysits his son, Joe di Marco (Jake Kyprianou). Lynne and Beppe soon become attracted to each other and have sex on the eve of Lynne's wedding to Garry. Beppe feels Garry does not deserve Lynne and tries to stop Lynne marrying him by turning up at the register office and starting a fight with Garry. Lynne is tempted but goes through with the wedding. Beppe sends Steve Owen (Martin Kemp) to give her a note, but Steve throws it away. The marriage does not go smoothly, however, and in 2002 Lynne strays again, this time with ex-lover Jason James (Joseph Millson). Jason is Lynne's ex-fiancé, who jilted her on their wedding day and fled to Dubai. After a chance meeting, the two rekindle their relationship as Jason wants to reconcile and almost persuades her to leave Garry and move away with him. However, at the last minute, Lynne changes her mind and chooses to stay with her family instead of following her heart. Garry forgives Lynne as he is desperate to hang onto her but the trust has gone from their relationship.

In 2003, another affair jeopardises Lynne's marriage, but this time it is Garry who strays. Garry has drunken sex with Laura Beale (Hannah Waterman) and she gets pregnant. Laura's husband, Ian, reveals to her that he has had a vasectomy so the baby cannot be his and throws her out so she turns to Garry for support, thinking he is her baby's father. Lynne has been trying for a baby and struggles to forgive Garry for having a baby with another woman, throwing him out so he moves in with Laura to support her during her pregnancy. Lynne finally comes round and forgives Garry after she gets jealous when he has sex with Lynne's sister, Belinda Peacock (Leanne Lakey).

Lynne and Garry reconcile and in 2004, Lynne becomes pregnant and a scan confirms that she is expecting a girl, that they plan to name her Vivienne after Lynne's late mother, Viv (April Martin). However, disaster strikes when a fairground ride collapses in Albert Square and Lynne is trapped under the debris. She survives but suffers severe abdominal pain and Garry is told that Lynne needs an emergency caesarean to save her and the baby. Terrified of losing Lynne and their daughter, Garry agrees but only Lynne survives. The baby is stillborn but Lynne also needed an emergency hysterectomy so she cannot have any more children. When Lynne is told the tragic news, she is devastated and blames Garry for consenting to surgery and cannot even bring herself to look at him. On the day of Vivienne's funeral, Lynne decides that her marriage to Garry is over, feeling that life for her in Walford is simply a reminder of what she has lost. She leaves that day to go and stay with her aunt Jean and her departure leaves Garry a broken man. Lynne's last appearance is in July 2004.

Lynne appears as a child in Kat's flashback sequence in December 2018, and also appears in video footage in October 2025, when Kat and Zoe watch footage from Halloween 1988.

== In popular culture ==
The character of Lynne Hobbs has been spoofed in the cartoon sketch show 2DTV.

Also, impressionist Alistair McGowan has impersonated Lynne working in the cafe, in his comedy show, The Big Impression.
