= Mo Harris =

Fictional character from EastEnders

- EastEnders character
- Laila Morse as Mo Harris (2024)
- Portrayed by: Laila Morse; Lorraine Stanley (2004 flashback)
- Duration: 2000–2016, 2018–2022, 2024–present
- First appearance: Episode 2003; 18 September 2000
- Created by: Tony Jordan
- Introduced by: John Yorke (2000, 2018); Chris Clenshaw (2022, 2024)
- Spin-off appearances: Slaters in Detention (2003); Pat and Mo (2004); EastEnders: E20 (2010); The Point of Mo Return (2024)
In-universe information
- Other names: Mo Porter; Big Mo
- Occupation: Handler of stolen goods Con artist Market stallholder (clothing); Barmaid; Cleaner; Call centre worker
- Family: Slater
- Father: Sidney Porter
- Mother: Joyce Porter
- Brothers: Stan Porter; Colin Porter
- Husband: Jimmy Harris (backstory)
- Sons: Billy Harris
- Daughters: Viv Slater; Jean Harris
- Granddaughters: Lynne Hobbs; Kat Slater; Belinda Peacock; Little Mo Mitchell; Joanne Harris
- Other relatives: Zoe Slater; Freddie Slater; Tommy Moon; Bert Moon; Ernie Moon; Jasmine Fisher; Josh Goodwin

Mo Harris (also Porter, also known as Big Mo), is a fictional character from the BBC soap opera EastEnders, who made her first appearance on 18 September 2000, played by Laila Morse. Mo was also played by Lorraine Stanley in the 2004 spin-off, Pat and Mo, delving into her past with her sister-in-law, Pat Evans (Pam St Clement/Emma Cooke).

Mo is a highly comical character and her tendency for dodgy deals bring much of the show's light entertainment. In July 2012, Morse's contract was not renewed, but she was not immediately written out of the series and continued to make occasional appearances until 21 January 2016. Mo's reintroduction was announced in December 2017 and she returned full-time on 16 March 2018. On 6 February 2021, it was announced that Morse would be leaving the role once again and she departed on 3 June 2021. On 28 June 2022, it was announced that Mo would return for a short stint later in the year. Mo returned on 10 August 2022 and departed on 14 September 2022. On 28 February 2024, it was confirmed that Mo would be making a permanent return to EastEnders alongside her great-grandson Freddie Slater (Bobby Brazier); their return was broadcast on 20 May 2024.

== Development ==
=== Creation, casting and introduction ===
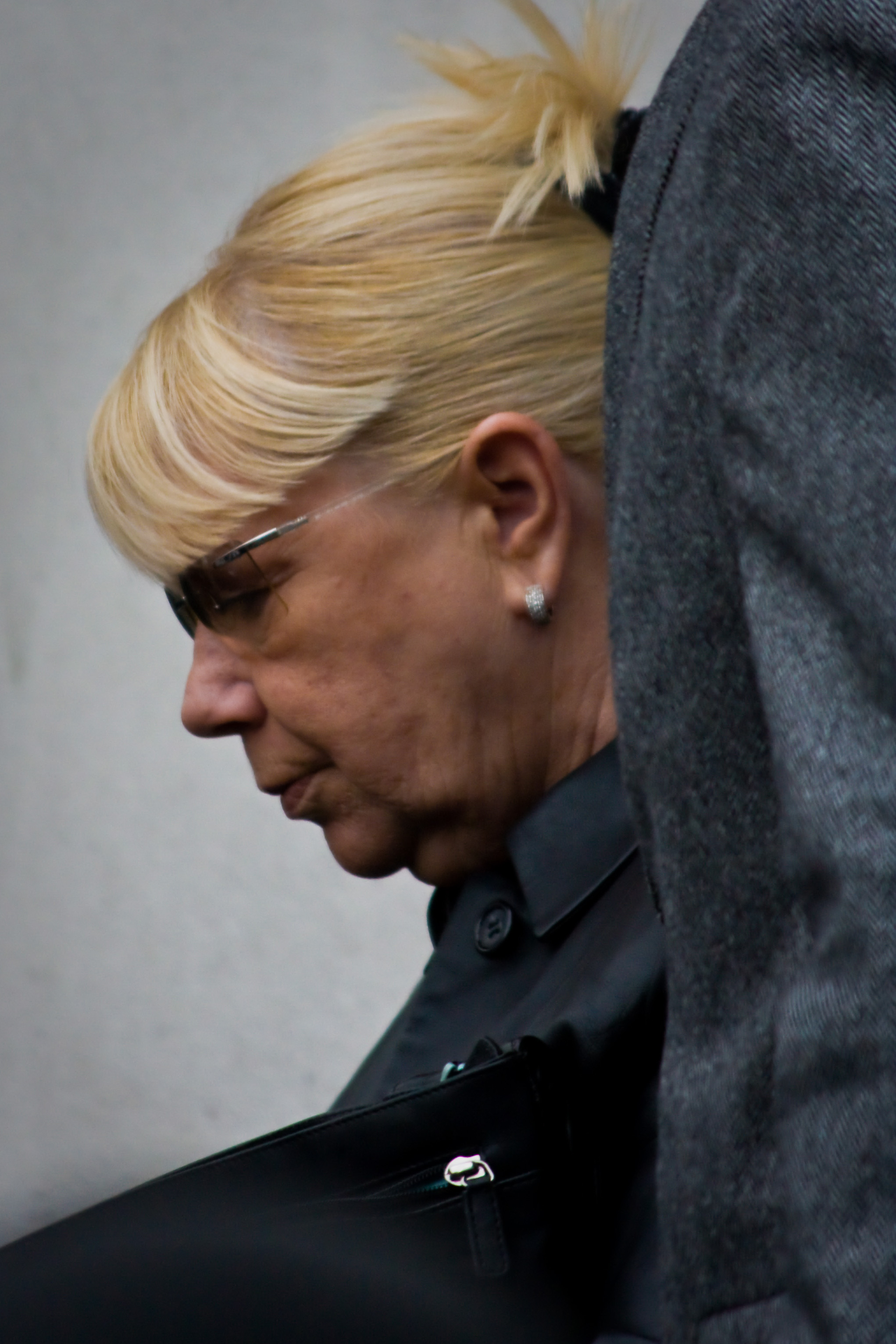
Laila Morse (pictured) was cast as Mo in 2000, when she was named "Arrival of the Year" by TV critic Ian Hyland.

In 2000, EastEnders' executive producer John Yorke decided to introduce the "classic" Slater family. He felt the show needed to go back to its roots and bring back some traditional values. BBC's head of drama, Mal Young commented, "We do not have enough solid families in the soap, there were a lot of fractured families and people who were alone." The family were created as a replacement for the di Marco family, who were axed by Yorke. The family consisted of, grandmother Mo (Laila Morse), father Charlie Slater (Derek Martin), his four children, Lynne Slater (Elaine Lordan), Kat Slater (Jessie Wallace), Little Mo Morgan (Kacey Ainsworth), Zoe Slater (Michelle Ryan), as well as Lynne's boyfriend Garry Hobbs (Ricky Groves).

The character of Mo and the rest of the Slater family were created during workshops with Tony Jordan and John Yorke. London actors were invited to improvise in groups, and the characters were created during these improvisations. Laila Morse was cast as Mo, and made her first on-screen appearance on 18 September 2000. She was named "Arrival of the Year" by TV critic Ian Hyland in 2000.

=== Characterisation ===
Mo has been described as "a very strong person [who] loves the family [and] wouldn't have anything said about them" by Morse. She has been said to "hold the family together ... [acting] as a surrogate mum to her granddaughters". Her criminal activity has led to her being described as a "female Fagin or Del Boy" and the "queen of knock-off". Mo has also been described as a "tough cookie" and a "fighter". Another writer from The People said that Mo is "tough-talking".

She's come a cropper with the coppers over tax evasion but she shows no inclination to go straight. Mo loves a gossip, she's always up for a knees-up and never one to turn down a drink at the Vic... especially if someone else is paying. As the elder stateswoman of the Slater family, she's had her fair share of battles and she'll fight to the death to defend her girls. She's hard as nails and doesn't suffer fools gladly. Unless they cross her palm with silver – or any form of currency really.

— A description of Mo Harris from the BBC (2012)

=== Feud with Pat Evans ===
Mo's main link to Albert Square, before her arrival, was her former sister-in-law Pat Butcher (Pam St Clement). There is animosity between the two as Pat believes that Mo cheated on her late brother, Jimmy Harris (Alex King) and still holds a grudge. On Mo's return to the square, she stokes the flames on her long-running argument with Pat, which began three decades earlier. Their backstory was further elaborated on in the spin off Soap "Bubble" Pat and Mo, set in the 1960s featuring a teenage Pat and Mo, played by Emma Cooke and Lorraine Stanley, respectively.

=== Departure and guest appearances (2012–2016) ===
Morse's contract was not renewed in July 2012, but she was not immediately written out of the series and continued to make occasional appearances. Mo made her final appearance on 21 January 2016, but Morse said in June 2017 that she had never officially left the cast, saying, "All of a sudden my character disappeared and I wasn't in it any more, but I've never officially left the show—I've never had a leaving party or a present. I hope Big Mo comes back. I like all the cast, they're lovely people, so it would be good to film with them again."

=== Reintroduction (2018) ===
On 20 December 2017, it was announced that Morse would reprise the role in early 2018. Mo's reintroduction was announced alongside that of Kat Slater (Wallace) and Jean Slater (Wright). Morse expressed her joy at returning and stated that fans would regularly ask about Mo. She commented, "I can't wait to see everyone and get stuck back into life in Walford." Yorke, who returned as the show's executive consultant in 2017, called the Slater family "one of the all-time great families in EastEnders" and opined that the show is very different without them. On their reintroduction, Yorke commented, "It has been a real joy to find a way to bring them back together and we're incredibly excited about where we are taking them next." Yorke also revealed that new Slater family members would be introduced too.

On 6 February 2021, it was announced that Morse would be departing from the role of Mo again. Her departure was aired on 3 June 2021.

=== Subsequent returns ===
On 28 June 2022, it was announced that Mo would return for a short stint later in the summer. Mo returned on 10 August 2022 and departed on 14 September 2022, when she returned home to Essex. It was announced on 28 February 2024 that Mo would return full time to the soap in the Spring alongside her great-grandson Freddie (Bobby Brazier).

== Storylines ==
=== 2000–2016 ===
Mo, who previously lived in Walford, returns there after almost forty years away, with her son-in-law, Charlie Slater (Derek Martin) and granddaughters, Lynne Slater (Elaine Lordan), Kat Slater (Jessie Wallace), Little Mo Morgan (Kacey Ainsworth) and Zoe Slater (Michelle Ryan), although Zoe is later revealed to be Kat's secret daughter, making her Mo's great-granddaughter. Mo's rivalry with her former best friend Pat Evans (Pam St Clement) arises, but they reconcile at the grave of Mo's former husband and Pat's brother, Jimmy Harris (Alex King). Much of Mo's time is spent selling poor quality stolen goods and she trades with Fat Elvis (Shenton Dixon). She is assisted by Mickey (Joe Swash) and Darren Miller (Charlie G. Hawkins) and for a while sets up a sex chatline. She also works with Charlie's great-niece Stacey Slater (Lacey Turner) on her market stall, selling clothes, and Stacey begins referring to Mo as her grandmother. She has a brief relationship with Bert Atkinson (Dave Hill), but ends it because Bert is also seeing her friend, Ina Foot (Ina Clare). They reconcile, but break up again when Bert's ex-wife, Evie Brown (Marji Campi), arrives in Walford, terminally ill. Mo begins selling cigarettes that she bought in Spain and two of her customers turn out to be Revenue and Customs officers. She is sentenced to 100 hours of community service, for tax evasion. After Stacey marries Bradley Branning (Charlie Clements), Mo tries to sell their wedding gifts.

Mo sees Charlie's partner, Brenda Boyle (Carmel Cryan), embracing another man at the tube station, but the man is Brenda's brother, Clive Robinson (Col Farrel). Brenda reveals to Mo that she is moving to Madeira with her family and Mo convinces Charlie not to let her go. However, Brenda and Charlie leave together, leaving Mo devastated. She begins drinking heavily and protests against the sale of Charlie's taxi. Charlie returns to Walford with a woman called Orlenda (Mary Tamm), but Mo does not trust her. Orlenda leaves, after admitting she was scamming Charlie but returns his money. Mo takes charge of a children's nativity play but fails to keep the children under control. In a raffle, she wins Max Branning's (Jake Wood) car, but sells it, to Max's dismay. When Archie Mitchell (Larry Lamb) is murdered (see Who Killed Archie?), Mo starts a betting circle on who killed him. She runs when she sees a police officer, but later, another officer appears behind her and she asks him if he wants to place a bet. She goes on holiday to Spain with Fat Elvis and when she returns, she is surprised to discover that Bradley is dead. Mo attempts to sell Lucas Johnson's (Don Gilet) bibles to the public, as gruesome souvenirs of the killer. Her insensitivity gets her thrown out of The Queen Victoria public house. Mo receives a phone call from Kat, who wants Zoe's birth certificate. Mo meets Kat at a café and gives her the certificate. Kat admits to Mo that she conned a man and needs a new identity. Kat also lies to Mo, claiming that her husband, Alfie Moon (Shane Richie), is dead. Mo persuades Kat to come home and Kat reluctantly agrees, but when they get home, men are waiting for Kat and her money. However, Alfie sends them away. Mo is shocked to learn that Kat is pregnant and Alfie is not the father. When Kat goes into labour, Mo delivers her son, Tommy Moon, on the floor of The Queen Vic's barrel store. On the same day, Ronnie Branning (Samantha Womack) gives birth to a baby boy, James Branning. On New Year's Eve, Ronnie finds that James has died and she swaps him with Tommy. Alfie and the family find the deceased baby and believe it is Tommy.

After Kat blames Charlie for Tommy's death, Charlie decides to go and live with Lynne, despite Mo begging him not to go. Left living alone, Mo asks Kat if she can move into The Queen Vic and let No. 23. Kat refuses initially but later agrees when Mo reminds her that she never complained about living with Kat's bad habits. Mo continues with her dodgy deals while staying at the pub, including persuading Stacey's mother, Jean Slater (Gillian Wright) to serve "turkey" for pub lunches, which turns out to be swan meat. When a benefit fraud officer declares that Jean has been illegally claiming benefits while working at the pub, Mo admits to Jean and Kat that she has been claiming benefits in Jean's name. Jean agrees to take the blame, as Mo has previous convictions. When Mo learns that her old enemy, Pat, is terminally ill, she visits her in hospital and they end their long-standing feud. When Pat later dies, Mo returns Pat's Miss Butlin's sash, that she stole years ago, out of jealousy. When Mo learns that Charlie has suffered a stroke, she leaves Walford to look after him. Several months later, Jean visits them and Mo returns to The Queen Vic when she believes that Jean is hiding something from her. Her suspicions are confirmed, when she discovers that Alfie is allowing Roxy Mitchell (Rita Simons) to stay in The Queen Vic. Mo continues to disapprove of Roxy's presence in The Queen Vic, after Kat and Alfie split up. It is later revealed that Mo has rented a villa in Devon, owned by "a mate".

Mo returns to collect rent from Kat, Michael Moon (Steve John Shepherd) and Alice Branning (Jasmyn Banks). She demands Alice pays by the end of the day, or she will evict her. Kat later convinces Mo to give up her keys to the house. Three months later, Jean discovers that Mo is stealing vegetables from the Walford allotments and Mo convinces Jean's new partner, Ollie Walters (Tony O'Callaghan), a police officer whom Mo knows, not to report her, as she is Jean's family. At Christmas, Mo and Charlie visit Walford, where it is revealed that Kat is pregnant with twins. Two months later, Alfie calls Mo, after dealing with some serious family issues, raised by the re-appearance of Stacey after a four-year absence, to which Mo plans to spend more time in Walford to support her family. Mo is delighted when Kat and Alfie's twins, Bert and Ernie Moon (Freddie and Stanley Beale), are born, but the family's joy is cut short when a fire starts at their house and when it reaches a supply of knock-off hairspray, which Mo had intended to sell, a huge explosion destroys everything that they own. Kat is badly injured and Mo is wracked with guilt, briefly moving in with Masood Ahmed (Nitin Ganatra), before taking an extended holiday in Lanzarote with Charlie.

Mo returns to Albert Square and is shocked to discover that Alfie and Kat have, once again, separated and that her family are financially struggling. Mo reveals to a destitute Kat that she inherited money from her deceased uncle, Harry Slater (Michael Elphick), who had raped her as a child, impregnating her with Zoe. Kat turns the money down, so Mo secretly has the money transferred to her own account, pretending to be Kat. When Kat discovers this, she is livid and burns the money in the street. Kat and Alfie reconcile and after winning the jackpot on a scratch card, plan to move to Tenerife. At their leaving party, Mo shows a stunned Kat an engagement ring, revealing that she has accepted a marriage proposal from her long-time business associate and romantic interest, Fat Elvis. Shortly after Kat and Alfie's departure, Mo and Fat Elvis leave for Greece. When Mo returns alongside Charlie, she reveals that Fat Elvis has left her. When Kat learns she had also given birth to a boy along with Zoe, she realises that Mo knew about the secret, so angrily demands the truth from her. During the argument with Mo that ensues, Charlie suffers a heart attack in front of Mo, Stacey and Kat. After suffering from a cardiac arrest, Charlie dies, which devastates the family. After attending Charlie's funeral, Mo moves to Kent to live with her other granddaughter, Belinda Peacock (Carli Norris), as Kat cannot forgive her for having her son adopted. When Belinda moves to Walford after her marriage ends, Mo's whereabouts are not mentioned.

=== 2018–2022 ===
Mo returns to Walford, telling Stacey that Kat has died. They raise funds for Kat's funeral, while Mo avoids answering her phone or the door. A coffin is donated and Mo calls Fat Elvis saying she has a coffin for sale. Jean later arrives, saying that Kat is very much alive. Stacey demands the truth from Mo and threatens to call Lynne or Little Mo to clarify if Kat is dead at all. It then emerges that Mo lied to raise money as she has financial troubles following a dispute with a mob. Kat suddenly returns to Walford in a cab and is confused that The Queen Vic is holding a benefit night in memory of her and she is annoyed with Mo when she learns the truth, but is forced to hide in a cupboard when Ian visits with the raised money. Annie Pritchard (Martha Howe-Douglas), the daughter of Terry, who Mo conned, arrives on the Slaters doorstep demanding her father's money back, but the family fool her into believing Mo has died and they offer to pay the money. Kat, Stacey and Mo arrive at The Queen Vic and attempt to maintain that Mo made a mistake; Mo then fakes a heart attack, the residents think the Slaters are conwomen and a bar fight soon starts. The family find out that Mo took £300 of the money and when they go to return it to Mick Carter (Danny Dyer), Mo sneaks off and encounters Annie, who injures Mo. Jean repays the money back in full, and Stacey tells Mo she must stay in Walford until she pays Jean back. Mo claims to have psychic abilities as a trick to make money but in reality, she is listening into people's conversations with recording devices. Kat starts a cleaning business with Jean and Stacey, and Mo is forced to join them, but she does not work hard and steals from the employers.

In January 2019, Mo uses her great-grandson Tommy (Shay Crotty) for a money making scheme, but she ends up losing Tommy in the process. He is found by Martin Fowler (James Bye), but fed up with her scheming, Kat and Stacey decide to trick Mo by claiming that Tommy has been missing all day. Not long after, Kush Kazemi (Davood Ghadami) joins Mo to make quick money. After stealing some of Kat's money, Mo double crosses Kush, but he catches her in the act. Furious, Stacey throws Mo out, and she moves in with Kush. Mo gives Kush a batch of fur coats that he can sell on the market. When Bex Fowler (Jasmine Armfield) hears about fur coats that were recently stolen, she tells Kush and he throws Mo out. However Mo proves that her coats are real, and Kush allows her to live with him.

When Kat and Stacey feud over Kush (now Kat’s boyfriend) going for custody of his and Stacey’s son Arthur Fowler, Mo lies that Jean’s cancer has worsened so they can reunite. However her plan backfires. Mo later moves back in with the Slaters, but ignores eviction letters. The Panesar family decide to buy the house, but they later agree to rent it to the Slaters.

In June 2021, Mo reveals that Fat Elvis has invited her to join him on a cruise. She turns it down after becoming worried about Jean’s behaviour, but Jean convinces Mo to go. Mo behaves shifty as a police car pulls up on the Square, and it is revealed that she has been growing a cannabis farm in the Slaters’ garage. Before she leaves, Mo asks Jean to look after it. In August 2022, Stacey, Martin and her children visit Mo in her caravan park in Essex, where she is staying with Jean. The following month, Mo returns to Walford for Kat's wedding to Phil Mitchell (Steve McFadden).

=== 2024–present ===
In May 2024, Mo follows her great-grandson Freddie Slater (Bobby Brazier) to Walford and moves in with Kat. Mo flirts with Stevie Mitchell (Alan Ford) and they begin a brief relationship which ends when Stevie leaves Walford, upsetting Mo. When Bridge Street Market is on the verge of closing, Mo comes up with a money-making scheme as a way to help the market traders, whose livelihoods are under threat by plans to redevelop Bridge Street and the Square Gardens. Mo teams up with Kim Fox (Tameka Empson) and Stevie's daughter-in-law Nicola Mitchell (Laura Doddington) to make an adult calendar of the men of Walford. Her former friend Mickey Miller returns and helps Mo and Kim take photos, and also agrees to be in the calendar. Mo joins Kim on a true crime tour of Sonia Fowler's (Natalie Cassidy) house after her deceased boyfriend Reiss Colwell (Jonny Freeman) is revealed to have murdered his wife Debbie (Jenny Meier) for her life insurance money to pay for his and Sonia's IVF. They follow Sonia and Bianca, causing Bianca to have a panic attack. In June 2025, Mo officiates Kat and Alfie's non-legally binding wedding ceremony. In July 2025, Stacey gives Kat a loan to buy The Queen Vic from Linda Carter (Kellie Bright) and her mother Elaine Peacock (Harriet Thorpe). Mo moves in but gets arrested during the moving-in party for being drunk and disorderly. In September, Mo is reunited with Zoe after 20 years when she returns to Walford. She later goes to stay with Lynne to help her recover from leg surgery. In April 2026, Mo's great-great-granddaughter Jasmine Fisher (Indeyarna Donaldson-Holness) throws her a belated 90th birthday party. Mo is left devastated when Zoe suddenly dies from a head injury in September 2026.

== Other appearances ==
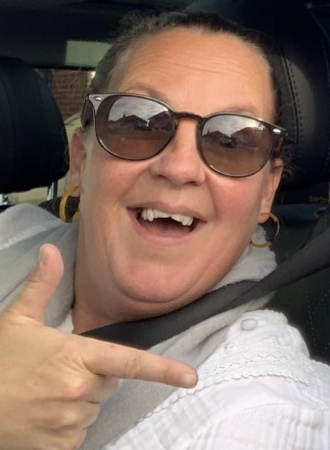
Lorraine Stanley (pictured) played a younger Mo in EastEnders: Pat and Mo, a spin-off created to give viewers an "understanding of, and history to [Mo and Pat Butcher]".

The character of Mo appears in two spin-offs of EastEnders. She features in the 2004 'soap bubble' EastEnders: Pat and Mo, which explores her past with Pat through flashbacks, in which she is played by Lorraine Stanley. The episode was broadcast to give the viewer "and understanding of, and history to [the] characters". The episode is partly set in the 1950s and explains Pat and Mo's dislike for each other. A show source said, "When the Slaters arrived in the square three years ago, Pat was horrified. Now the time has come for them to bury the hatchet—or at least try to." Mo also appears in the straight-to-video spin-off EastEnders: Slaters in Detention in 2003, and in the 2010 internet spin-off EastEnders: E20.

== Reception ==
For her role as Mo, Morse was longlisted for "Best Comic Performance" at the 2024 Inside Soap Awards.

Mo has been described by Ian Hyland from the Sunday Mirror as a "battleaxe" and a woman "with a face like a bulldog chewing a whole nest of wasps and a mouth like a foghorn in the Grand Canyon, she's the only woman I've ever seen who makes Fat Pat look demure." He added that "This time they've bought finest East End. Every time Mo, the granny, opens her mouth I think jellied eels are going to fly out." Another writer for the Sunday Mirror, Paul Scott said: "As Big Mo Slater she is the battleaxe from Hell whose tongue-lashings have even the hardest of Walford's hard cases running for cover." Charlie Catchpole from the Daily Mirror said of Mo's arrival: "I'm sure, that no sooner does a Romanian weightlifter go missing from the Olympics than Mighty Mo Harris arrives in Albert Square." John Russell from The People called Mo a "motormouth". In 2020, Sara Wallis and Ian Hyland from The Daily Mirror placed Mo 39th on their ranked list of the Best EastEnders characters of all time, calling her a "salt-of-the-earth Cockney chancer" who can "always be relied on for a laugh, involving an anecdote about her lover Fat Elvis".

== See also ==
- List of soap opera villains
- List of EastEnders characters (2000)
- List of EastEnders: E20 characters
