= Lillia Turner =

English actress (born 2009)

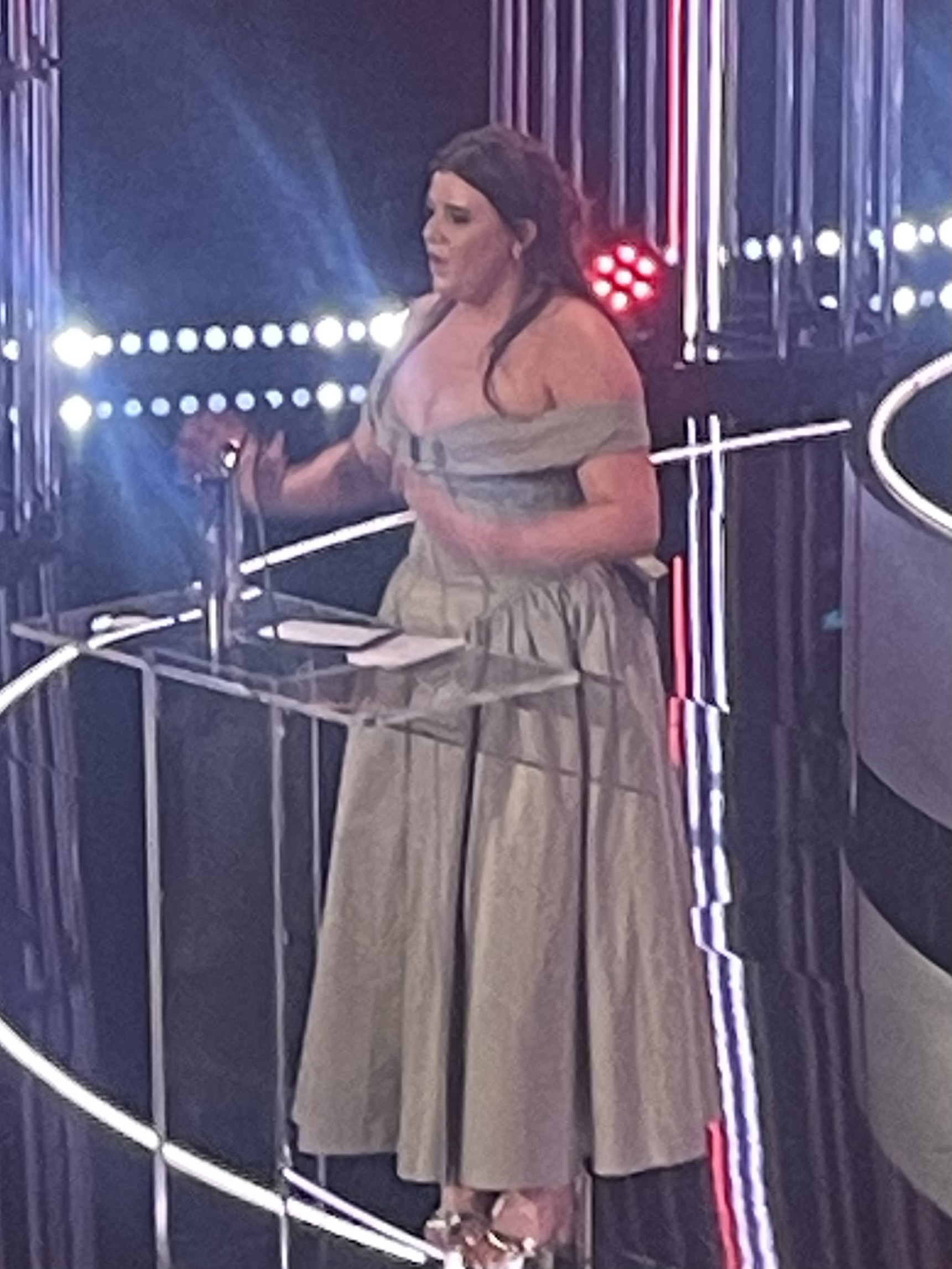
- Turner in 2025
- Born: 16 March 2009 (age 17); London, England
- Occupation: Actress
- Years active: 2019–present
- Television: EastEnders

Lillia Turner (born 16 March 2009) is an English actress, known for portraying the role of Lily Slater on the BBC soap opera EastEnders since 2020. Her most notable storyline includes when her character was placed at the centre of a teenage pregnancy and received both positive and critical opinions. For her portrayal, Turner was nominated for a National Television Award and won the award for Best Young Performer at the 2023 British Soap Awards.

== Early life ==
Turner was born on 16 March 2009 in London, England.

== Career ==
In January 2019, Turner made her acting debut in the BBC soap opera EastEnders as Alyssa, a friend of Bailey Baker (Kara-Leah Fernandes) who is also a member of a children's football team coached by Mick Carter (Danny Dyer) and Mitch Baker (Roger Griffiths), who wants to play up front because she says her grandmother has died. She made a further appearance as Alyssa in April, when she is re-introduced as the sister of Brooke (Ria Lopez), a love interest of Bernadette Taylor (Clair Norris).

In September 2020, Turner returned to EastEnders and was cast in the regular role of Lily Slater, taking over the role from Aine Garvey, who had played the character for five years. Her first scenes as Lily aired on 21 September when the character returns alongside her mother, Stacey Slater (Lacey Turner). In January 2023, Turner's character was placed at the centre of an adolescent pregnancy storyline when it is revealed that a 12-year-old Lily has become pregnant. For her portrayal of Lily, she won the award for Best Young Performer at the 2023 British Soap Awards. Later that year, she was nominated in the same category at the Inside Soap Awards and was longlisted for the award for Serial Drama Performance at the 28th National Television Awards.

== Filmography ==
Year	Title	Role	Notes	Ref.
2019	EastEnders	Alyssa	2 episodes	
2020–present	EastEnders	Lily Slater	Regular role	

== Awards and nominations ==
Year	Ceremony	Award	Work	Result	Ref.
2022	Inside Soap Awards	Best Young Performer	EastEnders	Shortlisted	
2023	2023 British Soap Awards	Best Young Performer	EastEnders	Won	
2023	28th National Television Awards	Serial Drama Performance	EastEnders	Longlisted	
2023	Inside Soap Awards	Best Young Performer	EastEnders	Nominated	
2023	TVTimes Awards	Favourite Young Actor	EastEnders	Won	
2024	TVTimes Awards	Favourite Young Performer	EastEnders	Won	
