= Leanne Lakey =

British actress (born 1978)

- Born: 19 May 1978 (age 47); Chelmsford, Essex, England
- Occupation: Actress
- Years active: 1999–present

Leanne Lakey (born 19 May 1978) is a British actress, best known for playing Belinda Peacock in EastEnders (2001–2003) and Charlotte Day in Family Affairs (2002).

== Background ==
Lakey originally trained to be a dancer, and is accomplished at jazz, ballroom and ballet. She used to play netball for Essex, and considered playing for England.

Lakey studied Dance at the Essex Dance Theatre and went on to train at Arts Educational Schools in Chiswick.

== Career ==
Lakey's first professional acting role was a cameo in the television film The Last Musketeer.

During 2002 she appeared in both EastEnders and Family Affairs at the same time, becoming one of the first actors to do so. Discussing the experience, she said:

"I find I'm under more pressure at Family Affairs, as it's regular. The work schedule at FA is very hard. I'm up at 4.30 every morning and I'm lucky to get home before 9 or 10pm so it's difficult...the main difference is celebrities and fame. On EE they're all household names and they all have their own problems, but the actors on Family Affairs aren't as well known. EE is like a holiday, I get to catch up with everybody which is great. It's very relaxed, whereas Family Affairs, the schedule is so tight it's too quick."

Lakey has also appeared in episodes of Ashes to Ashes, New Tricks, Casualty and The Bill.

In January 2016, actress (Carli Norris) became the second actress to play Belinda Peacock, replacing Lakey.

== Filmography ==
Year	Title	Role	Notes
2000	The Last Musketeer	Angie Salter	Television film
2000	London's Burning	Police Constable: Episode 12.11 (2000)	TV series
2001	The Vice	Debbie: Out of Mind (2001)	Feature film
2001	The Bill	Karen: Temptation (2001)	Police drama
2001	EastEnders	Belinda Peacock: (2001–2003)	Soap opera
2002	Family Affairs	Charlotte Day	Soap opera
2003	EastEnders: Slaters in Detention	Belinda Peacock	Special episode released on DVD and VHS
2003	The Bill	Julie Lewis: Episode 142 (2003)	Police drama
2005	The Bill	Janine Bowker: Episode 365 (2005)	Police drama
2006	Casualty	Lauren Dunsford: Poisoned Love (2006)	Medical drama
2006	New Tricks	Karen: Dockers (2006)	Police drama
2007	Wire in the Blood	May Barrett: The Names of Angels (2007)	TV series
2008	Ashes to Ashes	Street Girl 1: Episode 1.3 (2008)	TV series
2008	The Children	DC Morton: Episode 1 & Episode 2 (2008)	Police drama
2010	Holby City	Erica O'Hanlon: series 13 Episode 6 – Betrayal (2010)	Medical drama
2011	Big Fat Gypsy Gangster	Bev (2011)	Comedy Film
