= Elaine Lordan =

English actress (born 1966)

- Born: Elaine Bernadette Lordan; 8 August 1966 (age 60); Islington, London, England
- Occupation: Actress
- Years active: 1983–2008
- Spouse: Peter Manuel (m. 2005)
- Children: 1

Elaine Bernadette Lordan (born 8 August 1966) is an English retired actress, best known for her role as 'Sugar Walls' in the comedy series Gimme Gimme Gimme and playing Lynne Hobbs in EastEnders (2000–2004). Following several tragedies in her private life, Lordan withdrew from the public eye in 2008.

== Career ==
Lordan is best known for her role as Lynne Hobbs in the BBC soap opera EastEnders, which she appeared in from 2000 until 2004. Following reports of drunken behaviour on and off the set, Lordan left the show in mid-2004. Before landing the role of Lynne Hobbs in EastEnders, Lordan worked as an aerobics instructor for 10 years. In the early 80s, she appeared in the Grange Hill spin off series Tucker's Luck alongside future EastEnders co-star Todd Carty. She played Tucker's girlfriend Michelle Passmore. She also appeared in TV comedy drama Minder as Trish, a despatcher, Gimme Gimme Gimme as Linda La Hughes's Eurovision-singing sister Sugar Walls in two episodes (1999: credited as Elaine Morgan, 2000).

She appeared on the fifth series of I'm a Celebrity...Get Me Out of Here! in November 2005, but within a day of arriving she passed out twice in the camp, and although the doctors found her to be in good health, she was removed from the jungle, the producers noting they had to consider if they felt the contestants were up to the rigors of the show. She was the first person to be voted off the 2007 series of Soapstar Superstar after performing Bonnie Tyler's "It's a Heartache".

== Personal life ==
She married Peter Manuel in December 2005, and her baby son died a few days later, aged one, having had surgery for a diaphragmatic hernia. This tragedy came just nine months after the suicide of her mother Bernie. She became pregnant again in 2007 but suffered a miscarriage. In April 2008, her father died from a degenerative illness.

She wrote about this part of her life in the book Whatever It Takes: A Story of Family Survival, published in 2008.

== Filmography ==
Year	Show	Role	
1983	Tucker's Luck	Michelle Passmore	
1983	Dramarama	Patsy Locke	Episode: "Rip It Up"
1984	Miracles Take Longer	Mandy Anderson	
1984	Play for Today	Stella	Episode: "The Amazing Miss Stella Estelle"
1984	The Gentle Touch	Tracy Oates	Episode: "Do It Yourself"
1984	Big Deal	Maureen	Episode: "Nine Bob Notes"; Episode: "Video Man"; Episode: "Some You Win..."
1985	Mrs Capper's Birthday	Soldier's Girlfriend	Television film
1986	The Best Years of Your Life	Nurse	Television film
1986	Brush Strokes	Girl with message	Debut episode
1987	Mister Corbett's Ghost	Villager	Television film
1993	Minder	Trish	Episode: "Uneasy Rider"
1993	Casualty	Janice Bradley	Series 7, Episode 23, Cause for Concern
1995	Prime Suspect	Tracy	Series 4, episode 3
1995	The Bill	Jill Evans	Series 13, episode 31 Confidence
1996	Game On	Julia	
1997	Face	Sally	
1998	Dangerfield	Cathy	Episode: "The Long Weekend"
1999	This Year's Love	Kate	Credited as Elaine Lourdan
1999–2000	Gimme Gimme Gimme	Sugar Walls	Episode: "Do They Take Sugar?" (1999); Episode: "Teacher's Pet" (2000)
2000	Offending Angels	Baggy's Ex 4	
2000–2004	EastEnders	Lynne Hobbs	410 episodes
2003	Slaters in Detention	Lynne Hobbs	DVD tie in
2005	I'm a Celebrity...Get Me Out of Here!	Herself	Entered and exited on day one
2007	Soapstar Superstar	Herself	First person to be voted off
