= Sugarhouse (film) =

- Promotional movie poster
- Directed by: Gary Love
- Written by: Dominic Leyton
- Produced by: Rachel Connors; Arvind David; Arvind Ethan David; Ben Dixon; Matthew Justice; Oliver Milburn; Michael Riley
- Starring: Andy Serkis; Ashley Walters; Steven Mackintosh; Adam Deacon
- Cinematography: Daniel Bronks
- Edited by: Chris Gill
- Music by: Michael Price
- Distributed by: Slingshot Studios
- Release date: 24 August 2007
- Running time: 90 minutes
- Country: United Kingdom
- Language: English
- Budget: £250,000

Sugarhouse is a British urban thriller film directed by Gary Love and starring Steven Mackintosh, Ashley Walters, Andy Serkis and Adam Deacon. The low-budget thriller is based on the stage play Collision. The film was released on 24 August 2007.

== Plot ==
Tom (Steven Mackintosh), a middle class working employee, finds himself at rock bottom after he loses his job and his girlfriend in the same week. Believing that he has no choice but to end it all, Tom ventures into a derelict squat in East London, in an attempt to purchase a gun from homeless crack addict D (Ashley Walters). However, D attempts to extort more than the agreed price, in order to pay off his debt to local drug dealer Hoodwink (Andy Serkis), to whom he owes a significant amount of money. However, the gun is not his to sell - it actually belongs to Hoodwink, who will do anything in his power to get it back. Tom's attempts to reason with Hoodwink leave him with more trouble than he bargained for - and trying to buy him off only gets him seriously abused. Despite trying unsuccessfully to shift the blame onto not-so-macho drug dealer Ray (Adam Deacon), Tom and D gradually get to know what makes each other tick - and digress for reasonable life - as they try to find a way out of the situation. However, with Hoodwink still on the warpath, the day soon becomes a cat and mouse game of survival for the pair.

== Cast ==
- Steven Mackintosh as Tom
- Ashley Walters as D
- Andy Serkis as Hoodwink
- Adam Deacon as Ray
- Tolga Safer as Sef
- Ade as Paul
- Sharon D. Clarke as Crystal
- Steven Robertson as Chris, the pinhead leader
- Tracy Whitwell as Tanya, the pregnant girl

== Reception ==
The film was poorly reviewed, with Rotten Tomatoes giving it a "rotten" 29%, based on 18 critics (as of January 2013).
