= Tolga Safer =

British actor

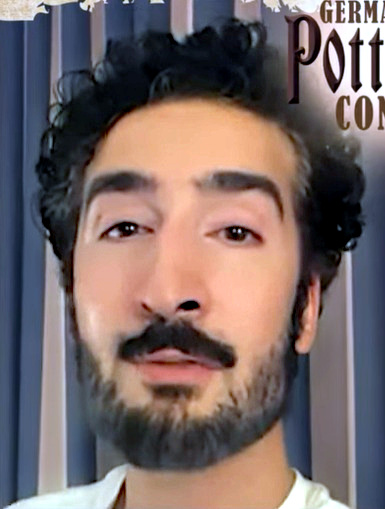
- Safer at German Potter Con 2025
- Born: 26 June 1982 (age 44); London, UK
- Occupation: Actor
- Years active: 2002–present

Tolga Safer (born 26 June 1982) is a British actor who is known for playing Igor Karkaroff's aide in the movie version of Harry Potter and the Goblet of Fire.

== Life and career ==
Safer was born in London, to Turkish Cypriot parents. He started acting at the age of 7 in school plays and attended classes at the Sylvia Young Theatre School. Safer has appeared in various TV commercials for Pepsi, Korres and The Red Cross (directed by Peter Webber). He has appeared in several TV episodes of BBC's Casualty and Doctors. His first main role was in the film Culture Menace which was a British independent movie before working on Harry Potter and the Goblet of Fire in a role created especially for him. Other notable film credits include Sugarhouse alongside Andy Serkis and Ashley Walters and Shoot on Sight. In 2017, Safer appeared alongside Dylan O'Brien in CBS Films' thriller American Assassin.

At the Arcola Theatre, Safer performed in the controversial play 'Bintou' and then on 'Venezuela'. As well as the Arcola Theatre, Tolga Safer has also performed in plays such as Prayer Room at the Birmingham Repertory Theatre. and appeared at The Royal National Theatre.

== Filmography ==
Year	Title	Role	Notes
2004	Get the Picture	Militia	
2004	Cultural Menace	Timur	
2005	Harry Potter and the Goblet of Fire	Karkaroff's Aide	
2006	Doctors	Ahmet Gul	TV series (one episode: "Flying Feathers")
2007	Casualty	Wayne Pitt / Michael Canakis	TV series (two episode: "A Dangerous Initiative" and "Day One")
2007	Sugarhouse	Sef	
2008	Shoot on Sight	Aziz	
2013	Desert Dancer	Stephano	
2014-15	Spotless	Hakan	
2017	American Assassin	Kamil, Sharif's Assistant	
2017	Britannia	Aziz	
2023	Vikings: Valhalla	Kurya	Recurring role in Season 2

== Theatre ==
Year	Theatre	Play	Role
2002	Arcola Theatre	Bintou	Kelkhal
2003	Arcola Theatre	Venezuela	Izmir
2005	The Birmingham Rep	Prayer Room	Brother Kazi
2006	Royal National Theatre	Invisible Mountains	Taylan
