= William Ellis (actor) =

British actor, voice artist and podcaster

- Born: William Henry Ellis; Camden, London, England
- Education: Royal Holloway University; London Academy of Music and Dramatic Art
- Occupation: Actor
- Spouse: Alice Ellis (m. 2021)
- Children: 1

William Henry Ellis is an English actor, voice artist and podcaster known for Great Expectations, Dragon Quest Swords, Queen of the Desert, Parade's End, The Courageous Heart of Irena Sendler and EastEnders

== Early life and education ==
Ellis is the son of Chris and Becky Ellis. He has two siblings, Adam Ellis and Laura Martin.

Ellis trained at London Academy of Music and Dramatic Art (LAMDA).

== Career ==
=== Theatre ===
After graduating from LAMDA in 2005, Ellis starred in British-Asian writer Shan Khan's play Prayer Room at Birmingham Repertory Theatre directed by Angus Jackson. Ellis played Griffin, the self-righteous Christian group leader. Charles Spencer in The Daily Telegraph wrote "William Ellis memorably nails the condescending certainty of charismatic Christianity". Ellis then went on to play Benvolio in the Nuffield Theatre production of Romeo and Juliet that toured Barbados as part of Holder's Season in 2006. In 2007 he worked with the director Peter Gill at The Royal National Theatre on his production of The Voysey Inheritance. After a UK tour playing Simon Bliss in Peter Hall's production of Hay Fever in 2008, he returned to work with Peter Gill again, as Algernon Moncreiff for his production of The Importance of Being Earnest. The play was performed at Vaudeville Theatre in London's West End. The play received a positive reception and Ellis's performance was described by The Hollywood Reporter as "...having flair".

Following The Importance of Being Earnest he appeared as Sam Leadbitter in Theatre Royal, Bath's production of This Happy Breed and also played Prince Charming in Lyric Theatre's Cinderella. In 2015 Ellis starred alongside Olivia Poulet, playing Uncle Peck in Paula Vogel's play How I Learned to Drive at Southwark Playhouse. Ellis's performance as the predatory uncle was described positively by The Evening Standard reviewer Henry Hitchings: "William Ellis captures the discreet, almost courtly manner in which Peck wields his needy brand of destructiveness".

In 2019, Ellis starred in Frederick Knott's Dial M for Murder, playing the murdering ex-tennis player Tony Wendice at the New Vic Theatre. The play received positive reviews.

=== Film and television ===
Ellis began acting on screen in 2006 with small parts and in 2009 he portrayed Wiktor in The Courageous Heart of Irena Sendler. In 2012 he took on the part of Compeyson in Mike Newell's Great Expectations and in 2015, he played The Earl of Chester in Queen of the Desert, directed by Werner Herzog. Further significant credits have included Parade's End, Father Brown, 24: Live Another Day and The Crown. In 2023 he joined the cast of the BBC soap opera EastEnders, playing Theo Hawthorne, the former teacher of Freddie Slater (Bobby Brazier), a part for which Ellis was nominated for "Best Villain" at the Inside Soap Awards 2023.

=== Voice over ===
Ellis has voiced a number of British commercials and was the voice of Toyota for its 2012 Paris Motor Show event: Stories of Better. In 2020 he narrated two self-help books for the life-coach and author Vernon Sankey, The Stairway to Happiness and The Way: Finding Peace in Turbulent Times, which Sankey co-authored with Katey Lockwood.

In 2008 he played the lead character of Anlace for the English language version of Dragon Quest Swords for the Nintendo Wii.

=== Podcast ===
Ellis is the author and producer of the podcast An Open Water Swimmer's Podcast which had its first season in winter 2021. His guests for season one included the marathon swimmer Sarah Thomas.

Ellis also successfully swam around Jersey in 2023, and swam the English Channel in 2024. Raising money for Sussex-based charity AMAZE. In 2026 Ellis swam the 70km of Lake Geneva non-stop in 27 hours and 35 minutes and raised money for a local Special Educational Needs school.

== Filmography ==
Film
Year	Title	Role	Notes
2009	The Courageous Heart of Irena Sendler	Wiktor	
2009	A Closed Book	Interviewee 2	
2009	Into the Storm	Intelligence Officer	
2012	Great Expectations	Compeyson	
2015	Queen of the Desert	Early of Chester	

Television
Year	Title	Role	Notes
2006	The Amazing Mrs Pritchard	Newsnight Runner	Episode 1.1
2009	Hotel Babylon	Horny Businessman	Episode 4.3
2010	The Bill	Dylan Prest	S26 Ep28
2012	Hustle	Pinstripe 1	S8 Ep6
2012	Thirteen Steps Down	Steve	
2012	Parade's End	Aubrey	Episode 1.5
2013	The Guilty	Malcolm James	Episode 1
2014	24: Live Another Day	Russian Aide	8pm – 9pm
2016	Father Brown	Billy Neville	S4 Ep1
2018	Doctors	Hartley Beddington	S19 EP205
2019	The Crown	Queen's Flight Captain	S3 Ep7
2023	EastEnders	Theo Hawthorne	Regular role
2025	Doctor Who	Prime Minister	Guest, 1 episode (“The Robot Revolution”)

Video Games
Year	Title	Role	Notes
2007	Dragon Quest Swords	Anlace	
2023	Phantom Blade: Executioners	Zuo Shang	
2026	Cat in the Hat: Rainy Day Mayhem	Narrator	

== Stage productions ==
- Prayer Room (2005, as Griffin)
- Romeo and Juliet at Holder's Season Barbados (2006, as Benvolio)
- The Voysey Inheritance (2007, as Dennis Tregonning)
- Hay Fever (2008, as Simon Bliss)
- The Importance of Being Earnest (2009, as Algernon Moncrieff)
- This Happy Breed (2011, as Sam Leadbitter)
- Cinderella (2012, as Prince Charming)
- How I Learned to Drive (2015, as Uncle Peck)
- Dial M for Murder (2019, as Tony Wendice)
