= Freddie Slater (EastEnders) =

Fictional character from EastEnders

- EastEnders character
- Bobby Brazier as Freddie Slater (2023)
- Portrayed by: Alex & Tom Kilby (2004–2006); Bobby Brazier (2022–2025)
- Duration: 2004–2006, 2022–2025
- First appearance: Episode 2826; 1 November 2004
- Last appearance: Episode 7234; 2 December 2025
- Introduced by: Louise Berridge (2004); Chris Clenshaw (2022)
- Spin-off appearances: The Point of Mo Return (2024)
In-universe information
- Other names: Freddie Mitchell
- Occupation: Chip shop assistant Food truck vendor
- Family: Slater
- Father: Graham Foster
- Mother: Little Mo Mitchell
- Stepfather: Billy Mitchell
- Half-sisters: Rebecca Foster; Ella Foster
- Grandfathers: Charlie Slater
- Grandmothers: Deirdre Foster; Viv Slater
- Aunts: Lynne Hobbs; Kat Slater; Belinda Peacock
- First cousins: Zoe Slater; Dermott Dolan; Tommy Moon; Bert Moon; Ernie Moon
- Other relatives: Mo Harris; Stacey Slater; Lily Slater; Arthur Fowler; Hope Fowler; Charli Slater

Freddie Slater (also Mitchell) is a fictional character from the BBC soap opera EastEnders, played by twins Alex and Tom Kilby from 2004 to 2006 and Bobby Brazier from 2022 to 2025. Freddie is introduced as the son of Little Mo Mitchell (Kacey Ainsworth), conceived after she is raped by Graham Foster (Alex McSweeney), and makes his first appearance in episode 2826, broadcast on 1 November 2004. He departs with Little Mo in episode 3159, broadcast on 26 May 2006. Freddie's reintroduction was announced in July 2022, with Brazier taking over the role. Freddie returned in episode 6551, broadcast on 6 September 2022. The character departed on 5 October 2023, so Brazier could participate in the twenty-first series of Strictly Come Dancing. Freddie starred alongside his great-grandmother Mo Harris (Laila Morse) in a spin-off social media series named The Point of Mo Return before both characters returned to the main show on 20 May 2024. In June 2025, it was announced that Brazier would exit the role after three years. He departed on 2 December.

His storylines have focused on being led to believe that his former stepfather Billy Mitchell (Perry Fenwick) is his biological father, a friendship with Bobby Beale (Clay Milner Russell), being diagnosed with attention deficit hyperactivity disorder (ADHD), reuniting with Theo Hawthorne (William Ellis) – his former teacher who bullied him, discovering that his biological father is his mother's rapist, Graham Foster (Alex McSweeney), a one-night-stand with Bobby's love interest Anna Knight (Molly Rainford), attacking Theo when he attempts to rape his cousin Stacey Slater (Lacey Turner) and entering into a love triangle with Bobby and Anna.

== Development ==
=== Reintroduction and characterisation ===
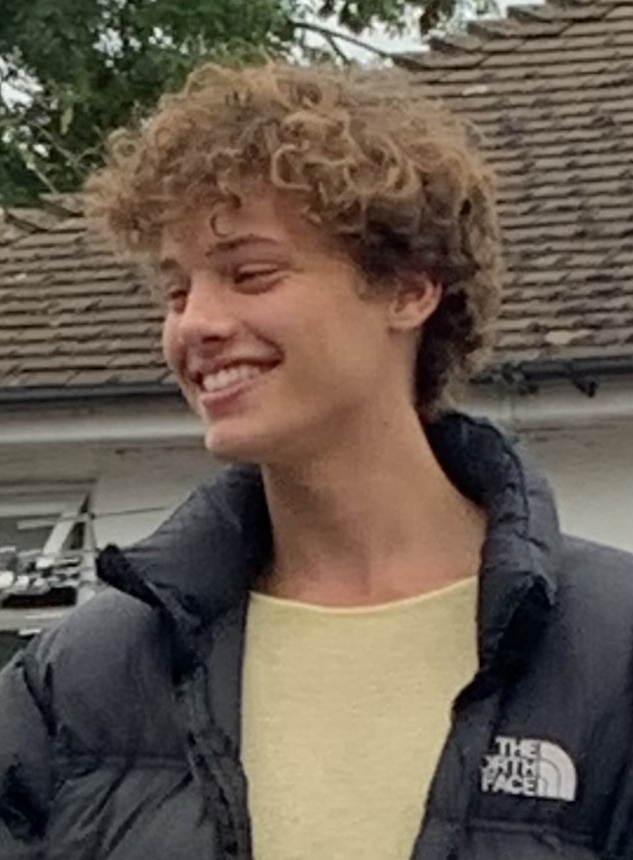
Bobby Brazier (pictured) was cast as Freddie Slater in his acting debut.

On 21 July 2022, EastEnders announced that Freddie Slater would return after 16 years, now being played by Bobby Brazier. The role marked Brazier's acting debut and his character was set to join the soap in Autumn 2022. Executive producer Chris Clenshaw detailed that Brazier was cast after seeing the actor on social media and noticing that: "There was some of what I saw in Bobby [Brazier] that I thought would be perfect for Freddie. His energy, his twinkle, his spiritual side. So then we brought Bobby in to audition along with some others and he just blew us away with his performance. He is Freddie Slater". Brazier was excited to join the show as, by that point: "Everybody has been so beautiful to me and made settling in easier than I could've hoped. Stepping into the acting world has always been a vision of mine and doing that with EastEnders as a Slater is a blessing, I'm very grateful. [I'm] loving every minute of Freddie so far and can't wait to see what's in store for him in Walford". Clenshaw added that Brazier was "an amazing young addition to the EastEnders cast who brings heart and humility to the role of Freddie Slater and I can't wait for audiences to get to know him".

Freddie was characterised as "a typical Slater with a heart of gold", who shares his mother's kind-hearted nature. Clenshaw described him as "a chaotic 18-year-old with a sensitive soul" and "a modern-day lad who's in touch with his spiritual side. He's philosophical, accepting, but full of mischief and makes mistakes". He also described Freddie as "a bit of a cheeky charmer" who "lives in the moment". Brazier commented that his character was "not trying to prove himself as a bad boy", and has a lot of "depth to him". The show teased that the now 18-year-old Freddie would arrive to Walford on a "mission that could end in violence", and that he would clash with Billy Mitchell (Perry Fenwick), as he was his mother's, Little Mo (Kacey Ainsworth), ex-husband. Ainsworth denied speculation that she was returning to the soap alongside Freddie. Clenshaw teased that Freddie would arrive thinking he was the son of Billy, but that it wouldn't be long before he would find out the truth. Freddie went on to make his return on 6 September 2022.

=== Bullying and ADHD diagnosis ===
On 28 March 2023, the show announced that Freddie would become involved in a storyline about having trauma from being bullied by a teacher in his past. Brazier revealed that the storyline would feature his first ever crying scene, which he described as "a great experience". He also admitted "I was filming with Freddie's Nanny Jean and we were sat on the sofa afterwards, and it took us a minute to shake off the tears and sadness, it's interesting as I've mainly been doing comedy, but soon we're going to see some emotion from Freddie". After Freddie was triggered by Jean (Gillian Wright) insulting his intelligence, the teacher was revealed to be Theo Hawthorne (William Ellis), who would humiliate him for his intelligence. Brazier explained that "Freddie used to get called 'thick' at school and made to feel stupid all the time, so what Jean says really hurts him, it forces him to confront things from his past and give the teacher who was horrible to him a bit of a talking to". Freddie is encouraged by Jean and Bobby to confront Theo. Brazier teased that "Freddie feels good for doing it, initially, but this is just the beginning of the story". On 16 May 2023, the show teased that Theo would return to the show, now suspecting Freddie has undiagnosed attention deficit hyperactivity disorder, arriving to give him a referral card for an ADHD specialist. In June 2023, Freddie was officially diagnosed with ADHD and Brazier teased that "history" would be made for his character.

=== Meeting Graham Foster ===
In July 2023, the show revealed that Freddie would meet his father, Graham Foster (Alex McSweeney), against the wishes of his family, after growing curious about his identity. Clenshaw explained that they employed the plot line as producers "felt that it was important for Freddie to find out about the circumstances relating to his conception so he can understand and process the identity of his dad". Brazier explained that Freddie had become frustrated about no one telling him about his father, as, unbeknownst to Freddie, he was conceived after Graham raped Little Mo. Brazier explained: "Freddie wants to find his dad because he's grown up for the past 18 years without know anything about who his dad is and anytime he has wanted to find out about who his dad is he has always been palmed off, he hasn't had any definitive answers to give him peace or that resolution he's looking for. He moved to the Square last year in hopes of finding his family and he also wanted them to point him to the direction of his dad".

Brazier detailed that another factor in Freddie's newfound desire to meet his biological father was his friendship with Alfie Moon (Shane Richie), explaining: "Seeing Alfie, who has kind of taken on that male role model for Freddie as someone he can trust and take shelter on, being such a great dad to his boys, it triggers something in Freddie that hasn't come up for a while but is always there. He wants to go and find his dad. He finds it frustrating that no-one really wants to give him any answers. He doesn't understand, because he can't comprehend why no-one will and why no-one wants to tell him. He can't get his head around the idea that there might be a reason, he just thinks that everyone else is being unfair and that they're just not taking the time for him". Freddie travelled with Bobby to see Graham, only for Graham to lie and tell Bobby that his absence was due to Little Mo excluding him. Upon his return, he was told the truth about Graham and his conception.

=== Arrest and temporary departure ===
On 11 September 2023, Brazier announced that he was taking a temporary exit from the soap to participate in the 21st series of Strictly Come Dancing. Speaking on his departure, Brazier commented that he had already filmed his exit by that point and explained:"I'm taking a break. I've filmed it all, and I'm not telling you [what happens]. I'll be back". In October 2023, Freddie walked in on Theo trying to rape Stacey (Lacey Turner) after stalking her for months. Enraged, Freddie beat him, which knocked him unconscious, and presumably dead. Freddie, Stacey, and Eve Unwin (Heather Peace) delayed calling an ambulance, wanting to make sure Theo was exposed for his crimes, while setting up a scene so they could claim Freddie attacked Theo in self-defence, planting a weapon on Theo and claiming he came at them with a wrench. Freddie is arrested for attempted murder and after an intense police interrogation, he is bailed and Jean suggested Freddie return home to Little Mo for a while until the buzz died down, which Freddie agreed to do. However, after Freddie left, Jean and Stacey were told that Theo had woken up and his statement didn't match.

Brazier confirmed his character's return in February 2024, set to return alongside Morse. Brazier expressed excitement to return, noting that his favourite moment on the show was when he kissed Bobby. Clenshaw was "delighted" to reintroduce the characters, promising that they would be "thrust into the heart of the drama". Brazier teased his return, detailing that: "Freddie comes back with Mo, and you know what Mo's like... you know what Freddie's like, and them two together... carnage". In the lead-up to Freddie and Mo's returns, a six-part spin-off social media mini-series titled The Point of Mo Return starring the characters was released on 17 May 2024. The series was filmed in a vlog style and followed the lives of the pair living in Mo's caravan prior to returning. It also offered a glimpse into Freddie's experiences with ADHD. Freddie was revealed to return "on a mission" to reignite Kat and Alfie's relationship, and that he would live in Alfie's flat.

== Storylines ==
=== 2004–2006 ===
Freddie was conceived in late 2003 when his mother, Little Mo Mitchell (Kacey Ainsworth), is raped by her friend, Graham Foster (Alex McSweeney). Her refusal to abort the child results in the break down of her marriage to Billy Mitchell (Perry Fenwick). Little Mo stays with her sister, Belinda Peacock (Leanne Lakey), where she gives birth to Freddie. In November 2004, after Graham is sentenced to eight years imprisonment, Little Mo and Billy make another attempt at their marriage, but they separate again after Billy admits that he is struggling to accept Freddie. Freddie then lives at the Slater family household with Little Mo, his great-grandmother Big Mo (Laila Morse), his grandfather Charlie Slater (Derek Martin) and second cousin Stacey Slater (Lacey Turner). In February and March 2006, Freddie causes Little Mo much stress by crying a lot. He takes a trip to the park with Little Mo, Jane Collins (Laurie Brett) and Bobby Beale (Kevin Curran), where Bobby pokes him in the forehead with a stick, and so Freddie is taken to hospital. However, the incident results in a visit from a health visitor. Little Mo thinks that the health visitor is accusing her of abusing Freddie and becomes angry and hostile. Little Mo struggles to cope with Freddie when he begins teething.

In May 2006, Freddie is rushed to hospital, seriously ill with bleeding on the brain. A few days before the hospital admission, Little Mo admits to her boyfriend Oliver Cousins (Tom Ellis), who is also a GP, that she sometimes gets very irritated with Freddie when he cries. When Oliver hears that Freddie's injury must have been caused by shaking or rough handling, he admits what Little Mo has told him to a paediatrician, Briony Campbell (Rae Hendrie), at the hospital. While the hospital believes that Little Mo may have shaken her son, Little Mo suspects that ten-year-old Ben Mitchell (Charlie Jones) may have hurt him in some way, as they were left unsupervised together just before the incident. Little Mo confronts Ben and shakes him in irritation when he tries to run away. After extensive tests at the hospital, it is discovered that Freddie has a temporary low platelet count, due to an infection, meaning that any minor injury could hurt him badly, as his blood is not clotting properly. Little Mo is no longer suspected of hurting her son. Freddie leaves Walford on 26 May 2006 with Little Mo, who wants to start a new life in Barnstaple, Devon.

=== 2022–2025 ===
Freddie returns to Walford in September 2022, having decided to track down Billy, whom he believes is his father, after having an argument with Little Mo. Billy keeps up the pretence of being his father, to the annoyance of his partner Honey Mitchell (Emma Barton), so as not to hurt Freddie. Freddie starts to bond with his assumed half-siblings Janet (Grace) and Will (Freddie Phillips), and even steals a fascinator for Janet, as she had her eye on it. When Billy is arrested for the murder of Malcolm Keeble (Christopher Pizzey) and needs money to hire a good solicitor, Freddie becomes determined to help him out and gets a job at the local fish and chip shop, having lied to Bobby Beale (Clay Milner Russell) that he has lengthy experience. Despite getting off to a bad start, Bobby gives him another chance and Freddie becomes an instant success with the customers. Freddie initially lives with his aunt, Kat Slater (Jessie Wallace) and her fiancé, Phil Mitchell (Steve McFadden) but after Phil tells him that Billy is not his father, a rift develops between them and he moves in with Stacey and her family, eventually joined by Kat's ex-husband, Alfie Moon (Shane Richie). Billy explains to Freddie that while it is true he is not his father, he wishes that he was and if it is not too late, would like to act as a surrogate father to him, which Freddie accepts. Due to his cheerful and laid back personality, Freddie soon settles into life in Walford and becomes close friends with Bobby as well as building solid relationships with Stacey, her mother Jean Slater (Gillian Wright) and Alfie, the latter of whom he later moves into Harvey Monroe's (Ross Boatman) former flat with.

Freddie has sex with Anna Knight (Molly Rainford), knowing that Bobby has a crush on her. They try and conceal this from Bobby, but his father Ian Beale (Adam Woodyatt) exposes them publicly, leading to Bobby and Freddie falling out. In October 2023, Freddie walks in on his former schoolteacher Theo Hawthorne (William Ellis) trying to rape Stacey, and he violently beating him. He accidentally knocks Theo out unconscious and is arrested. After being released on bail, Freddie goes to stay with Little Mo temporarily. In May 2024, Freddie returns to Walford with his great-grandmother Big Mo. It is revealed that his feelings for Anna have developed during his time away from Walford. He tries to avoid Anna, and he reveals to her sister Gina Knight (Francesca Henry) that he is hiding his crush on Anna. Freddie discovers that Anna is pregnant with Bobby's baby and is planning on having an abortion. He agrees to keep quiet and grows closer to Anna when he supports her. They share a kiss just as Bobby walks in; he attacks Freddie and ends their friendship before leaving Walford. Freddie and Anna begin a slow-burning relationship, but Anna's mixed signals make Freddie believe that she does not love him. He sleeps with Gina but hides this from Anna, although Anna learns the truth when she overhears a conversation between Gina and their mother Cindy Beale (Michelle Collins). Anna ends their relationship, leaving Freddie upset.

== Reception ==
After the character's first appearance of his reintroduction, Laura Denby of Radio Times called Brazier's debut acting role "promising", adding that "it feels inevitable that Freddie will soon steal our hearts". Brazier received praise on social media for a scene where Freddie gives Billy a pep talk about handling Lola Pearce's (Danielle Harold) cancer, with Rafi Mauro-Benady of MyLondon reporting that it left fans "in tears". His colleague, Dan Wiggins, noticed Freddie was "a big hit amongst fans, with his jokey and kind-hearted manner winning them over in no time". After the friendship between Freddie and Bobby sparked, they were commonly shipped by fans and several viewers predicted they would become a couple. Stephen Patterson of Metro reported that Freddie had been "popular" with viewers, writing that Freddie "has proven himself to be one of the kindest souls to ever set foot in Walford, determined to help his nearest and dearest at every given turn". Katherine Heslop of Mirror called the scene where Freddie opens up about Jean about his bullying "moving", reporting that many fans had been "left in tears". The speed in which Freddie achieved an ADHD diagnosis was considered unrealistic by viewers. Brazier won the award for "Rising Star" at the 2023 National Television Awards. The manner in which Freddie incapacitated Theo, by hitting his head with a clothing iron was praised by fans as it was a reference to a 2001 scene where Little Mo fended off her abusive husband Trevor Morgan (Alex Ferns). Maisie Spackman of Metro called Freddie a "much-loved" character with a "devastating" temporary exit. Laura-Jayne Tyler from Inside Soap commented that she loves Freddie as he is "up for anything!" Sarah Ellis from the same magazine wrote that Freddie's innocence was "exactly" what the Square needed, adding, "Top marks for Freddie!"
