= Ade (actor) =

British actor

- Born: c. 1970 (age 55–56); Crouch End, London
- Website: http://www.2000ade.com

Ade (born c. 1970) is a British actor. He played Tyrone, the getaway driver, in Snatch. Ade also works within the music and publishing industries.

He has also appeared in Casino Royale, The 51st State and Sugarhouse.

== Filmography ==
Year	Title	Role	Notes
2000	Snatch	Tyrone	
2001	The 51st State	Omar	
2004	Keen Eddie	Russell the Pig	TV series. 1 episode ("Keeping Up Appearances")
2006	Casino Royale	Infante	
2007	Sugarhouse	Paul	
2008	Filth and Wisdom	DJ	
2009	Fetch	Cesear	Short film
