= Prayer Room (play) =

Prayer Room is a play by the British playwright Shan Khan. The play was commissioned by the Edinburgh International Festival and premiered at the Royal Lyceum Theatre in a co-production with the Birmingham Repertory Theatre in August 2005.

== Plot ==
The play is allegorical in nature, set in the bland, non-denominational prayer room of a present-day British University where Jewish, Christian and Muslim students all have specific days when they can use it. Conflict grows when the Jews demand more time, and the Muslims find themselves deprived of their regular Friday slot and the Christians try to take a back-seat and let the other two fight it out.

== Premier ==
The play premiered at Royal Lyceum Theatre in August 2005 as part of Edinburgh International Festival, before returning for a limited run at Birmingham Repertory Theatre.

The play was directed by Angus Jackson and received largely positive reviews.

The play was designed by Lucy Osborne and lit by Neil Austin.

== Original cast ==
- Riz Ahmed – Fiz
- Jimmy Akingbola - Bunce
- Ashley Madekwe - Jade
- William Ellis - Griffin
- Tolga Safer - Brother Kazi
- Iddo Goldberg - Reuben
- Hannah Watkins - Rila
- Howard Ward - Principal
- Peter Swander - Brother Convert
