= Chris Evangelou =

British boxer (born 1986)

Christopher Evangelou
Personal information
- Nickname: The Flash
- Nationality: British
- Born: 12 January 1986 (age 40) Wood Green, London, England
- Weight: Light-welterweight; Welterweight

Boxing career
- Stance: Orthodox

Boxing record
- Total fights: 16
- Wins: 13
- Win by KO: 2
- Losses: 3

Christopher Evangelou (12 January 1986) is a British actor and former professional boxer who competed from 2009 to 2016.

== Early life ==
Christopher Evangelou was born in Wood Green, London in the United Kingdom on 12 January 1986. He is of Greek Cypriot origin.

Growing up, Evangelou and his family would wake up at 3 AM to watch Mike Tyson, Evander Holyfield, and Naseem Hamed fight.

Evangelou's brother, Preston, took up boxing and exposed Chris to boxing at an early age.

When Evangelou was 17 he was involved in a verbal altercation in the street. While the incident did not get physical, he said that he felt "an inch tall after that" and he "could've done better," so he decided to start boxing.

== Amateur career ==
Evangelou started boxing at the Haringey Boxing Gym in Tottenham when he was 17 under coach Chris Hall and had his first amateur fight after 6 months of training. He decided to pursue boxing as a career at age 18. As an amateur, he won 5 international gold medals and a 2006 national champion in the under-20 category. He was recruited to box for Cyprus at the 2008 Olympic games in Beijing but he lost his last qualifying match to the number one boxer on the German team. Evangelou turned professional at the age of 23 after an amateur career of 40 fights with 35 wins.

== Professional career ==
As a professional, Evangelou was offered contracts at several boxing gyms. He went to the Wildcard Boxing Gym in Los Angeles, California to meet acclaimed boxing trainers Freddie Roach and Jesse Reid. After a sparring session, the coaches at the Wildcard Boxing Gym offered Evangelou a contract but he refused because he wanted to stay in the UK, where his family and fans were. He also spent time training with boxing legend Ricky Hatton. Evangelou was considering signing with Hatton's camp and also the camp of Calzaghe Promotions, a boxing organization run by former World Boxing Organization super middleweight champion Joe Calzaghe. Evangelou finally decided to sign for Matchroom Promotions which is part of the Barry Hearn sporting group.

Evangelou suffered his first defeat on 8 September 2012 to Danny Connor 98–94 in a ten-round competition at London's Alexandra Palace. The decision was questioned by many boxing pundits and professionals who had thought it a clear win for Evangelou. In July 2011, he set a goal to be fighting for an English title by the end of the year. In an interview in March 2012 with World Boxing News, he said that he would like to compete against Darren Hamilton for the Southern Area Belt to earn a spot in the rankings as one of Britain's top 10 fighters.

A rematch with Danny Connor ended with a 97–93 victory to Connor who knocked Evangelou down twice in the 7th round. Evangelou suffered a further loss on 30 November 2013 on points 56–59 to Ashley Mayall making a 3rd defeat in a row.

In 2014 Evangelou won both bouts he contested, a points win 40–37 over journeyman Dan Carr and a first-round KO of Mick Mills.

Evangelou was scheduled to face Zoran Cvek on 27 September 2014 for the International Masters Welterweight Title.

Evangelou is managed by his father Costakis Evangelou, who handles publicity and sponsorship for his son.

Evangelou's older brother Andreas "The Ace" Evangelou is also a boxer and is undefeated in the light heavyweight division.

== Professional boxing record ==
16 fights	13 wins	3 losses
By knockout	2	0
By decision	11	3

No.	Result	Record	Opponent	Type	Round, time	Date	Location	Notes
16	Win	13–3	(United Kingdom) James Gorman	PTS	4	12 Mar 2016	(United Kingdom) York Hall, London, England	
15	Win	12–3	(Croatia) Zoran Cvek	PTS	10	27 Sep 2014	(United Kingdom) York Hall, London, England	Won vacant International Masters welterweight title
14	Win	11–3	(United Kingdom) Mick Mills	KO	1 (6), 3:09	12 Jul 2014	(United Kingdom) York Hall, London, England	
13	Win	10–3	(United Kingdom) Dan Carr	PTS	4	22 Feb 2014	(United Kingdom) York Hall, London, England	
12	Loss	9–3	(United Kingdom) Ashley Mayall	PTS	6	30 Nov 2013	(United Kingdom) Copper Box Arena, London, England	
11	Loss	9–2	(United Kingdom) Cassius Connor	PTS	10	9 Mar 2013	(United Kingdom) Wembley Arena, London, England	For Southern Area super-lightweight title
10	Loss	9–1	(United Kingdom) Cassius Connor	PTS	10	8 Sep 2012	(United Kingdom) Alexandra Palace, London, England	For vacant Southern Area super-lightweight title
9	Win	9–0	(United Kingdom) Joel Ryan	PTS	4	9 Nov 2011	(United Kingdom) York Hall, London, England	
8	Win	8–0	(United Kingdom) Jon Baguley	PTS	4	23 Jul 2011	(United Kingdom) Wembley Arena, London, England	
7	Win	7–0	(United Kingdom) Ibrar Riyaz	PTS	4	30 Apr 2011	(United Kingdom) Olympia, London, England	
	Win	6–0	(United Kingdom) Jason Nesbitt	PTS	4	19 Feb 2011	(United Kingdom) Wembley Arena, London, England	
5	Win	5–0	(Poland) Arek Malek	PTS	6	27 Nov 2010	(United Kingdom) Scotstoun Stadium, Glasgow, Scotland	
4	Win	4–0	(United Kingdom) Aaron Fox	PTS	4	9 Jul 2010	(United Kingdom) York Hall, London, England	
3	Win	3–0	(Lithuania) Marius Jasutis	KO	1 (4), 0:49	9 Apr 2010	(United Kingdom) Alexandra Palace, London, England	
2	Win	2–0	(United Kingdom) Johnny Greaves	PTS	4	12 Feb 2010	(United Kingdom) York Hall, London, England	
1	Win	1–0	(United Kingdom) Kristian Laight	PTS	4	18 Dec 2009	(United Kingdom) York Hall, London, England	

== Acting career ==
Evangelou retired from boxing to pursue acting. He appeared in the Guy Ritchie film, The Gentlemen, as a boxer/hitman named "Primetime." Later in 2020, Evangelou released a short film called Shadow Boxer that tackled the topic of mental health in the boxing community. The short was sent to the film festival circuit.

In 2023, Evangelou started portraying Troy in EastEnders.
