= List of EastEnders characters introduced in 2023 =

EastEnders logo

EastEnders is a BBC soap opera that first aired on 19 February 1985. The following is a list of characters that first appeared in 2023, in order of first appearance. All characters are introduced by the show's executive producer, Chris Clenshaw. The first character to be introduced is Brett Nelson (Fabrizio Santino), a man from Zack Hudson's (James Farrar) past; he appears in January. Emma Harding (Patsy Kensit), the estranged mother of Lola Pearce (Danielle Harold), and Jed (Bradley Jaden), a lodger for Sonia Fowler (Natalie Cassidy), also first appear in January. Jo Cotton (Vicki Michelle), the estranged wife of Tom "Rocky" Cotton (Brian Conley), and guest characters Shiv (Peter Caulfield) and Troy (Chris Evangelou) debut in March. Theo Hawthorne (William Ellis), the former teacher of Freddie Slater (Bobby Brazier), first appears in April.

The Knight family – consisting of patriarch George Knight (Colin Salmon), his two daughters Gina Knight (Francesca Henry) and Anna Knight (Molly Rainford), and Tyson, their pet Chihuahua – are introduced in June. Jasper Parrott, Rocky's pet parrot, and DS Miles (Samantha Seager), a detective sergeant investigating Suki Panesar's (Balvinder Sopal) fall, also debut in June. Caz Johnston (Bryony Afferson), a woman from Eve Unwin's (Heather Peace) backstory, appears in August. September features the introductions of Charli Slater, the newborn daughter of Lily Slater (Lillia Turner) and Ricky Branning (Frankie Day), and Nadine Keller (Jazzy Phoenix), a love interest for Jay Brown (Jamie Borthwick). The following month, Priya Nandra-Hart (Sophie Khan Levy), the former partner of Ravi Gulati (Aaron Thiara), and their daughter, Avani Nandra-Hart (Aaliyah James), joined the cast. Pastor Clayton (Howard Saddler) made his first appearance in December. Additionally, multiple other characters were featured during the year.

== Brett Nelson ==
Brett Nelson, played by Fabrizio Santino, first appears in episode 6625, originally broadcast on 9 January 2023. The character and Santino's casting details were announced on 29 December 2022. Brett is introduced as someone from Zack Hudson's (James Farrar) past. He is described as "enigmatic". Producers used the characters of Brett and Zack to explore the issue of HIV and worked with the charity Terrence Higgins Trust to develop the story. Having previously tackled the issue in the 1990s using the character of Mark Fowler (Todd Carty), EastEnders aims to highlight the developments in HIV research in the last 30 years. The shared backstory between Brett and Zack states that the latter contracted HIV from Brett after they shared needles from steroid injections. The character makes his final appearance in episode 6631, originally broadcast on 19 January 2023.

== Emma Harding ==
Emma Harding
- EastEnders character
- Portrayed by: Patsy Kensit
- First appearance: Episode 6635; 25 January 2023
- Last appearance: Episode 6768; 14 September 2023
- Introduced by: Chris Clenshaw
In-universe information
- Other names: Nicole (alias)
- Occupation: Insurance expert
- Mother: Edie
- Husband: Dan Pearce (backstory)
- Daughters: Lola Pearce
- Granddaughters: Lexi Pearce

Emma Harding, played by Patsy Kensit, first appears in episode 6635, originally broadcast on 25 January 2023. The character and Kensit's casting details were first reported on 5 November 2022, with further details announced on 20 December 2022. Emma is introduced as the estranged mother of established character Lola Pearce (Danielle Harold), who is terminally ill with a brain tumour. Kensit was contracted for a "short stint" and began filming in November 2022. Chris Clenshaw, the show's executive producer, thought Emma shared some similarities with Lola, including "a striking resemblance; successful, the capacity to hold her own [...] and she's a fighter". He noted that Emma is also "softly spoken and measured", unlike Lola.

The character's backstory states that she left Lola and her father, Dan, when Lola was three years old. Clenshaw explained that Emma wants to reconcile with her daughter, having felt guilty since she left. Kensit expressed her joy at appearing in the soap and praised the show's cast and production team. Clenshaw called Kensit the "perfect fit" for the character of Emma, who he described as "a long-awaited character that we know very little about". He added, "Patsy's portrayal is bound to set off fireworks in Walford and cause havoc for the Mitchell household." The character appears across two months, departing in episode 6672, originally broadcast on 30 March 2023. Her exit was described as "heartwrenching" by Justin Harp of Digital Spy. Kensit made a cameo appearance as Emma in episode 6722, originally broadcast on 27 June 2023, following Harold's departure. In the narrative, an upset Emma delivers flowers to Lola's funeral. Kensit's second return was reported on 22 July 2023 by Laura Armstrong of the Daily Mirror. A show publicist explained that the actress had impressed producers and was surprised to be invited back. She had already begun filming her return. Emma returns in the episode broadcast on 11 September 2023.

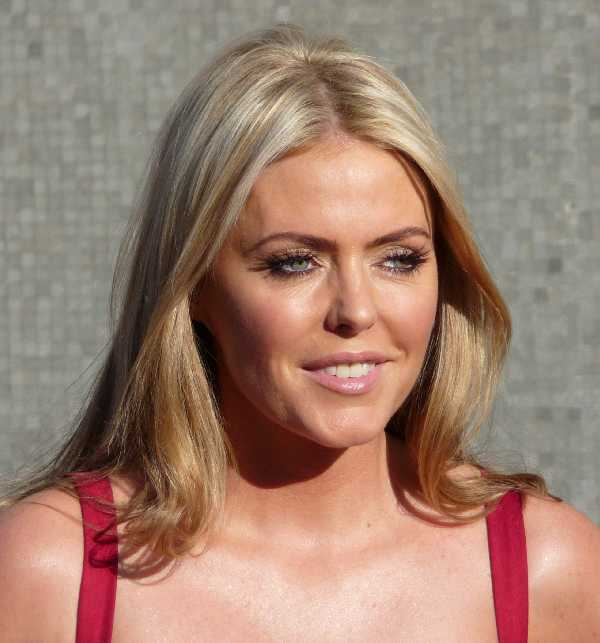
Patsy Kensit portrays Emma Harding.

Lola's grandfather, Billy Mitchell (Perry Fenwick), tracks Emma down after Lola expresses a wish to meet her mother before she dies. Emma admits that she is always thinking about Lola, but declines an invite to her wedding that day. Despite this, she visits Walford, where Lola lives, and watches her and her husband, Jay Brown (Jamie Borthwick), from afar. Emma books an appointment at Fox & Hair salon, where Lola works, under the name Nicole; they bond but Emma does not reveal her identity. She is then upset to learn that Lola is terminally ill through watching her online vlogs. When Lola tells Emma about her daughter, Lexi Pearce (Isabella Brown), being bullied, Emma visits the school and threatens the bully. Emma anonymously delivers an envelope of money to Lola, who is concerned about the delivery. When Emma books another appointment with Lola and tips her cash, Lola becomes suspicious and accuses Emma of delivering money. As Emma explains that she is trying to help Lola, Billy and Jay enter and reveal that Emma is Lola's mother. Although Lola is initially against speaking to Emma, she relents when Emma explains that Dan was an abusive alcoholic who hospitalised her when he threw boiling water over her. She adds that Dan then took Lola away and lied that Emma had abandoned her; Lola does not believe her but changes her mind when Emma shows her the scars from the incident.

Emma tries to rebuild her relationship with Lola, but Billy and Jay are suspicious of her intentions. Lola struggles with Emma's overbearing behaviour and asks for some space. Before leaving, Emma gives Lexi a locket with her phone number in. A few weeks later, Lexi calls Emma to inform her of Lola's deterioration. Whilst initially angry that Emma gave her phone number to Lexi, Lola soon reconciles with Emma, who becomes wary of Jay. At Peggy's bar, Emma spots Jay and another woman talking and assumes they are having an affair; she tells Lola, who throws Jay out. After speaking to Billy's partner and Jay's former girlfriend, Honey Mitchell (Emma Barton), Emma realises that she was wrong and apologises. Emma, Lola and Lexi then spend Mother's Day together, which upsets Lexi, who wanted to spend the day alone with Lola. Emma supports Lola, Jay and Lexi when they arrange a charity fundraiser, but she is devastated when Lola learns that her tumour is incurable and she has six months to live. Emma confides in Sam Mitchell (Kim Medcalf) that she believes Lola is better off without her. Emma then tells Lola that she has been offered a job in America. Lola is furious with Emma for considering leaving her again and tells her that she never wants to see her again. Two months later, Lola dies, having never reconciled with her mother. Emma arrives at her funeral with a large bouquet of flowers, but becomes overwhelmed and leaves, with only Honey seeing her.

Emma returns three months later, after it is revealed that Lexi has been texting her for weeks, confiding in her after being bullied at secondary school. She meets with Ben Mitchell (Max Bowden), Lexi's father, and warns him about Lexi's bullying. Ben angrily orders Emma to leave but his husband, Callum Highway (Tony Clay), agrees to meet up with Emma to discuss Lexi. After having a drink at Peggy's, Emma has sex with Ben's father, Phil Mitchell (Steve McFadden), who is about to marry Kat Slater (Jessie Wallace). Emma tries to blackmail Phil into arranging regular contact for her and Lexi, but he threatens her instead. Emma soon leaves again and is forced by Phil to discontinue contact with Lexi. Phil's sister Sam later exposes the affair, leading to the breakdown of Phil's marriage to Kat.

== Jed ==
Jed, played by Bradley Jaden, first appears in episode 6638, originally broadcast on 31 January 2023. The character and Jaden's casting details were announced on 24 January 2023. Jed is introduced as a lodger for Sonia Fowler (Natalie Cassidy) at number 25 Albert Square. He is billed as a "free spirit" who charms Sonia. Lewis Knight from the Radio Times suggested that Jed may be involved in a love triangle with Sonia and Reiss Colwell (Jonny Freeman). The character departs in episode 6644, originally broadcast on 10 February 2023, when he is evicted.

== Shiv ==
Shiv (credited as Shifty Shiv), played by Peter Caulfield, first appears in episode 6667, originally broadcast on 22 March 2023. The character and Caulfield's casting details were announced on 14 March 2023. Shiv is introduced as a "shifty" loan shark who loans money to Stacey Slater (Lacey Turner). He is billed as "nasty" and a "villainous character". The character is created as part of a story exploring the impact of the cost-of-living crisis on families. Turner explained that Stacey is scared of Shiv because "he's not a normal thug, he's a creepy thug." The character makes his final appearance in episode 6678, originally broadcast on 11 April 2023.

== Troy ==
Troy, played by Chris Evangelou, first appears in episode 6669, originally broadcast on 27 March 2023. Evangelou's casting was publicised in a social media post by co-star Max Bowden on 22 March 2023. Details about the character were then announced on 27 March 2023. Troy is introduced as a boxer at the Boxing Den gym, a new set on the show. Evangelou is a former professional boxer and was cast in a guest role. The character appears in a story with Ben Mitchell, portrayed by Bowden, as Ben takes up boxing at the gym. Bowden enjoyed working with Evangelou on the story. Evangelou was excited to be cast in the soap and felt "grateful for this opportunity".

== Jo Cotton ==
Jo Cotton
- EastEnders character
- Portrayed by: Vicki Michelle
- First appearance: Episode 6671; 29 March 2023
- Last appearance: Episode 6736; 20 July 2023
- Introduced by: Chris Clenshaw
In-universe information
- Husband: Tom "Rocky" Cotton (until 2023)

Jo Cotton, played by Vicki Michelle, first appears in episode 6671, originally broadcast on 29 March 2023. Michelle's casting in the soap was reported on 4 February 2023. Details about her character were announced by executive producer Chris Clenshaw during an interview on Loose Women on 24 February 2023. The character had been referenced in episode 6596, first broadcast on 23 November 2022. Jo is introduced as the estranged wife of established character Tom "Rocky" Cotton (Brian Conley), who is engaged to Kathy Beale (Gillian Taylforth). Jo is characterised as "brash, quick-witted, and extremely glamorous" by Clenshaw. The character's backstory states that Jo and Rocky have been married for 25 years. Producers kept most details about the backstory embargoed.

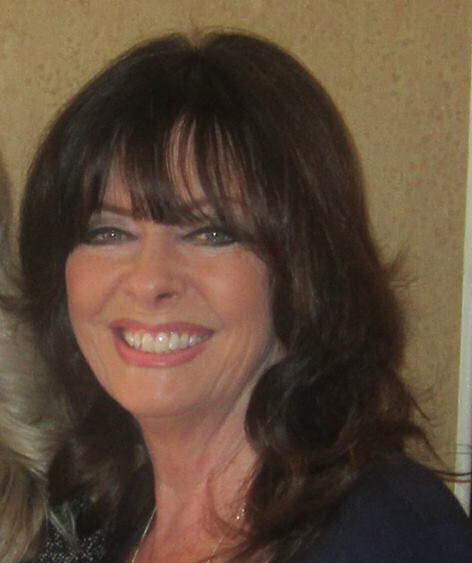
Vicki Michelle portrays Jo Cotton.

Michelle was contracted to appear in two episodes and began filming in February. The character departs in episode 6672, originally broadcast on 30 March 2023. Appearing on Lorraine, Michelle told host Lorraine Kelly that she wanted the role to be developed into a regular position. Michelle's return was reported in June 2023 as part of her character's story with Rocky. Jo's return also assisted in the introduction of Rocky's pet parrot Jasper. Michelle confirmed that she would return for episodes 6713 and 6714, originally broadcast on 12 and 13 June 2023, respectively. Michelle returned again in July 2023 for four episodes centring around Rocky and Kathy's wedding. Lewis Knight from the Radio Times predicted that the character would return again to "cause more trouble".

As part of Jo's introduction, she is contacted by Freddie Slater (Bobby Brazier) and arrives at Kathy's house. Conley explained that Rocky is "devastated" by Jo's arrival and "watches on in horror" as Jo meets Kathy. He added that "all hell is going to break loose" through Jo's introduction. Michelle expressed her delight at the character and story. The actress enjoyed working with Conley and Taylforth, who she already knew before filming. She told Ashleigh Rainbird of the Daily Mirror that she was nervous for filming and accidentally messed up one line five times, but found reassurance from her co-stars. Having been raised in the East End of London, Michelle felt the role was right for her and used her native accent when playing Jo. Clenshaw was delighted to welcome Michelle to the cast and deemed her the "perfect fit to take on the elusive character of Rocky's wife". He praised the scenes between Jo, Rocky and Kathy, calling them "brilliant".

The character received a positive reception from critics and viewers alike. Grace Morris of What to Watch called her arrival "explosive" and predicted that she could be reintroduced in the future. She also noted that the audience liked the character and her "sassy one-liners", hoping that Michelle would join the show's main cast. Likewise, MyLondon's Angie Quinn praised her "sarcastic insults and glamorous looks" and observed that she had "instantly become a hit with impressed EastEnders viewers".

== Theo Hawthorne ==
Theo Hawthorne
- EastEnders character
- Portrayed by: William Ellis
- First appearance: Episode 6675; 5 April 2023
- Last appearance: Episode 6810; 28 November 2023
- Introduced by: Chris Clenshaw
In-universe information
- Occupation: Teacher; Private tutor

Theo Hawthorne, played by William Ellis, first appears in episode 6675, originally broadcast on 5 April 2023. The character and Ellis' casting details were announced on 29 March 2023. Theo is introduced as the former teacher of Freddie Slater (Bobby Brazier). Their shared backstory states that Theo would humiliate Freddie in front of his peers. This leads to his arrival when Freddie confronts him over his past actions. The character appears as a "pivotal" part of Freddie's new story exploring attention deficit hyperactivity disorder (ADHD) when he suggests that Freddie may have the condition. Lucy Robinson from OK! praised the story in an article about symptoms of ADHD.

After hearing about Stacey Slater's (Lacey Turner) current financial issues during the cost of living crisis, he buys her pregnant daughter Lily Slater (Lillia Turner) a pair of shoes. Stacey later tells Theo that he over stepped the mark, and it was left at that until Theo secretly gives the shoes back to Lily. The shoes are quickly noticed by Lily's friends, Amy Mitchell (Ellie Dadd), Denzel Danes (Jaden Ladega) and Davinder "Nugget" Gulati (Juhaim Rasul Choudhury), to which Lily tells them an older man has brought them her. After rising worries from friend Amy, Amy later tells Stacey that Lily still has the shoes, thus Stacey making Lily throw the shoes in the bin. After Lily fears about her financial stability towards her child, she calls Theo from Freddie's mobile phone. As money troubles increase in the Slater household, Theo gives Lily £50, telling her to tell her family that the money was from Ricky Mitchell (Frankie Day), the father of her unborn baby. Stacey's ex-husband Martin Fowler (James Bye) soon hears about Theo tutoring Lily for free and buying her shoes, he soon brings up these suspicions to Stacey, who shuts them down. Martin then goes to Theo's old school he used to be employed at seeking to find evidence and a receptionist there later tells Martin that he had an inappropriate relationship with someone at the school. Theo was later revealed as a stalker of Stacey's, after watching her online via webcams. Later, Theo is left by Stacey's mother Jean Slater (Gillian Wright) on his own with Lily, and she is rushed to hospital after stomach pains. Martin pushes Theo up against the wall in a rage. Stacey later tells Martin to give Theo a chance, to which he does. Eve Unwin (Heather Peace) asks Theo to attend the wedding of Kathy Beale (Gillian Taylforth) and Tom "Rocky" Cotton (Brian Conley) as Stacey's +1, unaware that Stacey is trying to rekindle her relationship with Martin.

Theo later continues to stalk Stacey after being revealed as the stalker. Stacey takes a stand in the community centre to other angry parents after telling them about the whole stalking ordeal. Theo later prints inappropriate images of Stacey and later sticks them around Albert Square. When Stacey finds out this, she goes next door to where Theo has moved to have it out with him, but he has left for court as Stacey has reported him to the police and is waiting to obtain a Stalking Protection Order against Theo. Theo later breaks into the house after being acquitted by the judge and attempts to rape Stacey, but Freddie finds him and attacks him with an iron as he is not coping with the idea of his father Graham Foster (Alex McSweeney) raping his mother Little Mo Mitchell (Kacey Ainsworth). Freddie is later arrested for attempted murder. Theo is then not seen until he asks Stacey to meet him before the trial; she asks him to plead guilty to make it right. He later does and is sentenced.

== Debbie Colwell ==
Debbie Colwell
- EastEnders character
- Portrayed by: Jenny Meier
- Duration: 2023–2024
- First appearance: Episode 6694; 9 May 2023
- Last appearance: Episode 6951; 29 July 2024
- Introduced by: Chris Clenshaw
In-universe information
- Other names: Debbie Collins
- Father: Hugh Collins
- Mother: Brenda Collins
- Husband: Reiss Colwell (until 2024)

Debbie Colwell (also Collins), portrayed by Jenny Meier, is the wife of Reiss Colwell (Jonny Freeman) who is in hospital under 24-hour care after experiencing a stroke in the bath, which left her with a bleed on the brain, unable to move or communicate. She first appeared in Episode 6694, which originally aired on 9 May 2023 and initially made two appearances. Reiss had recently entered a relationship with Sonia Fowler (Natalie Cassidy) but kept his marriage a secret. When Sonia learns the truth, Reiss tries to explain by taking her to meet Debbie. He mentions that Debbie has a bad infection, so the hospital keep calling him. After they leave Debbie, Sonia tells Reiss that she cannot forgive him for lying. Natalie Cassidy, who plays Sonia, discussed whether their relationship was really over, explaining: "When she orders him out of her life, it's more about that moment and feeling humiliated – it's her birthday and they were due to perform on stage in front of everybody in the Square – so everything quickly comes crashing down." Sonia changes her mind and reconciles with Reiss; they decide to visit Debbie and watch Pointless, where Reiss falls asleep. Debbie made a third appearance in Episode 6774, which originally aired on 26 September 2023, when Reiss pays her a visit after attending a hospital appointment with Sonia regarding IVF treatment. Having stolen money from Debbie's savings to pay for the treatment, he thanks her for giving them the money and promises to pay her back.

Debbie next appeared in Episode 6923, originally broadcast on 10 June 2024, when Sonia's half-sister, Bianca Jackson (Patsy Palmer) senses that Reiss is not being completely honest with his finances when she catches him asking Debbie for money. Bianca gave Reiss an ultimatum that if he didn't tell Sonia what he was up to, she would. However, when Bianca does tell Sonia, she doesn't believe her and they end up falling out. In Episode 6947, broadcasting on 22 July 2024, Reiss began to draw together a plan to sort out his finances after discovering that Sonia is now pregnant. Reiss received a phone call from Debbie's care home and he was told she would be moved unless he paid the £13.5k bill. This led to him attempting to scam his boss, Sharon Watts (Letitia Dean). In Episode 6949, airing on 24 July 2024, after Reiss "runs out of options," he smothered Debbie with a pillow in what was described to be a "shocking twist". When Reiss returned home the next day, Sonia broke the news to him that Debbie had died, but had been told it could be due to pneumonia.

On 25 July 2024, it was announced that after Debbie's murder, EastEnders were going to introduce her parents. Nichola McAuliffe was cast as her mother, Brenda Collins, and Michael Bertenshaw was cast as her father, Hugh Collins. They arrived in Episode 6951, originally airing on 29 July 2024, with "plenty of questions," as Reiss has "got a lot of explaining to do." They meet Sonia, who is Reiss's girlfriend, which has been described to "throw the cat among the pigeons as they dissect what that could mean for how their daughter suddenly died". Justin Harp from Digital Spy described that "Reiss's in-laws also don't know he's been dating Sonia Fowler while Debbie lay in a coma. The Collinses will certainly have some uncomfortable questions for their son-in-law."

== George Knight ==
George Knight, played by Colin Salmon, first appears in episode 6708, originally broadcast on 1 June 2023. The character and Salmon's casting details were announced on 28 March 2023. George is introduced as part of the Knight family, who buy into The Queen Victoria pub, a focal setting in the soap. The family consist of patriarch George, his two daughters Gina Knight (Francesca Henry) and Anna Knight (Molly Rainford), and their pet Chihuahua, Tyson. George's partner Elaine Peacock (Harriet Thorpe), who is the mother of established character Linda Carter (Kellie Bright), is also introduced with the family. Salmon began filming in March 2023.

== Anna Knight ==
Anna Knight, played by Molly Rainford, first appears in episode 6708, originally broadcast on 1 June 2023. Rainford's casting was first reported on 1 March 2023, with the character and further details announced on 28 March 2023. Anna is introduced as part of the Knight family, who buy into The Queen Victoria pub, a focal setting in the soap. The family consist of patriarch George Knight (Colin Salmon), George's two daughters Gina Knight (Francesca Henry) and Anna, and their pet Chihuahua, Tyson. George's partner Elaine Peacock (Harriet Thorpe), who is the mother of established character Linda Carter (Kellie Bright), is also introduced with the family. Anna is characterised as "fun, loveable, and big-hearted", but also someone not to be misjudged. Chris Clenshaw, the show's executive producer, explained that the family have been "bound together for years" and moving to the show's setting of Walford creates "the fresh-start the Knights are looking for". Rainford expressed her joy at joining the cast and commented, "it's an honour to bring the character Anna Knight to life who is set to stir up drama upon her arrival". Clenshaw expressed his delight at casting a "hugely talented group of actors" and looked forward to their first scenes airing.

== Gina Knight ==
Gina Knight, played by Francesca Henry, first appears in episode 6708, originally broadcast on 1 June 2023. The character and Henry's casting details were announced on 28 March 2023. Gina is introduced as part of the Knight family, who buy into The Queen Victoria pub, a focal setting in the soap. The family consist of patriarch George Knight (Colin Salmon), George's two daughters Gina and Anna Knight (Molly Rainford), and their pet Chihuahua, Tyson. George's partner Elaine Peacock (Harriet Thorpe), who is the mother of established character Linda Carter (Kellie Bright), is also introduced with the family.

== Tyson ==
Tyson
- EastEnders character
- Portrayed by: Spud (uncredited)
- Duration: 2023–2024
- First appearance: Episode 6714; 1 June 2023
- Last appearance: 24 December 2024
- Introduced by: Chris Clenshaw
- Breed: Chihuahua
In-universe information
- Owners: George Knight; Gina Knight; Anna Knight

Tyson is the pet Chihuahua of the Knight family who first appears in episode 6714, originally broadcast on 1 June 2023. The character was announced on 28 March 2023. Tyson is introduced with the family, who buy into The Queen Victoria pub, a focal setting in the soap. The family consist of patriarch George Knight (Colin Salmon), George's two daughters Gina Knight (Francesca Henry) and Anna Knight (Molly Rainford), and their pet Chihuahua, Tyson. George's partner Elaine Peacock (Harriet Thorpe), who is the mother of established character Linda Carter (Kellie Bright), is also introduced with the family.

Tyson is described as the family's "beloved" pet dog. Helen Daly from the Radio Times recognised that Tyson was an important part of the family. On the character, he wrote, "Tyson rarely leaves Anna's side and, in fact, has pride of place in her handbag when the family arrives in Walford!" When Anna left the series in December 2025, she mentioned she had taken Tyson to live with her friend Felicia off-screen, though by this point it had been almost a year since Tyson had made an on-screen appearance.

== Jasper Parrott ==
Jasper Parrott
- EastEnders character
- Portrayed by: Uncredited
- Duration: 2023–2024
- First appearance: Episode 6714; 13 June 2023
- Last appearance: Episode 6896; 23 April 2024
- Introduced by: Chris Clenshaw
- Breed: Green amazon parrot
In-universe information
- Owner: Tom "Rocky" Cotton

Jasper Parrott is the pet parrot of Tom "Rocky" Cotton (Brian Conley) who first appears in episode 6714, originally broadcast on 13 June 2023. Details about the character were reported on 13 May 2023. Jasper, named after the comedian Jasper Carrott, has been living with Rocky's estranged wife, Jo Cotton (Vicki Michelle), since Rocky left her. Michelle explained that Rocky and Jo bought Jasper together and loved him, but Rocky "really, really loved him". During supposed divorce proceedings between the couple, Jo uses Jasper as a tool to hurt Rocky; Michelle commented, "She's out for vengeance!" The character is referenced prior to his introduction with writers misleading the audience into believing Rocky has a secret son. Scriptwriter Sharon Marshall told Holly Willoughby and Craig Doyle on This Morning that there had been issues with the parrot swearing on-set, calling Conley inappropriate names and disrupting filming. Grace Morris from What to Watch observed that viewers predicted the character would be used to reveal "a major Walford secret".

Jo visits Rocky to hand him divorce papers and as she leaves, she mentions Jasper, shocking Rocky. Bobby Beale (Clay Milner Russell) overhears Rocky talking about Jo about "his boy" and assumes that Rocky has a son. He warns his grandmother, Kathy Beale (Gillian Taylforth), who is engaged to Rocky, about what he overheard. When Kathy confronts Rocky, he explains that Jasper is his parrot. Kathy then meets Jo and buys Jasper from her to surprise Rocky, who is delighted.

== DS Miles ==
DS Miles, played by Samantha Seager, first appears in episode 6714, originally broadcast on 13 June 2023. The character and Seager's casting details were announced on 9 June 2023. DS Miles is introduced as the detective sergeant investigating Suki Panesar's (Balvinder Sopal) fall after her husband, Nish Panesar (Navin Chowdhry) is suspected of attacking her. The character arrives at "a pivotal time" in the story. Seager was contracted for "several" episodes.

== Caz Johnston ==
Caz Johnston
- EastEnders character
- Portrayed by: Bryony Afferson
- First appearance: Episode 6749; 14 August 2023
- Last appearance: Episode 6754; 22 August 2023
- Introduced by: Chris Clenshaw

Caz Johnston, played by Bryony Afferson, first appears in episode 6749, originally broadcast on 14 August 2023. The character and Afferson's casting details were announced on 8 August 2023. Caz is introduced as a woman from Eve Unwin's (Heather Peace) backstory. Peace worked with producers to develop a new story for her character, which led to the introduction of Caz. Their shared backstory is revealed on-screen; Caz was responsible for the death of Eve's twin sister, Erica. She killed Erica in a dangerous driving then left the scene of the accident, resulting in a prison sentence. Peace described the character as "the most shocking person [Eve] could bump into".

Lewis Knight of the Radio Times reported that Caz would initially hide her identity from Eve, but when she reveals who she is, it would leave Eve "reeling". Peace explained that Caz's return causes buried emotions to resurface for Eve. When Caz meets Eve again, she reveals that she was drunk while driving the car. Writers used this reveal to create fresh trauma for Eve. Peace told Knight that the news "sends her into an absolute rage". The actress added that when the police decide not to reopen the case, Eve "decides to take matters into her own hands". The character departs in episode 6754, originally broadcast on 22 August 2023. After being attacked by Eve, Caz is told to leave and sent home in disgrace.

== Charli Slater ==
Charli Slater
- EastEnders character
- Portrayed by: Uncredited
- Duration: 2023–present
- First appearance: Episode 6762; 5 September 2023
- Introduced by: Chris Clenshaw
In-universe information
- Family: Branning/Mitchell/Slater
- Father: Ricky Branning
- Mother: Lily Slater
- Grandfathers: Ryan Malloy; Jack Branning; Martin Fowler (adoptive)
- Grandmothers: Stacey Slater; Sam Mitchell
- Uncles: James Branning; Arthur Fowler; Roman Allen (adoptive)
- Aunts: Penny Branning; Amy Mitchell; Hope Fowler; Bex Fowler (adoptive)
- First cousins: Ethan Branning-Panesar
- Other relatives: Jean Slater; Kat Slater; Zoe Slater; Freddie Slater; Max Branning; Lauren Branning; Oscar Branning; Annie Carter; Jasmine Fisher; Whitney Dean; Phil Mitchell; Ben Mitchell

Charli Branning Slater made her first appearance in episode 6762, originally broadcast on 5 September 2023. She is introduced as the new-born daughter of established characters Lily Slater (Lillia Turner) and Ricky Branning (Frankie Day). The character was devised as part of a story exploring teenage pregnancy. Writers named the character after the singer Charli XCX, who tweeted about the reference with the caption, "Shout out to my gays [sic] in the writers room!".

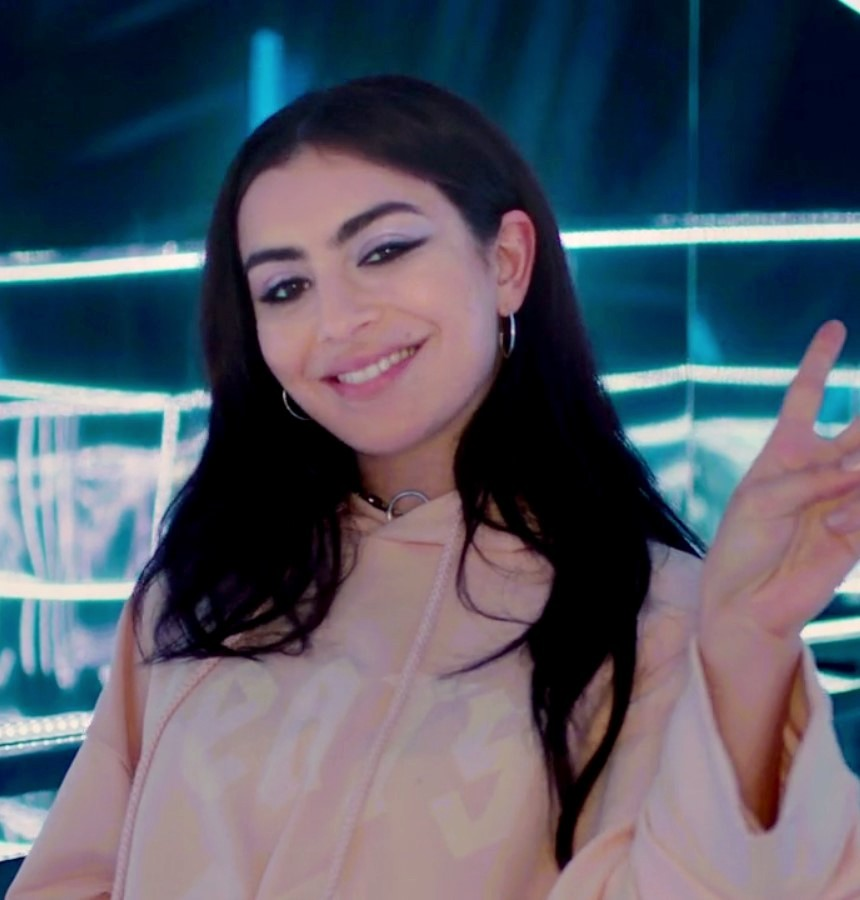
Charli is named after singer Charli XCX.

Charli is conceived in December 2022 following a one-night stand between pre-teens Lily and Ricky. On New Year's Day 2023, Lily is admitted to hospital alongside her mother Stacey Slater (Lacey Turner), grandmother Jean Slater (Gillian Wright) and Stacey's wife, Eve Unwin (Heather Peace), with carbon monoxide poisoning following a house party. A doctor later informs Stacey that Lily has fallen pregnant at twelve years of age. Lily later names Ricky as the father. Lily considers terminating the pregnancy but decides against it after a heart-to-heart with Kat Slater (Jessie Wallace).

In September 2023, 13-year-old Lily goes into labour whilst Stacey is held hostage in the kitchen after discovering the truth about her stalker Theo Hawthorne (William Ellis), and Charli is born at the Slater household after being delivered by Stacey and Jean. She is named after the singer Charli XCX and shares the name with her deceased relative Charlie Slater (Derek Martin). After her birth, Ricky announces that she is also being given the middle name Branning to honour his side of the family. Lily struggles with motherhood at first, though continues to be guided by her mother Stacey and grandmother Jean. Lily becomes stressed and shouts at Charli, but is later comforted by Kat, who shares her own experience of when she became pregnant as a teenager with Zoe Slater (Michelle Ryan).

== Dorian Gates ==
Dorian Gates
- EastEnders character
- Portrayed by: Luke J I Smith
- First appearance: Episode 6766; 12 September 2023
- Last appearance: Episode 6797; 6 November 2023
- Introduced by: Chris Clenshaw
In-universe information
- Occupation: Businessman

Dorian Gates, played by Luke J I Smith, is a boxing promoter who is put in contact with Sharon Watts (Letitia Dean), the owner of The Boxing Den boxing gym, by mutual friend George Knight (Colin Salmon). He first appeared in episode 6766, which originally aired on 12 September 2023. On 9 October 2023, nearly a month after his first appearance, The Mirror described his character to have "only been in Albert Square for five minutes but he's already caused quite a stir" and has "already made quite an impression on Albert Square residents since turning up to The Boxing Den to promote his fighters."

Dorian supports Sharon and George in arranging a "Pie, Pint and Punch Up" joint event between The Boxing Den and The Queen Victoria public house, which George owns. He disagrees with Sharon's business partner, Phil Mitchell (Steve McFadden), over his suggestion of using local boxers instead of his promising young boxers. Dorian and Sharon later meet for a drink and he tells her about how he began his multi-gym business empire in Abu Dhabi while raising his two toddlers. He suggests that she could get a job managing gyms in Abu Dhabi. Sharon updates Dorian on the plans for the event; she reminds him that they just need his fighters. He then reveals that he has a friend in Abu Dhabi who is looking for someone with experience to support him in setting up a gym there, and suggests Sharon considers it. Speaking to Radio Times, Dean said: "Dorian offers Sharon the chance to move to Abu Dhabi to set up shop in a new gym. It would obviously be a huge change for Sharon as Walford is her home, but with her relationship in tatters, I don't think she feels like there's much left to keep her there. It would be a great business move for her, and would offer security for Albie's future so it's very tempting." She added: "It would also make the breakup a lot easier if there were thousands of miles between them instead of living just across the Square from each other. Plus I think she'd be pleased to see the back of Karen for a while!"

Weeks later, Dorian, Sharon and George meet after the betting licence is secured. Dorian praises Sharon for getting press coverage of the event from the Walford Gazette newspaper. He suggests arranging catering for at the boxing gym, which Phil disagrees with, before inviting Sharon for a drink at The Queen Vic that evening; she agrees. At The Queen Vic, Dorian tells Sharon that the job in Abu Dhabi is still open and she can have it if she wants it. The following day, Dorian presents Sharon with flowers and reveals that he has passed her phone number onto his friend in Abu Dhabi; he then invites her for a coffee date. Dorian asks betting shop manager Olga Kubicka (Karolina Jelonek) to hand out flyers for the event to her customers. He gives a flyer to Tom "Rocky" Cotton (Brian Conley) and suggests he comes to the event. The next day, he invites Rocky and Harvey Monroe (Ross Boatman) to the event that night and tells them that there is an opportunity to place bets. At the event, he chats with George and offers Rocky a private bet on the fight. Dorian returns two weeks later after Sharon learns that he fixed the boxing match; she refuses to pay his finder's fee. When Keanu Taylor (Danny Walters) interrupts their conversation with a baseball bat, Dorian warns Sharon that he will return with his heavies to receive his money. He returns that evening with the heavies; Sharon gives the money and warns him not to return. Dorian threatens Sharon with harm against her and her son, Albie Watts (Arthur Gentleman), if the police contact him. When Albie is abducted the following week, Keanu suggests that Dorian may be responsible. Sharon then meets Dorian, who reveals that the police searched his home and car; he assures her that he is not responsible and explains that he does not involve children in his business.

== Nadine Keller ==
Nadine Keller
- EastEnders character
- Portrayed by: Jazzy Phoenix
- Duration: 2023–2024
- First appearance: Episode 6769; 18 September 2023
- Last appearance: Episode 6902; 2 May 2024
- Introduced by: Chris Clenshaw
In-universe information
- Occupation: Law student Sex worker

Nadine Keller, played by Jazzy Phoenix, first appears in episode 6769, originally broadcast on 18 September 2023. The character and Phoenix's casting details were announced on 12 September 2023. Nadine is introduced as a love interest for established character Jay Brown (Jamie Borthwick). She was billed as an "enigmatic" and "mysterious". The character forms part of a new story for Jay exploring his grief following the death of his wife, Lola Pearce-Brown (Danielle Harold). Phoenix and Harold share a resemblance, which was played on for the story. Borthwick enjoyed working with Phoenix and praised her professionalism. He added that Phoenix was keen not to replace Harold too.

Fans of the show began to theorise about the character following her introduction, with some suggesting that she may be a "figment of Jay's imagination". Although it was ruled out through Nadine's interactions with other characters, Borthwick liked the suggestion and thought it would have made an interesting plot. Writers developed the story when Jay begins paying Nadine to sleep with him non-sexually. They forge a friendship and she support him with his grief. The story was developed further when Nadine introduces Jay to ketamine. Borthwick enjoyed the new story and called it "a bit of a dark path". He liked how the story explored how characters respond to grief individually.

The character departed in episode 6788, originally broadcast on 19 October 2023. In March 2024, Phoenix shared an image of her with Patsy Kensit, who portrayed Lola's mother Emma Harding, sparking speculation that the pair may be returning to EastEnders together. Daniel Kilkelly of Digital Spy then confirmed that Phoenix had reprised her role for a short stint. Nadine returns in April 2024 as part of a new story for Jay. The details of the story were kept under embargo. Writers devised a plot where Nadine informs Jay that she is pregnant with his child. A twist in the story explains that Nadine is not pregnant and is scamming Jay for money. She is exposed and departs in episode 6902, originally broadcast on 2 May 2024.

== Priya Nandra-Hart ==
Priya Nandra-Hart, played by Sophie Khan Levy, first appears in episode 6789 broadcast on 16 October 2023. The character and Khan Levy's casting details were announced on 21 September 2023. Priya is introduced as the former girlfriend of established character Ravi Gulati (Aaron Thiara) and estranged mother of their son, Davinder "Nugget" Gulati (Juhaim Rasul Choudhury). The character was created alongside their daughter Avani Nandra-Hart (Aaliyah James), who arrives with her. In the character's backstory, Priya and Ravi shared a "doomed" relationship and after it ends, Priya learns that she is pregnant with Avani; Ravi does not know about his daughter upon their introduction.

== Avani Nandra-Hart ==
Avani Nandra-Hart
- EastEnders character
- Portrayed by: Aaliyah James
- Duration: 2023–present
- First appearance: Episode 6790; 17 October 2023
- Introduced by: Chris Clenshaw
In-universe information
- Occupation: Student
- Father: Ravi Gulati
- Mother: Priya Nandra-Hart
- Brothers: Davinder "Nugget" Gulati
- Grandfathers: Nish Panesar; Ranveer Gulati (adoptive)
- Uncles: Vinny Panesar; Kheerat Panesar; Jags Panesar
- Aunts: Ash Panesar
- First cousins: Tyrion Ahmed

Avani Nandra-Hart, played by Aaliyah James, first appears in episode 6790 broadcast on 17 October 2023. The character and James' casting details were announced on 21 September 2023. Avani is introduced as the estranged daughter of established character Ravi Gulati (Aaron Thiara) and sister of Davinder "Nugget" Gulati (Juhaim Rasul Choudhury). The character was created alongside her mother Priya Nandra-Hart (Sophie Khan Levy), who arrives with her. In the character's backstory, Priya became pregnant with Avani after the end of her relationship with Ravi, so he does not know about her existence upon her introduction.

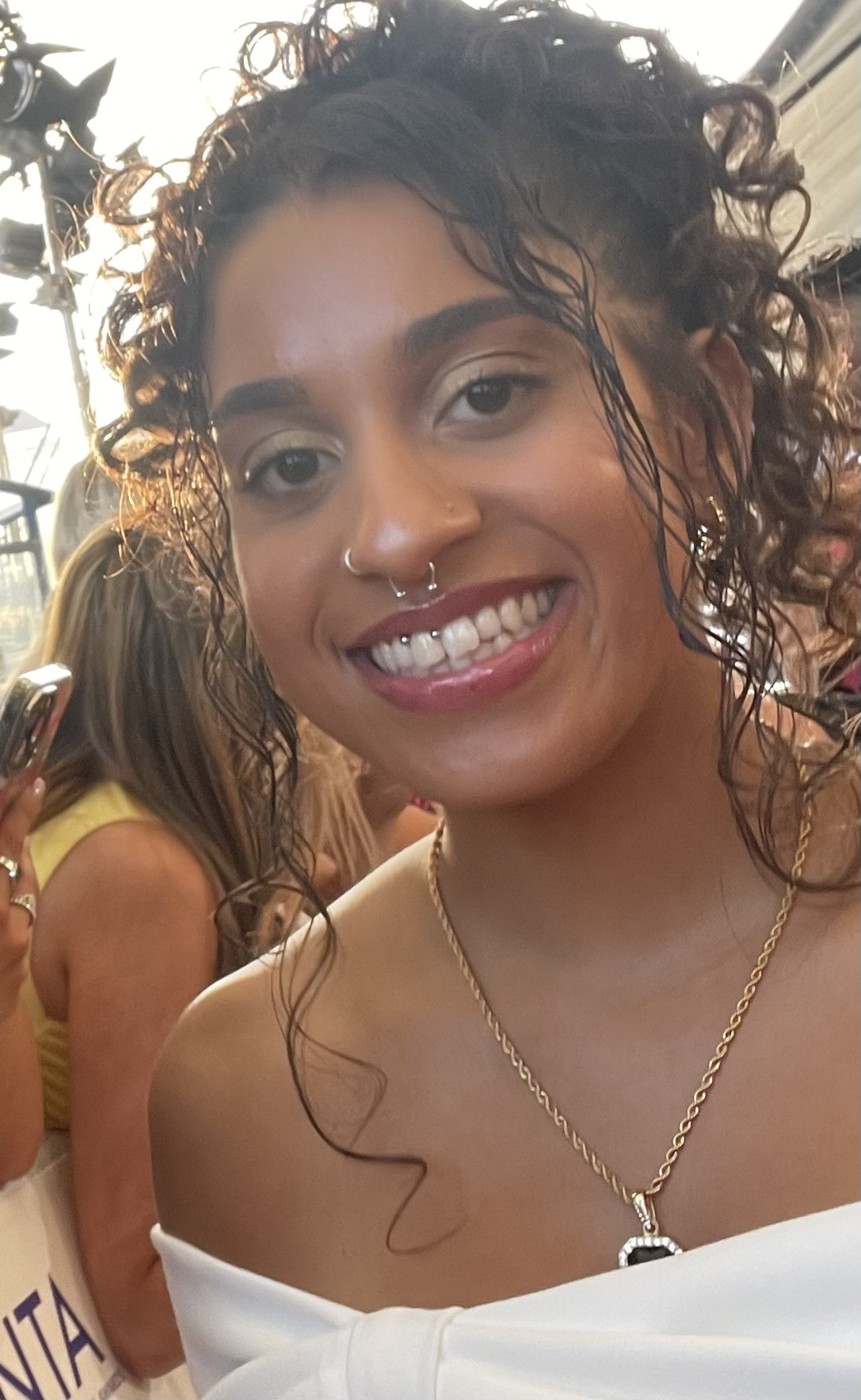
Aaliyah James portrays Avani Nandra-Hart.

EastEnders marks James' first acting role. She felt honoured to join the soap and was excited to portray Avani. Chris Clenshaw, the show's executive producer, was pleased with James and Khan Levy's casting and called their characters "two women guaranteed to cause big drama in Albert Square". He added that Avani's existence would be "a big shock to the system" for Ravi and would be challenging for him.

From Avani's first appearance, she is a fiery teenager who is sneaky and sly. She immediately bonds with Ravi and Nugget and is slowly getting used to a family routine with the Panesar family. After not being in school, she is signed up at Walford High along with Nugget. In March 2024, Priya starts to embark on a fling with long established character Martin Fowler (James Bye). They go for a date in Peggy's wine bar – much to Avani and Ravi's dismay. Avani wants Ravi and Priya to reconcile as she believes that there is still chemistry between the pair. Priya then arranges for the pair to have a date at home – they are disrupted by Ravi due to Avani's meddling in the situation. Avani tells Ravi that Priya is seriously ill so he would return home just before Martin arrives. They go on a second date in Walford East after Avani goes missing. The date is a disaster as Avani flirts with Martin, embarrasses Priya and then spills all of her drink jug over Martin.

In July 2025, Avani suspects she is pregnant with the child of Joel Marshall (Max Murray) and confides in her friend Barney Mitchell (Lewis Bridgeman). Her step-grandmother Suki Panesar (Balvinder Sopal) coerces her into giving her child to Suki and her wife Eve Unwin (Heather Peace) for money and Avani initially agrees but later tells Eve she wants an abortion. Eve supports her throughout this decision but Priya and Ravi sharply rebuke Suki for her duplicity and Joel is furious and physically threatens Avani in the square only to be prevented by his father's partner Vicki Fowler (Alice Haig).

== Pastor Clayton ==
Pastor Clayton
- EastEnders character
- Portrayed by: Howard Saddler
- Duration: 2023–2024
- First appearance: Episode 6823; 21 December 2023
- Last appearance: Episode 6989; 2 October 2024
- Introduced by: Chris Clenshaw
In-universe information
- Other names: Gideon Clayton
- Occupation: Pastor
- Wife: Stella Clayton

Gideon Clayton (credited as Pastor Clayton), played by Howard Saddler, first appears in episode 6823, originally broadcast on 21 December 2023. The character is introduced as the pastor of Yolande Trueman's (Angela Wynter) prayer group. Saddler previously appeared in the soap in 2002 as Doctor Daniel Rodford, a doctor treating Jamie Mitchell (Jack Ryder) before his death. Over multiple months, a friendship is established between Pastor Clayton and Yolande. Writers challenged the friendship through rumours about the pair's closeness. A show insider explained that other members of the prayer group start "making everyone think that something untoward is going on!"

The friendship between Pastor Clayton and Yolande serves as a build-up to a story exploring sexual harassment as Pastor Clayton abuses his position to make Yolande uncomfortable. When Yolande suggests that the church raise money for a food truck to deliver food to the homeless, the Pastor is impressed and gives Yolande a long hug. Alison Slade from TV Times observed that Pastor Clayton is "inappropriately over-tactile", leaving Yolande "frozen with fear". Yolande initially ignores the moment, but when Pastor Clayton touches her again, she confronts him. Writers established a villainous persona for the character by having him remove Yolande from the project and isolate her. A show publicity officer told Johnathon Hughes from Inside Soap that the pastor "manipulates the situation to paint [Yolande] as unreasonable". Through the story, Velile Tshabalala was introduced as Stella, the character's wife.

The plot develops further to explore the impact of sexual assault after Pastor Clayton assaults Yolande. Writers also establish the character as a serial offender through flashbacks of other women previously assaulted by him. The development was scripted as part of an hour-long special episode and the show's story team worked with End Violence Against Women Coalition and Hourglass to accurately portray the story. Chris Clenshaw, the show's executive producer, wanted the story to raise awareness about "how women at any age can be groomed by someone in a position of power". Veronica Gray, deputy CEO of Hourglass, called the story "a landmark moment for all older victims of abuse in the UK and beyond". She hoped it would create an open dialogue for the audience around the sexual abuse of older people. Andrea Simon, the director of End Violence Against Women Coalition, praised that marginalised groups were being portrayed in the story and hoped it would "dispel myths and stereotypes about what victims and survivors look like and how perpetrators behave". Hughes described the character as a "predatory pastor" and a "horrid holy man", while Slade called him "a double-dealing wolf in sheep's clothing". Hughes' colleague, Gary Gillatt, wrote of the character, "That Pastor Gideon is certainly keen on the old laying-on of hands, isn't he? He better not trespass against our Yolande".

After Yolande confides her friend Elaine Peacock (Harriet Thorpe) in the launderette in the evening of the day that Clayton assaulted her, Elaine tells Yolande's partner, Patrick Trueman (Rudolph Walker) over the phone with her permission, who later confronts Clayton and tries to attack him. The rest of her family are unaware of what Clayton has done when he conducts Jordan Fox's christening, until Yolande confronts him when he begins to behave inappropriately towards her. Yolande later reports Clayton to the police and then told the rest of her family. Denise Fox (Diane Parish) then goes around to confront Clayton herself, but he is arrested. Unfortunately, he wasn't charged initially due to lack of evidence. Yolande also confided in church elder and training pastor, Levi (Mark Akintimehin). Levi helps Yolande track down one of Clayton's other victims, Delia Bennett (Llewella Gideon), who was raped by Clayton in 2016. She reported it to authorities but they drop the case due to insufficient evidence, despite being believed by an officer named DC Carys. However, her reporting the assault ensured that the police knew about Clayton. Yolande and Delia both meet and hoped that the police would press charges if both came forward together. As a result, Clayton was charged in Episode 6931, which originally aired on 25 June 2024.

== Ashton ==
Ashton
- EastEnders character
- Portrayed by: Jensen Clayden
- Duration: 2023–2024
- First appearance: Episode 6824; 22 December 2023
- Last appearance: Episode 6832; 2 January 2024
- Introduced by: Chris Clenshaw
In-universe information
- Adoptive father: Zack Hudson (foster)
- Adoptive mother: Whitney Dean (foster)

Ashton, played by Jensen Clayden, is a young boy who is temporarily fostered by Zack Hudson (James Farrar) and Whitney Dean (Shona McGarty). He appears between Episode 6824, originally airing on 22 December 2023, and Episode 6832, originally airing on 2 January 2024. The character's casting and details were announced on 19 December 2023 by Radio Times. His introduction was part of Whitney's exit storyline, as McGarty had announced her departure of Whitney after 15 years in July 2023 and would depart the following year. After she terminated her pregnancy as her unborn baby, Peach had Edward's Syndrome, Whitney and Zack turned to fostering. Executive producer Chris Clenshaw described Ashton's arrival: "[Whitney] and Zack have a big storyline at the beginning of the year and they get a lovely, little Christmas/New Year miracle." They were however, set to face some "further potential heartache during the festive season."

When he first arrives, Ashton is withdrawn but smiles when Zack gives him an apple. On Christmas Day, they attend the wedding of Zack's sister, Sharon Watts (Letitia Dean) to Keanu Taylor (Danny Walters). When Ashton hears police sirens at night, he becomes distressed, so Whitney offers to stay with him until he falls asleep. The following day, Whitney speaks to social care about Ashton's nightmares; they explain that Ashton's father was in prison frequently and he had lots of experiences with the police. Later that day, Zack sets up a fort in the house for Ashton. He explains his experience with foster care and suggests that they can paint in the den and sleep there if he feels better. They then design a superhero named "Zebra Man", which Zack dresses up as. Ashton suffers an allergic reaction, so Sonia Fowler (Natalie Cassidy) checks on him and finds that he has had a mild reaction to some food colouring as he is allergic to tartrazine. Whitney and Zack later explain to Ashton that his social worker, Yasmin (Courtney Bowman), will be collecting him the following morning to take him to a new family with a big house and two dogs. Ashton worries that they do not like him anymore, but they reassure him that is not true. Whitney and Ashton go to Sonia's house for a New Year's Eve party, but leave when he falls asleep. The next day, Yasmin collects Ashton and he says goodbye to Whitney and Zack.

== Other characters ==
Character	Episode date(s)	Actor	Circumstances
Josie	1 January − 3 May (2 episodes)	Sabrina Puri	A paramedic who treats Jean Slater (Gillian Wright) at 31 Albert Square following a collapse. She suspects carbon monoxide poisoning and asks for the house to be evacuated. Josie later admits Keanu Taylor (Danny Walters) to hospital with a suspected collapsed lung after he is attacked.
Doctor Saed	1 January	Walles Hamonde	A doctor who treats carbon monoxide poisoning victims from 31 Albert Square. He tells Stacey Slater (Lacey Turner) where her mother, Jean Slater (Gillian Wright), and daughter, Lily Slater (Lillia Turner), are being treated. Doctor Saed also treats Lily and informs Stacey that Lily is pregnant.
Holly Riley	2 January – 7 September (4 episodes)	Lauren Drennan	A social worker who leads an investigation into the pregnancy of 12-year-old Lily Slater (Lillia Turner). She is present when Lily's mother, Stacey Slater (Lacey Turner), tells Lily that she is pregnant, until she is asked to leave. Holly and DC Sally Booth (Sanchia McCormack) visit Lily's stepfather, Martin Fowler (James Bye), to discuss Lily's pregnancy, unaware that he does not know about it. They later visit the men who live with Lily: Freddie Slater (Bobby Brazier) and Alfie Moon (Shane Richie); Freddie becomes defensive about the questioning and worries they believe he is the father of the baby. Holly and DC Booth are concerned to learn Stacey knows who the father is and explain that they may have to take Lily into police protection to safeguard her. Holly and DC Booth reach an agreement with Stacey to have no men living in the house with Lily. When they visit again, they encourage Stacey to tell them the truth and explain they need to inform the father for safeguarding measures. Lily interrupts their meeting and nearly tells them, but becomes upset, so Holly and DC Booth leave. After Lily gives birth, Holly and her colleague Naz Cohen (Buckso Dhillion-Woolley) meet with her and Stacey for their discharge meeting. Holly informs them that Lily's daughter, Charli Slater, has been declared medically fit and can be discharged from hospital. She adds that they will have routinely meetings every ten days.
DC Robertson	20 January	Paul Ham	Two detective constables who bring Linda Carter (Kellie Bright) a washed up wallet belonging to her missing husband Mick Carter (Danny Dyer).
DC Pembrook	20 January	Uncredited	Two detective constables who bring Linda Carter (Kellie Bright) a washed up wallet belonging to her missing husband Mick Carter (Danny Dyer).
Emma Pearce	20 January	Florence Andrews	A woman who meets with Billy Mitchell (Perry Fenwick) after he posts an advert looking for Emma Pearce, the mother of Lola Pearce (Danielle Harold). Billy realises that Emma is referencing a cat and tries to explain, but Emma becomes annoyed and leaves. Honey Mitchell (Emma Barton) later points out to Billy that he posted the advert in the pets section.
Nurse Freya	1 February	Nicole Dayes	A nurse who performs a sonogram on Whitney Dean's (Shona McGarty) unborn baby after she experiences vaginal bleeding. She becomes concerned when looking at the scan and seeks advice from Dr Lane (Gemma Page).
Dr Lane	1–6 February (2 episodes)	Gemma Page	A doctor who informs Whitney Dean (Shona McGarty) that her unborn baby has omphalocele and requires surgery after birth. She offers Whitney a test to check the severity of the condition and explains that the baby may not survive. Dr Lane meets with Whitney and Zack Hudson (James Farrar), the baby's father, and answers their questions. She later informs the couple that their baby has Edwards' syndrome and will likely die before or shortly after birth if brought to full term.
Maisie Jenkins	2 February	Milly Playle	A Walford Primary classmate of Lexi Pearce (Isabella Brown) who is bullying her over her mother Lola Pearce-Brown's (Danielle Harold) online vlogs. When Lola's mother, Emma Harding (Patsy Kensit), learns about the bullying, she goes to Walford Primary and threatens Maisie.
Ms Reynolds	6 February	Janet Walker	The teacher of Lexi Pearce (Isabella Brown) who meets with Lexi's mother, Lola Pearce-Brown (Danielle Harold), after Lexi's classmate, Maisie Jenkins (Milly Playle), is threatened by Emma Harding (Patsy Kensit). Ms Reynolds is unaware who threatened Maisie and suggests that it could be someone connected to Lexi. She reassures Lola that the school want to support her and Lexi, but also suggests that Lola may have a stalker from her online vlogs.
Deborah	27 February	Alison Spittle	A heavily pregnant woman who Whitney Dean (Shona McGarty) and Zack Hudson (James Farrar) meet at the hospital. She talks about her family life and makes the pair laugh.
Casey Quinnan	27 February − 3 March (2 episodes)	Emma Prendergast	A journalist for the Walford Gazette who interviews Denzel Danes (Jaden Ladega) about his essay detailing his grandparents' love story. However, Denzel has forged the story from a television drama. Casey is impressed by the essay and asks to interview Denzel's grandparents, which he agrees to. Casey later interviews Patrick Trueman (Rudolph Walker) and Vi Highway (Gwen Taylor), who are pretending to be Denzel's grandparents. She takes a picture of them kissing and then decides to turn it into a bigger article with a follow-up interview. She also offers Patrick and Vi dinner at a Michelin-starred restaurant.
Nurse Lynsey	27 February 2023 − 16 May 2024 (4 episodes)	Kathryn Bond	A nurse who explains the process of a termination to Whitney Dean (Shona McGarty), whose baby has Edwards' syndrome and will not survive birth. She then supports Whitney and Zack Hudson (James Farrar) through the birth of their baby and delivers their daughter, Peach. Lynsey then offers Whitney and Zack a memory box for Peach and explains that they will not receive a birth certificate because Peach is less than 24 weeks old. When Zack leaves the room upset, Lynsey comforts Whitney and encourages her to look after herself. Whitney blames herself for Peach's death and confides in Lynsey about her last miscarriage, sharing her concerns about any future children. Lynsey then admits that she became pregnant on her last cycle of IVF, but miscarried at seven weeks; after this, she adopted two boys. Whitney and Zack say goodbye to Peach and Lynsey takes her away. Over a year later, Lynsey, who is now pregnant, treats Whitney when she goes into labour. Whitney worries that her unborn baby will die like Peach, but Lynsey supports her. She delivers Whitney and Zack's daughter, Dolly Dean-Hudson.
Elliott	6 March	Nikolas Salmon	A fourth-time father who Zack Hudson (James Farrar), whose newborn daughter has died, meets in the hospital chapel. Elliott upsets Zack talking about his experiences, before asking about Zack's daughter. When Elliott discusses Peach as a teenager, Zack becomes upset and tells Elliott that Peach is dead. The pair then talk and Elliott encourages Zack to support his partner, Whitney Dean (Shona McGarty), as she will feel similar to him.
Alan Cope	9–14 March (3 episodes)	Jamie Baughan	A security guard at the Botton & Harper corporate offices that Stacey Slater (Lacey Turner) and Jean Slater (Gillian Wright) clean. He acts creepy towards Stacey and tells her about living with his mother. When Stacey and Jean finish cleaning, Alan informs them that they need to clean the floor above too. At the end of the shift, Stacey steals some money from an unlocked cashbox. At their next shift, Jean distracts Alan whilst Stacey goes to return the money. However, Alan finds Stacey returning the money and questions her. He encourages Stacey to take the money in return for being friends with him and going for dinner. When Alan tries to kiss her, Stacey kicks him in defence and runs; he reports her to the police for common assault and theft. The next day, Stacey visits Alan at work. She threatens to inform his mother about sexually harassing her if he does not withdraw his allegation; he does so.
Dr Washington	15 March − 25 May (4 episodes)	Amanda Gordon	An oncologist treating Lola Pearce-Brown (Danielle Harold) for her terminal brain tumour. Lola and her mother, Emma Harding (Patsy Kensit), attend an appointment with Dr Washington after Lola experiences headaches and memory loss. She explains that Lola's chemotherapy may not be working and her tumour may be growing. Following an MRI scan, Dr Washington informs Lola and her husband, Jay Brown (Jamie Borthwick), that Lola's tumour has advanced and she has a maximum of six months left to live. She recommends that Lola look into palliative treatment. Lola is admitted to hospital after collapsing; Dr Washington and Alex (Ciara Pouncett), a palliative care nurse, inform her that her palliative treatment has not worked and the tumour has spread again, causing swelling. Dr Washington confirms that they cannot provide any further treatment and Lola has weeks left to live. Dr Washington meets with Lola's relative, Ben Mitchell (Max Bowden), who is struggling to cope with her terminal diagnosis. He asks her about experimental treatments which would require travelling abroad, but she warns him that Lola is too ill for any travel. Dr Washington questions whether Lola knows about Ben's plans and realises that Ben wants Lola to be alive for their daughter Lexi Pearce's (Isabella Brown) first day at secondary school.
Shanti	15 March	Rameet Rauli	A married woman on a hen do who chats to Jay Brown (Jamie Borthwick) in Peggy's nightclub. Jay tells Shanti about his wife, Lola Pearce-Brown (Danielle Harold), which is partially overseen by Lola's mother, Emma Harding (Patsy Kensit), who believes that Jay is cheating.
Dr Shaw	21 March	Declan O'Connor	A doctor who has an appointment with Zack Hudson (James Farrar) about his HIV treatment. He informs Zack that his viral load is reducing and should be undetectable in five months. Dr Shaw answers questions that Zack and his friend, Sam Mitchell (Kim Medcalf), have about his ability to have unprotected sex and children, and explains to them about PrEP.
Jessie	3–4 April (2 episodes)	Amelia Grace Pin	A woman who agrees to go on a date with Freddie Slater (Bobby Brazier) at The Queen Victoria pub. Freddie realises that he has also arranged a date with Becca (Caitlin Hamilton) for the same night and decides to attend both. Jessie arrives at the pub and overhears Freddie becoming flustered and talking about arranging two dates; she becomes annoyed and leaves.
Becca	3 April	Caitlin Hamilton	A woman who has arranged a date with Freddie Slater (Bobby Brazier) at The Queen Victoria pub. Freddie forgets about the date and books another date with Jessie (Amelia Grace Pin) for the same night. They bond over reading, but Freddie references his date with Jessie, causing him to confess about both dates to Becca.
Dr Freeman	4–5 April (2 episodes)	Ian Saynor	A doctor treating Denzel Danes (Jaden Ladega) following his car crash. He tells Denzel's father, Howie Danes (Delroy Atkinson), that he has internal bleeding and a ruptured spleen and will need an operation. Dr Freeman reassures Howie before Denzel's operation and afterwards, he informs Howie that he should make a full recovery.
Nurse Julian	4 April	Gus Gordon	A nurse treating Kim Fox (Tameka Empson) following her car crash. He recognises Kim as an influencer on TikTok and says he will tell his flatmates about meeting her.
DC Webber	6 April	Shamia Chalabi	A detective constable interviewing Ravi Gulati (Aaron Thiara) following his arrest for possession of stolen goods. Ravi declines to answer any questions, so she pauses the interview until after a search of Ravi's house.
Arjun	11 April	Mihir Pandya	A former business associate of Phil Mitchell (Steve McFadden) who meets with Nish Panesar (Navin Chowdhry), his wife Suki Panesar (Balvinder Sopal), their son Vinny Panesar (Shiv Jalota), and their lawyer Eve Unwin (Heather Peace), after Nish takes over Phil's money laundering businesses. Nish proposes a 10% cut of Arjun's business, but is overridden by Suki, Eve and Vinny who demand 15%. Vinny has researched Arjun and lists his collapsing businesses, which prompts Arjun to accept their deal.
Kieran	24 April	Michael Lyle	A counsellor who has an appointment with Amy Mitchell (Ellie Dadd) after she nearly self-harms again. Amy's father, Jack Branning (Scott Maslen), also attends the session and is surprised when his estranged wife, Denise Fox (Diane Parish), joins them late, having been invited by Amy. Kieran invites Denise to stay after recognising her importance to Amy, before suggesting a family therapy session.
Yvette	27 April	Rachel Lumburg	A family therapist who leads a session for the Branning family: Jack Branning (Scott Maslen), his wife Denise Fox (Diane Parish), and Jack's children Amy Mitchell (Ellie Dadd) and Ricky Mitchell (Frankie Day). She leads a discussion on Denise's affair and listens to the family's responses. Yvette encourages Ricky to share his opinion, which leads him to admit his feelings surrounding Amy's self-harming. She then starts a conversation with Amy about the deaths of her mother and aunt, Roxy Mitchell (Rita Simons) and Ronnie Branning (Samantha Womack); she asks Amy to imagine a conversation with Roxy, which causes Amy to hallucinate her mother.
Christos	27 April	Alexander Theo	A criminal associate of Ravi Gulati (Aaron Thiara) who contacts him via telephone regarding their illegal crimes. After Ravi hires Keanu Taylor (Danny Walters) to help him transport stolen goods, Christos visits him under the guise of being a detective sergeant. Christos asks to see what is inside the boxes Keanu is moving, but he tells him that he needs a search warrant. Keanu warns Ravi, so they hide the boxes inside the restaurant and are caught by Christos; Ravi is unaware of his identity until Christos reveals it. He then invites Ravi and Keanu onto a two-person job that afternoon. Christos and Ravi meet that evening, where Ravi criticises Christos for not mentioning they were transporting cocaine and demands for a greater reward. When Ravi mentions that Keanu is not happy, Christos warns Ravi to keep Keanu under control.
Dr Ping	3 May	Jan Le	A doctor who treats Keanu Taylor (Danny Walters) after he is attacked. She explains to his mother, Karen Taylor (Lorraine Stanley), that he has a collapsed left lung.
Judge Ali	10 May	Patrick Bridgman	The judge at Kim Fox's (Tameka Empson) trial for dangerous driving, where she pleads guilty. The CPS solicitor (Gurkiran Kaur) informs the judge about Kim's past driving offence, her poor driving on the day of the crash and use of a mobile phone. She suggests that the court refer the case to Crown Court for a more severe sentencing; he agrees and releases Kim on unconditional bail with a driving ban effective immediately.
Jameson	10 May − 3 July (3 episodes)	Marlon G. Day	The solicitor of Kim Fox (Tameka Empson) who represents her during her dangerous driving trial. He is clumsy and confuses Kim's case with another case. When Kim's case is referred to Crown Court, he apologises and tells her to agree to the judge's decision. Jameson visits Kim before her trial and suggests that Denzel Danes (Jaden Ladega), who was in the car with Kim when she crashed, provide a character statement at the trial. Kim is against Denzel being in court, but her partner and Denzel's dad, Howie Danes (Delroy Atkinson), thinks it is a good idea. At the trial, Jameson requests that Denzel reads his statement first. Kim has a panic attack on the stand, so Howie and her sister, Denise Fox (Diane Parish), tell Jameson to have the trial paused, which he attempts to do. He explains to Judge Ruth Dawson (Avril Clark) that Kim suffers from panic attack but has no medical evidence, so the judge has her arrested and imprisoned.
Alex	17–18 May (2 episodes)	Patrick Bridgman	A palliative care nurse who treats Lola Pearce-Brown (Danielle Harold), who has a terminal brain tumour, after she collapses. Alex and Lola's oncologist, Dr Washington (Amanda Gordon), inform Lola that her palliative treatment has not worked and the tumour has spread again, causing swelling. After Dr Washington confirms that Lola has weeks left to live, Alex states that they will be happy to discuss end-of-life care when Lola is ready. When Lola and her husband Jay Brown (Jamie Borthwick) go for a final day trip to Margate, Alex reprimands Jay and explains that Lola is terminally ill and at increased risk of infection and seizures.
Suzanne	22 May − 27 June (5 episodes)	Endy McKay	A nurse who provides palliative care for Lola Pearce-Brown (Danielle Harold), who has a terminal brain tumour, at home. She explains that she will appear twice a day to check on Lola and will provide all of Lola's care. Suzanne reassures Lola's family about the end-of-life care she will receive. On another visit, Suzanne informs Lola's husband, Jay Brown (Jamie Borthwick), that she will die in the coming days. The next day, she encourages the family to say goodbye to Lola while she can understand them. When visiting Lola again, Suzanne supports Jay as he prepares to say goodbye. Suzanne later attends Lola's funeral.
Sophia Coates	23 May	Serina Mathew	A parent of a Walford High School child who attends a parent committee meeting. She clashes with Stacey Slater (Lacey Turner) over her account on SecretCam, an OnlyFans-inspired platform. Sophia comments on her child being exposed to Stacey's account and the pregnancy of Stacey's daughter, Lily Slater (Lillia Turner), so Stacey defends herself and Lily and blames the cruelty of children on their parents' views. Stacey also suggests that Sophia's husband may have accessed her SecretCam account as a credit card is required.
Dr Diane Greene	25 May − 13 June (2 episodes)	Margaret Cabourn-Smith	A therapist with a specialism in attention deficit hyperactivity disorder (ADHD) who has a chat with Freddie Slater (Bobby Brazier), who is undergoing a possible diagnosis for ADHD. Diane lists some symptoms of ADHD which Freddie relates with, so he agrees to be tested for ADHD. Diane meets with Freddie, Jean Slater (Gillian Wright) and Theo Hawthorne (William Ellis) to discuss the results of Freddie's assessment. She diagnoses Freddie with ADHD and begins him on methylphenidate.
Adele	30 May	Jenna Boyd	A customer at Fox & Hair salon who recognises Kim Fox (Tameka Empson) from her social media influencer account, the Foxcatcher. She explains that her and her daughter Lottie are fans of her account. Kim gives Adele a manicure as she tells her a story, but Kim does not listen. Adele asks Kim to record a video for Lottie's birthday; an uncomfortable Kim records the message but forgets Lottie's name. Kim then leaves and has a panic attack as Kim's sister, Denise Fox (Diane Parish), explains to Adele that their friend is very ill and it is affecting Kim.
Sergeant Nathan Piper	30 May	Paul Brown	A desk sergeant who speaks to Honey Mitchell (Emma Barton) about her husband, Billy Mitchell's (Perry Fenwick), release from police custody. She apologises for insulting him over the telephone. Billy's cousin, Phil Mitchell (Steve McFadden), asks to speak to Jack Branning (Scott Maslen), a detective inspector; as Nathan tells him that Jack is busy, Jack appears to speak to them.
Dr Burns	8 June	Hugh Stubbins	A doctor treating Suki Panesar (Balvinder Sopal) after a fall down stairs. He informs her that she has fractured ribs.
DCI Mary Nicholls	20 June − 29 August (3 episodes)	Penny Layden	A Detective Chief Inspector from the serious crime operations unit who visits police officer Callum Highway (Tony Clay) at his home after he searches for Rose Knight on the police system. She gives him a warning and tells him to forget about Rose. Two days later, Mary visits Cindy Beale (Michelle Collins), who has been using the Rose Knight alias, in France. It emerges that Cindy has been in witness protection since 1998 and Mary has been her liaison officer since then. Mary announces that Jackie Ford, her former cellmate, has died, meaning Cindy's witness protection is now over. They hug and say goodbye. In a flashback to 2014, Mary informs Cindy that her daughter, Lucy Beale (Hetti Bywater), has died. Mary then finds Cindy hiding in Albert Square, watching her former husband Ian Beale (Adam Woodyatt) from afar. She orders Cindy into her car and drives her away from the Square. Mary warns her that she is not allowed within 500 miles of Walford. They are interrupted by Fatboy (Ricky Norwood) asking the time. When Cindy suggests returning to Walford, Mary reminds her that the Ford family may look for her there. She then explains that Cindy has compromised her protection in Marbella and it may be unsafe for her or her family if she was return to Marbella.
Dr Alain Martin	22 June	Eric Geynes	A doctor who treats Ian Beale (Adam Woodyatt) in a French hospital following a heart attack. He speaks to Ian's partner, Cindy Beale (Michelle Collins), about his condition and reassures her that he will recover.
Allie	27 June	Eric Geynes	A woman who attends Lola Pearce-Brown's (Danielle Harold) funeral. She explains that she watched Lola's vlogs, where she recognised having similar symptoms to Lola. Allie visited the doctor, who diagnosed her with a benign brain tumour. She credits Lola with saving her life.
Nick	28 June − 31 July (2 episodes)	Dan Burgess	A drug dealer who deals to Gina Knight (Francesca Henry) in the wine bar Peggy's. He later sees Gina at The Prince Albert bar and offers her and Jay Brown (Jamie Borthwick) some drugs.
Mr Roy	3 July	John Nayagam	The prosecuting lawyer at Kim Fox's (Tameka Empson) trial for dangerous driving. He presents CCTV footage of the crash, which causes Kim to have a panic attack.
Judge Ruth Dawson	3 July	Avril Clark	The judge at Kim Fox's (Tameka Empson) trial for dangerous driving. On the stand, Kim has a panic attack and struggles to breathe, attempting to leave the stand. The judge warns Kim that she is in contempt of court, despite protests from Kim's family. Kim's solicitor, Jameson (Marlon G. Day), explains that Kim suffers from panic attacks, but when he cannot provide medical evidence, the judge has her arrested. She adds that she will be imprisoned until evidence can be provided.
Becky	4 July	Esmée Cook	A social worker leading a family group conference for the baby of teenagers Lily Slater (Lillia Turner) and Ricky Mitchell (Frankie Day), which is attended by them and their parents. As a group, they devise a plan to support the baby, Lily and Ricky when it arrives.
Daisy	5 July	Laura Lake Adebisi	A woman attending a party hosted by Whitney Dean (Shona McGarty), Zack Hudson (James Farrar) and Chelsea Fox (Zaraah Abrahams). She flirts with Ravi Gulati (Aaron Thiara), who is trying to make Chelsea jealous. As Daisy prepares to leave with Ravi, Chelsea warns her that he is using her to make her jealous. Daisy rebuffs Ravi and calls him "sleazy".
Gemma	5 July − 4 September (2 episodes)	Nicola May-Taylor	A receptionist at a secondary school where Theo Hawthorne (William Ellis) previously taught. Martin Fowler (James Bye) visits the school and asks Gemma if he can speak with the headteacher about Theo. Gemma informs Martin that the headteacher is unavailable, and warns him to stay away from Theo as he created trouble at the school. When Martin returns home, he explains that Gemma told him that Theo was about to be investigated for having an inappropriate relationship, but that he left before the investigation commenced. Gemma later meets up with Martin and Eve Unwin (Heather Peace) to discuss Theo. She explains that Theo was in a relationship with her best friend and became obsessive when she ended it; he continued to follow her, send her messages and presents, and threaten to publish personal images online. Gemma tells them that it lasted a year and concluded with her depression and suicide.
Prison Officer Olu	10 July	Oliver Asante	A prison officer who hands Kim Fox (Tameka Empson) a letter ahead of her release from prison.
Tess Tickles	13 July − 13 December (2 episodes)	Lydia Piechowiak	An exotic dancer hired to perform at Tom "Rocky" Cotton's (Brian Conley) stag do. She trips and injures her ankle, so she cannot perform. She is hired again to perform at Keanu Taylor's (Danny Walters stag do.
DS Ashton	13 July	Olivia Dowd	A detective sergeant who asks to speak to Lisa Fowler (Lucy Benjamin) following a theft at Peggy's wine bar.
Dr Anwar	25 July	Cosh Omar	A therapist who Kim Fox (Tameka Empson) has a session with to support her with her post-traumatic stress disorder (PTSD) and anxiety. He encourages her not to hide behind her Kimfluencer persona. Kim asks that her partner, Howie Danes (Delroy Atkinson), is present to support her. Dr Anwar suggests some CBT techniques to support Kim and encourages her to rationalise her thoughts with logic.
Mike	25 July	Donnavan Yates	A man drinking in The Queen Victoria pub with his friends. He is approached by a drunk Martin Fowler (James Bye), who accuses him of leering at women and threatens him. The pair fight and are thrown out of the pub by the landlord, George Knight (Colin Salmon).
Olga Kubicka	27 July − 8 November (7 episodes)	Karolina Jelonek	The manager of Heart Bet betting shop, where Alfie Moon (Shane Richie) has been hired. He makes a bad first impression when he assumes Olga is not the manager and refuses her help with the computer system while serving customers. Alfie finds Olga's young age intimidating. He impresses her on his first day by resolving a staged argument between Patrick Trueman (Rudolph Walker) and Freddie Slater (Bobby Brazier). Olga later gives Alfie instructions on looking after the shop while she is on a training course and has doubts about leaving him on his own. When she returns, she finds Alfie telling Freddie and Ernie Moon (Cody Briffett) to leave the premises. Olga then appears serving Tom "Rocky" Cotton (Brian Conley) at the betting shop. The following day, she serves him again and suggests he use online betting if he wants to avoid being caught gambling. At the betting shop, Olga agrees to hand out Dorian Gates' (Luke J I Smith) flyers for an upcoming event at the local gym. The following month, Olga refuses to serve Rocky due to fears he may have a gambling addiction. She later agrees to serve Rocky and he experiences a series of wins.
Gabriel Chang	1–17 August (3 episodes)	Jon Chew	A private investigator who is hired by Anna Knight (Molly Rainford) to find her estranged mother, Rose Knight. She shows him Rose's necklace and he collects notes from Anna. Gabriel visits Anna at The Queen Victoria pub and informs her that he has more information, but she sends him away to avoid her family overhearing. The next day, Gabriel and Anna meet in the park. He shares that Rose's bank account in Spain was closed down the previous week and that she is still alive. Anna then contacts Gabriel to close the investigation. Gabriel later contacts Anna with more information about her mother. They meet and Gabriel hands Anna an active phone number belonging to her mother. He explains that it has been triangulated is being used in France.
Greg	1 August	Jack Bence	A man who flirts with Stacey Slater (Lacey Turner) in The Prince Albert bar during a football match. Stacey is uninterested in his advances and tells him that she has a wife. Greg continues to pursue Stacey, so Theo Hawthorne (William Ellis) intervenes and sends him away.
Saira	10 August	Krissi Bohn	A medical counsellor who assesses Ben Mitchell (Max Bowden) for counselling after he is raped. She allows Kat Slater (Jessie Wallace) to stay for the assessment to make Ben feel more at ease. Saira recommends Ben for group counselling and offers him a slot in a session the following week.
Perry Griffin	14–15 August (2 episodes)	Logan Clark	A friend of Tommy Moon (Sonny Kendall) who he meets with some others in the park. Perry brings a bottle of vodka, which he offers to Tommy. Tommy's father, Alfie Moon (Shane Richie), checks on Tommy at the park and spots the vodka. He takes it from Tommy, reprimanding him for underage drinking and ordering him home; Perry makes fun of Tommy for this. The following day, Perry and his friends see Tommy in the café with Freddie Slater (Bobby Brazier). They mock Tommy until Freddie realises that he knows Perry's older sister, Stella Griffin. He embarrasses Perry in front of his friends by revealing that he and Stella dance together.
Dr Garcia	15 August	Stuart Neal	A doctor at The Panesar House Surgery who treats Suki Panesar (Balvinder Sopal) after she experiences dizziness. He suggests that it may be caused be heat, exhaustion or dehydration, or that it may be a symptom of mental fatigue, stress or anxiety. She dismisses his concerns, but he decides to write her a prescription that she can opt to use if she wishes.
Dr Hilton	15 August	Alan Ruscoe	A doctor who informs Alfie Moon (Shane Richie) that he may have prostate cancer and that he needs to be referred to urology for further testing to confirm.
Paddy Barber	15 August	Uncredited	A boxing student at Walford Boxing School who spars Tommy Moon (Sonny Kendall).
Dr Dutta	16 August	Ben Sura	A doctor who informs Alfie Moon (Shane Richie) that his scans and PSA test indicates that he has prostate cancer and will require a further MRI scan and biopsy.
Naz Cohen	17 August – 30 January 2024 (4 episodes)	Buckso Dhillion-Woolley	A social worker supporting Lily Slater (Lillia Turner) with her teenage pregnancy. She visits Lily's home to assess its suitability. Lily's mother, Stacey Slater (Lacey Turner), is anxious about the assessment, especially after her wife Eve Unwin (Heather Peace) trashes the kitchen. They distract Naz by having Lily show her the things they have bought for the baby. Naz is pleased with her findings and the support in the home, and praises Stacey before leaving. After Lily gives birth, Naz and her colleague Holly Riley (Lauren Drennan) meet with her and Stacey for their discharge meeting. The following week, Naz visits Lily at home to monitor how she and her daughter, Charli Slater, are coping. Four months later, Naz attends the special guardianship order hearing for Charli. She reassures Lily about the hearing and supports the family.
DCI Croft	22 August	Safron Beck	A detective chief inspector who meets with Eve Unwin (Heather Peace) to discuss new evidence contributing to the murder of her sister, Erica Unwin. She informs Eve that the case will not be reopened.
Arlo Fernandez	22 August	Renato de Fazio	An estate agent who oversees a For Sale sign being installed at Beale's Plaice fish and chip shop. When Bobby Beale (Clay Milner Russell) protests the sign's installation, Arlo informs him that his grandmother, Kathy Cotton (Gillian Taylforth), has decided to sell the shop.
Anton	22−24 August (2 episodes)	Cavin Cornwall	The former partner of Yolande Trueman (Angela Wynter), who has recently left him for her former husband Patrick Trueman (Rudolph Walker). Anton follows Yolande to Walford after she avoids his phone calls. He is surprised to meet Patrick and they argue, but are stopped by Yolande. Anton visits Yolande at Patrick's house and asks her to leave with him. He tells her that he will return the next day. Anton and Yolande meet the following day; he tries to persuade her to return to Birmingham with him. Yolande returns home and explains to Patrick that Anton tricked her into revealing the passcode for the church safe and then stole the money. Patrick invites Anton to the house and records him confessing to the crime. Anton leaves after Patrick threatens to go to the police with it.
Alex	24 August	Tony Metcalfe	A radiographer who takes Alfie Moon (Shane Richie) for a scan.
Dr Harris	31 August	Judith Amsenga	A doctor treating Gina Knight (Francesca Henry). She speaks to Gina's parents, George Knight (Colin Salmon) and Cindy Beale (Michelle Collins), about whether she may taken any drugs, which George confirms is a possibility. After deciding to keep Gina in hospital overnight for observations, Dr Harris informs Gina and George that blood tests found a high level of methamphetamine and warns Gina of the dangers of taking drugs and mixing them with alcohol.
Dr Moira Cage	6 September	Caroline Lawrie	A doctor who meets Sonia Fowler (Natalie Cassidy) and Reiss Colwell (Jonny Freeman) regarding their IVF treatment. When Reiss prepares for an injection, Dr Cage informs him that he will not be injected, but will actually need to ejaculate into a cup.
DS Tim Garrett	6 September − 2 October (2 episodes)	Andy Mace	A detective sergeant who questions Stacey Slater (Lacey Turner) after she reports Theo Hawthorne (William Ellis) for stalking her. Stacey shows him the messages that she received from Theo, and explains that Theo was an anonymous client when she worked as a webcam model and that she did not mislead him. DS Garrett reassures Stacey that he does not think that she was responsible for the stalking, but opined that she should have reported it sooner. He agrees to arrest Theo if he is at her house when he visits; he is at the house upon visiting. At the police station, DS Garrett questions Theo, who claims that he and Stacey were in a relationship but had an argument. He adds that Stacey threatened him with a carving knife, but that he doesn't want to press charges due to her bipolar disorder. DS Garrett asks for Theo's mobile phone, which he provides him. He later visits Stacey to inform her that the messages were sent to her from an unregistered mobile, so both Stacey and Theo's versions of events are unsupported, and they cannot arrest Theo. DS Garrett appears at Theo's court hearing to seek an interim Stalking Protection Order against Theo, on Stacey's behalf. As he takes the stand, Stacey enters the courtroom; they speak privately and Stacey shows him posters created by Theo, featuring a half-naked picture of her; Stacey is unable to prove Theo posted them. DS Garrett recommends that Stacey and her family do not stay for the hearing, but they stay. On the stand, he gives a testimony towards prosecuting Theo. Magistrate Collins (Jonathan Oliver) asks for physical evidence, but DS Garrett explains that his emotional evidence proves intent. He then presents evidence of 543 unwanted communications from Theo to Stacey. At the conclusion of the hearing, Magistrate Collins does not grant the Stalking Protection Order (SPO) against Theo.
DC Gilbert	18 September	Lucy Lowe	A detective constable who speaks to Suki Panesar (Balvinder Sopal) and Denise Fox (Diane Parish) about new information in relation to the murder of Ranveer Gulati (Anil Goutam). They claim that Ranveer's son, Ravi Gulati (Aaron Thiara), murdered him; Denise explains that she saw video footage of the murder that has since been destroyed. DC Gilbert recalls how Suki previously claimed to have killed Ranveer and produced a blank USB drive with supposed evidence of the murder, before telling them to go home.
PC Nash	26 September − 17 October (4 episodes)	Owen Guerin	A police constable who interviews Ravi Gulati (Aaron Thiara) following the disappearance of his teenage son, Davinder "Nugget" Gulati (Juhaim Rasul Choudhury). He questions why Ravi did not contact the police on the night of Nugget's disappearance and informs him that they will search Ravi's house and businesses and contact Nugget's friends and family. PC Nash asks about Nugget's mother, Priya Nandra-Hart (Sophie Khan Levy), but Ravi explains that she has not been part of his life since his birth. PC Nash then informs the family that the disappearance is being treated as an extremely high risk case. He later visits the family to ask for further information about why Nugget may have disappeared; Ravi admits there was an argument the day before his disappearance after he caught Nugget playing truant; PC Nash questions whether Nugget has ever hurt himself. Ravi gives PC Nash a recent photograph of Nugget. The following day, PC Nash visits Nugget's family to inform them they found CCTV footage of Nugget getting a bus. He confirms there is no evidence to suggest Nugget is at any harm. Privately, Ravi's stepmother, Suki Panesar (Balvinder Sopal), apologises for Ravi's anger; PC Nash begins to consider Ravi as a suspect. PC Nash then speaks to locals, including Martin Fowler (James Bye), about Nugget's disappearance. Weeks later, PC Nash informs Nugget's family that his phone has been found near the canal, so they are planning to dredge it. When Nugget is found, PC Nash interviews him; Nugget explains that he has been with his mother and that he left following an argument about school.
Dr Kemi Okoye	26 September	Esther Uwejeyah	A doctor who informs Sonia Fowler (Natalie Cassidy) and Reiss Colwell (Jonny Freeman), who are going through IVF treatment, that there is a decline in Reiss's sperm quality. She recommends trying an intracytoplasmic sperm injection (ICSI). Kemi also informs them that there has been a decline in Sonia's ovarian reserve and that they currently have a 19% chance of a live birth on the first cycle, but that this will increase with each cycle to approximately a 40% chance. She also reminds them about the financial implications of the treatment.
Jan Rockford	2–5 October (2 episodes)	Carrie Quinlan	A social worker assessing the suitability of Whitney Dean (Shona McGarty) and Zack Hudson (James Farrar as foster parents. They explain the reason they want to become foster parents. Jan asks about Whitney's childhood and the abuse she received from Tony King (Chris Coghill); Whitney speaks openly about this. When Whitney becomes upset, Jan offers to continue the conversation another day, but she declines. Jan praises Whitney for speaking about her abuse and states that it will help her to empathise with any foster children. Jan returns days later to inform Whitney and Zack that they have been approved to move to the next stage of fostering.
Magistrate Collins	2 October	Jonathan Oliver	The magistrate at Theo Hawthorne's (William Ellis) trial for stalking Stacey Slater (Lacey Turner). When DS Tim Garrett (Andy Mace) takes the stand with non-physical evidence for Theo, Magistrate Collins asks for physical evidence, which he provides. He also instructs Theo's defence solicitor, Mr Rath (Hywel Morgan), to not directly speak to Stacey as it is a civil hearing. At the conclusion of the hearing, Magistrate Collins does not grant the Stalking Protection Order (SPO) against Theo.
Mr Rath	2 October	Hywel Morgan	The defence solicitor at Theo Hawthorne's (William Ellis) trial for stalking Stacey Slater (Lacey Turner). He directly speaks to Stacey at the trial, so Magistrate Collins (Jonathan Oliver) warns him. Mr Rath refers to Stacey's work as a webcam model, her stints in prison and her teenage daughter's pregnancy in his defence of Theo. Mr Rath wins his case and the Stalking Protection Order (SPO) against Theo is not granted.
Victoria	3 October	Arybella Eddy	A couple having drinks in Peggy's wine bar. Victoria drunkenly staggers into Freddie Slater (Bobby Brazier), so he steadies her; she accuses him of groping her. Ross, her fiancé, then intervenes and prepares to fight Freddie. Anna Knight (Molly Rainford) intervenes and defends Freddie, so Ross informs Chelsea Fox (Zaraah Abrahams), who is working at Peggy's. Chelsea then asks Freddie to leave.
Ross	3 October	Stuart Vincent	A couple having drinks in Peggy's wine bar. Victoria drunkenly staggers into Freddie Slater (Bobby Brazier), so he steadies her; she accuses him of groping her. Ross, her fiancé, then intervenes and prepares to fight Freddie. Anna Knight (Molly Rainford) intervenes and defends Freddie, so Ross informs Chelsea Fox (Zaraah Abrahams), who is working at Peggy's. Chelsea then asks Freddie to leave.
PC Hawkins	4 October	Laya Lewis	A police officer who attends a callout to 31 Albert Square, where Theo Hawthorne (William Ellis) has been attacked after attempting to rape Stacey Slater (Lacey Turner). She takes Freddie Slater (Bobby Brazier), who attacked Theo, into another room and questions him about what happened. PC Hawkins then arrests Freddie for attempted murder.
PC Morris	4 October	Beth Johnston	A police officer who corners off 31 Albert Square after Theo Hawthorne (William Ellis) is attacked. She instructs Lily Slater (Lillia Turner) to stay back after she tries to enters the house. PC Morris then instructs Stacey Slater (Lacey Turner) and Freddie Slater (Bobby Brazier) to leave the house after being questioned. She informs Stacey that she will be taken for a forensic examination, so cannot have any contact with others until she has been examined.
DC Halliwell	5 October	Julie Stark	A detective constable who interviews Freddie Slater (Bobby Brazier) after he is arrested for the attempted murder of Theo Hawthorne (William Ellis). She asks him for his appropriate adult since he has attention deficit hyperactivity disorder (ADHD); he selects Jean Slater (Gillian Wright).
Claire Chappell	11 October − 20 November (2 episodes)	Alex Gray	The solicitor of Sharon Watts (Letitia Dean) who meets with Sharon and Keanu Taylor (Danny Walters) to present a shared parenting plan agreement for their son, Albie Watts (Arthur Gentleman). She explains to Keanu that they will not share equal custody of Albie and that Sharon will be able to make the final decision for anything concerning Albie, referring to his birth certificate where Keanu is not listed as the father. As she leaves the meeting, Claire tells Sharon that she understands her attraction to Keanu. Sharon meets Claire again after learning that Keanu is not Albie's biological father. She asks about the father's rights, but they are interrupted by Keanu's mother, Karen Taylor (Lorraine Stanley).
Jerome	26 October	Ntonga Mwanza	A receptionist at Walford General Hospital emergency department. Billy Mitchell (Perry Fenwick) and Honey Mitchell (Emma Barton) ask him whether Jay Brown (Jamie Borthwick) has been admitted, but Jerome will not confirm or deny without evidence that they are relatives of Jay, which they cannot provide. Billy insist that Jerome tell them where Jay is, so Jerome asks security to remove Billy from the department.
Sophie	1 November	Alexa Lee	The mother of Ted, a friend of Albie Watts (Arthur Gentleman), who is hosting a birthday party for her son. Sophie sees Albie with his father, Keanu Taylor (Danny Walters); Keanu lies that they are going to the dentist so cannot attend the party, but hands Sophie a gift for Ted.
DI Bolt	1–8 November (5 episodes)	Ian Drysdale	A detective inspector investigating the abduction of Albie Watts (Arthur Gentleman). He arrives after Albie's mother, Sharon Watts (Letitia Dean), reports that Albie's father, Keanu Taylor (Danny Walters), has abducted him; Keanu finds Sharon with DI Bolt and explains that Albie disappeared whilst he bought ice cream. DI Bolt explains that as he is the only significant witness, Keanu will need to complete a video interview at the police station. He reassures Sharon and Keanu that they have police officers looking for Albie. DI Bolt asks Sharon and Keanu if anyone would use Albie to harm them; Keanu suggests Dorian Gates (Luke J I Smith), who recently threatened Sharon and Albie. After inquiring, DI Bolt confirms that Dorian was not in the area. He later informs Sharon and Keanu that they have widened their search to Greater London and assigned four new officers to the case. He also suggests doing a media appeal for witnesses if he is not found by the following morning. The next day, DI Bolt informs Sharon that they are investigating some possible sightings. He encourages Sharon to do a media appeal, but she is not keen. Later that day, Albie is returned home by his grandmother, Karen Taylor (Lorraine Stanley), who collected Albie after the family agreed to pay a ransom. DI Bolt questions Karen and asks Sharon to bring Albie to the station for questioning from a child specialist too, but she refuses. The following day, DI Bolt updates Sharon and Keanu on the case, and criticises them for not sharing the ransom information with the police.
DS Gaunt	2 November	Jessica Fostekew	A detective sergeant who searches Karen Taylor's (Lorraine Stanley) house following the abduction of her grandson, Albie Watts (Arthur Gentleman).
PC Tyler	2 November	Richie Bratby	A police officer questioning Jay Brown (Jamie Borthwick) about a car accident he was involved in. He asks for Jay's permission to view the blood sample taken upon his hospital admission, but Jay refuses consent.
Malcolm	7–28 November (3 episodes)	Greg Haiste	The husband of Kandice Taylor (Hannah Spearritt) who agrees to look after Albie Watts (Arthur Gentleman), the grandson of Kandice's sister Karen Taylor (Lorraine Stanley). Malcolm meets Karen in the local playground to return Albie and is annoyed when Karen does not thank him. Malcolm later attends Karen's birthday party to the surprise of Karen and Albie's father, Keanu Taylor (Danny Walters). He gives Karen a vibrating belly belt as a present. Malcolm sees Albie again; his mother, Sharon Watts (Letitia Dean) remarks that he is normally shy around strangers, which confuses Malcolm. Sharon explains that Albie was recently kidnapped for nearly 24 hours and mentions that it happened around Bonfire Night; Malcolm realises that he was caring for Albie during that time and that Karen and Keanu had orchestrated the kidnapping to blackmail Sharon for money. Keanu tries to justify his actions, but threatens to tell the police that Malcolm was involved from the beginning if he reports them, so Malcolm leaves.
Nurse Joy Crane	9 November	Jacqueline Jordan	A nurse who informs Kathy Cotton (Gillian Taylforth) that her husband, Tom "Rocky" Cotton (Brian Conley), is awake after being injured in a fire.
Dr Leeland	13 November	Jessica Brindle	A doctor who informs Alfie Moon (Shane Richie) that his prostate surgery did not remove all of his cancer. She recommends hormone therapy and a course of radiotherapy and predicts that this will take Alfie into remission.
Danny White	13 November	Jake Ferretti	A fire investigator who investigates the fire at Bridge Street Café. Nish Panesar (Navin Chowdhry) questions Danny about the fire, but he refuses to comment. Cindy Beale (Michelle Collins) then tells Danny that she has information about the cause of the fire.
DC Makin	13 November	Nadi Kemp-Sayfi	A detective constable who arrests Kathy Cotton (Gillian Taylforth) for criminal damage by fire where life was endangered, following a fire at her café.
DI Xiang	14 November 2023 − 21 August 2024 (6 episodes)	Arthur Lee	A detective inspector who questions Kathy Cotton (Gillian Taylforth) about the fire at her café. He encourages Kathy to take legal representation, but she declines. DI Xiang asks Kathy about her financial state and the café's faulty electrics. DI Xiang investigates the disappearance of Eve Unwin (Heather Peace) and asks her former employer, Nish Panesar (Navin Chowdhry), and his son, Ravi Gulati (Aaron Thiara), about what he knows following an anonymous tip-off. He later returns with a search warrant for Ravi's car and finds evidence. Nish and Ravi are arrested for the suspected murder of Eve and DI Xiang interviews them individually at the police station. He presents Nish with evidence linking him to the crime and tells Ravi that Nish is implicating him. When Eve is found alive, DI Xiang informs Nish and Ravi that they are being released. The following year, DI Xiang questions Kathy about Reiss Colwell (Jonny Freeman). He then arrests Reiss and his fiancée, Sonia Fowler (Natalie Cassidy), for the murder of Reiss' wife, Debbie Colwell (Jenny Meier). DI Xiang interviews Sonia at the police station and informs her that Debbie was smothered to death with a pillow, which had Sonia's DNA on it. He questions her about the reasons for her visit to Debbie's carehome, her relationship with Debbie, her life insurance and a planned visit to Yorkshire. DI Xiang reveals that nobody can account for Sonia's whereabouts on the night of Debbie's death, so she will be charged with her murder.
Dr Sekibo	15–16 November (2 episodes)	Stefan Adegbola	A doctor who informs Sharon Watts (Letitia Dean) that her son, Albie Watts (Arthur Gentleman), has the genetic condition Alpha-1 antitrypsin deficiency (AADT). He reassures Sharon that it is not life-threatening, but explains that both parents must have the AADT gene for Albie to inherit it; Sharon agrees to her and Albie's father, Keanu Taylor (Danny Walters), being tested for it. Dr Sekibo then informs Sharon and Keanu that only Sharon is a carrier of the gene and privately confirms to Sharon that Keanu is not the father of Albie. Sharon is shocked by the news, but Dr Sekibo confirms that this is correct.
Tessa	15–23 November (4 episodes)	Georgia Frost	A woman who asks Eve Unwin (Heather Peace) on a date. Eve declines, so Tessa gives her her number; they arrange a date at Walford East restaurant for later that day. On the date, Eve is distracted by her former girlfriend, Suki Panesar (Balvinder Sopal), which Tessa notices. Eve suggests moving to a different place, which Tessa agrees with. Eve later takes Tessa on another date to The Queen Victoria pub. In need of change for the jukebox, Tessa visits the Minute Mart corner shop, where Suki works, but is turned away. The pair arrange another date to play Laser Quest. Eve then introduces Tessa to her friends, Kat Mitchell (Jessie Wallace) and Alfie Moon (Shane Richie), and Tessa remarks that they make a good couple. Eve later ends the relationship as she still has feelings for Suki. Tessa is understanding and they say goodbye.
Camillo	22 November	Marco Zingaro	A drug dealer who Sam Mitchell (Kim Medcalf) owes £100,000 to. Sam and Camillo meet and he asks for his money; she does not have the money, so he threatens to hurt her and drags her into a car. Sam's sister-in-law, Kat Mitchell (Jessie Wallace), witnesses this and gets Sam's brother, Phil Mitchell (Steve McFadden), to warn Camillo off. Phil agrees to give Camillo the money, so he leaves.
PC McAllister	14 December	Roger Ajogbe	Two police constables investigating the disappearance of Eve Unwin (Heather Peace). PC Duffy tells Stacey Slater (Lacey Turner) to let the police continue with their enquires when she suggests that her stalker, Theo Hawthorne (William Ellis), is responsible. They later speak to Ravi Gulati (Aaron Thiara) about Eve's disappearance; he claims to have last seen her two weeks earlier at her work.
PC Duffy	14 December	Kirsty Oswald	Two police constables investigating the disappearance of Eve Unwin (Heather Peace). PC Duffy tells Stacey Slater (Lacey Turner) to let the police continue with their enquires when she suggests that her stalker, Theo Hawthorne (William Ellis), is responsible. They later speak to Ravi Gulati (Aaron Thiara) about Eve's disappearance; he claims to have last seen her two weeks earlier at her work.
Yasmin	22 December − 2 January 2024 (2 episodes)	Courtney Bowman	A social worker allocated to Ashton (Jensen Clayden) who introduces him to his temporary foster carers, Zack Hudson (James Farrar) and Whitney Dean (Shona McGarty). Over a week later, she collects Ashton from Zack and Whitney to take him to his next foster placement.
PC Paxton	26 December	Jonathan Ball	A police officer who responds to an emergency call from The Queen Victoria pub made by landlady Linda Carter (Kellie Bright). When he visits the pub, Denise Fox (Diane Parish) answers and claims to be Linda; she lies that it must have been one of her children making the call, so he leaves.
DC Barton	27 December	Danielle Walters	A detective constable who interviews Suki Panesar (Balvinder Sopal) about the attack on her husband, Nish Panesar (Navin Chowdhry). Suki explains that she told Nish that she was leaving him and that he had argued with Keanu Taylor (Danny Walters). She adds that Keanu attacked Nish with a champagne bottle and left him to die. DC Barton asks Suki about her affair with Eve Unwin (Heather Peace), but Suki says it is not relevant.
Dr McIntyre	27 December	Amelia Curtis	A doctor who treats Nish Panesar (Navin Chowdhry) after he is attacked. She informs his family that he is in an induced coma to help the swelling on his brain.
