= Sam Mitchell (EastEnders) =

- EastEnders character
- Kim Medcalf as Sam Mitchell (2025)
- Portrayed by: Danniella Westbrook (1990–2000, 2009–2016); Kim Medcalf (2002–2005, 2022–2026); Laila Murphy (2022, 2025 flashbacks)
- Duration: 1990–1993; 1995–1996; 1999–2000; 2002–2005; 2009–2010; 2016; 2022–2026
- First appearance: Episode 569; 19 July 1990
- Last appearance: Episode 7336; 26 May 2026
- Introduced by: Michael Ferguson (1990); Corinne Hollingworth (1995); Matthew Robinson (1999); John Yorke (2002); Diederick Santer (2009); Bryan Kirkwood (2010); Dominic Treadwell-Collins (2016); Kate Oates (2022); Ben Wadey (2025)
- Spin-off appearances: Comic Relief 2003: The Big Hair Do (2003); EastEnders: E20 (2010); Marsden's Video Diaries (2010)
In-universe information
- Other names: Sam Butcher; Sam Hunter
- Occupation: Barmaid; Lap-dancer; Businesswoman; Bar manager; Career criminal
- Family: Mitchell
- Father: Eric Mitchell
- Mother: Peggy Mitchell
- Stepfather: Frank Butcher; Archie Mitchell
- Brothers: Phil Mitchell; Grant Mitchell
- Husband: Ricky Butcher (1991–1996); Andy Hunter (2004–2005)
- Sons: Ricky Branning
- Granddaughters: Charli Slater
- Uncles: Archie Mitchell; Clive Mitchell
- Aunts: Aunt Sal
- Nephews: Ben Mitchell; Mark Fowler; Dennis Rickman Jnr (adoptive); Raymond Fox; Albie Watts
- Nieces: Courtney Mitchell; Louise Mitchell
- First cousins: Ronnie Mitchell; Roxy Mitchell; Lenny Martin; Loretta Martin
- Other relatives: Billy Mitchell

Sam Mitchell (also Butcher and Hunter) is a fictional character from the BBC soap opera EastEnders. The third member of the Mitchell family to appear on the soap, Sam was introduced as a 15-year-old schoolgirl in July 1990, originally played by Danniella Westbrook. Westbrook left in 1993, but Sam reappeared from 1995 to 1996 and from 1999 to 2000. In both stints, Sam was written out earlier than the producers intended due to off-screen controversies surrounding Westbrook. In January 2002, Sam was introduced for the fourth time, but the role was recast for Kim Medcalf, who stayed in it until November 2005. Diederick Santer later decided to reintroduce Sam for a brief stint in 2009 and opted to bring Westbrook back. Westbrook briefly reprised the role once again in 2016 for the funeral of Sam's mother Peggy Mitchell (Barbara Windsor). In January 2022, it was announced that Sam would be reintroduced, this time once again featuring Medcalf in the role. She has continued to portray the character through several storyline arcs, with the most recent one concluding in May 2026.

At first Sam was initially portrayed as a young naïve girl who had often been relied upon less by her mother Peggy in contrast to Sam's two older brothers Phil (Steve McFadden) and Grant (Ross Kemp) on frequent occasions. However, as time went on, Sam gradually evolved into becoming a more charismatic and headstrong woman with a penchant for dating the wrong men and a determination to be taken more seriously.

Her storylines involved an elopement with established character Ricky Butcher (Sid Owen); a competitive love triangle with Ricky and his second wife Bianca Jackson (Patsy Palmer); an on-off quarrel with sister-in-law Sharon Watts (Letitia Dean); having sex with various antagonists such as Phil's archenemy Steve Owen (Martin Kemp) and wife-beater Trevor Morgan (Alex Ferns); feuding with the rival Watts family that involves Sam sleeping with Sharon's half-brother Dennis Rickman (Nigel Harman) and later getting conned by their illegitimate father Den Watts (Leslie Grantham); getting seduced in a relationship with crime boss Andy Hunter (Michael Higgs) and later marrying him; being betrayed by family lawyer Marcus Christie (Stephen Churchett) when he collaborates with Den's plan to bankrupt the Mitchell Empire; a platonic friendship with Phil's friend Minty Peterson (Cliff Parisi); a lengthy feud with Den's widow Chrissie (Tracy-Ann Oberman) that culminates in the latter framing Sam for Den's murder; an affair with local club owner Jack Branning (Scott Maslen) that leads to the birth of their son Ricky Branning (Henri Charles/Frankie Day); becoming a suspect in the murder of her uncle Archie (Larry Lamb); feuds with Kat Slater (Jessie Wallace) and Denise Fox (Diane Parish); scheming with Phil's rival Jonah Tyler (Mark Mooney) in taking over the family assets; discovering that her son Ricky is becoming a father at twelve years old; publicly revealing Phil’s one-night stand with Emma Harding (Patsy Kensit), which leads to her departure from the show. Upon her return in 2025, Sam is featured in a storyline in which she receives a breast cancer diagnosis.

== Creation and development ==
=== Casting ===
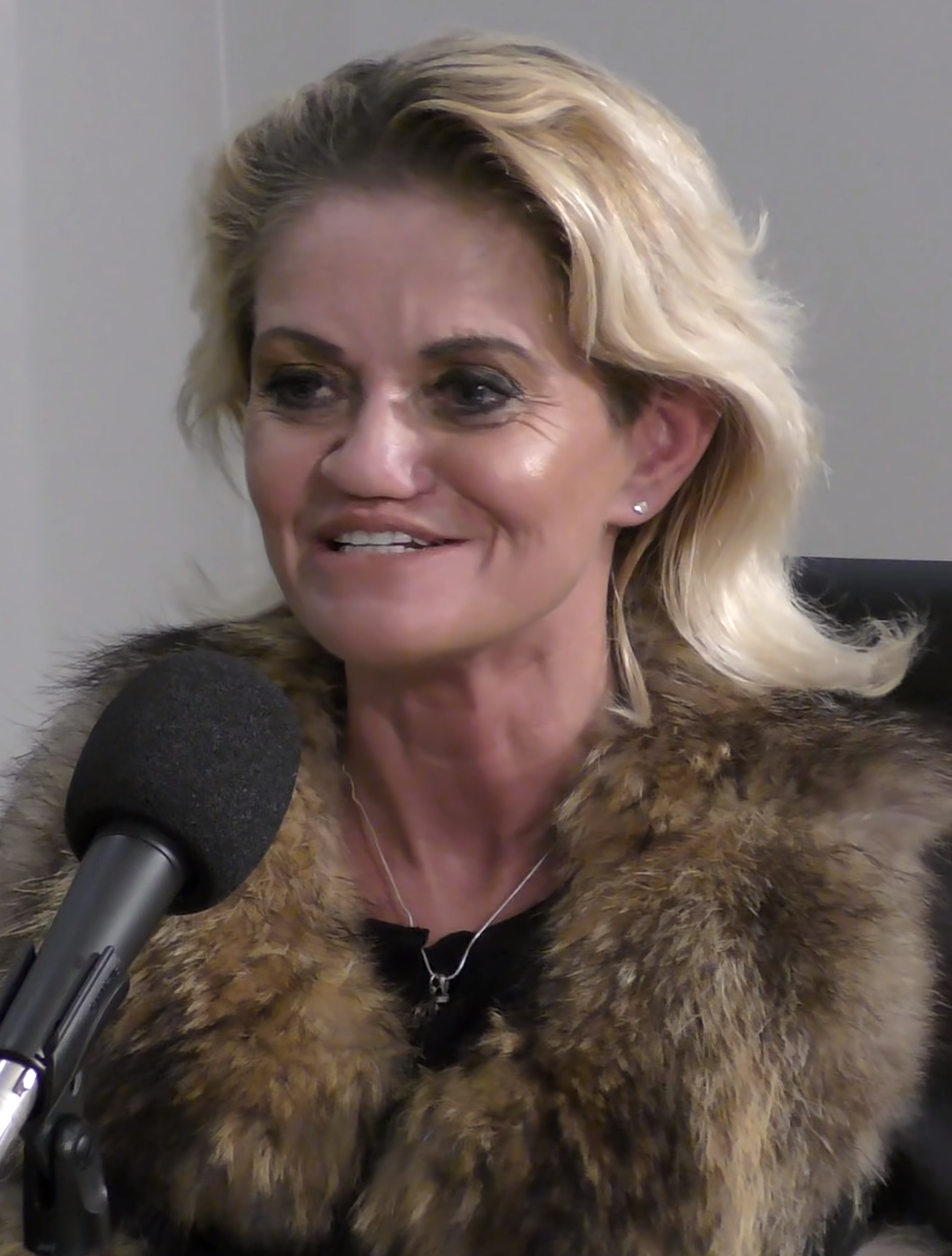
Danniella Westbrook (pictured) was the first actress to portray Sam.

The character Sam Mitchell was introduced in July 1990 by EastEnders' executive producer Michael Ferguson as the young sister of the Mitchell brothers, Phil (Steve McFadden) and Grant (Ross Kemp). Sam was one of several characters introduced by the producer in the summer of 1990. Others included Eddie Royle (Michael Melia), and three generations of the Tavernier family.

As the casting team had successfully cast the actors who were playing Sam's brothers, they already knew what facial attributes they needed for Sam to create a similar family resemblance. Producer Corinne Hollingworth has commented, "we'd decided on Steve [McFadden] and Ross [Kemp] and we knew the sort of round, open face we needed. We saw Danniella (Westbrook) first and liked her, then saw some others, but came back to her." The actress, a graduate of the Sylvia Young Theatre School, had already appeared in the soap aged 11, as an extra who rollerskated across the soap's fictional setting of Albert Square in front of the characters Den and Angie Watts. At the time, Westbrook's local paper ran a story on her with the punchline, "who knows, one day she might be the show's star". Eighty girls auditioned for the part of Sam, but these eighty were eventually whittled down to four. On her final casting callback, Westbrook bumped into actors Michelle Gayle and Sid Owen, who were already on the EastEnders cast as Hattie Tavernier and Ricky Butcher respectively. Westbrook already knew Gayle, whose character was to be Sam's screen best friend, and she introduced her to Owen, whose character was scripted to be Sam's boyfriend. According to Westbrook, she liked Owen right from the start and was amused by his response of "You're a bit of alright. You can be Sam!". On Westbrook's last audition, she and the other hopefuls were forced to stand for a lengthy period in front of a panel of the show's producers, directors, and writers while they continuously compared images of the auditionees to images of Kemp and McFadden, looking for a resemblance. Westbrook was given the part. She has commented, "they told me they were looking for someone bright and bubbly, who could be the sister of Phil and Grant, and my round face fitted." In the character's first scene, Sam walked past Ricky Butcher and gave him a "flirty backward glance", causing him to walk into a lamp-post. Westbrook was initially given a three-month contract with the soap, but halfway through her contract the producers extended it as they felt "the character of Sam had gelled well with the others and they wanted to include her in more storylines".

Westbrook has said that the cast and crew became like a second family to her, with the roles in the soap mirroring their relationships off-screen. In her autobiography she comments, "Sid [Owen] and I became very close [...] we were as thick as thieves. When we weren't shooting together we'd hang out [...] Once Sid and I got so bored hanging around on set that we decided to take the milk float for a spin around Albert Square, but Sid drove it too fast and turned it over [...] we couldn't stop laughing, but the producers didn't seem to share our amusement. We were seriously told off that day." She has described other actors such as Michelle Gayle, Letitia Dean, Adam Woodyatt and Nick Berry as brothers and sisters, and has said she was very close to older cast members such as June Brown, Wendy Richard, Mike Reid and Gillian Taylforth. She has also revealed that her off-screen relationship with actors McFadden and Kemp mirrored her character's on-screen one: "In the soap they were my older brothers, always looking out for me, making sure I didn't get into trouble, and off set they were exactly the same."

=== Personality and characterisation ===
The character has been described by Hilary Kingsley, author the EastEnders Handbook, as a "tease [...] a pretty girl who thinks she can get anything she wants, thanks to her own brand of sexy wheedling." She adds that Sam is "a lot sharper than her brothers [...] and contrives to do just what she wants in the face of their attempts to stand in for their dead father [...] Sam loves excitement and doesn't frighten easily. She's a user, able to get almost anyone to do what she wants." Kate Lock, author of EastEnders Who's Who, has described Sam as "Headstrong, streetwise and pretty [...] a chip off the old Mitchell block, though her methods of manipulation are marginally more subtle than [her brothers]. One bat of a sooty eyelash is enough to charm most men into submission and she can wind doting mum Peggy round her little finger [...] [when] she returned to the Square [in 1999], Sam had lost her kittenish cuteness and hardened up, becoming more EastEnd moll than Barbie doll."

Describing the character in 2002, actress Kim Medcalf said, "She wears her heart on her sleeve. She so wants to settle down that she doesn't select men well. She goes for people too quickly. She likes the danger aspect – the thrill of the chase. She loves guys with a dangerous edge [...] She's had a tough upbringing. She didn't know her dad and her older brothers bossed her around. She needed to find herself and has done it by being independent and going away. She's headstrong and has a definite independent streak." She has added that Sam has a problem with women, as she "finds it quite hard to relate".

When Westbrook regained the role in 2009, she compared the differences between how she and Medcalf played the character: "When Kim was playing Sam she was quite hard, but [the Sam who returns in 2009] is more the Sam I've always played. She's bright, colourful, flirtatious – and trouble. The only difference is she's more tanned, more blonde and more wrinkled!"

When Medcalf returned to the role in 2022, she was asked if Sam had changed since she last played her. Medcalf responded: "She is a little bit harder, she has had to really toughen up and grow up. She's lost her mum which has devastated her and I think she's really feeling that she has to up her game." In an interview in 2023, Medcalf expressed her "enjoyment" of playing the role: "Sam is a joy to play — although she does say things that you read on paper and you think, "Oh my god, really? You are really going to say that, Sam?" But the reason I love this character so deeply is that I don't think she's a nasty person. She doesn't think about things, and she's got very little filter. She will defend herself, and if someone goes for her or her family, she'll go for them. She's strong like that. She's made some really stupid decisions, but I believe she's a good person and capable of being really empathetic."

In an interview in 2025, Westbrook reflected on the differences between her portrayal and Medcalf's portrayal of Sam: "The way I play Sam and the way she [Medcalf] plays Sam, it’s like two completely different characters. Even the writing changes. What they write for her and what they write for me are like two different personalities. Kim plays her a lot posher, not as East End, not as flirty, she's more middle-class in her version".

=== Westbrook's initial stint (1990–2000) ===
==== Teen elopement ====
During her first stint in the soap, the character was involved in various high-profile storylines surrounding her teen elopement to Ricky Butcher (Sid Owen). Westbrook has said that within days of her first appearance, the interest in the character was "phenomenal": "The public couldn't get enough of the simmering relationship between Ricky and Sam and the show was inundated with calls from the press [...] [Sam and Ricky] were involved in a plotline about under-age sex, so the press swooped in on that."

To the anger of her family, Sam persuaded Ricky to elope to Gretna Green in July 1991. The week's worth of episodes focusing on their marriage were filmed onlocation and have been described by former EastEnders scriptwriter Colin Brake as a "farce-like chase round the country". Written by Debbie Cook, the storyline saw Ricky and Sam's families, including Sam's mother, Peggy (Jo Warne; introduced specifically for this plotline), attempting to stop the couple from getting married. The storyline climaxed in a registry office wedding, but despite the Scottish setting, the recording of the episodes took place in Hertfordshire. Later in the month, Sam and Ricky had a more official "grand church blessing" with their families in attendance. The Butchers' blessing was screened in the same episode as the funeral of another character, Charlie Cotton.

The marriage was portrayed as problematic, fraught with interference from their families, lack of money, and Ricky's jealousy of Sam's partying and modelling career, including a topless photo shoot. The serial made use of Sam's appearance in various storylines, including a "Miss Queen Vic" public house competition in an episode that aired in April 1992 – despite the Mitchell brothers attempts' to fix the competition, the honest winner was Sam. Written by Tony Jordan, Colin Brake describes it as one of 1992's most memorable episodes. However, off-screen Westbrook was battling with various problems in her personal life (including a highly publicised drug addiction), and in 1993 she left the soap, although she maintains that her addiction did not affect her work at this time.

On-screen, Sam's marriage to Ricky ended following an affair with a yuppie named Clive (Sean Gallagher), and she took a job on a cruise ship. Commenting on her initial departure, Westbrook has said, "My contract was up for renewal and I thought it was time for me to move on [...] As much as I enjoyed being in EastEnders [...] I was also well aware of the fact that I was in danger of being type-cast forever if I carried on playing Sam. The producers didn't have a problem with me leaving. It was felt that my character had done as much as she could in the space of three years, anyway. During that time Sam had, after all, been involved in a story about under-age sex, run off to Gretna Green to marry Ricky, been evicted from her home, become a squatter, tried her luck as a topless model, fought on a regular basis with Grant and Phil, and gone through a marriage break-up. I think we all agreed that the poor girl was in need of a break [...] In January 1993 I filmed my final scenes and Sam Mitchell, in true EastEnders style, waved goodbye to Albert Square from the back of a London taxi cab [...] Although the producers agreed that it was the right time for my character to move on, they wanted to keep the door open for her to return at a later date, as they knew how popular the Mitchell family were with viewers. I was really pleased that they decided not to kill the character off". Her departure scenes aired on 4 February 1993.

==== Reintroduction and axing (1995–1996) ====
In 1995, following a spell in a drug rehab clinic, which first alerted the public to her drug problem, Westbrook was reintroduced into EastEnders by executive producer Corinne Hollingworth. She has commented, "the call from the producers couldn't have come at a more opportune moment for me. The soap was suffering from poor ratings and so they decided, as they normally do, to bring some familiar faces back onto the Square. The producers were aware of my addiction by now [...] but they had also read that I was now clean [...] once I assured them that I was well [...] they invited me back for another year." The character's "dramatic" return to EastEnders aired on 25 July 1995 and began when her screen brothers traced Sam to Spain and she ended up in bed with "bad boy" David Wicks (Michael French). Several cast changes had occurred since Westbrook had last been in the soap, including a recast of her screen mother Peggy, who was now played by Barbara Windsor. As well as her former friends, Westbrook has revealed that she became particularly close to Windsor, who she says "instantly took me under her wing", and Martine McCutcheon, who played Tiffany Raymond.

Though Westbrook initially enjoyed her time back at the soap, she was unable to keep her working life and private life separate. Off-screen, her partying and drug-use (both in and out of work) began to affect her performance. Her cast mates attempted to curtail the problem. Actors such as Wendy Richard and Mike Reid requested that Westbrook's dressing room be situated near theirs and away from the younger cast, because they could see she was "vulnerable". They attempted to talk to her about her drug problem, but Westbrook ignored their concerns and continued using. She has revealed that she became so affected by cocaine that she would continuously mess up her lines, had to do take after take, was constantly late and needed prompts, and spontaneously fell asleep, once even passing out while she stood at the top of the Queen Vic stairs during filming, and was only saved from harming herself by Ross Kemp who caught her in his arms. She has commented, "When I watch re-runs of those scenes now I can't believe how out of it I look." Many of the newer, younger cast members began to shun her, laughing at her and throwing peanuts at her during filming every time she attempted to deliver her lines. Eventually, the producers tired of Westbrook. She has revealed: "the producers now had serious doubts about my future on the soap. I was proving to be a liability. My behaviour was interfering with the schedule. It was interfering with other cast members' work. There were days when I just didn't bother showing up for work at all. The dilemma they faced was what to do with me. They had only just written [Sam] back into the soap; now, within months, they were having to write her out of it all over again. They felt bad about getting rid of me, too. I could tell they felt responsible for me but of course ultimately there wasn't much they could do to help [...] Within a couple of weeks I was called into a meeting and told very politely that they were going to let me go early and terminate my contract. They would, they explained, gradually write my character out of the scripts again, which would take a couple of months to do."

In February 1996, Westbrook's axing was reported in the press. According to press reports, producers had tired of her off-screen antics and were angered that she had appeared on the Channel 4 chat show, The Girlie Show, and had given away the outcome of a storyline she was involved with, a love-triangle between Sam, Ricky and his new girlfriend Bianca Jackson (Patsy Palmer). The character departed for Spain on 26 March 1996 after falling for a Spanish tourist. Westbrook has since commented, "The producers were very nice about it all. Rather than killing [Sam] off they sent her to Spain, once again leaving the door open for her to return [...] There was no official line as to why I was leaving, and when the announcement was made [...] they were kind enough to let me say in interviews that I was going because I wanted 'a change of direction'. 'Hopefully, one day I'll return to the show', I told journalists".

==== Second reintroduction and axing (1999–2000) ====
In November 1998, Westbrook revealed to Hello! magazine that she was "desperate" to return to EastEnders, because she was in need of the money. According to Westbrook, actors Mike Reid and Barbara Windsor who both appeared as Frank and Peggy Butcher were keen to have her back on the cast too. Her plea came at a time when executive producer Matthew Robinson had already considered bringing Sam back, but because of Westbrook's past problems, he wanted to recast the role to another actress. However, the BBC's Controller of Continuing Drama Series, Mal Young, thought they were judging Westbrook unfairly, believing a lot of the stories printed about her in the tabloid press. On his say so, Westbrook was offered another contract to reprise the role of Sam. In May 1999, Westbrook said, "It's my dream come true. Sam is a great character and I'm thrilled to be given another chance to play her. The storyline is excellent and I think it's safe to say there'll be a few family fireworks once I'm back in town." Executive producer Matthew Robinson said, "We are delighted to be welcoming back the popular character of Sam Butcher to the Square for storylines that are certain to intrigue our viewers."

The character made her return on-screen on 22 July 1999 and was involved in the storyline relating to actor Ross Kemp's departure, and romances with her brothers' enemies Beppe di Marco (Michael Greco) and Steve Owen (Martin Kemp). Despite Westbrook's claims that her close friend Mike Reid had backed her decision to return, he and other EastEnders actors later publicly denounced the BBC's decision in a documentary about Westbrook, as they had first hand experience of Westbrook's addiction on set and were concerned for her welfare. It was reported that Westbrook underwent constant drug tests to keep her job, but at this time, her excessive use of cocaine had completely eroded away her nasal septum. In order to hide this from the audience, she was only filmed in ways that would keep her septum hidden from view. However, Westbrook's drug use continued, and following more press speculation about her private life, the BBC announced in January 2000 that she was being axed from the soap once again. A BBC spokesman said: "Danniella Westbrook's contract has not been renewed. Her character Sam Mitchell will move to north London, leaving the door open for her to return in the future." Westbrook added: "I will always love working on EastEnders, especially with the cast. Sam's departure to north London gives me the chance to explore more opportunities." Speaking to London's radio station Capital 95.8, Westbrook denied she had been sacked, saying she decided to leave because she was getting married and she wanted to spend time with her husband. She added, "I'll maybe go back to EastEnders in six months, so it's an amicable split."

Westbrook did not return and made her final appearance as Sam on 24 January 2000. She has since confessed that her drug taking was the reason why she was written out. In her autobiography she comments, "I wasn't fired this time, but let's just say when they gave me the opportunity to walk I took it. I was no longer interested in acting and that had become blatantly obvious to everyone on set. The soap was now being shown four times a week and it was impossible to balance the workload with my addiction [...] Not only had [cocaine] destroyed my nose, but it was about to destroy my career again as well [...] The producers were tiring of my behaviour [...] When I did leave the production at the end of 1999 it was in fact a fairly mutual decision. I admit that had I begged the producers to let me stay this time I doubt if they would have allowed me to. But I was happy to go [...] Looking back to that point now it fills me with shame that I could have behaved in that way and let down so many people". Following her axing, Westbrook's eroded nasal septum was revealed to the public by the press, after she was photographed at the 2000 British Soap Awards.

=== Medcalf's initial stint (2002–2005) ===
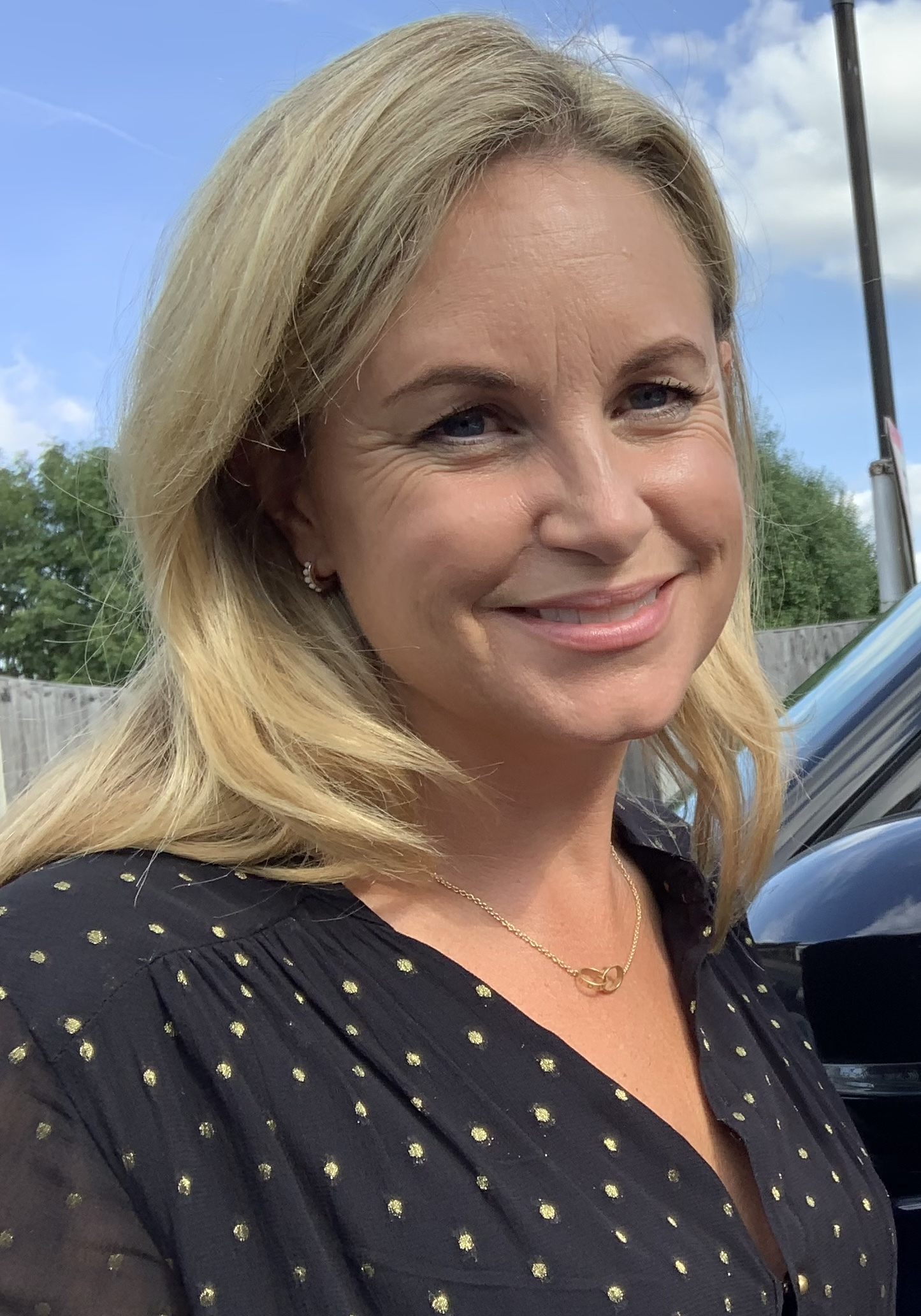
Kim Medcalf (pictured) took over from Westbrook in 2002.

In 2001, executive producer John Yorke decided to reintroduce the character once again. The decision was made to recast the role to another actress, Kim Medcalf, as Danniella Westbrook was still overcoming her drug problems at this time. During the audition process, EastEnders have said that they had to keep the part they were casting for "top secret", meaning auditionees were not told about the part they were auditioning for until their actual interview. In the documentary, EastEnders Revealed – A Year in the Life of Sam Mitchell, Medcalf has explained the audition process: "They kind of sat me down and said 'actually we haven't been 100% truthful here, this [audition] is not for...a new character at all, it's for the part of Sam Mitchell. Do you know who she is?' and I said, 'yes of course I do!' [...] Because my attitude was so laid back, it helped me a lot." Producer Paul Annett has revealed: "I saw Kim Medcalf along with two other actresses that had been short-listed, and I think almost immediately I knew that she was the right one." Medcalf was an inexperienced actress, and her casting has been described as a "big risk" because of this. Annett has commented, "she'd done...no television, secondly, she was coming into an immensely popular and beloved show, and the third thing was that she was taking over a role played by Danniella Westbrook...for [a decade]." Medcalf revealed that she had reservations about taking on a role that was associated with another actress: "I said 'that's going to be hard' [...] but they said 'we think we can do it, we're going to write it in quite cleverly, and part of it will be that we meet Sam away from Walford'." She added, "It was scary finding out I'd be taking over someone else's character because you wonder whether the public will accept it. I loved the show so I just decided to go for it". Commenting on Medcalf's casting, Sam's original actress Danniella Westbrook said, "I wish her all the luck in the world. It's a great part and I'm sure she'll be great." In an interview in 2021, Westbrook revealed that she met Medcalf at an award ceremony in 2009 and thanked her for "keeping Sam alive".

Medcalf has revealed to the Walford Gazette how she prepared for the role: "I actually watched the show a bit when Danniella had been on so I had a distinct memory of her to work with. What I basically did was to read a prepared, detailed biography of the character which was provided by the production office. I did sit down to watch a five-minute clip of Danniella but I quickly realised I didn't want to carry on watching because I was afraid of falling into doing an imitation of her, d'ye know what I mean? I'll tell you something weird-when I first started getting the scripts I used to hear the lines first in my head with HER voice saying them! But that changed over time, thank God, as I hopefully made the character my own and I gave her my voice." Medcalf added that contrastingly to Westbrook, who played Sam as a young girl who was overprotected by her brothers and sheltered, she played Sam as a young woman "trying to find her place both in a career and in relationships with the opposite sex."

The character was reintroduced in January 2002 in a set of episodes filmed on-location in Spain. In the storyline, Sam's mother Peggy (Barbara Windsor) had flown to Spain for the supposed funeral of her former husband and Sam's former father-in-law, Frank Butcher. Here she found Sam, who was working as a table dancer in a nightclub; Peggy brought Sam back to Walford. Annett has praised Medcalf's introduction, saying she was confident and that Barbara Windsor found her impressive. Medcalf's first scenes aired on 29 January 2002.

==== Men and business ====
Sam's return to Walford saw her reignite an affair with her former, now married lover Steve Owen (Martin Kemp), who was embroiled in a feud with her brother Phil. Medcalf has revealed that she was extremely nervous when she was informed that she would have to enact love scenes with Kemp, who aside from his part in EastEnders, was renowned to viewers as a member of the 1980s pop band Spandau Ballet. Speaking about the characters' affair, Medcalf has said, "Steve Owen basically made a play for her because he was using her to get back at Phil. He knew that Phil would hate it [as] they were rivals. But then, in her defence, he was a charmer, and he managed to keep it all from his wife. He just played the game very well." The relationship ended in "tragedy" when Steve, in an attempt to kidnap Phil's daughter Louise, was killed in a road accident. Medcalf has suggested that Sam was "devastated" by Steve's death: "She fell for [his game] hook, line and sinker. She really believed that he was going to be the man." She subsequently moved on to her former lover Beppe di Marco, but according to Medcalf, that relationship finished because Beppe "thought [Sam] was a bit full on [...] she was so desperate for a relationship that I think it just scared [Beppe]." Another fling followed with abusive Trevor Morgan, played by Alex Ferns. According to Ferns, the relationship started because Trevor wanted to make his wife, Little Mo (Kacey Ainsworth) jealous. In the storyline, the romance ended when Trevor's true aggressive self emerged.

In 2004, the character was romantically paired with gangster Andy Hunter, played by Michael Higgs. In the storyline, Sam had been left in charge of the various Mitchell business and properties, and Andy, sensing an opportunity to gain control of these assets, proposed to Sam. According to Medcalf, Sam needed the marriage because she was "vulnerable". She added, "Andy is tough and she craves someone to look after her. I can see why she'd go for him; he's a good-looking guy, he's got money, he wears good clothes – he ticks every box." 11 million viewers watched Sam marry Andy in September 2004. According to Medcalf, "She knows that he's not desperately in love with her, but she thinks that it's enough. She's desperately in love with him. She's entering it very positively [...] Sam's not the brightest person, so she falls for his manipulations [...] I think she just wants to get the ring on her finger and then they can try to iron out any problems. She's a little naive." The marriage lasted mere months on-screen; when Sam was conned into giving away all her family's properties, including her mother's public house (pub), The Queen Vic, Andy threw her out of their house.

==== Murder of Den Watts and departure ====
Sam's reaction to the loss of her mother's pub was part of a high-profile storyline marking the 20th anniversary of EastEnders, the murder of Den Watts. In the storyline, Den Watts had been responsible for Sam losing the pub, and so Sam teamed up with Den's scorned wife, Chrissie Watts, and Zoe Slater, who had also been scorned by Den. The trio, who were dubbed the three witches of Walford – a comparison to the Three Witches from the Shakespeare play Macbeth – plotted Den's downfall, resulting in a deadly confrontation in the Vic, and Den being bludgeoned to death by Chrissie. The three women buried Den's body in the Vic cellar and Sam proceeded to blackmail Chrissie and was then framed for Den's murder by Chrissie. The culmination of the plot – which saw Ross Kemp and Steve McFadden return to EastEnders as Phil and Grant to exonerate Sam – signified the departure of Kim Medcalf, who opted to leave the serial in 2005. Medcalf's final scenes aired on 17 November 2005.

=== Westbrook's return (2009–2010) ===
Westbrook returned to the show in 2009 in part of a shock storyline. Speaking of her comeback, she said, "I'm really happy to be coming back, it feels just like coming home. I'm really looking forward to working with Barbara [Windsor], Steve [McFadden], Sid [Owen] and Patsy [Palmer] and I'm over the moon to be working with the new boss Diederick Santer. I can't wait to get the scripts to see what Sam Mitchell has been up to since she was last in the Square."

Executive Producer Santer said, "With all the turmoil facing the Mitchells this year, it feels like a great time to bring back Sam, the original Mitchell sister. I'd like to take this opportunity to thank Kim Medcalf for her great work playing Sam Mitchell for three years and welcome Danniella back to pick up the baton once again." In an interview with media website Digital Spy, Santer discussed the reasoning behind his decision to reintroduce Sam: "What makes Sam interesting for me is that she's Ricky's first love and first wife. As Bianca and Ricky spend more time together [...] the inevitability of them at some point coming together increases. What's stopping them? Well, it's Sam. Sam and Ricky had a good thing going all those years ago. All Ricky ever gets off Bianca is indifference, whereas Sam – and who knows quite why – is less than indifferent towards him and it makes a nice change".

Santer acknowledged that Sam's return posed a problem for the show, because when the character was last seen, she was "on the run" in Brazil. However, he indicated that the storyliners had found a way to get around this. Westbrook later admitted she was not nervous about her return. She filmed her first scenes in the first week of June, for episodes that were broadcast on 4 September 2009. On 26 August a trailer was released to promote the character's return, noted for its similarity to the opening credits of Secret Diary of a Call Girl. 7.6 million viewers watched her return episode.

Westbrook was contracted for three months, and although it was extended slightly, she departed from the show at the end of her storyline in the episode broadcast on 11 January 2010. In an interview given with Digital Spy, Diederick Santer said: "When Danniella and I first sat down to talk about her return, we discussed a particular storyline with a specific length of contract. These plans haven't changed. Danniella has done brilliantly and I hope that she will be back with us at some point in the future." Westbrook filmed her final scenes at the end of October 2009.

In June 2010, it was confirmed that Westbrook would return to film scenes for broadcast later in the year. Santer's successor, Bryan Kirkwood told Digital Spy, "When Sam Mitchell is in Albert Square, trouble is never far behind. We last saw her heading for a stretch in prison and ostracised by her family. When she returns on her release, it's with a lot of grudges and a big secret. Danniella brings a lot of fun and mischief to the role of Sam and I'm looking forward to having her back where she belongs". Her return was broadcast on 20 August 2010 and centred around a "Who's the daddy?" storyline, when Sam revealed she was pregnant and unsure who was her baby's father, Ricky or Jack Branning (with whom she had been cheating on Ricky). After the completion of this storyline in which Jack was confirmed as her baby's father, Sam departed once again. Her final episode aired on 21 September 2010.

==== Brief return (2016) ====
On 27 February 2016, it was confirmed that Westbrook would reprise the role for four episodes. Her return would coincide with that of Ross Kemp as her brother Grant and the final appearance from Barbara Windsor as their mother, Peggy. Of her return, Westbrook said, "I'm really excited to be going back to EastEnders." Executive producer Dominic Treadwell-Collins said: "It is only right that all of Peggy Mitchell's children would be at her funeral. Danniella is the final piece of the Mitchell jigsaw puzzle, so it will be great for viewers to see Phil, Grant and Sam all back on screen. Sam will only be back for a few episodes, but these scenes are bound to go down in the soap's history." Westbrook returned to filming on 3 May 2016. Her return scenes aired on 30 June, with her final scenes on 8 July.

In September 2020, Westbrook claimed to be "in talks" to reprise the role; however, a spokesperson denied this, saying: "There are no current plans for Danniella to return to EastEnders."

=== Medcalf's return (2022–2026) ===
On 29 January 2022, it was announced that Medcalf would reprise the role once again, taking over from Westbrook for the second time. Upon her return, Medcalf said "When the BBC approached me last year to reprise the role of Sam I was thrilled," said Medcalf. "She's a brilliant character and I can't wait to get back in the Square and work with the amazing cast of both familiar and new faces." Producer Kate Oates said: "The Mitchells are one of the most iconic families in soap, and I have long wanted to bring Sam back into the family fold." Westbrook reacted to Medcalf reprising the role by threatening to sue the BBC. Medcalf returned to filming on 8 February 2022. Her return scenes aired in the United Kingdom on 18 April 2022.

In August 2022, executive producer Chris Clenshaw revealed that a "face from Sam past would crop up down the line". It was later announced that Nick Nevern had been cast as Sam's ex-boyfriend Don, whom Sam had been in a relationship with while living in Spain.

In December 2022, following the return of Sid Owen as Sam's ex-husband Ricky, it was announced that Sam and Ricky's romance would be revisited. Sam and Ricky reunited with Sam being offered the chance to go and live in Germany with Ricky and his family; however, Sam chose to stay in Walford with Ricky going to Germany alone, signalling the departure of Owen once again. On 13 April 2023, EastEnders aired a temporary exit for Sam. Radio Times confirmed that Medcalf was on an extended break and that she would be returning.

Executive producer Chris Clenshaw confirmed Sam's return: "Sam will be making her way back to the Square this autumn, actually, and in typical Sam Mitchell fashion, she finds herself in a troublesome place and has to ask big brother Phil to help her out of a sticky situation. Lots has happened since she's been away – obviously she's got a grandchild, Charli, but Ricky Jr. isn't happy that his mum has been so absent. I think the great thing about Sam is that she's very much a character that can kind of turn up at the Mitchells at any time, cause mayhem and leave them to sort out her mess every time. There's a lot of fun with Sam." Her onscreen return aired on 21 November 2023.

Medcalf left the role in the episode broadcast on 18 January 2024 in an unannounced departure, with the "door being left open" for her to return in the future.

==== Breast cancer ====
In November 2025, it was announced Medcalf would reprise the role of Sam for a short stint beginning in December. On 28 November 2025, the BBC announced that Sam would be diagnosed with breast cancer after discovering a lump in her breast, and that she would require a lumpectomy as part of her treatment and recovery. The storyline explores how Sam's erratic behaviour alerts Jack, Denise, and eventually Phil to encourage her to seek medical advice over the lump.

Executive producer Ben Wadey championed the storyline: "It was imperative that we worked with Breast Cancer Now to ensure that Sam's important breast cancer storyline was portrayed sensitively and accurately. Sam is initially hesitant to seek medical advice after she finds a lump in her breast but with the support of family and friends, Sam gets help quickly, and because her cancer is caught early, she's able to successfully remove her breast lump via a lumpectomy in the New Year". Sally Kum, associate director of nursing and health information at Breast Cancer Now, added: "Sam's experience will resonate with thousands of EastEnders viewers. We've drawn on our insights and extensive expertise supporting people affected by breast cancer to help guide this storyline and ensure it's portrayed authentically. We know that the earlier breast cancer is diagnosed, the better the chances of successful treatment and, ultimately, of lives being saved. As such, EastEnders is delivering a vital health message by raising awareness of the importance of breast checking, knowing the signs and symptoms of breast cancer, and getting any new or unusual breast changes checked by a GP". Medcalf exited the role following Sam's departure on 26 May 2026.

== Storylines ==
=== Backstory ===
Sam Mitchell is the youngest child and only daughter of Peggy (Jo Warne/Barbara Windsor/Jaime Winstone) and Eric (George Russo). For years, Eric spoiled Sam and treated her like a princess, while Sam idolised her brothers Phil (Steve McFadden/Daniel Delaney) and Grant (Ross Kemp/Teddy Jay). By the time Eric died when Sam was ten, she was subsequently on the receiving end of her two older brothers' heavy-handed paternalism.

=== 1990–2000 ===
Fifteen-year-old Sam follows her brothers to Walford, unhappy at home because she dislikes their mother's boyfriend, Kevin Masters (Colin McCormack). She becomes friends with Hattie Tavernier (Michelle Gayle) and dates Ricky Butcher (Sid Owen). Sam's family disapproves of the relationship, so Ricky and Sam decide to elope to Gretna Green; they marry despite the Mitchells trying to stop the nuptials. Peggy admits defeat and attends their more formal blessing in Walford a month later. Sam fails to earn schooling qualifications and starts to believe that she can have a career in modelling, but when she attempts to get a portfolio done by a professional photographer, he persuades her to do a topless shoot and the photos are then published in a pornographic magazine. This causes problems in Ricky and Sam's relationship, and after just a year of marriage, Sam grows bored and begins lusting after a playboy named Clive (Sean Gallagher) whom she meets at a New Year's Eve party with her friend Mandy Salter (Nicola Stapleton). After having a brief affair, Sam thinks she has fallen in love with Clive, but he makes it clear that he is only interested in sex when he tries to coax her into having a threesome. Realising that her marriage with Ricky is over, Sam leaves her husband and Walford.

Sam returns after her brothers, on a boy's holiday in Spain, catch her in bed with David Wicks (Michael French), and force her to return. Fearful of being alone, Sam tries to come between Ricky and his girlfriend, Bianca Jackson (Patsy Palmer). Initially, Ricky thinks he still has feelings for Sam and delays divorcing her, but eventually realises he is better off with Bianca. Soon after, she meets a Spanish man named Guillermo (Robert Reina), who is holidaying in England. When he invites her to join him in the Spanish costas she leaves Walford again.

Sam returns for a fleeting visit but decides that she wants to settle down in Walford once more. During this time, she embarks on a relationship with Beppe di Marco (Michael Greco). However, Sam takes things more seriously than Beppe does. After he ends the relationship, Sam looks for comfort elsewhere, turning to local club owner and Phil's adversary Steve Owen (Martin Kemp) for support. They have a one-night stand, but he is only using her to make his fling Mel Beale (Tamzin Outhwaite) jealous. When Beppe also makes it clear that he is not interested in taking her back, a hurt Sam leaves Walford once again.

=== 2002–2005 ===
Peggy finds Sam, working in a lap-dancing club in Spain; ashamed and penniless, Sam returns to Walford with her mother. Sam has another brief relationship with Steve Owen; however, he is using her again as a final act of revenge against Phil. Following Steve's untimely death, Phil then humiliates Sam by revealing the affair in front of Steve's widow Mel and Phil's ex-girlfriend Lisa Shaw (Lucy Benjamin). Sam then proceeds to have flings with Trevor Morgan (Alex Ferns) and Dennis Rickman (Nigel Harman), respectively – as well as briefly having a relationship with her ex-lover Beppe. Sam moves in with Ricky and she redevelops feelings for him. When he ends his relationship with Natalie Evans (Lucy Speed), they have sex. She is left embarrassed when her feelings are not reciprocated by Ricky, who returns to Natalie. Sam begins a fling with Dennis' father Den Watts (Leslie Grantham) but is left humiliated after he sacks her from her job at his family's club.

When her brother Phil goes on the run after escaping prison for an armed robbery, for which he has been set up for by Den, Sam avenges him by attempting to outbuy his former wife Kate Mitchell (Jill Halfpenny) out of her business in an attempt to leave her penniless. She hires Minty Peterson (Cliff Parisi) to smash up the salon as revenge on Kate for giving up Phil's daughter Louise (Rachel Cox) to her unstable mother Lisa, and later persuades Billy to torch Phil's snooker club in an insurance scam, an act that results in Den's nightclub burning down and his daughter Vicki Fowler (Scarlett Alice Johnson) nearly perishing in the fire. She clashes with Den's adoptive daughter Sharon (Letitia Dean) over the insurance of the nightclub and Dennis vows revenge, and he is only warned off when his friend Andy Hunter (Michael Higgs), Walford's gangland kingpin, begins a relationship with Sam. She falls in love with Andy and he manages to turn her against her allies. Sam is unaware of Andy's true colours and she disowns her cousin Billy Mitchell (Perry Fenwick) when he tries to warn her about Andy's devious intentions and his affair with Kat Moon (Jessie Wallace). They marry, and soon after the wedding, Sam's world crumbles when she discovers that Paul Trueman (Gary Beadle) has been secretly selling drugs for Andy. Sam also finds out that Andy had beaten up Minty for trying to stop their wedding. Despite this, she takes him back when he promises to change. Andy later fools Sam into signing over control of Phil's house, and she is then conned out of all the Mitchell businesses by family lawyer Marcus Christie (Stephen Churchett) and Den. Andy, realising Sam is no use to him, throws her out of their house – leaving her penniless. A destitute Sam is later taken in by Minty.

While trying to move on from her marriage with Andy, she has a brief relationship with Andy's rival Danny Moon (Jake Maskall). Sam becomes determined to get revenge on Den; she teams up with his wife Chrissie (Tracy-Ann Oberman) and Kat's daughter Zoe Slater (Michelle Ryan) - who herself had become a victim of Den as a result of her relationship with Dennis - to carry out their vengeful plot against Den. On the night of Den's wedding anniversary to his late wife Angie (Anita Dobson), the three women confront him at The Queen Victoria public house shortly after he closes up. Zoe strikes Den over the head with Pauline Fowler's (Wendy Richard) iron doorstop and this is thought to have killed him; however, when Zoe and Sam leave the room, Den grabs Chrissie's ankle and she responds by hitting him on the head a second time – finally killing him. In the moment where Chrissie kills Den, however, Sam secretly witnesses this, and she later grows appalled when Chrissie allows Zoe to believe that her blow killed Den. As Chrissie has possession of The Queen Vic following Den's death, Sam blackmails her – threatening to unveil Chrissie as Den's killer unless she gives her money and later the pub. Chrissie and Sam, both complicit in Den's murder, decide to call a truce to avoid going to prison. They decide to co-run The Queen Vic, but this lasts briefly as Sam cannot trust Chrissie, leading to her being sacked.

On the day after Den's murder, to which the Square is unaware of yet, Sam is surprised to learn that Andy had died on the same night; Andy was murdered by his gangland rival Johnny Allen (Billy Murray). In the events of Andy's funeral, Sam smugly attends his will meeting; she is shocked to learn that he has left his and Sam's money to a dog's trust. She is further horrified when he leaves her nothing but a wedding ring. As she struggles to move on from Andy and their turbulent marriage, Sam learns that Chrissie is attempting to sell the pub and leave Walford. She soon begins drinking heavily and, determined to expose Chrissie as Den's killer, smashes up Den's resting place in The Queen Vic cellar and tries to dig him up. The plan backfires; all evidence points to Sam when Zoe's relative Stacey (Lacey Turner) gives Chrissie and Zoe a false alibi; telling the police that they were both with her the night Den was killed. Sam is then charged with murder, and when Peggy returns to the Square and learns about Sam's recent troubles, she visits her and Sam tells Peggy that Chrissie was the one who killed Den. Believing Sam, an outraged Peggy vows to prove her innocence. The Mitchells pay a visit to the Slaters and desperately try to pressure Stacey into dropping her story for Chrissie so that Sam can be released, but to no avail, due to interference from Kat, who is trying to protect Zoe. Eventually, with help from Sharon and Dennis – who end up learning the truth about their father's murder – the Mitchells are finally able to prevent Johnny from destroying a secret videotape of Chrissie confessing Den's murder to her boyfriend and Danny's brother, Jake (Joel Beckett). The police are given the tape and they trace Chrissie to the airport, where they arrest her for Den's murder. Sam is later released from custody but still faces a charge of perverting the course of justice and a prison sentence of up to four years. This prospect is too daunting for Sam, and with the help of Phil, she decides to flee the country while on bail. After an emotional farewell with her family, Sam leaves for Brazil.

=== 2009–2016 ===
Phil sends Ricky to Brazil on an errand where he meets Sam, and she returns with him to London, using a fake passport. She immediately causes a stir by drawing attention to herself and reignites her old feud with Bianca. The Mitchells try to keep her hidden, but Bianca, jealous of Ricky's renewed feelings for Sam, calls the police and informs them that Sam is back in the country. Sam is eventually arrested while trying to flee but is later released on bail when her cousin Ronnie (Samantha Janus) pays the surety. Sam and Ricky get engaged, but Sam has an affair with Ronnie's fiancée Jack Branning (Scott Maslen). Her uncle Archie (Larry Lamb) tells Bianca about Sam and Jack's affair, who tells Ricky, and after a showdown, Ricky ends the engagement. With Jack also deserting her, Sam takes Archie's money and flees, causing the Mitchells to lose the pub. She returns to Walford on Christmas Day, hoping to make amends. On that same day, Archie is murdered and Sam becomes one of the suspects after a confrontation with Archie prior to his death. Phil, Peggy and Ronnie also have motives, and in order to stop the police from framing them, they decide Sam should take the blame and leave the country. Sam overhears their plan and in a rage turns herself in, implicating Peggy for Archie's murder as revenge. Sam is then arrested and sentenced to 18 months in prison for her role in Den's murder, five years earlier. When Peggy attempts to visit, Sam is hostile and rejects her mother, as well as dismissing the Mitchell name.

Seven months later, Peggy visits Sam in prison and discovers she is heavily pregnant. Sam does not know if Ricky or Jack is the father and she refuses to reconcile with Peggy; however, when she is hospitalised and goes into labour, she reconsiders, requesting Peggy's help. Sam gives birth to a boy, Richard, but announces that she is giving him up for adoption. She only reconsiders as a means to reconcile with Ricky; she returns to Walford, having been released from prison early, but struggles with motherhood after Peggy decides to move away from the square. Ricky and Jack pester Sam to get a paternity test, and she lies about the results, claiming Ricky is the father; however, Bianca discovers the truth and Sam confesses that she had lied because Ronnie asked her to. Ronnie does not want Sam or Richard near Jack and manipulates her into leaving Walford and offers Sam money to do so. Sam decides to leave but, fearful of bringing up her baby alone, she seduces Minty into leaving with her. He soon realises Sam is using him and turns her down. Sam departs with Richard, alone, moving to Portugal to live with Grant.

Almost six years later, Sam briefly returns to Walford alongside Richard, now nicknamed Ricky (Henri Charles), to attend Peggy's funeral. Jack decides that he wants to meet Ricky, so Sam allows this to happen. She then reveals to her cousin Roxy (Rita Simons) that she has been struggling to look after Ricky in Portugal and that he is better off with Jack. Sam secretly abandons Ricky at Jack and Ronnie's house and leaves in the back of a taxi, returning to Portugal.

=== 2022–2026 ===
Sam, now living in Spain, returns to visit Phil in prison after he summons her back to the UK on business. When Sam arrives back in Walford, Sharon, and Kat are unhappy to see her, and she reveals that Phil has left her in charge of his assets again, while he is in prison. Sam is then reunited with her son Ricky (now played by Frankie Day), much to the consternation of Jack and his civil partner Denise Fox (Diane Parish). Phil asks Sam to attend a business meeting with his money laundering associate Jonah Tyler (Mark Mooney). Sam agrees but fails to negotiate a deal with Jonah due to interference from Sharon, and in retaliation, Jonah threatens to launch a rivalry against Phil's businesses if she cannot fund protection. Feeling defeated, Sam prepares to go back to Spain, but when she sees how close Jack is with Ricky, she lies by threatening to take Ricky with her unless Jack helps her find incriminating information on Jonah. Jack accompanies Sam to meet with Jonah and she uses Jack's position as a Detective Inspector to blackmail Jonah into ending his threats and doing exactly what she wants; by accepting her offer of a higher markup percent on their business deal. Sam discovers that Jonah is planning on buying Ruby Allen's (Louisa Lytton) nightclub, and she convinces Phil that they should buy the club and run it together. She decides to turn the club into a wine bar renaming it "Peggy's". She sacks staff members Dotty Cotton (Milly Zero) and Vinny Panesar (Shiv Jalota) in the process, leading to Phil replacing Sam with Sharon as bar manager. Sam is unimpressed by Phil's decision to demote her, and after a failed attempt to reason with him, she attempts to blackmail Sharon by threatening to tell Kat about her secret prison visits with Phil, if she does not reinstate her back as bar manager. Sharon reminds her of the consequences of crossing Phil, so Sam begrudgingly backs down. She later sleeps with Sharon's younger half-brother Zack Hudson (James Farrar), who is cheating on his girlfriend Nancy Carter (Maddy Hill). Just before the opening of Peggy's, Sam, Kat, Sharon, and Nancy's grandmother Shirley Carter (Linda Henry) are all held hostage by robbers who attempt to rob the bar, under the presumption that they have been sent by Jonah. The incident results in Sam getting shot, as a result of saving Kat, though it is later revealed that Sam had orchestrated the siege as revenge on Sharon and Kat for her downfall in the Mitchell empire. Shirley later discovers what Sam has been up to, and blackmails her for a share of the bar.

Sam continues to disturb Sharon and Kat with threats under the disguise of Jonah, and she plans to manipulate Kat into signing control of Peggy's to Jonah, though Kat is unaware that she will be signing it over to Sam instead. It is later revealed that Sam is secretly working with Jonah to fleece her family, but her plans are stalled when Phil is released early from prison. She is forced to repay Jonah by allowing his men to sell drugs in the bar, however, this goes wrong when Zack unknowingly reports one of Jonah's men to the police for dealing drugs in the club. Sam confides in Zack and tells him everything about Jonah blackmailing her and making threats. Sam's nephew Ben (Max Bowden) purchases drugs from Jonah's dealers and almost dies from an overdose. Phil discovers that Sam had allowed this to happen, and disowns her. Sam tries to make it up to Phil and teams up with Zack to kidnap Ben's rapist Lewis Butler (Aidan O'Callaghan), so Phil can get revenge on Lewis for raping Ben. Sam drives with Phil to an abandoned warehouse, in a rented car with Lewis tied up in the boot. Just as they proceed to untie Lewis, an argument between Phil and Sam results in Phil unknowingly leaving the boot open, enabling Lewis to secretly escape. Lewis then lures them into the warehouse and manages to steal Phil's gun and holds both Phil and Sam at gunpoint in the warehouse, until Phil attacks him, grabs the gun and almost shoots him, but he is stopped by Ben.

After months of blackmail from Shirley, she finally threatens to tell Phil everything unless Sam pays her more money, but Sam rebuffs Shirley's threats. Just as Shirley plans to go to Phil's house to expose Sam, Jonah shows up and also demands money from Sam. Phil sees Jonah confronting Sam and attacks him. Just before Jonah leaves, Phil is suspicious when he calls Sam a "snake", and Shirley eventually reveals that Sam had been secretly scheming with Jonah against him. Phil then throws Sam out of his house and she also faces the wrath of both Sharon and Kat when they find out that Sam had been responsible for the threats and the siege. Jack finds out about Sam's homelessness and he lets her stay in one of his flats so that she can remain close to Ricky. Sam continues her fling with Zack in the aftermath of Nancy's departure; however, her ex-boyfriend Don (Nick Nevern) arrives from Spain and tries to win her back by proposing. Sam turns him down and lies that she is pregnant with Zack's child so Don will back down and leave Walford. Sam realises that she wants a serious relationship with Zack but he rejects her. While trying to spend more time with Ricky, Sam sneaks into Jack's house to bribe her cousin and Ricky's half-sister Amy Mitchell (Ellie Dadd) into inviting her to her birthday party so that she can be with Ricky. She accidentally walks in on Amy self-harming. Amy agrees to invite her if she promises not to tell her father, Jack, although Sam later does, resulting in Amy resenting her.

Sam is reunited with her ex-husband, Ricky Butcher (Sid Owen), who has returned to Walford to visit his sister Janine (Charlie Brooks). Sam rejects Ricky after he re-develops feelings for her, but Janine's fiancé Mick Carter (Danny Dyer) persuades her to go on a date with him. Sam later agrees to be Ricky's plus-one at Mick and Janine's wedding. When Phil's nemesis Keanu Taylor (Danny Walters) returns to Walford, Sam is initially hostile towards him. It is later revealed that they previously had a fling while in Spain together. Sam is suspicious of Keanu's reasons for coming back and investigates his behaviour. She follows him to a car park and catches him meeting with Phil's other nemesis DCI Samantha Keeble (Alison Newman). She reports this to Phil and reveals that Keanu is an informer, but when Phil refuses to take action, Sam lures Keanu to Peggy's and attempts to seduce him to gain a confession. Sam goes on another date with Ricky on New Year's Eve. He then asks her to move to Germany with him once he secures sole custody of his niece Scarlett (Tabitha Byron), but she does not respond immediately. Sam then abandons Ricky when she receives a text from Phil, inviting her to join him and the rest of the family in Peggy's bar to welcome in the New Year, and to make amends. Soon afterwards she agrees to move to Germany with Ricky. However, it is revealed that twelve-year-old resident Lily Slater (Lillia Turner) has fallen pregnant and she names Sam's son Ricky as the father following a one-night stand. As Sam tells Ricky Jnr that she is moving to Germany, he reveals to Sam that he has impregnated Lily and could face police questioning. Sam tells Jack and Denise, making Ricky Jnr furious. He later confides in Sam about becoming a father and asks her to remain in Walford and not move away with Ricky Butcher. Sam breaks the news to Ricky that she cannot leave her son again, and he leaves for Germany with Scarlett. Sam later tells the Brannings that she has decided to stay in Walford and vows to support her son. Lily chooses to keep her baby and Jack intervenes by trying to manipulate Lily into changing her mind, but upon Lily's mother Stacey Slater (Lacey Turner) finding out, she bans the Brannings and Mitchells from having anything to do with Lily's baby. An upset Ricky Jnr decides to move in with Sam. Soon after, Sam receives a text from the Sexual Health Clinic, informing her that a previous partner has tested positive for an STI. She makes an appointment at the clinic and it is confirmed that she is negative. Sam then discovers that the text was about Zack and he opens up to her about his HIV diagnosis.

In April 2023, Sam receives a call from Don, offering her the opportunity to manage his luxurious new bar in a hotel in Spain. Sam is tempted by the offer but is unsure whether to take it because she does not want to leave Ricky once again. Honey Mitchell (Emma Barton) encourages Sam to take the job temporarily so she can financially support Ricky when his baby is born. Sam promises Ricky that she will be back to support him and that she is not abandoning him again. She then bids an emotional goodbye to Ricky, Jack and Honey before departing for Spain once again. One month later, Jack receives a call from Sam and she tells him the hotel staff are inundated and they need her to stay on for at least the summer. Several months later, Sam returns to the square when she is thrown out of a white van by a henchman whose boss she owes money to; she tells Phil that she has 24 hours to come up with £100,000 after she became involved in drug dealing whilst in Spain. Sam later meets up with the kingpin Camillo (Marco Zingaro) and he threatens to kill her if she does not pay him. Kat sees him trying to bundle Sam into his car and immediately tells Phil and Billy Mitchell (Perry Fenwick), who rush to Sam’s aid. Phil later agrees to pay Camillo the £100,000 and tells Sam she can pay him back by working in Peggy’s for free until the debt is cleared. Sam once again throws herself into the middle of proving herself to her family, but Phil does not show her any respect or affection. In January 2024, the Mitchells find out that their Aunt Sal (Anna Karen) has died. At her wake, Sam discovers that Sal left her £33,000 in her will and is furious when Phil refuses to give her the money. Unfortunately for Phil, Sam finds out from Alfie Moon (Shane Richie) that Phil had slept with Emma Harding (Patsy Kensit), the mother of their dead relative Lola Pearce-Brown (Danielle Harold), days before marrying Kat. Sam uses this information to blackmail Phil into giving her the money, otherwise she will tell Kat. Phil eventually gives her the money but belittles her in the process, and tells her to leave Walford. Sam then reveals everything to a packed pub, which is celebrating Kat and Phil's joint birthday. Kat declares that she is leaving Phil, while Phil disowns Sam once again and threatens her to leave the Square. Having been ousted by her family, Sam steals money from Phil’s safe and leaves it in an envelope for Ricky and then departs Walford for Canada.

Sam returns to Walford in December 2025 and immediately steals money from Phil's safe before meeting Ricky and informing him she intends to leave a sum of money for him in a trust fund. Her presence is soon discovered by Phil – who intercepts her before her intended departure and retrieves his money – and Jack, who demands to know why she has returned; Sam reveals she is suffering from breast cancer. Though initially reluctant to seek medical attention, Sam agrees to undergo a biopsy provided that Jack and Denise give her money for Ricky's trust fund. Sam subsequently moves in with Phil as she awaits the biopsy but decides to take advantage of Phil's friend Nigel Bates' (Paul Bradley) dementia by posing as his adoptive daughter Clare (Gemma Bissix) to defraud him of the money. Sam's deception is swiftly uncovered by Phil and Nigel's wife, Julie Bates (Karen Henthorn), who responds by punching Sam in the face. Nevertheless, Nigel persuades Phil to allow Sam to remain in the house.

Sam is reunited with Zoe, who immediately accuses Sam of being her stalker, an allegation Sam disputes. Regardless, Sam's feud with Zoe and Kat reignites, but Sam eventually confides in Kat about her cancer. On Christmas Day, Sam celebrates with her family but notices Chrissie entering the Queen Vic; she subsequently follows her there and joins Kat and Zoe in confronting Chrissie and Zoe's long-lost daughter Jasmine Fisher (Indeyarna Donaldson-Holness) when it emerges they have been working together to torment Zoe. Sam convinces Jasmine to turn her back on Chrissie but fails to convince Chrissie to change her ways.

She decides to stay on Albert Square while she completes her cancer treatment, forming a friendship with Denise and encouraging her to go to the doctor when she begins feeling fatigued, and decides to stay around longer when Phil and Julie begin struggling as Nigel deteriorates and eventually dies. She reunites with Grant when he returns to Walford, and attempts to help him bond with his estranged son, Mark Fowler (Stephen Aaron-Sipple) by telling Grant that Mark is heavily in debt to gangster Russell Delaney (Anthony Skordi), an old acquaintance of the Mitchells who Sam and Grant have history with, as Grant previously slept with his wife, and Sam slept with Delaney and then stole from him. Grant punches Delaney, resulting in Mark's debt being doubled with only a week to pay. This leads Sam to help Mark torch cars that Lauren Branning (Jacqueline Jossa) has been selling in order to convince her to begin selling vehicles stolen by Mark instead. Just before Nigel's funeral, Mark is kidnapped by Delaney and his henchmen, who demand that Grant and Sam repay their respective debts to him. Sam tricks him by giving him an expensive watch she falsely claims belonged to Nigel, which Delaney accepts as repayment, and Mark is rescued. Sam leaves Walford with Grant for Portugal.

== Reception ==
Westbrook has said that within days of her first appearance as Sam in 1990, the public and media interest in her character was 'phenomenal'. The character has been reintroduced multiple times, with producer Matthew Robinson referring to her as 'popular'. Kim Medcalf as Sam Mitchell won a National TV Award in 2002 for most popular newcomer.

The direction taken with the character was viewed critically in 2004, with Paul Clark of The Stage using Sam as an example of how EastEnders had become unbelievable. He commented, 'The rot set in around the time when one of the show's female leads, Sam, metamorphosed from introspective beauty into oestrogen-fuelled Al Caponette, making Billy burn down Den's club.' The Guardian claimed in 2004 that the soap opera had come under 'heavy fire' for 'poor storylines', among them Sam's wedding to gangster Andy Hunter.

Stuart Heritage, of The Guardian, commented on the recasting of Sam in June 2010, saying 'Medcalf lacked Westbrook's obvious aura of constant threat, but still managed to help bludgeon Dirty Den's head in with a metal dog before leaving so that – in a bonkers soap twist – Westbrook could return again.' Kevin O'Sullivan, writing for the Sunday Mirror, was critical of Danniella Westbrook's return in 2009, highlighting an 'inexplicable personality transplant' in Sam and decrying the 'homecoming' storyline as 'an insult to long-suffering viewers' intelligence'. Comparatively, Virgin Media have rated Sam/Westbrook's return in 2009 as the tenth greatest soap comeback of all time, saying 'She was only on screen for five seconds before the famous 'Enders drums signalled the return of Walford's much-missed Mitchell sister. It may not have been a big surprise to see Sam back, but those scriptwriters sure know how to leave us gasping for more.'

Ruth Deller, of entertainment website lowculture.co.uk, criticised Sam's return in 2009, branding it as unsuccessful and also stating: 'Danniella Westbrook is doing her best, but the scriptwriters don't seem to know who Sam is any more. Sam mark 1 and Sam mark 2 were very different, and Sam mark 1 rebooted seems to be a third person altogether. Is she a canny businesswoman or completely thick? Is she ugly or attractive? Are we supposed to be rooting for her or rallying against her?' She further faulted her story-'lining adding: 'Her storylines don't seem to be going anywhere and the whole return seems like it was concocted purely for headlines and not at all for story development.'

In 2014, Matt Bramford from What to Watch put Sam on his list of the 18 best recastings in British and Australian soap operas, commenting, "The feisty and manipulative Mitchell sister had her fair share of drama, almost as much as Danniella herself". In 2020, Sara Wallis and Ian Hyland from The Daily Mirror placed Sam 84th on their ranked list of the best EastEnders characters of all time, calling her a "wildchild".

After Medcalf reprised the role in 2022, viewers were in agreement that her return to playing Sam "was a real coup". Viewers have said that Medcalf "makes the character so watchable and multi-layered". Following Medcalf's break from the series, viewers and critics were glad to have her back and missed her on the series. Metro's Maisie Spackman said that she "can't wait to see Sam back on our screens" and hoped that Medcalf would be given a huge storyline.
