= Julie Bates =

Fictional character from EastEnders

- EastEnders character
- Portrayed by: Karen Henthorn
- Duration: 1997–1998, 2025–2026
- First appearance: Episode 1504; 15 September 1997
- Last appearance: Episode 7334; 21 May 2026
- Introduced by: Jane Harris (1997); Chris Clenshaw (2025); Ben Wadey (2025)
In-universe information
- Other names: Julie Haye
- Occupation: Teacher
- Husband: Eliot Saunders (backstory); Nigel Bates (2000-2026)
- Sons: Josh Saunders
- Stepdaughters: Clare Bates (adoptive)

Julie Bates (also Haye) is a fictional character in the BBC soap opera EastEnders played by Karen Henthorn. She originally appeared between 15 September 1997 and 30 April 1998.

Julie was introduced as a love interest for the established character Nigel Bates (Paul Bradley). After "a whirlwind affair", the couple leave the soap together for a new life in Scotland. She made an unannounced voice-only return on 6 January 2025. On 26 June 2025, it was announced that Julie would return full-time later in the year to coincide with Nigel's ongoing dementia storyline. She returned on 15 July. After Nigel's funeral, she departed on 21 May 2026.

== Creation and development ==
Julie Haye was introduced in September 1997 as a love interest for the character Nigel Bates (Paul Bradley). Actress Karen Henthorn was cast in the role. Henthorn had previously auditioned to play the minor role of a pregnancy counsellor for the character Bianca Jackson (Patsy Palmer). She wasn't offered the part, but instead asked to audition for the much bigger role of Julie. Having been called back to Elstree Studios to discuss the role with the casting director, Henthorn was told that EastEnders were creating a new "semi-regular" character, Julie Haye, specifically as a love interest for Nigel Bates. Actor Paul Bradley, who played Nigel, had decided to leave the serial the following year, reportedly for fear of being typecast. As Nigel was "such a popular character", and because he had such an unsuccessful love live throughout the course of the show, the producers of EastEnders felt that the viewing public would not want him to have anything other than a "happy ending". So Julie was being introduced as a vehicle for Nigel's exit. Because the character was in the process of being conceptualised, the casting director asked Henthorn to read through scenes from previous episodes of EastEnders between Nigel and his deceased wife, Debbie (Nicola Duffett). The audition proved successful and they re-called Henthorn to read through some new scenes, which she had to learn for a screen test. Henthorn has commented: "This meeting was with the same director and two casting directors and took place on the Friday morning. I was offered the job that lunchtime!"

Henthorn was a fan of EastEnders before she worked on it; she commented: "I could hardly contain myself the first time I actually saw Albert Square – in the flesh. I ran all the way round the houses, up and down the steps, knocked on all the doors, peered through the windows of the Queen Vic, jumped around the garden and finally ended up sitting on Arthur's bench – exhausted and totally overwhelmed. It looked exactly the same as it does on the telly and everything is "real", apart from the buildings – there's nothing behind the walls!"

Viewers saw Nigel – dubbed "the Albert Square nerd" – fall in love with Julie as they tried to sort out his problematic stepdaughter, Clare (Gemma Bissix). In a plot twist, Julie was given a son named Josh, who had already formed a romance with Nigel's daughter Clare before his connection with Julie was revealed. Julie's son, Josh, was played by Jon Lee, who went on to find greater fame as a singer in the successful pop band, S Club 7. A slow on/off romance develops between Nigel and Julie, which progresses into 1998 and eventually leads to the departure of both characters. Nigel is initially shown to struggle with the guilt of moving on following the death of his wife Debbie, who was killed in the serial in 1995 in a hit-and-run accident. Faced with Nigel's uncertainty, Julie makes plans to leave Walford for a teaching job in Scotland; however, moments before she leaves, Nigel changes his mind and opts to move to Scotland with her. The characters make their final appearances in April 1998. A source at the time said: "Nigel deserves a happy ending."

Actress Karen Henthorn has since reflected on her time in EastEnders: "I tried to keep an open mind regarding any expectations of the job. To be honest, I hadn't got a clue what to expect. All I did know was that, because up until then, I, like the majority of actors, had spent years in and out of work (but mostly out). I had been struggling financially and creatively, had waited on more tables and pulled more pints than I care to remember. I was absolutely, without a shadow of a doubt, going to appreciate every single second, enjoy the whole experience. Which I did – whilst I was actually at work. But when I was away from the working environment, getting recognised in the street everywhere I went, being followed, pointed at, photographed, this was something I didn't expect. And it happened overnight – one day, you can't get anyone's assistance in the supermarket, the next, they're queuing up to carry your shopping home! Fame didn't change me – it changed people round me. It was a very 'interesting' experience which took quite a while to get used to."

== Storylines ==
=== 1997–1998 ===
Julie Haye is the teacher of Clare Bates (Gemma Bissix). She is first seen at a parent-teacher meeting in September 1997, where she informs Clare's guardian, Nigel Bates (Paul Bradley), that Clare is associating with a gang of bullies. Clare is initially against Julie's interference, but with Nigel's help, the bullying is eventually curtailed. Julie occasionally visits Nigel's video shop to rent French films, and they become friends. Julie intends to put on a play about the history of Walford and persuades Nigel to help organise it. The play prompts local interest and everyone wants to be involved. Julie kisses Nigel one night after a play committee meeting, but Nigel does not reciprocate, so she is embarrassed. Meanwhile, Clare has begun dating a fellow pupil at her school named Josh Saunders (Jon Lee), who is Julie's son. Julie is divorced from Josh's father Eliot Saunders (Lawrence Lambert), and uses her maiden name so Josh will not be bullied by other pupils. Eliot is unhappy that Julie is planning to take Josh to live in Scotland, which also saddens Nigel. Regretting his prior reticence, Nigel asks Julie to dinner. Their date goes well and they end the evening with a kiss.

Julie's play rehearsals go ahead amidst many problems, mainly concerning casting, as everyone wants the best roles. She also manages to offend Nigel when she recasts his role to Alex Healy (Richard Driscoll). Nigel begins to think that Julie does not reciprocate his feelings, but after much moping Julie reassures him that she really is interested, and invites herself to stay the night at his house. However, the following day, the rose bush that Nigel planted in his dead wife's honour is discovered dead. He sees this as a bad omen and ends his relationship with Julie without explanation. Julie is furious and Clare's attempts to get them back together fail. Nigel regrets his decision but he finds it impossible to tell Julie how he feels as she is too busy organising her play. The play is performed and is a success. Depressed, Nigel shuns the after party, which saddens Julie as she is leaving for Scotland the next day and is unable to say goodbye. Just as her taxi is driving away, Nigel stops it, confesses his love to Julie and asks if he and Clare can come to Scotland with her and Josh. Julie agrees and comes to collect Nigel and Clare later, to begin their new life together as a family in Scotland. Nigel and Julie marry in 2000.

=== 2025–2026 ===
In December 2024, Nigel returns to Walford and tells his friend Phil Mitchell (Steve McFadden) that he has split up with Julie as she is in a relationship with another man, making him homeless. However, on Christmas Day he receives a text from Julie asking him to return home. In January 2025, Julie sends Nigel a voicemail asking him to return home. Six months later, Jay Brown (Jamie Borthwick) contacts Julie and informs her that Nigel is living with Phil after his mental state continues to decline. She returns and is upset to discover Nigel doesn't remember her initially. He eventually does however and Julie decides to take Nigel with her back to Scotland only to return a few days later after Nigel was asking for Phil, subsequently deciding to move in with Phil to share the load of caring for Nigel. She gets a job as a teacher at Walford High and is asked by Vicki Fowler (Alice Haig) to speak to her increasingly misogynystic stepson, Joel Marshall (Max Murray), regarding his views on women but Julie is unsuccessful and Vicki is subsequently attacked by Joel. By the end of 2025, Nigel's mental and physical health continues to decline and, after an incident in which a confused Nigel accidentally hits Julie, she considers the possibility of placing Nigel into a care home, something Phil is against. Julie is enraged when Phil attempts to take Nigel to Portugal on holiday to visit Phil's brother, Grant Mitchell (Ross Kemp), leading Julie briefly to move her and Nigel out of Phil's to stay at Elaine Peacock's (Harriet Thorpe) boutique hotel though she and Phil eventually make amends and they move back to Phil's. Julie and Phil are devastated when Nigel dies in late April 2026. After Nigel's funeral, Julie opens a letter that Nigel had written to her with Phil's support. She discovers that Nigel had a pension to pay for their planned trip to India. After telling Phil to look to the future in honour of Nigel, Julie leaves Walford.

== Reception ==
A writer from Inside Soap called Julie "kindly". Chloe Timms from the same magazine praised EastEnders for bringing Julie and Jean Slater (Gillian Wright) together in scenes. For her role as Julie, Henthorn was longlisted for "Best Actress" at the 2026 Inside Soap Awards.
