= Clare Bates =

- EastEnders character
- Gemma Bissix as Clare Bates (2026)
- Portrayed by: Gemma Bissix (1993–2008, 2026); Uncredited (2025)
- Duration: 1993–1998; 2008; 2025–2026
- First appearance: Episode 879; 6 July 1993
- Last appearance: Episode 7333; 20 May 2026
- Introduced by: Leonard Lewis (1993); Diederick Santer (2008); Chris Clenshaw (2025); Ben Wadey (2026)
In-universe information
- Other names: Clare Tyler
- Occupation: Student; Receptionist
- Father: Liam Tyler
- Mother: Debbie Bates
- Adoptive father: Nigel Bates
- Stepmother: Julie Bates (adoptive)
- Daughters: Bella
- Grandmothers: Maxine Palmer

Clare Bates (also Tyler) is a fictional character from the BBC soap opera EastEnders, played by Gemma Bissix. Bissix originally played the character as a schoolgirl from 1993 to 1998. She left the serial with her adoptive father Nigel Bates, when his actor Paul Bradley opted to leave. Following a ten-year hiatus, Bissix returned to the role in February 2008. The character was transformed from "cute and sweet" into a gold digging "maneater", chasing wealthy men for their money. The British media focused on the character's penchant for revealing clothing, and while she was praised by some critics, it was suggested that she was underused upon her return. Bissix again left EastEnders at the end of her contract in mid 2008. Her departing episode aired in August of that year. The character appeared in May 2025 in an uncredited cameo as a vision within Nigel's mind. The following year, Bissix reprised the role for a short stint when Clare returned to Walford on 4 March as part of Nigel's dementia storyline, and again on 20 May for Nigel's funeral.

== Creation and development ==
=== Initial stint (1993–1998) ===
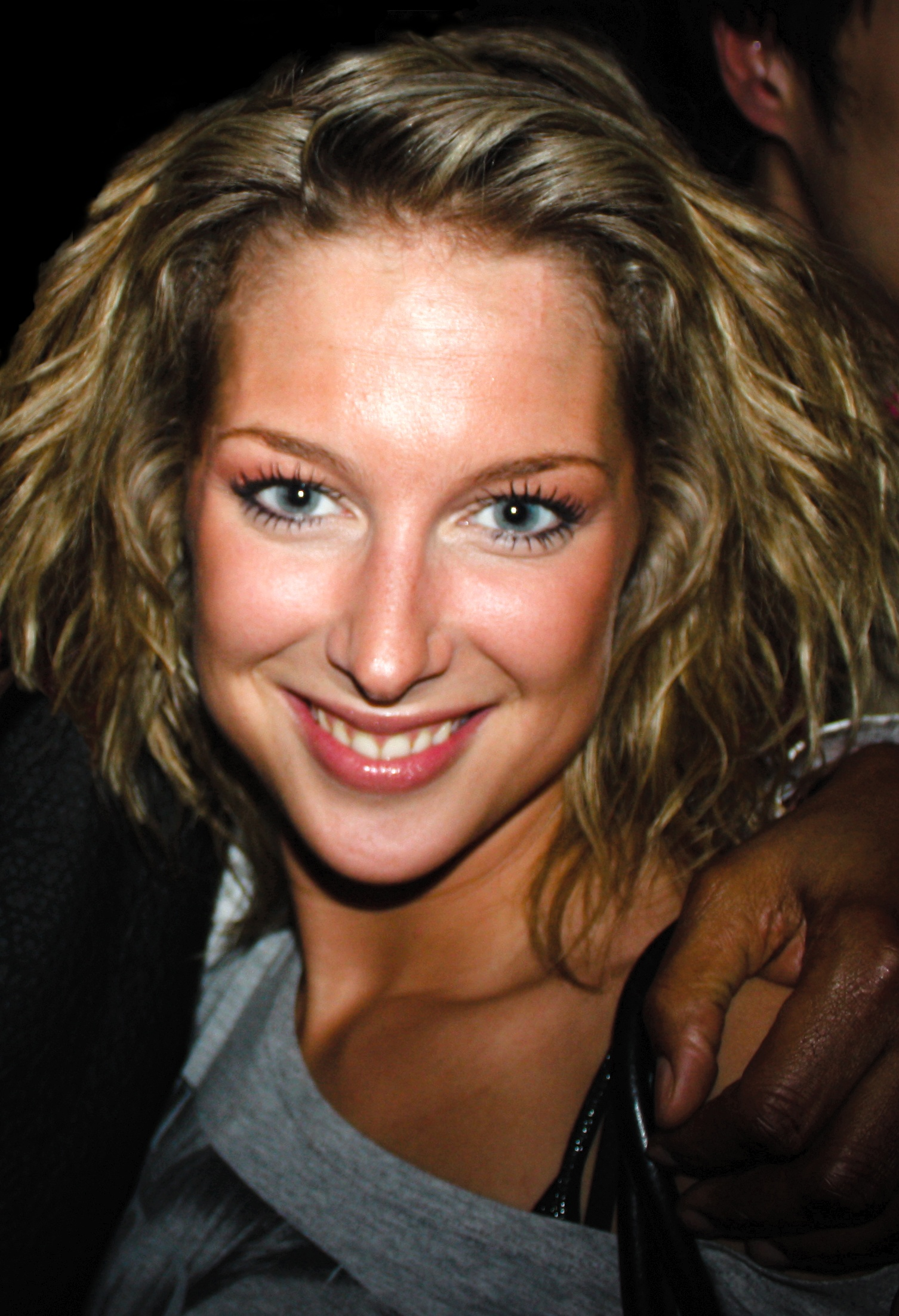
Gemma Bissix portrayed Clare

Clare Tyler (later Bates) was introduced by the executive producer of EastEnders, Leonard Lewis. Gemma Bissix was cast in the role. Reflecting on the casting process in 2001, Bissix said, "I was nine when I started on EastEnders. I did drama classes after school and my mum took me to an audition. There were about 50 others. I read through the script and by the time I was home they had phoned my dad to tell him I had the role. I was only supposed to be in it for three episodes, but it turned into five years." It was her first acting job and she had received no formal training. In 2008, Bissix stated, "that was my training [...] quite a lot of people [attend] drama school, I was trained by EastEnders." The character made her first appearance in July 1993 as the daughter of Debbie Tyler (Nicola Duffett), a love interest for an EastEnders regular character, Nigel Bates (Paul Bradley).

Clare's introductory storyline focused upon domestic violence – her father Liam Tyler's (Francis Magee) physical abuse of her mother Debbie – and being caught between her feuding parents. Later storylines involved the death of her mother, who was killed in a hit-and-run accident in 1995, and a subsequent custody battle between her father and stepfather, which ultimately led to Nigel being given custody of Clare. After six years in the serial, the character was written out in 1998 as a result of Paul Bradley's decision to leave, reportedly for fear of being typecast in the role of Nigel the "nerd". The writers of EastEnders wanted to give Nigel a happy ending, so a character named Julie Haye (Karen Henthorn) was invented to be a love interest for Nigel, whilst her son, Josh Saunders (Jon Lee), was invented to be a love interest for Clare. In the storyline, Nigel fell for Julie, Clare's teacher, as they tried to sort out Clare's problematic behaviour at school. Simultaneously, Clare fell for Julie's son Josh, and when the storyline reached its climax in April 1998, the Bates family relocated to Scotland to begin a new life with Julie and Josh. Since her initial departure, actress Gemma Bissix has commented on her character's exit from the soap: "it was the right time for the character to go. Besides, when you get to 15 and haven't been able to cut your hair for six years, you want a change."

=== Reintroduction (2008) ===
"Prepare for the return of an old face, as Gemma Bissix returns to Walford in the New Year to reprise her role as Clare Bates...Drama always followed Clare when she was in Walford, and her return promises no change. Clare comes back to stay with Dot, who is thrilled to see her. But why does Clare behave so strangely when she's asked about Nigel?"

— bbc.co.uk, 19 September 2007

In September 2007, an official BBC press report announced that actress would reprise the role of Clare ten years after her initial departure. Bissix was approached about returning by the executive producer of EastEnders, Diederick Santer, following her successful stint as soap villain Clare Devine in Channel 4's Hollyoaks. Commenting on her reintroduction, Bissix has said, "To be able to reprise the role of Clare, who I played when I was a child, is such a great compliment. It's fantastic to grab something that once was and try and develop it into something different. I'm loving every minute." Bissix made her reappearance as Clare on 1 February 2008 — in her first scene, she was seen being thrown out of the back of a car by her lover, the CEO of a big company.

=== Characterisation ===
Unlike the "cute, sweet" character she appeared to be during the 1990s, Clare was transformed into a "man-eating bitch" upon her reintroduction in 2008; a gold digger, chasing after wealthy men for their money. Bissix has said, "Myself, Diederick [Santer] and [story producer] Dominic [Treadwell-Collins] had a characterisation session and we discussed what Clare's been doing and how she's got to where she is now. Her back story has played a big part in how I'm developing the character."

As part of the character's new look, Bissix was required to wear revealing clothing regularly. She has commented, "That is her character. She thinks she looks sexy and she reckons that's what it takes to get blokes on their knees. You can't blame her – it works for most."

Explaining the reasons for her character's personality change, Bissix said "I think it's just the fact that she's lonely. When she was in Scotland Nigel and Julie were getting on with their own thing. Through no fault of Nigel's she just got pushed out of the family. She's not his real child, her mum's dead and her dad was in prison and is a bit of a wrong un. She went to university and was mistreated by a few men. Now she uses her looks to her advantage. Now she's using the men and treating them badly...she's never felt settled. Her mother died, her father was abusive and she doesn't even know him. She's never felt like she's fitted in. Clare's 'mystery' is brought about by her looking for that father figure and needing that kind of attention, which then leads her into preying on the men of Walford. That's how she makes her money. Her forté is finding men with money and using her assets to entice them and rip them off..."

=== Gold digging ===
The character's first return storyline concentrated on her attempt to seduce and then blackmail wealthy resident Ian Beale (Adam Woodyatt). An EastEnders insider said: "Ian has been completely blown away by Clare ever since she returned to the Square. She is a saucy little minx and will stop at nothing to get him into bed. But she's not really interested in him – she just wants his money. So Ian is really playing with fire and risking his marriage just by being alone with Clare. But he's more of a silly old fool than anything – although I'm not sure that Jane will see it like that, especially if she finds out about their kiss. And Clare being Clare, she probably will – unless of course Ian pays her to keep quiet." However, in the storyline, Clare's games were eventually halted when Ian confessed to Jane and she ordered Clare to "Stay away from Ian!". According to Bissix, filming these scenes was particularly hard for Adam Woodyatt, who knew her well when she was only a child from her first stint in the soap: "Poor Adam. He spent a day staring at my chest for one scene, trying to get the fact that the last time he saw me I was 14 out of his head. He was a friend of Nigel so he was around all the time when I was first here and we'd done scenes together. Now, instead of this snotty-nosed little girl making Nigel's tea, she was trying to seduce him and get him in his Y-fronts."

Clare was later shown to develop an interest in Bradley Branning (Charlie Clements). In an interview with Digital Spy at the 2008 British Soap Awards, Bissix was asked about Clare's relationship with Bradley. She said, "[Their relationship] will be explored to a certain degree, but at the same time [...] it is Bradley at the end of the day, and unless he earns money, it's not going to get very far."

Other characters that Clare has tried to seduce for their wealth have included Bradley's father Max (Jake Wood), and her former sugar daddy, Arnold (Richard Lumsden) — a guest character who was introduced in a storyline that saw Clare steal all his wife's expensive jewellery. In May 2008, Bissix revealed that the "depths to Clare are going to start to be unraveled", which she welcomed as, in her words, she'd had "enough of [Clare's] maneating for a while."

=== Departure (2008) ===
Despite Bissix stating early in May 2008 that she was going to be with EastEnders for "a while", it was announced a few weeks later on 23 May 2008 that she would be leaving EastEnders when her contract ended in the summer of 2008. Bissix has since revealed that she decided not to renew her contract. Bissix commented, "I've had a great time at EastEnders and I have loved having the chance to play Clare again. I'm looking forward to trying new things." Press reports suggested that Clare would depart the soap after she was exposed as a "thoroughly nasty piece of work". A source told the press, "Clare has been toiling away, trying it on with all the affluent men of Walford including Bradley Branning, Jack Branning and even Ian Beale but what she had thought was a masterplan to bag the man of her dreams soon gets out of hand. She is forced to flee as it is clear she is not welcome in Albert Square anymore."

Despite Clare showing a more "vulnerable" side in the weeks prior to her departure, in episodes that aired in July 2008, Bradley discovered her original plan to manipulate money from himself and other men in Walford, and subsequently shunned her, leaving Clare "feeling isolated and unwanted by her closest friends and family". Bissix has discussed her character's departure and the "softer side" to Clare that emerged: "she does genuinely care for [Bradley] [...] When he turns against her, it turns into a bit of a drunken mission for her and she wrecks Dot's house. When Dot comes back, she finds her in a bit of a state and hands her a Christianity leaflet. [Clare] actually sits and tries to pray". Kris Green from Digital Spy has suggested that the programme "only really ever scratched the surface with [Clare]" and that there was still a lot that was undiscovered about the character, which Bissix has agreed with. She comments, "This isn't a closed chapter. At the end of the day, she's been outed off the Square and with the character she is, she doesn't even know what's going on in her own head. Someone like Clare doesn't stick around Walford unless there's a reason. I like to believe in what I do and believe in my characters. I'm not going to stay in a job for no reason. Clare would definitely leave in this situation." After one last "huge row" with Bradley and realising that she had no friends in Walford, Clare decided to leave, making her exit in an hour-long episode that aired on 7 August 2008. Discussing her exit, Bissix said, "I leave Albert Square in the back of a Black Cab, of course! Which is how I left with Nigel 10 years ago so it feels kind of right. It's better than going out in a [coffin] isn't it? I don't want to be killed off!" She also revealed that she is hoping Clare Bates will return to EastEnders again one day, commenting, "I don't think it's the end of Clare. I'm sure she'll be back to cause trouble at some point." In 2009, Bissix added that producers told her when she left in August 2008 that they were thinking of bringing her character back in a year or so. She added, "but it's one of those things. I'll just have to wait and see."

=== Return (2026) ===
Having originally appeared between 1993 and 1998 and again in 2008, and despite Bissix ruling out a return to the programme in May 2025, Bissix said: "No, they didn't ask me. I think they did fantastic with their 40th birthday celebrations", adding: "And you know, realistically, had that sort of that had come on the cards, that storyline would have probably been, you know, Clare Bates going and taking his money from a dementia sufferer character, which actually probably isn't something I would want to do either". In February 2026, it was announced that Bissix would be reprising the role of Clare for a short stint later that year, as part of Nigel's ongoing dementia storyline. Speaking on her return, Bissix said "It was a real pleasure to be asked to reprise the role of Clare for Nigel's storyline. I was hoping to get the call as I think the fans wanted EastEnders to revisit their relationship. Nigel and Clare were a formidable pairing in the 90s with a very unique stepfather/stepdaughter relationship! It has been so great to reconnect with Paul and Karen after all these years, and it's crazy how time felt like it had stopped when we did! I grew up on the set of EastEnders and essentially learnt my craft there, so it's been a real full circle moment! Whilst it will be an emotional reunion, I hope the viewers will be pleased to see Clare and Nigel on screen together once again!".

== Storylines ==
=== 1993–1998 ===
Clare, the daughter of Debbie Tyler (Nicola Duffett), arrives in Walford in 1993 when her mother moves in with her new partner Nigel Bates (Paul Bradley). Her father, Liam (Francis Magee) was abusive towards Debbie, which led to them separating. Liam follows them to Walford and tries everything possible to break Nigel and Debbie up. Debbie eventually marries Nigel a year later and Clare is happy with them; however, her happiness is cut short when Debbie dies in a hit-and-run accident in 1995. Nigel falls apart and Clare has to look after him but Nigel sorts himself out when Liam returns, wanting custody of Clare but Clare is happy and does not want to leave her stepfather. Nigel fights Liam for Clare and wins after Liam is forced to withdraw his case as his girlfriend, Caroline Webber (Franesca Hall) admits his abusive behavior in court.

Clare is friendly with the other young girls in Walford, Janine Butcher (Alexia Demetriou) and Sonia Jackson (Natalie Cassidy). They cause trouble for the barber Felix Kawalski (Harry Landis) in November 1995, when they spread rumours that he is a pervert who has murdered his wife, and keeps her mutilated body in his cellar. Clare breaks into Felix's barber shop one evening to find the body but she trips on the cellar stairs and is knocked unconscious. The adults of Walford fear Clare has been abducted by Felix; they confront him, but find Clare safe and well. Felix has only been hiding a collection of butterflies.

In 1997, Clare starts socialising with a bad crowd at school, and subsequently begins bullying Sonia, leading to her being reprimanded by her teacher, Julie Haye (Karen Henthorn). Nigel takes her to his old school to show her the pain that bullies inflict on their victims, making her see sense so she makes peace with Sonia. She then falls for a boy at her school, Josh Saunders (Jon Lee), who rescues Clare from her old gang after they turn on her for leaving their clique. They start dating — despite Nigel's objections — though their romance hits a brief setback when Clare discovers that his mother is also her teacher, Julie. Despite her initial upset, Clare comes round and she is happy when Nigel and Julie begin dating. When Julie gets a job in Scotland, Nigel and Clare decide to join her and Josh, leaving Walford in April 1998.

=== 2008–2026 ===
On 1 February 2008, Clare returns to Albert Square; she is thrown from the back seat of a car. Nigel's former landlady, Dot Branning (June Brown), persuades her to stay. Clare moves in with Dot and gets a job as receptionist at Tanya Branning's (Jo Joyner) beauty parlour. Preferring rich men, Clare tries to attract the attention of the wealthy men in Albert Square. Jack Branning (Scott Maslen) and his brother Max (Jake Wood) show no interest; however, Ian Beale (Adam Woodyatt) is more susceptible, despite being married to Jane Beale (Laurie Brett). Clare flirts with Ian, wears revealing clothes and talks suggestively but she is playing a game and has no intention of taking things further, acting shocked when Ian suggests that she does. She blackmails Ian, threatening to inform Jane of his dishonourable intentions unless he pays to keep quiet but Ian tells Jane himself so she confronts Clare, warning her to stay away from Ian.

Clare becomes interested in Bradley Branning (Charlie Clements) when he gets a lucrative property development job. They grow closer and she attempts to seduce him but he rebuffs her advances, due to recently separating from his wife, Stacey (Lacey Turner), but relents when Clare dresses up as Princess Leia to impress him. He propositions her but Clare refuses to have sex with him, breaking down and telling him about an affair she had with an aggressive, married man named Arnold. Arnold traces Clare to Walford, wanting to rekindle their affair but Clare only wanted Arnold to buy her expensive gifts and when he stopped, she fled. Clare knows that Arnold had bought his wife expensive jewellery and persuades Bradley to help her steal it by claiming that it belongs to her. Believing Arnold is a bully, Bradley agrees. The robbery goes off without a hitch, but Arnold sees Clare leaving and returns to Walford to confront her. Clare admits that she never loved Arnold and was only using him for his money. When he threatens to call the police, Clare threatens to ruin his marriage and Bradley throws him out after Clare lies that he was verbally abusing her. Satisfied with her pay off, Clare realises that Bradley is too good for her and tells him this, refusing to start a relationship, but is jealous, however, when Bradley reconciles with Stacey.

Despite starting as enemies, Clare becomes friends with her colleague, Chelsea Fox (Tiana Benjamin) and they regularly go out together, looking for wealthy men. When Chelsea starts using drugs, her behaviour becomes erratic and she steals £100 from Tanya. Sensing an opportunity to make money, Clare also steals £100 and blames the theft on Chelsea, who is fired from her job. Subsequently, Clare and Chelsea's friendship ends.

Revealing a more vulnerable side, Clare becomes morose and upset on the anniversary of her mother's death, telling Dot that she feels alone and can only rely upon herself. The following month, she is devastated when Nigel fails to visit. She breaks down in tears, telling Bradley that she and Nigel had grown apart as she had aged. Later, she tells Garry Hobbs (Ricky Groves) that Nigel was unsupportive when she slept with a boy at school and got a reputation for being promiscuous, simply putting her on the contraceptive pill. Bradley's support helps Clare realise she has to change and vows to put her gold digging behind her but Bradley finds her diary that shows her plan to take his money. He subsequently turns against her so Clare throws a party at Dot's house, inviting random people who trash the place. Dot, realising Clare is depressed, tries to get her to seek counsel from God. Clare reacts with fury, but following advice from Lucas Johnson (Don Gilet), she tries to make amends with Dot and even attempts to pray but Bradley is not convinced and insists Clare leave Walford. Clare does, leaving behind a goodbye letter for Dot and stealing £200 from Bradley, leaving in a black taxi on 7 August 2008.

When Nigel returns to Walford in December 2024, he reveals he has been diagnosed with early onset dementia, and has lost contact with Clare. When Sam Mitchell (Kim Medcalf) returns in December 2025, she takes advantage of Nigel's condition by pretending to be Clare to defraud him of his money. Sam's deception is swiftly uncovered by Phil Mitchell (Steve McFadden) and Julie, who punches Sam in the face. When Nigel is moved into a care home as his condition worsens, Julie calls Clare, who arrives to visit Nigel. It is revealed Clare became estranged from Nigel after she pawned Debbie's wedding ring. Clare is upset by Nigel's deteriorating condition, and leaves when he hits her in a moment of confusion. Nigel dies from pneumonia in April 2026, and Clare returns with Josh for his funeral the following month. Clare helps Julie write her eulogy, and after laying Nigel to rest, she leaves again.

== Reception ==
Bissix was nominated in the "Best Bitch" category at the Inside Soap Awards in 2008 for her role as Clare.

The character's return in 2008, where Clare was thrown out of a car's rear door into the gutter, was called a "sensational entrance" by Daily Mirror critic Tony Stewart, who also cried it "yet another reason to watch Enders again"; he speculated that she would be "compulsive viewing", suggesting that there was "an air of desperate mystery" about her and added that the "sweet teenage schoolgirl has grown up to be a self-possessed and manipulative stunner who'll give the Mitchell sisters a run for their money. If Clare's just had a bumpy ride, then Walford should buckle up as she's about to return the favour!".

According to a May 2008 article by Martin Smith, television critic for the Coventry Telegraph, the character of Clare Bates is one of only two reasons to watch EastEnders. He commented, "She's sassy, stylish, sexy and supremely manipulative – and far foxier than either of the Mitchell [sisters]." Though he continued that the character had been underused, saying "Unfortunately, for 'Enders, she's sidelined more often than Harry Kewell in a Champions League final. At least Hollyoaks knew her worth."

Clare dressed as Princess Leia (2008)

The character's "scantily clad" attire has been commented on in the British tabloid press, with Tony Stewart from the Daily Mirror suggesting that Gemma Bissix might "turn up in Albert Square starkers next". In May 2008, Clare was shown dressed as Princess Leia, and according to Stewart she looked like "a porno version" of the Star Wars character, "in white hot pants and a skimpy top that [allowed] her galactic orbs to bounce about".

It has also been noted that the 2008 "minx" version of Clare Bates is similar to the character Clare Devine from the Channel 4 soap Hollyoaks, whom Bissix played during a break from EastEnders between 2006 and 2007. Despite them being entirely different characters, it was suggested in The Herald that Bissix actually reprised the role between the two soaps. Bissix has acknowledged the comparison between the two characters, but maintains that they differ: "A lot of people ask me this. Clare Bates is a minx and dresses to impress, using her sexuality to get where she wanted [...] Clare Devine doesn't have the emotion Clare Bates does. Clare Devine kills people, she tells little children that they're the reason for their parents' death!"

In reference to the character's brief dalliance with Christianity in 2008, TV critic for Heat magazine, Julie Emery commented, "Stop right now, EastEnders. Please do not even try to make us believe that tarty, conniving Clare is about to find God, start wearing sensible floral frocks and run off to be a missionary in Africa [...] we ain't buying Clare realising the error of her ways and turning into a Bible basher. Anyway, we like her nasty bad-girl ways."
