= Karen Henthorn =

English actress (born 1963)

- Born: 14 February 1963 (age 63); Oldham, Lancashire, England
- Occupation: Actress
- Years active: 1976–present

Karen Henthorn (born 14 February 1963) is an English actress, known for portraying the role of Julie Bates in BBC soap opera EastEnders from 1997 to 1998 and 2025 to 2026, as well as Teresa Bryant in the ITV soap opera Coronation Street between 2007 and 2010. Henthorn's other roles include various appearances in Doctors, Casualty and Holby City, as well as stage productions including War Horse, A Midsummer Night's Dream and Much Ado About Nothing.

== Early life ==
Henthorn was born on 14 February 1963 in Oldham, Lancashire to Pamela (née Stott) and Peter Henthorn. She has an older brother, Stephen. She began to develop an interest in acting aged 12, and subsequently joined the Oldham Theatre workshop, before being cast in her first professional role the following year, portraying Betty Parris in a theatre production of The Crucible. She then went on to study a two-year foundation course in Theatre Studies at her local college, before embarking on a three year course at Drama Centre London.

== Career ==
After beginning her career in theatre, Henthorn's early television roles included appearances in Children's Ward and Boon in 1989. She made her film debut in 1993 as a young mother in Raining Stones. In 1997, Henthorn joined the cast of the BBC soap opera EastEnders as Julie Haye, a school teacher of Clare Bates (Gemma Bissix). She later becomes a love interest for Clare's father Nigel Bates (Paul Bradley) and the pair begin a relationship, ultimately departing in April 1998 after Julie accepts a job in Scotland and Nigel decides to leave alongside her. Henthorn's other roles included parts in series such as The Booze Cruise, in which she played Cath Bolton, as well as several episodes of Doctors, Casualty, Heartbeat and Holby City. She also played Marissa Platting, a social worker in the television series Shameless.

In 2007, Henthorn joined the ITV soap opera Coronation Street as Teresa Bryant. Initially appearing for several episodes, she returned a year later on a permanent contract with the character's storylines including her ex-husband Jerry Morton (Michael Starke)'s heart attack, a complicated relationship with her children, and her relationship with Lloyd Mullaney (Craig Charles). The majority of Teresa's on-screen family the Mortons were axed in 2008, however she remained on the show until making her final appearance in May 2010.

In 2011, she appeared on Sky One's comedy series Trollied. The same year, she played a school inspector in the CBBC series Young Dracula. Between 2013 and 2014, she played Janet Macy on the BBC Three series In the Flesh. Henthorn is also a teacher, having taught screen acting on the BA (Hons) Acting course at Italia Conti Academy in Clapham and at the Manchester School of Theatre. Between 2013, she appeared in the touring National Theatre production of War Horse. Henthorn's other stage credits include Ockerbys on Ice, Shirley, Spring and Port Wine, The Newspaper Boy, Tinned Up, A Midsummer Night's Dream, Much Ado About Nothing and Blithe Spirit.

In 2022, she starred as DI Sowerby in the Channel 5 programme The Teacher alongside Sheridan Smith and Kelvin Fletcher. The following year, she appeared in an episode of the ITV drama Vera as Jill Falstone; in the first episode of Channel 5's The Good Ship Murder as Maureen Weaver; and in the second series of BBC One prison drama Time. In 2024, she appeared as Emily in the BBC One drama The Listeners.

After making a voice appearance earlier in the year, in June 2025, it was announced that Henthorn would return to EastEnders as Julie Bates, after 27 years away from the role, as part of the character's on screen husband Nigel's dementia storyline. She returned the following month, and departed in May 2026 following Nigel's death. Julie proved popular with the soap's viewers during her return, with many commending Henthorn's portrayal of the character and were disappointed to see her depart. Henthorn also appeared in the Amazon Prime Video series The Girlfriend, as well as an episode of The Jury: Murder Trial. Following her departure from EastEnders, she went on to appear in the dark comedy play Mothers and Daughters at the Edge Theatre, Manchester.

== Personal life ==
Henthorn was diagnosed with basal cell carcinoma, a form of skin cancer in 2011, and ultimately beat the disease. She went on to support a fundraising campaign for Stand Up To Cancer and had two further cancerous lumps removed, one from her chest and another from her right arm.

== Filmography ==
Year	Title	Role	Notes	Ref.
1989	Boon	Female Student	1 episode	
1989	Children's Ward	Casualty Nurse	1 episode	
1990	Casualty	Sandra	Episode: "Close to Home"	
1993	Raining Stones	Young Mother	Film role	
1995	The Bill	Melanie Cross	Episode: "Presumed Guilty"	
1997	Dalziel and Pascoe	Sturgeon's Nurse	Episode: "Ruling Passion"	
1997–1998, 2025–2026	EastEnders	Julie Bates	Regular role	
1999	Silent Witness	Anne-Marie Williams	2 episodes	
1999	Stanton Blues	Geri Green	2 episodes	
2000	My Hero	Jason's Mum	1 episode	
2000	Holby City	Jeanette Cunningham	Episode: "Into the Woods"	
2000	Doctors	Amanda Kenworth	Episode: "Coming and Going"	
2003	The Booze Cruise	Cath Bolton	Television film	
2003	Sons & Lovers	Librarian	Television film	
2003	The Bill	Bridget Thomas	Episode: "Bad Taste"	
2004	Born and Bred	Ivy	2 episodes	
2004	Doctors	Sheila Seagrove	Episode: "The Birds and the Bees"	
2004	Heartbeat	Glad Dibley	Episode: "Mountains and Molehills"	
2004	Casualty	Helen Bradshaw	Episode: "World Gone Wild: Part 2"	
2005	The Booze Cruise II: The Treasure Hunt	Cath Bolton	Television film	
2005	Shameless	Marissa Platting	1 episode	
2006	The Booze Cruise III: The Scattering	Cath Bolton	Television film	
2006	No Angels	Craft Leader	2 episodes	
2006	Pulling	Eileen	1 episode	
2006	Dalziel and Pascoe	Pathologist	2 episodes	
2007	The Bill	Judith Wilkes	Episode: "The New Generation"	
2007	Holby City	Susan Hobson	Episode: "Leap of Faith"	
2007	Heartbeat	Mary Younger	Episode: "The Medium Is the Message"	
2007–2010	Coronation Street	Teresa Bryant	Regular role	
2008	Doctors	Doreen Fletcher	Episode: "No. 786"	
2009	Pussyfooting	Trudy	Short film	
2009	The Street	Headmistress	1 episode	
2011	Casualty	Helen Leigh	2 episodes	
2011	Trollied	Michelle	1 episode	
2011	Young Dracula	Mrs. Cotton	1 episode	
2012	White Heat	Val	Television mini-series; 3 episodes	
2012	Homefront	Maria	1 episode	
2012	Doctors	Paula Salisbury	Episode: "Life's Too Short"	
2013	In the Flesh	Janet Macy	3 episodes	
2015	Doctors	Ruth Price	Episode: "Busted"	
2018	Dark Heart	Theresa Ryan / Theresa Clarke	2 episodes	
2018	Thick As Steves	Auntie Jean	Television film	
2018	Doctors	Bea Donalds	Episode: "Shame"	
2020	The Trouble with Maggie Cole	Jenny Myer	4 episodes	
2021	Viewpoint	Janice Baines	Television mini-series; 5 episodes	
2022	The Teacher	DI Sowerby	2 episodes	
2022	Royal Shakespeare Company: Much Ado About Nothing	Dogberry	Television film	
2022	The Rising	Joan Connolly	5 episodes	
2023	Vera	Jill Falstone	1 episode	
2023	The Good Ship Murder	Maureen Weaver	1 episode	
2023	Time	Elizabeth O'Riordan	2 episodes	
2024	Passenger	Cath Benjamin-Dale	3 episodes	
2024	The Listeners	Emily	3 episodes	
2025	The Jury: Murder Trial	Mary Crossford	Television mini-series; 1 episode	
2025	Selby Love	Mrs. Blenkin	Short film	
2025	The Girlfriend	Tracey Laine	Television mini-series; 6 episodes	
2025	Fackham Hall	Sister Jude	Film role	
2025	Ellipsis	Alison	Short film	
2025	Jackie Is Lost	Jackie	Short film	

== Stage ==
Year	Title	Role	Ref.
1976	The Crucible	Betty Parris	
—N/a	Zack	Sally Teale	
—N/a	Edward II	Lady Margaret De Claire	
—N/a	The Snow Queen	Gerda	
—N/a	Wuthering Heights	Cathy	
—N/a	The Idiot	Aglaya	
—N/a	The Caucasian Chalk Circle	Grusha	
—N/a	A Taste of Honey	Sally Teale	
—N/a	Not Gods But Giants	Shirley Ryan	
—N/a	Bintou	P'tit Jean's Mother	
—N/a	The Crucible	Abigail Williams	
1989	A Chorus of Disapproval	Linda Washbrook	
1992	Straight and Narrow	Lois	
2002	The Accrington Pals	Annie Boggis	
2013–2014	War Horse	Rose Narracott	
2015	Ockerbys on Ice	Viv Ockerby	
2017	Shirley	Audrey	
2017	Spring and Port Wine	Daisy Crompton	
2018	The Newspaper Boy	Nana Jean	
2019	Tinned Up	Shirley Parkin	
2021	A Midsummer Night's Dream	Bottom	
2022	Much Ado About Nothing	Dogberry	
2025	Blithe Spirit	Madame Arcarti	
2026	Mothers and Daughters	Gill	
