= The Booze Cruise =

- Directed by: Paul Seed
- Written by: Paul Minett and Brian Leveson
- Produced by: Roy Gould
- Starring: Brian Murphy; Mark Benton; Neil Pearson; Karen Henthorn; Claire Skinner; Amanda Abbington; Anne Reid
- Edited by: Dave King
- Music by: Jim Parker
- Release dates: 2003; 2005; 2006
- Country: United Kingdom
- Language: English

The Booze Cruise is a series of three feature-length comedy dramas produced by Yorkshire Television and written for British television by Paul Minett and Brian Leveson. The first episode in the series premiered on ITV in 2003.

Two follow-up episodes were also created by Minett and Leveson, featuring the same characters, with the exception of Clive, who did not appear in either sequel owing to Martin Clunes' Doc Martin commitments. Daniel was now played by Tom Bennett, and only appears in The Booze Cruise II, while Amanda Abbington took on the role of Leone.

== Episodes ==
=== "The Booze Cruise" (2003) ===
A group of men from Kent – Clive (Martin Clunes), Rob (Neil Pearson), Dave (Mark Benton), Maurice (Brian Murphy) and Daniel (Ben Whishaw) – go on a "booze cruise" to France. Maurice and Rob are neighbours, and bitter enemies. They reluctantly travel together in the group, and they all eventually board the car ferry to France. When in France, Maurice and Clive want to stop off at a war museum, before they get to the main supermarket.

Whilst the others shop, Daniel is sent to get petrol for their car, but accidentally knocks down a woman cyclist, Juliette (Elsa Kikoïne), with the car. Daniel goes with Juliette to the hospital, waits for her there, and drives her back home once she is bandaged up. The pair get on very well, and bond over their extensive knowledge of films. Daniel decides to stay with Juliette, whilst the other men return home. En route, their trailer of alcohol catches fire, most of the champagne corks pop, and the trailer is ruined.

Events involving their wives and families back home also form a large part of the plot. Clive's wife Ruth is enthusiastically planning a lavish wedding for her daughter Chloe (Louise Callaghan) and Daniel. Later on, Dave's wife Cath (Karen Henthorn) tries to console Ruth, after she finds out that her husband's business has gone bankrupt, and then finds Chloe in bed with the wedding photographer, Dominic (Jalaal Hartley). Meanwhile, Maurice's wife Grace (Anne Reid) and Leone (Claire Skinner) reconcile over their garden fence, and end up really enjoying each other's company, in the absence of their husbands. After they have lunch, and get drunk on wine, Grace tries to cut down the overgrown trees in her garden. This goes wrong, as one of the trees falls on, and destroys, Rob's beloved shed... So Maurice returns home to find his wife drunk and his beloved trees chopped up on the front drive, whilst Rob discovers that his shed has vanished!

=== "The Booze Cruise II: The Treasure Hunt" (2005) ===
This episode sees the return of many of the characters, as they go on a treasure hunt. Businessman Marcus (Ian Richardson), who will potentially offer a contract to Dave's company, first appears in this episode. Rob, Dave, Cath, Leone, Daniel, and Marcus form a team called the "Booze Cruisers". Although Maurice, Grace, and her mother Elsie (Irene Sutcliffe) do very well following the clues in their camper van, the Booze Cruisers do very poorly under Rob's leadership, as they go to several wrong locations when following the clues. Grace then thinks her Mum has died in the camper van, and after going to the hospital, two thieves drive off with the van, before running off once they find Elsie in there. Elsie recuperates, and drives "all over the M11", before being rescued and taken home.

Both parties then come together at a hotel, and form one group. Dave, Rob and Daniel go back that night to look for missing treasure in the woods, but get lost. Meanwhile, the women have a great time singing at a karaoke session in the hotel. The next day, the group get very behind schedule with a flat car tyre, but Dave, Rob, Marcus and Maurice still go to the beach look for the last treasure item. However, a dog had picked up and moved the stick that marked their treasure spot, so Dave, Rob, and Maurice dig a massive hole in the wrong place. The tide then comes in, so the four men end up stranded on the top of the camper van in the middle of the sea! The treasure hunt is a disaster, as the Booze Cruisers come last. Rob is also discovered to be having an affair, and Leone shuts him out of their house when they get home.

Meanwhile, Chloe is now pregnant, and has organised a massive party at her house. Daniel keeps phoning to check up on her, but she keeps trying to put him off from being involved. Dominic, the wedding photographer she slept with in the last episode, also turns up at the party. Chloe then goes into labour during the party, and later gives birth to a baby boy at the hospital. Daniel returns to visit them both at the hospital, and Chloe announces that she would like to call her baby "Timberlake".

=== "The Booze Cruise III: The Scattering" (2006) ===
The characters go to Yorkshire to scatter the ashes of Grace's mother, Elsie, on the Moors. After looking at a photo album at Maurice and Grace's house after the funeral, Leone, Cath, and Dave also plan to surprise the couple with a meal at a Yorkshire hotel, to celebrate what they think is their Ruby Wedding Anniversary. Marcus visits Dave at his company, and asks him to transport a parcel for his brother-in-law. Maurice, Grace, Dave, Cath, Leone and Rob meet up the next day, but Jackie (Suzy Cooper), the woman Rob had an affair with, also unexpectedly turns up for the trip. This causes a lot of tension in the car.

After the car gets stuck in a muddy ditch, Rob, Dave and Maurice go to get help, and find an old car garage with two mechanics. After the car is towed to their garage, some of the group are shown a greenhouse with "late flowering geraniums" (marijuana). The car parts aren't available, so the women drive one of the mechanics' cars. The men are taken to a "car hire" venue, which has become an air field. Maurice then trips over a rock, drops the urn, and Elsie's ashes spill out over the ground. Before they have time to scoop them up, a plane lands in the air field, and blows most of the ashes away. Whilst Maurice is asleep, Rob spikes Maurice's pipe with marijuana he obtained from the greenhouse. By the time they arrive at a pub, Maurice is high from the drug. He starts laughing and joking, before knocking over his beer, which spills all over Elsie's urn and soaks the ashes! Meanwhile, the women's car breaks down, but with help from Jackie, they manage to hitch a ride with Ben, a good-looking man from Canada. Both parties arrive at their hotel, and at the evening meal, Rob gets very jealous watching Ben and Leone getting on so well. Jackie realises that Rob still loves Leone, and leaves that night.

The next day, Dave and Rob drop off Marcus' parcel. Marcus insults Dave, and Dave discovers that Marcus' reasons for the gift are corrupt, so Dave ends his working relationship with him. The original group then goes off to scatter Elsie's ashes. Maurice has to dress up in Elsie's clothes, and say "God bless her" every time someone says her name! They all climb 3 miles to the top of Ilkley Moor, Cow & Calf parking area. After a short, informal ceremony, Maurice releases the ashes (attached to balloons) into the air. At her mother's request, Grace then unexpectedly gets out a shotgun, and shoots the urn down from the sky! Rob and Leone reconcile on this journey, and come down the hill holding hands.

== Reception ==
The three episodes have received mixed critical reviews, with the Radio Times describing it as "like comedy in 1973" and also "you can see each joke a mile off", but generally liking the show.

The Booze Cruise III won the Royal Television Society Award North for Best Network Drama.

== Partial cast ==
- Mark Benton – Dave Bolton
- Brian Murphy – Maurice Stringer
- Neil Pearson – Rob Sewell
- Karen Henthorn - Cath Bolton
- Anne Reid – Grace Stringer
- Claire Skinner – Leone Sewell (The Booze Cruise)
- Amanda Abbington – Leone Sewell (The Booze Cruise II and III)
- Ian Richardson – Marcus Foster
- Martin Clunes – Clive Rainer
- Marsha Fitzalan – Ruth Rainer
- Louise Callaghan – Chloe Rainer
- Ben Whishaw – Daniel (The Booze Cruise)
- Tom Bennett – Daniel (The Booze Cruise II)
- Elsa Kikoïne – Juliette
- Jalaal Hartley – Dominic
- Suzy Cooper – Jackie
