= Nigel Bates =

Fictional character from EastEnders

- EastEnders character
- Paul Bradley as Nigel Bates (2025)
- Portrayed by: Paul Bradley; Sam Miles (2025; flashback); Edward Gilchrist (2026; flashback)
- Duration: 1992–1998, 2024–2026
- First appearance: Episode 742; 17 March 1992
- Last appearance: Episode 7322; 30 April 2026
- Introduced by: Leonard Lewis (1992); Chris Clenshaw (2024)
In-universe information
- Occupation: Shopkeeper; Cashier
- Wife: Debbie Tyler (1994–1995); Julie Haye (2000–2026)
- Adoptive daughters: Clare Bates
- Stepsons: Josh Saunders
- Granddaughters: Bella (adoptive)

Nigel Bates is a fictional character from the British BBC soap opera EastEnders, played by Paul Bradley. Introduced in 1992 by Leonard Lewis, the character was incorporated gradually and brought back as a regular following a brief stint due to a popular reception. He is depicted as a "lovable loser" and a "nerd". Bradley quit the role and Nigel was written out of the serial in April 1998 and was given a happy ending. The door was left open for a possible future return and the character made an unannounced return on 24 December 2024. Sam Miles portrayed a younger Nigel in Phil Mitchell's (Steve McFadden) teenage flashbacks in 2025. Following a high-profile dementia storyline, Nigel was killed off on 29 April 2026 before later making his final appearance as a corpse on 30 April 2026, with Bradley departing the soap. In the character's penultimate episode, a younger Nigel was portrayed briefly by Edward Gilchrist. Nigel's funeral aired on 20 May 2026.

== Creation and development ==
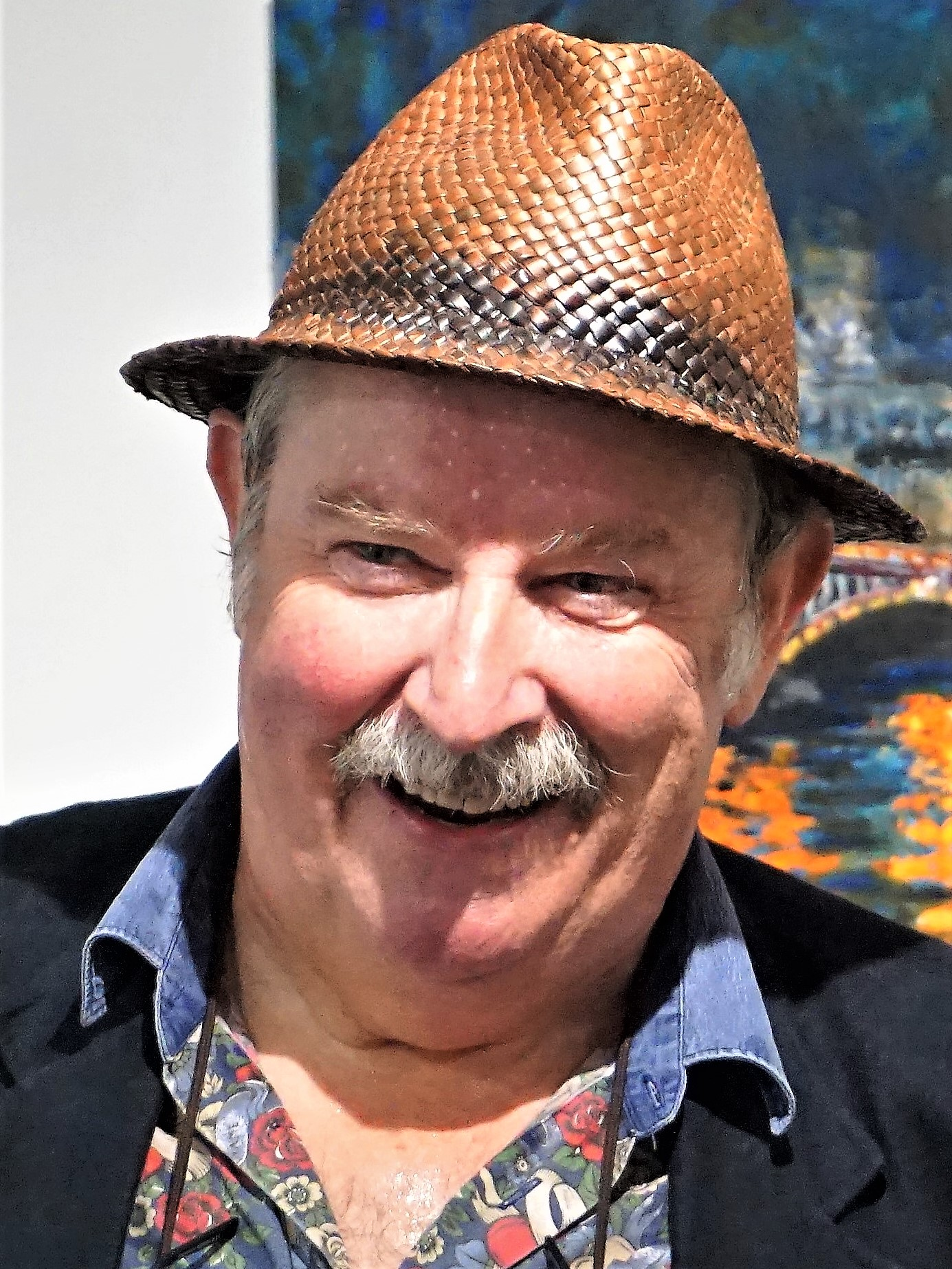
Actor Paul Bradley (pictured) was initially only contracted for three episodes.

Nigel was one of several introductions occurring in 1992. Executive producer Leonard Lewis took a tentative approach to introducing new characters in 1992. Most were introduced gradually, making an initial appearance and then joining the programme full-time a couple of months later. This allowed the producers and writers to create new characters and see them brought to life by the actors before committing them to a longer contract. Characters introduced in this way included Mandy Salter (Nicola Stapleton), Christine Hewitt (Lizzie Power), and Nigel Bates, played by Paul Bradley.

Nigel first appears in March 1992 as a friend of established characters Grant (Ross Kemp) and Phil Mitchell (Steve McFadden), when he comes to Walford and he does some bits of business with Phil and Grant and he buys Frank Butcher's (Mike Reid) Mercedes. After a successful first appearance, Nigel moves to the soap's setting permanently later in the year following the death of his mother and he gradually becomes more of a comedy character and light hearted and he becomes the lodger of Dot Cotton (June Brown).

Paul Bradley has discussed his casting in Larry Jaffee's book, Albert Square & Me: The Actors of Eastenders, conducted in 1994: "I was only supposed to do three episodes and I think they just liked the character. Nigel is kind of light and funny and arrived just after Gill [Fowler] (Susanna Dawson) had died of AIDS and the show was accused of being a bit gloomy. I came back for one more episode and then I've been back ever since."

Bradley has described Nigel as "harmless and amiable ... I suppose he's a bit of a wallie. Nigel is very well-meaning. He was best mates at school with Phil and Grant. Where they would use their fists, he would use jokes to get out of trouble." Author Kate Lock has described him as "a lovely, lovely man with two flaws: his inability to say 'no' to a fry-up and his faith in Grant Mitchell." Lock suggested that Nigel and Grant were diametrically opposed personalities. Lock added, "Nigel was overweight, shy, had the world's worst taste in shirts and ties and sported a mop of shaggy curls reminiscent of 70s footballers, so it wasn't often he found success with the opposite sex, although women were drawn to his gentleness and humour more than he realised." Author Rupert Smith classified Nigel as a "soft touch" character, the type of characters who were "permenently [sic?] confused, sexually bungling men [...] These poor souls exist to be trampled, disappointed and taken for a ride by any crook or schemer that crosses their path."

In 1993, two characters central to Nigel's narrative are introduced: a love interest, Debbie Tyler, (Nicola Duffett), and her daughter, Clare (Gemma Bissix). Their introduction stems from a storyline focusing on spousal abuse, when it is revealed that Debbie is being abused by her estranged husband, Liam Tyler (Francis Magee). Nigel and Debbie's eventual marriage is the focus of EastEnders' celebratory episode on 12 July 1994, which marked the show's 1000th episode. EastEnders' writer Colin Brake has selected it as 1994's episode of the year. Off-screen the show's series producer, Barbara Emile, decided to mark the 1,000th episode with a celebration, and the wedding of Nigel and Debbie was chosen as the event. It was scripted to be a happy occasion in the soap, with Debbie and Nigel's ceremony going ahead despite threats of intrusion from Liam. The Bateses happiness was short-lived on-screen, as in 1995, Debbie's actress, Nicola Duffet, requested to be written out of the soap; Debbie was killed off in the serial leaving Nigel a grieving widower, fighting for custody of his step-daughter, Clare.

In December 1996, it was announced that Bradley had decided to quit EastEnders for fear of being typecast as a nerd and "lovable loser". He was the third senior cast member to quit in the space of two months, following the announced departures of Jacqueline Leonard and Paul Nicholls who played Lorraine and Joe Wicks. Bradley said: "I have made a decision about leaving EastEnders and I have told the BBC about it. I know it is regular work and you are in the public eye, but it is time to move on. Much as I love playing Nigel, I would not like people to think that was all I did. I did a lot of work before EastEnders and I will after. I don't want to be like some people who've been in [ITV soap opera] Coronation Street for 20 years – I'm much too restless." A BBC insider commented: "It's a real blow that Paul wants to go, but we hope that he doesn't close the door altogether. It's very worrying that so much of the top talent is wanting out of Albert Square."

The character remains on-screen until April 1998 and was given a "happy ending", leaving to begin a new life with a newfound love, Julie Haye (Karen Henthorn), allowing for a future return. Henthorn has suggested that because Nigel was "such a popular character", and because he had such an unsuccessful love life throughout the course of the show, the producers of EastEnders felt that the viewing public would not want him to have anything other than a "happy ending".

== Storylines ==
=== 1992–1998 ===
Nigel Bates attended school with the Mitchell Brothers Phil (Steve McFadden) and Grant (Ross Kemp), becoming their closest friend as time went on; soon enough Nigel began frequenting the Mitchells' home in Walford, before finally moving there himself following the death of his mother. He lodges with local resident Dot Cotton (June Brown) and is known in the community for his extravagant shirts and ties, and his mop of shaggy curly hair. Dot comes to think of Nigel as the son she never had because he is the complete opposite of her own son, Nick (John Altman). This causes trouble between Nigel and Nick when Nick bullies Nigel, jealous of Dot's friendship with him.

As time goes on, Nigel's friendship with the Mitchell Brothers remains so strong that he often tries to play peacemaking between Phil and Grant whenever the two siblings fall out with each other. This is most prominent in October 1994 on the night Nigel and the others are celebrating Phil's engagement with café owner Kathy Beale (Gillian Taylforth), but instead Grant ruins it by playing a tape in public that reveals his wife Sharon Mitchell (Letitia Dean) had an affair with Phil for over two years. Grant later attacks Phil and hospitalises him in a fit of grief and rage, but Nigel eventually manages to help the Mitchell Brothers reconcile with each other.

It is then Nigel falls in love with his employee, Debbie Tyler (Nicola Duffett), and the two soon get engaged. But then the couple are startled when Debbie's estranged abusive husband, Tyler (Francis Magee), arrives in the square to reunite with Debbie and visit their daughter Clare (Gemma Bissix) after tracking them down. He reacts with fury when he realises Nigel is seeing Debbie, and begins hassling both in an attempt to split them up. Eventually, Liam is frightened away by Grant after Nigel enlists his help. Nigel and Debbie eventually marry and are happy until Debbie is killed in a hit-and-run accident. Nigel is devastated by her death. Liam returns and fights Nigel for custody of Clare, but is unsuccessful because of his history of violent behaviour towards Debbie and other women; Liam's new girlfriend, Caroline Webber (Francesca Hall), later admits that Liam has been abusive towards her. Because of this, Nigel legally adopts Clare after being awarded custody of her.

After mourning Debbie for a long period, Nigel grows close to barmaid Lorraine Wicks (Jacqueline Leonard) and attempts to ignite a relationship. This goes awry as Lorraine does not return Nigel's romantic feelings and is instead attracted to Grant, which deeply hurts Nigel. A couple of months later Nigel meets Julie Haye (Karen Henthorn), Clare's schoolteacher, who occasionally drops into his video shop to rent French films. Their friendship blossoms into romance, but Nigel remains reticent, believing he is tarnishing Debbie's memory. He almost loses Julie after she announces she is moving to Scotland, but on the night of her departure, Nigel sees sense and pledges his love for Julie and he and Clare leave Walford for Scotland to be with Julie and her son, Josh Saunders (Jon Lee).

Dot goes to stay with Nigel in 2001. In October 2009, it is revealed that Nigel has had a heart attack and Dot again goes to visit him, followed by another visit in 2014.

=== 2024–2026 ===
More than 26 years after he left Walford, Nigel returns and appears to be homeless when Yolande Trueman (Angela Wynter) encounters him at the local community centre on Christmas Eve; she serves him food and they become closely acquainted. The next day, he reunites with Phil and explains his situation; Nigel had split up with Julie and that he also lost contact with Clare years ago. When Phil learns that Nigel is living in a hostel, he offers Nigel a play to stay with him at his house; Nigel agrees but he doesn't fully know that Phil is partially doing this to cope with his loneliness and ongoing struggle with depression.

Nigel soon reunites with Sharon and they work together to try and help Phil with his mental health struggles. He subsequently meets some of Phil's extended family: his cousins Billy (Perry Fenwick) and Teddy (Roland Manookian), along with the former's wife Honey (Emma Barton) and adoptive son Jay Brown (Jamie Borthwick) as well as Teddy's son Harry (Elijah Holloway). Nigel also reunites with Kathy, who offers him a part-time job at the café. During his first shift, he receives a voicemail from Julie revealing she has not left him like he previously mentioned and is desperate for him to come home.

Whilst living with Phil at his house, Nigel displays signs of confusion and forgetfulness. After running away when an increasingly depressed Phil tries gifting Nigel his share of the boxing gym that he co-owns with Sharon, a conversation with Yolande makes Nigel reveal he has been diagnosed with early onset dementia and that he left Julie instead of telling her. Phil's wellbeing deteriorates and he rejects Nigel's numerous attempts to help, including helping him to spend time with his son Raymond Dawkins (Michael Jose Pomares Calixte) and with his other family members. After Phil lashes out at him, Nigel leaves but returns with Grant to help Phil once again. Phil attempts to die by suicide by shooting himself, but Grant and Nigel stop him before they along with Sharon's best-friend Linda Carter (Kellie Bright) all make Phil realise that he needs help. Phil admits himself into a mental health facility to be strong for Nigel when he reveals to Phil that he has dementia. Nigel begins to fall out with Grant over his failure to support Phil, but the two reconcile and bid an emotional farewell to each other before Grant returns to Portugal.

From then onwards Nigel's dementia progresses more, resulting in him forgetting Phil is at a mental health clinic; burning his hand after forgetting to put on oven mittens; nearly telling Phil's granddaughter Lexi Pearce (Isabella Brown) that her grandfather is in a mental health clinic; and confusing her for Clare. Eventually Julie comes back to the square, where both she and Phil work together to help Nigel as his health continues to decline throughout the rest of the year. Eventually, after an incident where he gets angry and unintentionally hits Julie, she and Phil begin discussions placing Nigel in a care home so he can have professional help, despite Phil's reluctance due to his promise to look after him. During Christmas 2025, Nigel's dementia causes him to hallucinate his old friends Pat Evans (Pam St Clement) and Barry Evans (Shaun Williamson) alongside his previous wife Debbie, who he shares a final dance with. After a heart-to-heart with Phil, he agrees to be placed in care. Despite this, Phil is still reluctant when Nigel becomes confused and scared while visiting a potential care home, leading to Phil and Julie clashing and resulting in her and Nigel temporarily moving out of Phil's to stay at a boutique hotel owned by Linda's mother Elaine Peacock (Harriet Thorpe) just across the Square.

In early 2026, Nigel falls asleep in the bath and nearly drowns. Phil finds Nigel unconscious in the tub and when he is taken to the hospital, Phil and Julie find out he has contracted pneumonia, When he is ready to be discharged, a place in a care home opens for Nigel. After Julie calls her, Clare returns to Walford and is hurt when Nigel is unable to recognise her, instead identifying Lexi as Clare. It is revealed that Clare and Nigel became estranged due to the former pawning Debbie's wedding ring. Lexi and Clare secretly take Nigel back to Walford ahead of his departure for the care home, where the residents have organised a farewell party for him in the Vic. With Julie's help, Nigel briefly recognises Clare, gladdening her. However, when Phil and Clare help Julie take him to the care home, Nigel hits Clare, causing her to leave in tears. Meanwhile, overwhelmed and hurt at Nigel's condition, Phil emotionally bids him farewell, saying he cannot look after him any more.

Julie continues to visit and look after Nigel while he is the care home. However, Phil can't bring himself to see him due to sadness and guilt. In April 2026, after Nigel contracts pneumonia again, Grant returns to the Square after his estranged son, Mark Fowler (Stephen Aaron-Sipple) contacts him. He is shocked to see how much Nigel has deteriorated and is angry that Phil did not inform him. When Grant tells Phil that Nigel asked him for a stone, Phil travels to the seaside to look for one. Grant finds him there and urges Phil to return to the care home, as Nigel will not live much longer. They travel back to the home, but Grant's car breaks down on the way. A pizza delivery man gives Phil a lift, while Grant heads back to Walford. While Nigel is dying, he is visited by Lexi, Yolande, Linda, Sam Mitchell (Kim Medcalf), and Callum Highway (Tony Clay). Phil arrives just in time. He gives the stone to Nigel and the episode transitions to a young Nigel (Edward Gilchrist) skipping the stone in the sea. Back in the care home, Nigel peacefully passes away and Phil and Julie tearfully embrace each other. Nigel's funeral is held in May 2026. Shortly afterwards, Julie opens a letter Nigel had written to her before dying and it is revealed that Nigel has a pension to be used to pay for his and Julie's planned trip to India. After advising Phil to look to the future in honour of Nigel, Julie leaves for the trip.

== Reception ==
In 2020, Sara Wallis and Ian Hyland from the Daily Mirror placed Nigel 90th on their ranked list of the best EastEnders characters of all time, calling him "Nerdy" and Grant's "conscience" who was famous for his "natty shirts and ties". For his role as Nigel, Bradley was longlisted for "Best Actor" at the 2025 Inside Soap Awards. The following year, Bradley was longlisted for "Best Actor" at the 2026 Inside Soap Awards, whilst the character's death was longlisted for "Best Exit", "Nigel's dementia & final goodbye" was longlisted for "Best Storyline" and the "Nigel's 90's Special" episode was longlisted for "Best Showstopper".
