= Gemma Bissix =

English actress (born 1983)

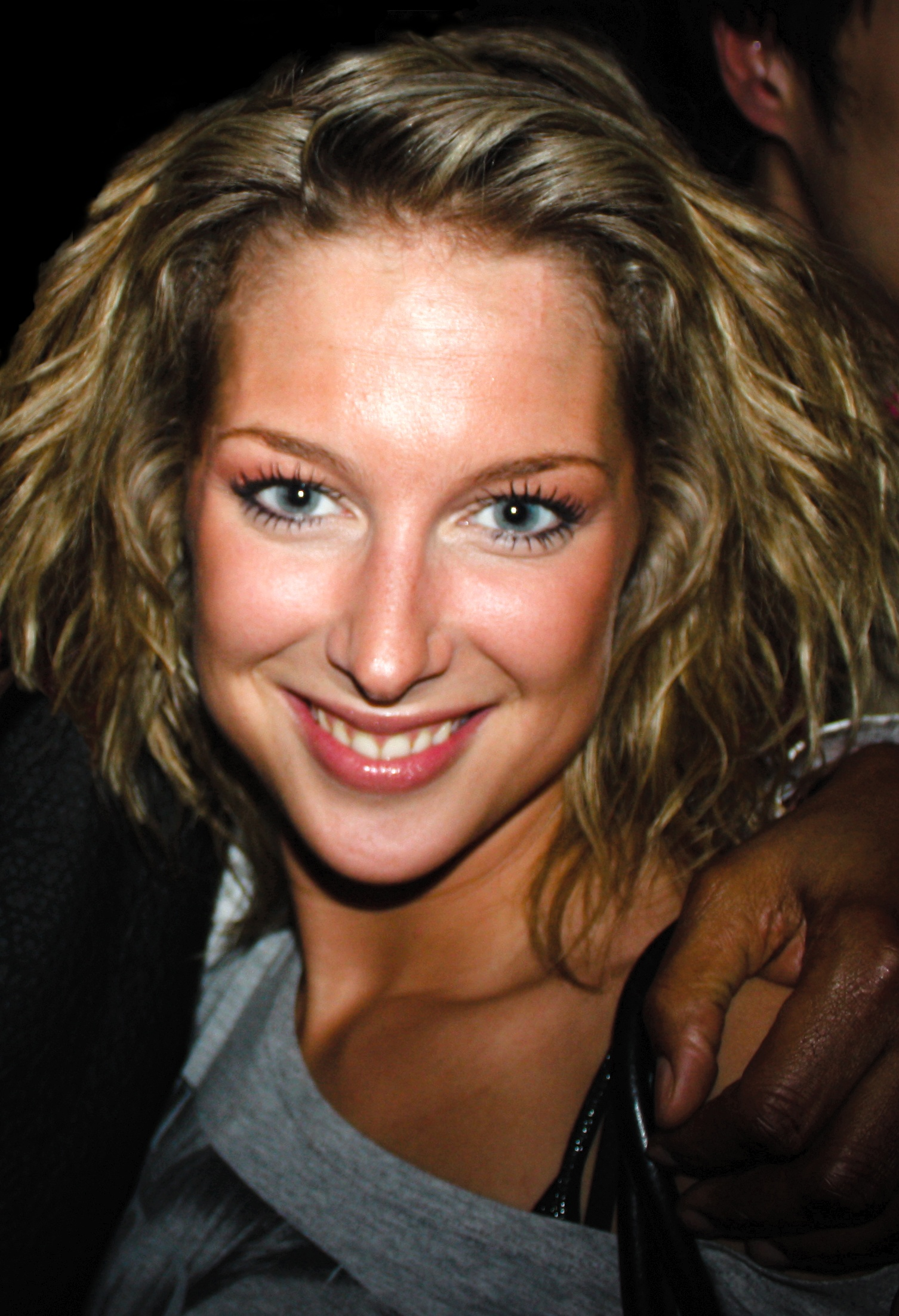
- Bissix in 2010
- Born: Gemma Louise Bissix; 6 June 1983 (age 42); Chertsey, Surrey, England
- Occupation: Actress
- Years active: 1993–present
- Television: EastEnders; Hollyoaks
- Spouse: Kristian Ruse (m. 2018)
- Children: 2

Gemma Louise Bissix (born 6 June 1983) is an English actress, best known for portraying the roles of Clare Bates in the BBC soap opera EastEnders (1993–1998, 2008, 2026) and Clare Devine in the Channel 4 soap opera Hollyoaks (2006–2007, 2009, 2013, 2025–2026), winning two British Soap Awards for the latter role. She also appeared in various other television shows and stage productions and was a contestant on the fourth series of Dancing on Ice in 2009.

== Early life ==
Gemma Louise Bissix was born on 6 June 1983 in St Peter's Hospital in Chertsey, Surrey. She is the eldest of five siblings. Her parents divorced when she was 11. She was brought up in Elmbridge, Surrey, and attended Thames Ditton Primary School and Hinchley Wood School.

== Career ==
=== EastEnders and Hollyoaks ===
Bissix began her acting career at the age of nine, in 1993, when she was cast as Clare Tyler (later Bates), the daughter of Debbie Tyler (Nicola Duffett) and stepdaughter of Nigel Bates (Paul Bradley), in the long-running BBC soap opera EastEnders. Her first acting role, Bissix had received no formal training, and has since commented, "that was my training [...] quite a lot of people [attend] drama school, I was trained by EastEnders."

Following her departure from EastEnders, Bissix took a break from acting. After leaving school, she ran a pub for two years, worked for her father's electrical wholesalers, and also worked in Marks & Spencer as a bra measurer. However, she still desired to act, and continued to audition for roles. In 2000, she guest starred in the Doctor Who radio drama "The Fires of Vulcan'", and in 2002 she returned to television, guest starring in an episode of the medical drama series Doctors. She then played Sadie in an episode of the CBBC show The Crust and also appeared in various pantomimes and adverts.

In April 2006, she joined the cast of the Channel 4 soap opera Hollyoaks, playing Clare Devine (later Cunningham). She took over the role from model and actress Samantha Rowley, who had played the character since November 2005, but was subsequently axed because the producers wished to take the character, who had been cast as a likeable teenager until this point, into a darker and more "evil" persona, and Rowley did not want to play a villain. Hollyoaks producer Bryan Kirkwood commented, "Gemma was a fantastic asset to the Hollyoaks cast. Recasting Gemma in the role of Clare was the first thing I did when I joined Hollyoaks and it was a decision which paid off handsomely. She was excellent in the role of Clare Cunningham and I wish her all the best of luck..."

In September 2007, Bissix departed Hollyoaks. Her character Clare Devine had been presumed dead, however it was subsequently revealed that she was in fact alive and was seen in an airport lounge. The same month, it was announced that Bissix would be reprising her role as Clare Bates in EastEnders, ten years after she had last appeared in the soap. She was reintroduced by the executive producer of EastEnders, Diederick Santer, and returned on-screen on 1 February 2008. Of her decision to return to EastEnders, Bissix has said, "I'm ecstatic. It really is fantastic. Clare's a deeper character [than Clare was in Hollyoaks] – I've got more scope with her and it's more of a challenge. I'm back home...". It was announced in May 2008 that Bissix was leaving the soap once again, and she departed in August 2008.

She returned to Hollyoaks as Clare Devine for a brief stint in May 2009. Discussing her soap opera roles in EastEnders and Hollyoaks Bissix said, "For me they're completely different. I prefer Hollyoaks Clare because she is just so much fun to play. I was saying to somebody that if she was in the real world, she'd be in prison or on death row. With the EastEnders Clare she was more realistic. We all know somebody like that – a little tart trying to get a bit of money where she can." In February 2013, it was confirmed that Bissix would reprise her role as villain Clare Devine, and departed when the character was supposedly killed off in October 2013. In April 2025, it was announced that Bissix would be returning as the character again, thus resurrecting Clare from the dead. She returned the following month and was central in the soap's 30th anniversary celebrations.

In February 2026, it was announced that Bissix would be returning to EastEnders as Clare Bates again, as part of her on-screen stepfather Nigel's dementia storyline.

=== Other work ===
In March 2008, Bissix appeared on a Sport Relief special of Strictly Come Dancing, dancing with cricketer and winner of the third series, Darren Gough, to raise money for the charity appeal. The pair scored 22 out of 30 points with their dance, the American Smooth. She also appeared in an EastEnders special edition of The Weakest Link in June 2008. She was voted off in the first round. In November 2008, Bissix appeared in an episode of the ITV musical drama series Britannia High.

In January 2009, Bissix appeared as a contestant on the fourth series of Dancing on Ice. She was partnered with Andrei Lipanov, and was the second contestant to be eliminated after her first performance, losing the skate-off to Melinda Messenger and Fred Palascak. Bissix said she was "absolutely gutted" after being voted off, as she was the show's "biggest fan". She later took part in the Sense City Ice Skate challenge in support of Sense–National Deafblind and Rubella Association. The same year, she appeared as a contestant on Celebrity MasterChef. In October 2009, she appeared on the BBC One show Hole in the Wall. She was a member of the winning team, donating the winnings to the White Lodge centre for disabled adults in Chertsey, of which she is a Patron. Since 2009, Bissix has been a panellist on some editions of the Channel 5 talk show The Wright Stuff, contributing to a newspaper review and topical debate. She toured in Victor Leigh's stage play The Game of Murder for two months, beginning in August 2009. She appeared in pantomime as the Bad Fairy in Sleeping Beauty at the Theatre Royal, Bath in December 2009. The same year, it was announced that she would be collaborating with Echo Falls wine. In 2010, she appeared in pantomime again as Cinderella at Fairfield Halls, Croydon, and in the following year, she appeared in the murder mystery theatre production Busybody.

In 2011, she appeared on a celebrity edition of the BBC One show Total Wipeout and made a further pantomime appearance at the Grove Theatre, Dunstable in Jack and the Beanstalk. Bissix toured the UK as Shirley Smith in Mike Stott's comedy play Funny Peculiar in 2012.

== Personal life ==
Bissix married Kristian Ruse in 2018, and they have two daughters together. She has also been a patron of the White Lodge Centre for disabled adults and children in Chertsey, and hosted charity auctions at Reds, in Weybridge, a bar previously run by her father and uncle.

== Filmography ==
Year	Programme	Role	Notes	Ref.
1993–1998, 2008, 2026	EastEnders	Clare Bates	Regular role	
2002	Doctors	Roxanne Lloyd	Episode: "A Crisis of Faith"	
2005	The Crust	Sadie	Episode: "Pizza Passion"	
2006–2007, 2009, 2013, 2025–present	Hollyoaks	Clare Devine	Regular role	
2008	Britannia High	Lizzie Porter	Episode: "Fame"	
2009	Dancing on Ice	Herself	Contestant; series 4	
2009	Celebrity MasterChef	Herself	Contestant; series 4	
2011	Washed Up	Claudia Weathers	Television film	
2012	Crime Stories	Fiona Anderson	1 episode	
2017	Ghetto Heaven	Amanda Hughes	Television series	

== Awards and nominations ==
Year	Ceremony	Award	Nominated work	Result	Ref.
2007	British Soap Awards	Villain of the Year	Hollyoaks as Clare Devine	Won	
2007	British Soap Awards	Best Actress	Hollyoaks as Clare Devine	Nominated	
2007	British Soap Awards	Most Spectacular Scene	Hollyoaks as Clare Devine	Nominated	
2007	British Soap Awards	Best Storyline	Hollyoaks as Clare Devine	Nominated	
2007	Inside Soap Awards	Best Actress	Hollyoaks as Clare Devine	Nominated	
2007	Inside Soap Awards	Best Bitch	Hollyoaks as Clare Devine	Nominated	
2007	Inside Soap Awards	Best Storyline	Hollyoaks as Clare Devine	Nominated	
2008	Digital Spy Soap Awards	Best Exit	Hollyoaks as Clare Devine	Won	
2008	British Soap Awards	Best Exit	Hollyoaks as Clare Devine	Won	
2008	British Soap Awards	Most Spectacular Scene	Hollyoaks as Clare Devine	Won	
2008	Inside Soap Awards	Best Bitch	Hollyoaks as Clare Devine	Nominated	
2008	Inside Soap Awards	Best Bitch	EastEnders as Clare Bates	Nominated	
