= Paul Bradley (English actor) =

English actor (born 1955)

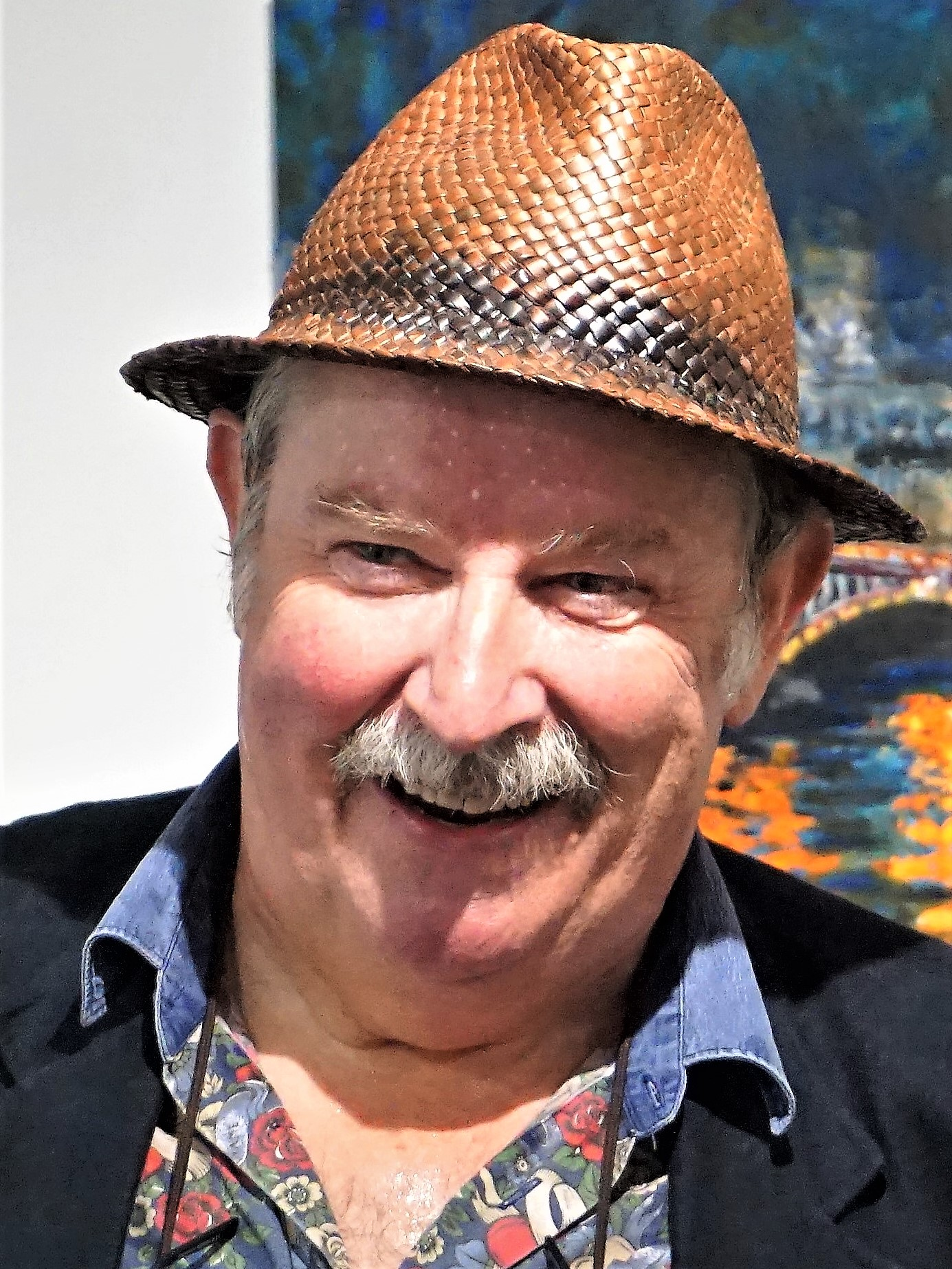
- Bradley in 2018
- Born: 28 May 1955 (age 71); Nuneaton, Warwickshire, England
- Occupation: Actor
- Years active: 1986–present
- Known for: EastEnders; Holby City

Paul Bradley (born 28 May 1955) is an English actor. He is best known for his roles as Nigel Bates in EastEnders (1992–1998, 2024–2026) and Elliot Hope in Holby City (2005–2015, 2019, 2022).

== Life and career ==
Bradley was born in Nuneaton, Warwickshire, one of six siblings (five brothers and one sister) born to Irish parents. Bradley was educated at St Benedict's School and the University of Manchester before joining the Royal Exchange, Manchester repertory theatre company in the early 1980s.

In addition to the television series already mentioned, Bradley has had roles in The Young Ones, The Bill, Red Dwarf, Bottom, My Family and Alas Smith and Jones. He also had a minor role in the 2002 film The Pianist.

As a guitarist and vocalist, he co-leads the group The hKippers (the 'h' is silent) with Stephen Warbeck, Academy Award-winning composer of Shakespeare in Love.

In the summer of 2021, Bradley played Major Metcalfe in the long running West End play The Mousetrap.

== Selected filmography ==
- The Young Ones (1982), Pilot/Warlock
- The Comic Strip Presents (1986), Jerry
- The Bill (1988), Henshaw
- Red Dwarf (1988, 1999), Chen
- Boon (1990), Clerk
- Murder Most Horrid (1991), Sergeant
- Bottom (1992), Burglar
- Alas Smith and Jones (1992)
- EastEnders (1992–1998, 2024–2026), Nigel Bates
- C.U. Burn (1997), Doctor (one episode, Hata sa Leaba)
- The Pianist (2002), Yehuda
- Doctors (2004, 2018), Patient with OCD / Billy Bourke
- My Family (2002, 2004), Mr.Spuffet
- Twisted Tales (2005), Mr. Pandemic
- Holby City (2005–2015, 2019, 2022), Elliot Hope
- Beyond Paradise (2024), Noah Culpepper
- The Burning Girls (2024), Reverend Brian Rushton
