= List of EastEnders characters introduced in 2022 =

EastEnders logo

EastEnders is a BBC soap opera that first aired on 19 February 1985. The following is a list of characters that first appeared in 2022, in order of first appearance. All characters are introduced by the show's senior executive producer, Kate Oates, executive producer, Jon Sen, or his successor, Chris Clenshaw. The first character to be introduced is Nina Gupta (Hersha Verity) in February, who was introduced as the new GP. Lewis Butler (Aidan O'Callaghan), a man that Kathy Beale (Gillian Taylforth) hires as the manager of her bar, was introduced in April, and Omar Lye-Fook debuted in July as Avery Baker, the brother of established character Mitch Baker (Roger Griffiths). He was followed by his sons, Finley (Ashley Byam) and Felix (Matthew James Morrison). Nina's stepson, Ravi Gulati (Aaron Thiara), was also introduced in July. Suki Panesar's (Balvinder Sopal) husband and the father of the Panesar children, Nish (Navin Chowdhry), made his debut in September and Reiss Colwell (Jonny Freeman), a relative of Dot Cotton (June Brown) and a love interest for Sonia Fowler (Natalie Cassidy) is introduced at the end of December. Additionally, multiple other characters have appeared throughout the year.

== Nina Gupta ==
Nina Gupta
- EastEnders character
- Portrayed by: Hersha Verity
- Duration: 2022, 2026
- First appearance: Episode 6432; 10 February 2022
- Last appearance: Episode 7315; 20 April 2026
- Introduced by: Jon Sen (2022); Ben Wadey (2026)
In-universe information
- Occupation: General practitioner
- Husband: Ranveer Gulati (2022)
- Stepsons: Ravi Gulati (adoptive)

Doctor Nina Gupta, played by Hersha Verity, made her first appearance on 10 February and departed on 9 November. She made a one-off unannounced return on 20 April 2026. Nina is a doctor who tends to Kheerat Panesar (Jaz Deol) when he suffers food poisoning after eating a sandwich that he bought from Stacey's Baps. She reappears when Stacey Slater (Lacey Turner) brings her mother Jean (Gillian Wright) to a doctors appointment when she is convinced that Jean is having a manic episode. After Suki Panesar (Balvinder Sopal) buys a doctor's surgery, she hires Nina to run it alongside daughter Ash Panesar (Gurlaine Kaur Garcha).

Nina is later revealed to be the wife of Ranveer Gulati (Anil Goutam) and the adoptive stepmother of Ravi Gulati (Aaron Thiara). When Ravi saves Suki from Ranveer, he ends up killing him. The only person who knows this is Nina, and it is revealed that she and Ravi are having an affair. Nina and Ravi frame Suki for Ranveer's murder, but this is covered up by the Panesar family, and Kheerat later takes the blame for it. However, Ravi chooses his family over Nina, leading her to leave angrily after telling Ravi he was never good enough for her.

In April 2026, Ravi's partner, Priya Nandra-Hart (Sophie Khan Levy), rushes him to the hospital after he hurts himself in the leg while he is struggling mentally. Ravi is surprised to find that Nina is his doctor. While she is carrying out Ravi's risk assessment, she encourages him to take his upcoming therapy seriously before declaring that his mental health is the result of karma from his bad actions.

Verity was keen to portray Nina since she liked her characterisation, specifically noting her "complete confidence, no fear of failure, goes after what she wants." Hinting at the future of her character, Verity told Digital Spy: "There is a lot more to her that is slowly starting to unfold. She has a few wants and goals of her own that go far beyond the surgery. So I am excited for that to unfold!" She was also intrigued by Nina's connection to the Panesar family. She opined that Ash is a great character due to being emotional and reactive while also being feisty and speaking her mind. Verity hoped that Nina would form a long-term friendship with Ash.

On being cast on the soap, she said: "There is nothing like this kind of experience, it's so iconic. Just a part of British culture, so it's exciting, but that can be quite nerve-wracking! When I was walking through the corridors and saw the pictures on the wall, I felt a real sense of history. It just felt like I was part of something very special. You are stepping into history. It is a really nice place to experience being an actor." Verity's father would not allow her to watch EastEnders as a child so she found it amusing to be cast on the soap. Walking onto the set for the first time was an exciting experience for her due to being early in her acting career; it led her to "just take a moment and [be] so grateful to have this experience".

== Ranveer Gulati ==
Ranveer Gulati
- EastEnders character
- Portrayed by: Anil Goutam
- Duration: 2022–2023
- First appearance: Episode 6446; 7 March 2022
- Last appearance: Episode 6768; 14 September 2023
- Introduced by: Jon Sen
In-universe information
- Wife: Haspira Gulati (backstory); Nina Gupta (2022)
- Adoptive sons: Ravi Gulati
- Grandsons: Davinder "Nuggets" Gulati (adoptive)
- Granddaughters: Avani Nandra-Hart (adoptive)

Ranveer Gulati is the adoptive father of Ravi Gulati (Aaron Thiara) and husband of Nina Gupta (Hersha Verity) who first appears in Episode 6446 on 7 March. He was played by Anil Goutam. He is killed off by Ravi in Episode 6536, which aired on 10 August 2022. He makes further appearances after his character's death when his body was moved in Episode 6589, airing on 10 November 2022 and then three episodes on CCTV footage in Episode 6683 on 19 April 2023 and then in Episodes 6767 and 6768, airing between 13 and 14 September 2023. The first video appearance he was uncredited for.

Ranveer was a family friend of the Panesars who has entrusts Kheerat Panesar (Jaz Deol) to build him a house in Mumbai. He was married to Dr Nina Gupta, who ended up becoming Ravi's partner. When he attacks Kheerat's mother Suki (Balvinder Sopal) and tries to rape her in exchange for a business contract, she strikes him over the head with a clock. Ravi walks in and begins covering up the crime but Ranveer wakes up and begins attacking him. Ravi delivers the final blow to Ranveer's head, killing him, and later disposes of his body. Ranveer's body was found by a dog walker on 31 October 2022 and reported to the police, who then contact Ravi and Nina. When everyone else finds out, Kheerat accuses Ravi of killing Ranveer and threatens to go to police. Ravi tells him that Suki killed Ranveer. Kheerat later goes to prison, taking the blame for Ranveer's death.

After Ravi moves in with Chelsea Fox (Zaraah Abrahams), her mother, Denise Fox (Diane Parish), is furious. Denise discovers the CCTV footage of Ravi killing Ranveer on his laptop. She then tells Chelsea, Suki and Jack Branning (Scott Maslen). It was later revealed that Ranveer also attempted to rape Ravi's ex-girlfriend Priya Nandra-Hart (Sophie Khan Levy), and later paid her to abandon Ravi and their son Davinder "Nuggets" Gulati (Juhaim Rasul Choudhury), threatening to have her killed if she ever returned. Unbeknownst to Ravi and Ranveer, Priya was pregnant by Ravi for a second time with Avani Nandra-Hart (Aaliyah James) when Ranveer threatened her to leave. It was also revealed that he raped his PA Priti, who had told Ravi about it.

== Roland Highway ==
Roland Highway
- EastEnders character
- First appearance: Episode 6460; 30 March 2022
- Last appearance: Episode 6544; 25 August 2022
- Introduced by: Kate Oates
In-universe information
- Other names: Roly Highway
- Father: Stuart Highway
- Mother: Bernadette Taylor
- Adoptive mother: Rainie Cross
- Half-sisters: Zara Highway
- Grandfathers: Jonno Highway
- Grandmothers: Karen Taylor; Cora Cross (adoptive)
- Uncles: Callum Highway; Keanu Taylor; Keegan Baker; Chatham Taylor; Riley Taylor
- Aunts: Chantelle Atkins; Ava Hartman (adoptive); Tanya Cross (adoptive)
- First cousins: Peggy Mitchell Jnr; Mia Atkins; Mackenzie Atkins; Dexter Hartman (adoptive); Lauren Branning (adoptive); Abi Branning (adoptive); Oscar Branning (adoptive)
- Other relatives: Vi Highway; Louie Beale (adoptive); Abi Branning (adoptive); Jimmy Beale (adoptive)

Roland Highway is the son of Stuart (Ricky Champ) and Rainie Highway (Tanya Franks), born on-screen via surrogate Bernadette Taylor (Clair Norris) in episode 6460 first originally broadcast on 30 March 2022. The character left along with Stuart and Rainie in episode 6513, originally broadcast on 25 August 2022.

Stuart and Rainie first look for a surrogate after given the idea that this may work and potentially create a future for the both of them – Bernadette hears this and offers to be their surrogate after her family are struggling financially. Bernadette's mother Karen Taylor (Lorraine Stanley) and half-brother Keegan Baker (Zack Morris) are initially against the idea but are later convinced to accept the decision. Stuart and Rainie eventually accept Bernadette after much consideration but struggle to conceive anyhow: Bernadette is overweight and can not carry a pregnancy to full-term. Regardless of this, they still proceed with the surrogacy and are delighted when Bernadette finally is pregnant. Bernadette gives birth to Roland and initially decides to keep him; though eventually gives him to Rainie and Stuart after realising that she would never be Roland's true parent and he is loved by the two. Roland leaves Walford with Rainie after her marriage to Stuart breaks down, but they return and leave Walford with Stuart for a new life in North London.

== Lewis Butler ==
Lewis Butler
- EastEnders character
- Portrayed by: Aidan O'Callaghan
- First appearance: Episode 6466; 11 April 2022
- Last appearance: Episode 6540; 17 August 2022
- Introduced by: Kate Oates
In-universe information
- Occupation: Bar manager

Lewis Butler, played by Aidan O'Callaghan, made his first appearance on 11 April 2022. He was introduced as the new bar manager of the gay bar, the Prince Albert, after being hired by Kathy Beale (Gillian Taylforth). He chats up Callum Highway (Tony Clay), much to the annoyance of his husband Ben Mitchell (Max Bowden). The character and O'Callaghan's casting was announced on 6 April 2022 and it was confirmed that Lewis would appear in a storyline involving Callum and Ben, when he approves of Callum's new LGBTQ+ campaign at work despite Ben's objections. Lewis and Ben go on a night out, but Lewis is faced with homophobic abuse. On 23 April 2022, it was announced that Lewis would be involved in a male rape storyline in which the character rapes Ben. It was also revealed that EastEnders would be working with charities including Survivors UK, Survivors Manchester, and the Male Survivors Partnership to make sure that the storyline is covered as sensitively and accurately. It was confirmed on 17 August 2022 that O'Callaghan has left the soap with his final scenes airing that episode.

== Avery Baker ==
Avery Baker
- EastEnders character
- Portrayed by: Omar Lye-Fook
- First appearance: Episode 6515; 4 July 2022
- Last appearance: Episode 6522; 18 July 2022
- Introduced by: Chris Clenshaw
In-universe information
- Father: Tony Baker
- Brothers: Mitch Baker
- Wife: Celia Baker (backstory)
- Sons: Felix Baker
- Adoptive sons: Finlay Baker
- Nephews: Keegan Baker
- Nieces: Chantelle Atkins; Bailey Baker
- Other relatives: Mia Atkins; Mackenzie Atkins

Avery Baker, played by Omar Lye-Fook, made his first appearance on 4 July 2022. Avery is the estranged brother of Mitch Baker (Roger Griffiths) and will arrive with his sons Felix (Matthew James Morrison) and Finlay (Ashley Byam). Lye-Fook's casting and character were announced on 6 June 2022. Avery was described by Digital Spy's Justin Harp as having "a much different personality than his humble and caring brother". Avery is revealed to have a tense relationship with Mitch and Harp teased that it would potentially problems for him.

On joining EastEnders, Lye-Fook said: "I've been watching EastEnders since I was at school so it's such a surreal experience to now be part of the show". He also added: "I'm having so much fun and it's an honour to be working alongside this incredible cast". Executive producer Chris Clenshaw added: "The Baker Family bring a fresh, fierce, fun and exciting energy to the Square. Felix and Finlay are two very different firecrackers and, yes, these brothers fall out, take the mick and challenge each other, but none of that compares to their unswerving love and loyalty they have for one another. They may be charming young men, full of sass, swagger and strength but these brothers are Bakers and, like their father, Avery, have their own unique way of surviving. Omar, Matthew and Ashley all bring star quality to EastEnders and we're excited to see them bring Avery, Felix and Finlay to life. The Baker family are the just the start of some new faces landing in Walford later this year – so watch this space…" Shortly after his introduction, his sons revealed to Mitch that Avery has terminal cancer; Metro confirmed that the storyline would result in his death.

== Ravi Gulati ==
Ravi Gulati, played by Aaron Thiara, made his first appearance on 4 July 2022. Ravi was introduced as a cellmate of Phil Mitchell (Steve McFadden) and a former associate of Kheerat Panesar (Jaz Deol). Thiara's casting and character were also announced on the same day.

== Finlay Baker ==
Finlay Baker, played by Ashley Byam, made his first appearance on 7 July 2022. Finlay is the adoptive son of Avery Baker (Omar Lye-Fook) and half-brother of Felix Baker (Matthew James Morrison). The character and Byam's casting was announced on 6 June 2022. On his casting on the soap, Byam said: "I'm very excited to be joining the Square. Like many people I grew up with EastEnders; it was almost like an unspoken family tradition. My mum and I sat there together watching so many incredible and iconic storylines. So to now be joining this classic British TV drama is an honour, and I'm truly grateful. I can't wait for everyone to meet Finlay and see what lies ahead for him". Of Finlay, Harp (Digital Spy) said that Finlay will "discover his charm will only get him so far in the square" and described Finlay and Felix as "brothers who always have each other's backs in difficult times.

== Felix Baker ==
Felix Baker
- EastEnders character
- Portrayed by: Matthew James Morrison
- Duration: 2022–2025
- First appearance: Episode 6517; 7 July 2022
- Last appearance: Episode 7148; 1 July 2025
- Introduced by: Chris Clenshaw
In-universe information
- Other names: Tara Misu
- Occupation: Drag queen Bartender
- Father: Avery Baker
- Mother: Celia Baker
- Half-brothers: Finlay Baker
- Grandfathers: Tony Baker
- Uncles: Mitch Baker
- Aunts: Rosina
- First cousins: Chantelle Atkins; Keegan Baker; Bailey Baker
- Other relatives: Mackenzie Atkins; Mia Atkins

Felix Baker, played by Matthew James Morrison, made his first appearance on 7 July 2022. He is the son of Avery Baker (Omar Lye-Fook) and the half-brother of Finlay Baker (Ashley Byam). The character and Morrison's casting were announced on 6 June 2022 as an extension to the established Baker family. Felix is described as "quick with a witty retort" and will throw himself into life in Walford, but his quick-wit and frank honesty could get him into trouble. Of his relationship with his brother, the BBC said that "despite being the complete opposite of each other, Felix and Finlay present a united front and always have each other's backs". Executive producer Chris Clenshaw said of the family: "The Baker Family bring a fresh, fierce, fun and exciting energy to the Square. Felix and Finlay are two very different firecrackers and, yes, these brothers fall out, take the mick and challenge each other, but none of that compares to their unswerving love and loyalty they have for one another. They may be charming young men, full of sass, swagger and strength but these brothers are Bakers and, like their father, Avery, have their own unique way of surviving. Omar, Matthew and Ashley all bring star quality to EastEnders and we're excited to see them bring Avery, Felix and Finlay to life. The Baker family are the just the start of some new faces landing in Walford later this year – so watch this space…" Of his casting, Morrison said, "It's an honour to be a part of such a legendary show that I grew up watching. It hasn't quite sunk in yet, and I don't think it ever will. I'm having a ball getting to grips with Felix and cannot wait for you all to meet him!"

In June 2022, during Pride Month, it was revealed by the BBC that Felix is a drag queen whose alias is "Tara Misu". Morrison felt privileged to showcase drag to EastEnders viewers, as well as representing the LGBTQIA+ community, and he felt that it is "important for people to feel reflected on screen". Morrison had not done drag prior to the role and received mentoring from drag queen and contestant on the first series of RuPaul's Drag Race UK, Vinegar Strokes. The decision to write Felix as a drag queen received praise from Lucas Young, a drag queen who goes by the name of Ms Classpergers. They felt that it was a significant move from the soap and wished that they had that representation on-screen during their youth.

On 14 March 2025, EastEnders announced that Felix had been axed from the serial by new executive producer Ben Wadey. A BBC spokeswoman said: "We can confirm that Matthew will be leaving EastEnders later in the year. We wish him all the best for the future." Upon this announcement, Divya Soni described Felix's character to be "groundbreaking". Felix departed the series on 1 July 2025.

== Denzel Fox-Danes ==
Denzel Danes
- EastEnders character
- Portrayed by: Jaden Ladega
- Duration: 2022–present
- First appearance: Episode 6531; 2 August 2022
- Introduced by: Chris Clenshaw
In-universe information
- Occupation: Student
- Father: Howie Danes
- Mother: Delilah
- Stepmother: Kim Fox

Denzel Fox-Danes, played by Jaden Ladega, is the son of established character, Howie Danes (Delroy Atkinson) and makes his first appearance in episode 6531, originally broadcast on 2 August 2022. For his role as Denzel, Ladega was longlisted for "Best Young Performer" at the 2024 Inside Soap Awards.

Denzel befriends Davinder "Nugget" Gulati (Juhaim Rasul Choudhury), and they start bullying Amy Mitchell (Ellie Dadd) after Denzel takes a picture of Amy's legs and posts it all over social media. Amy's stepsister Chelsea Fox (Zaraah Abrahams) forces Denzel to delete the pictures. Denzel soon moves in with Howie and Chelsea's aunt Kim Fox (Tameka Empson) whilst his mother decides to stay in Ibiza. He soon begins a relationship with Amy much to the opposition of her father Jack Branning (Scott Maslen). In April 2023, Denzel and Kim are involved in a car accident when Kim crashes into the Argee Bhajee after being distracted by a text revealing her sister Denise's (Diane Parish) affair with Nuggets' father Ravi Gulati (Aaron Thiara). In January 2024, Denzel is attacked by Walford High student Logan (Liam Hatch) and his friends, after Denzel stands up to him. Yolande Trueman (Angela Wynter) attempts to help Denzel but trips over and is videoed by everyone. Denzel is embarrassed and fights with Nuggets after his sister, Avani Nandra-Hart (Aaliyah James), teases him about the incident. Because of this, Denzel decides to take up boxing and is mentored by George Knight (Colin Salmon). Denzel develops muscle dysmorphia and purchases steroids. His confidence grows and he starts flirting with other girls, which strains his relationship with Amy. She also becomes jealous of his friendship with fitness influencer Ebony (Annika Whiston) who Denzel collaborates with to make fitness videos. Denzel starts using steroids with Nuggets but Nuggets overdoses and Denzel confesses to Zack Hudson (James Farrar). Ravi reports Denzel to the police, but he is later released with a caution. Denzel breaks up with Amy when Nuggets lies that he and Amy kissed; however, Nuggets reveals the truth and Denzel and Amy reconcile. Denzel supports Amy when she is crushed during a stampede at Peggy's wine bar.

== Davinder "Nugget" Gulati ==
Davinder "Nugget" Gulati
- EastEnders character
- Portrayed by: Juhaim Rasul Choudhury
- Duration: 2022–present
- First appearance: Episode 6535; 9 August 2022
- Introduced by: Chris Clenshaw
In-universe information
- Other names: Davinder "Nugget" Panesar
- Occupation: Student
- Father: Ravi Gulati
- Mother: Priya Nandra-Hart
- Sisters: Avani Nandra-Hart
- Grandfathers: Nish Panesar; Ranveer Gulati (adoptive)
- Uncles: Kheerat Panesar; Jags Panesar; Vinny Panesar
- Aunts: Ash Panesar
- First cousins: Tyrion Ahmed

Davinder "Nugget" Gulati (also Panesar), played by Juhaim Rasul Choudhury, is the son of Ravi Gulati (Aaron Thiara) and Priya Nandra-Hart (Sophie Khan Levy), as well as being the adoptive grandson of Ranveer Gulati (Anil Goutam) and step grandson of Suki Panesar (Balvinder Sopal), who befriends Denzel Danes (Jaden Ladega). He joins in with Denzel when he begins bullying Amy Mitchell (Ellie Dadd), and continues to do so when Denzel begins a relationship with her. In September 2023, it was announced by EastEnders that Nugget’s mother and his secret sister would be introduced to the soap.

After Ravi has Kheerat Panesar (Jaz Singh Deol) attacked in prison, Suki Panesar (Balvinder Sopal) reveals the truth about Ravi killing his adoptive grandfather Ranveer (Anil Goutam). Nuggets later goes missing and is reported to the police by the family, to which they search hours for until he calls Suki for money and to reveal that he's safe, unbeknownst that he is staying with his mother Priya Nandra-Hart (Sophie Khan Levy) and sister Avani (Aaliyah James). They later find Nugget and Priya introduces herself to the family and later reveals the true paternity of Avani, to which they eventually move in. Nuggets later shows acceptance of Suki after she comes out as a lesbian and reveals her affair with Eve Unwin (Heather Peace). Nuggets becomes jealous of Denzel when his confidence and fitness improve due to taking steroids. Struggling to keep up with workouts and boxing training, Nuggets develops muscle dysmorphia and starts using steroids alongside Denzel. Feeling left out when Denzel deserts him to flirt with girls, Nuggets tries to kiss Amy, who rebuffs him. Nuggets then lies to Denzel, claiming Amy tried to kiss him, which ends Denzel and Amy's relationship. Nuggets' steroid use leads to an overdose, during which he witnesses Priya and his grandfather Nish Panesar (Navin Chowdhry) kissing. Although Nuggets recovers, his kidneys are not functioning properly, and he is told he might need dialysis. Upon informing Nish of his knowledge of him kissing Priya, Nish tricks the family into believing Priya took advantage of him, resulting in the Panesars disowning Priya; however, Nuggets reconciles with his mother when she helps him recover his friendship with Denzel.

Nugget becomes concerned for Suki's safety when she reconciles with Nish close to Halloween 2024, unaware that it is being done under duress after Nish discovered Suki's part in the murder of Keanu Taylor (Danny Walters). When Stacey Slater (Lacey Turner) expresses her concerns to Nuggets and Avani on Halloween night, they rush back to the house, where they prevent Nish's attempt to rape Suki. A remorseful Nish falsely confesses to Keanu's murder himself, resulting in his arrest, leaving Nuggets stunned. When Nish escapes from prison more than a month later, Nuggets is horrified to discover Nish hiding in a dilapidated house outside Walford; Nish then proceeds to guilt trip Nuggets into assisting him in evading the authorities by delivering food and water to the house and later faking his death in his plan to sabotage Suki and Eve's wedding. When Nuggets starts behaving suspiciously, Denise Fox (Diane Parish) follows him and sees him with Nish. Nish attacks Denise with a champagne bottle, and goes to Suki and Eve's wedding where he poisons Eve. He then grabs Suki and falls off the hotel balcony with her after Ravi pushes him. Nuggets is devastated by Nish's death, and blames Denise. Nuggets is furious when he catches Denise and Ravi embracing, causing him to clash with Denise.

== Eric Mitchell ==
Eric Mitchell
- EastEnders character
- Portrayed by: George Russo
- Duration: 2022, 2025
- First appearance: Episode 6550; 5 September 2022
- Last appearance: Episode 7066; 13 February 2025
- Introduced by: Chris Clenshaw (2022, 2025)
In-universe information
- Occupation: Career criminal
- Family: Mitchell
- Father: Philip Mitchell
- Mother: Sandra Mitchell
- Brothers: Archie Mitchell; Clive Mitchell
- Wife: Peggy Mitchell
- Sons: Phil Mitchell; Grant Mitchell
- Daughters: Sam Mitchell
- Grandsons: Ben Mitchell; Raymond Fox; Albie Watts; Mark Fowler Jnr; Ricky Branning
- Granddaughters: Louise Mitchell; Courtney Mitchell
- Nieces: Ronnie Mitchell; Roxy Mitchell
- First cousins: Ted Mitchell; Stevie Mitchell
- Other relatives: Billy Mitchell; Charlie Mitchell

Eric Mitchell, portrayed by George Russo, first appears in a flashback episode set in February 1979. Eric is the deceased husband of Peggy Mitchell (Barbara Windsor/Jaime Winstone) and father of Phil (Steve McFadden/Daniel Delaney), Grant (Ross Kemp/Teddy Jay) and Sam Mitchell (Kim Medcalf/Laila Murphy). In the episode, Eric learns that Phil has gotten a job at a garage and is furious. He leaves Peggy at home with Sam and forces Phil and Grant to join him in an armed robbery at a warehouse alongside his cousin Stevie Mitchell (Dean Roberts) and Stephen's sons: Charlie Mitchell (Charlie Heptinstall) and Billy Mitchell (Perry Fenwick/George Greenland). Peggy objects to this but Eric assaults her. They are later caught by a Security Guard, Malcolm Keeble (Christopher Pizzey), who is the father of DCI Samantha Keeble (Alison Newman). Billy falls from a ladder whilst trying to steal a VHS package and Eric orders everyone to leave and desert him. However, Phil and Grant decide to remain to save Billy, and Phil holds the policeman at gunpoint. Eric intervenes and takes the gun from Phil, shooting the policeman to death. When Phil confronts him over this, he plans to beat him. Peggy tries to stop Eric from attacking Phil and threatens him with a knife. Eric later hits Phil who eventually overpowers him and beats him. This spells the end of Eric's abuse of Phil, though he continues abusing Peggy until she calls the police on Eric for his abuse and he is arrested. Eric later developed prostate cancer and died from the disease in 1985. Eric has been mentioned several times in the show before appearing in the flashback episode.

Peggy (Jo Warne; later Barbara Windsor) married Eric because she was pregnant with their son Phil (Steve McFadden). Eric grew to be a keen boxer and he soon ended up working for his gangland boss, Johnny Allen (Billy Murray). This impacted the marriage as Johnny constantly taunted Eric, making him do demeaning jobs because Eric was a better boxer than him. Eric fell in love with a glamorous woman called Maureen Loftus and planned to elope with her, but he changed his mind at the last minute – unable to desert his family, who he grew to resent. Eric took his anger out on Peggy and was often violent towards her and Phil. The abuse eventually ended when Peggy told the police that Eric was involved in a Post office robbery and he was sent to prison. Peggy considered leaving when her sons, Phil and Grant (Ross Kemp) were teenagers, and once even tried to seduce Johnny, but he turned her down. It was then Eric had cheated on Peggy with Claudette Hubbard (Ellen Thomas), who he also intended to run away with, but he changed his mind again – leading to Claudette hating the entire family. Soon afterwards, Peggy turned to Eric's older brother Archie (Larry Lamb) for comfort because he was there for Peggy when Eric began to abuse her. She tried to save her marriage by having another child in 1975 – her only daughter Samantha (Danniella Westbrook; Kim Medcalf). Her relationship with Eric improved, but only temporarily, and when Kevin Masters (Colin McCormack) employed Peggy to work at his minicab firm, they ended up having a secret affair. When Eric developed prostate cancer, Peggy gave up work to care for him until he eventually died in 1985. Following Eric's death, Kevin acquainted himself with Peggy once more and her children grew to harbour resentment towards him.

== Stevie Mitchell ==
Stevie Mitchell
- EastEnders character
- Portrayed by: Dean Roberts (2022 flashback); Alan Ford (2024)
- Duration: 2022, 2024
- First appearance: Episode 6550; 5 September 2022
- Last appearance: Episode 6941; 11 July 2024
- Introduced by: Chris Clenshaw
In-universe information
- Family: Mitchell
- Father: Kenneth Mitchell
- Mother: Barbara Mitchell
- Brothers: Ted Mitchell
- Sisters: Renee Mitchell
- Wife: Val Mitchell (backstory); Connie Mitchell (backstory)
- Sons: Billy Mitchell; Charlie Mitchell; Teddy Mitchell
- Grandsons: Dan Pearce; Will Mitchell; Jamie Mitchell; Harry Mitchell; Barney Mitchell (adoptive)
- Granddaughters: Janet Mitchell
- First cousins: Eric Mitchell; Archie Mitchell; Clive Mitchell
- Other relatives: Lola Pearce; Lexi Pearce; Phil Mitchell; Grant Mitchell; Sam Mitchell; Ben Mitchell; Louise Mitchell

Stephen "Stevie" Mitchell is the father of Billy Mitchell (Perry Fenwick/George Greenland) and Charlie Mitchell (Charlie Heptinstall) and cousin of Eric Mitchell (George Russo), who appeared in Episode 6550, in which he was played by Dean Roberts through flashbacks. He and his wife, Val, put their children into a home when they were very young, but regained contact with them by 1979 when the flashback episode is set. It was announced on 28 December 2023 that Stephen would be reintroduced in the present day and would be portrayed by Alan Ford, though Ford's casting was initially revealed on 18 November 2023.

Ahead of playing Stevie, Roberts said: "I didn't really know too much about Stephen, I had to learn a lot about his character based on other people's opinions and I had done a lot of research on Billy when he first entered the show. It's interesting what Peggy says about him – that she's not too fond of that branch of the family. He seems to have a better relationship with his cousin Eric, they are like partners in crime. I see him as a very selfish character, a product of his era.". He added: "He's not a good father, we know that he put both his kids in a home. I don't know if he carries any guilt about that, I did try to bear that in mind. I put a lot of thought into him. I thought the back story was very interesting – I think Stephen is quite envious of Eric and Peggy's family dynamic."

In January 2024, Stephen now Stevie, is seen at Aunt Sal's (Anna Karen) funeral where he meets his relative Phil Mitchell (Steve McFadden). Phil bans Stevie from attending the wake, and threatens him to stay away from the Mitchell's because of his poor treatment to Billy. Stevie returns against Phil's wishes and tries to make amends with Billy. Billy cannot forgive Stevie for his favoritism towards his older brother Charlie and for telling Billy that he had wished that he had died instead of Charlie. Stevie bonds with his grandchildren Janet (Grace) and Will (Freddie Phillips) and great-great-granddaughter Lexi Pearce (Isabella Brown) which Billy initially objects to. Stevie flirts with Mo Harris (Laila Morse) and they begin a relationship. When Will is catfished and blackmailed by Kyle Fletcher (Freddie Hastwel) who threatens to expose his nudes, Stevie and Mo sell stolen toasters to raise money but are shut down by Will's mother Honey Mitchell (Emma Barton) who forces them to give the money away to a charity fundraiser in honour of his great-granddaughter Lola Pearce (Danielle Harold). The charity money is stolen and Stevie is blamed and ostracized. Stevie confronts Will who he believes has stolen the money, and tries to convince him to return it. Will pushes him and Stevie falls unconscious, resulting in him being hospitalised. It is revealed that Stevie has another son Teddy Mitchell (Roland Manookian) who he has hidden from his family. Stevie is forced to reveal Teddy's identity to the Mitchells, and explains that Teddy was conceived during a short affair with a woman named Connie. During a family argument, Will exonerates Stevie by revealing that he had taken the money to pay off Kyle. Billy and Teddy throw Stevie a birthday party, and Stevie has a conversation with Teddy about Billy's mother Val, which Phil overhears. Phil discovers from Ritchie Scott (Sian Webber) that Val has been dead for several years and tells Billy. Stevie reveals that his affair with Connie drove Val to commit suicide and that he couldn't cope as a single parent, so put Billy in foster care as a temporary solution, but struggled to reclaim him. Billy struggles to forgive Stevie for concealing Val's death from him, so Stevie decides to leave Walford. As a final act of revenge, Stevie steals Phil's car keys and sells Phil's car with Mo, and leaves the money for Billy. After an emotional farewell with his family and Mo, Stevie leaves in the back of a taxi.

== Charlie Mitchell ==
Charlie Mitchell
- EastEnders character
- Portrayed by: Charlie Heptinstall
- Appears in: Episode 6550; 5 September 2022
In-universe information
- Family: Mitchell
- Father: Stevie Mitchell
- Mother: Val Mitchell
- Brothers: Billy Mitchell
- Half-brothers: Teddy Mitchell
- Wife: Lynne Mitchell
- Sons: Jamie Mitchell
- Other relatives: Eric Mitchell; Phil Mitchell; Grant Mitchell; Sam Mitchell

Charlie Mitchell is the deceased brother of Billy Mitchell (Perry Fenwick/George Greenland) and father of Jamie Mitchell (Jack Ryder), who appears in Episode 6550 and is played by Charlie Heptinstall. Apart from the flashback episode set in 1979, Charlie has never been seen. Ahead of the flashback episode, Heptinstall suggested that his character would be similar to his brother, Billy: "As a Mitchell, he shares traits with his brother, he's always there and loyal to the family. He still goes and does naughty things, but he is more free, not seriously clued into what's really happening. Charlie would walk into the room with family drama and see some food on the table and be like "Oh ok, let's eat.""

It has been revealed that he met Lynne in 1979 and married her in 1982 when he had Jamie with her before she died four years later. Charlie died from a heart condition in 1998, leaving Billy as Jamie's legal guardian, shortly before Billy's arrival in Walford. However, due to Billy's abuse towards Jamie, Charlie's cousin Phil Mitchell (Steve McFadden) becomes Jamie's guardian as he is his godfather. Jamie was killed on Christmas Day 2002, when he was accidentally run over by Martin Fowler (James Alexandrou). Charlie also died not knowing that his father Stevie Mitchell (Alan Ford) is still alive, or that he has a half-brother, Teddy Mitchell (Roland Manookian).

== Nish Panesar ==
Nish Panesar, played by Navin Chowdhry, is the estranged husband of Suki Panesar (Balvinder Sopal) and the father of Kheerat (Jaz Deol), Jags (Amar Adatia), Vinny (Shiv Jalota) and Ash (Gurlaine Kaur Garcha). Chowdhry's casting as Nish was announced on 28 August 2022 and it was confirmed that he had already begun filming at the time. He arrives in Walford following a 20-year stretch in prison for murder. Prior to their time on EastEnders, Nish mentally abused and controlled Suki throughout their marriage. Nish arrives determined to repair his family relationships, including his marriage to Suki. Nish was described as a charming and charasmatic character, but they confirmed that viewers would quickly notice that he is "ice-cold, manipulative and driven by a need for power and respect".

On his casting, Chowdhry said that since he had never worked on a soap prior to EastEnders, the experience was all new for him. However, he loved the storylines given to him upon his debut. He particularly vented an interest in his onscreen family and liked that "there's so much happening at all times" in the Panesar unit. He found Nish to be an interesting and unconventional character, which he said would bring drama and mayhem". He opined that under his bad persona, there is a good man, but confirmed that Nish would cause "turmoil" for the Panesars. Executive producer Chris Clenshaw echoed Chowdhry's excitement the character, since Nish had been referenced numerous times prior to his arrival on the series. Clenshaw continued: "The spectre of Nish Panesar is finally here, and it's been a pleasure welcoming Navin to the cast, and take to the role so effortlessly. He brings something to the character that none of us could've predicted – his dynamic on and off-screen, and we're excited to see where his character develops as the story grows."

== Reiss Colwell ==
Reiss Colwell
- EastEnders character
- Portrayed by: Jonny Freeman
- Duration: 2022–2025
- First appearance: Episode 6606; 12 December 2022
- Last appearance: Episode 7077; 3 March 2025
- Introduced by: Chris Clenshaw
In-universe information
- Occupation: Accountant
- Wife: Debbie Collins (until 2024)
- Daughters: Julia Fowler
- Grandfathers: Gerry Colwell
- Other relatives: Dot Cotton; Dotty Cotton; Nick Cotton

Reiss Colwell, played by Jonny Freeman, is the great-nephew of Dot Branning (June Brown) and a love interest for Sonia Fowler (Natalie Cassidy). He made his first appearance on the episode broadcast on 12 December 2022. Freeman's casting was announced on 22 November 2022. Of his casting, Freeman said that he was "delighted to be joining the cast of EastEnders as a part of Don Branning's extended family". He also emphasised the hospitality of his colleagues, foremost Natalie Cassidy, who is starring as Freemans love interest Sonia Fowler in the series. Freeman also described his role Reiss Colwell as "kind, but socially awkward".

Reiss arrives in Walford for Dot's funeral. He meets Dot's step-granddaughter, Sonia, and reveals that his family became estranged from Dot because of her marriage to Charlie Cotton (Christopher Hancock). He later has sex with Sonia after the wake. Reiss and Sonia begin a relationship and it later transpires that Reiss is still married to his wife Debbie Colwell (Jenny Meier), who has been in an irreversible coma following a severe stroke for many years. Sonia forgives him and they decide to try for a baby via IVF since Reiss cannot conceive naturally. Reiss starts working as an accountant for Keanu Taylor (Danny Walters) at Taylor's Autos and they become friends. Sonia is unaware that Reiss is using Debbie's life savings to fund the treatment and he keeps this a secret. Reiss has a feud with Sonia's half-sister Bianca Jackson (Patsy Palmer) who constantly teases Reiss. She follows him to Debbie's care home and overhears him admitting to using Debbie's money for IVF. She forces him to confess to Sonia but Sonia supports Reiss, and they agree to continue using Debbie's money since Reiss has legal control of her finances. When Reiss's debt becomes unmanageable, he resorts to conning Sharon Watts (Letitia Dean) by tricking her into investing so he can steal her money, but is caught by Phil Mitchell (Steve McFadden). Reiss then murders Debbie by smothering her with a pillow to avoid paying for her care home expenses.

The following week, Hugh (Michael Bertenshaw) and Brenda Collins (Nichola McAuliffe) arrive in Walford soon after to arrange plans for Debbie's funeral where Brenda expresses disdain and dislike for Reiss, suggesting that Debbie had planned to leave him before her stroke and was always complaining to her about Reiss' weird habits. Sonia, however, continues to support Reiss until she is subsequently arrested on suspicion of her murder, having been to visit Debbie before Reiss killed her, leaving her DNA on Debbie's pillow. Sonia is charged and sent to prison to await trial and a guilty, panicked Reiss quickly begins to draw more suspicion from Sonia's ex-husband, Martin Fowler (James Bye). Reiss tries to gain signatures to prove the community doesn't think she is guilty but is unsuccessful and his desperation worsens once an angry Bianca returns. Bianca, already suffering with depression, quickly believes Reiss is guilty of Debbie's murder, fuelled further by Brenda’s opinions about Reiss. Her behaviour becomes erratic, publicly accusing Reiss, who feigns panic and a timid nature. After Bianca smashes his car window with a brick, Kat Slater (Jessie Wallace) arranges for Bianca's father David Wicks (Michael French) to return from America to intervene. David confronts Reiss, interrogating him about Debbie's murder and Sonia's arrest before sending him to stay in Peterborough to put some distance between him and Bianca.

After Reiss returns, he has Debbie will reading and it is revealed that Debbie had made amendments to her will before her stroke, coma, and death. Reiss was shocked to be told that Debbie had named her parents as her sole beneficiaries, allowing them complete control over her financial assets.

This means that Reiss wouldn't get a penny of her life insurance policy money, he wasn't left empty-handed as Debbie left him with a doll's house, adding: "the dusty old thing it gives me the creeps", hinting she could have been talking about Reiss all along and Brenda was right.

However, Bianca is still not convinced and Reiss eventually confesses to what he did. He manages to convince Bianca he has evidence of Sonia's innocence in a storage locker he rents for band practice, leading Bianca there, where he subsequently imprisons her in a sound-proof room.

In January 2025, Reiss, still holding Bianca captive, becomes more concerned for Sonia's case as her trial begins, resulting in him antagonising Martin and others. Having been told by Sonia's lawyer that the nurse who witnessed Sonia leaving Debbie's room without signing in is the key witness to the prosecution, Reiss confronts her in the hope she will drop her statement; this results in the case being adjourned. Bianca is disgusted by Reiss's continued failure to confess and attempts to escape, but is thwarted by Reiss, who threatens to leave her to starve. When Sonia collapses upon the trial's resumption, she contemplates pleading guilty to avoid further stress for the baby. When Reiss tells Bianca about this, she persuades him to film a video of herself confessing to Debbie's murder and then allow her to go into hiding, promising not to implicate him in return. Reiss shows the video to the police and Sonia is acquitted after he smuggles the video to one of the jurors. Reiss evades questioning from Martin, Sonia and Kat, who believe that Bianca is lying to protect Sonia, by stressing the supposed truth of the confession. After returning to the storage locker, Reiss refuses to release Bianca, fearful that she will inform the police of his crimes.

As the weeks go by, Sonia becomes anxious to see the confession video, much to Reiss' chagrin; he alerts Sonia's uncle Jack Branning's (Scott Maslen) suspicions when he lies that the CPS instructed him to delete the video. Jack subsequently obtains the video from the CPS itself and after Sonia watches it, Reiss fully convinces her that Bianca did kill Debbie. The police eventually issue a warrant for Bianca's arrest, leading Reiss to deliver some tablets to the lockup, which he hopes Bianca will use to commit suicide; Bianca refuses. Reiss begins removing toys he and Debbie had bought from the lockup for his and Sonia's child, falsely claiming he was buying them from the charity shop; during these visits, he accidentally leaves the door unlocked, allowing Bianca to escape. Sonia eventually recognises Debbie's dollhouse from the confession video and realises Reiss' part in the confession video; Reiss subsequently confesses to murdering Debbie and kidnapping Bianca just as Bianca herself arrives and knocks Reiss out with a teapot. Bianca and Sonia flee to Jack's house to inform the police, but Reiss escapes before Jack arrives to arrest him.

Reiss returns to Sonia's, where he encounters Bianca. He tells her that he wants her to give Sonia a letter he wrote for her, and tries to leave, but Bianca attempts to stop him. Reiss eventually makes it to his car, still being chased down by Bianca, and after some failed attempts, his car starts and he drives off. As he is driving, Ian Beale (Adam Woodyatt) is pushed out into the road by Cindy Beale (Michelle Collins), causing Reiss to swerve and crash into the Queen Vic. Reiss is pulled out of the car by George Knight (Colin Salmon), but escapes before the flames of his burning car reach some gas bottles in the Queen Vic, causing an explosion which destroys the pub and traps Sonia and her cousin Lauren Branning (Jacqueline Jossa) inside. Reiss follows Bianca and Grant Mitchell (Ross Kemp) into the pub as they clear the way to rescue Sharon, Lauren and Sonia. Arriving in the kitchen of the Vic, Reiss confronts Sonia, Bianca and Lauren, resulting in Bianca pushing Reiss into a wall; the resulting impact collapses the roof above him, causing a bathtub to fall on Reiss and crush him to death.

== Other characters ==
Character	Episode date(s)	Actor	Circumstances
DI Marshall	14 January – 3 March (2 episodes)	Karis Pentecost	A police officer who arrests Aaron Monroe (Charlie Wernham) after his father, Harvey Monroe (Ross Boatman), calls the police to stop Aaron going to Manchester to bomb a mosque.
Claire Reid	20 January – 5 May (4 episodes)	Louise Rhian Poole	Scarlett Butcher's (Tabitha Byron) social worker. She speaks to Jay Brown (Jamie Borthwick) about Scarlett's mother Janine Butcher (Charlie Brooks) as Janine still has Jay down as her employer, despite not working for him anymore. Jay tells Claire the truth about Janine's past, hoping to ruin her chances at custody. Claire interviews Janine and Mick Carter (Danny Dyer) about their relationship but Janine is forced to admit that she has lied about the relationship and Claire says she must include this in her report. She later visits Scarlett and her carer Kat Slater (Jessie Wallace) about Scarlett's hearing date and is present when Janine is granted custody of Scarlett.
Hassan	24 January	Joe Ferrera	A man who Phil Mitchell (Steve McFadden) does a business negotiation with. He is interested in buying Phil's chicken shops, which are fronts for money laundering, but he offers £80,000 less than Phil is asking. Hassan calls off the deal when Jean Slater (Gillian Wright) interrupts, confronting Phil about a separate issue.
Henry	25–27 January (2 episodes)	Tim Fellingham	A courier who delivers parcels to Karen Taylor (Lorraine Stanley) at the laundrette. Karen and Henry flirt every time they meet and Karen thinks Henry is serious. He is later replaced by Nathan (Frankie Wade)
Ray	31 January	Uncredited	A man who supplies goods to Billy Mitchell's (Perry Fenwick) market stall.
Sid Bello	3 February – 28 March (7 episodes)	Buddy Skelton	Two students at the same school as Tommy Moon (Sonny Kendall). They see Tommy holding a rainbow cup during a gay pride party and make fun of him but he defends himself so Sid says he will see him at school the next day. Tommy is confident that Phil Mitchell (Steve McFadden) will defend him because he is practically his step-father. They later chase Tommy into the closed Indian restaurant but are scared off by Phil. After weeks of bullying, Tommy threatens them with a knife. When he tries to leave, Sid pushes him and Tommy hits him with his bag, accidentally stabbing him, which is recorded by Matty. Matty and Tommy run off leaving Sid to bleed on the ground.
Matty	3 February – 28 March (7 episodes)	Ryan Masher	
PC Cooper	3 February	Du'aine A Samuels	A police officer who detains Suki Panesar (Balvinder Sopal) and Eve Unwin (Heather Peace) in the back of his police van after they have an argument so they can calm down.
Chris	4 February	Nick Hooton	A repairman who fixes a leak at Karen Taylor's (Lorraine Stanley) house. Karen flirts with Chris.
Scott	7–8 February (2 episodes)	Darren Kent	A builder who inspects a derelict building, the Argee Bhajee, after a gas leak caused an explosion. Gray Atkins (Toby-Alexander Smith), who murdered Tina Carter (Luisa Bradshaw-White) and placed her body under the floor, impersonates an insurance broker to enquire about what will happen to the building, and Scott confirms that the floors need to be removed. He tells Gray the next day that his company have run out of money and cannot carry out the work.
Nurse Shauna Bell	7 February – 8 March (3 episodes)	Aurora Fearnley	A nurse who encourages Chelsea Atkins (Zaraah Abrahams) to hold her premature son, Jordan Atkins, for the first time instead of waiting for her husband, Gray Atkins (Toby-Alexander Smith) to arrive. She encourages his mother to bond with him.
Nathan	7–21 February (3 episodes)	Frankie Wade	A courier replacing Henry (Tim Fellingham). Karen Taylor (Lorraine Stanley) flirts with him and gives him her phone number but he finds it awkward. Kat Slater (Jessie Wallace) flirts with him to make her partner, Phil Mitchell (Steve McFadden), jealous. Phil overhears him calling Kat ugly and threatens to hurt him if he comes back. He later returns to flirt with Kat but Phil throws him out of the launderette.
Dr Archer	11 February	Maya Barcot	A doctor who follows up with Jean Slater's (Gillian Wright) bipolar disorder. She points out that Jean missed her last appointment and tries to get her to talk about her ovarian cancer but Jean refuses, saying she no longer has it. Dr Archer then becomes concerned about Jean's behaviour. However, they run out of time and she tells Jean to rebook an appointment, having issued a prescription.
Dr Forde	15 February	Harry Ter Haar	A doctor who treats Dotty Cotton (Milly Zero) in hospital after she passed out from drinking heavily. He warns her that her alcohol poisoning could have been fatal and gives her a leaflet.
Melody Wiles	15 February – 22 March (5 episodes)	Niamh Longford	Friends of Jada Lennox (Kelsey Calladine-Smith), who she bumps into in the café. They go to the park with Jada and Will Mitchell (Freddie Phillips), where Melody films Jada dancing. They organise a party at Sharon Watts' (Letitia Dean) house without Jada's permission; however, Sonia Fowler (Natalie Cassidy) ends the party when she discovers Will has been smoking.
Chess Newland	15 February – 22 March (5 episodes)	Liani Samuel	Friends of Jada Lennox (Kelsey Calladine-Smith), who she bumps into in the café. They go to the park with Jada and Will Mitchell (Freddie Phillips), where Melody films Jada dancing. They organise a party at Sharon Watts' (Letitia Dean) house without Jada's permission; however, Sonia Fowler (Natalie Cassidy) ends the party when she discovers Will has been smoking.
Trevor Barnes	17 February	Gordon Peaston	A friend of Tom "Rocky" Cotton (Brian Conley) who gives Dotty Cotton (Milly Zero) a card for his addiction counselling.
Miss Miles	17 February	Joan Hodges	A customer at Fox & Hair who dislikes Jada Lennox (Kelsey Calladine-Smith). As revenge, Jada steals her money and hides them under towels.
Amanda	17 February	Uncredited	A customer at Fox & Hair who is acquainted with Kim Fox (Tameka Empson).
Verity Ramsay	21 February – 31 March (2 episodes)	Lesley Vickerage	Verity (often referred to as Mrs. Ramsay) is the headteacher at Walford Preparatory School. Kim Fox (Tameka Empson) tells her that she can not afford to pay her daughter Pearl's (Arayah Harris-Buckle) school fees, so Verity suggests that she should apply for scholarship funding. Pearl later wins the scholarship.
Dr Brompton	24 February	Sarah Goddard	A doctor who is treating Jordan Atkins. She reveals that he is not making progress.
Teddy Graves	3–4 March (2 episodes)	Lary Olubamiwo	Teddy is a man who boxes Mick Carter (Danny Dyer) for charity. Mick's mother Shirley (Linda Henry) flirts with him and asks him to go easy on Mick. Mick wins the fight and offers him free drinks for a week.
Rita	4 March	Lucy Porter	A woman who Mitch Baker (Roger Griffiths) picks up from her house. She later asks Mitch on a date.
DI Walken	9 March	Tina Harris	A police officer who questions Kheerat Panesar (Jaz Deol) after he strikes Gray Atkins (Toby-Alexander Smith) over the head with a glass bottle in self-defence.
Tej Bansal	16–22 March (2 episodes)	Aishah Afzal	Tej is a solicitor who is representing Kheerat Panesar (Jaz Deol) after he strikes Gray Atkins (Toby-Alexander Smith) over the head with a glass bottle in self-defence. Dotty Cotton (Milly Zero) finds out that she works for the Panesars rivals, the Sharmas, and was deliberately giving Kheerat bad advice so that he remain in prison.
Gary	21 March	Guy Samuels	A man who delivers a bouncy castle to Jean Slater (Gillian Wright). She tells him to put it in Albert Square in front of The Queen Victoria public house.
Warren	28–31 March (2 episodes)	Ben Cutler	A man who sells Stuart Highway (Ricky Champ) alternative remedies for his breast cancer. Stuart goes to buy more remedies but stops when Warren calls his grandmother Vi Highway (Gwen Taylor) dirt when she exposes him as a fraud.
Lesley	28 March	Andrea Gordon	A woman who Chelsea Fox (Zaraah Abrahams) talks to when she wants to put her son Jordan Atkins up for adoption.
DI Bethany Crowe	29 March	Lynsey Murrell	The police officer who interviews Tommy Moon (Sonny Kendall) after he accidentally stabs Sid Bello (Buddy Skelton).
Bungalow	11 April	Ben Keenan	A man who Jean Slater (Gillian Wright) attends his stag do. Jean sees him getting married in Albert Square and when his bride throws the wedding bouquet, Jean catches it.
Steve Masters	13–18 April (3 episodes)	Reece Walters	Steve and his friends shout homophobic slurs at Lewis Butler (Aidan O'Callaghan) outside of The Prince Albert. Ben Mitchell (Max Bowden) witnesses this. The next day Ben follows Steve into an alleyway and hits him on the head with a copper pipe repeatedly until Sharon Watts (Letitia Dean) stops him. Steve is taken to hospital and Ben goes there to see how he is doing. Ben meets his mother, Kelly (Cathy Owen), and lies that he is an online friend of Steve's.
Martine	13–20 April (2 episodes)	Julie Barclay	A woman who works in a jewellers at Walford High Street, where Harvey Monroe (Ross Boatman) and Jean Slater (Gillian Wright) visit to look at engagement rings. Martine reveals that she has been divorced twice. She tries to sell Jean a ring from the cheap section but Harvey lies that he is a football manager for a Premier League team. Martine suggests that they look at the expensive rings and Jean secretly steals one of the rings before leaving. Jean returns to the High Street with her friend Shirley Carter (Linda Henry) and Martine sees Jean, telling her colleague, Lloyd, to call the police. Jean insists the ring is hers and pretends to have a mental breakdown, so Martine tells Shirley to get Jean out and keep the ring as their insurance will cover it.
Kelly	18 April	Cathy Owen	The mother of Steve Masters (Reece Walters). She meets Ben Mitchell (Max Bowden) when Steve is in hospital after Ben attacks him, but Ben says he is a friend of Steve's. Kelly tells the police that only one friend has visited Steve but she had not met him before, leading to the police thinking this person could be a suspect in the attack.
Lloyd	20 April	Uncredited	Martine's (Julie Barclay) colleague at the jewellery shop. When Martine accuses Jean Slater (Gillian Wright) of stealing a ring, Lloyd takes her inside the shop.
Gareth	2 May	Nick Jacobsen	Gareth and Kevin are boys who play chess at Walford Community Centre, and are friends with Bernadette Taylor (Clair Norris). One of the boys flirts with Dotty Cotton (Milly Zero) and teaches her the rules of chess. She ends up winning the match.
Kevin	2 May	Kieran Dooner	Gareth and Kevin are boys who play chess at Walford Community Centre, and are friends with Bernadette Taylor (Clair Norris). One of the boys flirts with Dotty Cotton (Milly Zero) and teaches her the rules of chess. She ends up winning the match.
Dr Johnson	2 May	Zara Tomkinson	The doctor who looks after Jean Slater (Gillian Wright) at a mental health facility.
Collin	4 May	Dimeji Ewuoso	The scout for Walford Town FC. He decides to sign up Tommy Moon (Sonny Kendall) after he is impressed with his football skills. He later overhears Martin Fowler (James Bye) talking with Zack Hudson (James Farrar), Nancy Carter (Maddy Hill) and Sam Mitchell (Kim Medcalf) about Tommy stabbing Sid Bello (Buddy Skelton), and decides to withdraw the offer.
Clara	5–23 May (3 episodes)	Emily Eaton-Plowright	An old friend of Frankie Lewis (Rose Ayling-Ellis) who she met in a fashion course at university.
Dave	7–8 June (2 episodes)	Richard Summers-Calvert	A mechanic hired by Kheerat Panesar (Jaz Deol) who is a friend of Jay Brown (Jamie Borthwick).
Delilah	1–4 August (2 episodes)	Chereen Buckley	The ex-partner of Howie Danes (Delroy Atkinson). She arrives with their teenage son Denzel (Jaden Ladega) and arranges for him to live with Howie and his girlfriend Kim Fox (Tameka Empson) while she is away in Ibiza. She argues with Kim and Howie then leaves. Howie later learns that Delilah will be staying in Ibiza longer than two weeks.
Malcolm Keeble	5 September	Christopher Pizzey	The deceased father of Samantha Keeble (Alison Newman), seen in a flashback to 1979. He is shot dead by Eric Mitchell (George Russo) during a raid on a VCR warehouse.
Mrs Keeble	5 September	Lizzie Grace	The mother of Samantha Keeble (Alison Newman), seen in a flashback to 1979. She appears when a policeman arrives to break the news of her husband Malcolm's (Christopher Pizzey) death.
Don	8 November	Nick Nevern	The ex-boyfriend of Sam Mitchell (Kim Medcalf) who arrives in Walford to try and win her back; however, Zack Hudson (James Farrar) scares him off and he leaves
Craig Erskine	4 July – 7 July (3 episodes)	Connor Mills	A prisoner at HMP Walford and a nemesis of Phil Mitchell (Steve McFadden). Craig threatens Phil and his cellmate Ravi Gulati (Aaron Thiara) before orchestrating a prison riot to have Phil killed. He is ultimately killed during the confrontation.
