= Priya Nandra-Hart =

Fictional character from EastEnders

- EastEnders character
- Portrayed by: Sophie Khan Levy
- Duration: 2023–2026
- First appearance: Episode 6789; 16 October 2023
- Last appearance: Episode 7404; 22 September 2026
- Introduced by: Chris Clenshaw
In-universe information
- Occupation: Shop assistant Car saleswoman
- Sons: Davinder "Nugget" Gulati
- Daughters: Avani Nandra-Hart

Priya Nandra-Hart is a fictional character from the BBC soap opera EastEnders, played by Sophie Khan Levy. Introduced in October 2023, she is the former partner of Ravi Gulati (Aaron Thiara) and mother of Davinder "Nugget" Gulati (Juhaim Rasul Choudhury) and Avani Nandra-Hart (Aaliyah James). Priya's storylines have involved her complicated relationships within the Panesar family, particularly with Ravi and Nish Panesar (Navin Chowdry), and revelations about her past. Khan Levy's performance earned her a nomination for Best Newcomer at the 2024 Inside Soap Awards. On 22 September 2026, Khan Levy made an unannounced exit as Priya, due to her real-life pregnancy.

Her storylines have focused on her surprising arrival and reuniting with her son Davinder "Nugget" Gulati (Juhaim Rasul Choudhury) after years estranged; hiding a secret daughter, Avani Nandra-Hart (Aaliyah James), from Ravi Gulati (Aaron Thiara); her one-night-stand with Peter Beale (Thomas Law) upon arrival; revealing Ranveer Gulati (Anil Goutam) sexually assaulted her and then forced her to leave; settling into the Panesar family; her feuds with Ravi, Suki Panesar (Balvinder Sopal) and Nish Panesar (Navin Chowdhry), and her turbulent relationship with Ravi. In 2026, in Ravi's absence, Priya begins an affair with her boss, Max Branning (Jake Wood), who is engaged to Cindy Beale (Michelle Collins), and Priya later falls pregnant with his baby, leading to Priya leaving Walford after worrying that Max will take the baby.

== Development ==
=== Introduction and casting ===
On 21 September 2023, the production team for EastEnders announced Sophie Khan Levy and "rising star" Aaliyah James had assumed the roles of Priya Nandra-Hart (Khan Levy) and Avani Nandra-Hart (James) devised in a plot-twist surrounding established character Ravi Gulati (Aaron Thiara) discovering a secret and estranged daughter and exploring his former "bittersweet" off-screen relationship with Priya. Priya's backstory prior to joining the show stated Ravi had kept their son Davinder "Nugget" Gulati (Juhaim Rasul Choudhury) from Priya dating back to their "bitter split years ago". Ravi was unaware Priya had left pregnant and the bombshell would "send shockwaves through his entire world". Khan Levy was delighted at her casting, she stated in a report from her casting announcement: "I'm super excited to be joining the show, and I can't wait to see what trouble Priya gets herself into! I watched EastEnders when I was growing up, so to see so many familiar faces and to walk onto the set is a dream come true."

EastEnders producer Chris Clenshaw teased the arrival of Priya and Avani. He added his excitement of "two women guaranteed to cause big drama in Albert Square". He noted that whilst little was known of their "doomed romance", Priya was "a big missing piece" of Ravi's past. Speaking of the revelation itself, Clenshaw said: "The revelation that he's got another child will floor Ravi, and he is set to face a big challenge in his life when he is forced to cope with such a big shock to the system. We're delighted to welcome Sophie and Aaliyah to the EastEnders family." When reflecting on filming her first scenes, Khan Levy described it as a "whirlwind" to the extreme point of not remembering whether she was nervous. Khan Levy praised actress Lacey Turner (Stacey Slater) for making her feel extremely comfortable and called Turner a pro. She told Inside Soap she started filming a week after auditioning for Priya, adding she had "little time to think". Khan Levy also claimed she had a lot of fun with Priya's dressing-up box. She added that the outfits provided for Priya take a lot of building up and confidence to wear. Khan Levy's favourite shoes were Priya's notable Timberland's and Priya has a good selection of jackets whilst joking that Priya "thinks she is J Lo". Priya made her debut in episode 6789, originally broadcast on 16 October 2023.

=== Notable relationships ===
==== Ravi Gulati ====
Prior to her introduction, tabloids referred to Priya's character as Ravi's "long-lost love".

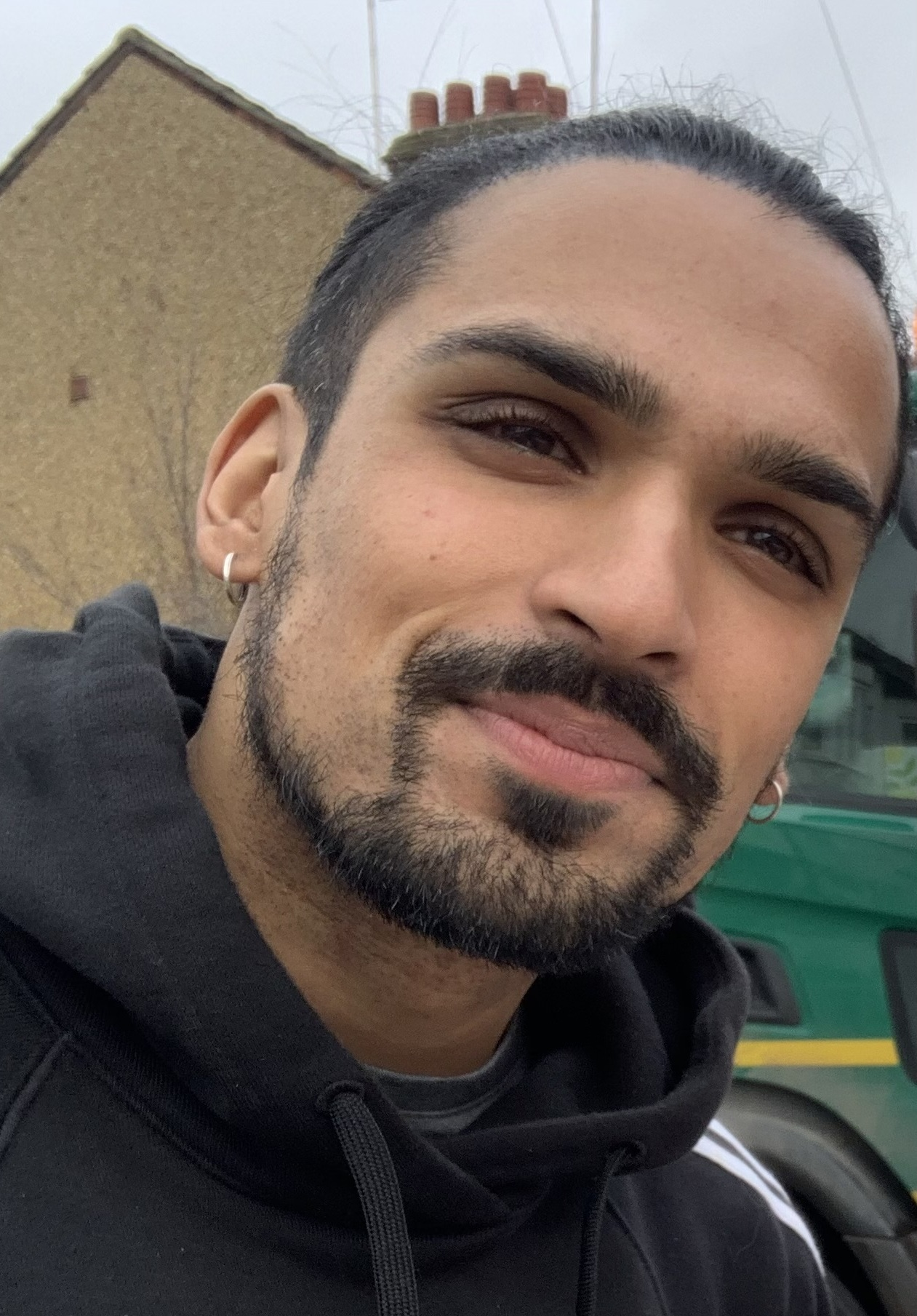
Priya and Avani were created as part of an extension onto Ravi Gulati's (Aaron Thiara) backstory.

The production team for EastEnders initially hinted at a possible reconciliation for the two in March 2024, after adding that there is "history to be revisited". The adoptive-father of Ravi, Ranveer Gulati (Anil Goutam), had run Priya out after sexually assaulting her. Khan Levy asserted that a lot of history remains in the pair, it is just unseen as of yet. Thiara agreed with Khan Levy – scenes showing Priya and new love-interest Martin would let viewers see there is "unfinished business". Thiara conveyed his opinions on the matter: "As a fan there's a level of intrigue about them isn't there, and if we uncover and unpick that history slowly and give that excitement to the fans, that would be a lot of fun. There was a moment a few months ago with Ravi, when Priya made a pass at Nish. Ravi shrugged it off a bit because they were not together, and he was like she's her own woman, do what you want. If things did progress then he might react differently." The subject once again came to life in June 2024 after Thiara teased a potential reunion for the both. Speaking to Inside Soap, Thiara explained that the both "could be a great team" and his thought on rekindling their relationship would grant them to be a "power-couple". He added they both know how to play dirty and manipulating, they "do it in different ways". He continued on the matter: "It's that level of intrigue where you're rooting for these two characters to team up — but they can't seem to see it themselves! If they do come together, I think it would be very interesting to watch." Khan Levy told Inside Soap that Priya and Ravi would grow closer over the period of Nugget falling ill to his over usage of anabolic steroids.

==== Nish Panesar ====
A relationship with Priya and Nish was foreshadowed, along with fans predicting an affair between her and Nish. A 'sex scandal' was 'confirmed' for the two characters in a report on 22 October 2023, only eight days after her initial debut. A scene featured Nish and Priya passionately kissing after Priya encouraged him for it shows them caught by Suki and Vinny Panesar (Shiv Jalota). Chowdhry teased a feud with Priya and told Daily Mirror: "Priya is a wonderful asset to have on-side but my goodness, what a formidable opponent she could be if it goes the other way. That is something that may or may not be tested." Nish returns after months away, revealing he is dying. Priya doesn't take the news lightly, leading to her arguing with Nish regarding her loyalty not extending to woman-abusers. Catching onto Suki and Vinny's plans for Vinny to be the sole inheritor, Priya threatens to destroy it in favour of her children, Nugget and Avani. The plot thickened with Nish offering a "mysterious new deal" with Priya. Khan Levy spoken out on Priya's thinking behind striking a deal with Nish, she stated: "Priya's a scrapper, and ferocious about making sure that Nugget and Avani are taken care of. She's a woman who has had a tough life, and in the past, I'm sure she's got into situations where she's had to grit her teeth and bear things for survival. In this moment, all Priya can see is what's right in front of her – and she believes that even if her kids can't see that she's doing what she's doing for them, they will later when they have their inheritance." The deal was later confirmed to be Nish would pay Priya for her company throughout his last months. Nugget later watches Nish and Priya kissing through the window, before collapsing to the floor.

==== Kat Slater ====
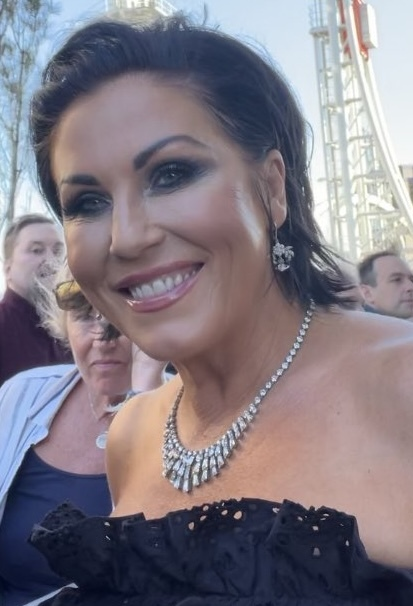
Priya embarked on a feud with Kat Mitchell (Jessie Wallace) over her relationship with Nish Panesar (Navin Chowdhry).

Priya embarks on a feud with long-standing character Kat Mitchell (Jessie Wallace) after she enters a relationship with Nish. They row in public on many occasions — Priya fumbles Kat and Suki's plans to ruin Nish. Nish later attacks Kat in his own home in a "sinister twist" that would see Nish's evil side be exposed to Kat after she threatens his businesses after she realises his intentions to scam her out of the Slater/Mitchell family businesses. When asked if she enjoyed going "head to head" with Wallace, Khan Levy conveyed she "had a bit of a 'pinch me' moment". She added Wallace is brilliant and mentioned that Kat has a lot more front than Priya. She positively expressed the experience and Wallace for pushing her to the limit and stepping out of her comfort zone.

==== Martin Fowler ====
It was confirmed on 13 March 2024 by EastEnders that a new romance between Martin Fowler (James Bye) and newcomer Priya would appear on-screen in the following weeks. The plot would develop as Martin discovers the truth about Stacey Slater's (Lacey Turner) affair with Jack Branning (Scott Maslen). The first date goes well, and the pair continue to playfully flirt until Avani's school notify Priya of her truancy. Martin helps Priya find Avani, much to her dismay. She plans to get Ravi and Priya back together. They both arrange a second date: Avani meddles in the situation, and arranges for Ravi and Martin to meet her at the same time. The scene that showed Martin confused over Ravi's arrival with the same flowers and assuming that Priya wanted to explore polyamory garnered attention on Twitter. Their last date was ruined by Avani, who could not resist making comments calling Martin "daddy" and then intentionally spilling water on his lap, playing it off as an accident.

=== Nugget's steroid revelation ===
"She's got no level of medical knowledge so she immediately catastrophises the situation. Priya goes straight to the worst-case scenario and thinks she will lose Nugget, so she's on her knees in devastation."

— Khan Levy discussing Priya's reaction to Nugget's diagnosis.

Nugget is drawn into anabolic steroids by his friend Denzel Danes (Jaden Ladega). The pair contract muscle dysmorphia and Nugget goes to the extreme of overdosing, needing long-term dialysis. Tommy Moon (Sonny Kendall) rips into Nugget for his appearance. Tommy and Nugget end up in a physical fight leading to Ravi and Zack Hudson (James Farrar) breaking it up. Khan Levy spoken out numerously on the storyline.

On Priya's reaction to finding out the news, Khan Levy told Inside Soap: "It's a total shock because what's going on with Nugget isn't on Priya's radar at all. She's missed it completely, and that makes her feel incredibly guilty. She's already living with a lot of guilt about missing so much of her son's life, so to have missed this when she was actually there is even more devastating." Priya feels guilty for her absence in Nugget's life. Khan Levy teased "chaos" for the family, also teasing a "big fall out". She added, "Priya had absolutely no idea that any of this was coming and I think given her history as a mum who was absent in his life, it's probably very difficult to see her having been absent in this storyline not knowing anything. She's devastated and I think we see the fall out of this in the weeks to come."

== Storylines ==
Davinder "Nugget" Gulati (Juhaim Rasul Choudhury) reconnects with Priya off-screen after his step-grandmother Suki Panesar (Balvinder Sopal) reveals that his father Ravi Gulati (Aaron Thiara) had murdered his adoptive grandfather Ranveer Gulati (Anil Goutam). Nugget makes contact with Suki to bring food to an apartment in Brixton. Suki eventually leads Ravi, Nish Panesar (Navin Chowdhry) and Jack Branning (Scott Maslen) to Nugget, where it is revealed he is staying with Priya. Priya refuses to let Nugget leave as she accuses the Panesars of neglect, but they all go back to Albert Square. After failing to convince Nugget to come back, the Panesars descend into an argument. Avani Nandra-Hart (Aaliyah James) arrives on Albert Square and Priya delivers Ravi the bombshell that Avani is his estranged daughter. The next day, Priya and Avani arrive in Walford after being evicted. Nish offers to let them stay. She later reveals to Ravi after arguing in the kitchen that she was sexually assaulted and paid off to leave Ravi and Nugget by Ranveer. Storming out, she later has a one-night stand with Peter Beale (Thomas Law) after meeting in Peggy's wine bar. Priya attempts to kiss Nish after seeing Suki has no affection for him, although Suki is having an affair with Eve Unwin (Heather Peace), unbeknownst to both Priya and Nish. Suki catches Priya and Nish in the act, along with son Vinny Panesar (Shiv Jalota), and writes a letter to inform Nish she is leaving him. Priya finds the letter and blackmails Suki for £3,000. Nish catches Suki handing over the money and briefly fires Priya from the shop. Prior to Christmas Day, Nish discovers the affair between Suki and Eve. He is attacked by The Six and is left to die (see "The Six"). When released from hospital, Priya collects him and nurses him back to health. Priya encourages him to move on – she learns of Nish's relationship with Kat Mitchell (Jessie Wallace) and Priya encourages him to invite her on a date.

Avani stirs up trouble when she picks fun at Denzel Danes (Jaden Ladega) for being beaten up by Logan (Liam Hatch) and failing to protect Yolande Trueman (Angela Wynter) who significantly injured herself in the process of defending Denzel. It is all caught on video which Avani plays, causing Denzel to smash her phone. Defending his sister in the process, Nugget and Denzel end up in a fight. It is revealed by Will Mitchell (Freddie Phillips) that he is buying e-cigarettes from Avani. Will's mother Honey Mitchell (Emma Barton) confronts Priya in The Queen Vic but Priya makes it worse by attempting to fight Honey, unapologetic for Avani's behaviour. Priya begins a romance with Martin Fowler (James Bye) after they have a date in Peggy's wine bar. Their blossoming romance is interrupted by Avani who wants Priya and Ravi to reunite. Avani, in a bid to ruin their date, makes inappropriate comments about Martin and spills water on his lap. After being excommunicated by his family, Nish returns and reveals that he is terminally ill with viral myocarditis. Priya becomes suspicious when Suki, Eve and Vinny start making amends with Nish, and believes that they are scheming to inherit his assets when he dies. Priya also decides to conduct her own plan to inherit Nish's wealth, but he sees through her. After purchasing items online using Suki's credit card, Avani urges Priya to keep her act together for the sake of keeping a roof over their head. Priya, listening to Avani's advice, offers Nish a proposal. She offers to accompany him throughout his dying last months for enough money to secure her and her children's futures. Nish initially declines but after seeing Suki and Eve embrace, he is desperate to make Suki jealous. Priya and Nish passionately kiss, but are watched outside of a window by Nugget. Nugget collapses and is taken to hospital. It is revealed that he has a steroid addiction after contracting muscle dysmorphia. Priya and Ravi accuse each other of not looking after Nugget, and they decide to become better parents. Soon after, Priya turns Nish down and after Nugget confronts Nish by threatening to expose their kiss, Nish lies to Ravi that Priya had slept with him for his money. Ravi accuses Priya of being a bad mother and decides to put Nugget and Avani in his care. As part of his plan to gain Nish's trust and take his money, Vinny evicts Priya from the Panesar house, and she lodges with Martin and Zack Hudson (James Farrar). Priya fails to reconcile with Nugget and Avani, who have disowned her due to Nish's manipulation. She decides to get revenge on Nish by luring him to the Minute Mart, handcuffing him, and demanding that he films a video taking back his lie that they slept together. However, her plan is interrupted by Ravi, and this strains her relationship with Nugget and Avani. She eventually begins to reconcile with the pair after saving Nugget and Denzel's friendship and helping Avani after her first relationship proves unsuccessful; she later provides them with emotional support when Nish is arrested for the murder of Keanu Taylor (Danny Walters).

In December 2024, Priya accompanies Ravi and their children to the prison hospital when Nish's condition begins to deteriorate (unaware that this is a ruse orchestrated by the prison doctor). Nish ultimately escapes prison and successfully evades capture with the help of Nugget. When Nish is presumed dead, Priya is the only member of the family to openly celebrate (unaware Nish has faked his death with Nugget's help). Priya organises Suki and Eve's hen party and attends the wedding the next day, ultimately witnessing Nish and Suki falling from the hotel balcony, killing Nish and severely injuring Suki; Priya ultimately helps Nugget destroy the evidence of him helping Nish by cleaning out the apartment for finger prints.

Ravi and Priya share a kiss, but she finds out Ravi is in a relationship with Denise Fox (Diane Parish). Priya teams up with Cindy Beale (Michelle Collins) who pays her to manipulate Cindy’s ex-husband Ian Beale (Adam Woodyatt) into retrieving a locket from him which Cindy believes he stole from her after attacking her on Christmas Day 2024, and also to make Ravi jealous. However Ian finds out about the scheme and pays Priya double what Cindy is paying her to find out what he wants. After Ravi and Denise split up, he and Priya get back together in August 2025. Avani begins struggling after being strip searched by the police after being wrongly arrested for possession of drugs. She has sex with Joel Marshall (Max Murray), who films their encounter without Avani's consent. Avani becomes pregnant, and Suki attempts to manipulate her into not having an abortion, so she and Eve can adopt her baby, though Eve eventually takes Avani for the abortion. Priya is infuriated when she finds out Suki had manipulated Avani, and the family move out into their own house, funded by Ravi's drug dealing.

In January 2026, Ravi is spiked by Nicola Mitchell (Laura Doddington), and the subsequent hallucinations lead him to violently attack Nugget, leaving him in a coma. Nugget develops epilepsy and has no memory of the attack, and Priya and Ravi keep Ravi's involvement secret, though a devastated Nugget eventually finds out the truth. In April 2026, Priya does her level best to support Ravi, whose drug dealing and subsequent working as an informant have led to a severe mental health crisis. He writes her a letter, but Priya is unaware of the letter with his definite plans to separate. On Ravi's return to the square, having been sectioned for a few weeks after a suicide attempt, he sleeps with Priya but then finishes things with her and moves out, leaving her heartbroken. She drunkenly flirts with her boss Max Branning (Jake Wood), after his proposal had been rejected by Cindy, and the two have sex. Later, Cindy accepts Max's proposal, and the two get engaged. However, Max cannot resist Priya's advances and the two continue their intimacy, leading to an affair. Priya forms an unlikely friendship with Jean Slater (Gillian Wright), who warns her to stay away from Max. Priya reconciles with Ravi, accepting his proposal but later finds out she is pregnant, and is unsure whether the father is Max or Ravi. When Ravi discovers Priya and Max's affair, he takes Max to the Boxing Den and beats him up. Priya intervenes and tells Ravi about her pregnancy, allowing him to believe that the baby is his. Jean accidentally reveals the affair to Cindy on her and Max's wedding day, and a furious Cindy finds out about the baby. When Cindy threatens the expose the baby's paternity, Priya decides to leave Walford for Leeds, after confessing to Ravi that he is not the father.

== Reception ==
Laura Denby of Radio Times speculated "newcomer Priya" could be the "potential seventh woman" in the most recent "whodunit" storyline "The Six". Inside Soap branded Khan Levy's character as "Naughty Priya" whilst also adding her actions are questionable. On the decision to pair Priya with Martin Fowler (James Bye), Maisie Spackman from Metro wondered if Martin and Priya were set to become the square's new power-couple. Spackman also cited Priya as "fiery". The scene displaying Martin assuming Priya wanted to explore polyamory with Ravi was noted to have left fans "in hysterics", with multiple users on the social media platform Twitter commenting about it after garnering a lot of attention. For Khan Levy's portrayal of Priya, she was nominated for the "Best Newcomer" accolade at the Inside Soap Awards 2024.
