= Zack Hudson =

Fictional character from EastEnders

- EastEnders character
- Portrayed by: James Farrar
- Duration: 2021–present
- First appearance: Episode 6237; 16 March 2021
- Introduced by: Jon Sen
In-universe information
- Occupation: Personal trainer Barman; Chef
- Father: Gavin Sullivan
- Stepmother: Kathy Beale
- Half-sisters: Sharon Watts
- Sons: Barney Mitchell
- Daughters: Peach; Dolly Dean-Hudson
- Adoptive sons: Ashton (foster); Tommy Moon (foster)
- Adoptive daughters: Britney Wainwright (foster)
- Grandmothers: Ivy Sullivan
- Aunts: Margaret Midhurst; Sally Sullivan
- Nephews: Dennis Rickman Jnr; Albie Watts
- Other relatives: Alyssa Lennox

Zack Hudson is a fictional character from the BBC soap opera EastEnders, played by James Farrar. He first appears in episode 6237, originally broadcast on 16 March 2021.The character and Farrar's casting details were announced on 31 January 2021. Zack is initially introduced as the secret son of Gavin Sullivan (Paul Nicholas) and the half-brother of established character Sharon Watts (Letitia Dean).

Zack's storylines have included a tumultuous relationship with Nancy Carter (Maddy Hill) and a feud with her father Mick Carter (Danny Dyer), a fling with Sam Mitchell (Kim Medcalf), learning that he has HIV, losing daughter Peach with Whitney Dean (Shona McGarty), and then deciding to foster after struggling with the initial thought of raising a child that is not his own. He later takes on legal responsibility for his on-screen nephew Albie Watts (Arthur Gentleman) and Britney Wainwright (Lola Campbell) - albeit illegally. Zack later cheats on Whitney with Lauren Branning (Jacqueline Jossa), causing her to leave Walford with their daughter Dolly. In 2025, he discovered that he was the father of Barney Mitchell (Lewis Bridgeman) following an affair with Nicola Mitchell (Laura Doddington) sixteen years earlier behind the back of her husband Teddy (Roland Manookian) when he was her fitness instructor.

== Development ==
=== Introduction and backstory ===
Zack is introduced as the son of Gavin Sullivan (Paul Nicholas) and half-brother of established character Sharon Watts (Letitia Dean), although this is embargoed until his first appearance. The character is billed as a "unpredictable troublemaker who lives life in the fast lane". He is described as "forever the ladies' man" and Jon Sen, the show's executive producer, called him a "charming rogue". Farrar noted that Zack becomes a "heartthrob" who causes tension with the Carter family. The character's backstory states that he experienced a challenging childhood which gave him attachment issues and turned him into a "lone wolf". Farrar expressed his delight at joining EastEnders and hoped to bring his experience as "a born and bred Londoner" to the role. He liked Zack's backstory and commented, "there is a real depth to him that I can't wait to explore." He found the role of Zack different to other roles he has portrayed. Sen dubbed Farrar "a wonderful addition" and teased that "trouble is always just round the corner" for Zack.

Farrar began filming in February 2021, while the show was produced under socially distanced filming restrictions. Consequently, his wife was hired to be a stand-in for any scenes requiring actors to be closer than two metres. Zack is introduced to the soap at Gavin's funeral, where he makes a "scathing toast" and is chased out by Gavin's cousins. He catches up with Sharon and Kathy Beale (Gillian Taylforth) afterwards, where he reveals he is Gavin's son. Zack later visits Albert Square, where Sharon lives, to build a relationship with her. Farrar explained that Zack wants to support Sharon, which he related to, having come from a family of "very strong women". However, Zack struggles not to cause problems for them. Farrar confirmed that he had been involved in five stunts in his first few weeks of filming.

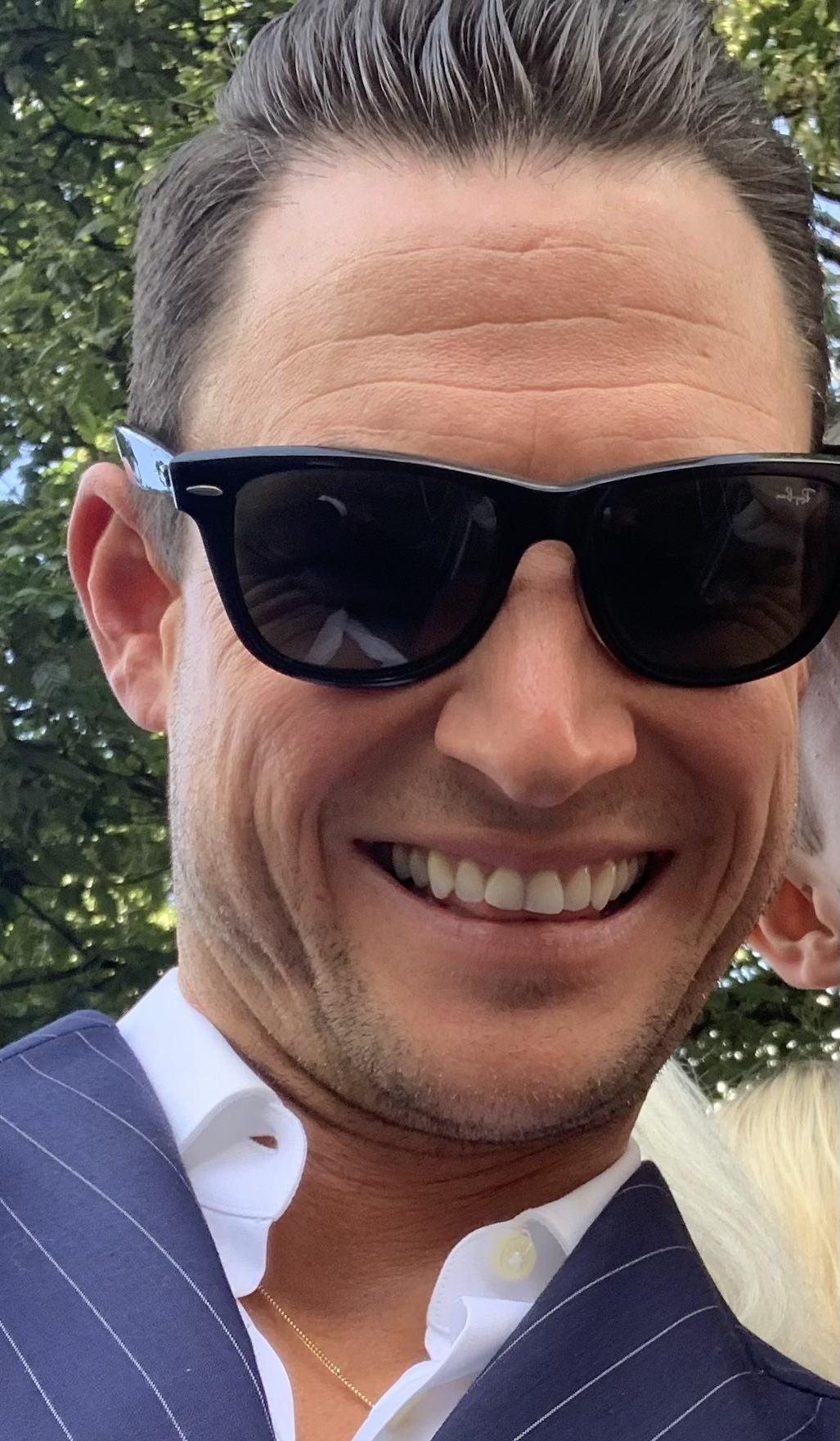
James Farrar, who portrays Zack.

=== HIV ===
In January 2023, it was announced that Zack would be at the centre of an issue-led storyline when he discovered that he was HIV-positive. The storyline begins when a face from Zack's past, Brett Nelson, played by former Hollyoaks actor Fabrizio Santino, arrives in Walford in search of employment at the local gym. On the storyline, executive producer Chris Clenshaw addressed, "EastEnders has never shied away from covering sensitive issues and Zack's story is one of these. There are so many myths and disinformation surrounding HIV, so working closely with Terrence Higgins Trust has enabled us to really understand what it is like for those that are diagnosed with HIV and we hope that this storyline will bring more awareness of HIV and what it is like to live with the virus in 2023". The storyline also covers HIV and pregnancy, as Zack is diagnosed with the virus shortly after impregnating Whitney Dean (Shona McGarty). On this, Dr. Kate Nembiar from Terrence Higgins Trust added, "All pregnant people are offered an HIV test to reduce the number of babies born with the virus. Thanks to this and the incredible treatment advances, vertical HIV transmission rarely happens in the UK now. People living with HIV do give birth to HIV negative children. If someone who is pregnant tests positive for HIV, they'll be advised to start treatment straight away. This is a crucial way to prevent the virus being transmitted to the baby during pregnancy or birth."

== Storylines ==
Zack attends Gavin Sullivan's (Paul Nicholas) cremation and at the wake, he raises a scathing toast to Gavin and is chased by his cousins. Zack hides out in Kathy Beale (Gillian Taylforth) and Sharon Watts' (Letitia Dean) car until the coast is clear and when Sharon asks about his identity, he tells her that Gavin was his father. Zack later arrives in Walford after receiving a call from Sharon's friend, Jean Slater (Gillian Wright). He reveals he has nowhere to live and has been sleeping his car. He is then rude to Jay Brown (Jamie Borthwick) and Kheerat Panesar (Jaz Deol). Zack tells Sharon about his abusive childhood with Gavin, detailing how he hit him and Sharon tells him he did the same thing to her son Dennis Rickman Jnr (Bleu Landau). Zack then takes Sharon's keys and sneaks into her flat looking for something but is caught by Sharon. Zack tells her that he is looking for a safety deposit box, left to Sharon in Gavin's will, which Gavin left him the key for. Sharon accuses Zack of being like Gavin and he says he is nothing like their father. They then agree to share whatever is in the box. Zack opens it and is enraged to find a birthday card he made for Gavin as a child and little else of value. He throws the box on the floor, frightening Sharon. Zack tells Sharon about a time when he baked Gavin some cakes at school but he was unappreciative and stubbed out his cigarette in one, leaving him humiliated. As he goes to leave, Sharon tells him that Dennis died the previous year and asks Zack to stay, to which he initially refuses, although returns later with food and wine for them both. Zack finds himself on the wrong side of Martin Fowler (James Bye), who punches him when he believes that he has been sleeping with his wife Ruby Allen (Louisa Lytton). He later becomes friends with Martin and starts working as a barman at The Queen Victoria public house.

Zack starts dating Nancy Carter (Maddy Hill) and also flirts with her half-sister Frankie Lewis (Rose Ayling-Ellis). He gives Frankie driving lessons and in one of the lessons, he stops off at the Queen Vic to have a drink and continues. Zack resumes flirting with Frankie and winds her up, causing her to take her eyes off the road. They are involved in a hit-and-run accident, in which Nancy gets hit by the car. Zack persuades Frankie to cover up the accident but it proves too daunting for her and she confesses to Nancy's father Mick (Danny Dyer). Mick agrees to hide it from Nancy and warns Zack away. However he cannot resist and continues to see Nancy, keeping it a secret from Mick. Whilst upstairs in The Queen Vic, Nancy's mother Linda (Kellie Bright) is threatened by burglars who attempt to steal money, but Zack stands up to them and they leave. Mick discovers that Zack is sleeping with Nancy, but he ignores Mick's threats to leave her. Zack then admits the truth to Nancy and she subsequently ends their relationship. After this, Zack sleeps with Janine Butcher (Charlie Brooks) but realises he loves Nancy and attempts to make amends. When Alyssa is left on Sharon's doorstep, both Zack and Martin believe that they could be her father, however when Alyssa's mother Jada Lennox (Kelsey Calladine-Smith) arrives in Walford, she reveals that Zack's late nephew, Dennis, is Alyssa's father. Jada moves in with Sharon and Zack soon realises that Sharon and her ex-husband Phil Mitchell (Steve McFadden) are planning on battling Jada for custody of Alyssa. He tells Jada and she flees with Alyssa. When Sharon finds out that Zack told Jada about her intentions, she evicts him and he is left homeless. He manages to find Jada and convinces her to return with Alyssa, and they all move into 43 Albert Square with Sharon.

Zack builds his relationship with Nancy, and she supports him when he has the opportunity to participate in a cooking competition, letting him use The Queen Vic's kitchen for practice. They grow closer and resume their relationship. He supports Nancy when she learns that her aunt Tina Carter (Luisa Bradshaw-White) – who is thought to have been on the run – has been murdered by Gray Atkins (Toby-Alexander Smith). Zack and Nancy decide to open a restaurant together, and they meet with Melissa (Hannah Bennett-Fox), who they believe is an investor. Unbeknownst to the both of them, Melissa is working with Janine to swindle the pair, so she can use the money to pay Linda into leaving Walford. Melissa tricks Nancy into transferring money into her account, and they become suspicious when they do not hear back from the investor; they later discover that Nancy has been conned. Zack bonds with Jada and she tries to kiss him, but Zack rebuffs her advances. She lies to Sharon that Zack tried to kiss her, and Sharon threatens to throw Zack out in order for Jada to admit the truth. Jada later admits to Sharon that she lied. During a stormy time with Nancy, Zack drowns his sorrows at the club, where he sleeps with Sam Mitchell (Kim Medcalf). Nancy finds out and after much consideration, she decides to make a fresh start by leaving Walford without Zack, thus ending their relationship. Soon after, Zack and Sam begin a fling and when Sam's ex-boyfriend Don (Nick Nevern) arrives in Walford, she claims that she is pregnant with Zack's child. Sam later reveals that she lied to drive Don away, and when she asks Zack to begin a serious relationship, he turns her down.

Zack becomes close to Whitney Dean (Shona McGarty) and they have a one-night stand. Zack is surprised when Whitney reveals that she is pregnant. At first, Zack does not want to become a father due to his bad experiences with Gavin as a child, but changes his mind, and agrees to support her. He contemplates taking a job as a chef on a cruise ship, but decides to stay when Whitney's friend Chelsea Fox (Zaraah Abrahams) tells him that Whitney needs him to be around. Zack's former friend, Brett Nelson (Fabrizio Santino), arrives in Walford and applies to become a personal trainer at Sharon's gym. Zack is wary of Brett and reveals to Sharon that Brett had previously introduced him to steroids in the past, which led him to be violent and aggressive. Zack tries to warn Brett away but he returns and reveals to Zack that he may have HIV after they shared a needle whilst taking steroids. Zack becomes depressed and pushes Whitney away and tells her that he wants nothing to do with their child. He begins drinking heavily and smashes Peggy's wine bar, cutting his hand in the process. After messing up an opportunity to become a head chef at Walford East, he sees Brett who encourages him to get checked at a sexual health clinic. Zack begrudgingly gets himself checked, and is mortified to discover that he is HIV positive. He tells Brett that he is worried that he may have passed it on to his unborn child. He decides to tell Whitney but is relieved when she reveals that her blood test has been fine. Zack later gives the clinic a list of all the women that he has slept with and they contact them to get checked. Zack and Whitney later lose the baby as it could be born with a dangerously low mortality rate due to omphaloceles, and Zack struggles with the loss of their daughter who they later named Peach. Whitney and Zack slowly discuss plans for other children and they decide to adopt to Zack's initial dismay. Whitney and Zack move into their own apartment and start going through assessments to start fostering. He later takes on legal responsibility for his nephew Albie Watts (Arthur Gentleman) after Sharon cannot trust Keanu Taylor (Danny Walters) to raise Albie alone after a very public bust-up with Peter Beale (Thomas Law). Whitney and Zack foster a young boy named Ashton over Christmas 2023 and struggle when he is moved away. Not long after, Whitney discovers that she is pregnant again.

Whitney and Zack visit her adoptive mother Bianca Jackson (Patsy Palmer) in Milton Keynes. While there, Whitney bonds with twelve-year-old Britney Wainwright (Lola Campbell) and is disgusted to find Britney's mother Keeley Wainwright (Kirsty J Curtis) is a drug addict. Whitney angrily confronts Keeley and is hit by an oncoming car; however, Whitney and the baby are unharmed. Whitney is eager to foster Britney, against Zack's wishes. Whitney pays Keeley several thousand pounds to take care of Britney herself, but keeps this from Zack. She initially tells him that she fostered her legally, and when Zack finds out, Whitney fiercely tells him that she will always put Britney over Zack. Zack then sleeps with Whitney's best friend Lauren Branning (Jacqueline Jossa). Whitney proposes to him at the Queen Vic and Zack accepts. Bianca returns to Walford and finds out that Zack has slept with Lauren and pressures him to tell the truth but he is unable to go through with it. On Whitney's hen night, Lauren and Whitney are locked in a van, and she nearly tells Whitney herself, but Whitney then goes into labour. Bianca rescues the pair, and Whitney gives birth to Dolly Dean-Hudson, but at the hospital, Britney overhears Zack and Lauren talking about their one-night stand. During their wedding ceremony, Britney exposes Zack and Lauren's dalliance. Whitney calls off their wedding and refuses to reconcile with Zack. She then realises that she has wasted her whole life relying on men and plans to make a fresh start as a single mum to Britney and Dolly by moving to Wakefield. When Zack asks Whitney if he can see Dolly again, she promises to allow this, assuring him that he will be a great father, and allows him to say goodbye to Dolly.

Zack mentors teenagers in boxing at the Boxing Den. He later discovers that Denzel Danes (Jaden Ladega) has been taking steroids and has provided them to Ravi's son Davinder "Nugget" Gulati (Juhaim Rasul Choudhury), who overdoses. Zack encourages Denzel to confess. Zack moves in with Martin and temporarily fosters Tommy Moon (Sonny Kendall). When Martin is killed in the Queen Vic Explosion, Zack supports a grieving Sharon whilst dealing with his grief. He agrees to help conceal Sharon's one-night stand with Grant Mitchell (Ross Kemp) from her current partner and Grant's cousin, Teddy Mitchell (Roland Manookian), but they are overheard by Teddy's son, Barney (Lewis Bridgeman). Zack confronts Barney to try and keep him silent but Barney collapses from wounds he sustained during the explosion; when the paramedics arrive, Zack realises that he is Barney's biological father due to their matching blood types and his previous affair with Teddy's then-wife, Nicola Mitchell (Laura Doddington). Nicola confirms this and has Zack beaten up to prevent him from revealing the truth. Zack tells Sharon about Barney's paternity - Nicola and Sharon agree to keep each other's secrets, but Barney reveals Sharon's infidelity to Teddy, resulting in a confrontation between the couple; Zack steps in to defend Sharon but is violently beaten by Teddy. Afterwards, Nicola warns Zack and Sharon not to inform Teddy of Barney's parentage by alleging that Teddy murdered their son Harry's (Elijah Holloway) girlfriend Shireen Bashar; it soon transpires that Nicola is the true killer. Zack still attempts to bond with Barney by helping him at the gym; Nicola responds by sabotaging these attempts and firing Zack from the wine bar.

Shireen's body is soon discovered, and Teddy and Nicola successfully frame Benji Haynes (Carl Prekopp) for the crime. Zack confronts Nicola, who confesses that she murdered Shireen - and threatens to do the same to Whitney and Zack. Horrified, Zack arranges for Whitney and Dolly to go into hiding with him in Inverness but soon concludes that Barney isn't safe with the Mitchells, and makes plans to flee Walford with him. Zack reports Nicola to the police for Shireen's murder - she is soon released without charge, and informs Harry of her guilt and Barney's parentage in the hopes that Harry can persuade Barney to follow him. Harry refuses to allow this to happen and attacks Zack before driving him into the countryside in Teddy's car; he is stopped by Teddy, his half-brother Billy Mitchell (Perry Fenwick), Billy's wife Honey Mitchell (Emma Barton) and Nigel Bates (Paul Bradley). Teddy places an unconscious Zack in the front seat of the car and begins to drive back to Walford; however, Zack regains consciousness and attempts to grab the wheel, resulting in the car driving off a bridge and crashing into a lake. Teddy escapes the wreckage, but Zack is nowhere to be found, leading the group to believe he has drowned. Zack ultimately survives and returns to Walford that night and discovers Barney now knows the truth - having been told by Sharon's half-sister Vicki Fowler (Alice Haig). Zack attempts to convince Barney to flee Walford with him, explaining Nicola's crimes, but is ultimately devastated when Barney decides to remain with the Mitchells. However, Barney informs Zack that he is open to forming a relationship. Zack turns to Lauren, and they kiss, which almost ruins her relationship with Peter Beale.

== Reception ==
For his portrayal of Zack, Farrar won the Best Newcomer accolade at the 2021 Digital Spy Reader Awards.
