= The Christmas Truce (play) =

2014 British play staged by the Royal Shakespeare Company

- Written by: Phil Porter
- Setting: Western Front, Christmas 1914

Premiere
- Date: 29 November 2014
- Place: Royal Shakespeare Theatre, Stratford-upon-Avon

The Christmas Truce is a play by Phil Porter based on the true events during the First World War.

== Production history ==
The play was produced by the Royal Shakespeare Company and premiered in the Royal Shakespeare Theatre in Stratford-upon-Avon for the Christmas 2014 season, 100 years after the events. The play opened on 29 November 2014 (with a press night on 9 December) running until 31 January 2015 and was directed by Erica Whyman.

During the development of the play, the RSC hosted a drop-in event encouraging the relatives of those who fought in the First World War to share stories, photos and letters at the Royal Shakespeare Company in March 2014.

== Cast ==
=== Royal Shakespeare Company (2014 cast) ===
- Joseph Kloska as Capt Bruce Bairnsfather
- Gerard Horan as Old Bill
- Sam Alexander
- Peter Basham
- William Belchambers
- Nick Haverson
- Tunji Kasim
- Sophie Khan Levy
- Oliver Lynes
- Emma Manton
- Chris McCalphy
- Peter McGovern
- Frances McNamee
- Chris Nayak
- Jamie Newall
- Roderick Smith
- Flora Spencer-Longhurst
- Harry Waller
- Thomas Wheatley
- Leah Whitaker
