= Matthew James Morrison =

English actor (born 1992)

- Born: 22 June 1992 (age 33); Mansfield, Nottinghamshire, England
- Occupation: Actor
- Years active: 2012–present
- Known for: Boy Meets Boy; EastEnders

Matthew James Morrison (born 22 June 1992) is an English actor. After joining the National Youth Theatre, he went on to appear in numerous short films. He co-starred in the film Boy Meets Boy (2021) and portrayed the role of Felix Baker in the BBC soap opera EastEnders from 2022 to 2025.

== Life and career ==
Matthew James Morrison was born on 22 June 1992 in Mansfield, Nottinghamshire. As a child, he would perform with the local church as well as appearing in school productions and was a member of the Nottingham Playhouse Youth Theatre. He eventually relocated to London, and joined the National Youth Theatre and National Youth Film Academy. He also attended the Queen Mary University of London, graduating with a BSc and an MSc in Mathematics. He made his film debut in Let the Die Be Cast: Initium in 2014 and went on to appear as French serial killer Thierry Paulin in an episode of World's Most Evil Killers in 2017. Morrison has also appeared in various advertisements for companies including Duracell, Samsung and Hyundai.

In 2021, Morrison co-starred in the German film Boy Meets Boy, in which he portrayed Harry. In June 2022, Morrison was announced to be joining the cast of the BBC soap opera EastEnders as Felix Baker. The character is introduced as the son of Avery Baker (Omar Lye-Fook), alongside his brother Finlay Baker (Ashley Byam). It was also announced that Felix had a drag alter ego, "Tara Misu", and would ultimately become the first drag queen to appear as a regular character in a soap opera, of which Morrison said it was a "privilege to showcase the creative art of drag" [...] and to "represent the LGBTQIA+ community". Morrison's character appeared in the soap sporadically, allowing him to embark on other projects. He has since appeared in the short films The Painter & Poet (2022), Upon the Edge (2022), Nothing Special (2023) and The Space You Need (2025).

== Filmography ==
Year	Title	Role	Notes
2014	Let the Die Be Cast: Initium	The Male Servant	Film role
2018	World's Most Evil Killers	Thierry Paulin	Episode: "Thierry Paulin"
2018	Youth Condemn	Aaron	Short film
2018	I'd Rather Not	Nippers	Short film
2019	The Devils Harmony	Philips	Short film
2019	The Long Ride	Zack	Short film
2021	Boy Meets Boy	Harry	Film role
2021	Cactus	—N/a	Short film
2021	Pray	—N/a	Short film
2022	Upon the Edge	Max	Short film
2022–2025	EastEnders	Felix Baker	Regular role
2022	The Painter & Poet	Husband	Short film
2023	Nothing Special	Gabriel	Short film
2025	The Space You Need	Leo	Short film

== Stage ==
- Leave It Be (2012)
- The Virtuous Burglar (2013)
- The Pitchfork Disney (2014)
- Houseplay (2015)
- Much Ado About Nothing (2017)
- Silent Meat (2019–2020)
- The Importance of Being Earnest (2021)
- All That (2021)
- Blue/Orange (2025)
- Glorious! (2026)

== Awards and nominations ==
Year	Ceremony	Award	Work	Result	Ref.
2022	Digital Spy Reader Awards	Best Newcomer	EastEnders	Nominated	
