= Code of a Killer =

Three-part British television series

- Opening title
- Genre: Docudrama
- Created by: Michael Crompton
- Based on: Sir Alec Jeffreys' discovery of DNA fingerprinting
- Written by: Michael Crompton
- Directed by: James Strong
- Starring: David Threlfall; John Simm; Anna Madeley; Jaz Deol; Lorcan Cranitch; Andrew Tiernan
- Composer: Glenn Gregory (credited as Glen Gregory)
- Country of origin: United Kingdom
- Original language: English
- No. of series: 1
- No. of episodes: 2 (as aired); 3 (streaming)

Production
- Executive producer: Simon Heath
- Producer: Priscilla Parish
- Cinematography: Matt Gray BSC
- Running time: 2 x 65 minutes (as aired); 3 x 45 minutes (streaming)
- Production company: World Productions

Original release
- Network: ITV
- Release: 6 April – 13 April 2015

Code of a Killer is a three-part British police drama television series which tells the true story of Alec Jeffreys' discovery of DNA fingerprinting and its introductory use by Detective David Baker in catching the double murderer Colin Pitchfork. Filming commenced in late September 2014, and the programme aired on the ITV network, on 6 and 13 April 2015. Endemol Shine handled international distribution of the series.

== Plot ==
Set over a nearly four-year period from 1983 to 1987, DCS David Baker leads an investigation into the vicious murders of the two Leicestershire teenage schoolgirls, Lynda Mann and Dawn Ashworth. Meanwhile, Alec Jeffreys is an ambitious scientist who has recently discovered a remarkable method to read a person's DNA and, from it, generate a unique DNA fingerprint. Convinced one local person committed both crimes, Baker approaches Jeffreys to utilise his scientific technique to solve the murders. The first-ever DNA manhunt follows, involving the blood testing of many men — all in the aid of catching the killer.

== Cast ==
- John Simm as Alec Jeffreys
- Anna Madeley as Sue Jeffreys
- David Threlfall as DCS David Baker
- Lorcan Cranitch as DI Alan Madden
- Jaz Deol as DC Taran Kholi
- Andrew Tiernan as DS Geoff Taylor
- Robert Glenister as DCC Chapman
- Lydia Rose Bewley as Vicky Wilson
- Farzana Dua Elahe as Tania Patel
- Paul Copley as Sidney Jeffreys
- Ged Simmons as Eddie Eastwood
- Shirley Dixon as Joan Jeffreys
- Hannah Walters as Kath Eastwood
- Dorothy Atkinson as Barbara Ashworth
- Nathan Wright as Colin Pitchfork
- Adam Nagaitis as Ian Whenby
- Jessica Woods as Carole Pitchfork
- Neil Edmond as Robin Ashworth
- Darren Bancroft as Mr. Hopkirk

== Production ==
=== Development ===
Code of a Killer was commissioned by ITV's Director of Drama Steve November and Controller of Drama Victoria Fea on 16 May 2014. The series was developed with the participation of retired Professor Sir Alec Jeffreys and former Detective Chief Superintendent David Baker. It was written by Michael Crompton, directed by James Strong, produced by Priscilla Parish, and executive produced by Simon Heath for World Productions. Filming began in late September 2014, and the episodes were shown on 6 and 13 April 2015 at 9:00 p.m. on the ITV network.

== Broadcast ==
The series premiered in Australia on BBC First on 19 September 2015.

== Episodes ==
Originally aired in 2015 in the UK and Australia as two 65-minute episodes; currently streams online as three 45-minute episodes plus one 28-minute ‘Behind the Scenes’ special. The episode descriptions below are for the (current) thee-episode format, while air dates and viewership data apply to the (original) two-episode format.

No.	Title	Directed by	Written by	Original release date	UK viewers (millions) (Note: Sourced by BARB; includes ITV HD and ITV +1)
1	"Episode One"	James Strong	Michael Crompton	6 April 2015	7.44
In late 1983, in a small village outside Leicester, 15-year-old Lynda Mann is raped and strangled. A year on, after an exhaustive but fruitless search for her killer, Detective Chief Superintendent David Baker is forced to scale down the investigation. Meanwhile, at the University of Leicester, scientist Dr Alec Jeffreys invents a remarkable technique to read DNA (found in every living thing) — and create from it a genetic "fingerprint" unique to the being it came from — something never before achieved. His discovery is first put to use in an immigration case, successfully proving the parentage of a young Ghanaian boy and preventing his deportation. The acceptance of Jeffreys’s findings in a court of law opens the door to DNA testing, and he and his university laboratory are swamped by paternity and immigration cases. Summer 1986, and 15-year-old Dawn Ashworth goes missing — last seen a hundred yards from where Lynda’s body was discovered. The police initiate an intensive search for her. Where is she, and what happened to her?
2	"Episode Two"	James Strong	Michael Crompton	13 April 2015	6.99
Two days after her disappearance, Dawn Ashworth’s body is found hidden in undergrowth — only a few hundred yards from where Lynda’s body was discovered less than three years earlier. Like Lynda, she has been raped and strangled. DCS Baker is back on the case — convinced one man is responsible for both assaults. This time, the investigation bears fruit. A teenager from the area, seen acting suspiciously during the search, confesses to her killing under lengthy police questioning. However, he refuses to admit he had anything to do with Lynda Mann’s death. Reading about Jeffreys’s DNA work in a local paper, Baker approaches him at the university — perhaps this new DNA test can prove the teenager’s involvement in Lynda’s death as well? Jeffreys is hesitant — the DNA sample from that murder scene is nearly three years old, and his technique was not designed for criminal investigation. Furthermore, with the use of such DNA testing in legal cases currently limited to paternity and immigration lawsuits, would such evidence be accepted in a criminal court? Jeffreys proceeds, but his testing shows not only that the teenager did not kill Lynda Mann, but that he wasn’t involved in Dawn’s murder, either — his confession to the police was false. Although this is a huge setback for the investigation, Jeffreys does succeed in generating DNA fingerprints of the (unknown) assailant from both attacks, and the two match each other — confirming Baker’s theory that the same person murdered both girls. To a storm of publicity, the police release the teenage suspect and the world is introduced to forensic DNA analysis. Among area residents there’s a grim realization that a serial murderer remains in their midst — and is likely to strike again. Baker calls together his team, some of whom doubt the new science — believing they’ve now freed a guilty man. Baker tells them to go back to square one: the statements and paperwork from the investigation must be reviewed again. A Crimewatch special is filmed of Dawn’s fateful last journey and an emotional appeal made to the public...but no promising leads come of it. Baker realizes the usual routes of enquiry just aren’t working and comes to believe DNA fingerprinting holds more promise. He proposes to Jeffreys a plan to test every man in the area between ages 18 and 34, seeking a match to the killer’s DNA profile now in evidence. Jeffreys cautiously agrees with the plan in principle. Both men are keenly aware of the high stakes and risk of failure, but also realize that the plan represents the most realistic chance of solving both murders — and of preventing further such attacks. Baker makes a plea to his superiors for the resources needed for mass DNA profiling. Despite the vast expense, in the end the Home Office concede, under pressure from the prime minister. Testing is to be carried out by the Forensic Science Service. Each of the roughly 5,000 men within the target group is to receive an official letter of invitation — though, to protect civil liberties, it is agreed that their participation must be voluntary. Yet, for the program to succeed, it will need the community’s acceptance and for nearly all the men in the group to give a blood sample. Will this large-scale "experiment" succeed in tracking down the killer?
3	"Episode Three"	James Strong	Michael Crompton	N/A	N/A
In early January 1987, the testing program begins in earnest. Young men from the three-village area nearest the two assaults voluntarily line up to provide blood samples for DNA fingerprinting. Initial turnout is good, but it soon becomes evident that generating the profiles will be a slow process. On the plus side, only a fraction of the estimated 5,000 samples to be taken will need full genetic fingerprinting, as many may be excluded based on attributes such as blood type. Even so, for those 1,000 or so remaining samples, the Forensic Science Service estimates that completing the DNA profiling will take five months — likely longer. Meanwhile, Jeffreys is temporarily forced off the project when he falls ill with a viral infection, and is briefly hospitalised. Though his health issues have little impact on the pace of blood-sample testing (where his role is largely supervisory), the program’s slow progress, high cost and ongoing failure to find a new suspect cause frustration and second-guessing on multiple fronts. There is pressure on the police to either show results, or cut their losses and end the program. In mid-September, with nearly all sampling in the targeted area complete, a break in the case occurs: A local woman comes forward claiming she’d overheard in a pub one of her co-workers saying he’d given a blood sample for someone else. Under police questioning, the man admits that he’d provided a blood sample while posing as his boss, Colin Pitchfork, using a falsified passport provided by Pitchfork. DCS Baker and his team recover Pitchfork’s doctored passport from his workplace, and take him into custody. A DNA profile of Pitchfork’s blood proves to be an exact match to those from the crime scenes of both Lynda Mann and Dawn Ashworth. Pitchfork is charged with — and eventually found guilty of — both their murders, receiving two life sentences in prison. (The man who posed falsely as Pitchfork is charged with conspiring to pervert the course of justice.) Recognising science’s role in the case, the judge states that without DNA fingerprinting, the killer likely would have remained free.

== Reception ==
=== Critical reception ===
The drama received a mixed reception. The first part was criticised for dramatic sluggishness and a reliance on crime-show clichés in the portrayal of the two main characters. The depiction of Alec Jeffreys as the stereotypical absent-minded "boffin" was cited by several reviewers. Gerard O'Donovan in The Daily Telegraph called the show's version of him a "stock obsessive boffin so wedded to his lab instruments that his marriage was permanently on the brink of collapse". Julia Raeside in The Guardian wrote, "There are obligatory scenes in which Jeffreys misses a school play and receives a phone call from his wife pronouncing, 'Your dinner’s in the dog.' There are only so many times co-workers can remark, 'Don’t work too late' or 'Aren’t you going home?' before the hammering repetition starts to cause a dent in your enjoyment." Chris Bennion in The Independent concluded that "Sadly this drama had the fingerprints of countless other by-numbers crime thrillers all over it."

Alex Hardy in The Times was less critical, giving the show four stars out of five and saying that "this fact-based drama managed to balance tragedy with optimism", but added that it "inevitably contained elements of soap".
