= Episode 6550 =

EastEnders episode

- EastEnders episode
- Episode no.: Episode 6550
- Directed by: Toby Frow
- Written by: Simon Ashdown
- Original air date: 5 September 2022
- Running time: 30 minutes

Episode chronology
| ← Previous; Episode 6549 | Next → Episode 6551 |

Episode 6550 of the British television soap opera EastEnders was broadcast in the United Kingdom on BBC One on 5 September 2022. The episode was directed by Toby Frow and written by Simon Ashdown. It takes the form of a flashback episode, set in both the present and in January 1979, and explores the reason for DCI Samantha Keeble's (Alison Newman) vendetta against the Mitchell family.

The episode was first announced in July 2022, when it was reported that Jaime Winstone, who had previously portrayed a young Barbara Windsor in the 2017 biopic film Babs, would appear as Peggy. The episode also featured the first on-screen appearance of Peggy's husband, Eric, as well as other members of the Mitchell family. The episode won praise among critics and viewers alike, with viewers calling for further flashback episodes to be made. Executive Producer Chris Clenshaw signalled his interest in making further flashback episodes.

On 13 February 2025, Delaney, Winstone, Russo, Jay and Murphy returned as Young Phil, Peggy, Eric, Grant and Sam respectively (as their 1985 counterparts) for a one-off episode as hallucinations to Phil Mitchell (Steve McFadden) as he experiences psychotic depression. On 23 December 2025, Delaney and Jay made unannounced returns as Phil and Grant as hallucinations of Nigel Bates (Paul Bradley) as part of his early onset dementia storyline.

== Plot ==
DCI Samantha Keeble (Alison Newman) meets with Phil Mitchell (Steve McFadden) in her car. Keeble tells Phil that she wants him to inform on his cousin Billy Mitchell (Perry Fenwick), to which Phil refuses to do so.

In January 1979, the United Kingdom is in the grip of the Winter of Discontent, and the Mitchells are living in the London district of Limehouse. As the family eat dinner, patriarch Eric Mitchell (George Russo) learns that Phil (Daniel Delaney) has found a job as a garage mechanic and is furious. He also tries to dissuade Phil's brother Grant (Teddy Jay) from his wish to join the British Armed Forces, telling them both they should do a real job and he is going to give them some "work experience". He leaves his wife Peggy (Jaime Winstone) at home with their young daughter Sam (Laila Murphy) and forces Phil and Grant to join him in an armed robbery at a warehouse alongside his cousin Stephen (Dean Roberts), and his sons Charlie (Charlie Heptinstall) and Billy (George Greenland). When Peggy objects to his actions, Eric assaults her.

While Eric and the boys are away, Peggy is visited by Eric's brother Archie (Henry Garrett), his wife Glenda (Rose Reynolds), and their two young daughters Ronnie (Lucia De Wan) and Roxy (Elodie De Rohan Willner). Archie and Peggy have a conversation before he leaves for the evening to meet with a mistress, and it is suggested there is some mutual attraction between him and Peggy.

Peggy and Glenda then talk in the kitchen, sharing a drink and discussing their husbands, while their children play in the front room. However, Peggy furiously scolds Ronnie and Roxy after they encourage Sam to draw on the wallpaper, leading to an argument between her and Glenda, which ends with Peggy ejecting her sister-in-law.

At the warehouse, Eric and the boys steal video recorders when they are caught by a security guard (Christopher Pizzey). Billy falls from a ladder while trying to steal a VHS package before Eric orders everyone to leave and abandon him. However, Phil and Grant decide to save Billy, leading to Phil holding the security guard at gunpoint while Stephen and Charlie leave. Eric attempts to goad Phil into shooting the security guard with the words "Let him have it!", but the guard pleads with Phil, telling him he has a young daughter. When Phil cannot bring himself to pull the trigger, a frustrated Eric takes the gun from him, orders the others to leave and then shoots the security guard dead.

Phil later confronts Eric about the shooting. When he, Grant and Eric return home, Eric threatens to beat Phil with a belt for challenging him. Peggy, having had enough of his abuse, grabs a knife and threatens him. Eric turns his abuse on Peggy and attacks her; enraged, Phil attacks Eric, ultimately overpowering him before threatening to kill him if he harms Peggy again.

Back in the present, Keeble reveals to Phil that the security guard that Eric killed that night was her father, Malcolm. She once again orders Phil to inform on Billy, warning him he will go back to prison if he does not do so.

== Cast ==
- Steve McFadden as Phil Mitchell
  - Daniel Delaney as young Phil Mitchell
- Alison Newman as DCI Samantha Keeble
  - Phoebe Rose Gordon as young Samantha Keeble
- Teddy Jay as Grant Mitchell
- Laila Murphy as Sam Mitchell
- Jaime Winstone as Peggy Mitchell
- George Russo as Eric Mitchell
- George Greenland as Billy Mitchell
- Charlie Heptinstall as Charlie Mitchell
- Dean Roberts as Stephen Mitchell
- Henry Garrett as Archie Mitchell
- Rose Reynolds as Glenda Mitchell
- Lucia De Wan as Ronnie Mitchell
- Elodie De Rohan Willner as Roxy Mitchell
- Andrew Mayer as security guard
- Christopher Pizzey as Malcolm Keeble
- David Ajayi as police officer
- Lizzie Grace as Mrs Keeble

== Announcement ==
Details of the episode were first announced on 26 July 2022, when it was revealed that a flashback episode taking place in 1979 and featuring a younger version of Peggy Mitchell would air in the autumn, with Jaime Winstone having been chosen to play the part of Peggy. The character had first been introduced in 1991, when she was played for a few episodes by Jo Warne, before Barbara Windsor played the role from 1994 to 2016. Winstone played Windsor in the 2017 BBC biopic Babs, portraying the actress in her 20s and 30s. It was reported the episode would explore some of the Mitchell family's history, and Winstone spoke of her delight at being chosen to play the role of Peggy: "It's been such an honour to step into Peggy Mitchell's shoes for the first time, and into Barbara's shoes for the second time". The episode would also feature the first onscreen appearance of Peggy's husband, Eric Mitchell, who would be portrayed by George Russo, as well as other previously unseen family members, and take place in early 1979, against the backdrop of the Winter of Discontent, where "clues to [Phil]'s present" would "undoubtedly be revealed".

Winstone said that Windsor, who died in 2020, was happy with her selection for Babs, telling her, "You're more me than me but you've got to make this your own", but spoke of feeling intimidated by the thought of playing the younger version of Peggy. She ultimately decided to accept the part after seeing a "beautiful blonde butterfly knocking around my garden for a couple of days" while considering whether to take on the role, and feeling this was Windsor signalling her approval. Speaking about his role as Eric Mitchell, Russo described how he connected with the character: "I try and find a piece of music that sort of encapsulates the character so that when you listen to the music it can put you in that mind frame and put you into the characters quickly. I listen to a few pieces of music, the main one was Folsom Prison Blues by Johnny Cash."

A preview image of the Mitchells in 1979 was released on 24 August, while it was also confirmed the episode would air on Monday 5 September at 7:30 pm, on BBC One and BBC iPlayer. Further pictures from the episode were released on 4 September, along with a brief outline of the plot.

== Reception ==
Writing in The Daily Telegraph, Michael Hogal gave the episode four out of five stars, and described it as "a pacy caper" that was "Life On Mars meets kitchen-sink drama, sensitively weaving together past and present". He praised Winstone's Peggy Mitchell, saying "within just half an hour, she made the character her own – respectfully nodding to Windsor's incarnation but succeeding on its own terms". He also described Delaney's portrayal of Phil as "terrific", but questioned why Keeble would seek her revenge against Billy rather than Phil himself, suggesting it was an aspect of the story that "wasn't clearly explained" in the episode (the following day's episode revealed that Billy had procured the gun which was used in the robbery). Winstone's Peggy was also praised by Caroline Frost, writing in the i newspaper, describing her as having "brought a subtle nuance to her portrayal bringing out the softer layers in the character that the older woman had presumably buried in the years since".

Laura Denby, writing in The Radio Times also praised the episode, saying it had "surpassed all expectations, covering far more than just DCI Keeble's vendetta against the Mitchells and paving the way for more trips down memory lane". She noted Delaney's likeness to Steve McFadden's Phil, who "delivered a stunning character study". In the Metro, Soaps Editor Duncan Lindsay felt that "the beauty of the episode was in the fact that you could watch it without being up to date with EastEnders, and be drawn in and able to follow it", and wondered why the idea of exploring characters' back stories had not been done before: "in the same breath as I applaud the ingenuity of this episode’s concept and execution, I wonder why it has taken so long. It is setting a very interesting precedent for soap as a whole and one which could be a game changer for the better."

The episode proved to be popular with viewers, many of who took to social media to congratulate the producers for their choice of actors. In particular, Delaney's portrayal of Phil won praise, with one viewer writing that his "mannerisms are spot on. Grant & Peggy too. Great acting". Following the positive comments, Winstone thanked viewers on her Twitter account: "Thank you for all your lovely messages, I am truly honoured to play such an iconic character Peggy Mitchell. This was such a special and emotional job for me. Barbara opened many doors for actresses like me and I’m eternally grateful to have known her and witness her magic, here’s to you, Barbara Windsor." The Radio Times conducted a poll asking viewers if they would like to see further flashback episodes, with 71.6 per cent of responders saying they would. EastEnders Executive Producer Chris Clenshaw has spoken of his interest in doing further flashback episodes.

Figures compiled by the Broadcasters' Audience Research Board (BARB) indicated the episode had been watched by 3.98 million viewers.

== Further developments ==
In January 2025 the BBC confirmed that Delaney, Winstone, Russo, Jay and Murphy would reprise their roles as Young Phil, Peggy, Eric, Grant and Sam respectively (as their 1985 counterparts) for a one off episode as hallucinations of Phil Mitchell. Their appearance was part of an ongoing storyline concerned Phil's battle with depression, and the BBC worked with charities such as The Samaritans, Rethink Mental Illness, the Campaign Against Living Miserably and Mind to develop the storyline. The episode featuring the characters was aired on 13 February.
