= Aaliyah James =

English actress (born 2000)

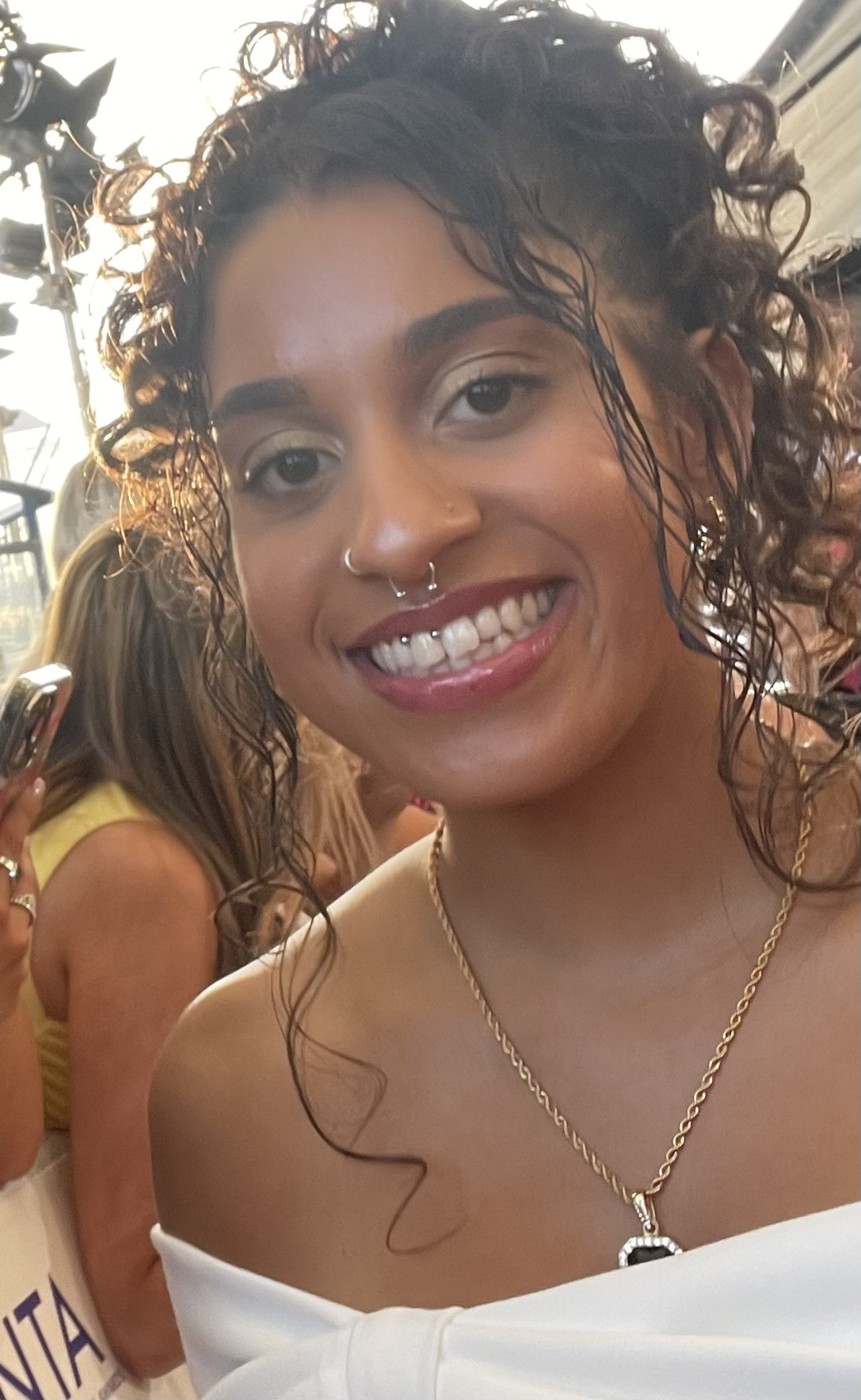
- James in 2024
- Born: Aaliyah James
- Occupation: Actress
- Years active: 2022–present
- Television: Inside Man; EastEnders

Aaliyah James is an English actress, known for portraying the role of Avani Nandra-Hart on the BBC soap opera EastEnders since 2023.

== Career ==
In 2022, James made her television debut when she appeared in the BBC One crime drama Inside Man, portraying a train passenger in the programme's first episode.

In October 2023, James joined the cast of the BBC soap opera EastEnders as Avani Nandra-Hart. Her character is introduced alongside mother Priya Nandra-Hart (Sophie Khan Levy) as the secret daughter of Ravi Gulati (Aaron Thiara) and sister of Davinder "Nugget" Gulati (Juhaim Rasul Choudhury). Her storylines have included her reconciliation with her long-lost father, as well as her involvement in an underage relationship.

== Filmography ==
Year	Title	Role	Notes	Ref.
2022	Inside Man	Train passenger	1 episode	
2023–2026	EastEnders	Avani Nandra-Hart	Regular role	
