= Tunji Kasim =

Scottish actor

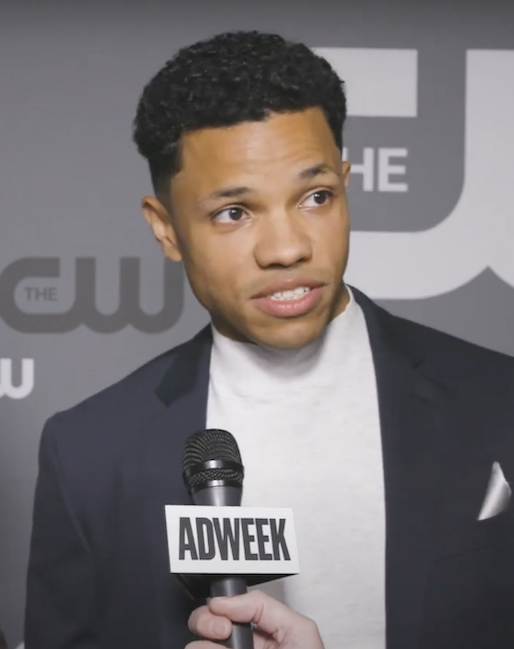
- Kasim in 2019
- Born: Adetunji Kasim; 10 September 1987 (age 38); Aberdeen, Scotland
- Education: Royal Scottish Academy of Drama and Music
- Occupation: Actor
- Years active: 2007–present
- Known for: Ned Nickerson in Nancy Drew

Adetunji "Tunji" Kasim (born 10 September 1987) is a Scottish-Nigerian actor. He is best known for his role as Joe Bailey in Nearly Famous (on E4), Hugo Scott, an art teacher in Shetland, and Ned Nickerson in The CW's Nancy Drew.

In 2009, he was nominated for an Ian Charleson Awards drama award for Julius Caesar (with the RSC).

== Early life and education ==
He was born in Aberdeen, but moved to Nigeria soon after birth. He lived there until he was 12, and then the family moved back to Aberdeen and spent his teenage years in Kincorth. His mother is Scottish, a primary school teacher raised on a farm in Auchenblae and his father is Nigerian, a research fellow and lecturer at Aberdeen University, having previously studied there for his PhD in economics.

His first thoughts of a career were of being a boxer or a dishwasher. He then studied at the Royal Scottish Academy of Music and Drama in Glasgow, which is now called Royal Conservatoire of Scotland.

== Acting credits ==
=== Theatre ===
Year	Title	Role	Director	Theatre
2006	Inferno	Chorus	Andy Arnold	The Arches
2006	Mazepa	Chorus	Peter Stein	Edinburgh Festival Theatre
2006	The Talented Mr Ripley	Reddington	Acorn Theatre Company	Aberdeen
2006	Of Mice and Men	Crooks	Martin McNaughton	Òran Mór
2007	Big White Fog	The Masons' radicalised son	Michael Attenborough	Almeida theatre
2007–2008	The Brothers Size	Oshoosi	Bijan Sheibani	Young Vic theatre
2008	The Cracks in my Skin	Linden	Chris Meads	Royal Exchange, Manchester
2009	The Winter’s Tale	Florizel	David Farr	Courtyard Theatre
2009	Julius Caesar	Romulus, Lucius	Lucy Bailey	Courtyard Theatre
2009	The Grain Store	Arsei Pechoritsa	Michael Boyd	Courtyard Theatre
2010	King Lear	Edmund	David Farr	Courtyard Theatre
2010	Antony and Cleopatra	Mardian	Michael Boyd	Courtyard Theatre
2011	American Trade	Pharus	Jamie Lloyd	Hampstead Theatre
2012	The Duchess of Malfi	Delio	Jamie Lloyd	The Old Vic
2012	But I Could Only Whisper	Marvin	Nadia Latif	Arcola Theatre
2014	Orlando	Chorus	Max Webster	Royal Exchange, Manchester
2014	The Christmas Truce	Brisker/Franz Roper	Erica Whyman	Royal Shakespeare Theatre
2014–2015	Love's Labour's Lost	Dumaine	Christopher Luscombe	Royal Shakespeare Theatre
2014–2015	Much Ado About Nothing	Claudio	Christopher Luscombe	Royal Shakespeare Theatre
2016	Les Blancs	Eric	Yaël Farber	National Theatre
2016	Love's Labour's Lost	Dumaine	Christopher Luscombe	Chichester Festival Theatre/Manchester Opera House/Theatre Royal, Haymarket
2016	Much Ado About Nothing	Claudio	Christopher Luscombe	Chichester Festival Theatre/Manchester Opera House/Theatre Royal, Haymarket
2017	Network	Frank Hackett	Ivo Van Hove	Royal National Theatre
2018–2019	Antony and Cleopatra	Caesar	Simon Godwin	Royal National Theatre

=== Film ===
Year	Film	Role
2016	Florence Foster Jenkins	Private Smith
2019	The Kill Team	Sergeant Wallace
2019	The Good Liar	Michael

=== Television ===
Year	Film	Role	Notes
2007	Nearly Famous	Joe Bailey	Main role
2013	Rubenesque	Clyde	Telefilm
2014	Shetland	Hugo Scott	Episodes: Raven Black: Part 1 & Raven Black: Part 2
2019	Cold Feet	Zack Aspin	Season 8, episode 4
2019–2023	Nancy Drew	Ned "Nick" Nickerson	Main role
2020	Avenue 5	Lighting Tech	Episode: He's Only There to Stop His Skeleton from Falling Over
2023	Queen Charlotte: A Bridgerton Story	Adolphus IV, Duke of Mecklenburg-Strelitz	4 episodes
