= Nearly Famous =

- Genre: Drama
- Created by: Holly Phillips
- Directed by: Sheree Folkson; Mat Whitecross; John Hardwick
- Opening theme: "Just for Tonight" by One Night Only
- Country of origin: United Kingdom
- Original language: English
- No. of series: 1
- No. of episodes: 6

Production
- Executive producers: Simon Crawford Collins; Jane Featherstone; Alison Jackson
- Producer: Emma Kingsman-Lloyd
- Production locations: Rose Bruford College, Sidcup, Kent, England
- Editors: Richard Mark Elson; Philip Hookway; Jackie Ophir
- Running time: 45 minutes approximately, 65 minutes with adverts

Original release
- Network: E4
- Release: 8 November – 13 December 2007

Nearly Famous is a television drama miniseries about a group of British teenagers at a top London school of the performing arts. It was shown in the UK and Ireland on E4. The show was compared to other teen drama series such as The O.C. and Skins. The show debuted on E4 on 8 November 2007 and ended its run on 13 December 2007, having been filmed in Kent, England.

== Synopsis ==
The six part series follows Lila (Talulah Riley), an awkward 19-year-old with a mentally ill mother, but with an exceptional talent for writing; Owen (Aaron Johnson), who can not read music any more than he can rewrite his wayward past; Joe, (Tunji Kasim) a nice guy with a talent doing light and sound, who is a bit of a nerd; and Kate (Anna Brewster) a beautiful, ambitious actress, who is sick of living in the shadow of her successful film director dad. Over the six-week series, the world of this unlikely group of friends is explored.

== Characters ==
- Aaron Johnson as Owen Stephens – A talented musician with a past that seems to haunt him.
- Talulah Riley as Lila Reed – A writer with a heart. Her mother has a mental health condition and does not want to let go of her daughter.
- Tunji Kasim as Joe Bailey – Misunderstood technology geek from a tough background who wants to achieve something in life
- Anna Brewster as Kate Sherman – An actress striving to receive recognition of her own talents without the help of her famous father.
- Jimi Mistry as Matt Bright – Music teacher who has a long and complicated history with Jen. He has hopes to make it big in the music industry.
- Rebecca Palmer as Jen Bracken – Writing teacher with marital problems. Matt is her only means of support.
- Lizzy McInnerny as Rita Rocheman – Dance teacher who has a history with Dominic.
- Ralph Brown as Dominic Soloman – Drama teacher and principal of the Salinger School

=== Other cast ===
- Ella Jones as Sarah
- Anna McAuley as Henri
- Max Gell as Cal Redmond
- Rosalind Halstead as Kelly Short
- Gregg Chillin as Ash Chopra
- Gina Bellman as Traci Reed
- Nicolas Woodman as Jamie

== Soundtrack ==
- Incidental music by Simon Boswell
- Original songs by Joe Boswell
- "Love Will Tear Us Apart" by Joy Division
- "Hallelujah" by Leonard Cohen

Choreographed by Caroline Pope.
