= Boy Meets Boy (2021 film) =

- Promotional poster
- Directed by: Daniel Sanchez Lopez
- Screenplay by: Hannah Renton; Daniel Sanchez Lopez
- Produced by: Lucia Sapelli; Daniel Sanchez Lopez
- Starring: Matthew James Morrison; Alexis Koutsoulis
- Cinematography: Hanna Biornstad
- Edited by: Thea Aae
- Production company: Cosmic Productions
- Distributed by: Gol Studios; Gaga OO Lala
- Release date: 2021 (BFI Flare: London LGBTIQ+ Film Festival): 3 January 2022 (Kino International)
- Running time: 70 minutes
- Country: Germany
- Language: English

Boy Meets Boy is a 2021 German English-language film directed by Daniel Sanchez Lopez and starring Matthew James Morrison and Alexis Koutsoulis. The film premiered at the BFI Flare: London LGBTIQ+ Film Festival in 2021.

== Plot ==
Johannes meets the young British intern Harry in a club in Berlin. The latter has already been partying for 48 hours and hasn't actually seen anything of the city. Johannes offers to find the tourist an internet café to print out his boarding pass. During the 15 hours Harry has to wait for his flight home, the two young men remain together, driving and walking through summery Berlin and trying to be completely honest with each other.

== Cast ==
- Matthew James Morrison as Harry
- Alexis Koutsoulis as Johannes

== Reception ==
A critic from Screen Daily wrote that "There is something of the confessional in the candour of their conversations and the light, easy chemistry between Alexis Koutsoulis and Matthew James Morrison goes a long way to make us care about how this encounter will end". A critic from The Guardian wrote that "Instead of getting viewers invested in a budding romance, the film makes you wish Harry would just board the plane and leave". A critic from 20 minutos wrote that he doesn't think Boy Meets Boy would be well suited to a different language, whether idiomatic or audiovisual, than that used by Daniel Sánchez López and his two main performers. His is a great debut, despite the awkwardness of some camera movements and the fact that the location work doesn't look as it should". A critic from Attitude wrote that Its slow pace will doubtless test the patience and attention spans of some viewers; ironic, given a slight 75-minutes running time, that leaves it feeling somewhat incomplete. Were other, more conclusive epiphanies left on the cutting room floor?"

== Accolades ==
Award (Note: Awards, festivals and organizations are in alphabetical order.)	Date of ceremony (Note: Date is linked to the article about the awards held that year, wherever possible.)	Category	Recipient(s)	Result	Ref.
Molodist Kyiv International Film Festival	May-June 2021	Sunny Bunny Competition — Special Jury Award	Boy Meets Boy	Won	
Frameline San Francisco Film Festival	June 2021	Best First Feature Film	Boy Meets Boy	Nominated	
Rhode Island International Film Festival	August 2021	Alternative Spirit Award (Feature) — Grand Prize	Boy Meets Boy	Won	
