= Juhaim Rasul Choudhury =

English actor (born 2005)

- Born: 8 February 2005 (age 21); Brent, London, England
- Occupation: Actor
- Years active: 2022–present
- Television: EastEnders

Juhaim Rasul Choudhury (born 8 February 2005) is an English actor. His is known for his role as Davinder "Nugget" Gulati in the BBC soap opera EastEnders (2022–present).

== Early life and education ==
Juhaim Rasul Choudhury was born on 8 February 2005 in Brent, London, England. He is of Assamese (north-east Indian) heritage. He was educated at St Joseph's Catholic High School, Slough, where he studied drama.

== Career ==
In August 2022, Choudhury joined the cast of the BBC soap opera EastEnders as Davinder "Nugget" Gulati, the son of Ravi Gulati (Aaron Thiara) and a member of the Panesar family. His character's storylines in the soap have included the introduction of his mother Priya Nandra-Hart (Sophie Khan Levy) and secret sister Avani (Aaliyah James), developing a steroid addiction after suffering from muscle dysmorphia and ultimately being placed on kidney dialysis, as well as aiding grandfather Nish Panesar (Navin Chowdhry) following his escape from prison.

== Filmography ==
Year	Title	Role	Notes	Ref.
2022–present	EastEnders	Davinder "Nugget" Gulati	Regular role	
