= Jaden Ladega =

English actor (born 2005)

- Born: Jaden Luke Ladega; 28 October 2005 (age 20); Sutton, Greater London, England
- Education: North East Surrey College of Technology
- Occupation: Actor
- Years active: 2022–present
- Known for: Role of Denzel Danes in EastEnders

Jaden Luke Ladega (born 28 October 2005) is an English actor. He is known for his role of Denzel Danes in the BBC One soap opera EastEnders (2022–present).

== Early life ==
Jaden Luke Ladega was born into a Roman Catholic family in Sutton, Greater London, England on 28 October 2005, as the elder child to Andrew Babatunde Ladega, a personal trainer at PureGym London Wandsworth on Wandsworth High Street, and his wife, Doreen Desire "Denisha" (née Quirin), a housewife. He has a younger brother called Jenson. His parents later divorced.

Ladega attended St Cecilia's Catholic Primary School in Worcester Park and Richard Challoner School in New Malden. In June 2022, he was the recipient of a Creative Arts Award for his contribution to Richard Challoner School's drama department and to the performing arts. He completed his training in acting at North East Surrey College of Technology (NESCOT) in Epsom and Ewell graduating in 2024.

Ladega started running competitively for his primary school in the Surrey Championships at the age of six, and competed annually in Coulsdon, Wimbledon, and Carshalton. He joined Sutton and District Athletics Club's weekly program for children of all abilities at the age of nine, and, at the age of eleven, he was promoted at a competitive level in the under 13s. He participated in the 60 metres, the 100 metres, the 200 metres, the high jump, and the long jump. He started acting in drama clubs, and made short films using his phone and a green screen. He appeared regularly in musical theatre productions during his high school years, including in the Lionel Bart stage musical Oliver!, and as Orin Scrivello, DDS in the Alan Menken and Howard Ashman horror comedy rock musical Little Shop of Horrors. He has also acted in several works by the playwright and poet William Shakespeare at the Rose Theatre Kingston.

== Career ==
Ladega has been represented by Rebecca Pumphrey from Independent Talent Group since June 2022. He made his professional debut as an actor, at the age of sixteen, when he joined the cast of the BBC One soap opera EastEnders, with the role of Denzel Danes. His casting was announced on 6 June 2022. He started filming a few days later. Denzel makes his first appearance in episode 6531, originally broadcast on BBC Two on 2 August 2022, and is introduced as the son of Howie Danes (Delroy Atkinson). Denzel arrives in Walford with his mother, Delilah (Chereen Buckley), who arranges for him to live with his father and stepmother, Kim Fox (Tameka Empson), while she is away in Ibiza. His character was introduced by Chris Clenshaw. His character's storylines have included befriending Davinder "Nugget" Gulati (Juhaim Rasul Choudhury), bullying Amy Mitchell (Abbie Burke) before beginning a relationship with her (Ellie Dadd), fighting for his life in hospital following a car accident with his stepmother, being attacked by Walford High student Logan (Liam Hatch), taking up boxing, developing muscle dysmorphia, purchasing steroids, and erectile dysfunction. He appeared throughout the 40th Anniversary Week during February 2025, including in the double episode and in the live episode.

== Charity work ==
Ladega participated in the second annual Tom Parker football match at Dorking Wanderers F.C.'s Meadowbank stadium on 16 June (Father's Day) 2024, to raise funds and spread awareness of brain tumours. He participated in the third annual football match at Bromley F.C.'s Hayes Lane stadium on 10 May 2025.

== Personal life ==
Ladega supports the Premier League football team Arsenal F.C. and has visited Emirates Stadium in Holloway, London, on several occasions. He has a dog named Kirby "Kirbs" (b. 2021). On 20 October 2024, he announced the death of his great-aunt Marie.

== Filmography ==
Year	Title	Role	Notes	Ref.
2022–present	EastEnders	Denzel Danes	Regular role	

== Awards and nominations ==
Year	Ceremony	Award	Nominated works	Result
2024	RadioTimes.com Soap Awards	Best Young Performer	Denzel Danes in EastEnders	Nominated
2024	29th National Television Awards	Serial Drama Performance	Denzel Danes in EastEnders	Longlisted
2024	Inside Soap Awards	Best Young Performer	Denzel Danes in EastEnders	Longlisted

Ladega was nominated for "Best Young Performer" at the 2024 RadioTimes.com Soap Awards, however, he lost to Charlie Wrenshall (Liam Connor Jr., Coronation Street). He was longlisted for "Serial Drama Performance" at the 29th National Television Awards, however, he lost to Peter Ash (Paul Foreman, Coronation Street). He was longlisted for "Best Young Performer" at the 2024 Inside Soap Awards, however, he lost to Charlie Wrenshall (Liam Connor Jr., Coronation Street).
