= Jaz Deol =

British actor (b. 1989)

- Born: Jaskiranjit Singh Deol; 12 March 1989 (age 37); Hounslow, England
- Occupation: Actor
- Years active: 2010–present
- Television: The Halcyon; EastEnders

Jaskiranjit Singh Deol (born 12 March 1989) is a British actor known for playing Kheerat Panesar on the BBC soap opera EastEnders from 2019 to 2022.

== Career ==
Deol made his onscreen debut in the 2010 television film Casting Nina as Bhaljit Singh. He then made appearances in television series such as Code of a Killer, Together and The Halcyon. In October 2019, he began playing Kheerat Panesar in the BBC soap opera EastEnders. Deol's character was part of the first Sikh family in EastEnders. The Panesar family are of Ramgarhia Sikh heritage.

== Filmography ==
Film
Year	Title	Role	Notes
2010	Ladri de Biscotti	Joe	Short film
2010	It's Me	Nick	Short film
2011	Restless Dust	Chris	
2011	Penguin	Yusuf	Short film
2012	London Stories	Sarjit	
2012	Glimpse	Hak	Short film
2013	London Kahanis	Pradeep	
2014	Honeycomb Lodge	Ajay	
2017	Viceroy's House	Duleep Singh	
2017	The Show	Jimmy	
2017	The Boy With The Topknot	Rajah	
2018	The Debt	Ali	Short film
2019	Darkness Visible	Ronnie	
2019	The Exam Board	Hardeep	

Television
Year	Title	Role	Notes
2010	Casting Nina	Bhaljit Singh	TV movie
2011	The Conference	Jaz	Television special
2014	That's English	Jez	1 episode
2015	Code of a Killer	DC Taran Kholi	Main role
2015	Together	Luke	2 episodes
2016	The Jason Philips Show	Dean	2 episodes
2017	The Halcyon	Harvinder Singh	Recurring role; 4 episodes
2017	Halloween Comedy Shorts	Tom	1 episode
2017	Love, Lies and Records	Farooq	1 episode
2018	Lovesick	Adal	1 episode
2019–2022	EastEnders	Kheerat Panesar	Series regular
2025	Toxic Town	Chief Executive	Mini-series; 3 episodes
2025	Sister Boniface Mysteries	Dr Saatvik Bose	1 episode

== Awards and nominations ==
Year	Award	Category	Result	Ref.
2020	I Talk Telly Awards	Best Soap Performance	Nominated	
2020	Inside Soap Awards	Best Newcomer	Shortlisted	
2021	26th National Television Awards	Serial Drama Performance	Nominated	
2021	Inside Soap Awards	Best Actor	Nominated	
2021	Asian Media Awards	Best TV Character	Won	
2022	Inside Soap Awards	Best Actor	Nominated	
2022	Inside Soap Awards	Best Romance (shared with Lacey Turner)	Shortlisted	
2022	Digital Spy Reader Awards	Best Soap Actor (Male)	Second	
