= Sophie Khan Levy =

English actress (born 1989)

- Born: Sophie Shaheen Khan Levy; 25 July 1989 (age 37); Wandsworth, London, England
- Education: University of Warwick; Guildhall School of Music and Drama
- Occupation: Actress
- Years active: 2010–present
- Television: EastEnders
- Mother: Shaheen Khan

Sophie Shaheen Khan Levy (born 25 July 1989) is a British actress. She has appeared in Royal Shakespeare Company productions including Cymbeline (2013), Love's Labour's Lost (2014), A Midsummer Night's Dream (2015), and As You Like It (2019). In 2023, Levy was cast in the BBC soap opera EastEnders as Priya Nandra-Hart, a role she played until 2026.

== Early life ==
Sophie Shaheen Khan Levy was born on 25 July 1989 in Wandsworth, south London. Her mother is actress Shaheen Khan, who starred in Bend it Like Beckham. She is of mixed race descent; her mother was born in Moshi, Tanzania, and is of Indian descent, while her father was born in Toronto, Canada. She has a younger sister, Nyla, who also acts. Her mother set up Tara Arts, one of the country's first acting schools specifically for Asian actors. Levy credits her mother with inspiring her to act. In her youth, Levy lived in Canada with her cousin for a year and a half. She graduated from the University of Warwick and later studied at the Guildhall School of Music and Drama. Whilst at Guildhall, she appeared in stage productions including As You Like It, Merrily We Roll Along, and A Respectable Wedding.

== Career ==
Upon graduating from Guildhall in 2013, Levy appeared in Cymbeline, for which she received critical acclaim. She was then contracted by the Royal Shakespeare Company to appear in various productions. They described her as a "fiercely intelligent and brilliant actress". She performed in Hanna, a one-woman show, in 2018, for which she received numerous positive reviews. The Independent wrote that Levy had "a lovely unforced naturalness" and performed the play beautifully, while The Guardian admired her "compelling performance and sympathetic naturalness".

In 2022, Levy appeared in three episodes of the Channel 5 series All Creatures Great and Small. The following year, she featured in an episode of The Sixth Commandment, and was cast in the BBC One soap opera EastEnders as Priya Nandra-Hart until 2026.

== Personal life ==
In September 2026, Levy confirmed that she is pregnant.

== Filmography ==
Year	Title	Role	Notes
2013	The Last Bus	Alice	Short film
2016	Ride	Poppy	Guest role
2020	Avernus	Lou	Short film
2022	Mammals	Beth	Guest role
2022	All Creatures Great and Small	Florence Pandhi	Recurring role
2023	The Sixth Commandment	Gabrielle Ade	Guest role
2023–2026	EastEnders	Priya Nandra-Hart	Regular role

== Stage ==
- Mystery Plays as Mary Magdalene
- Phaedra's Love as Phaedra
- Uncle Vanya as Sonya
- Private Lives as Amanda
- The Country Wife as Lady Fidget
- Trojan Women as Hecuba
- As You Like It as Celia
- Blood Wedding as Bride
- Merrily We Roll Along as Mary
- The Life and Adventures of Nicholas Nickleby as Mrs Crummies
- A Respectable Wedding as Lyndsay
- May 08 as Sophie
- Cymbeline as Imogen
- Love's Labour's Lost as Housemaid
- The Christmas Truce as Maud Furlong
- A Midsummer Night's Dream as Snug/Cobweb
- Fracked as Emma
- Hanna as Hanna
- Maydays as Clara
- Measure for Measure as Mariana
- While the Sun Shines as Mabel

== Awards and nominations ==
Year	Ceremony	Category	Nominated work	Result	Ref.
2019	Eastern Eye Arts, Culture & Theatre Awards	Best Actress	Hanna	Nominated	
2023	Digital Spy Reader Awards	Rising Star	EastEnders	Second	
2024	Inside Soap Awards	Best Newcomer	EastEnders	Shortlisted	
2026	National Television Awards	Serial Drama Performance	EastEnders	Pending	
