= List of EastEnders characters =

EastEnders logo

EastEnders is a British television soap opera first broadcast on BBC1 on 19 February 1985. The following is a list of characters who are currently appearing in the programme, listed in order of first appearance. In the case that more than one actor has portrayed a character, the current actor portraying the character is listed last.

== Present characters ==
=== Regular characters ===
Character	Actor(s)	Duration	Ref.
Kathy Beale	Gillian Taylforth	1985–2000, 2015–present	
Sharon Watts	Letitia Dean	1985–1995, 2001–2006, 2012–present	
Ian Beale	Adam Woodyatt	1985–present	
Vicki Fowler	Emma Herry	1986–1995, 2003–2004, 2025–present	
Vicki Fowler	Samantha Leigh Martin	1986–1995, 2003–2004, 2025–present	
Vicki Fowler	Scarlett Alice Johnson	1986–1995, 2003–2004, 2025–present	
Vicki Fowler	Alice Haig	1986–1995, 2003–2004, 2025–present	
Cindy Beale	Michelle Collins	1988–1990, 1992–1998, 2023–present	
Janine Butcher	Rebecca Michael	1989–1996, 1999–2004, 2008–2014, 2021–2022, 2026–present	
Janine Butcher	Alexia Demetriou	1989–1996, 1999–2004, 2008–2014, 2021–2022, 2026–present	
Janine Butcher	Charlie Brooks	1989–1996, 1999–2004, 2008–2014, 2021–2022, 2026–present	
Phil Mitchell	Steve McFadden	1990–2003, 2005–present	
Peter Beale	Francis Brittin-Snell	1993–2010, 2013–2015, 2020–present	
Peter Beale	Alex Stevens	1993–2010, 2013–2015, 2020–present	
Peter Beale	Joseph Shade	1993–2010, 2013–2015, 2020–present	
Peter Beale	James Martin	1993–2010, 2013–2015, 2020–present	
Peter Beale	Ben Hardy	1993–2010, 2013–2015, 2020–present	
Peter Beale	Dayle Hudson	1993–2010, 2013–2015, 2020–present	
Peter Beale	Thomas Law	1993–2010, 2013–2015, 2020–present	
Billy Mitchell	Perry Fenwick	1998–present	
Kat Slater	Jessie Wallace	2000–2005, 2010–2016, 2018–present	
Mo Harris	Laila Morse	2000–2016, 2018–2022, 2024–present	
Patrick Trueman	Rudolph Walker	2001–present	
Alfie Moon	Shane Richie	2002–2005, 2010–2016, 2018–2019, 2022–present	
Yolande Trueman	Angela Wynter	2003–2008, 2017, 2023–present	
Jean Slater	Gillian Wright	2004–present	
Honey Mitchell	Emma Barton	2005–2008, 2014–present	
Chelsea Fox	Tiana Benjamin	2006–2010, 2020–present	
Chelsea Fox	Zaraah Abrahams	2006–2010, 2020–present	
Denise Fox	Diane Parish	2006–present	
Max Branning	Jake Wood	2006–2021, 2025–present	
Lauren Branning	Madeline Duggan	2006–2018, 2022–present	
Lauren Branning	Jacqueline Jossa	2006–2018, 2022–present	
Sean Slater	Robert Kazinsky	2006–2009, 2019, 2021–2022, 2026–present	
Jack Branning	Scott Maslen	2007–2013, 2015–present	
Oscar Branning	Gabriel Miller-Williams	2007–2015, 2017, 2025–2027	
Oscar Branning	Neo Hall	2007–2015, 2017, 2025–2027	
Oscar Branning	Charlee Hall	2007–2015, 2017, 2025–2027	
Oscar Branning	Pierre Counihan-Moullier	2007–2015, 2017, 2025–2027	
Penny Branning	Mia McKenna-Bruce	2008, 2024–present	
Penny Branning	Kitty Castledine	2008, 2024–present	
Amy Mitchell	Natalia Lipka-Kozanka	2008–present	
Amy Mitchell	Kamil Lipka-Kozanka	2008–present	
Amy Mitchell	Amelie Conway	2008–present	
Amy Mitchell	Abbie Burke	2008–present	
Amy Mitchell	Ellie Dadd	2008–present	
Kim Fox	Tameka Empson	2009–present	
Lily Slater	Alfie Duncan	2010, 2014–present	
Lily Slater	Poppy Crake	2010, 2014–present	
Lily Slater	Kennady Lacy-Breckenridge	2010, 2014–present	
Lily Slater	Aine Garvey	2010, 2014–present	
Lily Slater	Lillia Turner	2010, 2014–present	
Linda Carter	Kellie Bright	2013–2027	
Johnny Carter	Sam Strike	2013–2014, 2016–2018, 2024–2027	
Johnny Carter	Ted Reilly	2013–2014, 2016–2018, 2024–2027	
Johnny Carter	Charlie Suff	2013–2014, 2016–2018, 2024–2027	
Nancy Carter	Maddy Hill	2014–2016, 2021–2022, 2024, 2026–present	
Lee Carter	Danny Hatchard	2014–2017, 2019–2020, 2024, 2026	
Elaine Peacock	Maria Friedman	2014–2017, 2023–present	
Elaine Peacock	Harriet Thorpe	2014–2017, 2023–present	
Mark Fowler	Ned Porteous	2016, 2026–present	
Mark Fowler	Stephen Aaron-Sipple	2016, 2026–present	
Callum Highway	Tony Clay	2018–present	
Ash Panesar	Gurlaine Kaur Garcha	2019–2023, 2026–present	
Ash Panesar	Sakira Vel	2019–2023, 2026–present	
Vinny Panesar	Shiv Jalota	2019–present	
Suki Panesar	Balvinder Sopal	2020–present	
Zack Hudson	James Farrar	2021–present	
Harvey Monroe	Ross Boatman	2021–present	
Howie Danes	Delroy Atkinson	2021–present	
Eve Panesar-Unwin	Heather Peace	2021–present	
Ravi Gulati	Aaron Thiara	2022–2026	
Denzel Danes	Jaden Ladega	2022–present	
Davinder "Nugget" Gulati	Juhaim Rasul Choudhury	2022–2026	
George Knight	Colin Salmon	2023–present	
Gina Knight	Francesca Henry	2023–2026	
Avani Nandra-Hart	Aaliyah James	2023–2026	
Harry Mitchell	Elijah Holloway	2024–present	
Barney Mitchell	Lewis Bridgeman	2024–present	
Kojo Asare	Dayo Koleosho	2024–present	
Nicola Mitchell	Laura Doddington	2024–present	
Ross Marshall	Alex Walkinshaw	2025–present	
Joel Marshall	Max Murray	2025–present	
Josh Goodwin	Joshua Vaughan	2025–present	
Jasmine Fisher	Indeyarna Donaldson-Holness	2025–present	
Gemma Hawkins	Patricia Potter	2026–present	
Jodie Hawkins	Anna Constable	2026–present	
Rose Hawkins	Marian McLoughlin	2026–present	
Darnell Larson Jr	Christopher Colquhoun	2026–present	
Grace Larson	Krysstina Frempong	2026–present	
Ryder Hawkins	Felix Uff	2026–present	
Ned Hawkins	Jamie Bamber	2026–present	

=== Recurring and guest characters ===
Character	Actor(s)	Duration	Ref.
Janet Mitchell	Grace	2006–2011, 2014–present	
Will Mitchell	Toby Walpole	2007–2012, 2014–present	
Will Mitchell	Freddie Phillips	2007–2012, 2014–present	
Ricky Branning	Henri Charles	2010, 2016–present	
Ricky Branning	Frankie Day	2010, 2016–present	
Tommy Moon	Shane White	2010–2016, 2018–present	
Tommy Moon	Ralfie White	2010–2016, 2018–present	
Tommy Moon	Shay Crotty	2010–2016, 2018–present	
Tommy Moon	Sonny Kendall	2010–2016, 2018–present	
Lexi Pearce	Dotti-Beau Cotterill	2012–2015, 2019–present	
Lexi Pearce	Isabella Brown	2012–2015, 2019–present	
Bert Moon	Freddie Beale	2014–2016, 2018–present	
Bert Moon	Stanley Beale	2014–2016, 2018–present	
Bert Moon	Elliot Briffett	2014–2016, 2018–present	
Ernie Moon	Freddie Beale	2014–2016, 2018–present	
Ernie Moon	Stanley Beale	2014–2016, 2018–present	
Ernie Moon	Cody Briffett	2014–2016, 2018–present	
Pearl Fox	Arayah Harris-Buckle	2015–present	
Ollie Carter	Jack Tilley	2015–2027	
Ollie Carter	Charlie Harrington	2015–2027	
Ollie Carter	Harry Farr	2015–2027	
Louie Beale	Oscar Winehouse	2015–2018, 2023–present	
Louie Beale	Freddie Harrington	2015–2018, 2023–present	
Louie Beale	Jake McNally	2015–2018, 2023–present	
Raymond Fox	Michael Jose Pomares Calixte	2017, 2020–present	
Mica Fox	Maylo Miller	2018–present	
Albie Watts	Arthur Gentleman	2020–present	
Annie Carter	Savannah Keir	2021–present	
Annie Carter	Lois Hawkins	2021–present	
Jordan Fox	Jahsaiah Williams	2021–present	
Charli Slater	Uncredited	2023–present	
Jimmy Beale	Uncredited	2025–present	
Mini Mo (cat)	Uncredited	2025–present	
Ethan Branning-Panesar	Uncredited	2026–present	
Ivy Knight-Mitchell	Uncredited	2026–present	
Ria Virdi	Aaria Sharma	2026–present	
Michael Carter	Uncredited	2026	

=== Named extras ===
Character	Actor(s)	Duration	Ref.
Tracey	Jane Slaughter	1985–present	
Winston	Ulric Browne	1985–present	
Marie Evans	Liz Sweet	2000–present	
Shrimpy	Ben Champniss	2014–present	
Beryl	Ninette Finch	2024–present	

== Cast changes ==
=== Departing characters ===
Character	Actor(s)	Ref.
Linda Carter	Kellie Bright	
Ollie Carter	Harry Farr	
Johnny Carter	Charlie Suff	
Nancy Carter	Maddy Hill	
Lee Carter	Danny Hatchard	
Ravi Gulati	Aaron Thiara	
Oscar Branning	Pierre Counihan-Moullier	
Janine Butcher	Charlie Brooks	
Gina Knight	Francesca Henry	
Davinder "Nugget" Gulati	Juhaim Rasul Choudhury	
Avani Nandra-Hart	Aaliyah James	

=== Future characters ===
Character	Actor(s)	Ref.
Megan Hawkins	TBA	

== Lists of characters by year of introduction ==
- 1985
- 1986
- 1987
- 1988
- 1989
- 1990
- 1991
- 1992
- 1993
- 1994
- 1995
- 1996
- 1997
- 1998
- 1999
- 2000
- 2001
- 2002
- 2003
- 2004
- 2005
- 2006
- 2007
- 2008
- 2009
- 2010
- 2011
- 2012
- 2013
- 2014
- 2015
- 2016
- 2017
- 2018
- 2019
- 2020
- 2021
- 2022
- 2023
- 2024
- 2025
- 2026
- 2027
