= Nicola Mitchell =

- EastEnders character
- Portrayed by: Laura Doddington
- Duration: 2024–present
- First appearance: Episode 7011; 11 November 2024
- Introduced by: Chris Clenshaw
In-universe information
- Occupation: Beautician; Career criminal; Businesswoman; Bar owner; Barmaid
- Family: Mitchell
- Father: Cliff Hawkins
- Mother: Rose Hawkins
- Sisters: Gemma Hawkins; Jodie Hawkins
- Husband: Teddy Mitchell (until 2024)
- Sons: Harry Mitchell; Barney Mitchell
- Daughters: Ivy Knight-Mitchell
- Grandsons: Ethan Branning-Panesar
- Nephews: Ryder Hawkins

Nicola Mitchell is a fictional character from the BBC soap opera EastEnders, portrayed by Laura Doddington. She made her first appearance on 11 November 2024, as the recent ex-wife of Teddy Mitchell (Roland Manookian) and mother of Harry (Elijah Holloway) and Barney Mitchell (Lewis Bridgeman).

Her early storylines in the show included her arrival and helping Harry get revenge on those behind his prison sentence, attempting rebuild bridges with her family and get back together with Teddy, her past fling with Zack Hudson (James Farrar), who unbeknownst to everyone was Barney's biological father, and gaining ownership of Walford's wine bar, Peggy's. The character's focus shifted to her attempts to win back Teddy and break him up with Sharon Watts (Letitia Dean) due to their growing relationship. The storyline saw her embark on a feud with Sharon, trying to encourage Phil Mitchell (Steve McFadden) to relapse his alcohol addiction to push Sharon back to him, the revelation that she murdered Harry's girlfriend Shireen Bashar, and flings with Jack Branning (Scott Maslen) and George Knight (Colin Salmon), with the latter resulting in an unplanned pregnancy and the premature birth of their daughter, Ivy. She later embarks on feuds with Ravi Gulati (Aaron Thiara), Ravi's stepmother Suki Panesar-Unwin (Balvinder Sopal), and her wife Eve Panesar-Unwin (Heather Peace).

Nicola has been portrayed as a headstrong and resilient mother, but with a more cunning and possessive side. Doddington grew up as a fan of the show, so was excited to be cast. The announcement of Nicola's arrival was released to press in early October 2024, after scenes aired alluding to her. Teasing how her character would arrive, Doddington commented that Nicola would come in "like the Tasmanian Devil". After her introduction, Nicola received positive reception for her strong personality and Doddington's performance, with Helen Daly of Radio Times calling the character a "breath of fresh air", and her colleague Lewis Knight declaring Nicola the best character introduced to the show in 2024.

== Development ==
=== Casting and creation ===
After being alluded to on several occasions, it was announced on 2 October 2024 that actress Laura Doddington had been cast as Nicola Mitchell, the ex-wife of recently established character Teddy Mitchell (Manookian) and mother of his sons Harry (Holloway) and Barney Mitchell (Bridgeman). Doddington explained that she was working in automated dialogue replacement when she received the call from her agent to tell her she had been cast. Having grown up as a fan, Doddington voiced her excitement to join the soap upon her character's announcement. She said she felt "like a kid at Christmas" to step onto the show's set, especially The Queen Victoria public house. She noted the set being smaller than she had imagined, commenting that it was "bizarre" but "exciting". Doddington considered herself lucky to be cast as a member of an extension to the soap's Mitchell family, as she enjoyed the company of her fellow actors. Adam Woodyatt, who portrays Ian Beale on the show, was assigned to Doddington as a mentor. She compared the working environment to that of a theatre company due to how encouraging the cast were to each other. Executive producer Chris Clenshaw expressed excitement to introduce Nicola and explore her dynamic with Teddy. It was confirmed that Doddington had begun filming prior to the announcement. Nicola is Doddington's second role in EastEnders, having previously portrayed the minor role of Barbara, a woman leading an antenatal class attended by Masood Ahmed (Nitin Ganatra) and Zainab Masood (Nina Wadia), for an episode in December 2009.

Her arrival was teased as both "a shock" and an annoyance for Teddy, as Nicola was set to quickly make a name for herself in the show's setting of Walford and try to rebuild bridges with her sons. Teddy's annoyance to be reacquainted with Nicola stemmed from his desire to have a fresh start with his sons, which her arrival would break the illusion of. Teasing her character's introduction, Doddington said that Nicola "comes in like the Tasmanian Devil". Spoilers teasing her debut said that she would create "a stir", and take quick dislikes to Sharon Watts (Letitia Dean) for flirting with Teddy, as well as Jack (Maslen) and Penny Branning (Kitty Castledine) for their respective roles in Harry's arrest. She was also teased to be hiding many secrets. The character made her first appearance in episode 7011, broadcast on 11 November 2024.

=== Characterisation ===
Nicola, on introduction, is Teddy's ex-wife. Discussing Nicola's personality, Clenshaw said that, like other female members of the Mitchell family, Nicola is "feisty, strong and loves her family". Laura-Jayne Tyler of Inside Soap billed Nicola as a "new mega-bitch" who would quickly have the remainder of Walford "at [her] mercy". Colleague Johnathon Hughes characterised Nicola as having "sass", "swagger", and "sarcasm". Doddington enjoyed portraying Nicola due to the character's "witty" nature, and described Nicola as a "confident powerhouse of a woman". The actress continued by explaining that after Nicola turned forty she stopped caring what people thought of her, noting how she is "not a people pleaser and isn't there to be liked". Press releases noted Nicola's determination to "stand her ground". Lewis Knight of Radio Times called her a "dynamic newcomer" and a "feisty new Mitchell matriarch". Colleague Laura Denby called the character "chaotic", "fiery", and "manipulative".

Doddington detailed that Nicola was very "protective" over her children, and was always ready and willing to "fight for them". Doddington was vocal about her appreciation for Nicola being a "complex woman" who is "strong and completely unapologetic about who she is". She also described her character as a "witty" and "intelligent" woman who "knows her mind and isn't intimidated by anyone or anything". Doddington noted Nicola's traits of preferring things to be easy and usually seeking opportunities to turn situations to her advantage. She concluded by detailing that "Nicola is not a woman's woman, and she's just not interested in women, not interested in female friendships, not interested in that support network". She further noted that Nicola is "used to getting what she wants", having never learned as a child not to expect such. Doddington detailed that a four-circle ring worn by Nicola represents her affinity for her family, and added that wearing it helped her get into character. Radio Times writer Helen Daly called the character a "fiery bombshell" and was surprised by Nicola's tendency to be a "troublemaker", noting that she had many "tricks up her sleeve".

=== Relationship with Teddy Mitchell ===
The character's backstory states that she and Teddy married young and discovered themselves while being together, before divorcing. Their lengthy history together lead them to gain the ability to "press each other's buttons" easily, being able to predict what would happen as a result. Regarding the character's relationship with Teddy, Clenshaw commented that they had a "complicated history". Doddington said that their divorce helped Nicola examine her behaviour, and that she wanted "her family back as a unit". She said that Nicola still harbored feelings for Teddy, despite the two being dysfunctional during their marriage, and Nicola's annoyance towards losing her ability to "manipulate" and stay "one step ahead" of Teddy. Doddington explained in an interview that Nicola was "bitter" about Teddy no longer returning her feelings, calling him "the love of her life" due to their long history. After learning of Teddy's flirtation with Sharon Watts (Dean), Doddington confirmed the characters would engage in a rivalry, explaining that Nicola and Sharon would "clash right away" as Nicola was determined to do "whatever it takes" to get Teddy back, so would try her best to "scupper" their growing relationship.

=== Opening Harry's Barn ===
After the show revealed that Nicola had gained ownership of the soap's wine bar following an agreement with Phil Mitchell (Steve McFadden), she decided to name it 'Harry's Barn' as a nod to her sons. The actress opined that Nicola's decision to name it after her children was her way of showing her love for them. When the day to open the bar came around, Doddington revealed Nicola was slightly nervous, as she wanted to prove herself to Teddy to show her independence. When asked what Nicola was aiming for in regards to the bar's aesthetic, Doddington responded that "it's always happy hour there" and Nicola intended for it to be one of the best drinking establishments in the entirety of London, envisioning the bar reaching further than the show's setting of Walford. The actress considered the set for Harry's Barn to be her favourite to film in.

=== Arrival of Nicola's extended family ===
In July 2026, it was announced that executive producer Ben Wadey would introduce Nicola's extended family, the Hawkins. Patricia Potter and Anna Constable were cast as Nicola's sisters, Gemma and Jodie Hawkins, respectively, with Marian McLoughlin cast as their mother, Rose Hawkins. 2027 will see the introduction of Nicola's niece, Megan Hawkins.

== Storylines ==
Nicola arrives in Walford after finding out about her son Harry's (Elijah Holloway) arrest for the murder of his girlfriend, Shireen Bashar and immediately confronts his fling, Penny Branning (Kitty Castledine), suspecting her involvement due to her father, Jack Branning (Scott Maslen) being a police officer. Nicola quickly provides Harry with a false alibi, getting him released, but tensions escalate as Teddy Mitchell (Roland Manookian), her estranged ex-husband, reveals that she had lied about being abroad and was actually in prison for injecting unlicensed filler and stealing from him. This revelation turns their son Barney (Lewis Bridgeman) against her, and as she leaves, Nicola tells Harry that Penny played a role in his arrest. While plotting revenge against Penny, Nicola encounters Zack Hudson (James Farrar), a former fling, and they agree to keep their past relationship secret from Teddy. After some persuasion, Teddy reluctantly allows Nicola to stay in the basement of the house. Nicola later realises that Teddy is attempting to strike a deal with Phil Mitchell (Steve McFadden) to purchase the local wine bar, but she manages to beat him to it, securing the deal to Teddy's frustration. She chooses the name 'Harry's Barn' as a nod to her sons.

Nicola grows resentful of Sharon Watts (Letitia Dean), due to Teddy expressing interest in her. Trying to distance Sharon from Teddy and bring her closer to her ex-husband Phil, Nicola attempts to push Phil, who is struggling with his mental health, into relapsing his alcohol addiction. The plan fails and Sharon is appalled after learning of her scheme while Nicola continues her attempts to seduce Teddy. She notices Jack's struggles with rekindling his relationship with ex-wife Denise Fox (Diane Parish) and has sex with him after flirting. Nicola and Jack agree to keep it a secret, but after being taunted by Penny, Nicola exposes their liaison in front of Denise. Zack works out he is Barney's biological father, based on Barney's blood type, and Nicola begs him not to tell Teddy. Barney tells Nicola that he overheard Sharon confessing that she cheated on Teddy with her ex-husband Grant Mitchell (Ross Kemp), which Nicola attempts to use as leverage against Zack revealing Barney's parentage; when Zack refuses to bow to this, Nicola has Zack attacked. Shortly afterwards, Barney informs Teddy that Sharon slept with Grant, ruining their relationship; Zack then considers revealing the truth to Barney, before Nicola warns him and Sharon off, claiming that Teddy is dangerous and that he murdered Shireen, not Harry. After Shireen's brother Asad Bashar (Aslam Amjad) visits Walford to confront Teddy, it is revealed that Nicola organised for Shireen to be murdered after she uncovered the truth about Barney's paternity.

When Teddy begins construction work on the industrial site where Shireen is buried, Nicola asks Benjamin "Benji" Haynes (Carl Prekopp) to move her body. Nicola confesses to Teddy, and when Benji demands £150,000 from them, Teddy calls the police who arrest Benji while he is attempting to move Shireen's body. The police later question Nicola, but Harry becomes suspicious and discovers the truth after threatening Teddy and Nicola with a crowbar. After learning from Penny that Shireen was pregnant when she died, Harry disowns his parents. Nicola then confesses to Teddy that she herself killed Shireen during an argument when she pushed her and she struck her head on a rock. Later, Nicola informs Zack of the truth regarding Shireen's death as a way of intimidating him into leaving Barney alone. While in a relationship with George Knight (Colin Salmon), in April 2026, Nicola suffers a placental abruption and gives birth to their daughter Ivy by emergency caeserean.

== Reception ==
For her role as Nicola, Doddington was shortlisted for Best Newcomer at the 2025 British Soap Awards. She was also longlisted for "Best Newcomer" at the 2025 Inside Soap Awards.

Nicola's "highly anticipated" arrival was called "dramatic" by Helen Daly of Radio Times. Her colleague, James Hibbs, agreed, writing: "Albert Square has seen a dramatic entrance of a fiery newcomer, as Teddy Mitchell's ex-wife made a big arrival in EastEnders". Fellow writer Laura Denby similarly praised the character's "eventful" introduction, noting appreciation for a joke Nicola made about Teddy's outfit, and that Doddington "delivered a powerful performance", adding that she was excited to see what future stories were to come for the character. Angie Quinn of Manchester Evening News reported that fans of the soap were "obsessed" with the character after her arrival, and noted examples of viewers "confessing their love" for the character via Twitter. The reveal of Nicola's past affair with Zack was deemed "scandalous" by Lewis Knight of Radio Times. Joe Anderton of Digital Spy billed the character as "Walford's new drama queen". At the end of Nicola's first week on the show, Daly wrote that she had been "a breath of fresh air". Laura-Jayne Tyler of Inside Soap labelled the arrival of Nicola a "bullseye", and deemed the character "bloomin' brilliant". She continued by praising Doddington's casting and called Nicola "the shot in the arm the extended Mitchell clan had been needing". Writing for Inside Soap, Johnathon Hughes commented that she "became an instant icon in the making" from her first minutes on-screen. Hughes noted his praise for Nicola and Sharon's rivalry.

Nicola's attempted plan to push Phil into relapse as a method of driving Sharon closer to him than Teddy was called "evil" by Erin Zammitt of Digital Spy. Lewis Knight of Radio Times listed Nicola as one of eight EastEnders characters he hoped would be central to the show in 2025. He called Nicola the best character the show introduced in 2024, and wrote that Doddington was a "magnetic presence". He continued by voicing hopes that the show would continue to "mine her dark past, her toxic pursuit of ex-husband Teddy, her lioness instincts with her sons, and her rivalries with other long-standing characters". Colleague Denby praised a "glorious tribute" to the former character Peggy Mitchell (Barbara Windsor) through a line delivered by Nicola. The line in question, "Get out of my club", which Nicola exclaimed while kicking people out of Harry's Barn, referenced Peggy's catchprase "Get out of my pub", prompting Denby to wonder if Nicola would become a centrepiece of the Mitchell family, just as Peggy was.
