= List of EastEnders characters introduced in 2026 =

EastEnders logo

EastEnders is a BBC soap opera that first aired on 19 February 1985. This is a list of characters who have debuted or are set to debut in 2026. All characters are introduced by the serial's executive producer, Ben Wadey.

The first characters to debut in 2026 are Ethan Branning-Panesar and Bea Pollard (Ronni Ancona), who made their first appearances in January. Dawn Steele debuted in March, portraying Sandra Goodwin, the adoptive mother of Josh Goodwin (Joshua Vaughan). In April, Ivy Knight-Mitchell, the newborn daughter of Nicola Mitchell (Laura Doddington) and George Knight (Colin Salmon), was introduced. Bruce (Tyler Kinhorn), the probation officer for Eddie Knight (Christopher Fairbank), debuted in May, followed by gangster Russell Delaney (Anthony Skordi). Sheila Atkins (Sheila Ruskin), the grandmother of serial killer Gray Atkins (Toby-Alexander Smith), first appeared in June, as well as Ria Virdi (Aaria Sharma), the foster daughter of Suki (Balvinder Sopal) and Eve Panesar-Unwin (Heather Peace). In July, the arrivals of DC Craig Ingram (Matthew James-Bailey) and Clive Masters (Jason Durr) took place. August introduced Nicola's extended family, the Hawkins. This introduction began with her sisters, Gemma (Patricia Potter) and Jodie (Anna Constable), along with their mother Rose (Marian McLoughlin). They were later joined by Gemma's husband, Ned (Jamie Bamber), and their son, Ryder Hawkins (Felix Uff). Additionally, Darnell Larson Jr (Christopher Colquhoun), the long-lost half-brother of Denise Fox (Diane Parish), and his daughter, Grace Larson (Krysstina Frempong), were also introduced. In November, Michael Carter was introduced. In addition to the aforementioned arrivals, several other characters appear throughout the year.

== Ethan Branning-Panesar ==
Ethan Branning-Panesar
- EastEnders character
- First appearance: 1 January 2026 (Note: Ethan Branning-Panesar first appeared during the New Year's Day 2027 flash-forward episode, which broadcast on 1 January 2026. He was re-introduced during the 16 September 2026 episode.)
- Introduced by: Ben Wadey
In-universe information
- Family: Mitchell; Branning
- Father: Harry Mitchell; Vinny Panesar (legal)
- Mother: Penny Branning
- Grandfathers: Teddy Mitchell; Jack Branning
- Grandmothers: Nicola Mitchell; Suki Panesar (legal); Selina Branning
- Uncles: Barney Mitchell; Ricky Branning; James Branning
- Aunts: Amy Mitchell; Ivy Knight-Mitchell
- Other relatives: Max Branning; Lauren Branning; Oscar Branning; Annie Carter; Louie Beale; Jimmy Beale

Ethan Branning-Panesar is the son of Harry Mitchell (Elijah Holloway) and Penny Branning (Kitty Castledine). He first appeared during the 1 January 2026 episode, which served as a flash-forward episode to New Year's Day 2027, during which his parentage was not revealed. Following his birth on 16 September 2026, Penny's son was revealed to be Ethan upon his naming. Metro's Megan Folen described the moment as a "seemingly sweet family moment [that] carries much greater significance".

Harry and Penny have a one-night-stand shortly before she begins dating Vinny Panesar (Shiv Jalota), and when Penny learns she is pregnant, Vinny believes he is the father. At Ethan's naming ceremony, in accordance to Vinny's Sikh faith, his mother Suki Panesar (Balvinder Sopal) announces that the baby's name should begin with the letter E. Penny's father Jack Branning (Scott Maslen) suggests the name Ethan. After hearing many comments from neighbours suggesting that Ethan has no resemblance to Vinny, Penny's deception begins to eat her up. An insider told Digital Spy: "Penny has committed to making Vinny believe Ethan is his son, despite her doubts he might be Harry’s. This deception is eating away at Penny – especially when people start making pointed comments that make her feel ashamed." After previously believing that telling Vinny the truth was the best thing, she changed her mind after seeing Vinny with Ethan for the first time.

== Bea Pollard ==
Bea Pollard, played by Ronni Ancona, made her first appearance on 7 January 2026. Of her casting, Ancona said, "I am honoured to have been invited to join the iconic institution that is EastEnders, and to go on this whirlwind of a journey with such an unpredictable, nuanced and complex character as Bea. I hope audiences have as much fun watching her as I have had bringing her to life". Bea is introduced as an old school acquaintance of established character Linda Carter (Kellie Bright); the pair meet at a school reunion and it is revealed that the pair have very different recollections of their experiences at school. It was also teased that Bea would settle into Walford and would end up being at "the heart of the drama" and leaving a "lasting impression" on the characters she encounters.

Throughout her tenure, Bea has been shown to be a mentally unhinged, desperate and vulnerable person who reshapes herself into different versions of herself to please others. One of her major storyline arcs has included becoming obsessed with Honey Mitchell (Emma Barton) and attempting to steal her identity by moving in with her, getting the same job as her, taking out a credit card in her name and committing credit card fraud and dressing identically. She also endures a short-lived relationship with Ian Beale (Adam Woodyatt) until he discovers her crimes. Bea has been noted as a polarising character and has sparked discussion between viewers and critics about her intentions. The Metro has noted that some viewers love her, while some hate her, and she has dubbed "bizarre Bea", "Walford's weirdest" and "bonkers Bea". The character was the subject of viral posts in March 2025 when an anonymous person phoned into the Channel 5 chat show Vanessa impersonating Bea.

== Sandra Goodwin ==
Sandra Goodwin
- EastEnders character
- Portrayed by: Dawn Steele
- First appearance: Episode 7296; 17 March 2026
- Last appearance: Episode 7345; 10 June 2026
- Introduced by: Ben Wadey
In-universe information
- Brothers: Ted
- Husband: Keith Goodwin (backstory)
- Adoptive sons: Josh Goodwin

Sandra Goodwin, played by Dawn Steele, first appeared in Episode 7296, broadcast on 17 March 2026. She is the adoptive mother of Josh Goodwin (Joshua Vaughan). Steele's casting was announced on 4 March 2026. Sandra arrives in Walford seeking answers about Jasmine Fisher (Indeyarna Donaldson-Holness), Josh's biological twin sister and her former foster daughter, after she sees on the news that Jasmine has killed her and Josh's biological father, Anthony Trueman (Nicholas Bailey). When Sandra arrives in Walford, Josh follows her, unbeknownst his birth family are in the area.

Steele was contracted on a guest contract. Speaking on her casting, she said: "I was thrilled to be asked to play the role of Sandra who arrives and throws a spanner or two into the Square!". She was impressed by Sandra's characterisation and the storyline, hoping viewers would be "thrilled with another piece of the puzzle ahead of [Jasmine's] trial". Steele previously portrayed Ange Godard on fellow BBC series Holby City, which was filmed at BBC Elstree Centre; the same place where EastEnders is filmed. Of this, Steele said: "It was so great to go back to Elstree after the end of Holby City. Lots of the same crew (and a few cast!) are still there so it was joyful to see them all again. Everyone was so welcoming and I really enjoyed learning new ways of filming, it really is a well-oiled machine, and everyone works so hard."

== Ivy Knight-Mitchell ==
Ivy Knight-Mitchell
- EastEnders character
- Portrayed by: Uncredited
- First appearance: Episode 7306; 2 April 2026
- Introduced by: Ben Wadey
In-universe information
- Father: George Knight
- Mother: Nicola Mitchell
- Half-brothers: Junior Knight; Harry Mitchell; Barney Mitchell
- Half-sisters: Gina Knight; Anna Knight
- Grandfathers: Eddie Knight (adoptive)
- Grandmothers: Rose Hawkins

Ivy Knight-Mitchell is the daughter of Nicola Mitchell (Laura Doddington) and George Knight (Colin Salmon), introduced during Episode 7306, broadcast on 2 April 2026. Ivy's birth was written into the soap as a "harrowing storyline" since she is born prematurely. EastEnders sought advice from British infancy charity Bliss to present the storyline accurately and sensitively. The story sees Nicola and George "navigate an emotionally challenging and unexpected turn in their co-parenting journey". Due to complications with her birth, Ivy is delivered through Nicola undergoing an emergency caesarean.

Executive producer Wadey felt it important to show the challenges and concerns of neonatal care with a premature baby, as well as the impact it has on Ivy's family. Annelies Hopkins, information and support manager at Bliss, hoped the storyline would show what it means to have a baby prematurely. She explained: "As the UK's leading charity representing babies born premature or sick [...] we were grateful to be consulted on this important EastEnders storyline, which shines a light on the unexpected, distressing and often traumatic experience of having a baby in neonatal care."

== Bruce ==
Bruce, portrayed by Tyler Kinghorn, is the probation officer of Eddie Knight (Christopher Fairbank), who appeared in two episodes airing 7 and 11 May 2026. He appeared as Nicola Mitchell (Laura Doddington) allowed him to stay with her and his adopted son George Knight (Colin Salmon), whose biological father Eddie murdered. Bruce visited Nicola ahead of Eddie moving in. On 15 May 2026, Kinghorn announced his departure from the soap on his Instagram. He posted a series of screenshots of his time on Albert Square with the caption: "Had a wonderful time and experience playing Bruce on my TV Debut, on BBC One and looking forward to what the future holds."

== Russell Delaney ==
Russell Delaney
- EastEnders character
- Portrayed by: Anthony Skordi
- First appearance: Episode 7310; 13 May 2026
- Last appearance: Episode 7333; 20 May 2026
- Introduced by: Ben Wadey
In-universe information
- Occupation: Gangland Boss
- Wife: Joanne Delaney

Russell Delaney, portrayed by Anthony Skordi, is the crime boss of Mark Fowler Jr (Stephen Aaron-Sipple) mentioned indirectly multiple times the prior year with connections to established characters Nicola Mitchell (Laura Doddington) and Ravi Gulati (Aaron Thiara). Skordi's casting was announced on 12 May 2026 and was described as a "ruthless crime boss" by Michael Adams from Radio Times. He also described Russell to be "plaguing Mark off-screen for months". Delaney first appeared on 13 May 2026 after having his cronies bundle Mark into a car. Regarding Delaney's casting, Adams revealed: "Soap fans will meet Russell later this week, and he'll reappear again prior to Nigel Bates's (Paul Bradley) funeral, as news reaches Albert Square that Mark has seemingly vanished into thin air."

Russell first appears after being contacted by Grant Mitchell (Ross Kemp), who Russell knew in the 1990s alongside his siblings Phil (Steve McFadden) and Sam (Kim Medcalf), due to his son Mark (Stephen Aaron-Sipple) previously working Russell and now owes him £100k. Grant attempts to get Mark more time but his attitude angers Russell, who punches Grant for previously sleeping with his wife Joanne. Grant punches Russell to the floor and makes it clear Mark won't anything just as Phil interrupts, leading Russell to double Mark's debt and threatening to kill Mark if he doesn't pay on time. The next day, Russell breaks into the house of Mark's sister Vicki Fowler (Alice Haig) and threatens her, informing Vicki about Mark's troubles and warning her he has a week to pay him.

== Sheila Atkins ==
Sheila Atkins
- EastEnders character
- Portrayed by: Sheila Ruskin
- First appearance: Episode 7350; 18 June 2026
- Last appearance: Episode 7382; 13 August 2026
- Introduced by: Ben Wadey
In-universe information
- Sons: Alex Atkins
- Grandsons: Gray Atkins
- Other relatives: Mia Atkins; Mackenzie Atkins; Jordan Fox

Sheila Atkins, portrayed by Sheila Ruskin, is the grandmother of Gray Atkins (Toby-Alexander Smith) who first appeared in episode 7350, broadcast on 18 June 2026. Ruskin's casting was announced on 9 June and her character would appear as part of Gray's return storyline. Sheila meets up with Gray's ex-wife, Chelsea Fox (Zaraah Abrahams) and her half-sister Libby (Belinda Owusu) after the former admits that Sheila has sent Chelsea many cheques that she has never cashed for their son, Jordan Fox (Jahsaiah Williams), who has recently undergone life-saving surgery on his spine after a road accident. Adams from Radio Times reported: "After some support from Libby, Chelsea bravely meets with Sheila and is relieved to hear that she's no longer in touch with Gray." He continued: "Sheila offers to help Jordan financially, and although Chelsea initially accepts the cash, she's left guilt-ridden and returns it."

== Ria Virdi ==
Ria Virdi
- EastEnders character
- Portrayed by: Aaria Sharma
- First appearance: Episode 7354; 25 June 2026
- Introduced by: Ben Wadey
In-universe information
- Mother: Harleen Virdi
- Adoptive mother: Suki Panesar (foster); Eve Panesar-Unwin (foster)

Ria Virdi, portrayed by Aaria Sharma, is introduced as the foster daughter of Suki (Balvinder Sopal) and Eve Panesar-Unwin (Heather Peace) who first appeared in episode 7354, broadcast on 25 June 2026. She first appears when Suki and Eve's adopting agent Robin Dawson (Alistair Cope) brings her to meet them. Sharma's casting was announced via an Instagram post on 18 June 2026 by her talent agency TTA Kids with the caption: "Welcome to Albert Square Aaria!"

An EastEnders insider told Digital Spy: "It looks like Suki and Eve's dream is finally coming true, as young girl Ria is placed in their care! After a dramatic week, packed with twists and turns, the couple get the chance to be mums together at last." They continued: "Things don't go entirely smoothly to begin with, but Suki and Eve are putting on a united front and are totally focused on building their new family."

== Cleo Marshall ==
Cleo Marshall
- EastEnders character
- Portrayed by: Mazz Murray
- First appearance: Episode 7366; 16 July 2026
- Last appearance: Episode 7367; 17 July 2026
- Introduced by: Ben Wadey
In-universe information
- Husband: Ross Marshall (backstory); Matt (2025–present)
- Sons: Joel Marshall

Cleo Marshall, portrayed by Mazz Murray, is the ex-wife of Ross Marshall (Alex Walkinshaw) and the mother of Joel Marshall (Max Murray). She arrived in Albert Square on 16 July 2026 after Joel was released from a young offenders institute, where he has served a six-month sentence for violently attacking his stepmother, Vicki Fowler (Alice Haig). Mazz's casting was announced two days prior, and she is the real-life aunt of Max Murray, who portrays Joel Marshall. As Cleo arrives and Joel is released, Ross and Vicki return to Albert Square after spending their honeymoon in Florida, with the shock of the news that Joel cannot live with her despite previous arrangements. This puts a strain on Ross and Vicki's relationship. Adams from Radio Times revealed that this would be a guest role and Mazz would only appear in two episodes.

Speaking about her casting, Mazz said: "It was so wonderful to be part of these EastEnders episodes as we delve into Joel's familial past, and my experience was made all the better working alongside my talented, gorgeous nephew Max. And also, my childhood school friend Alex Walkinshaw playing [Ross] my ex-husband!"

== Craig Ingram ==
Craig Ingram, portrayed by Matthew James-Bailey, is a detective constable who first appeared on 20 July 2026. He first appears when assigned to help Jack Branning (Scott Maslen) out when his superiors suspect that he is struggling to balance his workload with supporting his partner, Denise Fox (Diane Parish), through her cancer battle. James-Bailey's casting was announced on 11 July 2026 and it was confirmed that his character would be part of a major police storyline. James-Bailey is known for his previous soap role as series regular Ethan Williams in Channel 4 soap opera Hollyoaks between 2021 and 2024. He was killed off during the 5 November 2026 episode.

James-Bailey described his casting as a dream come true. He continued: "From it being the soundtrack to my childhood, always on in the background at home, to gathering around the TV with my family every Christmas, being able to play even a small part in such an iconic piece of British television is truly surreal." Executive producer Wadey spoke of James-Bailey's casting: "We're delighted to welcome Matthew to EastEnders, and he has been a fantastic addition to the cast. Craig's presence in Walford forms part of a storyline involving the Brannings that will unfold this summer."

In September 2026, it was announced that Craig would be involved in a storyline exploring the "reality of grooming", in which he grooms a teenage Amy Mitchell (Ellie Dadd). For this storyline, the serial announced a collaboration with the charities Barnardo's and the End Violence Against Women Coalition (EVAW), as well as experts in the field of sexual grooming, to address the issue effectively. Wadey noted the significance of accurate storytelling when addressing the sensitive subject matter and expressed appreciation for the opportunity to collaborate with Barnardo's and EVAW. In separate statements, Lynn Perry from Barnardo's and Janaya Walker from EVAW acknowledged the opportunity to partner with EastEnders, offering their joint expertise to enhance understanding of the issue through the storyline.

== Clive Masters ==
Clive Masters, portrayed by Jason Durr, is a local councillor who builds up a friendship with Linda Carter (Kellie Bright). Durr's casting was announced on 4 July 2026 and his character was introduced in July as part of a storyline to save the Walford Community Centre from redevelopment. Joe Anderton of Digital Spy revealed: "In upcoming scenes, Walford residents band together to save the centre, with Linda leading the charge. Supportive councillor Clive joins her, and the two strike up a friendship. But Linda soon realises that they've got some real chemistry." Upon his announcement, Durr had already begun filming for his role as Clive. Durr is known for his previous roles in long-running dramas Heartbeat between 1997 and 2003, and Casualty between 2016 and 2023.

Durr spoke about his casting: "Few shows command their place in the national conversation quite like EastEnders, so I'm delighted to be joining the cast as Clive Masters. Working with the wonderful Kellie Bright has been an absolute joy and pleasure from day one." He continued: "All the cast, crew and production staff have been incredibly generous, welcoming and good humoured. I'm excited for audiences to meet Clive and see what's in store."

== Gemma Hawkins ==
Gemma Hawkins
- EastEnders character
- Portrayed by: Patricia Potter
- First appearance: Episode 7383; 17 August 2026
- Introduced by: Ben Wadey
In-universe information
- Occupation: Hairdresser
- Father: Cliff Hawkins
- Mother: Rose Hawkins
- Sisters: Nicola Mitchell; Jodie Hawkins
- Husband: Ned Hawkins
- Sons: Ryder Hawkins
- Nephews: Harry Mitchell; Barney Mitchell

Gemma Hawkins, portrayed by former Holby City star Patricia Potter, is the older sister of Nicola Mitchell (Laura Doddington), made her first appearance during Episode 7383, broadcast on 17 August 2026. Potter's casting was announced on 31 July. The serial had previously teased the arrival of Nicola's extended family after she shared a call with Gemma in the episode airing 30 July 2026. The soap also shared a teaser the same day, posting a photo of suitcases and boxes with "Hawkins family" written on them. The arrival of the Hawkins family is due to open "old wounds and complicated family dynamics" and is "set to make an explosive impact on the Square".

Gemma arrives in Walford as she speeds and crashes into a peacock statue outside of Elaine Peacock's (Harriet Thorpe) bed and breakfast. She seeks Nicola's help in dealing with a man named Leo, who is being abusive to Gemma's daughter, Megan.

Executive producer Ben Wadey described the Hawkins family to be a "fantastic addition to Walford". He explained: "While the family share a fierce loyalty to one another, decades of complicated history and Nicola's estrangement from them has left fractures within the family that are far from healed. We’re all very excited for what we have planned for the family, and we can’t wait for the audience to meet them." Potter also said she was "so delighted to be joining this iconic show as part of a new family" and that "a joy and a privilege to be working with such talented actors and wonderful people". She further expressed her excitement and gratitude for the role and her casting.

== Jodie Hawkins ==
Jodie Hawkins
- EastEnders character
- Portrayed by: Anna Constable
- First appearance: Episode 7383; 17 August 2026
- Introduced by: Ben Wadey
In-universe information
- Father: Cliff Hawkins
- Mother: Rose Hawkins
- Sisters: Gemma Hawkins; Nicola Mitchell
- Nephews: Harry Mitchell; Barney Mitchell; Ryder Hawkins

Jodie Hawkins, portrayed by Anna Constable, is the younger sister of established character Nicola Mitchell (Laura Doddington) and Gemma Hawkins (Patricia Potter), made her first appearance during Episode 7383, broadcast on 17 August 2026. Constable's casting was announced on 31 July. The serial previously teased the arrival of Nicola's extended family after she shared a call with Gemma in the episode airing 30 July 2026. The soap also shared a teaser the same day posting a photo of suitcases and boxes with "Hawkins family" written on them. Jodie's arrival alongside her other family members is due to open "old wounds and complicated family dynamics" and are "set to make an explosive impact on the Square".

Executive producer Ben Wadey described the Hawkins family to be a "fantastic addition to Walford". He explained: "While the family share a fierce loyalty to one another, decades of complicated history and Nicola's estrangement from them has left fractures within the family that are far from healed. We’re all very excited for what we have planned for the family, and we can’t wait for the audience to meet them." Constable spoke of her casting: "Growing up watching EastEnders I never thought a disabled actress like me could ever land a role like this. But here I am loud and proud and taking no prisoners in mine or Jodie's wake."

== Rose Hawkins ==
Rose Hawkins
- EastEnders character
- Portrayed by: Marian McLoughlin
- First appearance: Episode 7383; 17 August 2026
- Introduced by: Ben Wadey
In-universe information
- Husband: Cliff Hawkins (backstory)
- Daughters: Gemma Hawkins; Nicola Mitchell; Jodie Hawkins
- Grandsons: Harry Mitchell; Barney Mitchell; Ryder Hawkins
- Granddaughters: Ivy Knight-Mitchell

Rose Hawkins, portrayed by Marian McLoughlin, is the mother of Nicola Mitchell (Laura Doddington) who arrived alongside her two other daughters, Gemma Hawkins (Patricia Potter), and Jodie Hawkins (Anna Constable), made her first appearance during Episode 7383, broadcast on 17 August 2026. McLoughlin's casting was announced on 31 July of the same year. The show had previously teased the arrival of Nicola's extended family after she shared a call with Gemma in the episode airing 30 July 2026. The soap also shared a teaser the same day posting a photo of suitcases and boxes with "Hawkins family" written on them. Rose's arrival is due to open "old wounds and complicated family dynamics" and are "set to make an explosive impact on the Square".

Executive producer Ben Wadey described the Hawkins family to be a "fantastic addition to Walford". He explained: "While the family share a fierce loyalty to one another, decades of complicated history and Nicola's estrangement from them has left fractures within the family that are far from healed. We’re all very excited for what we have planned for the family, and we can’t wait for the audience to meet them." McLouglin spoke of her casting: "I feel so lucky to be joining such a brilliant cast and I can’t wait for the viewers to meet the Hawkins family. Now in my 70s, this is an opportunity I never expected, and I am incredibly grateful to be part of such a cherished drama."

== Darnell Larson Jr ==
Darnell Larson Jr
- EastEnders character
- Portrayed by: Christopher Colquhoun
- First appearance: Episode 7388; 25 August 2026
- Introduced by: Ben Wadey
In-universe information
- Half-sisters: Denise Fox
- Wife: Louisa Larson (backstory)
- Daughters: Grace Larson
- Nephews: Raymond Fox
- Nieces: Chelsea Fox; Libby Fox
- Other relatives: Jordan Fox

Darnell Larson Jr is the half-brother of Denise Fox (Diane Parish), played by Christopher Colquhoun, who made his first appearance during Episode 7388, broadcast on 25 August 2026. Colquhoun's casting was announced on 11 August 2026.

On joining EastEnders, Colquhoun playfully referred to his casting as a "doof doof moment" for him. Executive producer Wadey detailed the arrival of Darnell as one that will serve as a "new branch" for the Fox and Trueman families.

== Grace Larson ==
Grace Larson
- EastEnders character
- Portrayed by: Krysstina Frempong
- First appearance: Episode 7389; 26 August 2026
- Introduced by: Ben Wadey
In-universe information
- Father: Darnell Larson Jr
- Mother: Louisa Larson
- Aunts: Denise Fox
- First cousins: Chelsea Fox; Libby Fox; Raymond Fox

Grace Larson is the daughter of Darnell Larson Jr (Christopher Colquhoun) and the niece of Denise Fox (Diane Parish), portrayed by Krysstina Frempong, who made her first appearance during Episode 7389, broadcast on 26 August 2026. Frempong's casting was announced on 11 August 2026.

Frempong expressed her excitement for joining EastEnders, stating: "I have watched the show for as long as I can remember and have such vivid memories of gathering around the TV with my family, especially at Christmas, to watch all the drama unfolding on the Square, so it feels pretty surreal to now be a part of the action!" She referred to the experience of joining the cast as a surreal one and previewed the "complexities" she feels Grace will bring to the canvas. Executive producer Wadey detailed the arrival of Grace as one that will provide a "wider family network" for the canvas.

== Ryder Hawkins ==
Ryder Hawkins
- EastEnders character
- Portrayed by: Felix Uff
- First appearance: Episode 7391; 31 August 2026
- Introduced by: Ben Wadey
In-universe information
- Father: Ned Hawkins
- Mother: Gemma Hawkins
- Grandmothers: Rose Hawkins
- Aunts: Nicola Mitchell; Jodie Hawkins
- First cousins: Harry Mitchell; Barney Mitchell

Ryder Hawkins, portrayed by Felix Uff, is the son of Gemma Hawkins (Patricia Potter) and Ned Hawkins (Jamie Bamber), who made his first appearance during Episode 7391, broadcast on 31 August 2026. His casting was announced on 31 July. The serial previously teased the arrival of Nicola Mitchell's (Laura Doddington) extended family after she shared a call with Gemma in the episode airing 30 July 2026. The soap also shared a teaser the same day posting a photo of suitcases and boxes with "Hawkins family" written on them. The family's arrival is due to open "old wounds and complicated family dynamics" and are "set to make an explosive impact on the Square".

Executive producer Ben Wadey described the Hawkins family to be a "fantastic addition to Walford". He explained: "While the family share a fierce loyalty to one another, decades of complicated history and Nicola's estrangement from them has left fractures within the family that are far from healed. We’re all very excited for what we have planned for the family, and we can’t wait for the audience to meet them." Uff spoke of his casting: "EastEnders is a staple of British culture and it’s a real privilege to join the cast. I can’t wait for everyone to see the Hawkins family shaking things up!"

== Ned Hawkins ==
Ned Hawkins
- EastEnders character
- Portrayed by: Jamie Bamber
- First appearance: Episode 7391; 31 August 2026
- Introduced by: Ben Wadey
In-universe information
- Other names: Ned Roper
- Occupation: Therapist; Military (back story)
- Wife: Gemma Hawkins
- Sons: Ryder Hawkins

Ned Hawkins (also Roper), portrayed by Jamie Bamber, is the husband of Gemma Hawkins (Patricia Potter) and father of Ryder Hawkins (Felix Uff), who made his first appearance during Episode 7391, broadcast on 31 August 2026. His casting was announced on 31 July 2026 and that he would be a member of Nicola Mitchell's (Laura Doddington) extended family. The show had previously teased the arrival of Nicola's extended family after she shared a call with Gemma in the episode airing 30 July 2026. The soap also shared a teaser the same day posting a photo of suitcases and boxes with "Hawkins family" written on them. The family's arrival is due to open "old wounds and complicated family dynamics" and are "set to make an explosive impact on the Square". Ned is a former member of the military who has retrained as a therapist specialising in the treatment of individuals with PTSD. His arrival in Walford is expected to create tension with Nicola.

Executive producer Ben Wadey described the Hawkins family to be a "fantastic addition to Walford". He explained: "While the family share a fierce loyalty to one another, decades of complicated history and Nicola's estrangement from them has left fractures within the family that are far from healed. We’re all very excited for what we have planned for the family, and we can’t wait for the audience to meet them." Bamber spoke about his casting: "It’s a privilege I don’t take lightly, and I’m thrilled to be making my mark on this crown jewel of my beloved BBC." He continued: "When 12-year-old me rushed home from school in 1985 to catch the very first episode of EastEnders, I could never have dreamed that one day I’d be walking onto the iconic Albert Square as a character myself." Bamber further teased a connection between Ned and Alfie Moon (Shane Richie), stating: "You find out very quickly that there's only two people he really knows, and that's Nicola and Alfie. But he doesn't know Alfie's the publican and that's a surprise to him." Ned's prior experience with bombs will come in handy, Wadey teased ahead of the character's debut.

== Jess Fang ==
Jess Fang, portrayed by Emma Lau, is the ex-girlfriend of Lee Carter (Danny Hatchard) and the mother of their son, Michael, for whom Lee's sister Nancy Carter (Maddy Hill) acted as a surrogate. She first appeared during Episode 7423, broadcast on 26 October 2026. Lau's casting was announced on 20 October. Jess's arrival brings the revelation of Lee's drinking following Mick Carter's (Danny Dyer) death, and is what caused her to leave Lee. Hatchard previewed that Jess's arrival would bring a shocking accusation that would create upheaval in the Carter family and Albert Square.

== Michael Carter ==
Michael Carter
- EastEnders character
- First appearance: 12 November 2026
- Introduced by: Ben Wadey
In-universe information
- Father: Lee Carter
- Mother: Jess Fang
- Grandfathers: Mick Carter
- Grandmothers: Linda Carter
- Uncles: Johnny Carter; Ollie Carter
- Aunts: Nancy Carter; Annie Carter; Frankie Lewis
- Other relatives: Elaine Peacock

Michael Carter is the son of Lee Carter (Danny Hatchard) and Jess Fang (Emma Lau). He was conceived through surrogacy, with Lee's sister Nancy Carter (Maddy Hill) as surrogate. Michael was introduced on 12 November 2026. Prior to his birth, Lee had been struggling with a drinking problem, similar to the alcoholism experienced by his mother Linda Carter (Kellie Bright). On the day of Michael's birth, the family are led to believe that Lee's father, Mick Carter (Danny Dyer), had died from a heart attack two weeks prior, after being deceived by Mick's wife, Janine Butcher (Charlie Brooks), in an attempt to access his life insurance. After Nancy gives birth, Lee reveals to his family that the baby will be named Michael, in Mick's honour.

== Other characters ==
Character	Portrayer(s)	Episode date(s)	Details	Ref
Marcus	Neil Haigh	8, 12 January 2026, 1 July 2026	The landlord of Bea Pollard (Ronni Ancona) who evicts Bea from his flat when she cannot find her keys. Linda Carter (Kellie Bright) and Honey Mitchell (Emma Barton) arrive with her keys, which Honey mistakenly took, but he refuses to let her stay. Billy Mitchell (Perry Fenwick) visits him several months later after Bea has terrorised him and spread lies about him. Marcus puts him into contact with Ruth (Rachael Spence), whose life was also affected by Bea's actions.	
Ruth	Rachael Spence	2 July 2026	A former friend of Bea Pollard (Ancona). She meets Honey Mitchell (Barton) and Nicola Mitchell (Laura Doddington) and confides in them about Bea. She reveals that she befriended Bea and moved her in, but after getting jealous of Ruth's marriage, Bea set fire to their house and killed their dog.	
