= Krysstina Frempong =

English actress (born 2002)

- Born: Krysstina Katherine K. Frempong; 20 February 2002 (age 24); Waltham Forest, Essex, England
- Occupation: Actress
- Years active: 2019–present
- Television: EastEnders

Krysstina Katherine K. Frempong (born 20 February 2002) is an English actress. She appeared in various short films before graduating from the London Academy of Music and Dramatic Art and joining the cast of BBC soap opera EastEnders in 2026 as Grace Larson.

== Life and career ==
Krysstina Katherine K. Frempong was born on 20 February 2002 in Waltham Forest, Essex. In 2019, she appeared in the short films Idle Interactions and Depth of Field. Between 2021 and 2024, she studied at the London Academy of Music and Dramatic Art, graduating with a BA Hons. During her training, she appeared in the short films Essex Girls (2023) and Ouroboros (2024). In 2025, she appeared in an episode of the Netflix series Too Much. Her stage credits include Home, Saturday Night Sunday Morning, Alice, A Profoundly Affectionate, Passionate Devotion to Someone..., Measure for Measure, Three Sisters, The Visit, A Raisin in the Sun and The Trojan Women.

In August 2026, it was announced that Frempong would be joining the cast of the BBC soap opera EastEnders as Grace Larson, the daughter of Darnell Larson Jr., who was introduced as the long-lost half brother of Denise Fox (Diane Parish). Speaking about joining the show, Frempong said: "I am extremely excited to be joining EastEnders! I have watched the show for as long as I can remember and have such vivid memories of gathering around the TV with my family, especially at Christmas, to watch all the drama unfolding on the Square, so it feels pretty surreal to now be a part of the action! I'm really looking forward to working with, and learning from my new colleagues, whom I've long admired, and hope audiences enjoy getting to know Grace and all the complexities she'll bring to their screens!".

== Credits ==
=== Film and television ===
| Year | Title | Role | Notes | Ref. |
|---|---|---|---|---|
| 2019 | Idle Interactions | Cynthia | Short film | |
| 2019 | Depth of Field | Civilian in Warzone #7 | Short film | |
| 2023 | Essex Girls | Tiyah | Short film | |
| 2024 | Ouroboros | Frankie | Short film | |
| 2025 | Too Much | Drunk Record Store Girl #2 | Episode: "To Doubt a Boy" | |
| 2026 | EastEnders | Grace Larson | Regular role | |

=== Stage ===
| Title | Role | Ref. |
|---|---|---|
| Home | A Young Woman / Young Mum's Sister | |
| Saturday Night Sunday Morning | Jackie | |
| Alice | Alice | |
| A Profoundly Affectionate, Passionate Devotion to Someone... | Young Woman | |
| Measure for Measure | Isabella / Overdone | |
| Three Sisters | Masha | |
| The Visit | Claire Zachanassian | |
| A Raisin in the Sun | Ruth / Mama | |
| The Trojan Women | Helen of Troy | |
| Witness | Patsy | |

=== Music videos ===
| Year | Song | Artist | Ref. |
|---|---|---|---|
| 2020 | "Black Dog" | Arlo Parks | |
