= Verdict (TV series) =

- Genre: Legal drama Anthology
- Written by: Catherine Hayes; Tom Needham; Susan Rogers; Chris Thompson
- Directed by: Michael Kerrigan; Mike Adams; Bill Pryde
- Starring: Susan Duerden
- Composer: Patrick Dineen
- Country of origin: United Kingdom
- Original language: English
- No. of series: 1
- No. of episodes: 4

Production
- Executive producer: Carolyn Reynolds
- Producer: David Hanson
- Editor: Janey Walklin
- Running time: 50 minutes
- Production company: Yorkshire Television

Original release
- Network: ITV
- Release: 31 July – 21 August 1998

Verdict is a British television legal anthology series, first broadcast on 31 July 1998, that ran for four episodes on ITV. The series, set entirely in the courtroom, features genuine members of the public as the jury, who give their verdict on each of the cases presented before them. Each episode features an entirely unique cast, with the exception of Susan Duerden, whose character, Heather Smart, appears in two of the four episodes. The series' format drew comparisons with fellow ITV counterpart Crown Court, which ran from 1972 until 1984.

The series was directed by Michael Kerrigan, Mike Adams and Bill Pryde; with Catherine Hayes, Tom Needham, Susan Rogers and Chris Thompson acting as principal writers. Aside from a single repeat run on ITV3 in the late 2000s, the series has never been re-broadcast or released on DVD.

== Cast ==
=== Split Second ===
- John Bowe as Richard Prestwick Q.C.
- Sarah Lancashire as Anne Cloves Q.C.
- John Bowler as PC Eddie Smith
- Richard Baglow as Tim Horton-Smith
- Richard Dillane as Robert Horton-Smith
- Stella Gonet as Alex Horton-Smith
- Hannah Nadry as Alice Horton-Smith
- Susan Duerden as Heather Smart
- Terrence Hardiman as James MacKenzie
- John Woodvine as Judge Peregrine Horner

=== Neighbours from Hell ===
- Keith Barron as Malcolm Davies Q.C.
- David Robb as Hugh Murray Q.C.
- Idris Elba as PC Brian Rawlinson
- June Brown as Amelia Sayers
- Michelle Collins as Camille Backhouse
- Alan Halsall as Joseph Backhouse
- Ian Curtis as James Loman
- Joe Jacobs as Adam Swift
- Marian McLoughlin as Jane McHugh
- Edward Hardwicke as Judge John Harrison

=== The Doctor's Opinion ===
- Ace Bhatti as Sanjay Mehta Q.C.
- Sue Johnston as Hazel De Vere Q.C.
- Katie Blake as Eden Barrow
- Ken Drury as Dr. Richard Bard
- John Duttine as Dr. Matthew Dixon
- Emily Hamilton as Sarah Dixon
- Emilia Fox as Charlie Moyes
- Georgia Goodman as Nicola Burns
- Mel Martin as Tina Paul
- Jason Merrells as Ben Clayton
- Ann Mitchell as Judge Jane Harrison

=== Be My Valentine ===
- Jonathan Barlow as Keith Durban
- Haydn Gwynne as Lynn Durban
- Tracie Bennett as Sally Taylor
- Peter Davison as Michael Naylor
- Susan Duerden as Heather Smart
- David Fleeshman as Bernard Michaelson
- Jan Francis as Kathryn Lewis
- Bernard Gallagher as Dr. Daniel Marsden
- Judy Holt as Rosemary Wyatt
- Barrie Rutter as Andrew McIntyre
- Martin Walsh as Terry Watson
- Wanda Ventham as Judge Beverley Conran

== Episodes ==
No.	Title	Directed by	Written by	Original release date
1	"Split Second"	Michael Kerrigan	Tom Needham	31 July 1998
A wife must justify shooting her husband twice: whether it was done in cold blood, and was it in defence of her child?
2	"Neighbours from Hell"	Michael Kerrigan	Catherine Hayes	7 August 1998
A well-behaved teenage boy who comes from a disruptive family is injured during a neighbourhood dispute.
3	"The Doctor's Opinion"	Bill Pryde	Susan Rogers	14 August 1998
Eighteen-year-old Sarah Dixon is charged with murdering her best friend by injecting him with heroin. The prosecution's chief witness is another friend, Charlotte Moyes, who has plenty to say for herself – most of it damning for Sarah.
4	"Be My Valentine"	Mike Adams	Chris Thompson	21 August 1998
Lynne Durban has started to rebuild her life after her husband leaves, helped by headmaster Michael Naylor, one of her ex-husband's friends who has grown fond of her. But Naylor wants a sexual relationship with her and, after they go out for a meal together, Lynne claims that he raped her.
