= List of EastEnders characters introduced in 2027 =

EastEnders is a BBC soap opera that first aired on 19 February 1985. This is a list of characters who are set to debut in 2027. The first character expected to debut in 2027 is Megan Hawkins, whose casting is still due to be announced.

== Megan Hawkins ==
Megan Hawkins is the daughter of Gemma Hawkins (Patricia Potter) and is set to arrive in Walford after Christmas 2026. Her arrival was announced on 20 August 2026, following her first mention when her mother and aunt, Jodie Hawkins (Anna Constable), came to Walford with her abusive boyfriend, Leo, tied up in the boot of their car. Megan's arrival will expand the recently introduced Hawkins family, who are the extended relatives of established character Nicola Mitchell (Laura Doddington). When the character was first announced, no casting details were available. However, on 24 August 2026, a casting notice was revealed, hinting that her character would be "confident, gorgeous, and ready to cause chaos". The notice attracted international media attention, with outlets such as Variety reporting on it. According to the casting notice, producers were searching for a 30-year-old female who could embody the character of an "Essex bombshell walking into the Love Island villa".

Speaking to the media press, executive producer Ben Wadey revealed: "Megan is out there, and we will meet her down the line. Not for a little bit, she's got her own storyline currently off screen, but in time, it'll very much be on screen." He further spoke that Megan's arrival would be part of the Hawkins' introduction, which was created to expand upon Nicola's backstory, a character that "fascinated" him.
