= Born to Run (TV series) =

- Genre: Drama
- Written by: Debbie Horsfield
- Directed by: Jean Stewart
- Starring: Keith Allen; John McArdle; Billie Whitelaw; Crissy Rock; Marian McLoughlin; Mike Eastman; Terence Rigby; William Ash; Rachel Davies; Kieran O'Brien; Mary Jo Randle
- Composer: Philip Appleby
- Country of origin: United Kingdom
- Original language: English
- No. of series: 1
- No. of episodes: 6

Production
- Executive producers: John Chapman; Michael Wearing
- Producer: Laura Mackie
- Production locations: Sefton, Merseyside, England, UK
- Running time: 50 minutes
- Production company: BBC

Original release
- Network: BBC1
- Release: 25 May – 29 June 1997

Born to Run is a BBC six-part marathon racing drama series written by Debbie Horsfield, and that aired on BBC1 from 25 May to 29 June 1997, starring Keith Allen, John McArdle and Billie Whitelaw.

== Cast and characters ==
- Keith Allen as Byron Flitch
- John McArdle as Eddie Gallagher
- Billie Whitelaw as Lillian "Lili" Flitch
- Crissy Rock as Edna
- Marian McLoughlin as Bron Flitch
- Terence Rigby as Burke Flitch
- Mike Eastman as Mechanic
- Rachel Davies as Elayne Quigley
- William Ash as Samuel "Sammy" Flitch
- Kieran O'Brien as Ryan Flitch
- Mary Jo Randle as Teresa
- Peter Kay as Delivery driver

== Episodes ==
No.	Title	Directed by	Written by	Original release date
1	"Episode 1"	Jean Stewart	Debbie Horsfield	25 May 1997
2	"Episode 2"	Jean Stewart	Debbie Horsfield	1 June 1997
3	"Episode 3"	Jean Stewart	Debbie Horsfield	8 June 1997
4	"Episode 4"	Jean Stewart	Debbie Horsfield	15 June 1997
5	"Episode 5"	Jean Stewart	Debbie Horsfield	22 June 1997
6	"Episode 6"	Jean Stewart	Debbie Horsfield	29 June 1997

== Media releases ==
The complete series of Born to Run on DVD in a 2-disc set was released by Simply Media on 7 September 2015.
