= Felix Uff =

English actor (born 1994)

- Born: Felix Andrew Michael Uff; 1994 (age 31–32); Ipswich, Suffolk, England
- Occupation: Actor
- Years active: 2022–present
- Television: EastEnders

Felix Andrew Michael Uff (born 1994) is a British actor. After training at the Royal Central School of Speech and Drama, he went on to appear in series including Outlander and Amadeus, before joining the cast of BBC soap opera EastEnders in 2026 as Ryder Hawkins.

== Life and career ==
Felix Andrew Michael Uff was born in 1994 in Ipswich, Suffolk, and trained at the Royal Central School of Speech and Drama. After graduating, he appeared in an episode of the American crime drama FBI: International and voiced Danny Mouser in a BBC Radio 4 drama, About A Dog. In 2023, he appeared in an episode of Outlander. In 2024, he appeared as Henry, Prince of Wales in Royal Autopsy. In 2025, Uff had roles in an episode of the Netflix series Too Much, as well as the film 100 Nights of Hero. He also appeared in an episode of Witches of Essex as Matthew Hopkins and as Jürgen in two episodes of Amadeus. In 2026, he appeared in the film The Hunting Party as Harold McBrayer, and as Aidan in the short film Layby.

In July 2026, it was announced that Uff would be joining the cast of the BBC soap opera EastEnders as Ryder Hawkins, a member of the newly introduced Hawkins family. On joining the show, Uff said: "EastEnders is a staple of British culture and it's a real privilege to join the cast. I can't wait for everyone to see the Hawkins family shaking things up!".

== Filmography ==
Year	Title	Role	Notes
2022	FBI: International	Marc Claes	Episode: "Get That Revolution Started"
2022	About a Dog	Danny Mouser	BBC Radio 4 drama
2023	Outlander	Captain Sir Francis Clerke	Episode: "A Practical Guide for Time-Travelers"
2024	Royal Autopsy	Henry, Prince of Wales	Episode: "Henry IV: The Usurper"
2025	Too Much	Harold (at Jonno's)	Episode: "Notting Kill"
2025	100 Nights of Hero	Clarence	Film role
2025	Witches of Essex	Matthew Hopkins	Episode: "Manningtree (1645)"
2025	Amadeus	Jürgen	2 episodes
2026	The Hunting Party	Harold McBrayer	Film role
2026	Layby	Aidan	Short film
2026–present	EastEnders	Ryder Hawkins	Regular role

== Awards and nominations ==
Year	Award	Category	Work	Result	Ref.
2027	TV Choice Awards	Best Soap Newcomer	EastEnders	Pending	
