= A profoundly affectionate, passionate devotion to someone (-noun) =

2017 play by debbie tucker green

a profoundly affectionate, passionate devotion to someone (-noun) is a play by British playwright debbie tucker green that premiered at the Royal Court Theatre in 2017. It received mixed reviews from critics.

== Synopsis ==
Three couples argue and discuss their marriages. In Part One, the first couple has a series of arguments, accusing each other of being increasingly inattentive and incompetent at managing the relationship on their end. In Part Two, the second couple accuses each other of deliberately undermining the other, with each attempting to maintain power in the relationship. In Part Three, the third couple (consisting of the daughter of the first couple and the man from the second couple) have more civil conversation about their relationship.

== Productions ==
The play premiered at the Royal Court Theatre on February 28, 2017. It ran in a limited engagement until April 1, 2017. The production was directed by debbie tucker green and featured Gary Beadle, Lashana Lynch, and Meera Syal among the cast. The set, designed by Merle Hansel, was plain. The actors stood on a narrow ledge around the room's perimeter. The audience sat on stools, requiring them to rotate in their seats to watch the play in its entirety. This layout was designed to increase the audience's emotional investment in the play as the cast was often situated on opposite sides of the room, requiring audience members to pick a single side of the argument to follow. The walls of the set were chalkboards that the actors drew on throughout the play.

== Response ==
Upon its debut, the play received mixed reviews from critics, who viewed it as difficult to follow. Michael Billington, writing for The Guardian, gave the play two out of five stars. He praised the interactions between the characters but criticized the play for a lack of plot and its "perverse" set design. The Financial Times was more positive, writing that the stool setting "emphasizes the adversarial nature of much of the dialogue" but criticizing the play's language for being oblique. Similarly, a review in Exeunt Magazine praised the dialogue for "falling somewhere between rap and poetry" but noted that there was little for the audience to emotionally connect to. FringeReview was more positive, praising the cast's chemistry and the play's structure. Korbinian Stöckl, in his 2021 book Love in Contemporary British Drama, noted that the play's lack of a coherent plot allowed green to explore more themes than it otherwise could have. Stöckl wrote that the repetition of arguments across the three parts helped emphasize the green's view of love as precarious.
