= Denise Fox =

- EastEnders character
- Portrayed by: Diane Parish
- Duration: 2006–present
- First appearance: Episode 3150; 11 May 2006
- Introduced by: Kate Harwood
- Spin-off appearances: EastEnders: E20 (2010); The B&B (2012); The Ghosts of Ian Beale (2014); The Queen Vic Quiz Night (2020); TV Soundtracks EastEnders: The Six (2023)
- Crossover appearances: East Street (2010)
In-universe information
- Other names: Denise Johnson; Denise Wicks
- Occupation: Post office assistant; Taxi driver; Shopkeeper; B&B worker; Businesswoman; Receptionist; Hairdresser; Salon owner
- Family: Branning
- Mother: Emerald Fox
- Half-brothers: Darnell Larson Jr
- Half-sisters: Kim Fox; Daphne Fox
- Husband: Owen Turner (backstory); Kevin Wicks (2007); Lucas Johnson (2009–2011)
- Civil partner: Jack Branning (2021–2024)
- Sons: Raymond Fox
- Daughters: Chelsea Fox; Libby Fox
- Stepsons: Jordan Johnson; Ricky Branning; Dean Wicks (adoptive)
- Stepdaughters: Amy Mitchell; Penny Branning; Carly Wicks (adoptive)
- Grandsons: Jordan Fox
- Nephews: Mica Fox
- Nieces: Pearl Fox; Grace Larson

Denise Fox (also Wicks and Johnson) is a fictional character from the BBC soap opera EastEnders, played by Diane Parish. She made her first appearance on 11 May 2006 and temporarily left EastEnders in early 2008 to give birth to her second child. Her leave-taking had coincided with the departures of Deano Wicks (Matt Di Angelo), Kevin Wicks (Phil Daniels) and Carly Wicks (Kellie Shirley). She returned to Walford on 6 June 2008. This is Parish's second role in EastEnders, as she previously played singer Lola Christie in 1998.

Introduced as a single mother to Chelsea (Tiana Benjamin) and Libby Fox (Belinda Owusu), the latter of whom was conceived from a vituperative marriage, Denise has gone on to marry three additional times. Firstly, to Kevin in 2007, who dies months later, to Lucas Johnson (Don Gilet) in 2009, with them divorcing two years later after he is imprisoned for murdering their ex-spouses respectively, and then to Jack Branning (Scott Maslen) in 2021. She also embarks on a loveless engagement to Ian Beale (Adam Woodyatt), flings with younger men Fatboy (Ricky Norwood), Kush Kazemi (Davood Ghadami) and Ravi Gulati (Aaron Thiara) and a drunken one-night stand with Phil Mitchell (Steve McFadden) which results in a late in life pregnancy and the birth of a son, Raymond Dawkins. Other storylines involving Denise include surviving a bus crash, losing her job, descending into poverty, igniting a feud with Phil's sister and Jack's ex-partner, Sam Mitchell (Kim Medcalf), struggling with family issues such as her stepdaughter Amy Mitchell's (Ellie Dadd) self-harming and her stepson Ricky Mitchell (Frankie Day) becoming a father at twelve-years-old, assaulting Nish Panesar (Navin Chowdhry) with a champagne bottle and covering up the murder of Keanu Taylor (Danny Walters) during "The Six" storyline, being sectioned after developing psychosis due to Keanu's murder and separating, later divorcing with Jack after discovering his affair with Stacey Slater (Lacey Turner), a brief relationship with Ravi again, reuniting with Jack in a "viewer voted storyline", and being diagnosed with acute myeloid leukaemia, a form of blood cancer.

== Creation and development ==
=== Casting and introduction ===
On 7 November 2005, the BBC announced that Diane Parish had been cast in EastEnders as a "sassy, strong" character with links to the established Wicks family, who would be "a force to be reckoned with." Parish had previously appeared in the serial as singer Lola Christie in 1998. In January 2006, Parish's character was revealed to be Denise Fox, who would embark on a romance with fellow newcomer Kevin Wicks (Phil Daniels). Tiana Benjamin was cast as Denise's daughter Chelsea, and spoke of her admiration for Parish, eagerly anticipating the opportunity to work with her. Lara Gould of the Sunday Mirror described the new characters as the "feisty Fox family", revealing that Denise would have a second, younger daughter, Elizabeth ["Libby"], played by Belinda Owusu. Gould reported that the family would "arrive in Albert Square with a bang and [...] cause friction from the off", expanding: "The Fox girls don't take any nonsense – they'll be a force to be reckoned with." Lee Ross was later cast as Denise's former husband and Libby's father Owen Turner. Kris Green of media and entertainment website Digital Spy described Owen as having had "a disappointing life", revealing that Denise had separated from him as a result of his heavy drinking.

=== Storyline development ===
Denise went on to marry Kevin, acting as stepmother to his children Carly (Kellie Shirley) and Deano Wicks (Matt Di Angelo). Parish briefly departed from the show to take maternity leave, and when Daniels declined to renew his contract, he, Shirley and Di Angelo were written out permanently, coinciding with Parish's temporary exit. In Denise's absence, Chelsea reunited with her estranged father Lucas Johnson, with Don Gilet cast in the role. Upon Parish's return, Denise and Lucas ultimately reunited, with Gilet commenting: "He's found a woman who's strong-willed, strong-minded, a good mother to their shared child and to Libby and [Lucas' son] Jordan (Michael-Joel David Stuart). It's kind of ideal and he's worked so hard for it. Nothing, but nothing, should stop that – he deserves to have this. It's one of these situations where he likes the idea that he's earned this relationship. That seems to be more of a priority than the pure love he has for her. He loves what he's earned and he's now this respectable person who wants to hold on to what he has by any means necessary."

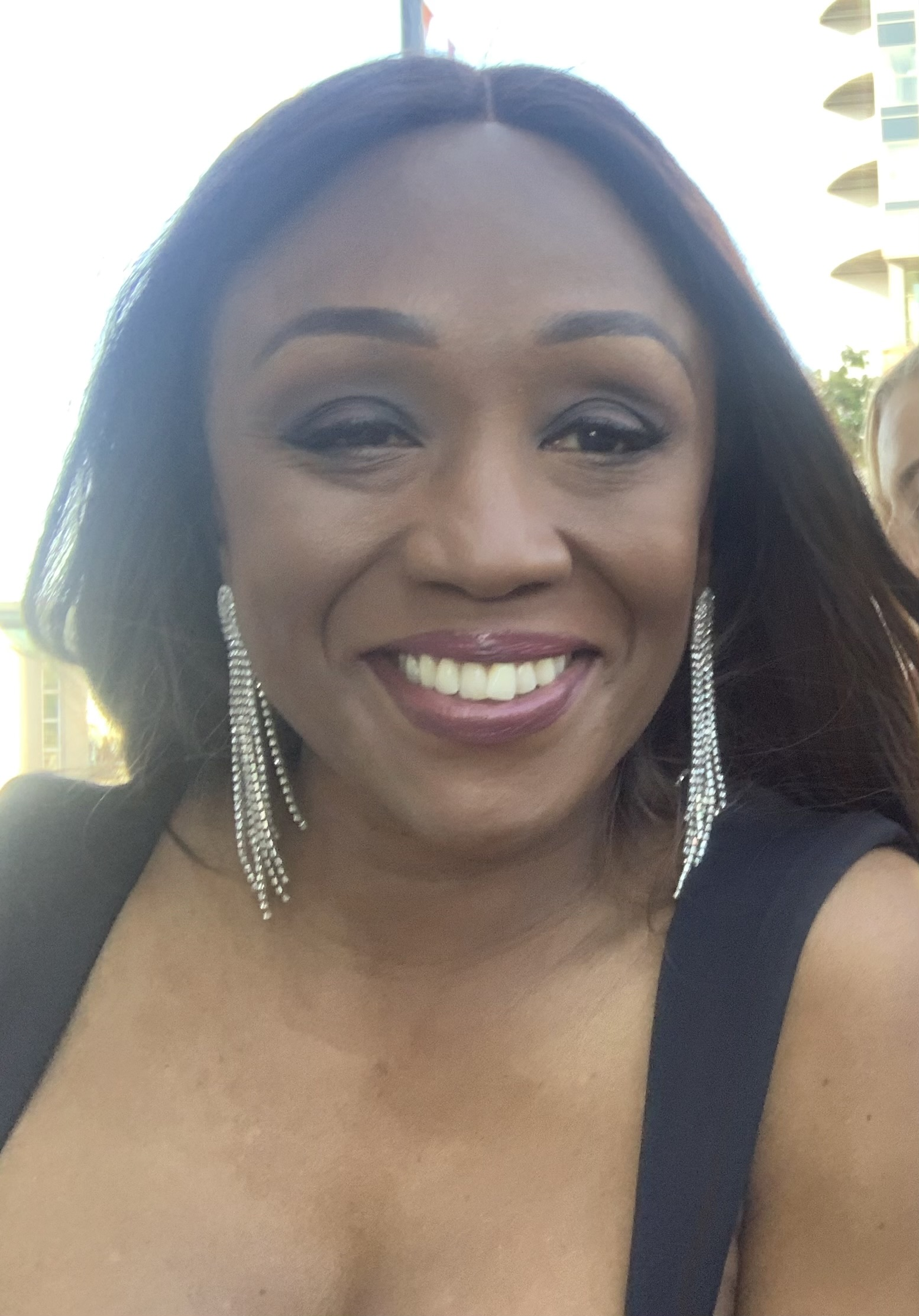
Diane Parish found it difficult to keep her character's faked death a secret.

When Lucas' former wife Trina (Sharon Duncan Brewster) began interfering in their relationship, Lucas was instrumental in her death, and went on to kill Owen when he came close to discovering the truth. In May 2010, Green reported that in an upcoming episode, Lucas would be seen to strangle Denise and dispose of her body in a canal. He questioned whether Parish was to be written out of the soap, following the announcements that both Benjamin and Owusu would be leaving EastEnders later in 2010. Discussing the storyline, Gilet refused to reveal whether Lucas would kill Denise, but indicated that events may not be as they seemed. Parish commented: "It looks really bad as he gets Denise in a headlock and chokes her. If she survives, it'll be a miracle." Following the episode where Denise appeared to be strangled by Lucas, entertainment journalist Sharon Marshall appeared on This Morning, saying there would be "twists and turns" but would not confirm whether Denise was dead or alive. It ultimately transpired that Lucas had faked Denise's death to hold her hostage in a basement. Parish found it difficult to keep details of the storyline a secret, and struggled to lie when questioned by members of the public.

Questioned about the future for Denise following the departure of her daughters, Parish responded: "She is lost without her babies, but then her sister Kim comes along and she's a brilliant distraction. As for men, I think Denise should give them up and get a cat, but I'm sure she'll end up in another destructive relationship." She told Daniel Kilkelly of entertainment website Digital Spy: "I don't think she'll be looking for a new man any time soon. I think she's just going to take it easy on the man front. I think what needs to happen with the family is that everybody just needs to find their own way to find their own peace. I think that's the future really for all of them."

In October 2012, it was confirmed that a new storyline would see Denise and Fatboy (Ricky Norwood) spend the night together after he rescues her when she gets unwanted attention from a man. Norwood told Inside Soap, "I don't think Fatboy is looking for love—but he's happy to be swept off his feet by Denise, who's this hot older woman he never imagined he could be with. Denise is a scorching woman—she's got a dynamite body and a beautiful smile. She's way out of his league, but there is a lot of chemistry between them. I think they'd make a really good couple. That would be cool. Fatboy may be young, but he's got an old soul and he's not just some young boy messing about. There is potential there if Denise could see it, but because of the age thing, I think she might worry that people were saying things about her. Right now, she's just enjoying herself." Norwood added that while the pair's relationship was sexual, a serious future for them could be possible.

In February 2013, it was reported that Denise would enter a relationship with EastEnders long-running character Ian Beale, portrayed by Adam Woodyatt. On the match, Parish said that Denise had "always had a soft spot for Ian", but also commented that "whether they go the distance in the next few months remains to be seen."

== Storylines ==
Moving to Walford, Denise has a tempestuous encounter with Kevin Wicks (Phil Daniels); however, an attraction develops and they begin dating. Denise's ex-spouse Owen Turner (Lee Ross), an abusive alcoholic, soon turns up and wishes to reunite with their daughter, Libby Fox (Belinda Owusu). When Denise prevents this from happening, Owen kidnaps Libby and tries to drown them both – but she recovers and Owen is arrested. Denise, who never knew her father but knows he played in a band called "The Five Hectors", thinks that her lodger Patrick Trueman (Rudolph Walker) may be her father as he was in the band but a DNA test proves that he is not. The band also consisted of Aubrey Valentine (Joseph Marcell), Cedric Lucas (Ram John Holder), Dwight and Earl. The identity of Denise's father is never discovered, up to the point where Aubrey also dismisses himself; nonetheless, Patrick quickly bonds with Denise and becomes a father figure towards her.

When Kevin's former wife, Shirley Carter (Linda Henry), arrives in Walford, she causes problems for both Denise and Kevin. Shirley reveals Kevin's secret, that he is not Deano (Matt Di Angelo) and Carly Wicks's (Kellie Shirley) biological father. After Shirley tells everyone this, Kevin flees. Upset, Denise threatens to move away but stays when Kevin returns and proposes marriage. Shirley unsuccessfully tries to ruin the wedding and Denise deals with various problems, including Chelsea and Dean's imprisonment for framing Sean Slater (Robert Kazinsky), Kevin's attempts to conceal the crime, and a feud with her boss at the post office, Zainab Masood (Nina Wadia). Kevin starts selling cars for Phil Mitchell (Steve McFadden), but discovers they are cut-and-shuts; he tries to destroy the cars but dies in an accident. Denise and Carly leave Walford after the funeral, seeking the right place to scatter Kevin's ashes.

Denise returns and is angry to discover her eldest daughter, Chelsea Fox (Tiana Benjamin), is using drugs and in contact with her father Lucas Johnson (Don Gilet). Denise is initially hostile due to Lucas formerly being a drug addict, but she warms to him when she sees he has changed and they eventually reunite. Denise proposes to Lucas but he is still married to Trina (Sharon Duncan-Brewster). Trina attempts to seduce Lucas but he accidentally kills her. Denise helps Lucas' son Jordan come to terms with his mother's death, with them believing it to be an overdose. With Trina dead, Denise and Lucas are able to marry, though further complications arise when Owen is released from prison. He desperately tries to show Denise that she cannot trust Lucas but they marry regardless. Lucas kills Owen on their wedding day and his body is discovered eight months later. Lucas confesses to Denise, claiming self-defense. At first, she agrees to protect him but convinces him to go to the police. However, he instead drives her to a canal. When she refuses to submit to God, he chokes and kidnaps her. He murders a prostitute, Gemma (Rita Balogun), and identifies her as Denise, her family believing she committed suicide. Lucas keeps Denise prisoner in the house next door but she escapes after a few weeks and Lucas is arrested, later sentenced to life imprisonment. Chelsea, needing a fresh start, moves to Spain with Owen's mother, Liz Turner (Kate Williams) and Libby joins them for a holiday before returning to university. Denise is heartbroken to see her girls leave but is distracted by her sister, Kim Fox (Tameka Empson), arriving and saying that she has left her boyfriend, Dexter Mulholland (Robbie Gee), and asks to move in with them.

Kim and Denise later buy the house next door and open a bed and breakfast. Denise talks to Zainab, who helps her move on by destroying memories of Lucas. Denise starts dating Yusef Khan (Ace Bhatti), Zainab's former husband, but ends it after realising he is still in love with Zainab. On Christmas Day 2011, Denise opens a present containing a broken toy car and a USB stick with a recording of Phil talking about his part in Kevin's death. Horrified, Denise calls Phil a murderer and tries to get him arrested but fails to do so.

Yusef starts a fire at the bed and breakfast, damaging it so badly that Denise, Kim and Patrick are forced to move out. The insurance company refuse to pay out as it was arson so Patrick gives Denise and Kim the Minute Mart but Zainab gives them Yusef's money so they can rebuild the bed and breakfast. When the B&B opens, Denise is angry that Kim simply flirts with the customers, leaving all the work to her. They have an argument and Denise quits but returns on the condition that Kim puts in more effort. When Zainab's brother-in-law. AJ Ahmed (Phaldut Sharma), arrives in Walford, he attempts to con Denise but fails. The two later have drinks but AJ leaves. Denise attends Christian Clarke's (John Partridge) stag party where a man gives her unwanted attention. She has sex with Fatboy (Ricky Norwood) when he defends her from an overly-persistent interest and allows him to walk her home. The next day, Denise is embarrassed and tells Fatboy it was a mistake. However, it is revealed she has feelings for Fatboy and after she welcomes him into her home, they have sex again. Denise agrees to pursue a secret relationship with Fatboy. When Fatboy tries to encourage her to make their relationship public, Denise calls it off, telling Fatboy she will treasure the memory of their time together. After a lonely Christmas, Kim and Zainab decide to set up a date for her. However, this fails and when Kim's boyfriend Ray Dixon (Charles Venn) comforts her, they share a kiss. Ray tells Kim about it but says Denise made the first move, so Kim slaps Denise and says she is dead to her. Denise and Kim reconcile until Ray ends his relationship with Kim. Kim blames Denise so Denise stays with Ian Beale (Adam Woodyatt). When Ray tells Kim the truth, Denise and Kim reconcile and Denise moves back in with Kim.

Denise and Ian get locked in the Minute Mart's storage cupboard and share a kiss, which leads to a relationship. This becomes public due to Ian's daughter, Lucy Beale (Hetti Bywater). Denise helps Ian open a restaurant and supports him when Carl White (Daniel Coonan) threatens and blackmails him. Denise moves in with Ian and his children and they are joined by Cindy Williams (Mimi Keene), daughter of Ian's former wife. Denise begins to feel part of the family and supports Ian when he intends to testify that he saw Max Branning (Jake Wood) tampering with the brakes of Carl's car. However, Ian fails to do this and Denise is devastated to learn that Ian was intending to lie to frame Max on Carl's orders. The return of Ian's former wife, Jane Beale (Laurie Brett), causes Denise to have doubts about their relationship. She accepts Ian's marriage proposal and during their engagement party, she shares a kiss with Fatboy. They come to their senses when they are caught by Cora Cross (Ann Mitchell). Fatboy's girlfriend, Poppy Meadow (Rachel Bright), learns of the kiss and posts a letter to Ian before leaving Walford but Lucy reads it and challenges Denise. For the sake of her father's mental health, Lucy agrees to keep it a secret. Denise and Ian drift apart due to his busy lifestyle. After visiting Libby in Oxford, she plans to leave Ian. However, when Lucy is murdered (see "Who Killed Lucy Beale?"), Denise feels forced to stay and support him. Denise is sidelined by Ian and decides to leave, confiding in Patrick that she feels trapped. Worried that she will look like a bad person, Denise changes her mind and returns but still feels ostracised. She does not attend Lucy's funeral after seeing Ian and Jane comforting one another. Denise tells Ian she can no longer be with him but he begs her to stay. Denise agrees to stay when Ian admits he has taken her for granted and encourages her to go with Libby to Spain to celebrate Chelsea's birthday.

On Denise's return, things are much better between her and Ian and he arranges for them to visit Libby in Oxford. As she is about to leave, Patrick tries to stop her, but fails and leaves a message, asking her to call him as soon as possible. However, she learns that Patrick has had a stroke and they return to Walford. When he leaves hospital, he stays with Ian and Denise. Denise learns that Ian had sex with prostitute Rainie Cross (Tanya Franks) on the night Lucy died. Feeling betrayed, Denise locks herself in the Minute Mart. She tells Ian that she forgives him but leaves him the next day, taking Patrick back to live in his own house and declaring that Ian is not the man she loved. Going into Patrick's house, Denise is devastated to find that the house has been broken into. Denise struggles to care for Patrick alone, despite support from Shabnam Masood (Rakhee Thakrar). She finds that Denise has been stealing alcohol from the shop but does not report it if Denise returns the value. Patrick is devastated to learn that he may lose his allotment so Denise goes there, intending to maintain it, only to dig up Lucy's phone and purse. Although hesitant, she returns them to the Beales. A pregnant Kim surprises Denise and accuses Ian of ruining Denise's life. Kim finds bruises on Patrick's arms and realises Denise had beaten him and confronts her. Denise later tells Kim she cannot be Patrick's carer anymore. After an argument with Denise in The Queen Victoria public house, Kim goes into labour and gives birth to a daughter named Pearl. Although she disowns Denise, they soon reconcile. Kim's husband Vincent Hubbard (Richard Blackwood) tracks her down in Walford, but Denise and Patrick become wary of his intentions.

Denise is visited by the police, saying someone in their custody has given her address as theirs. Eventually she realises that it is Jordan (now played by Joivan Wade). She discovers that Jordan stole from Chelsea and Libby advises Denise to stay away from him. Denise visits Lucas in prison and he tells her that he thinks about her, asking her to find Jordan. Despite her family begging her not to, Denise sends Jordan a message online. He does not reply but visits and tells her to leave him alone. However, when Kim hits Jordan, he allows Denise to clean the wound. Jordan is received badly by the rest of the family but Denise defends him after he pushes her in frustration, he leaves when Patrick says he is just like Lucas. The police visit Denise and tell her that Jordan was attacked by a gang but discharged himself from hospital. She tracks him down and learns that Jordan's girlfriend died from a drug overdose. Denise brings Jordan and his son, JJ Johnson (Zayden Kareem), home and although Patrick comes around to the idea, Kim believes it will bring Lucas back into Denise's life. Denise visits Lucas again and he wants Jordan to visit too. He does and Denise agrees to help Lucas get a job in the prison kitchens, but Lucas asks Jordan to help him in his plan for him to escape from prison. When Jordan tells Denise, she refuses to help and alerts Libby to call the police – after which Jordan reveals to them the truth about Lucas' plan before he is arrested. Denise vows to look after JJ until Jordan is released, but Patrick secretly calls social services. Denise is told by social worker Hilary Taylor (Sadie Shimmin) that JJ's mother, Amelle, is alive. Amelle visits Denise and JJ, but he refuses to come out from under the table. Denise learns JJ is called Jamie and she talks to him, he says Jordan told him that Amelle left because she found him "hard work" and he is only hiding because he is scared of putting Amelle off him. Denise persuades him to see his mother, and when Hilary talks about increased contact, Denise decides JJ should live with Amelle. Denise finds out Libby is pregnant and attempts to stop a termination but fails; distressed, Denise turns to drink and has a one-night stand with an equally drunk Phil, but Phil has no memory of this.

Denise befriends Carmel Kazemi (Bonnie Langford) and has a brief fling with her son, Kush Kazemi (Davood Ghadami). Denise ends it as she does not want to ruin her friendship with Carmel. When Denise faints, she researches her symptoms and initially fears that she has cancer but discovers that she is pregnant. Kush learns about Denise's pregnancy and believing he is the father, goes with Denise to her appointment. Denise learns she is 18 to 19 weeks pregnant, meaning Phil is the father. Denise tells her family but refuses to name the father. Denise tells Carmel that she has decided to have the baby and put it up for adoption. Kim finds out about Denise's plans and tries to talk her out of it whilst Patrick agrees to support her. Kim tells Denise that she and Vincent will adopt her baby, but Denise declines their offer. Shirley suspects that her former boyfriend, Buster Briggs (Karl Howman), is the father but Denise admits that Phil is the father. Unbeknownst to Denise and Shirley, Phil's wife, Sharon Mitchell (Letitia Dean), overhears this. Denise is later taken to hospital to be induced. Kim and their mother, Emerald Fox (Doña Croll), also go to the hospital. Kim and Emerald are angry when they learn that Denise is putting her son up for adoption but Denise refuses to change her mind and says an emotional farewell to her son alone. Sharon tells Phil the truth and he demands to see his son but then agrees to the adoption. Libby, Emerald and Carmel come to accept Denise's decision but Kim remains against it. Denise is injured in a bus crash her. Denise admits to Mick Carter (Danny Dyer) that Kim was right and that she should never have given up her son for adoption, though he reassures her that it is the best decision she has made for him. Denise soon realises that Kim still sees her as a mother figure since Emerald abandoned them as children and thinks that if Denise can give up her son, then she can abandon Kim, so Denise tells to consider herself abandoned. Denise goes to Emerald's farewell party where Emerald criticises Kim's parenting; Denise stands up for Kim and Kim admits that she is thankful for her sister, to which Emerald replies that they are not sisters and that Denise was brought to her as a baby. Emerald leaves and Kim and Denise reconcile. Denise confronts schoolboy Keegan Baker (Zack Morris) after he vandalises the garden and after continuously insulting Denise, she hits him in the face. Keegan reports Denise to the police and she is fined £250.

Denise learns that her son's potential adoptive parents have named him Raymond and she signs the adoption forms. While she is adamant that she will not change her mind, she continues to struggle with her decision and angrily tears up a newly arrived letter from Raymond's adoptive parents without reading it. Kim then wrongly believes that Ian is Raymond's biological father and confronts him, causing Denise to break down and admit to her that Phil is the father. Denise finds the letter from Raymond's parents in the recycling bin, informing her that he is happy with them, which comforts and reassures her. Denise and Kush start a relationship, but when Denise talks to a reporter, criticising the community and the Minute Mart, she quits her job after they decide to send her on a course. Denise struggles financially and is unable to buy food, taking food from bins. She ends her relationship with Kush because she does not want to admit her problems. Carmel later confronts her over this, but Denise slaps her when she makes a remark about Raymond. Denise eventually claims for Universal Credit, but is stunned that she will not receive money for ten weeks as she left her job voluntarily, but is given a referral to a food bank. Denise leaves the food bank when she sees Cora, who works there. Cora persuades Denise to get some food, but Denise gives her food to a young mother, Candice (Maia Watkins), who has no voucher. On the day of her final exam, Denise faints, but she is delighted later in the year when she passes her GCSE exam with the highest grade possible. Kush and Denise stat dating again, but when Kush asks Denise to move in with him, she declines, feeling that things are moving too fast for them. When Kush suffers a heart attack shortly afterwards, Denise regrets rejecting him and spontaneously proposes to him in the hospital, which he accepts. Denise discovers that Kim is pregnant and supports her when she has a miscarriage. Kim and Denise take a DNA test and discover they are sisters after all.

Denise and Kush's relationship continues and she supports him through the death of his brother Shakil Kazemi (Shaheen Jafargholi). They become engaged, however Denise is unaware that Kush has had a one-night stand with a waitress, Talia. After growing apart, Denise decides to end their relationship. Denise and Kim set up a beauty salon, Fox & Hair, and they employ Lola Pearce (Danielle Harold) and Mitch Baker (Roger Griffiths). Denise and Kim clash over their vision for the business and Kim begins a feud with employee Chantelle Atkins (Jessica Plummer), who Denise grows close to. Soon after, she starts dating Jack Branning (Scott Maslen). Denise is attacked by Hunter Owen (Charlie Winter) after he escapes from prison. When Patrick returns with his new wife Sheree Trueman (Suzette Llewellyn), Denise grows suspicious of her. She suspects that Sheree is having an affair and confronts her, leading to her departure. Denise later learns that Sheree had been contacting her son Isaac Baptiste (Stevie Basula). Denise learns that Raymond has been involved in a car accident, which has killed his adoptive parents Jonah and Lydia. She is reunited with Raymond and meets his adoptive grandmother Ellie Nixon (Mica Paris). Denise continues to visit Raymond in hospital, disguising herself as a friend of his adoptive mother Lydia. She keeps this a secret from Jack and Phil, but they both find out and Phil also starts visiting Raymond, despite Denise's attempts to stop him. Ellie discovers the truth and forbids them from seeing Raymond. Phil discovers that Ellie is a gangster and he persuades Denise into seeking custody of Raymond, but she only agrees to do so on the condition that Phil has no involvement in his life. This strains her relationship with Jack and they separate. After Phil blackmails Ellie, she relinquishes custody of Raymond and he moves in with Denise. Denise initially struggles to bond with Raymond but is supported by Jack. She decides to take Raymond to church on Christmas Day 2020 and sees Chelsea (now Zaraah Abrahams), and Lucas, who has recently been released from prison. Denise is upset that Chelsea has been secretly contacting Lucas and remains fearful of him. When she learns that Chelsea is taking Lucas on holiday, she is devastated, and later goes to confront him when he upsets Chelsea by refusing to follow her. He lashes out at Denise and they disappear, and it is assumed that Lucas has hurt her when they discover blood in his flat. It is later revealed that Chelsea's ex-fiancé Caleb Malone (Ben Freeman) has kidnapped Denise, and Chelsea later reveals that she owes Caleb money and is using Lucas to smuggle drugs for him. Denise reluctantly agrees to help Chelsea plant drugs on Lucas, believing that he owes Chelsea. Lucas discovers the truth and agrees to help, although he is later caught and sent back to prison. Denise and Jack become engaged.

Kim reignites her search for Vincent, causing Phil to persuade Denise to stop Kim, fearing that his rival Aidan Maguire (Patrick Bergin) might return to Walford to harm Kim and Raymond. Phil agrees to repurchase Fox & Hair for Denise and Kim in exchange for her silence. Denise struggles to conceal Vincent's death from Kim and secretly funds Pearl's private school tuition. When Kim learns the truth, she disowns Denise and decides to move to Scotland. Denise helps Kim report Vincent's disappearance and Phil's involvement to the police. On Christmas Day 2021, Denise marries Jack. Phil discovers that the Foxes have reported him to the police and decides to flee with Raymond. Phil is later arrested, and Raymond is returned to her. Denise supports Chelsea when it's revealed that her husband, Gray Atkins (Toby-Alexander Smith) had murdered Chantelle, Kush and Tina. Denise is devastated when Chelsea decides to place her son Jordan Atkins for adoption but manages to convince her to keep him. Denise clashes with Phil's sister and Jack's former fling, Sam Mitchell (Kim Medcalf), who returns and threatens to take her and Jack's son Ricky (Frankie Day) to Spain unless Jack helps her deal with her adversary, Jonah Tyler (Mark Mooney). Jack reluctantly allows Sam to move in with him and Denise when she has nowhere else to go. However, Sam continually aggravates Denise and conspires with Phil to blackmail Denise into giving £50,000 to buy Ruby Allen's (Louisa Lytton) nightclub. Sam threatens to reveal that Denise knows the truth about Vincent's death if she doesn't return the money Phil provided for the Fox & Hair salon. Denise reluctantly agrees but later throws Sam out. Sam continues to create problems for Jack and Denise, leading to Denise's outrage upon discovering a video of Sam kissing Jack.

In early 2023, Denise faces her stepdaughter Amy Mitchell's (Ellie Dadd) self-harming and Ricky impregnating Lily Slater (Lillia Turner). Denise strives to support the children and serves as Jack's voice of reason as the pressures of family life cause him to become increasingly stressed and angry. Seeking solace, Denise is drawn to Ravi Gulati (Aaron Thiara), who is attracted to her. Despite her initial enjoyment of his attention and a brief kiss, Denise regrets the moment and is tempted to cheat on Jack but chooses to stay loyal. Ravi, attempting to make Denise jealous, starts flirting with Chelsea. On Valentine's Day, Denise feels hurt when Jack only spends time with her due to Amy's insistence. Overwhelmed by temptation, Denise meets Ravi at a hotel but cannot go through with it and leaves. Ravi continues to harass Denise, refusing to leave her alone. Callum Highway (Tony Clay) discovers video footage of Denise and Ravi together and warns her to end the affair. Denise learns that Jack and Callum are collaborating to take down Ravi and informs Ravi, hoping he will stop his harassment. Ravi threatens to expose their affair unless Denise provides him with files from Jack's investigation. Denise rejects his threats, telling Ravi that he means nothing to her. Ravi resumes flirting with Chelsea; Denise tries to warn Ravi away, but he retaliates by threatening to continue playing with Chelsea's feelings unless Denise hands over the evidence Jack has against him.

Denise gives Kim her phone for an event, but Ravi unknowingly sends text messages to it. Kim reads these messages while driving with Denzel Danes (Jaden Ladega), resulting in a crash into the Argee Bhargee. Denise confides in Kim, who agrees to keep quiet. However, Ravi's son, Davinder "Nugget" Gulati (Juhaim Rasul Choudhury), overhears Denise and Ravi discussing their affair and informs Denzel, who then tells Amy. Amy begins drinking heavily, skipping school, and confronts Denise about her affair with Ravi. Denise admits her infidelity to Jack, who throws her out. Despite their issues, Denise and Jack decide to reconcile for the sake of their children, although Jack struggles to forgive Denise for her affair. Denise becomes enraged when Chelsea and Ravi resume their relationship. Denise steals Ravi's laptop and discovers footage of Ravi murdering his adoptive father, Ranveer (Anil Goutam), not his stepmother Suki Panesar (Balvinder Sopal), whom Ravi had misled into believing she was responsible. After confronting Ravi, he destroys the laptop. Denise reveals the truth to Chelsea and the Panesars, and teams up with Suki to take down Ravi and clear her son Kheerat's (Jaz Deol) name. Ravi retaliates by having Kheerat attacked in prison and Suki is threatened into silence by Ravi and her husband Nish (Navin Chowdhry), thwarting their efforts.

When Denise returns after visiting Emerald in Montserrat, she and Jack struggles once again. Jack has a one-night stand with Lily's mother Stacey Slater (Lacey Turner). He hides this from Denise, but she discovers Stacey's necklace and is told by Jack that it belongs to a random woman he had slept with. Denise soon finds out the woman is Stacey and, feeling betrayed, decides to end their marriage. Amy nearly resumes self-harming upon learning about Denise's plans to leave, and Jack uses this to coerce Denise into staying. On Christmas Day 2023, Denise joins Sharon, Linda, and Kathy Cotton (Gillian Taylforth) at The Queen Vic after Sharon jilts her fiancé, Keanu Taylor (Danny Walters). They are joined by Suki and Stacey, who are fleeing from Nish. Nish arrives and assaults Suki. Denise strikes Nish with a champagne bottle, and he is presumed dead. Linda calls for an ambulance but hangs up to avoid implicating Denise. When paramedics arrive, Denise impersonates Linda and lies about the accidental call. Nish is later revived by Suki but remains unconscious. Keanu then arrives at The Vic and strangles her and Linda intervenes by stabbing Keanu with a meat thermometer, killing him instantly. Denise, Sharon, Kathy, Stacey, Suki, and Linda decide to frame Keanu for Nish's attack and bury him under the floorboards of the Bridge Street Café. They lie to the police and the paramedics, claiming that Keanu attacked Nish in a fight and then fled Walford. In the aftermath of Keanu's death, Denise struggles and, during an argument with Linda and Stacey about the cover up, falls onto Keanu's corpse under the café's floorboards and loses her necklace. Denise begins to experience a mental breakdown, which strains her marriage and drives Jack into an affair with Stacey. Denise, who is hallucinating Keanu, shows signs of early psychosis. Stacey tries to help but is unsuccessful. Denise visits Lucas in prison and confesses to helping bury Keanu's body, but he dismisses her claims. Convinced that Linda's son Johnny Carter (Charlie Suff) is plotting to frame her, Denise decides to leave Walford. Amy accompanies her but is abandoned when Denise wanders off into the woods. Jack finds Denise and brings her back home, where she is involuntarily committed.

Following her release, Denise and Jack reconcile, but his affair with Stacey is exposed by Martin Fowler (James Bye). Upset, Denise leaves with Chelsea. Upon returning home, after discussing things with Amy and Ricky, Denise informs Jack that she wants a divorce. As the concrete in the café begins to crack, the group becomes anxious that Keanu's body may be discovered. Stacey helps Denise retrieve her D necklace, and while they are digging up the concrete, Jack walks in. Denise is forced to confess that Keanu's body is buried under the floor and that she and Stacey were involved in covering up his murder. Jack offers to assist Denise, but she refuses to reconcile. Denise later supports Jack after Amy is injured in a stampede at Peggy's. They grow close again and decide to reunite. Denise discovers that Chelsea was responsible for the accident, and not her stepdaughter Penny (Kitty Castledine). However, when Denise sees Jack and Stacey together, Denise reveals that she cannot forget about their affair and breaks up with Jack.

Nish discovers the truth about Keanu's murder and confesses to the crime in order to protect Suki. Denise feels guilty when she discovers Nish's granddaughter Avani Nandra-Hart (Aaliyah James) is being cyberbullied due to Nish's arrest. Denise begins getting closer to Ravi, much to Jack's jealousy. When Nish escapes from prison, Denise begins conversing with Ravi regularly to ask about Nish's whereabouts, fearful he will return to exact revenge on her due to her attacking him on Christmas Day. Denise suffers a panic attack when she is pranked by Avani's classmates, who are posing as criminals working for Nish; when Ravi finds her, she confesses to attacking Nish. Ravi decides to keep her secret, expressing his admiration for her instead. The two kiss on Christmas Day 2024, but Denise asks Ravi to give her space as she considers whether to pursue a full relationship. On New Year's Day, Denise follows Nugget and discovers Nish is alive, having faked his death. She confronts Nish and he hits her over the head with a champagne bottle. Jack finds Denise in a serious condition at the house and she recovers in hospital shortly after Nish is killed by Ravi. Denise is encouraged by Suki to support Ravi, who feels guilty. Ravi confesses the murder to Denise and encourages her to stay away from him, but Denise continues to support him and the two have sex. They are later caught kissing by Nugget, who they encourage to keep quiet. Jack arranges for Raymond to change his name in order to woo Denise; the affair is later exposed, causing Chelsea to disown Denise. Denise later ends her relationship with Ravi after he fights with Jack but continues to harbour feelings for both men. After an explosion destroys the Queen Vic, Linda and Denise muse over the fragility of life; Linda subsequently informs Denise that she has forgiven herself for Keanu's murder and encourages Denise to move on too; this encourages Denise to profess her love to Jack, with the two resuming their relationship.

Denise and Kim support Patrick through his son Anthony's (Nicholas Bailey) murder on Christmas Day 2025 by his daughter Jasmine Fisher (Indeyarna Donaldson-Holness), and orchestrate Patrick meeting his grandson Josh Goodwin (Joshua Vaughan), whom Denise gets a job at the salon. Denise also supports Sam through her diagnosis of breast cancer and begins noticing symptoms of fatigue and ill health herself. She later receives a devastating diagnosis of acute myeloid leukaemia, an aggressive form of blood cancer, and is told that the cancer has a high mortality rate. This diagnosis occurs on the same night that her grandson Jordan is accidentally run over by Ian and left with severe injuries and spinal damage. Denise keeps the diagnosis secret, only confiding in Patrick's wife Yolande (Angela Wynter), and opts to delay her treatment to instead support Chelsea, but finally comes clean about her diagnosis at Kim's engagement party, and agrees to start it. Denise spends a month in hospital undergoing intensive chemotherapy, though it doesn't work as well as hoped. During her time there, Denise befriends a fellow patient, Teyana (Denise Pitter), and is later upset to learn of her death from the same condition. Denise later begins a second round of chemo, but briefly flees the hospital in a wheelchair with Kim's help to intervene when Gray's grandmother, Sheila Atkins (Sheila Ruskin), abducts Jordan. Denise and Kim confront Sheila at the airport and manage to rescue Jordan.

Denise deteriorates further when she develops sepsis and has to be placed into a medically induced coma. The search for a stem cell match becomes urgent, and the Fox-Truemans begin searching for relatives of Denise's biological father. They discover she has a paternal half-brother, Darnell Larson Jr (Christopher Colquhoun), who is a match. Jack and Kim manage to track Darnell down. He initially refuses to do a test to see if he is a match due to a fear of hospitals, caused by the death of his wife, Louisa, but he eventually agrees to do the test after meeting Denise. He tells Denise about their father, Darnell Sr. Kim and her fiancé Howie Danes (Delroy Atkinson) plan to marry with Denise present at the ceremony, but she cannot leave her bed, so they bring the wedding to her, marrying in the hospital room. Darnell eventually agrees to give a sample, but it is not a match, to Denise’s devastation.

== Reception ==
Parish has been nominated for several awards for her portrayal of Denise. In 2007, she was nominated for the "Best Actress" award at the 2007 British Soap Awards, while Denise was nominated in the "I'm A Survivor" category at the All About Soap Bubble Awards. In 2009, Parish was nominated for the "Best Actress" award at the Inside Soap Awards, and in 2010, she received a nomination for the "Best Soap Actress" award at the TV Choice awards. In January 2011, Parish was nominated for "Serial Drama Performance" at The National Television Awards 2011 for her portrayal of Densie but did not make it through to the shortlist. In 2014, she was longlisted for "Best Actress" again at the 2014 British Soap Awards, but did not progress to the shortlist and the award was won by rival soap Coronation Street's Julie Hesmondhalgh, who plays Hayley Cropper in the serial. In August 2017, Parish was longlisted for Best Actress at the Inside Soap Awards. She did not progress to the viewer-voted shortlist. Parish was longlisted for "Best Actress" at the 2026 Inside Soap Awards, whilst Denise's cancer diagnosis was longlisted for "Best Storyline".

In 2009, Ruth Deller of entertainment website Lowculture, who runs a monthly feature chronicling the most popular and unpopular soap opera characters, profiled Denise, stating: "The Foxes are one of the strongest families on EastEnders at the moment, and that's pretty much all down to Denise, who is a-mazing. We also love her frenemy-ness with Zainab." Jim Shelley of the Daily Mirror questioned the credulity of the storyline which saw Lucas hold Denise hostage having faked her suicide. He quoted Denise's line: "Another thing I don't get. Why am I supposed to have killed myself? What 'reason' did I have?!" observing: "NO REASON of course. The writers hadn't even made one up – although that didn't stop Walford CID quickly deciding Denise had killed Owen and Trina even though they had no evidence and she had a watertight alibi." Nathan Bevan of the Wales on Sunday also deemed the storyline far-fetched, commenting: "she'd been kept prisoner in the basement of the abandoned house next door [...] and no one heard her screaming for help through the walls? What part of the East End is this?" Inside Soap stated in January 2011 that whilst Denise headed up the Fox family, they were "a right bunch of miseries" and opined they would party with lively sister Kim and only let Denise come if she "promises to crack a smile". The magazine published a feature about Denise in April 2013, naming the scene where Lucas told Denise she had 'died', her "classic scene". Mark James Lowe called Denise "fiery" and when reviewing Denise's time on the show said, "Denise has never had it easy both blokes. Getting knocked up as a teen by a drug addict – who later became a serial killer – was just the start of her traumas with men. No wonder she considers Ian Beale a catch..."

In 2020, Sara Wallis and Ian Hyland from The Daily Mirror placed Denise 77th on their ranked list of the best EastEnders characters of all time, calling her "formidable" and commented that the character "has survived everything from a bus crash and poverty, to giving up a child for adoption and endless doomed relationships". Marianna Manson from Closer Online put Denise on her list of the 11 most iconic black characters in British soap operas, writing, "Denise has certainly had a time of it since arriving in Walford in 2006. Most notably, when she was kidnapped by her ex, Lucas Johnson, for failing to submit to God. While Denise was being held captive in squalor, Lucas even faked her death. She's been through a lot, our Denise, but EastEnders wouldn't be the same without her or her hilarious sister Kim".

== See also ==
- List of fictional postal employees
