= Marian McLoughlin =

British actress

- Born: Croydon, England
- Occupation: Actress
- Years active: 1977–present
- Children: 2
- Website: marianmcloughlin.co.uk

Marian McLoughlin is a British actress, known for her role as Marina Bonnaire in the BBC soap opera Doctors. She also played the role of Brenda Jacks in the BBC series Home Time in 2009 and Julia in Fast Freddie, The Widow and Me in 2011. In 2021, she appeared in the Channel 4 soap opera Hollyoaks as Sue Morgan, and in 2026 she joined the cast of the BBC soap opera EastEnders as Rose Hawkins.

== Career ==
After training to be a French teacher, she graduated from Newman College, and later took a postgraduate diploma in Drama at Bristol Old Vic Theatre School. Theatre work includes: Henry V, After the Fall and Bartholomew Fair at the Royal National Theatre, Edmond at the Royal Court, and numerous rep companies. TV work includes: series regular in French Fields, Doctors, Home Time, Born to Run, Thin Ice, Castles; period drama Nicholas Nickleby; plus roles in The Impressions Show, EastEnders and The Bill, and many other productions. In 1997, she starred in the BBC drama Born to Run. In 2017 she played Marie in The Girls at the Phoenix Theatre in the West End. In 2021, she was cast in the Channel 4 soap opera Hollyoaks as Sue Morgan and appeared from April. She departed from Hollyoaks in scenes broadcast in July of that year. In July 2026, Hawkins was announced to be joining the cast of the BBC soap opera EastEnders as Rose Hawkins, the mother of established character Nicola Mitchell (Laura Doddington), arriving alongside several other members of the Hawkins family including her other daughters Gemma (Patricia Potter) and Jodie Hawkins (Anna Constable).

== Filmography ==
Television
Year	Title	Role	Notes
1982	Giro City	Martin's secretary	TV film
1986	The Bill	Linda	Episode: “Ringer”
1986	Ladies in Charge	Doris	Episode: “Zoe's Fever”
1988	Tumbledown	Mandy	TV film
1989	French Fields	Sweet Stallholder	Episode: “Who's Been Eating My Porridge?”
1989–1990	The Ruth Rendell Mysteries	Grace	Episodes: “No More Dying Then” and “Some Lie and Some Die”
1990	Screen Two	Sarah	Episode: “He's Asking for Me”
1990	The Labours of Erica	Sabine	Episode: “Cider with Jean Pierre”
1990	South of the Border	Tina	Episode #2.3
1990	The Piglet Files	Mrs Whiteley	Episode: “A Room with a View”
1990	The Bill	Mary Thorn	Episode: “Old Friends”
1991	French Fields	Quarrelling Wife	Episode: “Make for the Hills!”
1991–1993	EastEnders	DCI Chapman	7 episodes
1992	Screen Two	Mrs Healy	Episode: “The Grass Arena”
1992	The Guilty	Maddy Doyle	TV film
1992	The Bill	Joanne Somers	Episodes: “Minefield” and “Occupational Hazard”
1992	Kinsey	Judy Kinsey	6 episodes (series 2)
1993	Casualty	Ann Weston	Episode: “No Place to Hide”
1993	Medics	Anne Cornforth	2 episodes
1994	Cracker	Catherine Carter	Episode: “Men Should Weep (Part One)”
1995	Dangerfield	Moira Keen	Episode: “The Accidental Shooting”
1995	The Bill	Mrs Riley	Episode: “Alone”
1995	Pie in the Sky	Jean Barratt	Episode: “The One That Got Away”
1995	Castles	Rachel Castle	24 episodes
1995	Wycliffe	Fiona Jay	Episode: “Lost Contact”
1995	Screen Two	Jackie	Episode: “Nervous Energy”
1995	Coogan's Run	Mrs Fraser	Episode: “Natural Born Quizzers”
1996	Casualty	Marian Wingate	Episode: “Asking for Miracles”
1996	The Bill	Maggie Grove	Episode: “Big Bullies”
1996	The Fragile Heart	Margaret Sedgley	3 episodes
1997	In Your Dreams	Police doctor	TV film
1997	Born to Run	Bronson Flitch	6 episodes
1997	The Bill	DI Noble	Episode: “Lucky Day”
1997	One Foot in the Grave	Betty McVitie	Episode: “Endgame”
1998	Wycliffe	Lynne Carney	Episode: “Land's End”
1998	Verdict	Jane McHugh	Episode: “Neighbours from Hell”
1999	Holby City	Dr Shelley	Episode: “Staying Alive: Part 2”
1999	Grafters	Pippa	8 episodes (series 2)
2000	Peak Practice	Ann Garwood	Episode: “Skin Deep”
2001	Silent Witness	Mary Townsend	Episode: “Two Below Zero”
2001	The Life and Adventures of Nicholas Nickleby	Madame Mantalini	TV film
2001	The Fabulous Bagel Boys	Avril Rose	
2001	Table 12	Jan	Episode: “Side Order”
2001	Midsomer Murders	Barbara Judd	Episode: “Dark Autumn”
2001	Dalziel and Pascoe	ACC Belinda Kennedy	Episode: "Walls of Silence”
2001	The Bill	Janie Walker	Episode: “Money Man”
2003	Loving You	DS Vicky Griggs	TV film
2003	20 Things To Do Before You're 30	Mrs Lynch	Episode 4
2003	Down to Earth	Mrs Daly	Episode: “Honesty”
2003	William and Mary	Trish	2 episodes
2003	The Bill	Jean Kendall	Episode: “Pandora's Box”
2004	Foyle's War	Postmistress	Episode: “They Fought in the Fields”
2006	Thin Ice	Barbara	6 episodes
2006	Blue Murder	Jo Waverley	Episode: “Steady Eddie”
2007	Party Animals	Barbara Foster	Episode 3
2007	New Tricks	Shirley White	Episode: “Casualty”
2007	The Omid Djalili Show		2 episodes
2008	Lewis	Phoebe	Episode: “The Great and the Good”
2008	Midsomer Murders	Gwen Morrison	Episode: “They Seek Him Here”
2008	Doctors	Margaret Watson	Episode: “Making Your Bed”
2008	Holby Blue	Marilyn	Episode #2.11
2009	The Bill	Chrissie MacLeish	Episode: “Feet of Clay: Part Two”
2009	Home Time	Brenda Jacks	6 episodes
2010	Doctors	Sue Finglesham	Episode: “Freddie's Final Fling”
2010	The Impressions Show with Culshaw and Stephenson	Delia	
2011	Fast Freddie, The Widow and Me	Julia	TV film
2011–2012	Doctors	Marina Bonnaire	49 episodes Nominated for British Soap Award for Villain of the Year 2012
2012	Silent Witness	Deborah Harding	Episode: “Death Has No Dominion, Part 2”
2012	Spy	Mrs Godfrey	Episode: “Codename: Ball Busted”
2013	Jo	Mrs Beatrice	Episode: “Notre Dame”
2013	Holby City	Coroner Valerie	Episode: “Home”
2013	Truckers	Judy	Episode 4
2014	Boomers	Pauline	Episode 5
2015	SunTrap	Barbara	Episode: “Look Who's Talking”
2020	Vera	Tina Tripp	Episode: “Blood Will Tell”
2020	Casualty	Lil Weakes	Episode #34.23
2020	Trying	Jilly Newman	TV series, 11 episodes
2021	Hollyoaks	Sue Morgan	Series regular
2026–present	EastEnders	Rose Hawkins	Series regular

Film
Year	Title	Role	Notes
1985	And Then There Was One		
1987	Aria	Kate	
1988	The Zip	Sue	
1989	Malevolence	Mary Haig	
1994	A Business Affair	Dinner Guest	
1997	Spice World	hospital parent	
2000	P.O.V.		
2006	Poppies	Bea Daly	

== Theatre ==
Date	Title	Role	Director	Company / Theatre
1977 – 1978	A View from the Bridge		Adrian Noble	Bristol Old Vic / Theatre Royal, Bristol
1977 – 1978	The Shoemaker's Holiday		David Phethean	Bristol Old Vic / Theatre Royal, Bristol
16 April 1980 –	The Dover Road		Michael Napier Brown	Cheltenham Repertory Company / Everyman Theatre, Cheltenham
1985 – 1986	Edmond		Richard Eyre	Royal Court Theatre
14 October 1988 – 1 April 1989	Bartholomew Fair	Alice	Richard Eyre	Royal National Theatre
15 June 1990 – 1991	After the Fall	Felice	Michael Blakemore	Royal National Theatre
14 May 2003 – 20 August 2003	Henry V	Alice	Nicholas Hytner	Royal National Theatre
28 January 2017 – 15 July 2017	The Girls	Marie	Tim Firth	Phoenix Theatre, London
29 June 2018 – 14 July 2018	Love and Information		Caroline Steinbeis	Crucible Theatre, Sheffield
8 February 2019 – 23 February 2019	Rutherford and Son	Aunt Ann	Caroline Steinbeis	Crucible Theatre, Sheffield
