= Christopher Colquhoun =

English actor (born 1970)

- Born: 10 January 1970 (age 56); Sheffield, South Yorkshire, England
- Education: Royal Academy of Dramatic Art
- Occupation: Actor
- Years active: 1995-present

Christopher Colquhoun (pron: ca-HOON) (born 10 January 1970) is an English actor. He is known for appearing as Simon Kaminski in the BBC drama series Casualty, from 2002 to 2004; he also appeared in Holby City in this role. Colquhoun also played Jake Quinn in The Bill for two episodes – "An Honour to Serve", parts 1 and 2 – and appeared as pathologist Dr Tony Carmichael in the seventh season of Vera, screened during 2017.

Colquhoun trained at RADA. He played Hector in William Shakespeare's play Troilus & Cressida, which was shown in the 2009 season at Shakespeare's Globe theatre in London. On 4 December 2009, he joined the cast of Coronation Street as Matt Davis, departing in the episode broadcast on 22 February 2010.

In 2014, Colquhoun played Joff in The Believers at the Tricycle, London, and Scar in The Lion King on its UK tour.

From 2017 to 2020, he played Special Agent Derek Crown in the TV series Absentia. Colquhoun played James Cleverly MP in the 2025 BBC One mini-series Prisoner 951.

On 11 August 2026, the BBC announced that Colquhoun would be joining the cast of EastEnders as Darnell Larson Jr, the long-lost half-brother of established character Denise Fox (Diane Parish). The character first appeared in Episode 7,388, broadcast on 25 August 2026.
