= Anna Constable =

English actress (born 1999)

- Born: Anna-Marie Darcy Constable; 1999 (age 26–27); Southampton, England
- Occupation: Actress
- Years active: 2022–present
- Television: EastEnders

Anna-Marie Darcy Constable (born 1999) is a British actress from Southampton. After graduating from the Royal Central School of Speech and Drama, she went on to star in stage productions of Imposter 22 and A Small Enclosed Room, before joining the cast of BBC soap opera EastEnders in 2026 as Jodie Hawkins.

== Life and career ==
Anna Constable was born in Southampton, England, and grew up on the Isle of Wight. She has autism and Noonan syndrome. She attended a Performance Making course, designed for adults with autism and learning difficulties at the Royal Central School of Speech and Drama, and after graduating in 2023, she went on to star in a production of Imposter 22 the same year. In January 2025, she starred in A Small Enclosed Room at the Lowry theatre in Manchester, a play exploring masking, autism, and mental health issues. In 2026, she played the lead character Jenny in 'New Bloom', a short film by Bedazzle Inclusive Productions.

In July 2026, it was announced that Constable would be joining the cast of the BBC soap opera EastEnders as Jodie Hawkins, a member of the newly introduced Hawkins family and youngest sister of established character Nicola Mitchell (Laura Doddington). Speaking about joining the show, Constable said: "Growing up watching EastEnders I never thought a disabled actress like me could ever land a role like this. But here I am loud and proud and taking no prisoners in mine or Jodie's wake".

== Filmography ==
| Year | Title | Role | Notes | Ref. |
|---|---|---|---|---|
| 2026 | New Bloom | Jenny | Short film | |
| 2026–present | EastEnders | Jodie Hawkins | Regular role | |

== Stage ==
- Imposter 22 (2023)
- A Small Enclosed Room (2025)
