= Penny Branning =

Fictional character from EastEnders

- EastEnders character
- Kitty Castledine as Penny Branning (2024)
- Portrayed by: Mia McKenna-Bruce (2008); Kitty Castledine (2024–present)
- Duration: 2008, 2024–present
- First appearance: Episode 3512; 21 January 2008
- Introduced by: Diederick Santer (2008); Chris Clenshaw (2024)
In-universe information
- Occupation: Drug dealer; Market stallholder; Wine bar manager
- Family: Branning
- Father: Jack Branning
- Mother: Selina Branning
- Stepfather: James
- Stepmother: Ronnie Mitchell; Denise Fox
- Half-brothers: Ricky Branning; James Branning
- Half-sisters: Amy Mitchell
- Sons: Ethan Branning-Panesar
- Grandfathers: Jim Branning
- Grandmothers: Reenie Branning
- Uncles: Derek Branning; Max Branning
- Aunts: April Branning; Carol Jackson; Suzy Branning
- Nieces: Charli Slater
- First cousins: Joey Branning; Alice Branning; Bianca Jackson; Robbie Jackson; Sonia Fowler; Billie Jackson; Kevin; Rebecca; Bradley Branning; Lauren Branning; Abi Branning; Oscar Branning; Annie Carter
- Other relatives: Liam Butcher; Tiffany Butcher; Morgan Butcher; Sami Jackson; Bex Fowler; Julia Fowler; Louie Beale; Jimmy Beale; Abi Branning Jnr

Penny Branning is a fictional character from the BBC soap opera EastEnders. She was originally portrayed by Mia McKenna-Bruce and appeared from 21 January to 1 February 2008, and again from 15 to 18 April. In November 2023, the role was recast to Kitty Castledine with the character returning on 1 January 2024 alongside her cousin Lauren Branning (Jacqueline Jossa).

Penny is the daughter of established character Jack (Scott Maslen) and Selina Branning (Daisy Beaumont), the half-sister of Amy Mitchell (Ellie Dadd) and Ricky Branning (Frankie Day). Since her return, Penny's storylines have included a drug-dealing career and framing Lauren for smuggling, manipulating her way into a managerial position at Peggy's wine bar and the aftermath of a crowd collapse and crush that occurs there under her supervision, teaming up with Harry Mitchell (Elijah Holloway) to exact revenge on her father, a relationship with Vinny Panesar (Shiv Jalota), finding out she is pregnant and discovering her baby may be fathered by Harry rather than Vinny.

== Development ==
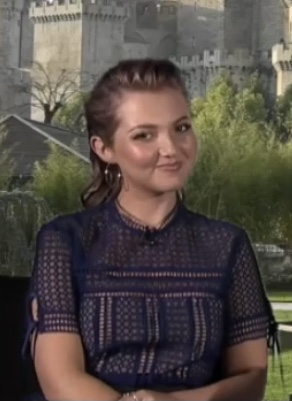
Mia McKenna-Bruce (pictured) originally played Penny, in her 2008 stint.

In 2008, executive producer Diederick Santer decided to explore the family of established character, Jack Branning (Maslen), to give him more of a detailed backstory. This was used by bringing in Penny and her mother, Selina Branning (Beaumont) as recurring characters. Mia McKenna-Bruce was cast in the role of Penny, and appeared in two separate guest stints, one from January to February, and another in April, both that year.

In November 2023, it was announced Penny would be heading back to Walford with her cousin Lauren Branning (Jossa). This time, the character was made regular. It was decided that the character would be recast and the role was given to Kitty Castledine. Castledine expressed she was thrilled to be joining the show, due to watching it while growing up.

"My whole family are EastEnders fans, and I remember sitting on my Nanny Kay’s lap to tune in, [...] The inclusion of disabled talent on screen is so important to me as a wheelchair user, so I’m thrilled to be playing a character as feisty and cool as Penny."

— Kitty Castledine on her casting as Penny.

Executive producer Chris Clenshaw said on the casting announcement, "It's been a long time since Penny Branning was in Walford, and she's a very different person from the one our viewers might remember." About her character's representation of wheelchair users, Castledine said, "It's really important that disability is visible on screen, because there hasn't been a lot of representation, and I'm proud to be someone representing disability."

On her casting announcement, Castledine said, "Penny is great. She's so cool, and she's got this dry humour that I love." When describing Penny to The Mirror, Castledine said, "Penny is a firecracker, 100%. [Penny and Lauren] kick up a storm from the outset and bring some of that classic Branning drama back to Walford. [...] Her morals are all over the place, [...] She has a real sense of destiny, she knows what she wants and she'll get it – she doesn't really care who is in the way." Castledine later opened up about her character's issues with familial relationships and friendships. She said in an interview with Inside Soap, "I don't think she's used to having people around her who want to be with her and care for her. She has a coping mechanism where she tends to push people away, which is tricky when you're in Walford and everyone relies on friends and family. It doesn't really win her any friends, which is a shame, because Penny is so fun to be around."

Penny was Chelsea Fox's (Abrahams) step-sister and due to this, Penny persuades Chelsea to give her a trial shift at Peggy's wine bar. Penny convinces Chelsea to have a drink while working and she is demoted by Phil Mitchell (McFadden). Out of spite, Chelsea messes with the amount of tickets at an event at Peggy's, which causes a crowd crush. On her relationship with Chelsea, Castledine said to Inside Soap, "I think in that moment she lets her ego get the better of her. Penny does love her family, but sometimes in the heat of the moment she forgets that. It does end up prompting some bad blood between Penny and Chelsea, which is a shame."

== Storylines ==
Penny is mentioned to be the daughter of established character Jack Branning (Scott Maslen). Jack's girlfriend Ronnie Mitchell (Samantha Womack) finds tickets for a ballet, which Jack says are for Penny, as it is her birthday and she loves dancing. Ronnie meets Penny and Selina, and Selina asks Ronnie whether she knows why Penny is paralysed from the waist down and uses a wheelchair. Jack claims that when he was a police officer, he caught a drug dealer who deliberately hit Penny with his car when she and Selina were waiting at a bus stop, but it is later revealed that Jack was a corrupt officer taking payment from a drugs baron in return for tip-offs, and that when Jack was unable to tip off the baron and he was arrested, one of his associates carried out the attack in revenge. Jack takes Penny and Selina out for Penny's birthday, and afterwards they kissed in Selina's flat. Selina revealed the next day how upset Penny was that Jack was not there when she woke up. Selina decided to move to France where her parents lived, taking Penny with her. Penny visits Jack in April 2008 and is cold towards Ronnie, preferring to go shopping with her aunt Tanya Branning (Jo Joyner). Penny does not want to return to France but is persuaded by Jack.

Fifteen years later, Penny returns to Walford with her cousin, Lauren Branning (Jacqueline Jossa) and Lauren's son, Louie Beale (Jake McNally), after they had been living in France. It is revealed that Penny is being blackmailed by Juliette Dubois (Lily Catalifo) into smuggling drugs. Penny, Lauren and Louie arrive in England and a sniffer dog detects Penny's drugs in Lauren's bag at the airport, leading to her arrest. Jack and Louie's father Peter Beale (Thomas Law) suspects that Penny planted the drugs on Lauren, so Penny hands herself in to the police. Penny declines a lawyer and Jack then instructs her to take any deal she's offered. Jack relays the information about Juliette to the police. In a blackmail attempt, Penny pushes herself out of her wheelchair to blame it on the inspector in order to make a deal linked to her and Lauren being released, but is caught in the act as the inspector reveals that there are two cameras. The inspector asks Penny to confess everything about Juliette so that she and Lauren can go. Lauren is released but is angry when Penny confesses to her about planting the drugs; she plans to leave Walford with Louie, but, after a conversation with Sonia Fowler (Natalie Cassidy), the cousins make up and move in together. Peter is initially unhappy about this but Penny convinces him that she is not a bad person.

Penny supports her half-sister Amy Mitchell (Ellie Dadd) over her relationship with her boyfriend, Denzel Danes (Jaden Ladega). Penny temporarily becomes the owner of Whitney Dean's (Shona McGarty) clothing stall when she leaves Walford. Penny later flirts with Harry Mitchell (Elijah Holloway) and they have sex, though she hides this from Jack. Penny arranges a promotional night at Peggy's wine bar with Chelsea Fox (Zaraah Abrahams). Penny manipulates Chelsea into drinking on the job, who is caught by her boss Phil Mitchell (Steve McFadden). Chelsea is sacked and Penny takes the job, insulting Chelsea and belittling her. Chelsea attempts to tell Phil about Penny's true ways but he does not listen. Penny continues to be a manipulative manager to Chelsea. Penny later arranges a carnival night to prove herself as manager, but the booking is sabotaged by Chelsea and a crowd crush occurs. Penny panics when she notices Amy trapped, but things escalate when the crowd stampede and Penny is knocked out of her wheelchair. Penny panics that someone has died, but everyone survives. Amy's condition stabilises in hospital, but Penny is later taken in for questioning after CCTV proves illegal tickets were distributed. Penny tries to prove her innocence to Jack, but fails to do so, and he admits his favouritism for Amy. When Penny comes under fire for being accused of causing the crush at Peggy's, Harry is there for her and the two become closer.

Upon finding out that Chelsea was responsible and that Jack essentially chose Chelsea over Penny, Penny asks Harry for his help in getting revenge on Jack. Harry comes across Jack on the square and teases him, which ends up with Jack punching him in the face. Harry finds out that Tommy Moon (Sonny Kendall) recorded this altercation and pays him £50 to get the video. Harry then confirms that he will aid Penny in taking down Jack. They create a plan to pretend to have ended their relationship in their plan to destroy Jack. Jack then contacts one of his co-workers in the police and tells Penny that he has found out that Harry is dangerous, telling her that the police believe Harry may have killed his ex-girlfriend, Shireen Bashar, who went missing a few months ago. Penny doesn't care and continues seeing Harry. Jack, unaware that Harry and Penny are still seeing each other, tells her that he's going to meet a witness that knew Harry and Shireen back in Dartford, Felicity Hall (Rose Shalloo). Penny convinces Jack to let her meet Felicity instead, hoping to convince her not to make a witness statement. However, Felicity's story turns Penny against Harry and he is arrested. After he is released, Harry and his mother, Nicola Mitchell (Laura Doddington), gun for Penny.

In 2025, Penny and Harry have a one-night stand, leading to her getting pregnant. At first, Penny thinks her short-term boyfriend Vinny Panesar (Shiv Jalota), whom she is in love with, is the father of her unborn child but a scan reveals the dates don't match, meaning Harry is the father. Nicola suspects that Harry is the father and threatens Penny into taking a DNA test, but Penny gets her cousin Oscar Branning (Pierre Counihan-Moullier) to get her fake results to show Nicola that Vinny is the father, not Harry.

== Reception ==
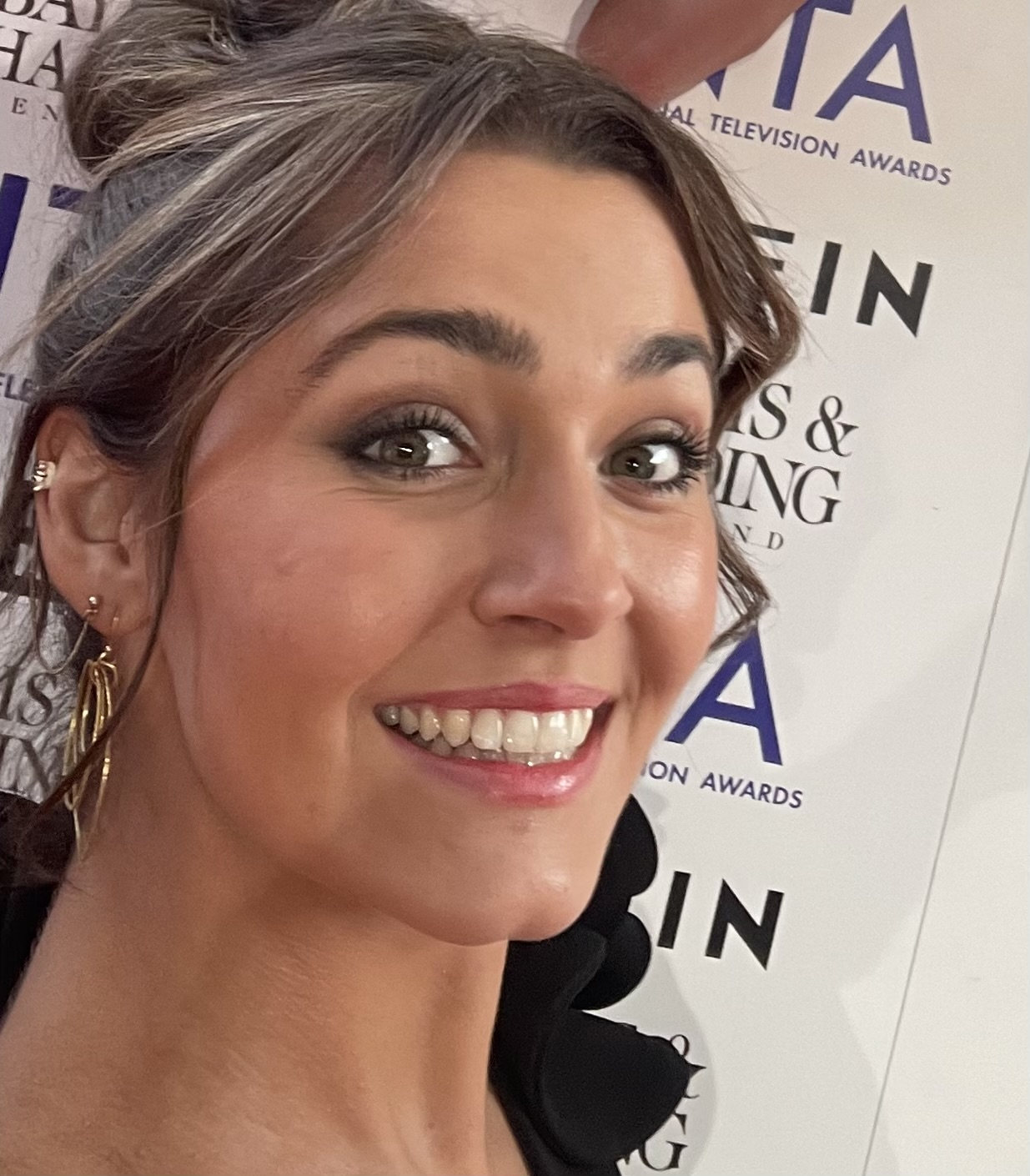
Metro has described Penny as a 'major' character, since Kitty Castledine's (pictured) introduction as Penny.

In 2021, Kyle O'Sullivan from the Daily Mirror opined that Jack seemed to have "forgotten" about Penny. Before her return aired, some EastEnders viewers believed that the timing of Penny's return seemed strange, and speculated that her and Lauren could be returning for Jack's funeral, and he could be the victim of The Six storyline. In January 2024, Metro journalist Melissa Parker wrote, "I feel I know Penny; I know disabled women like her. We will only have achieved enough for and in disability representation when we bring these disabled women and their well-hidden stories to the forefront of media – and celebrate them." When Jack sees her leaving her flat with Harry Mitchell (Holloway), after the pair slept together, fans described the scene as "cringey" and "awkward" with mixed reviews. Similarly, MyLondon called the scenes were 'dirty'. In October, Ash Percival, also from Metro, described Penny as a "major" character, after only nine months since returning to the soap. When it seemed possible that Penny might be leaving the soap, viewers expressed their sadness over this on social media. In May 2024, Chloe Timms from Inside Soap wrote that Penny should be on seen onscreen more, commenting that the character had "made a big impact" and joking that Penny "has the best hair on the Square".
