= Kitty Castledine =

English actress (born 2002)

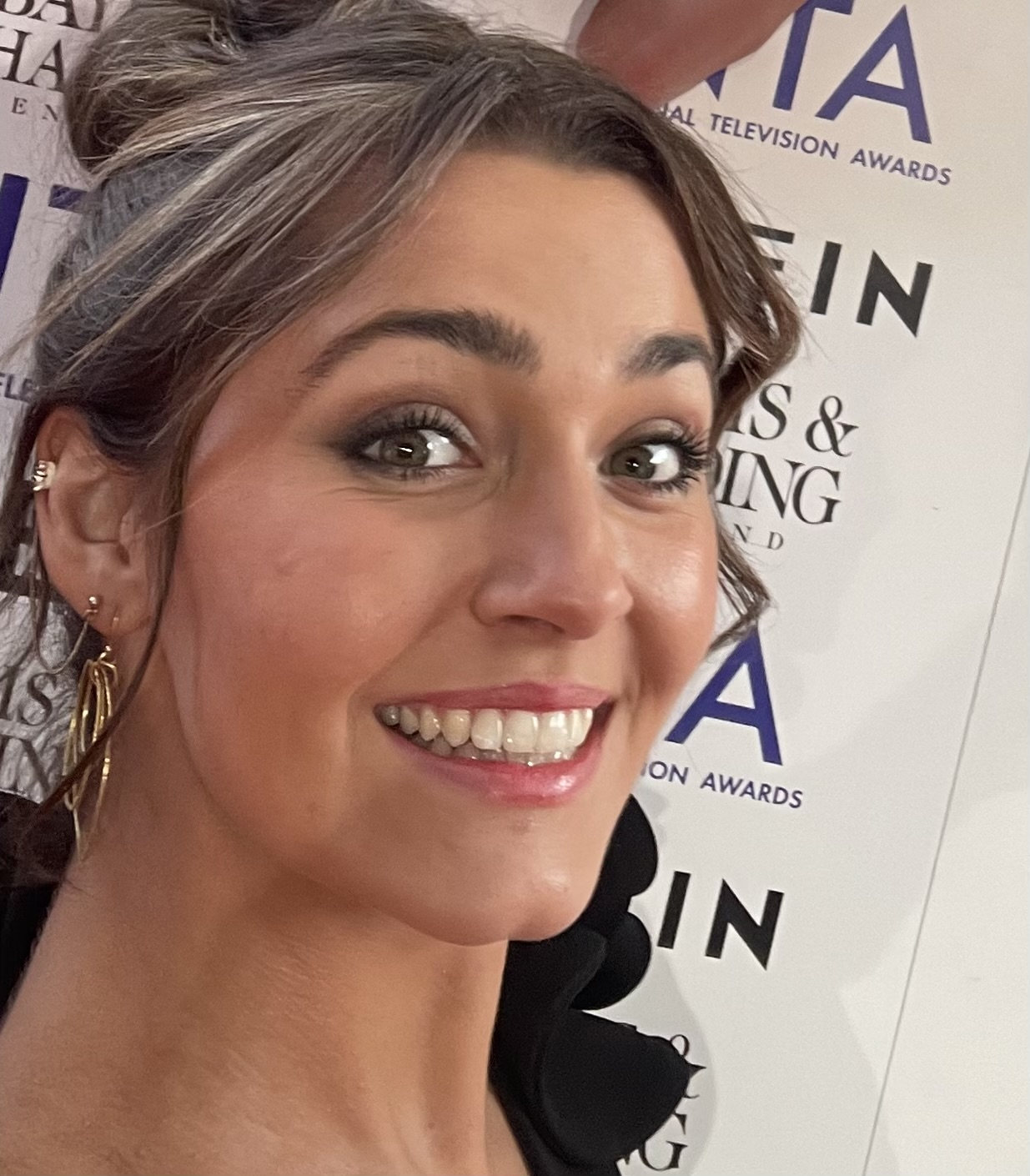
- Castledine in 2024
- Born: 22 August 2002 (age 24); Kingston, Surrey, England
- Occupation: Actress
- Years active: 2021–present
- Television: EastEnders
- Parents: Stewart Castledine (father); Lucy Alexander (mother)
- Relatives: Leo Castledine (brother)

Kitty Castledine (born 22 August 2002) is an English actress. Castledine is known for portraying the role of Penny Branning on the BBC soap opera EastEnders (2024–present).

== Early life and education ==
Kitty Castledine was born on 22 August 2002 in Kingston upon Thames, Greater London, the daughter of former professional footballer Stewart Castledine and TV presenter Lucy Alexander. She is also the sister of Leo Castledine, who plays for Middlesbrough. In 2010 when she was seven, Castledine was diagnosed with transverse myelitis, which left her paralysed from her waist down, following a virus.

Castledine trained at London Academy of Music and Dramatic Art (LAMDA).

== Career ==
In 2021, Castledine was cast in The Break as Katy for one episode, which was Castledine's first acting role. In 2023, Castledine was cast for the role of Maggie in a short film Monotropa. In 2024, Castledine was cast in a TV series Grace as Emma Brice for one episode.

In 2024, Castledine took over the role of Penny Branning from Mia McKenna-Bruce on the BBC soap opera EastEnders. Castledine's storylines on the soap have included sneaking illegal substances into the country and framing Lauren Branning (Jacqueline Jossa), a relationship with Harry Mitchell (Elijah Holloway), a feud with Chelsea Fox (Zaraah Abrahams) after Chelsea was fired by Phil Mitchell (Steve McFadden) and Penny replaced her in the job, and her involvement in the crush at Peggy's. Castledine opened up on Penny's disability and challenges in Albert Square, saying: "Not everything is accessible in life. And it's awful; it needs to change." Castledine also spoke out to the Daily Mirror adding: "It's really important that disability is visible on screen, because there hasn't been a lot of representation, and I'm proud to be someone representing disability."

== Filmography ==
Year	Title	Role	Notes	Ref.
2021	The Break	Katy	Guest role; 1 episode	
2023	Monotropa	Maggie	Short film	
2024– present	EastEnders	Penny Branning	Regular role	
2024	Grace	Emma Brice	Guest role; 1 episode	
