= Basil Brush =

Fox puppet from British children's TV (since 1962)

- First appearance: The Three Scampis (1962)
- Created by: Ivan Owen; Peter Firmin
- Portrayed by: Ivan Owen (1962–2000); Michael Winsor (2000–present)

In-universe information
- Species: Fox
- Gender: Male
- Significant other: Roxy
- Relatives: Mortimer and Herr Brush (Cousins), Bingo and Bungo Brush (nephews)
- Nationality: English

Basil Brush is a fictional anthropomorphic fox best known for his appearances on daytime British children's television. He is primarily portrayed by a glove puppet, but has also been depicted in animated cartoon shorts, books, annuals and comic strips. The character has featured on children's television from the 1960s to the present day. He has also appeared in pantomimes across the UK.

A mischievous character and a raconteur, Basil Brush is best known for his catchphrase "Boom! Boom!", used after bursting out laughing at one of his own jokes, and also for speaking in a "posh" accent and manner, referring to himself as a "fella". The character claims to dislike puppets, and says his most prized possession is his brush, this being the traditional name for a fox's tail. He publicly supports Leicester City Football Club, often nicknamed "The Foxes".

== 1962–1968 ==
The original Basil Brush glove puppet was designed by Peter Firmin in 1962 for an ITV television series and was voiced and performed by Ivan Owen until his death in October 2000.

Ivan Owen took great care to ensure that he, personally, never received any publicity. Professionally, only Basil had a public persona, with Owen himself remaining entirely unknown. This helped give the character believability, making Basil appear to be real, since—unlike Harry Corbett and Sooty, for example—the audience never saw the puppeteer. Owen modelled Basil's voice on the actor Terry-Thomas, giving the puppet a touch of well-cultivated class.

Basil first appeared on television in 1962, in a series called The Three Scampis, a story of an out-of-work circus act. The human was Howard Williams, Ivan Owen animated and voiced Basil and Wally Whyton animated and voiced Spike McPike, a very aggressive Scottish hedgehog also made by Peter Firmin.

In the mid-1960s, Basil became a supporting act for the magician David Nixon, upstaging Nixon on the latter's BBC1 show Nixon at Nine-Five in 1967 and The Nixon Line (1967–68), to such good effect that Basil was offered his own show.

== The Basil Brush Show (1968–1980) ==
The Basil Brush Show ran for 12 years from 1968 to 1980, in which he was supported by various famous stooges: first, in 1968, by the actor Rodney Bewes, known on the show as "Mr Rodney"; next, from 1969 to 1973, by the actor Derek Fowlds (known as "Mr Derek"); then until 1976 by actor and singer Roy North ("Mr Roy"); then by "Mr Howard" Howard Williams, who was in the original "Three Scampies"; and finally by "Mr Billy" (Billy Boyle). By the mid-1970s, the show was aimed at a family audience, so it was usually broadcast on BBC1 in an early evening timeslot on Saturdays. This, plus a degree of sophistication in the humour (which often included topical political jokes), helped give Basil a broad mainstream appeal.

The show was recorded with a studio audience and usually ran for about 25 minutes. The format typically featured an introduction by Basil and his stooge (Mr Rodney, Mr Derek, etc.), in which they would do a few jokes; this was followed by a comedy sketch, featuring topical jokes about a then-current subject (for instance, a sketch set on board an aeroplane flying them to a holiday in Spain, loosely based around the hit pop song "Y Viva España"); then a musical item, featuring a guest singer or group (these included some of the best known singers of the day, top stars such as Demis Roussos in 1973, Petula Clark in 1979, and Cilla Black — big stars vied to get on the show, which had a large audience); sometimes the guest singer would do a song straight, but then also do a comic duet with Basil.

Finally, the show would conclude with 'storytime', in which the straight man would read aloud from a serial story about the adventures of some fictitious historical relative of Basil's – for instance 'Bulldog' Basil, or Blast-Off Basil and his journey to the stars (a Star Trek spoof), or Basil de Farmer, the knight in shining armour (a Robin Hood spoof); or at least he would attempt to, whilst being continually interrupted by a string of jokes and humorous remarks (often concerning "Dirty Gertie from Number Thirty") from Basil. At this point, in the mid-1970s, Basil would often get out Little Ticker, his clockwork wind-up dog, and have it do humorous tricks at the side, almost off-camera, in order to distract the audience and thereby take the rise out of Mr Roy. Each week's story ended on a cliffhanger and the catchphrase "and that's all we've got time for this week, Basil", followed by protestations from Basil which would lead into a final song, based upon that week's serial story, whilst the closing credits rolled.

== 1980s ==
A dispute in 1980 led to the show's cancellation. Ivan Owen aspired to a mid-evening timeslot, to which the BBC were unwilling to agree. In 1982, the puppet reappeared on television in Let's Read With Basil Brush, an infant schools programme on ITV produced by Granada Television. Basil eventually returned to the BBC as co-host of the long-running children's television series Crackerjack, broadcast at 4:55 pm on Fridays during the 1983–84 season.

Basil Brush also performed in the theatre, regularly appearing live in Pantomime at Christmas; usually co-starring at the top of the bill with a well-known singer or comedian. His pantomime co-stars during the 1960s included the singer Cilla Black. After the television show's cancellation in 1980, Basil ended his partnership with Mr Billy and teamed up once again with Howard Williams ("Mr Howard"); they toured in a live stage show, capitalising on Basil's celebrity and continuing popularity as a result of thirteen years on TV.

During this period, Basil also featured in his own cartoon strip in the children's publication TV Comic, published weekly in Britain by Polystyle Publications.

== 2000s relaunch ==
In September 1997, Ivan Owen and Peter Firmin sold the rights to Basil Brush to Bill Haslam, a Cornwall-based businessman and a longtime fan of the character. Haslam formed a Southampton-based company called "Boom! Boom!" with the aim of relaunching Basil Brush with a new television series and public appearances.

After Haslam's attempts at relaunching Basil went to little avail, leading to a £55,000 loss, he sold Boom! Boom! to children's media company SKD Media (later Entertainment Rights) in July 1999, and joined SKD in help to relaunch the property with a new television series. In August 2000, Entertainment Rights announced a new six-episode sitcom series titled Foxed, in co-production with Talent Television, and was in talks with both BBC and ITV for the series' pre-sale. After a toy-deal with Hasbro was confirmed, the series was retooled and became The Basil Brush Show, which in January 2002 was announced to air on the CBBC Channel in the Autumn. However, the series would instead be co-produced with The Foundation.

The series, while still maintaining the faithfulness of the original series, was in the format of a children's sitcom that took place in a flat. Basil who is now performed and voiced by Michael Winsor was joined by a new comic foil, Mr Stephen, played by Christopher Pizzey, who was later replaced with his Northern Irish cousin Liam (Michael Byers) in 2006. Two new child friends - the moneymaking child Dave (Michael Hayes) and the more sensible Molly (Georgina Leonidas) (who were Stephen's nephew and niece), in addition to other characters like Madison, who lived upstairs, and Anil (Ajay Chhabra), a crazy café owner and inept cook. Anil's niece, Lucy (Janine Vieira in Season 5 and Madeline Castrey in Season 6), appeared in the last two seasons in place of Molly as the female child friend of Basil. Basil Brush now had a family, which included his destructive, hyperactive but cute nephew Bingo, and his criminal cousin Mortimer. Several personalities made cameo appearances on the show. These included Eamonn Holmes and Ainsley Harriott.

The original shows had been recorded before a studio audience, composed mainly of children, but the new programme used a post-production laughter track instead of an audience. Interspersed with the main programme, there were animated shorts in which Basil and/or another character is seen making jokes. The more recent puppet looks different from the original 1960s/1970s puppet in a number of aspects and, apart from being well-spoken, the voice of Basil is very different from the original Ivan Owen version. Basil Brush often breaks the fourth wall by having shots of the set and making references to how long the show is, and abusing the obvious way of walking across to other scenes.

== Preservation ==
In November 2016, the British Film Institute announced that The Basil Brush Show would be digitised as part of the BFI's five-year strategy for 2017–2022 to preserve programmes from the 1970s and 80s. Many of the tapes at the BFI's Conservation Centre in Hertfordshire were reportedly deteriorating and at risk of becoming unplayable. Since October 2023, the Film is Fabulous! project has reported a recovery of three episodes from the fourth series of The Basil Brush Show. Prior to this discovery, no episodes from this series were present in the archives; however, episodes 2, 6, and 10 of the 15 episode series now exist in the archives.

== Other appearances ==
Basil has appeared in other television shows, live shows and books:

- The Goodies - two episodes: "The Goodies Rule – O.K.? (1975), where he is a member of the Puppet Government and A Kick in the Arts (1980), where he cameos in a fox hunting scene
- Fantasy Football League (1993) with Frank Skinner and David Baddiel; it was his first television appearance in a decade. Basil's fantasy football team for the series included Norwich City midfielder, Ruel Fox
- Stick It Out (1993) a Comic Relief song with Right Said Fred and other celebrity friends
- Basil's Cartoon Story Book (1994) - a collection of 24 animated children's stories from around the world and presented by Basil Brush.
- French & Saunders' sketch "Harry Potter and the Secret Chamberpot of Azerbaijan" for Comic Relief Red Nose Day 2003, where Basil played Dobby the house elf
- The Weakest Link (2005) Basil won, receiving £10,900 for his chosen charity, Blue Peter's appeal in aid of Childline
- Comic Relief's version of The Proclaimers' I'm Gonna Be (500 Miles) (2007) Basil had a cameo as one among an audience of celebrity guests observing Brian Potter and Andy Pipkin
- Basil and Barney's Swap Shop (2008-2010) - he co-hosted a BBC gameshow series
- Talkin' 'Bout Your Generation (2010) as the show's first international guest
- Pointless Celebrities (2015, 2016) in two episodes featuring children's TV presenters
- The Last Leg (2016, 2021, 2022) Basil appeared on the Christmas special. He also appeared via a Zoom call on 26 February 2021 under the pretext to discuss giving secret messages in his programmes in the 1960s and 1970s. On 28 January 2022, he reappeared for a short cameo as a temporary host, possibly in reference to Russia invading Ukraine and appointing a "puppet" leader
- The Chase (2017, 2022) where he won £7,666.66 (1/3 of £23,000) for charity. Basil returned in 2022
- Hypothetical (2021) as one of the celebrities in The Great Wall of Celebrities round.
- QI (2022), in an episode that formed part of the BBC's 100th anniversary commemorations, alongside host Sandi Toksvig and regular panelist Alan Davies
- Inside Number 9 touring stage version. Basil appeared as a mystery guest where his ad-libbing resulted in Steve Pemberton and Reece Shearsmith corpsing

== See also ==
- Entertainment Rights
- CBBC
- List of BBC children's television programmes
