= Laura Burns (Hollyoaks) =

Fictional character from Hollyoaks

- Hollyoaks character
- Portrayed by: Lesley Johnston
- Duration: 2000–2002
- First appearance: 27 November 2000
- Last appearance: 23 December 2002
- Introduced by: Jo Hallows
In-universe information
- Brothers: Brendan Shepard

Laura Burns (also Kerry Shepard) is a fictional character from the British soap opera Hollyoaks, played by Lesley Johnston between November 2000 and 2002. Johnston was cast via the first "Hollyoaks: On the Pull" campaign, which was designed to find new acting talent at open auditions. Laura is introduced into the series as a new college student and her backstory detailed that she grew up in a care home. Writers explored a brief relationship story between Laura and Luke Morgan (Gary Lucy). More emphasis was placed on her obsession with her best friend Mandy Richardson (Sarah Jayne Dunn). Writers explored Laura's characterisation as a schemer intent on controlling Mandy. She moves into Mandy's home and eventually behaves in a sinister way towards her. Writers introduced her brother, Brendan Shepard (Michael Byers) to expose her lies. Johnston decided to leave Hollyoaks in 2002 to become a midwife. Due to Laura's behaviour, Johnston described her as "one of the more outrageous characters" in the show.

== Casting ==
Actress Lesley Johnston took part in the first "Hollyoaks: On the Pull" campaign, which was set up by Hollyoaks' casting directors to find new young actors to appear in the show. She had no previous acting experience. Johnston discovered the casting call via a friend who was part of the same modelling agency as her. Johnston recalled that she and her friend only intended auditioning for fun. Johnston originally auditioned at Waterfront Hall in Belfast and was one of five thousand auditionees in attendance. Johnston drank too much alcohol the night before her audition and was hungover during the process. She met the show's casting director, Dorothy Andrew and was given a minute to describe herself. Andrew put Johnston through to the next stage of the audition by reading from scripts. Johnston waited the entire day and was informed she had been successful and was invited further auditions in Liverpool, where she was offered the role. The other three successful applicants chosen were Marcus Patric, Andrew Somerville and Elize du Toit. The show's executive producer Phil Redmond said that the decision to cast only four actors out of forty thousand auditionees showed how "scarce talent" was in the industry. Johnston had around three months in which to prepare for filming her first scenes as Laura. Johnston's casting was publicised in July 2000.

== Development ==
Writers included details of Laura's backstory in her scenes. It is revealed that Laura grew up in a children's home following the death of her mother. Laura moves to Hollyoaks village to study at the college. In her scenes, Laura is shown on-screen doing outlandish things such as stealing and having no guilty conscience afterwards. Laura also had psychotic tendencies, of which Johnston theorized: "I think she's been alone for a lot of her life and she's scared of that. I play it as if there's a mental disorder there because I had studied psychology." Johnston found it difficult to describe Laura because she enjoyed writers surprising her with new information about Laura's persona each time she received new scripts. In the book, Phil Redmond's Hollyoaks: The Official Companion, author Matthew Evans described Laura as "without a doubt one of the most elusive, enigmatic and odd characters ever seen in the show." Laura became known for her scheming and manipulative behaviour. Johnston was happy to portray such a personality and told Steven Moore from Sunday World that "I love being the cow of Hollyoaks, ut's great fun playing the baddie, I'm in stitches every week reading my lines."

Writers created a relationship storyline between Laura and Luke Morgan (Gary Lucy), who has recently split with Laura's best friend Mandy Richardson (Sarah Jayne Dunn). Luke discovers that Mandy is dating his own best friend, Ben Davies (Marcus Patric) and is hurt by their deception. Luke had been raped one year prior by Mark Gibbs (Colin Parry) and feels betrayed by Ben and Mandy, who helped him through the ordeal. Luke decides to move on and have fun with Laura and Lucy was happy that his character could have fun. Lucy did not believe Laura was the correct choice for Luke to get involved with because of her personality. He told Susan Riley from Soaplife that "the next few months should be interesting. Laura's got a mysterious background and I reckon Luke's relationship with her will bring some good twists." In another storyline, Laura ruins Mandy and Ben's relationship. Mandy and Ben plan a fashion show to promote their internet business. Laura volunteers to model at the show but a journalist tells her that a kiss on the catwalk would maximise publicity. Laura decides to kiss Ben on the catwalk and he kisses her back. Patric told Wendy Granditer from Inside Soap "it comes completely out of the blue for Ben, but he goes along with it because he thinks it's part of the show." He added that Ben breaks up with Mandy because she refuses to forgive him.

Laura's most notable storyline was her obsession with her best friend, Mandy. The story included a sensationalised scene in which Laura kisses Mandy. A Hollyoaks publicist told a reporter from Sunday Life that "Laura becomes more and more obsessed with Mandy. The kiss only increased her fascination and future episodes should keep viewers glued to their seats." Laura schemes to get closer to Mandy. She concocts a lie to hustle the Cunningham family into letting her move in. Johnston told an Inside Soap reporter that her character is always after "tea and sympathy". Whenever it appears that Mandy will discover Laura's lies, she pretends to be upset and emotionally manipulates Mandy. When Mandy discovers Laura lied about visiting her sick mother, she creates a new lie claiming her mother had died. Mandy tries to support Laura, who creates her next lie. She tells her landlord, Tony Hutchinson (Nick Pickard) that she is moving out. She then tells Mandy that Tony has evicted her and Mandy is allows Laura to move in with her family. Johnston stated that Laura's latest lies were becoming too difficult to maintain. She added "she's weaving such a web for herself, you wonder how long it will be before people start to realise what has been going on." Johnston believed that Laura's need to integrate herself within the Cunningham family comes from her own upbringing. Laura did not have any "positive influences in her life so far". She sees that despite Mandy's many dramas, she has a supportive family helping her overcome her turmoil. Laura recognises this and wants to be a part of it. Johnston concluded that Laura's manipulation of Mandy was an exciting storyline. Each time she came to work she wondered what Laura might do to Mandy next.

In August 2002, Johnston revealed that she was contracted to Hollyoaks until the end of the year. She stated that if producers offered her a new contract, she would stay. In September 2002, Johnston claimed she was not leaving Hollyoaks. Though, she spoke of Laura exiting the programme. She revealed that Laura is "one of the more outrageous characters" and would therefore need a "big" exit story from the show. Later that year, Johnston quit Hollyoaks to pursue her ambition of becoming a midwife. Johnston was considering signing a new one-year contract with Hollyoaks despite wanting to become a midwife. Johnston was in a relationship with Joe Crawford, a graphics designer working at Mersey Television who produced Hollyoaks. He helped her to decide to follow her dreams of becoming a midwife and quitting acting. Of her departure, Johnston told Sinead McCavana from Sunday Life that "now, having made the decision, nothing will get in my way." Johnston wanted Laura to leave the show with "something really nasty" happening to her so she could not return again.

In the episodes prior to Laura's departure, producers introduced her brother, Brendan Shepard (Michael Byers) into the series. His arrival threatens to expose Laura's past and she begins to concoct plans to prevent Mandy from discovering the truth. Laura tells everyone that Brendan is a stalker and is obsessed with her because she looks like his sister. Zeena Moolla from Inside Soap that "she tries to get rid of him by saying she has a new life now, because she knows that his presence could jeopardise everything." When Brendan has a chance conversation with Laura's friend Becca Hayton (Ali Bastian), she becomes suspicious of Laura because she never mentioned her brother. Laura manages to fool Becca and she believes Laura's lies about Brendan stalking her. Max Cunningham (Matt Littler) is not fooled by Laura's lies. He witnesses Laura and Brendan having an argument and realises Laura is trying to hide something. Laura is "unnerved" by Max's accusations but worries more about preserving her friendship with Mandy. Johnston explained that "Laura sees Mandy as having everything she wants. She really likes herand knowing Brendan might ruin everything, she suggests to Mandy that they move their business abroad."

Mandy is hesitant about Laura's plan to move and Laura observes this. Johnston revealed that Laura becomes desperate to keep control of Mandy. She buys one-way tickets for them to travel to South Africa. Mandy is not happy with Laura's gesture and her behaviour becomes erratic and sinister. Johnston revealed that the story was the catalyst that bring about Laura's final scenes. She revealed that "I can say it's the climax of all the strange things Laura has been up to ever since she arrived in Hollyoaks!" She added that she was "glad" the story was concluding because she would have "exhausted" herself continuing to portray "Laura's devious looks". Johnston was happy she left the show and revealed that her contracts paid £100,000. She also bemoaned her former colleagues for having "egos the size of planets" and "moaning about the job".

== Storylines ==
Laura arrives in Tony's student house and fends off Tony’s advances. Laura struggles to finance her first year of college, reaching such desperate measures that she steals the cloakroom money from "The Loft", the local nightclub. She soon has a fit of conscience and owns up to what she had done.

Laura then becomes friends with Mandy, but then begins to develop an unhealthy obsession with Mandy’s life, which reaches its peak when she starts dating Luke. After the relationship fizzles out, Laura continues to drive a wedge between Mandy and Luke, and seems to enjoy the problems Mandy had when Mandy's brother Lewis Richardson (Ben Hull) commits suicide. After Mandy and her mother became estranged, Laura fills the gap and enjoyed being part of the Cunningham family.

As Laura continues to control Mandy, Laura's brother Brendan arrived in the village and starts calling her Kerry, but Laura refuses to recognise him. Laura wants to get away from Hollyoaks and decides to go Cape Town and take Mandy with her. However, when Mandy feels suspicious and rejects Laura, Laura reacts by hitting her on the head with a glass bottle. Laura continues to taunt Mandy and locks Mandy and herself in Mandy’s flat until Tony arrived with Becca, Max, Adam Morgan (David Brown), and Brendan to rescue Mandy and get some help for Laura. It is revealed that Laura’s real name is Kerry, and Laura is taken from her best friend’s name who had died at the age of 11. Kerry is still recovering from that, and since then, Kerry found Mandy as a replacement to Laura and had more feeling for Mandy than a friend and tried to keep Mandy to herself. Laura is then institutionalised.

== Reception ==
For her portrayal of Laura, Johnston was nominated for the "Villain of the Year" award at the 2002 British Soap Awards. She was nominated for the award again at the 2003 ceremony. Laura and Ben were nominated for the "Most Snog-alicious Scene" award at the 2002 All About Soap awards.

Television magazine What's on TV said that Laura became Hollyoaks' answer to Single White Female as her obsession "took hold". Inside Soap's Zeena Moolla branded the character a "loopy blonde" and claimed that "Laura Burns has always behaved as if she's one can short of a six pack." Another Inside Soap critic questioned what Laura was hiding and why she wanted to be a part of the Cunningham family. They branded her a "creepy teen" and "loony Laura". They hoped she would become a murder because they believed she had the potential to becomes the show's next "villain in the mould of Rob Hawthorne".

John McGurk from Sunday Life branded Laura a "scheming superbitch" who "hit headlines" after her "steamy lesbian kiss" with Mandy. Steven Moore (Sunday World) also branded her a "super bitch" who had been "stirring up trouble". He added that "the attractive blond has been winding people up in the show for the past two years with her scheming and conniving." A fellow Sunday World writer opined that Johnston "broke hundreds of hearts" when she quit the show. They revealed that Johnston was "inundated" with fan mail and she "went down so well with viewers". Another reporter from Sunday Life branded Laura a "soap superbitch", "nasty" and a "scheming character". She was also labelled a "superbitch" and "outrageous Laura" in another article printed in the publication. Merle Brown from Daily Record branded her "loony Laura", "loopy Laura", questioned why she was still in the show, adding "let her flip spectacularly very soon."
