= Zodiak Kids & Family Productions UK =

British television production company

- Formerly: The Foundation (1994–2016); Zodiak Kids Studio UK (2016–2021)
- Type: Subsidiary
- Industry: Television production
- Founded: 1994; 32 years ago
- Founder: Vanessa Hill; Ged Allen
- Headquarters: London, United Kingdom
- Key people: Gwen Hughes (CEO)
- Parent: RDF Media (2006–2010); Zodiak Media (2010–2011); Banijay Kids & Family (2011–present)
- Website: www.banijaykidsandfamily.com/companies/zodiak-kids-family-productions-uk/

Zodiak Kids & Family Productions UK (formerly The Foundation and Zodiak Kids Studio UK) is a British television production company that is a subsidiary of French production & distribution group Banijay Entertainment through its children's production division Banijay Kids & Family founded in 1994. It is led by Gwen Hughes as CEO.

== History ==
In August 2006, The Foundation TV Productions was acquired by British independent production and distribution company RDF Media Group in order for RDF to further expand their kids and family entertainment operation with The Foundation's founders Vanessa Hill and Ged Allen had continued to work The Foundation under RDF alongside RDF's family entertainment director Nigel Pickard who had joined the acquired company.

In February 2011 following Swedish/French production group Zodiak Media Group's acquisition of The Foundation TV Productions' British production parent RDF Media Group one year prior in 2010, The Foundation TV Productions' parent company Zodiak Media Group announced the establishment of their own children's television division named Zodiak Kids with The Foundation TV Productions was moved into the new division and became a subsidiary of the new Zodiak Kids division.

== Shows ==
Title	Year(s)	Network	Notes
Endurance UK	1998	Challenge TV	Only show produced by the company not to be a children's series
Brilliant Creatures	1998–2004	ITV (CITV)	
Timekeepers of the Milennium	1999	ITV (CITV)	
Petswap	2001	ITV (CITV)	
Finger Tips	2001–2004, 2008	ITV (CITV); CITV Channel	
The Basil Brush Show	2002–2007	CBBC	Co-production with Entertainment Rights
Globo Loco	2003–2004	ITV (CITV)	
Holly & Stephen's Saturday Showdown	2004–2006	ITV (CITV); CITV Channel	Co-production with Carlton Television/Granada London/ITV Productions; Known as Ministry of Mayhem in 2004 and MoM in 2005
Let's Roll with Roland Butter	2004	ITV (CITV)	
Tricky TV	2005–2006, 2010	ITV (CITV); CITV Channel	
Finders Keepers	2006	ITV (CITV); CITV Channel	
Scratch ‘n’ Sniff’s Den of Doom	2006-2007	ITV (CITV); CITV Channel	
Dani's House	2008–2012	CBBC	
Basil and Barney's Swap Shop	2008–2010	CBBC	Known as Basil's Swap Shop for its first two series
Basil and Barney's Game Show	2008–2010	CBBC	Condenced version of Basil and Barney's Swap Shop; Known as Basil's Game Show for its first two series
Big Barn Farm	2008–2010	CBeebies	
Mister Maker	2008–2009	CBeebies	Series 1 (2007) was produced by RDF Television
Escape from Scorpion Island	2008–2011	CBBC	Co-production with Freehand; Series 1 (2007) was produced by RDF Television
Waybuloo	2009–2012	CBeebies	Co-production with Decode Entertainment/DHX Media (Toronto)
Planet Ajay	2009–2010	CBBC	
Skillicious	2009-2010	CITV	
Mister Maker Comes to Town	2010	CBeebies	
Summer in Transylvania	2010-2012	Nickelodeon	
Postcode	2011	CBBC	
Fort Boyard: Ultimate Challenge	2011–2015	Disney XD; CITV	Co-production with Adventure Line Productions
Ultimate Sports Day	2012	CBBC	Produced as The Foundation Scotland
Tickety Toc	2012–2016	EBS; Nick Jr.	Co-production with FunnyFlux Entertainment
Let's Play	2013–2014	CBeebies	
Mister Maker Around the World	2013	CBeebies	
Dani's Castle	2013–2015	CBBC	Retitled Rich, Jimmy & Kait's Castle for its third series
Zack & Quack	2014–2017	Nick Jr.	Co-production with Candy Bear, QQD Limited and High1 Entertainment
Secret Life of Boys	2015–2021	CBBC	
Mister Maker's Arty Party	2015	CBeebies	
Scrambled!	2014–2021	CITV	
Millie Inbetween	2014–2018	CBBC	
The Lodge	2016–2017	Disney Channel	Owned by The Walt Disney Company EMEA
Joe All Alone	2018	CBBC	Miniseries
Flatmates	2019–2021	BBC iPlayer	Spinoff of Millie Inbetween
Mister Maker at Home	2020–2021	CBeebies	
Ted's Top Ten	2021–2022	CITV	
Silverpoint	2022–2023	CBBC; ZDF	Co-production with ZDF Studios
Mister Maker's Mumfie Makes	2023	YouTube	
