= List of The Basil Brush Show episodes =

This is a list of The Basil Brush Show episodes. The Basil Brush Show is a British television show that aired from 2002 to 2007.

== Series overview ==
Series	Episodes	Originally released	
Series	Episodes	First released	Last released
1	13	27 September 2002	20 December 2002
2	13	26 September 2003	19 December 2003
3	13	24 September 2004	17 December 2004
4	13	23 September 2005	16 December 2005
5	13	22 September 2006	15 December 2006
6	13	21 September 2007	14 December 2007

== Series 1 (2002) ==
No.	Title	Written by	Original release date
1	"The Date"	Dan Tetsell & Danny Robbins	27 September 2002
Basil and Stephen go on a double date from hell; Stephen with the gorgeous Amanda, leaving Basil with her aunt. Meanwhile, Anil attempts to turn his cafe into an up-market posh restaurant. Guest star: Bella Emberg as Aunt Mabel
2	"Mouse"	Ged Allen	4 October 2002
The Basil Brush gang fall victim to a hungry mouse, and they do whatever they can to get rid of it!
3	"The Stately Home"	Dan Tetsell & Danny Robbins	11 October 2002
When Basil finds out he's an Earl, he turns the flat into Brush Manor, and more than just tourists visit.
4	"The Bully"	Dan Tetsell & Danny Robbins	18 October 2002
Molly is depressed as she is being bullied by "Big Gladys", but who will stop the bully? Meanwhile, Anil is having a Mexican Theme Week at the cafe which attracts some unwanted attention. Guest Star: Sally Reeve as Big Gladys
5	"Cakes"	Ged Allen	25 October 2002
Stephen is feeling depressed, so the gang try to come up with a plan so he can entertain some people at Anil's Cafe.
6	"The Fake's Progress"	Matt King	1 November 2002
Steven meets a gypsy and wishes to be handsome, but learns to be careful what you wish for, when every girl he meets begins slobbering over him.
7	"The Job"	Ged Allen	8 November 2002
Molly sends Basil and Stephen to find a job and why does Molly have a giant stone? And where is the TV?
8	"Mean Genie"	Matt King	15 November 2002
While spring cleaning, the gang (Molly, Basil, Steven and Dave) find a magic kettle. Basil rubs it and out comes a 'huge blue man' (called a Meanie) who requests three wishes. Now Basil has to grant the Meanie the three wishes or else the Meanie will stay in the flat for 'all eternity'. The problem now is simple. To get rid of him. Finally they finish the 3 tasks and find out about his past. He finally leaves by getting the kettle stolen.
9	"The Farm"	Dan Tetsell & Danny Robbins	22 November 2002
There is a new tenant upstairs. It seems a farmer, has moved in. He has a beautiful daughter that Steven fancies. Of course Basil has to watch out for 2 reasons (1, he hates foxes and 2 he's on the look out for whoever stole his animals.)
10	"The Mad Man From Murrumbidgee"	Matt King	29 November 2002
Basil and the gang are watching a show about the popular animal poker, Trev Dunfermeline. Dave wins a contest, the prize being able to go to Australia and meet Trev, much to Steven's anger due to the fact that he has an audition with popular film director Marty Scorberg.
11	"Going For Broke"	David Gillespie & Mark Warren	6 December 2002
Dave is rewarded when he shows kindness to a tramp but really is going on? And what is Dave hiding? Guest Star: Max Moran as The Nasty School Boy Special Guest Star: Peter Sissons as the newsreader
12	"Molly Christmas"	Sandi Toksvig	13 December 2002
It's mid-summer and the repressive heat has put everyone, especially Molly, in a bad mood. When Father Christmas moves in upstairs, Basil thinks he's found the perfect solution to the frayed tempers and sweltering heat in the shape of a red suit and a cool yule. (This episode is the series 1 Christmas episode)
13	"Cousin Mortimer"	Ged Allen	20 December 2002
Everything is going well for Basil & Co until his Cousin "Mortimer" turns up, claiming to be homeless and terminally ill. Stephen, Molly and Dave feel sorry for Mortimer and take him in. But Basil knows Mortimer's true colours, and tries to prove it to his friends. Can Basil convince his friends that Mortimer is evil before it's too late? (This episode is the series finale.) Guest Stars: Don Austen as Mortimer

== Series 2 (2003) ==
No.	Title	Original release date
1	"Ella"	12 September 2003
The flat across the hall is up for rent and Basil is keen to impress his new neighbour the foxy Miss Ella! But chaos ensues, as the landlord tries to keep trouble at bay and Basil out of the way while he tries to let the flat! First Appearance: Tisha Martin as Ella
2	"Surprise Party"	19 September 2003
It appears that everyone has forgotten Stephen's birthday, so he throws his own.
3	"Fit For Nothing"	26 September 2003
Ella and Molly try to convince Basil and Stephen to stop eating junk food and get fit at "Healthy Harry's Healthy World Gymnasium". Once there Harry tricks them into signing a contract to be on his embarrassing TV fitness show. Can Basil and Stephen get out of it? Also, Basil and Stephen do not want to catch the bug that is going around. Guest Star: Jeff Harding as Harry
4	"Molly In Love"	3 October 2003
Molly experiences the ups and downs of being in love for the first time. But will Molly's choice in boys meet with the overly protective Uncle Stephen's approval? Guest Stars: Basil Soper, Sean Baker, Joseph Williams, Junior James and Max Moran
5	"Big Bother"	10 October 2003
The flat plays host to a reality TV show. But which of the housemates will win the cash prize? Note: Ella is absent in this episode
6	"Bend It Like Basil"	17 October 2003
Dave is forced by his P.E teacher to play in a match against "St Nigel's" – the toughest and meanest school in the world! Guest Star: Bradley Walsh as Mr Savage
7	"Bing Trouble"	24 October 2003
Basil is writing a family chronicle when he receives a parcel from Ella. She claims the box is alive but inside was Basil's nephew Bingo! Bingo causes trouble for the gang such as: eats Ella's dress, eats Molly's French homework, throws up on Dave's schoolbag, uses the toilet and eats the rabbit out of Stephen's top hat and finally, he wrecks Anil's cafè for £2.32.
8	"Soap A Dope"	31 October 2003
Stephen gets a role in a TV soap that catapults him straight to stardom – TV interviews, guest appearances and even a magazine spread all follow. But fame proves something of a rollercoaster ride for Stephen! Guest Stars: James Seager, Maria Charles, Robert Cameron
9	"The Return of Cousin Mortimer"	7 November 2003
Basil's villainous Cousin Mortimer is back after being released from prison, finding employment in Anil's Cafe. Has Mortimer turned over a new leaf, or is he up to his old tricks?
10	"Taste The Blood Of Brushcula"	14 November 2003
Basil and Dave's plan to watch a horror film extravaganza on TV but Stephen does not like horror films. Meanwhile Basil gets delivered some cheese from his old friend who runs the smelliest cheese farm in Somerset. Whilst watching the horror films Basil wants his cheese but the smell puts everyone off the films and they go to bed. Basil ends up eating all the cheese and falling asleep. Basil has a nightmare about everyone in the house transforming into blood-thirsty vampires. He admits that eating cheese before bed was a bad idea. Guest Stars: Ross Burden as Himself and Eamonn Holmes as Himself
11	"Project Anil"	21 November 2003
Anil becomes depressed because his cafè isn't doing well because a new rival restaurant had opened down the road. Trying to help, Basil takes Anil to a cookery lesson taught by Ainsley Harriott but the lesson does not have any effect on Anil's cooking and the owner of the new restaurant (Orso) buys the café for £50 and the health inspector closes the cafe down so Anil has his cafè back. Guest Star: Howard Gossington as Orso Guest Star: Ainsley Harriott as Himself
12	"Quiz Night"	28 November 2003
It is the quiz night at the cafe. Basil and Stephen are going to need more than their brain cells if they hope to beat Ella to the prize. An epic battle of the sexes ensues as the Girls take on the boys. Will Basil and Stephen keep the crown? Guest Star Michael Jenn, and Dougal Irvine
13	"Basil's Christmas Turkey"	5 December 2003
It is Christmas and Basil wants a perfect Christmas show with all the trimmings, but things do not go to plan when Stephen's Aunt Mortimer and Bingo turn up and not one of the people who Basil told Dave to invite. (This episode is the series finale and Christmas Episode); Guest Stars: Don Austin as Mortimer and Bingo and Tisha Martin as Ella Final appearance of Ella

== Series 3 (2004) ==
No.	Title	Original release date
1	"Frocks Rocks"	24 September 2004
Madison, an American fashion student, has moved in upstairs so Steven offers to help her move in. This results in Basil throwing away all of her collection. Now Basil, Molly, Dave and Steven must help her make a brand new collection on a tight budget.
2	"The Revenge Of The Mummy"	1 October 2004
Molly’s homework on the Ancient Egyptians leads to the discovery of a burial chamber under the flat. Basil and the gang are keen to raid the tomb and get their hands on the famous jewel that once belonged to King Tutenbek. But are they wise to ignore the jewel’s curse? Absent: Ajay Chhabra as Anil and India Beau as India
3	"The Pitz Hotel"	8 October 2004
Dave’s latest moneymaking scheme turns the flat into a hotel. The gang are roped in to help but Basil and Stephen are determined to ruin the project. But by making the hotel the worst hotel in the world it becomes a success. Are the guests going to stay forever? Guest Star: Don Austen as Bingo Guest Star: Mr Rossiter
4	"Holding The Baby"	15 October 2004
Molly has taken on a babysitting job. However, when Molly is called away by the paranoid parents she leaves Basil and Stephen to cope with an increasingly flatulent baby boy, who goes through more nappies than either Basil or Stephen can handle. Absent: India Beau as India
5	"Wedded Blitz"	22 October 2004
Basil awakes to discover he’s lined up to marry popular soap star, Kelly Foxwell. As Kelly charms her way into Basil’s affections, the gang are subjected to a few changes around the flat. Stephen suspects Kelly’s intentions are not honourable and when Mortimer turns up Basil is in for a surprise. Guest Star: Don Austen as Cousin Mortimer
6	"Pop Fox"	29 October 2004
As owner of a new karaoke machine, Anil has been chosen to host the latest heats of TV’s pop talent show "Pop War". Basil and Stephen decide to enter but as rivals. Stephen’s nerves increase on discovering Basil’s surprisingly brilliant singing abilities so, with Dave’s assistance, resorts to cheating to try to win. However, in spite of all their efforts they are both outperformed by a surprise talent.
7	"Sports Spectacular"	5 November 2004
Molly is involved with Sports day but the coach's daughter is always cheating. Basil & Co. get Molly in training to win.
8	"Basil's Millions"	12 November 2004
Basil and Mortimer are set to inherit $42 gazillion. The catch - they must get along without any fighting for 48 hours.
9	"Camping"	19 November 2004
Basil and Steven are dared to spend a night camping with Molly, Dave and Madison. Anil takes advantage of them gone and spends the night in Steven's flat. Guest Star: Don Austen as Bingo
10	"The Candidate"	26 November 2004
Molly and Dave are both running for School President, but they have completely different ideas. Basil, Madison and India help Molly, meanwhile Anil and Steven help Dave.
11	"Foxweight Champion"	3 December 2004
Wrestling mania has taken over in the Basil household so when their favourite wrestler, the Stone, steps out of the ring into retirement they are all distraught. Dave sets up Anil’s café as the venue for a new wrestling show. Basil becomes champion tempting the Stone out of retirement. It looks like the end for the gang when the Stone enters the ring but fortunately a mystery champ saves the day. (This Episode Is A Spoof of World Wrestling Entertainment) Guest Star: Don Austen as Bingo
12	"Dog gone"	10 December 2004
Dave’s pet sitting scheme enrages the landlord who issues an ultimatum to remove all the animals from the flat or else. With Basil and the gang’s help the flat is cleared apart from one stray dog whose owner can’t be located. Coincidentally the landlord has lost his little dog … Guest Star: Mr Rossiter
13	"It's a Wonderful Brush"	17 December 2004
Basil and the gang are in tragedy as they have only 79p for Christmas. Basil blame himself for this and wishes he was never born. This episode is based on Frank Capra's It's A Wonderful Life. (This episode is the series 3 finale and christmas episode). Guest Star: Don Austen as Bingo/Cousin Mortimer

== Series 4 (2005) ==
No.	Title	Original release date
1	"Fox in Space"	23 September 2005
Dave is setting up cheap flights into space and persuades Basil and Stephen to test pilot the spaceship. It all goes well until an alien spaceship appears on the scene. However Basil, as ever, has the last laugh.
2	"Thanks A Million"	30 September 2005
Madison's Aunt Maddie arrives from America and is deposited in the flat with Basil and the gang who are keen to get rid of her, but when she ends up winning a million pounds on the lottery their feelings change as they offer to help her spend the money. However it is Madison and Molly who come up with the best way of getting rid of a million! Absent: India Beau as India
3	"Manic Organic"	7 October 2005
Madison and Molly help Basil opt for a healthier lifestyle by changing his diet and growing veggies in the back garden. Anil, feeling threatened by the popularity of the organic produce, tries to sabotage the operation using toxic waste provided by Cousin Mortimer. However, the waste give such amazing results that soon Basil wholefoods are in the shops. Unfortunately there is a side effect. Guest Star: Don Austen as Cousin Mortimer Absent: India Beau as India
4	"Basil's Angels"	14 October 2005
First the money from the till, and then the till itself go missing from Anil's café. Basil is determined to find the thief using every cop show parody – this includes the girls (Molly, Madison and India) dressing up 'Charlie's Angels' style.
5	"Basil's Brush With Fame"	21 October 2005
Basil, Dave and Stephen set up as a boy band. In spite of being terrible, a record producer signs them up and immediately dubs their voices and re-works their style. Eventually Dave and Stephen leave, are replaced, leaving Basil as the only original band member. They may be successful, but is Basil willing to mime? Guest star: Robert Kazinsky as Sven
6	"The Stupid Christmas, I Mean Halloween Episode"	28 October 2005
When Basil and the gang decide to make a scary Halloween home movie they get more than they bargained for with the appearance of a poltergeist!
7	"I'm A Celebrity... Let Me Back In The Kitchen"	4 November 2005
Dave decides to jump on the reality TV bandwagon and, with the help of Molly and Madison, turns the garden into a jungle. Basil, Stephen and some B list celebs are thrown together to see who can survive. But lack of food makes all the celebs do strange things... Guest Star: Sally Reeve as Hassiba Worthington
8	"Double Trouble (Part 1)"	11 November 2005
Dave's science homework results in Mr Stephen being cloned. Basil and the gang feel the new Stephen is of a slightly higher pedigree than the original! Absent: India Beau as India and Laura Evans as Madison Guest Star: Don Austen as Cousin Mortimer
9	"Double Trouble (Part 2)"	18 November 2005
The Episode starts with Basil, Molly and Dave in jail (having been arrested at the end of the previous episode), where they are soon joined by Mortimer. After finding the real Steven, they break into the lab and save the clone. But Basil mucks up trying to get rid of Steven's clone and instead makes copies of everyone (Himself, Molly, Dave and Bingo). Eventually the original gang are fired and replaced by the clones. They go to work at Anil's and get paid 25 pence between them. Basil has an idea to let the clones age, as they age much faster than the originals. It works and the original gang get their jobs back.
10	"Basil: The Movie"	25 November 2005
Dave's latest money making scheme is in the movie business. When Madison's uncle, a well known Hollywood director comes to town, production soon starts on Basil: The Movie. But Basil doesn't quite get the recognition he hopes for.
11	"The Incapables"	2 December 2005
There seems to be a bit of a crimewave sweeping the neighbourhood and Basil and the gang decide to invent themselves as superheroes to clean up the town. However Anil also has some surprise powers when it comes to protecting his customers. Guest Star: Mr Rossiter
12	"Meeja Mogul"	9 December 2005
Dave decides to become every inch the successful meeja mogul only he takes it to extremes and is soon running a multi-million pound business. Basil and the gang start to worry about Dave's ridiculous lifestyle and besides, his schoolwork is starting to suffer. Absent: India Beau as India
13	"Santa Brush"	16 December 2005
After Santa gets food poisoning in Anil's, the gang feel obliged to do his job for him. But can they make and deliver enough presents all over the world in just one night? Even Cousin Mortimer is roped in to give them the benefit of his mathematical skills. (This episode is the series finale and the 2005 Christmas Episode.) Guest Star: Don Austen as Cousin Mortimer Note: Final appearances of the Voice-Over Man, India Beau as India, final regular appearance of Christopher Pizzy as Stephen

== Series 5 (2006) ==
No.	Title	Original release date
1	"Liam And Lucy"	22 September 2006
Stephen has left to go to Hollywood, so Basil, Madison and Dave audition for a new sidekick. Meanwhile Anil's niece, Lucy, has come to stay but Anil is treating her badly so Madison rescues her much to Basil's dismay. And Molly, dressed as a panda, is raising money to save whales. Guest Stars: Georgina Leonidas as Molly and Christopher Pizzey as Stephen
2	"Fox Rocks"	29 September 2006
Will Basil's performance be good enough for the rock festival?
3	"Toothache"	6 October 2006
Will Basil, Liam, Dave and Lucy's amateur dentistry put a stop to Anil's toothache? Will Molly stop them before they go too far? Guest Star: Georgina Leonidas as Molly
4	"Brush To The Future"	13 October 2006
Basil and Liam try their hand at time travel.
5	"Kiss And Tell"	20 October 2006
Basil's Arctic Fox girlfriend returns to see Basil, but will Basil be pleased or worried?
6	"Basil's Haunted House"	27 October 2006
Is a Halloween sleepover in the countries most haunted house really a good idea? Guest Star: Georgina Leonidas as Molly
7	"Basil Back To School"	3 November 2006
Molly, Liam and Lucy bet Basil that he can't survive if he went back to school, so he goes to school and gets in trouble with other pupils and the headteacher. Liam and Madison are sent to get him out of trouble, but how much could Basil cause? At school he gets Molly, Dave, Lucy and Bingo all into trouble as well. Guest Star: Georgina Leonidas as Molly
8	"Basil The Casualty"	10 November 2006
Basil's illness lands him in hospital where his treatment holds a few surprises.
9	"Dave's First Girlfriend"	17 November 2006
It's all hands on deck as Basil and the gang try to impress Dave's new girlfriend. Will the path of true love run smoothly? Guest Star: Sydney White as Billy Jo
10	"The Sweet Smell Of Success"	24 November 2006
Will Basil or Roxy win fox of the year? But is there someone else waiting in the wings? Guest Star: Georgina Leonidas as Molly
11	"It's A Knockout"	1 December 2006
Basil's knock on the head turns out to be a headache for the rest of the gang. As Basil suffers from amnesia and has forgotten his famous catchphrase... Guest Star: Georgina Leonidas as Molly
12	"Basil's Extravaganza"	8 December 2006
Basil and Liam realise that staging the end-of-school extravaganza won't be easy. Guest Star: Georgina Leonidas as Molly
13	"There's No Business Like Snow Business"	15 December 2006
Will Basil and the gang get the snowy Christmas they are looking forward to? This is the Series 5 Christmas episode and series finale. Guest Star: Georgina Leonidas as Molly and Don Austen as Cousin Mortimer and Bingo

== Series 6 (2007) ==
No.	Title	Original release date
1	"Ballroom Basil"	21 September 2007
Basil gets ballroom fever, but how can he cha cha cha without a partner? Guest Star: Georgina Leonidas as Molly and Camilla Dallerup as Donna
2	"Basil's Angels 2: Fox on the Run"	28 September 2007
Will Basil's trusty Angels prove he didn't steal a ruby before the police lock him away? Liam and Lucy replace become Angels in the places of India (who is on a slow-boat to China) and Molly (who has gone to get some milk).
3	"The Charming Man"	5 October 2007
Liam's old Uncle Brendan has found the secret of eternal youth, and Basil wants a bottle!
4	"The Lift"	12 October 2007
Will Basil save the day when Madison is trapped in a lift?
5	"Dave Swap"	19 October 2007
A new Dave moves into the flat and creates mayhem. Basil plots to bring the old Dave home.
6	"Anil The Sidekick"	26 October 2007
Anil and Liam swap places, meaning Liam is the owner of Anil's Cafe and Anil is Basil's new sidekick.
7	"Da Basil Code"	2 November 2007
Basil and the gang are on the trail of an ancient artefact that grants wishes. But when the wishing gets out-of-hand, there are consequences.
8	"All Scream For Ice-Cream"	9 November 2007
It is Hallowe'en but a freaky hot spell means everyone wants ice cream. However the mysterious Ice Cream Reaper is causing much trouble for the team.
9	"Windbreaker"	16 November 2007
Basil becomes a secret agent for the British Secret Serive(Codename: Windbreaker)and along with the rest of the gang: Madison: Supergirl (U.S.A), Liam: Captain Green (Ireland), Lucy: The Doll (Russia) and Anil: Mighty Lion/Flaming Idiot by Basil (China), to spy on Cousin Mortimer, but who is the real villain?
10	"Dave's Apprentice"	23 November 2007
Dave is to retire. Will Basil defeat the opposition and inherit Dave's business empire?
11	"That Shrinking Feeling"	30 November 2007
Dave accidentally shrinks to the size of a microdot and is eaten by Anil. Basil shrinks himself down to rescue his old friend from the bubbling stomach acid.
12	"Basil Hood"	7 December 2007
During the filming of a Robin Hood B-movie, Bingo thinks it's all real. Can Basil stop his nephew Bingo from becoming a small, furry outlaw like it's 1973?
13	"Basil's Christmas Dinners"	14 December 2007
Basil and Liam accept invitations to three Christmas dinners, but will they finish pudding before they explode? This is the series finale and Christmas episode for 2007. Guest Star: Georgina Leonidas as Molly

- Georgina Leonidas was present for two episodes due to filming of the then new Harry Potter film.
