= Let's Roll with Roland Butter =

- Created by: Peter Cocks
- Starring: Peter Cocks (Roland Butter), Karl Sedgwick (Keef)
- Country of origin: United Kingdom
- No. of series: 1

Production
- Running time: 15 minutes
- Production company: The Foundation

Original release
- Network: ITV (CITV)
- Release: July 2004

Let's Roll with Roland Butter is a children's TV series that aired on CITV in 2004. The show was made for only one series. The first episode was broadcast in July 2004, and as of 2021, hasn't had any reruns.

== Premise ==
The show starred Peter Cocks as Roland Butter, a tubby teenager who is obsessed with sport. Each week, Roland tried out various different activities, such as football, rugby, and skateboarding. Naturally, none of these go according to plan. The episodes were supposedly filmed by Roland's best friend, Keef (played by Karl Sedgwick).

== Peter Cocks ==
The show was created and written by Peter Cocks. Cocks had previously worked on several CITV shows, including Holly & Stephen's Saturday Showdown and The Basil Brush Show.
