= The Basil Brush Show =

British children's TV series

- Genre: Children's sitcom
- Written by: Ged Allen; Danny Robins
- Directed by: David McKay
- Starring: Michael Byers; Christopher Pizzey; Michael Hayes; Georgina Leonidas; Laura Evans; Tisha Martin; Ajay Chhabra
- Voices of: Michael Winsor (uncredited); Don Austen; Basil Soper
- Country of origin: United Kingdom
- Original language: English
- No. of series: 6
- No. of episodes: 78 (list of episodes)

Production
- Running time: 24 minutes
- Production companies: The Foundation; Entertainment Rights

Original release
- Network: CBBC
- Release: 27 September 2002 – 25 December 2007

Related
- The Basil Brush Show (1968–1980); Basil and Barney's Swap Shop

The Basil Brush Show is a British children's television sitcom series, starring the glove puppet fox Basil Brush. It was produced for six series by The Foundation, airing on CBBC from 27 September 2002 to 25 December 2007. The show is a spin-off from the original 1960s–1970s BBC television series, but without any of the original cast.

== Overview ==
The series is set in a colourful modern penthouse flat, which is jointly owned by Basil and his sidekick, Stephen (Christopher Pizzey). Living with them are Stephen's niece and nephew, Molly (Georgina Leonidas), and Dave (Michael Hayes). They are left under the care of Stephen so that Molly & Dave's parents can go on a round the world trip.

Other characters include Anil (Ajay Chhabra), the owner of a greasy-spoon café under the name of 'Anil's', where the main characters would frequently be seen dining. Ella (Tisha Martin) is Basil and Stephen's neighbour who loves to sing. She is later replaced by Madison (Laura Evans), an American fashion designer. In Series 1, Laurie Ventry appeared in 12 out of the 13 episodes, playing a different character every time.

Notably, the series takes a laissez-faire attitude towards the show's atmosphere, and the fourth wall is frequently broken; characters often reference the fact that they are on a studio set, and several episodes feature scenes and segments where the show's cameramen and crew become involved in the storyline.

As the show was re-vamped in later years, two other characters were introduced. Liam (Michael Byers) replaces Stephen as Basil's new sidekick, with Lucy (Janine Vieira - Series 5 & Madeline Castrey - Series 6) debuting as Anil's niece.

== Key characters ==
=== Basil Brush ===
Basil Brush is a red fox, rendered as both a glove puppet and an animated character. He usually wears a green jacket and a red cravat, and speaks in a posh manner, using Received Pronunciation and addressing people as "Mister", "Master" or "Miss". His catchphrase is "Boom! Boom!", usually exclaimed after bursting out laughing at one of his own jokes. He is voiced by Michael Winsor, who is credited as "Basil's Personal Assistant".

=== Stephen ===
Stephen (usually referred to by Basil as "Mr Stephen") is the uncle to Dave and Molly, and is left in charge of them when their parents go on a round-the-world tour. He was on the show from 2002 to 2006. He is often the main subject of Basil's or another character's jokes, much to his annoyance. He was also not very clever as he did not seem to know a very simple sum (as established in the episode "Bing Trouble", when Molly told him that 2 + 2 = 4 to which he said "Does it?"). He was played by Christopher Pizzey and left at the end of series 4. He appeared briefly in series 5 when Basil mentioned that he has been snapped up by Hollywood. But this later reveals he is working at a Hollywood burger van. His cousin Liam arrives shortly after to take his place.

=== Liam ===
Liam is played by Michael Byers and is a distant cousin of Stephen's, replacing him as Basil's sidekick in the fifth series of the show, appearing from 2006 to 2007. Liam is trying to come to terms with the exciting things which are yet to happen to him in life. He can appear slightly dumb in some aspects, but is actually quite smart. Several episodes revolve around some of his near-impossible inventions (like a time machine and a shrink ray) and he is also good at chemistry. A recurring joke is that he will mention some odd night class he has been to, with the line, "I knew those (-whatever is relevant to the story-) night classes would come in handy." In the episode Ballroom Basil, it is stated that his surname is O'Dingleberry.

=== Dave ===
Dave is a child character who is 10 years old in Series 1, growing to be 15 in Series 6. He is regularly shown to have a flair for business and has, throughout the course of the series, set up a media empire which was later destroyed by Basil and Stephen in the episode Meeja Mogul, imported stolen goods and even started his own television show. He is usually addressed as a 14-year-old multi-billionaire entrepreneur and is played by Michael Hayes.

=== Molly ===
Molly is Dave's older sister and Stephen's niece. She is 12 years old in series 1 and 17 in series 6. She is portrayed as the sensible character, trying to reason with the characters whenever they make a bad decision and can sometimes be very violent. Molly is one of the most popular characters on the show. She is very clever and very witty. From Series 5, Molly appears in only a few episodes as a recurring character, with Lucy partially replacing her character-type. Molly only appears in two episodes in the final season, in Ballroom Basil where she says she is going to get some milk and she may be gone for some time, and in Basil Christmas Dinners where she returns and explains there was a worldwide milk shortage and she had to go all the way to Timbuktu which is why she was so long. She is portrayed by Georgina Leonidas.

=== Madison ===
An American who was introduced as 'Madison Square-Gardens', Madison is a fashion student living in the flat upstairs. She was on the show from 2004 to 2007. The character of Madison is played by Laura Evans, a singer/songwriter from Aberdare in South Wales. Her initial designs were thrown out by Basil, having mistaken them for rubbish. Madison is Stephen's third love interest in the show. She pronounces Basil's name in the southern US way, as Bay-zull. When things start going wrong, she often protests that the only reason she is still in the UK is because she has lost her passport. Her name comes from Madison Square Garden.

=== Anil ===
Appearing in every series of the show, Anil is the owner of Basil's local hangout, Anil's Caff. Like Mr Stephen, he is shown to have a less than average intelligence, and a running joke through the series is the terrible quality of his food. It is revealed that he is sexist in Bend it like Basil. He is played by Ajay Chhabra. In the episode Camping it is revealed that Anil wears a wig, has a glass eye, false teeth and a prosthetic wooden leg. His false teeth was seen again in "Toothache" much to the "dentists" shock.

=== Lucy ===
Lucy is Anil's niece and currently lives in Basil's flat. Lucy was Anil's "slave" but was "rescued" by Madison. She can be quite stubborn at times but loves hanging out in the flat with Basil and the rest of the gang. She hates cousin Mortimer's pranks and Dave's cons. Lucy replaces Molly after she left the show after series 4, and aired on the show from 2006 to 2007. The character of Lucy is played by Janine Vieira in Season 5 and Madeline Castrey in Season 6.

=== Ella ===
Ella is Stephen's second love interest, only appearing in the second series (2003). She is also good friends with Molly. It is revealed that she is a football prodigy in Bend it like Basil. She is played by Tisha Martin.

== Semi-regular and recurring characters ==
=== The Voice-over Man ===
The Voice Over Man was an unseen character who often voiced over at times when he annoys the gang but occasionally he undid some mistakes that Basil and his friends made. He was part of the regular cast from 2002 to 2005, quietly retiring from the show after Series 4. He was credited as Basil Soper.

=== Mortimer Brush ===
Mortimer is Basil's cousin. A recurring antagonist in the series, he is a career criminal, and usually wears a black leather jacket. Basil describes Mortimer as having been to prison so many times that his prison cell has a revolving door.

In the first series finale, he arrived and pretended to be kind and helpful to the local people but secretly he was stealing things and getting Basil into trouble. In the second series, he was released from prison and he was still causing havoc. His catchphrase is "Bang! Bang!", which he uses after bursting out laughing at his own jokes, and which is often followed by the sound of two projectile ricochets.

In the third series he and Basil had to get along for 24 hours without fighting and arguing but they over-wound the wind-up clock and they fought one minute too early . He also appeared at Basil's wedding when he was marrying evil Kelly Foxwell but in the end, Kelly liked Mortimer more than Basil; it is revealed that Basil had, in fact, intended for this to happen, and had asked for Mortimer to be best man specifically so that Kelly would fall in love with him, allowing Basil to get out of marrying her. He returned in the Christmas special. He appeared in the fourth series in prison. He is voiced by Don Austen.

He appeared in the 2005 and 2006 Christmas specials.

In the first series finale, his full name is revealed to be Mortimer Trouble Brush.

=== Bingo Brush ===
Basil's playful and hyperactive nephew fox cub. His catchphrase is "Bing bing!". Bingo has a twin brother called Bungo whom Basil says is "much, much worse", who only appeared at the end of Bingo's first story. Bingo appeared on the show multiple occasions, starting from 2003. Bingo is voiced by Don Austen.

=== Maximilian Brushefeller ===
Maximilian Brushefeller is Basil's deceased uncle, who lived in America. In the episode "Basil's Millions", it is revealed that, prior to his death, he left "42 gazillion dollars" to Basil and Mortimer, to be split between them equally, on the condition that they get along with each other for 24 hours. Unfortunately, the Brush family clock, which was used to keep track of the time, was overwound, causing it to be fast. As a result, Basil and Mortimer begin fighting too early, and the inheritance is voided, resulting in both of them inheriting nothing. However, it is revealed that all of the money was, in fact, fake, and that Maximilian was totally penniless at the time of his death. Maximilian's catchphrase was "Bank, bank!".

=== Roxy ===
Roxy is Basil's girlfriend, but unlike the other foxes in the show she is an Arctic fox. She has only been seen in four episodes of the fifth series (2006), including the 2006 Christmas Special. She pronounces Basil's name as Ba-Zeal. She is voiced by Sheila Clark.

=== Mr Rossiter ===
Mr Rossiter is the landlord who own the flats the main characters live in. He is named after Leonard Rossiter, who famously played the landlord Rupert Rigsby in the sitcom Rising Damp. He is played by Milton Johns.

=== India ===
India is a waitress who works at Anil's Cafe (Basil's local hangout). She is a terrible cook like her boss but has a beautiful singing voice, as shown to perform songs occasionally throughout the series. India was only mentioned for a brief portion of the final season (2007). She is played by India de Beaufort.

=== Amanda ===
Amanda first appeared in the first episode in Season 1. She is a restaurant critic and Stephen's first love interest. In the series 1 finale, Amanda sides with Mortimer when he takes over the show and turning it into a seedy backdrop. She dresses up as a club harlot and breaks the fourth wall, claiming she "can't afford to be out of work". When Stephen orders her to "get those cloths off!", she indignantly leaves and is never seen again. She is played by Jodie Scott.

== Episodes ==
Series	Episodes	Originally released	
Series	Episodes	First released	Last released
1	13	27 September 2002	20 December 2002
2	13	26 September 2003	19 December 2003
3	13	24 September 2004	17 December 2004
4	13	23 September 2005	16 December 2005
5	13	22 September 2006	15 December 2006
6	13	21 September 2007	14 December 2007

== Locations ==
- Stephen's Flat (2002–07): This is the place where the gang live and spend most of their time. It is made up of a living room, kitchen, bathroom, and four bedrooms. The bathroom is seen on many occasions, and Basil and Stephen's bedroom is seen at the end of every episode from Series 1–4. Molly's room is only seen in one episode in Series One, and Dave's room is only seen in an episode from Series 4. There is also another bedroom behind a yellow door. Liam moves into the flat for Series 5 and 6.
- Anil's Café (2002–07): The gang spend most of their time here, although it apparently serves bad food (the reason for this is given by Basil, when asked by Anil once, as "it's the only other set we've got", to which Anil responds "good point"). This is the place where the group meets Amanda (1.1), India (Series 2 – 4), and Lucy (5.1). We also see Anil's Kitchen in one episode from Series 2. It is later refurbished in Series 5 in the episode toothache. In Series 6, it is seen again in the episode fox on the run.
- Ella's Flat (2003): Only featured twice in the 2003 series. The first appearance in "Ella" after Stephen and Basil end up falling through an air vent and a second time in "Molly in Love", when Molly visits and tells Ella about her crush. It is seen as mostly light brown and beige in colour.
- Madison's Flat (2004–07): This is the place where Madison lives. It is exceptionally smaller than both Ella's and Stephen's flat.
- The alley (2005–07): The first episode where this set was used was in "Basil's Angels".

== Spin-offs ==
=== Basil's Swap Shop/Basil's Game Show ===
Basil's Swap Shop (later known as Basil and Barney's Swap Shop in the third series) is a remake of the cult-classic children's Saturday morning show Multicoloured Swap Shop. The show was presented by Basil Brush and Barney Harwood and was produced for three series by The Foundation (the same production company that produced The Basil Brush Show) and aired live from 5 January 2008 to 25 September 2010 on BBC Two and CBBC. Basil's Game Show was the cut-down version of the show that featured just the games, as well as some of the comedy segments.

== Media releases ==
=== Region 2 DVDs ===
Right Entertainment and Universal Pictures Video released several DVD sets in the United Kingdom.

Region 2
DVD Title	Episode Count	Aspect Ratio	Total running time	Release Date
"Basil Brush: Unleashed" (VHS & DVD)	3	4:3	73 Minutes	6 October 2003
"Basil Brush: A Brush with Fame" (VHS & DVD)	4	4:3	Unknown	Cancelled
"Basil Brush – Sports Spectacular"	3	16:9	72 Minutes	25 July 2005
"Basil Brush – Extravaganza"	6	16:9	2 hours and 23 Minutes	17 March 2008
"Basil Brush – Crazy Christmas"	6	16:9	2 hours and 26 minutes	3 November 2008

=== Region 4 ===
A selection of episodes were released on DVD by ABC Video/Roadshow Entertainment and Universal Pictures Australia.

== Broadcast ==
In the United Kingdom, the show previously aired on CBBC.

The show aired on Boomerang in Brazil as O Show do Basil.

The show aired on Cartoon Network, La 2 in Spain, and Clan as El Show de Basil Brush.

The show aired on RTP2 in Portugal in English with Portuguese subtitles.

The show aired on RTÉ Two in Ireland.
