= Christopher Pizzey =

British actor and comedian

- Born: 23 December 1976 (age 49); London, England
- Other name: Chris Pizzey
- Education: Rose Bruford College
- Occupations: Actor, comedian
- Years active: 1998–present

Christopher Pizzey (born 23 December 1976) is an English actor and comedian from London. He is best known for playing Mr. Stephen in the CBBC series The Basil Brush Show (2002–2006).

== Early life ==
Pizzey was born and raised in London and graduated from the Rose Bruford College.

== Career ==
Pizzey's first notable appearance was as Keith in episode 11.9 of TV series London's Burning. His next appearance was as Busyboy in the Doc Martin TV series. He then appeared in the UK film Anomaly in 2005 as Captain Dale Waxman.

His most long-standing appearance was as Basil Brush's sidekick Mr Stephen in the 2002 remake of the classic Basil Brush show from 2002 to 2005. He appeared from series one to series four as one of the four main characters who all lived in the same flat. This show was regularly repeated on the Channel until the programme ceased to be aired in the late 2000s.

He has also appeared in the BBC soap EastEnders as the character of Andy in a 2006 episode and the Roman Mysteries episode of The Pirates of Pompeii (2007) as the character of Actius for one episode along with an appearance in the BBC daytime drama Doctors in May 2007 as well as appearing in a stage production of The Wind in the Willows at the West Yorkshire Playhouse, Leeds as Mole. In November 2008, Christopher appeared in an episode of The Bill playing Richard O'Leary, a man whose car was stolen. He also appeared as Sarah Jane's father, Eddie Smith, in Episodes 9 and 10 of The Sarah Jane Adventures.

Pizzey starred in the 2007 feature film The Shrine, directed by Duncan Catterall and co-starring Natasha Coulter and Greg Chapman.

He also stars in the Basil Brush co-star Ajay Chhabra's television show Planet Ajay, in which he plays one of the regulars, "Mr Killjoy".

== Personal life ==
Pizzey is of English and Italian heritage. He also has two daughters.

== Filmography ==
=== Film ===
Year	Title	Role	Notes
2005	Anomaly	Captain Dale Waxman	Short film
2006	What Are the Chances	Viktor	Short film
2007	The Shrine	Alex Greenway	
2007	Girl 23	Ben	Short film
2008	Soundproof	Ray	Short film
2009	Grip	Jamie	Also co-producer
2012	Blessing	Will	Short film
2014	Muppets Most Wanted	Russian Gulag Prisoner	Uncredited
2016	Monochrome	Armed Officer	
2020	The Postcard Killings	Charles Hardwick	

=== Television ===
Year	Title	Role	Notes
1999	London's Burning	Keith	Episode #11.9
2001	Doc Martin	Busboy	TV movie
2002–2006	The Basil Brush Show	Mr. Stephen	
2006	EastEnders	Andy	Episode dated 19 May 2006
2007	Doctors	Brian Huxley	Episode: "Angel"
2007	Roman Mysteries	Actius	Episode: "The Pirates of Pompeii"
2008	The Sarah Jane Adventures	Eddie Smith	Episode: "The Temptation of Sarah Jane Smith"
2008	The Bill	Richard O'Leary	Episode: "One Day, But Not Today"
2009	Planet Ajay	Mr. Killjoy	
2010	The Legend of Dick and Dom	Trevor	Episode: "Sirens"
2012	Hunted	Desk Sergent Williams	Episode: "Khyber"
2013	Sooty	Gerald Smedley	Episode: "The Inventions Game"
2015	Cradle to Grave	Dougie	Episode #1.2
2017	Stan Lee's Lucky Man	Banker	Episode: "Lamb to the Slaughter"
2022	EastEnders	Malcolm Keeble	Episode 6550

=== Web series ===
Year	Title	Role
2015	The Basil Brush Show	Mr. Stephen

== Radio ==
Year	Title	Role	Channel	Ref.
2001	Brimstone	Bence	BBC Radio 4	
2001	Outside Child	Plato James	BBC Radio 4	
2007–2011	Big Toe Books	Presenter	BBC Radio 7	

== Theatre ==
- Biloxi Blues as Don Carney (National Youth Theatre)
- By Jeeves as Bingo Little (New Vic Theatre)
- Cinderella as Buttons (Spillers Pantomime)
- Into the Woods as Jack (Donmar Warehouse)
- Dick Whittington as Dick Whittington (Richmond Theatre)
- Dick Whittington as Sleepy Jack (Salisbury Playhouse)
- Ham as Paul Matthews (New Vic Theatre)
- Jack and the Beanstalk as Simple Simon (UK Productions)
- On The Piste as Dave Trueman (Derby Theatre)
- Peter Pan as Smee (UK Productions)
- The Basil Brush Theatre Show as Mr Stephen (Basil Brush Ltd)
- The Demon Headmaster as Lloyd Hunter (Churchill Theatre)
- The Wind in the Willows as Mole (West Yorkshire Playhouse)
- Sleeping Beauty as Silly Billy (UK Productions)
- Up on the Roof as Tim (Oldham Coliseum Theatre)
- Vincent in Brixton as Sam Plowman (Manchester Central Library)
- Zigger Zagger as Harry (Royal National Theatre)
