= Tickety Toc =

Television series

- Genre: Preschool education Comedy
- Created by: Gil Hoon Jung
- Theme music composer: Mr Miller & Mr Porter
- Opening theme: Tickety Toc
- Ending theme: Tickety Toc (Instrumental)
- Countries of origin: South Korea; United Kingdom
- Original languages: English; Korean
- No. of seasons: 5
- No. of episodes: 59

Production
- Executive producers: Nigel Pickard; Vanessa Hill
- Producer: Karina Stanford-Smith
- Running time: 11 minutes
- Production companies: The Foundation; FunnyFlux Entertainment

Original release
- Network: EBS (South Korea); Nick Jr. (UK); Channel 5 (UK)
- Release: 19 April 2012 – 16 January 2016

Tickety Toc is a preschool comedy animated television series produced by The Foundation, part of Zodiak Media and FunnyFlux Entertainment. The first series consists of 52 episodes, each 11 minutes long, but is often shown as twenty-six blocks, each containing two episodes.

The first series was acquired by the Nick Jr. Channel as part of a global deal. The series premiered in Asia on 19 April 2012 and was subsequently rolled out internationally with localised dubs. Tickety Toc aired for the first time on British TV on 23 April 2012 and became the number 1 daytime show on Nick Jr. in the United States for the first three months when it launched 10 September 2012. In addition to the Nick Jr. global acquisition, the show has been sold to free-to-air television partners internationally. Launching on Channel 5's Milkshake slot 1 November 2012. Other broadcasters who have picked up the 52-episode series include TG4 in Ireland and Family Channel in Canada. Anchor Bay Entertainment has picked-up the North American and U.K. home entertainment rights to the series.

Jolly Roger or Amusement Rides LTD made a Pufferty kiddie ride, featuring the main characters Tommy and Tallulah. It features a mirror, so anyone can see themselves on Pufferty, the Tickety Toc theme tune, and four sound effects.

In the United States, Tickety Toc originally aired on Nickelodeon's preschool block Nick Jr., but was later burned off to the Nick Jr. Channel on weekdays. The series has a page on the Paramount+ website, but no episodes have been added as of September 2026.

== Premise ==
The show takes place in the world within the Tickety Toc Clock, which is located in the middle of a wall of clocks inside an old clock shop. Behind the clock's face is an extraordinary world where things do not always run smoothly. The show's main characters, siblings Tommy and Tallulah, race against time to keep the Tickety Toc Clock ticking and chiming the time. They do everything with enthusiasm, commitment, and positivity, even if it gets them into trouble. Every hour, Tommy and Tallulah must return to the clock for "Chime Time", when the clock is to strike and chime the hour; should they fail to make it back to the clock before then, the clock will never chime.

Among the characters who live in the clock's world are Pufferty, a dog-train hybrid; cheetah handyman McCoggins, rabbit Hopparoo, the twins' caretaker cow Madame Au Lait, bat shopkeeper Battersby, chicken Chickadee, and gardener snail Lopsiloo. Throughout the episodes, an owl named Tooteroo tries to do a certain activity, sometimes based on the episode's theme, but is always unlucky.

== Characters ==
The show's characters are Tommy, Tallulah, Pufferty (a dog-train hybrid), McCoggins (a cheetah), Hopparoo (a hare), Madame Au Lait (a cow), Battersby (a bat), Chickadee (a chicken), Lopsiloo (a snail), Tooteroo (an owl) and the Spring chicks with mother hen.

== Voice cast ==
=== Korean version ===
- Taejun Eom (Season 1) and Jongwon Lee (Season 2) as Tommy
- Choi Da-in as Tallulah
- Jeong Hye-ok as Pufferty
- Byun Young-hee as McCoggins
- Sang-Hyeon Eom as Hopparoo
- Hong So-young as Madame Au Lait
- Jeong Mi-ra as Chickadee
- Shin Yong-woo as Battersby
- Kim Eun-ah as Lopsiloo
- Oh Byeong-jo as Tooteroo

=== British version ===
- Toby Ralph as Tommy
- Ruby Love as Tallulah
- Elly Fairman as Pufferty
- Lewis MacLeod as McCoggins and Battersby
- David Holt as Hopparoo
- Felicity Duncan as Madame Au Lait
- Katy Wix as Chickadee
- Gemma Harvey as Lopsiloo

=== American version ===
- Koda Cursoy as Tommy
- Isabelle Seratch as Tallulah
- Luke Cawley and Nathaniel Logan Mclntyre as Pufferty
- Marc Silk as McCoggins
- Philippa Alexander as Hopparoo
- Patricia Rodriguez as Madame Au Lait and Chickadee
- Eric Meyers as Battersby
- Larissa Murray as Lopsiloo

== Episodes ==
Series	Episodes	Originally released	
Series	Episodes	First released	Last released
1	13	10 September 2012	7 December 2012
2	8	21 January 2013	14 December 2013
3	4	14 November 2014	28 November 2014
4	10	17 January 2015	22 October 2015
5	4	11 January 2016	14 January 2016

=== Season 1 (2012) ===
No. overall	No. in season	Title	Original release date
1	1	"Bubble Time"	13 September 2012 (Nickelodeon); 29 September 2012 (Nick Jr. Channel)
1	1	"Fruity Pudding Time"	13 September 2012 (Nickelodeon); 29 September 2012 (Nick Jr. Channel)
When Tommy and Tallulah unleash an enormous unpoppable bubble in Tickety Town, it soon sucks up everyone in town – except Hopparoo. Madame Au Lait wants to make her famous Fruity Trifle so Tommy and Tallulah take over her polishing.
2	2	"Jelly Sandwich Time"	12 September 2012 (Nickelodeon); 30 September 2012 (Nick Jr. Channel)
2	2	"Bell Time"	12 September 2012 (Nickelodeon); 30 September 2012 (Nick Jr. Channel)
The twins accidentally spill jelly on their blanket while eating jelly sandwiches. Afraid that Madame Au Lait will find out, they race to clean up the mess before she sees it—and before Chime Time arrives. Tommy and Tallulah are collecting McCoggins' bell in time for a town performance.
3	3	"Bug Time"	19 September 2012 (Nickelodeon); 1 October 2012 (Nick Jr. Channel)
3	3	"Exercise Time"	19 September 2012 (Nickelodeon); 1 October 2012 (Nick Jr. Channel)
Tommy and Tallulah befriend a bug and call it Larry. When they decide to make Larry a new home, the bug escapes. The twins chase Larry all over town, before realising that Larry was returning to his little family of bugs! Tommy and Tallulah get Tickety Town exercising, and at first, everything goes great. But when they push everyone a little too hard, the whole town becomes so tired that they fall asleep. Now, Tommy and Tallulah must wake everyone up before Chime Time.
4	4	"Show Time"	20 September 2012 (Nickelodeon); 2 October 2012 (Nick Jr. Channel)
4	4	"Swap Time"	20 September 2012 (Nickelodeon); 2 October 2012 (Nick Jr. Channel)
It's Show Time and Tommy and Tallulah enlist Battersby as their star act. It is Swap Time and everyone in Tickety Town is swapping things they don't want for things they do.
5	5	"Watermelon Time"	11 September 2012 (Nickelodeon); 3 October 2012 (Nick Jr. Channel)
5	5	"Mystery Time"	11 September 2012 (Nickelodeon); 3 October 2012 (Nick Jr. Channel)
Tommy and Tallulah are sent to fetch a large watermelon… but mistake it for a giant pumpkin. When food suddenly goes missing from all over Tickety Town, Tommy and Tallulah are determined to solve the mystery and find out who took them.
6	6	"Treasure Time"	18 September 2012 (Nickelodeon); 4 October 2012 (Nick Jr. Channel)
6	6	"Hide and Seek Time"	18 September 2012 (Nickelodeon); 4 October 2012 (Nick Jr. Channel)
The twins go after a runaway spring. Pufferty hides too well while playing hide-and-seek.
7	7	"Finding Time"	17 September 2012 (Nickelodeon); 5 October 2012 (Nick Jr. Channel)
7	7	"Make a Pot Time"	17 September 2012 (Nickelodeon); 5 October 2012 (Nick Jr. Channel)
It's McCoggins' cog finding competition. Tommy and Tallulah quickly find all the cogs. However, they don't want to spoil the fun so put them back using a pair of clockwork rollerskates, which quickly go out of control! When Tommy and Tallulah accidentally break Madame Au Lait's handmade pot, they set about making a replacement.
8	8	"Race Time"	10 September 2012 (Nickelodeon); 22 October 2012 (Nick Jr. Channel)
8	8	"Bouncy Time"	10 September 2012 (Nickelodeon); 22 October 2012 (Nick Jr. Channel)
It's Race Time and Hopparoo has beaten everyone in town… except for Tallulah. It's Bouncing Time and Tommy and Tallulah compete to see who can bounce the highest. They bounce higher and higher… until they can't stop!
9	9	"Package Time"	3 December 2012 (Nick Jr. Channel)
9	9	"Bake a Cake Time"	3 December 2012 (Nick Jr. Channel)
Tommy and Tallulah are delivering a precious package to Madame Au Lait. Unfortunately, a little carelessness on the way sends the package on a crazy journey around Tickety Town, with Tommy and Tallulah in hot pursuit. When Madame Au Lait is called away to give Chickadee her ping pong lesson, Tommy and Tallulah bake a massive sticky carroty cake on their own. Ignoring the recipe, they make so much mixture that the oven explodes when they try to cook it, showering the whole town with sticky gunk and bringing Pufferty to a standstill!
10	10	"Doctor Time"	4 December 2012 (Nick Jr. Channel)
10	10	"Badge Time"	4 December 2012 (Nick Jr. Channel)
It's Doctor time and Tommy and Tallulah are playing doctors. They search the whole town for a patient in need, without much luck. Super Scouts Tommy and Tallulah are trying to win their good deeds badge from Troop Leader Au Lait. When they rush their list of deeds however, they cause more problems than they solve!
11	11	"Flying Time"	5 December 2012 (Nick Jr. Channel)
11	11	"Pirate Time"	5 December 2012 (Nick Jr. Channel)
Food is disappearing all over town, and the twins try to find out why. Tommy and Tallulah are playing pirates and haunting for Madame Au Lait's treasure. Hopparoo the pirate has designs on their cardboard boat and concocts a cunning plan to get his hands on it!
12	12	"Museum Time"	6 December 2012 (Nick Jr. Channel)
12	12	"Winter Time"	6 December 2012 (Nick Jr. Channel)
Tommy and Tallulah are determined to find the Lost Clock of Tickety. When they find it, they unwittingly let loose a giant bouncing bouncer! The twins try to make pottery and wind up covering the town in snow.
13	13	"Igloo Time"	7 December 2012 (Nick Jr. Channel)
13	13	"Snow Time"	7 December 2012 (Nick Jr. Channel)
Tommy and Tallulah try to build an igloo big enough to accommodate a party for the whole town. Tommy and Tallulah want to build a snowman, but there is not enough snow. They use McCoggins' weather machine to try to make snow, with disastrous results.

=== Season 2 (2013) ===
No. overall	No. in season	Title	Original release date
14	1	"Birthday Time"	21 January 2013 (Nick Jr. Channel)
14	1	"Giggle Time"	21 January 2013 (Nick Jr. Channel)
It's McCoggins' birthday and Tommy and Talluah are determined to throw him a party. When Chickadee gets stuck in a giant cake and rolls around causing chaos, the twins realise they have bitten off more than they can chew. Tommy and Tallulah try to make everyone laugh – and when they accidentally give McCoggins a case of gigglitis, they realise that they have interfered with a very important job at the clock.
15	2	"Photo Time"	22 January 2013 (Nick Jr. Channel)
15	2	"Help a Friend Time"	22 January 2013 (Nick Jr. Channel)
Tommy and Tallulah are under strict instructions to keep clean for Madame Au Lait's town photograph. However this proves a little difficult when the rest of the town need the twin's help with some messy jobs! Tommy and Tallulah try to help some of their friends, but they jump in without first asking what anyone actually needs. Their well-meaning efforts only make things worse, so now they must fix their mistakes in time for Chime Time.
16	3	"Picnic Time"	23 January 2013 (Nick Jr. Channel)
16	3	"Stickety Time"	23 January 2013 (Nick Jr. Channel)
Tommy and Tallulah are organising the Tickety Town picnic. But when everyone has a different idea about what makes the perfect picnic things soon end up in chaos with Chime Time under threat! Tommy and Tallulah borrow McCoggins Stickety machine to find Pufferty's lost ball. When the machine goes into overdrive everyone in town finds themselves stuck together! Luckily Pufferty's missing ball appears just at the right time!
17	4	"Tidy Time"	24 January 2013 (Nick Jr. Channel)
17	4	"Dancing Time"	24 January 2013 (Nick Jr. Channel)
When Tommy and Tallulah try to help Madame au Lait by tidying the Clockhouse, they realise that they have recycled her precious recipes! Tommy and Tallulah are competing in the town dancing contest. Tommy has a crisis of confidence and employs a pair of mechanical dancing shoes to help. When he over-winds his shoes, they go out of control!
18	5	"Tune Time"	25 January 2013 (Nick Jr. Channel)
18	5	"Story Time"	25 January 2013 (Nick Jr. Channel)
Tommy and Tallulah try to find Battersby an instrument to play in the town Moo Tune concert. Battersby can't play a thing - but his skills in organising make him the perfect conductor! Tommy and Tallulah try to tell Tickety Town the exciting story of Cogzilla. When the last page of the story is missing, everyone in town is desperate to hear how the story ends – before Chime Time!
19	6	"Nature Trail Time"	6 July 2013 (Nick Jr. Channel)
19	6	"Visiting Time"	6 July 2013 (Nick Jr. Channel)
McCoggins takes Tommy and Tallulah on a nature trail, with a list of important things to see. In their excitement, the twins lead McCoggins on a wild chase through the countryside! When Hopparoo's cousin, Bopparoo, comes to visit everyone is very excited – especially Tommy and Tallulah.
20	7	"Leaf Sweeping Time"	27 October 2013 (Nick Jr. Channel)
20	7	"Dress Up Time"	27 October 2013 (Nick Jr. Channel)
Tommy and Tallulah offer to help McCoggins use his leaf sweeping machine. Tommy and Tallulah are determined to surprise Hopparoo with their Dress Up Time Outfits.
21	8	"Christmas Present Time"	14 December 2013 (Nick Jr. Channel)
It's Christmas time in Tickety Town, and Tommy & Tallulah are determined to make every second count! They find a new way to make snow, build a giant igloo, roll the biggest snowball ever, and even help Santa fix his sleigh in time for Christmas Eve! But when their escapades get out of hand, friends like McCoggins, Pufferty, Madame Au Lait and Tooteroo will help them make things right.

=== Season 3 (2014) ===
No. overall	No. in season	Title	Original release date
22	1	"Balloon Time"	14 November 2014 (Nick Jr. Channel)
22	1	"News Time"	14 November 2014 (Nick Jr. Channel)
Tommy and Tallulah get stranded in McCoggins' hot air balloon, high above Tickety Town! Luckily Battersby is on hand to ferry a pile of heavy watermelons up to the twins to weight them down again! When they need a story for the Tickety Times, Tommy and Tallulah find themselves promising that a circus is coming to town. The whole town is excited so it's up to the twins to make the circus happen!
23	2	"Veggie Time"	24 November 2014 (Nick Jr. Channel)
23	2	"Whackerty Time"	24 November 2014 (Nick Jr. Channel)
Tommy and Tallulah try to find a faster way to pick Lopsiloo's vegetables. Tommy is desperate to get the hang of the game of Whackerty, to compete in a town tournament. He tries to play like everyone else, with disastrous results. Things work out for Tommy when he learns to play his own way!
24	3	"Funfair Time"	26 November 2014 (Nick Jr. Channel)
24	3	"Old Things Time"	26 November 2014 (Nick Jr. Channel)
Pufferty is too big to have fun at the Fun Fair, so the twins decide he can be a roller coaster; when McCoggins attaches a booster pack, the pup speeds out of control. The twins discover Madame Au Lait's old stunt plane. They fix it up hoping to get her to perform her high flying tricks, and Madame Au Lait must call on her high-flying skills of old.
25	4	"Play Time"	28 November 2014 (Nick Jr. Channel)
25	4	"Bath Time"	28 November 2014 (Nick Jr. Channel)
The twins are playing Tickety Tag. Soon the whole town is involved and Tommy and Tallulah raise the stakes! With no one wanting to lose, the whole town hides! Tommy and Tallulah try all sorts of methods to give Pufferty a much needed wash!

=== Season 4 (2015) ===
No. overall	No. in season	Title	Original release date
26	1	"Outer Space Time"	17 January 2015 (Nick Jr. Channel)
26	1	"Painting Time"	17 January 2015 (Nick Jr. Channel)
Tallulah and Tommy go on an intergalactic adventure in the outskirts of the city. While playing, they completely forget about time, so McCoggins must find them before it's too late to ring the time. There's an art exhibition in town and the twins decide they want to paint the biggest picture; shortly before the exhibition, however, her huge picture, on which the clock house can be seen, is blown away by the wind.
27	2	"Dino Time"	17 January 2015 (Nick Jr. Channel)
27	2	"Robot Time"	17 January 2015 (Nick Jr. Channel)
The twins find the bones of an ancient Clockosaurus. They put them all together and mistakenly wind up the giant dinosaur, setting it loose on the town. The twins cause McCoggins' robot to short circuit and go berserk. It won't follow orders and they need it to fix a section of track before Chime Time. Can they make the robot obey in time?
28	3	"Talent Time"	24 January 2015 (Nick Jr. Channel)
There is a buzz in town as it's finally time for the world famous Tickety Talent Time show. All our residents are practising their dancing, singing and bell ringing to try and impress the svengali judge, Bopparoo!
29	4	"Fix It Time"	24 January 2015 (Nick Jr. Channel)
29	4	"Itchy Time"	24 January 2015 (Nick Jr. Channel)
When Tommy takes apart McCoggins' truck to fix it, he forgets to put back an important part. Now McCoggins is in the truck, unable to stop. The twins must put the part back! Everyone is itching. They think it's a case of train-dog fleas. Feeling it's his fault, Pufferty runs away. But there's more to this mystery, and the twins must solve it before Chime Time!
30	5	"Easter Egg Time"	4 April 2015 (Nick Jr. Channel)
30	5	"Easter Parade Time"	4 April 2015 (Nick Jr. Channel)
Tommy and Tallulah decorate scores of eggs for the Easter Egg Hunt. When hiding them, Hopparoo breaks the prized golden egg. The competition to make the best Easter Parade float leads to a big collision at the town clock. Everyone must work together to build a new float from the wreckage.
31	6	"Measuring Time"	6 April 2015 (Nick Jr. Channel)
31	6	"Camping Time"	6 April 2015 (Nick Jr. Channel)
Hopparoo is disappointed when everyone gathers for Measuring Time. He was sure he'd grown more. Tommy and Tallulah have some crazy ideas about how to add inches, but a super-tall rabbit rampaging through town on stilts can only cause chaos. Tommy and Tallulah declare it's `Camping Time' and set off for the Gnarly Tree, but when the Spring Chicks tag along and pester them for their banana muffins, they move camp and forget to tell anyone where they have gone - causing a dreadful panic in Tickety town as Chime Time approaches.
32	7	"Model Making Time"	20 July 2015 (Nick Jr. Channel)
32	7	"Spring Chicks Time"	20 July 2015 (Nick Jr. Channel)
Tickety legend has it that McCoggins is building an amazing model of the clockhouse out of lollipop sticks. No one has seen it yet and the whole town is waiting for the grand unveiling, but when McCoggins asks Tommy and Tallulah to help him finish his model, the twins accidentally smash it. When Tommy and Tallulah agree to babysit the spring chicks while Madame Au Lait tends to Mother Chick's hurt wing, they don't realise that how much of a handful the chicks will be. The twins are also taking part in the town kite display today, but somehow the chicks end up surfing on their kite, high in the sky!
33	8	"Ball Time"	22 July 2015 (Nick Jr. Channel)
33	8	"Bowling Time"	22 July 2015 (Nick Jr. Channel)
When the twins inflate their punctured ball it blows up to the size of a house. As the air rushes out, it rockets off with them attached. And they are blown to a far off island! Tommy's fingers get stuck in McCoggins' automatic bowling ball, and he's dragged all over town. The ball must be stopped before it knocks down all of Tickety!
34	9	"Vacation Time"	24 July 2015 (Nick Jr. Channel)
When the Tickety Townsfolk set sail on the high seas for their annual holiday, no one suspects that there's a storm brewing, and our pals get marooned on a desert island.
35	10	"Trick or Treat Time"	22 October 2015 (Nick Jr. Channel)
35	10	"Spooky Time"	22 October 2015 (Nick Jr. Channel)
Madame Au Lait asks Tommy and Tallulah to help her make her toffee sweets for the Halloween party, but they add too much of one ingredient! While preparing for the Spooky Party, Pufferty is scared by his own reflection and races off into the woods. The twins go after but must conquer their own fears to bring him back in time!

=== Season 5 (2016) ===
No. overall	No. in season	Title	Original release date
36	1	"Superhero Time"	11 January 2016 (Nick Jr. Channel)
36	1	"Magic Time"	11 January 2016 (Nick Jr. Channel)
Tommy and Tallulah play superheroes but only Tommy's powers seem to be doing all the saving. But when Pufferty goes out of control, Tallulah puts her super strong hands to work! While performing a magic trick, McCoggins thinks he's actually made Hopparoo disappear. The search for the missing bunny takes the twins far, far from town!
37	2	"Weather Time"	12 January 2016 (Nick Jr. Channel)
37	2	"Sports Time"	12 January 2016 (Nick Jr. Channel)
The twins try to help Chickadee jazz up her weather reports with large, mechanical devices. When the huge fan they install goes haywire, they must figure out how to turn it off! Tommy and Tallulah look forward to winning medals in the Tickety-lympics Sports Games. They'll have to use their special ability to win the day before Chime Time.
38	3	"Go Kart Time"	13 January 2016 (Nick Jr. Channel)
38	3	"Driving Time"	13 January 2016 (Nick Jr. Channel)
Tommy takes the Clockhouse key to make his Go-Kart go faster and win the Go-Kart race. When he can't put the key back in time for Chime Time, all must band together to save the day. Pufferty is worried that the twins' new car will take his place. But when they ride their new car into the mud and get stuck, Puff rescues them and discovers how irreplaceable he is.
39	4	"Solve a Mystery Time"	14 January 2016 (Nick Jr. Channel)
39	4	"Training Time"	14 January 2016 (Nick Jr. Channel)
Some mysterious sticky goo starts appearing and gumming up things in Tickety Town. Tommy and Tallulah must figure out the source of the mystery goo and how to unstick Pufferty! Pufferty shows a real talent for doing dog train tricks. But is he experienced enough to beat three older dog trains in the first ever Tickety Town Dog Train Contest?

== International broadcasts ==
Tickety Toc aired on EBS in South Korea. Tickety Toc aired on Channel 5, and is now airing on Sky Kids, in the United Kingdom. In the United States, all episodes of Tickety Toc aired from 2012 until 2018 on the Nick Jr. Channel.

== Reception ==
The show was met with mixed reviews. Emily Ashby of Common Sense Media gave the show four stars out of five, saying that "the lively series exposes preschoolers to concepts of time."

== Merchandise ==
Zodiak Rights, the Consumer Products Licensing division of the Zodiak Media Group, launched merchandise, including toys, books, games and clothing, internationally starting in fall 2013. Vivid Imaginations and Just Play were the master toy partners for Tickety Toc globally. International licensing agents represented Tickety Toc in the following countries:

- United States – Established Brands
- Canada – Studio Licensing
- France – Zodiak Kids, Paris
- Australia – Fusion
- Benelux – J & M Brands
