= Ivan Owen =

British actor (1927–2000)

- A rare photograph of Ivan Owen, who was typically not photographed as per his wishes.
- Born: 19 August 1927; Dulwich, London, England
- Died: 17 October 2000 (aged 73); Plymouth, England
- Occupation: Voice actor
- Years active: 1954–2000
- Known for: Inventing and performing Basil Brush
- Spouse: Jennifer Meek (m. 1955)
- Children: 3

Ivan Owen (19 August 1927 – 17 October 2000) was a British actor, mainly a voice actor, who created the vocal persona of the puppet Basil Brush. He performed as Basil from the early 1960s until his death.

== Life and career ==
Born in Dulwich, south London, Owen did his National Service after World War II, and thus came into contact with Terry Scott. After being demobbed, he attended the London Academy of Music and Dramatic Art but did not finish his course. He then worked in repertory theatre.

Owen had already developed expertise in puppet voices when he met Peter Firmin, Basil's designer, in the 1960s. He voiced Basil from his first appearance in 1963, which he modelled, it is reported, on that of Terry-Thomas. He also operated the puppet, although the only moving part of it was the mouth. As well as Basil Brush, he provided the voice for another well-known television puppet, the dog "Fred Barker". Basil Brush, who had made his first on-screen appearance in 1963, returned to star in his own show between 1968 and the 1980s.

Although Basil Brush was once ubiquitous in Britain and many countries of the Commonwealth, Owen maintained his anonymity throughout the height of the puppet's prominence during the 1970s, never giving television interviews or allowing himself to be photographed as he believed it would "break Basil's spell". He did, however, record one radio interview after he retired as Basil's voice. He died of cancer in 2000, aged 73, in Plymouth.
