= Laura Evans (actress) =

Welsh actress and singer (born 1986)

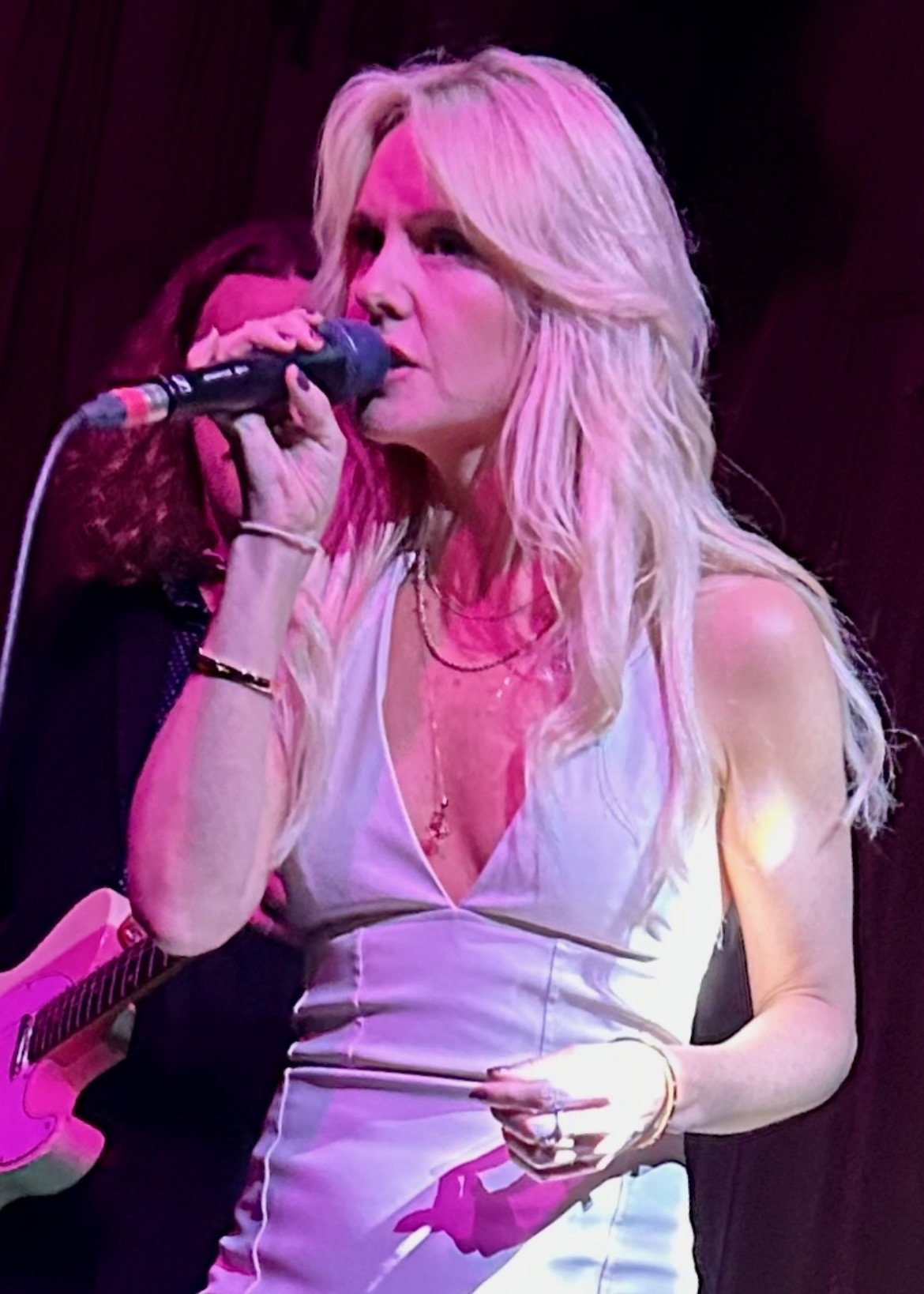
- Evans performing at Gullivers in Manchester, England, 2023
- Born: 27 August 1986 (age 40); Aberdare, Wales, United Kingdom
- Education: Sylvia Young Theatre School
- Occupations: Actress; singer

Laura Evans (born 27 August 1986) is a British actress and singer from Aberdare, Wales, best known for her role as Madison Square-Gardens in the popular BBC television children's show The Basil Brush Show and more currently known as a country blues singer.

== Early training ==
Laura Evans was born on 27 August 1986 to Norman and Marilyn Evans in Aberdare. At the age of 14, Evans won a scholarship to the prestigious Sylvia Young Theatre School in London. and trained with her classmates, who included Billie Piper and Amy Winehouse

As a child, Evans performed the lead role at the Edinburgh Festival with the acclaimed National Youth Music Theatre in their production of Annie, before going on to play Blousey Brown one of the lead females in the BBC's radio production of Bugsy Malone.

== Acting career ==
Evans was one of the lead roles in BBC 's The Basil Brush Show, playing an American girl called Madison—which she based on Reese Witherspoon's performance in Legally Blonde, and on Phoebe from TV's Friends. Evans appeared as a regular on the show from 2004 until 2007, and her role as Basil's next door neighbour earned her a place in television folklore as a member of Basil's gang. The episode 'Basils Angels' from the fourth series was nominated for a children's BAFTA Award in 2006. Evans has had several leading roles in pantomimes. She played the lead role in Cinderella at the Bristol Hippodrome in 2004 and 2005, reprised the role at the Liverpool Empire Theater a year later, and played Cinderella a third time at the Theatre Royal in 2008 and 2009. She has also appeared in Dick Whittington and His Cat in Northampton opposite Julian Clary in 2006 and 2007, and again at the Capitol Theatre in London opposite Todd Carty in 2007 and 2008. In 2013, Evans appeared in the comedy feature film Inappropriate Comedy alongside Lindsay Lohan and Adrien Brody. In September 2014, she joined other well known Welsh and American actors to celebrated the 100th birthday of Dylan Thomas, appearing in a staged radio play of Under Milk Wood, with L.A. Theatre Works alongside Matthew Rhys and Kate Burton, and directed by Sara Sugarman, playing several roles and singing the famous folk song as character, Polly Garter. She has more recently played Belle in the Newcastle pantomime, Beauty and the Beast, at the Theatre Royal, Newcastle from November 2019 to January 2020. She has also played Tinker Bell, Goldilocks and Cinderella at the Theatre Royal Newcastle in Peter Pan, Goldilocks and the Three Bears and Cinderella.

== Music career ==
In April 2014, Evans released a country EP called Remember When, including the song "More of Me" co-written with Ben Spivak from the band Magic!. They were featured on the season 2 finale of the full episode of, Party Down South, on the CMT channel. In 2015, "What's Left of Me" co-written with country singer-songwriter Brett Detar and Nashville Producer Jeff Zacharski was featured on the second season of the Party Down South. In May 2020, Evans released a single "Running Back To You" co-written with Ben Spivak. The single topped the UK iTunes blues chart and reached 43 on US blues chart. Her follow up single "Drag Me Back In" co-written with Desi Valentine was released in June 2020 and reached number 2 on the UK blues chart. It received continued radio support from BBC Radio Wales and airplay on Planet Rock Radio. In 2022, Evans released her 11 track debut album, State Of Mind. It included the single "I'm Alright" and "Fire with Fire" and peaked at number 1 on the UK blues chart. In May 2022, Evans toured as special guest with the Californian rock band, Robert Jon & the Wreck. The album was well received by the UK media and featured in several printed press magazines.

== Filmography ==
- Dreams of Gold (1994)
- No Sweat (1998)
- The Basil Brush Show (2004 to 2007)
- Black Tower Temptation (2009)
- Schizofredric (2010)
- Capture Anthologies: The Dimensions of Self (2011)
- Underground Comedy (2011)

== See also ==
- The Basil Brush Show
