= The Peter Serafinowicz Show =

British TV comedy sketch show 2007–08

- Genre: Sketch comedy; Cringe comedy; Satire
- Created by: Peter Serafinowicz; James Serafinowicz
- Starring: Peter Serafinowicz
- Theme music composer: Syd Dale
- Opening theme: Opening Trailer 1 by Syd Dale
- Country of origin: United Kingdom
- Original language: English
- No. of series: 1
- No. of episodes: 7

Production
- Editor: Paul Machliss
- Running time: 30 minutes
- Production companies: Objective Productions; Hey Hey Hey Ltd.

Original release
- Network: BBC Two
- Release: 4 October 2007 – 23 December 2008

The Peter Serafinowicz Show is a British sketch comedy show written by and starring Peter Serafinowicz. Its debut was on 4 October 2007 at 21:30 on BBC Two as part of the newly launched "Thursdays Are Funny" brand on the channel and Thursdays on ABC2. On 1 August 2008, American cable network G4 began broadcasting the show as part of their "Duty Free TV" block of international programming. The BBC decided not to produce a second series. A Christmas Special was aired on 23 December 2008.

== Background ==
The show was commissioned after Serafinowicz posted O! News, a parody of E! News, on YouTube, under the name "Immenstrides". Robert Popper, who co-wrote, and co-starred in, both series of Look Around You with Serafinowicz, co-wrote four episodes of The Peter Serafinowicz Show and was a programme consultant for the entire series.

== Format ==
The show was a mixture of sketches based on parodies of British television, using Serafinowicz's and other actors' impressions of notable television personalities. Examples include Heads or Tails, which is a parody of Who Wants to Be a Millionaire?, using the same mannerisms as Chris Tarrant. (Channel Five later created a real show based on the same principles.)

In addition to Serafinowicz, recurring cast members included Belinda Stewart-Wilson, Catherine Shepherd, Paul Putner, Alex Lowe, Bronagh Gallagher, Sarah Alexander and Benedict Wong. Robert Popper, Sanjeev Kohli and Matt Berry also made onscreen appearances.

== Ratings ==
Episode	Airdate	Ratings	Audience share
1	4 October 2007	1.5 million	7%
2	11 October 2007	1 million	5%
3	18 October 2007	800,000	4%
4	25 October 2007	900,000	5%
5	1 November 2007	900,000	4%
6	8 November 2007	800,000	Unknown

== Cancellation ==
The show was cancelled after its first series by the BBC. Serafinowicz posted a mock BBC News interview on YouTube stating he was leaving of his own accord due to being "unhappy with the BBC's decision to not recommission the series." The series was released on DVD on 1 February 2010.

== Recurring characters and sketches ==
- O! News: A parody of E! News, featuring apparent programme teasers and celebrity interviews. Serafinowicz plays the vapid host "Kennedy St King" as well as celebrities including Alan Alda and David Lynch.
- Acting Masterclass: A famous actor gives acting tips to a group of trainees. Actors featured have been (in order of appearance) Michael Caine, Al Pacino, Kevin Spacey, Ralph Fiennes (with the mannerisms and speech of a Rising Damp-era Leonard Rossiter), Robert De Niro and Marlon Brando (with the body of Jabba the Hutt). Serafinowicz plays the featured actor; Catherine Shepherd, Alex Lowe, Benedict Wong, Belinda Stewart-Wilson, and Sanjeev Kohli play the students.
- Brian Butterfield: An overweight middle-aged salesman who appears in various commercials for shoddy products and services of his own design, including a karaoke bar, a hotel, a firm of injury solicitors, a private detective service, a speaking clock service, which usually gives out inaccurate times, and a diet plan where the dieter is instructed to eat an absurdly small amount of food all day Monday to Friday, such as a single cornflake for breakfast and one baked bean for dinner, and then at the weekend is allowed to gorge for twenty-four hours on high calorie food, with many dishes being fictitious (hoisin crispy owl) or having ludicrous names (waffles being referred to as 'potato grids'). He has a habit of mispronouncing words and using descriptive language instead of simple phrases when speaking. This character is somewhat similar to the actor Basil Soper, who appeared in real advertisements on British television for the Personal Injury Helpline. The character appeared as a panellist on the comedy panel show Shooting Stars on 29 August 2011. Serafinowicz said in 2012 that a feature film was currently in development centred on Brian Butterfield's investigator agency. On 7 January 2013, he featured in his own sketch in the CBBC comedy programme Fit. In 2023, Butterfield embarked on a nationwide tour, hosting a seminar on his experiences in business.
- A Guide to Modern Life: A spoof on British self-help TV programmes of the 1970s. Advice is given on dealing with major life changes ('Let's... Get Married', 'Let's... Have a Baby', 'Let's... Get Fit', 'Let's... Have a Good Night's Sleep'), as well as more unusual acts ('Let's... Have an Orgy' and 'Let's... Pretend to Have Witnessed a Murder'). The husband-and-wife who feature in the segments are played by Serafinowicz and Belinda Stewart-Wilson respectively.
- Sherlock Holmes: A parody of Sherlock Holmes (Serafinowicz) and Dr. Watson (Alex Lowe) involving slash fiction. Watson congratulates Holmes on solving a case, which ends in Holmes forcibly kissing and undressing Watson. The two are later shown in bed (Watson's reaction suggests he has been raped), where Holmes states that his emotions run high when he solves a case.
- Buy It Channel: A parody of shopping channels in which unusual problems arise, such as one of the presenters being a vampire, or both presenters trying to rid the studio of an ant infestation. The two presenters are played by Serafinowicz and Catherine Shepherd.
- Michael-6: A robotic talk show host who attempts to help his troubled guests. Although equipped with technologically advanced systems, such as "gender scanning" and "lie detection", he has a tendency to malfunction at the end of every sketch, causing harm to studio members. His malfunctioning usually includes the secretion of white fluid, similar to that of the robotic life-forms in the Alien series. The studio technician who always ends up getting choked by Michael-6 is played by Peter Serafinowicz's brother James Serafinowicz (also a writer/producer on the series).
- BBN News: A newsreader attempts to improvise reading the news, only to be buzzed every time he says something incorrect. Thus the sketch becomes a battle to read the entire story correctly. It has a similar set and the same opening theme as ITV News.
- Ringo Remembers: A documentary series in which Ringo Starr reflects on particular (fictional) points in his career. Ringo's recollections include writing the title theme for the James Bond film Goldfinger (1964) in the style of his song "Don't Pass Me By"; a parody of the 1969 Let It Be sessions culminating in the Beatles performing a song about going to the toilet during their rooftop concert; the original "big-headed" lyrics of John Lennon's "Imagine" (1971); and the recording of Paul McCartney's "Sexual Christmas Night" (a parody of the real McCartney's 1979 single "Wonderful Christmastime"). During the course of the segments, Serafinowicz plays not only Ringo but the other three Beatles as well. Benedict Wong also appears as Yoko Ono.
- Sinister: A company that manufactures strange items. Examples include Internet Ham (a type of ham ordered online), Chesterfield pudding sofa (furniture advertised in the manner of the Marks & Spencer advertisements for food), and Evile (a skin cream that can only be obtained by selling your soul and pledging allegiance to Satan). The slogan of Sinister, "A family company", is the same as that of a real company, S. C. Johnson & Son.
- Complico: A department store which necessitates the customer to solve extreme mathematical tasks to find the prices of merchandises on sale. At the end of each ad, the slogan is always said: "Complico, always awkward prices!"
- Parodies of informative commercial advertisements. One example, hosted by Lola Llarlagh (Belinda Stewart-Wilson) and Nancy Cholesterholes (Serafinowicz) is for "Gem Mania", a product that allows somebody to attach gemstones to anything, with progressively better special offers which end with the company offering an infinite number of the product.
- A multi-part pop culture parody which runs through the entire episode. In one example, Star Wars character Darth Vader (Serafinowicz) falls for Commander Ada Larkin (Catherine Shepherd), a female co-worker wearing a pink version of his armour. The sketches cover his ill-fated attempts to court her; Paul Putner plays Ada's current boyfriend.
- Various parodies of sex line advertisements featuring different types of call workers, such as pirates, cavemen, zombies, drunkards and Basil Fawlty impersonators.
- Parodies of commercial ads for partwork magazines, which give away collectable items with each issue, or parts of items that require assembly once all parts have been collected. Examples of the magazines advertised include Gravies of the Ancients, Elephants & Trains, and a 2-shilling-cost British-Kenyan magazine about rings, wings, Bings, mings, stings, kings and tings.
- Detective drama shows have been parodied, including Columbo and a multi-part parody placing Hercule Poirot (Serafinowicz) and Miss Marple (Bronagh Gallagher) together, in which they distract their assistants (Paul Putner, Alex Lowe) so they can "have it off" with each other. In the final part, when Poirot learns that he has made Marple pregnant, he runs out of a window.
- A parody of Laurel and Hardy called "Soap and Water", where Stan Laurel (Serafinowicz) repeatedly says the "F-word", resulting in him and Oliver Hardy (Paul Putner) being arrested.
- Parodies of game shows such as The Weakest Link and Who Wants to Be a Millionaire?.
- Parodies of reality shows such as The X Factor and Big Brother.
- A parody of the Cillit Bang commercials for a product called Kitchen Gun, which is a firearm that the host "Derek Baum" uses to blast away at kitchen surfaces and appliances, cleaning and damaging them at the same time, and Toilet Grenade, a hand grenade covered in white paint that demolishes the toilet bowl to eliminate limescale and germs.

== Episode list ==
No.
1	"Episode 1"
Parodies of Big Brother and Who Wants to Be a Millionaire, the presenters of the Buy It Channel show their disgust at the items they're selling, Michael Caine shows a strange error with some camera lens, and adverts for limescale-clearing firearms.
2	"Episode 2"
O! News report on Elvis Presley's return, A Guide to Modern Life gives advice on having a baby, a TV station plant subliminal messaging into their broadcast, and Brian Butterfield advertises the Butterfield Detective Agency.
3	"Episode 3"
An advert for a new brand of ham that is produced online, Darth Vader falls in love, Michael-6 talks to a woman who cannot control her children, and Ringo Starr reminisces about when he wrote the theme for Goldfinger.
4	"Episode 4"
BBN report on a bank robbery, the Buy It Channel are infested with ants, Miss Marple and Poirot have an affair, and an advert for James Bond's stand-up comedy DVD.
5	"Episode 5"
Robert De Niro talks about improvisation, Brian Butterfield advertises his "hotel", the Robot Hunter tracks down a PX19, and BBN change their anchor's name.
6	"Episode 6"
A parody Marks and Spencer advert for a "Christmas pudding sofa", a 1940s version of Who Wants to Be a Millionaire, an advert for Rings, Wings, Bings, Mings, Stings, Kings & Tings Magazine, and Ringo Starr talks about appearing in the video for Paul McCartney's banned unsavoury Christmas song.
7	"Christmas Special"
A man leaves the room while on a double date to loudly rant about his wife, 30 Second Cook Off, Brian Butterfield celebrates Christmas by going down to the local youth centre dressed as Princess Diana, and Terry Wogan gets stoned on Points of View.

== Awards ==
For his performances in this series, Serafinowicz was awarded the Best Entertainer prize at the 2008 Rose d'Or ceremony.

The series was also nominated for Best Comedy Programme at the 2009 BAFTA Television Awards.

== Home media ==
The series 1 DVD was released on 1 February 2010.
