= Basil Soper =

British actor (1937–2013)

Basil Percy Soper (15 September 1937 – 1 June 2013) was a British actor and voice-over artist. He was best known for his work on the Basil Brush show and famous for presenting "The Personal Injury Helpline" adverts.

In 2007, it was suggested that Soper's advertisements for the Personal Injury Helpline were the inspiration for Peter Serafinowicz's character Brian Butterfield in BBC2's The Peter Serafinowicz Show. Initially from a sketch about a personal injury helpline entitled "Butterfield Direct", Butterfield became one of Serafinowicz's best known characters.

He also provided a voice over for the cinematic trailer of 'The Almighty Clean Up Of Hooliganism.'

He died in Victoria Hospital, Blackpool on 1 June 2013 from acute renal failure, sepsis and cellulitis of the legs with underlying heart disease.
