= Georgina Leonidas =

English actress

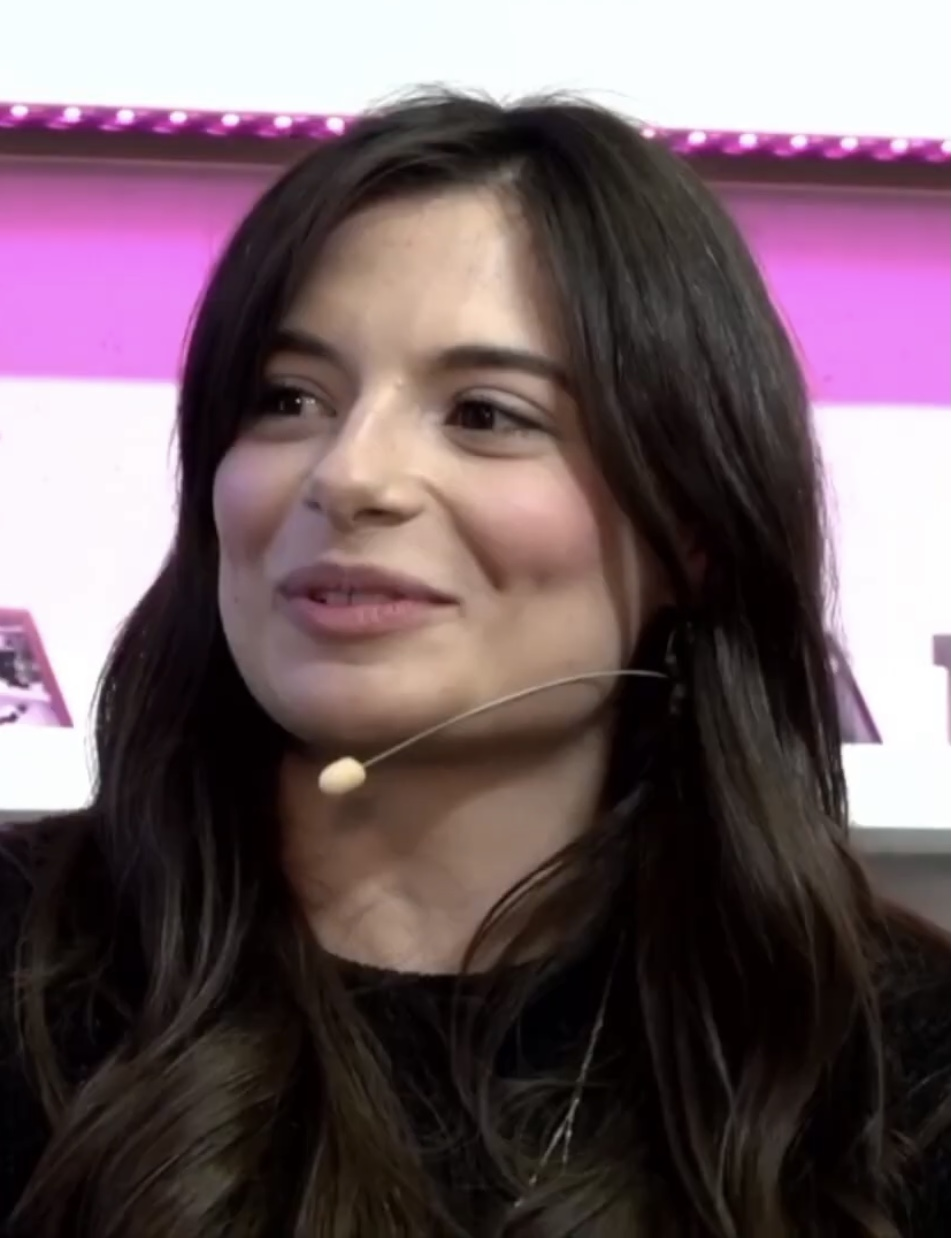
- Leonidas at the 2020 German Comic Con Home Edition
- Born: 28 February 1990 (age 36); London, England
- Occupation: Actress
- Years active: 1999–present
- Relatives: Dimitri Leonidas (brother); Stephanie Leonidas (sister)

Georgina Leonidas (born 28 February 1990) is an English actress. She is best known for her roles as Molly in the CBBC series The Basil Brush Show (2002–2007) and Katie Bell in the Harry Potter film series (2009–2011).

== Early life ==
Leonidas was born in London, the daughter of a Greek Cypriot father and an English mother. She also has Welsh ancestry through her mother. She has an older brother Dimitri and older sister Stephanie, both of whom are also actors.

== Career ==
Leonidas's first role was in 1999, when she played Little Cosette in Les Misérables on stage in London. She was then cast as Molly in The Basil Brush Show in 2002, appearing in every episode of series 1–4, then at different times from series 5 onwards.

After the Basil Brush show ended, she guest starred in the BBC TV series Holby City as Ali Jarvis in the episode "Stargazer" in early 2007, before being cast for the film Harry Potter and the Half-Blood Prince, as Katie Bell, Harry's fellow Gryffindor Quidditch player, on 19 December 2007, as well as voicing Katie in the associated video game. She then starred in the leading role of Maya in the short film Baghdad Express in 2008, and during 2009, she appeared alongside fellow Harry Potter star Isabella Laughland in the short film Driftwood, in New Tricks on 30 July 2009, as Kiraz Yilmaz in the episode "Fresh Starts", then as the Matron's Daughter in the film Nine, and as Andra in a BBC Switch adaptation of the Greek Myth The Fall Of Icarus.

Leonidas reprised her role of Katie Bell in Harry Potter and the Deathly Hallows – Part 1 and Harry Potter and the Deathly Hallows – Part 2 in 2010 and 2011, before appearing in the stage play The Real Thing and the film Papadopoulos & Sons in a small role during 2012. She has also appeared in several videos filmed by fellow Harry Potter star Jessie Cave for her website www.pindippy.com. During 2013, she played the lead role of Simone in the short film Untouchable, appeared as Gemma Raven in the CBBC series Wizards vs Aliens episodes 'The Curse Of Crowe' parts 1 and 2, and performed as Izzy in the Polly Stenham play That Face at London's Landor Theatre during November and December 2013. During 2014, she appeared as Lucía Amory in the Agatha Christie play Black Coffee, and then as Belle in Beauty and the Beast at the Theatre Royal in Windsor during December 2014, During 2016, she appeared as Millie in the play Small Hours.

== Filmography ==
=== Film ===
Year	Title	Role	Notes	Ref.
2008	Baghdad Express	Maya	Short film	
2009	Driftwood	Girlfriend		
2009	Harry Potter and the Half-Blood Prince	Katie Bell		
2009	Nine	Matron's Daughter		
2010	The Sky is Everywhere	Lennie		
2010	Harry Potter and the Deathly Hallows – Part 1	Katie Bell		
2011	Harry Potter and the Deathly Hallows – Part 2	Katie Bell		
2012	Papadopoulos & Sons	Doctor		
2013	Untouchable	Simone	Short film	
2026	Black Box	Yasmin		

=== Television ===
Year	Title	Role	Notes	Ref.
2002–2007	The Basil Brush Show	Molly	Main role	
2007	Holby City	Ali Jarvis	Episode: "Stargazer"	
2009	Myths	Andra	Episode: "The Fall of Icarus"	
2009	New Tricks	Kiraz Yilmaz	Episode: "Fresh Starts"	
2013	Wizards vs Aliens	Gemma Raven	2 episodes	
2015	Father Brown	Emily Fletcher	Episode: "The Truth in the Wine"	

=== Theatre ===
Year	Title	Role	Notes	Venue	Ref.
1999	Les Misérables	Little Cosette	London		
2010	First Time Voters	Master of Ceremonies	London	The Bush Theatre	
2012	The Real Thing	Debbie	Leeds		
2013	That Face	Izzy	London	The Landor Theatre, Clapham	
2014	Black Coffee	Lucía Amory	London		
2014–2015	Beauty and the Beast	Belle	London	Theatre Royal Windsor	
2016	Small Hours	Millie	London	Theatre Royal Windsor	
2017–2018	Awful Auntie	Lady Stella Saxby	London	Richmond Theatre	

=== Other ===
Year	Title	Role	Notes	Ref.
2009	Harry Potter and the Half-Blood Prince	Katie Bell (voice)	Video game	
2011	Participation in the website of Jessie Cave	several characters	pindippy.com	
