= Basil and Barney's Swap Shop =

British children's television series

- Genre: Children's
- Presented by: Basil Brush; Barney Harwood
- Country of origin: United Kingdom
- Original language: English
- No. of series: 3
- No. of episodes: 51

Production
- Executive producers: Alison Gregory; Ged Allen
- Producers: Ian France; Keith Cotton; Toby Smith; Tom Forbes
- Running time: 60 minutes
- Production company: The Foundation

Original release
- Network: BBC Two (2008-10); CBBC (2010)
- Release: 5 January 2008 – 25 September 2010

Related
- Multi-Coloured Swap Shop

Basil and Barney's Swap Shop (known as Basil's Swap Shop in the first two series) is a British children's television series that was produced for CBBC and ran on Saturday mornings on BBC Two and CBBC Channel from 5 January 2008 to 25 September 2010. Based on the original BBC children's Saturday morning show Multi-Coloured Swap Shop, which ran on BBC One from 1976 to 1982, it was hosted by Barney Harwood, along with veteran puppet character Basil Brush, from whom the show takes its title.

== New format ==
The new version of Swap Shop was broadcast live, and featured games and comedy sketches, as well as the "swap shop" itself (the studio audience brought items to exchange for this feature). Unlike the original series, this new format regularly features gungings for those taking part in the games. A total of three series were produced. In series 3, the name of the programme was changed to Basil and Barney's Swap Shop.

== History ==
=== Series 1 ===
The first series ran for thirteen episodes of one hour. In addition to main presenters Basil Brush and Barney Harwood, Melvin Odoom (ex regular of Dick and Dom in Da Bungalow and regular of The Slammer) was a featured performer who took a central role in many of the comedy sketches and games. Celebrity guests included David Schneider and Joe Pasquale.

Series one of Basil's Swap Shop featured gungey games. "Question Line", a game where children ask the celebrity guest questions and if the celebrity chooses to answer it the child doesn't get gunged. If however, the celebrity chooses not to answer the question the child asking the question slides into the gunge tank (a pool of gunge similar to the one on Waaa!!!). The children move as they are sitting in or lying across a rubber ring on a ramp with their legs hanging out on the "gungeulator" a red and white travelator. If the child does slide into the gunge tank then they have to move over and sit in the gunge tank until the game is over. Another game called Dunk Beds, features 3 teams of 2 children, with one on a bed attached to a platform and the other off the bed. The child off the bed pushes the bed off along the platform, with scoring zones. Up to a point, the points are negative, then past a certain point, the points became positive until finally off the scale. If the bed goes off the scale the child on the end of the bed slides into a tank of green coloured water. 0 points are awarded if the child gets dunked. Each child from each team is on the bed once during the duration of the game. In the final Game, the final 2 children, left over from the previous game, play on a moving platform called the gungeulator collecting objects, avoiding obstacles, to get them back to the start of the "gungeulator". If a child falls then he/she is automatically gunged and the child that is left continues the game. However, if the child left wins then prizes are awarded to both the children but if both children are gunged the game is over and no prized are awarded. Whilst playing these games the children are barefoot except the final game where the children are dressed in fat suits wearing trainers on a moving platform.

=== Series 2 ===
Series Two began without Melvin O'Doom on the presenting team. However, the show did feature a new comedy character, Ugly Yeti. The first two episodes did not have Basil live in the studio as he was ill in hospital. The amount of live swaps was reduced from 10 to 5 and popular sketch Zeroes did not return. Celebrity guests included Tom Daley. Team Sam & Lewis were proven to be the best when they made it to the final in Series 2. The credits for the show list Ugly Yeti as being played by Marcus Garvey. The "question line" and "gungeulator" segments no longer featured. The "Gunge Gallery" along with a tweaked "dunk beds" featured instead. The "Gunge Gallery" is five gunge tanks in a row in which children (members of a karate club, football team etc.)would be sat and one child would be chosen to be gunged after each successful swap. Each Child would be gunged by the end of the programme.

=== Series 3 ===
Marcus Garvey returned to play Ugly Yeti and the name had been changed to Basil and Barney's Swap Shop, not to forget the studio set refurbished. Dunk Beds and Yettis in Space returned, and 'Gold Brush Gold Rush' became the second game during the show. 'Goldbrush Goldrush' is set in a western style town and the two teams have to power a conveyor belt with buckets of 'brown sludge' up to a holder – the team who fills their holder first goes through to the next game after being gunged in 'Liquid Gold'. Both teams were barefoot when they were gunged. This series saw host Barney Harwood absent for a few editions for some unknown reasons. Johny Pitts (of CBBC's Roar and Help! Teach Is Coming to Stay) was the official guest presenter filling in for Barney. Marcus Garvey who plays the Ugly Yeti had often been absence too. Special features in the series included 'Britain's Swaps Talent' where presenter Barney had to swap a talent of his with one of another person or two who performs a talent for him. Also the series included more comedy sketches featuring a wide range of characters, from Quiz Show Colin to Big Parrot, Little Pirate.

== Basil's Game Show ==
A spin-off to the main Saturday morning show, this show consisted of only the games and some comedy from the previous Saturday broadcast; this show did not feature any swaps, or the celebrity interviews.

== Dunk Beds ==
Dunk Beds was a regular game on the show, in which one member of a team had to push a bed along a track with each part of it scored depending on how far it went. If the contestants pushed too hard, the bed would fall into a pool of green gunge. George Sampson was a contestant on the game before he was known as a contestant on the second series of Britain's Got Talent. Winner of BBC's Election (CBBC) Quincy Washington was also on Basil's Swap Shop competing against George Sampson. It returned for series 2 under the name "Dunk Beds: Dunk Harder", with contestants pushing a bunk bed.

== Comedy Sketches ==
- What? Nothing!
- Graveyard of Terror
- Zeroes
- Serious Back Garden
- Disastermind
- Fox News
- Dinnerladies
- Fox's Den
- Brush v Brush Smackdown
- Agent 003 1/2
- At Home with the Vampires
- Snout to Nose with Basil and Barney
- Under the Sea
- Toilet Humour
- Just Basil
- Tea Break
- Barnabee and Bzzzl
- I Love...
- Big Parrot Little Pirate
- Nursery Grimes
- Barnstorming Barney
- Basil's Lets Get Quizzical/Quiz Show Colin

== Transmissions ==
Series	Start date	End date	Episodes
1	5 January 2008	29 March 2008	13
2	10 January 2009	28 March 2009	12
3	3 April 2010	25 September 2010	26
