= Michael Byers (actor) =

Northern Irish actor

- Born: Northern Ireland
- Education: University of St Andrews

Michael Byers is a Northern Irish actor, best known for his portrayal of Liam in The Basil Brush Show. Having graduated from the University of St Andrews, his first television appearance was as Brendan Shepherd in Hollyoaks, before playing a fairy named Storm in several episodes of The Mysti Show on CBBC. Michael was then cast as Liam in The Basil Brush Show in 2006, replacing Mr Stephen as the wise-cracking fox's sidekick and flatmate. Making his debut at the start of the fifth series, he has appeared in 26 episodes of the BAFTA-nominated show to date.

In 2007, he worked with critically acclaimed director Stephen Poliakoff, starring as artist Zach in the BBC One film Capturing Mary, alongside Dame Maggie Smith, David Walliams, and Ruth Wilson.

In 2022, Byers appeared as Officer Lennox in two episodes of the third season of the hit Channel 4 teen sitcom Derry Girls.

== Filmography ==
Year	Title	Role	Notes
2002–2003	Hollyoaks	Brendan Shepherd	3 episodes
2004	The Mysti Show	Storm	3 episodes
2006	The Message	Boyfriend	Episode: 1.1
2006–2007	The Basil Brush Show	Liam	26 episodes
2007	Capturing Mary	Zach	TV movie
2012	Holby City	Owen Maxwell	Episode: The Third Way
2013	Chuggington	Jackman (voice)	30 episodes
2014	Law & Order: UK	Robert Page	Episode: Repeat to Fade
2015	Doctors	Patch O'Hanlon	Episode: Boom Banger
2019	Doctors	Adam Lowry	Episode: Grasp the Thorn
2022	Derry Girls	Officer Lennox	Episode: 3.1 The Night Before
2022	Derry Girls	Officer Lennox	Episode: 3.7 The Agreement
2022	Hope Street (TV series)	Gregory Saunders	Episode: 2.2
2026	How To Get To Heaven From Belfast	Officer Carson	Episode: 1.7 Outlaws, Liars and Fallen Angels
