= Ajay Chhabra =

British actor

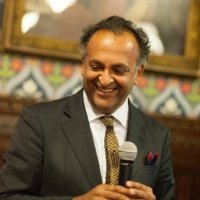
- Chhabra in 2015
- Born: 28 November 1970 (age 55); Greenwich, London, England
- Occupations: Actor, comedian, producer, theatre director
- Years active: 1998–present

Ajay Chhabra (born 28 November 1970) is a British television and theatre actor, director, producer and comedian of Indo-Fijian heritage, who is best known for playing Anil in The Basil Brush Show, The Vicar, Suresh Mattai in the BBC Radio series The Archers and the Defense Barrister George Karnad in Holby City. Ajay, and Simmy Gupta are co-Artistic Directors of Nutkhut, and founder of the London Mela (Europe's largest South Asian festival).

== Early life ==
Before turning professional he worked in the Hotel and Events sector. He studied Anthropology at Goldsmiths College, University of London and Hospitality Management at Westminster Hotel School and the University of North London. He trained at Grosvenor House Hotel and Beck Hotels in Austria, completing his training at the University of Innsbruck.

== Career ==
He created and played Stanley in Kafka's Dick by Alan Bennett and developed his own series Planet Ajay for the BBC, creating and playing four characters – himself, his evil twin brother, Badjay, a space serpent: Jaleel the Eel and his maternal grandmother, Naniji, using green screen technology.

In 1995 he made his West End debut in Indian Ink by Tom Stoppard alongside Felicity Kendal, Art Malik and the late Margaret Tyzack. He has worked for BBC Radio Drama reading works exclusively for V S Naipaul and Salman Rushdie.

From 2002 to 2007, he played Anil the café owner in the children's TV series The Basil Brush Show.

Come to Kochi, an 8 part series which Chhabra presented from the Southern Indian state of Kerala, is now taught as part of the National Curriculum.

He has directed and performed for Diesel Clothing Company in Italy, Greece, Holland, Germany and Denmark, bringing together fashion and theatre in creating a theatrical presentation of Spring/Summer collections with catwalk models, classical dancers and actors.

In 2011 he created and performed a virtual customer of the future for the Senior Executive board of HSBC bank in Canary Wharf, London and at its headquarters in Hong Kong, enabling senior directors to execute future customer account profiles.

As part of the centenary commemorations of the First World War, created by Chhabra, over 50,000 people experienced Dr Blighty at Brighton's Royal Pavilion Gardens. The projections spread far and wide on social media and were seen by over a million people online.

Dr Blighty threw a spotlight on the Indians who travelled across the world to fight for the Allies during the First World War. More than one million men travelled from India to fight in the Great War. The event successfully brought to life the experiences of the injured Indian soldiers sent to recuperate in Brighton and the locals who came to know and care for them.

Chhabra is a board member of The Independent Street Arts Network (ISAN) and a member of the Mayor of London Cultural Leadership Board.

== Filmography ==
=== Film ===
Year	Title	Role	Notes
2000	Second Generation	Talvin	
2002	Bend It Like Beckham	Party Guest	
2002	Anita and Me	Mr. Bhatra	
2003	The Audition	Sargent	Short film
2005	Project Huxley	Colin	Short film
2021	Tom and Jerry	Mr. Mehta	

=== Television ===
Year	Title	Role	Notes
1998, 2007	Casualty	Ravi Sangera; Felix Spencer	Episodes: "Internal Inferno: Part 1" "Sweet Charity"
1998	The Bill	Mr. Wadia	Episode: "Christmas Star"
2002–2007	The Basil Brush Show	Anil	
2003	Holby City	George Karnad	Episodes: "The One You Love: Part 1" "The One You Love: Part 2"
2005	Dream Team	Doctor	Episode: "The Hand That Rocks the Cradle"
2009	Planet Ajay	Ajay / Badjay / Naniji / Jaleel the Eel	
2012	Hunted	Pakistani Driver	Episode: "Khyber"
2016	Marcella	Shop Owner	Episode #1.1
2017	Hetty Feather	Deerheart	Episode: "Plans"
2017	Carters Get Rich	Waiter	Episode #1.2
2018	BBC3 Quickies (TV Mini-Series)	Dad	When You Disappoint Your Parents
2018	The Jewish Enquirer (TV Series)	Mike Geddis MP	Feathers & Foreskins
2019	Four Weddings and a Funeral (TV Series)	Rafik	Lights, Camera, Wedding
2020	Vera (TV Series)	Nasir Ali	Blood Will Tell
