= List of EastEnders characters introduced in 2018 =

EastEnders logo

EastEnders is a BBC soap opera that first aired on 19 February 1985. The following is a list of characters that first appeared in 2018, in order of first appearance. All characters are introduced by the show's executive consultant, John Yorke. Madhav Sharma and Indira Joshi made their first appearances in January as Arshad Ahmed and Mariam Ahmed, the uncle and aunt of Masood Ahmed (Nitin Ganatra). Halfway (Tony Clay), a friend of the Carter family, Ciara Maguire (Denise McCormack), the former wife of Aidan Maguire (Patrick Bergin), and Daisy (Amelie Smith), one of Arshad and Mariam's foster children, also debuted in January. Dan and Ashley (Ifan Meredith and Ashley Cook), Daisy's adoptive parents, Hunter Owen, the son of Mel Owen (Tamzin Outhwaite) and her dead husband Steve (Martin Kemp), Hayley Slater (Katie Jarvis), the cousin of Stacey Fowler (Lacey Turner), and Georgi (Holly Donovan) first appear in February. Mitch Baker (Roger Griffiths), Keegan Baker's (Zack Morris) father, and Harley, a foster child of Mariam and Arshad, debuts in March. Judith Thompson (Emma Fielding), the daughter of Ted Murray (Christopher Timothy) and Joyce Murray (Maggie Steed), and Harley's parents, Bijan (Jonas Khan) and Chloe (Lauren Fitzpatrick), appear in April. Henry (Andrew Alexander) also debuts in April. May sees the introductions of Stuart Highway (Ricky Champ), Halfway's brother, Umar Kazemi (Selva Rasalingam), the father of Kush Kazemi (Davood Ghadami) and Shakil Kazemi (Shaheen Jafargholi), and Darius Kazemi (Ash Rizi), Kush and Shakil's brother. Amal Hussain (Natasha Jayetileke) appears in June, while Jessica Jones (Tara Lee) made her first appearance in July. Adam Bateman (Stephen Rahman-Hughes) joins the cast in August and Marky (Niall O'Mara) also appears during the month. Ray Kelly (Sean Mahon), Zara Highway (Faye Daveney) and Bev Slater (Ashley McGuire) all debuted in September. Cherry Slater, the daughter of Hayley and Alfie Moon (Shane Richie), debuted in October, and in November, Evie Steele (Sophia Capasso) made her first appearance.

== Arshad Ahmed ==
Arshad Ahmed
- EastEnders character
- Portrayed by: Madhav Sharma
- Duration: 2018–2019
- First appearance: Episode 5628/5629; 1 January 2018
- Last appearance: Episode 6017; 1 November 2019
- Introduced by: John Yorke
In-universe information
- Occupation: Foster carer
- Wife: Mariam Ahmed
- Granddaughters: Iqra Ahmed; Habiba Ahmed
- Nephews: Masood Ahmed; AJ Ahmed; Inzamam Ahmed
- Other relatives: Syed Masood; Shabnam Masood; Tamwar Masood; Kamil Masood

Arshad Ahmed, played by Madhav Sharma, first appears in the episode broadcast on 1 January 2018, alongside his wife Mariam Ahmed (Indira Joshi). Arshad is the uncle of established character Masood Ahmed (Nitin Ganatra). Arshad's final scenes aired on 1 November 2019.

Masood drives Mariam and Arshad to Albert Square so they can move into number 41, which he owns. They are horrified to witness an armed robbery and shooting, and Mariam insists that they leave, so Masood and Arshad start taking things back to the van but are confused when Mariam disappears and then insists on staying. Masood attempts to ask Arshad and Mariam about setting a rent payment date, and Arshad lends Masood money. Mariam and Arshad's foster daughter, Daisy (Amelie Smith), moves in. Masood looks after her but when he leaves the room, she disappears. The police are contacted, and in the search for Daisy, Masood's ice cream van is found and he is forced to reveal his lack of success to his family. Ian Beale (Adam Woodyatt) finds Daisy and returns her to the Ahmeds, but delays taking her back because Masood joked to him that Arshad and Mariam religiously brainwash children. The police are unimpressed and a report has to be filed about Daisy's disappearance, which Masood worries will harm his family's fostering. Masood then moves back into his own home but Arshad insists that he pays them rent, so he is outraged that they will essentially be living there rent-free. Masood gets a job in The Vic but tells his family that he is an estate agent. Arshad soon finds out that Masood is working in The Queen Vic but promises not to tell Mariam. When Daisy is due to be adopted by Dan and Ashley (Ifan Meredith and Ashley Cook), Mariam admits to Arshad that she struggles when their foster children leave, and she wants to give up fostering. Daisy is adopted and Arshad and Mariam wonder what they will do next. Arshad witnesses an argument between Martin Fowler (James Bye) and Stacey Fowler (Lacey Turner) in front of their children and tells them off for their "child abuse". Mariam and Arshad then agree to emergency foster a two-year-old child who has been physically abused. They also foster a baby, Harley, whose mother is a heroin addict. Arshad struggles to settle him but soon realises that grime music works. Harley is tracked down by his birth parents, Bijan and Chloe (Jonas Khan and Lauren Fitzpatrick), and Arshad learns of their identity from social services when Bijan breaks in to vandalise their CCTV. Harley is kidnapped by Bijan, who hides out in the Ahmeds' house, and Chloe, but he is returned to the Ahmeds after persuasion from Rainie Branning (Tanya Franks).

When Honey Mitchell (Emma Barton) has toothache and unable to get an appointment with a dentist, Arshad arranges for Honey to see his foster son Adam Bateman (Stephen Rahman-Hughes) at a dental practice. After the appointment, Adam and Honey begin dating and Arshad suggests that Adam bring Honey and her children over for lunch one day to meet him and Miriam. However, Adam cheats on Honey with Arshad and Miriam's granddaughter Habiba Ahmed (Rukku Nahar) and Honey's ex-husband Billy Mitchell (Perry Fenwick) witnesses them kissing and tells Arshad and Miriam. Despite Arshad proclaiming that Billy is lying and letting his emotions over the end of his marriage interfere with the relationship, both he and Miriam are shaken by the revelation, especially as Habiba has had a crush on Adam before. Miriam suggests that Arshad ignore it and assures him that she will deal with Habiba personally. After Honey provides Arshad and Mariam with travel vouchers, the pair leave Walford for a pilgrimage to Pakistan.

On 3 October 2017, it was announced that Ganatra had reprised his role, having departed the soap in 2016. It was also confirmed that members of the character's family would be introduced. The character and Sharma's casting was announced on 15 November. Arshad and Mariam are foster carers and Arshad is billed as "jovial and with an air of mischief". Arshad and Mariam move to Albert Square, the show's setting, to rent Masood's house after agreeing it will allow them more room for their foster care. A show spokesperson said that the character's introduction is "certainly not the hassle free move they were expecting", adding that they will become embroiled in other character's drama instantly. Sharma expressed his delight at joining the show's cast and playing Arshad. John Yorke, the show's executive consultant, stated he was overjoyed to introduce more characters from Masood's family and promised "some incredibly challenging, fun and exciting stories ahead" for them. He also confirmed that more members of the family would be introduced. Following the characters' arrival, Daisy, one of their foster children, is introduced. Daisy goes missing upon her arrival and a "frantic search" is launched that could provide a "potentially devastating setback" for Arshad and Mariam.

== Mariam Ahmed ==
Mariam Ahmed
- EastEnders character
- Portrayed by: Indira Joshi
- Duration: 2018–2019
- First appearance: Episode 5628/5629; 1 January 2018
- Last appearance: Episode 6017; 1 November 2019
- Introduced by: John Yorke
In-universe information
- Occupation: Nurse; Foster carer
- Husband: Arshad Ahmed
- Granddaughters: Iqra Ahmed; Habiba Ahmed

Mariam Ahmed, played by Indira Joshi, first appears in the episode broadcast on 1 January 2018, alongside her husband Arshad Ahmed (Madhav Sharma). Mariam is the aunt of established character Masood Ahmed (Nitin Ganatra). Mariam's final scenes aired on 1 November 2019.

Masood drives Mariam and Arshad to Albert Square so they can move into number 41, which he owns. While driving there, Masood introduces them to Mick Carter (Danny Dyer), although he is occupied with a planned robbery and asks them to leave. Mariam and Arshad are horrified to witness the robbery and Mick being shot back in Albert Square, and Mariam insists that they leave. However, Mariam, a retired nurse, sees Linda Carter (Kellie Bright), Mick's wife, outside The Queen Victoria pub and treats Mick, who is refusing to go to hospital. Mariam then decides to stay. Mariam and Arshad's foster daughter, Daisy (Amelie Smith), arrives with her social worker and moves in. Masood looks after her but she goes missing when he leaves the room. The police are contacted, and in the search for Daisy, Masood's ice cream van is found and he is forced to reveal his lack of success to his family. Ian Beale (Adam Woodyatt) finds Daisy and returns her to the Ahmeds, but delays taking her back because Masood joked to him that Arshad and Mariam religiously brainwash children. The police are unimpressed and a report has to be filed about Daisy's disappearance, which Masood worries will harm his family's fostering. Masood then moves back into his own home but Arshad insists that he pays them rent, so he is outraged that they will essentially be living there rent-free. Masood gets a job in The Vic but tells his family that he is an estate agent. The truth soon emerges and Masood takes a job in the chip shop, where Robbie Jackson (Dean Gaffney) accidentally eats samosas made for Masood by Mariam. Masood tells Robbie he made them and Robbie asks him to make more, so Masood steals Mariam's recipe. When she catches him cooking, he tells her he has a date and is meeting the woman's family, so she cooks the samosas for him but she later catches Masood and Robbie referring to them as Masood's samosas. Masood then agrees to meet Noor (Goldy Notay) to keep Mariam happy, and after their date, he tells Mariam that he told Noor the truth about his life and Mariam offers to teach Masood her family recipes.

When Daisy is due to be adopted by Dan and Ashley (Ifan Meredith and Ashley Cook), Mariam admits to Arshad that she struggles when their foster children leave and she wants to give up fostering. Daisy is adopted and they wonder what to do if they do not foster. However, they agree to emergency foster a two-year-old child who has been physically abused. They also foster a baby, Harley, whose mother is a heroin addict.

When Honey Mitchell (Emma Barton) has toothache and unable to get an appointment with a dentist, Arshad arranges for Honey to see his foster son Adam Bateman (Stephen Rahman-Hughes) at a dental practise. After the appointment, Adam and Honey begin dating and Arshad suggests that Adam bring Honey and her children over for lunch one day to meet him and Miriam. However, Adam cheats on Honey with Arshad's and Miriam's granddaughter Habiba Ahmed (Rukku Nahar) and Honey's ex-husband Billy Mitchell (Perry Fenwick) witnesses them kissing and tells Arshad and Miriam. Despite Arshad proclaiming that Billy is lying and letting his emotions over the end of his marriage interfere with the relationship, both he and Miriam are shaken by the revelation, especially as Habiba has had a crush on Adam before. Miriam suggests that Arshad ignore it and assures him that she will deal with Habiba personally. Suspecting Habiba of having romantic plans with Adam, Miriam places her phone in the kitchen and teases Habiba about finding a man before pointing her to the kitchen, which allows Miriam to secretly see the text Habiba receives from Adam cancelling the plans, confirming her suspicions. Miriam then goes to Habiba's and her sister Iqra Ahmed's (Priya Davdra) restaurant where Adam and Honey are having their last-minute date and, without letting on what she knows, she talks to Iqra, who is annoyed by Iqra's constant absence, and later Adam and Honey, about helping Habiba find a potential husband. After Honey provides Mariam and Ahmed with travel vouchers, the pair leave Walford for a pilgrimage to Pakistan.

On 3 October 2017, it was announced that Ganatra had reprised his role, having departed the serial in 2016. It was also confirmed that members of the character's family would be introduced. The character and Joshi's casting was announced on 15 November. Mariam and Arshad are foster carers and Mariam is billed as a "fierce but warm" character who will become integrated within the community. Mariam and Arshad move to Albert Square, the show's setting, to rent Masood's house after agreeing it will allow them more room for their foster care. A show spokesperson said that the character's introduction is "certainly not the hassle free move they were expecting", adding that they will become embroiled in other character's drama instantly. Joshi expressed her delight at joining the show's cast and said she was "looking forward" to working with Sharma and Ganatra. John Yorke, the show's executive consultant, stated he was overjoyed to introduce more characters from Masood's family and promised "some incredibly challenging, fun and exciting stories ahead" for them. He also confirmed that more members of the family would be introduced. Following the characters' arrival, Daisy, one of their foster children, is introduced. Daisy goes missing upon her arrival and a "frantic search" is launched that could provide a "potentially devastating setback" for Arshad and Mariam.

After her first few episodes, Inside Soap warmed to Mariam and looked forward to more scenes including the character. Reporter Gary Gillatt said that Mariam has "tons of charisma".

== Callum Highway ==
Callum "Halfway" Highway, played by Tony Clay, first appears in the episode broadcast on 1 January 2018. Callum is introduced as a friend of the Carter family and a love interest for Whitney Carter (Shona McGarty). The character's introduction was not publicised beforehand. Halfway is a comedic character who is jovial, dopey and "happy-go-lucky". Callum's initial stint on the show focuses on his relationship with the Carter family and establishing a relationship with Whitney. The actor was only contracted for two months and Callum departs in the episode first broadcast on 16 February 2018. Afterwards, Clay was invited back to reprise his role and Callum returns two months later after serving in the army. His experience in the army and his relationship with Whitney are explored upon his return. Producers introduced Callum's brother, Stuart Highway (Ricky Champ), following his return. Callum and Stuart's relationship is portrayed as dark and Clay thought Stuart's introduction added another dimension to his character.

== Ciara Maguire ==
Ciara Maguire
- EastEnders character
- Portrayed by: Denise McCormack
- First appearance: Episode 5630/5631; 2 January 2018
- Last appearance: Episode 5652; 8 February 2018
- Introduced by: John Yorke
In-universe information
- Occupation: Career criminal
- Brothers: Ray Kelly
- Husband: Aidan Maguire (backstory)

Ciara Maguire, played by Denise McCormack, first appears in the episode broadcast on 2 January 2018. She is the former wife of Aidan Maguire (Patrick Bergin).

Ciara arrives following a robbery, and meets DCI Alsworth (Nik Drake) at the scene of the crime, telling him she staged the robbery as part of security training, and convinces Alsworth, who recognises her, to drop the investigation. Ciara sees a discarded cigar and realises Aidan was involved, and then calls her sister-in-law Mel Owen (Tamzin Outhwaite), telling her to pack a bag and come back to her old home. Ciara meets him at the funeral parlour, out of which he is doing business, and says she has worked out that he was involved. After Ciara leaves, Aidan tells Phil Mitchell (Steve McFadden) that he is taking back from Ciara what she took from him. Later, Ciara demands a share of the money that Aidan stole in exchange for not informing the police, and he gives her a key. When Ciara goes to meet Aidan at the address, he is not there, so she returns to the funeral parlour and meets Honey Mitchell (Emma Barton), who thinks she is a customer and takes her to The Queen Victoria public house to wait. Ciara overhears Honey on the phone to Billy Mitchell (Perry Fenwick) and works out that Aidan is at a church with Billy, so calls Aidan saying she knows where he is, even though does not, which causes Aidan to run when he hears police sirens.

Mel returns to Walford and works out that Ben Mitchell (Harry Reid) has Ciara's money, so calls her and follows Ben to the Port of Dover where she tries to get Ben to return the money as he could be in danger, but he refuses and he arrives in France; Ciara watches him. Mel later meets Ciara in a café and it is revealed that Ciara is keeping Mel's son, Hunter Owen (Charlie Winter), away from her and Mel asks where he is as they had a deal, but Ciara says that Ben did not have the money, so Mel starts to search for the money back in Walford. When Mel suspects Phil has the money, Sharon Mitchell (Letitia Dean) admits to Mel that she took it. Sharon offers Mel a share of the money in exchange for telling Ciara they cannot find it, to which Mel agrees but Ciara does not believe what they say. Ciara makes threats towards Sharon's son, Dennis Rickman (Bleu Landau), having obtained his mobile number, and threatens to tell Hunter the truth about his father, Steve Owen (Martin Kemp). Mel immediately tells Ciara that Sharon has the money, but Ciara reveals that Mel told her as soon as Sharon admitted it. Mel hands over the money to Ciara and Mel is reunited with Hunter. When Ciara discovers she does not have all the money, she tells Hunter that Steve died in a car explosion, not a heart attack as Mel claimed and was a villain who killed Saskia Duncan (Deborah Sheridan-Taylor).

On 2 January 2018, McCormack announced her casting in the show. David Brown of Radio Times suspected that Ciara would share a connection with Aidan as they share a surname. It was later confirmed that Ciara is the former wife of Aidan and they are both involved in criminal plans. The character is billed as "no-nonsense". Daniel Kilkelly of Digital Spy questioned whether she was also connected to returning character Mel Owen (Tamzin Outhwaite). McCormack confirmed she would only be in EastEnders for a short stint, but said she is grateful for the part and working on the show is "great".

== Apostolos Papadopolous ==
Apostolos Papadopolous
- EastEnders character
- Portrayed by: Tarrick Benham
- Duration: 2018, 2021
- First appearance: Episode 5634; 8 January 2018
- Last appearance: 7 May 2021
- Introduced by: John Yorke (2018); Jon Sen and Kate Oates (2021)
In-universe information
- Occupation: Businessman
- Father: Andonis Papadopolous
- Grandfathers: Mr Papadopolous
- First cousins: Nico Papadopolous

Apostolos Papadopolous, played by Tarrick Benham, originally appeared from 8 to 12 January 2018. He then appeared on 12 April 2021 on a recurring basis until 7 May 2021.

Apostolos is the son of Andonis Papadopolous and new owner of the launderette. Karen Taylor (Lorraine Stanley) sees him in the launderette and assumes he is an asylum seeker and tells him to go home, to which he reveals he is from Hampstead and throws her out after she asks for a job. However, Karen later phones him and puts on a posh accent to secure an interview the next day. He recognises her and is angry but she convinces him that she is the right person for the job. However, Karen discovers that Apostolos is still interviewing for the job, and he tells her that he did not offer her the job. Masood Ahmed (Nitin Ganatra) also applies for the job and Apostolos asks them to each clean half of the launderette, saying he will offer it to whoever does the best job. They argue and spill bleach, but later Masood says he was to blame so Apostolos offers Karen the job but only because an employment agency failed to send anyone. Three years later, Apostolos sacks Karen because he cannot afford to keep her on. He later offers Karen a financial arrangement. Karen assumes he means paying her to sleep with him, and confronts him about it publicly. Disgusted, Apostolos reveals that it was actually an extended redundancy package, which he then refuses to give her before leaving. He later appears again the following month when Karen is arrested for smashing up the laundrette and he gives her a job back when the residents intervene.

After the character appeared, Inside Soap said he should continue to appear, saying he should "ensure that Walford launderette runs like clockwork. Never mind cleaning our sheets—he can help get them dirty."

== Daisy ==
Daisy
- EastEnders character
- Portrayed by: Amelie Smith
- Duration: 2018–2019
- First appearance: Episode 5635; 9 January 2018
- Last appearance: Episode 6017; 1 November 2019
- Introduced by: John Yorke
In-universe information
- Adoptive father: Dan; Ashley; Arshad Ahmed (foster)
- Adoptive mother: Mariam Ahmed (foster)

Daisy, played by Amelie Smith, first appears in the episode broadcast on 9 January 2018. She is a foster child of Arshad Ahmed (Madhav Sharma) and Mariam Ahmed (Indira Joshi). In November 2017, it was announced that foster carers Mariam Ahmed and Arshad Ahmed would be introduced to the serial. Daisy is introduced as their foster child who goes missing following her arrival. When she is realised to be missing, a "frantic search" is launched that could be a "potentially devastating setback" for Arshad and Mariam. When Daisy is to be adopted, Mariam is "worried" for Daisy due to her "struggling" potential adoptive parents. Mariam is reassured Daisy will have "great parents", though saying an "emotional goodbye" to Daisy makes Mariam and Arshad question whether to give up fostering. Daisy appears in six episodes, departing in the episode broadcast on 9 February. The following year, Smith reprised the role for a cameo appearance and Daisy appeared in the episode broadcast on 1 November 2019, as part of Arshad and Mariam's departure from the series.

Six-year-old Daisy arrives with her social worker to Arshad and Mariam's house. Arshad and Mariam's nephew, Masood Ahmed (Nitin Ganatra), looks after her but he struggles to bond with her. When he leaves the room, she goes missing. The police are contacted and residents help search for her. Ian Beale (Adam Woodyatt) finds Daisy in his garden and hesitantly returns her to the Ahmeds due to Masood fooling Ian into believing that they religiously brainwash children. PC Anna Heckley (Harriet Green) informs the family she will have to file a report about Daisy's disappearance, and Masood worries that it will damage his family's fostering. Mariam watches a video from Daisy's potential adoptive fathers, Dan and Ashley (Ifan Meredith and Ashley Cook), and is unsure if they should be the ones to bring up Daisy. Dan and Ashley have dinner with the Ahmeds and Ashley admits to Arshad that Daisy could not settle during her stay with them, but Arshad reminds him of Daisy's past and her difficulty in trusting adults. Mariam decides to contact social services. Dan and Ashley visit the Ahmeds again with social worker Viktoria (Cathy Walker), who talks to Ashley about concerns he has raised. Ashley is committed to Daisy, but feels that as he works from home and Dan does not, he will be looking after her when she is off school, but Dan reassures Ashley that he will have his support and will take time off work. Mariam and Arshad allow Daisy to paint their gate to remember her. On the morning of Daisy's leaving, she screams and spits at Mariam but Mariam calms her down. Daisy leaves when Dan and Ashley collect her.

== Dan and Ashley ==
Dan and Ashley
- EastEnders character
- Portrayed by: Ifan Meredith (Dan); Ashley Cook (Ashley)
- Duration: 2018–2019
- First appearance: Episode 5650; 5 February 2018
- Last appearance: Episode 5653; 9 February 2018 (Dan); Episode 6017; 1 November 2019 (Ashley)
- Introduced by: John Yorke
In-universe information
- Adoptive daughters: Daisy

Dan, played by Ifan Meredith, and Ashley, played by Ashley Cook, are the adoptive parents of Daisy (Amelie Smith), a child in the foster care of Arshad Ahmed (Madhav Sharma) and Mariam Ahmed (Indira Joshi). Their adoption of Daisy makes Arshad and Mariam reconsider fostering in the future. The characters appear in three episodes from 5 February to 9 February 2018. The following year, Cook reprised the role for a cameo appearance and Ashley appeared in the episode broadcast on 1 November 2019, as part of Arshad and Mariam's departure from the series.

Dan and Ashley first appear when they have dinner with Arshad and Mariam after having Daisy stay with them for a night. Ashley admits to Arshad that Daisy would not settle during her stay with them, but Arshad reminds him of Daisy's past, as she finds it difficult to trust adults. Mariam decides to contact social services. Dan and Ashley visit the Ahmeds again with social worker Viktoria (Cathy Walker). Ashley says he is worried that because he works from home and Dan works in the City, he will be the one to look after Daisy when she is unwell or school is closed and he may end up resenting Dan. Dan says he has always wanted to start a family and promises to take time off work to help. Ashley says he wants to go ahead with the adoption and Viktoria says they can proceed. Dan and Ashley later collect Daisy from Arshad and Mariam and thank them for looking after her.

Laura-Jayne Tyler of Inside Soap liked the characters and wished they could become regular characters, saying, "If only they were living on the Square, so that we could go on their adoption journey with them."

== Hunter Owen ==
Hunter Owen
- EastEnders character
- Portrayed by: Charlie Winter
- Duration: 2018–2019
- First appearance: Episode 5651; 6 February 2018
- Last appearance: Episode 5992; 12 September 2019 (appearance); Episode 6021; 14 November 2019 (voice-over)
- Introduced by: John Yorke (2018); Jon Sen (2019)
- Spin-off appearances: EastEnders: The Podcast (2018)
In-universe information
- Father: Steve Owen
- Mother: Mel Owen
- Stepfather: Ray Kelly
- Grandfathers: Jeff Healy
- Grandmothers: Barbara Owen; Jane Healy
- Uncles: Alex Healy
- Aunts: Jackie Owen; Katie Healy

Hunter Owen, played by Charlie Winter, first appears in the episode broadcast on 6 February 2018. He is introduced as the teenage son of Mel Owen (Tamzin Outhwaite) and her dead husband Steve (Martin Kemp). Winter's initial final scenes as Owen aired on 12 April 2019. On 5 June 2019, it was announced that Hunter would return in the summer for a short stint. He returned on 23 August. Hunter died on 6 September after being shot by a police marksman in the middle of Albert Square. Hunter made his final appearance on 12 September 2019 after Mel identifies his body.

Following Steve's death in a car explosion, Mel is arrested when she is implicated in Steve's drug smuggling; however, Steve's nemesis Phil Mitchell (Steve McFadden) agrees to bail her when he finds out she is pregnant. Mel later moves to Portugal before giving birth to Hunter. 15 years later, in January 2018, Mel returns to Walford to track down money stolen from her sister-in-law Ciara Maguire (Denise McCormack) and Ciara is keeping Hunter away from Mel until the money is recovered. When Ciara finds out Phil's wife Sharon Mitchell (Letitia Dean) took the money, Mel hands over the money to Ciara and Mel is reunited with Hunter, but when the money is not all recovered, Hunter is told the truth about Steve and his death: he died in a car explosion, not a heart attack, and killed Saskia Duncan (Deborah Sheridan-Taylor). Mel explains the circumstances of Saskia's death, how Steve incriminated his former employee Matthew Rose (Joe Absolom) for the crime and his death was a result of a car chase involving Phil's daughter Louise Mitchell (Tilly Keeper, but Rachel Cox at the time) – though she covers up Phil's involvement. Mel later compares Hunter to Steve and asks for them to start again. Hunter is pleased when Mel decides to remain in Walford and reopen the club that once belonged to Steve and Mel keeps the club as E20 for Hunter in tribute to Steve. Hunter claims he has no romantic interest in Louise when Tiffany Butcher (Maisie Smith) attempts to matchmake them, but Hunter later kisses Louise. Hunter stops Mel from going to Paris with Jack by removing a piece from his car engine, which Phil subtly advised him to do. Jack accidentally punches Hunter when he argues with Phil. At a Mitchell family dinner, a drunken Sharon reveals Phil as Steve's killer, but is seemingly left satisfied by Phil's explanation that the car explosion was not his fault. Louise decides she is ready to have sex with Hunter, but he keeps ignoring her until she confronts him, where she talks about her scars and sex and Hunter reassures Louise he will wait. Hunter persuades Phil to link up the club's CCTV to his phone on the opening night and prior to the opening, he and Louise have sex, with Hunter winking at the CCTV beforehand. Phil is enraged when he watches the CCTV and threatens to attack Hunter with a baseball bat as Hunter and Louise insist that the sex was consensual. Mel seduces and stands up to Phil to stop him from pursuing revenge against Hunter.

After Shakil Kazemi (Shaheen Jafargholi) dies from being stabbed, the teenagers spend time at E20 and they later find out money was stolen from the club. Louise breaks up with Hunter after finding out he sent a text reading 'I know what you did' to Louise and the other teenagers. Hunter injures himself, claiming Jack Branning (Scott Maslen), who is romantically involved with Mel, was responsible, but Mel changes her mind on believing him when Jack and Louise convince her Hunter is lying; Louise and Keegan also tell Mel and Jack respectively that Hunter took the money. After Jack feels Mel is too lenient towards Hunter, Hunter is forced to get a job and Ian takes him on to reconcile with Mel. Hunter uses Ian's plan to get away with trouble; however, after urging by his friends, Ian eventually sacks Hunter for not doing any work.

When Hunter sees Mel being attacked by her new husband Ray Kelly (Sean Mahon), he kills him by shooting Ray dead. When Jack finds out, he tells the police. Hunter confesses to the crime, and is sent to prison. Months later, he escapes. This prompts Mel to keep him from being discovered by letting him stay in an abandoned flat she owns. The pair later plan to escape, but Mel is distracted when Lisa unexpectedly appears and the two discuss their shared plan of fleeing Walford with Hunter and Louise. However, their conversation causes Hunter to seek out Jack on his own – taking Mel's gun with him in the process. When he infiltrates The Queen Victoria public house, Hunter finds Jack and holds him – alongside several others – at gunpoint. He begins to force Jack to leave with him discreetly, but Hunter is quickly recognised – prompting him to instigate a siege by holding the punters hostage at gunpoint. When Jack attempts to get the gun off Hunter, Hunter ends up shooting Phil's son Ben Mitchell (Max Bowden). By then, Lisa and Mel learn of Hunter's situation and end up becoming his hostages as well – with Mel unsuccessfully pleading with Hunter to stop the siege. Hunter eventually takes a pregnant Louise outside and demands that he is given a car, otherwise he will kill her. When Louise's boyfriend Keanu Taylor (Danny Walters) tries to rescue Louise, Hunter shoots him in response. He then aims the gun at Louise, but she is saved when the police shoot Hunter – killing him. A distraught Mel rushes to her son and cradles him in her arms, mourning the loss of her only child.

On 23 October 2017, it was announced that Outhwaite would be returning to the serial after a sixteen-year absence. On 21 December 2017, the character and casting were announced. Hunter is fifteen years old and billed as "charming and charismatic" and similar to Steve, whose "sinister tendencies" he shares. However, Hunter also has good characteristics. Outhwaite described Hunter as "gorgeous and brilliant" and stated that his relationship with Mel is "fraught". She also said that all characters, male and female, would be attracted to Hunter. Hunter arrives in Walford, the show's setting, following Mel's return. Winter expressed his delight at joining the show, describing the experience as "really surreal". The actor commented, "It's an exciting time for me and I [cannot] wait to get stuck in and for everyone to meet Hunter."

Before the character's arrival, the Metro reported that Hunter could provide some happiness for Louise, with the pair knowing each other through Mel's friendship with Louise's mother, Lisa Fowler (Lucy Benjamin). Hunter and Louise are already "firm friends", but their relationship could develop as Hunter may "be the one to change Louise's view of romance and make her smile again." Laura-Jayne Tyler of Inside Soap thought that Winter looks like Kemp and praised the casting department for their work on casting Winter. In 2021, Hollyoaks actor Billy Price revealed that he auditioned for the role of Hunter, and made it "quite far down" into the audition process.

In July 2018, Winter was longlisted in the "Best Bad Boy" category at Inside Soap Awards.

== Hayley Slater ==
Hayley Slater
- EastEnders character
- Portrayed by: Katie Jarvis
- Duration: 2018–2019
- First appearance: Episode 5653; 9 February 2018
- Last appearance: Episode 5864; 8 February 2019
- Introduced by: John Yorke
- Spin-off appearances: EastEnders: The Podcast (2018)
In-universe information
- Occupation: Handler of stolen goods
- Family: Slater
- Mother: Bev Slater
- Daughters: Cherry Slater
- Grandmothers: Violet Slater
- Uncles: Brian Slater
- First cousins: Sean Slater; Stacey Slater
- Other relatives: Charlie Slater; Harry Slater; Lynne Hobbs; Kat Slater; Belinda Peacock; Little Mo Mitchell; Zoe Slater; Lily Slater

Hayley Slater, played by Katie Jarvis, first appears in the episode broadcast on 9 February 2018. She is a relative of well-established characters Stacey (Lacey Turner) and Kat Slater (Jessie Wallace). The character last appears on 8 February 2019; on 28 March 2019 it was confirmed that Hayley would not be returning to the show.

Hayley is first seen taking photos of Stacey and her husband, Martin Fowler (James Bye). In the café, she looks through the photos and answers a phone call, asking if they received photos. She insults Martin to the caller, reassuring them that she knows what to do next. Hayley introduces herself to Martin at his stall and helps herself to an apple. Later in the café, Hayley distracts Martin when he is looking after his daughter, Hope Fowler, and Stacey catches Hayley kissing Martin. In Martin's absence, Hayley whispers to Stacey who she is when she asks. Stacey does not want Hayley around her, but she later gets in touch with Hayley and asks what she wants. Martin meets up with Hayley when he is looking after Hope and his stepson, Arthur Fowler (Hunter Bell) and Hayley encourages Martin to keep the children out for longer, disobeying Stacey's instructions. Hayley pretends to defend Martin in front of Stacey when she collects Arthur and Hope with police presence due to Martin not returning them. Later, Hayley visits Stacey and warns her not to soften towards Martin when she feels guilty as they are cousins and Slaters. Hayley later arrives in Walford again shortly after her family's return to ask Kat's grandmother Mo Harris (Laila Morse) for her share of money from the sale of SIM cards. When Hayley demands her money, Kat forcibly orders her to leave Walford. After spending the night sleeping rough, Stacey's mother, Jean Slater (Gillian Wright), invites Hayley around to the Slaters and Hayley opens up to Jean about her upbringing and being excluded from the family. Hayley is barred from The Queen Victoria from the landlady Linda Carter (Kellie Bright) when she sleeps in bed with her husband Mick Carter (Danny Dyer) after being paid by Stuart Highway (Ricky Champ). Martin discovers Hayley and Stacey are related and that Hayley does not have a son, but she later conceals her pregnancy. Hayley befriends a homeless girl, Brianna (Rina Diamond), who steals money from Hayley that she conned out of a man, Craig (Nigel Betts), by not going through with selling herself for sex. Craig motivates Hayley to contact her baby's father and she meets up with Kat's estranged husband, Alfie Moon (Shane Richie), informing him that he is the father of her child, but he does not want Hayley's child. After missing her earlier appointment for an abortion, Hayley cancels it and decides to keep her baby.

When the family receive the late Charlie Slater's (Derek Martin) taxi cab, they decide to sell it, but Hayley fixes it to use it for fares. Hayley is caught using it illegally by a police officer, who urges her to get a valid licence, but Hayley gives up on becoming a taxi driver due to the length of the process. Hayley confides in Jean about being pregnant after the lack of trust towards her to look after Hope and Jean insists that the father shares responsibility. Jean sets up a meeting between Hayley and Dave (Will Rastall), a married man Hayley had an affair with and who Jean assumes is the father. Stacey finds out Hayley is pregnant when she interrupts Jean adjusting Hayley's clothes and Stacey demands to know if Martin is the father; after denying Martin is the father and snapping, Hayley decides to leave. Jean announces Hayley's pregnancy to the family in order to prevent Hayley from leaving and despite initial anger towards Jean, Hayley changes her mind when the family throw a baby shower for her. Hayley is unhappy when Jean orchestrates a reunion with her mother, Bev Slater (Ashley McGuire). Bev lies to Hayley about a changed positive lifestyle, but Hayley is angered by Bev's suggestion of blackmailing Alfie and further angered when Bev goes through her belongings. Hayley and Bev argue and berate each other, with Bev leaving Hayley when she bleeds. Upon Jean working out Alfie is the baby's father, Hayley goes onto the balcony of her family's old flat whilst drinking, but is talked down by Jean. Kat calls social services, who offer Hayley support.

On Halloween, Hayley goes into labour and decides to drive herself out of Walford but the taxi cab breaks down and Hayley is forced to give birth in a crack den and passes out shortly after; Kat and Keanu find Hayley and her daughter. Despite Kat and Jean's support, Hayley struggles to adapt to family life and runs away from home several times. Bev tries to sell Hayley's baby, but Kat intervenes, strengthening their bond. Just as Hayley is adjusting to life as a mother, Alfie returns and reconciles with Kat. He is stunned to realise that Hayley did not abort his child, and insists they keep the truth hidden from Kat. Hayley develops feelings for him when she sees him bond with their daughter, named Cherry by Alfie after his deceased mother. On Christmas Eve, Stacey witnesses Hayley kiss Alfie. She is horrified to uncover Cherry's paternity and issues an ultimatum: one of them goes, or Kat learns the truth. Hayley decides to go, but her parting gift to Alfie – a lock of Cherry's hair – is discovered by Kat and she works out the truth. After a furious showdown, Alfie turns nasty with Kat, who accuses him of taking advantage of Hayley's vulnerability. Hayley defends Kat and pushes Alfie down the stairs, seemingly killing him. However, as they discuss what to do, they discover Alfie survived the fall and has left with Cherry. Kat convinces Alfie to return with Cherry which he does. After realising that Hayley is not coping, Kat suggests that she and Alfie look after Cherry. After she attempts suicide by stepping out in front of a minibus driven by Keanu, she tries to stab herself with a screwdriver and is then admitted to a psychiatric hospital. She later flees from the hospital, leaving only a note saying sorry to Kat. In 2020, it is revealed that during the COVID-19 pandemic lockdown, Kat returned Cherry to Hayley.

=== Development ===
On 22 December 2017, executive consultant John Yorke announced a new member of the Slater family would be introduced into EastEnders among the returning Slaters, to "sort Stacey out" after her big 2018 storyline. Hayley's connection to the Slater family was not immediately revealed upon the character's debut, but it was announced that she would be involved in "a brand new mystery" for Martin. Duncan Lindsey, writing for the Metro, suggested that Hayley could be connected to the Slater family, either helping Stacey fight against her estranged husband Martin or a new family member. The reporter also suggested that Hayley could be acquainted with Martin's former stalker, Sarah Cairns (Alison Pargeter). It was reported that Hayley would not be friends with Martin, who will have to "watch his back" throughout his custody battle with Stacey. The character was revealed as Stacey's cousin in her third episode. Of her casting, Jarvis said that she is "really excited to join a team of such lovely, talented people and become part of such an iconic show" and loves being a part of the Slater family, commenting that it is "going to be so much fun and I cannot wait to see what's in store for Hayley."

It was reported Hayley would have a "horror [...] ordeal" around Halloween as she will be alone as she gives birth, which is described as a "terrifying twist" and leaves Hayley "panic stricken." Hayley's anxiety also increases under the pressure of keeping the secret about the baby's paternity and her plan to "attempt to do a runner" is stopped when she goes into labour, putting her and her baby in a "worrying situation". Following the birth, Hayley, described as "struggling" and "overwhelmed", abandons her baby with foster carers Mariam and Arshad; however, her baby suffering a "scare" reportedly makes Hayley "rise to her responsibilities" and "reevaluate her earlier decision to give up her child."

In July 2018, Jarvis was longlisted for the "Best Newcomer", "Best Bad Girl" and "Best Shock Twist" awards at the Inside Soap Awards. For her portrayal of Hayley, Jarvis was nominated for Best Soap Newcomer at the 2018 Digital Spy Reader Awards; she came in third place with 13.2% of the total votes. Alfie being revealed as the father of Hayley's baby was nominated for Biggest OMG Soap moment; it came in fifth place with 8.3% of the total votes.

On 28 March 2019, it was confirmed that Jarvis had left the show and that there were no immediate plans for her to return, though her last episode was on 8 February 2019.

== Magic Marv ==
Magic Marv
- EastEnders character
- Portrayed by: Steve Steen
- Appears in: Episode 5658; 20 February 2018
- Introduced by: John Yorke
In-universe information
- Occupation: Children's entertainer

Magic Marv, played by Steve Steen, appears in the episode broadcast on 20 February 2018.

Magic Marv is a children's television performer. Tina Carter (Luisa Bradshaw-White) meets him when she is hungover and he reveals the details of the night before when they got drunk and got tattoos of Peter Pan. Tina is shocked by her own behaviour especially as she used to watch Magic Marv on TV when her daughter, Zsa Zsa Carter (Emer Kenny) was a child. Marv then puts on a show at the community centre but he appears drunk and everyone is shocked at how poor his performance is. He calls Stacey Fowler (Lacey Turner) a "yummy mummy" and refers to her as "Sally", insults Martin Fowler (James Bye), and makes comments about Kush Kazemi (Davood Ghadami) being the father of Arthur Fowler (Hunter Bell), who Stacey and Martin have brought to the show. During the interval, Martin finds Marv in the pub and tells him off for drinking and gets angry when he calls Stacey "Sally" again. When the show continues, he gets Kush and Martin on the stage to sing but sends Martin off when he does badly. Marv makes another comment about Stacey and Kush, so Martin knocks Marv's hat off and stamps on one of his drums.

David Brown of the Radio Times described Magic Marv as "a drunk, shambling mess who insults the dads and ineptly flirts with the mums!" Laura-Jayne Tyler of Inside Soap disliked the character and felt that Martin and Stacey's reactions to him resembled that of the audience.

== Georgi ==
Georgi
- EastEnders character
- Portrayed by: Holly Donovan
- First appearance: Episode 5658; 20 February 2018
- Last appearance: Episode 5660; 22 February 2018
- Introduced by: John Yorke
In-universe information
- Mother: Tilly

Georgi, played by Holly Donovan, first appears in the episode broadcast on 20 February 2018. She is a friend of Zsa Zsa Carter (Emer Kenny), who is Tina Carter's (Luisa Bradshaw-White) daughter.

When pregnant Georgi is in the café, she becomes breathless and Tina helps her. Georgi later meets Tina's sister Shirley Carter (Linda Henry) in The Queen Victoria pub, and Shirley gives her £100 cash and offers to meet her later. When Georgi nearly falls into a table, Tina tries to help her again but Georgi realises she is Zsa Zsa's mother and tells her not to give her any advice as she was a bad mother to Zsa Zsa. Georgi tells Tina that she does not have a good relationship with her mother and Tina tries to encourage Georgi to reach out to her mother. Georgi is furious that Tina met up with her mother, Tilly (Jacqueline Roberts), and disclosed where she is, which also infuriates Shirley. Georgi goes into labour and despite Georgi rejecting her, Tina helps Georgi give birth to her son and reassures her that she will be a good mother.

The character of Georgi was announced in February 2018. It was reported that Georgi is already familiar with Tina's sister Shirley and Tina is "alarmed" that Georgi and Zsa Zsa are friends while Georgi is unhappy that Tina is Zsa Zsa's mother. It was also said that Georgi's arrival changes Tina's choice to "reevaluate the state of her life", but the "unpleasant surprise" of Zsa Zsa asking Shirley to help Georgi on her behalf forces Tina to "think about the current state of her relationship" with Zsa Zsa. Tina unintentionally makes thing "a whole lot more complicated" for Georgi when Tina attempts to fix Georgi's relationship with her mother, but gives away Georgi's location.

Laura-Jayne Tyler of Inside Soap called Georgi a "pregnant Walford waif" and believed that producers originally planned for Zsa Zsa to appear, but when Kenny declined a return, they introduced Georgi. Tyler questioned why they did not recast Zsa Zsa and felt that Georgi's appearance was "so random".

== Mitch Baker ==
Mitch Baker
- EastEnders character
- Portrayed by: Roger Griffiths
- Duration: 2018–2023
- First appearance: Episode 5670; 12 March 2018
- Last appearance: Episode 6826; 25 December 2023
- Introduced by: John Yorke (2018); Jon Sen (2019)
In-universe information
- Occupation: Builder; Barber; Taxi driver
- Father: Tony Baker
- Brothers: Avery Baker
- Wife: Marla Baker (until 2018)
- Sons: Keegan Baker
- Daughters: Chantelle Atkins; Bailey Baker
- Grandsons: Mackenzie Atkins
- Granddaughters: Mia Atkins
- Nephews: Felix Baker; Finlay Baker (adoptive)

Mitch Baker, played by Roger Griffiths, first appears in episode 5670, first broadcast on 12 March 2018. Mitch is the father of established character Keegan Baker (Zack Morris) and the former boyfriend of Karen Taylor (Lorraine Stanley). After appearing in six episodes across two stints, Mitch departs in episode 5679, first broadcast on 27 March. Eight months later, it was announced that Mitch would return again. Mitch was reintroduced as a regular character in 2019 by incoming senior executive producer Kate Oates, and executive producer Jon Sen. He returned with his daughter Chantelle Atkins (Jessica Plummer).

Mitch arrives on Albert Square and reunites with Keanu Taylor (Danny Walters), the half-brother of his daughter Chantelle and son Keegan. Keanu undertakes work on Mitch's van and warns him to keep away from his family, lying that they do not live on Albert Square. Mitch leaves without paying so later returns, having followed Keanu to his house. Mitch shouts for Karen and Keegan at the flat, but Keanu punches him. Keegan is shocked to see him. The next day, Mitch flirts with Karen at the launderette where she works and they talk about how Mitch helped raise Keanu but then left when Keegan was born, then later took on her other children but left again five years previously. He insists he has changed and wants to settle down. When Karen brings Mitch home, Keegan, Keanu and their half-sister, Bernadette Taylor (Clair Norris), are against him being there and he leaves when Keegan insists, but Karen later sneaks him into the flat.

Keanu is angry when he finds out Mitch stayed the night, while Bernadette and Keegan are happy to have him there, and Keanu decides to move out and stay with a friend. Mitch urges Karen to tell Keanu the truth about his own father, but when Karen tries, Keanu walks away. Keegan then overhears Karen and Mitch agreeing not to tell Keanu that his father received a 12-year prison sentence for attempting to kill Karen. The next day, Keegan mentions that he heard them talking, so Mitch explains what happened. Mitch asks Keegan to convince Keanu to move back home, which he does. While sitting with the family, Mitch receives a text message asking where he is. Mitch agrees to walk the family dog, Bronson, and finds him chewing an envelope of money, which Patrick Trueman (Rudolph Walker) has posted for the Taylors' upstairs neighbours, Ted Murray (Christopher Timothy) and Joyce Murray (Maggie Steed). Mitch says this was his fate and leaves with the money.

When Keegan is suspended from school for three days, Mitch invites Keegan's headteacher, Mrs Robyn Lund (Polly Highton), to the flat, who gets Keegan to apologise and she reduces his suspension to one day. Karen is annoyed when she hears about Keegan's suspension and Mitch's interference, but Keegan wants them to get along. When Mitch goes to see Karen, he breaks up with his wife over the phone and removes his wedding ring. His wife Marla (Elicia Daly), arrives on Albert Square to see Karen as she wants Mitch back, announcing she is pregnant and both Karen and Marla confront Mitch. When Mitch returns to Marla, she reveals she is not pregnant.

The character and Griffiths' casting details were announced on 26 February 2018. Griffiths previously appeared in the role of D.I. Christopher Riddick from 2004 to 2005. He said "coming in as Mitch – the wild card – meant I had to hit the ground running." Mitch shows up at The Arches when his van breaks down, but his "shifty behaviour" makes it clear that his arrival is not a coincidence. The character left Walford during the episode broadcast on 16 March, but it was confirmed by Sophie Dainty of Digital Spy that he had not made his final appearance. Mitch returned in the episode broadcast on 26 March, and departed again in the following episode, broadcast on 27 March. Laura-Jayne Tyler of Inside Soap liked Mitch, writing, "We think EastEnders is on to a winner with Keegan's charming-but-edgy dad, Mitch. He's very watchable." On 12 November 2018, it was announced that Griffiths had reprised the role and Mitch would return in late 2018. Bea Mitchell of Digital Spy billed the return as "dramatic" and reported that Mitch would cause more trouble for the Taylor family. On his return, Griffiths commented, "It feels great to be returning to Albert Square and working with the wonderful cast and crew again, especially the fantastic Taylor family. I'm excited for the viewers to learn more about Mitch and see what trouble he gets himself into this time."

The character made an unannounced departure from the show on 8 December 2023.

== Harley ==
Harley
- EastEnders character
- First appearance: Episode 5674; 19 March 2018
- Last appearance: Episode 5799; 23 October 2018
- Introduced by: John Yorke
In-universe information
- Father: Bijan
- Mother: Chloe
- Adoptive father: Arshad Ahmed (foster)
- Adoptive mother: Mariam Ahmed (foster)

Harley first appears in the episode broadcast on 19 March 2018. He is a foster child of Arshad Ahmed (Madhav Sharma) and Mariam Ahmed (Indira Joshi).

Mariam arrives home with Harley and a social worker, telling Arshad that they have been asked to foster him. Arshad and his nephew, Masood Ahmed (Nitin Ganatra) struggle to settle Harley due to the possibility he is addicted to heroin through his birth mother, but Karen Tayor (Lorraine Stanley) helps them to realise that grime music helps settle him. Harley's father Bijan (Jonas Khan) tracks Harley down from a selfie taken by Tiffany Butcher (Maisie Smith) of her with Harley and informs Harley's mother, Chloe (Lauren Fitzpatrick). Chloe is reunited with Harley when she pretends to Arshad she has been the victim of a mugging. Bijan kidnaps Harley shortly afterwards, but they are eventually arrested and Harley is returned to the Ahmeds. In October 2018, Chloe arrives at the Ahmeds to collect Harley and Chloe is given a book by the Ahmeds of Harley during his stay with them.

On 13 March 2018, it was reported that Harley would present a "big new challenge" for the Ahmeds upon his arrival, especially as Harley will be in their care for the "foreseeable future." Harley is described as a "handful" who "won't settle", something that is feared by the family and Arshad finds himself "struggling to care" for Harley, causing him to become frustrated. It was reported that Karen would be a "surprising" help for the Ahmeds with Harley. It was later reported that the arrival of Harley's birth mother, Chloe, presents the Ahmed family with a "nightmare" when she kidnaps Harley.

== Judith Thompson ==
Judith Thompson
- EastEnders character
- Portrayed by: Emma Fielding
- First appearance: Episode 5683; 3 April 2018
- Last appearance: Episode 5686; 6 April 2018
- Introduced by: John Yorke
In-universe information
- Father: Ted Murray
- Mother: Joyce Murray
- Brothers: Alan Murray
- Sisters: Barbara
- Husband: Freddie Thompson
- Sons: Toby Thompson
- Daughters: Harriet Thompson

Judith Thompson, played by Emma Fielding, appears in the series between 3 and 6 April 2018. She is the daughter of Ted Murray (Christopher Timothy) and Joyce Murray (Maggie Steed).

Judith arrives in Walford when Ted contacts following Joyce's death. She sorts through Joyce's belongings and is upset when she finds out that Ted did not inform her and Alan of Joyce's death for three days. She reluctantly gives Ted an update on how her children are and later meets Ted and Joyce's neighbours, including Bernadette Taylor (Clair Norris), who Ted has been teaching chess to. Ted decides he wants to show Judith off to the neighbours so takes her to the café, where he sits with Bernadette to play chess. Judith loses her temper, berating him as a father and a husband. Judith later calls someone, saying she wants Ted to be put in a care home. Judith later mentions this to Bernadette, who informs Ted. Ted confronts her, saying that she is doing it as she is unhappy with her husband, Freddie, something he warned her about prior to their marriage. Judith leaves after Bernadette and Karen insist they will look after Ted.

Upon her arrival, David Brown from the Radio Times said that "long-standing family tensions" in the Murray family "rise to the surface" as it becomes apparent that Judith does not "hold [Ted] in high regard." Judith is jealous of the "parental affection" she witnesses Ted giving Bernadette Taylor (Clair Norris) through "obvious pride and affection" from their shared interest in chess. A writer from TV Times believed that Judith sounded like a "right cow", calling her "devious" and having "as much warmth as a fridge freezer".

== Bijan and Chloe ==
Bijan and Chloe
- EastEnders character
- Portrayed by: Jonas Khan (Bijan); Lauren Fitzpatrick (Chloe)
- First appearance: Episode 5693; 20 April 2018 (Bijan); Episode 5694; 23 April 2018 (Chloe)
- Last appearance: Episode 5696; 26 April 2018 (Bijan); Episode 5799; 23 October 2018 (Chloe)
- Introduced by: John Yorke
In-universe information
- Sons: Harley

Bijan, played by Jonas Khan, and Chloe, played by Lauren Fitzpatrick, are the parents of Harley, who is being fostered by Arshad Ahmed (Madhav Sharma) and Mariam Ahmed (Indira Joshi). Bijan appears between episode 5693, first broadcast on 20 April 2018, and episode 5696, first broadcast on 26 April. Chloe appears between episode 5694, first broadcast on 23 April 2018, and episode 5696, although she makes an appearance in episode 5799, originally broadcast on 23 October 2018.

Bijan arrives in Walford to track down Harley after Tiffany Butcher (Maisie Smith) posts a selfie online of her and Harley on social media. He tries to find Tiffany by telling Donna Yates (Lisa Hammond) that she is his girlfriend, and Donna reveals she is still a child. Bijan sees Harley with Mariam and phones Chloe, informing her that Harley is fine. Chloe arrives and tells Arshad that she has been mugged. Arshad invites her to his home and she is reunited with Harley. She sees they have CCTV set up, and in the night, Bijan vandalises it. Social services visit because of this and Arshad discovers Chloe's true identity from a photo. The social worker reveals that Bijan has been in prison for domestic violence, drug dealing and kidnapping. Arshad and his nephew, Masood Ahmed (Nitin Ganatra), secure the house but Bijan is already hiding inside. He kidnaps Harley during the night and the police are called. Bijan and Chloe struggle to escape from Walford when the car breaks down so they hide at the car lot where Bijan has assaulted Max Branning (Jake Wood). Chloe suffers from withdrawal symptoms, but Bijan says her drugs are in the car; Max gives him the keys to another car and he hides there until the police are gone. Meanwhile, Max's wife, Rainie Branning (Tanya Franks), a former drug addict, asks Chloe if she can keep Harley safe. When Bijan drives the car up to the office, Chloe enters the car without Harley and Bijan says they have wasted their time. Max shouts to the police and Bijan drives away at speed. Bijan and Chloe are later arrested and Harley is returned to the Ahmeds. Six months later, Chloe has turned her life around and Harley is allowed to be returned to him. She arrives at the Ahmeds to collect Harley and gives struggling expectant mother Hayley Slater (Katie Jarvis) advice. Chloe is given a book by the Ahmeds of Harley during his stay with them and she asks if Harley can visit in the future.

Bijan was described by Duncan Lindsay from the Metro as "mysterious", and Sophie Dainty from Digital Spy reported that Bijan's arrival would "kick off an intriguing new storyline." Chloe's introduction was reported by Lindsay, who said she is "clearly on a mission". It was reported that Chloe would present the Ahmed family with a "nightmare" when she kidnaps Harley, commencing a "frantic" search.

== Henry ==
Henry
- EastEnders character
- Portrayed by: Andrew Alexander
- First appearance: Episode 5698; 30 April 2018
- Last appearance: Episode 5699; 1 May 2018
- Introduced by: John Yorke

Henry, played by Andrew Alexander, first appears on 30 April 2018. He brings his car to the local garage and asks Keanu Taylor (Danny Walters) to repair it and gives him money, asking Keanu to call him a cab. He is rude towards Keanu and when he returns later, Keanu explains that the parts need to be ordered. Sharon Mitchell (Letitia Dean) tells Henry to go elsewhere, so he asks for his money back, but Sharon says he should behave in a more civilised manner. Henry then drives his car away after telling Sharon to keep the cash and he will look her up when he comes back. Sharon and Keanu realise they still have his spare keys and know where he lives, so they steal his car and plan to put it into storage and rack up speeding fines. The next day, Henry returns and meets Phil Mitchell (Steve McFadden), accusing him, Keanu or Sharon of stealing his car. Phil tells him he must have lost his keys. Phil then finds out what happened from Sharon, and Keanu brings back Henry's car, then they leave it at Max Branning's (Jake Wood) car lot so they can falsely accuse Max of the theft. However, Max and his wife, Rainie Branning (Tanya Franks) realise they are being set up and have the car removed and sold.

An EastEnders source told Inside Soap's Tom Spilsbury that Henry "dislikes dealing with Keanu" and "rudely patronises Sharon after she offers her assistance", saying that she does not like his "casual sexism" and decides to "teach him a lesson".

== Stuart Highway ==
Stuart Highway
- EastEnders character
- Portrayed by: Ricky Champ
- Duration: 2018–2022, 2025
- First appearance: Episode 5703; 8 May 2018
- Last appearance: Episode 7203; 8 October 2025
- Introduced by: John Yorke (2018); Ben Wadey (2025)
In-universe information
- Occupation: Barman; Funeral director
- Father: Jonno Highway
- Brothers: Callum Highway
- Wife: Rainie Cross (2020–present)
- Sons: Roland Highway
- Daughters: Zara Highway
- Stepdaughters: Abi Branning (adoptive)
- Grandfathers: Freddie Highway
- Grandmothers: Vi Highway
- Uncles: Christopher

Stuart Highway, played by Ricky Champ, first appears on 8 May 2018, though he is not credited until his second appearance on 10 May. He is the older brother of Callum "Halfway" Highway (Tony Clay) and a childhood friend of Mick Carter (Danny Dyer). Champ's casting was revealed in March 2018 by his agency, while the character and further details were officially announced by the BBC on 28 March 2018, on which Champ said, "I'm so happy to be part of this brilliant team of people on this great show that I grew up watching. Look out Albert Square... Stuart's coming!" It was announced on 10 June 2022 that Champ had been axed by new producer Chris Clenshaw with Stuart set to exit the show later in the year. His final scenes aired on 25 August 2022. On 31 July 2025, it was announced that Stuart will return to EastEnders later in the year for a short stint. He returned on 6 October.

Stuart arrives in a blacked-out car, watching Mick Carter (Danny Dyer), though the car's arrival worries several other people. While Mick is alone in The Queen Victoria pub, a masked man grabs him. However, this is proven to be a prank by Stuart, who says he has been watching Mick all day. They head to the bar of the pub, where Mick's wife, Linda Carter (Kellie Bright), is not happy to see Stuart. Stuart's brother, Halfway, talks about how he was injured in Iraq by shrapnel, but Stuart later tells Halfway he knows he is lying and to tell him what really happened. Stuart tells Halfway that Mick may not forgive him for lying, but Halfway admits that he blames himself for a woman's death when he was saving her child and Mick says it was not his fault, so Halfway tells Stuart he was wrong. Stuart then pays Hayley Slater (Katie Jarvis) to get in bed with a drunken Mick while Linda is away. Linda returns in the morning and she and Mick realise Stuart is to blame, so Linda tells Mick to make sure Stuart never returns, but Mick says Stuart went to a Young Offender Institute instead of Mick when they were 13 and Linda has to accept their friendship. Linda is upset when Stuart breaks her favourite mug, but is thankful when he fixes it, though Stuart insults Linda to Halfway.

Mick hides Stuart's phone as a prank but Stuart overreacts when he cannot find it and Mick sees pictures of and messages to schoolgirls on the phone. Mick confronts Stuart and reports him to the police. However, Stuart explains to Mick that he poses as underage girls online to expose paedophiles. Mick then observes Stuart confronting a man and soon realises that Stuart wants Mick's help to confront more paedophiles. Stuart reveals that he has helped put 17 men in prison and that when he was in the Young Offender Institute, he suffered abuse from an officer. Mick agrees to help Stuart confront a man, but the man is Stuart's friend and they are just testing Mick. Mick is humiliated and Stuart says Mick cannot handle it and adds that he saved Mick from abuse by taking the blame for what Mick did when they were teenagers and calls Mick a coward, which leads to them fighting. Linda then asks Mick to not see Stuart again. Stuart meets Mick anyway and asks Halfway to help confront someone. Mick tries to stop it, and the man, Fred Lewis, runs away. Stuart later asks Halfway to confront Fred again, but Stuart takes over at the last minute, and Mick tells Stuart he has made a mistake with Fred; however, Stuart still posts his confrontation video online. Fred is attacked and Mick gives Stuart an alibi, but the police tell Mick that Fred was contacting local girls to search for his daughter, and this leads to another fight between Mick and Stuart. Mick tells Stuart to post a retraction video, which he does but also vows revenge on Mick. Stuart then intimidates Linda when they are alone, and when Mick finds out, forces him to apologise. Mick's aunt, Tina Carter (Luisa Bradshaw-White), sees Stuart and is wary of him. Tina and Stuart then go out to a 1980s music night, where Stuart requests a song, "We Call It Acieed", that gives Tina a terrifying flashback. Tina tells Sonia Fowler (Natalie Cassidy) that when she was 19 or 20, she would play a game with Stuart and his friends that involved mild "torture", but once she was locked in a car boot, tied up and gagged, and feared she would die when she smelt burning. She recalls that "We Call It Acieed" was playing in the car and Stuart must have done it to her. Tina confronts Stuart but he says it must have been someone else. Tina decides to tell Mick and Linda but Stuart has already told them, and when Stuart knows that Tina was called a "slag" that night, she again thinks it was him. She tells Mick and Linda this, and recalls the football shirt the attacker was wearing, which Mick says Stuart was wearing that day. Mick confronts Stuart and vows to never see Stuart again, and Stuart stabs an old photograph of Mick. Stuart then keys his own car and tells people that Tina did it. He accuses her of starting a hate campaign against him but makes various threats and teases her, singing "We Call It Acieed" and goading her with a wrench, which she takes and hits him on the head with.

After the attack, Stuart seeks revenge on the Carters and unbeknownst to Linda, sneaks into the pub at night, touches Linda in her sleep and records it on video, sending it to Mick. Mick later goes round to Stuart's house and Stuart asks Mick to kill him, goading Mick to attack him when Stuart taunts him about Linda. Later that night, Stuart sneaks into the pub and is shot by an unknown assailant and goes into a coma. His daughter Zara Highway (Faye Daveney) arrives in Walford and claims that one of the Carters shot Stuart. Linda, thinking that Mick has shot him, as he lied about walking Lady Di, then takes the gun and dumps it in the canal to protect him; however, she is spotted by Keanu Taylor (Danny Walters). Later, when Mick asks Linda her whereabouts, she tells him she knows but he is adamant he did not do it and Linda worries whether she did the right thing, though Mick reassures her. The next day, Linda is arrested for Stuart's attempted murder as the rest of the square watch on. When Stuart regains consciousness, he states that Mick shot him. Mick is later arrested and imprisoned. When Stuart makes his statement to the police, Stuart picks at his wound with a fork to cause bleeding, which Zara sees, but Stuart insists that Mick shot him; Zara provides Stuart with an alibi on the day Mick went to Stuart's and Stuart wanted Mick to kill him. Upon being discharged, Zara accompanies Stuart to The Vic, where he offers to tell the police that Mick shot him accidentally in exchange for them to accept Mick is guilty and Zara believes Stuart. Zara is lured to The Vic by Halfway in order for Linda to persuade her that Mick is not responsible and she visits Mick, showing her cigarette burns inflicted on her by herself due to having a childhood without Stuart present and wants him to confess. Zara begins to doubt Stuart when Mick tells her that Linda knew Zara's mum by both her and Mick, and eventually walks out on Stuart. Furious, Stuart then hires fellow convicts in prison to help make Mick's life miserable there.

Later, Linda calls time on her marriage to Mick when he admits he started smothering Stuart. She betrays Mick by visiting Stuart, ignoring Mick's desperate phone call and telephoning Stuart saying she believes him. Linda and Stuart begin meeting regularly and become close despite the family's, especially Tina's, protests. She tells the family she thinks Mick is guilty, throws away her wedding rings, and later throws the family out, then allows Stuart to move in, and calls a solicitor to begin divorce proceedings from Mick. What Stuart, Mick and the rest of their family does not know is that all this is a mere smokescreen from Linda to conceal her plan to help get Mick out of prison, which she eventually confesses to her mother-in-law Shirley Carter (Linda Henry) and swears her to secrecy. Linda manages to get Stuart to confess that Mick did not shoot him and he is arrested for perverting the course of justice. Mick bundles Stuart into the boot of a car and drives to an abandoned factory where he vows to kill him.

Laura-Jayne Tyler of Inside Soap described Stuart as "lairy" and called him "the most objectionable new character in years!" In July 2018, Champ was longlisted for "Best Bad Boy" at The Inside Soap Awards. Stuart's shooting was nominated for Best Soap Storyline at the 2018 Digital Spy Reader Awards; it came in ninth place with 4.3% of the total votes. The reveal that Stuart shot himself was nominated for Biggest OMG Soap moment; it came in tenth place with 4.3% of the total votes. The following year, Champ received a National Television Awards nomination in the Newcomer category for his portrayal of Stuart. In July 2019, Champ was longlisted for "Best Bad Boy" again at The Inside Soap Awards 2019. Following Stuart's 2022 departure, Gary Gillatt from Inside Soap bemoaned the character, writing, "Goodbye then, shouty Stuart. EastEnders always seemed more attached to you then we were. Now we can turn the volume back up".

== Brianna ==
Brianna
- EastEnders character
- Portrayed by: Rina Diamond
- Appears in: Episode 5711; 22 May 2018
- Introduced by: John Yorke

Brianna, played by Rina Diamond, appears in one episode on 22 May 2018. She is a homeless girl who Hayley Slater (Katie Jarvis) talks to on the London Underground and Hayley tells her how she can stay on the train after it reaches the end of the line. Brianna tells Hayley she is 16 despite Hayley thinking she looks 12. Brianna asks Hayley if she has spare sanitary products, so Hayley tells her she can use a sock, but Brianna is not wearing socks. Hayley gives Brianna some cash that she had previously conned from Craig (Nigel Betts) and tells her to go to a shop at the next station, and gives her extra cash so she can get back on the tube. When Brianna returns, she has beer instead and tells Hayley that she stole some socks. Brianna tells Hayley that her mother is a drug addict and alcoholic and she is better off now. Brianna guesses that Hayley is pregnant when she refuses alcohol. Hayley falls asleep and when she wakes up, Brianna and the rest of her money are gone.

After the episode was broadcast, Diamond tweeted that Brianna was an "amazing character to play with so much depth". Viewers noticed a continuity error in Brianna's scenes, as she was able to get off the train, locate the beer, purchase it and return to exactly the same train.

== Umar Kazemi ==
Umar Kazemi
- EastEnders character
- Portrayed by: Selva Rasalingam
- First appearance: Episode 5713; 25 May 2018
- Last appearance: Episode 5737; 6 July 2018
- Introduced by: John Yorke
In-universe information
- Wife: Carmel Kazemi (backstory)
- Sons: Kush Kazemi; Darius Kazemi; Shakil Kazemi
- Grandsons: Arthur Fowler; Zaair Kazemi

Umar Kazemi, played by Selva Rasalingam, first appears in the episode broadcast on 25 May 2018. Umar is the former husband of Carmel Kazemi (Bonnie Langford) and father of Kush Kazemi (Davood Ghadami), Darius Kazemi (Ash Rizi) and Shakil Kazemi (Shaheen Jafargholi). Rasalingam's casting in the role of Umar was reported on 22 May 2018. Umar departs in the episode first broadcast on 6 July 2018.

Umar arrives in Walford following Shakil being stabbed to death and asks how it happened. The following week, he tells Carmel that he has spoken to the imam about Shakil's funeral, and says that it was a "blessing" that Shakil was "taken" this month, saying it was a "gift from God". This angers Carmel, as Shakil was not religious and she says Umar was not there for him. She insults Umar, calling him a drinker and adulterer. Umar later talks to Carmel about when Shakil was born, and she says she no longer wants to be angry with Umar. He invites her and Kush to dinner with him and his partner, Ashleen, and says she can visit him in Dubai. Carmel realises that Umar wants Kush to move to Dubai, and this leads to Carmel attempting suicide.

== Darius Kazemi ==
Darius Kazemi
- EastEnders character
- Portrayed by: Ash Rizi
- First appearance: Episode 5714; 28 May 2018
- Last appearance: Episode 5737; 6 July 2018
- Introduced by: John Yorke
In-universe information
- Occupation: Property developer
- Father: Umar Kazemi
- Mother: Carmel Kazemi
- Brothers: Kush Kazemi; Shakil Kazemi

Darius Kazemi, played by Ash Rizi, first appears in the episode broadcast on 28 May 2018. Darius is the son of Carmel Kazemi (Bonnie Langford) and Umar Kazemi (Selva Rasalingam) and brother to Kush Kazemi (Davood Ghadami) and Shakil Kazemi (Shaheen Jafargholi). Rizi's casting in the role of Darius was first confirmed by Rizi's acting agency, who confirmed he would appear for three episodes. It was then reported on 22 May 2018 that Darius and Umar will arrive following Shakil's death in a stabbing, with Sophie Dainty of Digital Spy reporting that Darius is "desperate for someone to blame". Darius departs in the episode first broadcast on 6 July 2018.

Darius arrives and immediately asks to see Shakil's friend, Keegan Baker (Zack Morris), who was also attacked alongside Shakil but survived, and asks Keegan what Shakil's last words were, accusing him of not waiting for Shakil to get help because Keegan was taken to hospital first. Kush tells Darius he is being unfair. Darius later reminds Kush that he still wants him to go into business with him in Dubai, but Kush says he will not go now.

== Amal Hussain ==
Amal Hussain
- EastEnders character
- Portrayed by: Natasha Jayetileke
- First appearance: Episode 5724; 14 June 2018
- Last appearance: Episode 5725; 15 June 2018
- Introduced by: John Yorke
In-universe information
- Father: Asir Hussain
- Mother: Rana Hussain

Amal Hussain, played by Natasha Jayetileke, appears in the episodes broadcast on 14 and 15 June 2018. She is contacted by Masood Ahmed (Nitin Ganatra) on a dating website and they go on a date together. Masood pretends to be a perfect Muslim to impress Amal, even when she says she is not a practising Muslim. Masood believes she is the daughter of a businessman, Habib Hussain, and hopes that the date can lead to him meeting Habib. However, when Shirley Carter (Linda Henry) discovers Masood's plan, she introduces herself to Amal and says she can give a reference to Amal's father. Amal tells Masood that her father, Asir, is dead. She realises that Masood was putting on an act to impress her, though Masood tries to say that he is still interested in her. She says if he was not a liar she might have fancied him, and leaves. The next day, Amal meets Masood and asks him to take her on a date as long as he is himself. They meet in the café, and Amal's mother, Rana Hussain (Taru Devani), who set up Amal's dating profile, arrives, so Amal asks Masood to lie that they have been dating for two months. Masood is confused when Rana says that he wants to marry Amal, and Amal says Masood should meet the rest of their family tonight so she can show her single cousins that dating sites work. However, Kathy Beale (Gillian Taylforth) realises that Amal is using Masood to show Rana that she does not want to date, so Kathy kisses Masood, causing Rana to leave. Amal thanks Masood and Kathy as it will keep her mother from interfering for a few months.

Amal's storyline was reported by Inside Soap before being broadcast, who said that even though she is not who Masood thought she was, she "seems genuinely keen on getting to know him". Inside Soap also called Amal "enigmatic".

== Jessica Jones ==
Jessica Jones
- EastEnders character
- Portrayed by: Tara Lee
- First appearance: Episode 5751; 31 July 2018
- Last appearance: Episode 5760; 16 August 2018
- Introduced by: John Yorke
In-universe information
- Occupation: Sex worker

Jessica Jones, played by Tara Lee, first appears in the episode broadcast on 31 July 2018. She is introduced as a love interest for Jay Brown (Jamie Borthwick). Jessica last appears in the episode broadcast on 16 August 2018.

Jessica is a woman who answers an advert from Jay Brown and Billy Mitchell (Perry Fenwick), who are looking for a new housemate. Jay is attracted to her and she is interested in his job as an undertaker. She says she works freelance but wants to be a tattoo artist, and she and Jay share interests in gaming and football. After she leaves, Jay agrees to let her move in. Jessica moves in and accepts that Jay is on the Sex Offender Register due to a relationship he had with someone who lied about her age. Billy sees Jessica with Rainie Branning (Tanya Franks) and discovers from Rainie that Jessica is a prostitute. Billy asks her to move out, and Jay wonders why, so Billy asks Jessica to lie to Jay and let him down gently as he likes her, but she asks to be paid to do so. Jessica tells Jay she is moving in with a former boyfriend. Rainie then sees Billy paying Jessica.

The character was announced on 24 July 2018. Jessica is introduced as a new love interest for Jay Brown who moves in with him and Billy Mitchell. Jessica was billed as "scheming", while Sorcha O'Connor of the Irish Independent called her a "strong, confident young woman" and a "tough cookie". Lee described the character as a "strong female role". Sophie Dainty of Digital Spy noted that Jay thinks "all his Christmases had come at once" when Jessica arrives. Jessica is a guest character and leaves during the final episode of the week, leaving Jay "disappointed". The character is not credited with a surname on screen. In promotional material, it was teased that Jessica would know another character, but that character's identity was embargoed. It was later revealed that Jessica is a sex worker and knows Rainie Branning. Lee liked how Jessica was proud of her occupation and how the character acknowledges the difference between a prostitute and a sex worker. She added, "I was really passionate about what [Jessica] stood for, as I think we both share the same disdain for unfair judgement, and that's probably where I see myself in her." Lee received a positive reaction to her Dublin accent and Jessica's bond with Jay. She told O'Connor that she would like to return to the role for a longer stint.

== Marky ==
Marky
- EastEnders character
- Portrayed by: Niall O'Mara
- Appears in: Episode 5753; 3 August 2018
- Introduced by: John Yorke
In-universe information
- Occupation: Pizza delivery driver

Marky (credited as Marky – Pizza Boy), played by Niall O'Mara, appears on 3 August 2018. He is a pizza delivery boy for Lorenzo's Pizza who brings 10 pizzas to The Queen Victoria pub for the Carters. Mick Carter (Danny Dyer) says they have not ordered pizzas, and threatens Marky with violence when he insists on being paid. Marky goes outside to get his tablet to show the family the order, but he discovers his moped has gone and claims he was set up by the Carters. The police are then called. It emerges that Stuart Highway (Ricky Champ) set up the entire scenario and stole the moped.

Digital Spy reported that viewers were "in love" with the character and wanted him to appear again, and called him "gobby" and "a very unlikely new favourite character". Inside Soap said he had a "tiny role" but made the "absolute best of it".

== Stix Redman ==
Stix Redman
- EastEnders character
- Portrayed by: Kasey McKellar
- Duration: 2018-2019
- First appearance: Episode 5754; 6 August 2018
- Last appearance: Episode 5905; 19 April 2019
- Introduced by: John Yorke
In-universe information
- Occupation: Drug dealer

Stix Redman, played by Kasey McKellar, is a gang member with Jagger Rawley (Aaron Thomas Ward). Upon his first appearance, Digital Spy described McKellar to be "no stranger to the TV world," as he played Bailey Wharton in the Tracy Beaker spin-off series, The Dumping Ground alongside Amy-Leigh Hickman, who played Linzi Bragg between 2016-2017.

The gang are seen in a fast-food restaurant by Dennis Rickman (Bleu Landau), selling mobile phones. Dennis buys a phone and when Stix and Jagger see the police, they ask Dennis to hide the bag of phones somewhere safe and they will pay him for it. Dennis hides the bag at the mechanic's garage belonging to his stepfather, Phil Mitchell (Steve McFadden), and it is found by Keanu Taylor (Danny Walters). Keegan Baker (Zack Morris) later sees Stix, Jagger and four other gang members trying to steal a bicycle and tells them it is not worth it, and they ask if he is the person who was stabbed recently; Stix takes a photo of Keegan as he walks away. The gang then return to the garage to collect the bag, but Keanu threatens them with a crowbar. He says they can have the bag as long as they do not return and leave Dennis alone. Phil then arrives and sends them away and they say they will be back. Keanu then finds cannabis in the bag and Dennis receives a text saying "you're dead".

The next day, Keanu sees the gang outside the garage but they leave when Phil calls them immature. They then find Dennis in the café but Keanu arrives and sends them away. Keanu decides to throw the bag in the canal, telling Dennis the gang will not return, but he later finds the garage has been burgled and vandalised by the gang. After Keanu texts Jagger from Dennis's phone, asking to meet at the garage, the gang see Dennis watching them and chase after him, and he ends up with a bloody nose, while the gang beat up Keanu, stamping on him. Phil arrives and fights the gang off. Keanu then sees Stix giving Cody a bag and pointing him in the direction of the garage. Stix is later ejected from The Queen Victoria public house for being underage. He and three other gang members, Biggie, Lisha and Bunhead, then confront Dennis in the garage, and Stix says he "mugged him off" and is "dead".

== Jagger Rawley ==
Jagger Rawley
- EastEnders character
- Portrayed by: Aaron Thomas Ward
- First appearance: Episode 5754; 6 August 2018
- Last appearance: Episode 5817; 23 November 2018
- Introduced by: John Yorke
In-universe information
- Occupation: Drug dealer

Jagger Rawley, played by Aaron Thomas Ward, first appears on 6 August 2018. He is in a gang with Stix Redman (Kasey McKellar), Biggie and Bunhead. They are in a fast-food restaurant and are seen selling mobile phones by 12-year-old Dennis Rickman (Bleu Landau). Dennis buys a phone from them, and when Stix and Jagger see the police, they ask Dennis to hide the bag of phones somewhere safe and they will pay him for it. Dennis hides the bag at the mechanic's garage belonging to his stepfather, Phil Mitchell (Steve McFadden), and it is found by Keanu Taylor (Danny Walters). Keegan Baker (Zack Morris) later sees the gang trying to steal a bicycle and tells them it is not worth it, and they ask if he is the person who was stabbed recently. The gang then return to the garage to collect the bag, but Keanu threatens them with a crowbar. He says they can have the bag as long as they do not return and leave Dennis alone. Phil then arrives and sends them away and they say they will be back. Keanu then finds cannabis in the bag and Dennis receives a text saying "you're dead". The next day, Keanu sees the gang outside the garage but they leave when Phil calls them immature. They then find Dennis in the café and Jagger tells Dennis he now works for them, threatening to tell Phil what Dennis has hidden in the garage. Keanu arrives and sends them away. Keanu decides to throw the bag in the canal, telling Dennis the gang will not return, but he later finds the garage has been burgled and vandalised by the gang. Jagger appears with the bag and Keanu tells him it is now over so leave Dennis alone, but Jagger says he will decide when it is over. Keanu texts Jagger from Dennis's phone, asking to meet at the garage. There, Keanu asks for the tools back that they stole but Jagger says they have sold them. Keanu then says he recorded Jagger's burglary boast and tells them to leave. The gang see Dennis watching them and chase after him, and he ends up with a bloody nose, while the gang beat up Keanu, stamping on him. Phil arrives and fights the gang off. Jagger and his gang continue to hang around the garage and when Stix tells Dennis that Jagger has a job for him and Dennis refuses, the gang attempt to kidnap him in a stolen car, but Keanu and Sharon rescue him.

Jagger meets 15-year-old Tiffany Butcher (Maisie Smith) and later takes her to the park to meet the rest of his gang, and he gives her alcohol. Jagger meets her again and warns off two girls who make Tiffany feel uncomfortable, and he invites Tiffany to his house. Whitney Dean (Shona McGarty) catches Tiffany returning the next day. Tiffany admits to Whitney that Jagger is 19 years old but promises nothing sexual happened between them. Jagger later gives Tiffany a new phone with £50 of credit, saying she can contact him and nobody needs to know.

It was reported on 24 August 2018 that 19-year-old Jagger would be involved in a storyline with 15-year-old Tiffany Butcher (Maisie Smith) in which he potentially grooms her, and Duncan Lindsay from Metro said that "His gift giving and manipulative behaviour are warning signs that he is grooming Tiffany".

== Adam Bateman ==
Adam Bateman
- EastEnders character
- Portrayed by: Stephen Rahman-Hughes
- Duration: 2018–2019
- First appearance: Episode 5764; 23 August 2018
- Last appearance: Episode 6034; 3 December 2019
- Introduced by: John Yorke
In-universe information
- Occupation: Dentist
- Adoptive father: Arshad Ahmed (foster)
- Adoptive mother: Mariam Ahmed (foster)

Adam Bateman, played by Stephen Rahman-Hughes, first appears on 23 August 2018. He is a former foster son of Arshad Ahmed (Madhav Sharma) and Mariam Ahmed (Indira Joshi) and a love interest for Honey Mitchell (Emma Barton). It was announced in September 2019 that Adam had been axed from the soap, and he made his last appearance on 3 December 2019.

When Honey has toothache and unable to get an appointment with a dentist, Arshad arranges for Honey to see his foster son Adam at a dental practice. After the appointment, Adam asks Honey out for dinner. They then go on a date and the next day, Adam sees Honey in Albert Square, and Honey admits to her former partner, Billy Mitchell (Perry Fenwick), that she went on a date with Adam. Adam begins an affair with Habiba Ahmed (Rukku Nahar) in 2019. When Honey sees Adam with Habiba on the CCTV at the Minute Mart, she questions him about it, but he convinces her that Habiba is like a sister to him. Habiba's sister, Iqra Ahmed (Priya Davdra), learns of the affair, and threatens him, saying that his affair will come out. As part of a "wife swap" event, Adam stays at Iqra's house, where she sees that he is also seeing a woman called Sally. Iqra tells Honey, who later exposes Adam in front of an audience, and throws him out of the flat, hitting him in the face with a bin.

Rahman-Hughes' casting and the character of Adam were announced on 7 August 2018. Of his casting, Rahman-Hughes said he is "thrilled to [be] joining" EastEnders, calling the cast "incredible" and the show "iconic", adding "it really is a dream come true". Billed as "dashing", it was reported that, as Adam "establishes" himself as the local dentist, he would "set his sights" on Honey and that a potential relationship between Adam and Honey will make Honey's former partner, Billy, "less than happy when he learns that Honey is moving on", so could "seek to make things difficult for the pair." It was also reported that Adam would be "making an impact" for Arshad and Mariam, who fostered Adam from the age of eight.

== DCI Peter Arthurs ==
DCI Peter Arthurs
- EastEnders character
- Portrayed by: Ian Burfield
- Duration: 2018, 2020–2022, 2024–2025
- First appearance: Episode 5771; 4 September 2018
- Last appearance: Episode 7060; 3 February 2025
- Introduced by: John Yorke (2018); Jon Sen (2020); Chris Clenshaw (2024)
In-universe information
- Occupation: Detective chief inspector

DCI Peter Arthurs made his first appearance on 4 September 2018. He is portrayed by Ian Burfield, who previously played DI Hamilton in 1997 and DI Kelly between 2007 and 2010. He first arrives as a detective inspector investigating the shooting of Stuart Highway (Ricky Champ); he continued to make recurring appearances until December 2024.

DI Arthurs first appears investigating the shooting of Stuart Highway (Ricky Champ) at The Queen Victoria pub, questioning landlord Mick Carter (Danny Dyer) and his wife, Linda Carter (Kellie Bright). Two years later, Arthurs, now a detective chief inspector, questions Gray Atkins (Toby-Alexander Smith) about the death of his wife, Chantelle Atkins (Jessica Plummer). He then questions Gray about Kheerat Panesar (Jaz Deol) after a report is made against him; Gray informs Arthurs that Kheerat wanted Chantelle to leave Gray for him, but believes that he would not harm Chantelle. Arthurs visits Gray to inform him that the coroner has ruled Chantelle's death accidental; he explains that he thought it would be a comfort to hear the news, which Gray rejects. Following the attack on Ian Beale (Adam Woodyatt), he arrests Tina Carter (Luisa Bradshaw-White) on suspicion of assaulting Ian; she is later cleared by him. Whitney Dean (Shona McGarty) develops suspicions over Chantelle's death that occurred nearly two years earlier and she tells Arthurs she believes Gray murdered her. Arthurs speaks to Gray, leading to him dismissing Whitney's concerns. He later informs Shirley Carter (Linda Henry) and Mick Carter (Danny Dyer) that Tina's body has been recovered from the derelict building that was the Argee Bhajee Indian restaurant. Accusations are made again about Gray, this time suspecting him of murdering Tina as well as Chantelle. Evidence is found and Arthurs finally arrests Gray for the murders.

Arthurs reappears two years later when Keanu Taylor's (Danny Walters) body is discovered underneath the cafe. He breaks the news to Keanu's sister Bernadette Taylor (Clair Norris) and Felix Baker (Matthew James Morrison). Arthurs later arrests Sharon Watts (Letitia Dean) on suspicion of Keanu's murder. Linda, Keanu's actual murderer, who helped bury the body alongside the rest of The Six, gives a false statement to Arthurs, claiming she witnessed Dean Wicks (Matt Di Angelo) dragging the body into the Bridge Street Café, and that she hadn't gone to the police as she feared retribution from Dean, who had raped her ten years previously; Arthurs subsequently arrests Dean for Keanu's murder. Subsequent to this, the police discover the meat thermometer used to kill Keanu in Dean's flat, having been planted there by Stacey Slater (Lacey Turner). Arthurs returns to Albert Square to interview Stacey, her mother Jean Slater (Gillian Wright) and Jean's boyfriend Harvey Monroe (Ross Boatman) after Dean alleges that one of them planted the murder weapon in his flat in order to frame him. During these interviews, Arthurs discovers that Dean was deliberately withholding vital medication from his daughter Jade Masood (Elizabeth Green); Arthurs subsequently re-arrests Dean and charges him with Keanu's murder. Arthurs attends Dean's trial in September 2024, where Dean confesses to raping Linda; Dean formally confesses to the charges shortly after the judge declares a mistrial. After Linda, an alcoholic, attempts to confess to the murder herself, Arthurs refuses to charge her, believing she is intoxicated.

In late October 2024, Arthurs re-interviews The Six, alongside Nish Panesar (Navin Chowdhry), now suspecting the women of being responsible for Keanu's murder. Unbeknownst to Arthurs, Nish discovers the truth himself and eventually agrees to take the blame for the murder so that The Six may evade justice. He summons Arthurs to Albert Square, where he fabricates a story that he hired hitmen to kidnap, murder, and bury Keanu on Christmas Day 2023 following a public disagreement between the pair shortly beforehand; Arthurs proceeds to arrest Nish for Keanu's murder.

Arthurs returns on Boxing Day 2024 to investigate the attack on Cindy Beale (Michelle Collins), during which he confronts Kathy Cotton (Gillian Taylforth) for being involved in another dramatic Christmas Day.

== Ray Kelly ==
Ray Kelly
- EastEnders character
- Portrayed by: Sean Mahon
- Duration: 2018–2019
- First appearance: Episode 5771; 4 September 2018
- Last appearance: Episode 5845; 4 January 2019
- Introduced by: John Yorke
- Spin-off appearances: EastEnders: The Podcast (2018)
In-universe information
- Other names: Simon Wright
- Occupation: Undercover police officer
- Sisters: Ciara Maguire
- Wife: Dee Kelly (backstory); Nicola Kelly (backstory—2019); Mel Owen (backstory, void; 2019, void); Maddie Wright (backstory, void)
- Sons: Jake Wright
- Daughters: Jodie Kelly
- Stepsons: Hunter Owen

Ray Kelly, played by Sean Mahon, first appears on 4 September 2018. Ray is the polygamous third husband of Mel Owen (Tamzin Outhwaite) and the stepfather to Mel's son, Hunter Owen (Charlie Winter).

Ray is mentioned several times throughout 2018, as Hunter stays in contact with him. Ray arrives at local nightclub E20 as Mel is about to respond to Jack Branning's (Scott Maslen) marriage proposal. Ray tells Mel he came because Hunter told him she was in trouble, but Mel says it was a lie. Ray leaves, but Mel later calls him. They meet and talk about their past, and he says he left his job in the police because he made mistakes after she left him and that letting her go was a mistake. She says it is too late and pushes him away when he goes to kiss her, but she then kisses him. Ray spends the night with Mel and makes sure Hunter finds out, and Hunter reveals to Jack that Mel and Ray had sex. Mel tells Jack that Ray is her soulmate and he has changed, but Jack does not believe it and meets a former police colleague to find out anything bad about Ray. Ray does not turn up to a meal and makes calls in secret. After a man, Jeff, calls Ray "Simon", Hunter discovers Ray has passports in the name Simon Wright. Ray tells Hunter he is an undercover police officer but Mel cannot know about it; he gives 15-year-old Hunter alcohol without his knowledge and him drunk and in agony. Ray then cheats on Mel with a woman called Gina. Jeff tells Ray he is thinking of moving to Albert Square; Ray fails to put him off so beats him up, saying if he ever returns he will knock out his teeth. Jack and Ray agree to call a truce but after a bruised Jeff tells Jack he is pulling out of renting a flat from him and sees that he is scared of Ray, Jack tells Mel that Ray assaulted his tenant. Ray visits Jack and threatens to harm his children if he continues to talk about him to Mel. Mel soon discovers Ray is visiting a boy in hospital called Jake Wright (River Archer), and speaks to his mother, Maddie Wright (Robyn Page). Mel then asks Ray to marry her again and move in with her. Ray later claims he does not have enough money in his bank account to pay for Mel's engagement ring but she sees a receipt showing a balance of £142,878.04. Ray realises Mel saw his bank balance so tells her that he is saving up to buy E20 for her. Louise Mitchell (Tilly Keeper) develops a crush on Ray when he calls her a "beautiful woman". Ray gets a call and tells Mel he has to deal with a woman named Maddie at the police station. Mel contacts Maddie but Ray is not with her, so they meet and Mel finds out where Ray's regular pub is. Mel goes there and sees him meeting another woman, Jodie (Katie Buchholz). Mel then finds out that Jodie is Ray's daughter and he has another wife, Nicola Kelly (Alexandra Gilbreath). Nicola tells Mel and Maddie that she believes Ray murdered his first wife, Dee, and the three women agree to get revenge on Ray. Ray successfully purchases Phil Mitchell's (Steve McFadden) share of E20 by blackmailing him over his role in the death of Luke Browning (Adam Astill) and the disappearance of Vincent Hubbard (Richard Blackwood). On the day of his wedding to Mel, he talks to her about knowing Nicola, during which she reveals she knows Maddie. He then strangles her to keep her quiet and goes to the wedding. Mel recovers and goes to the wedding, much to Ray's horror. They marry and afterwards, Ray is arrested for bigamy after Nicola and Maddie go to the police. Ray later escapes from the police and attempts once again to strangle Mel to death; however, he is shot and killed by Hunter.

It was first reported on 1 July 2018 that Ray would join the series in the autumn. A show spokesperson said, "Now that Mel is settled after overcoming her initial challenges and has secured a job and built a relationship with Jack, it's time to weave in her first major storyline since her return. And it is a big one—she really shouldn't trust Ray and he will make his presence felt immediately after arriving." The character and Mahon's casting were officially confirmed on 9 July 2018. It was reported that Ray's arrival would threaten Mel's relationship with Jack. The character was described as "a serial risk-taker and expert liar" and a source said, "It's safe to say that the residents of Walford shouldn't be fooled by Ray's slick exterior—a man who thrives on danger and who cannot be trusted is lurking underneath". Mahon said of his casting, "I'm so happy to join such an incredibly hard-working and talented team and I'm very much looking forward to playing out the drama that inevitably ensues on any given day in Albert Square. My character, Ray Kelly is not one to tread lightly and his arrival to the Square will cause shockwaves for many of the residents... it doesn't get much better than that." Executive consultant John Yorke said, "Sean is both a wonderful actor and a delight to work with. His character brings to the show some very big secrets and we can't wait to watch them explode."

== Zara Highway ==
Zara Highway
- EastEnders character
- Portrayed by: Faye Daveney
- First appearance: Episode 5774; 10 September 2018
- Last appearance: Episode 5785; 28 September 2018
- Introduced by: John Yorke
In-universe information
- Father: Stuart Highway
- Mother: Sal
- Half-brothers: Roland Highway
- Grandfathers: Jonno Highway
- Uncles: Callum Highway
- Other relatives: Freddie Highway; Vi Highway

Zara Highway, played by Faye Daveney, first appears on 10 September 2018. She is the daughter of Stuart Highway (Ricky Champ) and the niece of Callum "Halfway" Highway (Tony Clay). Zara departs in episode 5785, originally broadcast on 28 September 2018.

Zara arrives after Stuart is taken to hospital after being shot in The Queen Victoria public house. Halfway tells her that Stuart was shot in the pub, leaving Zara to believe that one of the Carters is responsible for Stuart's shooting. After Halfway accuses her of not caring about Stuart, she slaps him. Halfway persuades her to stay in Walford. Stuart alleges Mick Carter (Danny Dyer) shot him when he regains consciousness. When he makes his statement to the police, Stuart picks at his wound with a fork to cause bleeding, which she sees, but Stuart promises to Zara that Mick shot him; Zara provides Stuart with an alibi on the day Mick went to Stuart's and Stuart wanted Mick to kill him. Upon being discharged, Zara accompanies Stuart to The Queen Vic, where he offers to tell the police that Mick shot him accidentally in exchange for them to accept Mick is guilty and Zara believes Stuart. Zara is lured to The Queen Vic by Halfway in order for Mick's wife Linda Carter (Kellie Bright) to persuade her that Mick is not responsible and she visits Mick, showing her cigarette burns inflicted on her by herself due to having a childhood without Stuart present and wants him to confess. Zara begins to doubt Stuart upon being told that Linda knew Zara's mother by both her and Mick. Zara walks out on Stuart.

Daveney's casting as Zara was announced on the day of her first episode. After the episode, Justin Harp from Digital Spy called Zara "feisty and snarky from her debut scene" and reported that her quips had viewers "raving over her".

== Bev Slater ==
Bev Slater, played by Ashley McGuire, is Hayley Slater's (Katie Jarvis) estranged mother. She first appears in the episode broadcast on 18 September 2018, and makes her final appearance in the episode broadcast on 11 January 2019. Inside Soap called Bev "a cruel, loathsome, remorseless beeyatch" and hoped she would return after her initial three-episode stint.

== Cherry Slater ==
Cherry Slater
- EastEnders character
- Duration: 2018–2020
- First appearance: Episode 5803; 30 October 2018
- Last appearance: Episode 6116; 19 May 2020
- Introduced by: John Yorke
In-universe information
- Family: Slater
- Father: Alfie Moon
- Mother: Hayley Slater
- Stepmother: Kat Slater
- Half-brothers: Bert Moon; Ernie Moon; Tommy Moon (adoptive)
- Grandmothers: Bev Slater
- Other relatives: Stacey Slater; Kat Slater; Lily Slater; Tommy Moon; Arthur Fowler; Hope Fowler; Charli Slater

Cherry Slater first appears on 30 October 2018. She is the daughter of Hayley Slater (Katie Jarvis) and Alfie Moon (Shane Richie).

While Hayley is pregnant with her baby, she tells Alfie she has had an abortion and tries to conceal the pregnancy from the rest of her family, including her cousin, Alfie's estranged wife, Kat Moon (Jessie Wallace). Jean Slater (Gillian Wright) realises that Alfie is the father but agrees not to say anything. Children's services become involved when Hayley contemplates suicide. Hayley gives birth in a drugs house and passes out shortly after. They are found and the baby is healthy but Hayley takes her out of the hospital early and leaves her on the doorstep of foster carers Arshad Ahmed (Madhav Sharma) and Mariam Ahmed (Indira Joshi). When the baby vomits blood, the Ahmeds meet Hayley in the hospital where Hayley tells social worker Hilary Taylor (Sadie Shimmin) that she can look after the baby, but afterwards, Hayley's mother, Bev Slater (Ashley McGuire), takes the baby and Hayley allows it. Bev shows Hayley how to feed her baby and suggests naming her Rose but when Hayley says she cannot be a mother, Bev says they will find a family for her and make money out of the situation. Bev tells Hayley that she can get a few hundred pounds but Bev speaks to someone, agreeing a price of £100,000 to adopt the baby. Kat tracks Hayley down and Bev offers her £30,000 if she goes along with the deal, but Kat reveals this to Hayley, and Kat and Hayley leave with the baby. After Hayley tells Alfie the baby must be called Slater, not Moon, Alfie says he should be able to pick the first name, so suggests Cherry, his mother's name, and Hayley registers the birth. When both Hayley and Alfie leave Albert square, Cherry is left in Kat's care.

It was reported Hayley would have a "horror [...] ordeal" around Halloween as she will be alone as she gives birth, which is described as a "terrifying twist" and leaves Hayley "panic stricken." Hayley's anxiety also increases under the pressure of keeping the secret about the baby's paternity and her plan to "attempt to do a runner" is stopped when she goes into labour, putting her and her baby in a "worrying situation". Following the birth, Hayley, described as "struggling" and "overwhelmed", abandons her baby with Mariam and Arshad; however, her baby suffering a "scare" reportedly makes Hayley "rise to her responsibilities" and "reevaluate her earlier decision to give up her child."

Cherry made her last appearance on 19 May 2020. On 27 August 2020, it was reported that Cherry would not be returning after the show resumed filming following the COVID-19 pandemic hiatus, with her absence being explained via the show's Instagram page as Kat taking her back to Hayley prior to the lockdown.

== Evie Steele ==
Evie Steele
- EastEnders character
- Portrayed by: Sophia Capasso
- Duration: 2018–2019
- First appearance: Episode 5811; 13 November 2018
- Last appearance: Episode 5893; 29 March 2019
- Introduced by: John Yorke
In-universe information
- Occupation: Drug dealer

Evie Steele, played by Sophia Capasso, first appears in episode 5811, which was first broadcast on 13 November 2018. She is an acquaintance of Jagger Rawley (Aaron Thomas Ward).

Tiffany Butcher (Maisie Smith) encounters Evie in the local chicken restaurant and is immediately befriended by her. When Jagger hassles Tiffany, Evie warns him away. Tiffany bunks off school to go shopping and eating with Evie; Evie admits she is an acquaintance of Jagger's and Tiffany should do some work for them to work off a debt. Tiffany is given a gift of expensive trainers by Evie and Tiffany decides to do some work to repay Evie's kindness. When Jagger requires a place to stay for a few days, Tiffany sneaks him into Ted Murray's (Christopher Timothy) flat; however, more people show up and Tiffany discovers Evie is a drug dealer and in charge. Tiffany demands they leave and threatens to phone the police, but Evie prevents Tiffany from doing so by claiming her family do not care. After rejecting the offer to go with Evie, Jagger and Vix (Lukwesa Mwamba), Tiffany changes her mind. Tiffany visits Evie at Ted's flat to tell them that the Taylor family living above can hear them and Evie later thanks Tiffany for warning them as she prevented possible trouble with the police; Evie also assigns Tiffany another job involving drugs that requires Bernadette Taylor (Clair Norris) to go with her. Bernadette is reluctant to bunk off school with Tiffany and Evie insists Bernadette needs to go with her so Tiffany does not stand out. Tiffany reveals to Bernadette about her involvement with drugs and Tiffany convinces Bernadette to go with her when she kisses her and the following day, Evie gives Tiffany the package.

Billed as "a dangerous new friend" for Tiffany, who is a "bad girl", Evie impresses with her "boldness", which reels Tiffany in. Katie Bailie from Metro speculated if "a dangerous romance" could develop, observing "a moment of electricity [...] in the air" and Tiffany "seems to be allowing herself to be charmed by the gang leader" in Evie's debut episodes.

== Morag Morgan ==
Morag Morgan
- EastEnders character
- Portrayed by: Julia Hills
- First appearance: Episode 5816; 22 November 2018
- Last appearance: Episode 5830; 17 December 2018
- Introduced by: John Yorke
In-universe information
- Occupation: Choir leader

Morag Morgan is played by Julia Hills. She first appears in episode 5816, first broadcast on 22 November 2018, and departs in episode 5830, first shown on 17 December 2018. She appears in eight episodes.

Morag first appears in the local shop and invites Kim Fox-Hubbard (Tameka Empson) and Honey Mitchell (Emma Barton) to join her choir, Walford Warblers, as she will be in a concert on Christmas Eve. She mentions that she once taught Lily Allen. Jean Slater (Gillian Wright) and Ian Beale (Adam Woodyatt) also join the choir. Ian leaves when he thinks Morag is flirting, because he is the only male there, but Jean convinces him to return because Morag said she knows Alan Sugar and he will be at the concert. Various other people then join after hearing there will be a £5,000 prize for the best choir. Eventually, Morag gives the solo to Jean, despite protests from Kim. However, Morag criticises Jean's imperfect performance and keeps the members practicing for over three hours, during which time, Morag also claims to know Imelda Staunton. Morag tells Jean off for answering a phone call during practice and then tells everyone their vocals were awful, so Jean defends everyone but Morag claims that she knows better than Jean because she has more experience. Kim then reveals that she has looked Morag up on the Internet and she is lying about her credentials. Jean is almost mugged before going to one choir practice and Morag criticises her further, though everyone defends her. Morag ignores them and sends Jean to sing with the background singers, so Jean leaves. Ian then calls Morag a bully and everyone agrees, and they refuse to listen to her, turning their backs on her. Morag demands that they turn around, but they ignore her, so she tells them she has washed her hands of them and leaves. Ian then takes over the choir. Following this, Jean discovers that Morag missed the deadline for entry into the Battle of the Boroughs choir competition, but the choir perform a carol concert in Albert Square on Christmas Eve.

Hills' casting in the role of Morag was reported on 13 November 2018. The character, a choir leader, was described as "larger-than-life", "a big personality" and "bossy and boastful". It was said the character would "ruffle some feathers" and get on the wrong side of other characters. She was also called "feisty" and "domineering". It was announced she would appear in "several" episodes.

== Mica Fox-Danes ==
Mica Fox-Danes
- EastEnders character
- Portrayed by: Maylo Miller
- Duration: 2018–present
- First appearance: Episode 5834; 24 December 2018
- Introduced by: John Yorke
In-universe information
- Father: Vincent Hubbard
- Mother: Kim Fox
- Stepfather: Howie Danes
- Sisters: Pearl Fox
- Grandfathers: Henry Hubbard
- Grandmothers: Claudette Hubbard; Emerald Fox
- Aunts: Denise Fox; Daphne Fox
- First cousins: Chelsea Fox; Libby Fox; Raymond Fox
- Other relatives: Jordan Fox

Mica Fox (previously Fox-Hubbard) is the son of Kim Fox (Tameka Empson) and Vincent Hubbard (Richard Blackwood), and is played by Maylo Miller. He first appears in Episode 5834 on 24 December, when he is born in the staff room of the Minute Mart, where Kim works, and is delivered by Phil Mitchell (Steve McFadden), who had accidentally locked them in a storage unit. Mica leaves Walford with Kim and his older sister Pearl (Arayah Harris-Buckle) when his mother gets the offer of a job as a tour guide in Scotland in August 2019, but returns in November 2020; however, he is not seen until late December. In April 2023, Mica runs away after Kim's arrest for dangerous driving, when she crashes the car while answering a text message, with Denzel Danes (Jaden Ladega) in the back.

== Other characters ==
Character	Date(s)	Actor	Circumstances
Milo	1–2 January (2 episodes)	Ciarán Griffiths	Milo is an associate of Aidan Maguire (Patrick Bergin), who is the passenger in a van that Aidan is planning to rob at gunpoint, while Robert, an associate of Ciara Maguire (Denise McCormack), the victim of the robbery, is the driver. Milo's plan is to give Robert directions, but Robert insists he knows the route and tries to go a different way, though Milo convinces him to follow his directions. This leads to the van being diverted to Albert Square, where it is held up by Aidan's gang of Mick Carter (Danny Dyer), Phil Mitchell (Steve McFadden), Vincent Hubbard (Richard Blackwood) and Keanu Taylor (Danny Walters), who tie up Milo and Robert. When Robert calls Milo a "snake", Phil punches Robert in the face.
Robert	1–8 March (4 episodes)	Orli Shuka	
PC Khan	2 January – 11 June (2 episodes)	Alexandra D'Sa	A police officer investigating a robbery and shooting in Walford. She is later present when Kim Fox-Hubbard (Tameka Empson) attends the police station about her missing husband, Vincent Hubbard (Richard Blackwood).
Dr Notley	2 January	Miranda Keeling	A doctor who performs a test on Abi Branning (Lorna Fitzgerald) to check for any reaction following her brainstem death. Abi shows no reaction but her father, Max Branning (Jake Wood) insists she did, but Dr Notley insists as it is the second set of tests she has received and that Max needs to think about switching off Abi's life support.
Harry Wilson	2–4 January (2 episodes)	Peter Hamilton Dyer	A medical negligence lawyer for Ledwood Solicitors visited by Max Branning (Jake Wood), who wants to stop doctors turning off life support for his daughter, Abi Branning (Lorna Fitzgerald). Harry says that brainstem death is irreversible but when Max insists that Abi has shown a reaction, Harry says they can take out a court order. Later, Harry tells Max that he would be unable to pick a doctor who would agree with him.
Mr Brown	3 January	Russell Barnett	A man who finds Billy Mitchell (Perry Fenwick) with Aidan Maguire (Patrick Bergin) and Phil Mitchell (Steve McFadden) at the chapel of rest where his dead mother-in-law is. When he questions why they are there, Aidan claims to be a vicar, and Mr Brown asks Aidan to perform a short service in the chapel. He is impressed when Aidan speaks in his native Irish and reveals that he hated his mother-in-law.
Eddie Hawkins	9 January	Anton Saunders	A jewellery dealer who Ben Mitchell (Harry Reid) meets in a café to sell stolen jewellery to him, using a false name. Ben claims he inherited it from his aunt and Eddie asks for receipts to prove the value of the items, but as Ben does not have them he is forced to accept £1000.
PC Anna Heckley	11 January	Harriet Green	A police officer who helps in the search for Daisy (Amelie Smith) when she goes missing.
Blake	18–19 January (2 episodes)	Jon Ewart	Blake is a man who Tiffany Butcher (Maisie Smith) meets after she runs away from home. Blake comments that Tiffany looks like her online photos and asks if she is 16, to which she lies and says she is. Raf is Blake's friend. They both smoke drugs in Raf's car whilst Tiffany is in the back seat. She leans over to the driver's side to unlock the doors and then runs into a car park where Blake and Raf chase her. Whitney Dean (Shona McGarty) and Martin Fowler (James Bye) then arrive to help her.
Raf	19 January	James El-Sharawy	Blake is a man who Tiffany Butcher (Maisie Smith) meets after she runs away from home. Blake comments that Tiffany looks like her online photos and asks if she is 16, to which she lies and says she is. Raf is Blake's friend. They both smoke drugs in Raf's car whilst Tiffany is in the back seat. She leans over to the driver's side to unlock the doors and then runs into a car park where Blake and Raf chase her. Whitney Dean (Shona McGarty) and Martin Fowler (James Bye) then arrive to help her.
Ruth	23 January– 11 October	Uncredited	A woman who works on Bridge Street Market.
Colin	24 January	Uncredited	A customer in The Queen Victoria public house who plays cards with another man.
Vodka Vonnie	25 January	Uncredited	A regular customer at The Queen Victoria public house who Mick Carter (Danny Dyer) greets as he opens the pub.
Joey the Wig	25 January	Sebastian Abineri	A jewellery dealer who Mick Carter (Danny Dyer) contacts about a ring. Joey visits Mick and values the halo stones at £20,000 but takes the ring away to get a second opinion on the centre stone. Joey later returns and confirms the ring is worth between £200,000 and £210,000.
Savannah Sweeting	29 January – 22 February (4 episodes)	Georgina Redhead	An estate agent who works for Tenuta Estate Agents, she meets Vincent Hubbard (Richard Blackwood) to discuss selling the Albert bar, though Vincent's wife, Kim Fox-Hubbard (Tameka Empson) confronts them, thinking they are having an affair. Vincent later tells her to sell The Albert to a buyer who is asking £100,000 less but is will to pay cash. Vincent continues to meet with her over the sale.
PC Jed Adams	30 January	Alexander Newland	A police officer who investigates a break-in at The Albert bar, and he knows the owner, Vincent Hubbard (Richard Blackwood) from his times as a police informant. After finding out that Vincent is selling the bar even though business is good, Adams tells Vincent that he should come to the police if he is in trouble but Vincent says he can handle it.
Noor	2 February	Goldy Notay	A woman who Arshad Ahmed (Madhav Sharma) asks his nephew, Masood Ahmed (Nitin Ganatra), to go on a date with to keep his aunt, Mariam Ahmed (Indira Joshi) happy. Noor comes for dinner but goes to leave when she thinks Masood wants a wife, saying she is only there to keep her mother happy. Masood says he is meeting her for the same reason, so they go for a drink in The Queen Victoria public house where Masood tells Noor about his money problems, she offers Masood her business card mentioning if he every needs advice on Business Law or Divorce he can call her, they then go their separate ways.
Mrs Eaton	5 February	Uncredited	A customer of Coker & Mitchell funeral home, who is seeing her sister, Mrs Townsend.
Wayne	5 February	Uncredited	An engineer who repairs the fridges in Coker & Mitchell funeral home.
Viktoria	6 February – 26 April (4 episodes)	Cathy Walker	A social worker overseeing the adoption of Daisy (Amelie Smith). She is contacted by Mariam Ahmed (Indira Joshi) when she becomes concerned about Dan and Ashley (Ifan Meredith and Ashley Cook) adopting Daisy. Viktoria visits the Ahmeds with Dan and Ashley and talks to Ashley about concerns he has raised and says the adoption can go ahead. Viktoria oversees Dan and Ashley collecting Daisy from Arshad and Mariam and compliments Arshad, saying he is one of the best foster carers she knows. Viktoria decides to move the Ahmed's foster child, Harley, to an emergency placement when his birth parents have tracked him down from a photo online.
Mr Smythe	6 February	Jamie Newall	An undertaker who Billy Mitchell (Perry Fenwick) visits for a potential job after being sacked by Les Coker (Roger Sloman) and Pam Coker (Lin Blakley) when he was involved in illegally exhuming a grave and his part was identified by a CCTV image of one of their hearses. Mr Smythe is aware of what happened through Les and is disgusted with Billy, refusing him a trial.
Mrs Trevithick	8 February	Uncredited	A woman in Coker & Mitchell funeral home whose husband has recently died.
Debbie	8–9 February	Uncredited	A woman who works in the Minute Mart shop. Billy Mitchell (Perry Fenwick) asks her where his wife and Debbie's colleague, Honey Mitchell (Emma Barton), is but Debbie replies that she does not know. The next day Carmel Kazemi (Bonnie Langford) asks her if Honey is at home.
Nurse Marina Herrick	12–16 February (2 episodes)	Katrina Nare	A nurse who tells Max Branning (Jake Wood) that Abi Branning's (Lorna Fitzgerald) baby, also called Abi Branning, is still too weak to attend her mother's funeral. She also takes a photograph of the baby for Max.
Tilly	21 February	Jacqueline Roberts	The mother of Georgi (Holly Donovan), who is seeking help from Shirley Carter (Linda Henry). After Georgi tells Shirley's sister, Tina Carter (Luisa Bradshaw-White), of the difficult relationship she has with her mother, Tina texts Tilly from Georgi's phone and meets her in a café, as she wants to try to help to repair their relationship, and gives Tilly the address of where Georgi is staying. When Tina gets back, Georgi is furious that Tina met Tilly and disclosed where she is to her after telling her that Georgi needs her, and Shirley tells Tina that Georgi stole money from Tilly.
Cal	21 February – 2 March (4 episodes)	Jesse Rutherford	A drug dealer who operates out of The Queen Victoria public house toilets. Shirley Carter (Linda Henry) catches him and tell him to leave, to which he says his boss will be unhappy. Landlord Mick Carter (Danny Dyer) later throws him out but Cal returns with Aidan Maguire (Patrick Bergin).
PC Harding	27 February – 10 August (2 episodes)	Jason Bailey	A police officer. In August, he informs the Carter family that Stuart Highway (Ricky Champ) has withdrawn a statement about Tina Carter (Luisa Bradshaw-White) assaulting him, but informs them that it is still up to the Crown Prosecution Service if Tina will be charged. (Initially credited as Police Officer)
DI Ross	2 March	Martin Askew	A police officer who leads the drug raid on The Queen Victoria public house after a tip-off from Linda Carter (Kellie Bright).
Victor	6 March	Kevin Eldon	A hitman who is contacted by Mick Carter (Danny Dyer) with a view to killing Aidan Maguire (Patrick Bergin), who has threatened his family. Victor visits Mick at The Queen Victoria public house and tells him about how he got into the job, and asks him if he is entirely sure he wants Aidan killed. Mick's wife, Linda Carter (Kellie Bright), overhears Victor telling Mick that not everyone can handle having someone's death on the conscience, so although Victor agrees to the hit, Linda calls it off, and Victor says it was the correct decision.
Jenny	19 March	Uncredited	A social worker who places Harley with foster carers Arshad Ahmed (Madhav Sharma) and Mariam Ahmed (Indira Joshi).
Chris	22 March	Uncredited	A driver who drives Annie Pritchard (Martha Howe-Douglas) to see Mo Harris (Laila Morse).
Annie Pritchard	22 March–30 March (3 episodes)	Martha Howe-Douglas	The daughter of a man named Terry, who Mo Harris (Laila Morse) conned out of £5,000. Annie arrives to get the money back, but Mo's family fool her into believing Mo has died and offer to pay the money. Annie witnesses Stacey Fowler (Lacey Turner) getting hassle from the press and she finds out from Martin Fowler (James Bye) that Mo is alive. Mo sneaks off and encounters Annie, who injures Mo, leaving her with cuts to her face. The following day, her henchman turns up on the doorstep and tells Mo that Annie wants £5,000 by Friday. Stacey's mother, Jean Walters (Gillian Wright), gives them the money. Stacey does not think they should give it to her so when Annie turns up, Stacey tells her they do not have the money, resulting in Annie slapping her. Jean gives her the money. Annie counts it and leaves.
Sarah	26 March	Uncredited	A woman who Michelle Fowler (Jenna Russell) sees with Phil Mitchell (Steve McFadden), going into his house. Michelle tells Phil's wife, Sharon Mitchell (Letitia Dean) about it, so Sharon confronts Phil about having an affair, but Phil explains that he is Sarah's sponsor for alcohol addiction.
Chris	27 March	Andrew Lawden	Chris is an associate of Annie Pritchard's (Martha Howe-Douglas), who forces his way into the Slaters house and tells Mo Harris (Laila Morse) that Annie wants her money by the end of the week.
Marla Baker	27 March	Elicia Daly	The wife of Mitch Baker (Roger Griffiths), who he breaks up with over the phone to reunite with his former girlfriend Karen Taylor (Lorraine Stanley). Marla arrives on Albert Square to see Karen as she wants Mitch back, announcing she is pregnant and both Karen and Marla confront Mitch. When Mitch returns to Marla, she reveals she is not pregnant.
Shelley	30 March	Jennifer Nicholas	Shelley is the organiser of the chess competition and Wesley is a competitor. Ted Murray (Christopher Timothy) persuades Shelley to let Bernadette Taylor (Clair Norris) play when they arrive late and she warns Ted and Wesley's father (Mark Lingwood) when Ted accuses Wesley, who wins against Bernadette, of distracting her. Shelley praises Bernadette's performance and asks her to join the chess club. Wesley later plays a match against Bernadette at a tournament but Bernadette leaves after hearing Ted is unwell.
Wesley	30 March – 24 August (2 episodes)	Alex Britt	
Alison Smith	19–20 April	Julianne White	An investor who interviews Ian Beale (Adam Woodyatt) and likes his business pitch, but Ian's has been mixed up with Masood Ahmed's (Nitin Ganatra). Masood realises and interrupts, and Alison says that they can double the investment if they are a partnership, so they reluctantly agree.
Tara	23 April	Isobel Raine	A social worker who takes Harley to see his half-brother on a supervised visit.
Sarah-Jane Spilsbury	23 April – 21 August (3 episodes)	Shannon Murray	A reporter from the Walford Gazette who interviews Ian Beale (Adam Woodyatt) about his new business venture. She later attends a press conference on tackling knife crime. She returns to Albert Square to cover the disastrous opening of Ian's restaurant for the newspaper.
DI Speck	26 April–25 May (2 episodes)	Jamie Martin	A police officer who investigates Harley's disappearance from Arshad Ahmed (Madhav Sharma) and Masood Ahmed's (Nitin Ganatra) care. After Shakil Kazemi (Shaheen Jafargholi) is stabbed and killed, Speck allows his family to see him.
Calvin Hoskins	27 April – 14 September (5 episodes)	Colin Tierney	A social worker who assesses if Max (Jake Wood) and Rainie Branning (Tanya Franks) can take custody of Max's granddaughter Abi Branning. He later visits them again, who says their marriage could be considered unstable as they have not been married for long, and is aware that Max contemplated suicide the previous year, to which Max says he has never felt stronger and promised that he would raise Abi. Calvin asks Max to get three character references. Calvin later meets Max and Rainie, saying he will soon have a court date and urges Max to get two character references from friends as he already has a family reference. Calvin later returns and meets Max's referees, his brother, Jack Branning (Scott Maslen), plus Max's former daughter-in-law Stacey Fowler (Lacey Turner) and her husband Martin Fowler (James Bye). When Rainie's mother Cora Cross (Ann Mitchell) offers Rainie the chance to leave Max, relocate to Exeter, run a tearoom and be part of Abi's upbringing with her and Abi's maternal grandmother, Tanya Cross (Jo Joyner), Rainie accepts the offer for £50,000, but contacts Calvin. However, Calvin's colleague, Jamahl Enright (Craig Blake), visits in his place.
Bucko	7 May	Jake Lampert	A man who goes to the E20 club and asks Stacey Fowler (Lacey Turner) and Whitney Dean (Shona McGarty) to sit with him and his friends. Stacey agrees if they buy them a drink. When Bucko touches Stacey's knee and grabs her arm to stop her leaving the table, Stacey's estranged husband, Martin Fowler (James Bye) tells Bucko that Stacey is not interested. Bucko calls Stacey a "skank" so Martin goes to attack Bucko, but hurts his back and cannot move. Later, Bucko tries his luck with Ingrid Solberg (Pernille Broch) as she is about to leave the club, but she rejects him. This leads to Bucko pushing Ingrid's employer, Jack Branning (Scott Maslen) onto a table, and he badly cuts his hand. They fight but it is stopped by Kush Kazemi (Davood Ghadami).
Cherry	15 May	Leigh-Anne Gilbert	A barmaid in a pub in Canning Town where Mick Carter (Danny Dyer), Stuart Highway (Ricky Champ) and Callum "Halfway" Highway (Tony Clay) go drinking. She is new in the pub and Stuart annoys her by calling her Kerry.
Mr Woods	15 May	George Jennings	Shakil Kazemi's (Shaheen Jafargholi) teacher who tells his mother, Carmel Kazemi (Bonnie Langford) that Shakil has a gift for electronic music and has been invited to apply to a music summer school.
Bruno	21 May – 14 September (4 episodes)	Josh Fraser	A gang member who arrives in Walford with two others, looking for Keegan Baker (Zack Morris), who has taken a bicycle belonging to the gang. Bruno enters The Queen Victoria public house but the landlord, Mick Carter (Danny Dyer) denies knowing the person in the photograph that Bruno shows him. The gang cannot find Keegan so they leave. However, Keegan and his friend Shakil Kazemi (Shaheen Jafargholi) are both stabbed by Bruno outside. Shakil dies and Keegan later finds out that Bruno is the attacker, and takes Shakil's mother, Carmel Kazemi (Bonnie Langford) to see him, saying he will take revenge if she wants. Instead, they call the police and Bruno is arrested for murder. Shakil's brother, Kush Kazemi (Davood Ghadami) later informs Carmel that Bruno has pleaded guilty to murder but only because he is proud of the fact and he sees it as a "badge of honour".
Craig	22 May	Nigel Betts	A man who greets Hayley Slater (Katie Jarvis) on the London Underground. She sits next to him and offers him sex for £40, but asks for the cash up front. He pays her but then when they get off the train, she gets back on and mouths "sorry" to him as the doors close. Later, he manages to track her down and says if she had asked for the money, he would have given it to her. She says that she feels bad for stealing from him and offers to return the money, but discovers it has been taken from her by Brianna (Rina Diamond).
Ewan	24 May	Phill Langhorne	A paramedic who takes Keegan Baker (Zack Morris) to hospital after he is stabbed in the neck.
Mr Yang	25 May	David K S Tse	A consultant who pronounces Shakil Kazemi (Shaheen Jafargholi) dead and informs Shakil's family.
Nurse Claire Hart	28 May	Kirsty Woodward	A nurse who tells Hayley Slater (Katie Jarvis) that she is six hours late for her appointment and she cannot have a termination.
Sophie	1 June – 20 September; 9 episodes	Melanie Harris	Bruno's mother, who sees him being arrested for the murder of Shakil Kazemi (Shaheen Jafargholi) and runs over to find out what is happening. Later, Shakil's mother, Carmel Kazemi (Bonnie Langford) approaches Sophie outside the police station and tells her who she is. Sophie apologises for what Bruno did, saying he was more worried about her embarrassing him in front of his friends than being arrested for murder.
PC Shaw	11 June	Carlie Enoch	A police officer who informs Kim Fox-Hubbard (Tameka Empson) that a body has been found matching the description of her missing husband, Vincent Hubbard (Richard Blackwood), and takes Kim to view the body, which is not Vincent's.
Habib Hussain	11 June	Uncredited	A businessman with a chain of 62 restaurants, who speaks at the community centre, and Ian Beale (Adam Woodyatt) meets him.
Rana Hussain	15 June	Taru Devani	The mother of Amal Hussain (Natasha Jayetileke). Credited as Rana.
Gavin Thompson	15 June	Uncredited	A man who has been speaking to Stuart Highway (Ricky Champ) online for three months, thinking he is a 14-year-old girl called Kayleigh. After arranging to meet, Stuart confronts Gavin in public.
Leaf	18 June	Uncredited	A yoga instructor who arranges to meet Linda Carter (Kellie Bright) and Mick Carter (Danny Dyer) for couples yoga; however, Mick does not turn up.
Tommy	18 June	Phil Deguara	A friend of Stuart Highway (Ricky Champ), a paedophile hunter. Tommy poses as a man called Scott and Stuart tells Mick Carter (Danny Dyer) that he is a paedophile who he has been talking to online while pretending to be an underage girl. He asks Mick to confront Scott, but it does not go well when Mick's wife, Linda Carter (Kellie Bright) interrupts them. Stuart then introduces Mick to Tommy, saying he was testing Mick to see if he could handle the situation.
Fred Lewis	22–29 June (4 episodes)	Malcolm Freeman	A man who Stuart Highway (Ricky Champ), a paedophile hunter, has been talking to online pretending to be a teenage girl. Stuart tells his brother, Callum Highway (Tony Clay) to confront Fred, though their friend, Mick Carter (Danny Dyer), is against Halfway getting involved and Fred runs away before the confrontation can happen; however, Halfway and Mick catch up to him, and Fred says he can explain but Halfway allows him to escape. Stuart later asks Halfway to confront Fred again, so Mick and Halfway follow him onto the London Underground, and Mick watches him and thinks he is just an ordinary man. When Fred exits the train, Halfway follows. Later, Stuart sends a video of his confronting Fred, as he took over from Halfway, but Mick tells Stuart that he has no evidence against Fred and he did not admit to anything, so he should let it go. Stuart agrees but then posts the video online anyway. The video shows Fred trying to deny being a paedophile and explain but Stuart interrupts. Stuart and Mick are later questioned by police as Fred is in hospital following an assault that left him with a broken arm, broken ribs and a fractured cheek bone, and the police explain that Fred was searching for his 14-year-old daughter after his wife disappeared with her and he was talking to local girls of the same age to see if they knew where she was.
DC Allingham	29 June	Flaminia Cinque	A police officer who questions Stuart Highway (Ricky Champ) over an assault on Fred Lewis (Malcolm Freeman) the night before. Mick Carter (Danny Dyer) gives Stuart an alibi and Allingham tells Mick that Fred was searching for his daughter online, which is why he was chatting to teenage girls.
Jez	9–19 July (3 episodes)	Billy Cook	Rainie Branning's (Tanya Franks) drug dealer.
Jamahl Enright	13 July– 15 November (2 episodes)	Craig Blake	A social worker and colleague of Calvin Hoskins (Colin Tierney). When Cora Cross (Ann Mitchell) offers her daughter Rainie Branning (Tanya Franks) the chance to leave her husband Max Branning (Jake Wood), relocate to Exeter, run a tearoom and be part of Abi Branning's upbringing with her and Abi's maternal grandmother, Tanya Cross (Jo Joyner), Rainie takes a cheque from Cora for £50,000, but contacts Calvin and Jamahl visits in Calvin's place. He is not expecting Cora to be there and Cora says Rainie is leaving Max to help her raise Abi, to which Jamahl says the courts still have to decide; however, Rainie says she will not leave Max and they reveal Cora's bribe. When Cora decides to withdraw her custody application, Jamahl arrives at Max's with Abi, telling him that Abi is now in his care.
PC Trevor Moore	17–19 July (2 episodes)	Ian Pirie	A drunk man who is ejected from The Queen Victoria public house. He then gets into the cab that Hayley Slater (Katie Jarvis) is driving. Hayley tells him that she is pregnant, but he is asleep. When he wakes, Hayley tells him to get a train as the traffic is not moving. As he gets out, he photographs Hayley's cab licence. He later pays Hayley a visit, revealing himself to be a police officer. He warns her that the police are clamping down on taxi touts and she should get a valid licence, especially as she has "someone else" to think about. (The character is credited as Trevor Moore in his first episode, and PC Trevor Moore in his second.)
Ellie James	19–20 July (2 episodes)	Helen Masters	The director of a golf club of whom Kandice Taylor's (Hannah Spearritt) husband is a member. Kandice agrees to climb Mont Blanc for charity but does not want to so asks her sister, Karen Taylor (Lorraine Stanley) for help. They fake some photos and Kandice agrees to do a video call to Ellie to show her supporters. Ellie appears on the call, unaware that Kandice and Karen have set up a fake tent in Karen's flat, until Karen's son, Keegan Baker (Zack Morris), shouts for his shirt, giving the scam away. Ellie visits Karen and Kandice the next day, and Kandice shows her a cheque for the golf club, which Ellie accepts in exchange for keeping quiet about the scam and giving Kandice's husband a gold membership to the golf club.
Olly	20 July	Uncredited	A delivery man who delivers something to Mick Carter (Danny Dyer).
Francis Bolton	26 July	Daniel Blacker	Francis is a solicitor who represents Tina Carter (Luisa Bradshaw-White) after she is arrested for assaulting Stuart Highway (Ricky Champ) and DI Scott is the police officer who interviews Tina. Tina tells Scott that Stuart "did things" to her, so Francis asks to consult with her before resuming the interview. Scott asks Tina what Stuart did, and she tells him he locked her in a boot. He asks for times, dates and witnesses but she says it was a long time ago. Scott says must have got out of the boot and continued with her life, to which she says she felt unable to say anything at the time. Scott says she waited a long time to retaliate, to which Tina says she was not retaliating but it "just happened", so Scott asks if she is admitting to the attack.
DI Frank Scott	26 July	Robert Curtis	
Rhona	31 July	Lily Knight	A woman who answers an advert from Billy Mitchell (Perry Fenwick) and Jay Brown (Jamie Borthwick), who are looking for a new housemate. Rhona says she is 28, a PA in the City, and goes to the gym a lot so they would hardly see her. She says only wants a houseshare temporarily so she can save up for her own home. She also says she was surprised that the advert said they preferred a female housemate, which confuses Jay as he wanted a male housemate and he realises Billy is trying to find women for him to date.
Dylan Box	2 August – 14 December (5 episodes)	Ricci Harnett	An old friend of Mick Carter (Danny Dyer) and Stuart Highway's (Ricky Champ), who arrives at The Queen Victoria public house where Mick lives, revealing that Stuart once "tortured" him in the same way he did to Mick's aunt, Tina Carter (Luisa Bradshaw-White), and has already reported the incident to the police. This leads to Stuart being arrested. However, Dylan withdraws his statement and tells Tina it is because he is scared of Stuart. He says he is unable to sleep and asks to stay with Tina at the pub and says he has something to "help him sleep". That night, Stuart is shot. Dylan then disappears. After Linda Carter (Kellie Bright) records Stuart confessing that Mick did not shoot him, Stuart forces Dylan to record a confession stating he shot Stuart.
DI Janice Marlowe	2 August – 3 September (2 episodes)	Renée Castle	A police officer who arrests and interviews Stuart Highway (Ricky Champ) over allegations of historical assaults on Dylan Box (Ricci Harnett) and Tina Carter (Luisa Bradshaw-White). DI Marlowe appears again to tell Tina she has been rebailed over an alleged attack on Stuart due to Dylan retracting his statement about Stuart.
Dave	2 August	Will Rastall	A married man who once had a relationship with Hayley Slater (Katie Jarvis). Jean Slater (Gillian Wright) discovers the relationship from Hayley's mother Bev Slater (Ashley McGuire) and believes that Dave is the father of Hayley's unborn baby, so contacts him to arrange a meeting with Hayley so she can tell him. He is not the father, so Hayley tells him she has gonorrhoea and he should tell his wife.
Biggie	6 August 2018 – 24 January 2019 (12 episodes)	Uncredited	A gang member with Jagger Rawley (Aaron Thomas Ward) and Stix Redman (Kasey McKellar). They are seen in a fast-food restaurant by Dennis Rickman (Bleu Landau), selling mobile phones, and Biggie talks about a girl he was with and had to jump out of her window when her father arrived. Biggie is present with the gang several times after this.
Bunhead	6 August 2018 – 21 February 2019 (19 episodes)	Uncredited	A gang member with Jagger Rawley (Aaron Thomas Ward), Stix Redman (Kasey McKellar)and Evie Steele (Sophia Capasso).
Cody	14 August	Jacob Avery	A gang member with Jagger Rawley (Aaron Thomas Ward) and Stix Redman (Kasey McKellar). Keanu Taylor (Danny Walters) sees Stix giving Cody a bag and follows him to the garage where he works. Cody breaks in and Keanu confronts him, threatening to throw him into the inspection pit. Cody spits in Keanu's face so Keanu pushes him in the pit, but his fall is broken and he is able to leave after Hayley Slater (Katie Jarvis) threatens to kill him if he goes to the police.
Lisha	16 August 2018 – 21 February 2019 (5 episodes)	Uncredited	A gang member with Jagger Rawley and Stix Redman (Kasey McKellar). She films it when Stix attacks Dennis Rickman and shuts him in the garage's inspection pit.
Karl	20 August	Chris McCausland	A blind man who plays chess against Bernadette Taylor (Clair Norris) and wins, but she beats him in their second game.
Talia	21–23 August (2 episodes)	Helen Daniels	A waitress at the opening of Walford East restaurant. She serves drinks and tells Kush Kazemi (Davood Ghadami) to take two beers. Talia notices when Kush gets drunk and argues with his girlfriend, Denise Fox (Diane Parish), and at the end of the night, Talia finds Kush with a bottle of alcohol she was saving for herself. They share it and then leave the restaurant together. Kush's mother, Carmel Kazemi (Bonnie Langford), catches Talia leaving the next morning.
Sia	21–27 August (3 episodes)	Uncredited	A gang member with Jagger Rawley and Stix Redman (Kasey McKellar).
Mrs Portelli	23 August	Uncredited	A patient of dentist Adam Bateman (Stephen Rahman-Hughes).
Naomi, Gregory, Benny, Eleanor, Zaria and Jade	24 August	Uncredited	Players in a chess tournament.
DC Thomas Summers	6–7 September (2 episodes)	Matt Emery	A police officer who interviews Callum Highway (Tony Clay) over the shooting of his brother, Stuart Highway (Ricky Champ), and then interviews Tina Carter (Luisa Bradshaw-White) and Linda Carter (Kellie Bright) over the incident. He later brings a forensic report to his colleague, DCI Peter Arthurs.
Chris Pickard	10 September	Lucas Hare	A solicitor present when Linda Carter (Kellie Bright) is questioned by DCI Peter Arthurs over the shooting of Stuart Highway (Ricky Champ).
DC Luke Williams	10 September	Uncredited	A police officer who is present when Linda Carter (Kellie Bright) is questioned by DCI Peter Arthurs over the shooting of Stuart Highway (Ricky Champ).
PC Green	10 September	Joanne Seymour	A police officer who tells DCI Peter Arthurs that the canal has been searched for something that Linda Carter (Kellie Bright) disposed of.
Barker	13 September	Ian Alexander	A man who shakes Mick Carter's (Danny Dyer) hand, after Stuart Highway (Ricky Champ) is shot. Barker assumes Mick did it and says that Stuart, a former paedophile hunter, once framed him and he spent three months on remand.
Andrew Austin	14–21 September (2 episodes)	Evan Milton	A solicitor who is present when Mick Carter (Danny Dyer) is questioned following his arrest on suspicion of attempted murder after Stuart Highway (Ricky Champ) was shot. Andrew also speaks to Mick's family before Mick has a bail hearing, but Mick's mother, Shirley Carter (Linda Henry), hires Ritchie Scott (Sian Webber) and sends Andrew away.
Dr Sherwood	17–18 September (2 episodes)	Kate Victors	
Tom	17 September	Uncredited	A barman in E20.
Pete Clifford	21 September	Jonathan Hansler	A radio journalist from Talk East who interviews Carmel Kazemi (Bonnie Langford) about her son, Shakil Kazemi (Shaheen Jafargholi), who was stabbed and killed. Carmel's other son, Kush Kazemi (Davood Ghadami), hears the interview and stops it Pete says he heard Shakil was involved in crime, which Carmel denies, and asks how Carmel failed her son.
Sam	21 September– 22 October (2 episodes)	Ashley Chin	A man who works for Double Edge Crime, a charity that cares for victims and perpetrators of knife crime. He asks Carmel Kazemi (Bonnie Langford), whose son, Shakil Kazemi (Shaheen Jafargholi), was stabbed and killed, to tell her story in schools around the country, and she immediately agrees. Sam later attends a session on knife crime with Carmel in Walford.
Dan	24–28 September (4 episodes)	Emeson Nwolie	A prison officer at Dickens Hill prison. He is credited as "prison officer" but is named in dialogue.
Bob Matthews	24–28 September (4 episodes)	James Bowers	Bob is Mick Carter's (Danny Dyer) cellmate in Dickens Hill prison, while Fraser is an inmate in who is considered "top dog". Mick wants use of a mobile phone, so Fraser gets him to do him a favour. Fraser is in contact with Mick's former friend, Stuart Highway (Ricky Champ), who calls Fraser and tells him that Mick is a paedophile, which Fraser announces to his fellow inmates. Bob prevents an attack on Mick, and Fraser then gets Mick to smuggle drugs into the prison by meeting Tessa (Annie Cooper) and to hide them in Bob's belongings. Two prison officers arrive to search the cell but Bob realises what is happening and finds the drugs, flushing them away before they are found. Fraser then orders Mick to attack Bob but Mick refuses to do so. Fraser later witnesses a visit between Mick and his wife, Linda Carter (Kellie Bright), during which Linda becomes convinced that Mick is guilty of shooting Stuart, so Fraser informs Stuart of this.
Fraser Philips	24 September – 2 October (5 episodes)	Joseph Alessi	
Muski	24 September 2018 – 20 August 2019 (5 episodes)	Patrick Cremin	A police officer who is a former colleague of Jack Branning (Scott Maslen). Jack asks him to find anything bad he can about another officer, Ray Kelly (Sean Mahon).
Tessa	25–28 September (3 episodes)	Annie Cooper	An acquaintance of Stuart Highway (Ricky Champ), who pretends to have moved into the area and asks Linda Carter (Kellie Bright) about childcare, who tells her about her son Ollie Carter's nursery. Tessa visits Linda's husband, Mick Carter (Danny Dyer), in prison, posing as his wife, and Mick is given drugs from Tessa through a kiss to smuggle in and she threatens him with Ollie.
Andrea Rooney	25–28 September (3 episodes)	Geraldine Alexander	Andrea is the head of Walford High School's sixth form, whom Sonia Fowler (Natalie Cassidy) meets with when her daughter, Bex Fowler (Jasmine Armfield), wants to leave school because of her struggling to come to terms with Shakil Kazemi's (Shaheen Jafargholi) death. Andrea believes that with more confidence, Bex could aim for Oxbridge and gives Sonia some prospectuses. When Andrea and Sonia meet with Bex, Bex insists she does not want help with school and does not want to go to university. When Bex goes to see Andrea, Andrea shows Bex an article on Libby Fox (Belinda Owusu) going to either of the Oxbridge universities and offers to talk about Shakil.
Dave	25 September	Uncredited	An inmate in Dickens Hill prison.
Trent Meadows	27–28 September (2 episodes)	Phil Zimmerman	An inmate in Dickens Hill prison who is nicknamed "Fingers".
Steve	27 September	Uncredited	A man who is in the same hospital room as Stuart Highway (Ricky Champ).
Jeff Reynolds	28 September – 4 October (3 episodes)	Andres Williams	A man who sees Ray Kelly (Sean Mahon), but calls him Simon, insisting he knows him, but Ray denies knowing him because he is with his stepson, Hunter Owen (Charlie Winter). Ray later apologises to Jeff, who tells Ray he is looking at a flat locally, but Ray later warns him to leave; Jeff does not take Ray seriously, so Ray beats him up. Jeff asks his flat deposit back from Jack Branning (Scott Maslen), but Jack refuses and he guesses Ray has influenced Jeff's decision.
Gina	1 October	Jennifer Matter	A customer at E20 nightclub, who a drunken, underage Hunter Owen (Charlie Winter) flirts with to impress his stepfather, Ray Kelly (Sean Mahon). Ray apologises to Gina on Hunter's behalf when he embarrasses himself and Ray leaves the club with Gina.
Vix	5 October 2018– 12 February 2019 (4 episodes)	Lukwesa Mwamba	An associate of Jagger Rawley (Aaron Thomas Ward). Jagger stands his girlfriend Tiffany Butcher (Maisie Smith) up to sort out an issue supposedly about SIM cards and Jagger meets Vix. Tiffany sees them together and Jagger explains that Vix is looking after the SIM cards, but has to arrange details with her. Tiffany interrupts Jagger and Vix, demanding to be a part of it all. Tiffany later discovers that she is looking after drugs. When Tiffany befriends Evie Steele (Sophia Capasso) and agrees to her idea to find Jagger somewhere to stay to work of a debt, Jagger turns up at Ted Murray's (Christopher Timothy's flat with Vix and others, Vix promises they will be quiet. When Tiffany demands they leave, she rejects the offer to go with Vix, Evie and Jagger, but later changes her mind. Evie later ejects Vix from the gang.
Cash	8 October	Kadell Herida	An associate of Jagger Rawley (Aaron Thomas Ward), to whom his girlfriend Tiffany Butcher (Maisie Smith) has to deliver drugs. On the London Underground, a young man claiming to be Cash approaches Tiffany and asks for the drugs, though Tiffany is apprehensive and reluctantly gives them to him. Jagger later praises Tiffany.
Ross Swinden	8 November 2018 – 5 April 2019 (14 episodes)	Ossian Luke	Three school friends of Martin Fowler (James Bye), with whom he meets at a school reunion. Ruby Allen (Louisa Lytton), a friend of Martin's wife, Stacey Fowler (Lacey Turner), flirts with them, especially Ross, and she stays with him in the club after Martin and Stacey leave. The next morning, Ruby tells Stacey that she went back to Ross's flat afterwards but felt uncomfortable there; she ended up in Ross's bedroom where he kissed her and had sex with him because she felt like she owed him. She then reveals that she passed out and when she woke up, Matt was in bed with her; Stacey says she was raped because she did not say "yes", despite Ruby saying she did not say "no". Meanwhile, Ross tells Martin he and Matt had sex with Ruby: Ruby kissed him and never told him to stop, and she asked if Matt liked her, after which Matt had sex with her too. Martin later warns Ross that Ruby is alleging she was raped by Matt and Ross wants Martin's backing. After this, Martin's friend, Kush Kazemi (Davood Ghadami) shows him a photo from the reunion showing Ruby and Matt kissing; Martin tells Stacey that Ruby has lied but Ruby tells Stacey that Matt was attracted to her and she used him to make Ross jealous, but she did not want or agree to sex with Matt. Ruby decides to report the rape to the police, Stacey and Martin give witness statements to the police and though Martin agrees with Stacey not to tell them about the photo of Ruby and Matt kissing, he does so anyway. Ross later shows a text from Ruby to Matt that she sent the morning after the rape saying she is fine, but Martin says it proves nothing, and Ross fears his life is over if Ruby is believed. Stacey is unhappy when she finds Martin in the pub with Ross and Matt and Stacey orders for them not to be served; Martin attempts to get them to leave so they do not violate their bail and their identities as the rapists reported in the newspaper is exposed. When Glenn arrives at the pub, Martin gets him to leave and when Glenn refers to Ruby as a liar, Ruby publicly confronts him.
Matt Clarkson	8 November 2018 – 5 April 2019 (14 episodes)	Mitchell Hunt	
Glenn Neyland	8–29 November (3 episodes)	Todd Von Joel	
Jimmy McLoughlin	8 October	Uncredited	A man who went to the same school as Martin Fowler (James Bye) and attends a reunion in the E20 nightclub.
Maddie Wright	11 October 2018– 4 February 2019 (12 episodes)	Robyn Page	Maddie and Jake are the secret wife and son of Ray Kelly (Sean Mahon), who is known to them as Simon Wright. Maddie and an ill Jake are tracked down by Ray's former wife, Mel Owen (Tamzin Outhwaite), with whom Ray has recently reconciled, on the hospital's children's ward. Mel visits the hospital again and befriends Maddie, subtly questioning her relationship with Ray and about Jake, who Ray wanted to call Ray. Mel books Maddie as a personal trainer for a session and tells Maddie about her upcoming wedding to Ray before going to The Vic to discuss their relationships with Ray further.
Jake Wright	11–12 October (2 episodes)	River Archer	
Dr Khoury	16 October	Shamir Dawood	A GP who sees Dot Branning (June Brown) when she is experiencing dizziness.
DS Hyde	18 October	Sacharissa Claxton	Police officers who interview Stacey Fowler (Lacey Turner) and Martin Fowler (James Bye) about the alleged rape of Ruby Allen (Louisa Lytton). Hyde interviews Stacey while Anderson interviews Martin.
DC Anderson	18 October	Simon Ludders	Police officers who interview Stacey Fowler (Lacey Turner) and Martin Fowler (James Bye) about the alleged rape of Ruby Allen (Louisa Lytton). Hyde interviews Stacey while Anderson interviews Martin.
Mary	18–19 October (2 episodes)	Rosalind Adler	A woman who Robbie Jackson (Dean Gaffney) spills a drink on in The Queen Victoria public house during his birthday party. He offers to buy her another drink and she flirts with him. They later end up having sex during the party.
Lewis	22 October	Malachi Pullar-Latchman	A youth who attends Carmel Kazemi's (Bonnie Langford) session on knife crime. Carmel notices Lewis is uncomfortable and her persistence on encouraging him to talk leads to his walking out. Carmel follows him and realises he is carrying a knife and Lewis says he needs it to defend himself and that Carmel will not change anything: people will still be killed and everyone sees her son, Shakil Kazemi (Shaheen Jafargholi), who was stabbed and killed, as "lame" for not carrying a knife himself.
Mr Reid	23 October	Darryl Foster	A consultant who sees Dr. Harold Legg (Leonard Fenton) about his pancreatic cancer, which is in the advanced stages to be removed, informing him it has not spread significantly. Dr Reid brings up chemotherapy, which could shrink the tumour. (Credited as "Consultant".)
Lou	6–26 November (2 episodes)	Luke Hope	Lou is a jeweller, who visits Mel Owen (Tamzin Outhwaite) and Ray Kelly (Sean Mahon) to pick a diamond for their wedding ring. Lou meets up with Mel, who opts to keep a cheaper, glass version of her wedding ring and tells him to sell the real one.
Sarah	8 November	Deborah Carroll	Sarah is a nurse and Dr Daniel Zainuddin is a doctor at Walford General Hospital. Mariam Ahmed (Indira Joshi) and Arshad Ahmed (Madhav Sharma) bring Hayley Slater's (Katie Jarvis) baby to the hospital, where they tell Sarah she is not named yet and her mother is on the way. Hayley arrives as they are being called to see Dr Zainuddin. Dr Zainuddin says the baby is fine as sometimes babies can swallow blood during the birth and bring it up later. He questions Hayley about how she is due to her leaving hospital early after she gave birth. Dr Zainuddin requests Hayley and her baby remain at the hospital until she has a feed. Hayley has a meeting with Dr Zainuddin and her social worker, Hilary Taylor, with the Ahmeds and her cousin Kat Moon (Jessie Wallace).
Dr Daniel Zainuddin	8 November	Jamie Zubairi	
Mr Carl Rapley	8 November 2018– 28 November 2019 (4 episodes)	Mark Oosterveen	Max Branning's (Jake Wood) new solicitor (credited as Carl). He talks to Max about the custody of his granddaughter Abi Branning and says Max is doing everything right. After Abi is nearly hit by a van when she is in the care of her great-grandmother, Cora Cross (Ann Mitchell), who also wants custody, Carl assures Max it can be included verbally in court. He later reappears (credited as Mr Carl Rapley) to represent Linda Carter (Kellie Bright) after she crashes into Shelley's (Maria Louis) car. Linda pleads guilty and is given a driving ban and is required to complete a driving safety course.
Joseph Summers	12 November	Kieran Gough	A counsellor (credited as Mr Summers; his first name is shown on his business card) who sees Keegan Baker (Zack Morris) when his struggle to deal with his being stabbed, as well as his best friend Shakil Kazemi (Shaheen Jafargholi) who died, becomes apparent. Keegan gives him a frosty reception initially, but his mother Karen Taylor (Lorraine Stanley) persuades him to try.
DC Jane Kaminski	13–15 November (2 episodes)	Charlotte Fields	After Max Branning (Jake Wood) takes his granddaughter Abi Branning on his wife's, Rainie Branning (Tanya Franks), instructions to resolve her feud with her mother Cora Cross (Ann Mitchell), Kaminski and a colleague arrive at Max's house and inform him that they are removing Abi to a place of safety. When Rainie is hit over the head by a frying pan by Cora, Kaminiski visits Rainie in hospital, asking her what happened.
DC Maxine Phillips	19–27 November (2 episodes)	Sandra Teles	A police officer who visits Ruby Allen (Louisa Lytton), who has reported a rape to the police. Phillips shows Ruby a photo given to the police of Ruby kissing her alleged rapist on the night before it happened. When Ruby reads nasty comments about herself online, she contacts Phillips, who tells her no action can be taken immediately as Ruby is not named or threatened, but advises Ruby to take screenshots of the comments and Ruby orders her to leave.
PC Paul Campbell	22 November 2018– 6 December 2022 (8 episodes)	Jack Gogarty	A police officer that is first called to The Queen Victoria public house when Shirley Carter (Linda Henry) is refusing to leave after asked by Linda Carter (Kellie Bright). He later investigates Jean Slater's (Gillian Wright) disappearance. After Jean's daughter, Stacey Fowler (Lacey Turner), thinks the police are not doing enough to find Jean, she calls Campbell to say Jean contacted her and is suicidal. Campbell visits her and says they can find out where the call was made from but when Stacey hesitates, he asks if Jean really called so Stacey admits she did not but says Jean has been suicidal before. Campbell tells her that wasting police time will not help them find her and leaves.
Tony	26 November	Mark Kempner	When Kat Moon (Jessie Wallace) goes out on her motorbike, she visits a café that her father, Charlie Slater (Derek Martin), used to take her to when she was a child and he worked as a cab driver. Kat meets Tony, who remembers her and Charlie and they bond over their memories. Tony takes Kat to his local pub, The Wellington, where they see Tony and Charlie's friend, Maurice, but he is reluctant to meet Kat. When Kat demands to know Maurice's problem with her, he tells her that one night he was with Charlie and her uncle Harry Slater (Michael Elphick), and Harry said he "knew how to shut her up". Maurice realised that he was talking about sexually abusing Kat and hoped it was not true, but could not tell Kat if Charlie had heard this or not. Kat's husband, Alfie Moon (Shane Richie), brings Maurice to see Kat a few weeks later, and Maurice admits that Charlie did not hear what Harry said and apologises, saying he was drunk when he told Kat, and admits he never really liked Charlie and saw the lie as a way of getting back at Charlie but did not think how it would affect Kat, so he apologises.
Maurice	26 November – 20 December (2 episodes)	Eric Richard	
Jodie Kelly	4–7 December (3 episodes)	Katie Buchholz	
Philomena	6 December	Pamela Binns	A woman on a video shown by Alfie Moon (Shane Richie) to advertise his Blue Moon Funerals business.
Nicola Kelly	7 December 2018 – 31 January 2019 (5 episodes)	Alexandra Gilbreath	The second and only lawful wife of Ray Kelly (Sean Mahon).
Rocky	11 December	David Stoller	A man who delivers a fireplace to Alfie Moon (Shane Richie).
Alaina Wilson	14 December	Portia Booroff	Stuart Highway's (Ricky Champ) solicitor when he is arrested for perverting the course of justice.
Jimmy	24 December 2018 – 1 August 2019 (2 episodes)	Chris Kyriacou	A paramedic who arrives when Kim Fox-Hubbard (Tameka Empson) gives birth.
DC David White	26 December 2018– 3 October 2019 (2 episodes)	Jon House	A police officer who arrives at the Slaters' house when a fatality is reported. Kat Moon (Jessie Wallace) says her husband, Alfie Moon (Shane Richie) died after falling down the stairs, but when she goes to show DC White the body, Alfie has gone. He later arrests Phil Mitchell (Steve McFadden) after her assaults Jonno Highway (Richard Graham) for making homophobic comments to Ben Mitchell (Max Bowden) and Callum Highway (Tony Clay).
