= Sean Mahon =

Irish stage and screen actor

Seán Mahon is an Irish stage and screen actor. He is known for playing Nicky Giblin in the Broadway production of The Seafarer, Richard Hannay in the Broadway production of The 39 Steps and Michael Hess (the lost son) in the award-winning feature film, Philomena. In 2014 he was nominated for a best lead actor award for his portrayal of maverick cop Brian McGonigle in the Irish drama Red Rock. On 9 July 2018, the BBC announced that Mahon would be joining the cast of EastEnders in 2018 to play Ray Kelly, the ex-husband of Mel Owen.

== Filmography ==
=== Films ===
Year	Title	Role	Notes
2002	It Could Happen	Doctor	Short
2003	Hulk	Comanche Pilot #1	
2003	This Vicious Minute	Husband	Short
2005	Mr. & Mrs. Smith	Lucky	
2005	A.M.D.G.: A World Is Not Enough	Ignatius Loyola	Short
2006	Eragon		Voice
2007	Reign of the Gargoyles	Major James Deacon	TV movie
2008	Rend	Thomas	Short
2010	Fair Game	CIA Analyst #1	
2010	Exit the Castle		Short
2011	Higher Ground	Liam Donovan	
2012	Dark Shadows	Collinsport Cop	
2012	Zero Dark Thirty	Prince Pilot 52	Uncredited
2013	Philomena	Michael Hess	
2014	The Legend of Longwood	Marc Dumonceau	
2016	The Last Treasure Hunt	Ernie	
2016	Anthropoid	Dr. Eduard	
2018	Don't Go	Dave Pearse	
2019	End of Sentence	Andrew	
2021	The Cursed	John Adam	
2024	High Tide	Bob	

=== Television ===
Year	Title	Role	Notes
2002	Angel	Truck Driver	"Forgiving" (season 3, episode 17)
2002	The Agency	Delaney	"Elite Meat to Eat" (season 2, episode 11)
2003	Everwood	Pseudo Patient	"Blind Faith" (season 2, episode 6)
2003	ER	Community Hospital Doctor	"Death and Taxes" (season 10, episode 7)
2003-2004	Line of Fire	Carl Sampson	4 episodes
2008	As the World Turns	George	Episode #1.13387
2008	Fringe	Bartender	"Safe" (season 1, episode 10)
2010	Army Wives	Professor George Kelling	"New Orders" (season 4, episode 9)
2010	Then We Got Help!	Terry	20 episodes
2014-2015	Red Rock (TV series)	Brian McGonigle	
2016	American Experience	Senator Roscoe Conkling	"Death of a President" (Season 28, episode 3)
2018-2019	EastEnders	Ray Kelly	Regular Character

=== Video games ===
Year	Title	Voice role	Notes
2006	Call of Duty 3	Peterson	
