= Indira Joshi (actor) =

Indian actress (born 1942)

Indira Joshi (born 2 March 1942) is an Indian actor whose career has included playing Mariam Ahmed in EastEnders and Madhuri Kumar in The Kumars at No. 42, appearing in Grumpy Old Women. and reading children's stories in Jackanory.

Her two brothers Joe L. Joshi and Jai Hind Joshi attended Bishop Cotton School (Shimla) in India, while she attended its sister school.

She has two sons, Liev Shiva Dominic also known as Thubten his monk name, and Krishna Dylan.

She has recorded audiobooks including Madhur Jaffrey's Climbing the Mango Tree.
