= Ifan Meredith =

Welsh actor

- Born: 1976 (age 49–50); Cilcain, Flintshire, Wales
- Occupation: Actor
- Relatives: Meredith Edwards (grandfather)

Ifan Meredith (born 1976) is a Welsh actor who has appeared on television and stage.

== Early life and career ==
Born in Cilcain, Flintshire, Wales, Meredith was from an acting family. His father Ioan Meredith and brother Rhys are both actors, and his grandfather was Meredith Edwards. He attended the Royal Central School of Speech and Drama.

Meredith played Joe, the survivor of a bomb blast at an iconic city building, in Always Orange. In 2012, to mark the 100th anniversary of the Titanic disaster, Meredith played Fifth Officer Harold Lowe in the Julian Fellowes miniseries Titanic.

== Filmography ==
- 1997: The Mill on the Floss (TV movie)
- 1997: Metroland
- 1997: Gold (TV series, 2 episodes)
- 1998: The Grand (TV series, 10 episodes)
- 1998: Death was faster ( A Mind to Kill , TV series, episode 3x01)
- 1999: Great Expectations (TV movie)
- 1999: Warriors – Mission in Bosnia ( Warriors , TV series)
- 2000: Peak Practice (TV series, episode 10x05)
- 2002: Where the Heart Is (TV series, 2 episodes)
- 2002: Sirens of Darkness ( Sirens , TV movie)
- 2002: Dr. Jekyll and Mr. Hyde (TV movie)
- 2003: The Royals (TV series, episode 2x05)
- 2004: Holby City (TV series, episode 6x25)
- 2004: Murder City (TV series, episode 1x02)
- 2005: Ripley Under Ground
- 2006: Victoria Cross Heroes (TV documentary series, episode 1x02)
- 2006: Doctors (TV documentary series, episode 7x138)
- 2011: Inspector Barnaby ( Midsomer Murders , TV series, episode 14x02)
- 2012: BBC Learning: True Stories (TV series, episode 1x01)
- 2012: Titanic (TV series, 4 episodes)
- 2012: The Dark Side of Science ( Dark Matters: Twisted But True , TV documentary series, 2 episodes, various roles)
- 2015: Doctors (TV documentary series, episode 17x138)
- 2016: Sound of Joy (short film)
- 2017: Porn Again (miniseries, 4 episodes; also production)
- 2017: Operation Dunkirk (Operation Dunkirk)
- 2018: EastEnders (TV series, 3 episodes)
- 2019: Absentia (TV series, episode 2x03)
