= Peter Beale =

Fictional character from EastEnders

- EastEnders character
- Thomas Law as Peter Beale (2025)
- Portrayed by: Francis Brittin-Snell (1993–1996); Alex Stevens (1997–1998); Joseph Shade (1998–2004); James Martin (2004–2006); Thomas Law (2006–2010, 2023–present); Ben Hardy (2013–2015); Dayle Hudson (2020–2022)
- Duration: 1993–2010, 2013–2015, 2020–present
- First appearance: Episode 926; 16 December 1993
- Introduced by: Leonard Lewis (1993); Jane Harris (1997); Lorraine Newman (2013); Jon Sen (2020); Chris Clenshaw (2023)
- Spin-off appearances: The Queen Vic Quiz Night (2020)
- Crossover appearances: Emmerdale (2021)
- Dayle Hudson as Peter Beale (2022)
In-universe information
- Occupation: Student; Market trader; Drug dealer; Barman; Personal trainer
- Family: Beale/Branning
- Father: Ian Beale
- Mother: Cindy Beale
- Stepfather: Max Branning
- Stepmother: Mel Owen; Laura Beale; Jane Beale; Sharon Watts
- Sisters: Lucy Beale
- Half-brothers: Steven Beale; Bobby Beale
- Half-sisters: Cindy Williams; Gina Knight; Anna Knight
- Wife: Lauren Branning (2025–present)
- Sons: Louie Beale; Jimmy Beale
- Grandfathers: Pete Beale; Tom Williams
- Grandmothers: Kathy Beale; Bev Williams
- Uncles: David Wicks; Ben Mitchell
- Aunts: Donna Ludlow; Gina Williams
- Nieces: Abi Branning; Beth Williams
- First cousins: Bianca Jackson; Joe Wicks; Karen Wicks; Lexi Pearce
- Other relatives: Pauline Fowler; Mark Fowler; Michelle Fowler; Martin Fowler; Bex Fowler; Vicki Fowler; Mark Fowler Jnr; Liam Butcher; Tiffany Butcher; Morgan Butcher

Peter Beale is a fictional character from the BBC soap opera EastEnders. Peter makes his first appearance in episode 926, originally broadcast on 16 December 1993. Peter has been played by seven actors since being introduced in 1993. Francis Brittin-Snell played the role from 1993 to 1996, followed by Alex Stevens from 1997 to 1998 and Joseph Shade from 1998 to 2004. James Martin took over from 2004 to 2006. He was played by Thomas Law from 2006 to 2010, when the character left the series. In April 2013, it was announced that Peter would return, played by Ben Hardy, who made his first appearance on 7 June 2013. Hardy announced his departure from the role in November 2014, making his final appearance on 24 February 2015.

In December 2019, it was announced the character would be returning, played by Dayle Hudson. Peter returned on 18 February 2020, during the show's 35th anniversary week. In June 2022, it was announced that the character had been axed, and Hudson's final scenes aired on 14 July 2022. Peter made an unannounced return in the episode broadcast on 22 June 2023, with Thomas Law reprising the role. It was announced he would be making a permanent return to the series, and his return aired on 22 August 2023.

Peter's storylines have included being involved in a car accident, a turbulent relationship with Lauren Branning (Madeline Duggan/Jacqueline Jossa), discovering that his younger half-brother Bobby Beale (Eliot Carrington/Clay Milner Russell) murdered his twin sister Lucy Beale (Hetti Bywater), and disowning his family when they cover up her murder, having a son, Louie, with Lauren, taking over Ian's businesses, affairs with his girlfriend Ash Panesar's (Gurlaine Kaur Garcha) mother, Suki Panesar (Balvinder Sopal), and Bobby's girlfriend Dana Monroe (Barbara Smith), being comatose after suffering injuries in a fire from Kathy's café, reconciling with Lauren, being a suspect in the "Who Attacked Cindy?" storyline, and supporting his second son Jimmy Beale's diagnosis of coloboma, leaving him severely sight-impaired.

== Casting and development ==
Peter was introduced in 1993 along with his twin sister Lucy, and was originally played by Francis Brittin-Snell as a baby and toddler from 1993 to 1996. In 1997, the role was given to Alex Stevens and he played Peter until 1998. Joseph Shade took over until 2004 and James Martin played him from 2004 until 2006. It was announced on 17 August 2006 that actor Thomas Law had been cast as Peter. Law said of the role: "I couldn't believe it when I heard that I got the part, I'm really excited as I am a big fan of EastEnders." He made his first appearance on 31 August 2006. He is described on the EastEnders website as being laid back, and Ian's "golden boy".

In 2007, Peter was part of a storyline which saw him and his father, as well as Phil Mitchell (Steve McFadden) and Ben Mitchell (Charlie Jones), involved in a car accident, when the Range Rover they were travelling in crashed into a lake. The scenes cost £1 million to produce, and external scenes were filmed in Surrey over four days, with underwater scenes being filmed in a specially designed stunt tank. The scenes aired on 18 May 2007. It was not known to viewers if Peter would survive at the time. Law praised the scenes, calling them "fantastic".

In November 2010, it was reported that Peter would leave EastEnders at the end of the year, with a possible, yet unconfirmed, return for 2011. In storylines, Peter is accused of pushing Glenda Mitchell (Glynis Barber) down her stairs. Law felt that Peter would not be strong enough to do it and it would not be in his character, though he feels backed into a corner. Peter made his final appearance on 24 December 2010. When asked if he could return, Law said, "I don't know. They're leaving the door open. That's all I can tell you."

On 19 April 2013, it was reported that Peter was to return to the series, played by Ben Hardy. He said of his casting: "I'm really excited to be joining the fantastic cast of EastEnders—a show which my family have watched for years. I can't wait to step into the shoes of a character with so much history and am looking forward to getting stuck in." Executive producer Lorraine Newman said, "Ben's a wonderful addition to the EastEnders cast and I am sure he will be popular with the audience. Having Peter back in the Beale fold helps cement the next generation of the Beale clan, a family who exist at the true heart of the show. Ian's wonderful relationship with Denise and the inclusion of Lucy, Peter and Bobby in the household will reinvigorate the clan with vibrancy and energy. I am really looking forward to seeing them all together on screen." Hardy left the role in 2015. A year later, he explained that he decided to leave so he did not regret "not trying for his dreams".

On 18 December 2019, it was announced that Peter would be returning to the show, with Dayle Hudson becoming the seventh actor to portray the character. Of his casting, Hudson said that he was "very excited to see what the future holds for [Peter]". Executive producer Jon Sen added that Dayle is a "talented actor who captures [Peter's] complexity perfectly. Hudson explained that upon returning to Walford, Peter intends to "build bridges" with his family. He stated that the relationship between Peter and Bobby is "always going to be strained", due to Bobby being responsible for Lucy's death, but that it forms an "interesting element in their relationship". He returned on 18 February 2020.

On 22 June 2023, Peter made an unannounced return to the show, with Thomas Law reprising the role. Of his return, Law said that it was "an absolute delight" to come back and that he couldn't wait to "explore the character." Executive Producer Chris Clenshaw added that he was "thrilled to welcome [Law] back to the role of Peter Beale" and that the return would be "nothing less than explosive."

== Storylines ==
=== 1993–2010 ===
Peter and his twin sister Lucy Beale (Eva Brittin-Snell) are born off-screen on 9 December 1993, to Ian (Adam Woodyatt) and Cindy Beale (Michelle Collins). Peter is named after his paternal grandfather, Pete Beale (Peter Dean), who dies on the day Lucy and Peter are born, from a car accident with his girlfriend, Rose Chapman (Petra Markham). In 1996, Cindy hires a hitman to kill Ian, but he survives and fearing she will be arrested, she goes on the run with Peter and her eldest son, Steven Beale (Stuart Stevens), but she is unable to get Lucy. Ian hires a private investigator, who locates Cindy in Italy and Ian, his stepfather Phil Mitchell (Steve McFadden) and Phil's brother Grant Mitchell (Ross Kemp), go to Italy and take Steven and Peter. Cindy returns to Walford with her boyfriend, Nick Holland (Dominic Taylor), and she wins custody of Steven, Lucy and Peter, but is soon arrested for attempted murder and is remanded in custody, so the children remain with Ian. In November 1998, Cindy supposedly dies of complications after giving birth to hers and Nick's daughter Cindy Williams (Eva Wortley and Cydney Parker). Steven, Lucy and Peter grow up with various stepmothers: Melanie Healy (Tamzin Outhwaite) splits from Ian straight after marrying him on Millennium Eve due to her finding out Lucy (now Casey Anne Rothery) was not 'sick' with cancer as initially feared and in July 2003, Ian's wife, Laura Beale (Hannah Waterman) gives birth to hers and Ian's son, Bobby Beale (Kevin Curran), who is Peter and Lucy's younger half-brother, and they separate when Ian denies paternity. Laura later dies in 2004.

Peter is injured in a fair ground collapse in June 2004 but is saved from the wreckage by Den Watts (Leslie Grantham) and his son Dennis Rickman (Nigel Harman). Ian meets Jane Collins (Laurie Brett) at this fair and Lucy and Peter struggle to bond with Jane due to Ian's past relationships, but Ian's aunt, Pauline Fowler (Wendy Richard), convinces them to give her a chance. In May 2007, Ian and Peter go camping with Phil and his son, Ben Mitchell (Charlie Jones). On the drive home, there is a car accident and Peter and Ben are trapped in the car. Ben is conscious but Peter is knocked unconscious. Peter and Ben are rescued by Phil.

A budding athlete, who is Peter's PE teacher, tells Ian that Peter could compete in the 2012 Olympics. Keen for Peter to succeed, Ian begins putting pressure on him to train hard and is unhappy when Peter is distracted by Lauren Branning (Madeline Duggan), who Peter begins dating in December 2007. Lauren's father, Max Branning (Jake Wood), is also unhappy, especially when he catches Peter and Lauren playing truant and drinking alcohol and Max orders Peter to end the relationship in October 2008 but Peter tries standing up to him. Max angrily grabs Peter and throttles him so Peter tells Lauren that Max was behind their breakup, making Lauren so angry that she tries to run Max over. Peter later gives evidence in court, and when Lauren returns home (after being found not guilty of attempting to murder Max) in April 2009, Peter settles his differences with Max and declares his love for Lauren. Peter tries to look impressive by lying that he and Lauren have had sex in the allotments. Lucy (now Melissa Suffield) and Jay Brown (Jamie Borthwick) quickly spread this rumour at school and Lauren dumps Peter. Peter and Lauren reconcile and Lauren tells Peter she is ready to have sex. However, Lauren's mother, Tanya Branning (Jo Joyner), finds the condoms Peter and Lauren are using and Lauren's older half-brother, Bradley Branning (Charlie Clements), overhears Peter talking about it. The next day, Peter and Lauren try to see each other in secret but fail. Peter tells Max that he loves Lauren and Max finally accepts it.

At a party, Peter meets Zsa Zsa Carter (Emer Kenny) and they end up kissing, which Lauren sees. Lauren slaps Peter and Zsa Zsa, causing an argument. Peter discovers Leon Small (Sam Attwater) slept with Lucy while he was seeing Zsa Zsa, causing a violent confrontation. Later, Peter finds Lucy's letter from the abortion clinic and Peter assures Lucy he is behind her but does not support Lucy's decision to let Jane and Ian raise the baby and later learns that Lucy has miscarried. He begins sending anonymous gifts to Zsa Zsa but is caught out by Leon and his friend Arthur "Fatboy" Chubb (Ricky Norwood). Lucy plans to separate Leon and Zsa Zsa by exposing their affair and tells Zsa Zsa about the baby. Zsa Zsa is disgusted and during a confrontation, Leon announces that Lucy had an abortion. Peter is disgusted as he knows how much Jane wants a baby and is shocked further when he discovers Ian knew.

Peter is annoyed when his father assumes Lucy will get better GCSE grades than him. They both get good grades but Lucy's are exceptionally better. As the family celebrate, they are interrupted by Mr Allcock (Bill Buckhurst) who reveals that Lucy's results are inconsistent and there has been an allegation of cheating, meaning the exam board will have to look at Lucy and Peter's exam papers. However, Lucy admits cheating and gets Peter out of trouble. When Jane realises that Lucy may have had an abortion, Peter confirms this. Lucy decides to move to Devon to avoid spending another year studying, while Jane secretly plans to leave Ian. At Billie Jackson's (Devon Anderson) birthday party, Peter ends up kissing Whitney Dean (Shona McGarty). Whitney stays the night but later regrets it when Billie is found dead, believing that she could have saved him if she had stayed at home. Whitney later goes to Peter for comfort, and the couple start dating. Peter soon develops strong feelings for Whitney and plans to ask her to marry him. At Peter's birthday party, Ian insults Whitney, calling her "a walking STD", making Peter storm out and is devastated when Whitney dumps him. He gets drunk and vomits on Glenda Mitchell (Glynis Barber). Jane is supportive and understanding but Ian is resentful. Peter learns that Ian and Glenda are having an affair and he warns Glenda to keep her distance, making her think that he pushed her down the stairs in her flat. Upset with Ian, Peter throws a brick through his chip shop window. Glenda tells Ian that Peter admitted pushing her and Phil confronts Peter at a family gathering, Ian does not defend Peter, although no one knows that Ben is responsible. Later, Ian begs for forgiveness, and promises to tell Jane about the affair. Disgusted, he packs a bag and leaves a card for Jane saying "I'm sorry" before joining Lucy in Devon. Ian later receives news that Peter and Lucy have been involved in a car crash and takes Bobby (Alex Francis) to visit them. On her return, Lucy (now played by Hetti Bywater) reveals that she fell out with Peter as he dated her friend, Leanne, in Devon.

=== 2013–2015 ===
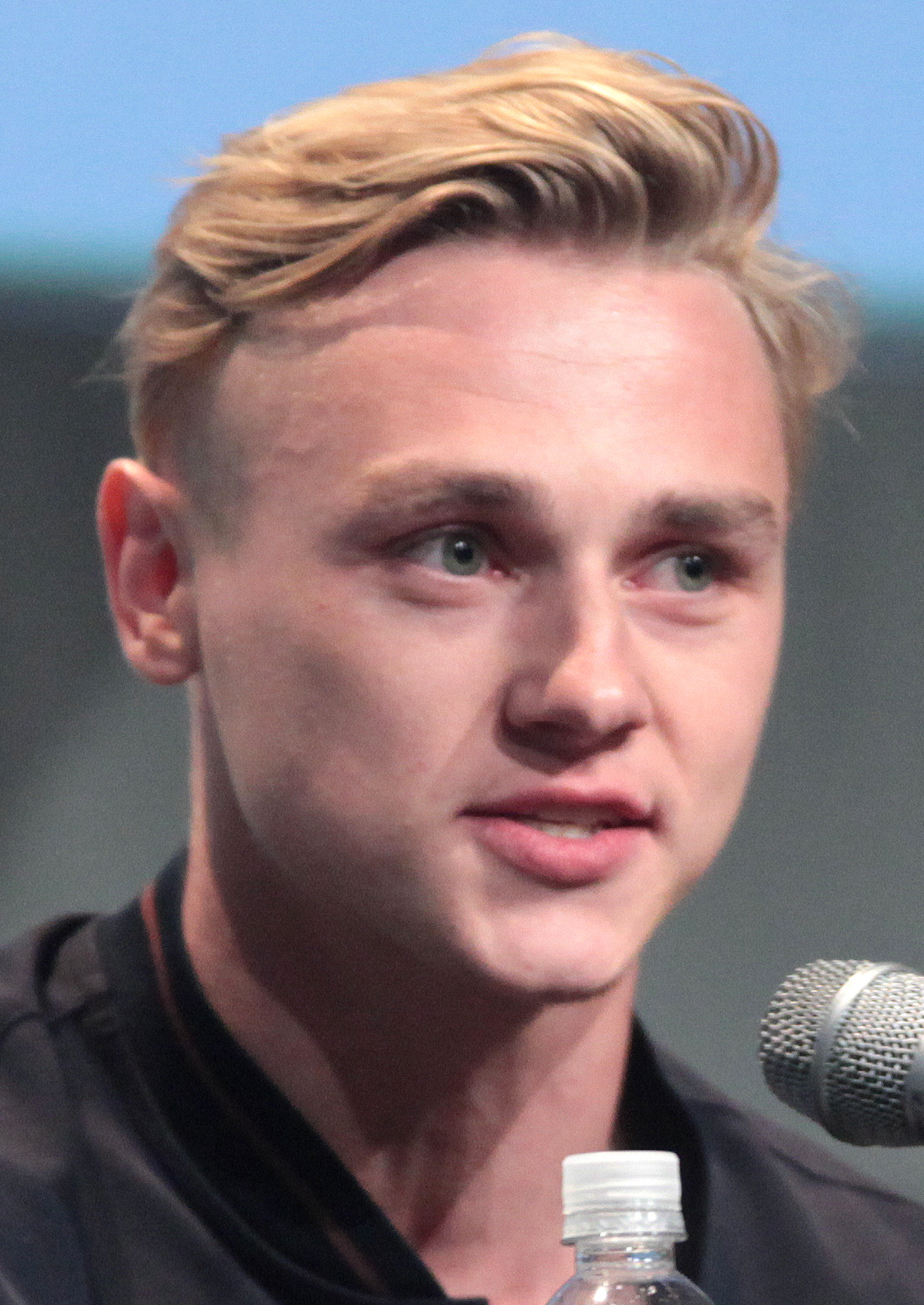
Ben Hardy's casting was announced in April 2013, with Peter returning two-months later.

Peter (now Ben Hardy) returns to Walford when Ian invites him to the opening of his new restaurant, Beale's. He learns that Lucy took control of Ian's businesses when Ian had a mental breakdown. Ian wants his businesses back and tricks Lucy into signing everything back to him; Peter confronts Ian but forgives him. Peter is shocked when his half-sister, Cindy (Mimi Keene) arrives and wants her to return to Devon because she aware of his secret, but she chooses to remain with the Beales. Peter later tells Lola Pearce (Danielle Harold) that his friend Gaz died while they were swimming because he pushed him to go further out to sea. Peter did not tell Gaz's family the details of what happened and this angers Lola, but they later start dating when she forgives him. Ian tells Peter that he is lying about witnessing Max Branning (Jake Wood) tampering with the car that injured Carl White (Daniel Coonan) and Phil, and Carl is blackmailing him to testify against Max and keep him locked up. For Lauren's sake, who is now a recovering alcoholic, Peter tries to get Ian to tell the truth and turns against Carl, resulting in a beating. Ian is stopped from testifying when he is kidnapped by Phil and Max, who have learned the truth. When Peter and Lola go public with their relationship, Phil and Ian reluctantly accept it and Peter moves in with Lola and her grandfather, Billy Mitchell (Perry Fenwick). In April 2014, Ian makes the discovery that Lucy has been taking cocaine and, in an attempt to reach out to her, tells her that she is his favourite, but Peter overhears and storms off, upset. The same night, Lucy is murdered (see Who Killed Lucy Beale?), devastating Peter and Ian, who begin searching for the truth.

Peter becomes reliant on Lauren for support as she was Lucy's best friend and business partner in a letting agency. A rift forms between him and Lola over his reliance on Lauren over her and they break up when Peter realises he is in love with Lauren and Lola is responsible for the publication of a well-meant article about Lucy that paints her as a rebellious teenager. Lauren rejects his advances as she has recently started dating Dean Wicks (Matt Di Angelo), but realises she is still in love with him when he rescues Kat Moon (Jessie Wallace) from a fire. Peter plans to leave Walford to live with Steven, but Lauren stops him and they declare their love for each other. Peter then leaves for a holiday with Steven in New Zealand. When he returns, he proposes to Lauren with Cindy's help (who has returned from Devon) and she accepts, but calls off the engagement almost immediately when Ian reveals that Peter was Lucy's cocaine dealer. Peter explains that he simply handled the drugs so Lucy would not come into contact with any dangerous drug dealers and she became addicted since they were staying in Devon several years ago with the addiction becoming stronger when Ian had his breakdown. Despite knowing this, Ian disowns Peter although Jane convinces him to let Peter move back in. In February 2015, Peter finds out that Lauren is pregnant with his child. When he offers to support her, she tells him that Lucy was murdered at home, leaving Peter thinking that either Ian or Jane killed Lucy. When the whole family learns that Bobby is the real killer, despite Jane trying to cover for him as she convinced him that he didn't, they try to tell him what he did. When Peter sees that the rest of the family do not want Bobby to know, he is furious. After realising that he cannot live with this secret, Peter announces he is moving to New Zealand to live with Steven and invites Lauren to join him. At first she rejects him but comes around soon after, and they both leave the Square together.

Seven months later, a heavily pregnant Lauren returns to Walford and gives birth to her and Peter's son, Louie Beale, named in honour of Peter's deceased great-grandmother, Lou Beale (Anna Wing). She and Louie later go back to New Zealand to be with Peter. In May 2016, Ian's mother Kathy Beale (Gillian Taylforth) contacts Lauren and informs her that Bobby (Eliot Carrington) has brutally attacked Jane, leaving her in a coma. Ian is shocked when Lauren and Louie then return to Walford, with Steven instead of Peter. Lauren reveals that her relationship with Peter ended due to Bobby's secret and she is now with Steven. Later that year, Steven steals equipment, supplies and money from Ian's restaurant. Jane and later Lauren find out about it and Steven admits that he did it to help Peter, who has been getting into debt, drinking heavily and getting into fights since his breakup with Lauren. In February 2018, after the trauma of enduring Abi's death, Lauren leaves Walford with Louie. Her grandmother Cora Cross (Ann Mitchell) later reveals that they have moved back to New Zealand, hinting that Lauren and Peter have reunited. A year later, Kathy tells Ian to tell Peter that Bobby has been released.

=== 2020–present ===
In February 2020, Lauren's uncle Jack Branning (Scott Maslen) reveals to Max that Lauren and Peter have split up and he has been aiding Lauren with money. That same month, Peter (now Dayle Hudson) returns to Walford after being contacted by his grandmother Kathy Beale (Gillian Taylforth) that Bobby (now Clay Milner Russell) has been left comatose after being attacked, as a result of islamophobia. Peter has undergone a personality change and struggles to adjust to life in Walford. He is hostile towards Ian and Bobby, having never forgiven them for their role in Lucy's death, but agrees to see them after a talk with Kathy. Peter flirts with former girlfriend Lola, much to the annoyance of Lola's boyfriend, Jay. Peter and Lola have sex, but she immediately regrets it and warns Peter that it was a mistake. Peter becomes close to Dotty Cotton (Milly Zero) and they almost kiss, but are interrupted by Bobby. Peter bonds with Ash Panesar (Gurlaine Kaur Garcha), and also attracts interest from Ash's mother, Suki Panesar (Balvinder Sopal) and they sleep together, unbeknownst to Ash. Despite this, Peter and Ash's friendship blossoms and they start dating when Ash's relationship with Iqra Ahmed (Priya Davdra) ends. Peter decides to impress Ash by jogging around the square in a cape, however, he falls and injures himself. Ash gives Peter medication, despite not being on duty and having consumed alcohol, leading to her being suspended. Their relationship is tested again when Ash's brother Jags (Amar Adatia) is killed in prison, and Peter fails to support Ash and ignores her. He later becomes jealous when he sees Ash with another man.

After Ian disappears, Peter is left in charge of his restaurant, Walford East. He becomes disliked and clashes with his cousin, Martin Fowler (James Bye) and Kat, when he organizes a racial discrimination campaign against her taxi firm when Ash believes that her employee Harvey Monroe (Ross Boatman), has made a racial remark towards her, which annoys Ash. Peter decides to sponsor a Christmas tree for Albert Square and enters into a brief feud with Mick Carter (Danny Dyer) and Janine Butcher (Charlie Brooks) when they successfully outbid him. Peter fails to warm to Kathy's boyfriend Tom "Rocky" Cotton (Brian Conley), who is impersonating as Sonia Fowler's (Natalie Cassidy) father, Terry Cant. Rocky is working with Dotty to fleece Peter and concocts a meat-free menu scheme for the restaurant, so Peter can buy his product and therefore take his money. Peter is reluctant and is furious when Kathy decides to invest in it. Peter becomes suspicious of Rocky when he continuously delays the arrival of the product. He later catches Rocky operating in a drug deal, but Rocky lies, although he is later exposed by Dotty for his lies and scheming. Peter has sex with Suki once again in January 2022, and this ends when Ash catches them together, and she subsequently ends their relationship. Peter is assaulted by his half uncle, Ben Mitchell (Max Bowden) and is left unconscious after Ben mistakes him for a homophobe. Peter is unaware of the identity of his attacker and is disgusted when Lewis Butler (Aidan O'Callaghan) reveals that it was Ben and that Kathy knew about it. During this time, he becomes close with Bobby's ex-girlfriend Dana Monroe (Barbara Smith), but Peter turns her down when she attempts to kiss him. They later have sex, unaware that Ben has seen them. Peter and Ben develop a feud when Peter discovers that Ben was responsible for his attack. After Ben reveals his fling with Dana, Peter decides to leave Walford and burns bridges with his family by publicly denouncing them. Kathy later learns that Peter has stolen her money, leaving her penniless. Although it is unknown exactly where Peter went to, Lauren reveals in December 2022 that Peter visited her and Louie in New Zealand, bringing lots of presents with him.

In June 2023, it is revealed that Peter is now living in France along with Ian and his mother Cindy, funding their lifestyle with the money he stole from Kathy. Cindy and Ian have reunited as a couple and it is revealed that Cindy did not die but was part of a witness protection scheme, which forced her to leave her family and assume a new identity. Lauren visits Peter and Louie and Peter confesses that he still loves Lauren. She reciprocates this at first, but when Ian has a heart attack, Peter, Lauren and Cindy all go to hospital. There, Lauren discovers that Cindy never died, and she confronts Peter and tells him that they will never get back together. Peter soon discovers that whilst Cindy was in witness protection, she married George Knight (Colin Salmon) and had two daughters Gina (Francesca Henry) and Anna Knight (Molly Rainford), and that they live at The Queen Victoria public house. Despite Ian's attempts to stop him, Peter decides to return to Walford to find them. Peter clashes with Ben again but the pair put the past behind them although Kathy is initially less forgiving. Peter and Bobby make amends and they go to the club on a night out, where Peter encounters a drunk Priya Nandra-Hart (Sophie Khan Levy) and takes her to bed; Peter is unable to perform and Priya cruelly humiliates him the next morning in the cafe in front of his family. Peter helps his parents open up a pie and mash restaurant and takes over the marketing, but residents soon discover that rapist, Dean is a silent partner, causing Peter to pull out. In November 2023, Rocky tampers with the electrics at the cafe in a bid to claim insurance money, starting a fire. Bobby is trapped in the flames and Peter goes in to rescue him, but is injured and left on a life support machine. Cindy blames Bobby and Kathy for Peter's condition and calls the police on Kathy when she reveals that she ignored problems with the electrics. Peter recovers and Harvey reveals that Rocky had caused the fire.

In January 2024, Lauren informs Peter over the phone that she is returning to Walford with Louie. Her cousin, Penny Branning (Kitty Castledine), follows them and plants drugs in Lauren's bag in an attempt to smuggle drugs into the country for her dealer, Juliette Dubois. A sniffer dog detects the drugs at the airport, leading to Lauren's arrest. Peter finds out and pressures Penny to confess to the police, which she does, resulting in Lauren's release. When Lauren sees Louie, she and Peter reminisce about the past. Peter asks her to stay longer, but Lauren declines, saying Walford reminds her too much of her deceased sister, Abi Branning (Lorna Fitzgerald). Lauren decides to leave Walford when she discovers Peter knew about Penny's actions. Bobby successfully convinces Lauren to make peace with Peter, emphasizing that her anger should be directed at Penny, not him. Peter becomes angry at Penny because she announces that she, Lauren, and Louie are moving in together and Peter doesn't want his son in the same house as a drug dealer, however Peter and Penny later get drunk and clear the air. Lauren and Peter realise they still have feelings for each other. Ian encourages Peter to win Lauren back, while Cindy advises Lauren to rekindle their relationship only if she is sure they won't break up again, for Louie's sake. Uncertain, Lauren rejects Peter's attempts at romance and sleeps with Zack Hudson (James Farrar). Despite this, they eventually resume their relationship.

When Lauren is injured in the crush at Peggy's Nightclub in August 2024, she develops an addiction to prescription painkillers, but soon discovers she is pregnant; Peter is overjoyed, unaware of Lauren's addiction. Cindy starts giving Lauren drugs in exchange for her silence over Cindy's relation to an accident which injured George's brother Kojo Asare (Dayo Koleosho); when Lauren starts a fire while intoxicated, Peter refuses to believe Lauren when she states Cindy was supplying the drugs. When Lauren exposes Cindy's affair with Anna and Gina's half-brother Junior Knight (Micah Balfour), Peter disowns Cindy and is angry with Lauren, demanding she stays away from him and Louie. Peter soon becomes suspected of attempted murder when Cindy is viciously attacked by an unknown assailant shortly afterwards. Peter proposes to Lauren but she turns him down as she worries that she may have been the one who attacked Cindy as she was addicted to painkillers during this time, but Kathy confesses to Lauren that she is the attacker after she sees how the whole incident is affecting their relationship. When Lauren tells Peter, he confronts Kathy and is hurt to know that Ian also had knowledge of this. Peter then tells both Ian and Kathy that he may be unable to forgive them. Peter and Lauren eventually get engaged when Lauren proposes to him. Shortly after, Lauren goes into labour and is supported by Cindy. Lauren then gives birth to a boy and both her and Peter name him Jimmy, after Lauren's late grandfather Jim Branning (John Bardon). Although Peter thanks Cindy for helping Lauren, he and the Beale family disowns her.

== Reception ==
In May 2009, Executive producer Diederick Santer praised the younger cast of EastEnders, including Law. Stuart Heritage from The Guardian expressed a dislike for Peter in April 2010, saying he should be written out, "before his increasingly spectacular haircut goes power mad and starts to colonise the entire set. Also, his voice has been breaking for what seems like seven full years, so he could probably use his new-found free time to consult a doctor or something." In 2014, Matt Bramford from What to Watch put Peter's recasting on his list of the 18 best recastings in British and Australian soap operas, commenting, "We've lost count of the amount of actors that have played Ian's son".
