= Harvey Monroe =

Fictional character from EastEnders

- EastEnders character
- Portrayed by: Ross Boatman
- Duration: 2021–present
- First appearance: Episode 6311; 22 July 2021
- Introduced by: Jon Sen
In-universe information
- Occupation: Taxi driver
- Sisters: Fern Monroe
- Sons: Aaron Monroe
- Daughters: Dana Monroe

Harvey Monroe is a fictional character from the BBC soap opera EastEnders, played by Ross Boatman. He was introduced in episode 6311, broadcast on 22 July 2021, as the father of established character Dana Monroe (Barbara Smith). Boatman was excited to earn the part of Harvey as he was an avid fan of the show and worked extensively on his audition video. Despite initially being penned as an affable and good-hearted cab driver who loves his family, Harvey was created to cause obstacles between Dana and her boyfriend Bobby Beale (Clay Milner Russell). His storylines included his relationship with Dana and his son Aaron Monroe (Charlie Wernham), his friendships with Tom "Rocky" Cotton (Brian Conley), Mitch Baker (Roger Griffiths) and Ross Marshall (Alex Walkinshaw), and his relationships with Jean Slater (Gillian Wright) and Kathy Beale (Gillian Taylforth).

== Creation and casting ==
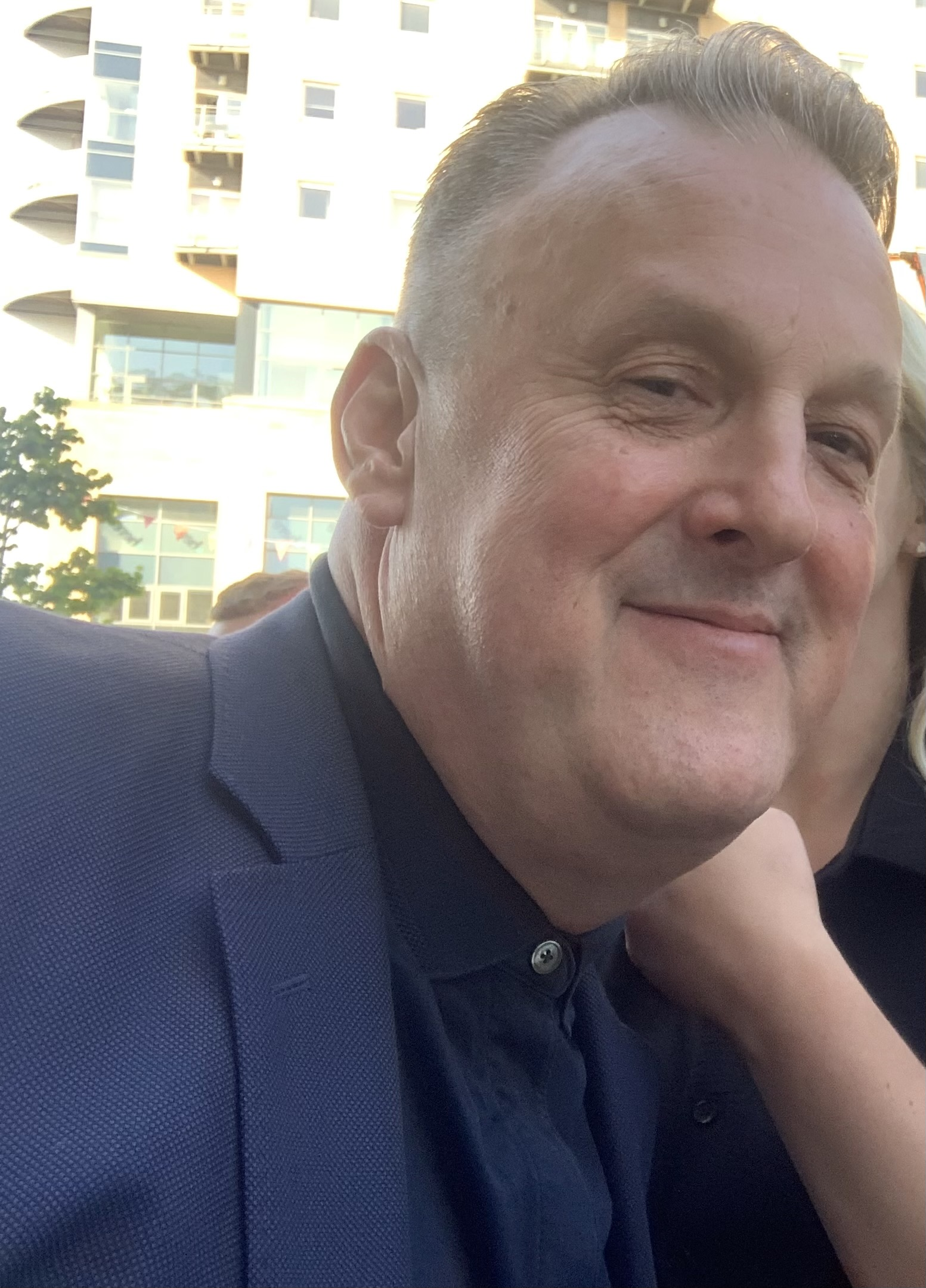
Ross Boatman (pictured) plays Harvey, the single father of Dana Monroe (Barbara Smith).

Boatman's casting was announced on 9 June 2021, with Harvey being teased as the father of established character Dana Monroe (Barbara Smith). Boatman had wanted to join EastEnders for a long time, so when he learned about the role of Harvey, he became determined to win the part as he felt it was perfect for him. Owing to social distancing restrictions, he had to record his audition, which he spent two days doing, having rehearsed "about 20 times" for each scene. He was set to arrive in Summer 2021. Harvey's character was created as an obstacle in a storyline about a relationship between Dana and Bobby Beale (Clay Milner Russell). In the announcement, the BBC billed Harvey as "a real family man who's proud to have been raised in Bow and even prouder to be a dad". Harvey was further described as being "traditional" and having "a good heart". As Harvey raised Dana alone as a single father, he was said to be "fiercely protective" over her and that he "will do anything" to ensure her safety. Boatman described Harvey's relationship with Dana as "close", explaining: "He's a single dad and very protective over her. He's a kind, loving father – he's not perfect, a little overprotective maybe, but he's a good guy, an old school East Ender with traditional values," he said. "He's a salt of the earth guy, wants to do the best by his family. "There will be more to Harvey than just being a dad of course. Fingers crossed together with a fantastic team of writers I'll help shape a character that the EastEnders audience will enjoy".

Boatman was excited to join the soap, commenting: "Some actors long for all the glamour of the Hollywood hills. Others dream about the bright lights of London's West End. All I ever wanted was jellied eels, Albert Square and cheeky pint at The Queen Vic. Words can hardly express how happy and excited I am to be here at last. I absolutely love the show and can't wait to get started. I feel truly blessed". Despite his excitement, Boatman admitted to being nervous about his first day on-set, despite his lengthy career. Executive producer Jon Sen was impressed with Boatman's casting, saying "he's perfect to play the affable father to Dana who's over the moon his daughter's found a match in Bobby but secrets aren't likely to stay hidden on the Square so Bobby's attempts at re-invention may well be futile". He added that the team were "looking forward" to Harvey's arrival and how he would "shake up" the Beale family unit.

== Development ==
=== Introduction and relationship meddling ===
In July 2021, Boatman teased the nature of his character's arrival. Boatman teased Harvey would arrive at Bobby's 18th birthday party, as, in Boatman's words: "Harvey first shows up at the restaurant for Bobby's surprise party and he ends up surprising everybody! It's a shock for Bobby and Dana too, she's not expecting her dad". Harvey made his first appearance in episode 6311, broadcast on 22 July 2021. Boatman hinted that Harvey would become a regular as he would find employment, saying: "He is a cabbie by trade and as luck would have it there's a new cab office on the square, so maybe if Harvey's very lucky he might find himself a bit of work in Walford too". When Harvey became a regular on the soap, having found a home and a job as a taxi driver at the local taxi firm, Boatman was excited about his character's progression, commenting: "it feels solid. I can't tell you how exciting it is - I feel fantastic". The actor explained that Harvey was pleased to be closer to Dana and envisioned it was "a new beginning" for the two characters. Boatman's experience as a father helped him to develop his character and he thought it was realistic for Harvey to be "interfering" and how "even if you know they've grown up and are making their own life, it's very hard to stand back and let them go without chucking your two pence in and telling them how you feel".

As Bobby had been lying to Dana about being a successful businessman, Harvey would initially be happy that Dana found a man, with no confirmation on his reaction when he found out the truth about Bobby. Harvey is initially delighted with Dana's new relationship, but does not realise that Dana is not telling the truth about Bobby. Boatman noted that his character thought of Bobby as "a keeper" at first. Prior to Harvey's arrival, Bobby told Dana that he murderered his sister, Lucy (Hetti Bywater), years prior. Boatman reckoned that Harvey wouldn't be a fan of Bobby's history when he would inevitably learn it, saying "I think like any caring parent he'd be extremely alarmed and deeply concerned", adding that if his own daughter dated someone who had murdered their sibling, he wouldn't be "all too happy about it" and that Harvey would be even willing to accept it. During the moving process, Harvey learns that Bobby killed his sister as a child, which Boatman explained made Harvey feel "alarmed" and "worried" about Dana's safety and related to the situation as he has a daughter of a similar age to Dana. Boatman enjoyed working with Smith and Milner Russell. After being told by Tom "Rocky" Cotton (Brian Conley) about Bobby's past, Boatman teased that Harvey would be "pretty unhappy about it to say the least". He explained that he doubted Harvey had anything personal against Bobby, and that the ensuing outburst was a "natural reaction" as "he thinks Dana can do better than going out with a convicted killer".

Being on the show was everything Boatman expected it to be. He described it as "dreamlike" to walk on the set for the first time. In August 2021, the show announced that Harvey's son Aaron Monroe (Charlie Wernham) would join the soap, thus developing the Monroe's a family. Despite Harvey's relationship with Aaron being described as "close", Aaron and Dana's dislike of each other meant Harvey's relationship with them both would likely be "tested".

=== Relationship with Jean Slater ===
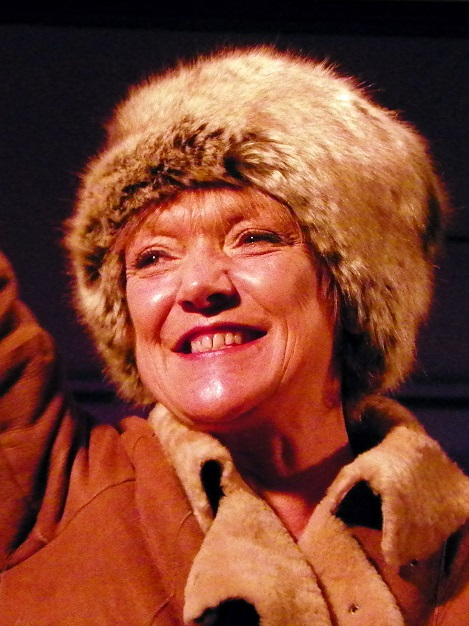
Gillian Wright (pictured) plays Jean.

In November 2021, the show announced that a relationship between Harvey and his friend Jean Slater (Gillian Wright) would begin. Despite their flirting, a relationship did not start as Harvey was distracted owing to Aaron having joined a right-wing hate group. They shared their first kiss in February 2022. In an interview with Zoe Ball, Boatman commented that he enjoyed working with Wright, and admitted that things were "going swimmingly" for Harvey at that moment, but noted that love never runs smoothly in EastEnders, warning viewers to expect "bumps in the road".

After only a few months, Jean and Harvey became engaged. A source from the show told Metro that "Jean will face some dramatic moments as her relationship with Harvey Monroe gathers momentum". As Jean's mental health began deteriorating, Boatman revealed that Harvey and Jean's relationship would not end happily as Jean went into a manic episode on their wedding day. The actor explained: "When he first met Jean, she wasn't in the depths of her bipolar disorder, so Harvey just sees an amazing, kind, funny woman who is paying him all this attention". Boatman also commented that Harvey would struggle to accept Jean's mental illness, explaining "He hasn't been in a relationship since the one with his wife and here's this wonderful woman who’s paying him all this attention. I don't know if delusional is the right word, but he doesn't want to believe [there's a problem]". Boatman teased that Harvey and Jean's future would be "heartbreaking" as Harvey would begin doubting if they loved each other or if the relationship was a result of Jean's bipolar. He explained: "It's a crushing blow on him, as on the one hand he feels he might have lost the woman he loves, and on the other hand, did she ever really love him at all". Continuing, He stated: "So he has this double crushing blow of their relationship falling apart but also did she ever really love him at all? It's a double whammy for him". The actor commented that he would "absolutely love to see them overcome Jean's illness together" and believed Harvey would still care about Jean no matter what. After a breakup, Boatman said he would be happy to see a reunion between the two characters as he and Wright enjoyed working together, with Jean and Harvey remaining friends.

=== Maya Houssain ===
On 20 May 2024, the show announced that a new character, Maya Houssain (Bharti Patel), would be introduced for a storyline focused on Harvey. Patel's time on the show was written as being a guest stint and her reason for introduction was to form an "unlikely friendship" with Harvey as Rocky, Mitch, and his children had all departed, leaving him with only Jean.

== Storylines ==
Harvey arrives in Walford after his daughter, Dana Monroe (Barbara Smith), begins dating Bobby Beale (Clay Milner Russell). Initially welcoming and friendly towards Bobby, his attitude quickly changes upon learning Bobby lied on his dating profile and was responsible for the murder of his half-sister, Lucy Beale (Hetti Bywater) (see 'Who Killed Lucy Beale?'). A single father, he works as a cab driver finding employment with Kat Slater (Jessie Wallace) at her taxi firm, Kat's Cabs. Ash Panesar (Gurlaine Kaur Garcha) accuses Harvey of racism after a comment about her generation is interpreted as a microaggression regarding her culture and faith, the same faith Bobby is a part of, while driving her back to the Square. The misunderstanding causes Harvey unpopularity amongst the residents, including Bobby's grandmother Kathy Beale (Gillian Taylforth) and half-brother Peter Beale (Dayle Hudson), who previously dated Ash. Dana too sides with Bobby and Ash and encourages her father to apologise. Upon the arrival of his son, Aaron (Charlie Wernham), Harvey explains the misunderstanding and Aaron, siding with his father, publicly calls out Ash in the Queen Vic and demands she apologise for the accusations. Aaron, a member of the far-right who holds Islamophobic views, expresses disdain at the idea of Dana converting to the Islamic faith as her relationship with Bobby continues to grow. Neil Hughes (Thomas Coombes), an associate of Aaron's and a member of a far-right terrorist group, plans an arson attack on The Argee Bhajee after Aaron informs him of plans to turn it into a mosque. This, coupled with their recent attack on Keegan Baker (Zack Morris), causes Harvey to see sense. Ostracising and reprimanding Aaron for his actions and racism, Harvey has him arrested.

After this, Harvey soon settles into life in Walford, continuing to work as a cab driver and forming friendships with Keegan's father Mitch Baker (Roger Griffiths) and Tom "Rocky" Cotton (Brian Conley) after Dana leaves to study in Glasgow. In 2022, a bond soon develops between him and Jean Slater (Gillian Wright) and they begin a relationship. However, the relationship is tested as Harvey struggles to keep up with Jean's wild lifestyle choices while she is suffering a long-term bipolar episode. Harvey attempts to support Jean, agreeing to marry her, but breaks off the relationship after discovering she tried to kiss Rocky. Jean's behaviour continues to spiral, and only the intervention of her daughter Stacey Slater (Lacey Turner) prevents Jean from drowning herself. She is subsequently sectioned and upon her release, and improving mental health, him and Jean resume their relationship and Harvey moves into the Slater household. Harvey soon discovers Rocky was responsible for the fire in Kathy's Café as part of an insurance fraud to earn money to pay off his debts to Nish Panesar (Navin Chowdhry), Harvey threatens Rocky to tell Kathy the truth or he himself will. Rocky does and is subsequently sentenced to 10 years in prison. Harvey clashes with Dean Wicks (Matt Di Angelo) and Jean believes that Dean is tampering with his daughter Jade Masood's (Elizabeth Green) medication to prevent Jade from leaving for Pakistan to live with her mother, after he is ostracised owing to previously raping Linda Carter (Kellie Bright). Dean tries to manipulate Jean into believing that her bipolar has made her tamper with Jade's medication, until Harvey discovers the truth and informs Stacey.

With Rocky in prison and Mitch departing Walford the previous Christmas, Harvey begins to suffer from loneliness. He finds a new friend in Maya Houssain (Bharti Patel), bonding over their shared passion of football. Jean soon becomes jealous of their friendship but Harvey assures her they are just friends. When Maya reveals she is facing financial struggles, behind Jean's back, Harvey lends Maya money to help support herself. Harvey, however, is left confused when Maya's social media accounts disappear. He manages to track Maya down to her home where he meets her husband, Abdul, a fellow taxi driver who his son Aaron beat up in a racist attack two years prior. Feeling guilty, Harvey continues to lend Maya money, but an incident where he falls asleep at the wheel with Jean's great granddaughter Charli Slater inside the car, causes Jean to demand Maya to stop asking for money. Jean kicks him out of the Slater house, and following her trip to Greece, won on a radio quiz by Harvey and Kathy, she eventually allows him to move back in. He and Kathy, however, continue to grow closer, sharing a kiss together that they both dismiss as a mistake, agreeing not to tell Jean. Harvey provides a false alibi for Kathy after she is labelled a suspect when Cindy Beale (Michelle Collins) is attacked on Christmas Day 2024, and Martin Fowler (James Bye) discovers this but agrees to hide this from Jean.

In February 2025, Harvey and Jean attend the wedding of Billy (Perry Fenwick) and Honey Mitchell (Emma Barton) where an explosion outside the Vic results in Martin dying in the rubble. Harvey and the Slaters are consumed with grief but Jean is dismissive of Harvey's feelings towards losing his friend and focuses more on Stacey and Lily Slater (Lillia Turner). Seeing Lily is struggling and wanting to help, Harvey has Martin's Spurs shirt made into a baby blanket for her daughter, Charli, unaware Stacey planned to have Martin buried wearing it. Stacey finds out and is furious, with Jean arranging for her to visit her brother Sean (Robert Kazinsky) to grieve properly. Harvey asks Jean if Stacey is leaving because of what he did but she snaps at him, accusing Harvey of making Martin's death all about himself. During this time, he grows closer to Kathy again and they bond during their shared grief. Harvey's attempt to help around the house result in pushback from Jean who continues to be snappy with him during Stacey's absence. Feeling neglected and noticing Kathy is increasingly upset over Martin's death, he arranges a picnic for her at the allotments where Kathy attempts to kiss him. Harvey backs off but the next day he goes to Kathy's house, admitting he has feelings for her, and they sleep together, later embarking on an affair.

Jean eventually starts noticing Harvey become distant as his affair with Kathy continues. Kathy, however, begins to feel guilty after Jean opens up to her that she's worried Harvey's lost interest, feeling guilty herself for how she responded when Harvey was grieving over Martin. Kathy demands Harvey breakup with Jean if their relationship is to continue but Harvey, recognising how fragile the Slaters are, can't bring himself to do it. He eventually manages to encourage and convince the family to support each other. Jean, grateful for what Harvey did, proposes to him in the garden. Harvey, however, doesn't respond and an embarrassed Jean runs away to the cafe, having another heart to heart with Kathy about how she thinks she's difficult to love. Harvey meanwhile is torn but after speaking to Alfie Moon (Shane Richie) reluctantly agrees to marry Jean. Later that night he meets up in secret with Kathy again, unaware Cindy has seen them and is recording them both together. She reveals the recording in the Vic during a party for Peter and Lauren Branning's (Jacqueline Jossa) new born son, Jimmy Beale. Jean is devastated but following a heart to heart she attempts to forgive, telling him how important he is to the family. Harvey, however, doesn't want to stay with Jean purely because he's needed and breaks up with her, telling Jean he doesn't love her, and moves in with Kathy with the two soon settling into a steady relationship despite consistent comments from a hurt Jean. Later in the year, due to his own history with Aaron, he shows sympathy for Ross Marshall (Alex Walkinshaw), who feels guilty after his misogynistic son, Joel (Max Murray), attacks his partner, Vicki Fowler (Alice Haig) and labels Kathy's son Ian Beale (Adam Woodyatt) a hypocrite due to Bobby's history too, leading the pair to offer Ross a place to stay after Vicki's half-sister, Sharon Watts (Letitia Dean), kicks him out. Harvey becomes friends with Ross and serving as his best man when he and Vicki decide to marry. In September 2026, Harvey repairs his relationship with Jean and the two agree to be civil after she thanks Harvey for supporting Lily when her relative, Zoe Slater (Michelle Ryan), dies suddenly in her sleep, helping her look for an apprenticeship. He angers Ian upon his release from prison and the former, still effected from his violent confrontation with cellmate Gray Atkins (Toby-Alexander Smith), punches Harvey after he misses a health inspection while working at Ian's Chip Shop.

== Reception ==
For his portrayal of Harvey, Boatman won the British Soap Award for Best Newcomer award at the 2022 British Soap Awards.
