= Dayle Hudson =

British actor

- Education: Italia Conti Academy of Theatre Arts
- Occupation: Actor
- Years active: 2017–present
- Television: EastEnders
- Height: 6 ft 3 in (191 cm)

Dayle Hudson is a British actor. He initially did an apprenticeship before attending Italia Conti Academy of Theatre Arts. After graduating, Hudson worked as a bricklayer and would audition. In 2019, Hudson was cast in the regular role of Peter Beale on the British soap opera EastEnders, becoming the seventh actor in the role. Hudson's debut aired in February 2020, and he remained in the role until he was written out in 2022. Hudson has also performed in various theatre productions and in the 2017 short film Sleight.

== Life and career ==
Dayle Hudson comes from a family of bricklayers and would help his father on building sites. Hudson completed his apprenticeship before attending Italia Conti Academy of Theatre Arts. He also took part in several theatre productions. After graduating from the drama school in 2017, Hudson went back to working as a bricklayer and would audition during the week. In 2017, Hudson appeared in the short film Sleight.

In December 2019, it was announced that Hudson would take over the role of Peter Beale on the British soap opera EastEnders, becoming the seventh actor in the role. The character had last been portrayed by Ben Hardy from 2013 to 2015. Hudson said that he was grateful and excited to be able to "work on such an institution of British television, alongside some incredible actors". The actor added that he was "very excited" to see what the future held for Peter. EastEnders executive producer Jon Sen said of his casting, "As soon as I met Dayle, I knew he'd be the one to bring Peter Beale back to Walford. Peter's a young man with a big heart but a bruised soul and Dayle's a talented actor who captures his complexity perfectly. I welcome him to the company and can't wait to start working with him".

""I was doing a building job in Lewisham and I kept having to book days off to go to the 'dentist'. So I went to the audition and then my agent called a few days later when I was building a wall at work and told me they wanted me on EastEnders. I couldn't believe my luck – especially as it was coming to the end of winter and it was really cold and wet."

— Hudson on how he got his EastEnders role (2020).

When Hudson auditioned for EastEnders, he was told that the role was for a character called Tommy and that would only last a few months. Hudson screamed of shock when he found out that the role was for Peter and felt "on top of the world", especially as he found out shortly before his birthday. Hudson used to watch EastEnders before he went to acting school, and his parents were happy that he was cast on the soap as they had watched it since he was young. Hudson was "intimidated" to be joining the Beale family but felt welcomed by his onscreen family members and felt that he had gotten closer to the cast and could ask them for help. To research the role, Hudson watched old clips of Peter and had a lot of communications with producers. Being the seventh actor in the role, he felt he had to put his "own spin" on the character; he also felt lucky that Peter had been offscreen for five years as it meant that the character had changed, giving him a "blank canvas to work with". Hudson also spoke to Thomas Law, who had previously portrayed Peter between 2006 and 2010, as his mother still worked on EastEnders. Hudson told Digital Spy, "We got on like a house on fire. Tom then got in contact and was like, 'My mum absolutely loves you!' and we started speaking. It was lovely. I asked Tom for a bit of advice and he has been sound. He's been in the industry a lot longer than I have so he's been on hand every time I needed to ask him something."

Hudson's debut as Peter aired on 18 February 2020, during the soap's 35th anniversary celebrations week. Following Hudson's debut as Peter, several viewers commented on how they thought he was good looking. Viewers and critics also commented on Hudson's height in comparison to Peter's previous portrayers, which prompted Hudson to reveal on social media that he is 6 ft 3 in, as he felt that he looked taller onscreen as he was wearing "massive" boots and jacket. Hudson felt that the reaction towards Peter had been "huge" and acknowledged that he would be recognised by viewers whilst in public. During his time on 'EastEnders, filming was temporarily suspended in 2020 due to the COVID-19 pandemic in London; Hudson later posted and deleted a picture of the scripts of the soap's return to filming, which revealed that episodes would return to broadcast in September 2020. Hudson said that his EastEnders experience taught him a lot professionally.

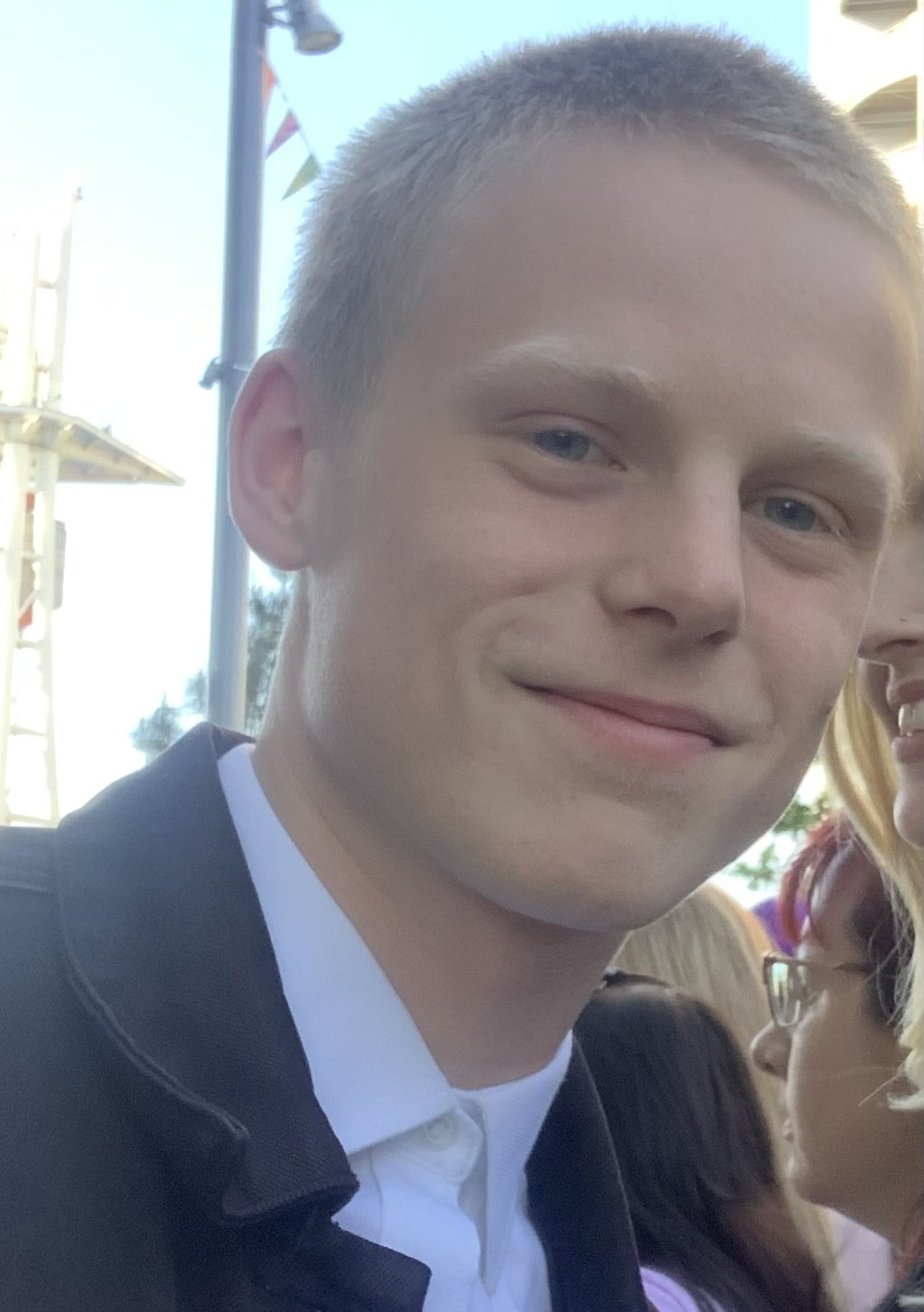
Hudson lived close to his colleague Clay Milner Russell (pictured).

During Hudson's stint on the soap, Peter's storylines included his rocky relationship with various family members, including his father Ian Beale (Adam Woodyatt) and his half-brother Bobby Beale (Clay Milner Russell), taking over Ian's businesses, having sexual relations with Lola Pearce (Danielle Harold), Ash Panesar (Gurlaine Kaur Garcha), her mother Suki Panesar (Balvinder Sopal) and Bobby's girlfriend Dana Monroe (Barbara Smith), and getting attacked by his half uncle Ben Mitchell (Max Bowden) in a case of mistaken identity. In 2021, Hudson told Inside Soap that his girlfriend would help him with the storylines, especially in regards to race and women. Hudson had previously told Digital Spy that he wanted Peter's former stepmother Jane Beale (Laurie Brett) and his ex-girlfriend Lauren Branning (Jacqueline Jossa) to return to the soap in order to explore Peter's relationships. Hudson felt nervous filming Peter and Suki's affair scene but found it exciting. The role also required Hudson to perform a partially nude scene for the first time in his career. Clay and Hudson lived close to each other and thus would run scenes together. Hudson expressed admiration for his colleagues Gillian Taylforth (Kathy Beale) and Danny Dyer (Mick Carter). Hudson also commented that Peter's attitude towards women is different to his, as Peter does not want commitment.

In June 2022, it was announced that Hudson and three other EastEnders cast members had been written out of the soap by new executive producer Chris Clenshaw . The four cast members filmed their final scenes that summer. An EastEnders insider explained that it was "nothing personal" to the cast members, adding, "it's simply a creative decision – for big storylines to happen you have to say goodbye to people, that's the nature of soap". Hudson's last episode aired on 14 July of that year. Following his exit, Hudson thanked his co-stars and EastEnders, calling his experience "one hell of a ride" and a "socially distanced dream", which received comments of support from other EastEnders actors. The following year, the role was recast again to Law.

In July 2022, it was announced that Hudson had joined the cast of the pantomime version of Jack and the Beanstalk as the villainous Nightshade. Rehearsals for the play began in November 2022 and the performance ran from 10 December 2022 to 7 January 2023 at the Norwich Theatre.

== Personal life ==
Hudson has two older brothers. In 2021, Hudson revealed on his Instagram account that he was in a relationship with a model and dancer called India, with it being reported that they had begun dating in the summer of 2020. Hudson joked that she did not want to hear about Peter's romances in EastEnders. In 2023, it was reported that the pair had broken up.

== Acting credits ==
=== Filmography ===
| Year | Title | Role | Notes | Ref. |
|---|---|---|---|---|
| 2017 | Sleight | Him | Short film | |
| 2020–22 | EastEnders | Peter Beale | Regular role | |

=== Stage ===
| Year | Production | Role | Venue | Ref. |
|---|---|---|---|---|
| 2022–23 | Jack and the Beanstalk | Nightshade | Norwich Theatre | |
