= Dana Monroe =

Fictional character from EastEnders

- EastEnders character
- Portrayed by: Barbara Smith
- Duration: 2021–2022
- First appearance: Episode 6247; 1 April 2021
- Last appearance: Episode 6549; 1 September 2022
- Introduced by: Jon Sen
In-universe information
- Other names: Dana Adams
- Occupation: Waitress
- Father: Harvey Monroe
- Brothers: Aaron Monroe

Dana Monroe (initially credited as Dana Adams) is a fictional character from the BBC soap opera EastEnders, played by Barbara Smith. Smith auditioned for the role over Zoom due to the impact of the COVID-19 pandemic on television and was cast as Dana, a love interest for established character Bobby Beale (Clay Milner Russell), making her first appearance on 1 April 2021. She was initially cast in a 6-month guest stint, but was promoted to a regular cast member and had her family introduced to the soap. She was overjoyed to have been cast due to having been a fan of the soap since her youth. Dana has been shown to be a bubbly, generous and likeable character. Smith was initially unsure if viewers would like her, but critics have said that it has been refreshing to have a character with good intentions on EastEnders. It was announced on 10 June 2022 that Smith had been axed by new executive producer Chris Clenshaw, with Dana set to exit the show later in the year. Smith admitted that it was fitting for Dana to leave as she was of university age and was excited for her final scenes to air. She also confirmed that if she was asked, she would return to the soap in the future. Dana's final scenes aired on 1 September 2022.

As well as her on-off relationship with Bobby, her tumultuous relationships with her relatives have been central to Dana's storylines. Her father Harvey Monroe (Ross Boatman) is shown to be a strict father to Dana and attempts to control her, while her brother Aaron Monroe (Charlie Wernham) disgusts Dana with his racist and Islamophobic attitudes. Smith noted that despite Dana being at the bottom of the Monroe family's power hierarchy, it would not stop her from attempting to change their family's old-fashioned mindsets. Her relationship with Bobby has been well received by viewers and critics, with one of their scenes nominated for Feel Good Moment at the 2021 Inside Soap Awards. Smith was also nominated in the newcomer categories at the 2021 I Talk Telly Awards and the Digital Spy Reader Awards for her portrayal of Dana.

== Casting and characterisation ==
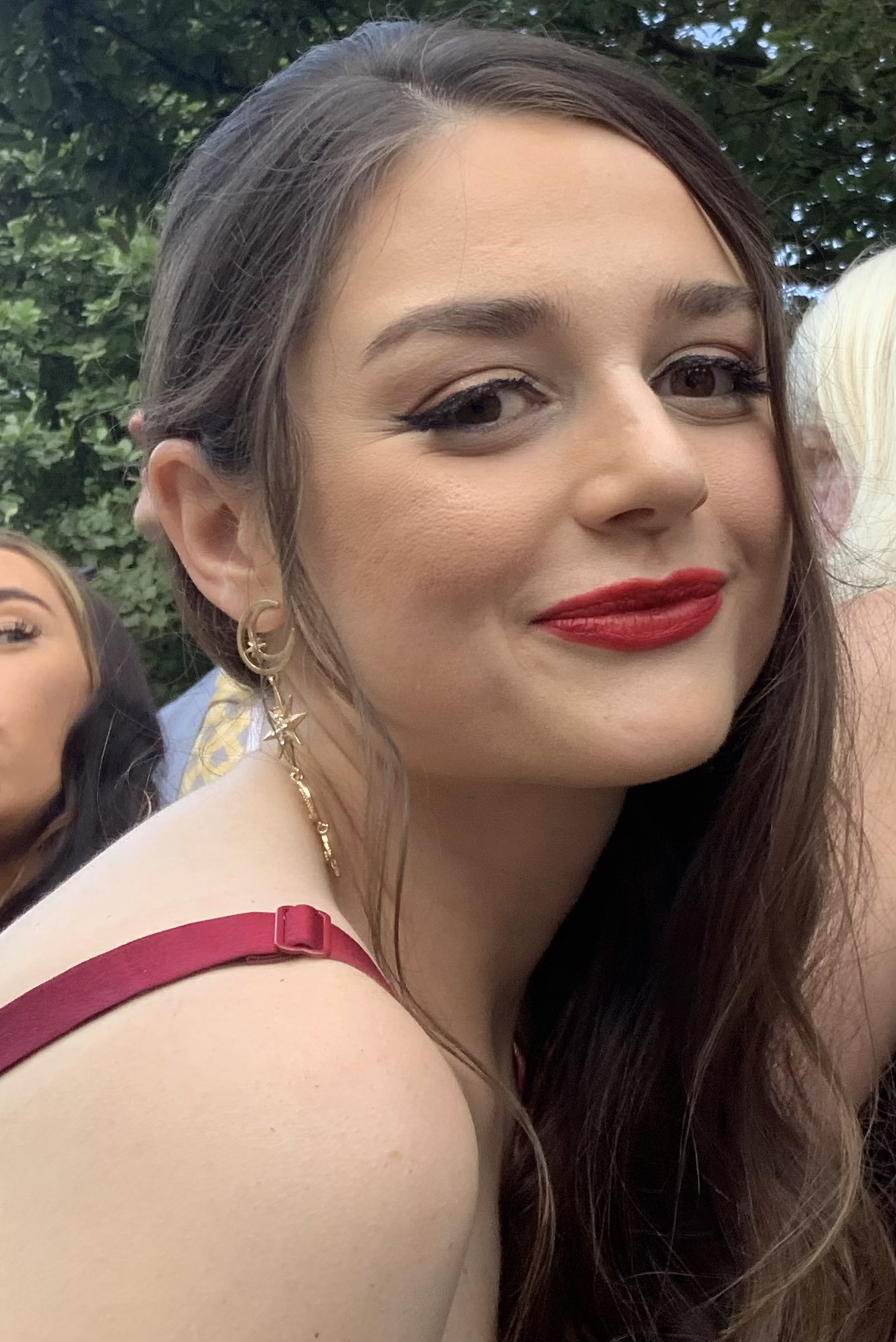
Barbara Smith (pictured) plays Dana.

Smith's casting was announced on 28 March 2021, when it was confirmed that she would be guest starring as a love interest for established character Bobby Beale (Clay Milner Russell). Smith said that she was attracted to playing Dana since she is a smiley and bubbly character, describing her as the "innocent wholesome version of the girl next door". She was also keen to be involved in a romantic storyline since she had not previously been part of one. Smith auditioned for the role of Dana over Zoom with executive producer Jon Sen and other members of the production team. Smith was unsure about her performance and felt that she could have changed things about her audition, so went for a walk with her mother afterwards to ease her thoughts. Hours later, her agent informed her that she had gotten the role and that she would begin filming imminently. She was initially contracted for six months. Smith noted her happiness at having been cast due to having been a long-term viewer of the soap; she described the moment she was told as "a moment [she will] remember for a long time".

Smith had appeared in EastEnders prior to portraying Dana, when she played Ellie in 2019, a school student who gives Bex Fowler (Jasmine Armfield) drugs. However, the role was filmed on-location, and Smith had therefore not been on the set of EastEnders until 2021. When she arrived on set, Smith felt as though she was stepping into her television and said it was a moment where she had to pinch herself. She noted her "obsession" with the soap as a child and particularly noted her adoration for cast member Lacey Turner. Smith said that she is fairly similar to her character, specifically due to sharing a love for books and films. Dana is into anime, which Smith does not watch, but she felt that she is similar to her with how she likes to escape into fictional worlds. She said that Dana is the nicest character she has played throughout her career, adding that Walford needs more nice characters like her own. When asked what Smith liked the most about Dana, she said that it was her generosity and her willingness to do anything for her loved ones. She opined that in real life, she is more selfish than Dana, but liked being able to play such a likeable character. She felt that Dana was "quite an unusual character for soapland" since she only has good intentions and was unsure what the viewers' reception would be. Dana gets a job as a waitress, which Smith liked since she felt it made Dana more "rooted in reality" due to many 19-year-olds having waitressing jobs. She had worked as a waitress in real life prior to portraying Dana and said that the restaurant scenes reminded her of her times as a waitress.

== Development ==
=== Introduction ===
Kim Fox (Tameka Empson) makes it her mission to find love for Bobby and introduces him to Dana, setting the pair up on a date that aired on 1 April 2021. However, as Suki Panesar (Balvinder Sopal) destroys his confidence prior to the date, the Metro's Stephen Patterson wrote that this could affect Dana's date. Bobby introduces himself as 'Rob' on the date and tells Dana that he is the owner of Walford East, his family's restaurant, as well as owning his own house. However, Bobby's "lies threaten to catch up with him" when Dana unexpectedly arrives at Walford East. After continuing to lie about his identity, Bobby eventually becomes worried about their relationship when Dana announces that she wants to get more serious within their relationship. Smith was initially nervous to film romantic scenes with Russell, particularly when COVID-19 restrictions meant that they could not touch. This meant that Smith had to get it across that her character was interested in Bobby without touching him, which she found challenging. She was also nervous when they were able to kiss, but since Russell was nervous too, they formed a "we're in this together" mindset to allow them to do it. Viewers have given the pairing the portmanteau 'Bana'.

=== Establishment of the Monroe family ===
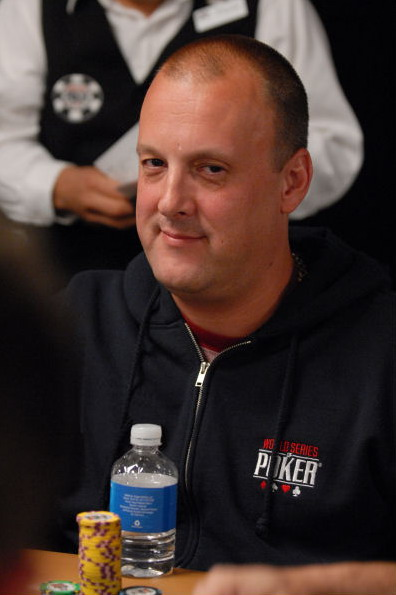
Ross Boatman (pictured) was introduced as Dana's father, Harvey.

In June 2021, it was announced that Smith had been promoted to a regular cast member after her six-month testing period and that her father, Harvey Monroe (Ross Boatman), would be joining the series. Smith was excited for Boatman to play her father since she was a fan of his after seeing him on the BBC series Mum. Digital Spy's Sophie Dainty wrote that Dana is close to Harvey and that he would be protective of her when he is introduced to Bobby. After Dana and Bobby have sex, he reveals to Dana that years ago, he murdered his older sister Lucy Beale (Hetti Bywater) and the truth about his prison life. She is disgusted by what he has done and how he has lied, telling him their relationship is over. Digital Spy's Susannah Alexander wrote that Dana may have "been put off him for good after his revelations", hinting the end of their relationship. Bobby's half-brother, Peter Beale (Dayle Hudson), secretly contacts Dana and asks her to give Bobby another chance. While no there was no prior confirmation on if she would continue their relationship, the Radio Times predicted that the pair would reconcile. The pair eventually reconcile and initially decide against telling Harvey about Bobby's past. Actress Smith said that the decision to lie to her father causes Dana anxiety since she is close to Harvey and has never lied to him. She explained: "She's not a typical teenager that goes out to parties or sneaks out. She's never had a boyfriend before, it's all very new to her so she's worried about Harvey finding out." Smith added that since Harvey is a strict father, he may forbid the relationship, but expressed her personal hopes that their relationship continued as she liked the pairing.

After the introduction of Boatman's character, their characters were allotted a home set on the set of EastEnders. Smith found the experience unbelievable and surreal, accrediting her excitement to it being near the Beale family's house, which she felt is an iconic part of the EastEnders set. Smith also noted that having the set allowed her to play her role as Dana better, since the photographs of Boatman and herself around the flat allowed her to "feel immersed in their world". She expressed her enjoyment at working with Boatman, as she felt that she was learning from his acting experience. Smith added that despite his experience, Boatman is "happy to run with [her] ideas" for scenes which she felt allowed them to build a good father-daughter relationship with him, both on-screen and off-screen. In August 2021, it was announced that Charlie Wernham had been cast as Dana's older brother, Aaron Monroe. Digital Spy's Lisa Wehrstedt hinted that there would be tension between the siblings due to Dana often feeling shut out by Aaron, leading the pair to have a "strained relationship". Sen added that the siblings are the opposite to each other in terms of personality. Smith said that Dana's biggest issues with Aaron are his views, his arrogance and his stubbornness. She detests his Islamophobic and racist comments and makes continuous efforts to change his mindset. On her place in the Monroe family, Smith explained that if there was a power ranking, Dana would most likely be towards the bottom. However, despite not "having much sway", this does not stop Dana from trying to change things within the family. She added that despite being loyal to her family, she would also criticise their methods when she feels it is necessary. Smith has expressed her wishes to see Dana's mother introduced, as she felt that it would explain a lot about Dana's personality.

=== Attack and rocky relationships ===
In September 2021, it was revealed that Dana would be attacked in forthcoming scenes. Since Bobby and his friends are Muslims and are pushing for the opening of a mosque in Walford, Dana supports their movement. Harvey tries to dissuade Dana of her relationship with Bobby, but she remains adamant that she is happy with him. Whilst handing out flyers for the mosque, Dana notices a group of men saying racial slurs heading for them; they are all cornered and attacked by the group, with Dana getting "brutally" physically assaulted. A helpless Bobby watches on and is later "consumed with his own guilt" for not being able to prevent the attack. Dana becomes unsure about the future of their relationship due to his lack of action in the attack, and in an attempt to fix their relationship, Bobby tries to persuade Harvey that he would be a supportive boyfriend. Harvey tells Dana that she needs to forget about Bobby and go to university in Glasgow, which she is upset about. Dana is angry about him going to Harvey rather than her personally, and in "heartbreaking" scenes, Dana dumps Bobby. Dana tells Bobby: "I've spent my life having him make my decisions for me. I'm not going to spend my life with another man who thinks he can do the exact same thing. We're done." However, after seeing Bobby obsessively cleaning the kitchen at Walford East due to an OCD relapse, the pair talk and decide to reconcile. However, Sam Warner of Digital Spy hinted that Harvey may never truly approve of Bobby.

When Harvey makes a racist comment to Ash Kaur (Gurlaine Kaur Garcha), Dana pushes him to apologise to Ash. However, Aaron is furious with her for not sticking by their father, telling Dana to "keep [her] mouth shut". Wernham hinted that when his "controversial" character finds out that Dana is dating a Muslim, he would "have an opinion on whether he's good enough for her". It was later announced that Aaron would be a sinister villain on EastEnders. Dana does not initially know of his criminal nature and just thinks he is "arrogant and says ignorant things". However, Smith said that once Dana discovers his true self, there would be a lot for her to process. Dana informs Aaron that she is contemplating converting to Islam and Susannah Alexander's Digital Spy wrote that his fury could leave Dana in danger. EastEnders announced that Aaron's storyline would explore issues of racism and religious hatred and that Dana could be affected by a bombing he is involved in. After Aaron is arrested for trying to bomb the Albert and Bobby dumps Dana, Dana and Harvey plan to leave Walford, despite Dana believing that she could be pregnant. Bobby discovers of her potential pregnancy and proposes to her, to which she says no and confirms that she is not pregnant. Kathy sees the proposal and exposes the Monroes in front of a crowd for having a terrorist in their family.

Smith enjoyed the storyline as she felt is developed Dana as a character aside from being Bobby's love interest and appreciated being able to see more of her character. She also hoped that Dana and Bobby's angst had come to an end since she liked the pairing. However, Smith appreciated that the couple were normal and that teenagers could relate to their relationship since under all of the hardships, "they're two teenagers very much in love". She explained that their youth and lack of experience in serious relationships had contributed to them having trouble navigating their relationship. Smith was asked who she would like to film with in future, to which she said that Dana having interactions with Stacey Slater (Turner) would be interesting, especially since she is a fan of Turner. She was also asked which storylines she would implement if she was in charge. Smith said that she would love to see Dana in charge of people and executing her own visions, as well as working with people who have been radicalised and having "a bigger voice". Smith said that Dana would have been ready to accept his proposal if he was not doing it out of obligation to her. She said that despite being young and unready to get married, Dana is "so wrapped up in her love for Bobby that she doesn't always think logically". She hoped that the couple would get married one day and expressed her excitement at the thought of filming a soap wedding, having loved Stacey and Bradley Branning's (Charlie Clements) as a child. However, she hoped that prior to a wedding, Dana would have been explored more as a singular character.

=== Departure ===
After Bobby breaks up with her, Dana's attention turns to his half brother, Peter. Smith said that viewers would hate the pairing since they had become invested in Dana being with Bobby. Smith admitted that if she were Dana's friend, she would warn her to stay away from Peter, since he is not a well-liked character. However, she felt that because Dana is naïve and innocent, she would not see an issue with a fling with Peter. Dana also begins to think about going to university to study nursing. Since she feels she has "less to lose", she longs for an exciting fling. Peter and Dana bond over their life issues, and she leans in for a kiss, which he rejects. Smith said that the rejection is a shock for Dana and that it would lead to awkwardness between the pair, specifically because Dana has no friends so she has to see him every day afterwards. She admitted that she wants a showdown between the brothers over the moment, since she felt it would be "quintessentially EastEnders". She also acknowledged that despite Bobby ending the relationship between the pair, he will yearn to get her back. She hinted that this would cause friction between the three of them.

Speaking of the scenes ahead of her in June 2022, Smith said that then-newly appointed executive producer Chris Clenshaw would make his mark over an "exciting" summer 2022. It was later confirmed that the planned storyline would result in Dana's departure from the soap, with Smith being axed from the series alongside three other characters axed by Clenshaw. On her axing, a show producer explained: "Whenever a new boss comes in, there's always going to be big changes and it's no different with Chris. He's been working hard behind the scenes since January and is really planning to shake things up, which means saying goodbye to some characters. It's nothing personal to any of the cast going, it's simply a creative decision – for big storylines to happen you have to say goodbye to people, that's the nature of soap." Days after news broke about her axing, Smith promised that her character would be given a fitting ending. She was excited to film her final scenes as Dana since she gets "the send-off that she deserves" and acknowledged that it was time for Dana to "spread her wings". Smith admitted that it made sense for her to be axed since Dana was of the age to leave her family home. She also confirmed that she would return to EastEnders in the future if asked, especially since Harvey would remain on the series, meaning a potential return would be possible.

== Reception ==
Susan Knox of the Daily Mirror described Dana as a "brunette beauty" and noted that Smith is a talented actress. Knox added that Dana and Bobby's relationship "has kept fans gripped" and felt that it would continue to do so in forthcoming scenes. The Daily Mirror reported that viewers of EastEnders were "delighted" to see Dana kiss Bobby, specifically due to the lack of social distancing during the scenes. Viewers were "happy to witness some normality again", since the impact of the COVID-19 pandemic on television meant that cast members on the soap had to socially distance. The scene of Bobby stopping Dana from leaving Walford was nominated for Feel Good Moment at the 2021 Inside Soap Awards. Smith was also nominated in the newcomer categories at the 2021 I Talk Telly Awards and Digital Spy Reader Awards for her portrayal of Dana. Viewers were horrified by Dana's attack from the Islamophobic gang, with many Tweeting that the attack was too violent and hoping that Dana would be okay.

After scenes of Harvey and Aaron being casually racist, the Metro's Calli Kitson appreciated that Dana is nothing like them, adding that viewers have noticed the difference too. OK! magazine wrote that Dana "lights up screens" and that she has proved popular with viewers. Metro's Duncan Lindsay said that it is not common a soap character is genuinely nice and has no ulterior motives so Dana is a "breath of fresh air" for EastEnders. Smith noted that she had received numerous messages from fans "saying they love her, she has a heart of gold and they want to protect her", as well as complimenting her acting skills. In February 2022, Inside Soap's Kate White wrote that Dana and Bobby are an "adorable duo" and hoped that their families would allow them to stay together. White's colleague, Alice Penwill, wrote that Bobby and Dana are "the definition of love's young dream". Smith told the magazine that she was surprised to have such a positive reaction to the couple.
