= Aaron Monroe =

Fictional character from EastEnders

- EastEnders character
- Portrayed by: Charlie Wernham
- Duration: 2021–2022
- First appearance: Episode 6363; 21 October 2021
- Last appearance: Episode 6475; 26 April 2022
- Introduced by: Jon Sen
In-universe information
- Occupation: Businessman
- Father: Harvey Monroe
- Sisters: Dana Monroe

Aaron Monroe is a fictional character from the BBC soap opera EastEnders, played by Charlie Wernham. Wernham auditioned for the role over Zoom and was cast as Aaron, the son of established character Harvey Monroe (Ross Boatman) and older brother of Dana Monroe (Barbara Smith). He first appeared in episode 6363, broadcast on 21 October 2021. Wernham was open about his joy to be cast in EastEnders, as it had been a childhood dream of his. Across his stint, Aaron's storylines have included his relationship with Tiffany Butcher (Maisie Smith), involvement with a far-right terrorist organisation, and his eventual arrest and struggles in prison.

Initially billed as a suave, opinionated, and cocky businessman, Aaron was soon revealed to be involved in an Islamophobic hate group. The storyline required advisors on-set to ensure accuracy. Despite acknowledging the seriousness of the plot, Wernham was happy to play a villain. Aaron saw an unannounced exit, which was confirmed after his last appearance in episode 6475, broadcast on 26 April 2022. Aaron's character was generally disliked by viewers, but Wernham often received supportive messages online for his portrayal.

== Development ==
=== Casting and introduction ===
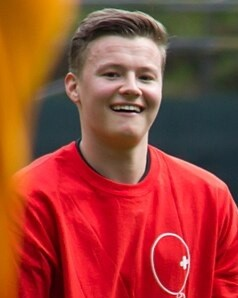
Charlie Wernham (pictured) plays Aaron.

In August 2021, it was announced that actor Charlie Wernham had been cast as Aaron, the son of Harvey Monroe (Ross Boatman) and older brother of Dana Monroe (Barbara Smith). Wernham auditioned for the part over Zoom and received the news that he won the role a few days later. Wernham commented that it was "always a childhood dream" of his to be on EastEnders as it is "constantly on TV in [his] household as [his] family are massive fans", adding that the show was "close to [his] heart". He later added that gaining a role on the show was on his "acting bucket list" since his childhood, as he watched it growing up and was often told by peers that he would fit the show. The actor continued by calling the role "perfect" for him, and was particularly impressed as "Aaron has got a lot of layers and a lot of stuff to do". He said that his new role was one that, in his words: "[he] would have bitten your hand off to get". Executive producer Jon Sen expressed excitement to welcome Wernham to the series, stating: "We're very happy to be welcoming Charlie to Walford. His character Aaron joins the Monroes, our newest family set to move into the Square with connections to the Beales". Wernham began filming in August 2021.

Aaron's arrival was initially set to occur in the Autumn of 2021. It was later announced that Aaron would arrive on 21 October, to Dana's chagrin. While Aaron would initially plan for a short visit, it was teased that he would eventually decide "to hang around a while longer". Wernham commented that Aaron's arrival would "kick up a bit of a storm". The character's arrival teased a romance between Aaron and Tiffany Butcher (Maisie Smith) after the two go out on a date. It was later revealed that Aaron would play a role in a storyline about casual racism his father was at the centre of, with Aaron set to "cause some big waves" in the storyline. He made his first appearance in the episode broadcast on 21 October 2021.

=== Characterisation and family ===
Aaron was billed as a "confident", "fiercely loyal" man who "likes to get his own way". Sen teased that "there's more to Aaron than his bravado lets on". Wernham called his character a wealthy, and "very confident" young man who likes to "splash" his money about. The actor teased viewers could expect "quite a lot of fun scenes" with Aaron at first, where he would try to be the "life and soul" and start "winding people up". Wernham noted the character enjoyed "having a laugh with people" and being "flirty". Despite Aaron's positive traits, Wernham warned that his character was very opinionated and "likes to have the last word". As Harvey was involved in a storyline about casual racism, Wernham teased that Aaron's opinionated nature would become apparent, as his character would "definitely give his opinion" on the matter and would "try to take control of the situation", despite it apparently coming from "a good place". Wernham commented that Aaron has a divisive personality amongst the residents of Walford, explaining "a few people will like him and there's a few people who he'll rub up the wrong way".

The third and final member of the Monroe family to be introduced, Aaron's backstory states that he was raised by his father in Walford before leaving to pursue his career in finance. He was said to be "close" with his father Harvey, despite being "nothing" like him, but his relationship with Dana was "strained" as she "often feels shut out by him". Sen observed that the character was the "opposite" of his sister. Wernham described Aaron as being "protective" and "quite dominating" over Dana, tending to see himself as "the man of the house" as he wanted to protect his family, keep them safe, and for others to respect them.

=== Terrorism and arrest ===
In November 2021, the show teased that Harvey would "make a disturbing discovery" about Aaron. The announcement followed a scene where Aaron is Islamophobic towards Bobby Beale (Clay Milner Russell) and would involve Harvey finding one of Aaron's shirts covered in blood. It was later revealed that Aaron was involved in a terrorist attack against a Muslim taxi driver and is affiliated with an Islamophobic gang. In early December 2021, it was announced that the soap would tackle how Aaron's actions impacted the Square over the upcoming Christmas. Set to involve a bomb plot, the BBC teased: "EastEnders has a huge winter ahead with plenty of drama in store for the viewers". A new character, Neil Hughes (Thomas Coombes) was set to be introduced for the story and viewers were set to see how Aaron was "entrenched" in the group. The show consulted with experts, including Exit UK's founder Nigel Bromage, during production to depict the plot as accurately as possible. Sen stated that EastEnders intends to tackle "challenging yet prescient" stories, with Aaron's being tackled as the show aimed to portray "the faulty logic" of far-right ideologies and extremists.

Wernham considered the story to be a "really tough", but necessary one to portray, with the actor admitting he felt "privileged" to play an antagonist. In response to Aaron's "shocking" New Year's Eve plot, Harvey was teased to be "horrified" by the revelation. After choosing not to go through with the plot, the show teased a "police shock" for Aaron and his gang. When Aaron is threatened into remaining with the group, it was announced that he would be cornered into leading a terror attack in Manchester. Having had enough of the situation, Harvey reported Aaron to the police.

=== Imprisonment and departure ===
In January 2022, the show teased Harvey having to make a "big decision" after visiting Aaron in prison. Harvey was later announced to be torn between giving a witness statement which would incriminate Aaron. Throughout March and April, Aaron is subjected to several prison attacks. Aaron is left in critical condition after being stabbed in prison. In June 2022, the show confirmed Aaron's exit after being sentenced and transferred to a prison in Newcastle. The soap confirmed that Aaron was always intended to only star in the far-right story.

== Storylines ==
After arriving, Aaron begins dating Tiffany Butcher (Maisie Smith), despite missing several dates. It transpires that Aaron is a member of a far-right extremist organisation. After his father Harvey Monroe (Ross Boatman) finds a shirt of Aaron's in the bin covered in blood, it is revealed that Aaron and his gang targeted a person of colour, which left the man with a punctured lung, broken ribs and possible blindness, to Harvey's fury. Aaron begs Harvey to provide an alibi for him when police investigate the attack, to which Harvey agrees on the condition Aaron ends his affiliation with the group. Despite getting the alibi, Aaron remains a prominent member in the organisation and he spray paints a swastika on the Argee Bhajee restaurant after it is suggested to be converted into a mosque.

Aaron arranges an attack on Tiffany's ex, Keegan Baker (Zack Morris), and while he walks home, some of Aaron's gang members jump him and almost beat him to death, leaving him hospitalised. After Christmas, Aaron and one of his closest affiliates, Neil Hughes (Thomas Coombes), plan an arson terrorist attack on The Argee Bhajee after Aaron's sister, Dana (Barbara Smith), expresses interest in converting to Islam due to her relationship with Bobby Beale (Clay Milner Russell). Neil later obtains a bomb and plants it there. Neil gives Aaron a burner phone that will set off the bomb when activated; however, Aaron struggles to keep Dana and Harvey out of the bomb's proximity, only to be further pressured when Neil warns him that there will be consequences if the attack isn't successful. Harvey spots them and, able to tell something is wrong, confronts a drunken Aaron. Aaron admits their plan and abandons it when Harvey threatens to inform Neil's grandmother.

Aaron briefly cuts off the gang, but when Neil talks to him, he assumes Aaron went to the police and the two fight. Harvey tries to keep Aaron from the gang, but it becomes clear where Aaron's true loyalties lie. After it seems Aaron is set to perform another terror attack, Harvey reports his son to the police and Aaron is arrested. Harvey visits Aaron in prison to disown him, to which Aaron pretends not to care. Later, Harvey prepares to sign his witness statement, but Aaron calls and begs him not to, as he is being beaten in prison. Harvey decides to sign the statement regardless to achieve justice for Aaron's victims. Neil later attacks Harvey and tells him to deliver a phone to Aaron, which Harvey refuses to do. Harvey visits Aaron and informs him of what happened before Aaron apologises for everything he had put his father through over the years. Later, Aaron is stabbed in prison by Neil's associates and is hospitalised. When he recovers, Aaron is sentenced and transferred to a prison in Newcastle.

== Reception ==
Ali Ayaan of MyLondon reported audiences being "shocked" by an early scene showing Aaron washing blood from his hands, and noted that many viewers were speculating where the blood came from. Justin Harp of Digital Spy commented that the scene was "shocking". After a week on the soap, Stephen Patterson of the Metro said the character has "made quite the impression", and that fans were unconvinced that Aaron was "the nice guy" he was pretending to be, with many viewers correctly predicting that he was part of an extremist group. Sophie Dainty of Digital Spy deemed Aaron "dangerous". Harp observed that since Aaron's arrival, the character "had a disturbing impact on those around him". On an Instagram post where Wernham opened up about the challenges of filming a controversial story, Dan Seddon of Digital Spy noted the comments being generally supportive of Wernham and praising his acting ability. Following scenes where Aaron discusses the bomb plot with his associates, Harp described them as "disturbing". He further described scenes where he confesses the plot to Harvey as "gripping". James Rodger of Birmingham Mail commented fans having "grown frustrated" by Aaron's violent antics and noted calls for the character to be axed from the soap. Harp deemed the reveal that Harvey reported Aaron to the authorities as a "massive twist". Following the Wernham's departure, Grace Morris of What's On TV reported fans "rejoice" Aaron's exit.

== See also ==
- List of soap opera villains
