= Bobby Beale (EastEnders) =

Fictional character from EastEnders

- EastEnders character
- Clay Milner Russell as Bobby Beale (2024)
- Portrayed by: Kevin Curran (2003–2007); Alex Francis (2007–2012); Rory Stroud (2013–2014); Eliot Carrington (2014–2017); Clay Milner Russell (2019–2024)
- Duration: 2003–2017, 2019–2024
- First appearance: Episode 2557; 24 July 2003
- Last appearance: Episode 6982; 19 September 2024
- Introduced by: Louise Berridge (2003); Sean O'Connor (2017); Kate Oates (2019)
- Eliot Carrington as Bobby Beale (2016)
In-universe information
- Occupation: Waiter; Restaurant manager
- Family: Beale
- Father: Ian Beale
- Mother: Laura Beale
- Adoptive mother: Jane Beale
- Stepmother: Sharon Watts
- Half-brothers: Peter Beale; Steven Beale (adoptive)
- Half-sisters: Lucy Beale; Cindy Williams (foster)
- Grandfathers: Pete Beale; Norman Dunn; Roger Clarke (adoptive)
- Grandmothers: Kathy Beale; Edwina Dunn; Linda Clarke (adoptive)
- Uncles: David Wicks; Ben Mitchell; Christian Clarke (adoptive)
- Nephews: Louie Beale; Jimmy Beale
- First cousins: Bianca Jackson; Joe Wicks; Lexi Pearce
- Other relatives: Pauline Fowler; Martin Fowler; Tiffany Butcher

Bobby Beale is a fictional character from the BBC soap opera EastEnders, who made his first appearance in episode 2557, originally broadcast on 24 July 2003. The character was originally played by Kevin Curran as an infant. Prior to his introduction, Bobby's paternity is at the centre of a storyline and is resolved when Ian Beale (Adam Woodyatt) is revealed as Bobby's father. His mother, Laura Beale (Hannah Waterman), is killed off in 2004 and Bobby's stepmother, Jane Beale (Laurie Brett), later adopts Bobby. Curran was replaced by Alex Francis in 2007. Following Jane's departure, Bobby finds a mother figure in Mandy Salter (Nicola Stapleton) and is upset when she leaves.

When Francis decided to concentrate on his schooling, the character was recast again, with Rory Stroud in the role. Producers decided to recast the character again in 2014 and the character did not appear for six months to aid this transition. When he returned, Bobby was portrayed by Eliot Carrington. Bobby was placed at the centre of the "Who Killed Lucy Beale?" story following his return and was later revealed to be the killer. The story continued until show bosses decided to write out the character, while he was in prison. Bobby departed in episode 5303, first broadcast on 17 June 2016. Carrington reprised the role in 2017 for a cameo appearance in episode 5582, originally broadcast on 17 October, as part of Jane's exit from the series. The character's return was confirmed in April 2019, with the role recast again, to actor Clay Milner Russell. He returned in the second episode broadcast on 13 June 2019. In April 2024, it was announced that Milner Russell had decided to leave the soap after five years. His exit aired on 19 September 2024.

Following his return, Bobby's storylines have included exploring the Islamic faith, being bullied by Dennis Rickman Jnr (Bleu Landau) which leads to his being hospitalised in a Islamophobic attack, a feud with his older half-brother Peter Beale (Dayle Hudson), being infatuated with Dotty Cotton (Milly Zero), becoming a suspect in his father's attack, a relationship with Dana Monroe (Barbara Smith), a friendship with Freddie Slater (Bobby Brazier), falling in love with Anna Knight (Molly Rainford), unaware that she is Lucy and Peter's half-sister, a feud with Peter and Anna's mother Cindy Beale (Michelle Collins), being involved in a love triangle with Anna and Freddie, and discovering that Anna had aborted their child, leading to his departure from the square.

== Creation and development ==
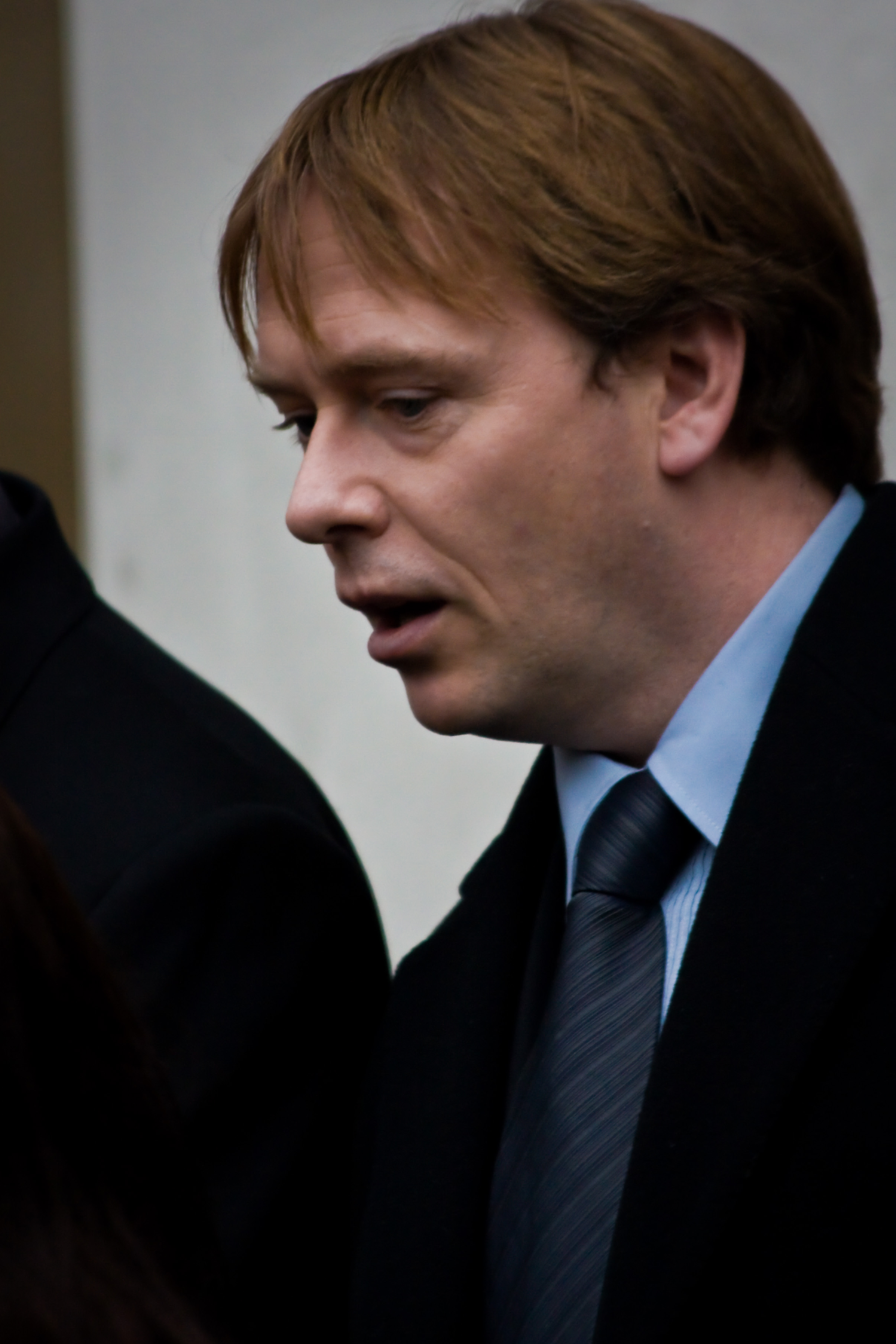
Adam Woodyatt (pictured) plays Bobby's biological father, Ian Beale.

Bobby has overcome a complicated start in life — Garry thought he was his father until a blood test proved it was Ian. Not to mention enduring the revolving door of his father's love life...Bobby's biological mum, Laura, died in dubious circumstances. Jane was the closest thing to a mum he had, but she left, unable to endure another minute as Mrs Beale. Mandy took over the unlikely role of 'mum' for a while until she too left The Square.

— A reporter from the EastEnders website on Bobby (2013)

In December 2003, Neil Wilkes of Digital Spy revealed a forthcoming "baby bombshell" storyline involving Garry Hobbs (Ricky Groves) torn between Laura Beale (Hannah Waterman) and Lynne Hobbs (Elaine Lordan). Garry mistakenly believes that Laura's unborn child is his but it is in fact Ian Beale's (Adam Woodyatt) who is oblivious to this information. It was then confirmed that Laura was to be killed in an "explosive exit" after she comes clean with both Garry and Ian. An EastEnders insider said in May 2004 "Garry's grown to love Bobby despite all the trouble caused by his night of passion with Ian's wife Laura". In July 2007, Laurie Brett who plays Jane Collins said that Bobby will start becoming "a bit of a handful". In December 2009. a writer for the Sunday Mail said that when Bobby went missing, it made viewers feel sorry for Ian for a change. In February 2010, Woodyatt said that Bobby's character was a fail-safe option if the live episode of EastEnders went wrong saying "We've all got our little strategies in case it goes wrong. I'm going upstairs to check on Bobby. Steve Mac is going to say, 'I've had enough of this' and just walk out." When Nicola Stapleton reprises her role as Mandy Salter, she said that there a part of Mandy that wants to be maternal as she gets on well with Bobby, who becomes her "little mate". In January 2013, after leaving EastEnders, Laurie Brett said "I would never say never to going back, as I loved playing Jane. She's Bobby's mum and it will always be that way."

Digital Spy revealed on 31 January 2013 that Alex Francis departed from EastEnders to "concentrate more on school commitments". The executive producer of EastEnders, Lorraine Newman, said of Francis' departure "Alex has been a highly valued member of the EastEnders cast and we wish him the best for the future." The role of Bobby was recast to Rory Stroud and started appearing as Bobby from 1 March 2013. In April 2013, when Ben Hardy is recast as Bobby's brother Peter Beale, he said "Ian's wonderful relationship with Denise and the inclusion of Lucy, Peter and Bobby in the household will reinvigorate the clan with vibrancy and energy. I am really looking forward to seeing them all together on screen." Additionally, in June 2013, upon the announcement that Bobby's adoptive sister, Cindy Williams, would return to the programme, new actress Mimi Keene said "with Peter, Lucy Beale (Hetti Bywater), Bobby and Cindy to contend with, it'll be a lively household".

=== Third recast, Lucy's murder and departure ===
Producers decided to recast the character again in 2014 from Stroud to child actor Eliot Carrington. Carrington was chosen to play Bobby because producers wanted an actor with "emotional depth". Bobby departs the series with Jane in May 2014, marking Stroud's final appearance in the role. Six months later, the character returned with Carrington now in the role. At the time, the Beale family were at the centre of the "Who Killed Lucy Beale?" storyline, a whodunit plot following the murder of Bobby's half-sister Lucy, which leads to the show's thirtieth anniversary episodes. A flashback episode, which features the reveal of Lucy's killer, was commissioned as part of the anniversary episodes. Executive producer Dominic Treadwell-Collins wanted the reveal to be different from previous whodunit reveals which revealed the character in one line. He told Mark Wilson of The Guardian that the reveal of Lucy's killer would be "more complicated" and would involve multiple conversations. Minimal people knew about the identity of Lucy's killer to avoid any leaks with more members of the cast and crew being informed over the course of the storyline.

In the flashback episode, Bobby is revealed as the murderer with Jane hiding his secret. The character had not been part of the official list of suspects, but Treadwell-Collins warned that any character could be the killer. He confirmed that another character was originally the killer, while he had considered making Jane and Cindy the murderers. Story producer Alex Lamb then suggested making Bobby the murderer during a discussion with Treadwell-Collins, series producer Sharon Batten and script producer Manpreet Dosanjh after a story conference. They chose a family member as a culprit because they wanted to relate the story to the show's original premise: a "kitchen sink drama" focusing on family. Treadwell-Collins explained that he wanted the story to be "emotional and come from the heart". The story team intertwined Bobby's recast with the story. Treadwell-Collins commented, "If you look at the pieces now, Jane took Bobby away! We cleverly, I hope, seeded everything." Bobby's attack on Lucy was not filmed, which the executive producer said was a "conscious decision" because he thought it would be "too much" for a child actor.

Treadwell-Collins sought permission from Carrington's father before agreeing to make Bobby the murderer and told Mark Jefferies of the Daily Mirror that if he had objected to the story, he planned to recast the character again. He informed Carrington of the twist on the evening of 16 February 2015, three days before the live reveal, to gauge a response. Carrington was pleased with the twist and thought it made sense for Jane to hide Bobby's secret. Treadwell-Collins praised Carrington, calling him "a very intelligent little boy and very emotionally mature". Bywater, who portrays Lucy, was surprised by the twist, having discovered during rehearsals on the morning of the episode.

Producers then placed the character at the centre of a subsequent story for the Beale family as they try to maintain the secret. Treadwell-Collins wanted to continue the story and compared the twist to the novel We Need to Talk About Kevin, which is about a teenage killer. Bobby is unaware that he caused the death of his sister, which Treadwell-Collins thought was important because he did not want to make a child an aware murderer. The story team wanted to explore whether the character is evil and how Ian and Jane would respond to that situation. The story continued to be explored until show bosses decided to conclude the storyline. After attacking Jane with a hockey stick, Bobby admits it was him because he didn't want to leave his old school, he is arrested by the police for Assault occasioning in Actual Bodily Harm against Jane. As Bobby is being interviewed by the police, he admits he killed Lucy, and the police go into further investigations against him. Bobby is then charged with her murder and Jane's attack. In scenes originally broadcast in June 2016, the storyline ends as Bobby is sentenced to four years imprisonment for grievous bodily harm with Intent and murder: three years for Lucy's murder, and one year for Jane's attack. This marks Carrington's departure from the series and he leaves in episode 5303, first broadcast on 17 June 2016.

Jane was written out of the series in October 2017. As part of Brett's exit from the serial, Carrington filmed a cameo appearance as Bobby and he appears in episode 5582, originally broadcast on 17 October. In the scene, Bobby is featured on footage, filmed by a fellow prisoner, and shown to Jane by Max Branning (Jake Wood) as a threat.

=== Reintroduction and Islam ===
The character was referenced in scenes first broadcast in February 2019 as Ian receives a letter about Bobby's release date, sparking speculation that he could return. In April 2019, Laura-Jayne Tyler of Inside Soap confirmed that Bobby would be reintroduced to EastEnders during that year for "an explosive story". She did not rule out Carrington reprising the role.

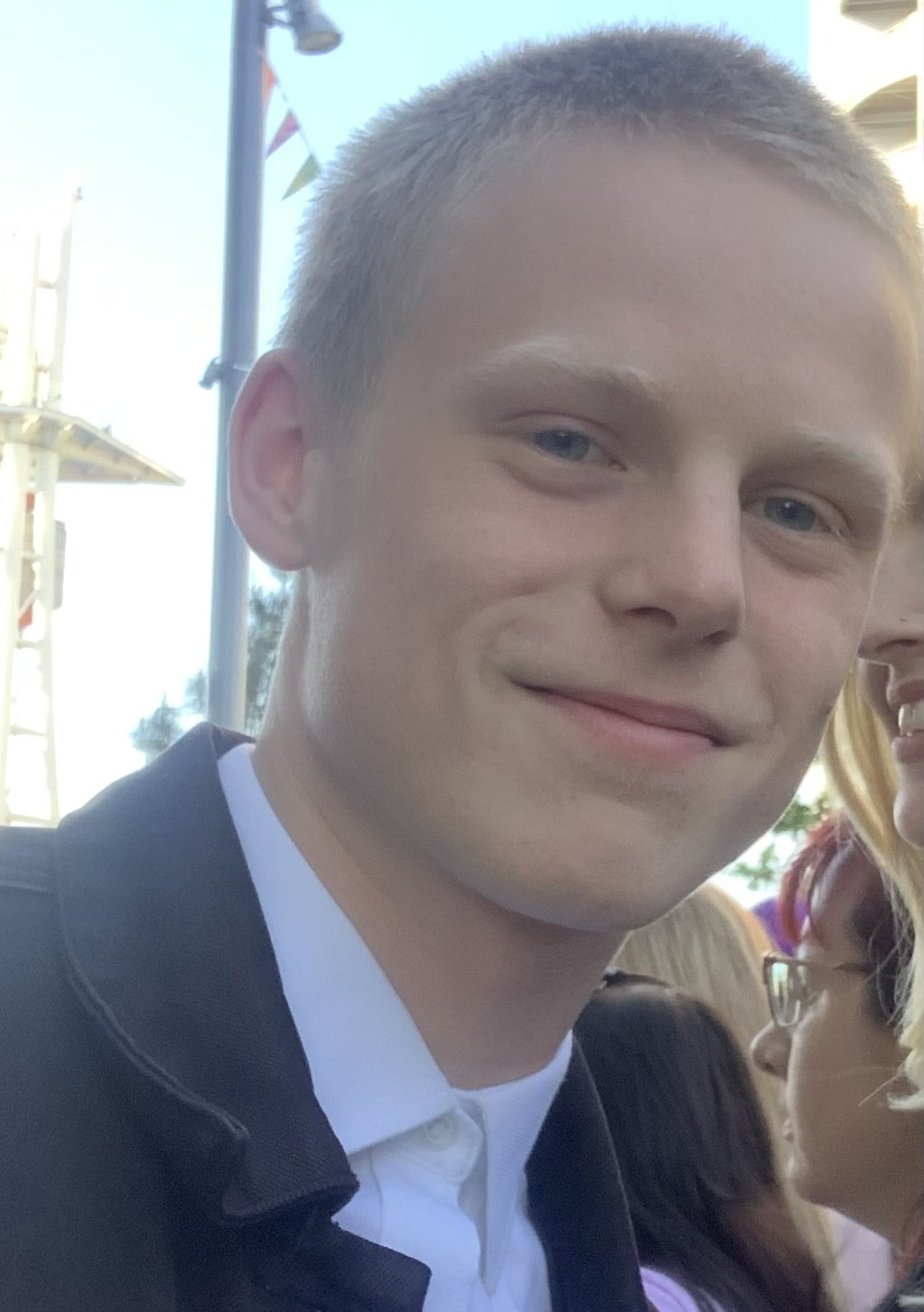
Clay Milner Russell became the fifth actor to portray Bobby from 2019 to 2024.

On 3 June 2019, it was confirmed that the role had been recast, with actor Clay Milner Russell now in the role. Hollyoaks actor Billy Price revealed in 2021 that he auditioned for the role, and made it "quite far" into the audition process. He explained that excluding him, there were three other actors in the running for the role. Bobby returns in episode 5937, originally broadcast on 13 June 2019, after being released from prison and is greeted by his grandmother, Kathy Beale (Gillian Taylforth). The show's executive producer, Jon Sen, expressed his excitement at the casting, commenting, "Clay's an exciting new talent with a charisma and an intensity that injects a new energy into the fascinating character of Bobby Beale". He added that Bobby's return would have repercussions for other characters.

Following his return, producers placed Bobby in a new story exploring Islamic faith. The character decides to convert after meeting Imran (Reda Elazouar) in prison, who encourages him to make peace with himself and the past. Bobby is subsequently portrayed as exploring his faith while receiving mixed reactions from the community. EastEnders worked with the charity Muslim Youth Helpline on the story, and aimed to portray "the positive impact of religion". Sen expressed his delight at tackling the subject and working with the Muslim Youth Helpline. He explained that he wanted to "challenge preconceptions and prejudices" about faith in young people and "demonstrate the positive impact of religion in modern society". Zohra Khaku, the director of the charity, believed that it is "heartening" to see a positive portrayal of Islam in a character amidst a time when the religion is negatively portrayed.

== Storylines ==
=== 2003–2017 ===
When Laura Beale (Hannah Waterman) gives birth to Bobby, her estranged husband Ian Beale (Adam Woodyatt) refuses to acknowledge the possibility of being Bobby's father because he had a vasectomy prior to Bobby's conception; also, Laura had been unfaithful with Garry Hobbs (Ricky Groves). When Bobby (Kevin Curran) needs a blood transfusion, Ian is proved to be Bobby's father and Laura names Ian as Bobby's father when she registers his birth. Ian does not find out until Pat Evans (Pam St Clement) finds the birth certificate after Laura's sudden death. Afterwards, Ian brings Bobby to live with him and his half-siblings, Peter Beale (Joseph Shade) and Lucy Beale (Casey Anne Rothery). Ian's girlfriend and later wife Jane Beale (Laurie Brett), joins the household; she becomes Bobby's stepmother and values him as her own child, increasingly so following an emergency hysterectomy.

Ian enters Bobby (now Alex Francis) into a talent contest but cheats by enlisting another child to sing while Bobby mimes. When Ian's deceit is revealed, Bobby is left exposed and upset. Jane leaves temporarily and Bobby becomes troubled. When Ian catches Bobby bullying his cousin Tiffany Butcher (Maisie Smith) and confronts him, Bobby shouts that he wants Jane. He disappears from school to look for Jane, and it is Jane who finds him. She formally adopts him. Bobby and Ian plan a surprise 40th-birthday party for her, but when they see her kissing a man named Martin (Alisdair Harvey), Ian's reaction leads Jane to divorce him, leaving Walford to protect Bobby from their acrimonious arguments. In August, Bobby is misinformed of Jane's death after Ian starts telling people he is a widower. Bobby is upset so Ian tells him that he was only joking and calls Jane to prove that she is alive. When Mandy Salter (Nicola Stapleton) moves in with them, she and Bobby start to bond but Bobby still visits Jane, and she briefly returns to Walford prior to accepting a catering job in Wales. When Mandy dumps Ian, he suffers a nervous breakdown and goes missing, leaving Bobby in Lucy's (now Hetti Bywater) care. Several weeks later Ian returns after having been living homeless, scaring Bobby with his unkempt appearance.

Bobby and Ian visit family in America. Soon after returning, Bobby (now Rory Stroud) takes a romantic interest in Tiffany. When Tiffany's mother, Bianca Butcher (Patsy Palmer), trashes Ian's new restaurant, Ian agrees not to go to the police in exchange for Bobby and Tiffany not seeing each other anymore. Tiffany and Bobby then start meeting in secret. When Bobby participates in a school spelling competition competing against Tiffany, it is revealed that they have broken up. Bobby is delighted when Jane returns to Walford and plans to buy into Ian's restaurant.

The Beale family are distraught when Lucy is murdered. After Jane breaks down in Ian's arms, they sleep together and Ian hopes they will reconcile. He tells Bobby they are getting back together, but Jane is annoyed and shouts at Ian. When Bobby tries to intervene, an angry Ian tells him he will never be as good as Lucy. Realizing that Ian needs time to grieve, Jane decides to leave Walford with Bobby. They depart abruptly, briefly returning for Lucy's funeral in May. In November, Jane returns to report that Bobby has gone missing. When found in Walford, Bobby (now Eliot Carington) says that he wants to move back to Albert Square. Jane agrees, but later she is concerned when she finds a casefile which Bobby has compiled with the intention of solving Lucy's murder.

On the night of Ian and Jane's remarriage, it is revealed in a flashback episode that Bobby had accidentally killed Lucy ten months before, after attacking her with a jewellery box out of frustration at her actions, Jane tells a heartbroken Ian, Peter and Cindy Williams that she killed Lucy, but Ian realises that she is lying and that Bobby is the culprit. Jane admits that she had moved Lucy's body, and convinced Bobby that he had not caused Lucy's death. The Beales then agree to keep the circumstances of Lucy's death a secret from Bobby, the police, and the residents of Walford. Peter later makes peace with Bobby before emigrating to New Zealand.

Afterwards, Bobby continuously walks in between Ian and Jane's conversations about him killing Lucy, where they nervously shake it off and tell him they were discussing something else. When Ian's half-brother Ben Mitchell (Harry Reid), who is Phil's son, is arrested for Lucy's murder, Jane reveals to Ian that she kept the phone and purse that Ben stole from her. Bobby soon finds them and takes them to the police station, but is stopped by Phil who sees the objects and takes Bobby back home. Phil demands of Jane where she got the objects, and as he threatens her, Bobby brandishes a golf club and threatens Phil, but is stopped by Ian. Ben is soon released when Lucy's former lover Max Branning (Jake Wood) is arrested for the killing. Now convinced that Max killed Lucy, Bobby tries to smash his car with a brick, but is stopped by Cindy and taken home where she berates him as nothing more than a "stupid little boy", which makes Bobby angry and pushes her. Bobby loses his temper and pushes Cindy as Jane walks in, causing Cindy to graze her head and land where Lucy died. Cindy snaps at Ian when Bobby leaves the room and her words convince Jane to confess to Carol the truth of Lucy's death. Left alone, Cindy then tells her boyfriend Liam Butcher (James Forde), who is Tiffany's brother and Carol's grandson, that Bobby had killed Lucy. Bobby is increasingly confused by Jane's behaviour but the revealing video message Cindy sends him is opened by Phil's wife Sharon Mitchell (Letitia Dean) and deleted by Ian, who begs Sharon not to reveal what she heard.

Bobby is furious when his grandmother Kathy Beale (Gillian Taylforth) returns to Walford and Ian and Jane decide to move her into Bobby's bedroom and move Bobby into Lucy's old bedroom. Jane catches Bobby trying to swap the rooms back in secret and a physical scuffle ensues, which results in Bobby deliberately pushing Jane down the stairs. After she regains consciousness, Kathy arrives and Jane lies that she tripped and fell when helping Bobby move the last items from his bedroom. However, after hearing Kathy and Jane talking later, Bobby accidentally reveals to Kathy that he pushed Jane down the stairs, leaving Kathy shocked at his violent streak. Bobby starts a feud with Sharon's son, Dennis Rickman Jnr (Bleu Landau), which escalates when Bobby cruelly kills Dennis' pet spider.

Sharon tells Kathy that Bobby is evil and needs help, and Kathy tells Sharon that Bobby pushed Jane down the stairs, so Sharon decides to report Bobby to the police about Lucy's killing but agrees to wait until after Christmas. Dennis tells Bobby that he killed Lucy, having overheard it from Sharon and Phil. Ian and Jane soon realise that Bobby knows the truth, and Ian makes a deal with Phil to stop Sharon going to the police. Bobby then tells Ian what he knows and Ian confirms it is true. Jane then decides they should go to the police, as they are no longer protecting Bobby from the truth, but Ian comes up with another plan to help Bobby's anger issues and the family agree to send him to boarding school. He leaves late in January 2016 after Ian bribes the school to take him early.

In May 2016, Bobby returns home from school for the holidays, happy having won a hockey award. Ian decides against selling the family restaurant when he comes under pressure from the market traders which means they cannot afford to continue paying Bobby's school fees. Bobby overhears Jane talking about this and lashes out, smashing her car wing mirror with his hockey stick. The next day, Jane catches Bobby packing a bag and he says he is returning to school, and when Jane picks up the phone to call Ian and tell him this, Bobby attacks her; hitting her on the head and striking her legs with his hockey stick. He then leaves her unconscious in their home, goes into the Queen Vic and confesses in front of everyone there that he has killed Jane and he killed Lucy too. Ian attempts to get Bobby away from the scene but Mick Carter (Danny Dyer) stops him, and instead Ian, Sharon and Kathy go to the house and find Jane critically injured. Ian accompanies Jane in the ambulance but denies Bobby access. He is later arrested after confessing to attacking Jane. Bobby then also confesses that he killed Lucy and reveals to DI Keeble that he has the murder weapon in his school locker. He is released pending charge for Lucy's murder.

Ian and his stepson Steven Beale (Aaron Sidwell) are told by doctors that Jane nearly died as a result of her injuries and that she may never walk again. Bobby is sharply rebuked by Ian for this attack but he seems genuinely upset about Jane and says that by confessing, he is seeking help. Bobby is charged with unlawful killing and denied bail by the Youth Court judge. He is kept in a youth detention centre until a preliminary hearing in Crown Court the following week. In court, Bobby pleads guilty to causing grievous bodily harm upon Jane with intent and unlawfully killing Lucy. He is given a custodial sentence of three years for killing Lucy and one year for the attack on Jane, with both sentences to run concurrently. After being sentenced to prison until June 2019, Bobby feels confident he can be released when solicitor Ritchie Scott (Sian Webber) informs him of potential to appeal, but following Jane's wishes, Ian convinces Bobby to avoid doing so, saying that he needs to accept what he did and carry out his punishment like he deserves. When Jane has begun to recover from her injuries, she wishes to visit Bobby, but Ian tells her that Bobby does not want to see either of them.

Months later, Ian visits Bobby off-screen to inform him of Steven's death and Jane being injured in a fire. When Ian returns from the visit, he informs Kathy that he is disappointed that Bobby did not seem to respond to the news the way he expected and he walked out the visiting room without saying a word. The following month, Max threatens Jane into leaving Walford. However, Kathy's rapist James Willmott-Brown (William Boyde) forces Max to ensure that Jane leaves without Ian. Therefore, Max shows Jane a video of Bobby being harassed by someone he does not recognise in his cell, and threatens to harm Bobby if Jane does not leave Walford alone.

=== 2019–2024 ===
Sixteen months later, Ian receives a letter saying that Bobby will be released in a matter of months, but he believes that Bobby will be better off with Jane. However, Kathy encourages Ian to tell Peter that Bobby is returning home and to be a father to Bobby and bring him back to Walford. Bobby is later released from prison in June 2019 and is greeted by Kathy at home. However, upon returning to Walford, he is not given a warm welcome back by the residents, especially Max, who never forgave him for watching him being wrongly sent to prison for Bobby's crime of killing Lucy, which led to ruining his relationship with his daughters Lauren (Jacqueline Jossa) and Abi Branning (Lorna Fitzgerald), ultimately causing Abi's death and Lauren's departure. Max eventually forgives Bobby and they develop a friendship, much to Ian's annoyance. Bobby reconnects with his friend Imran Qureshi (Reda Elazouar), whom he met in the Young Offenders Unit. It is revealed that Bobby is converting to Islam to help find peace with his past. Imran gifts him a Quran, and introduces him to the Muslim Ummah. Ian struggles to accept Bobby's faith but eventually comes around. Bobby begins to hallucinate Lucy around the Square and in the Beale house, and almost resorts to committing arson in his home, but Max stops him. After a conversation with Rainie Branning (Tanya Franks), Bobby takes drugs, and wanders onto the train tracks; he is saved by Callum Highway (Tony Clay). Bobby beings a friendship with Habiba (Rukku Nahar) and Iqra Ahmed (Priya Davdra), who encourage him to embrace Islam, and invite him to celebrate Eid with them. Bobby officially converts to Islam, but is enraged when Ian attempts to turn it into an event to promote himself as councillor. Ian chucks Bobby out of the house, and he goes to live with Habiba and Iqra, and is joined by his cousin, Bex Fowler (Jasmine Armfield).

Bobby's former nemesis Dennis begins to taunt him and after Bobby attacks him, Dennis starts posting Islamophobic abuse online about Bobby, which is spotted by Bex. Bobby is attacked on the way to mosque with Habiba and Iqra, and is strangled. He ends up going to hospital with a bleed on his brain, needing emergency surgery. Peter (now played by Dayle Hudson) returns after being contacted by Kathy, but he struggles to forgive Bobby for murdering Lucy. These events lead to Bobby developing OCD. He decides to set up a charity named Lucy Beale Foundation, in honour of his deceased sister and is helped by Max, which angers Ian. Max and Sharon become trustees, and Ian sneaks onto Sharon's laptop to steal £20,000 from the account of the Lucy Beale Foundation to repay Max the money he owes him. Bobby is unaware until Ian leaves Walford. Bobby later meets a girl, Jade (Libbi Fox) and they go on a date. When Jade goes to the toilet, Vinny Panesar (Shiv Jalota) tells Bobby about Lucas Johnson (Don Gilet) going on a date with Karen Taylor (Lorraine Stanley) and her finding out he's a murderer, which disheartens Bobby and he leaves before Jade returns. Soon after, Bobby finds Dana Monroe (Barbara Smith) on a dating app and she later becomes his girlfriend. He originally lies to her about his name so she does not discover his past, however, he later tells her the truth.

Bobby and Dana's relationship develops and he worries about sleeping with her as he is a virgin and sex outside marriage is a major sin in the Islamic faith. However, they later consummate their relationship shortly before Bobby's 18th birthday. Dana's father Harvey (Ross Boatman) is unhappy about their relationship due to Bobby's past, especially when Dana supports Bobby and Iqra in their campaign for a new mosque in Walford. Dana is later attacked by an Islamophobic gang, and he redevelops OCD, which Dana discovers and supports him. Bobby is wary of Dana's brother Aaron (Charlie Wernham) and Dana refuses to believe Bobby's suspicions. Aaron is revealed to be an Islamophobe with the intention of bombing the new mosque, and when Bobby discovers this and tells Dana, she refuses to believe him, ending their relationship. They reconcile and Dana agrees to revert to Islam, which Aaron refuses to accept. Aaron's plans are exposed and when he is arrested, Dana wrongly believes that Bobby had reported him to the police, but she discovers that it was Harvey. During a pause in their relationship, Dana believes that she is pregnant but she takes a test and realises that she is not pregnant. Bobby and Dana soon grow apart and she develops feelings for Peter. Dana and Peter sleep together, which Bobby later discovers. Peter decides to leave Walford after a confrontation with Bobby and Kathy, and Dana soon leaves Walford to go to university but makes amends with Bobby. Bobby takes over Ian's chip shop after Peter's absence and hesitantly employs Freddie Slater (Bobby Brazier). Although Freddie irritates Bobby initially, the pair become close friends.

Bobby and Freddie compete for the attention of sisters Gina (Francesca Henry) and Anna Knight (Molly Rainford), with Bobby becoming close to Anna. Kathy's fiancé Tom "Rocky" Cotton (Brian Conley) asks Bobby to find Ian and Peter (played again by Thomas Law) as Kathy wants them at their wedding, but Peter declines the offer. It is revealed that Ian's first wife, and Peter and Lucy's mother, Cindy Beale (Michelle Collins), is still alive, having been presumed dead for 25 years. Ian and Peter have been living with her in France. It also transpires that Cindy is Anna and Gina's estranged mother. Peter soon returns to Walford upon hearing that Gina and Anna are living at The Queen Vic, prompting Cindy and Ian to return as well. Bobby learns that Anna is Lucy's half-sister and fears she will hate him when she learns he murdered Lucy, however, Anna reveals she already knows. She later has a one-night stand with Freddie, which Bobby only learns about when Ian humiliates them by exposing their one-night stand to Bobby at The Queen Vic. Bobby struggles to get along with a resentful Cindy, who despises him for killing Lucy. After Peter and Rocky save Bobby from a fire in Kathy's Café, Cindy blames Bobby for Peter being on life support and wishes him dead. She later apologises, and they call a truce. Bobby and Anna decide to commit to a proper relationship, but Anna struggles with Bobby's timidity. When Ian and Peter act secretive, Bobby follows Peter to uncover what he is hiding. He discovers that Ian and Peter have been in contact with Jane, who wants to reconnect with Bobby. However, Bobby tells Jane that he cannot understand why she covered up Lucy's murder and disowns her. Bobby changes his mind and forgives Jane.

Bobby spends much time working at the chippy and Beale's Eels, and Anna becomes close to Freddie. Bobby is unaware that Anna and Freddie have feelings for each other, and Anna drifts apart from Bobby, in favour of spending time with Freddie. Unbeknownst to Bobby, Anna discovers she is pregnant but later decides to have an abortion in secret. Bobby becomes concerned about Anna's frequent sickness, and after a conversation with Ian, Peter and Lauren Branning (Jacqueline Jossa), he learns that she could be pregnant. When he tries to talk with Anna at The Queen Vic, he witnesses Anna and Freddie kissing. Bobby is also devastated when he discovers that Anna was actually pregnant and secretly had an abortion. Cindy intervenes in Bobby and Anna's relationship by convincing Bobby to leave Walford so Anna can begin a relationship with Freddie. Bobby agrees to move to The Cotswolds to live with Jane, which Ian initially protests. Before he leaves, Bobby visits Lucy's grave for closure and emotional healing, despite Cindy's objections. After rejecting Anna and Freddie, and an emotional farewell with his family, Bobby leaves Walford with Jane.

== Reception ==
Rory Stroud was nominated as "Best Young Actor" at the 2013 Inside Soap Awards. A reporter from the EastEnders website said "We feel for cute-as-a-button Bobby Beale, whose home life is about as stable as Kim Fox (Tameka Empson) in stilettoes after ladies' night at R&R." Meanwhile, Eliot Carrington was nominated for 'Best Bad Boy' and 'Best Young Actor' at the 2015 Inside Soap Awards. In September 2013, Stuart Heritage of The Guardian newspaper said that the character should be axed because Stroud "can actually act. He can speak in full sentences and walk around and stuff. That's not who Bobby Beale is. Bobby Beale should be mute and confused by everything, just like he was when Alex Francis played him."

In 2020, Sara Wallis and Ian Hyland from The Daily Mirror placed Bobby 100th on their ranked list of the Best EastEnders characters of all time, calling him a "baby-faced killer in the electric guitar PJs" who "shocked the world" when he was revealed to be Lucy's killer.

== See also ==
- List of soap opera villains
- "Who Killed Lucy Beale?"
