= Thendrale Ennai Thodu =

1985 Indian romantic comedy film

- Film poster
- Directed by: Sridhar
- Screenplay by: Sridhar; Chithralaya Gopu
- Story by: Sridhar
- Starring: Mohan; Jayashree
- Cinematography: Ashok Kumar
- Edited by: B. Lenin; V. T. Vijayan
- Music by: Ilaiyaraaja
- Production company: Devi Films
- Release date: 31 May 1985
- Running time: 134 minutes
- Country: India
- Language: Tamil

Thendrale Ennai Thodu (Oh Breeze, Touch Me) is a 1985 Indian Tamil-language romantic comedy film co-written and directed by Sridhar. The film stars Mohan and Jayashree (in her first film), with Thengai Srinivasan, Vennira Aadai Moorthy and Y. G. Mahendran in supporting roles. It was released on 31 May 1985 to critical acclaim, and was a box-office success.

== Plot ==
Malu, an independent young Tamil graduate in Madras whose car frequently breaks down, discovers that Raghunath (alias Raghu) is a pickpocket. The young man, on the way to an interview, misses his bus. He meets Malu and fixes her car, and she drives him to the interview. Raghu is angry to learn that the position has been filled, but Rajasekhar (one of the interviewers and Malu's father, appreciates his enthusiasm. Raghu is hired and meets his colleagues: Balu (an older, married man) and Ramu (a young, unmarried man).

Both men meet women via Ramaiya, who visits their workplace regularly. Ramu rents a room in Balu's house, and is joined by Raghu as a second tenant. Raghu encounters Malu and tells her the good news about his new job. Eventually, they fall in love. Malu tells Raghu that she is betrothed to Shankar, but eventually tells the truth. Happier than ever, they are part of love's young dream. Malu tells her father about her decision to marry Raghu. Although he approves of her choice, he cautions her about the difference in their social classes.

Raghu is invited to a party at a luxurious hotel with a restaurant, where Malu arrives with her aunt and uncle. Malu complains about the party, and is concerned about Raghu's presence. To test his honesty, Malu makes a sex-worker appointment with him at the hotel. Raghu goes there with Balu and Ramu, and Malu breaks up with him. He quits his job and returns to Tanjore, where his mother lives. Ramu fails to convince Malu that Raghu is honest. Balu is promoted and transferred to Bangalore with his wife, Sundari. He persuades Raghu come with him with a job with Malu's uncle, who came to see him to change his ideas. Malu sees Raghu, and tries vainly to rekindle their romance. Raghu falsely tells Balu that the page is turned between him and Malu; neither one can admit their love. Raghu is popular with the neighboring women, especially Meena (Balu's niece) and Rani, the daughter of a taxi owner. Raghu takes advantage of the love triangle.

== Cast ==
- Mohan as Raghunath (Raghu)
- Thengai Srinivasan as Balasubramaniam (Balu)
- Vennira Aadai Moorthy as the taxi owner
- Y. G. Mahendran as Ramu
- A. R. Srinivasan as Rajasekar
- Typist Gopu as Ramaiah
- Jayashree as Malathi (Malu)
- Gandhimathi as Sundari

== Production ==
Gaurishankar, who owned the Devi Theatre in Madras, formed the Devi Films production company and approached Sridhar to do a romantic comedy similar to Kadhalikka Neramillai (1964). Sridhar and Gopu discussed the script which became Thendrale Ennai Thodu at the Gandhi statue in Marina Beach. The film was announced in 1984 as Thendrale Ennai Thottu Vidu, and was Jayashree's film debut. A fight scene was filmed at Saradha Studios.

== Soundtrack ==
The music was composed by Ilaiyaraaja. "Kanmani Nee Vara Kaathirunthen" is set to the Carnatic raga Malayamarutam; "Kavithai Paadu" is set to Madhyamavati, "Pudhiya Poovithu Poothathu" is set to Suddha Dhanyasi, and "Thendral Vanthu Ennai Thodum" is set to Hamsanadam. Fifteen mandolins and four guitars were used to record "Pudhiya Poovithu Poothathu" in 1984 at Prasad Studios.

Track listing
No.	Title	Lyrics	Singer(s)	Length
1.	"Thendral Vanthu Ennai Thodum"	Vairamuthu	K. J. Yesudas, S. Janaki	04:16
2.	"Kanmani Nee Vara Kaathirunthen"	Vaali	K. J. Yesudas, Uma Ramanan	04:27
3.	"Pudhiya Poovithu Pooththathu"	Vaali	S. P. Balasubrahmanyam, S. Janaki	04:33
4.	"Ennanga Maappilla"	Vaali	S. Janaki	04:03
5.	"Kavithai Paadu"	Vaali	S. P. Balasubrahmanyam	04:23
6.	"Emmaa Anthi Mayakkamaa"	Vaali	Malaysia Vasudevan	03:57
Total length:				25:39

== Release and reception ==
Thendrale Ennai Thodu was released on 31 May 1985. A Kalki reviewer praised Ilaiyaraaja's music and Ashok Kumar's cinematography, but felt that the film lacked a storyline and asked Sridhar to come up with at least some plot in his next film.

== Bibliography ==
- Sundararaman (2007) [2005]. Raga Chintamani: A Guide to Carnatic Ragas Through Tamil Film Music (2nd ed.). Pichhamal Chintamani. OCLC 295034757.
