= Barbara Smith (actress) =

English actress (born 1997)

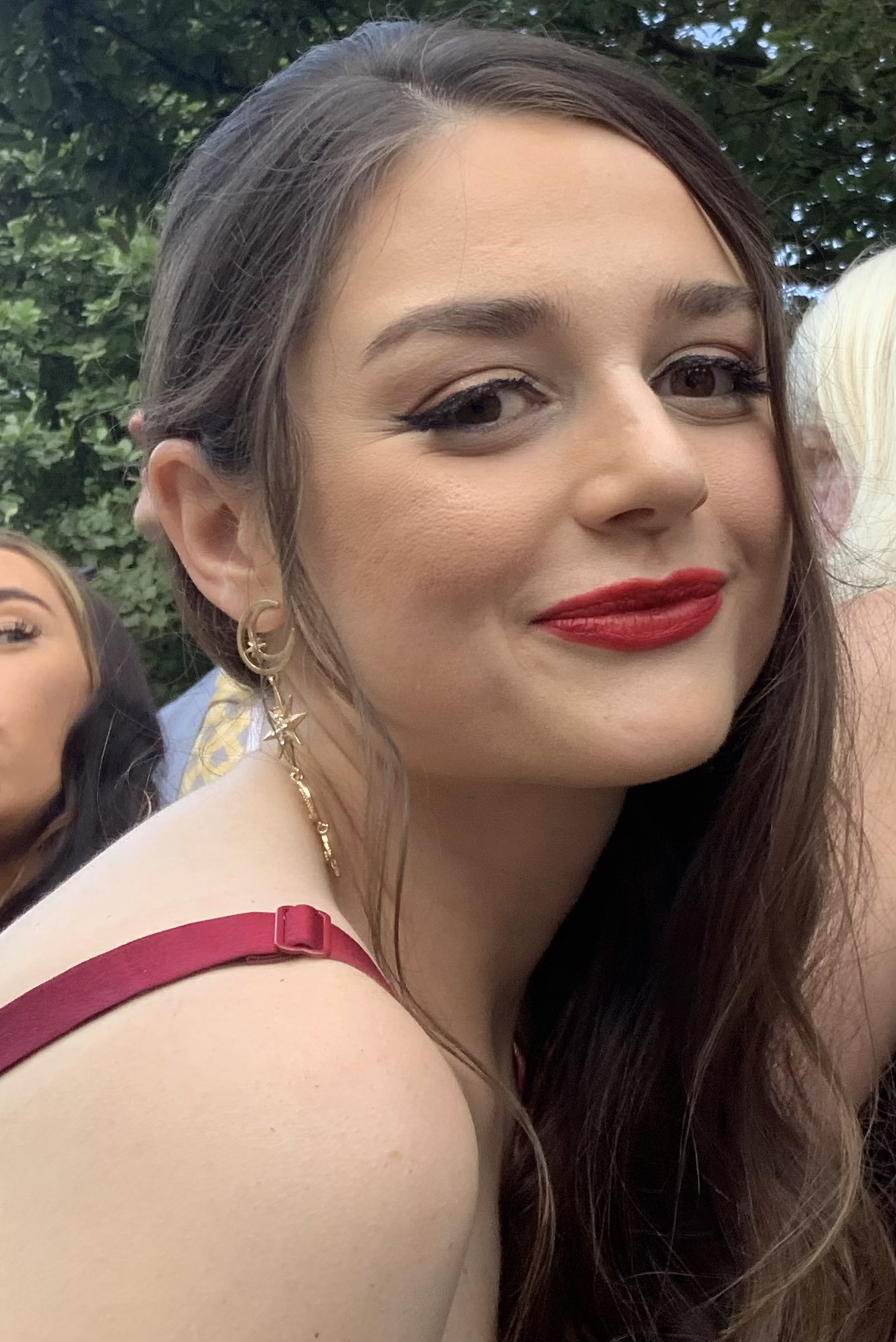
- Smith in 2022
- Born: Barbara Joan Smith; 22 July 1997 (age 28); Wandsworth, London, England
- Occupation: Actress
- Years active: 2010–present

Barbara Joan Smith (born 22 July 1997) is an English actress. After roles in Doctors, Call the Midwife and Casualty, she was cast as Dana Monroe in the BBC soap opera EastEnders. She appeared from in the programme from 2021 to 2022, since which she has appeared in The Twisted Tale of Amanda Knox.

== Life and career ==
Barbara Joan Smith was born in 1997 in Wandsworth, London. Her first acting credit was in the 2010 short film Devil's Redemption. After various other short film roles, her first television role was in 2017, when she portrayed Suki Stock in an episode of the BBC soap opera Doctors. Her character was involved in a storyline where she was found to be selling her mother's medication to fund her college course. In 2018, Smith appeared in an episode of BBC's Call the Midwife as Josie Winterlee. That same year, she featured in the 2018 action film I Am Vengeance, her first professional film credit.

In April 2019, Smith appeared in the BBC soap opera EastEnders as Ellie. A guest role, her character was a student at the University of Oxford who tells Bex Fowler (Jasmine Armfield) that she gets through her revision by taking ADHD medication. She then appeared in fellow BBC drama series Casualty as Kailey Clark. Later that year, she starred in White Girl as Beth, which was nominated for Best Short film at the BFI London Film Festival. She also had her first professional stage role as the leading role in Dear Elizabeth at the Gate Theatre. Then in 2020, Smith returned to theatre, this time in Unburied at the Bunker Theatre.

In 2021, Smith returned to EastEnders, this time in the role of Dana Monroe. Her casting was announced in March 2021, when it was confirmed that she would be joining as a love interest for established character Bobby Beale (Clay Milner Russell). She was initially contracted in a recurring role on the soap, but was eventually promoted to a regular cast member. The soap also introduced a family for Smith's character, casting Ross Boatman as father Harvey and Charlie Wernham as brother Aaron. Shortly after her introduction, Smith was nominated in the newcomer categories at both the I Talk Telly Awards and the Digital Spy Reader Awards for her portrayal of Dana. A scene of Bobby stopping Dana from leaving Walford was also nominated for Feel Good Moment at the 2021 Inside Soap Awards. She remained on EastEnders until 2022. Following her exit, she has appeared in the film Members Club in 2024 and in a recurring role on the Hulu series The Twisted Tale of Amanda Knox.

== Filmography ==
Year	Title	Role	Notes
2010	Devil's Redemption	Deborah Evans	Short film
2015	The Question	Elise	Short film
2016	Snip at the Rose	Blanche	Short film
2016	Bulldogs	Pippa	Short film
2017	Doctors	Suki Stock	Episode: "Box of Delights"
2018	Call the Midwife	Josie Winterlee	Guest role
2018	I Am Vengeance	Violet	Film
2019	EastEnders	Ellie	Guest role
2019	Casualty	Kailey Clark	Guest role
2019	White Girl	Beth	Short film
2021–2022	EastEnders	Dana Monroe	Regular role
2024	Members Club	Daisy	Film
2025	The Twisted Tale of Amanda Knox	Amy Frost	Recurring role

== Stage ==
Year	Title	Role	Venue
2019	Dear Elizabeth	Elizabeth Bishop	Gate Theatre
2020	Unburied	Nadia / Vlad	The Bunker

== Awards and nominations ==
Year	Award	Category	Nominated work	Result	Ref.
2021	I Talk Telly Awards	Best Soap Newcomer	EastEnders	Nominated	
2021	Digital Spy Reader Awards	Best Soap Newcomer	EastEnders	Third	
