= Love's Young Dream =

Phrase describing young love

"Love's Young Dream"

Oh! the days are gone, when Beauty bright
My heart's chain wove;
When my dream of life, from morn till night,
Was love, still love.
New hope may bloom,
And days may come,
Of milder calmer beam,
But there's nothing half so sweet in life
As love's young dream:
No, there's nothing half so sweet in life
As love's young dream.

Though the bard to purer fame may soar,
When wild youth's past;
Though he win the wise, who frown'd before,
To smile at last;
He'll never meet
A joy so sweet,
In all his noon of fame,
As when first he sung to woman's ear
His soul-felt flame,
And, at every close, she blush'd to hear
The one loved name.

No, — that hallow'd form is ne'er forgot
Which first love traced;
Still it lingering haunts the greenest spot
On memory's waste.
'Twas odour fled
As soon as shed;
'Twas morning's winged dream;
'Twas a light, tht ne'er can shine again
On life's dull stream:
Oh! 'twas light that n'er can shine again
On life's dull stream.

— Thomas Moore

Love's Young Dream is a phrase used to describe the early stages of romantic love between two young people. The term is often used in literature, music, films, TV, and other media.

== Origin ==
The phrase comes from lyrics written by Thomas Moore to accompany a series of Irish tunes arranged for piano by John Stevenson, forming the popular collection titled Irish Melodies, published between 1808 and 1835. His poem "Love's Young Dream" celebrates the bittersweet memories of youthful love, and contains the lines,

But there's nothing half so sweet in life
As love's young dream:
No, there's nothing half so sweet in life
As love's young dream.

== Examples ==
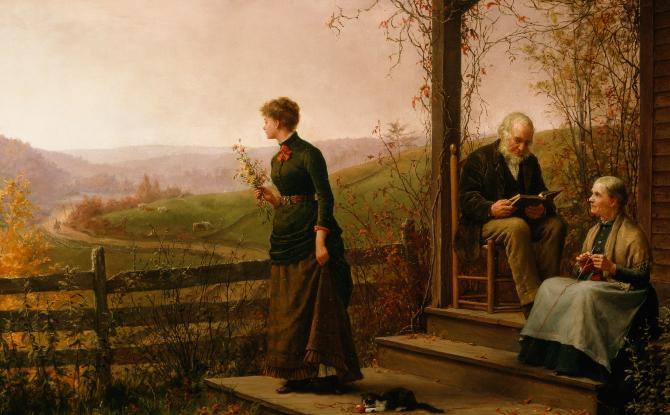
Jennie Augusta Brownscombe, Love's Young Dream (1887), National Museum of Women in the Arts

Examples of the phrase's use include:

=== Written works ===
- Kitty Crump: a Romance of "Love's Young Dream :" and Other Poems (1871), collection of poems by Frederick Langbridge
- Love's Young Dream (1877), novel by Frances Eliza Millett Notley
- Love's Young Dream (c. 1902), novel by Laura Jean Libbey
- Love's Young Dream (1910), novel by Samuel Rutherford Crockett
- Love's Young Dream (1914), novel by Effie Adelaide Rowlands
- "Love's Young Dream" (1989), poem in the collection Shadows of Dreams by Robert E. Howard

=== Plays ===
- Love's Young Dream – A Domestic Drama in One Act (1882), by Anonymous
- Love's Young Dream (1916), by Radcliffe Martin
- Love's Young Dream (1918), by Eva Elwes

=== Films ===
- "Love's Young Dream", chapter in The Mark of the Lash (1911)
- Mr. Jarr and Love's Young Dream (1915, short), starring Harry Davenport
- Love's Young Dream (1925), starring Lawrence B. McGill
- "Love's Young Dream", sung by Shirley Temple in The Little Colonel (1935)

=== TV ===
- "Love's Young Dream" (1960), episode of Have Gun – Will Travel
- "Love's Young Dream" (1987), episode of Me and My Girl
- "Love's Young Dream" (2018), episode of 24 Hours in A&E

=== Music ===
- "Love's Young Dream Waltz" (Knight), from the 1866 collection Favorite Waltzes Made Easy
- "Love's Young Dream" (1961), B-side of a single by Johnny Nash
- "Love's Young Dream", from the albums Merseybeast (1996) and Boots (2003) by Ian McNabb
- "Love's Young Dream", from the album Sleep Has His House (2000) by Current 93
- "Love's Young Dream", from the album The Deep Blue (2007) by Charlotte Hatherley

=== Paintings ===
- Love's Young Dream (c. 1857), by William Henry Kearney
- Love's Young Dream (c. 1860-1869), by John Burr
- Love's Young Dream (1883), by Henrietta Rae
- Love's Young Dream (1887), by Jennie Augusta Brownscombe

=== Journalism ===
- "Kit Harington and Rose Leslie look like love’s young dream in unearthed pictures"
- "Katy Perry & Orlando Bloom Look Like Love’s Young Dream In Previously Unseen Photos"
