= Clay Milner Russell =

English actor (born 1999)

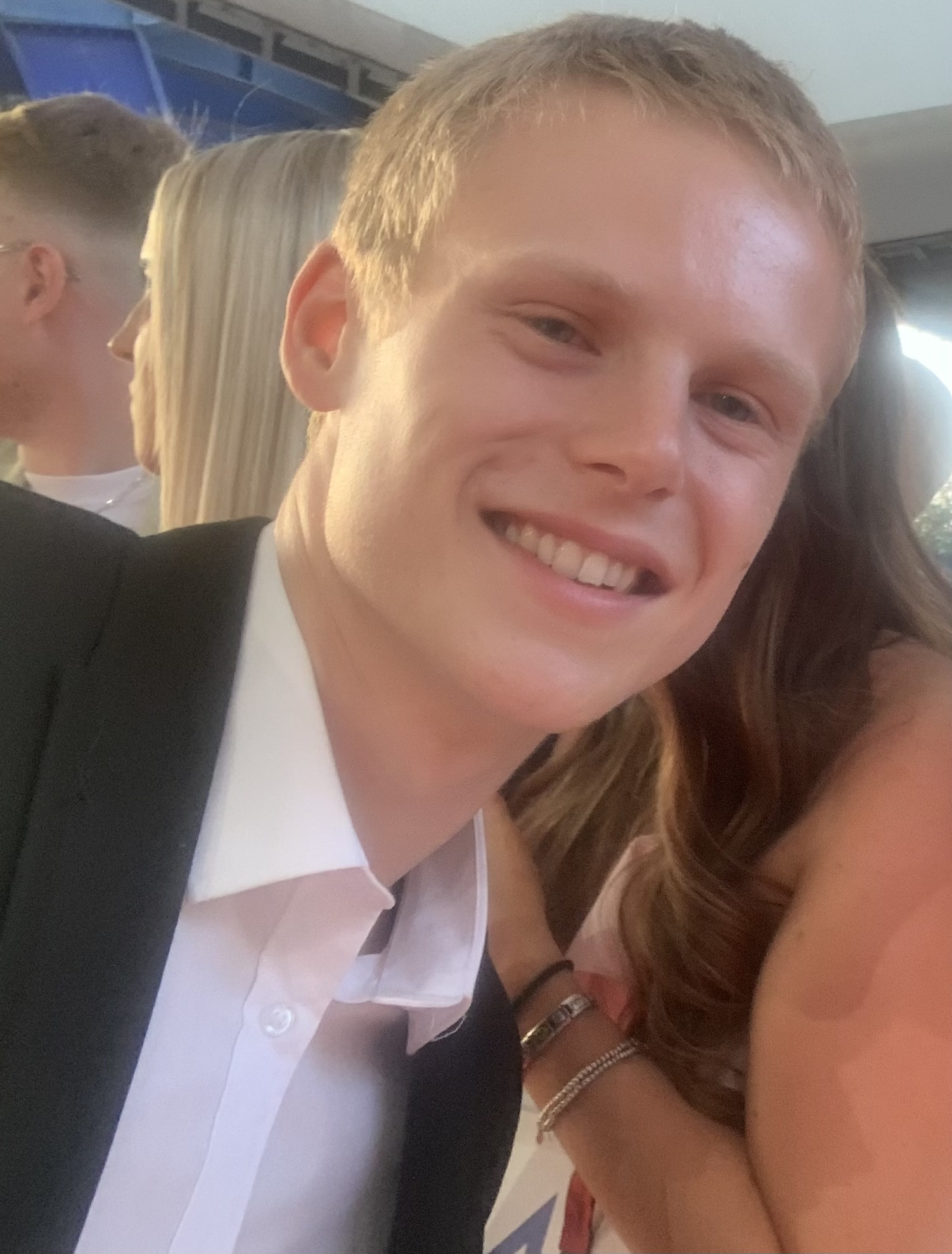
- Milner Russell in 2023
- Born: Clay Milner Russell; 25 July 1999 (age 26); Tower Hamlets, London, England
- Occupation: Actor
- Years active: 2013–present
- Television: EastEnders

Clay Milner Russell (born 25 July 1999) is an English actor, known for playing Bobby Beale on the BBC soap opera EastEnders from 2019 to 2024.

== Life and career ==
Clay Milner Russell was born on 25 July 1999 in Tower Hamlets, London, England. He began his acting career in 2013 when he appeared in the short film The Parachutist. In 2016, he starred in the short film Graffiti as Archie, a boy who is struggling to deal with the loss of his father and uses graffiti to reconnect with his mother. In 2019, Russell appeared in the film County Lines as Bailey.

In June 2019, Russell was announced to be joining the cast of the BBC soap opera EastEnders as the fifth actor to take on the role of Bobby Beale. His first scenes aired on 13 June 2019 when the character is released from prison following the murder of his sister, Lucy Beale (Hetti Bywater). Some of his key storylines as Bobby have included the character converting to Islam and subsequently becoming the victim of a racial attack, suffering from OCD, his infatuation with Dotty Cotton (Milly Zero), his relationships with Dana Monroe (Barbara Smith) and Anna Knight (Molly Rainford), and his friendship with Freddie Slater (Bobby Brazier). For his portrayal of Bobby, Russell was nominated for Best Newcomer at the Inside Soap Awards in 2020. In April 2024, it was reported that Russell would be leaving EastEnders after five years in the role.

== Filmography ==
Year	Title	Role	Notes	Ref.
2013	The Parachutist	Unknown	Short film	
2016	Graffiti	Archie	Short film	
2019	County Lines	Bailey	Film role	
2019–2024	EastEnders	Bobby Beale	Regular role	
2025	Hamnet	Laertes	Film role	
TBA	Bare	TBA	Filming	

== Awards and nominations ==
Year	Award	Category	Work	Result	Ref.
2020	Inside Soap Awards	Best Newcomer	EastEnders	Nominated	
