= Jon Sen =

British film director

- Born: 9 October 1978 (age 48); Bradford, West Yorkshire, England
- Occupations: Writer; director; producer
- Years active: 2000–present

Jon Sen (born 9 October 1978) is a British television and film director, writer and producer. After working as the executive producer of the BBC soap opera EastEnders from 2019 to 2022, Sen began working as the executive producer of the BBC medical drama series Casualty in 2022.

== Career ==
In 2000, Sen was awarded his first BBC drama commission to write and direct The Love Doctor. His second low budget television film, a short called Reignited was made for Channel 4's Coming Up strand and met with critical success. In 2003, Catherine Wearing employed Sen to direct Channel 4's £2 million flagship drama Second Generation starring Parminder Nagra. Despite being a ratings flop, the drama was critically acclaimed. Nagra won an EMMA for her lead performance and the programme was named in the Observer's top ten television of 2003. Sen continued to direct other dramas including Frances Tuesday starring Tamzin Outhwaite. Frances Tuesday was a success for ITV when it became the highest rated single drama of 2004 and went on to sell in over 43 countries worldwide. In May 2006, Sen completed Stan for BBC Four about the final meeting between Stan Laurel and Oliver Hardy, starring Jim Norton.

As a writer, his work includes 4 April 1968, a radio play about the assassination of Martin Luther King Jr., an adaptation of the Thomas Hardy novel Two on a Tower, Vanunu: A Time To Be Heard, a drama about nuclear whistle-blower Mordechai Vanunu, and The Man Who Wore Sanitary Pads about the Indian social entrepreneur, Arunachalam Muruganantham. The play was nominated for a BBC Audio Drama Award in the Best Scripted Comedy Drama category. Sen is an occasional contributor to newspapers and magazines, including The Independent and The Times of India.

On 10 December 2018, Sen was announced as the new executive producer of the BBC soap opera EastEnders. Sen's first credited episode as executive producer on EastEnders is episode 5954, originally broadcast on 15 July 2019. In November 2021, Sen stepped down as executive producer of EastEnders to lead the fellow BBC continuing drama Casualty. His final credited episode as executive producer of EastEnders aired on 10 March 2022. During his tenure, he received a mixed response from critics for his decisions on the show. He received a positive reception for his storylines involving the Carter and Panesar families, as well as reintroducing historical cast member Charlie Brooks as Janine Butcher. However, he was criticised for various decisions including killing off characters seen as key to the show’s future such as Dennis Rickman Jr, mishandling Chantelle Atkins' (Jess Plummer) abuse storyline by having her abuser Gray Atkins become a serial killer, making long-time character Sharon Watts try to poison her oldest friend-turned husband Ian Beale, breaking up Linda and Mick Carter’s long-term marriage by having Linda start an affair with long-time resident Max Branning, and a lack of aftermath within storylines and introducing incidental music that viewers found to be "jarring".

Media offices
| Preceded by Kate Oates | Executive Producer of EastEnders; 15 July 2019 – 10 March 2022 | Succeeded by Chris Clenshaw |
