= List of EastEnders characters introduced in 2020 =

EastEnders logo

EastEnders is a BBC soap opera that first aired on 19 February 1985. The following is a list of characters that first appeared in 2020, in order of first appearance. All characters are introduced by the show's executive producer, Jon Sen. The first character to be introduced in 2020 is the son of Sheree Trueman (Suzette Llewellyn), Isaac Baptiste (Stevie Basaula). The Panesar family matriarch Suki Panesar (Balvinder Sopal) is then introduced in January. Laura Awoyinka (Sarah Paul), a colleague of Gray Atkins (Toby-Alexander Smith), is introduced in March. Frankie Lewis (Rose Ayling-Ellis), a deaf character who befriends Ben Mitchell (Max Bowden), is introduced in May. Ellie Nixon (Mica Paris) joins the soap in September. Two months later, Katy Lewis (Simone Lahbib), the mother of Frankie, first appears. One month later, Mila Marwa (Ruhtxjiaïh Bèllènéa) is introduced as a rival, then friend, for Kim Fox. Additionally, multiple other characters were featured during the year.

== Isaac Baptiste ==
Isaac Baptiste
- EastEnders character
- Portrayed by: Stevie Basaula
- Duration: 2020–2022
- First appearance: Episode 6053/6054; 1 January 2020
- Last appearance: Episode 6461; 31 March 2022
- Introduced by: Jon Sen
In-universe information
- Occupation: Teacher
- Father: Patrick Trueman
- Mother: Sheree Trueman
- Stepfather: Eamonn
- Half-brothers: Anthony Trueman
- Grandmothers: Wanda Baptiste
- Nephews: Josh Goodwin; Euan Trueman
- Nieces: Jasmine Fisher

Isaac Baptiste, played by Stevie Basaula, first appears in episode 6053/6054, originally broadcast on 1 January 2020. The character had not been announced prior to his first appearance and Basaula's casting details were announced following broadcast. Isaac is introduced as the son of established character Sheree Trueman (Suzette Llewellyn). The character is billed as a "fiercely confident" and "bold" teacher who "won't be afraid to leave his mark on the soap". Jon Sen, the show's executive producer, described Isaac as someone arriving with "bravado, charisma and his fair share of charm". Basaula expressed his excitement to join the soap and create the character of Isaac. It was confirmed in February 2022 that Basaula quit his role and he departed on 31 March 2022.

Since Sheree's introduction in August 2019, it was established that she had a secret, which was revealed to be Isaac in his first episode, an episode set on Christmas Day 2019. Sen dubbed Isaac "the 'other man' in Sheree's life". He added that Isaac has a "troubled past" which would be explored as the reason behind Sheree keeping Isaac a secret from her husband, Patrick Trueman (Rudolph Walker), becomes clear. Later episodes confirmed that Isaac is Patrick's biological son after Patrick realises the truth and questions Sheree. Isaac is first seen on New Year's Day 2020, on a bench in Albert Square.

== Suki Panesar ==
Suki Panesar, played by Balvinder Sopal, first appears in episode 6069, originally broadcast on 27 January 2020. The character was mentioned on-screen before her introduction, but further details about the character and Sopal's casting details were announced on 22 December 2019. Suki is introduced as the mother of Kheerat (Jaz Deol), Jags (Amar Adatia), Vinny (Shiv Jalota) and Ash (Gurlaine Kaur Garcha). The character was billed as the "fiercely protective" and "larger than life" matriarch of the established Panesar family who "always knows best" and is "not one to be reckoned with". Sopal expressed her delight at joining the soap and deemed the role "a dream come true". Jon Sen, the show's executive producer, said that Sopal brings "a unique blend of steeliness and charm" to the role.

Her initial storyline sees her lying about having cancer to garner sympathy and get closer to her children. She was immediately well-received by viewers and critics, with Inside Soap writing that Suki had reached "soap icon status in record time". Over her tenure, Suki was developed from a full-on villain into a character with vulnerability alongside her mischief. This begins with Suki being affected by racial abuse graffitied over her shop due to believing she had become ingrained into Walford. Suki then frames her son, Jags, for a crime and gets him self to prison, where he is killed. The story explores Suki's guilt over what she has done and Honey Mitchell (Emma Barton) becomes a key support for Suki. She tries to kiss Honey and it transpires that Suki has an attraction to women, which Sopal said explains Suki's treatment of Ash. Her various feuds have also been a focal point for the character, with Suki's rivalries including the entire Mitchell and Slater family units.

Suki is later given a long-term love interest in Eve Unwin (Heather Peace), who she has a secret affair with. The on-off relationship has been told through a 'slow burn' approach to respect the reality of both the LGBTQ+ and the Southeast Asian communities. Writers then introduced Suki's abusive husband, Nish (Navin Chowdhry), who is released from prison after he murdered Suki's friend. The storyline sees Suki coercively controlled by Nish, and despite not being scared of him, she is worried about what he could do throughout the storyline. Suki and Eve's relationship, dubbed 'Sukeve', has also been well-received by the LGBTQ+ community, with Diva magazine praising the representation it depicted.

== Albie Watts ==
Albie Watts
- EastEnders character
- Portrayed by: Various (2020); Arthur Gentleman (2020–present)
- Duration: 2020–present
- First appearance: Episode 6089; 21 February 2020
- Introduced by: Jon Sen
In-universe information
- Other names: Kayden Watts
- Family: Mitchell/Watts
- Father: Phil Mitchell
- Mother: Sharon Watts
- Adoptive father: Keanu Taylor (legal)
- Stepfather: Ian Beale
- Stepmother: Kat Slater
- Half-brothers: Ben Mitchell; Dennis Rickman Jnr; Raymond Fox
- Half-sisters: Louise Mitchell
- Grandfathers: Eric Mitchell; Gavin Sullivan; Den Watts (adoptive)
- Grandmothers: Peggy Mitchell; Carol Hanley; Angie Watts (adoptive)
- Uncles: Grant Mitchell; Zack Hudson; Kristopher Hanley; Jonathan Hanley
- Aunts: Sam Mitchell; Vicki Fowler (adoptive)
- Nieces: Lexi Pearce; Peggy Taylor; Alyssa Lennox
- First cousins: Mark Fowler Jnr; Courtney Mitchell; Ricky Branning; Barney Mitchell; Dolly Dean-Hudson
- Other relatives: Aunt Sal; Archie Mitchell; Clive Mitchell; Stevie Mitchell; Billy Mitchell; Teddy Mitchell; Harry Mitchell; Jamie Mitchell; Will Mitchell; Janet Mitchell; Lola Pearce; Ronnie Mitchell; Roxy Mitchell; Danielle Jones; James Branning; Matthew Mitchell Cotton; Amy Mitchell

Albie Watts (also Kayden Watts) is the son of established characters Sharon Watts (Letitia Dean) and Phil Mitchell (Steve McFadden). It was initially thought for the first three and a half years of his life that his father was Keanu Taylor (Danny Walters) as a result of his year-long affair with Sharon. Albie is born at the local funeral parlour in the episode broadcast on 21 February 2020, as part of the programme's 35th anniversary celebrations, after being delivered by Kathy Beale (Gillian Taylforth). Sharon's other son, Dennis Rickman Jnr (Bleu Landau), dies in a boat crash on the River Thames simultaneously as Albie is born, so Sharon struggles to care for Albie as she is grieving for Dennis. Keanu leaves shortly after Albie is born, after being threatened by Phil and told to "get out" by Sharon. Sharon does not initially name her son, so Keanu's mother, Karen Taylor (Lorraine Stanley), names him Kayden. Sharon later renames him Albie during the COVID-19 lockdown.

Keanu returns to Walford in December 2022, determined to build a relationship with his son, which Sharon allows. Sharon is offered the chance to work in Abu Dhabi for a year resulting in Keanu, who has no legal access to Albie as he is not on the birth certificate, kidnapping Albie in a bid to stop Sharon taking him out the country. Albie is returned a week later via Karen who says that he was left alone in the park, and the police insist he be given the once over at hospital. Sharon and Keanu are called to the hospital where they are told that Albie has AATD, a rare genetic condition that can affect the liver and lungs in later life which can only be inherited if both parents have the condition or the gene. After undergoing blood tests to find out if they have either the condition or the gene, the doctor confirms that Sharon has the gene but Keanu does not, meaning that he cannot be Albie's father. It is at that moment Sharon realises her ex-husband Phil is the father. Keanu is later killed by Linda Carter (Kellie Bright) in The Six storyline, when he attacks and strangles Sharon after finding out Albie wasn't his son.

== Laura Awoyinka ==
Laura Awoyinka
- EastEnders character
- Portrayed by: Sarah Paul
- Duration: 2020–2022
- First appearance: Episode 6090; 5 March 2020
- Last appearance: Episode 6449; 10 March 2022
- Introduced by: Jon Sen
In-universe information
- Occupation: Solicitor

Laura Awoyinka, played by Sarah Paul, first appears in episode 6090, originally broadcast on 5 March 2020.

Laura is a partner at the law firm that Gray Atkins (Toby-Alexander Smith) works for. When Gray decides he wants to drop Kush Kazemi's (Davood Ghadami) grievous bodily harm charge and Whitney Dean's (Shona McGarty) murder charge due to stress, Laura encourages him to continue with the cases. She also asks Gray to persuade Kush to change his plea to guilty and reminds him that she has defended him to other partners at the firm before. Laura visits Gray at his home to congratulate him on the result of Kush's case and to wish him luck for Whitney's bail hearing. She tells him that Whitney needs to receive bail and warns him that Sophie Rundell (Suzanne Ahmet) will be the prosecution solicitor at the hearing. Gray loses the bail hearing, so Laura visits him at his home to warn him that he will be formally suspended during the following week, devastating him. When the law firm drops Whitney's case, Gray decides to take it on. He meets with Laura at his home to inform her about the progress of it, asking for his job back if he wins the case. Laura reminds him that even if he wins, the law firm has to consider his judgement of Leo King (Tom Wells), the solicitor Gray employed at the firm while he was stalking Whitney. Laura later bumps into Gray and his family in the street, where she states that she is looking forward to their meeting with Whitney, who has gone missing. When she arrives for the meeting, she instead meets some of Whitney's friends and family, who offer to be character witnesses. However, Laura wants to see Whitney instead, so they claim that she is unwell. Laura and Gray later meet to discuss Whitney's trial; Laura wants to remove Gray from the case as his wife, Chantelle Atkins (Jessica Plummer), has recently died, but Gray wants to continue regardless. During the trial, Whitney's solicitor becomes ill, so Laura tries to persuade Judge Adams (Karlina Grace-Paseda) to postpone the closing statements to the following day; the judge refuses, so Laura informs Whitney and her aunt, Sonia Fowler (Natalie Cassidy), that they will need to get a solicitor from the firm to stand in. Whitney suggests that Gray do it. When Gray arrives, Laura and Sonia agree that Gray is not suitable for the job, but point out that they have to trust Whitney's decision. Following a not guilty verdict for Whitney, Laura congratulates Gray on his work and offers him his job back; he informs her that he is not returning to work, which surprises Laura. Laura later sees Gray with Whitney at a gala event, and, believing them to be a couple, expresses surprise that Gray has moved on so quickly after Chantelle's death. Gray lies that they are indeed a couple, insisting that love has no timetable. A few months after this, Gray attends a colleague's birthday party, now accompanied by Chelsea Fox (Zaraah Abrahams) when he encounters Laura again. After making the most of the free bar, Gray vents that he thinks Laura has a vendetta against him since she won't give him a promotion or any complex cases at work. When Chelsea takes a drunken Gray home, Laura comes round and warns Chelsea to get away from him while she can, as Gray will try to break her down and remodel her in his image as he did with Chantelle. Gray is later seen sending Laura a message on her Twitter account, under the pseudonym Jasper, that says: "People like you always get what's coming". She later sacks him. In December 2021, she returns again and threatens Gray, who is bad-mouthing her to her clients so that they come to him instead. She later warns Whitney about his behaviour and tells her to get him away from Chelsea as quickly as possible.

Viewers predicted that Laura would become Gray's fourth murder victim after Chantelle Atkins (Jessica Plummer), Tina Carter (Luisa Bradshaw-White) and Kush Kazemi (Davood Ghadami).

== Frankie Lewis ==
Frankie Lewis
- EastEnders character
- Portrayed by: Rose Ayling-Ellis
- Duration: 2020–2022
- First appearance: Episode 6115; 18 May 2020
- Last appearance: Episode 6560; 22 September 2022
- Introduced by: Jon Sen
In-universe information
- Other names: Frankie Carter
- Occupation: Barmaid; Photographer; Teaching assistant
- Father: Mick Carter
- Mother: Katy Lewis
- Stepmother: Linda Carter; Janine Butcher
- Half-brothers: Harry Lewis; Lee Carter; Johnny Carter; Ollie Carter
- Half-sisters: Nancy Carter
- Grandfathers: Buster Briggs
- Grandmothers: Shirley Carter
- Uncles: Dean Wicks; Jimbo Wicks
- Aunts: Carly Wicks
- Nephews: Michael Carter
- Other relatives: Stan Carter; Sylvie Carter; Babe Smith; Tina Carter; Zsa Zsa Carter

Frankie Carter (also Lewis), played by Rose Ayling-Ellis, first appears in episode 6115, originally broadcast on 18 May 2020. The character and Ayling-Ellis' casting details were announced on 23 February 2020. Frankie is introduced as a new friend for Ben Mitchell (Max Bowden), introduced to him by his boyfriend Callum Highway (Tony Clay) after Ben is diagnosed with hearing loss following a boat crash. The character, like Ayling-Ellis, is deaf and was created to raise awareness for deaf people in Britain. She is portrayed as a positive, upbeat person who "embraces the deaf community". Ayling-Ellis was contracted for a guest stint and Frankie appears in a "handful of episodes". The character and story were created by Charlie Swinbourne, a member of the soap's writing team, who pitched the story to his colleagues. Jon Sen, the show's executive producer, expressed his delight at working with Ayling-Ellis and exploring the deaf community in the new story. Ayling-Ellis expressed her excitement at joining the cast and being the first deaf actress on EastEnders. Bowden looked forward to portraying the story and called Ayling-Ellis "epic".

As a deaf person himself, Swinbourne was proud to create the soap's first regular deaf character. He added that he had wanted to see more representation of deafness in the media and looked forward to featuring "deaf characters and sign language" in Albert Square, the show's fictional setting. The use of sign language in scenes marks the first time it has featured in EastEnders. EastEnders worked with the National Deaf Children's Society (NDCS), disability charity Sense and other experts to portray Frankie and Ben's story accurately. Rosie Eggleston, the leader of the NDCS' work with young people, hoped that Frankie and Ben's story would help more young deaf people be visible and understood. She also liked working with the EastEnders research team when developing the story. Richard Kramer, the chief executive of Sense, agreed with Swinbourne that there was not enough disability representation in the media, so was pleased to learn EastEnders were featuring a story on hearing loss and introducing a new deaf character. He also congratulated Ayling-Ellis on becoming the first deaf actress to join the soap.

A behind-the-scenes video, released in August 2020, confirmed that Frankie would return following the show's three-month transmission break. Upon her return, the character becomes involved with the Carter family and accepts a job at The Prince Albert bar. Producers incorporated Frankie in an issue-led story with Mick Carter (Danny Dyer) after it emerges that she is Mick's daughter after he was abused, aged twelve, by Frankie's mother, Katy Lewis (Simone Lahbib), who was Mick's social worker during his time in care. EastEnders worked with charities, the NSPCC and SurvivorsUK, to accurately portray the story.

In August 2022, it was announced that Ayling-Ellis had quit her role as Frankie to seek other opportunities. She had already filmed her final scenes. Prior to her exit, writers used the character to explore the safety of women on the streets. Ayling-Ellis called the story "a really important one that will hit home for lots of people". The actress spoke proudly about her time on the soap and portraying its first deaf character. The show's executive producer, Chris Clenshaw, described Ayling-Ellis as "an incredible asset to EastEnders" and "a real trailblazer". Frankie's departure features in episode 6561, first broadcast on 22 September 2022, as she leaves for a job opportunity in Scotland. For this episode alone, she is credited as "Frankie Carter", reflecting one of her final scenes in which she tells Mick that she is changing her name.

Frankie is spotted by Callum Highway as she argues with Dr Laghari (Ezra Faroque Khan), her doctor. Callum later sees Frankie in Walford and asks her to talk to Ben about life as a deaf person; Ben initially rejects Frankie, but they soon form a friendship. Ben's mother, Kathy Beale (Gillian Taylforth), offers Frankie a trial shift as a bartender at her gay bar, The Prince Albert, unaware that the manager, Tina Carter (Luisa Bradshaw-White), has offered the job to her nephew, Mick. Mick withdraws from the job, so that Frankie can have it, resulting in tension between Frankie and Tina. Despite this, they soon bond and Frankie meets Mick's son, Ollie Carter (Harry Farr), who has autism; she reveals that her dead brother Harry was autistic and looked similar to Ollie. Frankie takes photos of Mick, Ollie and Tina playing football, which Mick finds on her camera. Tina tries to kiss Frankie, but she rejects her. When Mick's wife, Linda Carter (Kellie Bright), struggles with childcare for Ollie, Frankie offers to take him to the park; when Mick discovers this, he rushes to collect Ollie and warns Frankie away from his family. Frankie then reveals that she believes that Mick is her father and explains that she discovered letters between Mick and her mother, Katy; Mick admits that he could be her father. Worried that this could cause Linda to relapse into alcoholism, Mick asks Frankie to not reveal the news. Frankie accuses Mick of repeatedly cheating on Linda, who he began a relationship with as a teenager, but Tina reveals that Katy was Mick's social worker when they were children, horrifying Frankie, who realises that Mick was twelve when she was conceived, prompting her to run off in disgust.

Frankie later engages in a feud with her half-sister, Nancy Carter (Maddy Hill), in 2021, after she returns from Australia. Frankie and Zack Hudson (James Farrar) accidentally run Nancy over with a car whilst on a driving lesson and cover it up. This culminates with them pranking each other and throwing insults and on Bonfire Night 2021, one prank goes wrong, with Nancy locking Frankie in the boot of her car and Liam Butcher (Alfie Deegan) stealing and driving off in it, with Frankie still in the boot.

== Ellie Nixon ==
Ellie Nixon
- EastEnders character
- Portrayed by: Mica Paris
- First appearance: Episode 6136; 25 September 2020
- Last appearance: Episode 6153; 26 October 2020
- Introduced by: Jon Sen
In-universe information
- Sons: Jonah Dawkins
- Grandsons: Raymond Dawkins (adoptive)

Ellie Nixon, played by Mica Paris, first appears in episode 6136, originally broadcast on 25 September 2020. The character and Paris' casting details were announced on 20 August 2020, and she is introduced following the soap's three-month transmission break. Ellie is introduced as part of a story exploring Denise Fox's (Diane Parish) history. Jon Sen, the show's executive producer, was looking forward to the story and noted that it "really excites". The character is billed as "a wolf in sheep's clothing, with far more to her than her warmhearted façade lets on". Paris called Ellie a "hardcore" and "formidable" villain who could rival other villainous characters. The role marks the first time Paris has portrayed a villain. Ellie will use "her prowess for playing roles in order to get what she wants". Sen dubbed the character "tough [and] no-nonsense" and "a ruthless and uncompromising force of nature". Paris expressed her delight at joining the cast, opining that it marked a "a new frontier" for her acting career. Appearing on BBC Radio 1Xtra, the actress stated that she and Ellie have very different personalities and upon seeing her early performances, she was "terrified". Sen explained that the role of Ellie required an actress with "both charisma and presence", so he decided to invite Paris for the role.

Upon the character's introduction, she is revealed to be the adoptive grandmother of Raymond Dawkins, the biological son of Denise and Phil Mitchell (Steve McFadden). Raymond's family, including Ellie's son, are killed in a car accident; Denise and Ellie meet at the hospital where Raymond is being treated, but Denise does not reveal her identity. To portray the scenes with "sentiment", Paris recalled her own experiences from the death of her brother, who was shot eighteen years previously. She also found that she became "swept up into the vortex of the story" due to its power. The actress added that Ellie is so "overwhelmed" in the aftermath of the accident, but realises that something is "not quite right with Denise". Despite this, she is thankful for Denise's presence as she is Ellie's main support. Paris noted that Ellie does not want "there to be anything bad with Denise".

Ellie did not have a close relationship with her family, but suddenly has to "step up" as Raymond's next of kin. Paris explained that Ellie has "been thrown in at the deep end", which shocks her. The character's introduction sparks a custody battle between Ellie and Denise. Paris told Alison Slade of What's on TV that both women want Raymond "for [their] own reasons", leaving Raymond "stuck in the middle". She added that her fierce personality also intimidates Phil. The actress enjoyed working with Parish and McFadden and opined that they "helped to make it that easy" as they are "great talent[s]". Ellie's guest stint concludes in episode 6153, originally broadcast on 26 October 2020. The character's exit was not announced prior to broadcast. In the narrative, Ellie is blackmailed by Phil into signing guardianship of Raymond to him, before leaving.

Gary Gillatt from Inside Soap praised the character, writing, "Mica Paris has incredible presence as Ellie. We hope she's here for more than this one storyline."

== Katy Lewis ==
Katy Lewis
- EastEnders character
- Portrayed by: Simone Lahbib; Holly Maguire (flashback)
- Duration: 2020–2021
- First appearance: Episode 6160; 6 November 2020
- Last appearance: Episode 6276; 21 May 2021
- Introduced by: Jon Sen
In-universe information
- Occupation: Social worker
- Sons: Harry Lewis
- Daughters: Frankie Lewis

Katy Lewis, played by Simone Lahbib, first appears in episode 6160, originally broadcast on 6 November 2020. Some character details and Lahbib's casting were announced on 22 September 2020, but most details, including the character's name, were not publicised until 3 November 2020. The character is introduced as the mother of Frankie Lewis (Rose Ayling-Ellis) and former social worker of Mick Carter (Danny Dyer), who she sexually abused when he was a child. Through Katy's introduction, producers explored the issue of historical sexual abuse. EastEnders worked with charities, the NSPCC and SurvivorsUK, to accurately portray the story. Lahbib expressed her excitement at joining the cast and teased that Katy would have "a lasting impact on the Carters and will test their strength as a family". She was also excited to work with her former Bad Girls co-stars Kellie Bright (Linda Carter), Luisa Bradshaw-White (Tina Carter) and Linda Henry (Shirley Carter). Jon Sen, the show's executive producer, said that Katy's story is "important" with an "impact on the Carters set to be everlasting".

When the character arrives in Walford, she is introduced as the mother of Frankie Lewis (Rose Ayling-Ellis) and it is revealed that she used to work in a children's home, where Mick Carter (Danny Dyer) was a resident. Frankie points out to Mick that he was sexually abused when at the home. When Mick starts having flashbacks, Katy convinces him that the events that happened are not how he remembers them. When Linda Carter (Kellie Bright) has an affair, she convinces him that the marriage is not worth saving. When Mick contemplates suicide, during a phone call to The Samaritans, he realises that she did abuse him and rape him when he was 12 years old. Katy stands trial after pleading guilty and in spite of Frankie's positive character statement, she is sentenced to ten years imprisonment and is placed on the sex offenders register indefinitely. Before she is taken down, she apologises to Mick.

In an interview with Digital Spy, Lahbib stated that it has been "very interesting and challenging" to play a character like Katy, due to having portrayed "strong but vulnerable" characters in her acting career. She stated that Katy is "much more complex, damaged and dark" than her previous roles, and noted that previous characters she has played have been "emotional and from the heart", while Katy is "all from the head", "clever and quick thinking", and that she "grooms people, gains trust, extracts information, then uses it to manipulate them." She added that at the beginning of Katy's tenure, she wanted "the audience to be sucked in by her in the beginning", and to be confused in the ways that Mick was. Lahbib also confirmed that prior to playing Katy, she did research including speaking to survivors of sexual abuse, watching documentaries and reading books. Lahbib explained that she "didn't want to let Katy's mask slip too soon", explaining that "some viewers weren't sure if Katy was good or bad at the start", which is what she hoped for. She went on to say: "I wanted viewers to be drawn in by the way Katy charms people, so it was great to see that coming across. People were saying they hate Katy and that she's gaslighting Mick, which shows they understood what she was doing." On scenes that were filmed in the COVID-19 pandemic, she explained that Dyer asked producers if they could become a "bubble" so that they did not have to film two metres apart, the advised amount of space to prevent spreading coronavirus. She described filming those scenes as "exciting", and noted that it would have been "hard to do while staying two metres apart".

== Mila Marwa ==
Mila Marwa, portrayed by Ruhtxjiaïh Bèllènéa, made her first appearance on 15 December 2020 when she is introduced as a woman who competes with Kim Fox (Tameka Empson) for a job at the Prince Albert club. After the pair argue and drop a bottle of alcohol, Mila explains the mistake, and Kathy Beale (Gillian Taylforth) hires her due to her honesty. Mila's backstory was later explored in order to raise awareness of FGM. It was announced on 17 January 2022 that Bèllènéa had made the decision to leave the soap and her final scenes aired on 3 February 2022.

== Other characters ==
| Character | Episode date(s) | Actor | Circumstances |
|---|---|---|---|
| Head judge | 10 January | Joe Sutherland | The head judge at the Walford beauty pageant. He disqualifies Janet Mitchell (Grace) when she does not arrive for her performance, but audience members protest that he wait for her. He later names Janet the winner of the pageant. |
| PC Stevens | 10 January | Leo Ihenacho | Two police officers who stop Keegan Butcher-Baker (Zack Morris) and Vinny Panesar (Shiv Jalota) and search them for a stolen mobile phone, as they are on a moped and the phone was stolen by two men on a moped. Vinny accuses them of racism although Stevens says that as both men were wearing helmets, it has nothing to do with their ethnicity. Vinny tells Stevens he should be ashamed because he is also black. Keegan is calm and asks to see their identification and a copy of the report. |
| PC Adams | 10 January | Uncredited | Two police officers who stop Keegan Butcher-Baker (Zack Morris) and Vinny Panesar (Shiv Jalota) and search them for a stolen mobile phone, as they are on a moped and the phone was stolen by two men on a moped. Vinny accuses them of racism although Stevens says that as both men were wearing helmets, it has nothing to do with their ethnicity. Vinny tells Stevens he should be ashamed because he is also black. Keegan is calm and asks to see their identification and a copy of the report. |
| Sam | 10 January | Jon Tsouras | A man whom Ben Mitchell (Max Bowden) meets for casual sex after arranging it online. Sam wants to get to know Ben first, but Ben is not interested and leaves. |
| Receptionist | 13 January | Phillipa Flynn | A receptionist at a sexual health clinic where Linda Carter (Kellie Bright) and Mick Carter (Danny Dyer) visit. |
| Man | 14 January | Dan March | A friend of Jack Branning (Scott Maslen) who meets Callum Highway (Tony Clay) about his police interview. He leaves when Callum's former boyfriend, Ben Mitchell (Max Bowden), interrupts and insults him. |
| Punter | 14 January | Ediz Huseyin | A man who tries to negotiate the price of a smoothie mix that Leo King (Tom Wells) is selling. When Dotty Cotton (Milly Zero) flirts with him, the punter agrees to buy it. |
| Simon | 17 January | Paul Sloss | A man who meets Callum Highway (Tony Clay) for a date set up by Callum's brother, Stuart Highway (Ricky Champ) and Stuart's girlfriend, Rainie Branning (Tanya Franks). Simon realises that Callum still has feelings for a previous boyfriend and reassures him that he can leave the date, which Callum does. |
| "Ham Man" | 20–23 January (3 episodes) | George Fletcher | A man dressed up as a joint of ham who is running against Ian Beale (Adam Woodyatt) for the Walford council elections. He campaigns on the market. He and Ian both gain 575 votes in the election, but he loses to Ian when they draw straws to decide a winner. |
| Mr Hobbs | 20 January | David Corbett | The supplier of Whitney Dean's (Shona McGarty) clothing for her market stall. Whitney arranges for Mr Hobbs to see Kat Slater (Jessie Wallace) about a cleaning contract for her business. She pitches a contract to him and he agrees to give Kat the contract in exchange for sex. When he tries to kiss her, Kat threatens him and orders him to leave. |
| Returning officer | 23 January | James Dinsmore | The returning officer at the results of the Walford council elections, who announces that Ian Beale (Adam Woodyatt) and Ham Man (George Fletcher) have tied. He then makes the candidates draw straws and Ian wins. |
| Clive | 27 January | Uncredited | A customer of The Queen Victoria public house who Mick Carter (Danny Dyer) jokes with Tina Carter (Luisa Bradshaw-White) is gender fluid. |
| Mr Patel | 27–28 January (2 episodes) | Esh Alladi | A council housing department officer who visits 23a Albert Square to assess whether the legal tenant, Ted Murray (Christopher Timothy), is illegally subletting. The current resident, Tiffany Butcher-Baker (Maisie Smith), claims that she is Ted's wife and gets Ted's friend, Patrick Trueman (Rudolph Walker), to pose as Ted. Mr Patel asks Patrick and Tiffany some questions and asks for Patrick's identity documents, which he provides reasons for not having. Mr Patel then leaves, telling Tiffany that he will inform them of the results of his report. |
| Loretta Perkins | 28 January – 30 March (4 episodes) | Sarah Finigan | A social worker who interviews Mick Carter (Danny Dyer) and his son, Ollie Carter (Harry Farr), after a report is made by Ollie's school. She is pleased with their talk until Ollie's mother, Linda Carter (Kellie Bright), arrives drunk with bruises on her head and is rude to her, causing Loretta to believe that Mick is abusing Linda. She then explains her concerns to Mick and reminds him that she is here for Ollie's wellbeing; Mick then confesses that Linda is an alcoholic. Loretta returns for another meeting with Mick and Linda and asks Linda if she is receiving support for her alcoholism. When Mick asks Loretta about Ollie's progress, she informs him that Ollie appeared withdrawn and asks whether Linda's alcoholism has ever affected her capability as Ollie's guardian. Linda believes that Mick has criticised her to Loretta, so she finds Loretta in the local café and asks to have a conversation; Loretta explains that she cannot as she is running late for her next meeting. Linda later finds Loretta at Walford East restaurant on a break and believing that Mick has already told Loretta, Linda confesses that while caring for Ollie, she fell asleep and set off the smoke alarm, which caused Ollie to go to the roof of their public house, The Queen Victoria; she promises that he was not in danger, but Loretta is shocked. Loretta visits Mick and Linda again to check on Linda's progress with her alcoholism recovery and further her report on Ollie's welfare. She is pleased with Linda's progress and informs them that it will be reflected in her report. |
| DI Declan Briggs | 28 January | Logan Dean | A detective inspector interviewing Leo King (Tom Wells) after he is pushed from The Prince Albert gay bar balcony by Kush Kazemi (Davood Ghadami). DI Briggs then arrests Kush for grievous bodily harm. |
| Nurse | 30 January | Sami Larabi | A nurse who is attending to Leo King (Tom Wells) during his hospital stay. He speaks to Whitney Dean (Shona McGarty) about Leo after she claims to be his girlfriend. |
| PC Archer | 31 January | Charlie Allen | Two police officers who stop Keegan Butcher-Baker (Zack Morris) and ask to search him for knives. Keegan, who is regularly searched, believes they are searching him because of his race and refuses to cooperate, so they arrest him. |
| PC Murray | 31 January | Charlotte Bradford | Two police officers who stop Keegan Butcher-Baker (Zack Morris) and ask to search him for knives. Keegan, who is regularly searched, believes they are searching him because of his race and refuses to cooperate, so they arrest him. |
| DC Jill Harvey | 6–7 February (2 episodes) | Miranda Nolan | A detective constable and police officer who visit the Beale household after being alerted to Islamic extremism being researched from a laptop at the house. They question Bobby Beale (Clay Milner Russell), who is a Muslim, and take his laptop for examination. They later return Bobby's laptop and confirm that Bobby is innocent. |
| PC Patel | 6–7 February (2 episodes) | Uncredited | A detective constable and police officer who visit the Beale household after being alerted to Islamic extremism being researched from a laptop at the house. They question Bobby Beale (Clay Milner Russell), who is a Muslim, and take his laptop for examination. They later return Bobby's laptop and confirm that Bobby is innocent. |
| Felix | 6 February | Henry Everett | A man attending an Alcoholics Anonymous meeting with Linda Carter (Kellie Bright) and Shirley Carter (Linda Henry). |
| Mr Laurence | 6 February | Uncredited | A customer at Walford laundrette. |
| Tara Bassett | 7 February | Jennifer Healy | An estate agent performing a price evaluation of The Queen Victoria public house at the request of its landlord, Mick Carter (Danny Dyer). Mick's wife, Linda Carter (Kellie Bright), is surprised to find Tara and asks her to leave. |
| Captain Matthew Cox | 17–21 February (4 episodes) | Charlie Carter | The captain of the boat, the Smith-Holland, that is hosting The Queen Victoria public house's party, celebrating them winning the "Pub of the Year" award. He tries breaking up a fight between Phil Mitchell (Steve McFadden) and Keanu Taylor (Danny Walters), but is injured in the process. Captain Cox then announces an incident in the wheelhouse and asks all the guests to evacuate the boat, before confirming that the boat has hit something. |
| PC Paul Campbell | 17–18 February (2 episodes) | Jack Gogarty | A police officer who arrives at 25 Albert Square and meets Sonia Fowler (Natalie Cassidy). He explains that he is looking for Sonia's daughter, Bex Fowler (Jasmine Armfield), as Bex has bought drugs, which have been contaminated. He warns Sonia that this is a health issue and that Bex is not in any legal trouble. |
| Thug 1 | 18 February | Miles Jovian | Two men in a group of thugs who are racist towards Bobby Beale (Clay Milner Russell), Iqra Ahmed (Priya Davdra) and Habiba Ahmed (Rukku Nahar), following a series of racist internet posts about Bobby. Habiba berates them and when they start being physically violent, Bobby defends them. The thugs attack Bobby and knock him unconscious, before running away when Bex Fowler (Jasmine Armfield) appears and threatens to call the police. |
| Thug 2 | 18 February | Marek Wroblewski | Two men in a group of thugs who are racist towards Bobby Beale (Clay Milner Russell), Iqra Ahmed (Priya Davdra) and Habiba Ahmed (Rukku Nahar), following a series of racist internet posts about Bobby. Habiba berates them and when they start being physically violent, Bobby defends them. The thugs attack Bobby and knock him unconscious, before running away when Bex Fowler (Jasmine Armfield) appears and threatens to call the police. |
| Surgeon | 18–21 February (2 episodes) | Bijan Daneshmand | The surgeon performing Bobby Beale's (Clay Milner Russell) surgery after he is injured in a racist attack. He informs Bobby's father, Ian Beale (Adam Woodyatt), and grandmother, Kathy Beale (Gillian Taylforth), that Bobby has a bleed on the brain. He later updates Bobby's brother, Peter Beale (Dayle Hudson), about his condition. |
| ICU Nurse | 18 February | Shereener Browne | A nurse on the intensive care unit (ICU) that Bobby Beale (Clay Milner Russell) is being treated on. She tells Peter Beale (Dayle Hudson) that only family are allowed access, so he explains that he is Bobby's brother. |
| Police Officer | 21 February | Ally Manson | A police officer attending the boat crash at Fassett Dock. Whitney Dean (Shona McGarty) confesses killing Leo King (Tom Wells) to him. |
| Paramedic | 21 February | Emma Laird Craig | A paramedic who attends to Sharon Mitchell (Letitia Dean) when she gives birth in the funeral parlour. |
| Midwife | 21 February | Bethany Audley | A midwife who cares for Sharon Mitchell (Letitia Dean) at the hospital following the birth of her son. |
| Nurse | 24 February | Bryonie Pritchard | A nurse managing Daniel Cook's (Ade Edmondson) end-of-life care. She visits Daniel at his home and advises him and his partner, Jean Slater (Gillian Wright), on their next steps after Daniel's hospice is closed down. |
| Dr Laghari | 25 February – 8 September (4 episodes) | Ezra Faroque Khan | A doctor who tests Ben Mitchell's (Max Bowden) hearing and diagnoses him with severe hearing loss after he, Jay Brown (Jamie Borthwick) and Lola Pearce (Danielle Harold) visit the hospital to seek treatment. Ben and Callum Highway (Tony Clay) later attend another appointment with Dr Laghari to discuss Ben's hearing loss and cochlear implant operation, which the doctor informs him will be at least four weeks away. Dr Laghari then suggests a British Sign Language course for Ben and Callum. Ben then overhears Dr Laghari arguing with Frankie Lewis (Rose Ayling-Ellis). On the day of Ben's operation, Dr Laghari cancels it after discovering that Ben has a high temperature and is not well enough for surgery, leaving Ben frustrated. Having had the operation, Ben attends an appointment with Dr Laghari to test his cochlear implant, which is successful. |
| Dr Anderson | 27 February | Callum Coates | A consultant oncologist who informs Jean Slater (Gillian Wright) that her recent MRI scan displays no traces of cancer in her body and she therefore, does not require any more chemotherapy, although they will maintain a check on her. |
| Police Officer | 27 February | Martin Edwards | A police officer who visits Ben Mitchell (Max Bowden) and Jay Brown (Jamie Borthwick) following the disappearance of Ben's boyfriend, Callum Highway (Tony Clay). |
| Stranger | 2 March | Joseph Siddle | A man who robs Keegan (Zack Morris) and Tiffany Butcher-Baker's (Maisie Smith) flat, stealing Tiffany's laptop. Keegan and Tiffany find him, but he steals Tiffany's wedding ring from her finger and runs away. They chase after him and Keegan catches him, but PC Darryl Whisson (Daniel Moore) believes Keegan is the criminal and arrests him, allowing the thief to escape. |
| A&E Receptionist | 2 March | Magdalene Mills | The receptionist at Walford General emergency department when Keegan Butcher-Baker (Zack Morris) arrives for treatment. Keegan is not pleased with the wait on his treatment and disagrees with other people who arrived after him being treated first. He asks to speak with the receptionist's manager and when she informs him that is not possible, he stands and waits at her desk. Feeling threatened by Keegan, she calls security who escort Keegan from the waiting room. |
| Hospital Security Guard | 2 March | Simon Hibbs | A security guard at Walford General emergency department who escorts Keegan Butcher-Baker (Zack Morris) from the waiting room after he is confrontational to the receptionist (Magdalene Mills). |
| Car Lot Customer | 6 March | Daniel James | A customer at Square Dealz car lot who is annoyed with the car he has purchased and wants to speak with the owner. Ben Mitchell (Max Bowden), the owner, approaches the customer to inform him the car lot is closed. Ben cannot hear the man due to his severe hearing loss and becomes confused, so he walks away. As the man gets in his car to leave, Ben's daughter, Lexi Pearce (Isabella Brown), stands behind the car and shouts at him, which Ben cannot hear so does not notice. The man then accidentally knocks Lexi down in his car. |
| Judge Barbara Taylor | 6 March | Kate Cook | The judge at Whitney Dean's (Shona McGarty) bail hearing after she is charged with the murder of Leo King (Tom Wells). |
| Sophie Rundell | 6 March | Suzanne Ahmet | The prosecution barrister at Whitney Dean's (Shona McGarty) bail hearing after she is charged with the murder of Leo King (Tom Wells). |
| Prison Guard | 6 March | Deborah J Ball | A prison guard who brings Whitney Dean (Shona McGarty) her tea and informs her she will not be able to speak to her solicitor until the following day. |
| Officer Daniels | 9–12 March (3 episodes) | Jim Conway | A prison officer at Whitney Dean's (Shona McGarty) prison. He delivers Whitney's breakfast and discovers that she has harmed herself. Officer Daniels then informs Whitney that her visitor has cancelled and her solicitor will no longer be representing her. He returns to Whitney, who is on a hunger strike, to bring her dinner and rejects Whitney's request that he remove it, claiming that she is only hurting herself by not eating. The following day, he takes away Whitney's breakfast after she does not eat it. Officer Daniels visits Whitney again and suggests that she eat her food, reminding her that he is trying to look after her. He suggests that she drinks water as that is not food, but Whitney refuses everything. He then returns to speak with Whitney, offering her his support and telling Whitney about a woman who also attempted a hunger strike, but failed. |
| Dr Baise | 9 March | Naomi Frederick | The doctor who treats Whitney Dean (Shona McGarty) after she harms herself. She warns Whitney that if she continues, she will be given a psychiatric assessment. Dr Baise tells Whitney that having a solicitor places her in a better position for winning her case and encourages her to use the help she has. |
| Annie | 9 March | Judith Faultless | A woman attending a cancer support group at Walford East restaurant with Jean Slater (Gillian Wright) and Suki Panesar (Balvinder Sopal). Jean is trying to expose Suki as not actual having cancer and uses conversations with Annie to do this. Annie and Jean discuss how tiring chemotherapy is for the patient and how the patient often loses their appetite, especially since Suki claimed to have a good appetite. Jean encourages Suki to share her story, but Suki says that she finds discussing herself selfish and leaves. |
| Larry Sanderson | 10 March | Michael Aston | A man who is planning his wife's funeral at Coker & Mitchell funeral parlour with undertaker Stuart Highway (Ricky Champ). He recognises Stuart's partner, Rainie Branning (Tanya Franks), when she enters the parlour, causing him to cancel the funeral, claiming he does not want Rainie near his wife's funeral. Rainie later explains to Stuart that Larry was a semi-regular cast client when she was a prostitute. |
| Cliff | 10 March | Uncredited | A customer at Fox & Hair hair salon that Mitch Baker (Roger Griffiths) tells is late. |
| Dr Phillips | 12 March | Julia Winwood | A doctor who calls Lola Pearce (Danielle Harold) for her abortion appointment. |
| Hugo | 23 March | Gary Cady | A man who Ben Mitchell (Max Bowden) meets at The Prince Albert gay bar. Hugo flirts with Ben and reveals that he is married and his wife believes that he is at a conference and has erectile dysfunction. Ben tells Hugo to pay the bill so they can leave together; while Hugo is paying, Ben steals his car keys and leaves. Hugo then reports Ben to the police, who arrest him. |
| Police Officer | 23 March | Andrew David | A police officer who arrests Ben Mitchell (Max Bowden) for car theft after he steals Hugo's (Gary Cady) car and goes joyriding. |
| Al | 31 March | Daniel Solbe | A man whose wallet is stolen by Dotty Cotton (Milly Zero) at Ruby Allen's (Louisa Lytton) nightclub. He chases her along Bridge Street, where she threatens to tell the police that he and his friends tried to get her drunk. Peter Beale (Dayle Hudson) intervenes and makes Dotty return the wallet, before telling Al and his friends to leave. |
| Police Officer | 31 March | Alan Mandel | A police officer who arrives at The Queen Victoria public house looking for wanted suspect Phil Mitchell (Steve McFadden). The pub landlords, Mick Carter (Danny Dyer) and Shirley Carter (Linda Henry), lie that Phil has not been seen; the officer reminds them that it is illegal to obstruct a police enquiry. Mick and Shirley agree to call the police if they see Phil. |
| Estate Agent | 6 April | Alexi Armitage | An estate agent who views The Queen Victoria public house after Mick Carter (Danny Dyer) and Linda Carter (Kellie Bright) decide to sell it. He informs them that he believes the pub would sell fast. |
| Joe | 13 April | Lorenzo Pryce | A friend of Vinny Panesar (Shiv Jalota) who attends the illegal rave he is hosting at his flat. He is charging entry to the rave and tries charging Vinny's sister, Ash Kaur (Gurlaine Kaur Garcha), and her girlfriend, Iqra Ahmed (Priya Davdra), and Ruby Allen (Louisa Lytton), who Vinny is trying to impress. |
| Hari | 13–14 April (2 episodes) | Dee Ahluwalia | A friend of Vinny Panesar (Shiv Jalota) who attends the illegal rave he is hosting at his flat. As the police raid the rave, Hari is homophobic towards Vinny's sister, Ash Kaur (Gurlaine Kaur Garcha), and her girlfriend, Iqra Ahmed (Priya Davdra), and when they reject him, he insults them. Vinny intervenes and defends Ash, before physically attacking Hari until Ash stops him. Hari falls unconscious, so Vinny, Ash and Iqra take him to a bedroom. Ash, a doctor, assess him and determines that he will be fine. She tells Vinny and Iqra that should any questions be raised, they should say he fell and knocked his head. While Ash speaks with the police, Hari regains consciousness, so Vinny and Iqra have to prevent him from making any noise. Ash threatens Hari to keep quiet about the attack and blackmails him with money. |
| PC Waters | 14 April | Scott Ellis | A police officer who attends a disturbance at No. 5 Albert Square, where Vinny Panesar (Shiv Jalota) is hosting an illegal rave. |
| Custody Officer | 14 April | Alison M Nicol | The custody officer who places Keegan Butcher-Baker (Zack Morris) in custody following his arrest. |
| Jenny | 14 April | Uncredited | A woman who works with Jack Branning (Scott Maslen) and DI Steve Thompson (Philip Wright) at Walford police station. Jack asks her if she knows who is Keegan Butcher-Baker's (Zack Morris) arresting officer. Steve interjects and says it was him. |
| Val | 27 April − 5 May (2 episodes) | Nicola Wright | The leader of an Alcoholics Anonymous meeting which Linda Carter (Kellie Bright) and Phil Mitchell (Steve McFadden) both attend. Val welcomes Linda to the meeting and says that she does not need to share her story until she feels comfortable. Linda feels uncomfortable with Phil at the meeting, so decides not to share her story; noticing this, Val asks Linda how she is feeling at the end of the meeting. Val later leads another meeting which Linda and Phil attend; she comforts Linda when she becomes upset. |
| Delivery person | 5 May | Ewen MacIntosh | A delivery person who delivers a memorial bench, in honour of Dennis Rickman (Bleu Landau), to Ian Beale (Adam Woodyatt). He mistakenly believes the bench is in memory of Ian and tells him and his mother, Kathy Beale (Gillian Taylforth), that he is surprised that Ian, who is a local councillor, is popular enough to warrant a memorial bench. The delivery person struggles to understand why Ian has ordered himself a memorial bench, but Kathy announces that it is in honour of Dennis. |
| Paramedic | 18 May | Sarah Akokhia | A paramedic who treats Jean Slater (Gillian Wright) when she collapses in the local market. She speaks to Jean's friends, Shirley Carter (Linda Henry) and Tina Carter (Luisa Bradshaw-White). |
| Dr Callaghan | 18 May | Hannah Stokely | A doctor who treats Jean Slater (Gillian Wright) after she is admitted to Walford General Hospital following a collapse. She diagnoses her with lithium poisoning and informs Jean's family that she is being referred to a mental health nurse. After learning that Shirley Carter (Linda Henry) and Kush Kazemi (Davood Ghadami) have been accidentally overdosing Jean, she warns them that she will have to inform the police and social workers and they could face prosecution. Doctor Ash Kaur (Gurlaine Kaur Garcha) speaks to Dr Callaghan and gets her to agree to not inform the police. |
| Customer | 25 May | Ben Woodhall | A man who buys a fur coat from Shirley Carter (Linda Henry), who is trying to win a bet with her son, Mick Carter (Danny Dyer). When he decides not to buy it, Shirley tells him to give her £5 and take the coat as it has £10 in the pocket. Shirley's sister, Tina Carter (Luisa Bradshaw-White), later spots the man wearing the coat at The Prince Albert bar and is furious as it was her coat. |
| Kris | 26 May | Jacob Maynard | A friend of Ruby Allen (Louisa Lytton) who she introduces to her partner, Max Branning (Jake Wood). Ruby had told Max that she would arrange for them to have sex with a young, blonde woman, but instead surprises him with Kris; Max is shocked and refuses. Ruby explains that Kris is actually her friend and it his birthday, so they are going for a meal. Before leaving, Ruby tells Max that his reaction is sexist and he should reconsider his behaviour. |
| Harry | 2 June | Uncredited | A colleague of Jack Branning (Scott Maslen) who orders them coffee and doughnuts in Kathy Beale's (Gillian Taylforth) café. Jack informs trainee policeman Callum Highway (Tony Clay) that Harry is investigating a warehouse robbery, which has no CCTV footage, leaving Harry with lots of paperwork. |
| Police Officer | 15 June | Francesca Anderson | A police officer who finds Dotty Cotton (Milly Zero) and Vinny Panesar (Shiv Jalota) outside Ruby Allen's (Louisa Lytton) nightclub, selling drugs. She and her fellow officer search everyone in the club and when Dotty attempts to flee the club, the police officer arrests her for assaulting a police officer. |
| Trading Standards Officer | 7 September | Emma Carter | A Trading Standards officer who investigates KJP Pest Control after a report is made about them by Gray Atkins (Toby-Alexander Smith). |
| David | 7 September – 29 January 2021 (2 episodes) | Tom Joyner | A rival solicitor of Gray Atkins (Toby-Alexander Smith) who meets Gray's wife, Chantelle Atkins (Jessica Plummer), to discuss her divorcing Gray. David warns Chantelle that if Gray contests a divorce, it could cost her £1000s in legal fees. Four months later, he bumps into Gray in the Bridge Street Café and David offers his condolences and Gray finds out that Chantelle went to David for advice. |
| Douglas | 15 September | Dan Starkey | A council representative who meets with councillor Ian Beale (Adam Woodyatt) at The Queen Victoria public house to discuss a new promotion. Douglas is introduced to Ian's business partner, Sharon Watts (Letitia Dean), and they flirt, annoying Ian, who moves the meeting elsewhere. Douglas suggests moving the meeting back to the Vic to see Sharon, but the meeting is interrupted by Max Branning (Jake Wood), leading Douglas to leave. Douglas later calls Ian to offer him the position. |
| Audrey Colshaw | 25 September | Linzi Hateley | The headteacher at Walford Primary School who deals with a drug-use allegation against teacher Isaac Baptiste (Stevie Basaula) from Phil Mitchell (Steve McFadden). |
| Doctor | 25 September | Jennifer Adab | A doctor who informs Ellie Nixon (Mica Paris) that her son has died, before asking Denise Fox (Diane Parish) if she is the family of Ellie's adoptive grandson, Raymond Dawkins. |
| Sharmaine Campbell | 28 September | Gemma Knight-Jones | A businesswoman who meets Ian Beale (Adam Woodyatt) to discuss a potential catering contract. She is introduced to Ian's son, Bobby Beale (Clay Milner Russell), and they explain that they have been discussing Bobby's business proposal via email. Sharmaine is impressed with Bobby and likes his business ethic, vision and courage; she considers investing in his business and suggests that Ian should match her investment. Ian, who is struggling financially, tries to discuss the catering contract instead and uses the death of his daughter, Lucy Beale (Hetti Bywater), as an emotional advantage. As Sharmaine prepares to discuss the contract further, they are interrupted by Max Branning (Jake Wood), who confronts Ian about stealing his money; Sharmaine informs Ian that she cannot continue with the contract, but tells Bobby that she will be in contact about his proposal. |
| Jeremy | 29 September | Alim Jayda | The celebrant who performs the wedding ceremony of Rainie Branning (Tanya Franks) and Stuart Highway (Ricky Champ). Stuart is locked in a hearse, meaning that the couple miss their timeslot at the town hall, so Jeremy agrees to perform the ceremony unofficially in Albert Square. |
| DI Treharne | 5–6 October (2 episodes) | Andrew Ashford | A detective inspector who informs Suki Panesar (Balvinder Sopal) that they have been unable to find the person responsible for an attack on Martin Fowler (James Bye) at her shop, The Minute Mart. Suki later arranges a meeting with DI Treharne to report her son, Jags Panesar (Amar Adatia), for the assault, despite knowing that her other son, Vinny Panesar (Shiv Jalota), is responsible; she hands him Jags' jeans, which have Martin's blood on. DI Treharne returns the following day to arrest Jags for Martin's assault and the robbery of Ruby Allen's (Louisa Lytton) nightclub. |
| Judge Adams | 8–15 October (4 episodes) | Karlina Grace-Paseda | The judge overseeing Whitney Dean's (Shona McGarty) trial for the murder of Leo King (Tom Wells). When Whitney's solicitor, Gray Atkins (Toby-Alexander Smith), keeps interrupting from the visitors' gallery, she orders him to be silent. After Mick Carter (Danny Dyer) collapses on the stand, she adjourns the court. On the day of the closing statements, Whitney's barrister, Mark Osbourne QC (Guy Oliver-Watts), becomes ill, so law firm partner Laura Awoyinka (Sarah Paul) tries to persuade the judge to postpone to the following day; when she refuses, they have to call Gray to stand in as Whitney's barrister. When Gray arrives, she continues the trial, and eventually hands Whitney a not guilty verdict. |
| Mark Osbourne QC | 8–9 October (2 episodes) | Guy Oliver-Watts | The defence barrister at Whitney Dean's (Shona McGarty) trial for the murder of Leo King (Tom Wells). When Mick Carter (Danny Dyer) begins to suffer a panic attack on the stand, Mark suggests adjourning the court case. Whitney later arranges to meet Mark in the local café; feeling defeated, Whitney tells him and Sonia Fowler (Natalie Cassidy) that she plans on pleading guilty. He later becomes ill with food poisoning and cannot continue as Whitney's barrister. |
| Pattison QC | 8–15 October (4 episodes) | Paul Herzberg | The prosecution barrister at Whitney Dean's (Shona McGarty) trial for the murder of Leo King (Tom Wells). He questions Whitney about her relationship with Leo and her other failed relationships, and then Mick Carter (Danny Dyer) about the events of the day. Pattison's questioning makes Mick suffer a panic attack. He then watches as Whitney's defence solicitor, Gray Atkins (Toby-Alexander Smith), provides a closing statement, and nods to Gray when Whitney is found not guilty. |
| Jury Foreperson | 8–15 October (3 episodes) | Yvonne Wickham | The jury foreperson at Whitney Dean's (Shona McGarty) trial for the murder of Leo King (Tom Wells). She and the rest of the jury appear virtually through a television screen due to restrictions relating to the COVID-19 pandemic. She speaks on behalf of the jury to give a verdict, which is not guilty. |
| Court Clerk | 8–15 October (4 episodes) | Alexandra Afryea | The court clerk at Whitney Dean's (Shona McGarty) trial for the murder of Leo King (Tom Wells). Following the closing statements, she asks the jury foreperson (Yvonne Wickham) to announce the jury's verdict, which is not guilty. |
| Police Officer | 9 October | Neil Jennings | A police officer escorting Jags Panesar (Amar Adatia). When Jags' girlfriend, Habiba Ahmed (Rukku Nahar), arrives at the station, she charms the officer into letting her speak to Jags briefly. |
| Doctor Ellis | 16 October | George Verghis | A doctor who informs Phil Mitchell (Steve McFadden) that Raymond Dawkins has been discharged and has fully recovered, surprising Phil who was told by Raymond's adoptive grandmother, Ellie Nixon (Mica Paris), that he needed surgery. |
| Paul Skeggs | 19 October − 2 November (3 episodes) | Richard Thomson | A man who accepts a food parcel for his aunt, Mrs Hancock, from Honey Mitchell (Emma Barton) on behalf of the local food bank. He flirts with Honey and expresses an interest in getting involved in the food bank, before giving her his phone number. Paul and Honey go on a date, which is successful. They agree to go on a second date at Walford East restaurant the next day. Honey explains that she wants to take things slow due to previous relationships; he agrees and says that works for him. When she goes to the toilet, he pours a date rape drug into her drink. She soon becomes intoxicated and they leave the restaurant. On the way home, Honey phones her friend, Jay Brown (Jamie Borthwick), who rushes to find her after becoming concerned. When Honey passes out in an alleyway, Paul films her on his smartphone and unbuckles his belt, preparing to rape her. Before he can, Jay finds them and Paul flees. After Honey reports Paul to the authorities, she's informed that there is no evidence to charge him with any crime. When Honey's ex-husband Billy Mitchell (Perry Fenwick) learns what happened, he tracks Paul down and almost attacks him with a brick, but Jay stops him. Jay and Honey later learn that Paul has been charged with another assault to which he has pled guilty. |
| Iain | 20 October | Ben Lewis | A man who Kathy Beale (Gillian Taylforth) meets through a dating app after her grandson, Peter Beale (Dayle Hudson), lowers her age from 70 to 45 years old. Iain is 43 years old and Kathy is hesitant as he shares a name with her son, Ian Beale (Adam Woodyatt). Despite initial hesitations, she and Iain arrange a date. They meet at Walford East restaurant and Iain admits he is nervous about the date. Kathy is worried about Iain discovering her real age, especially when he asks her about her 40th birthday. They bond and as they leave, Kathy invites Iain to her gay bar, The Prince Albert, but she trips over the step and hurts her ankle. When Peter calls her gran in front of Iain, Kathy admits her real age and leaves the date to go to hospital. |
| Delivery Man | 20 October | Martin Atkinson | A delivery man who brings an order for Ruby Allen (Louissa Lytton) to her club, Ruby's. Ruby informs him that she did not order the delivery and when Stacey Fowler (Lacey Turner) interrupts to ask about her daughter, Lily Slater (Lillia Turner), he orders Ruby to sign so he can leave. Stacey then tells him to leave, so he warns that head office will be in contact. |
| Delivery Guy | 26 October | Stephen Aaron-Sipple | A delivery man who brings a car for Sonia Fowler (Natalie Cassidy) from a patient she treated for COVID-19 during the pandemic. Sonia warns him not to park in front of her house and he leaves the keys with a note from the patient. |
| Doctor | 30 October | Virginia Thompson | A doctor who treats Honey Mitchell (Emma Barton) after she is attacked and possibly raped by Paul Skeggs (Richard Thomson). She informs her that the police are waiting to speak to her if she wishes to. Honey's friend, Jay Brown (Jamie Borthwick), tells Honey that she does not need to report the incident if she does not want to, so the doctor asks him to leave the room. |
| DC Nikki Ward | 30 October | Theresa Petts | A detective constable who speaks to Honey Mitchell (Emma Barton) after she is attacked and possibly raped by Paul Skeggs (Richard Thomson). They discuss Honey's first date with Paul and DC Ward tries to understand Honey's tolerance for alcohol. When Honey becomes distressed, DC Ward finishes the questioning and later, she escorts her to a Sexual Assault Referral Centre (SARC). |
| Jake | 5 November | Barry Calvert | |
| Dr Hefni | 5 November | Farah Sardar | |
| Duncan | 12–17 November (2 episodes) | Edward Aczel | |
| Pastor Cassius Lawrence | 12 November – 16 March 2021 (8 episodes) | Ray Emmet Brown | |
| PC Sendhu | 17–20 November (3 episodes) | Sureni Kay | |
| Elliot | 20–24 November and 3–4 December (4 episodes) | Philip Desmeules | |
| DS Morgan | 4 December – 24 June 2021 (2 episodes) | Andy McLeod | A police officer who arrests Ian Beale (Adam Woodyatt) on suspicion of mortgage fraud. A year later, he arrests Chelsea Fox (Zaraah Abrahams) on suspicion of receiving stolen goods. |
| Joe | 31 December | Jeffrey Harmer | A counsellor from The Samaritans who speaks to Mick Carter (Danny Dyer) when he realises that he was sexually abused as a child. |
