= Drama Queens (TV series) =

British reality television series

- Genre: Reality
- Starring: Lucy Fallon; Jamelia; Ellie Leach; Laura Norton; Jorgie Porter; Roxy Shahidi; Rita Simons; Brooke Vincent; Amy Walsh
- Country of origin: United Kingdom
- Original language: English
- No. of series: 1
- No. of episodes: 8

Production
- Running time: 60 minutes (including adverts)
- Production company: Lime Pictures

Original release
- Network: ITVBe
- Release: 10 April – 29 May 2024

Drama Queens is a British reality television series broadcast on ITVBe and ITVX, following the lives of actresses who appear or have appeared in various soap operas including Coronation Street, EastEnders, Emmerdale and Hollyoaks. The series aired from 10 April 2024 for 8 episodes. On 7 September 2024, Drama Queens was cancelled after one series.

== Cast ==
The cast featured the following actresses:

- Lucy Fallon (Coronation Street)
- Jamelia (Hollyoaks)
- Ellie Leach (Coronation Street)
- Laura Norton (Emmerdale)
- Jorgie Porter (Hollyoaks)
- Roxy Shahidi (Emmerdale)
- Rita Simons (EastEnders and Hollyoaks)
- Brooke Vincent (Coronation Street)
- Amy Walsh (Emmerdale)

Also featuring:

- Mark Jordon, Laura's husband (4 episodes)
- Ryan Ledson, Lucy's boyfriend (4 episodes)
- Toby-Alexander Smith, Amy's husband (3 episodes)
- Kean Bryan, Brooke's boyfriend (3 episodes)
- Ben Harlow, Rita's boyfriend (3 episodes)
- Ollie Piotrowski, Jorgie's boyfriend (3 episodes)

== Episodes ==
No. overall	No. in series	Title	Original release date	Duration
1	1	"Episode 1"	10 April 2024	60 minutes
Ellie Leach discusses life after Coronation Street, sits down for a chat with her mum and goes behind the scenes on the Strictly Come Dancing Live Tour, before addressing the press intrusion and chatting to her cousin Brooke Vincent during a family get together. Meanwhile Jamelia and Jorgie Porter discuss working on Hollyoaks, and Lucy Fallon films a scene on Coronation Street before welcoming viewers into her home. Laura Norton chats to Roxy Shahidi as she prepares to returns to Emmerdale following maternity leave.
2	2	"Episode 2"	17 April 2024	60 minutes
Amy Walsh and Laura Norton go and watch Roxy Shahidi perform on the Dancing on Ice set, Jorgie Porter organises her fiancé Ollie's birthday, Brooke Vincent presents her show on Hits Radio and reveals that she is going to be performing in the stage play of Kay Mellor's The Syndicate, whilst organising a wellness event and talking about raising her kids after Coronation Street. Jamelia invites viewers in to her home and speaks out about her and her kids moving house for the first time after ending her relationship.: Absent: Rita Simons.
3	3	"Episode 3"	24 April 2024	60 minutes
Rita Simons reveals her home renovation plans and reminisces about playing Roxy Mitchell on EastEnders for ten years, whilst sorting through a box of possessions and discusses her new role in Hollyoaks. Lucy Fallon and Jorgie Porter catch-up whilst watching Lucy's boyfriend Ryan play football. Amy Walsh goes behind the scenes on the Emmerdale set, before welcoming viewers into her home. She goes horse riding with her husband Toby and their daughter, before going for lunch with her mum. Jorgie takes her son to work at Hollyoaks after being unable to find childcare, before chatting with Rita after they film a scene together. Lucy and Ryan discuss their relationship and she opens up about suffering a miscarriage, before throwing their son a 1st birthday party.: Absent: Roxy Shahidi, Jamelia, Brooke Vincent and Ellie Leach
4	4	"Episode 4"	1 May 2024	60 minutes
Ellie Leach gets emotional about being away from home as she prepares to present an award at the TV Choice Awards, before heading to rehearsals for her new stage role Cluedo 2. After being voted off Dancing on Ice, Roxy Shahidi returns to work at Emmerdale and plans her character's outfits with the wardrobe department, whilst Laura Norton opens up about her children being diagnosed with Usher syndrome, before the pair embark on crystal healing together. Brooke Vincent heads to London to meet her cast members for The Syndicate, but gets upset when she finds out her son has been unwell. Roxy heads to the Camp Beagle protest outside the Houses of Parliament with her Dancing on Ice co-star Lou Sanders. Roxy gives a speech, as did Gemma Collins, who was also in attendance. Amy Walsh heads to the Hollyoaks set to visit Jamelia. Laura and her husband take their children to an eye appointment. Ellie and Brooke catch up over lunch and cocktails.: Absent: Jorgie Porter and Rita Simons.
5	5	"Episode 5"	8 May 2024	60 minutes
Amy Walsh prepares to say goodbye to her husband Toby as he heads to work on a film for two weeks. Jorgie Porter goes to a spa retreat with mum and son before heading out for lunch where she discusses her upbringing. At the weekend, Lucy Fallon heads to the Coronation Street set as she is this week's cast member to appear in the "Star Tours" segment of the set tour, in which attendees are able to meet one of the cast and have their photograph taken. Rita Simons goes for colonic hydrotherapy and opens up about her hysterectomy. Jorgie and her boyfriend Ollie visit an event planner to organise a party for his clothing brand. Meanwhile, Amy goes out on a day date with Toby before taking their daughter to a farm with Amy's sister Sally and her sons. Rita prepares to have a home gym built in her garden before having electric impulse therapy. Lucy goes for drinks with her Coronation Street co-star Colson Smith where they discuss their friendship and his upcoming appearance on Celebrity Big Brother. Amy and Roxy catch up as they head to Jorgie's boyfriend's clothing brand party. Amy's daughter gets upset as she FaceTimes Toby whilst he's away. Rita and her boyfriend Ben go for a dog walk on the beach and she discusses the menopause.: Absent: Jamelia, Brooke Vincent, Ellie Leach and Laura Norton.
6	6	"Episode 6"	15 May 2024	60 minutes
Absent: Lucy Fallon, Rita Simons, Ellie Leach and Laura Norton.
7	7	"Episode 7"	22 May 2024	60 minutes
Absent: Jorgie Porter.
8	8	"Episode 8"	29 May 2024	60 minutes
