= Sakira Vel =

English actress (born 1990)

- Born: Sakira Thangavel; 1990 (age 35–36); Newham, London, England
- Occupation: Actress
- Years active: 2024–present
- Television: EastEnders

Sakira Thangavel (born 1990), known professionally as Sakira Vel, is an English actress. Originally having trained as an emergency medical doctor, she worked in the NHS for over a decade. She transitioned into an acting career in 2024, later being cast as Ash Panesar in the BBC soap opera EastEnders in 2026.

== Life and career ==
Vel was born Sakira Thangavel in Newham, London in 1990. She is of South Asian decent and is fluent in both English and Tamil, as well as knowing conversational Japanese and Korean. She also holds a BA in Carnatic Music and South Indian Dance from the Academy of South Indian Arts, as well as being a trained Bharatanatyam dancer. Vel initially trained as an emergency medical doctor, having studied medicine and surgery at King's College London. She went on to work within the NHS for over ten years, as well as working as a doctor in Australia for over three years.

In 2024, Vel made a career shift and transitioned into acting. She began her professional acting career appearing in various short films, advertisements and theatre projects. In 2026, she was cast in the BBC soap opera EastEnders as Ash Panesar. An established character, the role was previously portrayed by Gurlaine Kaur Garcha from 2019 to 2023. Vel's first appearance aired in September of that year. Speaking on the similarities she shares with her character, Vel appreciated that Ash was a doctor due to her real-life experience in the profession, as well as also being South Asian.

== Credits ==
=== Film and television ===
Year	Title	Role	Notes
2025	The Souls	Woman in Blue	Short film
2025	Thalaimuraith Thaai	Ratha	Tamil short film
2025	Vanthaan Vendraan Velvaan	Maya	Tamil short film
2025	97	Woman 3	Short film
2026	The Thief	Sinitta	Short film
2026	Gym Buddy	Faye	Short film
2026	Camper Clad	Sangeetha	Film
2026	The Price	Annie	Film
2026	Redshift	Charity Worker	Short film
2026	Voodoo Party	Darcy	Film
2026	All My Girlfriends After You	Aranya	Short film
2026	EastEnders	Ash Panesar	Regular role
2027	Retracing Jemma	Rose	1 episode

=== Stage ===
Year	Title	Role	Venue
2025	Exes and Ohs	Mara / Sally	Barons Court Theatre
2025	The Infinite Colours on the Drinks Aisle	Adhira	Engine Room
2025	Act on Tap	Rebecca	The Pubb
