= Gray Atkins =

Fictional character from EastEnders

- EastEnders character
- Portrayed by: Toby-Alexander Smith
- Duration: 2019–2022, 2026
- First appearance: Episode 5893; 29 March 2019
- Last appearance: Episode 7383; 13 August 2026
- Introduced by: Kate Oates (2019); Ben Wadey (2026)
In-universe information
- Other names: Jasper
- Occupation: Lawyer; Fast food worker
- Father: Alex Atkins
- Wife: Chantelle Baker (until 2020); Chelsea Fox (2021–2022)
- Sons: Mackenzie Atkins; Jordan Fox
- Daughters: Mia Atkins
- Grandmothers: Sheila Atkins

Gray Atkins is a fictional character from the BBC soap opera EastEnders, played by Toby-Alexander Smith. He was introduced by executive producer Kate Oates in episode 5893, broadcast on 29 March 2019, as the patriarch of the Atkins family, which included Gray, his wife Chantelle Atkins (Jessica Plummer), and children Mia (Mahalia Malcolm) and Mackenzie Atkins (Isaac Lemonius). Before his introduction and during the beginning of his time on the show, Gray was depicted as a charming and confident businessman, as well as a loving husband and committed father, before Gray and Chantelle became the focus of a storyline about domestic abuse. The show worked with charities such as Refuge and Women's Aid to depict the storyline in an accurate and sensitive manner. In September 2020, EastEnders announced that the storyline would end with Gray killing Chantelle to reflect, which included a sharp increase in spousal murders.

Following the conclusion of his story with Chantelle, Gray served as the show's main antagonist in 2020 and 2021. He murdered Tina Carter (Luisa Bradshaw-White) and Kush Kazemi (Davood Ghadami) before entering a second marriage to Chelsea Fox (Zaraah Abrahams), with the two having a son together, Jordan Atkins. The relationship began to sour as Gray became physically abusive towards Chelsea shortly before the show announced that Smith was being written out of the show in February 2022 for storyline purposes. Smith admitted that he enjoyed the challenge that came with playing a character as deceitful as Gray. In episode 6649, broadcast 10 March 2022, Gray's departure was depicted as his arrest after his murders were finally uncovered, a downfall Smith considered "a long time coming". In May 2026, it was reported that Smith would reprise the role for a short stint. He returned on 29 June of the same year, and departed on 13 August.

The character of Gray was highly disliked by viewers due to his depraved actions, frequently being described by the media as "evil" and "vile". Smith was subjected to online harassment on social media from people who struggled to differentiate him from his character, which he noted saw a peak during Gray and Chantelle's domestic abuse storyline. Smith opined that the backlash was "worth it" if televising a domestically abusive relationship helped a victim escape one in real life. Despite the mixed reactions to his character, Smith received various awards and nominations for his portrayal of Gray, including a British Academy Television Award nomination for "Must-See Moment".

== Development ==
=== Introduction and characterision ===
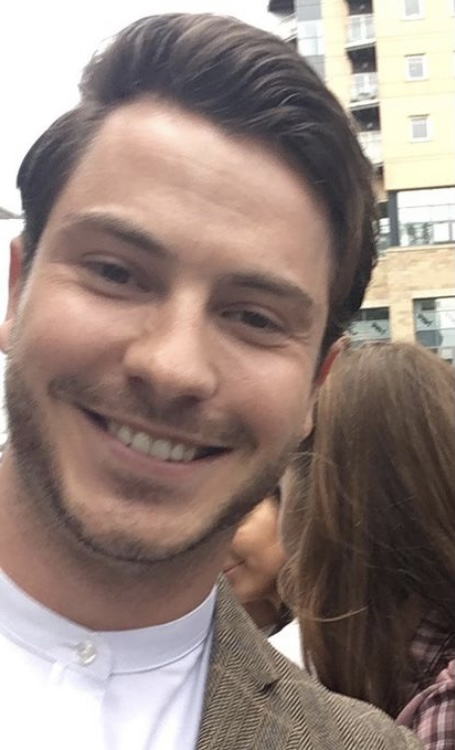
Gray (Toby-Alexander Smith, pictured) was initially billed as a "high-flying businessman".

Gray's arrival and Toby-Alexander Smith's casting was announced on Digital Spy on 11 March 2019. He was introduced as the patriarch of the Atkins family, an extension of the Taylor family, which included Gray, his wife Chantelle Atkins (Jessica Plummer), and their children Mia (Mahalia Malcolm) and Mackenzie (Isaac Lemonius). Smith and Plummer had already begun filming scenes prior to the announcement. Smith said he was "delighted" to join EastEnders, as he had been a fan of the soap for a long time, adding that he was "looking forward to seeing what Albert Square [had] in store for Gray". By extension, the Atkins family as a whole were announced to "cause a stir" in Walford upon their arrival. It was reported that Gray and Chantelle would arrive in Walford with a "secret agenda" and that Chantelle would appear first, followed by Gray and their children, with the family's arrival being teased to "ruffle feathers" among residents of Walford. Gray went on to make his first appearance on 29 March 2019.

EastEnders executive producer Kate Oates detailed that Gray and Chantelle's history was that Gray had charmed Chantelle years before, causing her to leave the Taylors and start a family with Gray. The producer characterised Gray as a "hard-working solicitor whose success took Chantelle away from the [Taylor family]" years prior due to his charm and good looks. Gray was further characterised by the media as a "high-flying businessman" who was "charming, confident and very proud of everything he's achieved", having previously worked hard in a city law firm to achieve his family's luxurious lifestyle. Radio Times described Gray as a "London boy done good" who is grateful for what he has in life. Plummer teased Gray's more nefarious side in May 2019, saying that Gray "had the potential" to become one of the soap's greatest villains, adding that Smith "could do it justice". Smith explained in June 2019 that Chantelle and Gray were "just trying to settle into the square" at that point, as it was a very different living arrangement from what they had previously. He added that Gray still hadn't integrated with the Taylors by that point, especially Chantelle's father, Mitch Baker (Roger Griffiths).

=== Marriage to Chantelle Atkins ===
==== Domestic abuse ====
On 12 July 2019, the show confirmed that Chantelle and Gray would become the focus of a storyline about domestic abuse. The announcement was made after a scene where Gray aggressively punched Chantelle in their home was aired. The show worked with charities such as Refuge and Women's Aid, which specialise in helping victims of domestic abuse, to portray the storyline in an accurate and sensitive manner. Teresa Parker, head of communications for Women's Aid, insisted that it was "important" to portray domestic abuse on screen as realistically as possible, and that EastEnders had worked with the charity from the early development of the storyline, which included advising themes and details in the scripts, and ensuring the storyline was "thoroughly researched" by experts in domestic abuse. Sandra Horley, chief executive of Refuge, explained: "The more we all understand domestic abuse [and the more we can spot the signs], the more women, like Chantelle, will be able to seek help", adding that the organisation commended EastEnders for highlighting this "insidious issue".

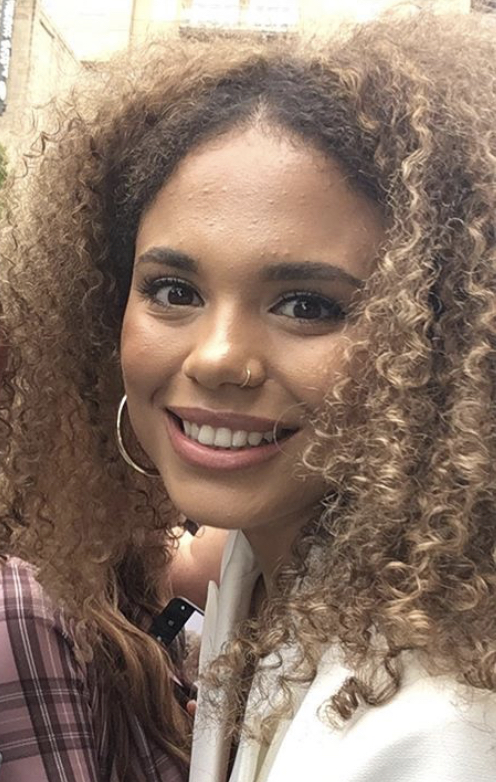
Chantelle Atkins (Jessica Plummer, pictured) was Gray's wife and the subject of his abuse. Smith described his scenes with Plummer as "intense", but believed worked well together.

Oates illuminated that from Chantelle and Gray's arrival, they contributed to the storyline's key theme of not knowing what goes on behind closed doors as they initially made their neighbours envious of them, and, in her words: "the very first time we crossed the threshold of [Chantelle and Gray's house], [viewers] saw the truth of their relationship, and the violence Gray subjects Chantelle to". Oates also hoped that the storyline would encourage domestic abuse victims to escape their situation and seek help. Smith was pleased that the subject of domestic abuse was being tackled on EastEnders, teasing that the storyline would "depict how hidden from sight domestic abuse remains even today". He added that: "to the unaware eye Gray appears to be a loving husband and a committed father; but his charm is a front for the power and control he exerts over Chantelle – an experience all too common to thousands of women up and down the country today". The actor hoped that by tackling the subject, the show could raise awareness of "the importance of changing societal values so that both women and men's rights to live free from abuse, invasion, disempowerment and intimidation are respected".

During the storyline, it was revealed that Gray's abuse had begun years prior, and that the pair moved to Walford in the hopes of a fresh start and for Gray to potentially change his behaviour. After an attack saw Gray injure Chantelle's stomach, she discovered that she was pregnant. In October 2019, Smith confirmed that the show would tackle Gray's backstory. Smith commented there was an "insecure" side to the character, adding that he found it "very difficult" to identify with Gray, but he had to "find ways of [...] finding humanity in Gray because he is very layered". Smith added that Gray isn't a "monster" without reason, as his toxic behaviour stemmed from negative experiences throughout his life. Following Chantelle's pregnancy discovery, the actor suggested that Gray saw it as an opportunity to turn over a new leaf, believing it was "very much a motivation to try and reshape his values and beliefs [as Gray] knows that he needs to change now". Despite this, Smith admitted uncertainty regarding if Gray's pride would allow him to "lose that entitlement". Smith believed Gray's abusive behaviour was a reflection of his desire for "power and control", adding that "the minute something slips off-kilter, [...] he panics", afraid of losing everything he has. Chantelle went on to miscarry the baby, choosing not to tell Gray out of fear of his reaction.

After Gray hid a fight he had in a nightclub from Chantelle, she told him that his abuse had to stop or else they wouldn't be having another child, deciding to attend couples therapy sessions. At one of the sessions, Gray revealed his past, which involved a childhood where he was subjected to abuse from both his parents, especially his father. Speaking to Inside Soap in October 2019, Smith called Gray a "challenging role" to play as it wasn't easy to identify with Gray, but that Gray was influenced by the toxicity between his parents when he was a child. Smith and Plummer knew that the domestic abuse storyline was coming from early in their run, but didn't know when it would start as Oates and Sen wanted the storyline to be a "slow-burner". The actor believed that Gray was a person with "many layers" that made him who he was, and that the prospect of Gray changing was not a "black-and-white case of, 'Okay, it's an easy fix'". Smith described filming his scenes with Plummer as "intense", especially with the added responsibility of depicting the subject matter delicately, but added that he and Plummer worked well together. He further cited humiliation as Gray's primary trigger for his violent outbursts.

Gray later grew violent again with Chantelle, to the extent that he accidentally broke her arm, and, after discovering that she didn't tell him about the miscarriage, raped her in hope that she would conceive another child. In January 2020, Smith revealed that the storyline would get darker and that Gray's abuse would not be found out by Chantelle's family any time soon. The actor explained that Gray's mental state had deteriorated to the point that he wouldn't see the issue in his behaviour fixed by therapy sessions and that the possibility of Gray's children finding out about the abuse was something the show was considering as "it's a very important thing to consider that children are very savvy with the arguments that their parents have". Smith addressed that it would take "something big" for Gray to change his way, and believed the character wanted to and was "intelligent enough" to do so, but would struggle due to his "self-entitlement [and] stubbornness". Smith added that Gray had "been this way for such a long time" that it was unsure whether he could change, commenting "I think there's a part of him that does want to change, but whether or not he can, we'll see". The actor admitted that he was unsure if Gray would get a comeuppance, despite acknowledging that many viewers wanted him to meet one. Smith named Gray as the "hardest" role he's ever portrayed as Gray is "layered" and viewers see all of them, including "vulnerability, aggression, his lovely bloke persona and insecurity". He continued by saying he and Plummer were "very lucky" to have built a friendship before filming their scenes together as Chantelle and Gray, as it allowed the pair to establish personal boundaries with each other.

==== Murder of Chantelle ====
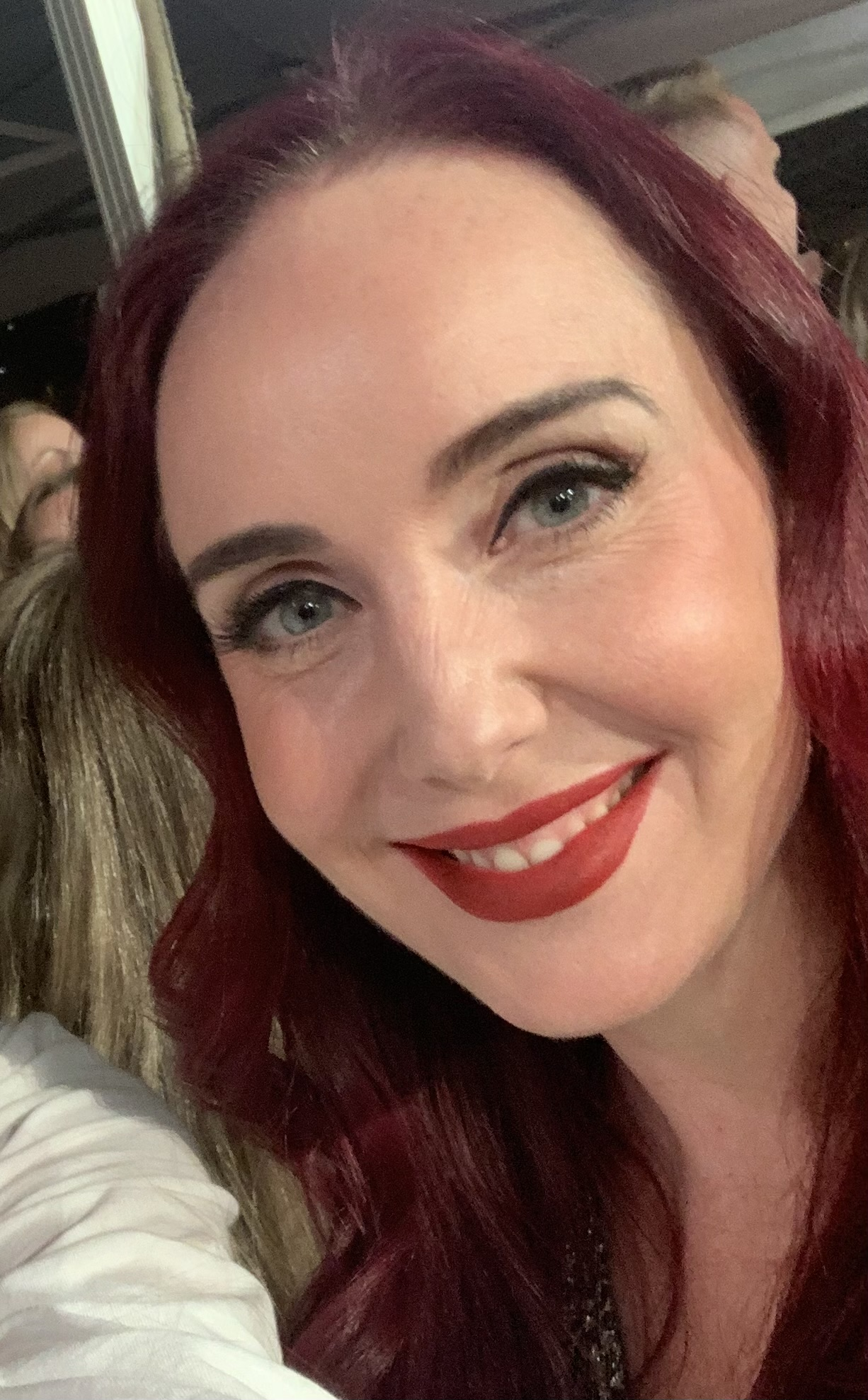
Executive producer Kate Oates (pictured) was inspired to portray Gray killing Chantelle after learning the high statistic of women being killed by a partner.

In August 2020, it was announced that Chantelle would try to escape Gray. Oates was thinking of a long-running story which would hold a "significant impact" for the show. As a result, around one month later in September 2020, Oates and fellow boss, Jon Sen, came to the decision to have the domestic abuse storyline conclude with Gray killing Chantelle following an escalation of his violence towards her during quarantine. Such a story outcome had not been portrayed in a soap or serial drama before, which further enticed Oates to commission the plot. Additional details surrounding the murder penned that Chantelle would try leaving, but Gray would kill her to stop her. Sen commented that the storyline was important to air and that the ending was planned to be tragic from the beginning "with the intention of embedding the stark reality of domestic abuse at the heart of the Atkins family". He added that: "being able to shed light on the realities of what goes on behind closed doors has never been more crucial given the harrowing statistics as a result of the current pandemic and hopefully Chantelle's story will encourage people to speak out to someone they trust and get the support that they need".

Smith felt it was important for the story to end tragically, echoing hopes that the storyline's conclusion would help give people the courage to speak out "before it's too late". The storyline ended in this fashion due to statistics surrounding domestic abuse victims at the time. Refuge reported seeing a "soar" in calls and contacts during the pandemic and Women's Aid reported that over two-thirds of survivors reported their domestic abuse escalating during the COVID-19 lockdowns. Spousal murder also saw a sharp increase during the beginning of the lockdown as Oates was inspired to portray the story's outcome after hearing a story from the radio magazine show Woman's Hour and learning the high statistic of women being killed by a partner. Following criticism that the story may discourage victims of domestic abuse from leaving, Teresa Parker, head of communications at Women's Aid, explained that it is a realistic conclusion supported by research and wanted it to create "important conversations". Smith appeared on the ITV talk show Loose Women and was asked why EastEnders chose to announce Chantelle's death before the scene aired, to which he responded that the reason was because it may have triggered some viewers, especially those who had experienced domestic abuse before. Smith added that being involved in the storyline had improved his overall understanding of domestic abuse.

Gray went on to kill Chantelle in episode 6132, broadcast on 18 September 2020. After Chantelle announced that she would leave Gray, they had an argument which concluded with Gray pushing her, only for Chantelle to land on a knife in a dishwasher. Plummer recognised that her character's death may not be what audiences want to see, but believed it was important that they did see it, as it reflected real life. Upon reading the scripts, Smith felt they were "very ambitious" and was unsure how the scene would be filmed, saying "[he and Plummer] just had to trust that the end result was going to pay off". Plummer and Smith filmed the entire segment, which lasted for approximately 15 minutes, in one take, which is unusual for regular filming. Plummer explained that this was to avoid losing momentum and likened it to being in theatre. Plummer also detailed that she and Smith rehearsed for the episode beforehand, the first rehearsal she had throughout her time on the show. Writers previously foreshadowed the nature of Chantelle's death in scenes broadcast in January 2020, which was noticed by viewers after the broadcast of her death. In the scene, Gray warns Chantelle about placing cutlery upwards in the dishwasher.

=== Additional murders ===
==== Tina Carter ====
Following Luisa Bradshaw-White's announcement of her character, Tina Carter, leaving EastEnders, it became apparent to viewers that Gray would have a hand in her character's departure as Tina and her sister Shirley (Linda Henry) moved in with Gray leading up to the departure. On 28 December 2020, Tina found out that Gray killed Chantelle, threatening to expose this. To stop this, Gray trapped her inside the house and strangled her to death while Shirley was out. Gray convinced Tina's family that she fled Walford to escape legal charges for the attack on Ian Beale (Adam Woodyatt), and disposed of her corpse in an unknown location. Fans noted that Tina's phone would have recorded Gray's actions on voicemail, indicating a possible way Gray would receive retribution. Sen revealed that Gray would receive a comeuppance for murdering Tina, as, in Sen's words: "The soap Gods never forgive something like that and we need to see Gray pay, but I'm going to keep when that'll happen close to my chest but it's something we've talked about a lot". He also suggested that there would be a chance that Gray would "strike again".

Despite some fans theorising that Tina had survived Gray's attack, Bradshaw-White confirmed that her character died. Bradshaw-White deemed it "weird" to film her character's death scene, especially as her death was depicted on-screen. Despite this, she commented that filming the scene with Smith was "fun", especially playing dead. While the Carter family, especially Shirley, grew suspicious of Gray due to his lack of urgency around finding her, Gray paid a homeless woman to pretend to be Tina. The woman was intentionally caught shoplifting before giving her fake name to authorities and running away. Over a year later, in February 2022, it was confirmed that Gray had buried Tina's corpse under the abandoned Argee Bhajee restaurant, as many fans had speculated. In March, Mirror announced that the Carter family would learn about what happened, with Shirley vowing that Gray would get what he deserves.

==== Kush Kazemi ====
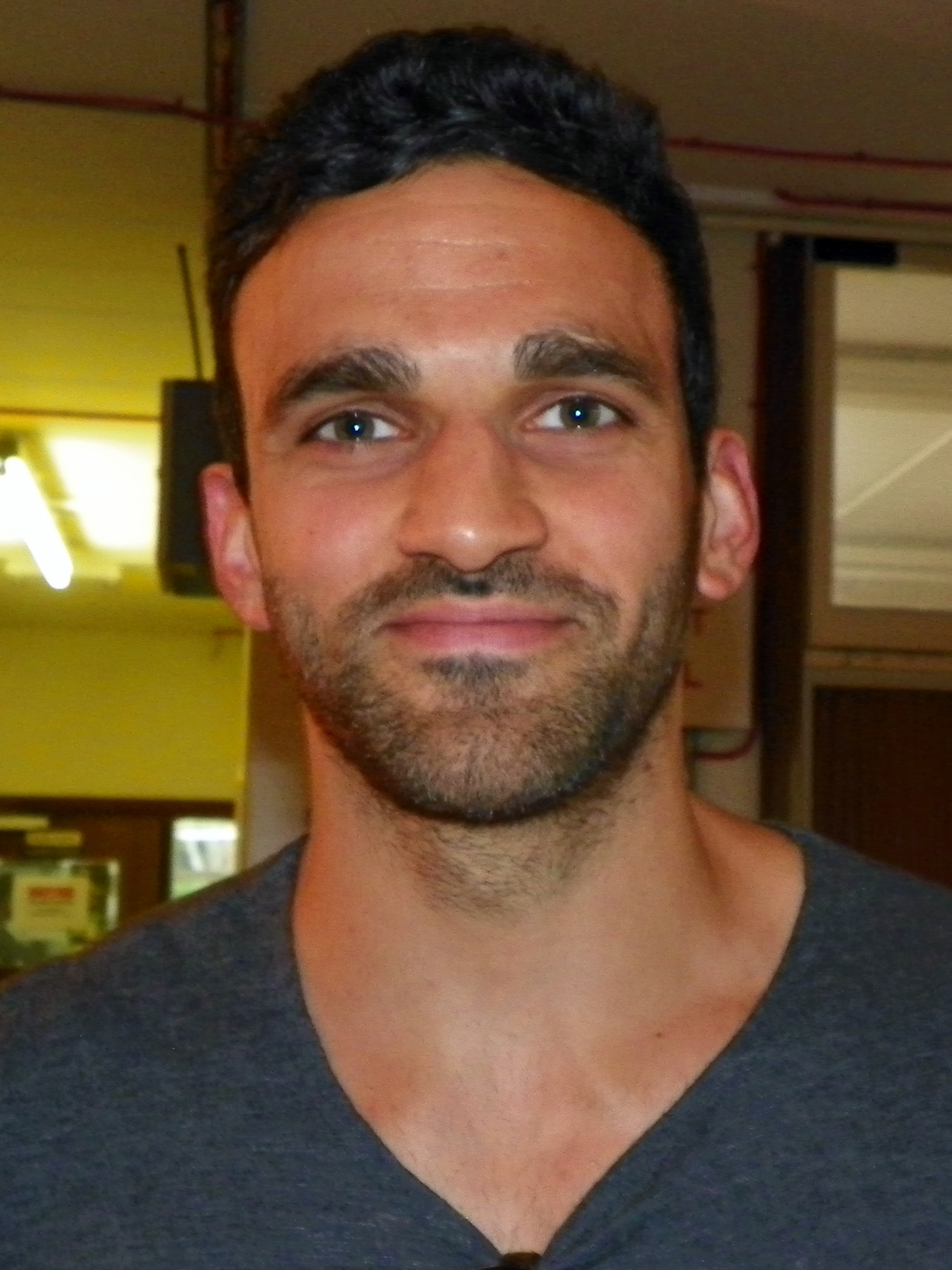
Kush Kazemi (Davood Ghadami, pictured) is murdered by Gray after being pushed in front of a train.

In September 2020, Davood Ghadami, who played Kush Kazemi, announced that he would leave EastEnders during 2021. The nature of the character's departure was left ambiguous, but it was revealed that the exit would be the climax to a "huge plot" that was set to unfold in 2021. This announcement, alongside Gray's increasingly odd behaviour towards Kush over Kush's growing relationship with Whitney Dean (Shona McGarty), led fans to predict that Kush was going to be murdered by Gray. This suspicion increased when Whitney proposed to Kush in March 2021. On 19 April 2021, Gray discovered that Kush and Whitney had planned to leave Walford together. Enraged, Gray became violent and aggressive towards Kush when Whitney briefly left, as he claimed that Kush was ruining Whitney's life. Kush, shocked at Gray's outburst, told him that he needed help. The interaction became physical, causing Gray to lunge at Kush and fall onto the tracks. Kush helped Gray up before berating Gray for his reckless actions. When an oncoming train arrived, Gray pushed Kush in front of it, resulting in Kush being run over and dying, making him the victim of Gray's third murder. Kush's death was ruled an accident due to "lack of evidence" as CCTV footage had been vandalised. Gray manipulated Whitney into believing that the Mitchell family were responsible for Kush's death.

Ghadami teased in July 2021 that Gray would not go unpunished for his actions, and would not get away with his them for much longer. He added that Smith was "great" when they filmed their scenes together and was interested to see how Gray's story would continue, opining that the show had "managed to shape [Gray's] character and it'll be interesting to see where it goes". Mirror announced in March 2022 that the Carter family would discover what happened to Tina, with no word if Kush's murder would also be solved. In response to Gray's confession to the murders in March 2022, Ghadami detailed that he was able to "finally put Kush Kazemi to rest".

=== On-off relationship with Whitney Dean ===
In March 2020, fans started to speculate that Whitney Dean, played by Shona McGarty, had a romantic interest in Gray as the two had grown close over the course Whitney being a client for Gray after she stabbed her stalker, Leo King (Tom Wells), in self-defence. In May 2020, during Gray's marriage to Chantelle, the show hinted that he would cheat on her with Whitney after he rescued Whitney from being held hostage by Leo's grieving mother Michaela Turnbull (Fiona Allen). While Whitney's crush on Gray had become apparent to viewers by this point, the show implied that Gray may return her feelings. In June 2020, it was announced that Whitney would make a move on Gray after fans speculated an affair between them was on the horizon. whitney kissed Gray on 8 June 2020, which Smith commented caught Gray off-guard. He added that the kiss would "certainly add a new element to the case that [Gray] wasn't prepared for". He insisted that "at this stage, Gray doesn't have any feelings towards Whitney whatsoever" as "his main agenda is to try and keep her calm and encourage her to stay positive and not panic". Smith believed Gray helping Whitney was coming from "predominantly good place", but that "Whitney sees Gray as her saviour – and he quite likes that". He added that Gray didn't expect an emotional connection of "any sort", preferring to keep things "strictly professional".

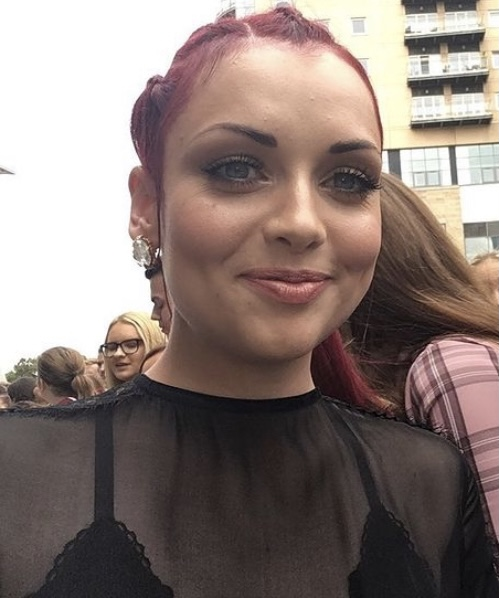
Gray develops an obsession with Whitney Dean (Shona McGarty, pictured) in the aftermath of Chantelle's death.

By January 2021, Gray and Whitney remained friends after Gray successfully cleared Whitney of legal charges. Gray now wanted Whitney to fill Chantelle's role and become a family unit as Gray needed "someone to control". Gray manipulated Whitney into not going on a planned date with Kush, instead convincing her to join him and the children to see a movie. Gray asked Whitney to move in with him, but she declined as she was concerned he was still grieving over Chantelle's death, unaware that Gray killed her. By the time things heated up between Whitney and Kush, with Whitney proposing to Kush, Gray had developed an "obsession" with Whitney. A surprise visit from Kush whilst Whitney babysat for Gray enraged Gray when he returned home, as he was very aggressive with both of them, hurling insults, and exposing his true nature. McGarty thought it would be "amazing" if Whitney could be the one to take down Gray, as she was often asked in public if Gray was going to be caught. McGarty further warned that Gray "could explode at any moment" and, as Whitney still had no idea of what Gray was capable of by that point, she believed "Whitney should start looking over her shoulder".

After Gray found out Whitney and Kush were planning to leave Walford, he murdered Kush by pushing him in front of an oncoming train while Whitney was away after telling him he was "ruining" her life. Gray fled the scene before Whitney returned, so she didn't know Gray was behind Kush's murder. Based on Gray's behaviour, Whitney believed Gray had something to do with it, as she accused him of killing Kush the following day. Gray managed to regain Whitney's trust, as in September 2021, the show teased that the two would begin another romance ahead of Gray's confirmed downfall. In December 2021, McGarty teased that Whitney would find out about Gray's murders, saying she hoped that Whitney would get "the ultimate revenge" on Gray as he killed her fiancé. The actress admitted that she didn't know what was going to happen, calling it "really annoying and exciting" to be in the dark. She did disclose that the revelation would come as a big shock to Whitney, as she previously believed that Phil (Steve McFadden) and Ben Mitchell (Max Bowden) were responsible for Kush's death. The actress explained that Whitney "would never have thought [Gray] was capable of murder", calling it "heart-breaking as Whitney and Chantelle were [very] close". She compared it to watching a scary documentary where "your next door neighbour is a murderer".

Whitney was later revealed to be the one who would "work out" that Gray killed Chantelle, before rushing to stop his wedding to Chelsea Fox out of fear she would suffer the same fate. Whitney went on to find out the truth about Gray after asking his ex-boss Laura why she fired him, with Laura saying it was because of Gray's misogyny and violent outbursts. McGarty explained that "Whitney has known Gray for a long time so she's seen behaviours that she finds concerning, like aggression". She continued by saying "I think initially she put [his aggressive behaviour] down to the fact he'd lost his wife, he's a single parent and he's finding it all very difficult, but the warning signs are there now and she's expecting to find out that there is more to it and that he's not a very nice person". Whitney uncovered Gray's abuse when she stumbled across his posts from Chantelle on a domestic abuse forum. She shared the information with her friend Kheerat Panesar (Jaz Deol) and they worked out that Gray was responsible for Chantelle's murder and then succeeded in exposing Gray's true self to Chelsea, who agreed to help them build evidence to get Gray arrested.

=== Second marriage to Chelsea Fox ===
In May 2021, Gray and Chelsea Fox, played by Zaraah Abrahams, began flirting, which made many consider Chelsea as Gray's next victim. On 15 June 2021, the show confirmed that a relationship between the characters would ignite as they would go out on a date. Bosses further detailed that Gray and Chelsea would bond after Chelsea hires Gray as a lawyer to represent her and help her escape legal charges. Upon hearing news that Chelsea and Gray would begin a relationship, Abrahams was worried that her character would face a similar fate to Gray's ex, Chantelle. Abrahams told Inside Soap that "Chelsea has no clue what Gray is really like", adding that Chelsea sees Gray as little more than a "high-flier [who is] doing well for himself". She explained that as soon as Chelsea puts her mind to something, "she doesn't see it going wrong until it's really gone wrong" and that asking Gray out is "the only way [Chelsea] knows how to ask for help". Abrahams further illuminated that Chelsea's determination with Gray was because, in her words: "she thinks he's a good-looking guy, he's doing well for himself, so she pursues it. She's turning it on to get a freebie at first, but then there is actually an attraction, so she goes with it". Adding that "there is a spark there, and with that comes a few perks – which makes the attraction stronger". The actress drew parallels between Gray and Chelsea's father Lucas (Don Gilet), as both were killers, addressing that "it's an odd thing because her dad Lucas is a murderer, and now she's dating one, although obviously she doesn't realise that. But if and when she does find out, I think that would shake anybody". In an interview with Digital Spy, Smith detailed that while he does believe Gray has feelings for Chelsea, "there's always got to be something in it for Gray".

He's constantly lying to everyone to keep his family afloat, while concealing all the dreadful things he's done. Chelsea's fun, and takes his mind off all those things – he just thinks, 'Why not?' Even though he knows what she's after, she's fun to be around. Gray arrogantly believes he is deserving of a bit of fun in his life – and that's what Chelsea represents...

— Abrahams discussing Gray's attraction to Chelsea.

When Gray took Chelsea with him to the birthday party of his boss, Laura Awoyinka (Sarah Paul), she warns Chelsea about Gray, prompting speculation that Laura would be the next character Gray murders, although this never happened. After Chelsea found an earring worn by Tina Carter on the night she died, many viewers became increasingly worried about Chelsea's safety. Abrahams told Inside Soap that she would have "loved" for Chelsea to uncover Gray's secrets and take him down, as long as Chelsea herself didn't face repercussions. Chelsea went on to cheat on Gray after openly rejecting his children. Chelsea wore Chantelle's ring, which angered Gray and caused him to lash out. As a response, Chelsea broke up with Gray.

On 5 November 2021, Gray proposed to Chelsea in the wake of discovering she was pregnant, who swiftly accepted after deciding she needs Gray in her life. Chelsea's mother Denise (Diane Parish) was against Chelsea marrying Gray, and was announced to become "hellbent" on stopping the upcoming wedding. Gray and Chelsea's wedding was set to be held on Christmas Day 2021. Leading up to the wedding, it was announced that Whitney Dean would try crashing it after finding out about Gray's murders. Abrahams described the upcoming wedding as "classy" and that Chelsea was "feeling organised, focused, and [...] looking forward to it". The actress added that Chelsea had grown to love Gray, dismissing his outbursts as normal, and that Chelsea saw Gray as someone who is loyal, hard-working, social, and "someone who is going to be stable in her life". On the wedding day, Chelsea was told by Whitney about Gray killing Chantelle, only for Gray to talk her around and the wedding to proceed. After the wedding, Chelsea began to feel sick and was rushed to hospital as she had gone into premature labour. The marriage turned physically abusive in February 2022 when Gray slammed Chelsea's hand in a drawer, blaming her by calling her clumsy.

=== Departure ===
In August 2021, Oates and Sen announced that the show had begun writing Gray's downfall. Oates admitted that "Gray's story was always intended to be a longer arc after the death of Chantelle, but even though some of his actions have been extreme, they have always been grounded in the roots of Gray's character". She added that Gray is "a classic narcissist" as "everything he does is designed to fit a narrative that absolves him from guilt, and paints him out to be a good guy" and that Gray "tells himself that Chantelle died in a terrible accident" and that "Tina had to die so he could be there for his kids" and "Kush had to go, because he and Whitney are 'meant to be'", as Gray believed he was "the centre of his own universe" and "nothing is his fault". Sen teased that the culmination to Gray's story would go "back to the grass roots of the story" and be a "fascinating turn of events for the Atkins family", thinking of it as "the next chapter" of sorts. Oates added that Gray's life would throw him a "curveball" and that "Gray hasn't been as clever as he thinks. Smoking guns are all over the Square, just waiting to be found. Gray's downfall awaits". In September, Smith confirmed on Loose Women that Gray's comeuppance was "definitely on the cards" and that he would be "punished in true soap fashion". The actor agreed that Gray "needs to be caught".

In February 2022, it was announced that Gray would meet his comeuppance for his actions in the week beginning with 7 March 2022. The following month, March 2022, extended details surrounding Gray's downfall were announced. Smith deemed, in an interview with Zoe Ball, that Gray's journey on the show had been "emotional". He commented that while filming he became emotional as his journey as Gray had been such a "rollercoaster" and to see it come to an end affected him more than he expected. Smith appeared on The One Show to tease the ending to Gray's story on 7 March 2022. He addressed that he had enjoyed the challenge that came with playing a character as immoral as Gray. The actor believed Gray genuinely thought he could get away with all of his crimes. Smith teased that Gray's MO leading up to his exit was that he wanted to gain Chelsea's trust and run away with her, even being tempted to tell her about Chantelle to prove he trusts her. Gray's final scenes were set to involve "someone" taking revenge on Gray and his eventual arrest after the knowledge of his murders got out. In an interview with Digital Spy, Smith detailed he enjoyed filming Gray's final scenes, teasing that they were "very intense" and "a long time coming". When asked to describe Gray's final episode in three words, the actor responded with: "intense, thrilling, and satisfying".

Despite speculation that Gray would be killed and placed at the centre of a whodunit, Gray's final appearance was episode 6649, broadcast 10 March 2022. The episode showcased Gray being confronted by various residents after confessing to the murders of Chantelle, Tina, and Kush. After trying to kill Chelsea, Gray considered jumping off the railway bridge, but was told by Whitney that he had to face justice. Gray tried jumping regardless, but was stopped by Whitney and Mitch Baker (Roger Griffiths), resulting in his arrest. Shortly after Gray's exit aired, Smith was interviewed by Digital Spy on the exit. He believed that Gray's story ended appropriately as many people wanted justice for Gray's victims, saying: "there was no room for him to have an easy way out and it would have been wrong if they'd have done that. I do think, from the audience's perspective, it's a satisfying ending to the storyline". Smith felt that Gray returning in the future was possible, commenting: "it's EastEnders at the end of the day, so who knows". On 28 March 2022, the show confirmed that Gray pled guilty to his crimes off-screen.

=== Return ===
In 2026, it was announced that Smith would return to the show for a short stint. His return was later confirmed to be part of the storyline where his son Jordan (Jahsaiah Williams) is hit by a car and subsequently at risk of never walking again. The show also introduced Gray's grandmother, Sheila Atkins (Sheila Ruskin) to facilitate his return. Speaking of his return, Smith said: "Gray was a brilliant character. It was a gift to play Gray and it'll be fascinating to know what four years in prison would do for someone like him. His identity was very much, you know, control and power and very manipulative. Being in prison would very much strip a lot of that identity. So it was fascinating to tap into that psychology." Gray's return aired on 29 June 2026.

== Storylines ==
=== 2019–2022 ===
Gray arrives in Albert Square with his wife, Chantelle (Jessica Plummer), and their two children, Mia (Mahalia Malcolm) and Mackenzie (Isaac Lemonius), to start anew together. He is known to be a hard-working solicitor who seems devoted to his wife and their children. However, it soon emerges that Gray is a violent man who domestically abuses Chantelle; the follow-up of such incidents implies that he raped her after forcing her to go upstairs with him to bed. Soon enough, he befriends fellow resident Whitney Dean (Shona McGarty), and they start a flirty friendship together; Gray later legally represents Whitney after she kills her stalker, Leo King (Tom Wells), out of self-defence.

Chantelle is impaled to death by a kitchen knife in the dishwasher after Gray pushes her (2020).

In 2020, Gray's prolonged abuse towards Chantelle leads her to decide to leave with their children and her secret flame, Kheerat Panesar (Jaz Deol). However, Gray discovers her plan and confronts Chantelle on the night she is supposed to leave. Chantelle stands up to Gray and demands that he let her go, but Gray refuses and shoves her onto a knife-packed dishwasher in a fit of rage. Chantelle is fatally impaled from the impact and dies from blood loss after Gray, despite his fault, chooses to watch her succumb to her injuries rather than provide help before he stages the scene to make her death appear accidental. The following weeks see a broken Gray struggling with his guilt and briefly consider turning himself in to the police for his crimes. Gray comes close to killing himself and his kids by attempting to fill his flat with gas fumes with his lighter but is stopped by fellow neighbour, Shirley Carter (Linda Henry). When she sees Gray struggling to cope, she convinces him to move forward with his life and support his family in Chantelle's honour.

Afterwards, Shirley and her sister, Tina (Luisa Bradshaw-White), move in with Gray. He momentarily offers to represent Tina in court after she is accused of assaulting Ian Beale (Adam Woodyatt) at The Queen Victoria public house. But as she begins to inform others about his violent behaviour, he gathers Tina's belongings and urges her to go; nonetheless, Tina's developing misgivings about him cause her to discover that Gray had killed Chantelle after abusing her. Gray stops her and strangles her to death as she tries to flee and reveal him to everyone. After hiding her body, he informs Shirley and her son Mick (Danny Dyer) that Tina has fled as a result of her assault allegation. When Shirley grows suspicious of Gray over the circumstances behind Tina's whereabouts, he pays a homeless woman to intentionally be caught shoplifting and pretend to be Tina when questioned by police.

When Whitney starts seeing Kush Kazemi (Davood Ghadami) in early 2021, Gray becomes increasingly obsessed with her, and his jealousy intensifies when Whitney gets engaged to Kush. Gray confronts Kush for at the train station as Kush and Whitney decide to flee together, claiming Kush is stealing Whitney from him. Once a fight breaks out after Gray accuses Kush of ruining Whitney's life, Gray falls on the tracks. Just in time, Kush desperately drags Gray to safety. However, Gray then sees an opportunity and shoves Kush in front of the oncoming train, killing him. Gray then flees the station and appears to have gotten away with murder once more when Kush's death is made public the next day. Whitney believes that Kush was killed by Phil (Steve McFadden) and Ben Mitchell (Max Bowden) and in effort to exact revenge on them, Whitney accidentally runs over Phil's romantic partner Kat Slater (Jessie Wallace) with Gray's car.

Gray begins dating Whitney's friend, Chelsea Fox (Zaraah Abrahams) later in 2021, though his estranged boss Laura Awoyinka (Sarah Paul) warns Chelsea not to get too close to him. Upon discovering this, Gray retaliates by sending Laura threatening messages under the pseudonym Jasper. However, he is caught and, combined with a later police caution for public indecency, leads to Gray's termination from the law firm. While firing Gray, Laura tells him that she knows what kind of a man he really is, angering Gray. Gray later snaps at Chelsea for unintentionally purchasing Chantelle's ring from a pawn shop, motivating Chelsea to end their relationship. After a few weeks, Gray tells Shirley and Mick that he witnessed Tina being loaded aboard a bus. Pretending to be Tina, he texts Shirley using a burner phone, begging her to send him £10,000 because he is facing financial ruin from his job loss.

When Phil is arrested, Gray visits Ben after Phil is detained and offers to legally represent Phil. He is successful in getting Phil released, much to Shirley's dismay as she believes Phil is to blame for Tina's disappearance. Shirley confronts Gray for aiding the Mitchells before attacking Phil with a baseball bat after demanding answers from him. Later on, Gray woos Chelsea into reconciling with him, and the two eventually become engaged. However, Whitney discovers a hidden internet forum where Chantelle had complained about her abusive husband, and as a result, Whitney learns that Gray had been abusing Chantelle for months prior to the night he killed her. After she informs Kheerat, they attempt to prevent Chelsea from marrying Gray; however, their plan is unsuccessful, and they exchange vows before Chelsea is informed of the forum and what Gray did to Chantelle.

Chelsea's hopes to escape Gray are dashed when she becomes pregnant and gives birth to a son, called Jordan. Although she agrees to allow Gray assist in raising her child, she tells Whitney that she still intends to bring him to justice for what happened to Chantelle. Kheerat tries to persuade Gray to confess about Chantelle, resulting in a fight where Kheerat knocks Gray unconscious. When Tina's body is discovered a few days later, Whitney begins to suspect that Gray also killed her. She tells Mick and Shirley of her theory, and they both believe it — not just because they have suspicions about Gray, but also because Whitney clarifies her second theory, which holds that Gray had killed Chantelle after abusing her. Gray begins to fear that his arrest is inevitable, so he plans to escape with his children and Chelsea.

Gray confesses to Chelsea that he murdered Chantelle before he almost chokes Chelsea to death when he learns she has recorded his confession to the police. When the police then break into his home, he flees. Gray then visits Chantelle's mother, Karen (Lorraine Stanley) to pick up his kids, but Karen refuses to let him take the children and informs the police of his presence, so Gray runs to The Queen Victoria, where Mick and Shirley attack Gray for murdering Tina. Gray is then chased to a railway bridge by Whitney. Not wanting to go to prison, Gray attempts suicide by jumping, but Whitney stops him, determined to see justice served. He tries to goad Whitney into letting him go by confessing to Kush's murder, but it doesn't work and when Whitney nearly loses her grip, Mitch intervenes by helping her force Gray up to safety before Gray is arrested for his crimes and sent to prison for life.

=== 2026 ===
Over four years later, in 2026, Jordan (now Jahsaiah Williams) is hit by a car driven by Ian, causing spinal damage. Chelsea struggles to cope with expenses and reveals to her half-sister Libby (Belinda Owusu) that Gray's family had been sending Jordan money for years. Libby gets in touch with Gray's estranged grandmother Sheila (Sheila Ruskin), who offers to help with Jordan's finances, which Chelsea reluctantly accepts, when Sheila insists she is no longer in touch with Gray. However, in private, Sheila looks at a photo of Gray in her purse, suggesting that she is still close to him. Chelsea calls Karen to ask about Sheila but does not get a response. Later, unbeknownst to Chelsea, Jordan answers a call from Karen on her phone, where Karen confirms that Sheila is indeed in touch with Gray and that involving her is akin to inviting Gray back into her life. Chelsea then meets Sheila in the cafe and introduces her to Jordan. Sheila shows up unannounced one day with gifts for Jordan. Chelsea is irritated that Sheila has overstepped her boundaries and tells her to leave. Disappointed, Sheila visits Gray in prison and tells him about Jordan's accident. She then asks him for advice on how to win Chelsea over. The following day, Chelsea is touched when Sheila buys Jordan a better wheelchair. Meanwhile, Chelsea and Libby's half aunt, Kim Fox (Tameka Empson) is horrified when she learns that Sheila is in touch with Chelsea. However, Chelsea is adamant that she trusts Sheila and offers her the chance to visit Jordan whenever she likes. Sheila visits Gray again, who manipulates her into giving him regular updates about Jordan.

Sheila later informs Gray that Ian has received a prison sentence of eight months and that she has agreed to pay for Ian's appeal. Gray warns her that Chelsea will ignore her as soon as she fills her financial needs. Gray then spots Ian arriving at his prison, signalling a vendetta. Ian is unnerved to meet Gray in prison but to his surprise, Gray defends him against other inmates and fixes his broken glasses. Gray is later outraged when Ian reveals that Chelsea shouted at Jordan on the night of the incident and was flirting with men. Gray later manipulates Sheila into bringing Jordan to the prison to visit him, which she does by stealing Jordan's passport. Gray enjoys bonding with his son and plans to take Jordan away from Chelsea and have him live with Sheila. Although Sheila is uncertain, she changes her mind when a furious Chelsea slaps her after discovering she took Jordan to visit Gray. After manipulating Ian into asking Chelsea for a visit, Gray horrifies Chelsea after coming face-to-face with her at the prison. Gray orchestrates a prison riot, forcing the visitors to stay in prison. Meanwhile, Sheila abducts Jordan and takes him to an airport, but he is rescued by Kim, Chelsea, and Denise Fox (Diane Parish). Gray blames Ian for the failure of the plan and during a scuffle between the pair, Ian accidentally stabs Gray. Although Ian gets Gray medical attention, he is devastated when he realises the incident could increase his prison sentence. Meanwhile, Chelsea visits Gray at the prison hospital and tells him she is not afraid of him anymore and that he will never win against her.

== Reception ==
=== Awards and nominations ===
Smith won various awards and nominations for his portrayal of Gray. At the 2019 I Talk Telly Awards, he was nominated for "Best Soap Newcomer", losing to Max Bowden (Ben Mitchell, EastEnders). Smith and Plummer were nominated for "Best Soap Partnership" at the 2020 I Talk Telly Awards, but lost to Ian Bartholomew and Shelley King (Geoff Metcalfe and Yasmeen Nazir, Coronation Street). Smith was shortlisted for "Best Villain" at the 2020 Inside Soap Awards. Smith won "Best Villain" at the 2021 Version Soap Awards. The scene where Gray kills Chantelle was nominated for "Must-See Moment" at the 2021 British Academy Television Awards, but lost to Diversity's Britain's Got Talent performance based on the events of 2020. He was nominated for "Best Villain" at the 2021 Inside Soap Awards, losing to Paige Sandhu (Meena Jutla, Emmerdale). He was nominated at the following 2022 Inside Soap Awards, again losing to Sandhu. He was nominated for "Villain of the Year" at the 2022 British Soap Awards, losing to Maximus Evans (Corey Brent, Coronation Street).

=== Critical and viewer response ===
Four months into Gray's tenure, Sarah Ellis of Inside Soap wrote that, by that point: "Gray seems far too good to be true – he must be hiding something". Inside Soap's Laura-Jayne Tyler praised the characters of Chantelle and Gray following their introduction. She opined, "The potential for huge drama is practically dripping off them! [...] Mark our words, there's a massive plot brewing here". Angie Quinn of MyLondon called Gray's various attacks on Chantelle "devastating" to watch. The domestic violence storyline with Chantelle was called "powerful" by Justin Harp of Digital Spy. Smith said that sometimes when he was approached and asked if he played Gray, he would get "a bit of a look" from the person, adding that it was "worth it" if the representation helped someone leave an abusive relationship. He also noted that people were comparing the storyline to a 2001 domestic abuse storyline between Trevor Morgan (Alex Ferns) and Little Mo Slater (Kacey Ainsworth). Fiona Sturges of The Independent praised EastEnders for featuring a domestic abuse storyline, further praising Gray's different approach to abuse from Trevor, writing: "Where Trevor was the archetypal bad guy, a snarling, hard-drinking bully, Gray is, on the surface, gentle and charismatic, reflecting the fact that abusers will often go to great lengths to charm those around them, and to discredit and undermine those they hurt". Fans sang praises to Smith and Plummer for their performances on Twitter. Chantelle's death scene was labelled a "bullseye" by Inside Soap, with the magazine writing that it was not only "explosive, brutal, and horrific", but that Gray had left people contemplating the "true meaning of evil".

Words like "evil", "sick", and "vile" became commonly used to describe Gray in tabloid media. Smith was subjected to social media harassment across his entire tenure as Gray and often had abuse shouted at him in the street from viewers who couldn't separate him from his character. Smith detailed on Loose Women that people struggled to differentiate him from his character "for a while". When asked about the fan reaction to Gray's storylines, Smith respondeed that he found it interesting how at first people struggled to differentiate him from his character, especially during the abuse storyline with Chantelle. A scene where Gray lent Whitney a dress that belonged to Chantelle after he killed her reportedly left fans "disgusted". McGarty commented that people in public would often tell her to "stay away from Gray" during her character's involvement with him.

The scene where Gray kills Kush attracted 106 viewer complaints due to "horrifying scenes". The topic of the complaints was listed as "violence". The show's decision for Gray to kill Kush was criticised by Calli Kitson of Metro, who labelled it a "complete mistake" as it required a problem gambling storyline Kush was involved in to be dropped. The decision was also criticised by Kitson's colleague, Claire Lindsay, who labelled it "a quick gasp which served to further undermine a powerful story and give an unnecessarily gruesome ending to one of the few generally amiable guys in the [soap] genre". She continued, commenting that "the dispatching of Kush to give Gray a few more months of shelf life is just one in a long line of botched up death stories [in soap operas]". Louise Griffin of Metro described the scene as a "shock". Viewers were reportedly "devastated" by Kush's exit as the character was considered a fan favourite. Many voiced their criticisms on Twitter about the death being overly and unnecessarily gruesome. Writing for Irish Mirror, Rose Hill reported that fans "were left sickened" by the scene, opining that the scene was "tragic". Some criticised the plot device of CCTV cameras malfunctioning, believing it was too convenient to be plausible.

Gray and Chelsea's first kiss was dubbed "the kiss of death" by some fans as they predicted Gray would murder her. Stephen Patterson of Metro described Gray as a "master manipulator". After Chelsea was sent home with an electric tag from court, Inside Soap commented that a woman who "can't get away" is Gray's "ideal". Quinn (MyLondon) reported that viewers expressed their "anguish" at Chelsea growing closer to Gray and predicted she would be his next victim. The amount of time it took for Kheerat and Whitney to report Gray to the authorities was criticised by audiences, a sentiment echoed by McGarty, who admitted that "maybe they should have gone to the police sooner, but then it wouldn't be EastEnders". Upon Gray's exit, Sophie Dainty of Digital Spy called Gray a "nimble narcissist". Dainty praised Gray's final episode, calling it a "satisfying end to a story that may have divided the audience". She added that "Gray is gone but is unlikely to be forgotten any time soon". Tyler (Inside Soap) criticised the direction of Gray's storylines throughout his time on the show, voicing frustration about how: "Gray's serious domestic violence story turned into a pantomime serial killer plot", adding that it was the weakest thing about EastEnders in 2021. In February 2025, Radio Times ranked Gray as the 15th-best EastEnders villain, with Laura Denby writing that Smith's portrayal was "haunting", despite agreeing that his storylines "turned into a farce".

== See also ==
- List of soap opera villains
