= Amy Walsh (actress) =

English actress (born 1987)

- Born: Amy Victoria Walsh; 27 March 1987 (age 39); Bradford, West Yorkshire, England
- Occupation: Actress
- Years active: 1995, 2011–present
- Spouse: Toby-Alexander Smith (m. 2023)
- Children: 2
- Family: Kimberley Walsh (sister)

Amy Victoria Walsh (born 27 March 1987) is an English actress, known for her role as Tracy Metcalfe on the ITV soap opera Emmerdale.

== Early life ==
Walsh was born on 27 March 1987 in Bradford, West Yorkshire. She is the youngest of four children born to John and Diane Walsh. She is the younger sister of Kimberley Walsh, a member of the pop group Girls Aloud, and Sally Walsh, who played the character of Lyn Hutchinson on the soap opera Emmerdale between 1997 and 2000. They were raised with brother Adam in Allerton.

== Career ==
As a child, Walsh appeared as Emily in the short film Past Memoirs (1995). Her first television role came in 2011, portraying the character Jennifique McQueen in the fourth series of the Channel 4 soap opera Hollyoaks spin-off, Hollyoaks Later. In January 2014, Walsh appeared on the ITV game show All Star Family Fortunes as a member of her sister Kimberley's family.

In July 2014, Walsh joined the cast of the ITV soap opera Emmerdale as Tracy Metcalfe. She was introduced as the girlfriend of established character Sam Dingle (James Hooton) and made her first appearance in the show on 7 July 2014. Walsh had previously auditioned for the role of Rachel Breckle, which ultimately went to Gemma Oaten. In June 2023, Walsh was announced as one of the contestants competing in the eighteenth series of Celebrity MasterChef. She eventually reached the final of the show, which was won by Wynne Evans. In 2024, she starred in the first and only series of the ITVBe reality series Drama Queens.

== Personal life ==
Walsh has been in a relationship with former EastEnders actor Toby-Alexander Smith since 2020. Their first daughter was born in 2021. They announced their engagement in August 2022. They married in August 2023. In March 2026, Walsh gave birth to their second daughter.

In 2025, Walsh and Smith launched the Walsh Academy North, a drama school for kids aged 7 to 16, opened in June 2025, with both actors serving as coaches to train fresh talent. They expanded on their existing drama school, the Walsh Academy, to offer speech and drama classes, aiming to build confidence and creativity.

== Filmography ==
| Year | Title | Role | Notes | Ref. |
|---|---|---|---|---|
| 1995 | Past Memoirs | Emily | Short film | |
| 2011 | Hollyoaks Later | Jennifique McQueen | Main role; series 4 | |
| 2014 | All Star Family Fortunes | Herself | Guest | |
| 2014–present | Emmerdale | Tracy Robinson | Regular role | |
| 2023 | Celebrity MasterChef | Herself | Contestant; series 18 | |
| 2024 | Drama Queens | Herself | Main cast | |

== Awards and nominations ==
| Year | Award | Category | Work | Result | Ref. |
|---|---|---|---|---|---|
| 2016 | Inside Soap Awards | Sexiest Female | Emmerdale | Nominated | |
| 2019 | I Talk Telly Awards | Best Soap Performance | Emmerdale | Nominated | |
| 2020 | 25th National Television Awards | Serial Drama Performance | Emmerdale | Nominated | |
| 2021 | Inside Soap Awards | Best Actress | Emmerdale | Nominated | |
| 2021 | I Talk Telly Awards | Best Soap Performance | Emmerdale | Nominated | |
| 2024 | National Film Awards UK | Best Supporting Actress in a TV Series | Emmerdale | Won | |
