= Ash Panesar =

- EastEnders character
- Sakira Vel as Ash Panesar (2026)
- Portrayed by: Gurlaine Kaur Garcha (2019–2023); Sakira Vel (2026–present)
- Duration: 2019–2023, 2026–present
- First appearance: Episode 5980; 29 August 2019
- Introduced by: Jon Sen (2019); Ben Wadey (2026)
- Gurlaine Kaur Garcha as Ash Panesar
In-universe information
- Other names: Ash Kaur
- Occupation: Doctor
- Family: Panesar
- Father: Nish Panesar
- Mother: Suki Panesar
- Stepmother: Eve Unwin
- Brothers: Kheerat Panesar; Jags Panesar; Vinny Panesar
- Half-brothers: Ravi Gulati
- Wife: Gigi Gagnon (2025–present)
- Nephews: Davinder "Nugget" Gulati; Tyrion Ahmed
- Nieces: Avani Nandra-Hart

Ash Panesar (also Kaur) is a fictional character from the BBC soap opera EastEnders, played by Gurlaine Kaur Garcha between 2019 and 2023, and Sakira Vel since 2026. Ash was introduced as the bisexual Punjabi Sikh girlfriend of established character Iqra Ahmed (Priya Davdra) in Episode 5980, broadcast on 29 August 2019. Garcha expressed excitement to be cast as a Sikh LGBTQ character due to the opportunity for representation that it presented. Later revealed to be an estranged member of the Panesar family, Ash's storylines have mainly focused on her complicated family relationships, especially her mother Suki Panesar (Balvinder Sopal) due to her sexual orientation, her romantic relationships with Iqra and Peter Beale (Dayle Hudson), being a victim of racism at the hands of Aaron Monroe (Charlie Wernham), and her eventual exit from the soap after accepting a job in Canada. Ash was reintroduced during Episode 7403, broadcast on 21 September 2026, with Vel assuming the role.

Across her time in the serial, Ash was depicted as one of the more morally upright members of her family, often characterised as being empathetic, resilient and strong-minded. Despite her tumultuous relationship with her mother, Garcha was often adamant that the two characters were more similar to each other than it may initially seem. In January 2023, it was announced that Ash had been axed by executive producer Chris Clenshaw, with the character making her final appearance in episode 6659, broadcast on 8 March 2023. The door was left open for a future return. Ash attracted praise from critics and viewers, with Laura-Jayne Tyler of Inside Soap praising the "subtle girl power" Ash brought to the show, Zara Woodcock of the Daily Mirror commenting that the character had been a wide success with audiences, and Garcha often noting that she received supportive messages from fans.

== Development ==
=== Introduction and family establishment ===
The character, played by Garcha, originally appeared in two episodes on 29 and 30 August 2019. Ash was created as part of a new "trailblazing" LGBT storyline for the soap and her appearances came following Iqra's coming out to her sister Habiba Ahmed (Rukku Nahar), where Iqra disclosed that she was in a relationship with a woman. Ash's first episode was teased to see Iqra struggle to reveal the truth of her sexuality to her grandparents Arshad Ahmed (Madhav Sharma) and Mariam Ahmed (Indira Joshi), but thanks to Ash's moral support, she would announce their relationship with pride. During her first stint, she was also teased to be flirted with by Robbie Jackson (Dean Gaffney), to no avail.

I do think there is a shortage for representation of Punjabi families on TV, so it's amazing to be a member of the first one in Walford. To also be playing a bisexual Punjabi girl is something I wouldn't have had any other way.

— Garcha discussing the representation that came with Ash's character.

In October, it was revealed that Ash was the sister of the Panesar brothers; Kheerat (Jaz Deol), Jags (Amar Adatia), and Vinny (Shiv Jalota). The brothers had arrived in Walford to look for her, as she had cut off the family years prior due to having an argument with their mother. Before the twist was announced, the show had hinted that she was related to the brothers in some way. Garcha sang her excitement to receive the part, commenting that she was "thrilled" to be cast as a member of the new family. Their introduction made them the first Punjabi Sikh family in the soap's history, which pleased Garcha as: "not only was I going into an iconic soap I was going in as a character in a Punjabi family representing something that is so true to me". She continued by saying that "Punjabi families are full of character", and are "loving and caring", so was excited by the opportunity to represent one. Garcha opined that the Panesar family represented "exactly what a normal Punjabi family is like" and teased that there would be "shocks" to come for the family, which "excited" her. Garcha added that she predicted audiences being "glued to their screen" by what was to come for her character.

=== Characterisation ===
Ash, a doctor, arrived in Walford four years after cutting her family out of her life. This was due to the "incredibly tough" treatment she had been subjected to by them, especially from her mother regarding her sexual orientation, which was described as "vile" and "brutal" and having "scarred" her. It was detailed that Ash had "no interest" in rebuilding her relationship with her family, partly due to Ash "desperately trying to keep in control" of her newfound independence from her family.

Ash has been described as "tough", "strong", "kind", someone who "knows what she wants", and "long suffering". Garcha explained that a trait of her character is her persistence, as she addressed: "With Ash, if she gives her time to something, it's important to her – she's very honest and strong in her beliefs, if she is engaged with something, she wants it". Garcha admired how "Ash isn't afraid to speak her mind", and commented that she enjoyed "bringing out the fiery side of Ash". Garcha has also described her character as "someone who stands for what's right". Upon her character's exit, the actress summarised Ash's personality: "I think she's very headstrong and morally right, but when it comes to family she is there for them".

=== Notable relationships ===
==== Iqra Ahmed ====
Ash and Iqra began their relationship in 2018, but couldn't go public with their relationship due to Iqra being involved in an arranged marriage and Iqra initially not being open about her sexuality. While Iqra expressed interest in meeting Ash's family, Ash gave her few details and kept secretive about them. Garcha explained this to be because: "Ash knows her family aren't going to approve of Iqra so is trying to protect her relationship", adding that Ash was "trying to make Iqra understand without actually saying what the issue is". Ash was said to be "conflicted" about what to do for the best, uncertain about how much she should tell Iqra about her background. Garcha teased the couple's storyline to be "a bit of a rollercoaster", opining that it would be "exciting and interesting" for Ash's brothers to meet Iqra. The actress hoped that Ash and Iqra would enjoy a happy relationship, but acknowledged that "it is EastEnders after all".

After the couple split in early 2021, Garcha admitted feeling mixed emotions regarding the breakup news. She explained that it was because it was her "first relationship storyline" and admitted that she "really loved them together" as "they really worked" and enjoyed receiving supportive messages from fans and viewers. Garcha added that she also really enjoyed working with Davdra and hoped the characters would get back together in the future.

==== Suki Panesar ====
Prior to Suki's arrival, Ash's relationship with her offscreen mother had been described as "turbulent", "torrid", and "strained". As Ash's decision to leave her family was caused by Suki's closed mindset, it was said that Ash "wants nothing to do with her mother", and upon hearing news of her mother suffering from cancer, Ash refused to visit her. When it was announced that Ash's mother Suki Panesar (Balvinder Sopal) would make her first appearance, It was teased that the relationship would become a "central part" of the Panesar's upcoming storylines, and that "a number of secrets from her past" that may come to light sooner rather than later. Sopal explained the relationship as having "a lot of history" and "a few secrets". She opined that Ash and Suki had similarities in their respective personalities, in her words: "the same person", as both are "very strong-minded" and a feud boiled due to similar people often clashing. Sopal added that they also confliced over what was best for Ash, explaining: "Ash knows what she wants, Suki knows what she wants and thinks she knows what Ash needs, and Ash doesn't want that! So, I think there is a conflict of interest there". Garcha illuminated that Ash thinks Suki is "evil" as "if Ash is happy, Suki's not happy" and "Suki has a hold over her" when "Ash wants to be a strong person and the complete opposite of her mum". Despite this, Garcha commented that: "Deep down, [Ash] will always love her family and her mum", describing their dynamic as a "love/hate relationship".

Garcha detailed that "all [Ash] wants deep down is to be loved by her mum, and feel supported", which she doesn't get from Suki, describing their relationship as a "rollercoaster" and "all over the place". Garcha acknowledged that her character was aware that "nothing is out of bounds for Suki", explaining that Ash's mother was "willing to go as far as she can to jeopardise anything that makes Ash happy". Garcha reckoned that Ash and Suki were more similar than it initially seemed, but that her character "hides it but it's there", ignoring it as "she doesn't want to be like Suki". She reckoned that Ash was the only character who could "match" her mother. After Suki began an affair with another woman, Eve Unwin (Heather Peace), Garcha commented that Ash would feel "angry, betrayed and confused" at the news, but that she would sympathise with her mother in the end due to also being part of the LGBT community. She opined that if Ash and Suki had a more honest relationship "it would be beautiful" and they would be a "powerful" duo, as "Ash is more like her mum than she cares to admit".

==== Peter Beale ====
After breaking up with Iqra, Ash and Peter Beale (Dayle Hudson) began a relationship. Garcha explained her character's feelings for Peter as Ash had "fallen for him but she didn't expect to or want to". The actress added that Ash "wanted someone to cheer her up" after her relationship with Iqra ended, choosing Peter. Garcha suggested that Ash "fought" her feelings, but fell for Peter as "he's too much of a charmer, she's given in", resulting in Ash becoming "invested" in him and Garcha noting her hopes that Peter wouldn't "mess her about". Despite Peter cheating on Ash with Suki, Garcha remained hopeful that their romance would survive, opining that it was "really nice" and "evolved quite naturally". She continued that she could see and would love for Ash and Peter go in for "the long haul", explaining: "I think they make a good pair and bring out good qualities in each other. She encourages him to be a good father and hasn't let that be a problem between them, so I'd definitely like to see them in it for the long haul".

==== Harvey Monroe ====
During a storyline depicting Ash's experiences with racism, she would experience it from Harvey Monroe (Ross Boatman). After Ash entered a Harvey's taxi a week after being sick in it, which Garcha described it as "awkward" and "uncomfortable" for Ash, but when she's about to apologise for it, Harvey is unintentionally racist towards her, as Garcha had previously teased: "he says something to her that is offensive and on top of the day she's just had – it really doesn't help". Garcha hoped the interactions would allow viewers the opportunity to see Ash "in a new light", as she would "crack" and have "had enough", which were aspects of her character which were yet to be explored. When asked what she'd tell Ash about dealing with ignorant people, Garcha responded: "Challenge it – have conversations, open and honest and explain why it's hurt you – why it's offensive". Garcha admitted to becoming emotional while reading scripts for the episode, having experienced racial prejudice recently before filming, resulting in the scene being "difficult" for the actress to film.

==== Dotty Cotton ====
During Ash's 2022 departure, Suki grew closer to Dotty Cotton (Milly Zero) after Vinny became a close friend of hers, which Garcha teased could spark a feud between Ash and Dotty. She explained: "Witnessing the relationship Suki and Dotty have formed so easily makes Ash question why it can't be the same for her and her mum". The actress continued by implying Ash was jealous of Dotty and could "see through" her, frustrated at "why the rest of the family cant". She opined that seeing the characters "go head-to-head" would be "really exciting" as "they're both fiery and have a dark side" and both had a close relationship to Vinny, as Garcha explained: "Seeing Vinny stuck in the middle between someone he loves and the sister who's always been there for him would be very interesting".

==== Nish Panesar ====
Prior to his eventual introduction, Garcha expressed enthusiasm for the show to debut Ash's imprisoned father, Nish Panesar (Navin Chowdhry). Unlike Ash's rocky relationship with Suki, Garcha described Ash's relationship with her father as being "close", which she opined would be an "interesting dynamic" when compared to her relationship with her mother. The actress expressed excitement for Ash's father to "come along and complete the family" and teased that she was "sure" that her character's father would appear on screen "in no time". As Nish's release date drew closer, Garcha acknowledged that viewers had recently seen Ash "expressing how she never really got to know her father" and explained that her character "loves her dad" and would be "floored" to be reunited with him. She teased that Nish's arrival would bring "exciting times" for the family: "It's roller-coaster, edge-of-your-seat and emotional stuff". Upon Nish's release, Garcha explained to the Metro that: "For Ash, whenever Nish has been brought up in the past, she has been super protective, so I think that's an insight to how she feels about her dad". She described Ash as "daddy's little princess" and voiced interest in seeing how Ash would react to her father's more deceptive side.

=== Departure (2023) ===
That's a wrap on Ash, for now. It's been an amazing three and a half years here at EastEnders. Thank you so much to all the viewers that have loved Ash and her journey, and all her kind of quirks, the fiery side and soft.

— Garcha's Instagram post bidding farewell to the character and thanking supportive viewers.

On 30 January 2023, it was announced that Ash had been axed from the soap by executive producer Chris Clenshaw after four years. At the time of the announcement, Garcha was still filming. The character's exit storyline was later revealed to be "straightforward" and sources disclosed that Garcha had considered her time on the soap as "incredible", but was "ready to try new things". After Ash's exit in episode 6659, broadcast on 8 March 2023, the soap released a video of Garcha delivering a speech after concluding filming her final scenes. In the speech, Garcha enthused that she "had the best time" on the show, especially as the opportunity arrived when she was reconsidering her career path. She continued that she had "learnt so much" and worked with "the most amazing people" before thanking her co-stars and crew members. Garcha hoped that she could return to the part in the near future, noting "hopefully it's not goodbye forever".

=== Reintroduction (2026) ===
In 2026, it was announced the character would be reintroduced after three years away, with Sakira Vel assuming the role. On taking on the role and making her television debut, Vel said: "When I got the call offering me the role, I don't think I could truly believe it until I finally made it onto the Square! EastEnders is an absolute television icon, and the show was essentially the backdrop to my childhood. Taking on the role of Ash is a real honour and I cannot wait for the audience to see what we have in store as she dives straight into the Panesar family chaos." Whilst executive producer Ben Wadey said: "We're delighted to welcome Ash back to Walford and to have Sakira Vel join the EastEnders cast. With unresolved tensions still simmering between Ash and her family, her unexpected return is set to create new challenges for the Panesar family." Scenes concerning Vel's debut occurred during Episode 7403, broadcast on 21 September 2026.

== Storylines ==
Ash arrives in Walford as the Sikh bisexual girlfriend of Iqra Ahmed (Priya Davdra), being introduced to Iqra's grandparents Arshad (Madhav Sharma) and Mariam (Indira Joshi). Iqra explains that Ash is a doctor. At a nightclub one night, Iqra tells people that they are just friends, upsetting Ash. Iqra kisses Ash in front of all the residents as an apology. Later in the year, Ash is revealed to be a member of the Panesar family, the sister of Kheerat (Jaz Deol), Jags (Amar Adatia), and Vinny Panesar (Shiv Jalota). During a "wife swap" event, Ash is paired with Honey Mitchell (Emma Barton) for several days and soon notices that Honey has bulimia nervosa, and advises her to seek professional help. When Honey disowns her boyfriend Adam Bateman (Stephen Rahman-Hughes), who knew about her eating disorder and showed little concern, Ash and Iqra praise Honey for her newfound courage.

Kheerat, Jags, and Vinny move into a house before Kheerat apologises to Ash for disagreeing with her decision to have an abortion at age 19. However, he is disappointed with Ash after she introduces him to Iqra, as Iqra is Muslim. Later, Ash's mother Suki Panesar (Balvinder Sopal) arrives in Walford claiming to want to repair their relationship, as they had previously cut contact due to Suki's disapproval of Ash's sexual orientation. Suki reveals she is dying from cancer, but Ash realises that Suki is lying. Suki discloses that she lied about it to bring the family closer before Ash's father is released from prison. Ash interprets a comment from Harvey Monroe (Ross Boatman) as racism, and reports him to his employer Kat Slater (Jessie Wallace), who fires him. Ash is harassed by Harvey's son Aaron (Charlie Wernham), who does hold racist views but is convinced to forgive Harvey after his daughter Dana (Barbara Smith) explains that he never thinks before speaking.

Ash begins bonding with Peter Beale (Dayle Hudson), unaware that Peter slept with Suki. When Ash and Iqra break up, she begins a relationship with Peter. The relationship sours after Ash is suspended from her job for supplying medicine to Peter while off-duty and hungover. After Jags is killed in prison, Peter fails to support Ash through her trauma and she breaks up with Peter after catching him sleeping with her mother for the second time. After a brief departure, Suki registers Ash for GP training and sets her up to run a doctor's surgery with Nina Gupta (Hersha Verity), despite Ash enjoying her current position. Suki also buys Ash a car to bribe her, and Ash expresses her frustration and claims Suki has always controlled her, and wouldn't let her visit her father in prison. After Kheerat and Ben Mitchell (Max Bowden) fight, Ash examines Ben before he admits he called off protection for Jags as revenge, which resulted in his death.

Ash is blackmailed by Eve Unwin (Heather Peace) after writing an incorrect prescription for her to return money that her family stole from Jean Slater (Gillian Wright), but she is caught by Kheerat in the act. When Ash's father Nish Panesar (Navin Chowdhry) is released from prison, it is revealed that local resident Ravi Gulati (Aaron Thiara) is her half-brother. Kheerat tells Ash and Vinny that Nish was in prison for murder, causing Ash and Vinny to give Nish the cold shoulder, but they both forgive him after he apologises and explains his side of the story. After Kheerat confesses to the murder of Ranveer Gulati (Anil Goutam), despite Ravi and Nina being responsible and Suki believing it was her, resulting in Kheerat's arrest. Months later, Ash tells Nish that she has been re-offered a job in Canada, and, not wanting her to leave, he orders Suki to convince Ash against going, but, wanting her daughter to see success, Suki baits her into taking the job, pretending to dissuade her. As a result, Ash pursues the job and departs after warning Nish to give Suki more control of their marriage's business empire.

In July 2025, it is revealed that Ash is getting married, but Suki is devastated when Ash doe not invite her to the wedding. Ash returns to Walford in September 2026 after being arrested for public intoxication and disorderly behaviour. She uses Suki's name to have Vinny bail her out. When Ash goes to see Suki, she overhears Suki's harsh words regarding her.

== Reception ==
Johnathon Hughes of Radio Times was unsurprised by the reveal of Ash being a member of the Panesar family, commenting that he had "pretty much guessed it". The company gave Ash and Iqra's relationship the portmanteau "Ashra". Lauren Codling of the Eastern Eye named Ash "a talking point with viewers", despite her recent addition to the soap. Codling explained this was due to Ash starring in "widely praised" Iqra story, which was praised for its "portrayal of a modern-day LGBTQ+ relationship between two women from the British Asian community". Garcha has received many positive messages from fans, who admired the show for spotlighting a common situation realistically. Speaking on the positive reactions, Garcha commented: "It is nice to know when someone can relate to your role and storyline, It is very rewarding as an actor when you feel like you're helping people and then giving them a sense of comfort, so they know they are not alone". Garcha mentioned that "people loved" Ash and Iqra's relationship, and disclosed that she received "messages of support" from viewers who related to Ash, which she commented was "really lovely".

Ash's character generated praise from Inside Soap's Laura-Jayne Tyler, who explained: "The subtle girl power that Ash brings to Walford is so ace that we want to see more, especially if that involves giving her wicked mother, Suki, a run for her money". Garcha was enthusiastic about receiving "really positive" messages from Punjabi Sikh fans who related to Ash, explaining that people were "proud to be represented" and have been supportive of her storylines. Nicole Karageorgi of MyLondon reported positive reactions from viewers towards a scene where Ash punches Nina and quips: "Bitches slap, Panesars punch", with some declaring it the show's "best line of the year [2022]" and others "in stitches" at the quote. Upon her exit announcement, Zara Woodcock of Mirror claimed the character had been a "huge hit with fans" across her stint. Angie Quinn of MyLondon reported that the exit announcement had left fans "heartbroken" as Ash had proved to be an "immediate hit" with viewers. Upon the character's exit, Maisie Spackman of the Metro commented that Ash was "much loved" and reported fans praising Ash's character and wishing Garcha the best.

== See also ==
- List of LGBTQ characters in soap operas
- List of fictional bisexual characters
- List of fictional doctors
