= Guy Oliver-Watts =

English actor and musician

Guy Oliver-Watts is an English actor and musician. He is best known for his performances in the film The Theory of Everything and TV programmes including Victoria and Game of Thrones.

== Career ==
=== 1980s ===
Oliver-Watts began his career as a musician, and in 1980 was one of the lead singers trialled by English pop band Duran Duran in their early years. In 1988, he appeared as a 'young reporter' in the British Television film Across the Lake.

=== 1990s ===
In 1990, Oliver-Watts played the protagonist Craig in the comedy Ladies' Night at the Theatre Royal, Brighton. In 1991, he played Marcus in the British-American film Twenty-One. In 1992, he played Benedick in the fourth series of British mystery drama Agatha Christie's Poirot. In 1993, he appeared in the fourth series of British sitcom The Upper Hand. In the same year, he played the protagonist Joe Soap in the pop musical Hot Stuff at the Cambridge Theatre in the West End. In 1995, he played John Orvel in the second series of British mystery drama Cadfael. In the same year, he played Lightborn in Edward II at the Leicester Haymarket Theatre. In 1996, he played Paul Cranshaw in the third series of British police drama Wycliffe. In the same year, he played Tony Bishop in the fourth series of British police drama Pie in the Sky. Also in the same year, he played Endesleigh in the British crime drama Sharman. In 1999, he played Guy in British TV film Hunting Venus.

=== 2000s ===
In 2000, Oliver-Watts voiced Harry in the BAFTA-nominated animated short Six of One. In the same year, he played Kevin North in the seventeenth series of British police drama The Bill. In 2003, he again appeared in The Bill, this time playing Mark Jordan in its nineteenth series. In the same year, he played Algernon Moncrieff in Aquila Theatre's production of The Importance of Being Earnest at Baruch College in New York. He then played both Puck and Egeus in A Midsummer Night's Dream on a theatrical tour with Aquila which included Chicago and Colorado. In 2006, he played a pathologist in the British film Provoked. In 2008, he played Charles Dickens in the British documentary drama Passage. In 2009, he voiced Helghast in Sony computer game Killzone 2.

=== 2010s ===
In 2011, Oliver-Watts again voiced Helghast in the sequel to Killzone 2, Killzone 3. In the same year, he played Carl in the British short film Unwatchable. In 2013, he appeared as Miles in British soap opera Emmerdale. In 2014, he played George Wilde in the Oscar-nominated British drama film The Theory of Everything. In the same year, he played Nick Terrigan in the sixteenth series of British medical soap opera Doctors. In 2016, he played Sir James Hayter in the first series of British historical drama Victoria. In the same year, he played Brigadier Baxter in the second series of British war drama Our Girl. Also in 2016, he played 'Father' in the British short film The Border. He played a Lannister general in Game of Thrones. In 2019, he played recurring character Sobell in the BBC drama series Summer of Rockets.

=== 2020s ===
In 2023, Oliver-Watts played Ben Ingham in Disney+'s The Lions of Sicily. In 2024, he appeared in the short film Document 56.

== Personal life ==
Oliver-Watts plays cricket for Westfield Cricket Club in Surrey.
