= Toby-Alexander Smith =

English actor (born 1991)

- Smith in 2025
- Born: 26 February 1991 (age 35); Lichfield, Staffordshire, England
- Education: Arts Educational Schools
- Occupation: Actor
- Years active: 2016–present
- Spouse: Amy Walsh (m. 2023)
- Children: 2
- Family: Kimberley Walsh (sister-in-law)

Toby-Alexander Smith (born 26 February 1991) is an English actor, known for playing Gray Atkins in the BBC soap opera EastEnders (2019–2022, 2026).

== Early life ==
Smith was born on 26 February 1991 in Lichfield, Staffordshire, and developed a passion for acting whilst at school. He went to Arts Educational Schools in London, where he trained as an actor.

== Career ==
His first television appearance was in an episode of the American Epix drama series Berlin Station in 2016. He then appeared in the BBC soap opera Doctors as Jason Carswell. In 2019, Smith appeared as Terry in the series Flack and later in the DC universe's Krypton as Lo-Ran.

On 11 March 2019, it was announced that Smith had joined the cast of EastEnders as Gray Atkins, the husband of Chantelle Atkins, played by Jessica Plummer. His first appearance was in the episode broadcast on 29 March 2019. In episodes broadcast in July 2019, it is revealed that Smith's character Gray has been domestically abusing his wife Chantelle. Smith alongside Plummer and the EastEnders team, worked closely with Women's Aid and Refuge to ensure that the domestic abuse storyline had been told accurately. Commenting on the storyline, Smith said: "I just hope that anyone experiencing any sort of behaviour like that will talk about it and relate to it. I've already been told by Woman's Aid that people have contacted them and said they think their friend is in a similar situation to Gray and Chantelle in EastEnders." This led to Smith becoming an ambassador for Women's Aid. In September 2020, the storyline ended with Gray murdering Chantelle. In February 2022, it was announced that Smith would be leaving the series, and his character departed in March 2022. For their portrayal of domestic violence, Smith and Plummer were nominated for a BAFTA award in 2021, and Smith was also shortlisted for "Best Villain" at the Inside Soap Awards in 2020 and longlisted in 2021. In May 2026, it was announced that Smith would be reprising his role as Gray for a short stint.

== Personal life ==
Smith began a relationship with Emmerdale actress Amy Walsh in 2020, having met in the Strictly Come Dancing audience in 2019. They had their first daughter in 2021. The couple live in east London. Smith married Walsh in September 2023. His friend and former EastEnders co-star Shona McGarty, performed a song at the wedding. They had their second daughter in March 2026.

In 2025, Smith and Walsh launched the Walsh Academy North, a drama school for kids aged 7 to 16, opened in June 2025, with both actors serving as coaches to train fresh talent. They expanded on their existing drama school, the Walsh Academy, to offer speech and drama classes, aiming to build confidence and creativity.

== Filmography ==
| Year | Title | Role | Notes |
|---|---|---|---|
| 2016 | Berlin Station | George | Episode: "Station to Station" |
| 2018 | Doctors | Jason Carswell | Episode: "The Beautiful Game" |
| 2019 | Flack | Terry | Episode: "Patrick" |
| 2019–2022, 2026 | EastEnders | Gray Atkins | Regular role; 276 episodes |
| 2019 | Krypton | Lor-Ran | Episode: "Ghost in the Fire" |
| 2020 | EastEnders: Secrets from the Square | Himself | Episode: "Karen, Chantelle and Gray" |
| 2020–2022 | Loose Women | Himself | 3 episodes |
| 2022 | The One Show | Himself | 1 episode |
| 2024 | An American in Austen | Charles Bingley | TV movie |
| 2024 | Love Across Time | Charles Barkley V | TV movie |
| 2025 | Finding Calm | Sam | Short film |
| 2025 | A Murder Between Friends | Sydney | Film |
| 2026 | Seeking Persephone | Harry Windover | 4 episodes |

== Awards and nominations ==
| Year | Award | Category | Result | Ref. |
|---|---|---|---|---|
| 2019 | I Talk Telly Awards | Best Soap Newcomer | Nominated | |
| 2020 | I Talk Telly Awards | Best Soap Partnership (shared with Jessica Plummer) | Nominated | |
| 2020 | Inside Soap Awards | Best Villain | Shortlisted | |
| 2021 | Version Soap Awards | Best Villain | Won | |
| 2021 | British Academy Television Awards | Must-See Moment | Nominated | |
| 2021 | Inside Soap Awards | Best Villain | Nominated | |
| 2022 | The British Soap Awards | Villain of the Year | Nominated | |
| 2022 | Inside Soap Awards | Best Villain | Nominated | |
