= Suki Panesar =

Fictional character from EastEnders

- EastEnders character
- Portrayed by: Balvinder Sopal
- Duration: 2020–present
- First appearance: Episode 6069; 27 January 2020
- Introduced by: Jon Sen
- Spin-off appearances: TV Soundtracks EastEnders: The Six (2023)
In-universe information
- Other names: Suki Kaur; Suki Panesar-Unwin
- Occupation: Businesswoman
- Family: Panesar
- Spouse: Nish Panesar (until 2024); Eve Unwin (2025–present)
- Sons: Kheerat Panesar; Jags Panesar; Vinny Panesar
- Daughters: Ash Panesar
- Adoptive daughters: Ria Virdi (foster)
- Stepsons: Ravi Gulati
- Grandsons: Tyrion Ahmed

Suki Panesar (also Kaur and Panesar-Unwin) is a fictional character from the BBC soap opera EastEnders, played by Balvinder Sopal. Sopal's casting and details about Suki were announced in December 2019, with the character making her first onscreen appearance on 27 January 2020. She was portrayed as the protective mother of Kheerat (Jaz Deol), Jags (Amar Adatia), Vinny (Shiv Jalota) and Ash Panesar (Gurlaine Kaur Garcha) who believe that she always has the right answer. Prior to her arrival, it is confirmed that her relationship with Ash is severed due to disagreeing with her bisexuality. Her initial storyline sees her lying about having cancer to garner sympathy and get closer to her children. She was immediately well received by viewers and critics, with Inside Soap writing that Suki had reached "soap icon status in record time". Sopal was shocked by the praise that she and Suki had received from the beginning of her tenure.

Over her tenure, Suki was developed from an antagonist into a character with some vulnerability. This begins with Suki being affected by racial abuse graffitied over her shop due to believing she had become ingrained into Walford. Suki then frames her son Jags for crimes that other son Vinny was responsible for; Jags later gets murdered in prison. The story explores Suki's guilt over what she has done and Honey Mitchell (Emma Barton) becomes a key source of support for Suki. She tries to kiss Honey and it transpires that Suki has an attraction to women, which gives an understanding of her homophobic treatment towards Ash. Her various feuds have also been a focal point for the character, with Suki's rivalries including the entire Mitchell and Slater family units.

Suki is later given a long-term love interest in Eve Unwin (Heather Peace), and they embark on a secret affair. The on-off relationship has been told through a 'slow burn' approach to respect the reality of both the LGBTQ+ and the South Asian communities. Writers then introduced Suki's abusive husband, Nish (Navin Chowdhry), who is released from prison after he murdered Suki's friend. The storyline sees Suki coercively controlled by Nish, and despite not being scared of him, she is worried about what he could do throughout the storyline. Suki finally leaves Nish for Eve and helps to cover Nish's attack and the murder of Keanu Taylor (Danny Walters) during "the Six" storyline. For the whole of 2024, Nish plots revenge on Suki for leaving him and covering his attack, which culminates during Suki and Eve’s wedding on New Year’s Day 2025, when Nish dies after being pushed off the hotel roof by his illegitimate son Ravi Gulati (Aaron Thiara), dragging Suki with him. In July 2025, Suki and Ash's stormy relationship is revisited when Ash plans to get married without telling Suki. Meanwhile, Suki's step-granddaughter Avani Nandra-Hart (Aaliyah James) discovers she is pregnant. Seeing an opportunity, Suki manipulates Avani into keeping the baby so she can adopt the child herself, giving her another chance at motherhood. After Avani has an abortion, Suki and Eve explore adoption and begin fostering a young girl named Ria Virdi (Aaria Sharma).

Sopal's acting abilities have been praised throughout her tenure and she has received various awards and nominations for her portrayal. Suki and Eve's relationship, dubbed "SukEve", has also been well received by the LGBTQ+ community, with Diva magazine praising the representation it depicted.

== Casting and characterisation ==
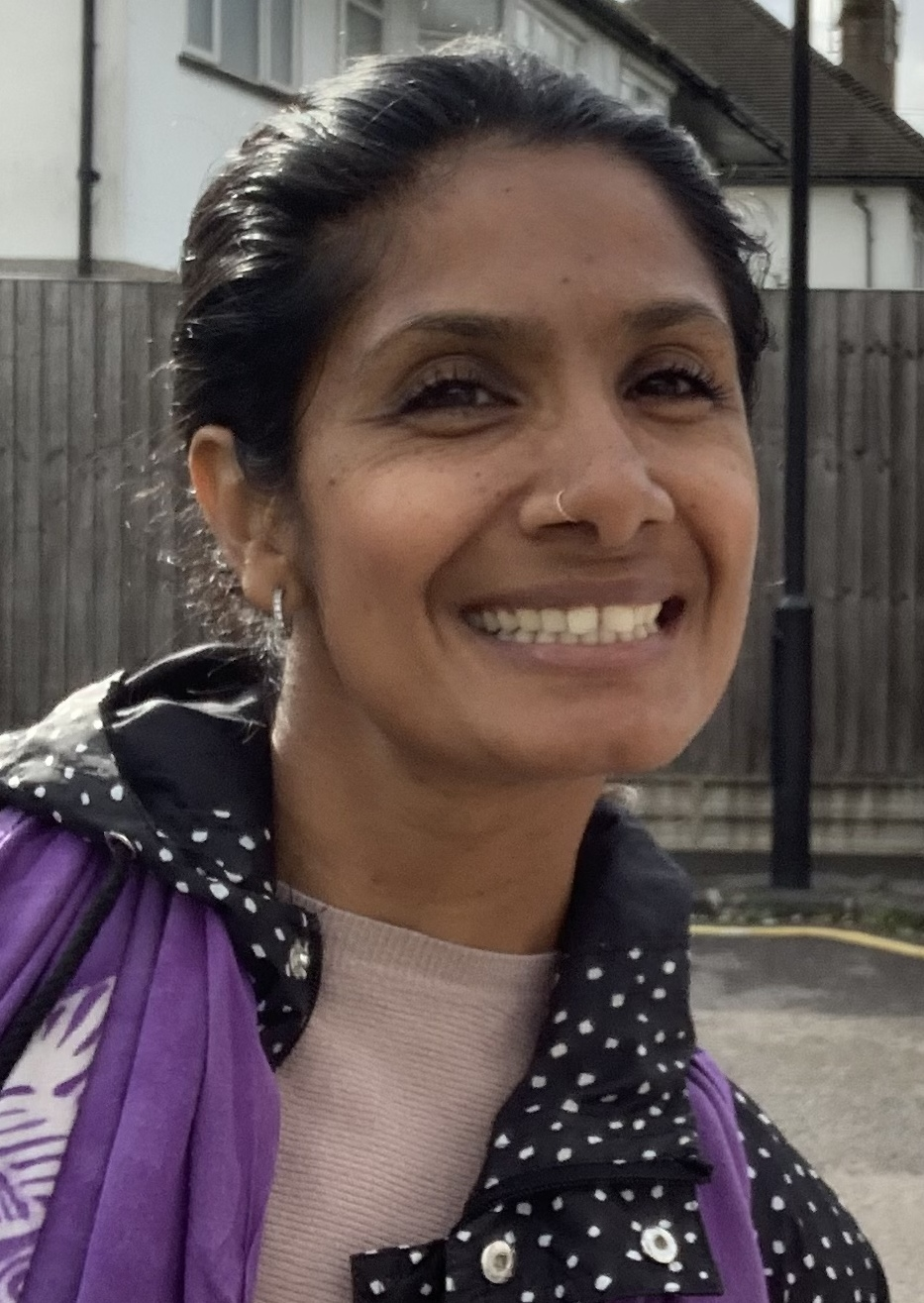
Sopal prefers playing Suki's bitchy side

Prior to Suki being announced, she was referenced onscreen by her children, Kheerat (Jaz Deol), Jags (Amar Adatia), Vinny (Shiv Jalota) and Ash (Gurlaine Kaur Garcha). A few months after their arrivals on EastEnders, it was confirmed that their mother would be joining the programme and that Balvinder Sopal had been cast in the role. Executive producer Jon Sen liked the "unique blend of steeliness and charm" that she brought to the role. Sopal grew up watching the soap and was "pinching [her]self" to have been cast on it. She was also impressed that EastEnders were looking to introduce a modern Punjabi woman with an unwavering and uncompromising attitude. She also appreciated that Suki is a character who creates drama rather than reacting to it.

Suki is a character who is "set to cause chaos" from her introduction. Sen made it clear that as soon as her children were introduced, they were shown to be living under their mother's shadow. He billed her as an overbearing matriarch and someone who is determined to have an impact wherever she goes. She enjoys attention, is fiercely protective of her family and is able to easily draw people in. The BBC noted that Suki "always knows best and she is not one to be reckoned with." Sopal also billed Suki as someone who "puts an idea into your head and lets the seed grow, as if you came up with it". Over time, after writers had "slowly unveiled layers" to Suki, Sopal said that although she enjoyed vulnerable scenes, she preferred playing Suki's bitchy moments. She explained: "I've always played downtrodden, you know, submissive women, so to be out there and sort of the female version of Phil Mitchell, I think is great." A key part of Suki's look is her beehive hairstyle, which she is seen wearing in most scenes.

== Development ==
=== Cancer lie and getting Jags arrested ===
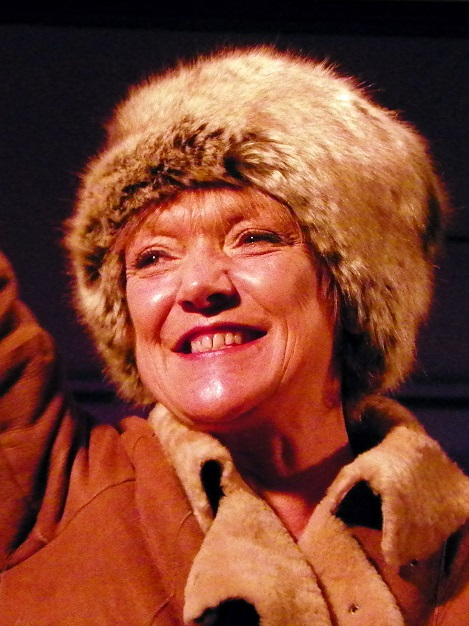
Suki uses Jean Slater's (Gillian Wright, pictured) cancer experience to make her lie seem believable.

Suki's "torrid" relationship with Ash was hinted at prior to Suki's arrival and it was confirmed that their dynamic would be a central part of the Panesars' initial storylines. Sopal explained that their strained relationship comes as a result of the pair being similar in that they are both strong-minded women who want different things. When she arrives in Walford, Ash describes Suki as "a nasty, evil, lying narcissist who wraps everyone around her little finger" to girlfriend Iqra Ahmed (Priya Davdra). Suki arrives claiming to have cancer and wanting to make up with Ash, telling her that she does not want to die with her only daughter hating her. It transpires that their issues arose due to Suki disapproving of Ash being bisexual. Suki befriends Jean Slater (Gillian Wright), who is undergoing chemotherapy for ovarian cancer, and recites information about Jean's cancer to pass off as her own. Suki's "conniving streak" soon makes Ash realise that Suki is faking having cancer, who eventually admits that she faked it to bring her feuding family back together before their father is released from prison. Shiv Jalota, who plays Vinny, warned that despite Suki's cancer lie being dark, she would become darker. Suki sets up businesses in Walford, in which she hires her children to work for her. One scheme involves getting gambling addict Kush Kazemi (Davood Ghadami) to gamble the Slater family home in a game that she cheats in, winning the home and becoming their landlord. Jags becomes a rent collector for properties that Suki buys and rents out. She gets Jags to be ruthless with tenants who are late with their payments, which his secret girlfriend, Habiba Ahmed (Rukku Nahar), disapproves of. She tells him that if he does not stand up to Suki and become nicer, she does not want a relationship. He refuses to be ruthless, after which Suki's "true colours" show in part of a revenge plan for Jags crossing her. Vinny attacks Martin Fowler (James Bye), and as Jags is around, he gets blood on his jeans. When Jags tells his family about his relationship with Habiba, Suki appears to be supportive. However, moments later, a "seething" Suki turns Jags in to the police, giving them the jeans and claiming that he attacked Martin.

Sopal got goose bumps filming the "evil" scenes and was excited by playing such a villainous character. She was shocked that her character could turn her own son in to the police and likened Suki to the Godfather. Explaining Suki's actions against her own son, Sopal said that Suki sees Jags' standing up to her as a "how dare you moment". She sees the prison set-up as a way of teaching Jags a lesson, as well as ruining his relationship with Habiba, since it feels like he is focusing on her rather than their family. Sopal also noted that in Suki's own twisted way, she sees prison as a form of protection for Jags, since she knows where he is and that he is being watched. When asked if Suki regrets her actions, Sopal said: "I don't think she likes what she has to do but she wants everyone to understand the roles they play in the family. So Jags goes along with it, he tells the police he did it and that's that. So in her mind, he learns his lesson – to do what he's told!"

=== Feud with the Mitchells and ruining Ash's relationship ===
In December 2020, Suki embarks on a feud with the Mitchell family. The storyline begins with her blackmailing Ben Mitchell (Max Bowden) over CCTV footage from her shop that incriminates him for an attack on Ian Beale (Adam Woodyatt). She demands £10,000 to keep silent. Once Ben's father Phil Mitchell (Steve McFadden) learns of her blackmailing, he arrives at her pest control business office with a bat, destroying property and threatening to hit Suki. However, Suki continues to anger the Mitchells and receives a warning from Phil to stop meddling. Digital Spy noted that due to her "interfering ways", she would be likely to not listen, while the Metro wrote that a war between the Panesars and the Mitchells would ensue.

After a bad day, Suki finds Peter Beale's (Dayle Hudson) wallet in her house, left over from a party. He returns to collect it and Suki pulls out a condom from his wallet, flirting with him. The two have sex, despite Peter being attracted to her daughter, Ash. Ash and Peter eventually begin a relationship, and as she did with Jags and Habiba, Suki plots to ruin them. Sopal said: "in typical Suki style she wants all her children for herself". Suki feels that Ash should be focusing on her nursing career and her family rather than a relationship. She soon uses the hook-up she had with Peter to impact their relationship. Sopal remarked: "she is the destroyer. She likes to destroy things. She can't help herself, she's that kind of character. There's something in her that needs to be at the focus of controversy and also it's a way of keeping some control over her kids."

Suki is further enraged at Ash and Peter's relationship when Ash gets suspended from her nursing job due to administering Peter pain medication whilst hungover and off-shift. As she has tried to cultivate a family where they can all confide in each other and sort out issues together, she is mad when Ash confides in Peter over her. Sopal said what "burned Suki" was Ash confiding in the person who caused the suspension over her own mother. She takes it on herself to go into Ash's work and threaten her boss, which causes further upset between Suki and Ash.

=== Target of racism and Jags' death ===
In March 2021, viewers see a different side to Suki when she is the victim of racism. Her shop, the Minute Mart, is graffitied with racial abuse, which sees Suki suffer from painful memories from her past. Suki had built her family and professional life up and trampled over anybody to get to her point of success because she felt she had to, so the abuse takes her back to the start. The scenes have a noticeable impact on Suki, who is reminded that despite how much she engrains herself into the community, moments like this can ostracise her. The abuse "opens up a whole lot of wounds for her" and makes Suki more of a well-rounded character, with vulnerable scenes that Sopal had not played prior. She was happy to be playing a more sensitive side to Suki as it allowed people to see why Suki is the way she is, having built "up this wall around herself".

After a small break from Walford following the abuse, Suki returns desperate for a large sum of money. She learns that Kheerat is in a relationship, but atypically for Suki, she does not try to ruin it as she is focused on getting money. Ben sees Kheerat with Sharon Watts (Letitia Dean), and realising they are in a relationship, he is horrified. He calls off the protection he had placed on Jags in a deal struck with Kheerat and Jags is soon murdered. Sopal admitted that Suki is responsible for Jags death due to having him framed. However, Suki blames everyone else as she does not know how to process what she has done. Suki "hates herself for doing it, but her only way to control her feelings is to lash out at everybody else and blame the rest of the world for her shortfall". The scenes see Suki become broken as she never believed one of her children would die, especially at the hands of her, since she tries to protect them so much. Sopal hoped that the story would see Suki become softer, but not weaker, and to go through the healing process.

Speaking about the Panesar family's grief storyline, she commended the production team as they allowed the Panesar cast members more time to process the scripts. This was so that they could spend more time finding the emotions surrounding grief. Sopal did not eat on the day of receiving her script so that she could feel the emptiness of grief and translate it into her acting. EastEnders featured the Sikh mourning style for the storyline, which involved stripping the furniture back, having white sheets laid out and bringing a Gyani in. It hit the whole team emotionally, including Sopal, who said it felt like real grief that exhausted her after filming the scenes. She was thankful to the producers for showing the traditional Sikh mourning process, since it is rarely shown on television dramas. She said: "when it's embedded in a story and not just shown in a documentary-style programme, you see it for what it really is."

The grief storyline sees the Panesar siblings support each other but not Suki. Since they do not understand each other, Suki becomes distanced from her children. However, Sopal admitted that this is her character's fault. Suki had not created an environment where the children could support her because when they try, she shuts them down. The siblings also unite over their blame of Suki for what has happened to Jags, despite not vocalising it. Suki has "literally nobody" to support her and she soon pushes herself away deliberately as she feels the guilt over her actions.

=== Connection with Honey Mitchell ===
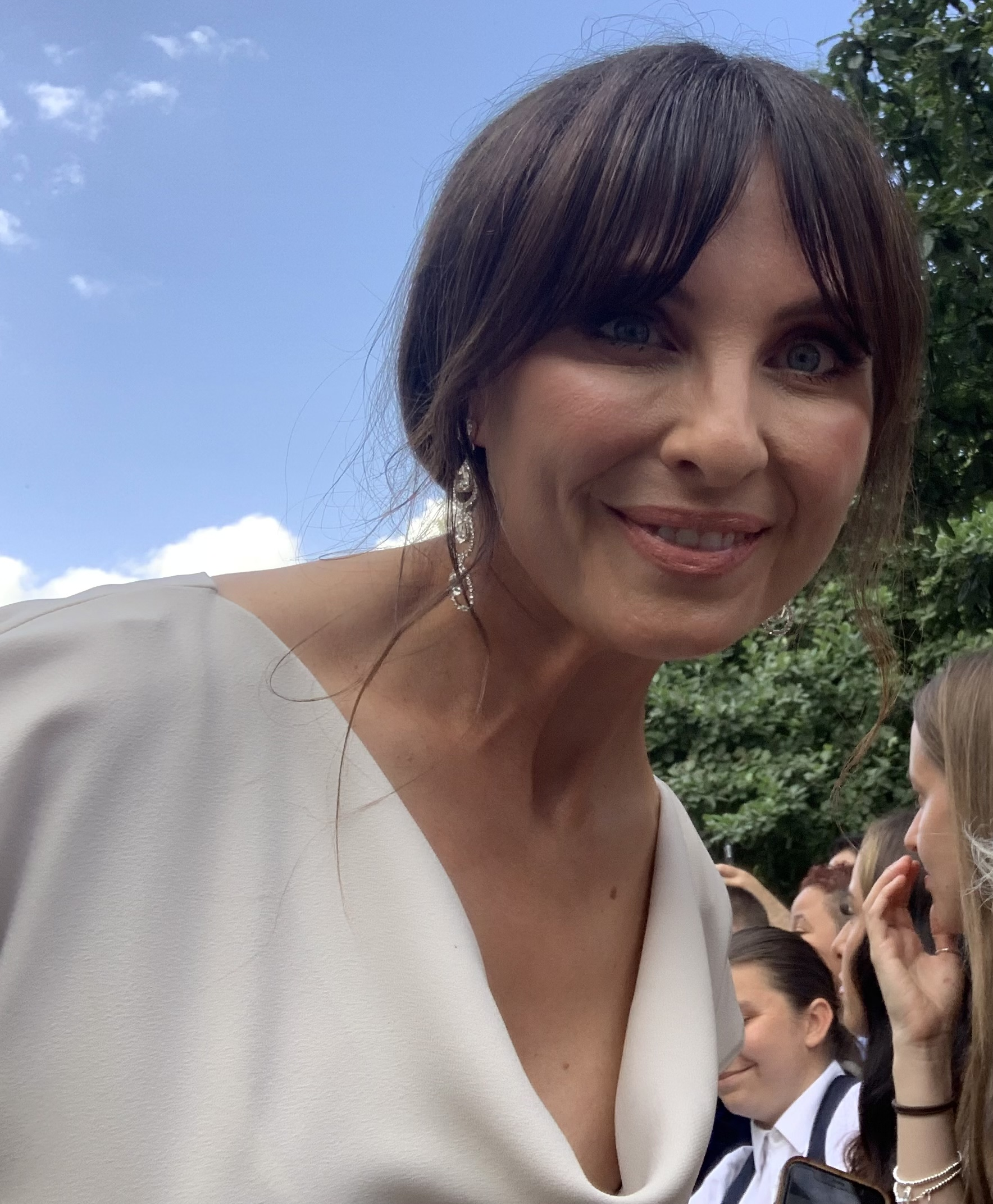
Emma Barton portrayed Suki's first love interest, Honey Mitchell.

As she continues to grieve for weeks, Minute Mart co-worker Honey Mitchell (Emma Barton) becomes "an unlikely source of support for Suki". Honey, who had an eating disorder storyline, notices that Suki is not eating as a punishment to herself. She becomes friends with Suki, which sees her "ice maiden act thaw". Their friendship is temporarily halted when Suki overhears Honey talking about Suki to Kim Fox (Tameka Empson) in the Minute Mart, which leads to Suki ruthlessly throwing out Jags' belongings. Honey finds her and reels when Suki confesses her part in setting Jags up, but continues to support her. Barton explained: "She's full of forgiveness and compassion, she can't punish Suki for what she's done, Suki's punishing herself. She's not saying that she agrees or condones anything she's done, but she knows that's for Suki to deal with".

Sopal was glad to be given a character like Honey for Suki to appear alongside. She joked that it was nice to play something other than an "ice queen". She found it "interesting to see Suki warm up and melt in the company of Honey, which is nice and feels lovely". Barton felt similarly about the new pairing and was excited for the storyline since she loved Suki. Ash interrupts a nice evening that Suki and Honey are sharing, blaming Suki for failing her performance review due to Suki previously threatening her boss. Suki makes a grand gesture to win Ash back over by affirming that she will buy a property to turn into a doctor's surgery that Ash can work at. Ash is angered by Suki's plans, until Honey defends Suki and makes Ash see another viewpoint.

Fans began noticing a connection between Suki and Honey that seemed more than friendship. Barton felt that both Suki and Honey felt an obsession with the other: "Honey was obsessed with cheering Suki up and seeing things the way Honey sees them. Suki then didn't necessarily realise that she was starting to fall in love with the person in front of her." Days later, when Honey is comforting Suki, she tries to kiss Honey, who pulls away. Honey insists it is fine but Suki throws her out and fights back tears. After Honey fails to reciprocate Suki's kiss, Suki begins acting in a standoffish way against her at work. She leaves Honey dumbfounded by pretending the kiss never happened, while giving her a hard time, which leads Honey to call out the workplace bullying. Honey soon tells Kheerat about the kiss, but after needing annual leave from the Minute Mart, Suki tells Honey that she will only honour it if she tells Kheerat it was a lie. Honey complies, but Suki soon "showed how manipulative she can be" by firing Honey, claiming publicly that she cannot employ a liar in the business.

=== Feud with the Slaters and meeting Eve Unwin ===
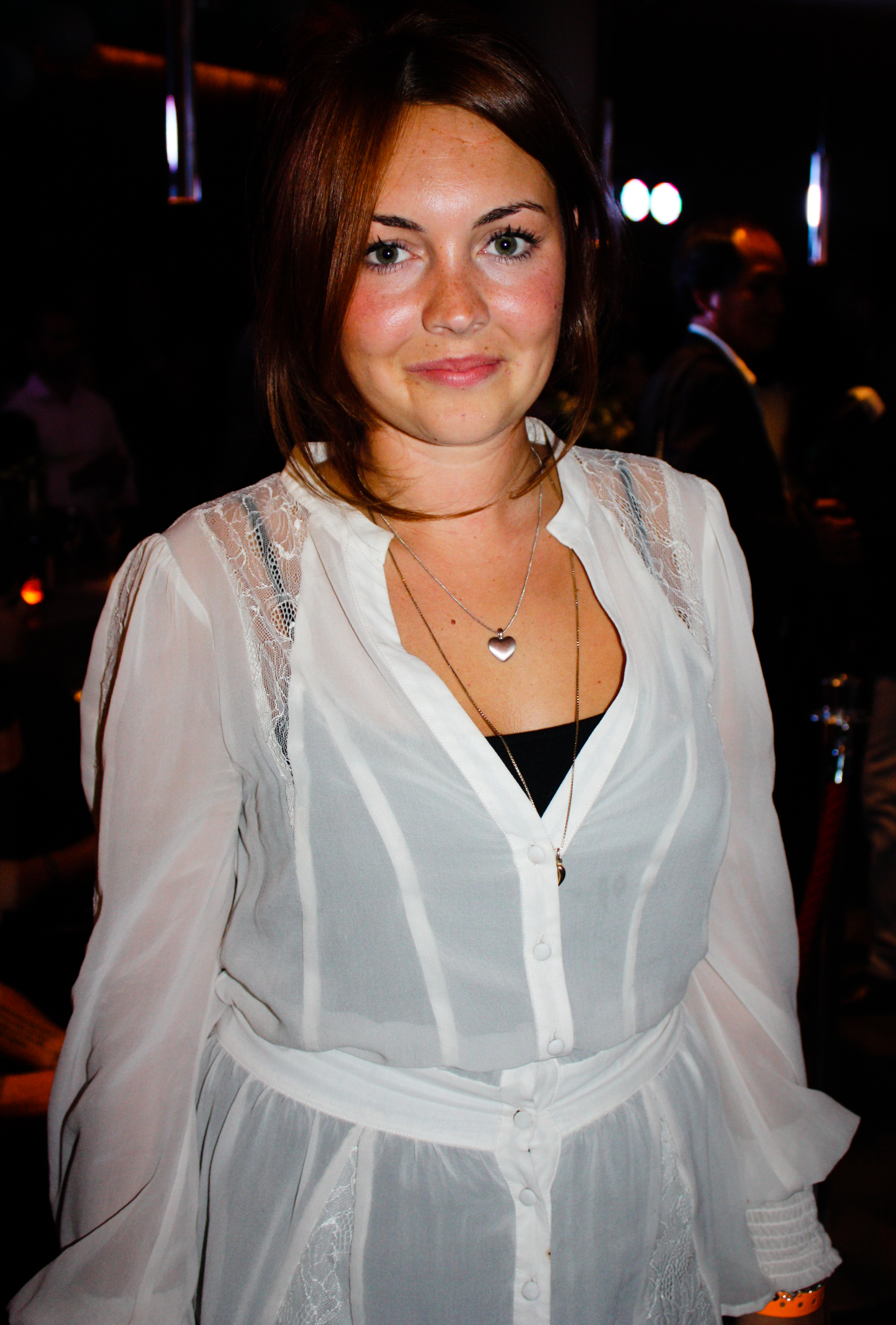
Lacey Turner's character, Stacey Slater, became a sparring partner for Suki in 2021.

Still landlord of the Slater home, Suki begins a feud with Stacey Slater (Lacey Turner) after Stacey is released from prison. At the time of her return, she refuses to fix their boiler and tries to evict them numerous times, which results in the Slaters breaking into Suki's apartment to shower. Suki then "unleashes her wrath" by interrupting Stacey's meeting with her probation officer to accuse her of stealing. Suki then meets Stacey's best friend, Eve Unwin (Heather Peace), who has solicitor knowledge and knows Suki has been trying to evict the Slaters. She then develops a plan to send Eve back to prison.

At the end of 2021, Suki confesses to Honey about her attraction to women. It is hard for Suki to do since she is admitting something about herself that she has pushed down for a long time. Sopal noted that Suki has "four walls built up and that's how she operates", so to be vulnerable and open with Honey is a big thing for Suki. However, Suki regresses by having sex with Peter again. She does it in attempt to prove to herself that she is attracted to men, as well as wanting to regain control and power, but deep down knows that she is wrong to do it. Sopal felt sorry for Suki in the aftermath of the scenes. She explained: "she's battling with so many feelings and emotions. She doesn't have the tools to just let go. She doesn't even know how to say sorry. She doesn't know how to open up a conversation and tell someone how she’s feeling."

After talking with Eve, Ash decides to leave Walford due to wanting to get away from Suki. Eve informs Suki that she has been in contact with Ash since her departure, which leads Suki to lash out at Eve. Unable to "own up to any responsibility herself", Suki blames Eve for Ash leaving and the pair have a showdown that leads to them both getting arrested. The pair are forced to be in a tight space together when they are both held in a police van, before being eventually let go. Suki further feuds with Stacey and Eve when the pair set up a food van which they park in front of Suki's shop. Suki lashes out as Honey, who is now the market inspector following being fired by Suki, and demands she takes action on them otherwise she will file a complaint.

=== Relationship with Eve and involvement with the Gulatis ===
In mid-2022, Suki grows closer to Eve. She then learns that her husband is being released from prison after 20 years. Little had been referenced regarding Suki's husband prior to the scenes; it was then revealed that he was in prison for murder. Eve picks up on Suki's fears regarding his release and gets her to open up. She reveals to Eve that he was controlling and emotionally abusive. She recounts stories of how he would humiliate her and decide where she went with whom. Eve later tries to kiss Suki but she slaps Eve due to her internalised homophobia. Weeks later, in a moment that "fans had been waiting for", the two share a passionate kiss. Digital Spy's Justin Harp confirmed that this was the beginning of a secret romance arc for the pair. They were soon given the portmanteau 'Sukeve'.

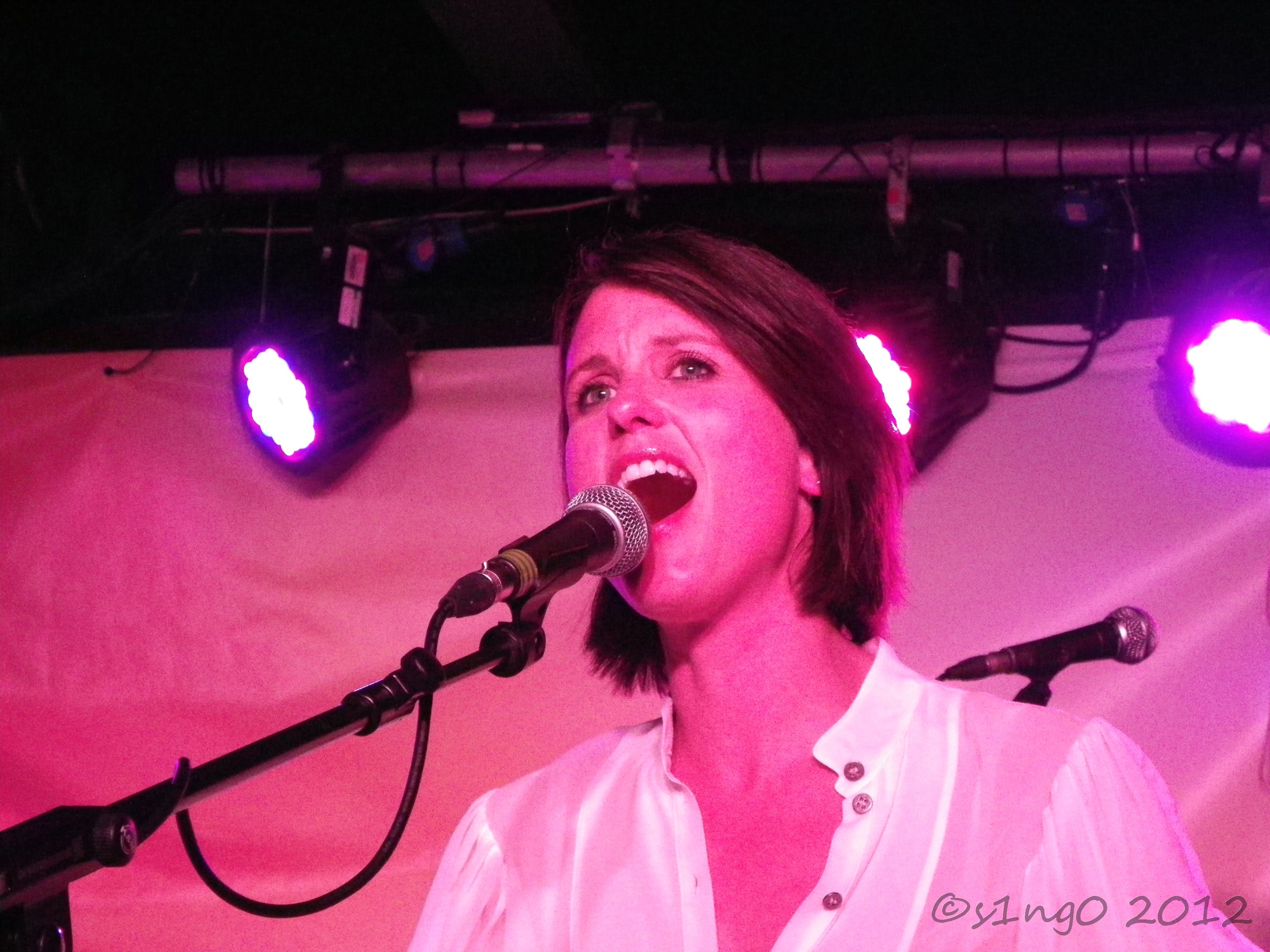
Suki overcomes her internalised homophobia to secretly date love interest Eve Unwin (Heather Peace, pictured).

Following being isolated from her children, Suki's problems get worse in a "life-changing new story". She meets with family friend Ranveer Gulati (Anil Goutam) to discuss a business contract. He informs Suki that if she has sex with him, he will sign the contract. She traps him in her apartment and films him stating this to blackmail him, but he attacks Suki and tries to rape her. She clobbers him over the head with a clock in self-defence, when she is found by Ravi Gulati (Aaron Thiara). Ravi soon realises that Ranveer is not dead and kills him. However, he deceives Suki by allowing her to think she has murdered him, putting on a sympathetic act and promising to keep quiet. He also edits the footage caught on her camera to make it look like she committed the murder. Suki's mental health rapidly deteriorates over the guilt of thinking she has killed Ranveer. Eve soon finds her wandering through Walford in her nightdress and knows that something is wrong. Suki then recounts the events to Eve.

Suki and Eve's relationship faces more tribulations when Stacey sets Eve up on a date with another woman, as well as Suki's issues with committing to a public relationship with a woman. Sopal enjoyed that the writers were taking a "slow burn" approach towards their relationship as she felt it gave the soap a plot to gradually work towards. She found it exciting to keep the audience hanging on for more, but also acknowledged that they wanted to depict a sensitive and accurate story for both the LGBTQ+ and Southeast Asian communities. She added: "things that are worth holding on to take a long time to unravel." Seeing Eve on a date with someone else "pinches" Suki, but makes it easier for Suki to dislike Eve, believe that they are over and gives her a valid reason to shut Eve out. However, Eve goes to support Suki when she is scared about her husband being released from prison soon. Once the two are alone together, they admit their feelings for one another and kiss again in scenes that become "a turning point for the couple".

=== Arrival of abusive husband and continued affair ===
In August 2022, it was announced that Navin Chowdhry had been cast as Nish Panesar, Suki's abusive husband. Metro writer Duncan Lindsay noted that upon his arrival, viewers would see how his sinister treatment of Suki would explain her aggressive behaviours seen on-screen. In October 2022, in scenes gearing up towards his arrival, Kheerat discovers her affair with Eve and is shocked due to her judgement of Ash's sexuality. Sopal said that she would want Ash to return, even for a brief stint, if Suki's sexuality was to become public knowledge since it would develop their relationship. She said that it would help Ash to realise why Suki had treated her how she had. Suki tells Kheerat about Nish's abuse of her and it transpires that he went to prison for murdering one of Suki's platonic male friends out of paranoia that they were having an affair. Suki then leaves Walford as part of a temporary break for Sopal.

When she returns, Nish is there and has settled into Walford. After words of encouragement from Kheerat, Suki decides she wants to be with Eve and put Nish in his place. However, he immediately begins coercively controlling Suki and manipulates her into giving up sole control of the business she has built on her own. Suki is not afraid of anyone including Nish, but is afraid of what he could do to her. She soon turns Eve away, sacrificing "true love for toxic marriage". However, at an award show where Sopal and Peace spoke together about their storyline, they confirmed that more romance was to come for Suki and Eve. The two actresses recalled that they had always told the producers that they wanted it to be a love story instead of a sexual affair and were happy that they obliged. Sopal billed it "two people connecting and finding each other and themselves, rather than a quick slapdash romance" and confirmed that they would reconcile. Eve then begins working for Nish as a way to remain close to Suki. Nish plots to oust Suki from sole ownership of the Panesar businesses and draws up a contract for her to sign assets over to Vinny. After Suki rejects Eve once more, Eve lies about the contracts' intentions and gets her to sign them in a "shock betrayal".

However, Suki and Eve soon continue their affair whilst Nish manipulates Suki into having a marriage blessing ceremony. Suki does not want to have the ceremony, as confirmed by Sopal, but feels a responsibility to continue due to talking about it in public. However, Nish's control over Suki makes her feel obliged to do it. Sopal described his control as "horrible" and noted how Suki's love for Nish had died long ago. She likened Nish's love for Suki as "a love that comes with conditions, control and driven by his needs, wants and passions". Despite partaking in the ceremony, she tells Eve on the day that she is all she needs and that she loves her. Sopal hinted that "a lot of twists and turns" were to come in the story and accredited this to Suki's unpredictability as a character.

=== The Six and Vinny discovering her affair ===
In February 2023, Suki was one of six women featured in a flashforward scene detailing events of Christmas 2023. The scene details Suki, Stacey, Sharon, Kathy Beale (Gillian Taylforth), Linda Carter (Kellie Bright) and Denise Fox (Diane Parish) coming together for a lock-in at the Queen Victoria which takes a turn when a mystery man is seen dead on the floor. It was confirmed that details surrounding his identity, death and the murderer would transpire during Christmas 2023. The story has been billed as "The Six". Sopal was excited but confused when she was told about the story due to the vagueness of it, but felt thrilled by the mystery surrounding it. She described her Six co-stars as legends and felt it "a real honour and privilege" to work alongside them on such a high-coverage storyline.

In April 2023, Kheerat is trialled and sentenced for the murder of Ranveer after he takes the blame for Suki. She soon learns that Nish has a memory stick with the edited footage of Suki and Ranveer, which he keeps as blackmail material to keep her in their marriage. When Suki and Eve are kissing, Nish unexpectedly arrives home and Eve hides in the cupboard, where she overhears Nish discussing details of a shady deal. She then tells Suki that she has an idea to turn Nish in, which they go through with and plot to leave Walford together, but Vinny gets the blame. Suki comes clean and tells Nish that she called the police and that their marriage is over. She is later found collapsed and unconscious at the bottom of the stairs. Vinny then discovers the affair and she promises to stop seeing Eve. However, despite it seeming as though "all hope is lost for the would-be couple", Peace gave fans of the couple hope. She said that despite the breakup, it was not a final breakup, and that if they are "in the same square, they're always going to fall back to each other".

After suspecting that they are continuing their affair, Vinny attempts to kill Eve, which Suki enrages at and promises that she is done with Eve. However, at the TRIC Awards, Sopal hinted that they would eventually be back together. After being asked when, she joked: "how long is a piece of string?" but said that the wait would be worth it. Suki interacts with fellow Six member Kathy when Nish cons her and Tom "Rocky" Cotton (Brian Conley) out of their honeymoon holiday; Suki plots with Kathy to give her the honeymoon back from Nish. Suki soon begins to feel ill and it is noticed by Eve, who catches her when she almost collapses. Her hair also begins falling out when she is interacting with another Six member, Denise, at the hairdresser's.

== Reception ==
The Metro wrote that rather than being a queen bee, Suki is a "queen wasp". Almost a year into her EastEnders tenure, Inside Soap felt that she had reached "soap icon status in record time" due to her "wicked [and] villainous behaviour". Metro writer Maisie Spackman agreed and billed Suki an "icon". Sopal was shocked when she learned that people liked Suki at the beginning of her tenure and wondered how viewers could like somebody like her. Suki's relationship with Eve has been praised by the LGBTQ+ community and by Diva magazine, who praised the representation of late bloomer sapphics. At the 2023 Rainbow Honours, their storyline was awarded Media Moment of the Year.

Following the scenes of Suki's mental health struggle in the wake of Ranveer's attack, Rory Bennett from MyLondon billed Sopal as one of EastEnders's best-loved actresses. He noted how viewers had opined that Sopal deserved awards for her role in the storyline and had quickly become a fan favourite. At the 2020 Inside Soap Awards, Sopal was nominated for Best Villain. Also in 2020, she was nominated within two newcomer categories, at the I Talk Telly Awards and the Digital Spy Reader Awards. In 2021, she was nominated in the Serial Drama Performance category at the 26th National Television Awards. At the 2021 Inside Soap Awards, she was shortlisted for Best Actress and Best Villain. She also came third for Best Actor (Female) at the 2021 Digital Spy Reader Awards.

At the 2022 Asian Media Awards, she won the Best TV Character accolade. She also came in second place at the 2022 Digital Spy Reader Awards for Best Soap Couple, shared with Peace. 2023 saw another nomination at the National Television Awards, as well as being nominated for Best Soap Couple with Peace at the Inside Soap Awards.

== See also ==
- List of LGBT characters in soap operas
- List of soap opera villains
