= Habiba Ahmed =

- EastEnders character
- Portrayed by: Rukku Nahar
- Duration: 2019–20
- First appearance: Episode 5871; 19 February 2019
- Last appearance: Episode 6151; 22 October 2020
- Introduced by: John Yorke
In-universe information
- Occupation: Restaurateur; Waitress
- Sisters: Iqra Ahmed; Sakina Ahmed
- Sons: Tyrion Ahmed
- Grandfathers: Arshad Ahmed
- Grandmothers: Mariam Ahmed
- Other relatives: Masood Ahmed; Tamwar Masood

Habiba Ahmed is a fictional character from the BBC soap opera EastEnders, played by Rukku Nahar. The character and casting were announced in December 2018, along with that of Priya Davdra, who was cast as Habiba's older sister Iqra Ahmed. Nahar had grown up watching EastEnders and was excited to join the cast. The sisters were introduced as the granddaughters of established characters Arshad (Madhav Sharma) and Mariam Ahmed (Indira Joshi) and an extension of Masood Ahmed's (Nitin Ganatra) family. Habiba was characterised as attracting trouble despite her good intention, with Nahar calling her character mouthy, naïve and impulsive. The actress added that Habiba wants to take the stress off Iqra so she can enjoy herself. Habiba and Iqra's first appearance aired on 19 February 2019, and their initial storyline sees the sisters come to Walford to run Masood's restaurant, despite not having experience. The sisters are seen to be hiding a secret and it is revealed that Iqra ran away from an arranged marriage. Habiba initially clashes with several residents but it was teased that the sisters would also make good friends too.

Habiba later starts an affair with Adam Bateman (Stephen Rahman-Hughes), who is in a relationship with Honey Mitchell (Emma Barton). However, Habiba ends the affair when she realises that Adam will not leave Honey for her. Habiba then starts a secret relationship with Jags Panesar (Amar Adatia), the brother of Iqra's girlfriend Ash Panesar (Gurlaine Kaur Garcha). When the come become public, Jags and Ash's mother Suki Panesar (Balvinder Sopal) is furious and frames Jags for a crime he did not commit, leading to him being imprisoned for four years. A heartbroken Habiba unsuccessfully tries to get him released and is furious at the Panesars for their treatment of Jags. Nahar then left the role and her exit aired on 22 October 2020. In the storyline, Habiba makes Iqra choose between her and Ash and when Iqra refuses to do so, Habiba leaves Walford. Habiba continues to be mentioned as she gives birth to Jags' son Tyrion Ahmed the following year. Habiba received mostly positive reception from viewers and critics, although her exit was criticised. Critics noted how viewers were saddened and confused by her departure and wanted the character to return.

== Casting and characterisation ==
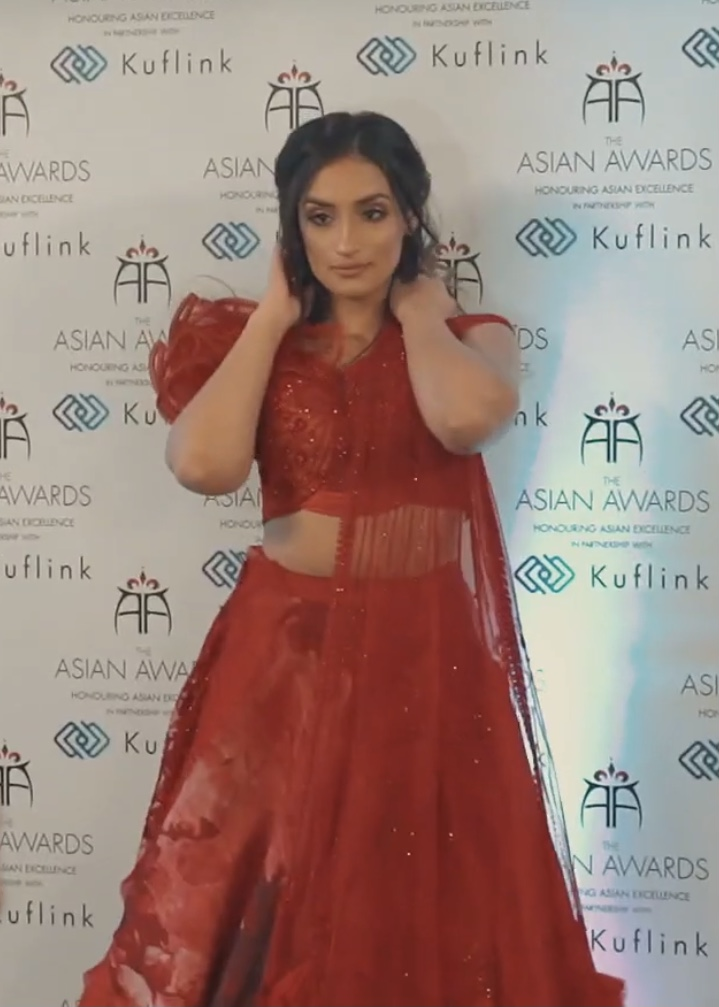
Rukku Nahar's casting as Habiba was announced in December 2018

On 20 December 2018, it was announced that Rukku Nahar had been cast as Habiba Ahmed on the BBC soap opera EastEnders along with Priya Davdra, who was cast as Habiba's sister Iqra Ahmed. Habiba and Iqra were both new regular characters. Nahar had previously portrayed Asha Kaur in Hollyoaks, another British soap opera. Nahar said of her EastEnders casting, "I'm so excited to have joined EastEnders, it's a show I've grown up watching and stepping onto Albert Square is just unreal. Habiba is great fun to play and I'm so happy to be working alongside Priya. Can't wait for you all to see what we get up to on the Square". Nahar explained that after she went back to the soap for another audition for the role, her agent called her to ask how she would feel about being on the soap and told her she had been successful in getting cast, which she was really excited about. She added, "I can't wait for to be on screen because it hasn't hit me yet, I still won't feel like I'm actually on the show until I've seen it." She did a joint birthday party and celebration of being cast on the soap due to her birthday being a week after the airing of her debut episode. She added that her favourite characters were Tracey (Jane Slaughter) and Mick Carter (Danny Dyer), the latter whom she quickly shared scenes with.

Habiba and Iqra were introduced as the granddaughters of established characters Arshad (Madhav Sharma) and Mariam Ahmed (Indira Joshi) and an extension of Masood Ahmed's (Nitin Ganatra) family. The sisters were reported as having been born and raised in the East End of London and characterised as being smart, confident, defiant and not stopping at anything to get what they want; Iqra was reported to be the younger sister of the pair and that she would consistently attract trouble despite having good intentions, and that Iqra is there to help her "clear up her mess". It was also reported that Iqra would find out that life in Walford, where EastEnders is set, is not easy especially when Habiba is involved. Senior executive producer of EastEnders Kate Oates teased of the new characters, "The sisters are certainly going to be a force to be reckoned with. Their arrival will throw number 41 into chaos as they become a nightmare for Mariam and Arshad. Residents of Walford beware, take on one of the sisters and you take on the pair." Davdra teased that the girls would make good friends in addition to enemies.

Nahar said of Iqra and Habiba, "They're really funny together – I feel like they'll bring a lot of excitement and fun. Also, I think even though they seem like they're enjoying themselves, there is a serious side to them and even more so with Iqra. I think that’s what can cause Habiba to not have so much of a serious head on when it comes to life. She wants to try and take the stress off her sister and enjoy herself." Nahar believed that Habiba was a very heightened version of herself, explaining, "She is me times ten! She is such a ball of energy, but can be naïve and also impulsive. Habiba is very mouthy too. I'd say she's a bit of a troublemaker but not intentionally. I feel like she causes trouble without knowing she's doing it..." Davdra added, "Expect full-on drama, trouble and a lot of fun. They are both very strong women and know how to get what they want - it's going to be an interesting journey!" In June 2019, Nahar and Davdra said that they were settling in despite still feeling new to the soap, and revealed that they sometimes got a bit lost on set. They also believed that they were showing a good rapport onscreen.

== Development ==
=== Introduction and family ===
Upon Habiba and Iqra's debut, it was reported that they would immediately make enemies of existing characters. It was also reported that they would be hiding a big secret. The sisters made their first appearance in the episode originally airing on 19 February 2019. Of filming her first scenes, Nahar explained that she had met Davdra a few days before she filmed her first scenes, which were also with Nahar; she added that filming together was fun as she felt that she had known Nahar for a long time, adding, "I feel like there is a lot of energy between us, we bounce off each other. I love the way we come in, it's full of energy and is a great introduction." In their opening scene, Iqra has to jump over the barrier at the tube station after Habiba accidentally throws her card under a newspaper stand. They then visit Masood's business, Walford East, before visiting any of their family members. The sisters arrive just as Masood is about to leave Walford and he is surprised to see them and suspicious that there is more to their unexpected visit. Habiba and Iqra tell Masood that they have been drafted in to look after the business by their family, although Masood does not believe this. Masood then catches the sisters firing the agency staff and vowing that they will run the restaurant instead, with Habiba being responsible for front of house and Iqra being the new chef. When Iqra objects, Habiba says that the other option is to return home and face the consequences. The sisters tell Masood that they want to be successful like him, but he does not believe them, but he decides to leave the sisters to it as he has already sold his part of the business and he leaves Walford. Masood briefly threatens to call the sisters' parents, which highly concerns them.

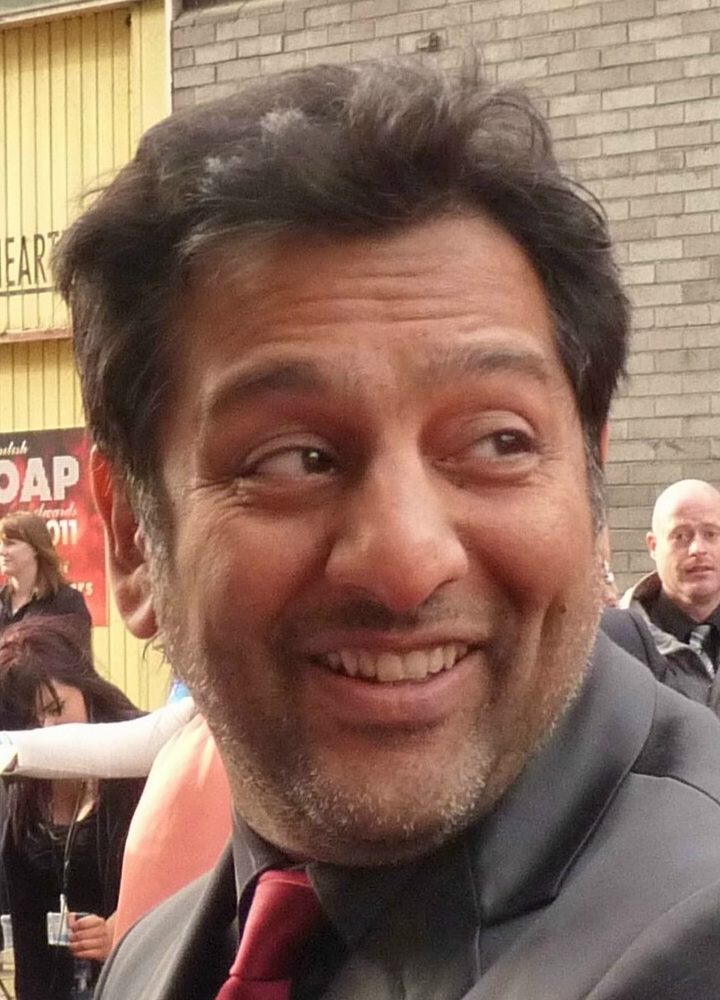
Nitin Ganatra (pictured) plays Habiba's relative, Masood.

Nahar explained that Habiba and Iqra get a warm welcome from some characters due to them being related to Masood, and hence there are "people they know and are able to turn to", but they also clash with others too. The sisters are firmly set on running the Walford East restaurant and try to rally business in the Queen Vic Pub; this leads to them quickly getting "on the wrong side" of the Slater family due to Habiba's clash with Kat Slater (Jessie Wallace), with Kat even calling Habiba "Haribo". Habiba and Iqra take a liking to the married Martin Fowler (James Bye) and they are warned off by flirting with him by Kat and others. Although Habiba is angered by her clash with Kat, she plans revenge on the pub's landlord Mick Carter (Danny Dyer) when she hears him tell Kat for not doing her cleaning job properly, so she spills a drink on him. Habiba's behaviour there confused Iqra. Habiba then sets the fire alarm off and steals Mick's waistcoat to give to Kat as revenge for him telling her off; this impresses Kat and she invites the sisters for a drink. Nahar explained that whilst the sisters do cause trouble, it is not their intention. She also explained that whilst the sisters bring "excitement and fun", they have a serious side too, and that Habiba is less serious in her attitude towards life than Iqra as she is trying to take the stress off her older sister and help Iqra enjoy herself. Of the sisters running the restaurant, Nahar revealed that other characters would soon notice that Iqra and Habiba do not have a lot of experience and are "winging it", and she believed that it would be humorous to watch them attempt to manage it. Davdra explained that the sisters want to run the restaurant well but have not worked in one before; she added that they came to Walford with a "clear goal in mind and will do anything to get what they want".

In the storyline, Habiba is seen to be "overly enthusiastic" about running the restaurant well, but she shuts Iqra down when she suggests that they should contact their parents to tell them how they are doing. Iqra is annoyed when Habiba hires Ruby Allen (Louisa Lytton) to support their promotional event as she is worried about how they will pay her, and Iqra is shocked when she learns what Habiba did to get money. It is later revealed that Iqra had run away from an arranged marriage and fears she will be unable to return the money spent on the ceremony, although Habiba tells her sister that she did the right thing as that marriage was about business and not love. Both girls also feel that their father will not forgive them for running away, but Habiba says that they should embrace their new life and not shut themselves away. A few weeks after starting their work in Walford East, Habiba and Iqra worry when Mel Owen (Tamzin Outhwaite) tries to get the girls fired in an attempt to raise money for the solicitor of her incarcerated son Hunter Owen (Charlie Winter).

=== Affair with Adam ===
Weeks after Habiba's debut, it was teased that there could be a romantic fling between Habiba and Arshad and Mariam's foster son Adam Bateman (Stephen Rahman-Hughes), who is in a relationship with Honey Mitchell (Emma Barton). Some viewers had already speculated that Adam was not right for Honey as problems started to show in their relationship, and when Habiba sees Adam at the Walford pancake race, it is revealed that he has a secret history with her and Iqra. In the characters' backstories, Habiba knew Adam from when he was fostered by her grandparents, though they have not seen each other in years. The pair begin subsequently begin flirting with each other. Habiba is besotted and tries to continuously pursue Adam even though she knows he is in a relationship; she invites him to lunch and flirts with him, and Honey tries to impress Habiba in front of Adam as she feels unsettled, though this backfires and Honey worries she has embarrassed herself. Iqra is angry at Habiba for what happened to Honey and rants to her, which is overheard by Honey's ex-husband, Billy Mitchell (Perry Fenwick), who puts Habiba "in her place". Habiba tries to make amends with Billy so that he does not tell Adam about her rude comments about Honey. Habiba is delighted when Adam helps her out at Walford East and gets in a playful flour fight with him, which angers Kathy Beale (Gillian Taylforth). Habiba then offers her services to Billy in order to spend more time with Adam, and they look after Billy and Honey's children when Billy leaves; later that night, Habiba kisses Adam when she believes they are alone. Billy sees Habiba trying to kiss Adam and is unsure whether he should tell Honey.

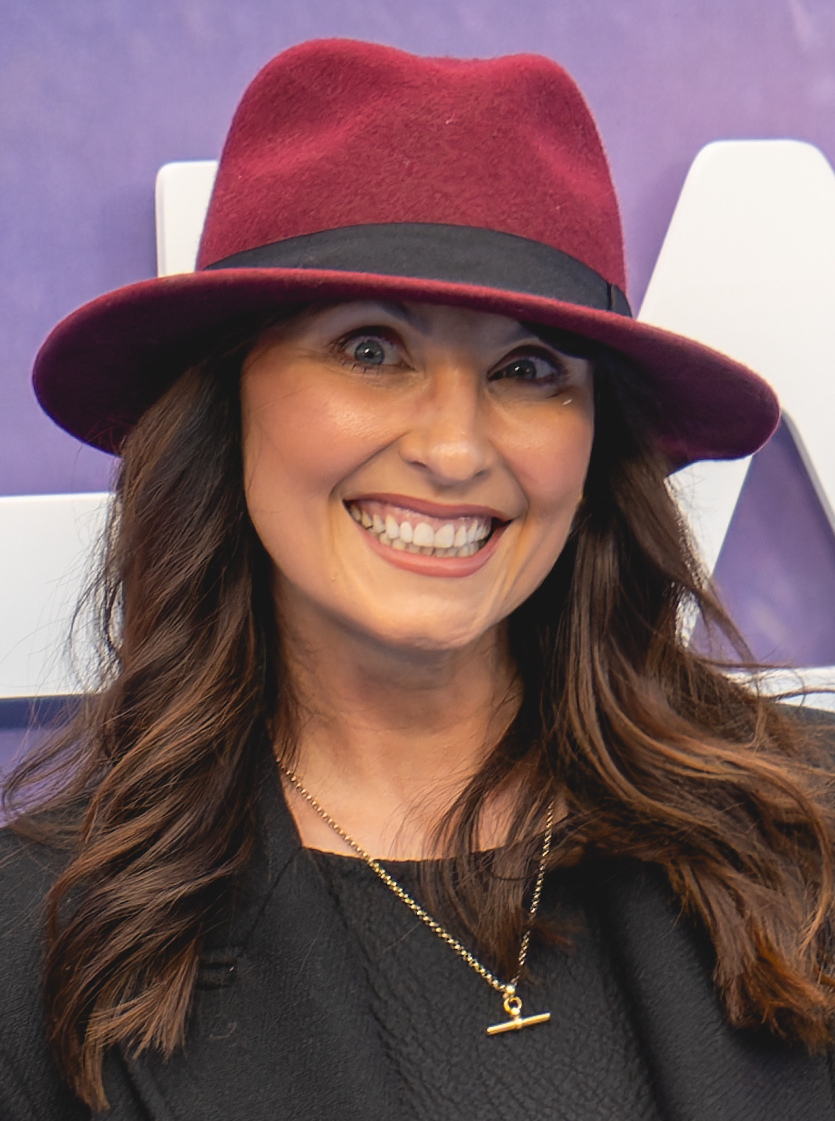
Emma Barton plays Honey, who is dating Adam whilst Habiba has an affair with him

Davdra and Nahar revealed to reporters at the 2019 British Soap Awards that Habiba and Iqra would have conflict each other in upcoming scenes, with Metro speculating that it was due to Habiba's fling with Adam, but the actress also said that the characters remained a "strong sister unit". Nahar also teased that upcoming scenes would reveal whether Habiba has more than a crush on Adam. In the storyline, the sisters panic when Mariam and Arshad return home unexpectedly and worry about how they will explain that they have been staying at their house for the past few and what the future for them in Walford will be. However, Adam ends up covering for them. When Billy finds Habiba and Adam kissing, his granddaughter Lola Pearce (Danielle Harold) – who wants Billy and Honey to reunite – pretends to be Habiba's friend in an attempt to get information out of her, which makes Iqra suspicious; Habiba does not end up confessing the affair to Lola and only confides in Iqra. Iqra becomes suspicious of Habiba and Adam getting close and during a showdown with her sister, Habiba reveals that she is having sex with Adams and plans to marry him. Habiba reveals that Adam is the first person she has had sex with and insists he wants to marry her even though she has not brought it up with her. Iqra is sceptical, but she starts to believe Adam has genuine feelings when he covers for the girls over why their grandparents' television is missing.

Whilst continuing their affair, Habiba pleads with Adam to end his relationship to Honey, who he plans to move in with; he refuses and says it is not the right time, and when Honey later sees Habiba upset, she confronts Adam about it. Adam manages to avoid the topic and later angrily breaks up with Habiba, leaving her in tears to be comforted by Iqra. Mariam and Arshad tell the sisters that they can stay longer in Walford but advise inviting Adam and Honey for a meal, but Iqra angrily warns Adam to stay away from Habiba. However, Adam later meets up with Iqra and they kiss and rekindle their secret relationship after Habiba tells him she is in love with him and will wait for him. They continue their affair, but Adam does not intend to leave Honey despite Habiba wanting a proper relationship with him. Iqra and Habiba clash over the situation, but Iqra comforts his sister after she is heartbroken when Adam reveals news about his future. Habiba faces further upset when she finds out that Adam has been helping Mariam find Habiba a suitable husband, which leaves Habiba "stung" and Iqra is surprised when Habiba agrees that it is time to find a partner. Honey plans to propose to Adam, but she is heartbroken when she catches Adam and Habiba having a "romantic moment" on her shop's CCTV. Rahman-Hughes said in an interview that Adam was playing a "dangerous game", whilst Barton speculated that Adam's childhood could have made him "a bit of a sad, troubled soul". Iqra later throws a curry at Adam for cheating on Honey with Habiba. She also comes out to Habiba as being in a relationship with a woman.

=== Relationship with Jags ===
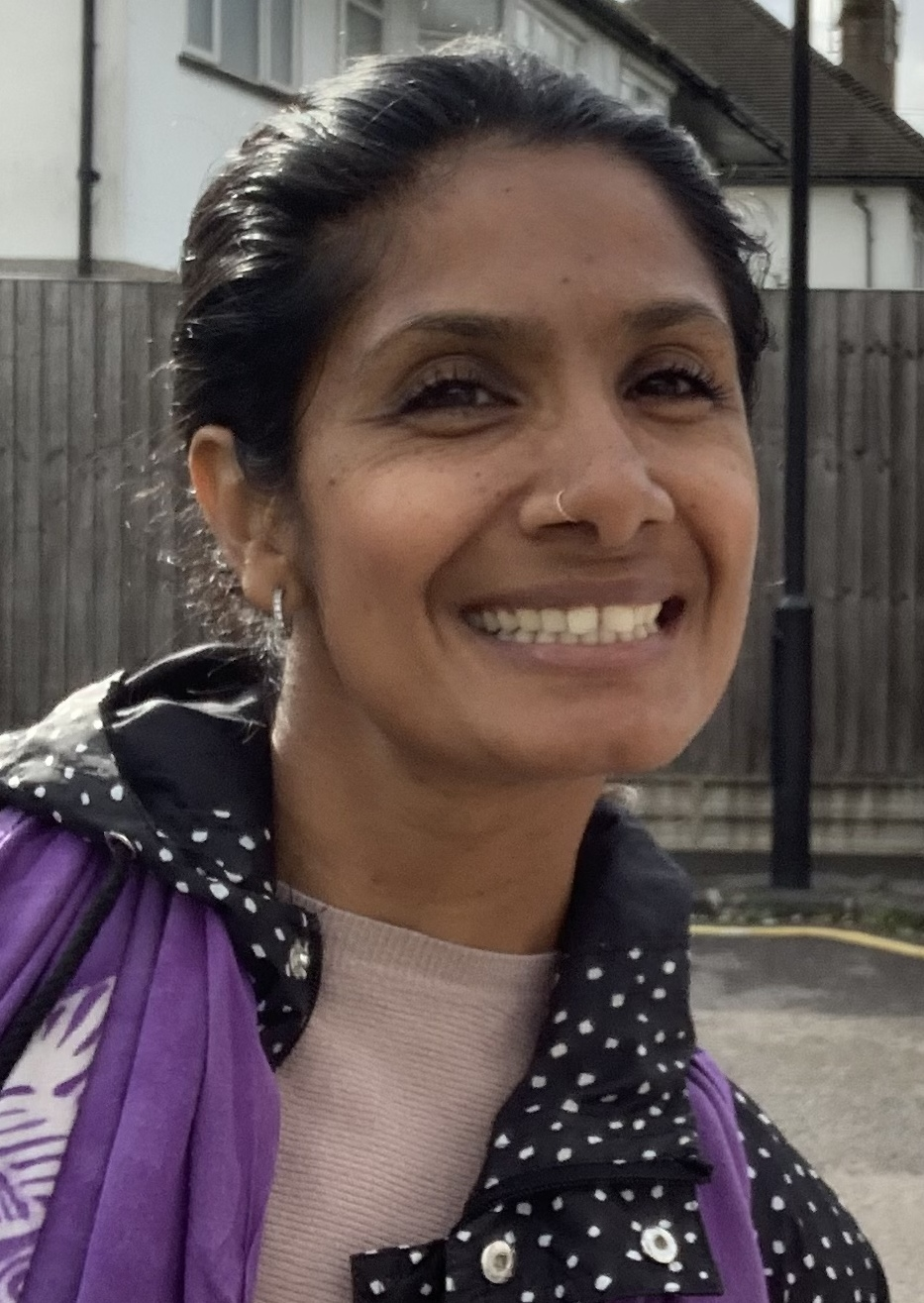
Balvinder Sopal plays Suki, who does not approve of Jags' relationship with Habiba

In 2020, Habiba develops a romance with Jags Panesar (Amar Adatia). Jags confides in Habiba about his mother Suki Panesar (Balvinder Sopal) lying about having cancer and the pair have a heart-to-heart, with Jags grateful of Habiba's support. Jags then opens up about another personal problem and a "touched" Habiba begins to see him in a new light as she believes that he is talking about his friend dying. They end up kissing and having sex, but they are awkward around each other the next day. EastEnders took a transmission break in 2020 due to the COVID-19 pandemic in the United Kingdom, and upon new episodes airing from September 2020, it is revealed that Habiba and Jag are dating in secret. Jags really wants to tell his mother that they are dating, but Habiba is not ready to be open about their relationship. When Iqra is seen to be coming, an embarrassed Habiba forces Jags to hide so that her family will not discover their relationship, which hurts him.

Adatia liked Jags having a partial enlightenment partially due to his relationship with Iqra, telling Digital Spy, "It's been nice! For him to have his own opinions on it – after being in the shadow of his mum and older brothers, for Jags it's a huge thing! The Panesars don't always do the right thing in the right way, so it's been refreshing for Jags to actually see the other side because of Habiba. She's the angel on one side and devil on the other is Suki, telling him what to do. In the end the devil wins!" The actor believed that Habiba had changed Jags for the better, explaining, "for Jags, it's having someone else giving him that positive influence, it opens his eyes and he starts realising that he could have a better life and that starts his rebellion towards his mum". Jags later reveals his relationship to the family, which Adatia believed was significant for the character. Suki is furious when the relationship is revealed. Jags is then arrested for Vinny's attack on Martin after being reported to the police by Suki, who thought he should do it for his family and as revenge for seeing Habiba before her back, which formed Adatia exit from EastEnders. Despite not knowing why Jags has taken the blame for something he did not do, Habiba believes that he is innocent and campaigns for his release. She becomes suspicious of Iqra's girlfriend and Jags' sister Ash Panesar (Gurlaine Kaur Garcha) when she tries to put her off this, so Habiba accuses Ash of knowing the truth and she vows to find out and expose the truth so Jags can be freed.

=== Departure and aftermath ===
Jags' imprisonment eventually leads to Habiba's own exit, which aired on 22 October 2020. In the storyline, Habiba's efforts to free Jags are unsuccessful and she is devastated when he is sentenced to four years in prison. Habiba is shocked by the Panesar's attitude towards Jags' arrest, especially when Ash does not attend Jags' sentencing hearing. Habiba subsequently tells Iqra that she wants Ash out of their house, angry that Ash did not support Jags when he needed her and not being able to live in the same house as her. When Habiba finds out that Iqra has not told Ash to move out, she tells her sister that she has to choose between her and Ash. Iqra refuses to choose between the pair and refuses to end her relationship with Ash and thus Habiba subsequently decides to leave Walford; Iqra tries to change her mind but Habiba insists she will stand by Jags. She also adds that she believes that Ash will hurt Iqra and that she cannot stand by to see that happen. Habiba then leaves Walford in a cab, devastating Iqra, in a scene that happens halfway through the episode. Following the airing of the episode, it was confirmed that Nahar had left EastEnders. Nahar also confirmed that she had left the soap on social media, thanking EastEnders for welcoming her "into one of the biggest soaps in the country!", adding, "I've learnt so much in the last two years and I'm grateful to have made friendships for life ❤️ End of a chapter, onto the next one." Several of Nahar's EastEnders colleagues commented on the post.

In January 2021, Iqra reveals to the Panesars that Habiba is pregnant with Jags' baby. Suki does not care about the pregnancy and Ash tells Iqra the truth about Jags being framed, with Garcha explaining that the pregnancy reveal has led to Ash revealing the truth as "It's not just about her siblings and mother – there's now an innocent child involved because of their lie. Ash is fiercely protective of her family, so as well as feeling protective, she also has the guilt – she's contributed towards this and she wants to put it right and maybe it's not too late". A disgusted Iqra ends their relationship over this. Later in 2021, the Panesars find out that Habiba has given birth to the baby and Suki also discovers that her son Kheerat (Jaz Deol) is paying Habiba's rent. In 2024, Habiba allows her son Tyrion Ahmed to stay with Suki and Nish Panesar (Navin Chowdhry); it is revealed that Habiba initially denied Vinny's request for Suki to spend time with Tyrion, but changed her mind when she finds out that Nish is dying and wants to see his grandson. Davdra later left EastEnders, with Iqra's departure airing in January 2022.

== Storylines ==
Habiba and her sister Iqra Ahmed (Priya Davdra) come to Albert Square with the intention of running the Walford East restaurant. Their relative Masood Ahmed (Nitin Ganatra) is suspicious of why the sisters have come here but allows them to run the restaurant. Habiba bumps into Adam Bateman (Stephen Rahman-Hughes), who was fostered by her grandparents Arshad Ahmed (Madhav Sharma) and Mariam Ahmed (Indira Joshi), and has an affair with him whilst he is in a relationship with Honey Mitchell (Emma Barton), which Iqra disapproves of. Adam constantly lets Habiba down, which upsets her, and she ends the affair when she realises that he will never leave Honey. Whilst celebrating Eid, Adam reveals that Iqra is in a secret relationship and she consequently comes out to Habiba as a lesbian. Habiba feels sympathy towards Honey and warns her about Adam, and later reveals her affair with him to make her see sense.

Months later, Jags Panesar (Amar Adatia) confides in Habiba about his mother's Suki Panesar's (Balvinder Sopal) bad behaviour and he also confides in Habiba about what she believes is his dying friend, although it is actually Jags' dead rat. Habiba and Iqra subsequently have sex and they then begin a relationship. Habiba initially wants to keep it a secret but they become public. Suki is furious about the relationship and makes Jags go to prison for an attack committed by his brother Vinny Panesar (Shiv Jalota). Habiba tries to prove Jags' innocence and proposes to him, and is devastated when he is sentenced to four years in prison. Angry at how Jags' family let him down, Habiba tells Iqra that her girlfriend and Jags' sister Ash Panesar (Gurlaine Kaur Garcha) cannot live with them anymore and tells her to choose between them. When Iqra refuses to choose, Habiba leaves Walford. She later gives birth to her and Jags' son Tyrion Ahmed on the same day that Jags is killed in prison.

== Reception ==
Reporting on the announcement of Habiba and Iqra's characters and casting, Claire Crick from What to Watch called Habiba a "major new role" and wrote, "it seems being in Hollyoaks has given the actress [Nahar] a taste of what's to come on EastEnders..." Sophie Dainty called Habiba and Iqra "mischievous" and noted that they instantly made enemies with Kat and Mick, noting that they were "far from impressed" with the sisters. She also questioned whether Habiba made a big mistake by potentially gaining Mick as an enemy. Katie Baillie from Metro wrote that the sisters came "bounding into Albert Square" and that they "hit Walford like a whirlwind". She also thought it was unlikely that the sisters were being truthful when they told Masood that they had been drafted in to look after the business by their family and noted how Masood did not believe them but decided he did not care. She later wrote that Habiba and Iqra's debut had raised a lot of questions and had been "shrouded in mystery", and believed that their behaviour of hiring the agency staff and deciding to run the restaurant themselves despite their lack of experience was strange; she also noted that Habiba did some "some weird hijinx" in the pub with Kat. Baillie's colleague, Duncan Lindsay, called Habiba and Iqra "fun loving and mischievous" with a "burst of energy" and noted that whilst they would cause chaos, they would also make some surprising friends due to their "humour and warmth"; he also believed that Masood was right to be suspicious of their arrival. Lindsay later commented on how the sisters were really evasive when asked why they had come to Walford; he also questioned whether they would be successfully in running the restaurant and keep their "contagious mischief and lust for life". He later noted that they debuted "as a strong and supportive unit to one another" and believed that their bond could be broken due to Habiba's fling with Adam, which Lindsay called a "horrible truth". Johnathon Hughes from Radio Times dubbed the sisters as being lively and feisty and noted that they made "quite an impression during their first week in the Square - good and bad!"

Following their debut, Sarah Ellis from Inside Soap speculated that the two characters were hiding a "dark secret". Two days after their first appearance, Angie Quinn noted how viewers were "completely divided" over the sisters, writing, "The newest residents of Walford have only been in the square for a few days and are already causing a stir." Quinn called the sisters "feisty" and found their antics in their first episodes amusing, adding that she sensed "trouble ahead" due to Habiba winding Mick up. She also noted how some viewers expressed on social media that they liked Habiba and Iqra whilst others bemoaned the sisters and asked for them to leave the soap quickly. Quinn also pined Habiba as "cunning" and added, "I'm sure the pair's intentions will soon be exposed, we are excited to find out how everything unfolds." Stephanie Chase from Digital Spy noted how Habiba and Iqra broke the law in their first scene on the soap and "wasted no time getting into mischief as soon as they arrived"; she also believed that Habiba appeared to be the "more rebellious one" and thought it was obvious the sisters were hiding something. Chase also noted how viewers drew comparison between Habiba and Iqra and former EastEnders sisters Ronnie (Samantha Womack) and Roxy Mitchell (Rita Simons) on social media, writing, "with an arrival like that, it wasn't long before viewers drew a lot of comparisons between Iqra and Habiba and Ronnie and Roxy Mitchell, who also arrived on the Square unannounced and quickly made an impression back in 2007".

Sophie Dainty from Digital Spy called the relationship between Adam and Habiba a "shock" and "forbidden fling", believing that it would cause heartbreak for Honey. Dainty noted how Habiba was besotted and wondered if she had "made a new enemy" in Billy due to her behaviour towards Honey; she also questioned whether Habiba would be able to successfully "woo Adam". Dainty later noted how Habiba suffered a "big setback" when she found out Adam was helping Mariam find a husband for her and believed that Habiba was defiant when she agreed that was time to find a partner. She later commented that Habiba made a "beeline" for Adam and later gave "into temptation" when she kissed him. Dainty also believed Habiba's comments towards Honey were cruel. Dainty also called Habiba's attempt to kiss of Adam an "incriminating moment" and believed that there had been signs that Adam would have his "head turned" by her. Chris Edwards from the same website noted that Habiba's situation with Adam got more complicated after her grandparents advised her to meet up with him and Honey for a meal. He also believed that their affair took a "dramatic twist" and noted how Habiba was heartbroken when he briefly ended things with her. Edwards' colleague, Justin Harp, called Habiba and Iqra a "new double act" and believed that Habiba "got stuck straight into the drama shortly after arriving" when she began her affair with Adam. Harp also noted how Habiba was not deterred in her relationship with Adam after her showdown with Iqra and believed that their affair had "spiralled totally out of control".

In November 2019, Rebecca Koncienzcy from Liverpool Echo wrote how viewers went "wild for Habiba" on social media after she wore a latex catsuit to work; she noted that viewers were "blown away" by her outfit and added that several viewers liked Habiba's "running commentary" of the fight between Keegan Baker (Zack Morris) and Ian Beale (Adam Woodyatt), with Koncienzcy finding Habiba's narration of the fight "hilarious". In February 2020, Stephen Patterson from Metro noted that viewers were "disgusted and traumatised" after Habiba, Iqra and Bobby Beale (Clay Milner Russell) were verbally and physically abused in an Islamophobic attack, with Patterson noting that viewers were "Aching for Bobby, Iqra and Habiba" and had expressed their "horror" on Twitter.

Johnathon Hughes from Radio Times believed that Adam had "toyed" with "smitten" Habiba's emotions. His colleague, David Brown, called Habiba's fling with Adam a "shock affair" and hoped that Honey would find out about the affair so she would get back together with Billy. Brown later wrote that Adam was having "illicit trysts" with Habiba whilst "playing happy families with Honey". Angie Quinn from MyLondon noted how several viewers were unimpressed and embarrassed by Habiba and Adam's "steamy bedroom scene", with several viewers expressed their disgust with this scene on Twitter and one saying it made them feel sick; Quinn noted that fans "got more than they bargained for" when they saw this scene.

After Habiba has sex with Jags, Dainty from Digital Spy wondered whether the two characters would become a new couple. Stephen Patterson from Metro also asked the same thing, believing that their fling could be the latest "shock and passionate" romance in EastEnders. Patterson's colleague, Calli Kitson, opined that Habiba was being cruel by hiding her relationship with Jags, believing that it broke his heart. Patterson questioned whether their relationship would survive due to Habiba wanting to keep their relationship a secret. Patterson later speculated that Suki could kill Habiba after she threatened to expose the truth to liberate Jags, with Patterson opining that Habiba was "playing with fire" due to Suki being dangerous and that Habiba had "crossed the line in Suki's eyes". Kilkelly from Digital Spy opined that Jags had a "bit of an enlightenment" partially due to his secret relationship with Habiba.

Following Habiba's exit, Dainty noted that the character had a "heartbreaking few weeks" and opined that her biggest stories were her affair with Adam and her relationship with Jags. Patterson found Habiba's departure "shocking" and called her "broken", also noting that there was "animosity aplenty" between Habiba and her sister in her final episode. Patterson later wrote that Habiba "made her mark on Walford" and noted that the character felt "compelled" to depart the Square as she believed that Jags' family had let him down. Patterson's colleague, Calli Kitson, noted how Habiba left as she refused to put up with "evil" Suki's meddling, and questioned how Suki would react to Habiba's pregnancy. Kitson later opined that Habiba left "after realising no-one was prepared to save Jags from prison" and wondered whether the character could return so that the Panesars could meet the baby.

Speaking about Habiba's "very quick exit", a writer from Heart noted how several viewers expressed confusion on social media about Habiba's surprise departure. The writer also noted that Habiba had had a difficult few weeks and that the character had some "big" storylines, such as her affair with Adam. Verity Sulway from the Daily Mirror reported how viewers were angry, surprised and "devastated" by Habiba's quiet and "underwhelming" departure which lacked a storyline, with several viewers displaying this dissatisfaction on social media. In 2021, Laura-Jayne Tyler from Inside Soap opined that Habiba had more of a storyline after her exit, and noted that it was a "current trend" in EastEnders due to it also happening with Jags and Max Branning (Jake Wood). The following year, Ayaan Ali from MyLondon reported how viewers on a Digital Spy wanted Habiba and Iqra to return to EastEnders, with Ali noting how viewers were unhappy with their "abrupt exits" and that Habiba could return to make the lives of the Panesars difficult. Ali also called the sisters "bubbly" and their storylines "unfinished", and also believed that Habiba's most memorable storyline was when she started a relationship with Jags.
