= Kheerat Panesar =

Fictional character from EastEnders

- EastEnders character
- Portrayed by: Jaz Deol
- Duration: 2019–2022
- First appearance: Episode 6001; 4 October 2019
- Last appearance: Episode 6589; 10 November 2022
- Introduced by: Jon Sen
- Spin-off appearances: The Queen Vic Quiz Night (2020)
In-universe information
- Other names: Kheerat Singh Panesar
- Occupation: Businessman
- Family: Panesar
- Father: Nish Panesar
- Mother: Suki Panesar
- Stepmother: Eve Unwin
- Brothers: Jags Panesar; Vinny Panesar
- Sisters: Ash Panesar
- Half-brothers: Ravi Gulati
- Nephews: Davinder "Nugget" Gulati; Tyrion Ahmed
- Nieces: Avani Nandra-Hart

Kheerat Panesar is a fictional character from the BBC soap opera EastEnders, played by Jaz Deol. Kheerat was introduced alongside brothers Jags (Amar Adatia), and Vinny Panesar (Shiv Jalota) in episode 6001, broadcast on 4 October 2019, with the trio becoming the soap's first Punjabi Sikh family. Kheerat's arrival was announced on 21 August 2019, billed as the dominant and successful leader of his brothers. Deol accepted the role after being impressed by what was pitched to him by the producers, and being excited to be a part of the show's first Punjabi Sikh family.

Kheerat's storylines in the serial have included the expansion of his family, helping to bring justice to Gray Atkins (Toby-Alexander Smith) with help from Whitney Dean (Shona McGarty), his friendship with Ben Mitchell (Max Bowden), his romances and flings with several female characters including Chantelle Atkins (Jessica Plummer), Sharon Watts (Letitia Dean), and Stacey Slater (Lacey Turner), and falsely confessing to the murder of Ranveer Gulati (Anil Goutam) to save his mother, Suki Panesar (Balvinder Sopal), from arrest. In November 2022, Deol departed from the show as he wanted to pursue other projects. Deol received various awards and nominations for his portrayal, despite the character's departure being poorly received by audiences.

== Development ==
=== Casting and introduction ===
Actor Jaz Deol was cast as Kheerat. On 21 August 2019, it was announced that three new characters would be introduced to the soap in the near future: Kheerat, and his brothers Jags (Amar Adatia) and Vinny Panesar (Shiv Jalota), dubbed "the Panesar brothers". The trio, who were the show's first ever Punjabi Sikh family, were billed by show bosses as being "charming by nature but still a force to be reckoned with" and would bring "their own unique blend of charm and chaos" to Walford. Executive producer Jon Sen expressed enthusiasm to introduce the brothers and explore their upcoming storylines. Deol was enticed to accept the role after being impressed by what producers pitched to him, and being excited to be a part of the show's first Punjabi Sikh family, describing his role as "revolutionary". He was pleased to gain the part: "I'm very proud and excited to be joining such an iconic show and bringing to life a character that is a reflection of the cultural background that I and many others come from in today's modern Britain. I can't wait to get started and for viewers to meet the Panesars". The actor was interested to wear a turban for the role, as he doesn't wear one himself, seeing it as an opportunity for representation. The brothers were set to make their debut later in 2019.

Later details surrounding their arrival were teased by Sen, who revealed that the brothers would "turn up" on an unknown "mission". He added that there would be a feud with another family "pretty much as soon as they arrive". The feud was later revealed to be with Ben Mitchell (Max Bowden), who Kheerat and Jags would arrive and threaten for stealing Kheerat's car. Ahead of the arrival, Sen further explained that EastEnders "is a show that prides itself on diversity" and "representing modern London and modern Britain", so the team were interested in "finding a way of telling stories from the Sikh community". He added: "They arrive with a little bit of a bang" and were teased to have "quite the impact". Deol teased that Kheerat would be "coming to mean business". Kheerat and Jags made their first appearance in episode 6001, broadcast 4 October 2019.

The brothers were announced to return later in October, with reasons why being hidden, but it was teased that Kheerat would feud with Iqra Ahmed (Priya Davdra) and Ash Kaur (Gurlaine Kaur Garcha). In a twist, it was revealed that the brothers had returned to find Ash, who was also their estranged sister.

=== Characterisation ===
Upon their introduction, it is established that Kheerat, who is age 31, is the oldest of his siblings and a "flashy" and "successful businessman", which creates envy from his brother Jags. He often has to "keep his little brothers out of trouble", but can "charm his way into anything". It was suggested that the trio were "led" by Kheerat. They were teased to have a "strong dynamic with each other", with their relationships being hinged on "a lot of mischief and just a hint of jealousy". Sen billed them as "loveable rogues" and "wheeler dealers" over being hardened criminals, and teased the brothers bringing "a completely different tone and flavour" to the serial and being prone to "ruffle feathers". Kheerat has been described as "controlling", "alpha male", "logical", and "opportunistic". Deol noted that despite Kheerat being a reasonable person, he faces inner demons. When Kheerat's personality began to undergo changes, Deol praised the decision as it allowed for Kheerat's "complicated and conflicted nature" to be shown. He added that Kheerat is "a man with a huge capacity to love his family and significant other but also a well of darkness that he can reveal at a drop of a hat" and that since his father was imprisones, Kheerat has been "someone who searches for the opportunity in everything".

=== Notable relationships ===
==== Suki Panesar ====
In December 2019, it was announced that Kheerat's mother Suki Panesar (Balvinder Sopal) would be introduced in early 2020. Executive producer Jon Sen commented that Kheerat and his siblings had "lived under the shadow of an overbearing matriarch" and teased that while the brothers "arrived as men", Suki's introduction would show that they were "little boys who need their mum". Sopal described her character's relationship to her sons as being "very good", wanting to keep her children "close". Stephen Patterson of the Metro noted parallels in Kheerat and Suki's behaviour, wondering if Kheerat had inherited his mother's "controlling nature". After Suki began doing business with Stan "Stas" Saunders (Adam Young), despite previously endangering Kheerat's life, Deol explained that Kheerat would put on a "deep and cold rage" to mask his "hurt" from the betrayal. He described it as "definitely a turning point in their relationship", and teased that Suki would not approve of upcoming Kheerat's relationship with Sharon Watts (Letitia Dean).

==== Chantelle and Gray Atkins ====
In September 2020, it had been announced that Chantelle Atkins (Jessica Plummer) would try to escape her abusive marriage to Gray Atkins (Toby-Alexander Smith), turning to Kheerat for help. When asked about how Chantelle felt for Kheerat, Plummer explained that her character "sees him as somebody she trusts more than a lot of people" and "feels safe with him", noting that Chantelle had begun developing an attraction to Kheerat. Deol disclosed the hopes that Kheerat had for him and Chantelle, detailing that Kheerat was "ready to leave and start a new life with her and [her] kids". After Chantelle was eventually killed by Gray, Deol teased that Kheerat would play a part in Gray's downfall. Deol described her death as "the end of a dream" for Kheerat, due to their hopes of starting anew together, as "words can't describe" Kheerat's emotions in the moment.

Deol explained that Kheerat had a "gut instinct" that "something wasn't right" and that Chantelle's death was not accidental, explaining: "In his mind, he cannot dispute that feeling and it haunts him to this day. Maybe even the rest of his life". He added that Kheerat knew Gray was behind the murder and was frustrated as he "doesn't have the evidence to prove it" and "can't act on his anger" as he was a well-respected solicitor with an in-depth knowledge of how to exploit the law. The actor considered Gray to be Professor Moriarty to Kheerat's Sherlock Holmes.

==== Mitch Baker ====
Following Chantelle's death, Kheerat was set to share his suspicions about Gray to her father, Mitch Baker (Roger Griffiths). As Kheerat and Mitch had no prior relationship, Griffiths revealed that Mitch would initially be hesitant to believe Kheerat's claims of Chantelle's infidelity and Gray being behind her death. As "Mitch doesn't like Gray" and the two have a history, Griffiths added that Mitch would have to be "careful and manage his emotions" upon the news. Deol noted that due to Gray's status around Walford, allying with Mitch was the best move for Kheerat, as he was aware of Mitch and Gray's complicated dynamic. He explained: "Knowing Mitch's history with Gray, Kheerat is playing on the heartstrings of a man that wasn't able to protect his baby girl because he couldn't protect Chantelle either. It's something that they can both connect with. That feeling of helplessness".

==== Stacey Slater ====
A year after Kheerat had a one-night stand with Stacey Slater (Lacey Turner), Turner teased a romance between the pair, commenting: "You'd never put them as a match but they had a one-night stand a long time ago and there are some feelings still lingering". She continued that a romance between them would be "interesting" and "complicated" as there had been "a bit of a war between the Slaters and the Panesars". Turner opined that there was "something sizzling between them" and Stacey would enjoy how a relationship with Kheerat would annoy his mother, Suki, as "they really do hate each other". The actress concluded: "They definitely have a hold over each other so we will see how it plays out". After Stacey faced a stint in prison, their romance was revisited.

==== Ben Mitchell ====
Ben had stolen Kheerat's expensive car, and the siblings wanted to show him who was boss leading to a dramatic feud. In 2021, it was teased that Kheerat would team up with "an unexpected family". After Ben called off Jags' protection in prison, resulting in Jags death, he kept the betrayal a secret. Teasing potential fallout with Ben should the truth be revealed, Deol said: "As far he's concerned, Ben did everything he could to protect his brother. So yes I think he does trust him. Whether that extends to the other members of Mitchell tribe is another question!" Ben's guilt lead him to try distancing himself from Kheerat by admitting he doesn't want his business partnering involved in the Arches anymore. Deol commented that "Kheerat knows the value of having a business stake in The Arches" and can "always make an offer that no one can refuse", despite admitting that his friendship with ben worked on a "personal and business level".

==== Sharon Watts ====
After signs of attraction between Kheerat and Sharon aired, Deol noted that it was "obvious" to viewers that a relationship with Sharon would "cause more problems with the Mitchells", due to Sharon's on-off relationship with Phil Mitchell (Steve McFadden). Their passion was later explored in May 2021 as they kicked off a romance. Deol admitted that he was initially unsure about how the romance would work, but grew an understanding after filming the scenes began. He noted that deep down his character still grieved for Chantelle, and was drawn to Sharon as the two women shared several traits which got him to "take his armour down". As their relationship would have caused drama in both character's respective families, Kheerat decided to quickly end it.

=== Departure ===
After Suki was arrested for murdering Ranveer Gulati (Anil Goutam) after he tried to rape her, unaware she was actually innocent, Kheerat planned to confess to the murder to save her from arrest. After Kheerat's arrest was aired in November 2022, it was confirmed that Deol had left the role, with a spokesperson for the show wishing him the best for his future work. In July 2024, Deol opined that he missed playing Kheerat, who he deemed a "fantastic character", but had to leave the show to pursue other projects.

== Storylines ==
Kheerat and his brother Jags (Amar Adatia) first arrive in Walford to confront Ben Mitchell (Max Bowden) after he steals Kheerat's car. They threaten retaliation unless the car is returned and when Ben fails to deliver, Jags kidnaps Lola Pearce (Danielle Harold), but Kheerat berates him for this and later agrees to let her go after Ben promises to repay them. Kheerat threatens Ben and Lola's daughter Lexi Pearce (Isabella Brown) as they are leaving.

A few weeks later, the brothers, joined by their other brother Vinny (Shiv Jalota), return in search of their estranged sister Ash Kaur (Gurlaine Kaur Garcha). Kheerat reveals that Ash had an abortion years ago, disapproving of this. The brothers move into Walford and Kheerat apologises to Ash for his opinions on abortion, but upon discovering Ash's girlfriend, Iqra Ahmed (Priya Davdra), is a Muslim, he expresses further disapproval with Ash. He falls in love with old acquaintance Chantelle Atkins (Jessica Plummer) after employing her at the Panesar call centre, unaware she is trapped in an abusive marriage to Gray Atkins (Toby-Alexander Smith). They plan to run away together but Kheerat is devastated to learn that she has died in a tragic accident, aware that Gray was behind the death to some extent and being accusatory towards him.

He later has a one-night stand with Stacey Slater (Lacey Turner) after they spend a night drinking and confiding in each other about their relationship woes. After Vinny attacks Martin Fowler (James Bye) and it is revealed that Jags is in a secret relationship with Habiba Ahmed (Rukku Nahar) and no longer wants to be involved in the family business, Kheerat is dismayed to learn that his mother Suki Panesar (Balvinder Sopal) has arranged for Jags to be arrested for Vinny's crime. Habiba leaves Walford and when Kheerat discovers she is pregnant he decides to pay for her flat and out of guilt for what his mother has done. At the same time, Kheerat enters a relationship with Sharon Watts (Letitia Dean). They decide to keep their romance a secret, but when Sharon's former stepson Ben catches them together he decides to call off Jags' protection and Kheerat is later devastated to learn that Jags has been killed in a prison fight.

Kheerat begins a secret relationship with Stacey after teaming up with Whitney Dean (Shona McGarty) to take down Gray after she figures out Gray killed Chantelle. To spook Gray, he posts printed screenshots of Chantelle's forum posts detailing her abuse to Gray, but it backfires as Gray finds out and they violently fight, forcing Kheerat to go on the run. Gray is later arrested after his second wife Chelsea Fox (Zaraah Abrahams) records him confessing to the murder. Afterwards, he and Stacey go public as a couple. After Ben is raped by Lewis Butler (Aidan O'Callaghan), contracting chlamydia and seeing a mental health decline, Kheerat helps Ben calm down and then takes him to the hospital to check for AIDS, which Ben is relieved to find he doesn't have. Ben is grateful towards Kheerat, but begins feeling guilty for causing Jags's death. He confesses to it, resulting in Kheerat attacking Ben.

When Ranveer Gulati (Anil Goutam) tries to rape Suki, she knocks him out with a clock, under the impression that she killed him. When his son Ravi (Aaron Thiara) walks in, he helps her hide the body and, when she leaves, Ranveer wakes up and Ravi murders him. Kheerat's father Nish Panesar (Navin Chowdhry) is later released from prison, and is unable to bond with Kheerat. Hoping to sow distrust, Nish asks Ravi to flirt with Stacey, and when Stacey reports this to Kheerat, he is furious and fights with Ravi. When Ranveer's body is uncovered, Suki is arrested for his murder, Kheerat tells her girlfriend Eve Unwin (Heather Peace) that he is planning to confess to the murder to save his mother from prison, and despite both Stacey and Suki pleading him not to, he remains adamant and is later arrested, to the dismay of his loved ones. Kheerat is later sentenced to life imprisonment.

== Reception ==
For his portrayal of Kheerat, Deol was nominated for the Best Soap Performance at the 2020 I Talk Telly Awards and was shortlisted for the Best Newcomer at the 2020 Inside Soap Awards. Throughout 2021, Deol was awarded nominations for Serial Drama Performance at the 26th National Television Awards and the Best Actor at the Inside Soap Awards. He won the award for the Best TV Character at the 2021 Asian Media Awards. At the 2022 Inside Soap Awards, Deol was nominated for the Best Actor and shortlisted for the Best Romance, shared with Turner. He placed second for the Best Male Soap Actor for the 2022 Digital Spy Reader Awards.

Prior to their fling, it was speculated that Kheerat and Chantelle would begin an affair. After the ship received "overwhelming fan support", Deol expressed joy to Digital Spy about how a "you have British turban wearing Sikh man in love with a mixed race woman and that's completely okay", adding that he was "moved" by people who were encouraging a relationship between the characters and hoped it would help pave the way for more representation on television. Verity Sulway of Daily Mirror reported viewers predicting Kheerat would save Chantelle from Gray. After Chantelle's death, Calli Kitson of the Metro commented that Kheerat had been a notably present character in comparison to his brothers, and praised how Chantelle's demise had offered "a more truthful side" of Kheerat to viewers, opining that it offered more room for audience sympathy towards him. Following the episode that aired on 15 February 2021, where it is revealed that Kheerat had been spooking Gray, Grace Morris of What's On TV reported viewers being "ecstatic" by the revenge. She continued by highlighting positive Twitter reactions of users "applauding" Kheerat, to which she agreed.

After Kheerat's departure aired, Stephen Patterson of the Metro commented that Kheerat had become a "beloved" character across his stint and found his departure to be emotional. Laura Denby of Radio Times called the unannounced departure a "shock", and hoped that the character wasn't gone from the soap for good as he had become "a popular mainstay" and his exit had been deemed a "huge injustice". Matt Spivey of MyLondon called Kheerat a "firm fan favourite", despite acknowledging the character's various "rough patches". His colleague, Amber-Louise Large, noted that viewers were unhappy with Kheerat's ending, with many calling his exit storyline "far fetched" and "terrible". Joe Crutchley of the Daily Mirror reported high demand for Kheerat to return, even after being absent for over a year. Looking back at his time on the soap, Deol noted Kheerat "meant so much" to both the fans and Punjabi Sikh people. He disclosed that people still approached him to express how they missed the character.
