= Jags Panesar =

Fictional character from EastEnders

- EastEnders character
- Portrayed by: Amar Adatia
- Duration: 2019–2020
- First appearance: Episode 6001; 4 October 2019
- Last appearance: Episode 6144; 9 October 2020
- Introduced by: Jon Sen
In-universe information
- Other names: Jagvir Panesar
- Family: Panesar
- Father: Nish Panesar
- Mother: Suki Panesar
- Stepmother: Eve Unwin
- Brothers: Kheerat Panesar; Vinny Panesar
- Sisters: Ash Panesar
- Half-brothers: Ravi Gulati
- Sons: Tyrion Ahmed
- Nephews: Davinder "Nugget" Gulati
- Nieces: Avani Nandra-Hart

Jags Panesar is a fictional character from the BBC soap opera EastEnders, played by Amar Adatia. Jags was introduced alongside brothers Kheerat (Jaz Deol), and Vinny Panesar (Shiv Jalota) in episode 6001, broadcast on 4 October 2019. Billed by executive producer Jon Sen to bring "charm and chaos", the trio of brothers were also marked as soap's first Punjabi Sikh family in its history. Sen was also vocal about his eagerness to introduce stories from different cultures through the brothers. Adatia expressed excitement to join the soap as he never expected to be cast on it. Jags's storylines included abducting Lola Pearce (Danielle Harold), his prior connection to Chantelle Atkins (Jessica Plummer), his romance with Habiba Ahmed (Rukku Nahar), and being framed by his mother Suki Panesar (Balvinder Sopal), resulting in his imprisonment.

After Jags tells his family about his relationship with Habiba, which Adatia considered a landmark moment for his character, Suki's fury leads her to frame Jags for attacking Martin Fowler (James Bye), despite knowing Jags's brother Vinny was responsible. Despite Adatia having prior commitments to other projects, and knowing from his casting that his time on the soap was limited, the impact of the COVID-19 pandemic on television meant the actor could stay on the show for longer to finish filming his character's storylines. Jags was arrested in October 2020, making his final on-screen appearance in episode 6144, broadcast on 9 October 2020. Eight months later, it was revealed that Jags had been murdered off-screen in a prison attack. Jags's exit story and eventual death were met with a mixed critical response.

== Development ==
=== Casting and introduction ===
On 21 August 2019, it was announced that the Panesar brothers, consisting of Jags (Amar Adatia), Kheerat (Jaz Deol), and Vinny (Shiv Jalota), would join the soap in the upcoming Autumn. The brothers were teased to arrive with "score to settle" with another family and were billed by show bosses as "charming by nature but still a force to be reckoned with". Jags, along with Kheerat and Vinny, were the first Sikh characters to appear on the soap. Executive producer Jon Sen teased that the brothers would "bring their own unique blend of charm and chaos onto the Square". He continued by promising they would arrive to "settle the score" with another family, but "fate quickly takes a hand" and results in the brothers settling in Walford. Speaking on the news of his casting, Adatia was excited to join: "My younger self would never have believed I'd be on EastEnders. It's pretty amazing to be part of one of the most iconic television shows alongside some of the best actors in the business. I really am so grateful". The brothers were created to be new regular characters for the soap.

Upon his introduction, Jags is 27 years old and the middle child of the three brothers. Jags was said to be envious of Kheerat's lifestyle as Kheerat was a successful businessman, having "always" had difficulty to step out of his shadow. Despite this, it was said that Jags "idolised" his older brother. He was billed as being "no-nonsense", a "try-hard", and often leaving his brothers and the rest of his family "unimpressed" as none of his plans would ever come to fruition, "despite his best intentions". The brothers would have a "strong dynamic", including "a lot of mischief" and "just a hint of jealousy". Ahead of their arrival, Sen disclosed that the brothers would "turn up" in Walford "with a mission that will become apparent". Sen enthused about being "thrilled" to introduce the "vibrant" siblings, especially excited to explore their storylines. He was also keen to introduce the show's first Sikh characters, explaining: "EastEnders is a show that prides itself on diversity, representing modern London and modern Britain. We were really keen at finding a way of telling stories from the Sikh community". Jags and Kheerat were set appear first and be followed by Vinny. Spoilers and teasers leading up to their arrival showcased that the brothers would be "gunning for" Ben Mitchell (Max Bowden), Jags and Kheerat arriving to threaten him for stealing Kheerat's car. The dispute would result in Jags abducting Lola Pearce (Danielle Harold) as revenge on Ben for crossing his brother. Jags and Kheerat made their first appearance in episode 6001, broadcast on 4 October 2019.

=== Relationship with Habiba ===
In March 2020, after a heartfelt conversation with Habiba Ahmed (Rukku Nahar), the characters shared an unexpected kiss and slept together. It was announced that the show would explore a romance between the pair as Habiba would "begin to see Jags in a new light" after he confides in her about his relationship with his cold mother Suki (Balvinder Sopal) and about an old friend of his being at death's door. Following the inaugural night, Jags and Habiba began to date in secret. Adatia explained that the relationship enlightened Jags to his mother's ruthlessness, describing Habiba and Suki as the "angel and the devil" on Jags's shoulders. He continued by confirming that the romance provided opportunities for Jags to change for the better, explaining "having someone else giving him that positive influence opens his eyes and he starts realising that he could have a better life". "Trouble" was teased for the couple in early September 2020, as while Jags wanted to tell his mother about his new romance, Habiba prefers to continue hiding it, especially from her sister Iqra (Priya Davdra). When Iqra walks in on them, Habiba would "hurt" Jags by making up an excuse to "hide the truth". When Jags eventually tells his family about the relationship, Adatia called it a "huge" moment and a "big step" for Jags because "he's never really had his own mind".

=== Departure and death ===
In September 2020, Adatia confirmed that Jags would be leaving the show in a "dark" and "dramatic" storyline the upcoming October as he would be "caught up in the scheming of his ruthless mum". The announcement marked Jags as the first member of the Panesar family to exit the serial. Details surrounding Jags's exit plot were later confirmed to involve a recent incident where Vinny attacked Martin Fowler (James Bye) and Suki's fury surrounding Jags and Habiba's relationship. Jags would be asked to help the family cover up the attack, struggling with the morality of doing so, leading to his mother betraying him. His sister Ash (Gurlaine Kaur Garcha) was teased to be left "horrified" by Suki's action. Adatia confirmed that Jags would exit as a direct result of going against Suki, as, like his father learned, "anyone that goes against her doesn't tend to fare so well". The actor also teased that Jags's exit story would only prove "just how far Suki will go to get her way". Adatia disclosed that as he had prior commitments to other projects, he was always aware that both his and Jags's time on the soap would be limited. When the COVID-19 pandemic hit and storylines were delayed, the actor decided to stay on EastEnders for slightly longer to ensure that the show "wrapped up Jags's storyline properly". Reflecting on his time on the soap, Adatia called it an "amazing journey".

Jags's exit storyline kicked off in the week beginning on the 5 October 2020, and showed Suki falsely reporting Jags, not Vinny, as Martin's attacker due to her disapproval of his relationship with Habiba. Sopal explained that Suki's motives for turning Jags in were born from anger, as his relationship with Habiba was "another thing that just tipped her over the edge". She continued by explaining that Jags's rebellion caused Suki to see him as the "weakest" member of the family, therefore he needed to be "taught a lesson". Sopal clarified that Suki's discovery of Jags's girlfriend made her panic that Jags would "not care about his family duties as much" as Suki believes "romance softens people", and opined that her character would have the same reaction if any of her other children were demonstrating similar behaviour. Jags made his final on-screen appearance in episode 6144, broadcast on 9 October 2020. Despite Habiba's best attempts to prove Jags's innocence, it was later revealed that Jags had been sentenced to four years in prison. On 24 June 2021, it was revealed that Jags had been killed in an off-screen prison attack after he got on the wrong side of a prison gang. As she was the one who falsely incriminated him, Suki was set to be "broken" by the death and his oncoming funeral.

== Storylines ==
Jags and his brother Kheerat (Jaz Deol) first arrive in Walford to confront Ben Mitchell (Max Bowden) after he steals Kheerat's car. They threaten him with retaliation unless the car is returned to them. When Ben fails to deliver, Jags kidnaps Lola Pearce (Danielle Harold), though he is berated by Kheerat for this and later lets her go after Ben comes to meet them and promises to repay them. A few weeks later, Jags and Kheerat, joined by their other brother Vinny (Shiv Jalota) arrive on the Square in search of their sister Ash Panesar (Gurlaine Kaur Garcha). While there, Jags recognises Chantelle Atkins (Jessica Plummer) waiting at a bus stop, and tells Kheerat that he used to have a crush on her at school, and that they once went on a date. The Panesar siblings later move to Walford and are eventually joined by their mother Suki (Balvinder Sopal). When Suki is revealed to have lied about having cancer, Jags is the first of the family to forgive her.

Jags gets close to and eventually enters a secret relationship with Habiba Ahmed (Rukku Nahar), though he fears Suki's reaction as Habiba is Muslim and Jags is Sikh, ultimately deciding against going public. In September 2020, Vinny attacks Martin Fowler (James Bye) in a botched staged robbery, and Jags helps to clear up the evidence. After challenging his family's treatment of their tenants, Jags goes public about his relationship with Habiba. Enraged, Suki hands Jags' bloody jeans into the police, telling them he attacked Martin. Jags is wrongfully arrested and reluctantly agrees to plead guilty for the crime. He is sentenced to 4 years in prison. Months later, the Panesar family learn that Jags has gotten on the wrong side of a gang in prison, and Kheerat makes an agreement with Ben to arrange protection for him. Meanwhile, Habiba gives birth to Jags' son, Tyrion, off-screen. Kheerat remains hopeful for Jags' welfare, however Ben later cancels the protection in an act of rage. Shortly afterwards, in June 2021, the Panesars learn that Jags had been beaten to death in an attack in his cell.

== Reception ==
When it was revealed that Jags had a past connection to Chantelle Atkins (Jessica Plummer), Stephen Patterson of the Metro speculated Jags being involved in Chantelle's escape from her abusive husband Gray Atkins (Toby-Alexander Smith) and looked forward to seeing how their connection would be explored in upcoming episodes. Patterson later deemed the first kiss between Jags and Habiba a "shock passion". His colleague, Calli Kitson, called Habiba's excuse to protect the secrecy of the relationship "cruel". Claire Crick of What's On TV expressed sympathy for Jags after Suki falsely reported him as Martin's attacker. Will Twigger of the Daily Mirror reported that viewers noticed a plot hole in the storyline, as when Suki turned in Vinny's bloody jeans, claiming them to be Jags's, the police should have noticed that they were too small to belong to Jags as the brothers were noticeably different sizes. Twigger's colleague Kyle O'Sullivan commented that the decision to write in Jags's off-screen death was "controversial" and added that fans had hoped he would return to the role. Laura Denby of Radio Times described Jags as a "kind soul" and deemed his death "brutal" and "harrowing".
