= Nish Panesar =

Fictional character from EastEnders

- EastEnders character
- Portrayed by: Navin Chowdhry
- Duration: 2022–2026
- First appearance: Episode 6565; 29 September 2022
- Last appearance: Episode 7258; 8 January 2026
- Introduced by: Chris Clenshaw (2022); Ben Wadey (2026)
In-universe information
- Other names: Nishandeep Panesar
- Occupation: Businessman; Café owner
- Family: Panesar
- Wife: Suki Panesar (until 2024)
- Sons: Ravi Gulati; Kheerat Panesar; Jags Panesar; Vinny Panesar
- Daughters: Ash Panesar
- Grandsons: Davinder "Nugget" Gulati; Tyrion Ahmed
- Granddaughters: Avani Nandra-Hart

Nish Panesar is a fictional character from the BBC soap opera EastEnders, played by Navin Chowdhry. After being mentioned multiple times beforehand, Nish made his first appearance in episode 6565, broadcast on 29 September 2022. It was confirmed that Chowdhry had begun filming before the announcement of his casting on 28 August 2022. Billed as "ice-cold" and "manipulative", Nish is introduced as the estranged mentally abusive and controlling husband of Suki Panesar (Balvinder Sopal) and the father of Kheerat (Jaz Deol), Jags (Amar Adatia), Ash (Gurlaine Kaur Garcha), and Vinny Panesar (Shiv Jalota). He is later revealed to also be the father of Ravi Gulati (Aaron Thiara) in a twist. Since his introduction, Nish's storylines have focused on his attempts to rebuild relationships with his family, the crumbling of his marriage to Suki, a feud with Suki's lover Eve Unwin (Heather Peace), being in a coma during "The Six" storyline, a fling with Kat Slater (Jessie Wallace), suffering from viral myocarditis, learning the truth of The Six's murder and falsely confessing to the crime resulting in his arrest, and escaping from prison.

In September 2024, it was announced that Chowdhry would exit the show ahead of the 40th anniversary celebrations, with the character departing in episode 7006, broadcast on 31 October 2024 after being arrested. Chowdhry made an unannounced return to the role in episode 7023, broadcast on 2 December. Nish's story sees him plot to ruin Eve and Suki's upcoming wedding. When the wedding arrives in episode 7041, broadcast on 1 January 2025, Nish tries to kill Denise and Eve, before revealing he plans to die with Suki. However, after Ravi learns Nish hurt Denise, he pushes Nish off the hotel balcony. In the following episode, broadcast on 2 January 2025, it was confirmed that Nish had been killed off, with his final scene showing him being zipped into a body bag. Chowdhry reprised his role over a year later on 7 January 2026, appearing as a hallucination when Ravi is spiked by Nicola Mitchell (Laura Doddington).

Nish's role as a villain received mixed reviews from critics for depraved actions. While Peter Hart of OK! praised Nish for quickly becoming a "memorable rogue" on the show, and Johnathon Hughes of Radio Times commended the character as one of the most heinous in the show's history, Hughes' co-worker Laura Denby criticised Nish for his behaviour and lack of redeeming traits and Amber-Louise Large of MyLondon labelled him as the most divisive member of his family. With Nish having been declared "one of the soap's biggest villains", Chowdhry has been vocal about how much he enjoys his role, but has admitted concerns about how playing the character could affect his public image. For his portrayal, Chowdhry won the award for the Best Villain at the 2024 Radio Times Soap Awards and the 2025 British Soap Awards Villain of the year"

== Development ==
=== Casting and introduction ===
After being mentioned multiple times on the soap as the patriarch of the Panesar family, Chowdhry's casting as Nish was announced on 28 August 2022. It was further confirmed that he had already begun filming at the time. Nish would arrive after being imprisoned for two decades, and due to having spent so much time in prison, Chowdhry teased that Nish would arrive feeling "pained and wronged" due to missing out on his children growing up, adding that Nish "believes he's owed by the world and by his family for the time he's done in prison", explaining his determination to rebuild relationships, including his marriage to Suki. On his casting, Chowdhry commented that since he had never worked on a soap before EastEnders, the experience was new for him. However, he was interested in the storylines given to him upon his debut. He particularly vented interest in his onscreen family and liked that "there's so much happening at all times" in the Panesar unit. He found Nish to be an interesting and unconventional character, which he teased would bring "drama and mayhem" and cause "turmoil" for the Panesars. He added: "I'm excited to join in and set off a few more explosions and fireworks".

Executive producer Chris Clenshaw echoed Chowdhry's excitement for the character's debut since Nish had been referenced numerous times prior to his arrival on the series. Clenshaw continued in an announcement: "The spectre of Nish Panesar is finally here, and it's been a pleasure welcoming Navin [Chowdhry] to the cast, and take to the role so effortlessly. He brings something to the character that none of us could've predicted – his dynamic on and off-screen, and we're excited to see where his character develops as the story grows". Chowdhry was told by Clenshaw that Nish was a highly anticipated character as he was the "one missing piece of the puzzle" in regards to the Panesar family. When discussing Nish, Chowdhry commented that he enjoyed playing a villainous character, explaining: "I enjoy being evil. And we have a good time on set. They often say the best fun you have is when you're doing the darkest stuff". His introduction was labelled a "big storm" by Radio Times. Chowdhry believed Nish was an important character to show on TV, as his mother ran a charity for victims of domestic abuse, with Chowdhry hoping Nish could spread awareness of domestic violence, commenting: "I'm now playing a character that my mum spent her life's work saving people from. You need to create characters like Nish to show how hateful and destructive this behaviour is".

=== Characterisation ===
Nish is Suki's mentally abusive and controlling husband, and was imprisoned for 20 years for murdering a man he believed Suki was having an affair with. Upon his announcement, Digital Spy's Daniel Kilkelly described Nish as a charming and charismatic character, but it was noted that viewers would quickly notice that he is "ice-cold, manipulative and driven by a need for power and respect". Chowdhry commented that Nish is "manipulative, clever and intuitive", that he "doesn't believe someone can get one over on him", and has a habit of "blaming everyone but himself". He reckoned that the only person who could get one over on Nish was Suki, despite controlling her life. Radio Times described Nish as described Nish as a "dangerous character to be on the wrong side of". Nish "rule[s] over his businesses and family with an iron fist". Chowdhry has opined that beneath Nish's depraved persona, there is a good man, but when asked if other residents of Walford should fear Nish's arrival, responded: "no one is in danger... unless they cross him". Chowdhry commented that Nish is someone who is intolerant of "any kind of betrayal or deceit or disloyalty", despite his own actions to others. Chowdhry has detailed that his character is "obsessed with control" and the idea of Nish being cheated on makes him "paranoid", "jealous", and "possessive". Nish has been described as "explosive", "troublesome", "evil", a "villain" or "baddie", "abusive", "controlling", and a man who "can't take no for an answer".

=== Discovering Suki's affair ===
In November 2023, Clenshaw announced that when Nish discovers Suki's affair with Eve Unwin (Heather Peace), "all hell will break loose", with Nish's reaction being angry and vengeful. He was also announced to "fly into a rage" after discovering the affair. In an interview with Inside Soap, Chowdhry teased that "Eve is playing with fire" and that it "would not be a pretty day in Walford" when Nish finds out. Chowdhry believed that Nish "totally adored Suki", and that it was a "dagger to his heart" to discover her affair. About the discovery, Clenshaw teased that "Nish will find out about [Suki] and Eve", but was intentionally vague about other details as he explained that "everyone's desperate to find out how Nish is going to react". Sopal described Suki's marriage to Nish as having "no love" as the relationship "died a long time ago when she saw him for who he really was". She described Nish's love as "toxic" as it "comes with conditions, control and [is] driven by his needs, wants and passions".

Chowdhry teased that Nish would be "consumed by jealous rage" upon the discovery because he saw it as the ultimate betrayal, explaining: "It's a betrayal because it's humiliating and degrading, for someone as obsessed with control as him, to think that something's going on behind his back – especially when it involves someone like his wife" and that "the idea that his wife was able to hide that from him when he thought he was absolutely in control of her, her feelings and her actions – it's the biggest blow. It harks back to the reason why he went to prison in the first place – he went there for killing a man in a jealous, love-blind rage – and now he has evidence that it's happened again". He added that Nish's anger would be "off the scale" and that it would be the angriest viewers had ever seen him.

=== Involvement with The Six ===
Following a flash-forward sequence in February 2023, showing a seemingly dead body on the floor of The Queen Victoria public house at Christmas, Nish was one of the most suspected characters of being the body. The storyline became known as "The Six", referring to the six female characters who were suspected to be the murderer. "The Seven" was a list of seven male potential victims, with Nish's inclusion being announced on 7 December 2023. Nish's inclusion was justified due to his abusive behaviour towards Suki, attempting to get Suki's lover, Eve, killed, having a connection with each female character suspected to be the killer, and having spent much of the year being a local menace.

Chowdhry voiced his awareness that many people wanted Nish to die at Christmas, saying "It's well documented how many people want Nish dead". He added that Nish's violent temper could be the catalyst for being the murder victim, saying that "Nish is so paranoid, so jealous and possessive that the idea of Suki being with anyone else is beyond him" and that it is "humiliating and degrading for him" to be cheated on. Chowdhry commented in a New! magazine interview that Nish had been "the number one suspect for a very long time". A Radio Times poll revealed that fans believed Nish was the most likely of "the seven" to be killed, with 33% fans believing he was going to die.

"The Six" storyline unfolded on Christmas Day 2023, where it is revealed that Nish was the body on the floor after being struck across the head with a champagne bottle by Denise Fox (Diane Parish); however, he did not die and was simply unconscious, with the actual death being Keanu Taylor (Danny Walters). Being hit by the bottle resulted in Nish being knocked unconscious and entering an induced coma. After waking up from the coma, Nish slowly began to regain his memory. Chowdhry detailed that "Nish's mission in life at this stage is to find out exactly what happened", detailing that it was for both a desire to seek retribution for what happened to him, as he wasn't sold by the cover story made by the six, and to regain control of the situation. When Nish became sure that the six were hiding something, so bribed Suki into handing businesses over to him, which Chowdhry considered to be Nish's way of "re-establish his authority on everything and everyone around him".

=== Fling with Kat Mitchell ===
They are both hurting, and through the pain they're experiencing find a great comfort in each other. In situations like this, people grow close very quickly – and you have these two characters who, against all the odds, find themselves in each other's company, and that is healing for them at first.

— Chowdhry discussing Nish and Kat's fling.

While Nish recovered from his amnesia, he begin a relationship with Kat Mitchell (Jessie Wallace), who had just discovered her husband Phil (Steve McFadden) had cheated on her with Emma Harding (Patsy Kensit). Commenting on the romantic twist involving Nish and Kat, Chowdhry admitted it was a "surprise" for both him and Wallace, teasing "it's something that will goes places", adding that "there is something quite big coming up" for the couple.

Chowdhry called for more scenes between Nish and Phil, adding that "Nish isn't bothered about anybody, and he certainly isn't bothered about Phil. I think he relishes in the antagonism and it’s a challenge for Nish which he feels totally ready for, but whether he is or not is something else. He doesn't fear Phil at all but there is an argument to suggest that he should" and that he believed a feud between the characters would be popular among audiences. Discussing the relationship with Kat, Chowdhry opined that "initially with Nish and Kat, there was a genuine attraction of two people in similar situations. There was a common ground over which they bonded genuinely. But Nish, being the manipulative opportunist that he is, saw a wonderful prize at the end of it [Phil's money and businesses]. I think there was an affection at first that then transformed into an opportunity for him". Adding that he feels the only way Nish is able to take his breakup is to harm Suki, the actor teased that Nish would be playing a "long game" for his revenge. After Kat breaks up with Nish, he calls the police on her cousin Stacey Slater (Lacey Turner) as revenge, a move which Chowdhry considered a "desperate backup plan".

=== Viral myocarditis ===
It was reported on 10 May 2024 that Nish would return "with a bombshell" following nearly three months of absence. It was later revealed that the return would entail Nish claiming he was dying of a terminal illness, being turned away by the Panesars, which Chowdhry opined as "an indication of what Nish is capable of", and being rushed to hospital after an altercation with Ravi. Chowdhry added that Nish's primary motivation for going back to Walford was to support his grandchildren because he was imprisoned during the early lives of his own children. He went on to say that it would be "up for debate" how honest Nish's claims of wanting to rebuild bridges and the reality of his illness were. The show revealed that Nish's claims of illness were true, that he had viral myocarditis and mere weeks left to live.

Chowdhry warned that Nish would "not go quietly", stating that: "It's up to the viewers what they choose to believe, but if illness is going to consume Nish, then he's not going to go quietly. Look at what he did when he was of good health – he behaved so recklessly and had no moral compass. There were no limits beforehand, imagine if he knew people are betraying him behind the scenes – he's got nothing to lose and could be more dangerous than he's ever been". Chowdhry appreciated the challenges that came with trying to elicit sympathy for a wicked character, and explained that if Nish was being truthful and didn't have much time left, "he genuinely wants to reconnect and seek redemption" as he had missed so much family time throughout his life. The actor continued teasing that Nish's true health was ambiguous. Chowdhry described Nish's illness as a "currency" for the character, whether he was dying or not, as "it's a perverse card to play, but Nish will use any tool at his disposal for his own gain". Fascinated by Nish's current state as "weak and a shadow of his former self", he admitted that when he was cast, he aimed to add humanity to his character.

=== Family betrayals and revenge ===
In August 2024, Chowdhry teased that, after Nish discovers Suki and Vinny had been manipulating him, Nish would be "the most visceral that we've seen him". He commented on his initial excitement after learning about the storyline and described it as "another way to convey his villainy". The actor teased that Nish would be armed with "different tactics" to ensure he can "achieve what he wants". Chowdhry continued: "He has spent most of his time since he's been back causing hell for everyone else, and suddenly he's been dealt the harshest card. So for him to cope with that and then react in the way that he needs to try and still be on top and still win is just a really interesting dynamic that I don't think anyone saw coming". Nish sets his sights on Vinny for his revenge. Chowdhry detailed that, although Nish would gain sympathy from his family due to his ill condition, thus spending more time with his family, that there was no relationship between his character and Suki.

The following October, Chowdhry teased that viewers should expect the "worst" to come from his character in the near future. He explained that as Nish is "ruthless and self-centred to the cost of everybody that gave him another chance", he would be willing to throw anyone under the bus for personal gain. It was also announced that Nish would discover the truth of what happened at Christmas 2023 during the upcoming Halloween. Chowdhry teased that Nish would unintentionally find "nuggets of information" and become suspicious of The Six's actions and mannerisms, which caused him to find out the truth. He added that Nish's reaction to the news would be "a mixture of disbelief and horror" and he would be vengeful about those who nearly caused his death having walked free, with the actor opining that Nish would likely use the situation to his advantage. The actor teased that discovering the truth about The Six was not Nish's only Halloween storyline: "He's got one massive trick up his sleeve that I don't think anyone could expect. Nobody can see the hand he’s going to play, and no one can imagine what he has in store on Halloween night". Following scenes of Nish blackmailing Suki by making her get back together with him, Chowdhry and Sopal appeared on The One Show to discuss it. Chowdhry said revenge was Nish's primary motive and having incriminating information on The Six made him feel "powerful". He concluded by warning viewers that Nish intended to utilise the power he realised.

=== Halloween departure ===
On 15 September 2024, it was reported that Chowdhry had been tipped for his exit from the soap, in what were teased by an insider to be "very impactful and dramatic" scenes. The nature of the character's exit was initially kept a secret, but Chowdhry disclosed that he was "really excited" after learning of his character's fate. An insider commented that "Navin [Chowdhry] has made quite the impact on the show in the two years he has been a part of it, especially as a key part of the huge Christmas storyline with The Six. He'll be missed by cast, crew and viewers alike." Nish departed in episode 7006, airing on 31 October 2024.

=== Nish's final act ===
Nish returned in prison scenes in episode 7023, broadcast on 2 December 2024. The character was set to return to enact "nuclear revenge" on Suki for going ahead with plans to marry Eve, despite making a deal with her that if he took the blame for killing Keanu, that wouldn't happen. Clenshaw teased that Nish's revenge would come over New Years' Day, the day Suki and Eve's wedding would take place, the show's first-ever lesbian wedding. He added that Ravi would be a key figure in the story and that it would be Nish's "final act of vengeance". In a BBC interview, Sopal explained that despite Suki's excitement to be wed, Nish's presence was hanging over her during the ceremony. The actress continued: "Not just her, the whole family as this is a really lovely moment for everyone involved, and Nish has the potential to totally rip that from under her feet. Everyone is bracing themselves as Nish has a vendetta". During the show's broadcasts on 1 and 2 January 2025, Nish dies after unsuccessfully trying to kill Denise, Eve, and Suki, before he is pushed off a hotel roof by Ravi and dies.

Nish's final episode was filmed in reverse over almost twenty days, with Chowdhry's final scene being one where Ravi interrogates Nish. Chowdhry noted a "full circle" parallel between the first scene he filmed and the last, as both involve Ravi interrogating Nish. Chowdhry found filming his final scenes emotional, saying that the character "meant the world" to him. According to Clenshaw, across Nish's 212-episode run, the character broke the record for the most attempted murders of their own family members in EastEnders.

== Storylines ==
After Nish gets released from prison, his wife Suki (Balvinder Sopal) meets Nish in person and he convinces her to try their marriage again. But in order to ensure that Nish leaves Walford permanently and they may live happily ever after, Suki and Eve Unwin (Heather Peace) begin an affair and conspire against him. Nish accuses Suki of having an affair with Mitch Baker (Roger Griffiths), and he threatens to kill Suki again if she cheats again. In response, Suki angrily confesses that she has never loved him. Infuriated, Nish declares that Suki is his and always will be, regardless of the circumstances. Later that evening, when Vinny (Shiv Jalota), Nish's son, arrives home, he finds Suki unconscious at the foot of the stairs and an irate Nish standing over her. Nish is detained for ABH but is quickly released.

After Kathy (Gillian Taylforth) and Tom "Rocky" Cotton (Brian Conley) move into one of Nish's apartments, Rocky approaches Nish for a loan, which Nish grants, but stipulates that he must pay it back. When the time comes for Rocky to pay Nish his first installment, Nish warns him not to keep him waiting or he will tell Kathy about Rocky's debts. Nish then threatens Rocky persistently, doubling his interest rate on the loan. In an attempt to solve his issues, Rocky sets fire to Kathy's café in an insurance scam to pay off the money, causing it to explode and seriously injure Kathy's grandsons, Peter (Thomas Law) and Bobby Beale (Clay Milner Russell). Afterwards, Nish approaches Rocky and says that out of good will, the debt is cancelled, but that he knows Rocky burnt down the café, and blackmails him for the plot of land or everybody will learn the truth.

Nish catches Suki and Eve kissing on the Minute Mart CCTV and is horrified to learn about the affair. When he gets home, Nish texts Eve on Suki's phone, telling her to meet. Upon arrival, Nish tells Eve that he knows about the affair, and when Eve picks up her bag to leave, Nish viciously strikes Eve in the face with a champagne bottle, sending her unconscious. Nish then drags Eve into the kitchen as his son Ravi Gulati (Aaron Thiara) arrives. Nish orders Ravi to kill Eve, which he agrees to after Nish guilt trips him. They drag her to the boot of a car and Ravi then drives it to a private location. When Eve wakes up, Ravi spares her life under the condition that she must leave Walford forever and act as dead, to which Eve agrees. Upon Ravi's return, he tells Nish that Eve is dead, to Nish's pleasure. Nish and Ravi later arrested for the 'murder' of Eve but are released when it is discovered that Eve is alive.

On Christmas Day 2023, Nish is violent during dinner to Ravi and Suki for helping hide Eve, so Suki leaves the house and later calls Nish to talk in private in The Queen Victoria public house. At the pub, Suki is accompanied by five other women who refuse to leave her alone with Nish. Nish pleads with Suki to give him another chance, but when she replies that she cannot bear to look at him, Nish grabs her and attempts to drag her away but the women defend her, with Denise Fox (Diane Parish) striking Nish over the head with a champagne bottle, which knocks Nish unconscious. The next day, Nish is rushed to hospital and placed into an induced coma. When he wakes, he admits that he cannot remember what happened that night, so Suki tells him a fabricated story about Keanu Taylor (Danny Walters), whom the women later murdered and hid the body of, attacking Nish and running away.

After Kat Mitchell (Jessie Wallace) is cheated on by her husband, Phil (Steve McFadden), she starts a relationship with Nish. During this, Nish's memory slowly returns as he begins to remember titbits of what happened at Christmas. He confronts several of the women who were there on what happened that night, and while they don't reveal anything, they act suspiciously. Nish then threatens to go to the police unless Suki signs all their businesses over to him. Suki agrees, as long as he leaves her something small. Despite the deal, Nish remains determined to find the truth and invites Suki over for dinner, only to be served with divorce papers which he rips up. He continues to intensely interrogate the women who were there that night, so to stop him, Suki gives in and lets Nish have it all. Nish reopens Bridge Street Café as "Nish's".

Nish kicks Kat and her kids out of his flat after they break up. After deciding to give things another try, Nish employs attorney Roger Peel (Ben Jones) to "help" Kat with her divorce from Phil and share of the businesses. Roger advises Kat to move her businesses into a different name in order to keep them, but Kat sees through Roger's scheme to give Nish ownership of her companies. After that, Suki and Kat blackmail Roger, and Nish eventually admits his real motivation for manipulating Kat. When he turns aggressive, Suki and Eve intervene to save Kat, and she escapes. In revenge, Nish falsely reports Stacey Slater (Lacey Turner) as his attacker at Christmas, but withdraws the accusation. When Suki tries to settle things with Nish, he gets angry and tries strangling her. That evening, Nish orders her to leave, only to be told by the family that Suki has been granted his businesses before Nish is disowned for his violence.

Three months later, Nish returns, to the shock of the family who instantly turn him away before Nish proclaims that he is dying of viral myocarditis, explaining he wants to rebuild bridges with the family, or at least his grandchildren. After an altercation with Ravi, Nish is rushed to hospital and is told that he is in desperate need for a heart transplant or he will die within months. When his family continue to refuse Nish's apologies, he sells the café back to Kathy for £1 in revenge and threatening to write them out of his will. Vinny later says he forgives Nish, but it is revealed that it is a plan concocted by Suki to ensure they get as much money from Nish as they can before his death. Once Nish figures out the scheme, he unsuccessfully attempts to kill Vinny. Nish later collapses and is hospitalised, with his survival being unlikely. He wills his businesses to his grandchildren Nugget (Juhaim Rasul Choudhury) and Avani (Aaliyah James).

After Kathy accidentally reveals that Linda murdered Keanu and was helped by the women in covering it up, Nish uses the situation to blackmail Suki by making her leave Eve and remarry him in exchange for him giving a false confession to the police, taking credit for Keanu's murder. Nish and Suki quickly marry, but he later overhears Suki tell Stacey about her eagerness to leave Nish once he is imprisoned; he then refuses to give the false confession, deciding instead to stay in Walford with Suki until his death. That night, he attempts to rape Suki but she is saved by Stacey, Nugget, and Avani. Nish realises that Suki will never love him, so, having a change of heart upon realising he is at death's door, he confesses to killing Keanu and framing Dean; as he is arrested, Nish begs Suki to not marry Eve. Vinny is subsequently informed that Nish has been charged and remanded into custody, pending the trial.

In early December, Nish pleads guilty to Keanu's murder, but is horrified when he overhears Eve and Suki together during a phone-call with Nugget; he thus realises the two have reconciled. Subsequent to this, his family are informed that his condition has severely deteriorated and that he is being transferred to a hospice. After failing to convince Ravi to prevent the wedding, Nish arranges for armed men to rescue him as he is being transferred to the hospice; the armed men take him to Walford. Nugget eventually discovers that Nish is hiding in a dilapidated house in Walford, with Nish using this to his advantage by emotionally blackmailing Nugget into delivering food to the house, allowing him to begin preparations to sabotage Suki and Eve's wedding.

Several days before the wedding, police inform the Panesars that they believe Nish is in Walford, resulting in Suki calling off the wedding, fearing Nish will return in order to scupper it. Nugget informs Nish of this during one of his food runs, and Nish, wanting to proceed with his plan to sabotage the wedding, convinces Nugget to plant several articles of his clothing near a lake before calling the police to say that Nish has been seen entering the lake; as a result, Nish is presumed dead by the police and Suki decides to reverse her decision about the wedding. The night before the wedding, Nish attempts to lure Eve from her hen party to stab her; however, this fails when he suffers a mini-heart attack. Upon being revived by Nugget and the prison doctor, Nish obtains a dangerous substance and arranges for a taxi to take him to the wedding venue the next day.

On the day of the wedding, Denise follows Nugget when visiting Nish and discovers he is alive. She tells him she will call the police, and when threatening her doesn't work, he hits her over the head with a champagne bottle, leaving her unconscious. He then takes a cab to the wedding venue, but is intercepted by Vinny and Ravi. They hold him in a warehouse, but when he reveals what happened to Denise, Ravi leaves and desperately calls Jack to help her. Nish then escapes and makes his way to the honeymoon suite. Once there, he poisons Eve's champagne glass, and she begins to choke, seemingly dying with Suki looking on helplessly.

He then pours the rest of the poison in two glasses, one for him, and one for Suki, and reveals that he plans for them to die together. Horrified, Suki runs out onto the balcony with Nish following. As she screams to the guests below for help, he hits her in the face. Ravi soon arrives on the balcony, and Nish goads him about his feelings for Denise, until Ravi snaps and pushes him from the balcony. He grabs onto Suki's wedding dress, and they both fall from the balcony. Suki survives the fall but Nish succumbs to his injuries.

== Reception ==
Upon his first scenes, Lea Dzifa Seeberg of MyLondon wrote that fans were "delighted" that Nish had joined the show, but were puzzled about the reveal that he is the father of Ravi, as many believed Chowdhry looked too young. Laura Denby of Radio Times called the reveal a "bombshell". In October 2022, Alice Penwill from Inside Soap wrote that, by that point, "Nish has already stirred up life for the Panesars – and the whole of Walford, for that matter". Denby (Radio Times) noted that Nish and Dean Wicks (Matt Di Angelo) were the two characters of "The Seven" who people most wanted to be brought to justice "one way or another", adding that Nish was a "control freak" and was "growing more toxic by the day". She further added that Nish was "a chilling presence in Walford" and "irredeemable". Sophie Dainty of Digital Spy reported that Nish's "nefarious" actions had "infuriated" fans of the show, noting that many hoped for his comeuppance. MyLondon's Amber-Louise Large labelled Nish as "the least liked Panesar".

Inside Soap editor Gary Gillatt speculated that Nish would be the 2023 Christmas Day victim due to his close connections to five of "The Six". After it was revealed that his character wasn't the victim of the Christmas Day 2023 murder, Chowdhry apologized to fans for Nish's survival, commenting that he was "aware that everyone wanted [Nish] to die at Christmas" and apologising "to the audience that [he's] still around". He added that he has been somewhat "scared" to play Nish at times due to fears that it will affect his public image, explaining: "There have been moments when we've had scenes and I'll speak to the producer and I'll say, 'I'm going to have to go on the school run and you're making me beat up every woman on Albert Square'". Nish was referred to by co-star Brian Conley as a "great" villain. Lewis Knight of Radio Times described Nish as "one of Walford's most dastardly villains". In May 2024, Peter Hart of OK! commented that Nish had "quickly [become] a memorable rogue in the series". Johnathon Hughes of Radio Times opined that "nasty Nish Panesar ranks pretty highly as one of the most despicable rogues" in the show's history. Hughes also praised that Nish's illness, weather true or not, helped bring "a new dimension" to the character and praised Chowdhry for bringing "many chilling moments" to the show.

When Nish's exit from the soap was announced, the circumstances for the character's exit were highly speculated among viewers. Denby noted that audiences were aware the character had a "shelf life" since his introduction and listed the most common theories presented as a death in hospital as a result of his illness, being murdered, dying in prison, a last-minute medical transplant saving his life, and a showdown with Kheerat in prison. Denby later wrote that Nish's revenge plot against his family was a "chilling" and "dark" storyline which took a "sinister turn". Daly considered a cliffhanger in the storyline to be "terrifying". The scene where Nish confesses to orchestrating an attack on Eve's elderly mother was described as "chilling" by Manchester Evening News writer Joe Crutchley. Crutchley deemed the fan reaction "livid" and opined that Nish had become "one of the soap's biggest villains". Denby also called Nish "one of the soap's biggest villains", calling the character "chilling" and "unforgettable". In February 2025, Radio Times ranked Nish as the best EastEnders villain of all time, with Laura Denby writing that viewers "loved to hate Nasty Nish", but that "we'll always hail Chowdhry's performances as iconic" and credited Nish with keeping the show "at the top of its game 40 years on from its debut".

For his role, Chowdhry won the award for the "Best Villain" at the 2024 Radio Times soap awards. He was also longlisted for "Best Villain" at the 2024 Inside Soap Awards.
