= Navin Chowdhry =

British actor (born 1971)

- Born: 22 November 1971 (age 54); Bristol, England
- Education: Imperial College London
- Occupation: Actor
- Height: 173 cm (5 ft 8 in)

Navin Chowdhry (born 22 November 1971) is an English actor. He is best known for his roles in Teachers and A Touch of Cloth, and his role as Nish Panesar in the BBC soap opera EastEnders.

== Early life ==
Chowdhry is of Indian origin. He was born and brought up in Bristol, England. He is the son of Simi Chowdhry, a well-known female activist. In 1994, he graduated from Imperial College London with an upper second-class honours degree in biochemistry.

== Career ==
At age 16, Chowdhry made his acting debut in the 1988 film Madame Sousatzka with Shabana Azmi and Shirley MacLaine.

His next major role was as IT teacher Kurt McKenna in the successful comedy show Teachers in 2001–2003, and then PC Sanjay Singh in Dalziel and Pascoe. He also appeared as a possible rapist in Judge John Deed.

Chowdhry appeared as the psychologically affected "Rainman" in series 3, episode 3 ("Breaking Glass") of Waking the Dead. He then starred in the Channel 4 drama series NY-LON as Raph.

On 30 October 2005, he appeared on stage at The Old Vic in the one-night play Night Sky alongside Christopher Eccleston, Bruno Langley, David Warner, Saffron Burrows and David Baddiel. In 2005, he made a guest appearance in Doctor Who, then starring Christopher Eccleston as The Doctor, in which he was strangled by a Slitheen in the episode "Aliens of London". In 2006, he appeared in the BBC Three drama series Sinchronicity, playing Mani.

In 2009, he appeared in two episodes of the Channel 4 series Free Agents and featured in Skellig. In 2010, he starred in the BBC television pilot Reunited, playing Danny.

Chowdhry has also produced projects such as the award-winning short film This Bastard Business and a short play called Mashed.

He played Anwar in the critically acclaimed 2015 BBC TV series Doctor Foster. In 2016, he played Sonny Desai in the first episode of series 18 of Midsomer Murders.

Chowdhry portrayed Nodin Chavdri in the 2017 film Star Wars: The Last Jedi.

In 2019, he appeared in Sarah Rutherford's play The Girl Who Fell at Trafalgar Studios.

In 2022, Chowdhry began playing the previously unseen and imprisoned Nish Panesar in EastEnders. Nish, a manipulative psychopath, first appeared during the final stages of his 20-year prison sentence and was released shortly thereafter. He played the role for more than two years until January 2025, when his character was killed-off. In 2025, Chowdhry won the British Soap Award for "Villain of the Year" for his portrayal of Nish.

== Filmography ==
=== Film ===
Year	Title	Role
1988	Madame Sousatzka	Manek Sen
1989	King of the Wind	Agba
1991	The Dove's Lost Necklace	Hassan
1993	The Seventh Coin	Salim
1998	Surviving Sabu	Amin
2000	Skin Deep	Norman
2000	This Bastard Business	Vinod
2001	On a Life's Edge	Peter
2001	Landmark	Jaswinder
2002	Bhangra Heads	Hari
2003	Teachers Series 3: Behind the Scenes	Himself
2004	Seafood	Naveen
2007	A Chaat in the Park	Mahir
2008	NY-LON	Raph
2009	Skellig: The Owl Man	Mr Watson
2010	Reunited	Danny
2015	I Love NY	Ishan
2016	Ferried	Ahmed
2017	With Love from Calais	Nav
2017	Star Wars: Episode VIII – The Last Jedi	Resistance Cargo Pilot
2018	Sara Pascoe vs. Monogamy	Himself
2023	The Effects of Lying	Harvinder
2023	Wake Up	Sonny

=== Television ===
Year	Title	Role	Notes
1993	London's Burning	Rasheed	Episode: "Series 6, episode 2"
1994	Schwarz greift ein	Rawi	Episode: "Blinde Wut"
1995	Crown Prosecutor	Raj Kapoor	Episode: "Series 1, episode 9"
1996	Casualty	Zafar	Episode: "Land of Hope"
1996	Gulliver's Travels	Prince Munodi	Episode: "Series 1, episode 2"
1997	Ruth Rendell Mysteries	Amal	Episode: "The Double"
1997	Insiders	Jonathan Mason	Episode: "Offending Behaviour"
1997	The English Programme	Prince Munodi	2 episodes
1997	Dalziel and Pascoe	PC Sanjay Singh	4 episodes
1998	Animated World Faiths	Balarama	Episode: "The Childhood of Krishna"
2000	City Central	Tim Anand	Episode: "History"
2001	Judge John Deed	Colin Gee	Episode: "Rough Justice"
2001–2003	Teachers	Kurt McKenna	31 episodes
2002	Network East Late	Himself	Episode: "Series 2, episode 1"
2002	Animated Tales of the World	Pawel	Episode: "The Flower of Fern: A Story from Poland"
2003	Waking the Dead	Rainman	2 episodes
2004	NY-LON	Raph	7 episodes
2005	The Paul O'Grady Show	Himself	Episode: "Series 3, episode 3"
2005	Doctor Who	Indra Ganesh	2 episodes
2005	New Tricks	Sgt. Pushkar Guha	Episode: "Family Business"
2005	The Golden Hour	Dr. Naz Osbourne	4 episodes
2006	Sinchronicity	Mani	6 episodes
2009	Free Agents	Raz	2 episodes
2010	Five Days	DC Bilal Choudry	2 episodes
2011	The Body Farm	Parvez Khan	Episode: "Series 1, episode 4"
2012	Mr Blue Sky	Rakesh Rathi	3 episodes
2012–2014	A Touch of Cloth	DC Asap Qureshi	6 episodes
2013	The Job Lot	Sunil Mitesh	Episode: "Series 1, episode 1"
2014	Babylon	Sgt. Adeel	3 episodes
2015	Doctor Foster	Anwar	3 episodes
2016	Midsomer Murders	Sonny Desai	Episode: "Habeas Corpus"
2017	The Replacement	Kieran	3 episodes
2017	The End of the F***ing World	Tony	5 episodes
2018	Next of Kin	Kareem Shirani	6 episodes
2018	Our Girl	Inspector Chowdhrey	4 episodes
2019	Death in Paradise	Andy Spriggs	Episode: "Wish You Weren't Here"
2019	Thunderbirds Are Go	Cameron	Episode: "Chain Reaction"
2020	Doctor Who Reviews	Indra Ganesh	Episode: "Is Doctor Who's 'Farting Alien' Episode a Secret Masterpiece?"
2020	McDonald & Dodds	Pete Wattal	Episode: "The Fall of the House of Crockett"
2020	Out of Her Mind	Steve	2 episodes
2021	Trying	Deven	5 episodes
2022–2026	EastEnders	Nish Panesar	213 episodes
2025	The Power of Parker	Ash	Episodes: "Thirsty Girl", "Trust The Process", "You Better Not Miss"
