= Rukku Nahar =

British actress (born 1996)

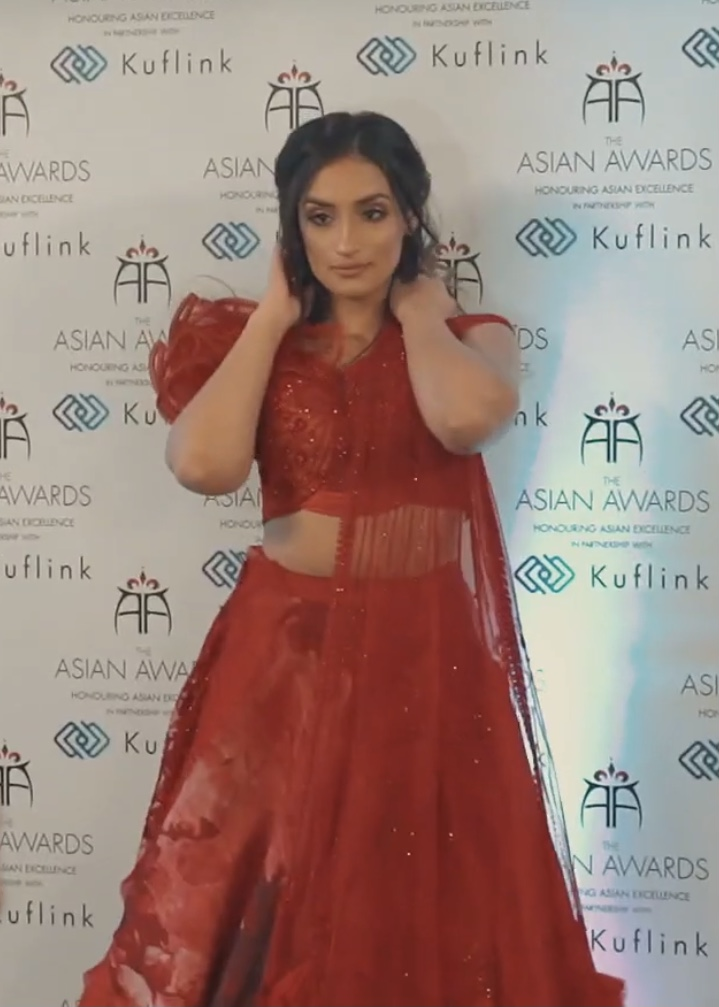
- Nahar in 2019
- Born: Rukku Priya Nahar; 28 February 1996 (age 30); Bedford, Bedfordshire, England
- Education: Hastingsbury Upper School
- Occupation: Actress
- Years active: 2014–present
- Television: Wolfblood; Hollyoaks; EastEnders

Rukku Priya Nahar (born 28 February 1996) is a British actress, known for her roles as Selina Khan on the CBBC series Wolfblood and Habiba Ahmed on the BBC soap opera EastEnders.

== Early life ==
Nahar was born on 28 February 1996 in Bedford, England. Nahar is British of Indian-Punjabi descent. Whilst growing up, Nahar attended Hastingsbury Upper School, and later trained at the Identity School of Acting.

== Career ==
In 2014, Nahar made her professional acting debut in an episode of the YouTube comedy series Corner Shop, as Meena. In 2016, she began portraying the role of Selina Khan in the CBBC drama series Wolfblood, a role she played for two series. Later in 2016, she appeared in an episode of the BBC medical drama Casualty. In 2017, she made her film debut in the adventure film We Can Be Heroes, as Zara Muhammed. In 2018, Nahar made an appearance in an episode of the BBC soap opera Doctors as Rana Khan. Later that year, she starred in nine episodes of the Channel 4 soap opera Hollyoaks, as Asha Kaur.

In February 2019, Nahar began appearing in the BBC soap opera EastEnders as series regular Habiba Ahmed. On 22 October 2020, Nahar made her final appearance as Habiba in previously unannounced scenes. Nahar confirmed her exit on Instagram, where she thanked EastEnders for teaching her "so much" during her tenure, and stated that she was "grateful" for the friendships she made on the programme. Following her exit, she appeared in two episodes of the BBC iPlayer series Flatmates, as well as featuring in an episode of the ITV series The Good Karma Hospital.

== Filmography ==
Year	Title	Role	Notes
2014	Corner Shop	Meena	Episode: "May the Best Man Win"
2016–2017	Wolfblood	Selina Khan	Main role; 19 episodes
2016	Casualty	Rosa Sarwar	Episode: "Chain Reaction"
2017	We Can Be Heroes	Zara Muhammed	Film
2018	Doctors	Rana Khan	Episode: "Monster Love"
2018	Hollyoaks	Asha Kaur	Recurring role; 9 episodes
2019–2020	EastEnders	Habiba Ahmed	Regular role
2021	Flatmates	Serena	2 episodes
2021	Blame	Aisha	Short film
2022	The Good Karma Hospital	Indu	1 episode
2023	The Buckingham Murders	Harleen	Film
