= MyLondon =

British news website

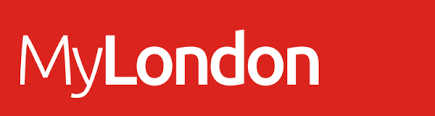
- Website type: News; Entertainment; Lifestyle
- Available in: English
- Owner: Reach plc
- Website: mylondon.news
- Commercial: Yes
- Launched: 2018
- Current status: Active

MyLondon is a British news website operated by Reach plc, publishers of the Daily Mirror, covering the wider London region.

MyLondon started publishing in December 2018 as a result of the online merging of two Reach publications: GetWestLondon, and the Croydon Advertiser. The website provides news and related content for the entire London region.

As of November 2021, MyLondon has at least 70 editorial staff and receives about 6.7 million unique UK visitors each month.
