= Gurlaine Kaur Garcha =

British actress

- Born: Gurlaine Kaur Sidhu; 20 September 1993 (age 33); Luton, Bedfordshire, England
- Other names: Gurlaine Sidhu; Gurlaine Garcha
- Years active: 2011–present

Gurlaine Kaur Sidhu or Garcha (born 20 September 1993) is an English actress. On television, she is known for her role as Ash Panesar in the BBC One soap opera EastEnders (2019–2023).

== Early life ==
Garcha was born in Luton to Kenyan-born parents of Punjabi Sikh heritage. Garcha attended St George's School, Harpenden. She was six years old when she took up taekwondo and later joined the Trenic TKD Academy in Yiewsley, West London.

== Career ==
Garcha first began acting at the age of 15, appearing in the boxing short film Counter Punch and auditioning for the E4 teen drama Skins, making it to the final 15 of 8,000 who auditioned for a role. She made her television debut in 2012 with guest appearances in episodes of the BBC One medical soap operas Holby City and Doctors. Garcha also auditioned for the Coronation Street role of Rana Habeeb.

In 2019, Garcha made her feature film debut with a small role in the coming-of-age comedy-drama Days of the Bagnold Summer. That same year, she joined the cast of the BBC One soap opera EastEnders as Dr Ashneet "Ash" Panesar (or Kaur), a member of the soap's Panesar family and Iqra Ahmed's love interest. Garcha had been inspired by EastEnders star Lacey Turner when studying drama herself. She took a temporary break from the soap in early 2022 to do charity work in Malawi. She exited the soap in March 2023.

== Filmography ==
Year	Title	Role	Notes
2011	Counter Punch		Short film
2012	Holby City	Hayah Amir	Episode: "Wolf's Clothing"
2012	Doctors	CJ Jaspal	Episode: "A Lighter Note"
2016	Liv	Nadia	Short film
2019	Daughter	Lilah	Short film
2019	Days of the Bagnold Summer	Receptionist	
2019–2023	EastEnders	Ash Panesar	159 episodes
2025	The Girlfriend	Shabana	Episode: #1.4
