= Louise Mitchell =

Fictional character from EastEnders

- EastEnders character
- Tilly Keeper as Louise Mitchell (2019)
- Portrayed by: Rachel Cox (2001–2003); Danni Bennatar (2008); Brittany Papple (2010); Tilly Keeper (2016–2020)
- Duration: 2001–2003, 2008, 2010, 2016–2020
- First appearance: Episode 2197; 6 November 2001
- Last appearance: Episode 6068; 24 January 2020
- Introduced by: John Yorke (2001); Diederick Santer (2008, 2010); Dominic Treadwell-Collins (2016)
- Brittany Papple as Louise Mitchell (2010)
In-universe information
- Family: Mitchell/Fowler
- Father: Phil Mitchell
- Mother: Lisa Fowler
- Stepfather: Mark Fowler
- Stepmother: Kate Mitchell; Sharon Watts; Kat Slater
- Half-brothers: Ben Mitchell; Raymond Dawkins; Albie Watts
- Daughters: Peggy Mitchell Jnr
- Grandfathers: Eric Mitchell
- Grandmothers: Peggy Mitchell
- Uncles: Grant Mitchell
- Aunts: Sam Mitchell
- Nieces: Lexi Pearce
- First cousins: Courtney Mitchell; Mark Fowler Jnr; Ricky Branning
- Other relatives: Aunt Sal; Ronnie Mitchell; Roxy Mitchell; Billy Mitchell; Lola Pearce; Will Mitchell; Janet Mitchell; Amy Mitchell

Louise Mitchell (also Fowler) is a fictional character from the BBC soap opera EastEnders, who has been played by four different actors since her on-screen birth on 6 November 2001. The character has been portrayed by Rachel Cox (2001–2003), Danni Bennatar (2008), Brittany Papple (2010) and Tilly Keeper (2016–2020). Keeper's casting was announced on 16 December 2015, and she made her first appearance on 15 January 2016. Keeper's departure was announced in December 2019 which aired on 24 January 2020.

Louise is a member of the Mitchell family and was briefly part of the Fowler family. She is the daughter of Phil Mitchell (Steve McFadden) and Lisa Shaw (Lucy Benjamin), former stepdaughter of Sharon Watts (Letitia Dean), granddaughter of Peggy Mitchell (Barbara Windsor) and the half-sister of Ben Mitchell (Charlie Jones/Harry Reid/Max Bowden). Louise's early storylines include Lisa lying about her paternity; her nearly being killed in a road collision caused by Phil's archenemy Steve Owen (Martin Kemp); subsequently becoming caught up in her parents' relationship; and a feud with Ben that involves him physically torturing her.

From her return in 2016, Louise's storylines included her blackmailing Abi Branning (Lorna Fitzgerald) over her fake pregnancy; helping her father cope with the death of his mother Peggy; forming a friendship with Bex Fowler (Jasmine Armfield); being the victim of bullying by Alexandra D'Costa (Sydney Craven) and Madison Drake (Seraphina Beh), in the early midst of which Louise briefly bullied Bex. After the bullying storyline ended with Louise suffering burns in her prom disaster, Lisa made a brief return to the series and appeared to have abducted Louise, although this was part of the feud between Lisa and Phil. In addition, Louise's storylines have also included being kidnapped by a gang that are in dodgy dealings with Ben and Phil, and relationships with fellow student Travis Law-Hughes (Alex James-Phelps); Steve's son Hunter Owen (Charlie Winter); local classmate Keegan Baker (Zack Morris) and Phil's employee Keanu Taylor (Danny Walters), which results in the birth of their daughter Peggy Taylor. Louise played a pivotal role at Christmas 2019 when she discovered that Keanu had been sleeping with her stepmother Sharon and is the father of her unborn child. After leaving Keanu for dead, Louise departed to Portugal with Lisa and Peggy to escape imprisonment.

== Development ==
=== Early development ===
The character is portrayed by Rachel Cox from the character's birth in 2001. As Phil is unaware that he is Louise's father, Benjamin said that Lisa finds it hard to keep Louise's parentage a secret. Feeling "overwhelmed" by Louise's birth and needing to discuss her "dilemma", Lisa confides in Phil's girlfriend, Sharon Watts (Letitia Dean). Benjamin added that Lisa chooses to reveal the truth to Sharon "for a number of reasons" and "hopes that Sharon will tell her she's doing the right thing" as well there being a "part of her that wants Phil to find out so she can stop living a lie." Regarding the December 2001 story line where Louise stops breathing while under Sharon's care, Dean explained that Sharon feels "much more responsible" as she is responsible for Louise's welfare and "was meant to be doing the babysitting, not Phil." Lisa is "angry, upset and really worried" and Dean said that Sharon is "very worried about Louise". Dean believed that if Phil discovered Louise was his daughter, Sharon and Phil's relationship would end. Louise's illness was a central storyline at Christmas 2001. Benjamin said the storyline would have "huge repercussions" and explained that it begins with "hope" but "goes horribly wrong in true Lisa style".

Following Benjamin's axing in 2002, Louise departed on-screen in October 2002. To tie with storylines, Louise was returned the following month when Phil gains custody of her. It was announced in June 2003 that Benjamin would return to the series and she explained, "I didn't think Lisa would give up baby Lou without one last fight." Lisa returned in September 2003 for two months and left on 28 November 2003 with Louise, marking the final appearance of Cox in the role.

"Her arrival is going to be massive. It will send shockwaves around the square."

— A show insider on Louise's reintroduction (2010)

Following a storyline in 2007 when Phil suggests finding Louise, she was reintroduced for one episode on 4 January 2008. The role of Louise was recast to Danni Bennatar. On 9 March 2010, it was announced that a "secret Mitchell" would arrive in the series looking for a "missing parent". The possible parents were Phil, Billy Mitchell (Perry Fenwick) and Ronnie Mitchell (Samantha Janus). The character arrives at "the local Tube station with just a small rucksack" where she first interacts with Ronnie. Despite initially being credited as "Little Girl", the character was revealed as Louise, who was now played by Brittany Papple. Benjamin explained that Louise was "old enough to make her own decisions and say, 'I want to live with my dad now'. So [Lisa] had to let her go."

The storyline where Louise is abused by her older half-brother, Ben Mitchell (Charlie Jones), by repeatedly burning her hand with a hot spoon, is a reflection of how Ben had been abused in the same way by Phil's former fiancée Stella Crawford (Sophie Thompson). Ben decides that Louise would "learn a lesson the same way he did". When Phil discovers that Ben is responsible, he "starts to worry that Ben is mimicking" Stella's behaviour. The storyline ends when Phil discovers that Ben is abusing Louise. In 2016, Keeper explained that "there's an element to [Louise] that's scared of Ben" and described Ben's behaviour as "horrible", referring to this earlier storyline.

Papple was axed from the series in 2010 to serve as a catalyst for a storyline which sees Phil become addicted to drugs. Benjamin reprised her role for one episode to aid Louise's departure. A show spokesperson explained that Lisa "won't be happy about him looking after his daughter." They teased that "this storyline is going to be an explosive episode in the Mitchells' history." Louise departed in the episode broadcast on 5 August 2010.

=== Reintroduction (2016) ===
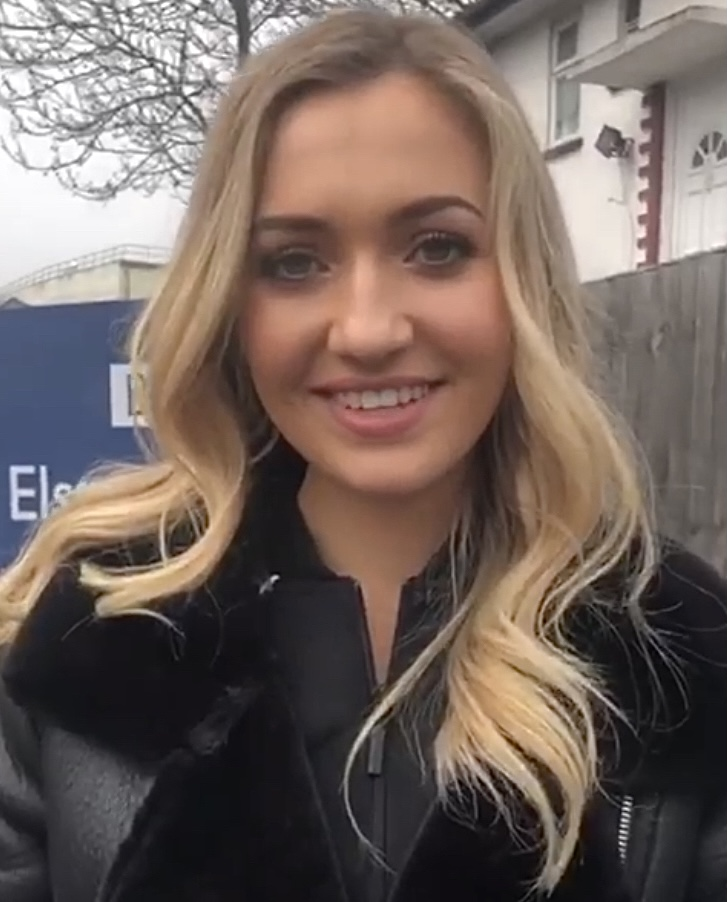
Tilly Keeper was cast as Louise.

On 16 December 2015, it was announced that Louise would be returning to the serial in early 2016. The role was recast, with 18-year-old television newcomer Tilly Keeper cast in the role. At the time of her casting, Keeper said, "I am so thrilled to be joining the cast of EastEnders, especially to be joining the Mitchell clan! It's a dream come true and I can't wait to get stuck into the role and see what lies in store for Louise." Keeper's EastEnders audition was her first audition since she left school. She believed she was auditioning for a character named Grace, and two days before she started filming, Keeper was told that she would play Louise and her first scene would be with McFadden. Keeper said that she felt like she had "hit the jackpot" when she received the role, and said she felt "smug" to be playing Louise, though wished she had been told sooner. Keeper added she is in "awe" of McFadden and described it as "incredible" to act with him. In her first scene, Keeper was required to "give it her all" as McFadden was acting drunk and had to be a "stand-offish and moody [...] horrible teenage girl" during the "emotional" scenes. Keeper stated she also "adores" working with Reid and Jamie Borthwick, who play her half-brother Ben and brother figure Jay and hopes for further scenes with Linda Henry as she likes their "funny" pairing and "nice relationship".

"I think it's an attention thing. She grew up being shared between her parents and not knowing if Phil ever wanted her. And so by acting up and lashing out at people, that's her way of saying that she needs help or she just needs a hug. She hasn't been hugged yet."

— Keeper on Louise's reasons for misbehaving (2016)

The character was reintroduced, having estranged from Lisa and decided to become "a true Mitchell". Upon her reintroduction, Louise was billed as "feisty and fearless" as well as a "treacherous teen." Keeper said that Louise is mischievous, but does not want to be seen as a child and would target "anyone who doesn't fall for her little bright-eyed, puppy dog face". Louise first appears in 2016 when Phil visits her at school to give her some money. A show insider explained that Louise is "shocked" when she sees Phil as he is "in a really bad way" and she is unsure what to do."

In April 2016, Louise moves to the show's fictional setting of Albert Square; Keeper explained that Louise wants to stay in Albert Square to gain attention that she was not getting from Lisa and to help Phil recover from his alcoholism because she "wants him to love her" instead of alcohol. Keeper said that Louise and Lisa's relationship will be explained, reiterating that Louise is "just looking for a bit of love". Keeper believes that a return from Lisa would be "interesting" to see how the relationship has changed. Keeper said that Louise has "Phil wrapped around her little finger", despite being "jealous" of Ben and Phil's relationship." Despite being "tough and ballsy" as a Mitchell, as well as a "bit twisted", Louise is ultimately "still a little girl [...] still quite vulnerable." She later told Laura Heffernan of Inside Soap that Louise has "real daddy issues" and should Phil die, Louise would "go off the rails". She describes Louise's forgiveness of Phil abandoning her as "natural", despite the lack of contact, as the serious nature of Phil's illness caused by alcohol "definitely hit a nerve with her." Following Ben's abuse of Louise in 2010, she is scared of him, but is hesitant to display this. Keeper revealed that she and Reid try to include spoons in their scenes as a reference to the storyline. Keeper hopes that Louise and Ben can move on and forge a relationship. Speaking of the possibility that Louise would enter a romantic relationship, Keeper said, "I don't think anyone would be able to handle her! [...] She wants to cement her place as the It Girl of Walford before she selects her man."

Louise blackmails Abi Branning (Lorna Fitzgerald), Ben's girlfriend, after discovering she is faking her pregnancy. Louise tries to separate Abi and Ben, which annoys Abi. Keeper defended Louise's actions, saying she is "bored" and that blackmailing Abi is something to do. Barbara Windsor reprised her role as Louise's grandmother, Peggy Mitchell, for her final stint in May 2016, on which Keeper said that she was, "so excited to play Peggy's granddaughter". She explained that Louise "adores and idolises Peggy", which resembles the actress' relationship with Windsor. Keeper has reflected on the storyline, branding it "an utter privilege" and "a real honour", adding that she had hoped to film with Windsor.

In January 2017, Keeper described Louise's development as "quite organic" and explained that viewers would lose interest in the character if she was "just a constant bitch all of the time" so she has created a multi-layered character. She reflected on her first year, noting that the layers of the character have "come to life" across the year. Keeper expressed an interest in filming scenes with Linda Henry, who plays Shirley Carter, describing Louise and Shirley's relationship as "really cool" and noting they are "quite pally" because Shirley was a mother figure in Louise's 2010 stint. She also hoped for more scenes with Reid and Borthwick as the "dynamics" between them and Louise are "always good and often hilarious". Keeper later said that she enjoyed Louise's relationship with Jay and Ben, describing Louise and Jay as "pally" and noting that despite their close relationship, there is "a bit of animosity" in Louise and Ben's relationship.

=== Friendships and relationships ===
Louise formed a friendship with Bex Fowler (Jasmine Armfield), which Keeper labelled "really nice". Shakil Kazemi (Shaheen Jafargholi) was introduced in May 2016 and Keeper teased a potential love triangle between Louise, Shakil and Bex, which would make Louise show her "scheming" and "manipulative" side as Louise gets what she wants. Further classmates of Louise were introduced including Keegan Baker (Zack Morris) who clashed with Louise immediately.

Outhwaite's return to the serial as Mel was announced in October 2017, and the character and casting of Mel's son Hunter Owen (Charlie Winter) was announced in December 2017. Mel returns during a heist storyline, searching for the missing money and she "drags" Louise into her "scheming". Prior to his debut, the Metro reported that Hunter could provide some happiness for Louise, with the pair knowing each other through Lisa and Mel's friendship. Louise and Hunter are already "firm friends", but their relationship could develop as Hunter may "be the one to change Louise's view of romance and make her smile again." Louise and Hunter could "embark" on a romance when they are set up by Tiffany Butcher (Maisie Smith), who "plays matchmaker in her own unique way."

Laura Morgan from Digital Spy gave reasons for Louise to have a romance with Keegan and Hunter. Despite Keegan initially being a "bad boy", he is "smitten" with Louise, who is seemingly "prepared to forget about the past", although Phil would not really approve of a relationship. With Hunter, although a "definite no" was given for a possible relationship with Louise, if a relationship developed, it could spark a love triangle with Keegan and Hunter competing for her "affections." Out of the two, Morgan opined that Hunter is "much more of an obvious match" due to their existing friendship.

=== Revenge porn and bullying ===
Shakil and Bex exchanged naked images as a compromise instead of having sex in December 2016. The storyline progressed into a revenge porn plot, with Louise, Alexandra D'Costa (Sydney Craven) and Madison Drake (Seraphina Beh) as the catalysts. Louise is involved in the bullying of Bex with Alexandra and Madison, but it evolves into Louise becoming a victim. Part of the bullying of Louise by Madison and Alexandra includes them turning her against her crush, Travis Law-Hughes (Alex James-Phelps). Madison and Alexandra try to prevent Louise's happiness with Travis by planting doubts of his intentions as Louise begins to enjoy Travis' presence and hope for a relationship. Keeper "felt extra pressure" when it came to acting out scenes where Louise's drinks are spiked as Louise is the daughter of "iconic drunk" Phil.

Louise suffers "even more trauma" over the chance of catching chlamydia from Keegan that would result in ramifications if either true or false. Despite Louise's "relief" at a negative pregnancy test, the rumours spiral "even more out of control and there are set to be some big consequences as Louise is left crushed by the turn of events" and Louise "fears" she has been sexually assaulted. Keeper and Armfield admitted that "they've been left vexed by Madison and Alexandra's manipulation" of Louise as do the writers and directors, saying it is "frustrating", however Keeper hopes Louise "sees sense" as "she's a clever girl." Keeper said that unlike other bullying storylines, where it is rare to see "someone on the sidelines and giving them a voice and seeing their POV through the camera and showing how they are feeling about it. There is the bullied, and the bullies and those who stand by." Keeper says Louise is "in a really vulnerable place" as she has "lost a lot of family members", that causes Louise to feel insecure and the need for "verification" and to "be told all the time that she's welcome, she is wanted and she is great, which is why she got with the bullies in the first place because they are the popular girls."

Louise is central in the drama around the teens prom night. Initially, "Louise is on cloud nine having been invited to the prom by her on-off boyfriend Travis" and after finding a "stunning" dress, "she is convinced she is about to have the night of her dreams." Madison and Alexandra "have other ideas" after Louise upset them by tackling "them about their behaviour". Louise hopes that "it's done and dusted" with Madison and Alexandra, but "it appears she has underestimated them." Keeper said that Louise was being "sassy" by standing up to Madison and Alexandra, which she "loved", however, Louise "overestimates her power" due to being a Mitchell and having Phil "the hardest man in east London as her dad, so she assumes nothing can go wrong." An "explosive cliffhanger" showing the school being evacuated "as a devastating fire threatened to break out, putting lives in danger", caused by Madison and Alexandra, to settle "scores with their victims."

Louise becomes "reluctant and self conscious" when she is left with scarring. At Halloween, her scarring also makes her feel "uncomfortable" when Bex tries to persuade and convince Louise to celebrate halloweenm though a prank pulled by Keegan "leaves her feeling worse." Out of obligation, Louise and Bex are forced to include Keegan's half-sister, Bernadette Taylor (Clair Norris) Halloween provides Louise and Bex the chance to open up to each other about their relationships and Louise is "startled when an over protective Travis then leaps to her defence and takes things too far." Louise realises "that she can't cope with Travis' smothering and defensive behaviour", prompting her decision to "end things with Travis." It transpires that Louise's issues run deeper when Bex "asks her what her scars look like" and tries to convince Louise "that she is beautiful no matter what" and "her scars needn't define her or rule her life."

Radio Times reporter, David Brown, explained that the storyline "tackles a topic that should be of massive concern to both tech-savvy teenagers and parents who fear they're being left behind when it comes to the way their offspring communicate" and noted that "the fallout of these rash actions" could lead to legal consequences for Louise, Bex and Shakil. He added that the show "is in a powerful position in that it can provide moral guidance to its younger viewers" and "has the potential to articulate the fears and worries of viewers who might not be able to express such concerns by themselves". Keeper said that the storyline and EastEnders are "good at highlighting social problems that parents might feel too awkward to address. So, the teenage characters are able to bring to light problems that an older generation might not even be aware of. It gives issues like sexting and losing your virginity a platform in a fictional setting." Keeper says the bullying storyline "has touched audiences" and believes "it's really important that EastEnders are showing the friend on the sidelines watching it."

=== Lisa Fowler's return ===
Benjamin reprised her role of Lisa for the aftermath of the prom and is "to be met with shock" from the Mitchells, especially Phil, who will question Lisa over her absence in Louise's life. Benjamin praised Keeper and her professionalism as well as stating they developed a "really lovely connection." Keeper suspected Benjamin would return, but received confirmation on getting the scripts and was "really excited" about meeting Benjamin as the previous actresses who portrayed Louise all worked with her, which "was something I [Keeper] really wanted to do". She described meeting Benjamin as "lovely", knowing from other cast members that she was "brilliant."

Benjamin explained that Sonia contacting Lisa brings her back as Sonia "feels Louise needs her [Lisa] to be there"; Louise asks for Lisa in "a state of upset" where "she's a bit delirious." Despite not receiving "a great reception", Lisa is given a choice on whether she wants to be involved with Louise, but holds the belief she is a "bad" mother in spite of not being informed and thinks it was best for Louise to stay away. Benjamin added that Lisa knows she will have a "hard time" with Louise to justify her absence due to her feeling "guilt", but ultimately has "unconditional love" for Louise and hope Louise needs and wants Lisa. Benjamin says Lisa regards Phil as the person who "triggers" everything bad for her and the cause of her problems, resulting in her wariness due to her knowledge of what Phil is "capable of doing." Although Lisa and Phil will never "be the best of friends or see eye-to-eye", Benjamin says their characters should put Louise first and be adults for her. Lisa sees Sharon as "the right woman for Phil" and regards her as "lovely", so she needs Sharon as an "ally" in order to help her relationship with Louise, but knows Sharon is "no fool", who "will stand her ground."

=== Departure (2020) ===
On 3 December 2019, it was announced that Louise would be leaving EastEnders as part of a "dramatic" story. The news was announced following the news of Danny Walters's departure from the soap, who portrays Louise's partner Keanu Taylor. Keeper expressed her gratitude for the role of Louise and the opportunity to work on the show, something which she would miss. Jon Sen, the show's executive producer, praised Keeper – the "incredible asset" to the cast – for her work and commented, "Her portrayal of Louise Mitchell over the past years has been a joy to watch."

== Storylines ==
=== 2001–2010 ===
Lisa Shaw (Lucy Benjamin) has a difficult relationship with Phil Mitchell (Steve McFadden) and does not want him to know that he is the father of her baby so she marries Mark Fowler (Todd Carty). When Lisa goes into labour, Phil is the only person that can help and Lisa reveals to Sharon Watts (Letitia Dean) that Phil is the father. Mark is named as Louise's father on her birth certificate. When Louise is kidnapped by Steve Owen (Martin Kemp), Phil chases him in a car chase. Steve crashes his car and passes Louise to Phil before the car explodes, killing Steve. While Sharon is babysitting her, Louise stops breathing, although Sharon does not realise as Phil has switched the baby monitor off. At the hospital, it emerges that Louise has an infection and is rushed to intensive care, prompting Lisa to decide to tell Phil that he is Louise's father. Before she has the opportunity, Sharon tells Phil the truth; he persuades Lisa to reconcile with him, but it becomes apparent that Phil and his mother, Peggy Mitchell (Barbara Windsor), want custody of Louise. Phil and Peggy exclude Lisa from Louise's care and hire a nanny. On the day that Peggy plans to celebrate changing Louise's surname from Fowler to Mitchell, Lisa and Louise leave for Portugal, joining her best friend and Steve's former wife, Mel Owen (Tamzin Outhwaite). Phil discovers a postcard with Mel's address and goes to Portugal, returning with Louise and stating that Lisa will not return. He confides in Kate Morton (Jill Halfpenny) that he bullied Lisa to give him custody of Louise and warned her to stay away from Louise. Lisa returns to claim custody of Louise, which she obtains after Phil is arrested, and they subsequently leave Walford.

In 2007, Phil suggests to his son, Ben Mitchell (Charlie Jones), that they find Louise. They decide against it, but later in the year, Jack Branning (Scott Maslen) informs Phil that he knows where Louise is and they locate her in January 2008. When Phil tells Louise that he is her father, she calls another man her father. In 2010, Louise returns when she is dropped outside the tube station. Phil's cousin, Ronnie Mitchell (Samantha Womack), approaches her and Louise tells Ronnie she is looking for her father and shows Ronnie a photo. Louise explains that Lisa went on holiday but never returned. When Ronnie spots Phil arguing, she tells Louise that she could not find her father and calls Social Services, who take her into their care. Louise returns again and spends the weekend with Phil; they keep the visit a secret. Phil eventually informs Social Services of Louise's whereabouts, but decides to fight for custody. A social worker assesses that Phil's home is unsafe for Louise so Phil's girlfriend, Shirley Carter (Linda Henry), decides that Phil, Louise and Ben can live with her. Ben dislikes Louise's arrival and she annoys him when she writes entries in his diary referring to him as being gay, before reading them to her friends. Phil forces Louise to apologise but she does not; when Phil is out of the house, Ben burns Louise's hand with a hot spoon.

Louise spots Ben with stolen alcohol and tries to get him in trouble with Phil. Ben warns Louise that Phil will not believe her and if she does tell him, he will make her suffer. Ben later locks Louise in a shed all day and makes Phil believe that she has run away. Ben claims to find Louise and takes her home, blaming Jordan Johnson (Michael-Joel David Stuart) for locking her up. Ben tells Louise that she is a good girl and that he will not lock her in the shed again. Phil notices burns on Louise's arm and she blames Ben, so Phil questions him, but he denies it. Phil asks Heather Trott (Cheryl Fergison) to look after Louise and Ben; when Ben sends Heather to the shop, Phil panics and rushes home to find Louise's doll in pieces and Ben about to burn her. Ben claims to be playing a game, but Phil punches him. Phil learns that Lisa has applied to see Louise and asks his solicitor to find a legal way to stop Lisa seeing Louise. Louise asks Peggy about Lisa so Peggy reveals that Lisa has returned from holiday. She demands to see Lisa and runs away. When Phil finds Louise, she tells him that she wants to see Lisa, angering Phil. After Phil hits Peggy, which Louise witnesses, Peggy decides to take Louise out for the day, despite Phil's orders for Louise not to leave the house. Louise asks to see Lisa so Peggy takes her to see her. Peggy struggles to assure Lisa that Phil will not harm Louise and leaves her with Lisa on the promise that Phil can visit regularly. Peggy returns home and tells Phil that Louise is in Lisa's custody, but he drives to Lisa's house to find the house empty.

=== 2016–2020 ===
Phil tracks down a 14-year-old Louise at her school and gives her a bag of cash, but she rejects him until he collapses in pain. Louise arrives in Walford to tell her stepmother Sharon, that Phil is in hospital. Two months later, Louise goes to Phil's with her belongings, but Ben (now played by Harry Reid) answers the door and sends her away. As a drunken Phil demolishes the car lot, the residents of Albert Square realise someone is trapped inside and Louise is discovered under the rubble; Phil breaks down, fearing he has killed her. Louise is hospitalised with broken ribs and concussion. Phil then makes amends with Louise. Ben's girlfriend Abi Branning (Lorna Fitzgerald) discovers that Louise has used Phil's credit card; she and Babe Smith (Annette Badland) confront Louise and force her to return everything she has bought. Louise then discovers a note from Babe revealing that Abi has lied about being pregnant. After Ben continues to upset Louise, Louise blackmails Abi, warning her to leave Walford with Ben or she tell Ben the truth. Abi refuses after realising that Ben trusts her more than he trusts Louise. However, Abi offers Louise cash to keep her quiet, but inadvertently reveals the truth when she finds Ben and Louise arguing about Phil's credit card. When Jay Brown (Jamie Borthwick) stops Phil drinking, Louise thanks him and tries to kiss him but he stops her. Jay tells his girlfriend, Linzi Bragg (Amy-Leigh Hickman), that Louise tried to kiss him, so she confronts Louise, telling her to stay away from Jay.

After discovering that Linzi is an underage schoolgirl, Jay ends the relationship and asks Louise not to tell anyone the truth. Louise attempts to shoplift wine so Denise Fox (Diane Parish) calls the police. Louise posts dog faeces in a bag through Denise's letter box so she confronts Louise and Phil. When Jay and Linzi's relationship is revealed, Louise defends Jay so Phil asks if she is doing so because he has touched her. Jay denies this but admits that Louise kissed him but he stopped it; Phil is angry. Jay is arrested and Louise is questioned by the police. Louise's best friend, Bex Fowler (Jasmine Armfield), develops a crush on Shakil Kazemi (Shaheen Jafargholi) and Louise makes Bex jealous by flirting with him. Louise tries to come between Bex and Shakil, but they start a relationship regardless. Louise suspects Phil, an alcoholic, is drunk when his speech is slurred and she lies to Sharon but fails to find any traces of alcohol in the house. However, Phil is not drunk and it emerges that he has hepatic encephalopathy. Louise joins a drama club where she takes a liking to Travis Law-Hughes (Alex James-Phelps). Travis asks Louise on a date but fails to turn up. Keegan Baker (Zack Morris) tells Louise that she was actually messaging him, not Travis, and he teases her with things she said in the messages.

After becoming trapped on the top of the bus after a crash, Shakil helps Louise to overcome her fears, telling Bex that he saved her life. After she is teased over a video of her in the crash, Louise's friends, Alexandra D'Costa (Sydney Craven) and Madison Drake (Seraphina Beh), convince her that Shakil is to blame and encourage her to get revenge. Louise sends a naked photo of Shakil to them from Bex's phone, distressing Bex. Louise tells Bex not to tell Shakil who sent his photo and Louise chooses to spend time with Madison and Alexandra instead of Bex. Madison and Alexandra start to bully Bex and Louise is not supportive. When the photo of Shakil is discovered and the police are involved, Bex takes the blame for its distribution. Bex warns Louise that she will tell the police the truth so Louise confesses that Madison and Alexandra were responsible; Bex takes the blame for the incident. Madison and Alexandra attack Bex while Louise is too scared to help Bex. Bex admits to teachers Mrs Robyn Lund (Polly Highton) and Mr Gethin Pryce (Cerith Flinn) that Louise, Madison and Alexandra were responsible for her attack and sending the photo; Madison and Alexandra deny knowledge and urge Louise to do the same. After Louise reluctantly does so, Bex calls her out on her cowardice and ends their friendship. Madison and Alexandra continue to bully Bex, despite Louise's attempts at stopping them. Sonia confronts Louise and Sharon over the bullying and Sharon warns Louise that unlike Bex, Madison and Alexandra are not true friends. After discovering that Bex asked Sonia not to mention Louise's name to the school, Louise realises that she needs to apologise to Bex, but she rejects this.

Madison and Alexandra decide to get revenge on Louise; when Louise confides in Madison and Alexandra about Phil's alcoholism, they use it against her. They suggest a night at Louise's house for the three of them, but they hide vodka and invite several people. Madison and Alexandra spike Louise's drink, making her drunk. Louise coughs up blood and collapses so Bex helps her. Louise is hospitalised with paralysis and Sharon tells Louise that Bex helped her; Louise apologises to Bex, which Bex rejects. Madison and Alexandra deny knowing how Louise got drunk and claim that Travis spiked her drink. Louise starts dating Travis but Madison and Alexandra tell her that he is only interested in sex, and when Travis kisses her, she runs away. Keegan claims that he and Louise had sex at the party and reveals that he knows about Louise's birthmark, which Madison and Alexandra support. Bex persuades Louise to do a pregnancy test, which is negative. Madison and Alexandra claim that Keegan has chlamydia so Bex accompanies Louise to be tested for sexually transmitted diseases. Louise is upset to discover that Keegan is moving to Albert Square and is heartbroken when Travis ends their relationship, believing the rumours about her and Keegan. Louise confides in Sharon that she thinks that Keegan raped her and the police take a statement from Louise. She has to undergo a physical examination and Keegan is arrested on suspicion of rape, despite revealing that he lied. The investigation is dropped and Sharon confronts Keegan; he explains that Dennis told him about Louise's birthmark and apologises. Louise and Travis reunite, Madison and Alexandra's bullying of Bex is publicly exposed and Bex and Lousie make amends.

At prom, Travis arranges a candlelit area for him and Louise. Madison and Alexandra arrive and Louise berates them; Alexandra pushes Louise onto the lit candles, leaving her with third degree skin burns that require skin grafts. Louise is unhappy when Lisa arrives at the hospital and after arguing over feeling abandoned and blamed, Louise admits that she is scared. Louise is distressed when Travis visits her in hospital. Lisa lies to Louise that she has been discharged and takes Louise during a crucial stage in her recovery. Louise struggles without her medication but Lisa prevents her from using the phone. Louise realises that Lisa is mentally unstable, but chooses to stay and comfort Lisa when she becomes distressed. Phil saves Louise and she returns to hospital. Louise is discharged and confides in Phil about feeling guilty over Lisa. Louise is permanently scarred by the fire and Travis' protectiveness overwhelms Louise so she ends their relationship. Louise asks Bex for her opinion on her scars; Bex convinces Louise to look at them. Louise is thrilled when Mel returns to Walford and reunites with Mel and Steve Owen’s son, Hunter Owen (Charlie Winter). Tiffany Butcher (Maisie Smith) tries to matchmake Louise and Hunter, and despite insisting that he is not interested in Louise, Hunter kisses her. Hunter suggests that they have sex and they discuss it and her scars; Hunter reassures Louise that he will wait. Hunter persuades Phil to link the CCTV of his club, E20, to his phone on the opening night. Prior to the opening, Louise and Hunter have sex at the club with Hunter winking at the CCTV camera beforehand. Phil is enraged when he watches the CCTV.

After Shakil dies from being stabbed, the teenagers spend time at E20 to celebrate his life, where money is stolen from the safe. In a game of 'Spin The Bottle' Keegan and Tiffany kiss which makes Louise jealous, showing she has feelings for him. However, she further comforts Keegan after Shakil's death. Afterwards, Louise and her friends received an anonymous text reading "I know what you did last night". When it emerges that Hunter sent the texts, Louise ends their relationship and tells Mel. Louise develops a crush on Keanu Taylor (Danny Walters), but he does not like her back and unbeknownst to the Mitchells, is having an affair with Louise's stepmother, Sharon. Louise decides to move on and begins a relationship with Keanu's half-brother, Keegan, which is only ever about sex and doesn't go anywhere. Louise turns to Ray Kelly (Sean Mahon) for comfort and tries to kiss him but he rejects her. Hunter warns Louise that Ray is dangerous and she eventually discovers his true colours. Louise continues her on/off fling with Keanu and Phil pays Keanu to look after Louise when he becomes scared that his Spanish rivals will kidnap her. Louise grows close to one of them, Midge (Tom Colley) and whilst walking on George Street, Midge and his men kidnap Louise. She's driven to a shipping container where they threaten her and tie her hands behind her back and gag her with a cloth. They plan to sell her off into sex trade in Odessa, and Midge threatens to throw acid in her face if she doesn't sit down and allow her ankles to be bound. She's left crying in the container, and only able to barely move. Keanu eventually finds Louise who makes noise by moaning through her gag and finds her in tears and begs him to untie her.He unties her, but Midge knocks him out and locks both of them inside, leaving Louise crying out. Once Keanu comes round he unties Louise and she helps him through a panic attack and during a heart-to-heart, Louise learns that a relationship with Keanu is not possible and they manage to escape and find Phil and Ben (now played by Max Bowden). Later that day, despite what Keanu said earlier; he begins to have real feelings towards her and wants them to begin a relationship thus they sleep together.

Louise and Keanu briefly enjoy their relationship together until Louise finds out that she is pregnant. Louise is scared that Keanu will leave her, but they agree to raise the baby together. However, Louise overhears Keanu and Phil talking about Phil paying Keanu to date Louise for protection, which causes Louise to break up with him. Louise later lies and tells Keanu that the pregnancy was a false alarm, but secretly tells Sharon that she wants an abortion. Louise talks to her distant cousin Lola Pearce (Danielle Harold) about motherhood, which causes Louise to reconsider the abortion and she decides to keep the baby. Keanu finds out about Louise's choice for an abortion, which causes him to sleep with Sharon again. She reconciles with Keanu and they become engaged. After Stacey Fowler (Lacey Turner) attacks Phil trying to protect Martin Fowler (James Bye), Keanu is believed to be the culprit, so Louise runs away with him to stay with Lisa. Louise returns to Albert Square with Keanu and Lisa, but while she is catching up with Bex in The Queen Vic, a vengeful Hunter takes the pub full of wedding guests hostage, wounding Ben in a scuffle. Hunter then grabs a pregnant Louise, Bex offering he take her instead, but Louise goes outside with Hunter anyway, who threatens to kill her if police marksmen do not disarm. Keanu runs towards them to rescue Louise, but Hunter shoots him, dropping Louise to the floor. A police marksman then shoots Hunter, and his body falls on Louise. When Louise turns 18, Mel buys Louise a car. However, when she is driving to tell Phil the truth regarding Sharon and Keanu's affair, Mel gets into a car crash, and dies after being hit by a lorry. Lisa suspects that Sharon killed Mel in an attempt to keep the affair a secret, leading Louise to worry about Lisa's mental health. Fearing for the safety of herself and the unborn baby, she moves back in with Sharon and Phil.

Louise gives birth to her daughter, Peggy Taylor. Phil and Ben quiz Louise, asking if there were any men around the house the previous summer and Ben says that they think Sharon was having an affair. She works out who it was but tells the pair that she has no idea. She asks Keanu if he is the father of Sharon's baby, which he confirms. She lashes out, but when Keanu suggests running away, she agrees. However, she sets him up, and lets Martin take Keanu away to be murdered on Ben and Phil's behalf. Louise gives back the engagement ring to Karen Taylor (Lorraine Stanley) which belonged to her mother. Louise feels guilt over sending Keanu to be murdered, causing her to lose sleep and become tired. When Peggy cries relentlessly, Louise goes to smother her with a pillow, but before she can, Lisa stops her. Louise then confesses to her that she was part of Keanu being killed. The stress this causes Louise eventually results in her and Lisa deciding to leave the Square in order to live at the villa Mel had purchased in Portugal.

== Reception ==
Keeper was longlisted for Best Soap Newcomer at the 2016 TV Choice Awards and for Best Newcomer at the 2016 Inside Soap Awards, but did not make the shortlist for either one. She was nominated in the 2016 TV Times Awards for Most Popular Newcomer but lost out to Emmerdale's Isobel Steele, who plays Liv Flaherty. She was also shortlisted for Best Newcomer at the 2017 National Television Awards, but lost out to Faye Brookes, who portrays Kate Connor in Coronation Street.

Daniel Kilkelly (Digital Spy) described Louise's feud with Ben as "disturbing" and questioned "who can forget a very troubled Ben abusing his younger sibling"? A reporter writing for the Inside Soap Yearbook 2017 (a review of the year 2016 in British soap) described Louise as "amazing" and part of "the new Mitchell dynasty", which they "loved". They also included Louise and Denise's short feud in their "A to Z" list of 2016, noting that "vengeful Louise popped a poo in a bag through the letterbox of Walford's Denise", which is something "you don't get to experience every day!" Duncan Lindsay from the Metro said that through the young characters, EastEnders "is nailing the representation of the various young characters you find in school environments" and that Louise is "desperate for acceptance and popularity." He also said that Keeper had "already more than proved her worth [...] in genuine performances as Phil's health suffered."
