= Jill Marsden (EastEnders) =

UK soap opera character, created 2001

- EastEnders character
- Portrayed by: Sophie Stanton
- Duration: 2001–2003, 2009–2010, 2012, 2015
- First appearance: Episode 2078; 5 March 2001
- Last appearance: Episode 5166; 2 November 2015
- Introduced by: John Yorke (2001); Louise Berridge (2002); Diederick Santer (2009); Bryan Kirkwood (2012); Dominic Treadwell-Collins (2015)
- Spin-off appearances: Marsden's Video Diaries (2009–2010)
In-universe information
- Occupation: Detective Chief Inspector

DCI Jill Marsden is a fictional character in the BBC soap opera EastEnders, played by Sophie Stanton. She made her first appearance on 5 March 2001 investigating the shooting of Phil Mitchell (Steve McFadden), which was part of the whodunit storyline "Who Shot Phil?". Marsden returned in 2002, 2003 and 2009 (for another whodunit storyline, "Who Killed Archie?"). She returned on 5 January 2012 for her third whodunit storyline, "Who's Stalking Phil?", departing four months later on 10 May 2012. Marsden returned for two episodes on 17 August 2012 to conclude the latter storyline. On 16 July 2015, she returned for part of the "Who Killed Lucy Beale?" whodunit storyline.

When she was brought back in 2009, Marsden's feelings were explored in a segment of the BBC EastEnders homepage entitled "Marsden's Video Diaries", documenting the character's thoughts about the storyline in which she was involved. Marsden's relationship with Phil has been explored since her first appearance, with the BBC describing their relationship as a "romance in negative...her ultimate dream is that some day she'll get [Phil] behind bars" and the Daily Mirror's Tony Stewart calling her Phil's "arch enemy".

The character has been criticised by police detectives who felt that Marsden's habit of discussing investigation details with suspects (as her colleagues accepted bribes) did not properly represent their profession. In response, the BBC said it had sought advice from a police consultant for storylines involving Marsden.

== Development ==
=== Characterisation ===
Nicknamed the "female sleuth" by the Daily Record, Marsden's profile on the EastEnders website describes her as "fearless, [a] no-nonsense copper and the scourge of Walford’s criminal fraternity." The East Anglian Daily Times described Marsden as "tough", Ian Hyland from The Mirror called her "scary" and Nancy Banks-Smith from The Guardian characterised her as "strict". Naomi Mcelroy described Marsden as a "curly-haired copper", but said as a detective she was "rubbish"; Polly Hudson from The Daily Mirror similarly opined, saying she was "useless" (as did Mcelroy), and stated that Marsden was "making a right pig's ear" of investigating Archie's (Lamb) murder. The Daily Mirror's Tony Stewart characterised her as "vindictive".

=== Introduction, 2002 and 2003 returns ===
Marsden first appeared on 5 March 2001 in the "Who Shot Phil?" storyline. In the whodunit storyline the five main suspects were Dan Sullivan, Steve Owen, Lisa Shaw, Ian Beale and Mark Fowler. A source in the Daily Record said, "Sooner or later the truth will out. But until then there's going to be a lot of probing going on." She left on 27 March 2001 after unsuccessfully identifying the shooter (who turned out to be Lisa). In 2002 she appeared in January, April and from 14 November to 6 December. In November, when Marsden returns, the police suspect that Phil has murdered his ex-wife Lisa. The Daily Mirror said, "They are the words Phil Mitchell has heard many times before. 'You're nicked', baldy. Intrepid DCI Marsden may not be a Jane Tennison, but she's nabbed her prime suspect. "I've got some good news for you, Phil," she says, after arresting him on suspicion of murder. "The police in Portugal found your jacket. Unfortunately for you, it's covered in blood. Mrs Fowler's blood..." In 2003, Marsden returned in March July, August, November and for a longer stint in December.

=== Who Killed Archie? and 2012 returns ===
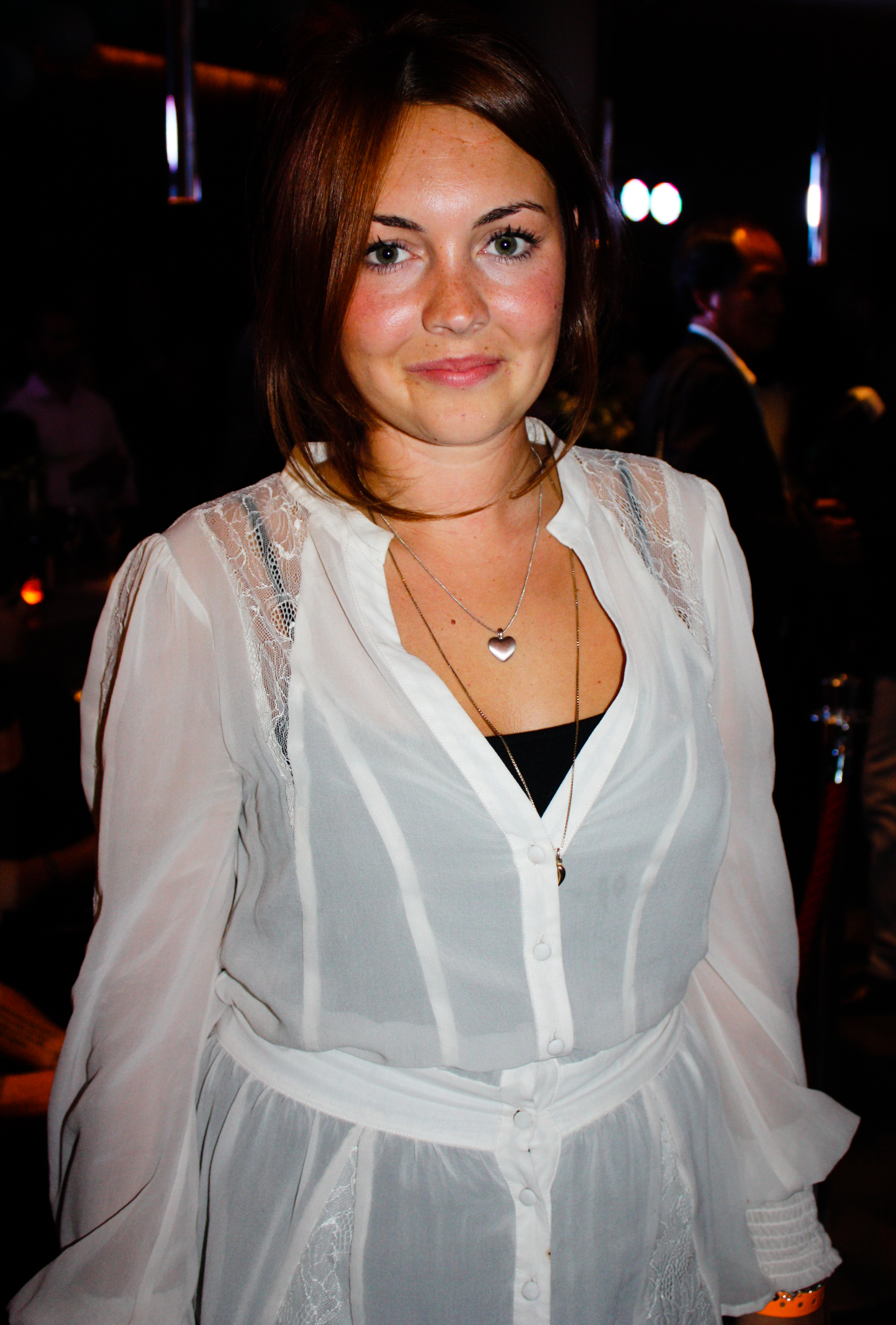
Stanton correctly guessed that Archie Mitchell's murderer was Stacey (Lacey Turner, pictured).

In November 2009, it was reported that Stanton would reprise her role as Jill. Digital Spy forum members had previously pointed out that her return was hinted at in a photo on the official EastEnders website and in a feature ("Script Peek") where Phil is quoted as saying, "I know exactly what makes her tick" before adding "I've wriggled off her hook so many times. She's already picturing me standing in the dock" in the 29 December episode. Marsden returned to investigate the murder of Archie Mitchell. A source told Digital Spy, "Marsden has a score to settle with Phil. She was never far behind Phil when he put a foot out of place all those years ago and she's back with a vengeance...With so many people in the frame for Archie's murder, Marsden has a difficult job on her hands if she wants to pin it on Phil." Of her return she said, "It came completely out of the blue, and knocked me for six."...I really thought Marsden was no more. It was a really great surprise because I'd just finished a year's run at the National Theatre, appearing in a new play called England People Very Nice – so it couldn't have come at a better time." She returned on 28 December 2009.

Although Stanton did not know who murdered Archie, she guessed that it could be Stacey Slater (which turned out to be correct). Speaking of this, she said that Sophie was one of the few to correctly guess it was Stacey. "I had an epiphany about a week before the live episode. It was a memory of the whole Who Shot Phil? storyline, and how there were eight different suspects, including some really hard blokes, and it turned out to be Lisa. I knew DCI Marsden wasn't going to get the culprit, because of a couple of scenes of the following episode we'd shot in December, and I thought that narratively, Stacey was the only person who the audience would forgive, and who could get away with it. That was my theory and it turned out to be right!" Naomi Mcelroy from The Sunday Mirror thought that Marsden could be Archie's killer. Marsden left on 22 February 2010, and returned on 5 January 2012. She returned after Phil is framed for Kevin Wicks' (Phil Daniels)'s death and that of a homeless man, who died accidentally in a car-lot fire (part of an insurance scam). According to Inside Soap the police would begin questioning Phil's former fiancée Stella Crawford's death, teasing Marsden's return: "The investigation is set to bring Phil face to face with his old nemesis, DCI Marsden – and this time she'll stop at nothing to put the bad boy permanently behind bars". Digital Spy reported that Marsden re-opens the investigation into Stella's death, "suspecting that all is not what it seems". Finally, Marsden returned for two single episodes on 17 August 2012.

=== Who Killed Lucy Beale? ===
In July 2015, it was revealed that Stanton would be reprising her role as Marsden for the continuation of the Who Killed Lucy Beale? storyline. Whilst viewers know Bobby Beale (Eliot Carrington) is the culprit, Marsden, Samantha Keeble (Alison Newman) and Cameron Bryant (Glen Wallace) will reportedly make an arrest for the murder, arresting an innocent suspect.

== Storylines ==
=== 2001–2003 ===
Jill Marsden first appears on Albert Square in March 2001, having been assigned as the chief police detective in charge of investigating the shooting of local hardman Phil Mitchell (Steve McFadden). She identifies the five main suspects: Phil's stepson Ian Beale (Adam Woodyatt), ex-business partner Dan Sullivan (Craig Fairbrass), sworn enemy Steve Owen (Martin Kemp), love rival Mark Fowler (Todd Carty), and former girlfriend Lisa Shaw (Lucy Benjamin). After Marsden interrogates each of the suspects behind Phil's shooting, it is eventually transpired in April 2001 that Lisa was the culprit. However, Phil gradually forgives Lisa and decides to frame Dan for the crime instead. He plants the gun, which Lisa took from Steve's office, in Dan's possession and enables for Marsden and her colleagues to arrest Dan for shooting Phil. A couple of months later, however, Dan is acquitted due to lack of evidence. Marsden later arrests local housewife Little Mo Slater (Kacey Ainsworth) for the attempted murder of her husband Trevor Morgan (Alex Ferns). Little Mo claims self-defence, since she has been a victim of domestic violence at the hands of Trevor. The trial ends, with Trevor's treatment of Little Mo revealed. In 2003, local resident Sonia Jackson (Natalie Cassidy) visits Marsden with evidence that Phil killed his ex-girlfriend Lisa. Marsden sets up a honey-trap for Phil in order to obtain a confession from him, with PC Kate Morton (Jill Halfpenny) and DI Dominic Price (Paul Brennen) aiding her in the case; however, this fails when Kate falls in love with Phil and Marsden fires her. Marsden arrests Phil, but with insufficient evidence and no confession he is released. It later emerges that Lisa is safe and well, and Phil is innocent. This forces Marsden to let Phil off the hook, but she later arrests him for armed robbery; Phil's arch-rivals Den Watts (Leslie Grantham) and his illegitimate son Dennis Rickman (Nigel Harman) have worked together to set him up for the crime in revenge for what he did to their beloved family member, Sharon (Letitia Dean).

=== 2009–2010 ===
Marsden reappears on Albert Square in 2009 when Phil's villainous uncle, Archie (Larry Lamb), is murdered on Christmas Day 2009. She arrives on the scene when several people claim that Archie's partner-in-crime, Janine Butcher (Charlie Brooks), had killed him - though but Marsden waits before questioning her, and decides to interrogate the Mitchells first. She makes a televised appeal for witnesses and later interviews Phil, but he is provided an alibi by his new girlfriend Shirley Carter (Linda Henry). A few days later, a red fingernail is found at the scene of the murder; Marsden visits the female locals, checking their hands. When Marsden notices Shirley's best-friend Heather Trott (Cheryl Fergison) is at a vulnerable state over the matter, she questions Heather about Christmas Day and Heather accidentally tells Marsden that Phil wasn't there. Marsden interviews Phil and later visits his home, asking to see the clothes he was wearing on Christmas Day. Shirley shows her a clean shirt; Marsden closes the laundrette, hoping anyone with blood-stained clothes will not be able to wash them. After a tip-off, Marsden arrests Phil's sister Sam (Danniella Westbrook) for the murder; Sam has accused her and Phil's mother, Peggy (Barbara Windsor), for killing Archie. Later on, Marsden confirms that she was there to talk to Peggy; she had been questioning Peggy and Sam at the police station. Peggy is released without charge; however, Sam is detained for jumping bail. Marsden visits Janine, who insists that people will say anything to get her in trouble. She asks Janine why she was out in the cold on Christmas Day, and asks if Janine knows where Archie's laptop as it had gone missing.

On 18 January, Marsden arrests Ian after Janine told her that Ian took advantage of her, stole Archie's laptop, which had a recording of them having sex on it, and dumped it in the canal. Ian refuses to talk, but when Marsden shows him CCTV footage of him dumping the laptop, and then shows him the recovered laptop, he admits visiting Archie on Christmas Day; claiming that Archie was threatening him and that he merely visited him to delete the recording. Ian denies murdering Archie, but Marsden is unconvinced and later charges him. A couple of days later, Janine tells Marsden she saw Ian leave the Queen Victoria on Christmas Day but the bust of Queen Victoria was on the bar after he left. Marsden places Janine at the scene, but she also denies murdering Archie. Marsden tells Ian that although the murder charge will be dropped, he will still be charged with burglary and theft of Archie's laptop. She and DC Wayne Hughes (Jamie Treacher) attend Archie's funeral, watching people's reactions in the hope of a new lead. Peggy returns to Archie's grave; when Marsden asks why, she explains that she didn't believe him when he said his cancer had returned.

The following week, Archie's daughter Ronnie (Samantha Womack) spots Marsden talking to her ex-boyfriend Jack Branning (Scott Maslen) about Archie's murder; Jack tells Ronnie that he was fishing for information. With no new leads, Marsden's boss threatens to take her off the case. She reviews the suspects and decides to question Jack, since he is asking more questions than he has answered. In the café, Marsden and Hughes discuss new information she has obtained - ensuring that she is overheard. Chinese whispers-style rumours circulate, ending with the certainty that Marsden would arrest Ronnie. Ronnie sees Marsden in the Square, and a struggle ensues. She knocks Marsden down, prompting her to arrest Ronnie - who is later charged with assaulting a police officer; Ronnie is subsequently released on bail. Marsden suspects Ronnie further, saying that she has now shown her true colours. Later, Marsden witnesses fellow policewoman DC Jasmine Field (Karen Ascoe) entering the pub with other officers to arrest a suspect; frightened, Ronnie leaves Walford. Marsden is suspicious when Jasmine arrests Jack's stepmother, Dot (June Brown), for assaulting her granddaughter Dotty (Molly Conlin).; earlier on, Dot slapped Dotty after she insulted her and wish that she had died at the hands of her father and Dot's criminal son - Nick (John Altman). Shortly after Dot is taken into custody, though later released without charge, Jack accuses Marsden for unnecessarily sending am uniformed officer to arrest Dot and unsettle the locals; he later realizes there was no new information.

Janine tells Marsden that Ronnie has fled, but Marsden finds her at the Queen Vic. Marsden remarks that a new forensic profile has been found, and DNA screening of white males will shortly begin. After Hughes accepts a bribe from Jack to make the DNA samples disappear, Marsden receives an anonymous tip-off. The police search Janine's flat, finding the engagement ring that went missing the night of Archie's murder, and Janine is arrested; she is later released for lack of evidence. The police are again called with a warrant to arrest Jack's nephew Bradley (Charlie Clements), after his ex-lover Becca Swanson (Simone James) told Marsden that Bradley had attacked Archie on Christmas Day. Marsden spots him when his phone rings; two officers chase Bradley to the roof, where he stumbles and falls to his death. The investigation ends, since the police believe that Bradley had killed Archie; however, his killer was actually Bradley's estranged wife Stacey Slater (Lacey Turner) - who later confesses the murder to her father-in-law Max (Jake Wood).

=== 2012 ===
In January 2012, Ian's one-time lover Denise Fox (Diane Parish) gives Marsden a letter that incriminates Phil in the death of a homeless man - who is reported to have died after Phil torched the car lot in an insurance scam in 1994; she adds that Phil also murdered his ex-fiance, Stella Crawford (Sophie Thompson), and Marsden thanks Denise for the information. Marsden arrives in Walford and begins trailing Phil. She asks Denise not to tell Phil that she is in town, wanting to ensure Phil's imprisonment. Marsden then targets Phil's son, Ben (Joshua Pascoe), interviewing him about Stella's death. Ben was abused by Stella and finds Marsden's questions distressing; however, she continues to press him. After a falling-out with Phil Ben changes his statement, telling Marsden that Phil told Stella to jump off a building or he would push her. Marsden then arrests Phil for murder, and Ben reveals he was stalking him. She informs Phil's partner, Shirley, that he has been charged with Stella's murder. Ben pleads with Marsden to keep his statement a secret from the Mitchells, but she tells him he must accept that his father will learn about Ben's involvement in his arrest eventually. After discovering Ben's lies about his father, Ian then passes this information on to Marsden and Ben is arrested. On the day Phil release, he helps Ben hide his involvement in Heather's murder; Marsden tells Phil at the police station she will contact him about Ben's accusations. The charges against Ben are dropped; Marsden visits Phil, taunting him that he will eventually slip up and further implies that Ben may ultimately bring him to justice

In August, Marsden reappears when Ben confesses Heather's murder. She does not believe his confession, thinking it is another lie to get attention from Phil. However, Ben is arrested and charged with the murder after Marsden helps fellow policeman DS Luke Crisp (Rufus Wright) convince Ben's best-friend, Jay Brown (Jamie Borthwick), to implicate him as Heather's killer.

=== 2015 ===
In July 2015, Phil learns that Marsden is aiding her colleague DI Samantha Keeble (Alison Newman) with investigating the murder of Ian's daughter Lucy (Hetti Bywater); her father and the Beale family were earlier informed that Marsden would be coordinating with the case. When Phil answers the door that Marsden is knocking outside his house, he is shocked and appalled when she wants to speak to Ben about Lucy's murder. Phil slams the door in her face and then attempts to delay Marsden so Ben can flee Walford, but Ben is eventually arrested.

== Other appearances ==
The BBC used viral promotion on the EastEnders homepage to further develop the storyline of Who Killed Archie?, with Marsden the main character in the nine videos. A new section ("Marsden's Video Diaries") was launched, encompassing events on the show from 25 December 2009 onwards in diary style from Marsden's point of view. Insight was provided on the character's thoughts and feelings on the events surrounding her each week, beginning with the introduction: "Christmas Day. I should be at home with my feet up eating a mince pie and watching the Doctor Who Christmas special. Instead, I’ve been called into work. Murder. A bloody one too. The victim, one Archibald Mitchell. Not the first time a Mitchell's ruined my night. Still, if this leads to Phil Mitchell all wrapped up in Walford nick by New Years day, might be the best present I’ve ever had." On the videos Marsden discussed evidence, suspects she had brought in and her relationship with Phil.

Day 8 of the Archie Mitchell investigation and still nothing solid. Problem with a place like Albert Square there all as thick as thieves. Murder happens right under their noses and nobody seems to know a thing about it. Funny that. This Archie Mitchell sounds like a right ray of sunshine, not a lot of friends. Finding someone who hasn’t got a motive to kill him is proving tricky. But I’ve got a feeling, with this little fingernail, we might just be getting a little bit closer."

— Episode 2 of Marsden's Video Diaries, 25 December 2009.

During the next three video diaries, Marsden talks about the suspects and the evidence against them. In episode three it is Ronnie, Peggy and Sam; in episode four she talks about Janine Butcher, and in episode five she discusses Ian's motives. Towards the end of the series (in episode seven), Marsden's boss threatens to fire her if she does not capture the culprit: "I’ve got to get someone. I’ve got to pin this on someone. Every address in the immediate area door-stopped. Five suspects questioned, one arrest. Nothing. They tell me nothing. Mitchell, the ex wife, the daughter, Beale, Butcher, [Jack] Branning, I’m getting closer, I just need time. Of course my boss is putting pressure on. Says I’m losing my touch, That he'll take the case of me. This is my case. Somebody's going down for it and it ain’t going to be me." In the penultimate episode, Marsden announces that the DNA results have come through; this is aired on EastEnders. The final episode of Marsden's Video Diaries aired on 19 February 2010, three days before Marsden's departure in 2010. In this episode ("Case Closed"), the Lionel Richie song "Hello" plays as the "Who Killed Archie?" storyline replays with the focus on Marsden. The BBC described the episode: "DCI Marsden's caught Archie's killer – or she's collared someone for it at least. But Hello!? Was it Phil she was looking for? Don't tell us you didn't spot the latent chemistry between this pair. Shirley must have been livid. We wouldn't like to surmise what the DCI planned to do with Phil if she got him behind bars. But we do hope this is one Endless Love that will be revisited..."

=== Marsden's Video Diaries episodes ===
| No. | Title | Duration | Original release date |
|---|---|---|---|
| 1 | "Video Diary 1" | 0:53 | 25 December 2009 |
Marsden is called into work on Christmas Day to investigate the murder of Archie Mitchell. She hopes it will lead to Phil Mitchell being arrested.
| 2 | "Video Diary 2" | 0:48 | 1 January 2010 |
Eight days into the murder investigation, Marsden still does not have any leads but presents an artificial fingernail that was found with the body.
| 3 | "Video Diary 3" | TBA | 7 January 2010 |
Marsden interviews Sam Mitchell and Peggy Mitchell.
| 4 | "Video Diary 4" | 1:06 | 8 January 2010 |
The police get an anonymous tip that the killer might be Archie's fiancée, Janine Butcher, as Archie was seen throwing her out of The Queen Victoria pub on Christmas Day.
| 5 | "Video Diary 5" | 1:07 | 18 January 2010 |
Ian Beale is questioned about his sexual relationship with Janine Butcher, and Marsden plays him an audio recording of him and Janine talking dirty.
| 6 | "Video Diary 6" | 0:50 | 28 January 2010 |
Marsden talks about it being Archie's funeral the next day and how they will all be speaking well of him.
| 7 | "Video Diary 7" | 0:50 | 8 February 2010 |
Marsden mentions that she has questioned five suspects and arrested one person but that they have not told her anything to help with her investigation.
| 8 | "Video Diary 8" | 0:42 | 11 February 2010 |
Marsden has got the forensic results back.
| 9 | "Video Diary 9: Case Closed" | 1:05 | 19 February 2010 |
Marsden remembers back on the case but gives up and closes the case. She puts it down to "the one that got away".

== Reception ==
When Marsden returned in December 2002, Ian Hyland of The Mirror said he disliked the "smouldering" sexual tension between Phil and Marsden. Jo Atkison of the Western Mail discussed the Marsden-Kate-Phil storyline, saying, "Betrayal with a capital B is the order of the day in the Square this week. It's the cop Kate plot I'm interested in. To shop or not to shop is a dilemma that Kate finds hard to cope with as she waits for the confession that will nail Phil for good". In an interview with the East Anglian Daily Times, Stanton remarked that she was frequently asked to have her photo taken due to her role in EastEnders.

Real-life police detectives criticised the portrayals of detectives Marsden and her colleague DC Wayne Hughes in the show, saying that viewers who see them talking to residents about the case and accepting bribes may believe that the police operate that way in reality. The BBC insisted that a police consultant was used, adding that "this is heightened fiction and all the things that we show might not always represent real life." A spokesperson said, "We always have a police consultant on shows like this that we go to before casting." Jane Simon and Brian McIver described Marsden as having an "appetite for making random arrests". Simon added, "While the list of suspects includes the entire northern hemisphere, it's time for DCI Marsden to make another of her daily arrests. Like a Formula One pit stop, she has got it down to a fine art." Kevin O'Sullivan of the Sunday Mirror commented on the "Who Killed Archie?" storyline: "Despite widespread apathy, Albert Square's Cockney rabble trundle on with the life-sapping saga of Who Killed Archie? Who gives a toss? While potential murderers Phil, Ian, Bradley (Charlie Clements) and the gang hint furtively at their guilt, the absurd DCI Marple – sorry Marsden – keeps arresting bunny-boiler Ronnie without a shred of evidence. "I've spent 20 years building a career on hunches," bragged Miss Marsden. Yeah, and you've made it all the way to Walford nick. A real high flyer!"

In 2015, Laura-Jayne Tyler from Inside Soap bemoaned Marsden's return, saying "Can someone please explain to us why DCI Marsden is now in charge of the Lucy Beale case? She couldn't catch a bus, let along a killer."
