= Joshua Pascoe =

English actor (born 1995)

- Born: Joshua Bill Pascoe; 29 May 1995 (age 31); Sutton, London, England
- Occupation: Actor
- Years active: 2007–present
- Television: EastEnders

Joshua Bill Pascoe (born 29 May 1995) is an English actor. He is known his role as Ben Mitchell in the BBC soap opera EastEnders between 2010 and 2012. For his portrayal of Ben, he was nominated for Villain of the Year at the 2012 British Soap Awards.

== Early life ==
Joshua Bill Pascoe was born on 29 May 1995 in Sutton, London, to Gary and Sheree Pascoe. His parents separated and Pascoe lived with his father in London. He attended Italia Conti Academy of Theatre Arts, where he was suspended for bullying.

== Career ==
Pascoe made his first television appearance in Gina's Laughing Gear in 2007. In October 2010, it was announced that Pascoe had been cast as Ben Mitchell in the BBC soap opera EastEnders, taking over the role from previous actor Charlie Jones. He made his first appearance in December 2010. The character of Ben subsequently came out as gay during Pascoe's portrayal, as well as having a one-night stand with Lola Pearce (Danielle Harold), which results in the conception of their daughter, Lexi. In May 2012, it was announced that Pascoe would be leaving the role at the end of his storyline at the time, after Ben killed Heather Trott (Cheryl Fergison) by hitting her over the head with a picture frame. Pascoe made his last appearance as Ben in August 2012 when the character goes to prison for manslaughter. The character was recast to Harry Reid following Ben's reintroduction in September 2014.

In October 2014, Pascoe appeared in an episode of the BBC sitcom Not Going Out as Raymond, known as "Razor", a gang member who mugs Lucy Adams (Sally Bretton). He went on to appear in the short films Offbeat (2016), Just Charlie (2017) and A Suburban Fairytale (2021). He also appeared in the pantomimes Cinderella (2015) and Snow White and the Seven Dwarfs (2016). In 2026, Pascoe signed to W1 Elite, a talent agency founded by his former EastEnders co-star Danniella Westbrook. He also joined OnlyFans and began sharing explicit content, as well as selling his used socks and underwear.

== Personal life ==
In May 2012, Pascoe was arrested on suspicion of sexual assault. He was subsequently released on bail. In August 2017, Pascoe was filmed using racist language whilst on a night out after his wallet had been stolen.

== Filmography ==
Year	Title	Role	Notes	Ref.
2007	Gina's Laughing Gear	Kevin	Episode: "Life in the Underpass"	
2010–2012	EastEnders	Ben Mitchell	Regular role	
2014	Not Going Out	Raymond "Razor"	Episode: "Mugging"	
2016	Offbeat	Cassius	Short film	
2017	Just Charlie	Gregg	Short film	

== Stage ==
Year	Title	Role	Venue	Ref.
2015	Cinderella	Dame	Grove Theatre, Dunstable	
2016	Snow White and the Seven Dwarfs	Muddles	UK tour	

== Awards and nominations ==
Year	Award	Category	Work	Result	Ref.
2012	British Soap Awards	Villain of the Year	EastEnders	Nominated	
