= Charlie Chambers =

English actor (born 1996)

- Born: 23 June 1996 (age 30); London, England
- Other name: Charlie Chambers
- Occupation: Actor
- Years active: 2006–present
- Television: EastEnders; McDonald & Dodds

Charlie Jones (born 23 June 1996), known professionally as Charlie Chambers, is an English actor. He is known for portraying the role of Ben Mitchell in the BBC soap opera EastEnders between 2006 and 2010. In 2020, he appeared in the BBC drama Noughts + Crosses and the film Jingle Jangle: A Christmas Journey, before portraying DC Samuel Goldie in the ITV crime drama McDonald & Dodds between 2022 and 2024.

== Life and career ==
Chambers was born Charlie Jones on 23 June 1996 in London, England. In 2006, he was cast in the role of Ben Mitchell in the BBC soap opera EastEnders. He portrayed the role for four years, during which time he was involved in a child abuse storyline at the hands of Stella Crawford (Sophie Thompson), the girlfriend of his character's father Phil Mitchell (Steve McFadden). He departed the role in June 2010 and the character was recast to Joshua Pascoe later in the year.

Chambers did not act for the next decade and later adopted Charlie Chambers as his professional name. In 2020, he appeared in two episodes of the BBC drama Noughts + Crosses as Danny Hickson. Later that year, he portrayed a mail courier in the American film Jingle Jangle: A Christmas Journey. Between 2022 and 2024, Jones portrayed DC Samuel Goldie in the ITV crime drama McDonald & Dodds.

== Filmography ==
Year	Title	Role	Notes	Ref.
2006–2010	EastEnders	Ben Mitchell	Regular role	
2020	Noughts + Crosses	Danny Hickson	Recurring role	
2020	Jingle Jangle: A Christmas Journey	Mail Courier	Film	
2022–2024	McDonald & Dodds	DC Samuel Goldie	Main role	
