= Ben Mitchell (EastEnders) =

Fictional character from EastEnders

- EastEnders character
- Max Bowden as Ben Mitchell (2020)
- Portrayed by: Matthew Silver (1996–1998); Morgan Whittle (1999–2001); Charlie Jones (2006–2010); Joshua Pascoe (2010–2012); Harry Reid (2014–2018); Max Bowden (2019–2025)
- Duration: 1996–2001; 2006–2012; 2014–2025
- First appearance: Episode 1266; 21 March 1996
- Last appearance: Episode 7203; 8 October 2025
- Introduced by: Corinne Hollingworth (1996); Matthew Robinson (1999); John Yorke (2001); Kate Harwood (2006); Bryan Kirkwood (2010); Dominic Treadwell-Collins (2014); Kate Oates (2019); Ben Wadey (2025)
In-universe information
- Occupation: Mechanic; Businessman; Career criminal
- Family: Mitchell/Beale
- Father: Phil Mitchell
- Mother: Kathy Beale
- Stepfather: Gavin Sullivan; Tom "Rocky" Cotton
- Stepmother: Sharon Watts; Kat Slater
- Half-brothers: Ian Beale; Raymond Dawkins; Albie Watts; Dennis Rickman Jnr (adoptive)
- Half-sisters: Donna Ludlow; Louise Mitchell
- Husband: Callum Highway (2021–present)
- Daughters: Lexi Pearce
- Grandfathers: Eric Mitchell
- Grandmothers: Peggy Mitchell
- Uncles: Grant Mitchell; Ted Hills
- Aunts: Sam Mitchell
- Nephews: Peter Beale; Bobby Beale
- Nieces: Lucy Beale; Peggy Taylor
- First cousins: Tony Hills; Sarah Hills; Mark Fowler; Courtney Mitchell; Ricky Branning
- Other relatives: Aunt Sal; Billy Mitchell; Ronnie Mitchell; Roxy Mitchell; Archie Mitchell; Lola Pearce; Will Mitchell; Janet Mitchell; Jamie Mitchell

Ben Mitchell is a fictional character from the BBC soap opera EastEnders, who has been played by six different actors since his introduction on 21 March 1996. Matthew Silver appeared as an infant Ben between 1996 and 1998, and Morgan Whittle played him as a toddler between 1999 and 2001. After a five-year absence from the series, Charlie Jones assumed the role of Ben in 2006. In 2010, the character was recast with Joshua Pascoe in the role, who made his first appearance on 13 December 2010. Pascoe quit the role in 2012 and Ben departed on 24 August 2012. Ben's return was announced in May 2014 with Harry Reid in the role; Ben returned on 22 September 2014. Reid was written out of the series in 2017 and Ben departed on 12 January 2018. Ben was reintroduced in 2019 with the role recast to Max Bowden. Ben returned on 1 April 2019. In December 2023, it was announced Bowden would exit the role. Ben departed the series on 28 March 2024, after being extradited to America for credit card fraud. In May 2025, it was reported Bowden would reprise the role for a "brief stint" for later in the year at the request of producer Ben Wadey. In August, it was announced Ben would return for the funeral of his father-in-law, Jonno Highway (Richard Graham). Ben returned during the 6 October episode and departed in the 8 October episode.

Ben's storylines include: a feud between the show's Mitchell and Beale families for his custody; developing a love of dance and the arts, which is a source of tension between him and his father, Phil Mitchell (Steve McFadden); being physically and mentally abused by Phil's girlfriend Stella Crawford (Sophie Thompson); struggling to come to terms with his homosexuality and then attempting to hide it before coming out; being imprisoned for manslaughter after unintentionally killing Heather Trott (Cheryl Fergison); having a daughter, Lexi Pearce, with Lola Pearce (Danielle Harold), finding out his mother Kathy Beale (Gillian Taylforth) is still alive after faking her own death, relationships with Paul Coker (Jonny Labey) and the closeted Callum Highway (Tony Clay), coming to terms with Paul's death in a homophobic attack, being shot by Hunter Owen (Charlie Winter), blackmailing Martin Fowler (James Bye), losing his hearing after sustaining an injury during a boat crash, going into crime with Danny Hardcastle (Paul Usher), featuring in a male rape storyline, in which Ben is raped by Lewis Butler (Aidan O'Callaghan), suffering from bulimia, coping with Lola's death, and being sent to prison in America for credit card fraud.

As played by Jones, Ben received generally poor reviews from critics. Grace Dent of The Guardian wrote several negative opinion pieces on the character, and contacted the BBC with a list of suggestions for humorous storylines in which he could be killed off. However, the storyline where Ben was abused by Stella won "Best Storyline" at the 2007 Inside Soap Awards, and was nominated for the "Best Soap Storyline" accolade at the TV Quick and TV Choice Awards. In 2012, Pascoe was nominated "Villain of the Year", but lost out to Andrew Lancel (Coronation Street). Lisa O'Connell, also writing for The Guardian, was complimentary of Ben's later, protracted coming out storyline, which she called "a perfect foundation for years of dramatic conflict".

== Casting and characterisation ==
Ben as portrayed by Charlie Jones in 2006 (left) and Joshua Pascoe in 2010 (right), with a "harder edge" in the latter depiction

Having previously appeared as a baby and a toddler, Ben returned to EastEnders in 2006 played by child actor Charlie Jones. Jones was cast alongside Megan Jossa, who would play his cousin Courtney Mitchell. While Ben is partially deaf, Jones is a hearing actor. The Guardian's Rebecca Atkinson suggested that, as only the second disabled character in EastEnders's history, Ben was introduced to fulfil a BBC quota. She criticised Jones's casting, and opined, "The use of able-bodied actors to play disabled characters is endemic. Maybe in theory there's nothing wrong with that, but while real disabled people are invisible it is downright offensive to persistently cast able-bodied people in disabled roles." Scott Matthewman of The Stage sympathised with Atkinson's complaint, but defended Jones's casting: "it's hard enough to find good child actors who can cope with a soap opera environment at age 10, let alone ones that fit a character's physical requirement set out the best part of a decade earlier." Journalist Charlie Swinbourne, himself deaf, welcomed Ben's re-introduction for increasing high-profile deaf representation on television.

During Jones's tenure, Ben was portrayed as being physically weak. McFadden described him as unable "to look after himself" when Ben was on the verge of being sent to a young offenders' institute. He subsequently took boxing lessons, and TV Mag's Gemma Quade noted that Ben "refuse[d] to take the coward's way out" and flee the country with his father, but nonetheless was reduced to tears upon receiving a custodial sentence.

In May 2010, it was announced that Ben would be written out of EastEnders as part of the show's revamp by executive producer Bryan Kirkwood. A spokesperson said that his departure would be "one of the biggest storylines of the summer", with long-lasting repercussions. Confirmation followed that Ben would be recast; Joshua Pascoe assumed the part and expressed his enthusiasm to "[make] the role of Ben [his] own." Pascoe first appeared on 13 December 2010. Allison Maund of Inside Soap observed upon Ben's re-introduction that he bore "very little resemblance to the naive young boy he was before being sent down." A later comment in the same publication contrasted the two portrayals; it described the character under Jones as "sweet young Ben, dancing around to Girls Aloud songs", and observed that as played by Pascoe, he seems "to be dancing to the Devil's tune these days".

Pascoe took a break from the series in May 2011, during which Kirkwood stated that viewers may have failed to connect with his portrayal of Ben, as it differed significantly from Jones'. He deemed Ben a "very complex character" and said, "we will see a softer side to Ben when he returns, but the character has evolved. The character has been brutalised in his young offenders' institute and he's also the son of Phil." Considering the character's potential, Kirkwood envisioned Ben and Jay Mitchell (Jamie Borthwick) becoming the new generation of Mitchell brothers, following on from Phil and Grant.

In May 2012, it was announced that Pascoe would be leaving the role at the end of his current storyline. Pascoe made his last appearance on 24 August 2012 when Ben went to prison for manslaughter. On 14 May 2014, Digital Spy revealed Ben would be returning, with another recast later in the year. Harry Reid's casting as Ben was announced on 18 July. Reid made his first appearance in the role on 22 September 2014.

On 2 October 2017, it was announced that Reid would be leaving the show after the character was axed by executive consultant John Yorke. He confirmed that he would finish filming in December 2017. He made his final appearance on 16 January 2018. One-year later, in January 2019, it was announced that Ben would be returning to the show with the role recast again to Max Bowden, who began filming that same month. He made his first appearance on 1 April 2019. Bowden's incarnation of Ben remained hard-edged and struggled to find a softer side. Bowden believed that the most interesting story was about finding who Ben is "deep down". Ben has "a lot of bravado and a lot to be said about who he portrays himself on the outer, but there's so much history and so much darkness." But he believed that there is a softer side to Ben which he hoped could be fully explored.

== Development ==
=== Introduction (1996) ===
Shortly after Ben's birth in 1996, he became the second character in EastEnders history to contract meningitis—the first being Vicki Fowler in 1989. As a result, he lost his hearing in one ear. This launched a storyline which highlighted "the depth of ignorance surrounding HIV and Aids in Walford", when Ben's parents blamed HIV-positive resident Mark Fowler (Todd Carty) for causing his illness. Phil and Kathy's marriage collapsed by the end of the year; jealous of having to share his wife's attention with Ben, Phil became an alcoholic, and at one point snatched Ben and abandoned him beside a fire. In April 1998, Kathy took Ben and moved to South Africa, where her brother Ted lived. For many years afterwards, Ben and Phil had a long-distance relationship. This led Kate Lock, author of Who's Who in EastEnders to assess in 2000 that away from his father's influence, "the chances of Ben developing normally are probably better than most."

=== Car crash ===
In 2007, Ben was part of a storyline in which he, his father, Ian and Peter Beale (Thomas Law) were involved in a car accident, when the Range Rover they were travelling in crashed into a lake. The scenes cost £1 million to produce and were filmed in Surrey over four days, partly in a specially designed stunt tank. Jones had both a stunt double and dummy to supplement his scenes. Despite being one of the most expensive stunts ever filmed by a soap opera, the episode drew EastEnders' lowest ever audience share and second lowest ratings due to a scheduling conflict with ITV's Emmerdale.

=== Child abuse by Stella Crawford ===
EastEnders scriptwriters worked closely with the NSPCC on the storyline which saw Ben abused by his soon-to-be stepmother, Stella Crawford (Sophie Thompson). According to Thompson, the best aspect of the storyline was that she and Jones "felt so safe and comfortable with each other as actors. And obviously we knew that we were both just telling a story and it was far from real." Explaining the motivation behind Stella's abuse of Ben, she revealed: "As far as Ben's concerned, she sees him as an obstacle which she has to overcome to get what she wants. And the fact she doesn't understand unconditional love, the fact she's never experienced it, goes a long way in explaining why she's treating Ben the way she is. Ultimately, Ben's in her way and she realises that she has a hold over him and she'll use that power to get him out of the way and to get that ring on her finger she has longed for."

=== Sexuality ===
It was reported in July 2011 that Ben would come out as homosexual. He became the third gay character in the series at the time, and the sixteenth in its history. Kirkwood commented, "For EastEnders viewers, it was never a question of if, but more like when Ben Mitchell was going to come out as gay. The Mitchells represent the spirit of EastEnders – tough, loyal and uncompromising. To see a man like Phil learn to deal with, and ultimately accept, his gay son, is a valid story for a drama like EastEnders to embark on." McFadden stated that Phil had never considered the possibility of Ben being gay, rather, he held an idealised view of his son and hoped he would become more like Jay, interested in "normal macho things". He explained that, while Phil could see his son was in turmoil, he was unaware of the depth of it, and believed Ben to be confused about his sexuality because of a prison assault. In contrast, Kirkwood stated his belief that Ben's coming out would not be a surprise to Phil, and that he had "probably been dreading this news for many years." Scriptwriter Christopher Reason said that Ben's storyline would be a long-running one, which would see him "learn wrath" from his father.

=== Heather Trott's murder and 2012 exit ===
It was announced Fergison would be leaving EastEnders in 2012. Daniel Kilkelly of Digital Spy later reported Heather would be murdered by Ben during an argument at her flat. Kilkelly revealed further details of Heather's exit on 11 March 2012. He reported that Heather would die when Ben hits her with a picture frame, causing her to fall back and hit her head on a kitchen counter. In May 2012, it was announced that Pascoe was axed from the role. It was confirmed that the truth would come out about Heather Trott's (Cheryl Fergison) murder which would ultimately lead to Ben's departure, but how the truth would be revealed was being closely kept under wraps by EastEnders bosses although they did say it will be the outcome everyone is hoping for. He made his final appearance on 24 August 2012.

=== Departure (2018) ===
On 2 October 2017, it was announced that Ben would be written out of the soap again as part of an "explosive storyline". A show spokesperson confirmed the departure and commented, "Harry has been a great addition to the cast and we wish him all the best for the future." Following the news of Reid's departure, EastEnders fans started to launch a petition to save Ben Mitchell from the axe and "don't lose the best Ben" that EastEnders had. After stealing a large sum of money, Ben leaves Walford for Calais after departing on a ferry. Ben's departure and Reid's final episodes in the role is originally broadcast on 12 January 2018. Reid explained that Ben leaves following the deaths of Abi and his boyfriend, Paul Coker (Jonny Labey), and a failed relationship with Luke Browning (Adam Astill). The actor believed that Ben had made the correct choice about leaving, but admitted his method was not ideal. He added that Phil would feel "very angry" and "betrayed" if he discovered Ben stole the money. Reid was pleased with his exit storyline and told Kilkelly (Digital Spy) that he would miss portraying "a very layered character".

=== Reintroduction and recast (2019) ===
Bowden began filming with the show in January 2019. Ben returns with his daughter, Lexi Pearce, and her mother, Ben's cousin Lola Pearce (Danielle Harold). He returned in the episode broadcast on 1 April 2019.

=== Relationship with Callum Highway ===
Producers lined up a new romance story between Ben and Callum Highway (Tony Clay), who is in a heterosexual relationship with Whitney Dean (Shona McGarty). The story was part of senior executive producer Kate Oates' plan to further diversify the show with more LGBT stories. She also believed that Callum was ideal for a story about exploring sexuality. Their involvement begins when Ben witnesses Callum injuring himself to avoid going back to the army. Ben sells a stolen van to Callum which is later detained by police. Callum confronts Ben about the scam and an argument ensues. The scene becomes sensual as the pair get close and Ben realises Callum's attraction to men. Ben teases Callum, who denies the accusations and states that he is happy with Whitney. Callum becomes violent and punches Ben when he continues to mock his sexuality. The scenes were not publicised in advance spoilers and came as a surprise to viewers. The following day at the British Soap Awards, Clay revealed that the story would be explored further. He said that the scene demonstrated that "something's clicked there, and something's sparked between them."

The story progressed rapidly over a weeks worth of episodes. Ben taunts Callum over his sexuality and he fears that Whitney will discover the truth. Callum asks his brother Stuart Highway (Ricky Champ) for help. Stuart locates Ben and threatens him to leave Callum alone. Writers also created scenes to get Ben and Callum closer, which play out at the latter's house warming party. Callum's flat was previously occupied by Ben's dead boyfriend Paul. Ben gets drunk and goes into Paul's old bedroom where he confides in Callum about how Paul's murder affected him. The show soon aired the pair's first kiss after Callum admits to Ben that he is lonely. They get into a passionate embrace and begin an affair.

Clay told Daniel Kilkelly from Digital Spy that the Ben and Callum's affair would create typical EastEnders drama with "a bit of a fallout". He described the kiss as a "moment of ecstasy" and Callum felt "wonderful" with Ben. When the realisation of his infidelity occurs, Clay believed Callum feels ashamed for his treatment of Whitney. Callum's guilt spurs him on to proposing marriage to Whitney. Clay explained that there is "a massive contrast" between Ben and Callum but noted they shared some similarities and connections. He added "Callum may not just be someone that Ben can toy with – there's something there." Ben and Callum may be "polar opposites" but they both have a difficult relationship with their fathers. Bowden told Kilkelly that the "most interesting thing" is exploring their family backgrounds with similar upbringings. He stated that "they have common ground and Ben sees that. It is the first time I've been on the square and I've found common ground with someone." Bowden also believed that Callum never really found "common ground" with another character until he met Ben. Clay agreed and added that their understanding of each other creates their romantic connection.

The story provoked an instant positive reaction from media and viewer interest. Metro's Lindsay branded them "soap's most exciting couple in years." He opined that "vengeful and bitter" Ben getting together with "awkward chap" Callum "sounds preposterous". But their "electric" kiss scene sent "fans wild". When asked by Lindsay about the "fandom", Clay stated "I'm ready, bring it on! I'm prepared! [...] It's really exciting to be part of a storyline in EastEnders that grips people."

=== Departure and return (2024–2025) ===
On 30 December 2023, it was announced Bowden would exit the role in early 2024. A spokesperson for the soap said: "Max will be leaving EastEnders next year. We wish him all the best for the future." Bowden's final appearance aired on 28 March 2024.

In May 2025, it was reported Bowden would reprise the role for a "brief stint" later in the year. Bowden's reprise of Ben was originally reported via The Sun, with claims that the character was one of the top returns of new producer Ben Wadey, who approached Bowden about reprising the role. That August, BBC announced Ben's return—alongside Stuart Highway (Champ)—would coincide with the funeral of Callum's father Jonno Highway (Richard Graham). Speaking to Inside Soap, Bowden revealed he was surprised at being asked to reprise the role, but described the experience as "lovely to do". He further revealed he would be open to a full-time return should the timing be right. His stint aired from 6–8 October 2025.

== Storylines ==
=== 1996–2000 ===
Ben is born to Phil Mitchell (Steve McFadden) and his then wife Kathy Beale (Gillian Taylforth) in March 1996. Ben becomes ill and is rushed to hospital, where he is diagnosed with meningitis and he is left partially deaf in one ear. As Kathy gives Ben all her affection, Phil turns to alcohol and has an affair with Lorna Cartwright (Janet Dibley), resulting in the breakdown of their marriage. In 1998, Kathy moves to South Africa and takes Ben with her. He accompanies her on two return visits in 1999 before returning with her to South Africa in early 2000. In 2001, Kathy marries a man named Gavin Sullivan (then an unseen character; later played by Paul Nicholas). The same year, Ben briefly returns to stay with Phil who then takes him back to South Africa.

=== 2006–2012 ===
In 2006, the residents hear that Kathy and Gavin have been killed in a car accident, so Ben (now played by Charlie Jones) returns to England to live with his half-brother, Ian Beale (Adam Woodyatt). He eventually moves in with Phil, after Phil wins a long custody battle. Ben dislikes Phil's new girlfriend Stella Crawford (Sophie Thompson), who in turn feels that Ben is intruding on their relationship. She abuses Ben physically and psychologically, from burning him with a hot spoon, also attempting to spoil his friendship with Abi Branning (Lorna Fitzgerald) when she discovers this, to threatening to kill Phil if Ben tells anyone about her actions. Phil and Stella become engaged. On their wedding day in July 2007, Ben admits that Stella has been abusing him; she commits suicide by jumping from a roof. Phil, a recovering alcoholic, begins drinking again in the aftermath, but resumes a life of sobriety for Ben's sake.

Unbeknown to Phil, Ben develops an interest in dancing. He secretly takes classes, passing a dance exam, and is ultimately able to gain Phil's approval. In March 2010, Phil's daughter Louise Mitchell (Brittany Papple) comes to stay with the Mitchell family. She steals Ben's diary and fakes an entry which suggests he is gay. In retaliation, Ben burns Louise's hand the same way Stella burnt his. He later locks Louise in a summerhouse for a day in May 2010, then pretends to find her to earn approval from his father. Louise blames Jordan Johnson (Michael-Joel David Stuart), an acquaintance of Ben's, but when Phil sees burn marks on Louise's arm, she reveals that Ben is to blame. Phil worries Ben is copying Stella, and punches him when he catches Ben about to burn Louise again. Questioned as to why he hurt Louise, Ben claims that Jordan is bullying him. Phil advises Ben to fight back; soon after, Ben attacks Jordan with a spanner, leaving him with a fractured skull. Phil warns him against admitting to the attack, but Ben confesses and moves in with Ian. After hearing from Crown Court Ben could spend time in juvenile detention, Phil plans to send him to live with his brother Grant Mitchell (Ross Kemp) abroad, but Ben refuses thanks to his grandmother, Peggy Mitchell (Barbara Windsor), making him change his mind, after Phil's girlfriend Shirley Carter (Linda Henry) overhears Phil discussing the plans to Ben and receives a five-month sentence as a result. In July 2010, Phil indeed blames Peggy for Ben's sentencing. Ben tells Peggy and Phil he is coping despite being bullied by Cal Childs (Danny Barnham), and when the Mitchell family discovers this Ben asks them not to visit him.

Ben, (now played by Joshua Pascoe) is released, and arrives home to discover Jay Brown (Jamie Borthwick), the foster child of Phil's relative Billy (Perry Fenwick), has usurped his place in Phil's affections. Ben is jealous of Jay initially but does develop a 'brotherly' relationship with him. Ben vents his anger at those who cross him, punching Phil in the face and pushing Phil's aunt Glenda Mitchell (Glynis Barber) down a flight of stairs for ruining his home coming party.

Ben attends a gym and shares his first kiss with boxer, Duncan Willis (Steven France). When they are seen kissing by shopkeeper Patrick Trueman (Rudolph Walker), Ben throws a brick through Patrick's window and tries to intimidate him into not going public about his homosexuality. Phil observes and misinterprets their altercation, believing Patrick is assaulting Ben. He launches a vendetta against Patrick. After Duncan confronts Ben about his victimisation of Patrick, he tells him their kiss didn't mean anything and cuts ties with him, Ben confesses to Phil. Disgusted his son is gay, Phil pushes Ben away, terrified his homosexuality will ruin his reputation. Ben develops feelings for Christian Clarke (John Partridge), who is also gay but engaged to his boyfriend Syed Masood (Marc Elliott). Ben tries to split them up and attempts to kiss Christian. After being rejected, Ben claims Christian touched him inappropriately as revenge. Phil goes into a violent rampage, hitting Christian with a baseball bat, which prompts Ben to admit the truth. In the wake of this, Phil tries to accept Ben's homosexuality. Billy's granddaughter, Lola Pearce (Danielle Harold), offers to have sex with Ben to test his sexuality. Ben loses his virginity to Lola in October 2011 and concludes that he is definitely gay. Ben is later concerned to discover Lola is pregnant, however she denies he is the father.

Ben continues to feel angst towards Phil for rejecting him. He anonymously stalks Phil, terrorising him with evidence about his past crimes, including a newspaper clip of the death of Steve Owen (Martin Kemp). DCI Jill Marsden (Sophie Stanton), who has been attempting to imprison Phil for over a decade, opens an investigation. She interviews Ben regarding Stella's death in 2007. Ben tells her that Phil forced Stella to jump off a building on threat of being pushed. Phil plans to flee the country before arrest, but is stalled by Ben, who reveals himself as his father's stalker. Phil is charged with Stella's murder and when the Mitchell family discover Ben's involvement in his father's arrest, they disown him. Ben's brother Ian eventually discovers Ben lied to DCI Marsden and informs the police. Phil is released; however, Ben mistakenly believes he has been betrayed by Heather Trott (Cheryl Fergison), who also knows he set Phil up. He confronts Heather in fear and desperation, and hits her over the head with a metal picture frame, killing her. Phil returns from prison moments after Heather's murder. Feeling responsible for his son's behaviour, Phil covers up Ben's involvement with Jay's help, who was present when Heather was killed. Shirley, Phil's fiancée, discovers Heather's body, and as she was her best friend, she vows to find the killer. Worried she will discover the truth, Ben convinces Phil to break-up with Shirley and she is thrown out of their home, while Jay is so traumatised by Heather's murder that he moves out of the Mitchells' flat. Ben and Phil wrestle with guilt and argue regularly, with Phil turning to alcohol. Needing to confide in someone, Ben admits his crime to Ian; the confession contributes to Ian's mental breakdown, and amidst threats from Phil to stay silent, Ian absconds, leaving Phil and Ben searching for him to no avail.

Ben fails to dispose of the photo frame and it is taken by Jean Slater (Gillian Wright), who is collecting for charity. It is put into the charity shop and later is discovered by Shirley, who realises it is the murder weapon. Tracing it back to the Mitchell house, she confronts Phil, believing him to be the killer, but Ben gives himself away during the argument. Shirley is furious and nearly drowns Ben, but Phil intervenes and convinces Shirley to talk to Ben about why he killed Heather. However, they find Ben gone and he confesses to the police. DCI Marsden does not believe him at first, but he is later arrested for murder. He is charged the next day, and Phil's solicitor Ritchie Scott (Sian Webber) informs Phil that Ben could face up to 10 years in prison. Phil tries to persuade Ben to change his statement, however Ben insists that he needs to be punished. Ben refuses to have any contact with anyone until he is released. In October 2012, Ben's murder charge is dropped and Phil is told he will be tried for manslaughter, to which he will plead guilty. Ben then agrees to a visit from Phil, and Phil plans to tell Ben that he is the father of Lola's daughter, Lexi Pearce, though he decides not to. Ben is sentenced to four years imprisonment and discovers he is Lexi's father after a visit from Lola.

=== 2014–2024 ===
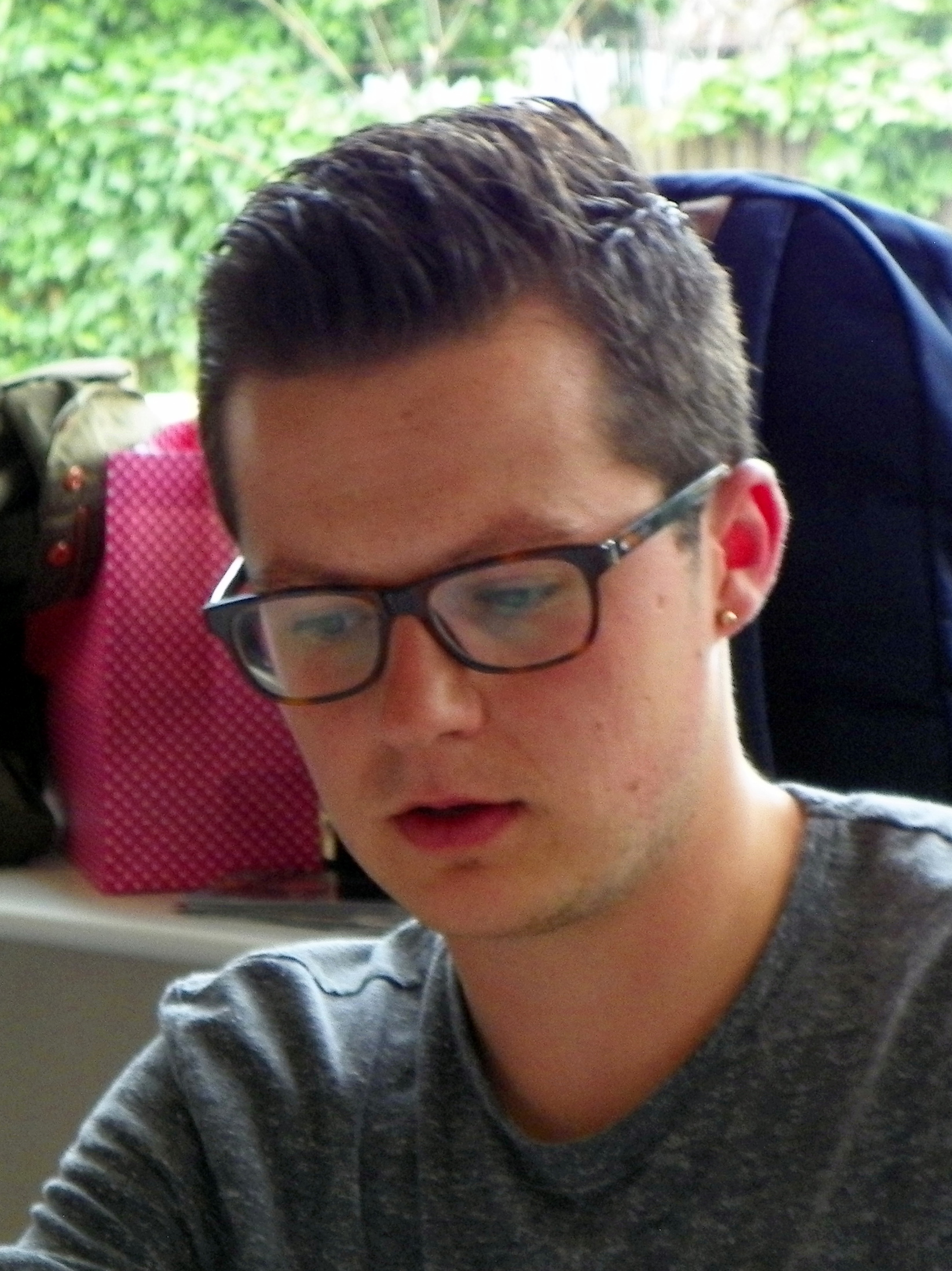
Harry Reid played Ben Mitchell from 2014 to 2018.

After witnessing Ian's grief following his daughter Lucy Beale's (Hetti Bywater) murder (see "Who Killed Lucy Beale?"), Phil decides to get in touch with Ben; however, Ritchie reveals that Ben was released the previous month. Phil cannot get hold of him, although Jay has seen Ben twice since his release. In September Ben (now played by Harry Reid) returns to Walford when he learns that Phil is having an affair with Shirley days before his wedding to Sharon Rickman (Letitia Dean). Ben initially tries to convince his father to reunite with Shirley, but forms a bond with Sharon when she accepts him into the family and acts as Phil's best man at the wedding. After the wedding, Shirley shoots Phil whilst struggling with Sharon. Ronnie asks Ben and Jay to get rid of the gun. Ben meets Johnny Carter (Sam Strike) and is attracted to him, but when Johnny makes a move Ben reacts badly and says he is not gay and that his interest in men was a phase. He then starts a relationship with Abi in an effort to prove it to Phil and Johnny. When Johnny later leaves the square, he tells Ben not to hide who he truly is. Although Ben continues to deny his attraction to men, he later misinterprets a brotherly moment with Jay and tries to kiss him. Jay later tells Abi, but then lies and says he made it up when he sees how upset she is. Ben eventually confesses to Abi that he's still attracted to men but, desperate to keep him, Abi decides to stay with him, saying their relationship is about more than sex. However, Ben is later seen looking at a gay contacts app on his smartphone.

Ben had instructed Jay to bury Lucy's purse and phone, which has been missing since her death. Denise Fox (Diane Parish) digs them up in Patrick Trueman's (Rudolph Walker) allotment and takes them to Ian, who calls the police before Ben convinces him that he found them on Good Friday in a bag in the Square and had no part in Lucy's murder. Ian lies to the police and protects Ben. When Phil is arrested on suspicion of attempting to kill Ronnie, he puts Ben in charge of his garage. Max Branning (Jake Wood) starts helping him with deals, only to trick Ben into signing over the garage to him as revenge for the death of his girlfriend Emma Summerhayes (Anna Acton), which Max has blamed Phil for, though Phil eventually gets the garage back. Ben then starts a sexual relationship with Paul Coker (Jonny Labey), whilst maintaining his relationship with Abi. Ben grows frustrated with Abi's controlling behaviour, and she is suspicious, so Ben has sex with her to allay her fears. Phil catches Ben and Paul half-naked together at the car lot, and angrily tells Ben to leave as he broke his trust, both in hiding his homosexuality and being loyal to Abi. Ben ends his relationship with Paul, leaving Paul heartbroken. Paul tries to speak to Ben on numerous occasions, but fails to win Ben's affections over. Ben and Abi decide to find their own home after realising they can no longer stay with Phil after Sharon leaves him. Ben and Paul flirt and arrange to go to the cinema but when Abi finds them and leaves in anger feeling Ben is not taking their plans seriously, Ben follows her, leaving Paul alone. Paul later tells Ben that he loves him and says Ben must decide who really wants and accept who he really is. To give himself more time, Ben books tickets for Abi to visit a friend on holiday, and then tells Paul he loves him back. Jay sees them kissing, and tells Ben to admit to Abi that he loves Paul. When Phil is later sent to hospital and informed that he will be dead within 12 months unless he has a liver transplant, Ben, alongside Sharon and Jay, refuse to visit him, and Sharon has him change the locks on the house so Phil cannot enter when he is discharged.

Ben comes to terms with the fact that his mother Kathy has returned to Walford after faking her own death at the hands of her husband, Gavin. He initially refuses to talks to her, disgusted at the fact that she pretended to be dead for almost ten years, but they reconcile. After Abi returns from her trip to Paris with her friend, she realises that Ben may be having an affair with Paul. Ben plans to break up with Abi, but Abi has been manipulated by Babe Smith (Annette Badland), who tells her to announce she is pregnant so that Ben will not leave her. Abi does this publicly and then plans to get pregnant for real but Ben says they cannot have sex because he thinks he may have caught an STI from a stranger, so Abi resorts to having sex with Lee Carter (Danny-Boy Hatchard) to try to get pregnant. Ben discovers he has chlamydia, and Abi also has it. She later fakes a miscarriage in an attempt to end her pregnancy lie, but when she upsets Babe, Babe writes Ben a letter revealing the truth. The letter is read by Louise (now played by Tilly Keeper), who has returned, and to keep her from showing it to Ben, Abi allows her to use Phil's credit card. When Ben finds the card, he confronts Abi, but she believes he found the letter so inadvertently reveals she was never pregnant and says that Louise was blackmailing her. Ben takes revenge on Louise in The Queen Vic by putting her head in the toilet. He then seduces Abi and takes her top off, but then drags her into the main bar of the pub, revealing via a karaoke microphone that she invented the pregnancy. Ben then resumes his relationship with Paul with the support of most of his friends and family. Following an agreement with Les and Pam, who make plans to retire and leave Walford, Ben and Paul make arrangements to become the new managers of Coker and Sons. In celebration, they spend a night out together, and are not seen again the next day. Ben's family are alerted by the police that a dead young man whom they believe to be Ben has been found, having been involved in a fight, but upon inspection, the victim is revealed to be Paul. Ben is found by Buster Briggs (Karl Howman) after managing to make his way back to Walford, albeit with major injuries. He explains that he and Paul were cornered by four large men and chased after coming out of a night club, and were separated when running away. When informed of Paul's death, he lashes out in a violent rage, before breaking down in tears in Kathy and Phil's arms.

Ben later visits the Queen Vic to join his neighbours in a toast to Paul's memory, but Paul's grandmother Pam Coker (Lin Blakley) blames him for Paul's death and dubs him the worst thing to ever happen to Paul, wishing he had died instead. Ben wishes the same, and later confesses to Johnny (now played by Ted Reilly) that he and Paul were victims of homophobic namecalling, and despite Paul insisting they ignore the culprits, Ben confronted the men, causing the attack, and thus blames himself for Paul's death. Johnny encourages Ben to report this to the police, and Ben recognises one of the attackers outside the police station. Using the man's car registration number, he gets an address and demands a gun from Phil to seek revenge. Phil tricks Ben and does not get a gun, so Ben goes missing. He returns, having failed to find the man. Paul's body is released, and Ben realises Jay has been using cocaine. Jay and Ben decide to help each other move on from their problems, so Ben decides to let the police find the attackers. However, Ben and Jay change their minds, agreeing to take revenge and then leave Walford together. Louise worries that Ben may be about to get into trouble so asks help from Paul's grandfather, Les Coker (Roger Sloman), who tells Ben not to put his family through what he and Pam are going through, as Ben could be killed too. Ben does promise not to track down Paul's killers but when Jay finds an address and says Ben will regret doing nothing, Ben and Jay leave. They return to Walford after Louise calls to the police, but are then kidnapped by the attackers at the Mitchell home. Ben is rescued by his uncle, Grant, and Grant's son Mark Fowler (Ned Porteous). Jay, who the killers trapped in a van, flees when the police appear. Ben later says a farewell to Jay, who leaves Walford shortly after Paul's funeral and Jay says that they will always be brothers. However, he returns not too long after. Not wanting Phil to die, Ben decides to donate part of his liver to him, but a doctor tells them it will still take time. Despite Ben's discovery that Phil has cut him out of his will, he proceeds with his plan to donate part of his liver, but he is refused by the hospital who are unsatisfied with his answers and emotional responses when interviewed. However, Phil eventually gets a liver transplant.

While Phil and Sharon are on holiday, Ben and Jay move to their own house (18 Albert Square). On Ben's 21st birthday, Jay throws the pair a housewarming party, where Ben and Johnny have a one-night stand after getting drunk. The next day, they both worry that the other wants a relationship but are relieved to realise they just see each other as friends. After Louise suffers severe burns following a disaster at a school prom, against Sharon's request Ben calls Phil who is Italy recovering from his transplant. Ben signs the paperwork for The Arches when Phil decides to hand it over to him and Sharon is left stunned when he decides to give Jay the car lot land. Kathy insists to Phil that he justifies his reasons to Ben about giving Jay the car lot land that is worth more than The Arches. Ben finds a solicitor's letter of Phil's that mentions Raymond and after confronting Phil, Phil tells Ben that Raymond is his half-brother. Ben is angry with Phil for making him feel second best to Phil and Sharon's other children. Ben learns that Phil offered Jay the car lot out of guilt for killing his apparent biological father, Alan Hall, a victim of the car lot fire that Phil had caused 23 years previously in an insurance scam. After a fight with Jay, they make amends.

Ben meets Luke Browning (Adam Astill), the son of James Willmott-Brown (William Boyde), who raped Kathy 30 years previously but is unaware of his identity. They end up kissing and start a sexual relationship, until Ben learns of Luke's family background when Willmott-Brown secretly visits Kathy, and Ben goes to visit Luke with the intention of confronting Willmott-Brown. When Ben meets Willmott-Brown in his office, he confronts him over his actions towards Kathy with a crowbar. Willmott-Brown tells Ben that the sex was consensual and convinces him that he should doubt Kathy's honesty. Ben almost attacks Willmott-Brown but Luke stops him. Feeling that Ben does not trust her, Kathy considers leaving Walford. Ben reluctantly decides to end his relationship with Luke due to the conflicts of interest between Kathy and Willmott-Brown. After a heart to heart with Ben, Kathy decides to remain in Walford and gives Ben and Luke's relationship her blessing. Ben plays a prank on Luke, which backfires when Luke grabs Ben's wrist and threatens him. However, Luke later apologises. Ben accidentally takes Luke's wallet and finds a business card with the words 'Project Dagmar', and confronts Luke about the project as the Dagmar was the bar that Willmott-Brown owned and Kathy worked in when he raped her. Luke lashes out at Ben and physically threatens him. Realising that Ben is a risk to the project being exposed, Luke ends their relationship. Hurt and confused, Ben asks Abi's sister Lauren Branning (Jacqueline Jossa), who works for Luke's firm, Weyland & Co, about the project but she does not know about it. Luke tries to apologise to Ben by buying him a car but Ben continues to reject Luke and he attacks and brutally beats Ben, so Phil asked his old prison cellmate Aidan Maguire (Patrick Bergin) for help and have Luke kidnapped and he is not seen again; it later transpires that Luke was brutally killed by Aidan despite Phil's merely requesting that they scare Luke and not kill him.

Following Luke's death and Willmott-Brown's eventual downfall, Phil joins Aidan in a planned heist and they use The Arches to steal the money. However, the stolen money and jewellery goes missing and it is revealed that Ben realized what was going on and stole it from the funeral home where it was being hidden. He sells the jewellery but keeps one necklace, giving it to Kathy, and then plans to leave the country. He leaves after writing a note for Jay. He is cornered on the ferry by Ian's former wife Mel Owen (Tamzin Outhwaite) who warns him to give her the money or he will soon be dead. Ben refuses, saying he only took what he deserved. Mel makes a phone call to someone, telling them that Ben is all theirs. When Ben arrives in France, he is stunned to find the money has been replaced by newspapers. However, he is relieved to discover an envelope full of cash in his pocket. Ben gleefully heads for a new life, unaware that Aidan's former wife Ciara (Denise McCormack) is watching him.

When Phil and Keanu Taylor (Danny Walters) end up in some trouble in Spain, Phil forges Ben's signature, causing Kathy to call Ben to come home, Ben (now played by Max Bowden) returns with Lola and their daughter, Lexi, and after seeing the trouble Phil is in, he agrees to help him. However, it is soon revealed Ben is planning to steal Phil's money and leave him broke and he makes Lola follow every instruction, causing him to get annoyed when she ignores him and ends up kissing Jay in The Queen Vic, however it's soon revealed Lola has a fiancé called Ewan.

Ben secretly witnesses Callum "Halfway" Highway (Tony Clay) attempting to harm himself in the playground. After Ben talks to Halfway about the incident, Halfway then purchases a van from Ben as a gift to his girlfriend Whitney Dean (Shona McGarty), although he is later pulled over by the police, who inform him that the van is stolen. Halfway confronts Ben and demands a refund; when Halfway attacks him, Ben senses sexual tension and realises that Halfway is attracted to men, which Halfway denies. He then punches Ben when he mocks him. The two later share a kiss. Halfway continues to deny his attraction to men while Ben knows he is living a lie so Halfway proposes to Whitney and she agrees. When Ben learns that Phil has replaced him with Keanu in his will, he is furious. However, he later witnesses Stacey Fowler (Lacey Turner) attack Phil with a wrench, to stop the latter from killing her husband Martin Fowler (James Bye). He tells them to leave the scene, saying he will sort it out. Martin and Stacey go on the run to avoid prison. Ben incriminates Keanu in the attack which leads to the latter's arrest. Ben later attempts to kill Phil in hospital, but is stopped by Jay. When Phil regains consciousness, Ben tells him that Keanu, who has gone on the run with Louise, who is pregnant with his child, attacked him. However, Phil does not believe him and Stacey's cousin Kat Moon (Jessie Wallace) tells him that she attacked him to stop him killing Martin, thereby covering for Stacey. Ben later admits to Phil that Keanu had nothing to do with the attack and that he framed him because he knows about Phil's will. Furious, Phil disowns Ben.

On the day before Halfway and Whitney's wedding, Halfway confesses to Whitney that he kissed Ben, leading her to call off their wedding. Just as Whitney is about to expose Halfway's secret to the packed pub, all of the residents are held hostage by Hunter Owen (Charlie Winter), who has escaped prison. Ben is shot in the siege, but is revived by Sonia Jackson (Natalie Cassidy). The attack on Ben leads to Phil forgiving his son and Ben and Halfway also get together. Martin soon returns to Walford to care for his daughter, Bex Fowler (Jasmine Armfield). He pleads with Ben to dispose of the wrench Stacey used to attack Phil, so that she and his kids can return home. However, Ben blackmails Martin into getting involved in criminal jobs for him, saying he will let Stacey come home when he wants to. Ben does dispose of the wrench but further blackmails Martin with footage of him stealing a car. An angry Martin punches Ben and it is then that a past incident of Martin dangling Ben from a railway bridge when he was a child is revisited. Ben says that he is bigger now and will not back down easily. Martin turns to Jack Branning (Scott Maslen), who has recently rejoined the police for advice, and he gets Ben and his accomplices arrested. Ben is however released on bail. He confronts Martin and the next morning, he tells Martin that he is sorry for what he has put him through and that Stacey is free to return to Walford. However, that evening, Ben and his henchmen kidnap Martin and hang him off the railway bridge, just as Martin did to Ben when he was younger. Ben threatens to have Stacey and their kids killed if she does not stay away and if Martin does not continue working for him.

Phil, who was told by Louise's mother Lisa Fowler (Lucy Benjamin) that Sharon's unborn child is not his, coerces Ben and Keanu to kidnap Jack, who he thinks is the father of the baby. After several hours of interrogation, Phil has a bloodied and bruised Jack released and Ben takes him home, witnessed by Halfway, who becomes suspicious. Ben tries to reason with Phil, who wants to kill the father, but relents and agrees to help Phil. A few days later, Halfway questions Ben about his encounter with Jack and where their relationship is going. To protect Halfway from the Mitchells, Ben breaks up with Halfway, claiming that he does not love him. On Christmas Eve, after hearing identical stories from Keanu and Sharon about a hotel, Phil works out that Keanu is the father and Ben vows to have him killed. On Christmas Day, Ben orders Martin to kill Keanu. However, a hungover Linda Carter (Kellie Bright), who on Christmas Eve had drunkenly fallen asleep in the back of the van Martin uses to kidnap Keanu, saves Keanu's life and helps Martin fake the recording of Keanu's "murder" later shown to Ben. Unaware of this, Ben begins to feel guilty about causing Keanu's "death" and when Halfway returns and proclaims he wants him back, Ben admits his part in having Keanu killed, causing a stunned Halfway to storm out on him.

During the 35th Anniversary week, the Queen Vic boat crashes due to a fight between Keanu, Phil and Ben. When the boat goes down, Ben hits his head and damages his hearing aid. This created the storyline about Ben becoming permanently deaf.

== Reception ==
"The scriptwriters' non-stop torment of Ben Mitchell is just getting silly now. Left partially deaf after contracting meningitis as a baby, he's lost his mum and stepfather, been kidnapped by Martin Fowler, nearly drowned in a sinking Land Rover, been bullied by his dad's (now dead) fiance Stella... and is inescapably related by blood to Ian Beale. About the only good thing to happen to him lately is that he's got new specs."

— Jane Simon of the Daily Mirror on Ben's bad luck.

In 2007, Ben's abuse by Stella won Best Storyline at the Inside Soap Awards, and was nominated as the Best Soap Storyline at the TV Quick and TV Choice Awards.

In 2008, All About Soap included Ben and Stella's child abuse plot in their list of "top ten taboo" storylines of all time. Their writer described it as one of the "taboos which have bravely been broken by soaps."

Ben as played by Jones received generally negative reviews from critics. The Guardian's Grace Dent called him a "spooky little git", and her fellow Guardian writer Daniel Martin deemed him "gormless". As part of an EastEnders-themed drinking game, Digital Spy's Alex Fletcher instructed players to drink beer every time Ben "is spotted whimpering on the stairs". Dent suggested that Phil and Ian's fighting over custody of Ben would turn him into "the next Jeffrey Dahmer", and in an article on the future of Britain's soap opera adolescents, noted that: "Albert Square will no doubt reap what it's sown with tiny, cursed, abused, accident-prone, 11-year-old Ben Mitchell. Oh it's going to be fun and games when Ben turns 16 and finds his inner anger." Continuing this theme, Dent questioned "how far are they going to push this little boy?". She listed the many setbacks and problems Ben had encountered, and suggested that within five years, he would be "on top of the community centre with a rifle using [Peggy's] wig as target practice." Dent later criticised a string of storylines which saw Ben endangered, from his abuse by Stella, to a car accident in which he almost drowned. She stated that his numerous pitfalls were becoming "a touch daft" and likened Ben to the often-killed South Park character Kenny McCormick. Dent hypothesised that the EastEnders scriptwriters "cheer themselves by conjuring up fresh ways to dispense with [Ben]" and said she had contacted the BBC with her own suggestions for creative deaths that might befall him.

Kevin O'Sullivan of the Daily Mirror commented on "ballet-loving Ben's obsession with West End musicals, Judy Garland and dancing," and in 2008 suggested that Ben was gay, pre-dating the character's coming out by three years. The Guardian's Lisa O'Connell welcomed the eventual decision to have Ben come out, and called the plot "a perfect foundation for years of dramatic conflict", which would "no doubt test the filial relationship to the limits." The November 2011 storyline which featured Ben's false molestation accusation against Christian, and Phil's subsequent attack on him, drew criticism from singer George Michael, who stated that EastEnders's depiction of homosexuality was "insulting to the gay community." A BBC spokesperson responded, "EastEnders reflects a wide range of issues. All soap characters face their own trials and tribulations in order to create drama, however EastEnders viewers will know that this is a story about Phil Mitchell who, while struggling with his own relationship with his son, will do anything to protect him."

On several occasions during his tenure, bookmakers have offered odds on Ben's storylines. In 2010, William Hill named him the 11/4 favourite to be found responsible for the whodunnit murder of Archie Mitchell. The culprit was revealed during the series' first live episode – Jones was in third place at 7/1 odds to make a mistake during transmission. After Jones's departure was announced, despite confirmation that the role would be recast, Ben became the favourite to be the next character killed off. In May 2022, Ben Mitchell was raped by Lewis Butler, but his husband, Callum Highway, thought that he had sex with Lewis consensually, for that he broke up with him. Ben went down a very dark path, and took drugs. He had a heart attack as a result.

In 2014, Matt Bramford from What to Watch called that year's recasting of Ben "brilliant". In 2020, Sara Wallis and Ian Hyland from The Daily Mirror placed Ben 35th on their ranked list of the Best EastEnders characters of all time, calling him Phil's "wayward son" and noting how he had been recast several times.

== See also ==
- List of soap opera villains
- List of LGBTQ characters in soap operas
