= Jonny Labey =

British actor

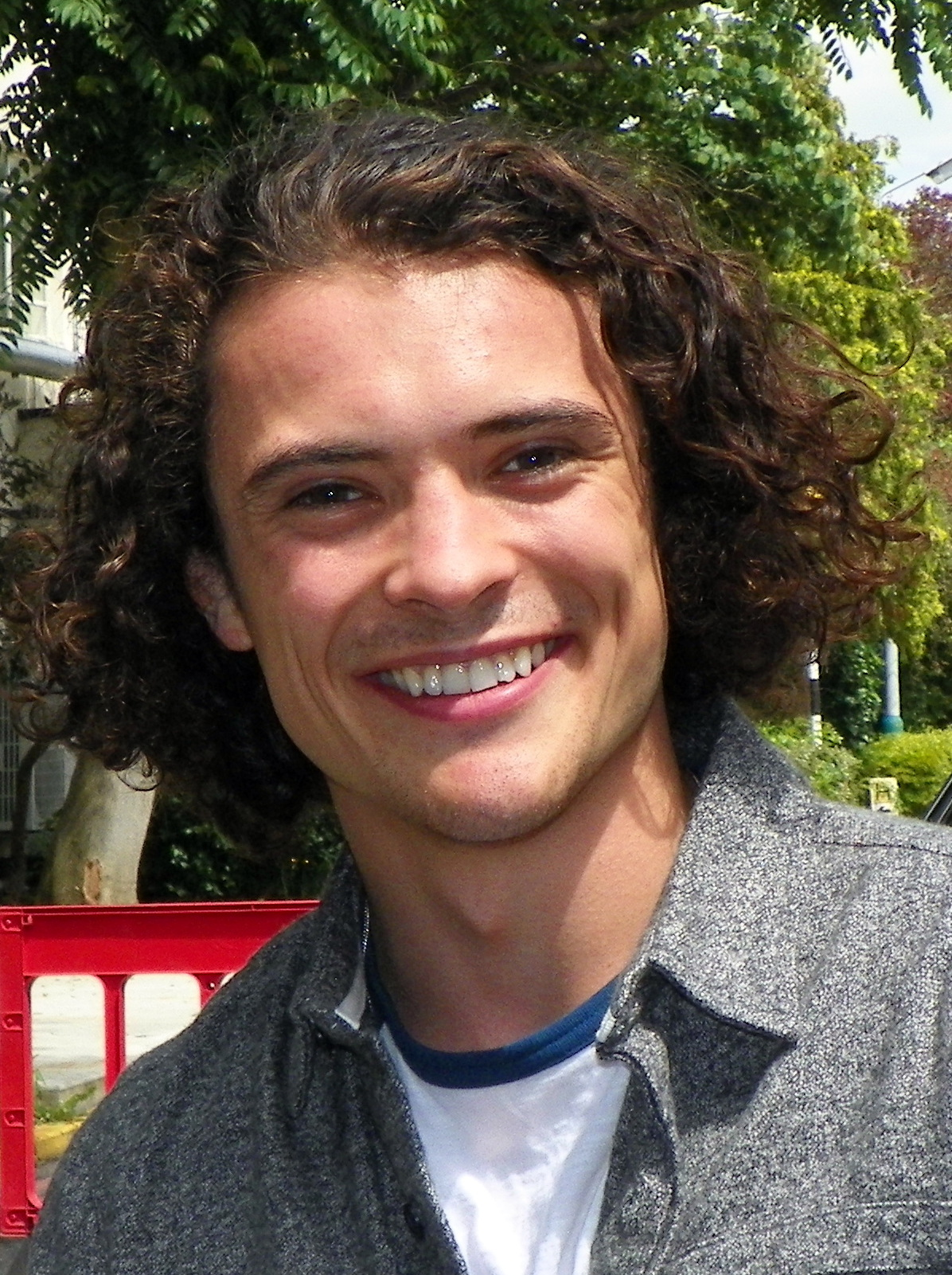
- Labey in 2016
- Born: 15 January 1993 (age 33); Jersey, Channel Islands
- Occupations: Actor; playwright; filmmaker
- Years active: 2010–present
- Television: EastEnders (2015–2016); Hollyoaks (2024–2026)

Jonny Labey (born 15 January 1993) is a Jersey actor, writer and filmmaker. On television, he is known for his roles as Paul Coker in the BBC soap opera EastEnders (2015–2016) and Rex Gallagher in the Channel 4 soap opera Hollyoaks (2024–2026). He is also known for his theatre work. He starred in the West End production of Strictly Ballroom.

== Early life ==
Labey is from Grouville, Jersey. He attended Grouville School and Victoria College. He began dancing aged 5 and appeared in his first stage show aged 8 as part of the Jersey Amateur Dramatic Club. In 2011, he left Jersey to take a BA course at the Doreen Bird College of Performance in Sidcup, London, graduating in 2014. His cousin is fellow actor Philip Labey, known for starring as "Acorn" in various television advertisements for Oak Furnitureland alongside Stephen Critchlow in the mid-2010s.

== Career ==
After graduating, Labey appeared in stage shows including In the Heights and White Christmas. He appeared in Leon Lopez's film Soft Lad. Labey joined the cast of EastEnders in 2015, in the role of Paul Coker, the grandson of Les Coker (Roger Sloman) and Pam Coker (Lin Blakley). The character falls in love with Ben Mitchell (Harry Reid), but was later killed off in a homophobic attack. Labey appeared in EastEnders between 1 June 2015 and 8 September 2016, appearing in 106 episodes. His first role after leaving EastEnders was as the lead character, Rupert Brooke, in the play Verge of Strife, staged in Edinburgh in August 2016. In 2017, he was a contestant on ITV's Dance Dance Dance.

Labey returned to the stage in 2018 when he starred as lead character Scott Hastings in the original West End production of the musical Strictly Ballroom.

In October 2019, he began competing in The X Factor: Celebrity. He was given a safe seat along with Jenny Ryan and Try Star in week 1, but was eliminated in week 2 after landing in the bottom 2 with Martin Bashir as the result went to deadlock. He finished in tenth place. In 2022, he played Jamie Renton in an episode of the BBC soap opera Doctors.

Labey joined the cast of Hollyoaks in June 2024 as Rex, a gangster and Hannah Ashworth's pimp.

Labey co-founded the production company Doing Brave Productions with Margherita Barbieri, through which he made his directorial debut with the short film Swirl State. He wrote the book for the musical Full Swing, which he premiered at Jersey Opera House in 2026.

== Personal life ==
Labey is in a relationship with actress and dancer Margherita Barbieri. Labey is neurodivergent.

== Discography ==
=== Singles ===
==== As featured artist ====
Title	Year	Peak chart positions		Album
Title	Year	UK	SCO	Album
"Run" (as part of The X Factor Celebrities 2019)	2019	87	3	Non-album single

== Filmography ==
Year	Title	Role	Notes
2015	Soft Lad	David	Film
2015–2016	EastEnders	Paul Coker	Regular: 106 Episodes
2015	Children in Need	Himself	Performed in "EastEnders Does Top Hat" medley
2017	Dance Dance Dance	Himself	Winner (First of the series)
2017	Taking The Next Step	Judge	CBBC talent show
2019	The X Factor: Celebrity	Himself	Contestant
2022	Doctors	Jamie Renton	Episode: "Ancient History"
2022	Dare To Dream	Theo	Short film
2022	Shakespeare & Hathaway: Private Investigators	Toby Philkes	Episode: "If Music Be the Food of Love"
2024–2026	Hollyoaks	Rex Gallagher	Regular: 51 Episodes

== Stage ==
Year	Title	Role	Notes
2014	In the Heights	Graffiti Pete	Southwark Playhouse, London
2014	White Christmas	Ensemble	Dominion Theatre, London
2018	Strictly Ballroom	Scott Hastings	Piccadilly Theatre, London
2022	Barefoot in the Park	Paul Bratter	The Mill at Sonning
2022	Rehab	Kid Rock	Playground Theatre, London
2022	Top Hat	Jerry Travers	The Mill at Sonning
2026	Full Swing		Jersey Opera House

== Awards and nominations ==
Year	Award	Category	Result	Ref.
2015	Inside Soap Awards	Best Affair (shared with Harry Reid)	Nominated	
2015	Digital Spy Reader Awards	Best Newcomer	Second	
2016	Inside Soap Awards	Best Partnership (shared with Reid)	Nominated	
