= Stella Crawford =

Fictional character from EastEnders

- EastEnders character
- Portrayed by: Sophie Thompson
- Duration: 2006–2007
- First appearance: Episode 3218; 7 September 2006
- Last appearance: Episode 3404; 23 July 2007
- Created by: Brigie de Courcy
- Introduced by: Kate Harwood
In-universe information
- Occupation: Lawyer
- Father: Edward Crawford
- Mother: Marion Crawford
- Sisters: Catherine Crawford

Stella Crawford is a fictional character from the BBC soap opera EastEnders, played by Sophie Thompson from 7 September 2006 to 23 July 2007. The character's story arc revolves on her relationship with established character Phil Mitchell (Steve McFadden), during which she mentally and physically abuses his young son Ben Mitchell (Charlie Jones) for several months in the build-up to her and Phil’s wedding. On the day of the wedding, Ben's ordeal is finally discovered, causing Stella to flee, with Phil giving chase, determined to make her pay for what she has done to his son; this culminates in Stella being killed off when she takes her own life by jumping off a roof to her death.

== Creation and development ==
"Part of Stella believes that once she's down the aisle with the ring on her finger, everything will be alright. That happens in real life, doesn't it? You think that if you get to a certain point, everything that'd happened will be forgotten or swept away. But everything catches up with you, just like it does with Stella…"

— Sophie Thompson explains Stella's motives

In July 2007, the entertainment website Digital Spy interviewed Sophie Thompson about the basics of her character Stella. She revealed that even though her character is a very nasty piece of work, nobody has shouted any comments to her on the street. She commented: "I've been pleasantly surprised. Occasionally you get the odd kid laughing and pointing but it's not been unpleasant at all. I've been amazed by the amount of post you get up at Elstree and how thoughtful the correspondence is. It's really nice to read a letter and see how people become engaged and involved in the storylines and want to have a good yarn about them!"

Stella was created solely as a love interest for the character Phil Mitchell. When Steve McFadden, who plays Phil, returned to the show in October 2005, a story conference was held between the show's producers, who decided that his relationship with his son Ben would take priority over any new love interests. Another story conference was held in February 2006, where it was decided to introduce a new love interest. EastEnders series story producer Brigie de Courcy said; "To create her, we took all of Phil's past lovers and came up with somebody completely different from them!"

Producers created a "wish list" of actresses they wanted to see. The EastEnders casting director offered the role to Sophie Thompson, who accepted. Producers were so excited that the whole office cheered when they found out that Thompson had accepted the role. Thompson said of the role that "joining EastEnders is a bit like being welcomed into a really special playground that you never thought you had the chance to play in, and you are rather in awe of all the kids, but very excited."

=== Personality ===
When she was first introduced, Stella appeared to be a scatter-brained but well-meaning character who lived on her own and had developed something of a drink problem when Phil first met her. She dryly comments on this, saying "You're getting a basic picture of a spinster here, aren't you? You're probably wondering if I've got any cats." However, as the show went on and her relationship with Phil's son, Ben, was explored, it became clear that Stella was a deranged and mentally unstable character, who psychologically and physically abused Ben, whilst manipulating him in her attempts to improve her relationship with his father. Supposedly, Stella's instability was a result of parental neglect. This was hinted at by her telling Ben that his friend Abi Branning was an unpleasant and untrustworthy person, probably as a result of poor parenting. Later in the same episode, she picks up a Mother's Day picture that she made with Ben and glares at the word "Mother", before later tearing up the card. It is known that something unpleasant happened to Stella's sister, for which Stella's parents blamed her; Stella told her mother that it was an accident. However, it was never revealed what happened to her or how, or whether it was Stella's fault. This was later confirmed to be true, when she told Phil that as a child she was ignored by her parents and felt like a ghost within her own home.

Stella at times gives the impression of being emotionally immature, a frequent side-effect of parental neglect. An interview with Sophie Thompson says that Charlie Jones, who plays Ben, mused that her vicious nature is caused by the fact that she had a very unhappy childhood.

== Storylines ==
Stella Crawford is a lawyer who soon ends up working for Phil Mitchell (Steve McFadden), the local hardman of Albert Square. They begin dating, but Phil's son Ben (Charlie Jones) is unhappy about it. Stella moves in with them and Ben tries breaking up the couple. Stella tricks Ben into trusting her, and attempts to end his friendship with classmate Abi Branning (Lorna Fitzgerald). After some time, Stella begins physically and mentally abusing Ben. She later forces Ben to get Phil to propose to her, and lies that she has taken a job in Manchester. Phil proposes and she accepts. She continues tormenting Ben by calling him names, pinching him and manipulating him to confess to things he has not done. She also convinces him that he caused a car accident that he and Phil were involved in. Ben then goes to football camp during the school holidays, upsetting Stella. Ben returns; Stella creeps into his room and tells him she loves him, knowing Phil is listening outside. This cements Phil's feelings towards her, and he is determined to marry for Ben. Ben tells Abi what is happening, but he believes it is a normal part of growing up that will happen to her too. The pair try to run away from home, but Stella stops them. She smashes a photo of Ben's deceased mother Kathy Beale (Gillian Taylforth), and says he is too pathetic to be Phil's real son. Abi later realises what Stella is doing and stands up to Stella.

On the day of Phil and Stella's wedding day, Ben tells Stella he does not want her to be his mother; Stella threatens Ben, warning him to keep quiet. During the ceremony, Ben reveals what Stella has been doing to him. Stella runs home, spills orange juice on Ben's bed and takes a picture of Phil and Ben, tearing Phil out and keeping the piece with Ben tucked inside her bra. Ben's half-brother, Ian Beale (Adam Woodyatt), sees Stella in shock; she lies to Ian by claiming that she has discovered something about Phil. Moments later, Phil bursts into The Queen Vic and Ian tells Stella to go. She takes the car again, and Phil follows her to an abandoned factory, where she locks the gates so that Phil cannot get to her. Stella says that in her childhood, she was always blamed for her sister's death. She felt like she was a ghost in her own home, and she feels the same with Phil; when she feels like she is in a dream, she sometimes has to pinch herself to wake herself up. Phil, reasoning that Stella is insane, drives his car into the gates and runs after her onto the roof. She threatens to jump off unless Phil says he loves her. Phil answers that he chose her because he thought she was "easy", "safe", and would "look after Ben, iron [his] shirts and keep [her] mouth shut for the next 30 years". Stella looks down from the roof and then jumps, killing herself instantly. Phil publicly declares that he killed her at The Queen Vic and is arrested for murder, but CCTV shows that she jumped.

In January 2012, Denise Fox (Diane Parish) is led to believe that Phil had murdered her husband Kevin Wicks (Phil Daniels) in late December 2007. Denise later suspects that Phil pushed Stella to her death on their wedding day, but Phil denies her accusations and insists that Stella committed suicide. However, Denise goes to the police, telling them she believes that Phil murdered Stella. Ben (now played by Joshua Pascoe) goes to the police and tells police detective DCI Jill Marsden (Sophie Stanton), who has been trying to imprison Phil for years, that Phil forced Stella to jump, telling her that if she did not, then he would push her. Phil is arrested for Stella's murder and is later charged, but Marsden is forced to release him when Ian reveals to her that Ben had lied about Phil murdering Stella.

== Reception ==
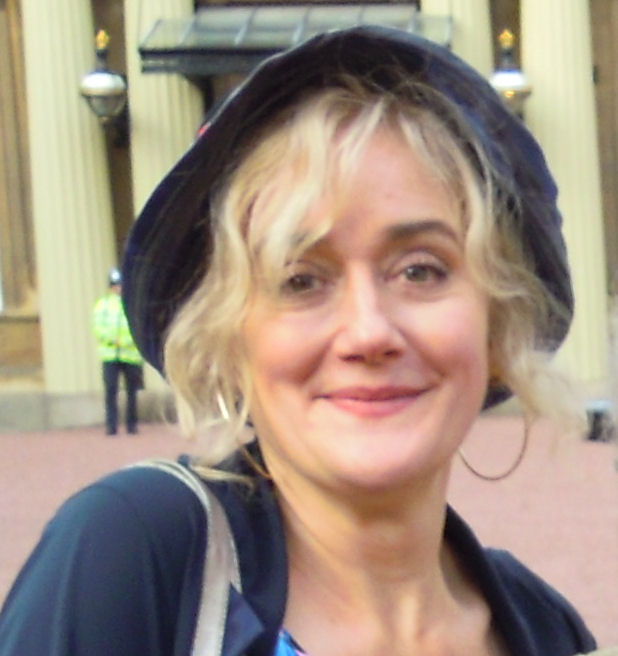
Sophie Thompson (pictured) won two awards in her short time on the soap.

For her role as Stella, Thompson won "Best Bitch" at the 2007 Inside Soap Awards, whilst Stella's torment of Ben won "Best Storyline". Radio Times included Stella in their feature on bunny boilers. They stated that anyone who falls in love with Phil needs "their head examined". They added that she was manipulative and "proved to be a basket-case". In 2008, All About Soap included Stella and Ben's child abuse plot in their list of "top ten taboo" storylines of all time. Their writer described it as one of the "taboos which have bravely been broken by soaps." In February 2025, Radio Times ranked Stella as the 7th best EastEnders villain, with Laura Denby writing that although she initially seemed like a "meek choice" for Phil, Thompson's "strong stint proved that a soap villain doesn't have to be the loudest person in the room".

== See also ==
- List of soap opera villains
