= Harry Reid (actor) =

English actor (b. 1992)

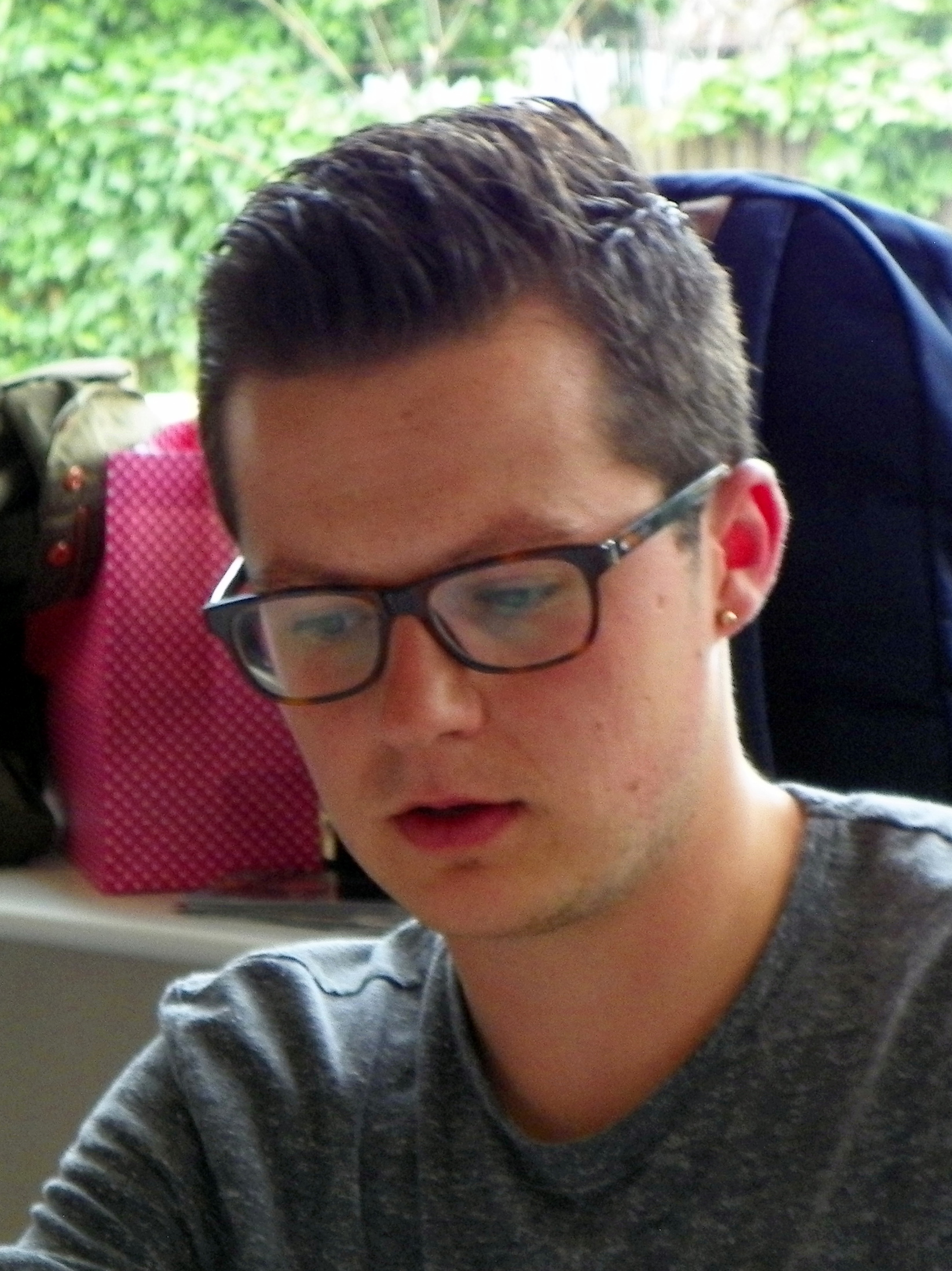
- Reid in 2016
- Born: 22 June 1992 (age 34); Gravesend, Kent, England
- Occupation: Actor
- Years active: 2013–present
- Television: EastEnders (2014–2018)

Harry Reid (born 22 June 1992) is an English actor. He is known for his role as Ben Mitchell in the BBC soap opera EastEnders, from 2014 until 2018.

== Career ==
Reid trained in acting, physical theatre and musical theatre at Miskin Theatre in Dartford from 2008, until 2010. He performed in several stage shows including Wind in the Willows, The Resistible Rise of Arturo Ui and Agamemnon. Reid then underwent a three-year BA (Hons) Acting degree at The Arts University Bournemouth between 2010 and 2013.

In early 2014, Reid appeared as Tom in a short film, The Last Waltz, for Canterbury Christ Church. He later appeared as Ricky in a feature film, K-Shop, for White Lantern Films.

On 18 July 2014, it was announced that Reid had been cast in the role of Ben Mitchell in the BBC soap opera EastEnders. He became the fifth actor to portray the character, replacing Joshua Pascoe. Reid expressed his excitement at joining the cast and portraying Ben, stating that Ben has such a rich backstory and is "so renowned". He added that he looked forward to working with actor Steve McFadden, who portrays Ben's father Phil Mitchell. EastEnders is Reid's first major role since leaving university. On 2 October 2017, it was announced that Reid would be leaving the soap after producers decided to write out the character. He confirmed that he would finish filming in December 2017. Reid made his final appearance on 12 January 2018.

Reid told Daniel Kilkelly of entertainment website Digital Spy that he had received offers after leaving EastEnders and that he would be attending auditions. On 23 February 2018, Reid announced that he would join the stage production of Witness for the Prosecution, portraying the character Leonard Vole. On the role, Reid commented, "It's a very interesting part to play, and the story keeps you guessing until the end." In October 2019, he appeared in the fifth series of the E4 reality series Celebrity Coach Trip. In December 2023, Reid portrayed Leonardo Sampson in an episode of the BBC soap opera Doctors.

== Filmography ==
Year	Title	Role	Notes
2013	Police Stopping Crimes	Multiple roles	Short film
2014	The Last Waltz	Young Tom	Short film
2014–2018	EastEnders	Ben Mitchell	Series regular 372 Episodes
2016	K-Shop	Ricky	Feature film
2019	Celebrity Coach Trip	Himself	Series 5
2023	Doctors	Leonardo Sampson	Episode: "It's the End of the Year (As We Know It) and We Feel Fine"
TBA	Die Before You Die	TBA	Currently in post-production

== Stage credits ==
Year	Title	Role	Venue
2018	Witness for the Prosecution	Leonard Vole	County Hall, London

== Awards and nominations ==
Year	Award	Category	Result	Ref.
2015	TV Choice Awards	Best Soap Newcomer	Nominated	
2015	Inside Soap Awards	Best Affair (shared with Jonny Labey)	Nominated	
2016	Inside Soap Awards	Best Partnership (shared with Labey)	Nominated	
2017	22nd National Television Awards	Serial Drama Performance	Nominated	
