= Sophie Thompson =

British actress (born 1962)

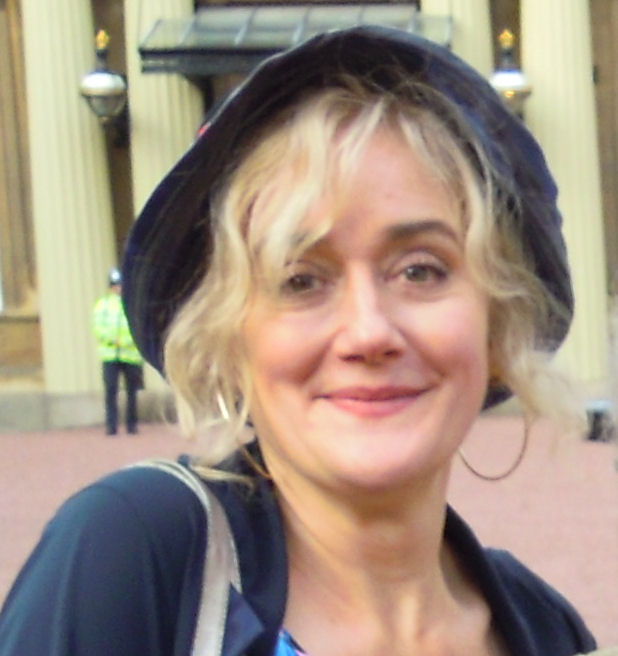
- Thompson in 2014
- Born: 20 January 1962 (age 64); Hampstead, London, England
- Education: Bristol Old Vic Theatre School
- Occupation: Actress
- Years active: 1977–present
- Spouse: Richard Lumsden (m. 1995; sep. 2015)
- Children: 2
- Parents: Eric Thompson (father); Phyllida Law (mother)
- Relatives: Emma Thompson (sister)
- Thompson's voice recorded 2012, as part of an audio description of the Golden Jubilee Bridges, London, for VocalEyes

Sophie Thompson (born 20 January 1962) is an English actress. She has worked in film, television and theatre and she won the 1999 Olivier Award for Best Actress in a Musical for the London revival of Into the Woods. She has been nominated for Olivier Awards six other times: for Wildest Dreams (1994), Company (1996), Clybourne Park (2011), Guys and Dolls (2016), Present Laughter (2020), and When We Are Married (2026).

Thompson's film appearances include Four Weddings and a Funeral (1994), Persuasion (1995), Emma (1996), Dancing at Lughnasa (1998), Gosford Park (2001) and Harry Potter and the Deathly Hallows – Part 1 (2010). Her television roles include playing Stella Crawford in the BBC soap opera EastEnders (2006–2007) and Rosemary Piper in the ITV soap opera Coronation Street (2018).

== Life and work ==
=== Early life, training and early career ===
Thompson was born on 20 January 1962 in West Hampstead, London, and grew up there. She is the daughter of actress Phyllida Law, and actor Eric Thompson. She is the younger sister of actress and screenwriter Emma Thompson.

She made her television debut at the age of 15, starring in the BBC adaptation of the Alison Uttley classic A Traveller in Time, opposite Simon Gipps-Kent, before going on to study at the Bristol Old Vic Theatre School.

In 1979, Thompson made her professional theatre debut at the age of 17 in the play The Schoolmistress by Arthur Wing Pinero at the Royal Exchange in Manchester.

=== Film ===
Big-screen roles include Four Weddings and a Funeral, Eat Pray Love, Emma,Dancing at Lughnasa, Gosford Park, Fat Slags, Relative Values and Morris: A Life with Bells On. In 2010, Thompson appeared in the first part of Harry Potter and the Deathly Hallows.

=== Television ===
Thompson starred alongside British comedians Alan Davies, in Jonathan Creek, and Lee Evans in So What Now? She also played Agatha opposite Jeremy Brett in the feature-length episode of The Case-Book of Sherlock Holmes titled The Master Blackmailer (1992). Other television appearances include Persuasion, Midsomer Murders, A Harlot's Progress, and the TV movie Magnolia. She played Miss Bartlett in Andrew Davies' 2007 adaptation of E.M. Forster's A Room with a View and also appeared in the last episode of series 4 of Doc Martin.

Thompson played the role of child abuser Stella Crawford in the BBC One soap opera EastEnders. She came into the show as Phil Mitchell's lawyer and they gradually developed a romantic link. Stella later became jealous of Phil's relationship with his son Ben and began to emotionally and physically abuse him, becoming one of soap's most-hated villains. Thompson left EastEnders on 20 July 2007, after the exposure of Stella's evil ways on her wedding day led to the character's suicide. She won the Inside Soap Best Bitch award for her portrayal of Stella.

In 2009, Thompson appeared in the BBC One comedy series Big Top. During 2012, Thompson appeared in Love Life and Lightfields, both of which were aired on ITV. In the same year she also appeared in a Keaton Henson's music video for "You Don't Know How Lucky You Are". Her recent television credits include Detectorists, Professor Branestawm, A Gert Lush Christmas, Jericho, Coronation Street (2018) and Inside No. 9.

Thompson was the winner of Celebrity MasterChef in 2014, beating Jodie Kidd and Charley Boorman in the final.

=== Theatre ===
She played Ophelia in the Renaissance Theatre Company production of Hamlet in 1988 in Birmingham, later touring England with the production. Directed by Sir Derek Jacobi, it starred her future brother-in-law Kenneth Branagh as Hamlet, Richard Easton as Claudius and Dearbhla Molloy as Gertrude. A film documentary, Discovering Hamlet, detailing the process of producing and rehearsing the play was released in 1990. A DVD version was released in 2010.

In 1996, Thompson appeared as Amy in Sam Mendes' acclaimed Donmar Warehouse revival of Company, receiving an Olivier Award nomination for her performance. Her performance of the Baker's Wife in the Donmar's revival of Into the Woods garnered her the 1999 Olivier Award for Best Actress in a Musical.

She played Kathy/Bev in Dominic Cooke's 2011 production of Clybourne Park at The Royal Court, which transferred to The Wyndhams. Thompson received an Olivier nomination for Best Actress.

Thompson's recent theatre credits include the role of Mrs Hardcastle in She Stoops To Conquer at the National Theatre, directed by Jamie Lloyd, and also the part of Doctor Mathilde von Zahnd in Josie Rourke's production of The Physicists at the Donmar.

=== Writing ===
In 2015, Thompson's recipe book, My Family Kitchen, was published, and her first children's book, Zoo Boy, was published in 2016.

== Personal life ==
In 1995, Thompson married actor Richard Lumsden; the couple separated in 2015 and are "happily divorced." They have two sons, born in 1997 and in 2000.

Thompson has been an active charity ambassador over the years for Dan's Fund For Burns. She also ran the 2010 Marathon for CINI, a charity supporting vulnerable families in India, and 24th Tottenham, a London-based group for children and young adults with special needs. She is also a patron of the charity Firefly International.

== Acting credits ==
=== Film ===
Year	Title	Role	Notes
1982	The Missionary	Mission Girl	
1991	Twenty-One	Francesca	
1994	Four Weddings and a Funeral	Lydia, the Bride – Wedding Two	
1995	Persuasion	Mary Musgrove	
1996	Emma	Miss Bates	
1998	Dancing at Lughnasa	Rose Mundy	
2000	Relative Values	Dora Moxton	
2001	Gosford Park	Dorothy	
2002	Nicholas Nickleby	Miss Lacreevy	
2004	Fat Slags	Tracey	
2009	Morris: A Life with Bells On	Glenda	
2010	Eat Pray Love	Corella	
2010	Harry Potter and the Deathly Hallows – Part 1	Mafalda Hopkirk	
2011	Monte Carlo	Auction Bidder 2	
2014	That Day We Sang	Dorothy	
2014	Mohammed	Emily	Short film
2015	Viking	Cathy	Short film
2019	A Disappearance	Dame Alvera	Short film
2019	Tales from the Lodge	Emma	
2019	Present Laughter	Monica Reed	
2024	Time Travel Is Dangerous	Valerie	
2026	Greenland 2: Migration	Mackenzie Matthews	

=== Television ===
- A Traveller in Time (1978) ... Penelope; 5 episodes
- Hammer House of Horror (1980) ... First Girl in "Guardian of the Abyss";
- Casualty (1987) ... Judy Wilson in "Cross Fingers"; 1 episode
- Boon (1991) ... Vicky 'Mouthpiece' in "Help Me Make It Through the Night"; 1 episode
- The Casebook of Sherlock Holmes (1992) ... Agatha in "The Master Blackmailer"
- Comedy Playhouse (1993) ... Val in "The Complete Guide to Relationships"
- Performance (1994) ... Gillian Player in "Message for Posterity"
- Nelson's Column (1994–1995) ... Clare Priddy
- Mr. Bean (1995) ... Girlfriend "Torvill and Bean"; 1 episode
- The Railway Children (2000) ... Mrs Perks
- So What Now? (2001) ... Heather
- Jonathan Creek (2003) ... Dorothy Moon in "Angel Hair"; 1 episode
- The Young Visiters (2003) ... Bessie Topp
- Midsomer Murders (2006) ... April Gooding in "Dead Letters"; 1 episode
- Magnolia (2006) ... Marjorie Forsyth
- A Harlot's Progress (2006) ... Jane Hogarth
- Doctors (2006) ... Rachel Barton in "Rabbitgate"; 1 episode
- EastEnders (2006–2007) ... Stella Crawford
- A Room with a View (2007) ... Charlotte Bartlett
- Big Top (2009) ... Aunty Helen
- May Contain Nuts (2009) ... Sarah McDonald
- Doc Martin (2009) ... Tasha
- Agatha Christie's Poirot (2010) ... Mrs Reynolds in "Hallowe’en Party"
- Whistle and I'll Come to You (2010) ... Carol, the hotel proprietor
- Love Life (2012) ... Penny
- Lightfields (2013) ... Lorna
- Death in Paradise (2014) ... Angela ; 1 episode
- Inside No. 9 (2014) ... Jan in "Last Gasp"
- Detectorists (2014–2015, 2017, 2022) ... Sheila
- Celebrity MasterChef (2014) ... Herself/series winner
- The Incredible Adventures of Professor Branestawm (2014) ... Aggie
- Harry Hill in Professor Branestawm Returns (2015) ... Aggie
- A Gert Lush Christmas (2015) ... Sue Colman
- Bounty Hunters (2017) ... Fiona
- Ratburger (2017) ... Miss Maxwell
- Coronation Street (2018) ... Rosemary Piper, recurring role
- Ghosts (2019 TV series) (2019) ... Bunny Beg-Chetwynde
- Sandylands (2020) ... Jeannie Swallows
- Feel Good (2020) ... Maggie
- Sex Education (2021) ... Carol Iglehart
- The Flatshare (2022) ... Katherine
- Silo (2023) ... Gloria Hildebrandt
- Sisters (2023) ... Sheryl

=== Theatre ===
- Hamlet ... Ophelia; Renaissance Theatre Company; 1988
- As You Like It ... Rosalind; Royal Shakespeare Company; 1989–1990
- All's Well That Ends Well ... Helena; Royal Shakespeare Company; 1992–1993
- Wildest Dreams ... Royal Shakespeare Company; 1993–1994 (Olivier nomination)
- Company ... Amy; Donmar/Albery; 1996 (Olivier nomination)
- Into the Woods ... The Baker's Wife; Donmar; 1998–1999 (Olivier Award)
- Measure For Measure ... Isabella; Globe Theatre, London; 2004
- Female of the Species ... London; 2008 (Theatre goers choice award)
- Clybourne Park ... Bev/Kathy; Royal Court Theatre, London; 2010 (Olivier Nomination, Evening Standard nomination)
- She Stoops to Conquer ... Mrs Hardcastle; National Theatre, London; 2012
- Guys and Dolls ... Miss Adelaide; Chichester Festival Theatre, Tour and Savoy Theatre, London; 2015–2016 (Olivier nomination)
- The Importance of Being Earnest ... Lady Bracknell; Vaudeville Theatre, London; 2018
- Present Laughter ... Monica Reed; The Old Vic, London; 2019 (Olivier nomination)
