= Episode 4778 =

2014 episode of EastEnders

- EastEnders episode
- The scene where Johnny (Sam Strike) comes out to his father Mick Carter (Danny Dyer)
- Episode no.: Episode 4778
- Directed by: Rebecca Gatward
- Written by: Daran Little
- Original air date: 3 January 2014
- Running time: 28 minutes

Guest appearance
- Rachael Chisholm as Sonographer

Episode chronology
← Previous; Episode 4777	Next → Episode 4779

Episode 4778 of the BBC soap opera EastEnders aired on 3 January 2014. It was originally broadcast on BBC One at 8:00pm. The episode was written by Daran Little and directed by Rebecca Gatward.

The episode follows the events of the previous episode where Nancy Carter (Maddy Hill) outed her brother Johnny Carter (Sam Strike) as gay to their parents Linda (Kellie Bright) and Mick Carter (Danny Dyer). Nancy backtracks and says that she is lying, but Johnny later comes out to Mick, who consoles and accepts him. The episode ends with Linda crying after having heard the conversation between Mick and Johnny. Other storylines in the episode include pregnant Kat Slater (Jessie Wallace) and Alfie Moon (Shane Richie) go to hospital after Kat has an accident, where they find out that Kat's pregnancy is fine and that they are expecting twins. The episode also sees Lucy (Hetti Bywater) and Peter Beale (Ben Hardy) worry about their father Ian Beale (Adam Woodyatt), which leads to Peter calling someone to help; this facilitated the surprise return of Jane Beale (Laurie Brett) in the soap's following episode.

Johnny's coming out scene was well received by viewers and critics. Strike and Dyer both received praise for their performances and they both received letters from men saying that the episode encouraged them to come out. Critics have placed the scene as one of EastEnders' best moments and some viewers attributed the episode for putting EastEnders back on track. EastEnders executive producer Dominic Treadwell-Collins hoped that the scene would not only help LGBTQ+ viewers but also encourage fathers to react similarly to how Mick did. The scene won EastEnders "Media Recognition Award" at the 2014 Attitude Awards and was also nominated for other awards. Additionally, the surprise reveal of Kat and Alfie expecting twins was well-received by viewers and critics.

== Plot ==
Following an argument, Linda (Kellie Bright) and Mick Carter (Danny Dyer) are shocked by their daughter Nancy Carter's (Maddy Hill) revelation that her brother Johnny Carter (Sam Strike) is gay. After being pushed by Johnny, Nancy reluctantly claims that she was lying. At the Queen Vic pub, Johnny flirts with Whitney Dean (Shona McGarty), but when she invites him to her house alone he makes an excuse to not come. Danny Pennant (Gary Lucy), who Johnny had kissed days prior, winds Johnny up. Dexter Hartman (Khali Best) is taking care of his injury after being punched by Nancy earlier when she assumed that he touched her bum. Alfie Moon (Shane Richie) arrives home to find his pregnant partner Kat Slater (Jessie Wallace) having fallen on the floor and he gets Terry Spraggan (Terry Alderton) to drive them to the hospital.

At the hospital, Terry and Alfie have a heartfelt conversation. Alfie says that he believed he could not have children and that he does not want Kat to have to worry about anything. At the hospital, Kat is told that things will be fine but is told to have a scan to be safe, making her worried. Nancy apologises to Johnny for outing him. Johnny tells Nancy that he thinks he cannot tell his parents that he is gay and believes that Mick will not take it well, but Nancy believes that he should be honest about his sexuality as she wants him to be happy.

When a worried Lucy (Hetti Bywater) and Peter Beale (Ben Hardy) find their father Ian Beale (Adam Woodyatt) on a bench after initially not being able to find him, Ian reflects on his life, saying that he feels that everyone bosses him around and that he cannot get anything right. He also tells Peter that he cannot stop him seeing Lola Pearce (Danielle Harold). Kat and Alfie are told that the pregnancy is fine and they find out that they are having twins, which shocks them. Linda apologises to Nancy for shouting at her and jumping to conclusions. Linda admits that she feels like she is losing Nancy and also tells her that she wants Nancy to find long-lasting love. Shirley Carter (Linda Henry) tells Johnny that she saw him kissing Danny and tells him that he should tell his parents about his sexuality, saying that they may not like it but they will eventually accept it. Shirley tells Johnny about a boy that she was close with who did something bad to prove to people that he was not gay. During a conversation, Linda tells Mick that Johnny is not gay and refuses to accept the possibility that he might be.

Peter calls an unknown person and says that he is worried about Ian and requests their help. Mick goes to Johnny and the pair talk, where Mick tells his son that it would be okay if he was gay, and adds that he knows that being gay is not a choice. Mick notes that he has noticed signs and saw Johnny's face when Nancy said he was gay and tells Johnny that he can tell him anything. Johnny begins crying and breaks down in Mick's arms; he tells his father that he is gay and believes that it is unnatural and wrong. Mick comforts him and reassures his son that he is proud of him and that it is okay. As Johnny continues crying to his father, Linda is seen crying outside the room, having heard the conversation.

== Production ==
Episode 4778 of EastEnders aired on 3 January 2014 at 8:00pm on BBC One. The episode was written by Daran Little. Spoilers released ahead of the episode showed that Johnny Carter (Sam Strike) would reveal his secret when he breaks down and admits to his father Mick Carter (Danny Dyer) that he has been hiding the fact that he is gay for years. Spoiler pictures showed that Mick would be supportive towards Johnny. A writer from BBC One noted that prior to coming out, Mick and Linda Carter (Kellie Bright) were unaware that Johnny has kissed Danny Pennant (Gary Lucy) and had been happy when Johnny appeared to have caught the eye of Whitney Dean (Shona McGarty). The writer also teased that whilst Mick was supportive of Johnny, it was not yet revealed how Linda would respond to her son coming out as gay. The episode ends with Linda sobbing outside the room after hearing Johnny come out to his father. Strike believed that Linda "blames" herself for Johnny's sexuality and Strike believed that there would a long-running issue between Linda and her son over his sexuality. Johnny and his immediate family had only debuted on EastEnders in Christmas 2013.

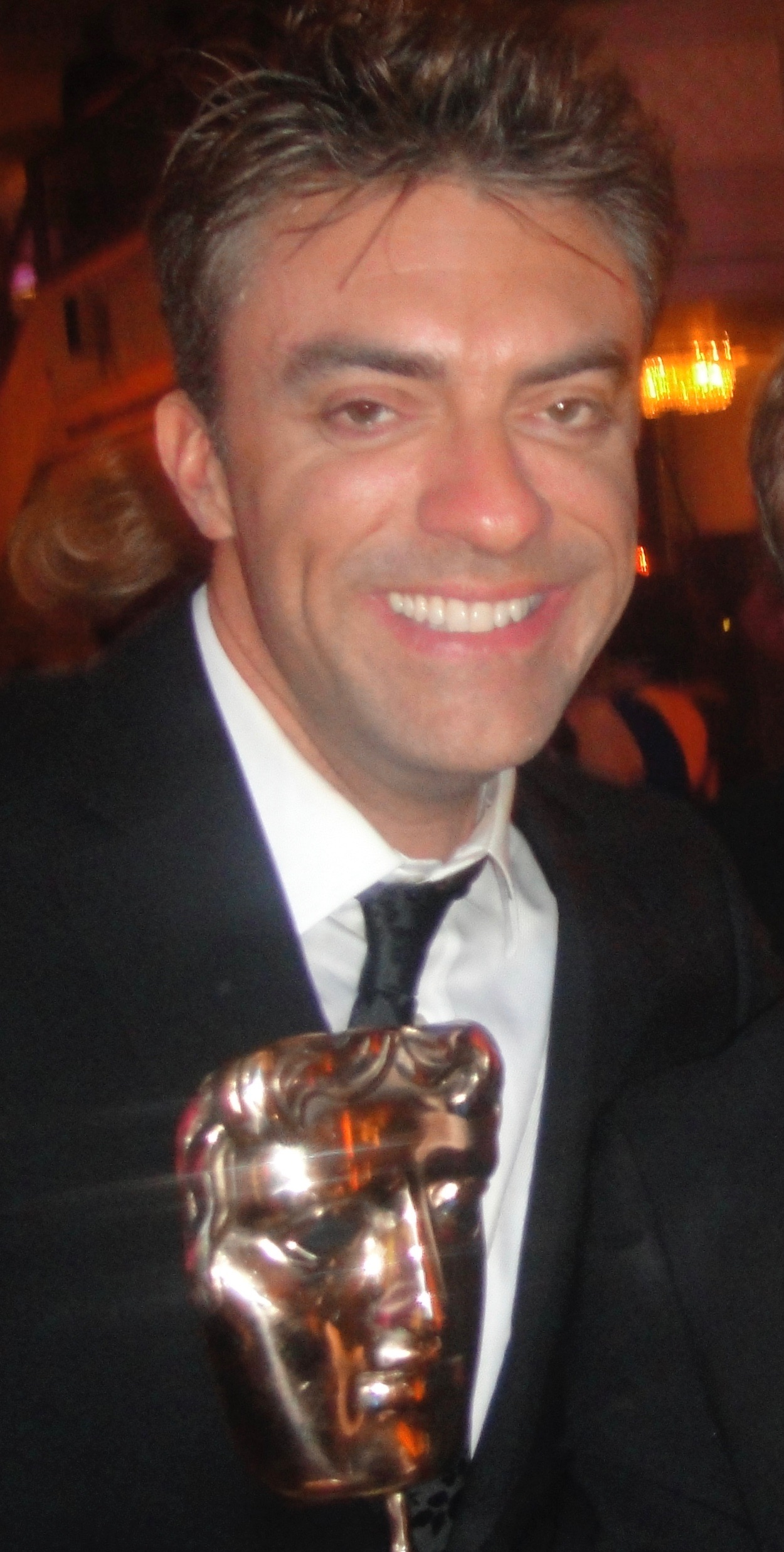
Daran Little wrote the episode

EastEnders executive producer Dominic Treadwell-Collins said that he had a "kindness agenda" and wanted to make the soap inclusive. The producer believed that Johnny coming out would help LGBTQ+ boys, similarly to how gay EastEnders characters Colin Russell (Michael Cashman) and Barry Clark (Gary Hailes) had done years prior. However, Treadwell-Collins also said that the scene was also for fathers watching the soap, noting that Mick "put his arm around his son and said, 'I love you, you're my boy, I don't care'... for men like Danny Dyer, who hold Danny Dyer up on a pedestal, thinking, 'If he did it, so can I'". The producer also noted that some older viewers would still complain about LGBTQ+ storylines on the soap. EastEnders had previously explored a gay teenager coming out to their father through the character of Ben Mitchell (Joshua Pascoe), which had a different outcome.

Johnny's coming out storyline had begun on 30 December 2013, when Johnny kissed Danny. This was also defended by the BBC, who released a statement saying, "EastEnders aims to reflect real life, and this means including and telling stories about characters from many different backgrounds, faiths, religions and sexualities". The episode before Episode 4778 had seen Johnny's sister Nancy Carter (Maddy Hill) reveal that Johnny was gay during a row and Episode 4778 begins with Nancy "frantically" try to backtrack and she claims that he is lying. Danny and Johnny's kiss had received some complaints from viewers, but this was defended by Lucy and writers Pete Lawson and Daran Little.

Strike said that he felt comfortable doing the "heavy scene" with Dyer in Episode 4778 as he believed they were at the same level and he called Dyer a "really lovely guy". Strike said that he was nervous about the scene where Johnny comes out on the night that it aired as he wanted it to be convincing and he wanted to do it "justice" by the people who had gone through the experience. Strike added, "It was a real proving ground for me, because it was the first time I actually had to do any proper drama acting". Dyer was happy that the soap chose to have Mick be accepting of Johnny's sexuality rather than reacting negatively, with Dyer explaining, "They spun it on the head for me, because obviously my perception and what people think I'm about – that I was going to react badly – and instead I just cuddled [Johnny] and said, 'Listen, it's fine, I love you, no problem'". Dyer also felt very proud to be part of the coming out scene.

Other spoilers revealed that Episode 4778 would feature the aftermath of pregnant Kat Slater's (Jessie Wallace) fall, which leads to her partner Alfie Moon (Shane Richie) rushing Kat to hospital to make sure that everything is okay. Kat is fearful for her child, but Kat and Alfie end up receiving "surprising news" when they find out that they are expecting twins. Whilst Kat's fall had been revealed in spoilers for the episode, the twin reveal was not announced beforehand in an attempt to keep it a surprise for viewers; EastEnders bosses had teased prior to the episode that they wanted to deliver more surprises to viewers throughout 2014. The episode also sees Peter Beale (Ben Hardy) call an unknown person to help his father Ian Beale (Adam Woodyatt); the mysterious person was later revealed to be Jane Beale (Laurie Brett), who made an unannounced return in the soap's following episode, broadcast on 6 January 2014.

== Reception ==
Strike revealed that he and Dyer had received letters saying that they had helped people come out, which Strike said "makes things worth it". Dyer said that he had received positive reactions for the episode, explaining, "I'm getting wave after wave of it. They're all saying they came out and it was the most liberating thing". Dyer also received letters from young gay men who had come out after seeing the episode, which Dyer called "a powerful thing" that he was "really proud to be associated with". Lucy also noted that a viewer had thanked him for the storyline as it gave him the courage to come out, with Lucy saying, "If you can do that, you as an actor and the show has done its job". The scene where Johnny comes out to Mick was shortlisted for Spectacular Scene of the Year at the 2014 British Soap Awards. The scene also won EastEnders "Media Recognition Award" at the 2014 Attitude Awards. Additionally, Linda's journey to accepting Johnny's sexuality was longlisted for "Best Storyline" at the 2014 Inside Soap Awards.

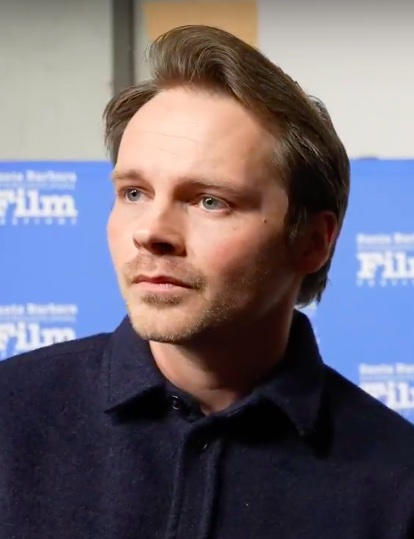
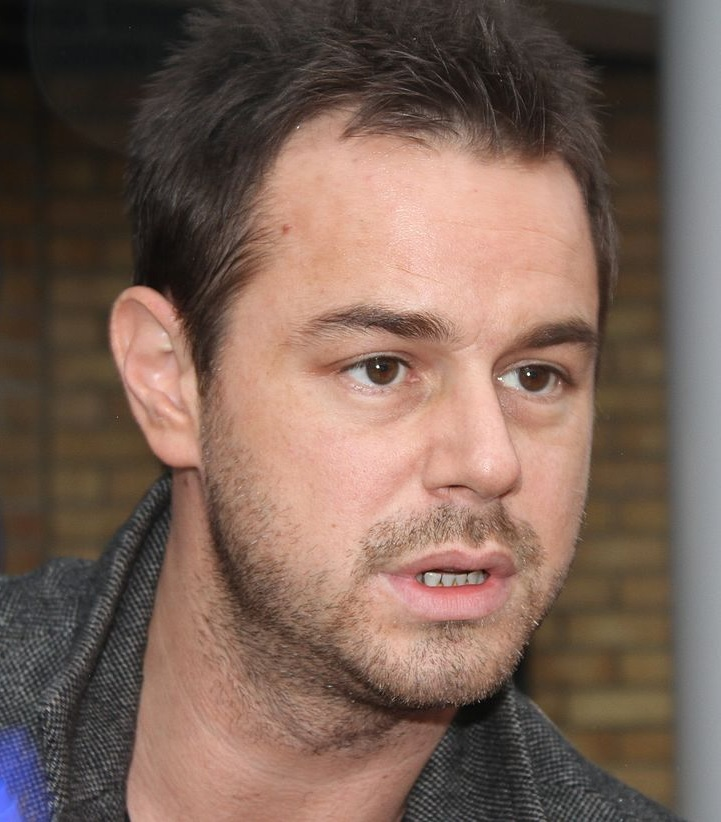
Sam Strike (left) and Danny Dyer (right) received letters from viewers saying that the episode had encouraged them to come out.

Daniel Kilkelly from Digital Spy and Claire Hodgson from the Daily Mirror called the scenes where Johnny comes out to his father "emotional". Hodgson opined that the Carter family were already delivering "dramatic" storylines despite only having arrived on the soap a week prior. Kilkelly reported that the episode was "well-received" by viewers, who praised Strike and Dyer for their "sensitive performances". Kilkelly called the reveal that Kat and Alfie were having twins surprising but "happy news".

Stephen Patterson from Metro believed that Johnny's coming out to Mick as one of EastEnders' best moments in its history, opining that the soap is "undoubtedly at its best when it deals with character-driven conflict and drama". Patterson called Johnny "emotional" when coming out and wrote, "It wasn't part of a big reveal, nor was it sensationalised for dramatic purposes, but rather it was nothing more than a beautifully written conversation between father and son — and it's this simplicity that aided in making it such a revolutionary moment not only for the Carters, but also for the soap". Patterson also included the episode on his list of EastEnders episodes to rewatch and called the coming out scene "beautifully penned", noting how Mick "wasted little time in telling his son just how proud he was of him". Patterson opined that the moment quickly "went down in EastEnders history" and praised the "superb dialogue courtesy of legendary soap writer Daran Little" and the "exceptional performances" from Strike and Dyer.

Victoria Garo-Falides from the Daily Mirror rated the week's episodes 3 out of 5 stars; she noted how whilst Mick was "hunky dory" about Johnny coming out, Linda had gotten her "squeaky leggings in a twist about it", and she also believed that the week of episodes showed how the Carters were "continuing their reign over The Vic". Garo-Falides highlighted the line where Mick says to Johnny "So you're the one we should have called Nancy", calling it a "decent gag". The writer criticised Peter's decision to call Jane, opining, "that's exactly what [Ian] needs. An ex wife poking her nose in". Garo-Falides also noted how Kat was now expecting "TWO bundles of screaming, uncontrollable Alfie-chromosomed joy". Kayleigh Dray from Closer Online wrote that Johnny's "touching 'coming out' storyline warmed the hearts of the nation, scoring Sam Strike and his on-screen dad Danny Dyer an awards nomination", and opined that this was the reason that viewers were "shocked" when Strike announced that he would be leaving EastEnders later in 2014. Will Stroude from Attitude called Johnny coming out to Mick one of 2014's "most heartwarming gay storylines".

A writer from Metro reported how viewers responded positively to the episode, with some opining on social media that the storyline put EastEnders back on track. The writer noted how the Carter family had made a big impact on viewers despite not having debuted long prior to the episode and reported how viewers gave the storyline a "resounding thumbs up", in addition how viewers also liked Mick's joke towards Johnny about having called him Nancy. The writer also reported how viewers were happy about Kat and Alfie having twins, which the writer called "good news" after it appeared that Kat could have lost the baby. Paul Flynn from The Guardian called Johnny's coming out scene "exceptionally moving"; Flynn recalled that "the hairs on the back of my neck stood upright" when Mick sweetly consoled Johnny about being gay and noted how the scene "echoed with the underexplored truth" that fathers sometimes find it easier than mothers of their children coming out. Flynn believed the scene felt "achieved the holy grail of soap opera" and felt real, and praised Strike and Dyer for delivering an "exceptional, impulsive, physical reading of the ties that bond" between a dad and his son. Flynn believed that the storyline was an "apology" for the "mess" that EastEnders made for their portrayal of Ben Mitchell's coming out storyline and believed that the episode was helping the soap recover and had made Dyer become a "a new little hero of our times".
