= Paul Coker (EastEnders) =

Character from the BBC soap opera EastEnders

- EastEnders character
- Portrayed by: Jonny Labey
- Duration: 2015–2016
- First appearance: Episode 5077; 1 June 2015
- Last appearance: Episode 5347; 8 September 2016
- Created by: Daran Little
- Introduced by: Dominic Treadwell-Collins
In-universe information
- Occupation: Hair stylist Market trader
- Father: Lawrie Coker
- Mother: Jenny Rawlinson
- Grandfathers: Les Coker
- Grandmothers: Pam Coker

Paul Coker is a character from the BBC soap opera EastEnders, played by Jonny Labey. He first appeared in episode 5077 of the show, originally broadcast in the United Kingdom on 1 June 2015. Paul, a gay character, is the grandson of established characters Les (Roger Sloman) and Pam Coker (Lin Blakley) and boyfriend of Ben Mitchell (Harry Reid). The character's final appearance is in Episode 5347, shown on 8 September 2016, following the character's death after an off-screen homophobic attack on 18 July 2016.

Kissing scenes between Paul and Ben received a mixed reaction from viewers, though the character has received positive comments from reviewers. Ofcom received 76 complaints from viewers when the couple were seen topless together in a funeral parlour with a corpse in the room, but decided not to investigate the complaints as the scenes were "justified in the context" and sexual contact was "implied". The relationship was longlisted at the Inside Soap Awards in the "Best Affair" category.

== Development ==
=== Casting and introduction ===
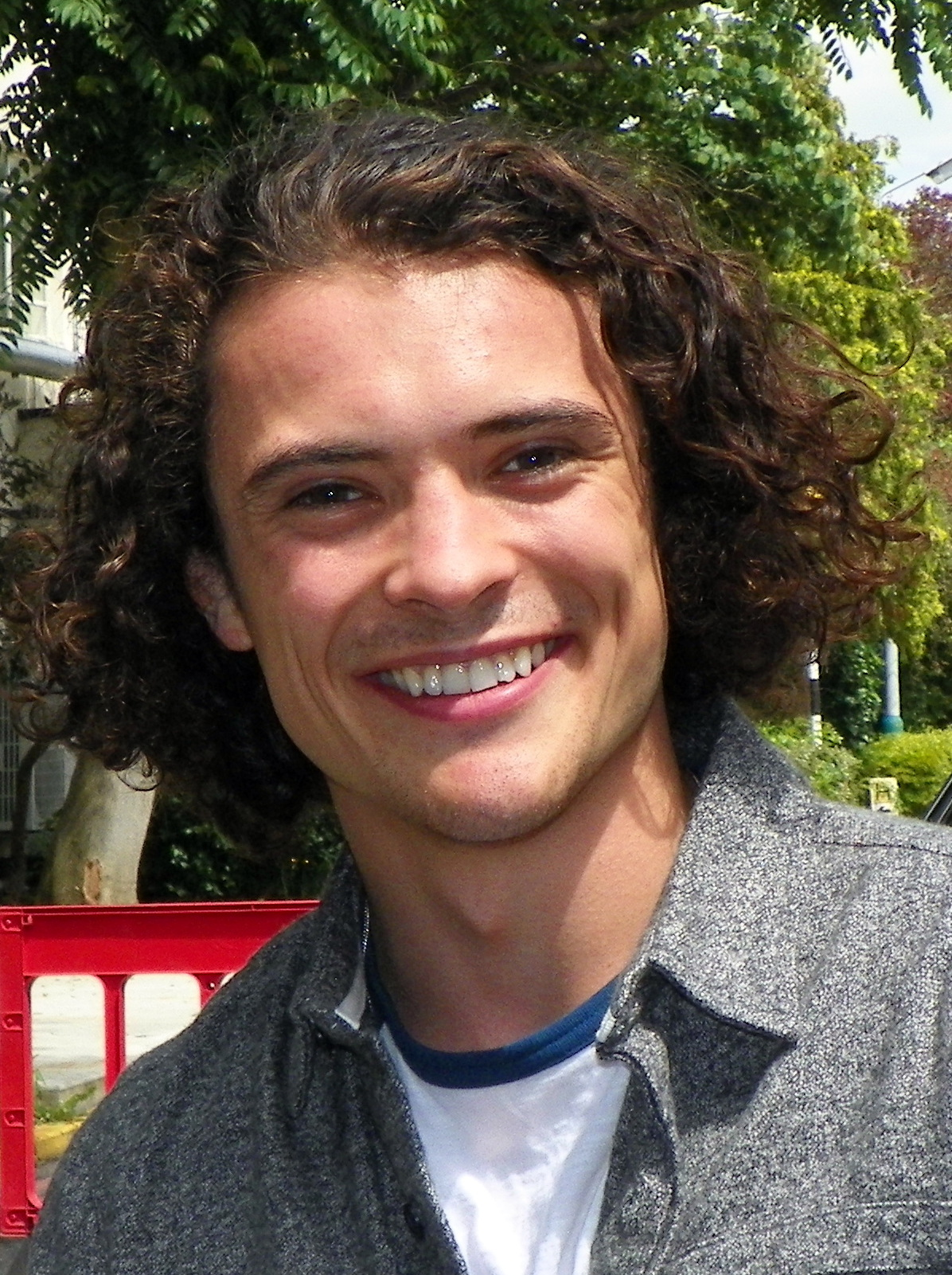
Jonny Labey (pictured) said he was "overjoyed" to play Paul.

The character was created by EastEnders writer Daran Little. Labey met Ben Mitchell actor Harry Reid during Labey's penultimate audition and said the two of them "hit it off" from the start. Labey said, "It was important for the creatives on the show to see some sort of chemistry between us from the start and see if we clicked. On a mental level, as well as a professional one on screen." Labey was at home when he found out he had been offered the role. He started filming for EastEnders on 17 March 2015. The character and casting were announced on 16 April 2015, when Labey said: "I am overjoyed to have been given the role of Paul Coker and am thrilled to be joining the show at such a prevalent time as it marks its 30th anniversary. I know I've got a lot of work to do to live up to the talent I shall be working with, but I have never felt more welcome and cannot wait to get started." Executive producer Dominic Treadwell-Collins said: "Jonny's a sensitive, clever and intuitive actor and has fitted in to his new Walford family with ease." Labey described his character's first two weeks on screen as "unbelievable", because he had "a topless scene, a crying scene, an argument and a kissing scene. It all went off!" EastEnders was Labey's first TV role, having appeared in theatre and one film prior to this.

=== Characterisation ===
Paul is described as fun, honest and always the centre of attention. He was described by Amy Duncan of the Metro as a "new heartthrob" for the show. It was said that he has a "natural confidence" and is comfortable with who he is. Labey said Paul is openly gay and called him a "troublemaker" who "causes mischief" but is "loveable" and puts on a "21st century persona". He also called him a "nice character" who "means well". Paul arrives in Walford having spent two years working as a club rep in Turkey, and Labey said that now he is in Walford, he is "all about partying, having a drink and flirting quite a bit", and is ready to meet new people. He also thought that Paul was a "happy-go-lucky" character. Labey also revealed that Paul is the kind of person who will start something but give up before finishing, and is someone who likes to gossip. Paul is also diabetic.

=== Storylines and relationships ===
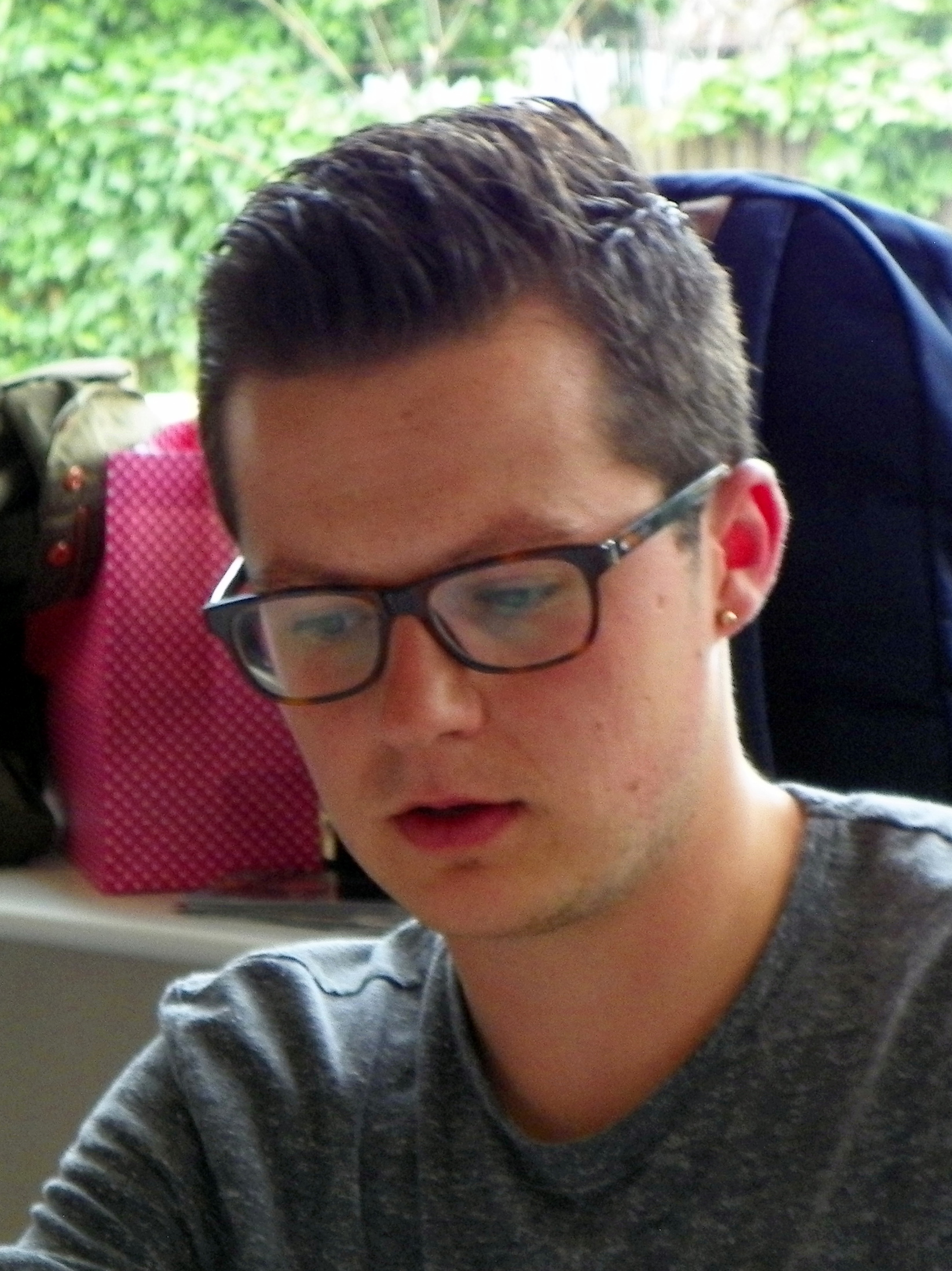
Paul became a love interest for Ben Mitchell (played by Harry Reid, pictured).

Treadwell-Collins revealed that Paul would cause trouble for his grandparents "as he uncovers some secrets from the past", and that he "sets one heart in particular racing." It was later revealed that he would be a potential love interest for established character Ben Mitchell. Labey said that Paul's usual type of men was "harder, bigger, muscly tattooed guys", but said that Ben has a "Mitchell persona", which excites Paul, and he enjoys the "tease of trying to get Ben to come out", because he has a girlfriend in Abi Branning (Lorna Fitzgerald). He also said that Paul is drawn to the fact that Ben has a girlfriend because "it's all part of the chase" and their relationship is "playful and mischievous", but said that Paul respects that Ben struggles with coming to terms with his sexuality. Harry Reid, who plays Ben, said that Paul is "an outlet for Ben's true feelings", and that "Paul is much softer than Ben". Labey said that "Paul is excited by Ben." Labey went on to explain that Paul and Ben's relationship starts off as flirting and "blossoms over the summer", but he hoped it would be a "slow burner" that would "work on different levels", instead of "Ben's desperation and [Paul] feeling fed up", saying he hoped they would learn to trust each other and Ben would feel safe and comfortable with Paul. He said that Paul's attraction to Ben changes over time: initially he is attracted to Ben's "bad-boy reputation" but then sees a "more fragile" side to him and they discover they have more in common. Ben and Paul's relationship was given the portmanteau "Baul" by Daniel Kilkelly of Digital Spy.

Labey said that Paul loves Pam, his grandmother, calling their relationship "beautiful". He called Paul a "nana's boy" who would cry to her while putting on a persona with everyone else, revealing that he never had to come out to her as gay. Paul favours Pam over Les and wants to protect her, especially when he discovers Les's supposed affair, though Labey said that Paul and Les once had a "lovely relationship". Labey also said that Paul's relationship with his grandparents can be "a bit difficult" because their son and Paul's father is dead and they want him to be a part of Les's funeral business. When Les and Pam's relationship breaks up, Labey said that Paul is "stuck between them both, trying to reason with one and convince the other", and they "need Paul there to remind them of how they were as a couple." Labey said Lola would be someone Paul confides in, as they have the same characteristics, though they would be in competition at work.

In July 2016, Paul's mother, Jenny Rawlinson, played by Amy Marston, was introduced.

=== Sexuality ===
Labey defended his character when someone asked him to object to sexuality-led storylines in soap, by saying "Paul [is] very outgoing and forward, so as a gay character, [kissing Ben]'s what he would've done! He can't dull things down because people aren't comfortable with it. That's just him." Labey was not fazed by having to kiss another man in the show, saying "a kiss is a kiss." On the storyline, Labey said, "We're not representing gay men in general, that's something we're certainly not doing. What we're representing is people that felt uncomfortable coming out to their parents. This is just the story of two gay men, and that story for us is that Ben is uncomfortable in coming out, and it's the reaction of people who're wanting him to come out." Labey added that, "It's such a huge topic and with everyone's story being different, there's an element of being proud to show these two characters' stories, and hopefully help others, when and if Ben finally makes the decision to come out. [...] [I] feel privileged to be trusted with that, with such a hugh audience watching." Labey hoped the storyline would make a change to a viewer's life.

=== Departure and death ===
On 19 April 2016, it was announced that Labey would leave his role after a year, a decision that was made "a while ago", and Paul's last episode would air "in a couple of months" in an "explosive" storyline. Labey said there was "still so much to happen for Paul", urging his fans not to "lose hope". Lin Blakley, who plays Paul's grandmother, Pam Coker, said that Paul's departure would be "awful", adding, "I am sure there will be a few gasps from the audience who'll think, 'My gosh, I didn't see that coming!'" Paul is killed off in the episode broadcast on 18 July 2016, which was called a "huge shock twist" by a Daily Telegraph reporter, as viewers were led to believe that Ben had died. Paul's last appearance was broadcast on 8 September 2016, as a corpse.

Following Paul's death, Labey stated he was "shocked" when he first heard the details of his exit, but said it was "beautifully written" and had a "great" build up, opining that "It's incredible to have a week dedicated to your character." He also said that he found it difficult to keep the storyline a secret.

== Storylines ==
Paul arrives in Walford after a holiday in Turkey, angers Ben Mitchell (Harry Reid) when he accidentally knocks over Lola Pearce (Danielle Harold) and then flirts with him. Paul sees his grandfather Les Coker (Roger Sloman) with Claudette Hubbard (Ellen Thomas), the woman with whom Paul believes Les is having an affair. Paul later meets Ben and realizes Ben is gay but is hiding his sexuality. He sneaks his phone number into Ben's pocket, and as Paul is about to leave again, Ben texts Paul so they meet. They share a passionate kiss and arrange to meet again, and Paul returns to Albert Square where Les and his grandmother, Pam Coker (Lin Blakley), see him. He refuses to stay with them, and later tells Les he knows about his affair, but Pam convinces him to stay. At Pam's birthday party, Paul tells Les he discovered the affair with Claudette before he left for Turkey and tells Les to end the affair or he will tell Pam about it. He then gets a job at Dean Wicks's (Matt Di Angelo) hair salon, Blades. Paul is in direct competition with Lola for a permanent role when Dean says he will decide based on a cut-and-colour. Pam promises to be Paul's model, but, in an attempt to get him to work for Les and his funeral parlour, she gets him to perform the hairdressing on a corpse. Instead, Paul invites Ben round. Although Paul is initially beaten to the role by Lola, it is because Pam put Dean off hiring him so he would work for the Cokers. Paul then learns that Les has visited Claudette, so he tells Claudette's son, Vincent Hubbard (Richard Blackwood) that Les and Claudette are having sex. Paul secures the job after Lola leaves, while Vincent discovers evidence of the affair. On confronting his mother, she resolves to deal with Paul. Claudette visits Paul at work and tells him he is mistaken.

At the 100th anniversary party of the Cokers' funeral director business, Paul sees Les with Claudette, despite Les telling Claudette not to go. Paul tells Pam that Les is having an affair, and she tries to confront Claudette, but loses her nerve and tells Paul not to mention it again, before later admitting that he is right. After finding Les's tie at Claudette's house and being given conflicting explanations from her and Les, Pam leaves to stay with her sister. Paul comforts Les, causing him to lose his job at Blades, and tries to contact Pam, asking her to come back to Walford. Paul collects Pam from her sister's house and finds Claudette and Les together back at home. Pam urges Les to end the affair or their marriage is over.

Paul tells Ben he wants a more serious relationship with him, but Ben declines, saying he wants to keep it casual, and that he does not want his girlfriend Abi Branning (Lorna Fitzgerald) to find out. After they are caught having sex in the car lot by Ben's father Phil Mitchell (Steve McFadden), Phil disappears and Ben blames his relationship with Paul so ends it. After Pam asks Paul to leave the house for a day so she can sort out her marriage troubles, he returns early and is shocked to find Les dressed in women's clothes. Pam leaves Walford again despite Paul's pleas and Paul comforts Les. Paul's attempts to reconcile them fail.

Paul shares a drink with Ben at The Queen Victoria pub but when Abi arrives, angry that Ben has made plans without her, Ben leaves Paul on his own. When Les realises Paul is upset, Paul tells his reunited grandparents that he is in love with Ben but cannot have him. Les encourages Paul to tell Ben his feelings, which he does, saying Ben must choose who he really wants and who he really is. However, Ben stays with Abi when she tells him she is pregnant, but when she says she has suffered a miscarriage, Ben seeks comfort from Paul. Ben then discovers that Abi lied and was never pregnant, leading to the breakup of their relationship; Ben and Paul then start dating, and Ben kisses Paul in public. When Pam and Les discover Paul and Ben have reunited, Pam upsets Paul by refusing to give them time alone, and she tells Les that Ben does not deserve a second chance with Paul. Pam lies to Ben to stop him seeing Paul but then promises Les that she will let Paul make his own choices. Ben tells Pam it is over between him and Paul because of her, but when she tells Paul, he is angry and she then tells Ben she is jealous that he makes him happy and apologises; Ben and Paul reunite.

Paul learns that Les and Pam are being blackmailed over Les' cross-dressing. The stress of the situation causes Les to suffer a heart attack while dressed as his female alter-ego, Christine, and because of this, Les' employee Billy Mitchell (Perry Fenwick) also discovers the cross-dressing. When Les is discharged from hospital, he and Pam decide to retire and move away, worried that Les's secret will be exposed, so Paul and Ben decide they should take over the running of the funeral parlour. Meanwhile, Paul's mother, Jenny Rawlinson (Amy Marston) arrives in Walford looking for Paul, and she sees him working on the flower stall. Paul does not know who she is, and when they talk about family, Jenny is surprised to discover that Pam has told Paul that his mother was never interested in him and that his father is dead. Later, when Paul sees Jenny with Pam at home, he accuses her of being the blackmailer and angrily sends her away. Paul is happy when Ben kisses him in public and declares his love. They get matching tattoos and go for a night out, while Pam is forced to put off telling Paul the truth about Jenny.

The next morning, Ben's half-brother Ian Beale (Adam Woodyatt) gets a call from the police saying that someone they believe is Ben has been critically injured following an incident and is in hospital. Ian and Phil are later told Ben has died, but when identifying the body, it is revealed to be Paul. The police then confirm that they are opening a murder investigation. Ben returns to Walford, severely injured, and tells his family that he and Paul went clubbing in Soho and on leaving, four men confronted them and they ran, getting split up in the process and accidentally taking each other's jackets. Phil tells Ben that Paul has died, leading to him breaking down, while Shirley Carter (Linda Henry) tells Pam and Les. Pam is in denial until they identify his body. Ben tells the police it was a random, unprovoked attack, but he tells Johnny Carter (Ted Reilly) that it was a homophobic attack, and Paul urged Ben to walk away but Ben confronted the four men, and blames himself for Paul's death.

== Reception ==
Paul's kiss with Ben in his first episode received a mixed reaction from viewers on Twitter, with many people praising the scene, but also a number of homophobic comments calling it "gross" and "cringing", which resulted in a backlash from those championing the couple. Executive Producer Treadwell-Collins reacted to the negative comments, saying: "Very very sad. It's 2015 people." When asked about the homophobic reaction to Paul and Ben's first kiss, Labey said "No matter what the storyline is, there'll be a backlash." He initially only saw a positive response, but found negative reactions later, but opined that it would not matter if it were a gay storyline or not, as "there's [always] people that don't agree or aren't comfortable watching". He also said, "I feel that in the gay community there's no homophobia but when you spread it to the wider community, you're going to get those responses." Laura Morgan from All About Soap said that Paul had made "quite an impression" in his first episode, having taken "under 30 minutes to single out Ben Mitchell and snog the face off him".

Further scenes of Paul and Ben received complaints, when the couple were seen topless together in a funeral parlour with a corpse in the room. Ofcom received 76 complaints. Labey initially questioned the scene himself on reading the script, but said, "you get the scenes and you deal with and just got on with it" and chose not to dwell on any criticism. An EastEnders spokesperson defended the scenes, saying, "The millions of regular EastEnders fans who tune in each week know and expect dramatic storylines. We are always mindful of our time slot in which we are shown and the scenes in question were implied and not explicit." Ofcom assessed the complaints and ruled that they did not warrant an investigation, with a spokesperson saying, "We found the scenes were justified in the context of a long-running plotline and sexual contact between the characters was implied rather than overt. Our rules don't discriminate between scenes involving opposite sex and same sex couples."

Anthony D. Langford from TheBacklot.com was pleased with Paul's introduction, saying the way Paul and Ben behave in Paul's first episode is "way more realistic and relatable than two teenagers or twenty-somethings who date for months before even having so much as a kiss", and he also liked that Paul has a storyline with his family as well as the one with Ben. In December 2015, the Daily Mirror said that Labey had made "such an impact in the soap already you would think he's been in Walford for years."

Following Paul's death, Alice Wright from the Metro listed 12 reasons he would be missed from EastEnders, including that he was "a warm and positive, openly gay character" who was "the only one who's been able to turn the barely stable and terribly moody Ben Mitchell into a happy little bunny full of smiles and plans for the future", he was "a much needed bit of eye candy", "adventurous and cheeky" and "always managed to add some light relief to his scenes", and that the "naked funeral parlour romp" was "TV history".

In July 2015, Paul's affair with Ben was longlisted at the Inside Soap Awards in the "Best Affair" category, but it did not make the viewer-voted shortlist.

== See also ==
- List of LGBT characters in television and radio
- List of soap operas with LGBT characters
