= Charlie Suff =

English actor and musician

- Born: Brighton, England
- Education: East Sussex College; Bristol Old Vic Theatre School
- Occupations: Actor; Musician
- Years active: 2017–present
- Agent: Creative Artists Management
- Television: EastEnders
- Musical career
- Instruments: Vocals; Guitar; Saxophone

Charlie Suff is an English actor and musician. He was born and grew up in Brighton and later studied Performing Arts at East Sussex College. Suff then trained at the Bristol Old Vic Theatre School and appeared in various theatre productions. Suff has also appeared in other plays, various short films and other productions, including a play he wrote during the COVID-19 pandemic, and guest starred in the British television shows Grace and Grantchester. In 2023, Suff was cast as Johnny Carter on the BBC soap opera EastEnders, becoming the third actor to play the character. He debuted as Johnny in February 2024 and was later nominated for "Best newcomer" at the 2024 Inside Soap Awards for the role.

== Early and personal life ==
Charlie Suff was raised in Brighton. He described his passion for performing from a young age as being "that shouting kid with pants on his head, prancing about to all the parents' amusement", which led to him to performing on the stage. Suff studied Performing Arts at East Sussex College, later returning to the school to deliver various workshops; Suff later said that he enjoyed studying the course there and made several friends, one of which he still lived with as of March 2024.

== Career ==
Suff trained at the Bristol Old Vic Theatre School, where he gained a BA (Hons) in Professional Acting. Suff performed in various theatre productions both within and outside of the Bristol Old Vic. Suff also portrayed lead roles in the short films Lucifer (2018) and The Other Soul to Evie (2020) and also wrote and performed his own short production called A Moment of Peace during the 2020 COVID-19 lockdown in the United Kingdom. In 2021, Suff portrayed Luke Jones in the first episode of the British crime drama Grace. In 2022, Suff played Andy in the film The Modern Way. That same year, he appeared as Jason in the short film Never Has a Man. In 2023, Suff guest starred in the premiere episode of the eighth series of the British ITV detective drama Granchester as a thug named Tommy Wilson. Suff also appeared in the short films Fantoma and Modern Love. Suff has also spoken about many auditions that he has "very almost" received or that went "nowhere", which he explained taught him to "appreciate each moment, whether good or bad".

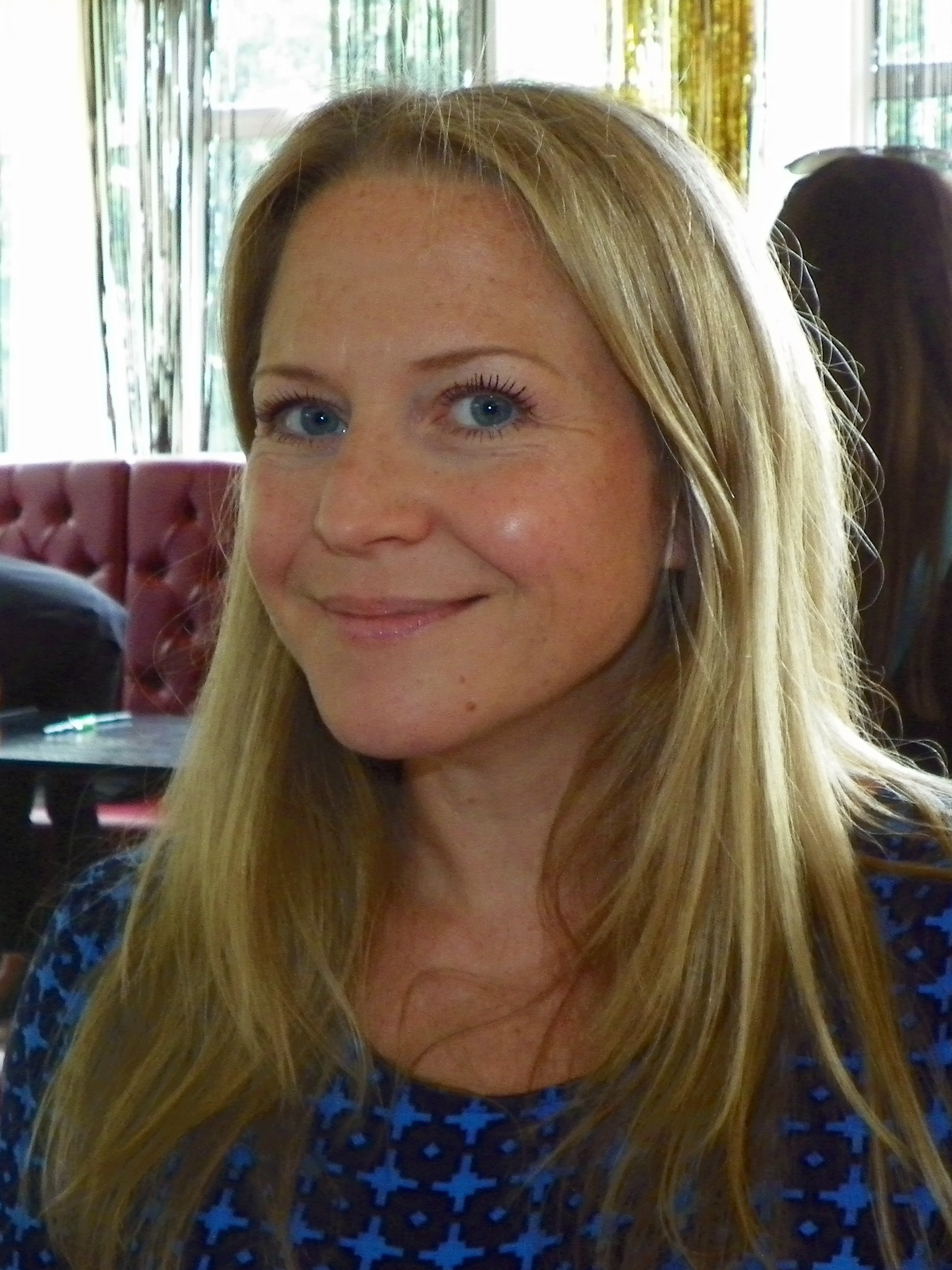
Suff developed a friendship with his EastEnders co-star Kellie Bright, who portrays his onscreen mother.

In December 2023, it was announced that Suff would be taking over the role of Johnny Carter on the BBC soap opera EastEnders. The role had previously been portrayed by Sam Strike from 2013 to 2014, followed by Ted Reilly from 2016 to 2018. EastEnders executive producer Chris Clenshaw said that he was "delighted" to welcome Suff in the role of Johnny, saying how he believed that Johnny was still linked to the soap and the "iconic" Queen Victoria pub despite not having appeared since 2018. Of joining the soap, Suff said, "Johnny is a complex character who has been through so much, which I can't wait to explore." and, "I've found EastEnders to be the most kind and loving space to work in, and I already feel like one of the family." Suff also revealed that he was "so delighted" to be joining the "iconic" programme, explaining that the soap was watched in his household when he was growing up.

Suff's first episode as Johnny aired on 9 February 2024. Suff's debut involved Johnny returning to the soap to help his mother, Linda Carter (Kellie Bright), who has relapsed into alcoholism. Suff hinted that Johnny would be returning to the soap with a "bang" and that Johnny has changed and grown since his time away due to no longer being protected by his parents. Since his debut, Suff's storylines as Johnny have involved supporting Linda with her alcoholism and other struggles, helping her cover up her killing of Keanu Taylor (Danny Walters) and kissing Callum Highway (Tony Clay). Suff also played a key part in an episode which featured a guest appearance from singer Olly Alexander before he represented the United Kingdom in the Eurovision Song Contest 2024. Suff said he enjoyed being part of the "The Six" storyline due to working with the female cast members involved, who he called "amazing" and "such titans" of the soap, and because he felt that the storyline showed how Johnny's character was no longer "that little boy". Suff also praised Bright for looking out for him and supporting him when he joined the soap, adding, "I quickly felt comfortable on the show and a massive part of that is from her. There's that motherly aspect, but day-to-day we're just friends and we giggle all the time!" For his role as Johnny, Suff was longlisted for "Best newcomer" at the 2024 Inside Soap Awards. In August 2026, it was reported that Suff would be leaving the soap as Johnny, which came after the news that Bright would also be leaving.

In addition to acting, Suff is also the lead singer of the band Third Face, which he also plays the saxophone and guitar for; the band has released singles and performed at various gigs.

== Acting credits ==
=== Filmography ===
Year	Title	Role	Notes	Ref.
Unknown	Modern Love	Tom	Short film	
Unknown	Fantoma	Raa	Short film	
2018	Lucifer	The Devil	Short film	
2020	A Moment of Peace	Himself/Narrator	Short film	
2022	The Other Soul to Evie	Felix Aldridge	Short film	
2021	Grace	Luke Jones	1 episode (series 1)	
2022	The Modern Way	Andy	Film	
2022	Never Has a Man	Jason	Short film	
2023	Granchester	Tommy Wilson	1 episode (series 8)	
2024–2026	EastEnders	Johnny Carter	Regular role	

=== Theatre ===
Year	Production	Venue	Role
Unknown	Jason and the Argonauts	Edinburgh Fringe/Take Thou That	Orpheus
Unknown	Journey to X	National Theatre Connections	Davey
Unknown	Under Milk Wood	Bristol Old Vic/West Country Tour	Lord Cutglass
Unknown	While Shepherds Watched	Bristol Old Vic/Schools Tour	Shepherd
Unknown	The Seagull	Bristol Old Vic	Trigorin
Unknown	The Beaux' Stratagem	Bristol Old Vic	Archer
Unknown	The Merchant of Venice	Bristol Old Vic	Lorenzo
Unknown	Constellations	Bristol Old Vic	Roland
Unknown	Flare Path	Bristol Old Vic	Peter Kyle
Unknown	Our Country's Good	Bristol Old Vic	Ralph Clark
Unknown	Multiplex	Brighton Fringe	Dillion
2017	How To Disappear Completely And Never Be Found	Bristol Old Vic/The Station	Tube Man/Barry
2018	The Elephant Man	Bristol Old Vic	Lord John/Snork/The Pinhead Master
2018	Dracula	Bristol Old Vic/Loco Klub	Jonathan Harker
2018	Outside	Clapham Omnibus	Charlie
2019	Cracks	Printers Playhouse	Kieron
2019	Divine Intervention	Ovalhouse	Val
2019	Weapons of the Weak	The Other Palace	Barry
2019	Lemons Lemons Lemons Lemons Lemons	Barons Court Theatre	Oliver

== Awards and nominations ==
List of acting awards and nominations
Year	Award	Category	Title	Result	Ref.
2024	Inside Soap Awards	Best Newcomer	EastEnders	Longlisted	
