= Joyce Murray (EastEnders) =

- EastEnders character
- Portrayed by: Maggie Steed
- Duration: 2017–18
- First appearance: Episode 5500; 26 May 2017
- Last appearance: Episode 5681; 30 March 2018
- Introduced by: Sean O'Connor
In-universe information
- Husband: Ted Murray (until 2018)
- Sons: Alan Murray
- Daughters: Judith Thompson; Barbara
- Grandchildren: Toby Thompson; Harriet Thompson; Jack Murray; Izzy Murray

Joyce Murray is a fictional character from the BBC soap opera EastEnders, played by Maggie Steed. Joyce was introduced alongside her husband, Ted Murray (Christopher Timothy), with the characters and castings being announced in April 2017 and Ted and Joyce making their first appearance on 26 May of that year. Both Steed and Timothy were excited to join the soap opera and were excited to be working together. Steed characterised Joyce as being a good and determined woman who adores Ted. Joyce's initial storyline revolved around her move to Albert Square, which she is not happy about, and her interactions with other characters, such as Dot Cotton (June Brown) and the new Taylor family. Joyce and Ted's backstories were explored when it was revealed that Ted is keeping a gun in the house, which Joyce does not approve of. When a traumatised Ted accidentally shoots Johnny Carter (Ted Reilly), Joyce tries to protect Ted by taking the blame and she is arrested, although the truth later comes out. It was later announced that Steed had been written out of EastEnders and Joyce made her final appearance on 30 March 2018, when the character was killed-off in her sleep. The aftermath of her death included the exploration of Ted's grief and the introduction of their daughter, Judith Thompson (Emma Fielding). Joyce received a mixed reception from viewers and critics, and the character's decision to take the blame for Johnny's shooting was criticised. Joyce's death and the storyline's aftermath were considered emotional and devastating.

== Casting and characterisation ==
In April 2017, it was announced that "legends of British TV" Maggie Steed and Christopher Timothy had been cast as Joyce and Ted Murray, respectively, on the British soap opera EastEnders. EastEnders executive producer Sean O'Connor revealed that he was delighted that Timothy and Steed had joined the soap, calling them "already much-loved by audiences", and he believed that it was "wonderful" to have "attracted such esteemed and acclaimed actors to the EastEnders cast". Teasing the characters, O'Connor teased, "The Murrays are a breath of fresh air to Walford having achieved a long-standing marriage. But it's not long before echoes of the past catch up with them. I'm very excited to see what these wonderful performers – and these fascinating characters – bring to Albert Square."

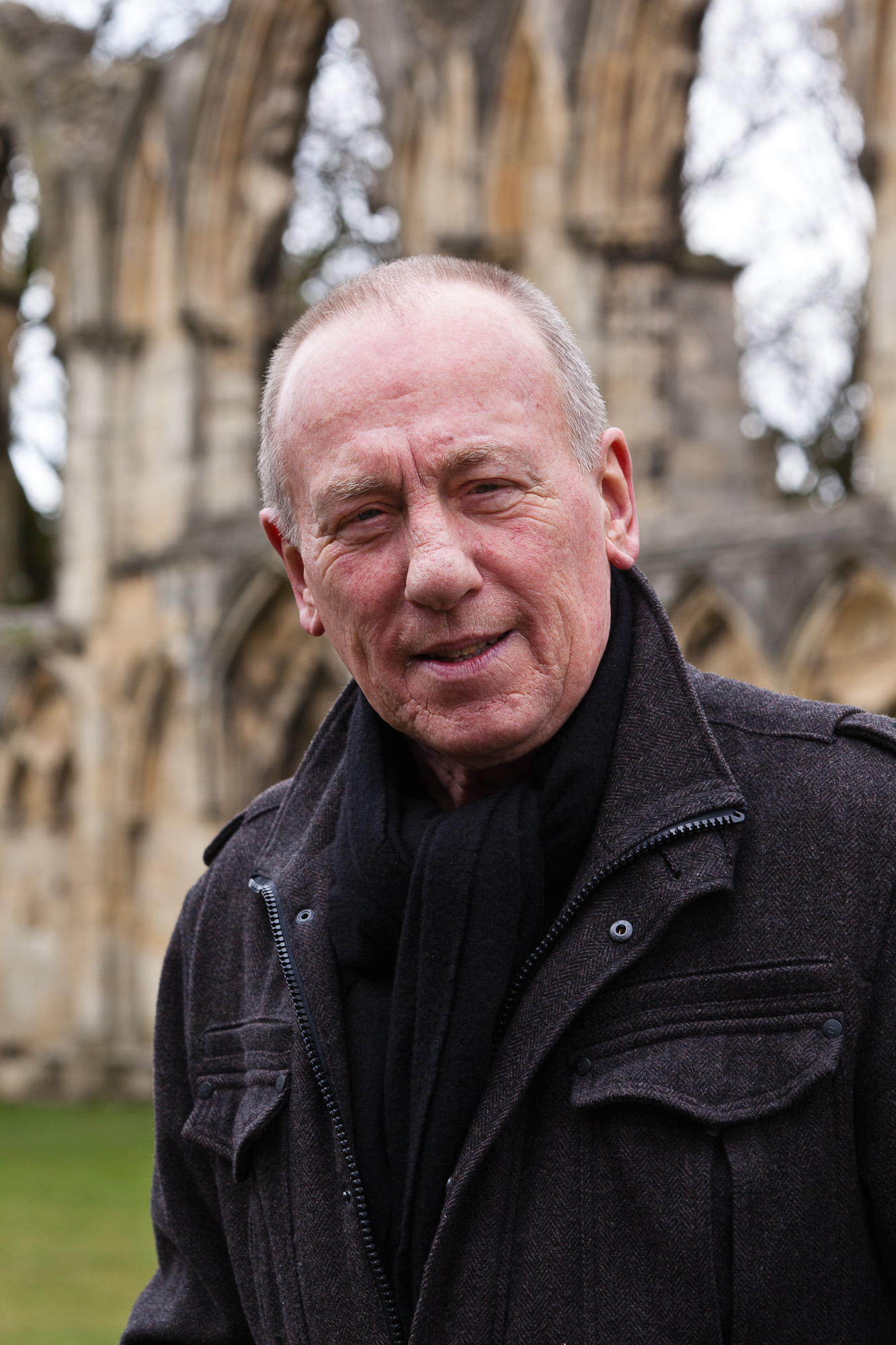
Christopher Timothy (pictured) was cast as Ted, Joyce's husband.

Steed revealed that she was "incredibly excited" to be joining "such a well-established" soap opera, and she was happy to be working with Timothy, who she believed was a "terrific actor" whom she would have a lot of "fun" with. Steed was very happy to join the soap with Timothy, explaining, "it really is very nice to come in with somebody else because those characters have got their own history together, and more importantly, it's very, very nice to come in with someone like Chris because we've got a lot in common and we respect each other a lot. So that's a saviour, really, because if you didn't have someone like that you really wouldn't be in with much of chance. We get on very well and we rely on each other a lot. I was thrilled when I heard it was Chris. Timothy was cast as Ted first; when Steed's casting as Joyce was finalised, an EastEnders writer told that Timothy that he thought that he would be "pleased" with Steed's casting. Timothy was also excited and "over the moon" to be working with Steed as he had admired her for a long time and cited her as one of his favourite actresses. He believed that filming their first scenes and episode together would very "exciting" and compare it the "first night in the theatre". Timothy also explained, "the bottom line is to do with us both being old school and I knew that, so I knew that even if we ended up not having anything in common we'd have that in common, when in fact we get on really well. It's great." Steed and Timothy met each other when they went to the set to meet Steve Finn, the director, and read their first few scenes from their first episode together.

Speaking about working on the soap, Steed admitted, "It's always strange walking into a set that you recognise so much, but you very soon get used to it is all I can say, and then you just carry on". Steed already knew her co-star Jenna Russell (Michelle Fowler) due to the pair being old friends and having worked together in the past, which she found "lovely", and Ian Lavender (Derek Harkinson), who she went to drama school with, which she found funny. Speaking to Woman's Weekly following Joyce's debut, Steed revealed that she was enjoying her time at EastEnders and felt lucky to have come into the show with Timothy "as a pair", commenting that they were "joined at the hip". She did not reveal much more about her character as she believed that giving away too much information about EastEnders is a worse crime than a minister leaving his "papers in a taxi!"

Steed described Joyce as a "very good woman", calling her "soft hearted" and "quite determined in her own way", and clarified that Joyce "adores" Ted, who she has been married to for nearly 60 years. Steed told What to Watch that Joyce "can get worried and frightened about things, but I think when push comes to shove she can be pretty strong as well". Timothy believed that Joyce and Ted are very "normal" and "hugely identifiable", and he believed that viewers would find similarities between the characters and people they know in real life. Timothy told Soaplife that the couple are "quite affectionate", explaining, that they "take the ride out of each other, but that's what every good marriage is like. There's a sense of humour underlying their relationship. You have your ups and downs, but actually everything's fine." Timothy revealed that he liked the characters of both Ted and Joyce, which he believed was "vital" as he believed that they would not have been able to portray them as well otherwise.

== Development ==
=== Introduction and initial storylines ===
Joyce and Ted were characterised as having been married for nearly 60 years and having lived in Walford their whole lives, and the pair already know "legendary" established character Dot Cotton (June Brown). However, Ted and Joyce's lives are "upheaved" when they are rehoused from a nearby estate to Albert Square. It was teased that their move would "usher in new tensions and new drama". Steed revealed that Joyce is not happy about being rehoused to Albert Square as, in their fictional backstory, she and Ted have lived in their council block since the 1960s, which they loved as they saw it as a "sort of heaven" as they originally moved from somewhere that "probably where you had an outside lavvy and that sort of thing". Steed added that the couple "brought their kids up there and so they had lots of memories and then it was going to be just pulled down. It's a big thing to have to up-end at that age and go somewhere else and make a home. It's a very big thing." Timothy hinted that the Murrays could have a "neighbourly feud" with Dot, revealing that the pair discover that she is their new neighbour in their debut episode. The pair remember her as they used to be neighbours years ago and Joyce believes that Dot was "always poking her nose in" and does not seem interested in getting reacquainted.

Steed and Timothy made their first appearances as Joyce and Ted on 26 May of that year. The couple's first episode revolved around Joyce and Ted preparing for their "new adventure" by packing up their stuff and saying goodbye to their flat. They then move into their new home and meet Sharon Watts (Letitia Dean), who wastes "no time" introducing herself: however, spoilers indicated that things would go "downhill" for the couple when Joyce discovers that Ted has brought a piece of their "past" with them and has broken their promise of a fresh start. EastEnders's Spring trailer suggested that Joyce and Ted would know the Taylor family – a new set of characters introduced the following month, consisting of Karen Taylor (Lorraine Stanley) and five of her children. Sophie Dainty from Digital Spy questioned whether the Taylors could be connected to the Murray's secret. Joyce and Murray's first episode revealed that Ted had brought a mahogany box with a gun inside of it. When Joyce realises, she snarls at Ted and tells him to get rid of it, but he hides it instead. Weeks later, Ted and Joyce meet Karen, who has just moved in as their new neighbour, and she immediately gets on the wrong side of the couple. Ted and Joyce initially dislike the Taylor family and months later tensions reach "boiling point" when the Murrays get a "nasty shock" and find out that they have been burgled; Ted blames the Taylors and reports them to the police, although Karen's oldest son Keanu (Danny Walters) promises that they were not involved.

=== Shooting and arrest ===
In September 2017, EastEnders aired a stunt which involved an arson attack and a gas explosion. As part of the stunt, it was reported that Ted would shoot someone, though it was not reported who it was. In the storyline, the explosion brings back "terrible memories" for Ted and Joyce struggles to keep him calm. The situation then gets out of control when Ted grabs takes out his gun for protection and he ends up shooting Johnny Carter (Ted Reilly) when he innocently goes to check on the couple. Daniel Kilkelly from Digital Spy had previously predicted that Johnny would be the character to be shot due to spoiler pictures showing Johnny in an ambulance and an earlier scene showing Ted talking about his time in the army, though he also predicted that it could be a member of the Taylor family or Dot, Johnny's father Mick Carter (Danny Dyer or Patrick Trueman (Rudolph Walker), as they had previously interacted with the Murrays too. Following the airing of the episode, which only showed the victim as a silhouette as the cliffhanger of the episode, Kilkelly's colleague Ben Lee reported how viewers believed that Johnny was the victim.

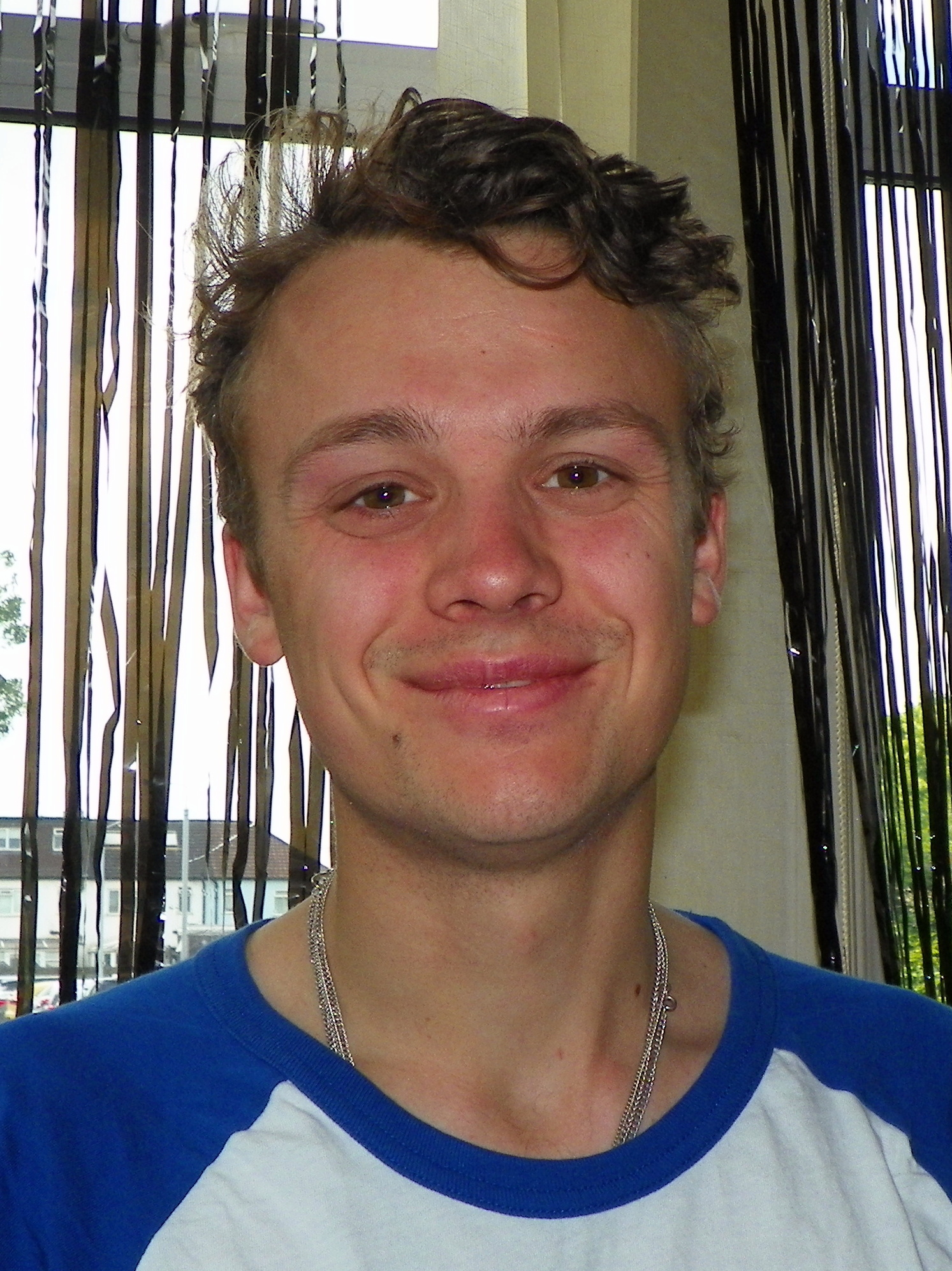
Joyce takes the blame for shooting Johnny Carter, played by Ted Reilly (pictured).

The following episode confirmed that Ted had shot Johnny and later armed police turn up following the shooting. Joyce decides to take the blame for the shooting and she is arrested instead of Ted. However, Joyce's cover-up is exposed when Johnny's "furious" mother Linda Carter (Kellie Bright) discovers the truth, so she and Mick confront the Murrays to get answers over what happened. Joyce, realising that the Carters are owed an explanation, tells them how Ted's traumatic past in the army is affecting his behaviour and Mick takes pity on the couple. Joyce and Linda also share a heart-to-heart about Ted's struggles and Linda begins to sympathise when Joyce reveals that Ted carries the burden of not being able to save his best friend and that he vowed to not let down his wife in the same way. Joyce and Ted's honesty result in the Carters not going to the police about the truth, but the police show up to the Murray's house and tell them that forensics have shown that Ted fired the gun, resulting in Ted being arrested for the shooting and Joyce is charged with perverting the course of justice. Digital Spy questioned whether the couple would face a prison sentence. The Carters forgive the Murrays and Johnny makes a full recovery and shows support to Joyce and Ted as their court date of sentencing looms, with the couple bracing themselves to learn their fates.

=== Death and aftermath ===
On 22 March 2018, it was reported that Steed had left EastEnders and that Joyce would be killed-off in her sleep, leaving Ted devastated "heartbroken", after producers decided to write the character out. Joyce's departure was announced less than a week after the news of the departures of Lee Ryan and Richard Blackwood as Woody Woodward and Vincent Hubbard, respectively. The casting decisions were made by new executive producer, John Yorke. A BBC insider teased, "Joyce's time on the Square has been a brief one and, after her death, Ted will come out of his shell a bit and viewers will see more of him. His and Joyce's daughter Judith will come into play and will be involved in new storylines with the Taylor family." Although EastEnders spokesperson declined to comment on the storyline, a source from the soap opera told Metro that Joyce's death would hit Ted "hard", adding that Joyce has "been there for him through some of his toughest times such as his PTSD and his depression. She was even willing to do a prison sentence for him so it's fair to say that he will really feel he has taken what he had in his marriage for granted". They also teased that Judith's arrival would bring more drama, adding, "It remains to be seen whether Ted can get through his loss and work together with Judith to say goodbye to Joyce in the right way." Duncan Lindsay from Metro also teased that Joyce's death would leave Ted's life in "tatters".

Joyce's death aired on 29 March 2018, when Joyce was seen lifeless on her bed at the end of the episode. In the storyline, Ted and Joyce clash as Ted is too busy helping his neighbour Bernadette Taylor (Clair Norris) prepare for a chess tournament, and Joyce becomes even more "furious" when Ted calls their daughter a bad mother and is "quick to point out his own shortcomings as a father". Ted then realises that he has been neglecting Joyce, but the realisation comes "tragically late" when he finds Joyce dead the following morning. The pair had briefly resolved their differences before Joyce's death and Ted had stayed with Joyce to speak to their son, but after a heart-to-heart she had given Ted her blessing to leave and help Bernadette after realising that he wanted to help her at the chess tournament. Ted then returns home to a note from Joyce saying that she has gone to bed, with Ted – who is "on cloud nine" over Bernadette's chess success – passing Joyce in the bedroom and wishing her goodnight, unaware that Joyce has died. Spoilers indicated that Ted would be "grief-stricken" following her death. Digital Spy reported that the aftermath of Joyce's sudden death would be a "sad week" for Ted, whilst TV Times reported that Ted would be "devastated".

Following Joyce's death, her daughter Judith Thompson (Emma Fielding) was introduced to EastEnders. In the storyline, Ted is "raw with grief" and is in denial over her death. He struggles to cope with the "enormity of his loss", and Bernie is a "mountain of support" and tries to help him by making arrangements for Joyce's funeral and encouraging him to tell his children about their mother's death. Ted, Bernadette and Karen have a meet with Jay Brown (Jamie Borthwick) over Joyce's funeral arrangements. When Judith arrives, tensions "mount" when she realises that Ted has kept the news of Joyce's death to himself for days and she accuses Ted of being a bad husband to Joyce and not bothering with his own family. She also deliberately goes against Ted's wishes for Joyce's funeral for what Joyce should be buried in, so Bernadette tries to help Ted by going into the funeral parlour to change Joyce's outfit, but she is caught by Jay. Ted later breaks down when he breaks a glass vase that belonged to Joyce, but he takes comfort from his neighbours when they arrange a memorial for her at the Queen Victoria pub and he raises a glass to his dead wife. Ted continues to struggle with Joyce's death, but months later he discovers letters that Joyce written for Ted to read. He considers burning the second letter as he is struggling with his memories of his late wife, but he ends up opening it and is left "shellshocked" when he finds out Joyce had bought him tickets to start a new life in Australia, which they had discussed the previous year.

== Storylines ==
Joyce and her husband Ted Murray (Christopher Timothy) move to Albert Square after being rehoused there. They move into their house and notice that Dot Cotton (June Brown) is their new neighbour and Joyce mentions that her son Nick Cotton (John Altman) used to be friends with their son Alan. Joyce is upset when she finds out that Ted has brought a box with a gun to their new house after they promised to leave the past behind. Ted and Joyce meet their friend Joan Murfield (Eileen Davies), who talks about a "neighbours from hell" family that has caused her to have a nervous breakdown. Ted and Joyce initially like their new house as they find it peaceful, but they are horrified when they discover that the family that caused Joan to have a breakdown – consisting of Karen Taylor (Lorraine Stanley) and five of her children – have moved into the house above them. Joyce is upset but not surprised when her daughter, Judith, cancels her visit on Father's Day. Joyce and Ted blame the Taylors when they are burgled, but Karen's oldest son Keanu (Danny Walters) promises that they were not involved and offers to board up their window, which Joyce is grateful for.

Months later, Ted panics when a gas tank explodes in the Square outside their window. Joyce tries to calm him down but Ted is convinced that someone is trying to harm them. Ted ends up accidentally shooting Johnny Carter (Ted Reilly) when he goes to check on the couple and Joyce, after calling emergency services, takes the blame for the shooting. Joyce visits Johnny in hospital and Johnny realises that Ted was the one who shot him. Johnny's mother, Linda Carter (Kellie Bright), is furious at the couple and Ted is later arrested for the shooting whilst Joyce is charged with perverting the course of justice. The couple pack a bag to prepare for prison, but they are relieved when they only receive community service due to Ted's psychiatric report and a letter Johnny wrote in their defence. Joyce thanks Johnny and offers to make him a roast dinner meal. Joyce goes on a night out with Karen on New Year's Eve and they have a fun at the Queen Victoria pub.

Joyce is happy when Ted forms a bond with Karen's daughter Bernadette Taylor (Clair Norris) and teaches her how to play chess, but becomes frustrated that it is taking over his time. Joyce becomes upset when Ted wants to skip a Skype call for Alan's birthday in order to attend a chess tournament with Bernadette and berated him for giving her the time and affection that he did not give to their own children. Ted ends up staying with Joyce but after Bernadette panics at the tournament, Joyce lets him join her as she realises the importance for both of them. Ted arrives home to find a note from Joyce saying that she has gone to bed early, but her body is found in her bed the following morning, and it is revealed that she died from cardiac arrest, devastating Ted.

== Reception ==
"So, Joyce Murray has popped her clogs. She didn't have much of an Albert Square adventure, did she? She was there for less than 12 months, and most of that time she was stressing about her noisy neighbours, worrying about gun-toting Ted, or waiting for son Alan to call from Australia – which he never did."

— A writer from TV Times reflecting on Joyce's departure (2018)

Following the announcement of Stead and Timothy's casting, Megan Davies from Digital Spy questioned whether Ted and Joyce would be another "disgruntled couple" in EastEnders. Daniel Falconer from Female First wrote that EastEnders was continuing to "add to its roster of incredible talent" by casting Timothy and Stead, who he called "two icons of British stage and screen". Duncan Lindsay from Metro questioned how Joyce and Ted would "cope with the upheaval to a whole new community" after being forced to move. Following Joyce and Ted's first appearance, Nicole Douglas from OK! reported how viewers were left "speechless" when Ted was revealed to have a gun.

Laura-Jayne Tyler from Inside Soap called Joyce the "gruff replacement" of established character Pam Coker (Lin Blakley), and she believed that it was "a bit cruel" that Joyce debuted the following episode after Pam's brief return to the soap. In July 2017, Tyler later noted that Joyce and Ted were "floating through the Square" without interacting with other characters, with Tyler asking, "Can [Ted and Joyce] even be seen? Will we discover that they actually died 40 years ago?" That September, Tyler wrote that she "finally warming" to the "cold-fish" couple after a scene where they suggested that they could have a "bit of snogging time", which Tyler writing "Aw!" Tyler later wrote that she enjoyed watching Joyce "frantically scrubbing at her invisible bloodstain", comparing her to "Lady Macbeth if she'd been able to lay her hands on a bottle of Cillit Bang". After Joyce was killed-off, Tyler joked that Joyce was "bored to death" by Ted's "chess obsession".

Rianne Houghton from Digital Spy was confused about why Joyce lied to the police that she shot Johnny instead of Ted, wondering what "on earth is going on" with the couple. She reported that viewers were expressing their frustration and "downright" confusion on Twitter over this decision, which she believed was "understandable" as Joyce did not do the shooting. She added, "It's not too late to change your mind, Joyce!" and noted that her charge would not "carry a light sentence". Houghton also noted how the scenes were part of the "most dramatic week" that the soap had ever seen, and that she was looking forward to finding out what was going on with Ted and Joyce. Houghton's colleague, Daniel Kilkelly, believed that Joyce had made matters "much worse" by her false confession. Following the shooting and Joyce's false confession, Hayley Minn from the Daily Mirror reported how viewers were "angry" and "LIVID" that Joyce and Ted were not in prison whilst another character, Martin Fowler (James Bye), was sentenced to two weeks in custody for another crime. Minn's colleague, Kat Romero, believed that the "surprising twist and turns" of the storylines had gripped viewers.

Jessica Gibb from the Daily Mirror called Joyce's departure a "shock decision". Katy Brent from Entertainment Daily called Joyce a "long-suffering wife" and called her death scenes and her farewell "sad" and tragic, as well as calling her death tragic and a "shock". Brent also questioned whether Ted would become a "better character" without Joyce. Duncan Lindsay from Metro called Joyce's death "shocking" and a "dramatic turn of events". Emma Costello from RSVP Live believed that Steed and Timothy "clearly have not wowed bosses enough with their performances" due to the fact that Joyce had killed-off. Costello also believed that viewers would be "devastated" by Joyce's death, and added that there would be "no coming back" for Joyce, unlike other characters that had departed the soap. Charlotte Tutton from OK! reported how viewers had expressed their "shock" on social media following the broadcast of Joyce's death. Tutton later reported that viewers were questioning on Twitter how Joyce had died. She wrote that viewers "felt for Ted", who was wondering what had happened to cause Joyce's "shock" death "considering she seemed fine just moments before". Sophie Dainty from Digital Spy called Ted and Joyce's final moment together "bittersweet" and was sad over Joyce's death, calling the storyline and its aftermath "heartbreaking", "devastating" and tragic. Dainty was grateful that Joyce and Ted had resolved their differences before Joyce's death. In April 2018, the Belfast Telegraph and Laura Harding from the Irish Independent reported how viewers were "in tears" over Ted's final farewell to Joyce following her memorial. Beth Allcock from OK called Ted's discovery of Joyce's letters and tickets "huge" and "shocking".
