= Danny Pennant =

Fictional character from EastEnders

- EastEnders character
- Portrayed by: Gary Lucy
- Duration: 2012–14
- First appearance: Episode 4504; 27 September 2012
- Last appearance: Episode 4804; 14 February 2014
- Introduced by: Lorraine Newman
In-universe information
- Occupation: Bank manager; Estate agent; Personal trainer

Danny Pennant is a fictional character from the BBC soap opera EastEnders, played by Gary Lucy. The character and casting was announced in August 2012 and Lucy made his first appearance on 27 September 2012. Lucy was happy to be cast in the soap as he had grown up watching it in his household and was happy to portray an LGBTQ+ character. Danny was characterised as a city banker with sex appeal and charisma. Danny was initially introduced in a guest stint as part of a love triangle between established gay characters Syed Masood (Marc Elliott) and Christian Clarke (John Partridge). In the storyline, Danny and Syed kiss several times, which threatens the latter's engagement to Christian. Lucy could not sleep the night before his first same-sex kiss but he praised Elliot for making him comfortable. Lucy had been warned that he could face backlash from fans of Christian and Syed's pairing, but he believed that the role was too good to turn down. Danny later tries to blackmail Christian and Syed after they get married, but this fails and Danny departs in the episode broadcast on 2 November 2012. Lucy expected to get a lot of online hate for Danny's actions, but this did not happen.

Lucy returned to the role in 2013 as a regular cast member, which he was happy about as he wanted to explore the character further. Danny's return aired on 7 June of that year. Upon his return, Danny begins working for Janine Butcher (Charlie Brooks) and has sex with her. Lucy explained that Danny has a complex sexual preference and hinted that Danny might be using Janine for his own gain. Danny later begins a relationship with Lucy Beale (Hetti Bywater), but he ends up flirting and kissing Johnny Carter (Sam Strike) as part of his coming out storyline. Danny was later written out of the soap and he made his final appearance as Danny on 14 February 2014; his departure saw Lucy find out that Danny has been messaging Johnny on a dating app and she threatens to expose him for embezzlement if he does not leave. For his role as Danny, Pennant was longlisted for the Villain of the Year at the 2013 British Soap Awards. Some critics were surprised by Danny's romances with Lucy and Janine, whilst some viewers were unhappy with the way that Danny presented bisexuality. Johnny and Danny's same-sex kiss received complaints from some viewers but this was criticised by critics, Lucy and EastEnders writers.

== Casting ==
On 3 August 2012, it was announced that Gary Lucy had joined the cast of EastEnders as Danny Pennant in a guest role. The length of Lucy's stint was unknown at the time of the announcement. Lucy had previously appeared in two other soap operas, Hollyoaks and The Bill. Danny was described as being a "trouble-maker" and "mischievous" city banker and it was teased that he would "turn heads" in Walford, where the soap is set. It was teased that Danny "oozes sex appeal" and has a "compelling charisma", with an EastEnders statement revealing, "With his irresistible charm and luring persona, Danny is desired and envied by both men and women - girls want to be seen with him and boys want to be him. He will inevitably create controversial encounters and his provocative and lustful nature is bound to land him in trouble". It was later reported that Danny would be involved in a love triangle with established gay characters. Although Danny was originally reported to be gay, the character was later referred to as bisexual. Lucy believed that it was a "fantastic" opportunity to portray a bisexual character, saying, "It's different for me, a challenge, but one I'm happy to grasp and I'm enjoying". Lucy made his first appearance as Danny on 27 September 2012. Lucy's mother was "thrilled" when he joined EastEnders as she was a fan of all the British soap operas and a massive fan of EastEnders, with Lucy growing up with it in his household. Lucy has revealed that similarly to Danny, he has some financial knowledge. Lucy also called Danny a "great character to play".

== Development ==
=== Relationship with Syed ===
Prior to Danny's first appearance, it was reported that Danny is attracted to men and that he would be involved in a love triangle with established engaged couple Syed Masood (Marc Elliott) and Christian Clarke (John Partridge). A source had previously revealed, "All the girls think [Danny is] a real ladies' man. But they're soon disappointed when it turns out he's not interested in women. He'll ruffle a few feathers and Christian and Syed's relationship will be tested". An EastEnders spokesperson did not confirm or deny the storyline as did not want to spoil the storyline for viewers, but they confirmed that Danny would cause issues for some established characters. Both Elliot and Clarke were set to depart EastEnders later in 2012, with Lucy hinting that Danny could be involved in their departure, saying, "I don't think it's the real reason that they leave, but I don't think it helps much". Syed and Christian had not any significant storylines since March of that year.

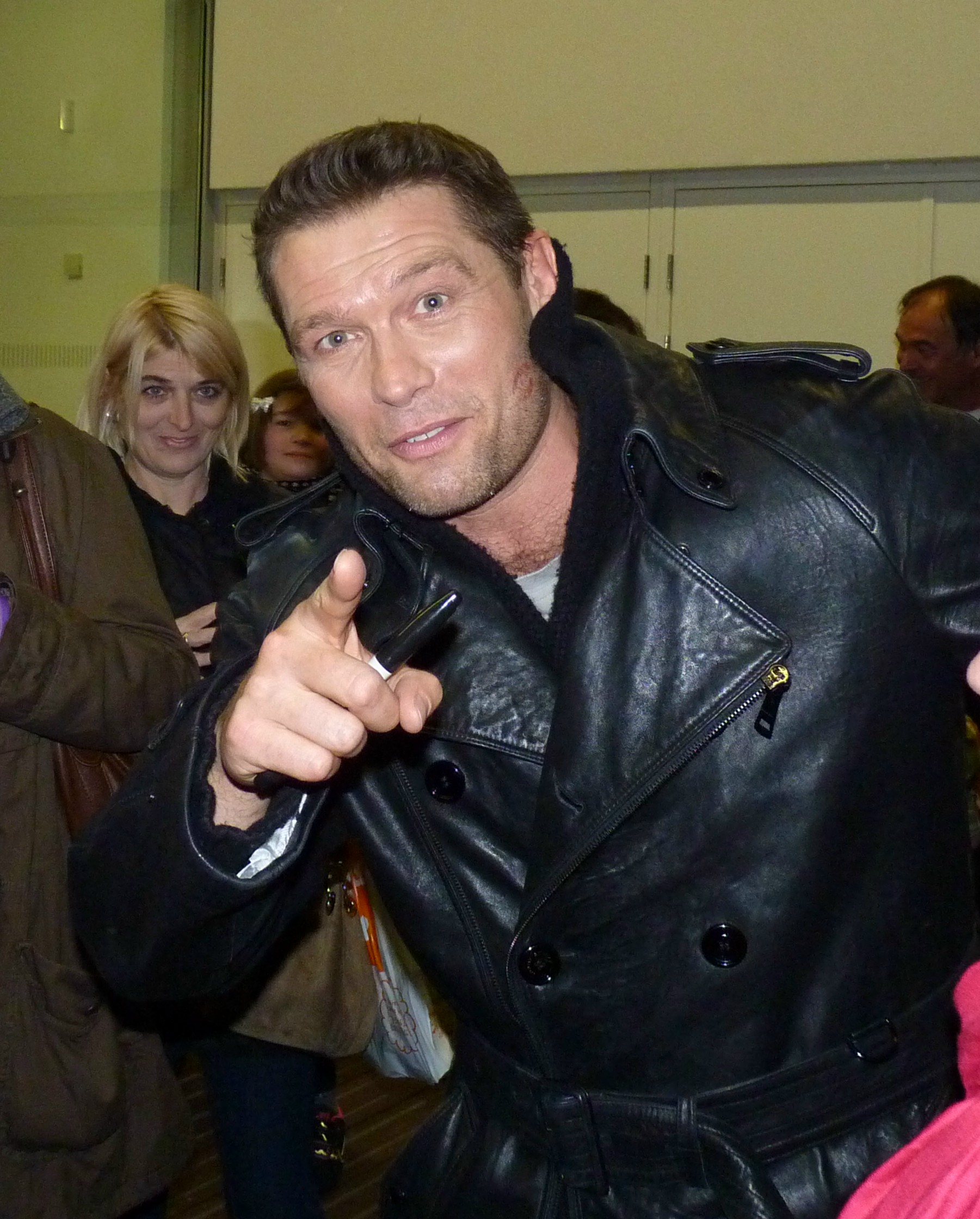
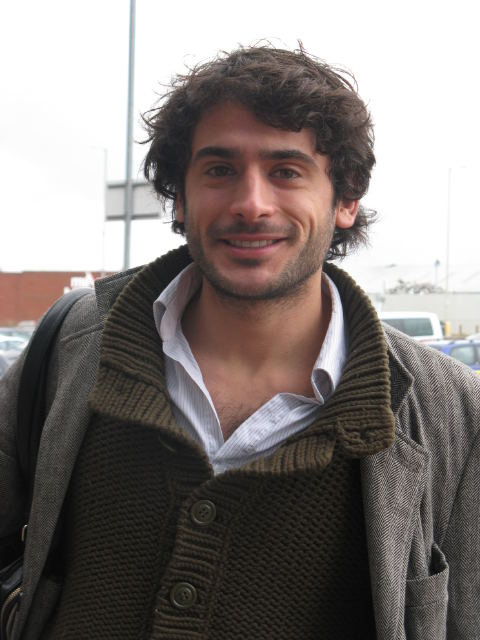
Danny was involved in a triangle with Christian and Syed, portrayed by John Partidge (left) and Marc Elliot (right) respectively.

Lucy revealed that he could not sleep the night before he filmed his first kissing scenes with Elliott, explaining, "It was the first time I'd kissed a guy, so it was different. "The night before I just had to tell myself, 'Right, I'm going to work and kiss a bloke' - all night". Lucy found it fortunate that Elliot was very nice and "easy-going" and the pair ran the scene a few times, which Lucy found "absolutely fine" and not awkward, explaining, "You're into the scene and the character... so you just get on with it. But, as I would with a female character, I saved the actual kiss for the last take. You don't want to peak too early!" Lucy believed that there was not much difference between kissing a man or a woman and said that he tried to respect the other person by "not putting your tongue down their throat". Lucy had warned his family and friends about what would happen with Danny and Syed, and he was thankful that his mother liked the plot. Lucy himself had been warned that he could face backlash from "obsessive" fans of Syed and Christian that did not want the couple to split up; the actor was not sure if he could handle the backlash but added that it was "such a good opportunity to come in and ruffle feathers that I just couldn't turn [the role] down". Lucy was unsure if Danny would be a permanent character but enjoyed playing him and enjoyed his stint in the soap, calling it a "good experience and a fantastic challenge".

In the storyline, Danny and his colleagues arrive at Argee Bhajee, where Syed is working, and he is initially unimpressed by their conversations that he overhears Danny having with the other city bankers. However, Danny later speaks to Syed alone after sensing that he is struggling and Syed opens up about his financial issues and other problems. The next day, there is "noticeable chemistry" when Danny and Syed have a business lunch together and Syed is surprised when Danny invites him to have a drink later. Christian is initially unaware that there may be an attraction between the pair. Syed meets and consults Danny several other times and on a night out, the pair have a heart-to-heart and Syed "gets lost in the moment" and kisses Danny. Syed continues to be tempted by Danny. Talking to Soaplife, Elliot explained that Syed is genuinely torn between his feelings between Danny and Christian, explaining, "He doesn't know what he wants. Should he go for a penthouse on the Riviera and a life with Danny? Or should he choose a flat with his husband next to his parents? Christian is his true love, but he thinks the grass might be greener".

The next day at his own stag do, Syed slips out to the Argee Bhajee as he needs to "clear his head" due to his recent problems, and Danny follows him there. Danny makes matters worse when he tries to convince Syed that they should be together, but Syed tells him that he loves Christian and wants a return on his investment, though Danny admits that he has lost the money as the investment fell through. Danny is unable to take Syed's rejection and tries to kiss him just as Syed's father, Masood Ahmed (Nitin Ganatra), walks in. Masood reveals that he witness their kiss from the previous night when Syed tries to make excuses and Danny says that Syed wanted to be caught out, which leads to an angry Syed punching him. Daniel Kilkelly noted how Syed had been "pushed too far" by Danny's "mischievous advances". The following day on the morning of the civil partnership, Christian finds out about Syed and Danny's kiss, and whilst Christian is willing to forgive him, Syed says that he is unsure if they should get married as he is unsure of what he wants; however, the pair end up going with his civil partnership as Syed realises that he truly loves Christian. Speaking on This Morning, Elliot revealed that Danny would return for revenge and cause more drama for Syed, saying, "He returns - he can't be punched in the face in the Argee Bhajee and leave without his dignity! He's got to come back and get some sort of revenge, and he does". Elliot also teased that Danny would be involved a storyline with Christian would potentially result in Christian being arrested by the police. Danny's final episode in his 2012 guest stint aired on 2 November 2012.

=== Return and romances with women ===
"He's quite complex when it comes to his sexual preference. Last time he was seen, he made a beeline for Janine and realised that she was the one with the money on the Square. I think he's quite charming, and as the weeks go on, we learn a little bit more about Danny and what lengths he's willing to go to, to get what he wants. Whether it's a romantic thing or whether it's just purely for his own personal gain remains to be seen... I think with him, nothing is as it seems. At the beginning at least, you're always left guessing about what he's thinking and what he's up to at any time".

— Lucy on Danny's sexuality and characterisation (2013)

In March 2013, it was announced that Lucy would be returning as Danny as a regular cast member. Speaking of his return, Lucy said, "I'm extremely excited to be joining such a fantastic show - one which my family are huge fans of and I grew up watching. I enjoyed the little taster last September and am looking forward to exploring my character further, seeing what's in store for him and which characters it will involve". EastEnders executive producer Lorraine Newman was "absolutely delighted" to welcome Lucy back to the soap, adding, "Gary clearly felt at home on the show and his wonderful portrayal of Danny Pennant left us with an intriguing character to explore - it really was only a matter of time before he returned. Danny's stories will see him crossing paths with some of our best loved characters, and I am sure the audience will relish in the fact that the complex nature of this character means that nothing is ever simple". It was reported that Danny's return would see him "lured" back to Walford on business.

Lucy said that he was very happy when he found out that EastEnders wanted him to return. He explained that when he had left at the end of his guest stint a return had been talked about but was not confirmed, which he was really hoping would happen. He believed that there was a lot more that could be explored through Danny's character and was happy to now be able to do so as otherwise it would have been a "shame". He added, "Everything I've done so far has been really interesting, and based on the discussions we've had, I reckon we're in for good stuff". Lucy promised an "eventful" return and teased that viewers would see a softer side to Danny's character and that Danny would have a new love interest. Gary also revealed that he had signed a long-term contract with EastEnders. Lucy also revealed that his seven-year-old daughter liked watching on him EastEnders as she was a fan of the soap and she could not wait to see him back onscreen, which he called a "nice experience for the whole family". He also believed that his daughter secretly wanted him to get her a role in the soap.

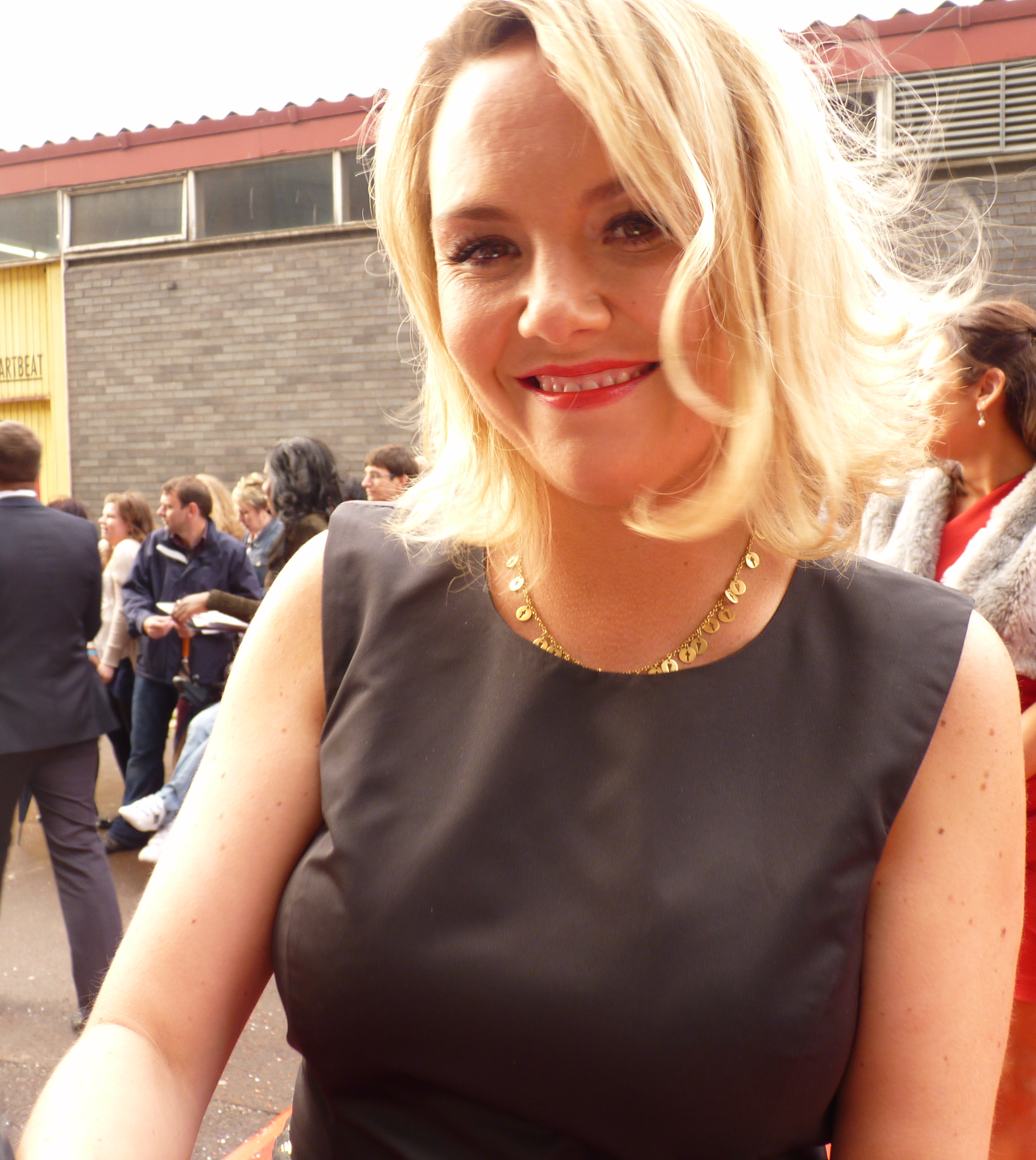
Upon his return, Danny begins working for and kisses Janine, played by Charlie Brooks.

Danny brief return aired on 7 June of that year, before returning the following month as a regular. Danny's initial return sees him attend the opening of Ian Beale's (Adam Woodyatt) new restaurant, with Ian keen to impress the city banker so that he will invest in the restaurant so that he does not have to work with Janine Butcher (Charlie Brooks) anymore; however, waitress Lauren Branning (Jacqueline Jossa) spills a drink on Danny, who later disappoints Ian when he tells him that he will not advising people to invest in his restaurant. Speaking on the talk show Lorraine that Danny would make a "bee-line" for Janine in the episode, explaining, "I think he sees that she's the one with the money on the Square and there's a little bit of chemistry there. I think he's interested in tapping into her". Lucy also revealed that Danny would bump into Masood, who is not happy to see him due to his treatment of Syed.

When Danny returns the following month, he has lost his job in the city and works with Janine in order to make money again, telling her that he would like to help her with her investments. Janine's estranged husband, Michael Moon (Steve John Shepherd), is not happy that Janine has taken a shine to Danny, but this changes when he finds out that Danny was the man to come between Syed and Christian. Lucy explained that Michael does not see Danny as a threat as he is "adamant" that Danny is gay; however, Lucy teased that "as the weeks go on, things unravel. Nothing is as it seems with Danny, and that is the key at the moment". Pennant also explained that Janine and Danny initially have a "fun" relationship, with Janine thinking that Danny is going to introduce her to a lot of rich city men. Lucy told Soaplife that Danny has his eye on Janine, but that viewers would have to wait to see if it would develop romantically. Lucy added that Danny is not "what you think he is. That's the great thing about Danny. Nothing is ever as it seems with him. Michael is relieved that Danny's gay, but you never know, he might have that smile wiped off his face. Danny is a complicated character as far as his sexuality goes".

Michael continues to warn Janine off Danny but he is able to stay in control of the situation. Later, Janine is angry when she later finds out that Michael has been flirting with her to get access to their daughter Scarlett Moon and, not wanting to be alone, she calls Danny over and kisses him outside her house, making Michael angry that she has moved on so quickly. However, it was teased that Danny might have different reasons for kissing Janine rather than "blossoming love" and that he may just be seducing her to get her money. Lucy believed that Danny has a complex sexuality and can easily adapt to any situation, explaining that his character is, "quite charming and confident in himself, in both ways - in his sexuality and his business mind". Lucy revealed on This Morning that Danny's true intentions would be clear. When asked if Danny is gay, Lucy replied, "I think he's complex, and some might say greedy!" Later in 2013, Janine fires Danny and Ian's daughter Lucy Beale (Hetti Bywater) in order to save money to be able to buy the Queen Vic pub; although Lucy and Danny beg Janine to give them another chance, she refuses and the unemployed pair and drown "their sorrows" in the pub and drink a lot of alcohol. When Lucy offers to persuade Ian to give Danny a job, he flirts with her and the pair end up kissing. Later on, Danny seduces Lucy so that she covers up his embezzlement of Butcher's Joint's profits.

=== Kiss with Johnny ===
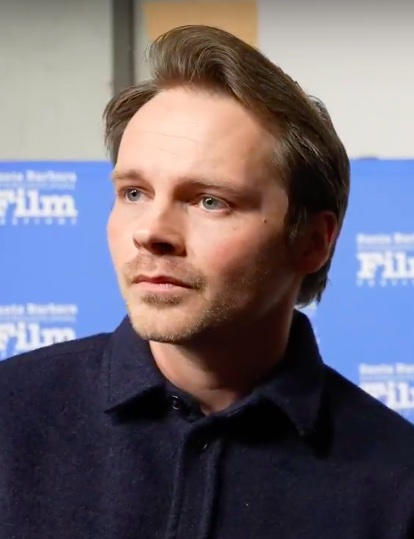
Danny kisses Johnny, played by Sam Strike.

In late 2013, Danny flirts and kisses new character Johnny Carter (Sam Strike) whilst also dating Lucy. Johnny and Danny have a "passionate" kiss hours after meeting. The kiss was part of a storyline which saw Johnny later come out to his father Mick Carter (Danny Dyer) as gay and discuss his sexuality. The same-sex kiss got several complaints from viewers on social media and two BBC complaints. The episode aired later that usual, though a BBC spokeswoman confirmed that this was not because of the content of the episode. The spokeswoman added, "EastEnders aims to reflect real life, and this means including and telling stories about characters from many different backgrounds, faiths, religions and sexualities", and explained that producers ensured that homosexual relationships portrayals were suitable for pre-watershed viewing. Speaking of the complaints, Lucy said, "I think, 'Get with the times!' Reaction was, on the most part, positive. There were a few on Twitter still living in the dark ages but on the whole, people were okay". Lucy revealed that he had received a message online from a viewer thanking him for the storyline as it had encouraged him to come out to his parents, with Lucy commenting, "If you can do that, you as an actor and the show has done its job". Pete Lawson, who wrote the episode, wrote on Twitter, "2014, and gay teens kissing on a soap still draws complaints. Makes me even prouder to have written [the episode]". Daran Little, who wrote a later episode where Johnny comes out to Mick, criticised how viewers were complaining about the same-sex kiss and believed that it showed a lack of progress regarding people's attitudes towards homosexuality.

=== Departure ===
In January 2014, it was announced that Lucy had filmed his final scenes on EastEnders and that Danny would be departing the soap due to Lucy's contract not being renewed. An EastEnders spokesperson confirmed that Lucy would be departing the soap and wished him the best for the future. Following the news, Lucy thanked fans for their support and hinted that he could return to the soap, writing on Twitter, "thank you for your messages loved my time [at EastEnders] interesting character with lots of scope see u later rather than good bye ;-) ps more 2 come x". Lucy accidentally tagged the mobile network EE instead of EastEnders in his Twitter message. Lucy's departure was part of a reported "cast cull" by new executive producer Dominic Treadwell-Collins, though it was also reported that his exit was part of a mutual decision between Lucy and the producers. It was suggested that the door would be left open for the character to return in the future. Lucy made his final appearance on Danny in the episode that originally aired on 14 February 2014. In his exit storyline, Lucy finds out that Danny has been wooing Johnny on a dating website as the "Walford Wonder" and she throws his money out of the window, leading to Danny leaving Walford. When asked later in 2014 if Danny could return to the soap, Lucy said that it was possible but that he was not thinking about it right now, though he added that he enjoyed his stint in the soap. Lucy was open to joining another soap opera. Whilst reflecting on the role in 2019, Lucy said that he enjoyed being on EastEnders and was glad to be part of such an "iconic" television show, and added that Danny had been brought in to "ruffle a few feathers".

== Storylines ==
Danny and his colleagues go to the Argee Bhajee, the local Indian restaurant, for a meal. There, he meets restaurant worker Syed Masood (Marc Elliott). Danny returns when the restaurant is closed and talks to Syed. Syed confides in him that he is having money issues and Danny urges Syed to be honest with his family about it, although he does not take his advice. Danny and Syed meet in secret again and he invests money and borrows £500. The pair become close and kiss twice, with the second being witnessed by Syed's father Masood Ahmed (Nitin Ganatra). Danny meets Syed's fiancé Christian Clarke (John Partridge) and when Syed leaves his stag party, Danny follows and tries to kiss him again, but Syed says he loves Christian and asks for his money back but Danny tells him that the investment has fallen through. Syed punches Danny when he suggests that Syed wants to be caught. When Christian finds out, he and Syed nearly do not marry but they go through it with. Danny continues to text Syed demanding his £500 back. When Christian sees the messages, he replies through Syed's phone and goes to meet Danny. Christian punches Danny when he lies that he had sex with Christian and it is implied that the pair have a violent fight when Syed finds Christian badly beaten the next day. Christian is arrested when Danny reports him for assault; Danny offers to withdraw his statement if Syed returns his £500, but Masood threatens to report Danny for fraud regarding his failed investment, leading to Christian being released.

The following year, Danny attends the opening of Ian Beale's (Adam Woodyatt) but tells a disappointed Ian that he will not invest in it as he only helps people to invest. Danny starts working for Janine Butcher (Charlie Brooks) and he ends up kissing her. After they have sex, Janine tells him that it is just a one-off. Danny competes with his co-worker Lucy Beale (Hetti Bywater) and they use dirty tactics to compete and gain commission on their pay. Lucy finds out that Danny is homeless and agrees to keep it a secret but tells him that she now has power over him. Janine later fires Danny and Lucy to free up more money to buy the Queen Vic pub. Danny and Lucy end up kissing when they drink a lot of alcohol at the pub and they convince Billy Mitchell (Perry Fenwick) to give them their jobs back when Janine is arrested. Lucy and Danny become a couple but Danny ends up flirting with and kissing Johnny Carter (Sam Strike), who is struggling with his sexuality. Johnny later finds out that Danny is stalking him on a gay dating website as the "Walford Wonder". Lucy finds out that Danny has been stealing from Janine and the couple plan to set up their own estate agents when they lose their jobs. Lucy and Danny plan to buy a flat but Johnny reveals Danny's online actions. A heartbroken Lucy confronts Danny and asks if he is only with her for Janine's money. Danny says no, but Lucy does not believe him and throws his money out of the window, which the residents help themselves too. Lucy demands that Danny leaves and threatens to report him for the embezzlement, so Danny leaves with some of the money that he rescued. Lucy is found dead months later but Danny is ruled out as a suspect by the police as he had moved to Marbella.

== Reception ==
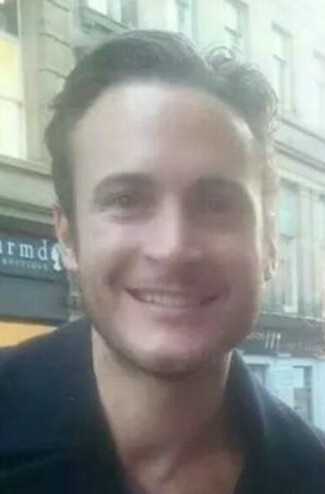
Lucy was nominated for Villain of the Year for his portrayal of Danny.

For his role as Danny, Pennant was longlisted for the Villain of the Year at the 2013 British Soap Awards. The episode that featured Danny's 2012 debut drew in 7.32m viewers, a share of 35.9%, making it the most-viewed British soap opera of that day, whilst the BBC Three repeat screening later that day drew in 467,000 viewers, a share of 3.2%. Discussing Danny's first two episodes, Daniel Kilkelly from Digital Spy believed that there was "noticeable chemistry" between Danny and Syed and wrote that Danny showed his "caring side" when he got Syed to open up, which he called a "twist". Kilkelly later called Danny "mischievous". In 2013, Kilkelly called Danny "charming". Kilkelly also believed that Danny and Lucy were an "unlikely pair" and called their kiss a "surprise". Kilkelly's colleague, Paul Millar, called Danny and Syed's kiss a "surprise". Anthony D. Langford from AfterElton was disappointed by Danny's 2012 exit as he believed that Danny could have been an "interesting long term character". Langford compared Danny to Hollyoaks Brendan Brady (Emmett J. Scanlan) due to both characters being a "delicious mix of villainy, danger and sex appeal" and he believed that Lucy had been "terrific" in portraying Danny. Langford also enjoyed the scene where Danny threatened Syed but criticised EastEnders for not confirming how far Danny and Syed had gone after they kissed. He also found the scene where the Masood men intimidate Danny "funny".

Patrick McLennan from What to Watch called Danny a "bisexual bad boy". Matt Shine from Female First called Danny a "cheeky lothario" and a "hunky salesman". Shine's colleague Daniel Falconer praised Gary Lucy and the other cast, crew and writers involved in devising Danny and Johnny's same-sex kiss for making it "so much easier for that real-life version of their characters to live their life without trepidation"; Falconer also believed that Lucy played Danny "brilliantly" and criticised viewers that complained about the same-sex kiss. Lucy revealed that after the same-sex kiss with Johnny aired, Lucy received a lot of sexual messages on Twitter and he commented, "I get a few offers on Twitter, some slightly extreme! I take it in my stride ... They say what they like to do and what they did do when they watched it!" Lucy had been warned that he would receive a "hard time" for Danny interfering in Syed and Christian's relationship but this did not happen, with Lucy commenting, "I expected to get a barrage of abuse on Twitter, but fortunately didn't. I think people might have taken to Danny in the end, so it actually turned out fine".

A writer from BBC One called Danny "Albert Square's resident lothario". Daisy Buchanan from the Daily Mirror was confused by Danny kissing Janine and joked, "How does a banker stay recession proof? If he's Danny Pennant, he engages in a spot of transactional romance - even if and he'll go after a different gender if it suits his agenda". Buchannan believed that Danny was prepare to "forget his sexuality" and seduce Janine in order to get to her money. She also questioned whether Janine genuinely liked Danny or if she was just trying to make Michael jealous. Following the news of Danny's exit, Amy Duncan from Metro wrote "Another one bites the dust!" and opined that Danny was another "victim of the EastEnders cast cull". She also called Danny a "bisexual manipulator" that had "certainly made a mark in the Square" and believed that there would be more "fireworks" from the character before he leaves. Duncan's colleague Vicky Prior criticised Danny's return to the soap and wondered why he had returned in the first place. She criticised Danny's actions as "stupid" and "daft" and other elements of the character, though she liked Danny's exit storyline of Lucy throwing his money out of the window as she found it a "nice twist on the usual black cab exit". Prior added:

"Now I mean no disrespect to Gary Lucy, who is a great actor, but in playing Danny he didn't get a chance to shine. I put this firmly down to Danny being a weak character. He may have managed to fool Janine into sleeping with him, but Danny's sexual ambivalence angered bisexual viewers who felt they were being unfairly represented. Essentially, he slept with whoever suited his finances best, not the most flattering portrayal. As it turned out, Danny's greediness, both financial and sexual, was to be his undoing."
