= Daran Little =

British television writer (born 1966)

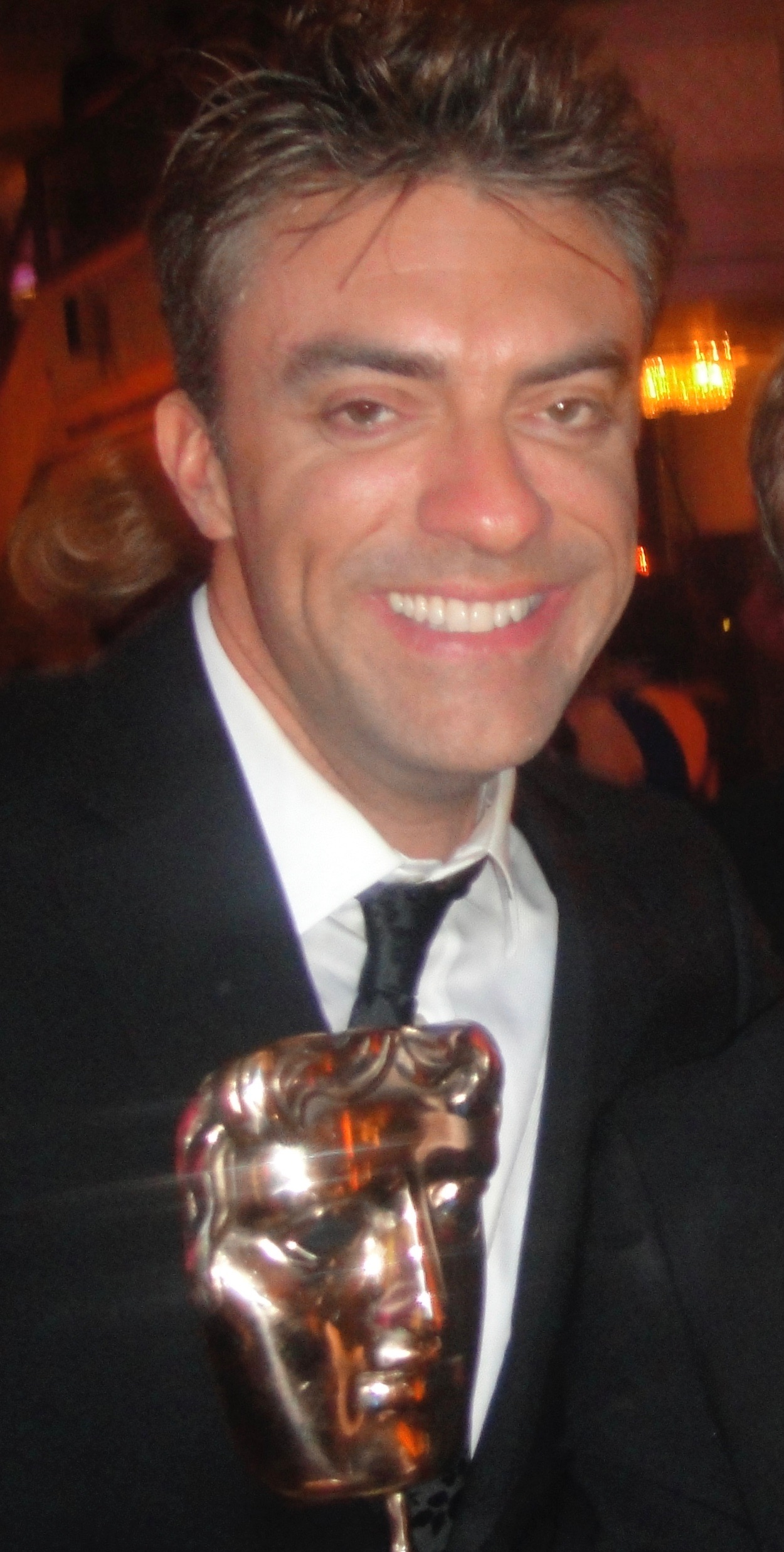
- Little at the 2011 BAFTAs
- Born: 11 May 1966 (age 60)
- Education: Manchester Polytechnic
- Years active: 1995–present
- Children: 2

Daran Arthur Peter Little (born 11 May 1966) is a British television writer who has won a BAFTA award and been nominated for an Emmy Award. He is the only writer to pen more than 100 episodes of both Coronation Street (2000–2010) and EastEnders (2010–).

== Early life ==
Little was born to working class family and grew up on West End Road in Ruislip Manor. His grandfather was Romani. Through researching his genealogy, Little discovered he is a distant descendant of notable figures such as Alfred the Great and William the Conqueror, as well as the Australian bush wrangler Daniel Priest.

Little attended Queensmead School. He went on to study at Manchester Polytechnic (now Manchester Metropolitan University).

== Career ==
=== Early career ===
While at Manchester Polytechnic, he wrote his dissertation about Coronation Street and Tony Warren who became his mentor and insisted the producers gave him a job. After graduating, he was taken on by Granada Television as an archivist, when the previous incumbent of the job, Eric Rosser, left. He has written 11 books, both fiction and non-fiction, about the show and its characters and co-wrote Betty Driver's autobiography.

Little left Granada in 2006 after writing 95 episodes of Coronation Street and introducing the first gay character, Todd Grimshaw. He created the characters Sean Tully, Archie Shuttleworth, Bev Unwin and Eric Gartside who was played by Peter Kay. He created, wrote and produced a 20-part series called Hollyoaks: In the City for Mersey Television. The series was not recommissioned for a second series. He joined the Hollyoaks writing team, writing 12 episodes before moving to New York to work on All My Children.

=== American ventures ===
ABC Daytime hired him to be a creative consultant on All My Children. He worked closely with Brian Frons, Barbara Esensten, James Harmon Brown, Charles Pratt, Jr. and Julie Hanan Carruthers. He was an Associate Head Writer from 14 July 2008 to 2 November 2009.

In 2018, Little was hired as a story consultant on the CBS Daytime soap opera The Young and the Restless, reuniting with Mal Young. Little's first episode aired on 3 December 2018 and last aired on 19 March 2019.

Little, formerly a member of the Writers Guild of America, East, left and maintained financial core status.

=== Back in Britain ===
In 2009, he returned to Coronation Street, writing a further nine episodes. On 2 March 2010, it was confirmed that Little had left Coronation Street and joined its rival EastEnders. In September 2010, his drama The Road to Coronation Street was broadcast on BBC4, telling the story of Coronation Street's conception 50 years earlier, centering on Tony Warren. The drama won Best Single Drama at the 2011 BAFTAs and Royal Television Society and Little won the Best Scriptwriter at the RTS North West Awards. In 2013, Little wrote a comedy pilot Kitten Chic about a psychotic fag hag that aired on Sky Living and rejoined the writing team of Hollyoaks. He rejoined EastEnders in 2013 as part of Dominic Treadwell-Collins' team, receiving acclaim for an episode where Johnny Carter came out to his father Mick, played by Danny Dyer.

=== Reality ===
Little worked as story producer on the first series of ITV2 structured reality show The Only Way Is Essex before helping to cast, set up and story produce all series of E4's BAFTA winning show Made in Chelsea. He has worked as Story Executive on all 19 series and Summer specials. He is also an Executive Producer on ITV2's The Real Housewives of Cheshire.

From 2022 onward, Little has been involved in the production of Netflix reality shows Young, Famous & African and Dubai Bling.

== Personal life ==
Little is gay but married a woman when he was younger. "I'm gay and I got married in a church... to a woman... because I feared being gay in a world that didn't accept me. That was 25 years ago." He has two sons.

Later, Little had a civil partnership that was dissolved in 2014. Little moved to Málaga, Spain in 2023, after his London rent was hiked up.

== Awards and nominations ==
- 2006 - BAFTA nomination - Coronation Street
- 2009 - Emmy nomination - All My Children
- 2010 - Emmy nomination - All My Children
- 2011 - RTS winner Best Single Drama - The Road to Coronation Street
- 2011 - New York Film & TV Festival winner - Best International Programme - The Road to Coronation Street
- 2011 - BAFTA winner: Best Single Drama - The Road to Coronation Street
- 2011 - Broadcast Digital Awards: Best Scripted Program winner - The Road to Coronation Street
- 2011 - RTS North West winner: Best Scriptwriter - The Road to Coronation Street
- 2020 - Emmy nomination - The Young and the Restless
