= Johnny Carter (EastEnders) =

- EastEnders character
- Charlie Suff as Johnny Carter (2026)
- Portrayed by: Sam Strike (2013–2014); Ted Reilly (2016–2018); Charlie Suff (2024–present)
- Duration: 2013–2014, 2016–2018, 2024–present
- First appearance: Episode 4771; 26 December 2013
- Created by: Dominic Treadwell-Collins
- Introduced by: Dominic Treadwell-Collins (2013, 2016); Chris Clenshaw (2024)
In-universe information
- Occupation: Lawyer; Law student; Barman; Chef; Bar manager
- Father: Mick Carter
- Mother: Linda Carter
- Stepmother: Janine Butcher
- Brothers: Lee Carter; Ollie Carter
- Sisters: Nancy Carter
- Half-sisters: Frankie Lewis; Annie Carter
- Grandfathers: Buster Briggs; John Peacock
- Grandmothers: Shirley Carter; Elaine Peacock
- Uncles: Jimbo Wicks; Dean Wicks
- Aunts: Carly Wicks
- Nephews: Michael Carter
- First cousins: Jade Masood
- Other relatives: Stan Carter; Sylvie Carter; Babe Smith; Tina Carter; Zsa Zsa Carter

Johnny Carter is a fictional character from the BBC soap opera EastEnders, portrayed by Charlie Suff. Johnny makes his first appearance in episode 4771, originally broadcast on 26 December 2013. Johnny has been played by three actors since being introduced in 2013. Sam Strike first portrayed the role from 2013 until he exited in 2014, his final appearance on 25 December 2014 via a Skype call on Christmas Day. In February 2016, it was announced that Johnny would return, portrayed by Ted Reilly who made his first appearance on 11 April 2016. Reilly announced his departure from the role in December 2017, making his final on-screen appearance on 29 January 2018. In December 2023, it was announced that the character would be returning, played by Charlie Suff. Johnny returned on 9 February 2024. On 18 August 2026, it was announced that Suff would exit the role.

Johnny's storylines have included a brief romance with Whitney Dean (Shona McGarty) before coming out as gay which his mother Linda (Kellie Bright) initially struggles to accept, his relationship with Gianluca Cavallo (Gabriele Lombardo), supporting Ben Mitchell (Harry Reid) after his boyfriend Paul Coker (Jonny Labey) is murdered in a homophobic attack, being injured in a robbery at The Queen Victoria public house and discovering that his brother Lee (Danny-Boy Hatchard) was responsible, being shot by Ted Murray (Christopher Timothy), helping Linda and "The Six" cover up the murder of Keanu Taylor (Danny Walters), a relationship with Felix Baker (Matthew James Morrison), which ends due to Johnny's affair with Callum Highway (Tony Clay), dating Callum and struggling to get along with Callum's stepdaughter Lexi Pearce (Isabella Brown), and being sexually coerced by Tim Walton (Tom Ratcliffe).

== Creation and development ==
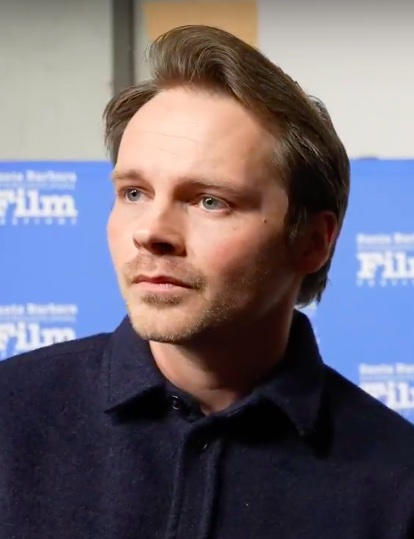
For his portrayal of Johnny, Sam Strike was met with critical praise.

Sam Strike's casting as Johnny was announced on 29 October 2013, on which the actor said: "I'm really excited to be joining EastEnders and the Carter family. They're all really strong characters and I can't wait to see what EastEnders has planned for us all. I've grown up watching Danny [Dyer] and Kellie [Bright], both of whom are lovely, so to be playing their son is kind of surreal." Johnny is described as a 19-year-old "mummy's boy". He is the youngest of three siblings, is a university student and is called "a gentle boy who's happy to let the rest of his family be the centre of attention", though it was said he has a secret that will "place him right at the centre of a family storm". This was the fact that Johnny is gay.

Johnny comes out to Mick in Episode 4778, of which Strike said, "With that scene where Johnny comes out to Mick, I was really nervous the night it aired, because you want it to look convincing but then you want to do justice by the people that have been there and done it. It was a real proving ground for me, because it was the first time I actually had to do any proper drama acting."

On 14 November it was announced that Strike had decided to leave the show as he did not feel that the character was necessary to the current storylines and that he had already filmed his final scenes. His character departed on 23 December 2014 but made a special appearance on 25 December episode.

In February 2016, it was announced that the role of Johnny was being recast and the character would return later in the year, but that the casting process was still ongoing at that point. Later on, it was announced that Ted Reilly would be taking over the role. Reilly's first episode was broadcast on 11 April 2016. It was announced on 19 December 2017 that Reilly had finished filming with the show and would depart "within the next few weeks". A show spokesperson confirmed the news. Reilly later confirmed that it was his choice to leave the serial and said he would miss his on-screen family. On his departure, the actor commented, "It was a really tough decision to leave, but at this stage in my career it's very important to keep being challenged & experience new things!" Reilly made his last appearance on 29 January 2018.

On 5 December 2023, it was announced the character would be returning in 2024, with Suff assuming the role. Johnny's return scenes aired on 9 February 2024.

In August 2026, following the news of Bright's exit, it was announced that Suff would exit the role, with Johnny to also depart "in the coming months". The Sun was the first to report on Suff's exit, with claims that his exit was the result of Bright's decision to exit the role of Linda. Radio Times reported that the "finishing touches" were being put into place for Johnny's departure, but assured the door would be left open for the character to return at a later time. Speaking to the publication in the following month, Suff described Johnny's departure as "gutting", and previewed what he described as a dramatic storyline.

== Storylines ==
=== 2013–2014 ===
Johnny makes his first appearance on 26 December 2013, moving into The Queen Victoria public house with parents, Mick (Danny Dyer) and Linda Carter (Kellie Bright). He soon meets Whitney Dean (Shona McGarty), and his parents tease him about being attractive to women. However, after Danny Pennant (Gary Lucy) compliments Johnny on his looks, Johnny asks if he meant it, leading to them kissing, which his grandmother Shirley Carter (Linda Henry) witnesses.Johnny lets his parents assume he kissed Whitney, though Shirley advises him against this. When Johnny's sister Nancy (Maddy Hill) arrives in Walford, she outs Johnny as gay to her family during an argument. Eventually, Johnny breaks down and comes out to Mick after denying his sexuality previously. They are unaware, however, that Linda has overheard their conversation. Linda finds it extremely difficult to come to terms with Johnny's sexuality, which leads to numerous arguments with Mick and Shirley. Johnny eventually reveals his sexuality to Whitney, who is hurt as she feels that Johnny has been using her. She soon forgives Johnny and even offers for him to move in with her and her family if his relationship with Linda does not improve. Johnny later threatens to leave The Queen Vic, so Mick forces Linda to sort things out. Linda seems to have finally come round to the idea of Johnny being gay, but she later breaks down over the situation. Johnny realises that Linda is not fully accepting of his sexuality when she invites Whitney, who she thinks is pregnant, over and tries to set them up, Johnny feels hurt and betrayed and a huge argument ensues. Mick then tells Linda to fully accept his sexuality or risk losing him forever. Whitney tells Johnny that he needs to get a boyfriend so that everyone can accept it and move on with their lives.

Johnny manages to secure a job as a barman in Sharon Rickman's (Letitia Dean) new bar, The Albert. When Sharon is attacked by two masked intruders, Johnny hides upstairs and later phones for help. His family assumes he scared the intruders away but Johnny is forced to admit he hid upstairs and did nothing. Johnny fails some of his exams and Linda interferes by going to see his tutor behind his back. Furious, Johnny rows with his mother, calling her a "stupid bitch", and decides to leave Walford, ashamed of what he said. Johnny's great-grandfather Stan Carter (Timothy West) takes Linda and Nancy to see him at Stan's unoccupied flat. Johnny and Linda apologise and Linda gives him her blessing to attend Pride London, where he meets Gianluca Cavallo (Gabriele Lombardo). He tells his siblings he has met someone, and Lee encourages him to invite Gianluca to Linda's birthday party. Johnny loses his virginity to Gianluca, and after the party, Linda tells Johnny she approves of Gianluca and he is welcome to come back.

Johnny shows brief interest in Ben Mitchell (Harry Reid) when he is released from prison. Ben has told his father Phil Mitchell (Steve McFadden) that his homosexuality was a phase, but confuses Johnny by flirting with him at times and rejecting him at others. Johnny realises that Ben is desperate to prove himself and criticises him for dating Abi Branning (Lorna Fitzgerald), but Ben continues to deny that he is gay. Ben later tries to kiss Johnny, but he rebukes him. Johnny announces that he is going to go travelling with Gianluca. Initially, Linda finds this hard to accept, but she soon relents, and Johnny leaves with her blessing, after telling Ben to stop denying who he is.

=== 2016–2018 ===
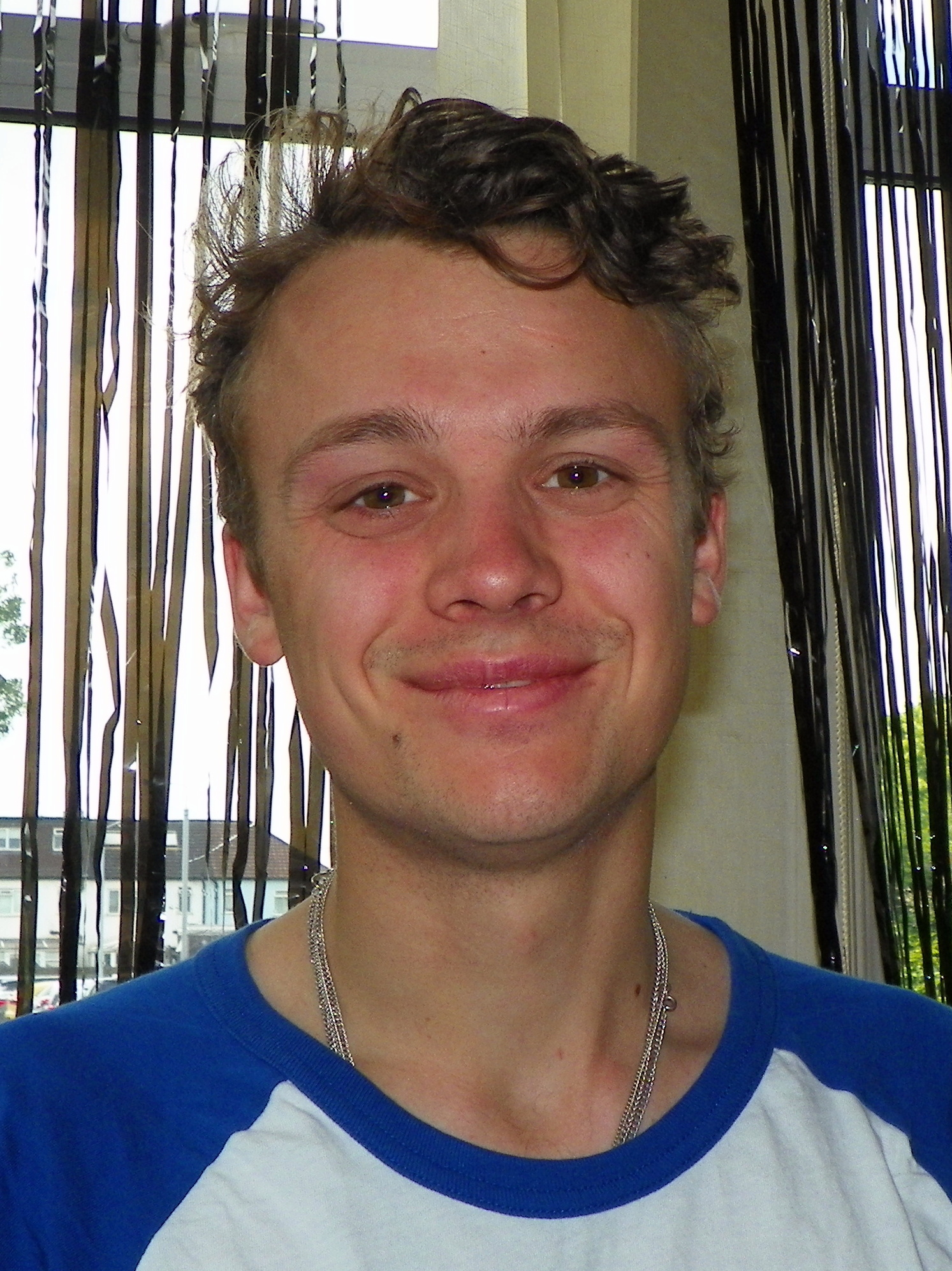
Ted Reilly's casting was announced in February 2016.

Johnny (now played by Ted Reilly) returns amid a family crisis in April 2016. He avoids talking about Gianluca and realises Linda is hiding something from him. During a heart-to-heart talk, he admits he and Gianluca have split up, and Linda tells him she was raped by his uncle Dean Wicks (Matt Di Angelo). Johnny cannot deal with everything that has happened to the family since he left, and tells Mick he blames him for it all. He apologises the next day and persuades Mick to stop blaming Nancy for the accident that has left their brother Ollie Carter with possible brain damage. Johnny decides to not return to Italy and convinces his university tutor to let him take his second year exam. His tutor reluctantly accepts; Johnny takes and passes his exams.

When Ben's boyfriend Paul Coker (Jonny Labey) is murdered in a homophobic attack, Johnny supports Ben and encourages him to tell the police that the crime was motivated by homophobia. Linda worries Johnny is developing feelings for Ben, but he insists he is merely being a good friend. In November Ben, still grieving and feeling rejected by his father, gets drunk and tries to kiss Johnny, but Johnny refuses to take advantage of his vulnerable state.

With Lee due to marry Johnny's close friend Whitney, Johnny discovers Lee has got into debt with a payday loan company. He encourages his brother to come clean, but Lee forces himself to go ahead with the wedding. The Carters then later become victims of a burglary. Johnny attempts to fend off the robbers but is injured in the process, after one of them attacks him with a baseball bat. It is later revealed that Lee was responsible for the burglary and a result Johnny becomes hostile towards him.

After Ben and Jay Brown (Jamie Borthwick) move to their own flat, Johnny attends Ben's their housewarming party, which is also Ben's 21st birthday party. After Abi and Jay both try to set them up, they have a one-night stand after getting drunk. The next day, they both worry that the other wants a relationship but are relieved to realise they just see each other as friends.

Johnny's off-screen life involves his university studies, and in 2017 he completes his Law degree and receives a 2:1. Soon after this, he forms a friendship with older gay neighbour Derek Harkinson (Ian Lavender), after Derek berates Johnny for standing idly by during a homophobic incident. Johnny learns that Derek has a criminal conviction due to having a 20 year old boyfriend when the gay age of consent was still 21. Johnny encourages Derek not to leave the Square after his past incarceration is discovered. Following a gas explosion in Albert Square, Johnny tries to check on Ted Murray (Christopher Timothy) and his wife Joyce (Maggie Steed), but Ted accidentally shoots Johnny after believing him to be a burglar, although Joyce later takes the blame. The ambulance that Linda and Johnny are travelling in is hit by a truck and falls over, killing the paramedic attending to him. Jack Branning (Scott Maslen), who is following in the car behind, manages to get into the ambulance and keep Johnny alive via advice from the ambulance driver until a hospital helicopter arrives. Mick and Linda visit Johnny in hospital where he will make a full recovery. After he is discharged, Johnny writes a letter to the judge in Ted and Joyce's defence, which helps to avoid a conviction.

The Carter family are stunned when they discover that they are being evicted from The Queen Vic thanks to Max Branning (Jake Wood). However, they are later offered a chance to keep the pub when they have to pay £150,000 to retain ownership of the pub. In an attempt to raise the cash, Mick joins Aidan Maguire (Patrick Bergin) in a robbery. However, the stolen money goes missing and Mick becomes the prime suspect due to his desperation to save The Queen Vic. Unbeknown to Aidan, the Carters pawn a stolen ring from the robbery and are able to keep The Queen Vic. Johnny is offered a contract with a law firm in Manchester and on the day of his departure, Aidan tries to intimidate him. Johnny lies that the money came from his ancestor's war medals. Using one of Johnny's school history projects, the Carters are able to fool Aidan into thinking that the money is legitimate. Johnny leaves Walford for Manchester in a taxi cab after bidding farewell to Mick and Linda.

=== 2024–present ===
Johnny (now played by Charlie Suff) returns to Walford in February 2024, after his grandmother Elaine Peacock (Harriet Thorpe) contacts him to help Linda who has been drinking heavily. He is furious when Elaine reveals that Dean is back in Walford. Johnny punches Dean and warns him to stay away from Linda. Whilst drinking, Linda later reveals to Johnny that she murdered Keanu Taylor (Danny Walters) to protect Sharon, and helped bury his body under the floor of Bridge Street café with Sharon, Kathy Cotton (Gillian Taylforth), Stacey Slater (Lacey Turner), Denise Fox (Diane Parish) and Suki Panesar (Balvinder Sopal) (see "The Six"). Johnny agrees to help the women cover up the crime, but informs them that the meat thermometer used to kill Keanu has gone missing. The murder weapon is eventually recovered in April, just as Keanu's body is discovered and Sharon is arrested for the murder. Johnny represents Sharon in her interviews but finds himself stressed when Kathy, Stacey and Suki attempt to use the weapon as leverage against the others. Linda eventually decides to confess, but later reneges on this idea, with Johnny helping the women frame Dean for the murder, resulting in him being arrested and charged for Keanu's murder. Johnny later brings Olly Alexander to The Queen Vic shortly before the Eurovision Song Contest 2024.

Johnny supports Linda during Keanu's funeral in June and convinces police officer and family friend Callum Highway (Tony Clay) from further investigating the crime. Linda becomes stressed when she is repeatedly sent messages by an anonymous source claiming to know what she did on Christmas Day. This is later revealed to be Keanu's half-sister Bernadette Taylor (Clair Norris), working with Dean to expose Sharon for her part in Keanu's death. With Linda, whose false testimony is crucial for Dean's prosecution, refusing to attend her pre-trial interview, Johnny allows her to drink alcohol before going; she soon becomes drunk, and the prosecution barrister removes her from the case. Johnny eventually convinces the barrister to re-instate Linda to the case, but is horrified to discover that Linda is drinking with Bernadette. Enraged, Johnny chastises Linda for continuing to drink and wishes that she had died instead of Mick. Linda then attempts suicide by alcohol poisoning, which Johnny blames on Gina Knight (Francesca Henry); however, after kissing Callum, he realises the error of his ways and apologises to both Linda and Gina.

During Dean's trial, Johnny is horrified when Linda fails to appear in court to testify, having seen Sharon be arrested for contempt of court; he eventually convinces Linda to return the next day to testify with the help of Phil Mitchell (Steve McFadden). Dean's trial collapses when he finally confesses to raping Linda and Johnny advises The Six that the police will most likely re-investigate them; Linda then confesses to the police, which is rejected, and to Bernadette, who then leaves Walford. Johnny informs Elaine of the truth and convinces her to support Linda as she prepares for a potential arrest; however, Linda effectively evades justice when Suki's ex-husband Nish Panesar (Navin Chowdhry) confesses to the crime in order to protect Suki. Johnny is disappointed when Linda relapses again upon Bernadette's return, which is worsened when Nish escapes from prison. Johnny kicks Linda out of The Queen Vic when he realises the negative effect her alcoholism is having on Ollie, and is horrified when she goes missing afterwards. When she returns, Johnny is pleased when she finally agrees to enter rehab. After months in rehab, Linda returns home. Realising that Felix Baker (Matthew James Morrison) is single, Linda attempts to set him up with Johnny. Johnny refuses, but Linda later walks in on Johnny and Felix embracing. Johnny desires a serious relationship, but Felix prefers to remain open. However, after Johnny gives him an ultimatum, Felix agrees to commit to a proper relationship. Their relationship does not last long as Johnny has a one-night stand with Callum Highway (Tony Clay), and Felix leaves Walford after it is revealed. Johnny and Callum continue seeing each other, despite Callum's attempts to be faithful to his husband Ben.

== Reception ==
Strike's portrayal of Johnny was met with critical praise, specifically the scenes where Johnny came out to his father, Mick (Danny Dyer). Both Strike's and Dyer's sensitive performances during this scene were praised. with The Guardian's Paul Flynn referring to his coming out as gay to his dad as "an exceptionally moving scene". On this particular scene, Strike said, "I've had letters and Danny's had letters saying that we'd helped people to come out, and it makes things worth it." Strike's scenes as Johnny coming out to Mick were later nominated for the Spectacular Scene of the Year Award at the 2014 British Soap Awards and won a Media Recognition Award at the 2014 Attitude Awards. For his role as Johnny, Suff was longlisted for "Best Newcomer" at the 2024 Inside Soap Awards.

== See also ==
- List of soap operas with LGBT characters
