= Daniel Priest =

Australian bushranger (1814–1883)

Daniel Priest (1814–1883) was a convict and bushranger in nineteenth century Tasmania. Priest escaped from the penal settlement at Port Arthur and became a bushranger while trying to avoid arrest.

He became known to those he robbed as 'the friendly bushranger' on account of his 'almost unparalleled mildness and kindness towards persons with whom he came into collision in pursuit of his lawless career.' Priest held up settlers at gunpoint but only took what he needed and was never violent.

In 1845, he was eventually caught and, at an appearance before the Police Magistrate, witness George Lucas, who had recently been robbed, claimed the coat and trousers worn by Priest, were his. Priest replied: 'Yes, you're right, they're yours; you have told a very correct yarn; all that you have said is very true.' When the Magistrate then told Priest that they would have to find him some other clothes, Priest answered, 'Just as you please, Sir, it's not as I like now.'

Priest was sentenced to hang, but after the intervention of many members of the public, including three priests and several people who he had robbed, his sentence was commuted to ten years at Norfolk Island.
