= Ted Reilly =

British film and television actor

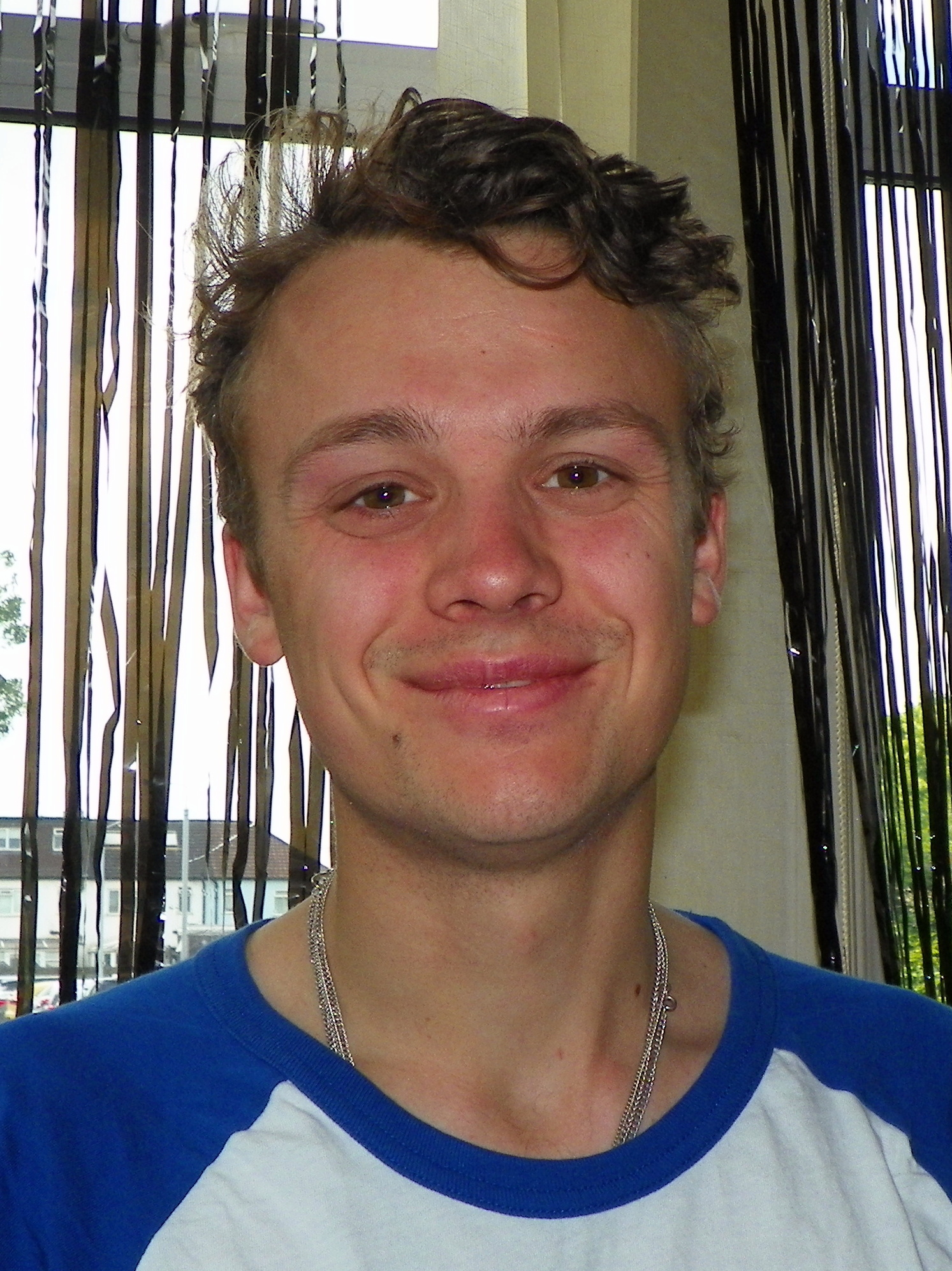
- Reilly in 2016
- Born: 14 September 1991 (age 34); Lambeth, London, England
- Occupation: Actor
- Years active: 2013–present
- Television: EastEnders (2016–2018)

Ted Reilly (born 14 September 1991) is an English actor from London, who is the second actor who played the role of Johnny Carter in EastEnders from 2016 to 2018, because the original actor chose not to return, and the show's producers recast the role. Before that, however, he appeared in popular television programmes, including Casualty, Law & Order: UK, Grantchester and Call the Midwife. Reilly quit EastEnders in December 2017, and his final scenes aired on 29 January 2018.

== Career ==
Reilly made his acting debut during an episode on Casualty as Danni Petrovich in "Life Goes On". He later went on to appear in the short Heart of Nowhere as Dropkick 2. He has also appeared in the first ever episode of television series Suspects as Robbie Hyland in 2014. Later in the year, he appeared in Law & Order: UK as Paul Downing, Playhouse Presents for one episode as Daniel Pettigrew. He also appeared in the short Half Time and Down as Teddy, and in Grantchester as Justin during the first series' fifth episode. In 2016, he appeared as Ian Bulmer for one episode in Call the Midwife and in April made his EastEnders debut before making an appearance in the short Party Party.

Reilly made his debut appearance as Johnny Carter on 11 April 2016. The role was previously portrayed by Sam Strike.

Reilly appears as school boy Henry in LGBT short film Birthday Boy (2021) directed by NFTS alumnus Leo Lebeau.

== Filmography ==
=== Film ===
Year	Title	Role
2013	Heart of Nowhere (short)	Dropkick 2
2014	Half Time and Down (short)	Teddy
2014	Two Seas (short)	Gary
2016	Party Party (short)	Sparks
2021	Birthday Boy (short)	Henry

=== Television ===
Year	Title	Role	Notes
2013	Unknown Heart	William	
2013	Casualty	Danni Petrovich	Series 27, Episode 21: Life Goes On.
2014	Suspects	Robbie Hyland	Series 1, Episode 1.
2014	Law & Order: UK	Paul Downing	Series 8, Episode 2 Safe from Harm.
2014	Playhouse Presents	Daniel Pettigrew	Series 3, Episode 4 Nightshift.
2014	Grantchester	Justin	Series 1, Episode 5.
2016	Hetty Feather	Jem Cotton	1 Episode (Series 2 Episode 3)
2016	Call the Midwife	Ian Bulmer	Series 5, Episode 4.
2016–2018	EastEnders	Johnny Carter	Series regular
