= List of EastEnders two-hander episodes =

EastEnders two-hander episodes are singular episodes of the BBC soap opera EastEnders that feature only two members of the cast for the duration. Scripted like mini-plays, two-hander episodes have become a tradition in EastEnders over the years, dating back to a groundbreaking episode in 1986, which featured publicans Den Watts and Angie Watts. Devoting an entire half an hour of drama to just two characters had previously been unheard of in a bi-weekly serial before this episode aired, but it set a precedent for the programme and it has featured two-handers ever since.

Typically, the episodes feature revelations and major character changes to an important relationship, and intense interactions between two prominent characters. Structuring the episode in this way allows for in-depth focus on a specific character or storyline that would be impossible to achieve in the fast-moving and rapidly cut regular episodes.

Practically, these episodes were originally created for speedy filming purposes, as while the two actors were filming the two-hander, the remaining cast could be filming another episode.

== Two-hander episodes ==
=== Den and Angie Watts (16 October 1986) ===
The first two-hander features Den Watts (Leslie Grantham) and Angie Watts (Anita Dobson) and is structured like a tennis match, with a non-speaking window cleaner forever strolling innocently into the action. The episode was written by Jane Hollowood and directed by Antonia Bird. This episode was watched by 14.0 million viewers in its original broadcast. Writers chose to give Den and Angie a two-hander episode due to their popularity.

Den and Angie's marriage has broken down, and before the episode, Den finally decides to end the marriage and leave Angie for his mistress, Jan Hammond (Jane How). The episode begins with Den trying to talk to Angie to tell her that he wants to leave her and get a divorce but not before Angie tries to continue with a "normal" life in vain; within the opening moments of the episode Angie switches on the washing machine and throughout the back and forth between Angie and Den the audience hears the cycle progress, almost as a soundtrack. The thundering spin cycle often plays alongside Angie or Den screaming and shouting and the gentle wash action plays alongside the more tender moments. Angie stalls but Den persists and explains to her that he wants a clean break from her, their pub, The Queen Victoria, Albert Square and Walford. Den tells Angie that he shall get another pub through a deal with James Willmott-Brown (William Boyde) and Jan would be doing the books. Angie is shocked and feels defeated, but she then reveals that she is terminally ill with only six months to live. Den does not believe her, but Angie explains her story to Den; Angie's hysterical performance eventually convinces him. Den crumbles and promises to stay with her, adding that he will kill Angie if she is lying. Consumed by guilt, Den asks Angie for her forgiveness. As Den leaves Angie alone and takes their dog Roly for a walk, she gives a deranged smile, revealing that she has been lying to Den. Although this is always referred to as a "two hander", in fact another actor also appears in the episode. The window cleaner, who contributes to the dramatic tension by causing the warring couple to move from room to room, was played by Kevin Walsh who, because of qualms about billing at the end of the episode, was only credited onscreen at the end of the omnibus edition broadcast on the Sunday.

=== Dot Cotton and Ethel Skinner (2 July 1987) ===
The second two-hander features old friends Dot Cotton (June Brown) and Ethel Skinner (Gretchen Franklin) babysitting Vicki Fowler (Emma Herry) one rainy afternoon. This episode centres around nostalgia and growing old and was scripted to show the sadness behind the often comical characters of Dot and Ethel. The episode was written by Charlie Humphreys and directed by Mike Gibbon, a future producer of the show.

While baby Vicki sleeps, Dot and Ethel reminisce about their lives during World War II and share secrets from their girlhoods. During the war Ethel was 17 and remained in London where she witnessed the death of her family, who were killed by a German doodlebug. Dot was evacuated to Wales when she was three years old and stayed with a couple she called Auntie Gwen and Uncle Will, who wanted to adopt her. Dot later confesses that she had an abortion soon after she married Charlie Cotton (Christopher Hancock) because he told her he would leave her if she kept the baby. This causes a furious Dr. Harold Legg (Leonard Fenton) to punch Charlie on the nose in The Queen Victoria public house. Towards the end of the episode Dot goes out to the shop for a loaf bread and some fig rolls. When she returns Ethel is asleep and Dot thinks she has died and begins weeping and reciting the Lord's Prayer. When Ethel rouses, Dot panics and Ethel has to slap her out of it. Ethel then tearfully reminisces about her dead husband William and the past. As the episode ends, Dot and Ethel tend to Vicki while singing.

=== Sharon Watts and Michelle Fowler (4 April 1989) ===
The third two-hander features the best friends Sharon Watts (Letitia Dean) and Michelle Fowler (Susan Tully). In the aftermath of Sharon's adoptive father, Den Watts' (Leslie Grantham) apparent death, the two friends start an evening at home with a bottle of wine and their memories. This episode was written by Tony McHale and directed by Mike Gibbon.

After Den's supposed murder, Sharon begins to speculate about the identity of the mysterious woman who had been seen with him prior to his death. When Sharon tells Michelle that she felt that she and her daughter Vicki Fowler (Samantha Leigh Martin) were now her family, Michelle blurts out a secret that she has been keeping for over three years – that Den is Vicki's father and that she is the mystery woman who was seen with Den before his death. Michelle thought Sharon would be comforted to know that she is Vicki's sister, and that a part of Den lives on in Vicki. However, Sharon takes the news very badly, feeling hurt, angry and deceived. After slapping Michelle and having an emotional showdown, Sharon leaves their flat wishing that Michelle had never told her.

In 2024, Radio Times placed the episode as their fifth best EastEnders two-hander, describing Michelle's secret as "one of the best-kept secrets in soap history".

=== Grant and Phil Mitchell (15 November 1994) ===
This episode features the Mitchell brothers, Phil Mitchell (Steve McFadden) and Grant Mitchell (Ross Kemp). Following Grant's discovery that Phil had slept with his wife, Sharon Mitchell (Letitia Dean), Grant has beaten Phil so badly that he is hospitalised with a dangerous blood clot to the brain. Phil is rushed into surgery, and the clot is removed. As Grant sits with his brother, the two make a pact and promise to never let a woman come between them again.

As Phil awakes from his surgery he finds his brother sleeping next to him, holding his hand. Grant awakes and instantly gets defensive claiming that he is only there because their friend Nigel Bates (Paul Bradley) had persuaded him. As the two start talking Grant begins to reminisce about the past when a girl he was dating came onto Phil, and Phil told him. Grant asks Phil if this is the situation with Sharon; Phil denies this, but Grant continues to call Sharon a slut, blaming her for the whole affair. Phil attempts to dispute this, but his protests fall on deaf ears. Grant proceeds to ask Phil how easy Sharon was to seduce, but Phil is hesitant to answer. After continual pestering, Phil becomes agitated and tells Grant that Sharon is easy and that he didn't even have to get out of first gear.

They then begin to talk about their relationship, how people used to hate them because they were so close and could do anything together and that this was always Sharon's problem. After they reminisce about their many conquests with women, Grant returns to the topic of Sharon, revealing that he plans to crush her "like a table tennis ball" and make her pay for what she's done. Phil warns him not to do anything stupid, which angers Grant, who accuses Phil of sticking up for Sharon, though Phil assures him he is merely concerned for his welfare. He persuades Grant that if the two of them do not stick together, Grant will end up back in prison. He promises Grant that he will do anything for him and as Grant begins to weep, Phil promises that from now on, it will be just the two of them.

=== Pat Evans and Peggy Mitchell (27 October 1998) ===
This episode features Pat Evans (Pam St Clement) and Peggy Mitchell (Barbara Windsor). Peggy is on the warpath after being told about a fabricated affair between her fiancé Frank (Mike Reid) and his ex-wife Pat. However, Pat has other concerns, namely that her husband, Roy Evans (Tony Caunter), has driven off like a suicidal maniac nearly hitting her in the process. As Frank speeds off after Roy, Pat and Peggy wait it out in the Evans household and make clear their feelings towards each other.

Pat is in shock about Roy nearly hitting her, but convinces herself that he merely didn't see her. Peggy is unsure and comments that running her down is cheaper than divorce, and suggests that Roy has also found out about her affair. Pat insists that nothing has happened between her and Frank, but Peggy requires a lot of convincing, and they both trade insults with each other. Pat tells Peggy that Frank talked about her a lot, but Peggy cannot accept this and when Pat leaves the room for a bath, Peggy begins to sob. Pat eventually joins her and Peggy accuses her of still loving Frank. Pat does not deny this, but claims she has moved on and knows when to give up on something. Peggy is convinced that Frank has feelings for Pat too.

After opening a bottle of wine Pat begin to feel sorry for herself, saying that she is cursed and turns rich, happy men into disasters – Roy is broke and impotent, whereas Frank, who has spent a couple of years away from her, has returned to his old virile self. Peggy is amazed to discover that Roy is impotent and Pat is quick to point out that sex is not important and she is happy to have finally found a man who wants her to settle down.

After the police arrive to inform Pat that their search for Roy has been fruitless, Peggy pesters them for information, which leads her to suspect that Roy has come to harm. Now feeling more sympathetic, Peggy goes to converse with Pat, but the atmosphere soon becomes frosty as each begins to recount their wonderful times with Frank. Pat further antagonizes Peggy by saying that she could have slept with Frank if she'd wanted to the night before, as he still fancied her and the least encouragement would have sufficed. The argument continues, with Pat branding Peggy "mutton dressed as lamb" and Peggy blaming Pat's appearance for Roy's impotence. Their rowing finally descends into violence as both women throw wine glasses at each other and begin to fight, with Peggy flipping kitchen table to clear the way to attack Pat. The episode ends with Pat slapping Peggy, saying "You bitch!" and Peggy slapping Pat right back, exclaiming "You cow!", right as the doorbell rings.

=== Roy Evans and Frank Butcher (29 October 1998) ===
Occurring simultaneously to the previous two-hander featuring Pat Evans (Pam St Clement) and Peggy Mitchell (Barbara Windsor), this episode features Roy Evans (Tony Caunter) and Frank Butcher (Mike Reid). After Roy speeds off, nearly hitting Pat with his car, Frank follows him and forces him to rethink a drastic decision.

Frank follows Roy's car as he speeds off extremely erratically. Eventually, Roy turns into a multi-storey car park, drives to the top and crashes the car into some rubble. He then makes his way to the roof, and stands on the edge contemplating suicide. Frank follows him and attempts to persuade him to get down, saying that he should think about his family, who will blame themselves, and about Pat, who believes that Roy has tried to kill her earlier. Roy claims that he didn't see her, but adds that he feels hopeless and has lost everything, so there is no point living. Frank points out that he has a family who loves him and money is not important. Frank eventually persuades Roy to come down to talk, promising that if he feels the same afterwards, he will bring him back and allow him to commit suicide. Roy agrees and the two go to a strip club and order brandy. Roy continues to explain the reason for his depression; he has been conned in a car deal and is facing bankruptcy. Frank tells Roy that they have more in common than he might think, as he once tried to commit suicide too, was left bankrupt and made the mistake of not going back to Pat, but that for Roy it is not too late.

Roy feels that Pat is still in love with Frank, and accidentally lets slip about his impotency, which only humiliates him further. Frank is understanding and promises to not tell anyone, and he in turn shares a story with Roy, relaying that he had fathered a child with a young girl he met during his breakdown, and that no one else knew. Roy is comforted to know that Frank has skeletons in his closet too, and eventually agrees to return home. Frank drives them back, they ring the bell at the Evanses, just as Peggy and Pat's fight is in full flow. Pat is thrilled to see Roy, while Peggy is little less thrilled to see Frank, so he asks her if they are still engaged. She responds "Just".

=== Matthew Rose and Steve Owen (3 February 2000) ===
This episode features Steve Owen (Martin Kemp) and Matthew Rose (Joe Absolom). Steve has let Matthew serve time in prison for Saskia Duncan's (Deborah Sheridan-Taylor) murder. Upon his release Matthew comes to Walford looking for revenge. 19.8 million viewers watched this episode.

When Matthew turns up at e20 nightclub, Steve is shocked by his visible transformation and can see that Matthew is seeking revenge. Matthew produces a video – he had rigged Steve's flat with booby traps and Steve knew it was only a matter of time before his sister Jackie Owen (Race Davies) arrived home to trigger them. Matthew demands £10,000. Steve attempts to gain the upper hand by pulling his gun from the safe, but Matthew is one step ahead and has already removed the bullets. As they struggle, Matthew grabs a bottle and knocks Steve unconscious. He then binds and ties him to the chair.

When Steve comes to, he attempts to use a piece of smashed bottle to free himself, and manages to grab hold of the gun Matthew was waving in his face. He demands that Matthew remove the booby traps from his flat. However, Matthew stops Steve in his tracks by revealing that he has killed Saskia's sister, Claudia (Romla Walker), and framed him for the deed, just as Steve had done to him. Steve buckles and falls to the floor, unable to take in what is happening. He begins to beg and cry, while Matthew splatters petrol around the room, removing a zippo lighter from his pocket. As he lights the lighter and drops it to the floor, Steve is gripped with fear. However, he soon realises that there is no fire or smoke, and that Matthew had used water instead of petrol and had invented the whole scenario to belittle him and watch him beg for mercy.

=== Ricky Butcher and Phil Mitchell (20 April 2000) ===
This episode features Ricky Butcher (Sid Owen) and his long-time employer Phil Mitchell (Steve McFadden). After losing his wife Bianca Jackson (Patsy Palmer); son Liam (Jack & Tom Godolphin); and finally his mind, Ricky says an emotional farewell to Albert Square – while Phil tries to talk him out of leaving.

Ricky speeds out of Walford in his car and is involved in an accident. Phil goes after him and passes the police retrieving the wreck of Ricky's car. They tell him to go to the police station. Phil arrives and Ricky appears – he was caught over the limit doing 90 miles per hour (140 km/h) when he crashed.

Ricky is furious with Phil for allowing him to work on faulty motors at The Arches, and is even more annoyed when he discovers that the car he has totalled was stolen. Ricky threatens to go back to the station to tell the police everything. Phil forces him to get into the car, but while being driven away, he tells Phil that he is not going home, and starts fighting with Phil in order to get him to stop. The car swerves dangerously and Phil is forced to stop at the next service station.

Phil attempts to explain the situation with the car-scam, saying that he only got involved to bail Roy Evans (Tony Caunter) out and that it was just a favour. Ricky is furious that he could have been jailed for helping Phil. Ricky feels that there is nothing to go back to Walford for. He has lost his wife and son and is devastated that Bianca is seeing another man. Ricky is also hurt because he had trusted Phil – he was the only thing that held him together over the last few weeks, but now he can no longer trust him. As he goes to leave, Phil chases him and tries to stop him from leaving. However, Ricky refuses to let Phil push him around and reveals that he had purposefully driven his car into the back of the truck. Phil tries to explain that he too has lost his family and has managed to turn his life around, and that Ricky can do the same. Phil tries to make Ricky think of the ramifications of his departure – Pat would dump Roy, Frank would go mad and run away again, and Phil would be dumped in it with the police. Ricky does not care and as he begins to walk off, Phil shouts after him that everyone needs him to stay, and that he is Ricky's friend and was there for him when he found out his unborn baby, who was named Natasha, had spina bifida. The memory stirs up buried emotions in Ricky, and he bursts into tears as Phil embraces him.

As dawn begins to break, Phil tries to coerce Ricky home by offering him partnership in The Arches. He also promises to take the rap for the faulty motor that Ricky was driving and to sort out his nemesis Dan Sullivan (Craig Fairbrass) for him. Phil apologizes for all the things he has done to Ricky in the past, but wants the chance to make it up to him and turn things around. Ricky begrudgingly accepts, but when Phil leaves briefly to make a phone call, Ricky decides that he cannot return to Walford. While Phil's back is turned, he asks a lorry driver for a lift and departs.

=== Kat and Zoe Slater (2 October 2001) ===
This episode features Kat Slater (Jessie Wallace) and her daughter Zoe Slater (Michelle Ryan), who up until this moment has lived her life thinking that Kat is her sister. In the previous episode, Zoe had announced that she is leaving Walford to live with her uncle, Harry Slater (Michael Elphick), in Spain, but Kat is adamant that she will not. A screaming row in the street ensues and Zoe shouts "You can't tell me what to do, you ain't my mother!", to which Kat's desperate reply is, "Yes I am!". 16.9 million viewers tuned in for this episode.

This episode begins with Zoe still reeling from Kat's outburst. Back at the Slaters', Zoe demands to know what Kat meant. Kat tries to take back what she said, but after continuous pestering, she finally relents and admits that what she said was the truth. This devastates Zoe, and she locks herself in her room distraught, while Kat sits outside and begins to explain the reason for her deception. She had fallen pregnant when she was 13, and her parents, disappointed and ashamed, forced her to hand Zoe over to them at birth. They proceeded to bring her up as their own child. Kat relays her heartache at having to watch her own child being brought up by her parents, and the anxiety she felt at having to pretend that she was her sister for her whole life. The lies and deception are too much for Zoe, and when she discovers that Kat had wanted to abort her, the two lash out at each other in fury.

The news makes Zoe all the more determined to live with her uncle Harry in Spain, and upon hearing this, Kat drops her second bombshell – she cannot go live with Harry because he is her father. Kat's uncle had sexually abused her as a child, leaving her pregnant with Zoe. This means that Zoe's father is simultaneously her great-uncle.

=== Sonia Jackson and Dot Branning (9 May 2002) ===
This episode features Sonia Jackson (Natalie Cassidy) and her step-grandmother Dot Branning (June Brown). Sonia has kidnapped the daughter she had given up for adoption, Rebecca, and is keeping her hidden away at the Brannings'. Dot tries to reason with Sonia and shares a secret of her own.

With Rebecca asleep upstairs, Sonia ransacks the house for money in order to make her getaway. Dot frantically knocks at the door, shouting that Rebecca's adoptive parents, Neil (Robin Sneller) and Sue Miller (Victoria Willing), were going to call the police unless Sonia lets her in. Sonia tries to deny Rebecca is there, but Dot knows otherwise and makes it clear that she is there to retrieve the baby for the Millers. Sonia becomes distressed by this, arguing that as she is Rebecca's mother she can look after her. The Millers have given Dot a deadline of 15 minutes to persuade Sonia to surrender Rebecca or they will involve the police.

Sonia tries to explain herself. The Millers had planned to take Rebecca away without granting her a last visit. She is also upset at how much her baby has changed since she was born and she had decided that she wanted her back. Dot argues that she could not change her mind now that Rebecca had been adopted and she no longer has any rights as her mother. When Dot instructs Sonia to take Rebecca outside, Sonia threatens to abscond with the baby. She begs Dot to stall the police so she can escape via the back door and is furious when Dot refuses. Dot proceeds to point out that Sonia had missed out on 18 months of Rebecca's life and that she hardly knows her daughter now. Despite Sonia's pleas, Dot refuses to help her – and threatens to call the police herself if the kidnapping continues.

Sonia becomes inconsolable. Dot tries to reassure her that everything will be alright, she just needs some inner strength. Sonia becomes angry with Dot for living her life by the Bible and Dot is mortified as Sonia throws the holy book across the room. Sonia wonders why Dot was so willing to help her criminal son Nick (John Altman), but will not help her. Dot explains that she helped Nick because she had something to make up for; she had an abortion when she was 21 years old. Her husband Charlie Cotton (Christopher Hancock) had forced her to terminate the pregnancy against her wishes. Dot describes how guilty she felt after the abortion. She thought she had put it all behind her until the christening gown was found buried in the garden of Mark Fowler's (Todd Carty) house. She wishes she had kept the baby, and is now left feeling cold and empty. Sonia wonders whether she should have been a single mother like her own mother Carol Jackson (Lindsey Coulson). She relays that Carol is furious about the adoption, but Dot reassures her that Rebecca will have a good life with the Millers.

Just as the Millers decide to call the police, Rebecca begins to cry. When Sonia is unable to console her, she finally realises that it is time to give her up. Tearfully, she passes Rebecca over to her relieved parents.

=== Phil Mitchell and Sharon Watts (5 September 2002) ===
This episode features the ex-lovers Phil Mitchell (Steve McFadden) and Sharon Watts (Letitia Dean). Sharon and Phil have a heart to heart about their troubled pasts. They lay ghosts to rest and agree to move on with their lives.

Sharon and Phil are simultaneously having problems in their relationships. Sharon has fallen out with Tom Banks (Colm Ó Maonlaí), due to malicious stirring from his ex-wife Sadie Banks (Isobel Middleton), and Phil has given Lisa Fowler (Lucy Benjamin) an ultimatum – she is to leave her husband Mark Fowler (Todd Carty) before the day was over. As Phil waits for Lisa to arrive in the middle of the night, he hears a knock at the door of The Queen Victoria public house. He opens the door expecting to find Lisa, but finds Sharon instead.

Sharon declares that she and Tom are over. Phil accuses her of being stroppy and spoiled, and she retaliates by accusing him of using Lisa to get his hands on their daughter, Louise Mitchell (Rachel Cox). The ex-lovers begin drinking and flirting and talk about their past relationship. As they talk, Phil relaxes and opens up about his father. Phil relays how he idolised his father, Eric (George Russo) but that everything changed when he saw how badly he treated his mother. He admits that his deepest wish is to be a good father and expresses his sorrow that his two children are living with other men. Phil begins to shake with emotion as he recalls the beatings he received from his father, while his brother Grant (Ross Kemp) could do no wrong. After one horrific Christmas, Phil vowed to run away and he still carries the note he was going to leave his parents. He never did run away, but the violence continued until he was big enough to fight back. Sharon reveals that she also had issues with her parents. She loved them both, but was caught in the middle of their volatile marriage. After they rowed, they used to compete with each other for her affections.

Sharon then realises that they both have to stop living in the past. She decides to sell her share in The Queen Vic as it reminds her of her parents and Grant. Phil agrees to buy her out. Sharon then urges Phil to put his troubled relationship with his father behind him. Their heart to heart helps her to realise that she wants to make a go of things with Tom. As Sharon leaves, Phil takes the note that he wrote when he was a boy out of his pocket. He sets it on fire to signify that it is time for him to move on as well.

=== Little Mo and Trevor Morgan (31 October 2002) ===
This episode features Little Mo Morgan (Kacey Ainsworth) and her abusive husband Trevor Morgan (Alex Ferns). It is the night of Little Mo and Billy Mitchell's (Perry Fenwick) engagement party. Trevor snatches Little Mo from the party at Angie's Den and imprisons her in the Slater house. To make matters worse, Trevor's baby son Sean is his other hostage.

Trevor has imprisoned Little Mo in the Slater house. He calls her stupid for believing he would ever grant her a divorce. Ominously, he reminds her of their marriage vows – including "'til death us do part". Trevor begins to weep as he admits he is totally obsessed with Little Mo. He is furious that she has been unfaithful to him with Billy and reminds her that she will always be his. Little Mo is disgusted and wonders how Trevor has ended up in such a pitiful state. The early years of their marriage had been happy – so why did Trevor start beating her? He explains that he could not stand sharing her and resented the time she spent caring for her sick mother, Viv (Debi Gibson). He never liked Viv, and was glad when she died. Trevor rages that it is not enough for him to be part of her family, he wants to be all of it.

Trevor then turns violent, pushing Little Mo against the wall and reminding her that he would kill her if she ever slept with another man. Terrified, Little Mo tries to escape but finds that all the doors are locked. She runs upstairs in a panic, but Trevor follows and throws her to the ground saying that she will never hurt him again. Half-crazed with anger, Trevor barks questions at Little Mo, forcing her to admit that it was morally wrong for her, as his wife, to sleep with another man. He claims that Billy could not possibly love her like he did. His questions take on an intimate nature and as he makes a move towards Little Mo, she recoils in fear. Trevor then declares there is no time for that, he has other plans for her. After Trevor calmly leaves the room, Little Mo follows to find Trevor pouring petrol on the stairs and she suddenly hears baby Sean crying upstairs. Out of desperation, Little Mo claims that she still loves Trevor and she had never wanted a divorce. Thinking fast, she blames Billy for turning her against him. She tears off her engagement ring and throws it away. Trevor slumps to the ground, eager to believe that she still loves him. Little Mo beckons him and they embrace. As she cradles him in her arms he sobs that he never meant to hurt her.

Little Mo suggests they go away together, but that she first needed to return Sean to his mother. When Trevor tries to get romantic, Little Mo shrieks and shakes him off. Realising that he is being fooled, Trevor turns violent, threatening to beat her again. Little Mo freezes with fear, but seeing Billy's ring on the carpet gives her courage. She stares at Trevor and proclaims that she is not frightened of him anymore. She tells him that she can see him for what he is – a coward and a bully. Shocked at her defiance, Trevor whispers that she should be scared, but Little Mo is defiant and tells him that he does not have the guts to go through with his threat. She lights a match, forcing an alarmed Trevor to grab it from her. In his haste the match falls to the floor and flames begin to fill the room. Trevor is killed, though Little Mo and the baby survive.

=== Lisa Fowler and Phil Mitchell (27 March 2003) ===
This episode features Lisa Fowler (Lucy Benjamin) and her ex-boyfriend Phil Mitchell (Steve McFadden) in flashbacks to October 2002 while Phil recounts the events to Kate Morton (Jill Halfpenny). After Lisa abducts Phil's daughter and flees to Portugal, Phil tracks her down and is adamant that he is returning to Walford with his daughter. Phil had been suspected of killing Lisa and had her blood on his jacket and had burned her passport when he returned the UK. Kate is eager to get the truth and asks outright if Phil had killed Lisa.

After fleeing from Phil, Lisa is trapped at the edge of a cliff grasping their daughter, Louise Mitchell (Rachel Cox). Phil implores her to move away from the cliff edge, but Lisa is terrified and yells at Phil to get away from her. Phil steps back and urges Lisa to consider Louise's safety and slowly, Lisa moves away from the edge.

Lisa sees a man walking his dog and shouts in vain for help. Her yelling makes Louise cry and Lisa tries to calm her with a lullaby. Phil is biding his time and refuses to leave without Louise. Lisa finally begins to calm down, so Phil leads to her to an abandoned cottage to talk. As they settle inside, Phil remarks how beautiful his daughter is, and pays the same compliment to Lisa. He tells Lisa that he misses them both so much. Lisa is suspicious, but after continual pressure she allows Phil to hold Louise.

Phil tries to persuade Lisa that children need their fathers, and while Lisa admits that she misses her own father, she insists that neither of them are going back with Phil. Phil tries to keep her talking, he questions her about her father. Lisa confesses that she has a recurring dream involving her dad. As she recalls the dream, she becomes highly distraught and informs him that it involves coffins and babies. Phil finds this disturbing and does his best to convince Lisa that she is unwell. He offers to arrange the professional help that she obviously needs, but Lisa accuses Phil of trying to trap her into returning to England. Phil immediately gets defensive, he continues his mind games and manages to make Lisa consider that a life in Portugal, with an unskilled, jobless mother is not appropriate for their daughter. Phil fires question after question at Lisa, and the continual probing begins to baffle Lisa. As he sees it, she has no money and no plans. It is not enough to merely love her daughter if she cannot provide for her. He tells her that babies need stability and their first year is hugely important. Lisa had moved from man to man, and from one place to another in that time. Distressed, Lisa puts her hands over her ears, while Phil continues to rant that she is not fit to look after a dog, let alone a baby. He declares that Lisa is mentally unstable and Louise is not safe with her. Phil urges Lisa to do what is best for Louise.

Exhausted by Phil's personal attacks, Lisa falls quiet. Phil then calmly states that if she tries to stop him taking Louise, he will have her committed. Lisa protests that the only mad thing she has ever done is get involved with him, but Phil proceeds to plants doubts in her mind. He reminds her that she shot him and left him for dead and asks if that was how a sane person behaves. Lisa is visibly distressed and shaking. Sensing that the moment is right, Phil orders her to fetch Louise and hand her over to him. Bewildered, Lisa obeys him. He then announces that it will be best if Lisa does not ever try to return to Walford. He is prepared to reveal all about the shooting if she does.

Lisa staggers outside in confusion and grief. Phil ignores her howls of anguish and walks away with Louise while Lisa stares over the edge of the cliff.

=== Den and Sharon Watts (30 September 2003) ===
This episode reunites Den Watts (Leslie Grantham) with his adoptive daughter Sharon Watts (Letitia Dean), after she has spent 14 years thinking that he was dead. Sharon has the shock of her life when her father emerges from the shadows, muttering "Hello, Princess!". Sharon cannot believe that her father is still alive. Den does his best to explain where he has been, but Sharon is torn between delight and anger.

Sharon touches Den, dumbstruck to see her dad after all these years, but before she has a chance to take it in she begins to feel nauseous and runs to the toilet to be violently sick. Upon her return, Den proceeds to try to explain himself. Sharon stares in disbelief and wants to know how he could let her think that he was dead all this time. As emotions begin to run high, Sharon reveals that she has never stopped grieving for him. Den explains that he could not take the risk in contacting her, or they would have both been in danger. Den only felt safe to return to Walford after hearing that Jack Dalton (Hywel Bennett) had died; Dalton was a local gangland boss and leader of the square's criminal organization known as "The Firm", which was responsible for the events of Den's attempted murder and presumed death back 14 years ago. Den apologizes to Sharon for never having the guts to get in touch. Sharon sobs as she recalls the last conversation she ever had with him. She washed her hands of him, and the next thing she knew he was dead. She had regretted her harsh words ever since, she thought he'd died thinking that she hated him. Sharon confesses that she'd made a mess of her life. Things would have been easier if he'd been around. Just his voice on the end of the phone would have helped. Den has tears in his eyes as he hugs Sharon.

As the two begin to bond, Den brings the conversation around to his first wife and Sharon's adoptive mother, Angie Watts (Anita Dobson) and offends Sharon by referring to her as a "barmy old lush". Sharon announces that Angie has died, which Den did not even know. Furious, Sharon then decides it is too late for Den to make amends, and yells at him to leave her alone. Den does as she wishes and wanders through the Square, before breaking into The Queen Vic, the pub he used to own. Den surveys the pub and Sharon follows him inside. They drink a toast to Angie and Sharon reveals how she nursed her mum during the painful final days of her fatal illness. Den reflects that he had some good times in the pub, but Sharon cannot remember many good times – she just recalls her parents' furious rows. She mentions how she once ran it with Grant Mitchell (Ross Kemp), whom Den has never even heard of. Sharon then remembers that she has an axe to grind with her father, for getting her best friend Michelle Fowler (Susan Tully) pregnant when she was only 16. Den tries to explain what happened between him and Michelle, but Sharon is furious with him for cheating on her mother and blames him for sending her to an early grave.

Sharon decides that she is not going to allow Den to ruin her life again. Den tries to calm her, but Sharon insists that she doesn't need him – before then going on to claim that her sister Vicki Fowler (Scarlett Johnson) and their half-brother, Dennis Rickman (Nigel Harman), don't need their father either. Den instantly assumes that Dennis is Sharon's boyfriend and argues with her that he is not important. This prompts Sharon to reveal that he is not her boyfriend, Dennis is his son. Den becomes surprised as the episode ends.

=== Kat and Alfie Moon (25 May 2004) ===
This episode features Kat Moon (Jessie Wallace) and Alfie Moon (Shane Richie). Alfie has been given a video of Andy Hunter (Michael Higgs) sleeping with his wife, Kat. Alfie owes Andy money and when he cannot pay him back, Andy threatens his safety. Kat sleeps with Andy as a trade for her husband's life, but Alfie cannot accept her excuses.

The episode begins with a jovial Kat returning home, but her mood soon changes after seeing that Andy had filmed their sordid liaison and maliciously given it to Alfie to watch. Alfie is in pieces and cannot bear to look at his wife. As Kat pleads with Alfie to listen to her explanation, he refuses, so Kat screams that she did it all for him. Alfie is disgusted and calls her a cheap little slapper. Hurt, Kat slaps Alfie and he slaps her in return, leaving Kat stunned that he could do such a thing.

As it all sinks in, Alfie breaks down in tears, while Kat desperately tries to protest that Andy tricked her. Alfie can only laugh at her feeble excuse. She tells him that she did it to protect him and because she loves him, but Alfie feels hurt and betrayed. He suggests that she go back to Andy, as he does not want her anywhere near him. Through his tears and anguish Alfie reveals the guilt he has always carried about his parents' death in a car crash and how he blames himself for not fixing something his dad asked him to. Now he cannot live with the thought that his negligence has ruined things again. He tells Kat that their marriage is over and Kat has no choice but to pack her bags. As she is about to go, Alfie questions her more about her motives and Kat tries to make him realise that Andy's behaviour is all about revenge and that they can get past this and stay together. As Alfie continues to reject her, Kat turns on him and brings up her past sexual abuse at the hands of her uncle Harry Slater (Michael Elphick) and likens it to her affair with Andy. Sobbing, she makes one last attempt to change his mind and asks him to give her a cuddle. However, Alfie's pride does not let him take her back and he shows her the door.

As Kat leaves The Queen Vic in tears she hears the door open and sees Alfie there. She holds out her hand and he takes it. They agree that it will be tough, but decide to try to find a way to work things out.

=== Den Watts and Dot Branning (26 August 2004) ===
This episode features long-time neighbours, Den Watts (Leslie Grantham) and Dot Branning (June Brown). Den's wife has left him following his affair, and his relationship with his son is in tatters after he propositions his son's girlfriend. Meanwhile, Dot is arguing with her husband, Jim Branning (John Bardon) and is very reluctant to tell him about her secret cancer illness. Den and Dot are forced to examine their relationships with others.

Late one evening Den spots some youths vandalising the launderette. After seeing off the thugs, Dot emerges from the back room and Den can see that she has been crying.

Dot begins to engage Den in conversation about his wife Chrissie Watts (Tracy-Ann Oberman) and how he feels now that she has left him. Den's response is blasé, which angers Dot and she accuses him of putting up a front. Dot chastises Den for his demeanour and points out that he cannot face up to his own guilt. She tells him that he treats his friends and family appallingly and when he has heard enough and turns to leave, he finds that Dot has locked him in and refuses to give him the keys. As Den is forced to continue the conversation Dot pesters him more about Chrissie and threatens to haunt him if he does not plead Chrissie for forgiveness.

Eventually, Dot informs Den that she is dying and he is shocked to hear that she has kidney cancer. However Dot becomes cagey when Den quizzes her about her illness. He wants her to have the best care possible and even offers to pay for it, but Dot rejects his help – she has chosen not to have her cancer treated. She wants to face death with dignity and begs Den to keep her secret quiet as even her husband, Jim, does not know she is suffering. Den is not convinced by Dot's motives for keeping her illness from Jim, but she believes that she is acting in his best interests. Den insists that Dot's deceit will destroy her marriage and tells her to open up to Jim. Den then slyly tells her that if she does not come clean with Jim, she cannot take the moral high ground next time he messes up. They both decide that they needed to sort their marriages out.

When Jim arrives to collect Dot, Den explains that she was sorting him out and squeezes Dot's hand tenderly before leaving. At home, Den apologises to his son and heeding Dot's advice, he bites the bullet and calls Chrissie. Meanwhile, Dot takes Den's advice and decides that it is time to come clean to Jim.

=== Martin and Sonia Fowler (5 January 2007) ===
Following the death of his mother Pauline Fowler (Wendy Richard), Martin Fowler (James Alexandrou) confronts Sonia Fowler (Natalie Cassidy) about her admission that she killed Pauline. As Martin attacks Joe Macer (Ray Brooks), believing he killed his mother, Sonia confesses it was she who had the altercation with Pauline. Sonia maintains that she issued Pauline a slight tap to the face and that Pauline was fine after their altercation but Martin gets progressively more angry. As Sonia tries to explain the circumstances surrounding her hitting Pauline, Martin refuses to believe her or accept her apologies. Believing Sonia to be guilty of murder, Martin calls the police and takes their daughter Rebecca (Jade Sharif) home, telling Sonia she won't be seeing her daughter again. The police arrive and Sonia is arrested as the residents of Walford look on.

In 2024, Radio Times placed the episode as their twentieth best EastEnders two-hander, describing some scenes as "distressing".

=== Max and Stacey Branning (26 March 2010) ===
Following Stacey Branning's (Lacey Turner) confession to her father-in-law Max Branning (Jake Wood) that she murdered Archie Mitchell (Larry Lamb) (see Who Killed Archie?), the two characters were featured in a two-hander episode on 26 March 2010. The killer was kept a secret from all the cast until 30 minutes before a live episode was broadcast on 19 February 2010, meaning that the script for the two-hander episode, written by Simon Ashdown, could not be released until after the broadcast, though later episodes had already been completed. The cast had been told there was a special episode coming up, but that it would actually feature three characters, one being Archie's murderer. Wood described Ashdown's script as "amazing", saying that Ashdown knew the characters inside out, and hoped he could do the script justice. Wood and Turner were given three days to rehearse. One 19-minute scene took up 26 pages in the script, and was filmed in two takes. The entire episode was filmed in three night shoots and one studio shoot. It was originally scheduled to be filmed over three days, but a fourth day was added for on-location filming.

The episode follows on from the previous episode where Max discovers where his daughter-in-law Stacey is staying after the death of her husband and Max's son, Bradley (Charlie Clements), and her confession to the murder of Archie. Max goes up to her flat and enters, pressing her for details of Archie's murder, the night of Bradley's death and what she had done in her absence. Stacey explains that she was angry at Archie and was worried about what Bradley would do to him after he found out about the baby. A minute after Bradley confronted Archie, she found Archie on the floor and, lucid and angered at what he had done to her and to her best friend Danielle Jones (Lauren Crace), pushed the bust onto his head, but ran after his fingers twitched, fearing he would call the police. She did not initially tell Bradley the truth about what she did that night, fearing that he would take the blame for her. When she finally told him while they were packing on their wedding night, she offered to confess to the police herself, but he convinced her to flee Walford with him regardless out of his love for her. Stacey also reveals that after she fled the morgue, she contemplated suicide but could not bring herself to do it for the sake of her unborn child; she then went to her mother's old flat which was deserted and did not move for three days; eventually leaving to buy food and drink. Max tells her that he wants to hand her in to the police. Max then chases Stacey outside, where she trips and he catches her. He then drags Stacey to a car, which he breaks into and bundles her into. He then hot-wires the car and drives to a police station. After telling Stacey that she must confess to her mother Jean Slater (Gillian Wright) and the Mitchell family first, he drives her back to Walford where he eventually changes his mind after expressing that Bradley would want her to be happy. The episode ends with them both entering their respective houses and the camera panning up over Walford, rising so high that it morphs into the EastEnders credits.

=== Sharon Mitchell and Michelle Fowler (12 January 2017) ===
This episode features Michelle Fowler (Jenna Russell) revealing to her best friend Sharon Mitchell (Letitia Dean) her reasons for returning to the United Kingdom after 20 years. Although their scenes were interspersed with scenes of Dot Branning (June Brown) at home waiting for her cat, and the episode credited 20 characters, it was officially considered a two-hander by BBC Store and was included in their "EastEnders: Two's Company" collection of two-hander episodes.

=== Phil Mitchell and Jay Brown (21 August 2017) ===
During this episode, Phil Mitchell (Steve McFadden) explains to Jay Brown (Jamie Borthwick) why he has given him the car lot, which is worth £300,000 rather than giving it to his son Ben Mitchell (Harry Reid), who received the lesser valued Arches. Phil tells Jay that Jase Dyer (Stephen Lord) was not his biological father as he didn't know Jay's mother until two months after his birth. Phil tells Jay that a tramp living rough around Albert Square, named Alan Hall, was his birth father and that in an insurance scam back in 1994 he and Frank Butcher (Mike Reid) committed arson to the car lot and that they weren't aware Alan was sleeping in one of the cars within. Phil attempts to persuade Jay that there would be no point in going to prison because he is still paying for the crime in the form of guilt. At the end of the episode Jay is seen sat at "Jase's bench" while Phil is seen making a phone call to an unknown person, he tells them that he's "done it" and "fed him [Jay] a pack of lies and that it's now their turn to keep to the deal".

=== Linda Carter and Stuart Highway (13 December 2018) ===
A two-hander between Linda Carter (Kellie Bright) and Stuart Highway (Ricky Champ). Linda's husband, Mick Carter (Danny Dyer) is in prison because Stuart claims Mick shot him but Linda believes that Stuart is lying. In this episode, Linda seduces Stuart and during their passion, she says Mick used to have an unpredictable energy like Stuart does now, and would have believed he shot someone back then but not now in an attempt to gain a confession. Stuart becomes suspicious and while Linda is out of the room, he finds a recording device hidden behind the bed, which he reveals to Linda. She calls him stupid, saying he thought she liked him but she was repulsed. In the bar, he rants about how Mick has everything and he never cared when Stuart went to prison for something Mick did when they were teenagers. Linda says Stuart made his own decisions and now wants someone to blame because he has nobody in his life. He attempts to rape her but she smashes a bottle on his head, saying he would never have the nerve to pull the trigger but Mick would, to which Stuart says Mick did not shoot him and he leaves. Linda then takes a second recording device she had hidden in her hair and transfers Stuart's confession to her laptop.

=== Jay Brown and Lola Pearce-Brown (18 May 2023) ===
A two-hander episode featuring Jay Brown (Jamie Borthwick) and Lola Pearce-Brown (Danielle Harold). In this episode, Jay breaks Lola out of hospital for a day out to Margate, Lola's childhood home, after finding out that she has weeks left to live after she was diagnosed with a glioblastoma brain tumour. They go to the arcade to play games and ride the rollercoaster and reminiscence about the past, enjoying the time they have left together. Lola steals a ruby necklace for her daughter Lexi Pearce (Isabella Brown), however Jay takes the blame but the shop owner decides not to press charges after hearing about Lola's diagnosis. Lola explains to Jay that she wants Billy Mitchell (Perry Fenwick) to help her die but Jay objects and they both have an argument which leads to Jay accepting Lola's pleas and persuading her to let him help instead, but fearing what could happen to him and what example she would set for Lexi after she is gone, Lola admits to Jay that she is happy to die naturally.

=== Patrick and Yolande Trueman (7 May 2024) ===
A two-hander episode featuring Patrick (Rudolph Walker) and Yolande Trueman (Angela Wynter) in which Yolande opens up to Patrick after being sexually assaulted by Pastor Gideon Clayton (Howard Saddler). In this episode Patrick is vying for answers from Yolande following her sudden change in behaviour after Pastor Clayton suggested to him that she was showing signs of dementia. Yolande tells Patrick she is not ill, and phones Elaine Peacock (Harriet Thorpe) and asks her to tell Patrick the truth before passing the phone to him. During the call, Yolande hides in the bathroom as Patrick follows her upstairs before getting angry and goes to confront the Pastor but is stopped from doing so by Yolande. They return to the house, where Patrick suggests that Yolande may have infiltrated the Pastor's intentions due to them working in close proximity, however Yolande becomes angry and smashes a glass and explains to Patrick that older women were not educated on the MeToo movement. Patrick cuts his hand on the glass and is stitched up by Yolande, who asks Patrick if he'd leave her if she could not face being intimate again, but Patrick says he will remain with her no matter what. The episode concludes with Patrick playing Yolande's favourite song "Can't Get By Without You" by The Real Thing and Yolande tells Patrick that she plans on confiding in someone from the church, but is not ready to inform the authorities.

== Three and four-hander episodes ==
EastEnders is also notable for featuring three and four-hander episodes. Within three-hander episodes three characters often interact across multiple scenes, whilst four-handers generally intercut parallel scenes with two pairs of characters.

=== Notable three-handers ===
Date	Characters	Information
13 February 1992	Kathy Beale; Pete Beale; James Willmott-Brown	Kathy finally lays to rest the ghost of her rape and convinces Pete that their marriage is truly over.
3 September 1992	Sharon Watts; Grant Mitchell; Phil Mitchell	After Phil sleeps with his brother's wife, Sharon, the protagonists have to deal with the aftermath and the possibility that Grant will discover what had happened. Phil makes it clear that he is willing to tell Grant, but when the moment comes, Sharon decides to choose Grant rather than Phil.
23 May 2003	Phil Mitchell; Kate Morton; Jack Dalton	Phil learns that Dalton, his old acquaintance and the square's gangland boss, plans to have Kate raped and murdered for working undercover at his nightclub. Phil, who recently dated Kate, decides to rescue her before she could be killed by Dalton's hitman. Phil later convinces Dalton to let Kate go, and he agrees in exchange for Phil doing him a favour in future. Phil then meets up with Kate at the cafe, and the pair eventually agree to give their relationship another go.
22 October 2004	Martin Fowler; Sonia Fowler; Sarah Cairns	While Sarah, Martin's stalker, holds his wife Sonia against her will at the Fowlers, Martin is facing a race against time in order to rescue his marriage. Sarah tries to poison Sonia against Martin. When this does not work she turns violent and stabs Martin with a pen knife, Sonia lashes out and hits Sarah with a fruit bowl, knocking her out.
16 September 2005	Alfie Moon; Kat Moon; Little Mo Mitchell	Alfie has been seeing both his wife, Kat, and her sister Little Mo at the same time. Alfie urges Kat to give their relationship another go. However, Kat realises that true love means making sacrifices and she cannot hurt her sister by being with him.
18 August 2009	Dot Branning; Ronnie Mitchell; Bianca Jackson	Dot, Ronnie and Bianca are locked in The Queen Victoria and Ronnie and Bianca fight over their children. Dot reveals that she doesn't want to retire and Bianca and Ronnie bond over their past. The episode, written by Wendy Granditer, was the show's first all-female three-hander. Executive producer Diederick Santer said, "We realised that three of our most loved female characters had big turning points this week — Ronnie trying to make the right decision about her relationship with Joel, Dot facing a tough choice about Jim and Bianca finally allowing herself to recognise her true feelings for Ricky. We decided to give those characters [...] some space to thrash out their dilemmas in the form of a (nearly) three-handed episode. Usually when we do a two-hander, we're playing out a story for two characters who are very close, but in this case, unusually, we're featuring characters who don't usually relate to one another. But that is what makes this episode all the more exciting and unique."
1 November 2013	Janine Butcher; Michael Moon; Alice Branning	Michael has been planning the murder of his wife Janine. Having been separated for over a year, Michael has grown increasingly erratic due to the lack of contact allowed between him and their daughter, Scarlett. Having been spurned one too many times by his soon to be ex-wife, Michael concocts a plan to kill her. He manipulates his nanny, Alice, into helping him by telling her he loves her and that they will start a life together once Janine is dead. Alice however, cannot go through with it and tells Janine everything so Janine decides to frame him for an attack on her life. As Janine and Michael play power games with one another and try to manipulate Alice into taking sides, Michael panics when police are called. He attempts to flee with his daughter but Janine has locked the child in a room. Michael then rejects Alice and starts strangling Janine. In an attempt to get him off Janine, Alice stabs Michael in the back. As Alice goes to let the police in, Michael gets up and attempts to grab the knife. Janine gets it first though and stabs Michael a second time in the stomach. This time, it is fatal. As the police view the chaos, Janine cradles Michael's lifeless body.
8 August 2017	Mick Carter; Linda Carter; Whitney Carter	Mick reveals to his wife Linda that he has fallen in love with somebody else. Linda correctly guesses that he means their daughter-in-law, Whitney. She is disgusted with Mick, and pins Whitney up against the wall when confronting her. Linda forces Whitney to leave the family home, and Mick and Linda desperately try and find a way through the situation. Mick then interrogates Linda about why she stayed away from Walford for so long, leading to an almighty argument. After Mick leaves the pub, Whitney tells him that he should not have told Linda about the kiss and that he has lost everything.

=== Notable four-handers ===
- Michelle Fowler and Grant Mitchell – Cindy Beale and David Wicks (3 October 1995) – After Michelle mistakenly thinks Grant has discovered that her brother is suffering from HIV, she goes to confront him in The Vic and only raises his suspicions further. Realising her mistake Michelle is forced to admit she is in the wrong. Grant takes great pleasure in this and proceeds to remind her of her intrusion into his marriage with Sharon. As the two continue to bicker about Grant's treatment of Sharon they begin drinking and manage to find some common ground in their past behaviour. The drink takes hold and they finish the night in bed. Meanwhile, Cindy and David meet up away from Walford to conduct their affair, but the night is ruined when a familiar face spots them and Cindy fears that her husband may be informed about her misconduct. Not wanting to return home David breaks into a barge on a canal and after satisfying their carnal needs the two begin to talk extensively about their lives and the future of their relationship. Cindy wants to be with David permanently, but as ever David is blasé about committing.
- Grant Mitchell and Phil Mitchell – Bianca Butcher and Natalie Price (4 June 1999) – As Bianca and Natalie wait in the hospital to see if Ricky will recover from his accident, old wounds are opened. Bianca cannot forgive Natalie for sleeping with Ricky years earlier, while Natalie cannot forgive Bianca for bullying her. As the former friends converse they finally decide to forgive each other and became friends once again. Meanwhile, Grant is released from prison after attacking a social services representative. Grant accidentally takes Phil to a gay bar to drown his sorrows. Back in Walford they climb onto a railway bridge and make a pact to reunite as an unstoppable force and sort out their enemies in Walford.
- Steve Owen and Barbara Owen – Barry Evans and Natalie Evans (24 July 2001) – Steve visits his ill mother and digs up the painful truth about their past. Steve suffered physical abuse from his mother and has the scars to prove it. Barbara shows little remorse and can only talk about her desire to die. As she begins to suffer from heart pains, she requests a kiss from her son. Eventually she forces him to give her a long incestuous kiss on the lips, which disgusts Steve. He calls her a sick woman and leaves. Meanwhile, Barry pleads with Natalie not to go through with her decision to abort their baby, but she has made up her mind. Her mother never really loved her and she feels she cannot love her baby either.
- Kat Slater and Alfie Moon – Mark Fowler and Sharon Watts (31 January 2003) – Sharon talks Mark out of committing suicide when he is told that his HIV medication is failing. She tells him that the news is the end of his fear and convinces him to embrace his final days. Meanwhile, Alfie tries to convince Kat to take a pregnancy test. She fears that the baby might be Anthony's. After much pressure from Alfie she finally takes the test and discovers she is pregnant.
- Kat Moon and Zoe Slater – Den Watts and Dennis Rickman (3 August 2004) – A night in the cells brings Kat and Zoe closer together. Meanwhile, Den tries to lead Dennis astray.
- Den Watts and Chrissie Watts – Dot Branning and Jim Branning (30 August 2004) – This episode takes place immediately after the two-hander between Den and Dot. Den tries one last time to get Chrissie to forgive him following his affair with Kate but she refuses and he packs his bags and takes off in a taxi for the airport. Meanwhile, Dot finally tells Jim that she has kidney cancer.
- Kat Moon and Alfie Moon – Little Mo Mitchell and Billy Mitchell (30 May 2005) – This episode takes place in the immediate aftermath of Kat's return. Alfie and Kat rake over the past and (unaware of his affair with Little Mo) vows to make a go of things with him. Billy tells Little Mo that he is not prepared to cover for her affair with Alfie.
- Kat Moon and Little Mo Mitchell – Alfie Moon and Billy Mitchell (15 September 2005) – This episode features the fallout from the very public revelation of Alfie and Little Mo's emotional affair by a drunken Billy in the Queen Vic via microphone, which Kat happens to hear. Tense dialogue occurs between Kat and Little Mo at the Slater house, and Alfie and Billy upstairs in the living room at The Vic.
- Ian Beale, Steven Beale, Jane Beale and Lucy Beale (12 October 2007) – Steven lures Lucy to a block of flats where he has kidnapped Ian. They tell Lucy to wait in the kitchen while they talk about Cindy. Lucy escapes and gets her stepmother Jane. Steven points a gun at Ian, telling him not to phone the police, but then he points the gun at his own head. Jane and Lucy and Ian all try to stop him. All viewers hear is a gunshot, followed by the drums. It is later revealed that Jane has been shot.
- Whitney Dean, Rob Grayson, Janine Malloy and Lauren Branning (17 March 2011) – As part of Whitney's sexual exploitation storyline, this episode broadcasts before the 10-minute conclusion episode during Comic Relief 2011. During the episode, Janine and Lauren learn that Whitney is being exploited as a prostitute and try to save her from Rob. They are unsuccessful and Whitney is driven away.
- Linda Carter and Mick Carter – Dean Wicks and Shirley Carter (20 January 2015) – Linda goes to the police about Dean raping her. Mick accompanies her to the police station. Shirley tries and gets Dean's side of the story where she believes him to be still innocent as he is playing the victim card. The episode ends with Linda being happy that she went through with making a statement.
- Rainie Highway and Stuart Highway – Shirley Carter and Mick Carter (6 November 2020) – Rainie informs Stuart that she was never pregnant, while Shirley tries to get to the bottom of why Mick is so interested in Frankie Lewis (Rose Ayling-Ellis).

== Single-hander episode ==
EastEnders had its first (and only to date) single-hander episode which featured only one character, Dot Branning (June Brown), in the entire episode. The episode saw Dot recording a cassette tape of memories for her husband Jim (John Bardon), and was written by Tony Jordan. The episode was shown on 31 January 2008, and was watched by 8.7 million viewers. Instead of the usual theme music, the credits had the song "Pretty Baby" playing over them, as it was referenced in the episode. The episode was also titled "Pretty Baby...."

In March 2009, Brown was nominated for the Best TV Actress award at the British Academy Television Awards for her portrayal of Dot in this episode.

== Influences elsewhere ==
EastEnders two-handers have since been emulated in other British soap operas, notably Coronation Street and Brookside. Australian soap Neighbours featured two-hander episodes in 2019, 2020 and 2024.
