= Jay Brown =

Fictional character from EastEnders

- EastEnders character
- Portrayed by: Jamie Borthwick
- Duration: 2006–2025
- First appearance: Episode 3274; 14 December 2006
- Last appearance: Episode 7174; 19 August 2025
- Introduced by: Kate Harwood
- Crossover appearances: East Street (2010)
In-universe information
- Other names: Jay Mitchell
- Occupation: Student; Mechanic; Administrator; Drug dealer; Undertaker manager; Businessman; Car salesman
- Family: Mitchell
- Father: Jase Dyer
- Mother: Karen Brown
- Adoptive father: Billy Mitchell (foster)
- Wife: Lola Pearce (2023)
- Adoptive daughters: Lexi Pearce
- Grandfathers: Bert Atkinson
- Grandmothers: Evie Brown

Jay Brown (also Mitchell) is a fictional character from the BBC soap opera EastEnders, played by Jamie Borthwick. He made his first appearance on 14 December 2006. Borthwick was suspended from the soap in June 2025 for using unacceptable language whilst participating in Strictly Come Dancing the previous year, and was subsequently axed in September 2025. His final appearance aired on 19 August 2025.

Jay's storylines since joining the programme have included being part of a gang, coping with the death of his father Jase Dyer (Stephen Lord), being orphaned by age 14 which results in his going into foster care and then being taken care of by the Mitchell family, as well as maturing from a wayward teen, becoming a brotherlike figure to Ben Mitchell (Charlie Jones/Joshua Pascoe/Harry Reid/Max Bowden), a relationship with Abi Branning (Lorna Fitzgerald), helping Ben cover up the murder of Heather Trott (Cheryl Fergison), being arrested for having indecent images of a child on his mobile phone after discovering his girlfriend Linzi Bragg (Amy-Leigh Hickman) is below the age of consent, drug dealing and developing a drug habit by taking cocaine. In August 2017, in a two-hander episode between Phil and Jay, Jay finds out that Phil accidentally killed his biological father, a homeless man who was at the car lot the night that Phil set it alight in 1994, however, this is later revealed to be a lie. Jay later embarks on relationships with Ruby Allen (Louisa Lytton), Lola Pearce (Danielle Harold) and Honey Mitchell (Emma Barton). Jay eventually reunites with Lola and they marry in January 2023, however Lola dies in May 2023 from a brain tumour. Jay develops an addiction to ketamine in the aftermath of Lola's death.

== Casting and development ==
Borthwick was 12 years old when he joined the cast of EastEnders. He attended three auditions, followed by a screen test, after which he was offered the part of Jay. Originally a recurring character, Jay was considered a regular from July 2007. He was involved in a minor racism storyline, where he called another character, Yolande Trueman (Angela Wynter), a "black cow". EastEnders executive producer Diederick Santer said this was inspired by the race row in Channel 4's reality show, Celebrity Big Brother, commenting: "The Celebrity Big Brother race row kicked off as I took charge of my first scripts. I thought it was fascinating because it showed there was a real need for a debate about race in Britain. [Big Brother] didn't do it particularly well, so I thought it could be something EastEnders should do. Our stuff won't be overly moralistic or preachy but it will tackle this serious issue head on." Another controversial storyline saw Jay get involved with a gang of youths, ending with him being stabbed in the thigh. A BBC spokesperson said "This is easily one of the most shocking and controversial storylines EastEnders has ever done. It is not a decision bosses have taken lightly, but it is an issue that is top of the news agenda. [...] We're going to tread very carefully — it won't be gratuitous. The plan is to screen the episodes in the usual slots before the watershed. Hopefully by showing the suffering that gang violence can cause, some people may think twice about getting involved."

=== Relationship with Linzi Bragg ===
In December 2015, it was announced that one of the biggest storylines of 2016 would be for Jay, and it was speculated that February 2016's introduction of a new love interest for Jay, Linzi Bragg (Amy-Leigh Hickman), would be linked to this storyline. The episode airing on 18 April 2016 reveals that Linzi is, unbeknownst to Jay, an underage schoolgirl. It was said that Jay would face "severe consequences".

The storyline and Borthwick's performance were praised by viewers on social media. Laura-Jayne Tyler of Inside Soap stated, "EastEnders Jamie Borthwick is the undisputed 'bullseye' star of the week. His performance as Jay was simply outstanding as the fella paid the price for his relationship with Linzi. It's a storyline that tested allegiances, divided a community – and won our vote as one of the best plots of the year. Truly exceptional." Hannah Verdier from The Guardian called it "the most unsavoury of storylines".

=== Suspension and axing (2025) ===
In June 2025, Borthwick was suspended from EastEnders by the BBC after a backstage video from the twenty-second series of Strictly Come Dancing in November 2024 surfaced, showing him referring to the inhabitants of Blackpool by using ableist language considered derogatory toward disabled individuals. The BBC described his language as "entirely unacceptable" and said it did not reflect their values or standards. He issued a public apology in a statement to The Sun on Sunday, expressing regret for his words and acknowledging the offence they had caused. In September 2025, it was announced that Borthwick had been axed from the soap after 19 years and would therefore not be returning to film exit scenes. His final appearance aired on 19 August 2025.

== Storylines ==
Jay is mentioned in 2006 when his dying grandmother, Evie Brown (Marji Campi) tells his grandfather Bert Atkinson (Dave Hill) that he has a grandson. Their daughter, Karen, is Jay's mother who died from breast cancer. Jay appears after Evie's funeral, when he is taken to live with Bert in Walford, per Evie's wishes. Jay is a troublesome youth: he steals, breaks into Pauline Fowler's (Wendy Richard) house, and offends Yolande Trueman (Angela Wynter) with a racist slur to impress his peers. When Jay's father Jase Dyer (Stephen Lord) arrives, Bert leaves to allow Jay and Jase to bond. Jay continues getting into trouble, becoming involved with a gang of older boys, known as the E20 crew, led by Tegs Teague (Ben Smith). Jay helps them shoplift, and they give him a knife. The gang terrorises Dot Branning (June Brown) and Jay steals her keys so they can break into her house. The gang orders Jay to throw a brick through Dot's window, but realising it is wrong, Jay refuses and is rejected from the gang. Tegs later confronts Jay and a fight ensues, with Jay being stabbed in the leg. Tegs is arrested and his mother Tina Teague (Kerry Ann White) tries to threaten Jay from testifying against her son at his trial. However, she is scared off by Jase's girlfriend Dawn Swann (Kara Tointon). Jay gives evidence at the trial and Tegs is sentenced to two years in a Young Offenders Institute.

Jay and Jase try to flee Walford when Jase double-crosses a football firm but Dawn stops their departure by setting a date for her and Jase's wedding. The firm, led by Terry Bates (Nicholas Ball), holds Jay hostage to get revenge on Jase. Jase is able to save Jay with the help from his friend Billy Mitchell (Perry Fenwick), but ends up getting beaten to death by Terry's goons and Billy – too frightened to intervene – leaves Jase to die. Jay accuses Dawn of causing his father's death and goes into care to get away from her. Jay is later fostered by Billy, who is wracked with guilt for not saving Jase from the gang. Jay's behaviour worsens when he plans an arson attack on Dawn, but Billy is able to stop him and Jay eventually makes amends with Dawn. Jay and Billy move into a flat with Janine Butcher (Charlie Brooks), who tries to get rid of Jay by stealing and blaming it on him. Feeling unwanted, Jay befriends Marissa Moore (Finn Atkins), who works at a brothel, and they plan to run away together. When Marissa backs out, Jay runs away alone and sleeps rough, until Billy convinces him to move back in. Terry's trial for Jase's murder approaches and Jay is furious to learn that, rather than attempting to help Jase, Billy hid to save himself. Terry's wife, Viv Bates (Dido Miles), threatens to hurt Jay if Billy testifies. Jay is taken hostage by Terry's firm as a security measure, and Billy risks his own life to save him. Billy and Jay are both rescued by the police and Billy testifies, which results in Terry receiving life imprisonment for murder, partially redeeming himself in the eyes of Jay.

Billy and Jay move in with Billy's relative Phil Mitchell (Steve McFadden). Phil gives Jay a job as a mechanic and they bond. Phil is proud of Jay when he overpowers Connor Stanley (Arinze Kene), a man who sells stolen goods for Phil. In doing so, Jay stops Connor stealing Phil's profits. Impressed with Jay's courage, Phil is pleased when Jay decides to change his surname to Mitchell, though it upsets Phil's son Ben Mitchell (Joshua Pascoe). Despite initial animosity between Ben and Jay, they grow fond of each other, referring to themselves as "brothers". Jay starts dating Abi Branning (Lorna Fitzgerald) despite objections from her father Max Branning (Jake Wood), who thinks Jay is only interested in sex. Jay and Abi do plan to have sex several times, but on each occasion, they are unable to go through with it. Despite Abi's insecurities over Jay's friendship with Lola Pearce (Danielle Harold), she and Jay remain together, and eventually Max comes to accept them as a couple.

In 2012, Phil is imprisoned for the murder of his ex-partner Stella Crawford (Sophie Thompson), who abused Ben then jumped from a building in 2007 after Phil confronted her. It transpires that Ben is behind Phil's arrest, having given a false testimony to the police to punish his father for rejecting him for being gay. Ben admits giving false testimony to his half-brother, Ian Beale (Adam Woodyatt), but Heather Trott (Cheryl Fergison) overhears. Although it is Ian who tells the police about Ben's lie, Ben assumes it is Heather; he confronts her and in a rage, strikes her over the head with a picture frame, killing her. Jay witnesses the murder and is persuaded by Phil, who has just been released from prison, to cover-up Ben's involvement. Jay is traumatised by the murder and incensed to discover Ben has kept evidence to frame him for Heather's murder, should he need to. When Heather's fiancé Andrew Cotton (Ricky Grover) is falsely charged with Heather's murder, Jay is unable to see him sent to prison and tells the police Andrew is innocent, saying he saw him elsewhere at the time of Heather's murder; Andrew is released without charge. With Phil and Ben frequently fighting in the wake of the cover-up, Jay decides he cannot remain living with them and moves in with Abi's family. However, after a long discussion with Max, Jay returns home to live with Phil and his partner Shirley Carter (Linda Henry), who is unaware of Jay's involvement in Heather's death as she was Heather's best friend. Jay is upset when he discovers Abi is planning to go to Costa Rica and proposes to her. She tells him she does not want to be a young bride and leaves for Costa Rica, leaving him heartbroken. Jay seeks comfort in Lola, and after breaking into The Queen Victoria pub, Lola kisses a stunned Jay. While cleaning under Ben's bed, Jay finds the photo frame that Ben used to murder Heather. Horrified, Jay wants to report Ben to the police, but Ben hides the frame in a bin bag. They both agree to dispose of the frame but later find it is missing, as it has been handed in to the local charity shop.

Jay supports Lola through her labour and bonds with the baby, Lexi Pearce (Dotti-Beau Cotterill), in the absence of the biological father. Shirley eventually uncovers the truth about Heather's murder and is horrified that Phil and Jay knew. Ben confesses to the police and they find the photo frame. Jay then backs up Ben's story, is charged with perverting the course of justice and released on bail to live with Billy (unable to return to Phil's as he is a witness). Jay visits Phil, who orders him to change his statement so Ben will not go to prison. However, Jay refuses and Phil disowns him. Jay is comforted by Patrick Trueman (Rudolph Walker). Billy then tells Jay he cannot stay with him; Jay brands him a coward, and breaks down as he misses his father. He is forced to sleep rough and Kat Moon (Jessie Wallace) lets him in for food and drink until her husband Alfie Moon (Shane Richie) turns him away. Jay then secretly sees Lola but she is scared of him and tells him not to go near Lexi. Rejected by the rest of the community, Jay then stays with Patrick, who has offered him a place to stay. Abi returns from her trip and learns from her parents about Jay's involvement in Heather's murder, and she rejects him. The next day she tells him he should have done more to stop Ben. He resumes his friendship with Lola and helps her steal cleaning supplies to make money, and they end up sharing a kiss in front of Abi. Abi insists she is happy for them both, however, Lola says she was just winding Abi up, and the three friends reunite. Jay gains employment from Max but is sacked when Phil refuses to work with Jay, when he has to collect cars from Phil. Abi consoles Jay, and after she is attacked by Alexa Smith (Saffron Coomber), Jay comforts her and they declare their love for each other. Jay is later pleased when Lola asks him to be Lexi's godfather, he has doubts whether he will be good enough but Abi's grandmother and Lexi's godmother Cora Cross (Ann Mitchell) assures him he will be. In court, Jay is sentenced to community service for his part in Heather's death.

Jay, Abi, Lola, Dexter Hartman (Khali Best), Peter Beale (Ben Hardy) and Cindy Williams (Mimi Keene) go on a caravan holiday, where Abi discovers her period is late and tells Jay that she could be pregnant. Jay and Abi argue because she wants an abortion if she is pregnant, while Jay would rather be a father. Abi is not pregnant but Jay thinks their relationship is over, so kisses barmaid Kitty (Chloe May-Cuthill), witnessed by Dexter. Jay and Abi reunite but he feels guilty, and when Kitty keeps calling him, he tells her to stop, but is overheard by Lola. Jay promises Lola that he only loves Abi, and Lola agrees to say nothing to Abi. Dexter reveals Jay's infidelity to Abi in an argument. Abi is devastated, but ultimately forgives Jay.

Lucy Beale (Hetti Bywater) is murdered by an unknown assailant (see "Who Killed Lucy Beale?"), and Jay discovers that Max is having a fling with a detective involved in the case, DC Emma Summerhayes (Anna Acton). He agrees to keep quiet for the sake of the investigation. Emma and her colleagues organise an appeal to raise public awareness into the murder inquiry, and display CCTV footage of a man in a beanie hat on the same bus as Lucy on the night she died. Jay is skittish on seeing the footage and later burns the hat. He then makes arrangements to move away with Abi when she gets accepted into the Bolton University. On hearing that the police have a new lead on the man on the bus, Jay makes plans to leave for Bolton with Abi immediately after saying goodbye to Phil at a barbecue, but during the proceedings Summerhayes and her superior, DI Samantha Keeble (Alison Newman) arrive and question Jay (as seen in scenes available online) over a robbery at a shop near to where Lucy was killed, and it is revealed he was with another man at the time. He denies any involvement and is released without charge. He later confides in Shirley that he was with Ben on the day Lucy was killed, but he has only seen Ben twice since he was released from prison. Shirley forces him to tell Phil, and his initial anger leads Jay to move in with Abi for a while, and he plans to move to Bolton before Phil marries Sharon Rickman (Letitia Dean). Jay later reconciles with Phil and reunites him with Ben (now played by Harry Reid). It is revealed that, under Ben's instruction, Jay buried Lucy's phone and purse in the allotment. On the day of Sharon and Phil's wedding, Jay and Abi split up when Abi realises Jay is harbouring feelings for Lola. When Phil is accidentally shot by Shirley, Jay and Ben are instructed by Ronnie Mitchell (Samantha Womack) to throw the gun in the canal. The Mitchells, including Phil, decide to cover for Shirley by saying that a random person shot Phil.

Jay is horrified to discover that Ben and Abi have begun a relationship and Abi later moves in with the Mitchells. Jay develops feelings for Lola again, who rejects Jay's offer to start a relationship. When Max tricks Ben into signing The Arches over to him, Jay discovers that most of the cars he has been fixing are stolen. Phil lets Max believe that the stolen cars have been located by the police and Max signs the business back to Phil. When Ben is arrested on suspicion of killing Lucy, Jay tells Sharon, Lola and Billy that Ben mugged Lucy. Jay and Lola begin a romantic relationship. Jay realises he could be implicated in Lucy's murder, as her phone and wallet have been handed to the police. He leaves Walford, taking Lola and Lexi. They return to Walford the next day to collect their belongings before moving to Newcastle, but when Billy phones the police in a last ditch effort for more time with Lola, Jay is arrested, and Lola and Lexi move to Newcastle alone. Jay receives a suspended prison sentence and a three-month curfew. Although he intends to join her when the curfew is finished, Lola later calls Jay to end their relationship.

Jay starts a relationship with Linzi Bragg (Amy-Leigh Hickman), but they agree to take things slowly. When they plan to have sex for the first time, and she sends him a video of herself in her new underwear. However, Jay is forced to pick up Louise Mitchell (Tilly Keeper) from school after she gets into a fight. There, Jay discovers Louise was fighting with Linzi, realising that he has been dating a 14-year-old schoolgirl whose real name is Star. Linzi begs Jay not to end their relationship but he tells her to forget that it ever happened, and she reluctantly agrees. Jay then asks Louise not to tell anybody the truth. An unaware Ben texts Linzi from Jay's phone and she comes to Walford but Jay tells her to leave him alone. Linzi is comforted by Bex Fowler (Jasmine Armfield), who tells Linzi's mother, Thelma Bragg (Lorraine Stanley) about the relationship. Thelma goes to The Queen Vic, asking who has had sex with her 14-year-old daughter; in front of everyone, Bex says it is Jay. At home, Jay explains to his family that he did not have sex with Linzi and ended the relationship as soon as he found out her age, but Phil disowns Jay. Jay is arrested after Thelma calls the police. The photos that Linzi sent Jay are found on his phone, and Jay pleads guilty to save Linzi the ordeal of giving evidence in court and the images being shown. Jay is ordered to do 150 hours of unpaid work and to sign the Sex Offenders Register for five years. Phil refuses to harbour Jay after seeing him plead guilty, and when Jay leaves the house, he is cornered by members of Linzi's family and brutally beaten. He spends the night in hospital and then meets Ben, who says he has done nothing wrong and they should carry on as normal, however he is refused service in the pub. Billy allows Jay to stay with him. Pam Coker (Lin Blakley) suggests that he starts working at the undertakers, something her husband Les Coker (Roger Sloman) is not impressed with. However, Jay loses the job when they cannot afford to pay him. Jay struggles to live life as a convicted sex offender and when no one will employ him due to his conviction, he turns to drug dealing. Billy discovers this, warning him that he will start using drugs as well. When Honey finds out about the drug dealing and that Billy knew, she evicts them both. Jay tries to steal money from Honey and Billy's wedding fund, but they catch him doing so and Honey calls the police. The police alert social services and Jay decides to move out, so that Billy and Honey's children will not be taken into care.

Jay supports Ben after his boyfriend Paul Coker (Jonny Labey) is killed in a homophobic attack and helps Ben to find the attackers. The killers break into the Mitchells' house and kidnap Jay and Ben, putting them into a back of a van. Ben is rescued by his uncle Grant Mitchell (Ross Kemp) but Jay is left behind, but escapes when the police arrive. Shortly after giving a statement to the police, Jay decides to leave Walford. However, he is found at a homeless shelter by Pam, who takes him back to the Square and convinces Sharon to let him move back into the Mitchell house and Billy to give him his job back at the funeral home, from which he steals money to give to a drug dealer, Mike Rendon (Bailey Patrick). Mike demands more money, threatening to kill Jay, so Jay steals cash gifts from Lee (Danny Hatchard) and Whitney Carter's (Shona McGarty) wedding reception. Jay also steals jewellery from a corpse but when Billy's son Will Mitchell (Freddie Phillips) catches him, he returns it. Jay is unable to repay Mike, so Mike forces Jay to deal drugs. Billy finds out and sacks Jay. Phil is released from hospital does not want Jay living in his house, but later Phil promises to help Jay with his problem with Mike, telling him to report Mike to the police. Mike is arrested and Phil lets Jay stay with the Mitchells, and Billy gives him his job back. Jay confides in Billy his fear that no woman will want a relationship with him due to his name being on the sex offenders register, but Billy assures him that he will eventually find the right woman.

Phil decides to give Jay the lucrative car lot, and when Jay discovers how much it is worth, he confronts Phil. Phil says that he killed Jay's father, a homeless man who died in a fire at the car lot several years earlier, however, a phone call reveals this as a lie. Jay starts to resent Phil for the death of his apparent father. He decides to stay with his grandfather Bert but Bert returns to Walford unannounced. Bert departs again after talking to Phil and Jay.

In January 2018, it is revealed that Max had blackmailed Phil into lying to Jay about his father dying and that Jase was Jay's real father after all. Max attempts to return the car lot to Jay, but he says he does not want anything from him. Abi is left on a life support machine after falling off the roof The Queen Vic and gives birth to a baby girl on New Year's Eve whilst still on life support- unaware of this, Jay attempts to seduce Whitney but is unsuccessful. Jay is devastated when Abi dies and has a heart to heart with Phil, as she was his first love, close friend and the person he had lost his virginity to. Pam returns to Walford and sacks Billy for illegally exhuming a grave and giving the company a bad reputation, so Jay is made acting manager. Jay is less than pleased when all of his roommates have one by one left the Square and he is forced into allowing Billy, Honey and their children to come and live with him to cover the rent. Jay starts to complain of feeling lonely and isolated due to many of his friends leaving and seemingly hitting a dead-end in his love life. Jay strikes up a friendship with Ruby Allen (Louisa Lytton) when she returns to Walford in September 2018 and begins to develop feelings for her. Ruby and Jay become close but Ruby is hesitant to take their relationship to the next level as she is coming to terms with having been raped earlier in the year. Jay supports Ruby through this and they eventually sleep together. Cracks soon show in their relationship however and it eventually fizzles out.

When Billy's ex-wife Honey Mitchell (Emma Barton) ends her relationship with Adam Bateman (Stephen Rahman-Hughes), she moves back in with Jay and Billy. Jay and Honey become close and their bond is further strengthened when he rescues Honey from being sexually assaulted on a date in October 2020. Honey organizes a Christmas charity event which nearly fails until Jay steps into help. An ecstatic Honey kisses Jay just as Billy walks in, to his horror and disgust as he always viewed Jay as a son and had hoped to reunite with Honey. Jay and Honey later begin a legitimate relationship despite the fact that she is eighteen years older than him, which does cause them to be the victims of gossip by some of the locals, including Janine. Janine persuades Jay to buy stolen cars from her with the aim of pushing the blame on to Jay should the scam be uncovered. This fails when Janine's nephew Liam Butcher (Alfie Deegan) unknowingly drives one of the stolen cars with Frankie Lewis (Rose Ayling-Ellis) locked in the boot.

Jay and Honey's relationship begins to deteriorate and they realise that both are at different stages in their lives, and separate amicably with Honey reuniting with Billy soon after. Despite this, the pair maintain a close bond. Jay begins to redevelop feelings for his old flame Lola and they reunite on Jay's birthday in October 2022. Soon after, Jay accompanies Lola to hospital where she discovers that she has an incurable glioblastoma brain tumour. Jay vows to stand by Lola and although she rejects his marriage proposal on Christmas Day that year, the pair eventually marry on 25 January 2023. Lola is aware that her life will be cut short and makes plans for after her death, including insisting that Jay becomes Lexi's legal guardian as she does not trust Ben's volatile behaviour. Jay and Ben (now played by Max Bowden) fight over this but Ben eventually accepts. Lola eventually dies in the early hours of the morning, surrounded Jay and Lexi. Jay takes Lola's death very hard and eventually moves in with Ben, Lexi and Ben's husband Callum Highway (Tony Clay).

Following Lola's death, Jay shows characteristic signs of bereavement. In September 2023, Jay meets Nadine Keller (Jazzy Phoenix) who offers him emotional support. He discovers that she is student who is paying her way through her college law course by working as an "escort". This relationship continues to develop in October, when Nadine tries to help Jay by sharing some of her ketamine. Callum soon finds out that Nadine has supplied drugs to Jay and calls the police, leading to Jay spending a night in a prison cell. Jay angrily confronts Callum and punches him in the face. Ben and Billy also lash out at Jay and he is kicked out of Ben's home. Gina Knight (Francesca Henry) helps Jay as she has also had a bad history with drugs. Jay becomes very depressed to the point of suicide and wants to drive away, and Gina insists she will drive him as he is under the influence of ketamine. Whilst Gina goes to collect her purse, Jay takes a car from the car lot and drives off into the night, crashing into a tree and ending up severely injured in hospital. Jay recovers and Nadine returns months later claiming she is pregnant. Billy's father Stevie Mitchell (Alan Ford) exposes Nadine and reveals that she was lying about being pregnant to fleece Jay. In August 2025, Jay was last seen talking to Nigel, Phil and Lexi on Bridge Street market about Nigel's chickens before tying Lexi's shoelaces.

In September 2025, Lauren Branning (Jacqueline Jossa) mentions that Jay had gone to look after his grandfather Bert, and she has been left to run the car lot on her own. In December 2025, it was revealed that whilst looking after Bert up north he had begun a relationship with a woman named Elena, with Callum breaking the news to a disappointed Lexi that Jay would be staying with his new girlfriend over Christmas instead of returning to Walford. In February 2026, Lexi finds out Jay and Elena are engaged and expecting a baby. In March 2026, Jay sells the car lot to Max.

== Reception ==
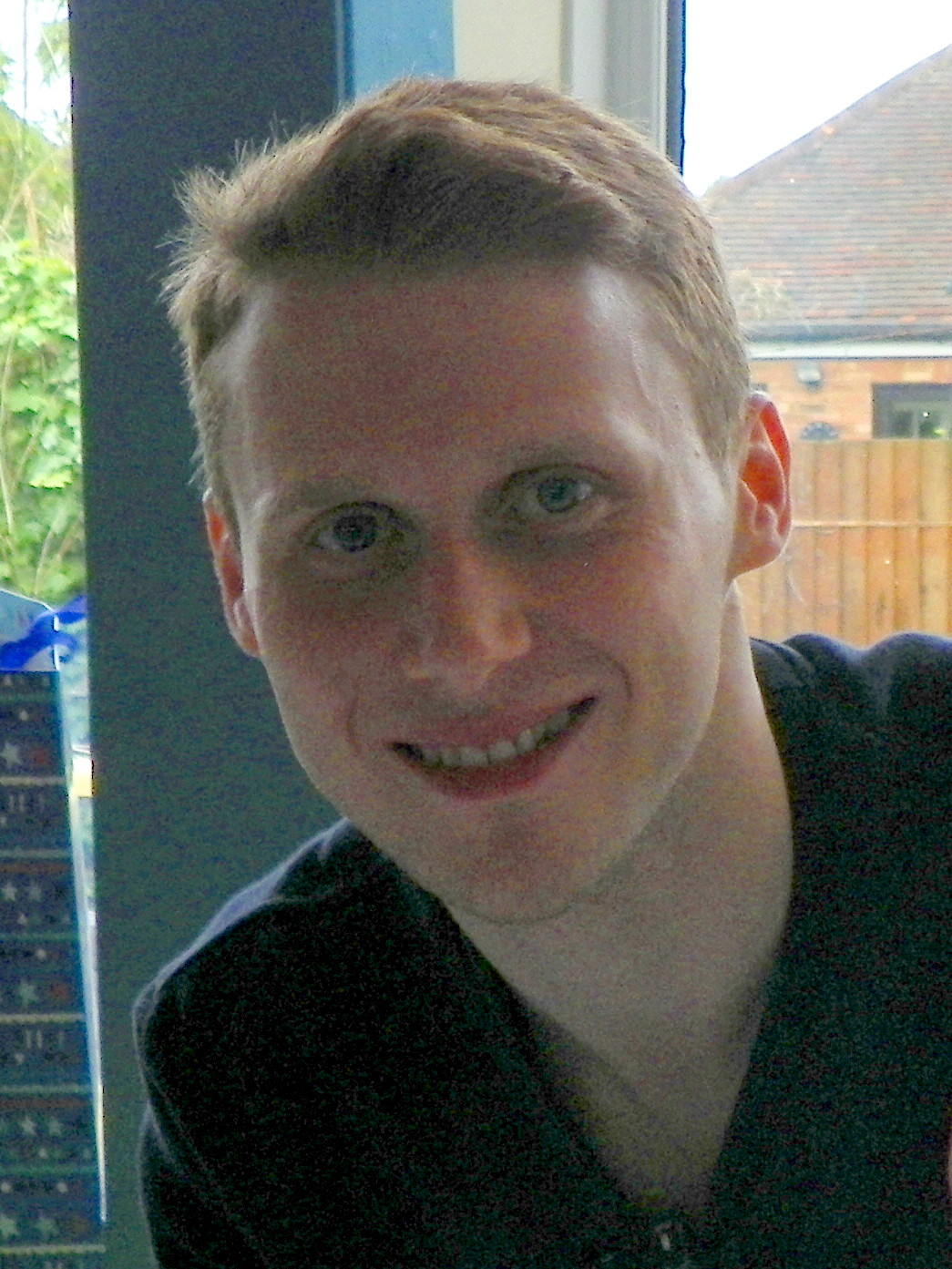
Jamie Borthwick (pictured) has been praised for his portrayal of Jay.

In January 2008, the BBC received 184 complaints from viewers over 13-year-old Jay's stabbing storyline, angry that children would have seen it. A BBC spokesperson defended the storyline, stating: "EastEnders has always tackled difficult issues and we acknowledge that some viewers could consider this storyline challenging. However, we aim to reflect real issues and during this storyline the audience will see Jay's torment through to him deciding not to yield to peer pressure like his father did many years ago. This is part of a long-running storyline that in no way glamorises the use of knives, or portrays violence in a positive light. In fact the storyline will culminate in the character of Jay doing the right thing."

Borthwick has been praised by critics for his portrayal of Jay. Nancy Banks-Smith of The Guardian wrote that the episode in which his father died "offered Jason's young son, Jay (Jamie Borthwick), a chance to steal the show, which he duly did with a touching torrent of grief. His father, a thief himself, would have been proud of him." Borthwick won the award for 'Best Dramatic Performance from a Young Actor or Actress' at the 2008 British Soap Awards, and was nominated for 'Best Child Actor' at the 2008 Digital Spy Soap Awards. He was also nominated for "Best Young Actor" at the 2007 Inside Soap Awards.
