= Lola Pearce =

Fictional character from EastEnders

- EastEnders character
- Portrayed by: Danielle Harold
- Duration: 2011–2015, 2019–2026
- First appearance: Episode 4246; 12 July 2011
- Last appearance: Episode 7290; 4 March 2026
- Introduced by: Bryan Kirkwood (2011); Kate Oates (2019); Ben Wadey (2025–2026)
- Spin-off appearances: Billy's Olympic Nightmare (2012); The Queen Vic Quiz Night (2020)
In-universe information
- Other names: Lola Pearce-Brown
- Occupation: Chip shop worker; Cleaner; Salon assistant; Beautician; Hairdresser
- Family: Mitchell
- Father: Dan Pearce
- Mother: Emma Harding
- Husband: Jay Brown (2023)
- Daughters: Lexi Pearce
- Grandfathers: Billy Mitchell
- Grandmothers: Julie Perkins
- Uncles: Will Mitchell
- Aunts: Janet Mitchell
- Other relatives: Stevie Mitchell; Phil Mitchell; Sam Mitchell; Ronnie Mitchell; Roxy Mitchell; Ben Mitchell; Louise Mitchell

Lola Pearce (also Pearce-Brown) is a fictional character from the BBC soap opera EastEnders, played by Danielle Harold. She was introduced as the granddaughter of Billy Mitchell (Perry Fenwick) and Julie Perkins (Cathy Murphy), and an extension to the already established Mitchell family. Lola made her first appearance on 12 July 2011. Her storylines have mainly focused on her relationship with her family, a teenage pregnancy after a one-night stand with her third cousin once removed Ben Mitchell (Joshua Pascoe), fighting to keep newborn daughter Lexi Pearce (Dotti-Beau Cotterill) out of care, her friendships with Abi Branning (Lorna Fitzgerald), Dexter Hartman (Khali Best) and later Frankie Lewis (Rose Ayling-Ellis), relationships with Peter Beale (Ben Hardy/Dayle Hudson) and Jay Brown (Jamie Borthwick), improving her situation by becoming a hairdresser, having an abortion after becoming pregnant by Jay, and being diagnosed with a glioblastoma brain tumour which resulted in her death.

Some critics gave a positive response to Lola's introduction. Kate Woodward of Inside Soap said Lola's introduction had been a "revelation" and Tony Stewart from the Daily Mirror stated "in little less than a month on the Square, the spirited Lola has already created havoc." On 23 July 2012, Lola gave birth to her daughter, Lexi Pearce, during a seven-minute live segment, making her the first character to ever give birth live on EastEnders and the second character ever in soap opera. On 13 June 2015, it was announced that Harold was exiting her role as Lola after being written out of the show. Harold left the show on 28 July 2015. Bosses left the door open for her to return, and a return for the character was announced on 20 December 2018. Lola returned on 1 April 2019. On 15 June 2022, it was announced that Harold had been axed from EastEnders once again, and Lola's death was broadcast on 31 May 2023, after a storyline of her battling a terminal brain tumour. Following on from her death, Lola continued to make appearances via video recordings up to 4 March 2026.

== Creation and development ==
=== Casting ===
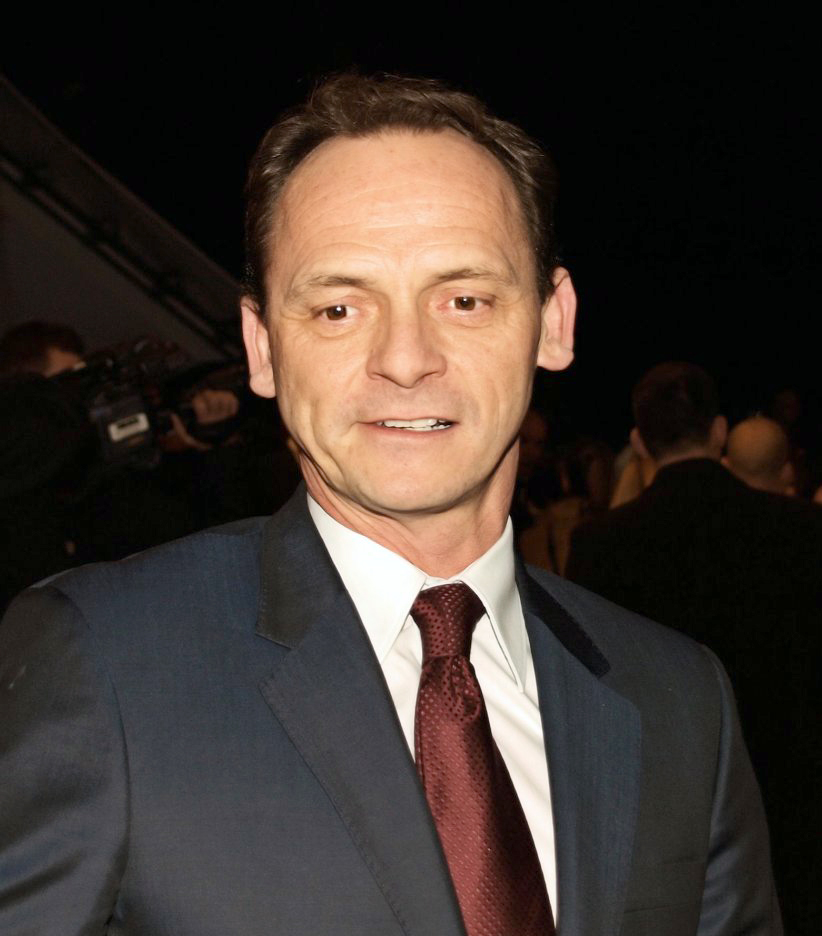
Lola was introduced as the granddaughter of Billy Mitchell (played by Perry Fenwick, pictured).

The character of Lola was announced on 7 June 2011 and she was created as an extension of the established Mitchell family. As she meets her grandparents for the first time, Lola quickly forms a bond with them as she has been deserted by everyone else in her life. Eighteen-year-old Harold was cast in the role and she said "I am so excited to be joining EastEnders. I have watched the show all my life and I never thought that one day I could be in Albert Square. It feels strange to be walking round Walford with people I have grown up watching—I still have to pinch myself.". EastEnders is Harold's first acting job and she was given the role following her first audition, which shocked her. Harold told Daybreak, "It was my first audition that I'd ever had, so I was really nervous and I was thinking, 'I'm never going to get it - I'm just going to have fun while I'm there'. I was just shocked to even get the casting for it, so I was over the moon when I actually got the part." Harold previously starred in Jamie Oliver's Channel 4 reality show Jamie's Dream School and got into an acting school because of the show. Harold said she had always wanted to be an actress and was grateful to be given a great character in Lola. Lola made her first appearance on 12 July 2011.

=== Characterisation and style ===
In an interview with Inside Soap, Harold said she was grateful for the complex nature of her character, saying, "Lola's not out-and-out evil but she's not very nice. She's got so many sides and I am having a great time exploring them." Lola is described as "a stroppy little 15-year-old, prone to fighting, tea-leafing and gobbing off." She is also "sharp, cocky but likeable." Of Lola's personality, the official EastEnders website said "Bright as a button but with a mouth that runs away with her, Lola is wild and definitely Walford bound. A self-reliant person who does what she has to do in order to get what she wants, she's not to be messed with."

Lola learnt a few valuable life skills in care - none of them strictly legal. But though she has an eye for mischief, Lola's always been too wary to get into really big trouble. Though Lola has a hard edge, she's loyal and loving to those she can trust. She loves her 'pops', Billy Mitchell, ferociously. Now pregnant, we wonder what motherhood will do to Lola? And exactly how much childcare her friends and family are going to be forced into...

— The official EastEnders website's description of Lola (2012)

Harold described her character as "feisty" and said she has got a lot of attitude. Daniel Kilkelly from Digital Spy, labelled Lola "rebellious", while the BBC said she is "a troublesome teen" and a "petite bombshell." BT described the character as "EastEnders' new tearaway and Billy's wayward granddaughter" and said "It seems Lola isn't exactly the butter-wouldn't-melt type. Surprise, surprise. Billy and Julie leave when Lola tells Billy she's not interested in the fact that he's her granddad, or that her dad's dead. What a lovely young lady." Virgin Media also branded Lola a troublemaking, teen tearaway and said she was "a chip off the Mitchell block." They added that she is a "blonde babe." Chris Hooton from the Metro branded Lola as "mischievous." Lola usually wears a tracksuit and trainers.

=== Storyline development ===
When Lola arrives she becomes embroiled in a love triangle with Jay Mitchell and Abi Branning. The storyline was summed up in Inside Soap by Kate Woodward who commented "Although I love Abi and Jay together, it's great to see them face serious obstacles thanks to her meddling. Lola is big trouble and has Jay is firmly in her sights. But he's in love with Abi. It was a brilliant idea to team moody Jay with good girl Abi. They work well as a couple, but with the interference of Lola their story has got even more interesting." When Phil Mitchell (Steve McFadden) begins to be stalked, the BBC named Lola one of the many suspects. However, the stalker is later revealed to be Ben Mitchell (Joshua Pascoe).

==== Pregnancy, live birth and motherhood ====
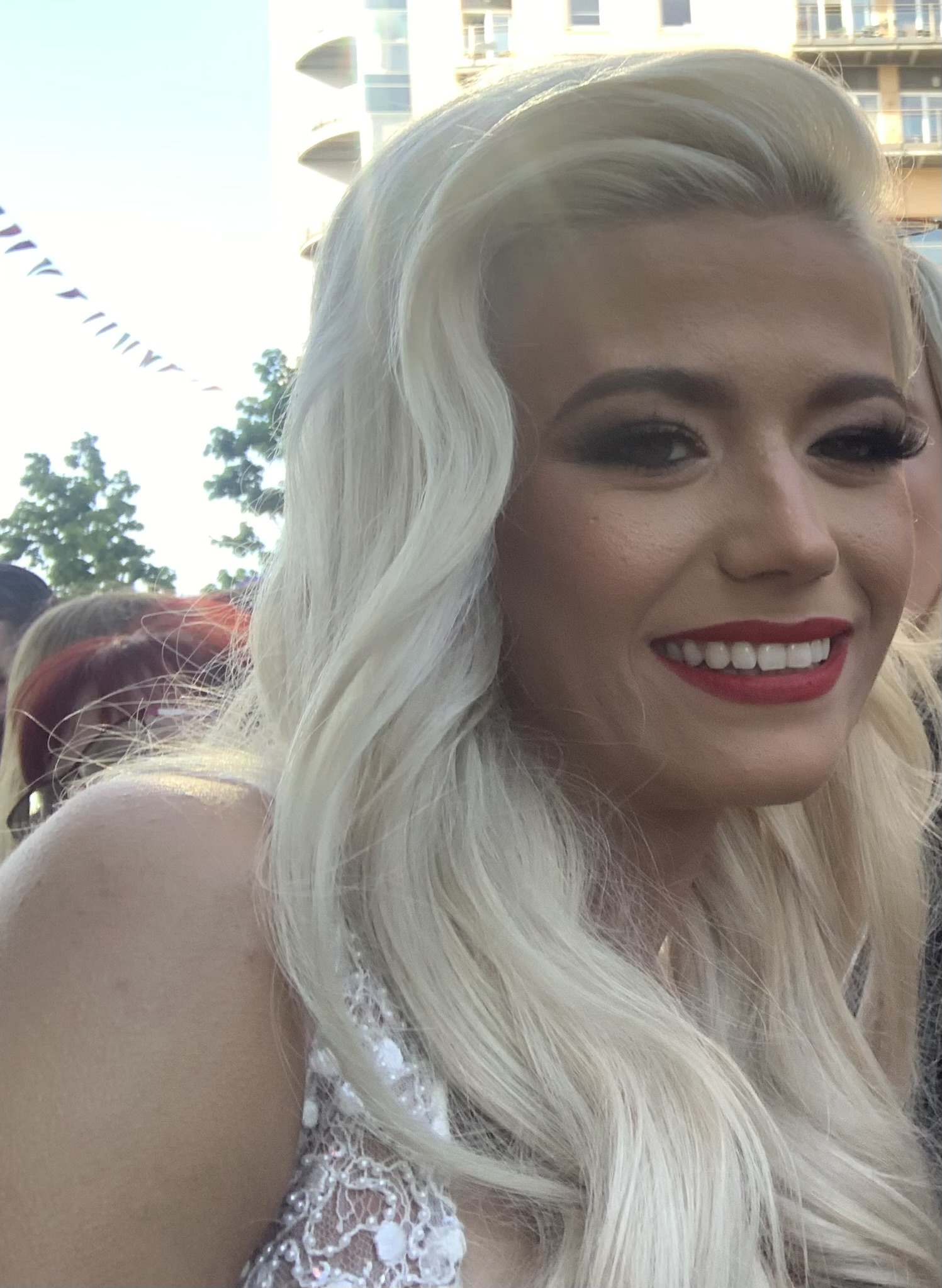
Danielle Harold (pictured) portrayed Lola from 2011 to 2015, and then from 2019 to 2026.

On 15 July 2012, it was revealed that Harold would become only the second actress to act out a birth during a live episode of a soap opera, following Coronation Street's Jennie McAlpine (Fiz Brown) in the live 50th anniversary episode broadcast in December 2010. An insider from the Daily Mirror stated "No-one has tried anything like this on EastEnders live before so it is a real challenge to get the emotion of the situation right. It will be the toughest thing Danielle has done in her acting career." The episode broadcast on 23 July 2012 and centred around Lola's grandfather Billy carrying the Olympic Torch across Walford. A seven-minute live segment at the end of episode showed Lola giving birth to her daughter, while Billy rushed to witness the birth.

Harold said of the rehearsals for the live section: "I have known about this live episode for such a long time but all of a sudden it has crept up on us. I am really nervous but now we have started rehearsing, I am feeling equally excited. It will definitely be an experience and I hope Perry runs smoothly!" She also said she was "terrified" of acting out the birth, saying she would prefer to give birth in real life. She said that filming the pre-recorded labour scenes meant she "was knackered after screaming and crying and pretending to push all day." In an interview with Digital Spy, she said that she was "really, really nervous" and that the prospect of acting the birth was "very scary", but added, "I really appreciate that they've given me the opportunity, especially considering that I haven't been here at EastEnders for that long. It's really nice that they've trusted me with it, so hopefully I'll do it justice! It's a once-in-a-lifetime opportunity, so I'm keeping my fingers crossed that it'll go well." To help prepare, she asked several women for advice, including her mother, and was told "It's the worst pain you can ever imagine!" She found it "quite difficult" to imagine what it would be live to act out as she has no children, but had watched Channel 4 show One Born Every Minute to help, as she did not want to "overdo the scene or make it look really fake."

=== Departure and reintroduction ===
On 13 June 2015, entertainment website Digital Spy revealed that EastEnders had chosen to write the character out of the show. They announced that Harold would be filming her final scenes within the following months and that show bosses are not killing Lola off, leaving potential for a return in the future. Harold praised her time on the show and the storylines she has been given: "I've had the most amazing time at EastEnders having been involved in some exciting storylines, including giving birth in a live scene." She also said how she would miss the cast and crew at EastEnders and how she looks forward to her acting future. Executive producer, Dominic Treadwell-Collins spoke of Danielle and her time on the square: "We all love Danielle and she and Lola have been a big part of EastEnders over the past four years. Danielle is a fantastic actress and I genuinely look forward to seeing her shine in future roles away from the Square." Lola's exit scenes aired on 28 July 2015.

In May 2018, Harold expressed an interest in reprising her role as Lola, opining that Billy needed her character's support. She added that she would return if she was asked. Seven months later, on 20 December 2018, it was announced that Lola would return to EastEnders over three years since her exit. Upon her reintroduction, the character is billed as matured and "a fiercely protective mum" to Lexi. Harold expressed her delight at reprising her role, commenting, "I can't wait to get back and find out what Lola has been up to." Kate Oates, the senior executive producer of EastEnders, said that she "admired Lola's feisty, fiery spirit" and looked forward to her return. She added that it would create storylines for the characters related to Lola, including Jay and Billy.

=== Brain tumour and death ===
In June 2022, it was reported that Harold had been axed by new executive producer Chris Clenshaw as part of his plan to reinvent the show. Other characters to be axed alongside Lola included Peter Beale (Dayle Hudson), Stuart Highway (Ricky Champ), Dana Monroe (Barbara Smith) and Jada Lennox (Kelsey Calladine-Smith); however, Lola's departure attracted the most media attention. It was speculated that Lola would be killed-off as part of an illness storyline to raise awareness; however, nothing was initially confirmed by EastEnders. The decision to axe Lola was met with high volumes of criticism from fans and critics alike, who believed that Lola's character had "a mass of potential storylines to be explored in the future", and felt passionately that Harold had created a fan favourite and that it would be a grave mistake to lose her. A spokesperson for EastEnders told Radio Times that Harold was reportedly "teary" at the decision to write Lola out of the show; however, she accepted the news like a professional and was looking forward to her exit storyline.

In October 2022, it was officially announced that Lola would be killed-off after being diagnosed with a brain tumour, in a storyline that drew inspiration from the death of The Wanted singer, Tom Parker. EastEnders announced that they would be working closely with Brain Tumour Research, Macmillan Cancer Support and other experts in the field to portray Lola's illness accurately. When discussing the storyline, executive producer Chris Clenshaw said: "It was vital for us to work alongside Macmillan and Brain Tumour Research to take on, and accurately present, such a profound and emotional storyline for Lola, one that many viewers may relate to. Danielle has thoughtfully relayed the realities of being diagnosed with a brain tumour with grace and understanding. We hope that this storyline resonates with the audience, and that we represent it as sensitively, and accurately as possible". Harold added, "It means so much to be trusted with a storyline like this – one that's close to many people's hearts. Sadly many of our viewers will be able to relate to Lola's story and it's been heartbreaking to speak to the families affected by brain tumours and hear their stories. They've been so amazing in sharing their experiences with me, and I'm so lucky to have them. I wouldn't be able to do this storyline without their support".

Sue Castle-Smith, Head of PR and Communications for the charity Brain Tumour Research, made the statement: "We are extremely grateful to EastEnders for helping to raise awareness of brain tumours. Sadly, Lola's story is all too familiar to thousands of families. Brain tumours are indiscriminate and can affect anyone at any age, they kill more children and adults under the age of 40 than any other cancer". Dany Bell, Strategic Advisor for Macmillan Cancer Support for Treatment, added: "Storylines like Lola's play a crucial role in raising awareness and can genuinely save viewers' lives, so we are really pleased to be helping EastEnders ensure a realistic experience is being portrayed on the show. The moving storyline will show how suddenly a diagnosis can impact every aspect of a person's life and how challenging it can truly be. We know that what Lola and her fictional family are going through on EastEnders is a daily reality for many people around the UK right now, and Macmillan is here to offer advice and support to anyone who needs it. Anyone watching with concerns about any potential signs or symptoms of cancer must also speak to their GP as soon as possible". In a separate interview at The Inside Soap Awards, Harold said: "There's so much pressure to make sure you get it right and keep it as true for the audience as you can. That's why we've been trying to make sure we keep it on point and all the research is used and it's been great. It's not just me. It's the whole family who go through it. It's really nice to see how everyone reacts and how everyone supports Lola. It's really difficult, the whole journey of the brain tumour and how hard it really is. I didn't realise just how devastating it really is until I got into my research and followed the story. We don't know where it's going to go yet and where it ends up so I'm not really looking too far down the line and I'm just taking it as it comes at the moment because it's quite tough, all these steps".

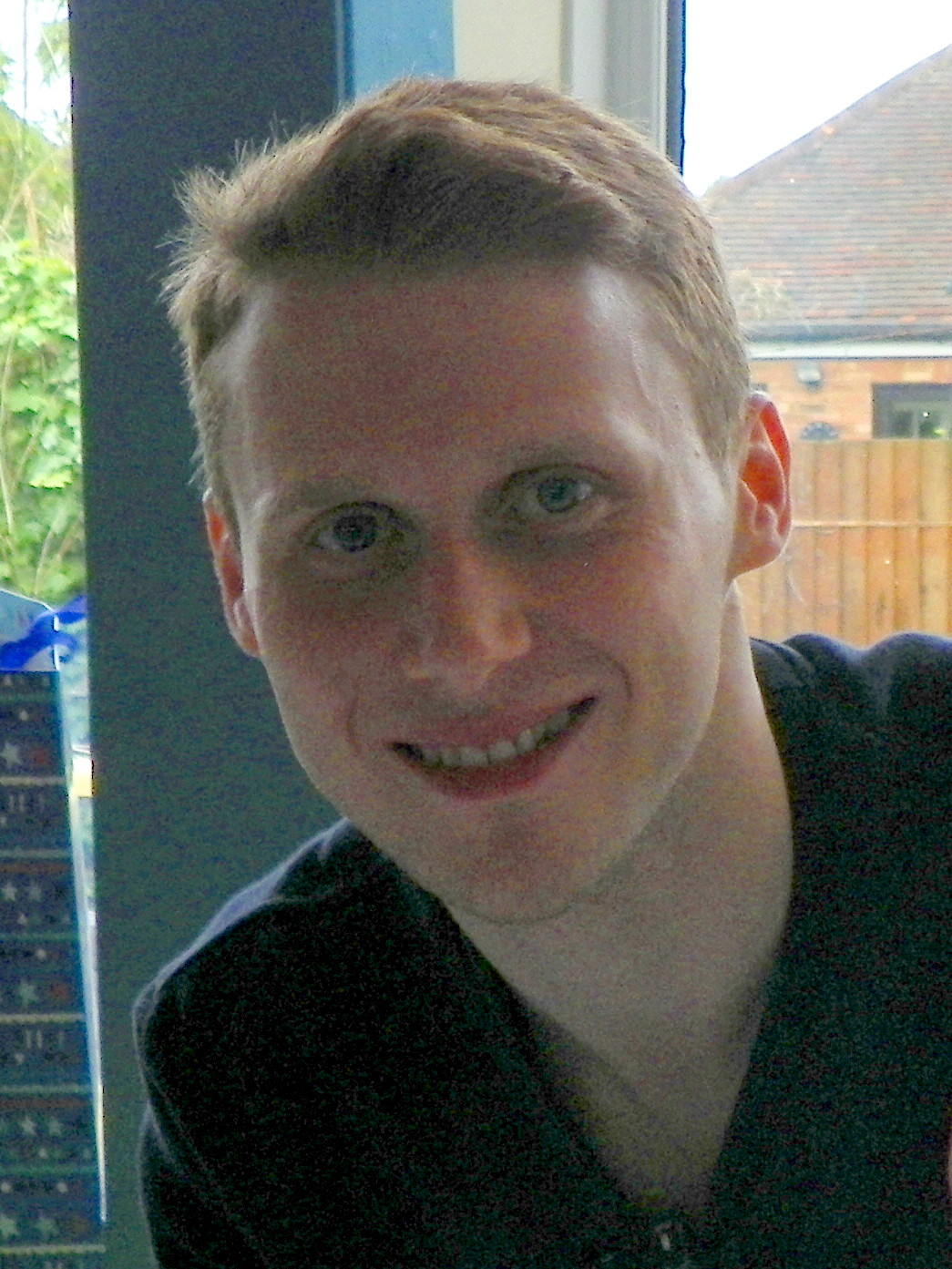
Lola married Jay Brown (played by Jamie Borthwick, pictured) in the months leading up to her death.

The storyline begins in late October 2022, when Lola collapses and suffers a seizure at the community centre during Lexi's dancing competition. As part of the storyline, it was decided that Lola and Jay would reconcile as a couple, as Jay would support Lola through her diagnosis and the aftermath. Lola is then taken to hospital, where she is diagnosed with a high grade glioblastoma multiforme, an aggressive and fast-growing form of brain cancer. As part of her treatment, Lola is informed that she will require surgery in an attempt to remove the tumour, in addition to chemotherapy in the form of tablets. After undergoing brain surgery, Lola and her family are informed that the tumour was positioned in an intricate place within the brain, and that the cancer had advanced faster than the surgeons had anticipated. The storyline then looks at how Lola and her family cope with her terminal diagnosis. The plot then examines the complexities of Lola's relationships with her boyfriend Jay, daughter Lexi, grandfather Billy and his partner Honey, close friend Ben and his husband Callum Highway (Tony Clay), and her close colleagues Denise Fox (Diane Parish) and Kim Fox (Tameka Empson), as they all come to terms with the prospect of losing Lola. As part of a Christmas storyline, it was announced that Jay would propose to Lola, with their wedding taking place in early 2023. After being rushed to hospital by Kim following an uncontrollable nosebleed, Lola arrives at the registry office and marries Jay on 26 January 2023.

Amidst Lola's brain tumour storyline, Clenshaw announced his intentions to expand on Lola's backstory in the months leading up to her death. A major part of this included the introduction of Lola's estranged mother, Emma Harding, which was officially announced in November 2022. It was later announced that former Emmerdale actress Patsy Kensit had been cast in the role of Emma. Clenshaw felt that Emma shared some similarities with Lola, including "a striking resemblance; successful, the capacity to hold her own [...] and she's a fighter". He noted that Emma is also "softly spoken and measured", unlike Lola. Emma's introduction begins when Lola decides she wants to find out where she came from, and so Billy and Phil manage to locate Emma on Lola's wedding day to Jay. Lola's reunion with Emma is complicated, with Emma not initially revealing her true identity to Lola, and later threatening one of Lexi's bullies outside the school gates. Emma's backstory explains that she was the victim of domestic violence at the hands of Lola's father, Dan, and after Dan threw a kettle of boiling water over her and she spent months in hospital recovering with skin grafts, she decided to leave Lola in Dan's care when Lola was three years old to save herself from his abuse. After three months on screen, Emma departs on 30 March 2023, after Lola is told that she only has six months to live and Emma decides that she cannot cope with losing Lola.

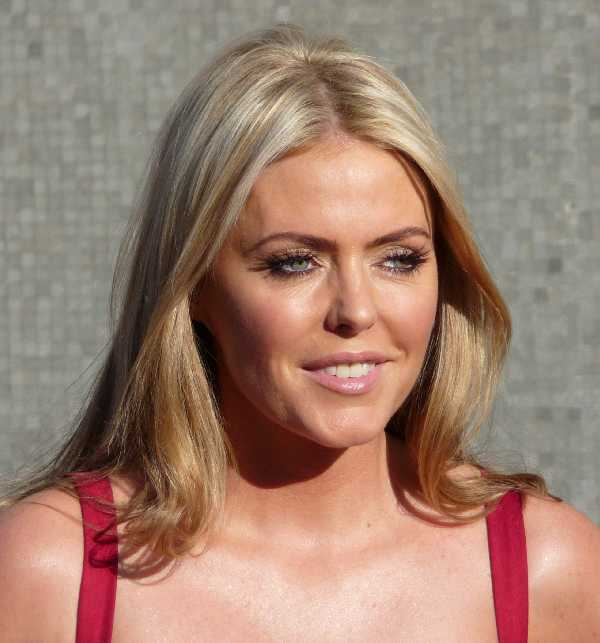
Patsy Kensit (pictured) was cast as Lola's estranged mother, Emma Harding.

Lola's health continues to decline over the coming months, and she eventually decides to give up work at the salon. During her leaving party, Lola collapses and is unable to move the right side of her body. After being admitted to hospital, Lola and her family are told that she now only has weeks to live. Lola then begins contemplating assisted suicide, and asks Billy to help her die when the time comes. He reluctantly agrees, however only if she tells Jay of her decision. It was then announced that Jay and Lola would feature in a two-hander episode broadcast on 18 May 2023, where Jay breaks Lola out of hospital for one final day out in Margate – Lola's childhood home. When discussing the scenes in Margate and her final scenes in the show, Harold said: "I didn't want to read my final script. We pick them up from the script desk if we are in work and my final ones were sat there for ages. Then I had them at home for a few days - it took me a good two weeks before I was able to read them. I made myself a cup of tea, sat down in my living room and thought, 'Right, just do it'. I got to the second page and was in absolute bits. It was the hardest thing to read but it's also the most beautiful episode of EastEnders I've ever read". Some fans noted that the day out in Margate shared similarities to the Waterloo Road storyline, in which Sambuca Kelly, played by Holly Kenny, who was dying from an inoperable brain tumour, was taken to Blackpool for the day by her boyfriend Finn Sharkey (Jack McMullen), only for Sambuca to die in her sleep later that night. During the scenes in Margate, Borthwick displayed his personal talent for music, and performed the song "Wonderful Tonight" by Eric Clapton playing the guitar, as Jay serenaded Lola on the beach.

Shortly after returning from Margate, Lola becomes bedridden at home, and she slowly loses the ability to speak. However, before being unable to communicate, Lola decides that she wishes to be baptised by Reverend Irene Mills (Melanie Kilburn), to ensure her pathway to heaven. Ben, unable to accept that Lola is now in her final days, decides to travel to America in search of a clinical trial, with the hope of Lola living to see Lexi's first days at secondary school. Lola eventually loses consciousness altogether, and begins suffering regular seizures as the locals visit to say their goodbyes. The BBC eventually announced that Lola's final episode would be broadcast on 31 May 2023, with EastEnders airing a special alternative opening sequence in which the aerial view of the East End of London is set during the night with city lights, as opposed to the usual daytime setting. After an episode where Billy and Honey share their fondest memories of Lola, and Phil compares her to his late mother Peggy Mitchell (Barbara Windsor) due to their fiery personalities, Lola peacefully dies at dawn with Lexi and Jay at her bedside. After Jay compares Lola to a fox because of her renowned mischievous and feisty character, a red fox is later seen running through Albert Square as the sun rises, suggesting that Lola's spirit will live on, with the credits then rolling over Julia's Theme. Lola later appeared as a corpse at the funeral parlour when Jay and Billy visit her body, before her funeral is held on 27 June 2023, where Lexi plays personal footage of Lola during the service. Kensit made a brief cameo return as Emma for Lola's funeral. After watching a private video where Lola declares her love for Jay to Lexi, Jay breaks down in tears, with the credits then rolling over a cover of Alphaville's "Forever Young" by Becky Hill.

== Storylines ==
=== 2011–2015 ===
When Billy Mitchell (Perry Fenwick) and Julie Perkins (Cathy Murphy) decide to find the son that Julie put up for adoption as a baby, Dan Pearce, they discover he has died. However, they find that they have a granddaughter, Lola, who is in care. They visit Lola at the care home and witness a fight between Lola and another girl, believing Lola is the injured girl, but Lola turns out to be the perpetrator. She tells Billy and Julie that Dan hated them so Julie decides to leave. Billy hugs Lola before they go and Lola uses this as an excuse to steal his wallet.

The next day, she comes to Walford and returns Billy's wallet. She flirts with several locals, including Jay Brown (Jamie Borthwick) and Fatboy (Ricky Norwood). Fatboy allows her to clean cars for him but she takes one and crashes into it into Ian Beale's (Adam Woodyatt) chip shop. Billy sees this and tells her to run and Fatboy takes the blame. Lola visits Billy again and meets other members of his family. Julie tells Heather Trott (Cheryl Fergison) that she does not want Lola to live with them and Heather accidentally tells Lola. Julie feels that Lola is not their problem and Lola tells Julie that if Billy is forced to choose between them, she will win. Julie calls the police and has Lola returned to her care home, while Billy calls her "100% Mitchell". A week later, Julie finds Lola in the R&R nightclub and takes her home, after Julie apologises for reporting Lola to the police, and tries to get to know Lola properly.

Lola overhears Anthony Moon (Matt Lapinskas) and his brother Tyler Moon (Tony Discipline) insulting Billy, and in revenge, burns their father Eddie's (David Essex) stock. She gets a job at the café and admits to Liam Butcher (James Forde) that she started the fire. Lola starts stealing from the till at the café and short-changing the customers so Phil Mitchell (Steve McFadden) sacks her. She asks Phil for her job back and offers her mobile phone in payment for the money she took but he takes the phone and refuses to give Lola her job back. She takes revenge by smashing up his garage and destroying a car, unaware that Jay is under the car, and is badly injured. She gets Julie and when the ambulance arrives, Julie takes the blame. She is released without charge, while Lola returns to the care home but is persuaded to come back and Julie leaves Walford.

Weeks later, Ian oversleeps and Lola tells him that she has been waiting outside the chip shop. Mandy Salter (Nicola Stapleton) tells Ian to fire her, which he does but Lola soon persuades Ian to give her job back, by promising not to tell anyone about Mandy staying. She takes a liking to Jay's friend, Duncan Willis (Steven France) but later vandalises Grace Olubunmi's (Ellen Thomas) flowers. She decides to take up self-defence classes after Abi Branning (Lorna Fitzgerald) is mugged. Lola steals towels from the Booty beauty salon and tries to sell them but is caught by Roxy Mitchell (Rita Simons), who threatens to call the police. However, Lola convinces Roxy that she has shown ingenuity, and gains a job at the salon.

Lola asks her third cousin once removed Ben Mitchell (Joshua Pascoe) how he knows he is gay if he is still a virgin. Subsequently, they kiss and Lola sleeps with Ben before confirming his sexuality; he is gay. Shortly after, Lola finds she is pregnant and tells Billy, who is angry. Lola refuses to name the father but tells Billy that she plans to keep the baby and wants him to bring it up with her. She later tells Ben that he is not the father. Billy takes Lola to see Pat Evans (Pam St Clement) about help, but Pat misunderstands and advises Lola to have an abortion, angering her. In December, Phil confronts Lola about a mystery file, thinking that she's been stalking him. Phil questions Lola, to the point where she steps backwards and falls down the steps to her basement flat. She is rushed to hospital and soon learns that she and the baby are fine. Lola receives a call to say Social Services want to visit, as there is a new social worker. Lola goes missing when the social worker, Harpreet (Danny Rahim) arrives, so Billy asks Abi to pretend to be Lola. Billy assumes Harpreet is there about the pregnancy, so tells Harpreet, who is impressed with Abi's speech about motherhood. However, Lola arrives as he is about to leave and tells him that she is Lola, so Harpreet says the trust has been lost and she may not be able to keep the child. After falling down the stairs, she realizes how much the baby means to her and later finds out the baby is a girl.

Lola begins working for Janine Butcher (Charlie Brooks) as a cleaner and continues working at the chip shop, until Lucy Beale (Hetti Bywater), sacks her. Lola takes revenge on Lucy by stealing chip fat from the shop and pouring it over cars at the car lot, making Lucy a suspect. When Lucy learns Lola is responsible, she calls the police and Lola is arrested. The next day, on her 16th birthday, she receives community service and a curfew, and has to wear an electronic ankle tag. Lola and Jay break into The Queen Victoria public house and get locked in after hiding in the back room. There, Lola opens up to Jay saying she will be a bad mother. Lola gets home just in time for her curfew, then runs back out and shares an illicit kiss with Jay, who is actually still dating Abi. She angers Cora Cross (Ann Mitchell), after vandalising her stock at the charity shop and later prepares for Billy carrying the Olympic Torch but realises she is in labour in McClunkeys, where Cora delivers Lola's baby daughter whom she names Lexi Billie Pearce, after her friend, Alexa Smith (Saffron Coomber). Billy witnesses the birth after successfully carrying the torch. When it is revealed, that Jay helped to cover up Heather's murder, Lola is at first wary of him, although she eventually forgives him. However, Billy is unhappy about them spending time together especially when Jay is forced to hide when a social worker turns up. Lola appears heartbroken when Jay says they should stop seeing each other.

When Lola gets a new social worker, Trish Barnes (Tessa Churchard), she becomes increasingly agitated after Trish criticises her care of Lexi. She later bumps into Alexa and pretends to live a party lifestyle. Alexa and her gang spend time with Lola but when Alexa picks on Abi, Lola defends her and rejects her old friend. Lola later reveals she has a baby, named Lexi after Alexa, shocking her. Lola celebrates her tag being removed but is threatened by Alexa and her gang, who attack Abi and threaten Lexi, resulting in Lola punching Alexa. The police are informed and Lola is arrested while Trish takes Lexi into care. Lola begs Trish not to and asks Phil for help, telling him that he is Lexi's grandfather. Lexi is taken regardless and Trish tells her that Lexi could be away for up to eight weeks. Lola gets angry so Trish tells her she could lose Lexi for good if she does not control her temper. Phil tells Lola that he will get her back where she belongs. Lola is happy until she discovers that Phil wants custody but she eventually agrees to Phil's plan. Phil comes up with a plan for Lola to marry Ben and conspires with Billy, who is against the idea. Lola refuses to marry Ben and Phil plans to tell Ben the truth about Lexi, against Lola's wishes. Phil does not tell Ben but agrees to help Lola so asks Sharon Rickman (Letitia Dean) to pretend to be his partner to help get Lexi. She refuses initially but agrees until she finds out that Lola does not know about the plan, angering Lola until Phil explains his reasons to her. Alexa drops the assault charge but Lola is devastated to learn that she will not get Lexi back. Lola worries that Phil's plan will fail after he tells Social Services that he and Sharon are no longer engaged, but Phil does become Lexi's kinship foster carer. Lola is devastated to learn that she will still only have three access visits a week, and Phil starts being controlling, calling Lexi "his" baby and not allowing Lola to provide for her. Phil also tells Lola who she can be friends with, disapproving of her friendship with Dexter Hartman (Khali Best). Phil decides to take Lexi on holiday so Lola seeks legal advice but agrees that Lexi can go. Lola makes a request in court to increase her access visits with Lexi, and Trish states that Lola has made good progress but Phil's lawyer tells the court that Lola is often late, brings age-inappropriate toys and is unable to handle Lexi's tears. The judge rules that Lexi will stay with Phil as kinship foster carer. Billy goes to speak to Phil, while Lola listens and hears Phil say that he will never give Lexi back voluntarily so Lola snatches Lexi and leaves. Phil, Billy and Sharon spend the rest of the day looking for her, eventually finding her at a playground. Lola goes home and Phil asks her to meet him later at his house. Trish is there and asks them if their relationship has broken down but Phil tells her that he is responsible for recent events and agrees to work with Lola to make the transition for Lexi to return to living with Lola as easy as possible. When Trish leaves, Phil allows Lola to look after Lexi, and starts giving her increased access. Phil is impressed when Lola acts calmly when Lexi is taken ill with suspected meningitis, though she is fine.

Lola notices that Sharon is acting strangely and finds her passed out when she should be with Lexi. When Sharon regains consciousness, she admits that she is addicted to painkillers and tells Lola that if she tells Phil, Lexi will go back into care. Phil also later catches Sharon unconscious and when she comes round, he confronts her and throws her out. Just before the final hearing to decide if Lexi should be returned to Lola, Phil learns that Lola knew about Sharon's drug addiction and calls her a bad mother before leaving the court building. However, Billy convinces him to do the right thing, and Lola is successful in getting Lexi back.

Lola develops feelings for Peter Beale (Ben Hardy), but the feud between his family, the Beales, and her family, the Mitchells, make them anxious about being together. However, they eventually force Phil and Peter's father Ian to accept their relationship. Peter moves in with Lola, Lexi and Billy and pressures her to start a career in childcare when she loses her job at the local salon. Despite agreeing to do the course, Lola starts her own business doing the locals manicures and pedicures and loves it. She becomes closer to Jay and admits how Peter makes her feel that she is not good enough for him. After an argument with Peter, Lola turns to Jay for support and he tries to kiss her. Horrified, she goes to run off but as she steps out into the road she is accidentally run over by Ronnie Mitchell (Samantha Womack). She is immediately rushed to hospital, where she is told she has concussion, but is discharged the following day.

Following the murder of Peter's twin sister Lucy (see Who Killed Lucy Beale?), Lola struggles to support him as he in turn is struggling to support Ian and the rest of his family. When Lucy's memory is tarnished in a Walford Gazette article, Lola approaches them and gives them an article of content of what she believes will paint Lucy in a much better light. However, her words are twisted and Peter believes that Lola did it just for the money. Peter ends his relationship with her, and moves home to Ian. After Lucy's funeral Peter moves back home with Lola and Lexi. Peter begins developing feelings for his ex-girlfriend, Lauren Branning (Jacqueline Jossa), despite her relationship with Dean Wicks (Matt Di Angelo). Peter ends his relationship with Lola after admitting he kissed Lauren. Although Lola wants to make the relationship work, Peter still declines and begins a relationship with Lauren after she dumps Dean. In September 2014, Ben (now played by Harry Reid) returns to the square for Phil's wedding to Sharon. Billy and Jay hide Lola after Phil wants Ben to meet Lexi and tell Phil that she is visiting an ill friend. A few weeks later, Lola returns to see Phil; however, she comes face to face with Ben.

While Lola is in the pub with Jay, Ben and Abi walk in and Lola is confused as to why Abi is being so cold. Ben walks over to Lola insisting she is a good mother and he doesn't want to take Lexi away. When helping Johnny Carter (Sam Strike) at The Albert, Lola insists she has nothing to do with Abi and Jay's break up and begins making friends with her. Abi then tells her that she is in a relationship with Ben, causing Lola to be confused and worried, so Abi becomes defensive and think Lola is stealing Ben away. Jay invites Lola to The Queen Vic where Abi tells Lola that Jay only invited her to get back at her. After Jay reveals that Ben tried to kiss him, Lola walks out of The Queen Vic and Ben denies his accusations. Lola questions if Jay was using her to try to make Abi jealous, but Jay reveals to Lola that he still has feelings for her. When Jay tries to kiss Lola, she rejects him, telling him that she does not feel the same way about him. Lola is excited when her boss Dean asks her out to discuss her future at Blades hair salon and dresses nicely, but Dean's concerned mother, Shirley Carter (Linda Henry), sends her away, worrying about Dean's reputation.

Lola is frustrated when newcomer Paul Coker (Jonny Labey) accidentally knocks her over in the street, but they become colleagues. Dean sacks Lola for being absent but Phil gives Shirley a large amount of money to secure Lola's job. Following Ben's arrest on suspicion of murdering Lucy, Jay is worried he will be arrested as well after he reveals that Ben mugged Lucy on the night of her death. Lola comforts and reassures him and then they kiss, leading to sex. They then start a relationship. Jay tells Lola he wants to leave because Phil has given the police Lucy's incriminating purse and phone with fingerprints on it. She is upset but Jay suggests she goes with him, which she does, taking Lexi with them. Jay calls Billy and reveals that he, Lola and Lexi are moving to Newcastle with Dexter. She returns briefly with Jay to collect more belongings, but Billy tries to convince her to stay and let Jay go to Newcastle alone, but Lola refuses. Billy tells Lola he is going to collect his daughter Janet Mitchell (Grace) so that they can all share their goodbyes, but Billy reports Jay to the police and he is arrested for robbery. Lola realises that Billy reported Jay moments after Jay's arrest, so Lola leaves for the train station with Lexi. Billy attempts to convince Lola to stay in Walford, but she says she could have a better life somewhere else and that she wants him to be proud of her. Billy and Lola share an emotional farewell and Lola leaves for Newcastle, taking Lexi with her. Although Jay plans to join her eventually, Lola later ends the relationship because she is now dating Dexter.

=== 2019–2023 ===
Lola returns to Walford in April 2019 along with Lexi and Ben. When the Mitchells have a celebratory drink in The Queen Vic, Jay and Lola have conversation in which Lola reveals she and Dexter are no longer together. It is revealed that Lola and Ben are only back to con Phil, and Ben promises to give both Lola and Lexi some of the money. Lola reunites with Jay and they almost start dating again; however, it is revealed that Lola is engaged to Ewan (Riley Jones). Jay rejects Lola and she decides to move back to Newcastle with Ewan, but Ben manipulates the situation and Ewan leaves Walford. Lola tries to get Billy back with Honey Mitchell (Emma Barton) and schemes to break up Honey and her boyfriend Adam Bateman (Stephen Rahman-Hughes), although she is unsuccessful. She starts working as an events manager with Jay's girlfriend Ruby Allen (Louisa Lytton); however, they eventually clash. Lola becomes aware of Ben's scheming and warns him to end them, otherwise she will leave with Lexi. After Ben's plans to swindle Phil are exposed, Lola decides to remain in Walford and starts working as a hairdresser for Denise Fox (Diane Parish). During The Queen Vic siege where Hunter Owen (Charlie Winter) takes the residents hostage, Lola and Jay are locked in the bathroom together where they admit their feelings for each other and reconcile.

Lola is shocked when she falls pregnant with Jay's baby in March 2020. Jay is stunned when she insists for an abortion, proclaiming that it is too soon for them to have their first child together. Their relationship hits the rocks when Jay proposes to Lola and she assumes he is only proposing to convince her to keep the baby. After a bitter row, Lola secretly has sex with Peter (now Dayle Hudson), who has recently returned from New Zealand. She goes to her abortion appointment alone and is surprised afterwards by Jay, who tells her that he only wants her to be happy, which prompts them to reconcile. However, Jay notices tension between a flirtatious Peter and anxious Lola at Stuart (Ricky Champ) and Rainie Highway's (Tanya Franks) wedding. During a confrontation, Lola confesses to her one-night stand with Peter, resulting in Jay ending the relationship. Lola is later furious to learn that Jay and Honey have begun a relationship and forces them to tell Billy; he, however, refuses to speak to Lola after learning that she already knew about the relationship. Lola is set up on a date with Isaac Baptiste (Stevie Basaula) by Kim Fox (Tameka Empson), which is met with opposition from his mother, Sheree Trueman (Suzette Llewellyn). Initially believing Sheree's hostility is because she does not think she is good enough for her son, Lola is later stunned when Isaac reveals that the real reason is because he has schizophrenia. Lola is accepting of this, and supports Isaac. However, he later leaves the Square and Lola is angry when she discovers that he is dating someone else only days later.

After being attacked during a siege at Peggy's wine bar in September 2022, Lola and Jay reignite their relationship after Honey dumps Jay. In October, after experiencing headaches and dizziness, Lola suffers a seizure at the community centre during Lexi's dancing competition. She is taken to hospital where she is diagnosed with a highly aggressive glioblastoma brain tumor, which is later confirmed to be terminal. Following surgery, Lola is told that a portion of the tumour is inoperable due to its location within the brain. At Christmas, Jay proposes to Lola but she initially refuses as she is concerned that Jay would not be able to take care of her, but both later agree to get married. In January 2023, Lola decides that she wants to reconcile with her mother before she dies, but dismisses the idea shortly afterwards. After having a brief health scare before her wedding, Lola is taken to the hospital by Kim but arrives at the registry office in time to marry Jay. Billy tracks down Lola's mother, Emma Harding (Patsy Kensit), in an attempt for her to attend Lola's wedding, and although she initially rules out playing a role in Lola's life, she starts to meet with Lola at the salon under the pseudonym Nicole. Following several visits to the salon, as well as posting a large sum of money through her letterbox, Lola realises that Nicole is actually Emma, her mother. After a tense confrontation, Lola forgives Emma for the past and they reconcile.

Lola is informed that she has six months to live. This prompts Emma to leave in grief and claims that she is being offered a job in America. Lola continues to work at the salon but as her condition worsens, she decides to quit. Lola then collapses following her leaving party at the salon, where later she is told that the cancer is advancing rapidly and she now has weeks to live. Lola asks Billy to assist in her suicide. Whilst Billy initially refuses, he later agrees to help her, although order Lola to tell Jay first. After Lola has a dream about being back in Margate, her childhood home, she pleads to Jay to take her there one last time. Jay breaks Lola out of hospital and they travel to Margate where they both reminisce about the past. Lola informs Jay about her plans to die on her own terms, but Jay objects and they argue. After hearing Lola's pleas, Jay accepts her decision, but tells her that he wishes to help her instead of Billy. After realising that she would be setting a bad example for Lexi, Lola decides to die naturally. In her final days, Lola's condition worsens after suffering seizures and losing consciousness and the ability to speak. Ben flies out to America to find a preliminary drug trial to help prolong Lola's life. Billy is arrested for vandalising the Minute Mart after Nish Panesar (Navin Chowdhry) teases him over Lola's declining health; however, he is later released after Nish drops the charges. Lola's family and friends say their goodbyes, and Lola dies peacefully at dawn with Jay and Lexi at her bedside.

Following her death, Jay and Ben open Lola's memory box for Lexi, which Lola made before she died. Jay, Ben and Lexi watch a video from a tablet where Lola says one last goodbye to Lexi. Billy and Jay also visit Lola's body at the chapel of rest. At her funeral, she appears in a video created by Lexi which is shown to the mourners. After the funeral, Lexi gives Jay a USB stick, containing a video of Lola talking to Lexi about how special Jay is to her and how he is the love of her life. Jay breaks down as the video ends.

Lola would later appear through other videos she recorded before her death, including a message for Lexi on her first day at secondary school in September 2023 and then a couple of Christmas messages in December 2023. It later transpires that a devastated Ben committed credit card fraud in the United States to try and save Lola's life and he is later arrested, extradited, and sentenced to six years in prison.

== Reception ==
Harold's debut episode was watched by 7.68 million viewers. Harold said that because of her performance as Lola she had received letters from children who had grown up in care homes, saying how much they love her character. Kate Woodward of Inside Soap said Lola's introduction had been a revelation. Woodward also commented on Harold's performance saying "In actress Danielle Harold, EastEnders have found a young star with enormous charisma, so you like Lola even though she's a nightmare! In the coming weeks, we'll see her really hold her own with the other Mitchells – which is no mean feat when you consider that most of them have been in this show for years." Woodward's colleague, Sarah, said she liked what she saw, after Lola's debut and described the character saying "She's got a surly attitude, and acts like she's tough as old boots. But something tells me that underneath that hard exterior is a lost little girl just waiting for someone to finally take her into the heart of their family."

Tony Stewart, writing for the Daily Mirror, described Lola as "a walking 15-year-old Asbo", he added "in little less than a month on the Square, the spirited Lola has already created havoc. [...] With Danielle Harold already tipped as a best newcomer in the next round of soap awards, stroppy Lola is either brave or stupid in taking on Phil." Metro's Christopher Hooton commented negatively on Harold's performance as Lola saying "Lola kept her world record attempt for worst acting in a soap going strong". Hooton's fellow writer, Rachel Tarley, said Harold's acting skills were "terrible" when Julie departed. During the love triangle storyline, Tarley said Lola was an "inept teenage seductresses." Co-star Perry Fenwick said that Harold is an "amazing" actress. A writer for Bang Showbiz branded Lola a "blonde babe".

=== Response to social worker storyline ===
The scenes where Trish Barnes takes Lexi from Lola were criticised by the charity The Who Cares? Trust on Twitter, who called the storyline an "unhelpful portrayal" and said it had already received calls from members of the public who were "distressed about the EastEnders scene where a social worker snatches a baby from its mother's arms". The scenes were also condemned by the British Association of Social Workers (BASW), calling the BBC "too lazy and arrogant" to correctly portray the child protection process, and saying that the baby was taken "without sufficient grounds to do so". Bridget Robb, acting chief of the BASW, said the storyline provoked "real anger among a profession well used to a less than accurate public and media perception of their jobs". She stated:

"It is disgraceful to see a publicly funded broadcaster deliberately spreading misinformation about the child protection process because it is too lazy and arrogant to get it right. We regularly give advice to programmes about social work storylines; we would like to know who advised EastEnders so badly. Social workers have a difficult enough job as it is. Unlike the writers and actors on EastEnders, they have to step through those front doors that no one else wants to step through, and they do it on a daily basis, to protect children, not to target families. EastEnders' shabby portrayal of an entire profession has made a tough job even tougher."

Another social worker said "Accurate procedures were not followed [when a character's baby was taken away]. Was it police protection, section 20? Where was the immediate risk to the baby? As a social worker, I was in tears, as was a colleague of mine, watching how our profession was portrayed on television." The BBC responded to BASW by saying:

" • We understand you're unhappy with the current storyline concerning Lexi and Lola as you feel it portrays social workers inaccurately. We consulted with the programme's production team in writing our response and we'd like to assure you our intention is not to portray social workers in a negative light.
• Whilst the audience has seen how much Lola loves Lexi and how responsible she can be with her baby, we were careful to ensure that when the social worker was visiting, she generally saw only more worrying behaviour. Lola was often abrasive when speaking to the social worker and casual—sometimes even flippant in her responses to the social worker's suggestions.
• Given that Lola is a young mother, who has been, until this episode, wearing an electronic tag (for criminal damage to the car lot), with a history of getting into trouble with the police, and is known to have had a difficult childhood herself (indeed, three generations of the family have been through the care system), it was clearly important for social services to be involved with the family in order to ensure that Lola could cope with having a baby. In the last few weeks the social worker witnessed a series of unfortunate incidents, including Lexi wearing a tea-towel as a makeshift nappy, reports of Lola not taking Lexi to the mother and baby group, a messy and unclean flat, and the discovery that Billy had lied to her about having a job.
• Under the circumstances, we believe the audience will have understood why she had to act to remove Lexi quickly when the allegation of assault is made against Lola by Alexa. There was no suggestion that the social worker's actions were anything other than a genuine desire to protect Lexi, or that her concerns about Lola were unreasonable, given the picture she and the previous social worker had formed over a substantial period of time. There was certainly no inference that her actions were anything personal against Lola or her family."

A social worker who received the BBC's statement commented:

"I don't think I need to spell out the ridiculousness of this response from the BBC and whether the grounds they claim, such as wearing a tea towel as a nappy, would constitute grounds for emergency removal in real life. I work in a long-term care team and take great offence at the suggestion that because Lola was in care there is an assumption that social services should be involved in her care of her child. Not that I am suggesting she doesn't need some support, but where is her aftercare worker? I am always disappointed at how social workers are portrayed in EastEnders, but this was the last resort. I do not agree that the public will think that this was reasonable and it just makes our job harder."

In November 2012, Irish politician Robert Troy expressed concerns that the storyline could influence the result of an upcoming referendum on children's rights. Troy said, "Quite a few times I have been asked about a storyline on EastEnders where a young mother has had her child taken into care and has faced a very difficult battle to get access to the child. People have been emotionally affected by the story and have a real concern about the sort of heavy-handed state intervention that's portrayed."

Kate White from Inside Soap praised the storyline, saying, "Here you are teasing us all with endless mystery secrets and secret mysteries, yet the best storyline you have is hiding nothing at all! The simple tail of a young mum's love for her baby is heart-breaking and dramatic. All credit to actress Danielle Harold for being so brilliant as Lola. [...] Keep on keeping it simple."

=== Response to brain tumour storyline ===
Although the decision to kill Lola off was initially met with immense criticism, the brain tumour storyline, the performances from Harold, Borthwick and Fenwick, and the handling of Lola's death received critical acclaim from fans and media critics alike. At the 2023 British Soap Awards in June 2023, "Loving and Losing Lola" received a nomination for Best Storyline, while Harold was also nominated for Best Dramatic Performance; however, she lost out to Charlotte Jordan, who portrays Daisy Midgeley in Coronation Street, who had been starring at the centre of a controversial acid attack storyline. Both Harold and Borthwick were also nominated for the Best Leading Performer award, which Harold eventually won for her portrayal of Lola throughout the brain tumour storyline. During her acceptance speech, Harold made the statement:

"This [award] isn't for me. This is definitely for every single person who has worked with me along the way; that has been directly affected by brain tumours; people that are suffering from brain tumours. Their time has been so precious to them, and even more to me, and I can't thank all of you enough for helping me and giving me your time. Kylie, thank you so much. And I just want to say thank you to the best cast to ever be able to work with - I love you all so much, and I can't thank you all enough. And thank you for trusting me to do this storyline. I literally don't know what to say, but I just want to say thank you to all the charities as well. Brain Tumour Research – you deserve this. Thank you so much."

EastEnders triumphed at the awards ceremony by winning the award for Best British Soap, with many critics attributing Lola's brain tumour storyline to the show's resurgence and success. In May 2023, Harold was nominated for Serial Drama Performance at the 28th National Television Awards, and later won the award at the annual ceremony in September 2023. In July 2023, Harold received a nomination for Best Actress at the 2023 Inside Soap Awards, with Borthwick also being nominated for Best Actor and "Loving and Losing Lola" being nominated for Best Storyline.
