= Jamie Borthwick =

English actor (born 1994)

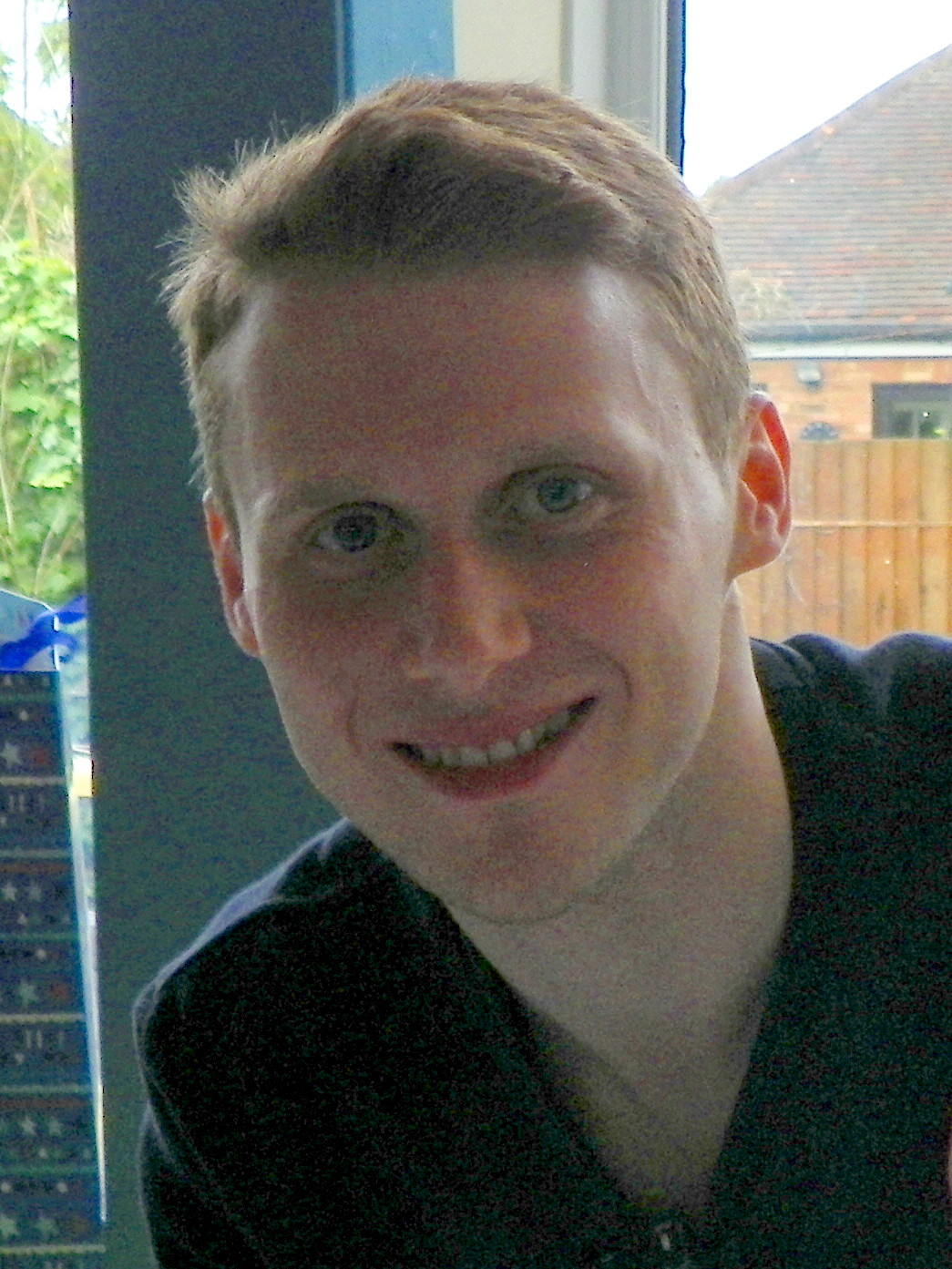
- Borthwick in 2016
- Born: Jamie Simon Borthwick; 23 June 1994 (age 32); Barking, London, England
- Occupation: Actor
- Years active: 2005–present
- Known for: Role of Jay Brown in EastEnders

Jamie Simon Borthwick (born 23 June 1994) is an English actor. He rose to prominence for his portrayal of Jay Brown in the BBC soap opera EastEnders, in which he appeared from 2006 to 2025. For his portrayal of the character, he won the British Soap Award for Best Dramatic Performance from a Young Actor or Actress in 2008. He was a contestant on the twenty-second series of Strictly Come Dancing in 2024, after winning the Christmas Special the previous year.

== Early life ==
Borthwick was born on 23 June 1994 in Barking, London to Sharon (née Thomas) and Simon Borthwick. The oldest of three children, he has two younger sisters, Samantha and Charlee. He attended Sylvia Young Theatre School until he was 16.

== Career ==
Borthwick's first appearance on television was as an orphan in the Celebrate Oliver! musical alongside Shane Richie and Joseph McManners in December 2005. The following year, Borthwick had a minor role in the BBC sitcom Not Going Out. He was subsequently cast as Jay Brown in the BBC soap opera EastEnders and made his first appearance in December 2006. He also appeared in an episode of Gina's Laughing Gear in 2007. Borthwick won the award for "Best Dramatic Performance from a Young Actor or Actress" at the 2008 British Soap Awards for his portrayal of Jay and dedicated it to his late grandmother, who died one day prior to his win.

In December 2023, Borthwick took part in the Strictly Come Dancing 2023 Christmas Special. He was paired with professional dancer Nancy Xu and the couple danced a quickstep, achieving the maximum 40 points from the judges and winning the competition. The following year, he was announced as a contestant on the twenty-second series of the main show and was paired with professional dancer Michelle Tsiakkas. They were the ninth couple to be eliminated in the tenth week.

In June 2025, Borthwick was suspended from EastEnders by the BBC after a backstage video from Strictly Come Dancing in November 2024, surfaced showing him referring to the inhabitants of Blackpool by using ableist language considered derogatory toward disabled individuals. The BBC described his language as "entirely unacceptable" and said it did not reflect their values or standards. He issued a public apology in a statement to The Sun on Sunday, expressing regret for his words and acknowledging the offence they had caused. In September 2025, it was announced that Borthwick had been axed from the soap after 19 years, and would not return from his suspension.

== Personal life ==
Borthwick carried boxer Kevin Mitchell's championship belt into the boxing ring prior to a bout in July 2007. He is a second cousin to former EastEnders co-star Charlie Winter, who played Hunter Owen. Borthwick supports Premier League football club West Ham United F.C.. In January 2019, it was announced that he would be running the London Marathon with some of his EastEnders co-stars for a dementia campaign in honour of Barbara Windsor.

In May 2021, Borthwick was caught speeding in Romford, and he was subsequently given a driving ban. His lawyer appealed the ban, stating that Borthwick is recognised while using public transport, and "not all of these encounters are favourable". The ban was subsequently removed.

== Filmography ==
Year	Title	Role	Notes	Ref(s)
2005	Celebrate Oliver!	Orphan	Television film	
2006	Not Going Out	Aggressive Boy / Young Chav	2 episodes	
2006–2025	EastEnders	Jay Brown	Regular role	
2007	Gina's Laughing Gear	Boy	Episode: "Driving Me Mad"	
2010	East Street	Jay Brown	Charity crossover between Coronation Street and EastEnders	
2013	Jedward's Big Adventure	Himself	Episode: "Cheddar Gorge"	
2013	12 Again	Himself	Episode: "EastEnders"	
2014, 2015, 2017	This Morning	Himself	Guest; 3 episodes	
2018	Pointless Celebrities	Himself	Contestant; 1 episode	
2019	Soccer AM	Himself	Guest; 2 episodes	
2020	We Love Only Fools and Horses	Himself	Documentary; 1 episode	
2023	The One Show	Himself	Guest; 1 episode	
2023	Strictly Come Dancing	Himself	Winner; 2023 Christmas Special	
2024	Strictly Come Dancing	Himself	Contestant; series 22	
2024	The Chase: Celebrity Special	Himself	Contestant; 1 episode	
2025	The Hit List	Himself	Contestant; 1 episode	

== Awards and nominations ==
Year	Award	Role	Category	Result	Ref.
2007	Inside Soap Awards	Jay Brown EastEnders	Best Young Actor	Nominated	
2008	Digital Spy Soap Awards	Jay Brown EastEnders	Best Child Actor (Under 16)	Nominated	
2008	The British Soap Awards	Jay Brown EastEnders	Best Dramatic Performance from a Young Actor or Actress	Won	
2008	Inside Soap Awards	Jay Brown EastEnders	Best Young Actor	Nominated	
2009	Inside Soap Awards	Jay Brown EastEnders	Best Young Actor	Nominated	
2016	Digital Spy Reader Awards	Jay Brown EastEnders	Biggest Unsung Hero	Second	
2022	Digital Spy Reader Awards	Jay Brown EastEnders	Best Soap Actor (Male)	Won	
2023	British Soap Awards	Jay Brown EastEnders	Best Leading Performer	Nominated	
2023	British Soap Awards	Jay Brown Lola Pearce EastEnders	Best On-Screen Partnership (with Danielle Harold)	Shortlisted	
2023	Inside Soap Awards	Jay Brown EastEnders	Best Actor	Won	
2023	TVTimes Awards	Jay Brown EastEnders	Favourite Soap Actor	Nominated	
2023	Digital Spy Reader Awards	Jay Brown Lola Pearce EastEnders	Best Soap Couple (with Danielle Harold)	Second	
2024	TV Choice Awards	Jay Brown EastEnders	Best Soap Actor	Shortlisted	
