= Abi Branning =

Fictional character from EastEnders

- EastEnders character
- Portrayed by: Lorna Fitzgerald
- Duration: 2006–2018
- First appearance: Episode 3180; 3 July 2006
- Last appearance: Episode 5641; 19 January 2018
- Created by: Simon Ashdown
- Introduced by: Kate Harwood
- Spin-off appearances: Dorothy Branning: The Next Chapter (2013)
In-universe information
- Other names: Abigail Branning
- Occupation: Student; Waitress; Veterinary receptionist; Kitchen assistant
- Family: Branning
- Father: Max Branning
- Mother: Tanya Branning
- Stepfather: Greg Jessop
- Stepmother: Kirsty Branning
- Brothers: Oscar Branning
- Sisters: Lauren Branning
- Half-brothers: Bradley Branning
- Half-sisters: Annie Carter
- Daughters: Abi Branning
- Grandfathers: Jim Branning; Bill Cross
- Grandmothers: Reenie Branning; Cora Cross
- Uncles: Jack Branning; Derek Branning
- Aunts: Carol Jackson; Suzy Branning; April Branning; Rainie Cross; Ava Hartman
- Nephews: Louie Beale; Jimmy Beale
- First cousins: Bianca Jackson; Robbie Jackson; Sonia Fowler; Billie Jackson; Joey Branning; Alice Branning; Dexter Hartman; Amy Mitchell; Ricky Branning; Penny Branning; James Branning; Kevin; Rebecca
- Other relatives: Liam Butcher; Tiffany Butcher; Morgan Butcher; Bex Fowler; Julia Fowler; Sami Jackson; Charli Slater

Abi Branning is a fictional character from the BBC soap opera EastEnders, played by Lorna Fitzgerald. She was introduced by executive producer Kate Harwood on 3 July 2006 as an extension to the Branning family, along with father Max Branning (Jake Wood), mother Tanya Branning (Jo Joyner) and older sister Lauren Branning (Madeline Duggan/Jacqueline Jossa). Her storylines involve her friendships and relationships with Ben Mitchell (Charlie Jones/Joshua Pascoe/Harry Reid) and Jay Brown (Jamie Borthwick), her toxic friendship with Babe Smith (Annette Badland), faking a pregnancy so that Ben would not leave her for Paul Coker (Jonny Labey), being a suspect in the murder of Lucy Beale (Hetti Bywater), her affair with Lauren's fiancé, Steven Beale (Aaron Sidwell), and falling pregnant by him.

In September 2017, it was announced that Fitzgerald and Jossa had been axed by executive consultant John Yorke. Abi's exit storyline involved her and Lauren falling from the roof of The Queen Victoria public house on Christmas Day 2017, leading to Abi giving birth prematurely to her daughter, Abi Branning Jr, and being confirmed brainstem dead in later episodes. Abi's final scenes aired on 19 January 2018 after her life support is withdrawn. The character's funeral took place on 16 February 2018.

For her portrayal as Abi, Fitzgerald was nominated for Best Young Actor at the 2010 Inside Soap Awards, and went on to win Best Dramatic Performance from a Young Actor or Actress at the 2012 British Soap Awards. Kate White of Inside Soap praised her portrayal of Abi, saying that Fitzgerald is the "brightest young star in soap", adding "Abi's destined for great dramatic things". A writer from the Western Mail said that Abi's relationship with Jay Brown (Jamie Borthwick) is "Walford's answer to Romeo and Juliet". However, some critics were less positive, with one saying in 2012 that the audience were "not nearly" seeing as much of the "classic characters" due to the younger cast receiving more screen time.

== Character creation and development ==
=== Introduction and characterisation ===
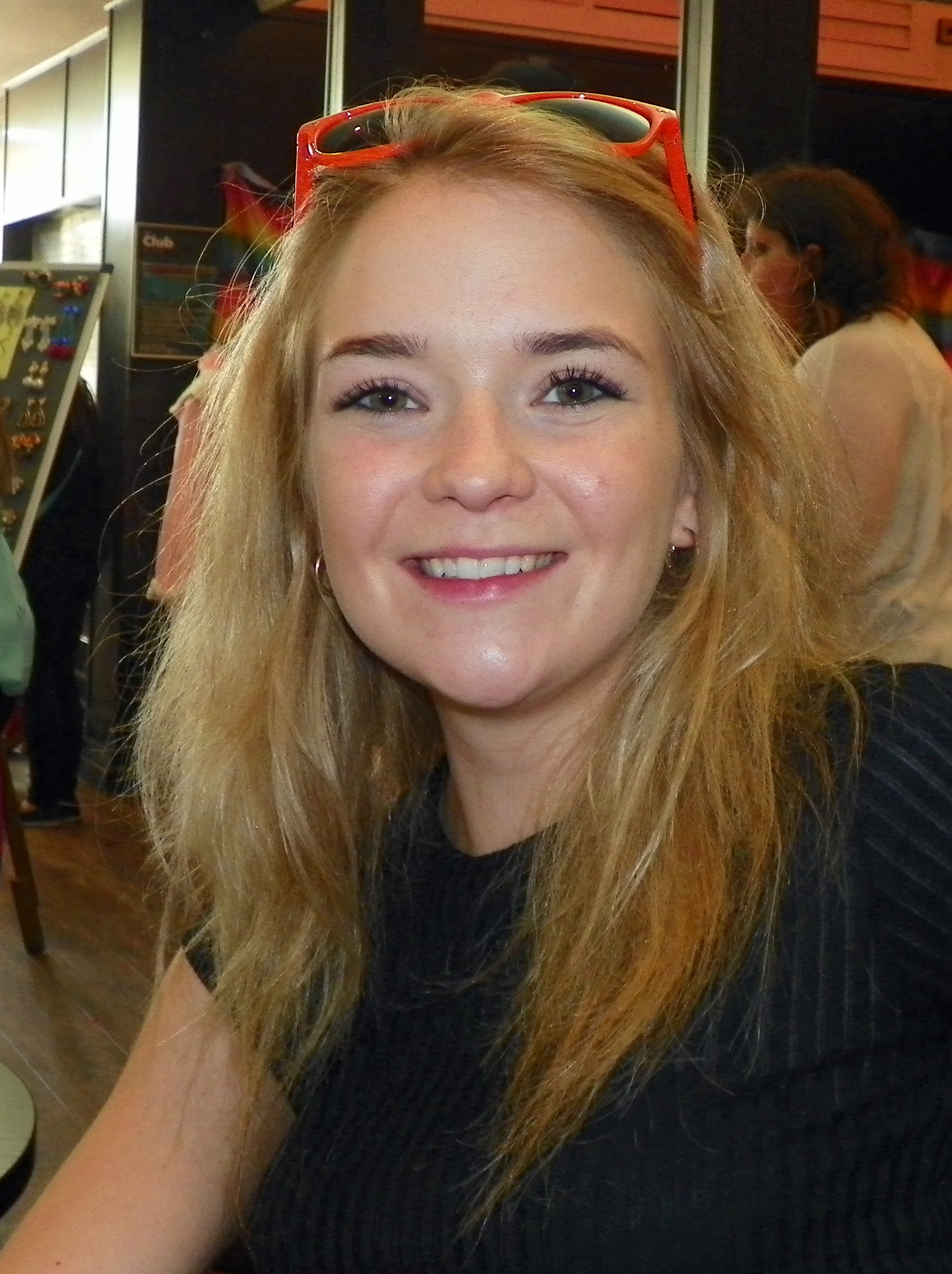
Fitzgerald (pictured in 2016) was cast as Abi after three auditions.

Abi was introduced into the series in 2006, by executive producer Kate Harwood. The character and her casting was announced on 25 May 2006. She and her immediate family, father Max (Wood), mother Tanya (Joyner) and older sister Lauren (Duggan, recast to Jossa in 2010), are an extension of the Branning family, who have appeared in EastEnders since 1993. Fitzgerald, in her first major television role, began filming for the soap in May 2006 and made her first on-screen appearance in July. Fitzgerald's mother commented on her daughter's casting: "Personally, I feel I want to show how proud we are of her and to thank everyone who has prayed for her and helped her in any way. At first, it is just the look they go for. Then it is more intensive and she had to read from a script. By the second audition, she was still up against 60 or 70 people. You start thinking about it when she gets to the third audition, but when the agent rang up and said she had got the part it was an overwhelming feeling. You don't know what it means until that point". Fitzgerald was offered the part about three months after her final audition. As Fitzgerald was only 10 years old when she got the part, she was required to balance her filming requirements with schooling in Northampton, and learning lines. In 2012, she told Inside Soap that she thought she had messed up her audition, and did not realise how big the show was until she was older. In 2014, she told BBC Radio 1 that when she met Wood and Joyner, her on-screen parents, she realised it did not matter that she had messed up her lines in her last audition, because she looked like them both. Fitzgerald was required to cry on her first day of filming, and admitted in 2014 that this was embarrassing, and she was unable to produce tears, but was "just making noises". Fitzgerald was chaperoned by her mother until she was 16.

She may be young, but she's packed plenty of drama into her years. She's been hit by Deano's car, watched her parents' marriage unravel, ravel, unravel again etc. She also discovered Trina's dead body in Charlie's summer-house. Most kids would have nightmares for weeks after a sighting like that. Water off a duck's back when you're Derek Branning's niece, though.

— The BBC on Abi.

Abi has been described by the official EastEnders website as the family's "golden girl" compared to Lauren, hinting that she knows how to get her own way. She has been described as "bubbly" and "self-assured" with a nose for mischief. She has also been described as having the biggest heart in Walford, bringing out the best in the people around her. Jane Simon of the Daily Mirror said that Abi is a "real soft touch". Jon Wise from The People said that after Abi received a makeover in 2010, she "actually turned out to be quite pretty". In 2012, Fitzgerald told Inside Soap's Laura-Jane Tyler that Abi has grown up in her first six years on screen, and is now sensible, "like a mother hen" and has had to mature quickly because of the dramatic situations she has been involved in. Tyler added that Abi is the most level-headed and sensible member of the Branning family and "puts her [family] to shame with her mature approach to [their problems]."

=== Early development ===
Abi's earlier storylines consist of her parents fighting for custody of her and her siblings, being injured in a collision with Deano Wicks' (Di Angelo) car and helping her friend Ben (Jones) with his abuse from stepmother Stella Crawford (Thompson) In February 2011, Abi was involved in a car accident with Max and would suffer severe injuries after their car collides with a lorry on the way to Tanya's wedding to her new partner Greg (Booth). The crash scenes were filmed on 6 March 2011 and aired on 14 April 2011. After these minor storylines, Joyner said that Fitzgerald should be involved in more complex storylines in 2012. She said, "I think it's going to be an exciting year for Lorna. She's been a natural on the show ever since she was younger, and I think she's one of our best actresses. What's lovely about this year is that she'll be doing her GCSEs, and then once that's out of the way, she can get something that's a bit heavier and a bit bigger. She'll be old enough to work longer hours, so I think they'd be mad if they didn't give her something to sink her teeth into at some point this year".

In November 2010, after sister Lauren was recast to Jossa, Jossa stated that she enjoys working with Fitzgerald, adding the two have a lot in common. Jossa, in 2012, wanted Lauren and Abi to bond more. She commented: "I think realistically they would when they're going through a family problem like this. It would bring the family a little bit closer. I think they are quite close already and they have a lot of family banter! They may not like each other as people, but they love each other as family". In December 2012, Fitzgerald conducted her first magazine interview and spoke of a storyline where Abi comforts Lauren over a relationship break up, saying "It's nice to see the little [sister] taking care of the bigger one."

=== Jay Brown and Ben Mitchell ===
In March 2011, Abi starts a relationship with Jay (Jamie Borthwick). Borthwick admitted that he is enjoying filming Jay and Abi's relationship. Speaking of Jay and Abi's relationship, Borthwick told Inside Soap, "I think Abi and Jay are a good couple," he said. "Jay's a right one – he's already had a crack at Abi's sister Lauren and now he's going for the younger one. He's got an eye for the Branning women". Fitzgerald said that Jay and Abi are "cute together" but she cringes at Abi because she is "lovey-dovey". The couple split in 2014 and Abi begins a relationship with Ben, knowing that he is gay but dismissing this and branding it a "phase". Speaking of his role, newcomer Harry Reid stated that Ben would "manipulate" Abi in his attempts to prove that he is straight.

=== Departure ===
On 10 September 2017, it was announced that Fitzgerald had been axed from the show by executive consultant John Yorke, along with Jacqueline Jossa. A spokesperson said: "We can confirm Jacqueline and Lorna will be leaving. They have been wonderful to work with and we wish them all the best for the future." Fitzgerald's final episode was broadcast on 19 January 2018, in which the character dies. At the end of the episode, instead of the usual closing title sequence, the image, focused on Abi's face, fades to black and no theme music is played.

== Storylines ==
Abi moves to Albert Square with her parents Max (Jake Wood) and Tanya Branning (Jo Joyner), and sister Lauren Branning (Madeline Duggan), where she befriends Ben Mitchell (Charlie Jones). Soon after, when Max's affair with his son Bradley Branning's (Charlie Clements) wife, Stacey Slater (Lacey Turner), is revealed, Max and Tanya separate and eventually divorce. Abi begins to live sporadically with each parent, frequently defending Max to Tanya and Lauren, until Max and Tanya reunite, however Abi leaves with Tanya after learning of Max's financial problems. Abi starts to take an interest in Max's lodger Darren Miller (Charlie G. Hawkins), who is left uncomfortable when she tries to kiss him, telling her she is too young. She later develops a crush on Jay Brown (Jamie Borthwick), and the two begin dating. Jay and Abi cuddle up as they are watching television, but Max believes they are about to have sex, so he throws Jay out and rips Abi's bridesmaid dress to Greg and Tanya's wedding. They go to buy a new one, but they have a car crash on Greg and Tanya's wedding day. They suffer minor injuries and both recover. Despite Abi's insecurities over Jay's friendship with Lola Pearce (Danielle Harold), she and Jay remain together, and eventually Max comes to accept them as a couple.

Jay proposes to Abi and she accepts, but she is faced with a dilemma when she is offered the chance to go to Costa Rica to help with sea turtle conservation. Jay gives Abi an ultimatum, threatening to break up with her if she goes to Costa Rica, but she goes regardless. She returns weeks later and the pair reconcile. Abi meets her cousin Dexter Hartman (Khali Best), not knowing they are related, and this causes Jay to be jealous until the truth of their relationship is revealed. Abi tries to support Lauren (now played by Jacqueline Jossa) with her drinking problem, however, this ends badly when Lauren destroys Abi's revision notes. Max is framed for causing a car crash that leaves Phil Mitchell (Steve McFadden) hospitalised. Abi and Lauren struggle to pay Max's legal costs, as well as their bills. Abi receives her exam results and discovers she has not gained the grades to go to university to become a vet, but Lauren, believing that Abi has passed the exams, throws a party, during which Abi blurts out that she blames Lauren for her poor results because she has an alcohol problem. Abi decides to continue studying, but when Max goes to prison, she has to take a job and struggles to find time for her studies. Max is proven innocent and returns home to support his family. In an argument between Jay and Dexter, Abi discovers that on a holiday, Jay kissed a barmaid. She also finds out that Lola knew and furiously confronts her. However, after a heart-to-heart with Jay, they decide to work through their issues and she fixes things with Dexter and Lola as well. She also takes in a stray dog, Tramp.

Abi's final A-Level results come through and she tells everyone that she has got what she needed to get into the University of Liverpool. However, she later confides in Jay that she has been lying, as not to disappoint her family. He encourages her to go through clearing and she gets a position doing a similar course at the University of Bolton. Jay decides to go with Abi. Ben returns from prison and reveals he thinks Jay is in love with Lola, and he confesses this to Abi when she confronts him. He then ends things to stay in Walford. Devastated, she wants to leave for Bolton immediately, but when Max refuses to take her, she drives the car herself, accidentally running over Tramp, killing him; she callously declares that "things die". After her break up with Jay, Abi becomes a much nastier and bitter person. She begins a relationship with Ben (now played by Harry Reid), which is discovered by Emma Summerhayes (Anna Acton) who informs Max of the relationship. Max demands that Abi does not see Ben any more, which Abi refuses to do. After she moves in with him, Ben reveals to her that he might still be gay and is worried he will never get over his homosexuality, but Abi assures him that they will make things work.

Following Ben's arrest for Lucy Beale's (Hetti Bywater) murder, Abi tells Phil that Max assaulted Lucy to get Ben off. Despite being innocent, Max turns himself in and is formally charged while Ben is released. Stacey visits Max, who tells her that he thinks Abi killed Lucy. Stacey confronts Abi, who attacks Stacey, blaming her for her parents' split and Bradley's death. Ben and Abi continue their relationship, but Ben is secretly seeing Paul Coker (Jonny Labey). Babe Smith (Annette Badland) offers Abi work in the pub kitchen, and Abi tells Babe that she is able to turn a blind eye to Ben's homosexuality, as long as he loves her. However, when Abi finds a present that Ben has got for Paul, she realises he has feelings for Paul and confides in Babe, who helps her to publicly announce that she is pregnant. Ben asks Abi to have a termination but then changes his mind, saying he wants the baby. Abi then goes to Babe, panicking because she has lied and is not really pregnant. She decides to tell Ben the truth, but as she is about to do so, he tells her he has caught chlamydia. Abi later tests positive for chlamydia. Babe pushes Abi into Ben as he is pushed by Phil, knocking her to the ground. Babe takes Abi away from the square, and on their return, Abi tells Ben she has had a miscarriage. When she later sees Ben being comforted by Paul, she feels uneasy.

Abi and Babe discover that Ben's half-sister Louise Mitchell (Tilly Keeper) has been using Phil's credit card, so they force her to return everything she has bought. After a spat with Abi, Babe sends Ben a letter, telling him of the fake pregnancy. Louise finds the letter and blackmails Abi, telling her to move away with Ben. Abi tries to persuade Ben into moving but he refuses, saying he needs to be there for alcoholic Phil. Abi accidentally confesses, after which Ben gets drunk and kisses Abi in the pub toilets and starts to undress her, but then drags her into the pub in her underwear and reveals via the karaoke microphone that she made up her pregnancy. Babe emotionally blackmails Abi, forcing her to resign. Abi exposes Babe's secrets to the pub's landlord, Mick Carter (Danny Dyer), so he tells Abi that she can keep her job. Abi locks Babe in the kitchen freezer room as an act of revenge, although Babe frames her sister, Sylvie Carter (Linda Marlowe). Abi is then reinstated at the Vic by a seemingly apologetic Babe but her behaviour, when alone in the kitchen with Abi, is threatening. Babe later leaves Walford after being thrown out by her family, so Abi runs the kitchen alone.

Abi tells Lauren's boyfriend, Steven Beale (Aaron Sidwell), that they would make a good couple during a heart-to-heart. Abi and Steven fall out with Lauren at Abi's 21st birthday party and start an affair; Abi later learns that Steven is lying about having a brain tumour so that Lauren will not leave him. Despite being against the idea, Abi does not tell Lauren as Steven promises Abi he is planning to leave Lauren to be with her. Then Abi is stunned by Steven's public marriage proposal to Lauren. Jane overhears Abi and Steven talking about their relationship and confronts them. Abi then discovers she is pregnant by Steven. Abi helps Steven keep up the lie by giving him a brain scan from a dog and animal medication that will give him symptoms of an illness, as well as helping to keep Lauren away from doctor's appointments that Steven has invented. Abi discovers that Ian's restaurant is on fire and goes inside. She finds Jane on the floor struggling to breathe. A pipe falls onto Abi, knocking her unconscious, but Max and Steven soon find her and drag her out. She is taken to hospital with Lauren by her side in the ambulance. At the hospital, Abi tells Steven he is going to be a father. Steven declares his love for her and makes a promise that he will make their relationship work. Steven then dies from injuries inflicted by Max during the fire, leaving an unaware Abi devastated.

Out of jealousy that Lauren is getting all the attention, Abi tries to tell Lauren about her pregnancy, but Lauren angrily mistakes this as gloating about her own abortion. Upset at the accusation, Abi says that she wishes Lauren died instead and that she never deserved Steven. Steven's tumour lie is revealed, so Abi attends Steven's funeral as the sole mourner and declares her love. Abi is fired from her job at the vets when they have CCTV evidence of her stealing medication. She asks Mick to extend her working hours at the pub, but he makes her redundant as they need to save money. Lauren eventually learns the truth about Abi and Steven's affair when she catches Abi wearing her wedding dress. Lauren is disgusted to learn that Abi is pregnant with Steven's baby, but over time, Lauren becomes more supportive.

Abi goes away, and on her return, is confused when people are showing hatred towards Max, unaware that he was involved in a plan to redevelop Albert Square, including turning business into luxury flats and evicting people from their homes and places of work. Max reveals that he has been planning this as part of revenge against the community of Walford for being falsely imprisoned for Lucy’s murder and also turns on Abi by reminding her that she implicated him to the police for Lucy‘s murder. However, they later make amends. On Christmas Day, Tanya returns to take Lauren and Abi away from Walford, revealing that Max killed Steven and tried to kill Jane. Lauren and Abi reject Max. Max goes to the roof of the Queen Vic, planning to jump, so Lauren and Abi climb on to the ledge to try and stop him. As Max agrees to his daughter's pleas to not jump, Lauren slips on the wet surface and Abi grabs her hand to stop her falling; both sisters fall off to the ground. Still alive, they are taken to hospital, where an ultrasound shows Abi's baby is alive. Abi has a CT scan and Lauren has surgery. Lauren recovers but Dr. Harding (Nick Waring) tells Max that Abi is brainstem dead and has no chance of regaining consciousness. Abi's baby is delivered via cesarean section. Max is hopeful that Abi will recover and does not tell Lauren the truth, but she slaps Max when she finds out. Max obtains a court order to stop Abi's life support being withdrawn and plans to take her to the US for a treatment that will cost £2,000,000, but Harding urges Max to do the dignified thing for Abi as she is already dead and as Abi is not a minor, he has no legal right to take her. The family finally make the decision to switch off Abi's life support, and she dies with her parents and sister at her bedside. After her funeral, Max names her baby Abi Branning, in her memory and she is toasted in the Vic while her friends let off balloons.

== Reception ==
Fitzgerald was nominated for the "Best Young Actor" at the 2010 Inside Soap Awards for her portrayal of Abi though lost out to Coronation Street's, Alex Bain, who plays Simon Barlow. Fitzgerald won the award for "Best Dramatic Performance from a Young Actor or Actress" at the 2012 British Soap Awards 2012 an award which Tony Stewart from the Daily Mirror said was "well deserved". Fitzgerald said she did not expect to win the award. In January 2012, Kate White of Inside Soap praised both Fitzgerald and her character, saying "In Fitzgerald, EastEnders has the brightest young star in soap. The rest of her family are getting all the juicy stuff right now, but Abi's destined for great dramatic things. Mark our words". Her colleague, Steven Murphy, said Inside Soap had "long admired" Fitzgerald.

Stewart said, due to Max's past events with his family, what Abi might say when Max objects to her relationship with Jay, "It won't be her setting a gerbil on him", calling her a "goody-two-shoes". A writer from the Western Mail said that the Branning/Mitchell Feud makes Abi and Jay feel like "Walford's answer to Romeo and Juliet". Two writers from the Daily Mirror mocked the storyline where Abi turns down the trip to Costa Rica. One said, "An extreme case of soap agoraphobia as brilliant Abi sensibly turns down the chance to spend eight weeks in the tropical paradise of Costa Rica. But in the tiny micro-world of EastEnders, even the three-mile odyssey from Walford to the West End is considered an epic journey. So Central America is simply out of the question" with another saying, "Abi was a little girl arranging tearful funerals for her pets. But now she's a young teenager, secretly engaged to boyfriend Jay and planning to run away together. He then gives Abi an ultimatum: him or her trip to Costa Rica. Best pass her the suncream, then". However, Abi, along with the younger members of the cast were thought to be the blame of declining ratings for the show; "In the last two months, viewers have seen lots of Lauren, Lucy Beale (Hetti Bywater), Whitney Dean (Shona McGarty), Fatboy (Ricky Norwood), Ben Jay, Abi and Anthony Moon (Matt Lapinskas) – but not nearly so much of the classic characters". Inside Soap noted that Abi and Jay's relationship was popular with viewers.

The 2016 storyline in which Abi lies that she has suffered a miscarriage to cover up a pregnancy lie was criticised by Zoe Clark-Coates, co-founder and CEO of The Mariposa Trust, who said, "To regularly see TV shows using fake miscarriages as light entertainment could make people question genuine losses." In August 2017, Fitzgerald was longlisted for "Best Bad Girl" at the 2017 Inside Soap Awards, while she and Aaron Sidwell (Steven Beale) were longlisted for "Best Partnership". Fitzgerald made the viewer-voted shortlist in the "Best Bad Girl" category, but lost out to Gillian Kearney, who portrays Emma Barton in Emmerdale. The scene where Lauren and Abi fell from the roof of The Queen Vic was awarded "Scene of the Year" at the 2018 British Soap Awards, tying with Doctors who also won the same award for "The Bollywood Proposal". Abi's death was nominated for "Most devastating Soap Death" at the 2018 Digital Spy Reader Awards; it came in seventh place with 6.4% of the total votes.

== See also ==
- List of EastEnders characters (2006)
- List of soap opera villains
- "Who Killed Lucy Beale?"
