= Max Branning =

- EastEnders character
- Portrayed by: Jake Wood
- Duration: 2006–2021, 2025–present
- First appearance: Episode 3177; 27 June 2006
- Created by: Simon Ashdown
- Introduced by: Kate Harwood (2006); Ben Wadey (2025)
- Spin-off appearances: Last Tango in Walford (2010); The Queen Vic Quiz Night (2020)
In-universe information
- Occupation: Car salesman; Businessman; Acquisition agent
- Family: Branning
- Father: Jim Branning
- Mother: Reenie Branning
- Stepmother: Dot Cotton
- Brothers: Derek Branning; Jack Branning
- Sisters: April Branning; Carol Jackson; Suzy Branning
- Wife: Rachel Branning (backstory); Tanya Cross (1994–2010); Kirsty Branning (2011–2014); Rainie Cross (2018–2020); Cindy Beale (m. 2026)
- Sons: Bradley Branning; Oscar Branning
- Daughters: Lauren Branning; Abi Branning; Annie Carter
- Stepsons: Steven Beale; Peter Beale
- Stepdaughters: Gina Knight; Anna Knight; Cindy Williams
- Grandsons: Louie Beale; Jimmy Beale
- Granddaughters: AJ Branning
- Nephews: Robbie Jackson; Billie Jackson; Joey Branning; James Branning; Ricky Branning; Kevin
- Nieces: Bianca Jackson; Sonia Fowler; Alice Branning; Penny Branning; Amy Mitchell; Rebecca
- Other relatives: Liam Butcher; Tiffany Butcher; Morgan Butcher; Sami Jackson; Bex Fowler

Max Branning is a fictional character from the BBC soap opera EastEnders, portrayed by Jake Wood and first appeared on 27 June 2006. Wood departed the role in 2021 following 15 years, with his final scenes airing on 19 February. In July 2025, it was announced that Wood would reprise the role, with Max returning on 3 September. On 1 January 2026, Max was the focus of a flashforward episode to one year in the future, New Year’s Day 2027, with the events of 2026 set to focus on the Brannings' and Max's journey towards 2027.

Many of Max's storylines focus on his numerous relationships, including his marriages to Tanya (Jo Joyner) and Kirsty Branning (Kierston Wareing) alongside both Tanya's sister Rainie Cross (Tanya Franks) and fellow spouse Cindy Beale (Michelle Collins) respectively, and several romances that often end up becoming extramarital affairs; most notably with his daughter-in-law Stacey Slater (Lacey Turner) and later with their close acquaintance Linda Carter (Kellie Bright).

In 2008, Max was the subject of a whodunit storyline after being run over, with the culprit revealed to be his daughter Lauren. He later struggled with the death of his son Bradley Branning (Charlie Clements), established feuds with many people such as Phil Mitchell (Steve McFadden) and Ian Beale (Adam Woodyatt), became embroiled in many family problems, and was wrongfully convicted for the murder of Lauren's best-friend Lucy Beale (Hetti Bywater) murder in 2015; the true killer was later revealed to be Lucy's younger half-brother Bobby. Following his release from prison, Max orchestrated a revenge plot against those he blamed for his imprisonment alongside notorious villain James Wilmott-Brown (William Boyde) that culminated in the death of Ian's stepson Steven (Aaron Sidwell) and a rooftop confrontation at the Queen Victoria public house in which both his daughters fell and Lauren survived whereas her sister Abi (Lorna Fitzgerald) died.

In 2025, Max returned in flashback scenes involving Stacey's estranged cousin Zoe Slater (Michelle Ryan) before making his full return to Walford. His storylines since his return include discovering he had a daughter with Linda, trying to bond with his younger son Oscar (Pierre Counihan-Moullier), being accused of sleeping with Oscar's girlfriend Jasmine Fisher (Indeyarna Donaldson-Holness), clashing with Phil's brother Grant (Ross Kemp) and later with the latter's son Mark (Stephen Aaron-Sipple), and being engaged to Cindy before their wedding ended with Cindy discovering that Max cheated on her with their wedding planner Priya Nandra-Hart (Sophie Khan Levy).

== Creation and development ==
=== Casting ===
Jake Wood was cast in the role of Max in January 2006. At the time, little was known of the character, who was to move in with Jim (John Bardon) and Dot Branning (June Brown). Wood commented: "I'm a great admirer of both John Bardon and June Brown and I'm looking forward to joining the Branning family." In March 2008, Max was temporarily written out of the show when Wood went on paternity leave. Wood said of this "It comes at a good time because Max is getting grief over his affair so he will disappear for a while." He returned three months later, in June. In May 2009, Wood signed a new two-year contract with the show after which he took a temporary four-month break from the show in August 2011, which Wood said was down to the fact that after five years of playing Max, he was tired and "needed a break". Wood returned to filming after signing another two-year contract, and Max returned with his older brother Derek Branning (Jamie Foreman) in November.

=== Characterisation ===
Wood has described Max as "damaged", with a troubled upbringing, and uses this backstory to justify Max's actions in the series, saying that Max is motivated to be a better father to his children than his own father was to him, and that Max has done nothing that would be out of character.

=== Storyline development ===
In May 2009, Wood said he hoped his character would get back with his wife, Tanya (Jo Joyner), saying: "He believes Tanya still loves him. I think she does too." Later in 2009, Max gets into debt and tries to con various Walford residents. On conning single mother Heather Trott (Cheryl Fergison), Wood said "Max has got a conscience but he's thinking about his own survival. He wants to keep his family at all costs." On hiding Max's debt problems from Tanya, Wood commented: "Max thinks he can wriggle out of situations and admitting to debt would be a blow to his manhood. But Tanya would have understood and he'd have kept his family. [...] The problem between Max and Tanya has always been honesty. If Tanya finds out she may never trust Max again." When Tanya discovers Max's lies, she leaves him. This storyline facilitated Joyner's temporary departure on maternity leave. The show's executive producer Diederick Santer commented: "Yet again, Max has messed up, hasn't he? He's learned to keep it in his trousers, but financially, he's corrupt. He's taken his eye off the ball business-wise and like a lot of people in the last year or two, he's found it tough going. His inability to show weakness or to share his problems with Tanya has been his downfall. He has to rebuild his life now and his long-term objective is to get Tanya back. Jo Joyner is of course returning to the Square but whether Max gets Tanya back is another thing. I don't know if he's good enough for her." Santer also revealed that some planned storyline material for Max and Tanya was put on hold until Tanya's return from maternity leave.

In March 2010, a new love interest for Max was announced, Vanessa Gold, played by Zöe Lucker. A spokesperson for the show said that "[Max and Vanessa] are both volatile and explosive characters and their meeting will be like putting a lit match next to a barrel [of] gunpowder." Wood said that Max is weak when it comes to women, although his desire is to have his wife and children back, adding that "He always makes mistakes, he's easily led and the grass is always greener. He's his own worst enemy."

In March 2011, it was revealed that Max and Abi would suffer severe injuries after their car crashes into a lorry on the way to Tanya's wedding to Greg Jessop (Stefan Booth), prompting Tanya to flee the wedding to help him. The crash scenes were filmed on 6 March 2011.

=== Sabbatical ===
On 28 May 2015, it was announced that Wood had decided to take a year-long hiatus from EastEnders. Of this decision, Wood said, "I have been at EastEnders for nine years and I feel the time is right to give Max a break—but it won't be for too long as I shall be back next year to see Max face another chapter of drama." Executive producer Dominic Treadwell-Collins added: "When I returned to EastEnders, both Jake and I agreed that Max has been through so much over the past nine years that we would give him and Jake a break when the opportunity arose. That opportunity has come and it is the perfect time to send Max Branning out with a bang that will send ripples through the Square for the rest of the year until Jake returns."

Max left on 1 October 2015 after being wrongly convicted for Lucy Beale's (Hetti Bywater) murder (see "Who Killed Lucy Beale?"). He made a cameo appearance on 9 June 2016, making a quick return to the square to return Lauren and Abi's letter of apology then leaving again, indicating that he has not forgiven them for letting him go to jail when they knew he was innocent. Max's full return aired on 24 December 2016.

=== Departure (2021) ===
In September 2020, it was announced that Wood would be departing from the cast of EastEnders after fifteen years in the role, with Max being written out as part of an "explosive exit". His final scenes were broadcast on 19 February 2021.

=== Reintroduction (2025) ===
In July 2025, it was announced that Wood had reprised the role. Max will return for a short stint in the autumn before returning full-time later in the year. His return follows that of his daughter Lauren (Jacqueline Jossa) in January 2024 and his son Oscar (Pierre Counihan-Moullier) in July 2025.

== Storylines ==
=== 2006–2021 ===
Max Branning arrives in Walford in June 2006. He has come to visit his father Jim (John Bardon) after being estranged for 17 years, but this turns into a confrontation that ends with Jim throwing him out. Max then reunites with his son Bradley (Charlie Clements), and decides to stay to rebuild their relationship.

Eventually Max's wife Tanya (Jo Joyner) soon arrives to collect him. A month later the couple, along with their two daughters Lauren (Madeline Duggan) and Abi (Lorna Fitzgerald), move to Albert Square themselves. At first Tanya wanted to leave Max due to his extramarital affairs, with the latest being with a woman named Gemma Clewes (Natalie J. Robb), but she reluctantly decided to give their marriage one last try. As an apology and to show his commitment, Max buys 10 Turpin Road for Tanya to open as a beauty parlour.

As his family settle in the square, Max begind spending time with Bradley to repair their father-son relationship. He soon meets Bradley's girlfriend, Stacey Slater (Lacey Turner), and thinks he is too good for her. When Stacey later gets pregnant with his son's baby, Max gives Bradley money for an abortion and telling him a baby will ruin his life. However, the abortion ends the relationship Stacey decides to hurt Bradley by making a move on Max during Christmas 2006; Max and Stacey kiss and the two soon embark on a passionate affair that lasts for several months going into 2007. Max's affair with Stacey is briefly halted when Tanya tells Max she is pregnant and he tries to save his marriage, despite promising Stacey that he will leave Tanya. But when Stacey learns of Tanya's pregnancy, Max takes his family to Spain and a few weeks later, tells Bradley they are moving there permanently. Max returns with his family to find that Stacey and Bradley have reconciled and are now engaged. On the night of Bradley and Stacey's wedding, Max kisses Stacey and although she rejects him, Lauren's camcorder captures the kiss on video. Soon after, Tanya and Max's son, Oscar, is born. Max and Stacey's affair is revealed at Christmas after Lauren makes a copy of the recording and gives it to Bradley. Both couples separate and Bradley disowns his father while Tanya files for divorce, but Max interferes in Tanya's romance with Stacey's brother Sean Slater (Rob Kazinsky) and threatens to discredit her as an unfit mother. With Sean's help, Tanya drugs Max and puts him in a coffin before burying him alive in the woods, knowing that a similar thing happened to him when he was 13 years old. An attack of conscience prompts Tanya to dig Max up and he decides to leave Walford as he can see how much devastation he had caused.

In June 2008, Max reappears on the square and attempts to reconcile with Tanya only to discover she is now dating his younger brother Jack (Scott Maslen) ever since he left. Max tries to separate them by attempting to buy the house for himself, and then planning to frame Jack for a crime he did not commit. He also considered asking local hardman Phil Mitchell (Steve McFadden) for help in getting rid of Jack, which briefly led to a confrontation with Phil's old enemy Ian Beale (Adam Woodyatt) over his suspicions that the pair had a gun, and at one point tried seducing Phil's cousin Ronnie (Samantha Womack) after she broke up with Jack not long afterwards. When Jack finds out Max is plotting against him, he abducts his brother and warns him to stay away. Shortly afterwards, Max clashes with Bradley and kisses Tanya before she throws him out. Later that evening, he is the victim of a hit-and-run he is hospitalized with a broken leg and has to have a splenectomy. Tanya claims to be the culprit and is arrested, but then Max discovers the assailant was actually Lauren when she confesses to driving the car; Lauren eventually turns herself into the police and is placed in care while Tanya is released. At her trial, Lauren is found not guilty of attempted murder but guilty of grievous bodily harm and decides to go home. Max and Tanya start a secret relationship and Tanya later allows Max to move back in.

In 2009, Max gets into financial trouble and is left with a huge debt. He soon begins conning people with false insurance claims, including both Phil and Ian along with fellow neighbours Heather Trott (Cheryl Fergison) and Masood Ahmed (Nitin Ganatra) respectively. However, Max is found out and debt collectors arrive and take his assets. Once the extent of both Max's debts and scams along with his other lies become clear, Tanya leaves with Lauren and Oscar but Abi stays. Max sinks into depression and sends Abi to live with her mother. Max and Bradley decide to go into business together and Ronnie's sister Roxy (Rita Simons) rents the car lot to them. Following the murder of Phil's uncle Archie (Larry Lamb) on Christmas Day 2009, Max discovers that Bradley punched Archie because he raped Stacey and also thought that Archie also the father of her baby. When the police come for Bradley two months later, Max helps him and Stacey flee but the police chase him to a rooftop where he stumbles and falls to his death. As Max and Stacey cry, she admits that she killed Archie. Stacey goes missing but Max finds her, and after an emotional confrontation, he takes her home and they agree not to tell anyone about Archie's murder.

However, Lauren (now played by Jacqueline Jossa) soon begins to suspect that Max killed Archie after noticing her father display some unusual behaviour. Max tells her that he made a promise to the killer to protect them. After Stacey tells Lauren that Max is looking after her, Lauren tells Max that she has worked out that Stacey is the killer. Lauren gets a confession from Stacey and tells her sworn enemy Janine Butcher (Charlie Brooks) about the secret; Janine publicly announces that Stacey is a killer, so Max helps her to escape. He drives her to the airport and says he does still love her but she says she only loves Bradley and then leaves the country

When Max's marriage with Tanya seems to be over beyond repair, he starts dating Vanessa Gold (Zöe Lucker); they first met after she buys a car from him. But their romance doesn't last when Max it becomes clear that Max is still in love with Tanya, which prompts Vanessa to dump him. When Tanya sends Max their finalised divorced papers, he storms in to her house and tells her he still loves her. However, Tanya says she has moved on and reveals she is due to marry her new boyfriend Greg Jessop (Stefan Booth) in a few months after the pair ended up getting engaged. Max attempts to reconcile with Vanessa, but she informs him that their relationship will never be serious. However, when Vanessa's husband Harry (Linal Haft) finds out about their, he throws her out and she moves in with Max. As such Vanessa's daughter, Jodie Gold (Kylie Babbington), also moves in with Lauren and Abi. When Harry finds out, he takes revenge by throwing a brick through their window, destroying Vanessa's clothes and killing Jodie's cat. Max and Jack threaten Harry, thinking it is over but Jack is kidnapped by orders from Harry, and Max finds him the next day in the boot of his car.

Soon enough Max proposes to Vanessa, and she accepts. They announce their engagement to everyone, but Tanya confronts Max and tells him that she knows that he only proposed to Vanessa to make her jealous. Max and Tanya argue before sleeping together, and they begin cheating on their respective partners with each other, but Lauren discovers this so Tanya decides to end it. However, despite Tanya marrying Greg, she continues seeing Max and their secret continues until the truth is discovered when he leaves Vanessa. In the aftermath of their respective break-ups, Max goes to Tanya in hope he will be with her. Unknown to him, she has found out she may have cancer and tells him she does not love him. Kicked out by his children, Max decides to leave. Meanwhile, Tanya chases after Max but is too late, and watches as a tearful Max leaves Walford in his car.

With Max away from the square, his family begins to fall apart; Jack later informs Tanya that Max is staying with their older brother Derek (Jamie Foreman), and decides to bring him back in order to sort out their family problems. Max visits Tanya but ends up insulting her and she throws him out. As Max is about to leave, Lauren stops him, telling him that Tanya has cervical cancer and they need his help. Max talks to Tanya, and she explains her fears about her condition and reveals that she helped her sick father to die. Max then vows to support Tanya and stays with her along with Derek, although Tanya later throws Derek out. The family manage to enjoy Christmas together as they realise it might be Tanya's last one. When Tanya overhears Derek taunting Janine's stepmother Pat Evans (Pam St Clement) over their past, she furiously brands him a "freak" and Derek is livid when Max sides with her. Max is unnerved, however, when Derek hints that he knows things about Max that he does not want Tanya to know. Max becomes sexually frustrated as Tanya is never in the mood for sex due to her treatment, and nearly sleeps with Roxy after he sees her naked. They kiss in an alleyway but are interrupted when a shout comes for Roxy. The next day, they text and call each other. Tanya then lies to Max that her nurse has recommended she does not have any sex. They are later shocked to discover Lauren has drunk so much she was passed out in the street. Lauren claims her drink was spiked, then says she is old enough to do what she likes after she is grounded. She then decides to move out. Max later has a change of heart and texts Roxy, telling her that nothing more can happen between them. Max is relieved when Tanya is given the all-clear from cancer. Tanya is unconvinced, however, and remains distant while her mother Cora (Ann Mitchell) begins to suspect Max is sleeping with Roxy in the fallout. Max gets Roxy to admit to Cora that she attempted to seduce him, but that he refused her. However, after a frank discussion with Tanya over their marriage and above all sex life Max reassures Tanya that she is all that matters to him and that he will not be straying again.

When Tanya discovers that cars at the car lot are being repossessed, she and Max argue, which leads to passion and they have sex for the first time since Tanya's all-clear from cancer. Derek continues to allude to something Max did when he was staying with him. On Oscar's first day at school, Max claims he cannot attend as he is stuck in traffic, but he is instead seen posting an envelope full of money through somebody's letterbox. Max and Tanya plan to remarry, and Derek continues to remind Max that "they" want more money. Max gives Derek cash, but does not know that Derek does not pass it on. The day before the wedding, a drunken Lauren angrily tears up Tanya's wedding dress and destroys the cake, then reveals that she was drunk driving when she crashed Derek's car and her cousin Joey Branning (David Witts) took the blame, manipulated by his father, Derek. She also reveals that she has been having a relationship with Joey. Max and Tanya cancel the wedding, and Max tells Derek that he wants nothing more to do with him after Christmas. Derek takes revenge by contacting the person involved in Max's secret, giving them Max's address. Max surprises Tanya with another wedding dress on Christmas Day, saying they can marry, but a woman claiming to be Max's wife, Kirsty Branning (Kierston Wareing), arrives. Max confirms to an angry Tanya that he did marry Kirsty in 2011, but Derek had told him they were divorced. Kirsty reveals that she was pregnant by Max, but after Max left her to reunite with Tanya, Derek said that Max did not want the child, so she had an abortion. Max did not know about the pregnancy. Max confronts Derek and threatens to kill him for his lies and manipulation and Derek reveals that he always hated Max for being the "runt of the litter" in a heated argument. Derek is forced out by his own son and brothers, but then collapses and dies of a heart attack in front of them.

At first Max has mixed-emotions over Derek's death, finding it difficult to grieve for his brother. Despite rifts between him and Tanya following Kirsty's reveal, they depart on holiday during the new year after Derek's funeral. On their return, things are relatively healed between them. However, Max passionately embraces Kirsty after a heated argument. He then believes she has left Walford until she arrives at Derek's funeral. When Lauren befriends Kirsty, Kirsty gives Lauren a set of keys, which Max finds in her pocket. Tanya later discovers them and assumes that Max and Kirsty are still involved. However, Kirsty eventually agrees to sign the divorce papers and gives them to Max. Max shows Tanya and says Kirsty is leaving, but she realises Max still loves Kirsty believed because he refuses to have sex with her and is sad about Kirsty leaving. Max confirms this, so Tanya ejects Max from the house saying their relationship is over for good, as Kirsty leaves Walford. When Kirsty posts her wedding ring to Max, he tracks her down and finds her being abused by her ex-boyfriend's brother, who beats Max up. Max and Kirsty return to Walford and live together at the B&B. Kirsty lies to Max that she is pregnant in an attempt to stop him returning to Tanya. Max encourages Kirsty to abort the pregnancy, but following another refusal by Tanya to rekindle their relationship, he changes his mind and moves into a new flat with Kirsty. Max and Kirsty's relationship comes under pressure due to the meddling of her ex-fiancé, Carl White (Daniel Coonan), before he and Tanya argue because of her refusal to take him back, as well as Lauren's alcoholism. When Lauren tells Max and Tanya she cannot stand their constant arguing, Tanya agrees and decides to take Lauren out of Walford for treatment. Max later finds out about Kirsty's fake pregnancy after finding a pregnancy test on the floor that she threw in the bin. He ends the relationship with Kirsty and tries to convince Tanya to reunite, but she leaves Walford for Lauren's sake, after telling a heartbroken Max she will always love him.

Struggling with losing Tanya, Max rebukes Kirsty's pleas for a reconciliation and struggles to look after Abi. Eventually, with Abi's blessing, they reunite, and Kirsty moves into their house. Lauren returns, having left her rehabilitation clinic early, worrying Max. Max's feud with Carl continues, and, determined to get rid of Max so he can win back Kirsty, he purposefully cuts the brakes on his car, and crashes it, leaving Phil in a critical condition. He frames Max for cutting the brakes, and forces Ian to become a false witness. Max is arrested and released on bail, until Carl goads him into attacking him, and he is remanded in custody. He then ends his relationship with Kirsty under Carl's instructions, partially because Carl has also threatened Lauren's safety as well. Carl also forces Max to tell his family he is guilty, and Lauren is the only person who believes he is innocent. On the day of Max's trial, Ian fails to turn up, and Max is released without charge, to Carl's fury. Max then heads to a wasteland with Phil, and it is revealed they have kidnapped Ian. They use Ian as bait to trap Carl, and then let him go, and Phil offers Max the chance to kill Carl. Max declines and returns to his family instead, resuming his relationship with Kirsty. however, Carl soon tells Max that he had sex with Kirsty while he was in prison, leading to Max ending his relationship with her. Several months later, Kirsty leaves Walford for good.

It is then Max discovers that Stacey is back when her cousin, Kat (Jessie Wallace), spots her from a bus in London. He helps track Stacey down, but decides he cannot be involved when he realises he may still have feelings for her. Stacey later turns to Max for help, but they end up in a passionate kiss, and Stacey later leaves Walford with her daughter Lily (Aine Garvey) to stay with her mother Jean (Gillian Wright) in Brighton. Max later starts a sexual tryst with his daughter Lauren's best friend and Ian's daughter, Lucy Beale (Hetti Bywater), which they manage to keep a secret for several weeks. Somebody eventually finds out about Max and Lucy's tryst, and e-mails him an image of the pair kissing. Max confronts Lucy, believing it is her trying to blackmail him, but it is revealed it is not. Eventually, Lucy ends her tryst with Max due to her new relationship with Lee Carter (Danny Hatchard), which infuriates Max. A physical struggle ensues, which ends when Lucy falls over and hits her head on a chair. Max and Lucy have an explosive argument outside of the car lot, which sees Max grab Lucy violently by her arm. Later that night, Lucy is murdered by an unknown assailant (see Who Killed Lucy Beale?). Max becomes prime suspect after the police discover that Lucy was having an affair, and Max reveals all to Lucy's uncle David Wicks (Michael French) when confronted over the matter. David initially tries to encourage Max to confess to the Beales and the police, but he refuses, and David threatens to tell the police everything. After Max's sister and David's partner Carol Jackson (Lindsey Coulson) collapses and is rushed to hospital due to her suffering from breast cancer, David realises he must protect Max for her so gets rid of all of the evidence of Max and Lucy's fallout.

Remembering the moving eulogy Max made at Bradley's funeral, Ian turns to him for advice over Lucy's impending funeral. Abi becomes irate when she sees Max supporting Ian and reveals that she knows that he was sleeping with Lucy and was the person that sent him the email of him and Lucy together. Abi's boyfriend Jay Brown (Jamie Borthwick) witnesses the confrontation between them and tells Phil, who in turn reveals the truth to a horrified Ian. At the funeral, Ian attacks Max when he sees him carrying Lucy's coffin and later Phil summons Kat's husband Alfie Moon (Shane Richie) to visit Max; they tell him that he is no longer welcome in the square. Max then begins a sexual relationship with DC Emma Summerhayes (Anna Acton), the detective who is investigating Lucy's murder. Emma ends things when Dot's grandson Charlie (Declan Bennett) discovers their relationship and threatens to report it. When Stacey is released after an appeal, Max employs her at the car lot, but she decides to leave when he admits he still has feelings for her and it was those feelings that drove him to have the affair with Lucy. Stacey then encourages him to get back in touch with Emma, and she and Max resume their relationship. He impresses Emma's parents when they visit but when Emma wants to end their relationship because of the pressures of the case, Max makes an anonymous call to the police which starts an investigation into Emma's misconduct. Max is angry when Emma gives Lauren's laptop to the police, and as a result, Abi's behaviour regarding Max and Lucy is revealed to both the police and Lauren. After Emma is hit by a car in the Square, Max takes her to hospital where she dies from a bleed to the brain. Max finds Emma's case notes in his kitchen cupboard and rips them up in front of Carol, and then turns to alcohol to deal with his grief. Thinking Phil was responsible for the crash, Max takes revenge by tricking his son Ben (Harry Reid) into signing over The Arches to him. When Max discovers Phil has been framed, he refuses to sign the business back to Phil despite Ben later telling him that Charlie's late father Nick (John Altman) was responsible for the crash. After he is banned from Emma's funeral, Max visits Phil in prison to tell him he has taken over ownership of The Arches. Phil swears revenge on Max, and after being released, manages to regain ownership of the garage and also takes the car lot from Max himself.

Having lost his businesses to Phil in the latest events of their feud, Max struggles and stops taking care of himself or paying his bills. Carol discovers this and invites Max to move in with her and rent out his house to pay the mortgage. Desperate for work, Max takes a job at Ian's fish and chip shop. When Ben is arrested for Lucy's murder, Phil manipulates Abi into coming forward about Max's fake alibi to the police. Max is arrested and is charged with her murder when Lucy's blood is found on his shoe, from where Jake Stone caused Lucy's nose to bleed on the night she died. After getting beat up in prison, Max summons Stacey to tell her that he believes Abi killed Lucy and later hires Phil's former lawyer Marcus Christie (Stephen Churchett) as his solicitor. Despite Ian's wife Jane (Laurie Brett) giving him a false alibi, he is found guilty thanks to Phil paying off the jury foreman. Upon hearing the verdict, Max escapes from court and manages to confront Jane in the hope of uncovering the truth. Jane simply says she believes Max is innocent and decides to help him escape to Ireland. Max wants to say a final goodbye to Lauren and Abi, so Jane goes to Carol's to find them. Carol realises Max is at Jane's so goes there and decides to go to Ireland with him. When Abi finds out Max is at Jane's house, she calls the police. Max soon realises that Jane's adopted son Bobby Beale (Eliot Carrington) is Lucy's killer all along and that Jane had been covering up for her. He then discovers that Lauren knew the truth and disowns her as the police arrive to arrest him once more. As he is being arrested, Max shouts out to everyone that Bobby killed Lucy but they all dismiss his claims as an act of desperation; Max is later sentenced to life imprisonment with a recommendation he should serve at least 21 years.

Seven months later, the truth about Bobby emerges and he is charged with Lucy's murder. Lauren and Abi attempt to visit Max in prison, but they find out that he has refused to see either of them. Max has a court hearing for his release, which Abi is reluctant to attend so Lauren writes Max a letter for Stacey to pass on, but Stacey misses Max at the court and hands it to his solicitor. Lauren and Abi wait for Max in The Queen Vic but he does not arrive, and when Lauren goes home, Max posts the letter back through the letterbox and quickly leaves in a taxi with Lauren failing to stop him. A week later, Max sends Ian a threatening note, saying he will never forget what he did. Max returns to Walford on Christmas Eve and claims that he has changed, giving up smoking and drinking, but in reality, he has become a dark man. He shakes hands with Ian and Jane, saying he wants to move on from the past. Lauren is glad to see Max but Abi is not as she is still angry with the way Max treated her during his trial. However, Max begs her to give him a chance and invites Abi, Lauren and Jack to have a drink with him. Abi accepts Max but Jack questions his motives. Stacey finds out that Phil bribed the foreman at Max's trial so that he could be found guilty, so tells Max. Max visits Phil at the hospital, but instead of suffocating Phil as Phil asks him to, Max states that he forgives him. Outside, Max burns his wrist with a cigarette, revealing that he has been self-harming himself. On New Year's Day 2017, Max attends Jack's wedding to Ronnie and is unaware that Roxy has slipped her bedroom key into his pocket. After the ceremony, Max goes to Roxy's bedroom and waits for her. There, he finds cocaine in Roxy's handbag. The next day, Max hears that Ronnie and Roxy have drowned and disposes of Roxy's cocaine so the police will not find it. Max supports Jack and his mother-in-law Glenda Mitchell (Glynis Barber) as they struggle to cope with their loss and to look after his children, Amy (Abbie Knowles) and Ricky (Henri Charles), along with his stepson Matthew - fathered by Ronnie and Charlie themselves. Max later plants the cocaine in a property owned by Phil's former foe Vincent Hubbard (Richard Blackwood), who is soon arrested for the crime.

When a bus crashes into the market, Max organises the rescue of Stacey's husband, Martin Fowler (James Bye), from under the bus and is hailed a hero. Later on that night, Max meets Hugo Browning (Simon Williams), the chairman of a company called Weyland & Co, and they share a cryptic conversation in which Hugo talks about the development of Walford, to which Max says that the pub is next on his list. It is soon revealed that Max works for Weyland & Co, and they are planning to redevelop the Albert Square area. Lauren meets Max's superior, Josh Hemmings (Eddie Eyre), and they are attracted to each other, so she decides to apply for a job at Weyland & Co, despite Max telling her not to. Max tells Josh not to employ her but Josh does so anyway. Max convinces Lee's grandmother Shirley (Linda Henry) to sell the freehold of The Queen Vic to a company called Grafton Hill.

A few weeks later, Max contacts Charlie and the latter returns to Walford to tellJack they need to talk about Matthew. Charlie insists he will seek custody of Matthew and starts a fight with Jack in public; Jack punches Charlie in the end. Max later visits Charlie when discovering the incident likely will not influence the legal case over Matthew, revealing their secret scheming, and says they have to take further actions; soon after, the police find Jack and arrest him for assault as Max watches. Jack is accused of badly hurting Charlie, who allowed Max to purposely attack and injure him to frame Jack for serious assault. The charges against Jack are dropped, and Charlie attempts to settle for residence of Matthew and plans to move to Ireland with him. Jack voluntarily gives Charlie residence of Matthew, but Max warns Charlie that he is not doing enough. Max gives him cash as a reward for his assistance and takes his mobile phone, telling him not to contact Jack again, threatening him with violence if he refuses. Charlie agrees and he leaves while his phone is smashed by Max himself.

Over the next few months, Max appears to take a romantic interest in next-door resident Carmel Kazemi (Bonnie Langford) and her job in working at Walford Council's planning department. On their first date, he uses the opportunity to secretly look at her files from the council. When Ian and Jane plan to sell the fish and chip shop, they are shocked to discover the buyer is Weyland & Co. Ian pulls out of the deal, fearing Max's motives. However, Max convinces Ian that he does not have any ulterior motives and he just wants to move on. Max and Carmel have sex after their second date but he leaves before she wakes up and goes home, where his house appears to show him to be wealthy despite telling people that he lives in a bedsit. It soon turns out that Max is secretly in a romantic partnership with his colleague Fi Browning (Lisa Faulkner), who works for Grafton Hill. Fi knows Max is seducing Carmel as part of their plan to get information from the council.

During this time, Max hears that Lauren is dating Ian's stepson Steven Beale (Aaron Sidwell) and that the pair are engaged despite Steven lying to Lauren that he has a brain tumour. Lauren leaves a message on Max's voicemail, requesting him to refuse Steven when he asks him for permission to marry her. However, Max deliberately gives his permission, pretending he did not get Lauren's message. Max then reveals to Steven that he knows about his brain tumour lie and stops Steven confessing to Lauren by telling her that Steven has three months to live. Max soon begins blackmailing Steven, threatening that he will reveal his lie if he does not do what he tells him. When a group of tenants refuse to leave their flat, Max orders Steven to burn it down but make sure the tenants are out. When Steven does this, he tells Max that he does not know if the tenants got out. Jane finds out about Steven's lie and Steven tells Max that he will tell her that Max lied for him. Max grabs Steven by the throat and threatens to kill him if he does that. Jane overhears Max and Fi talking about the redevelopment plan, which Max is using as revenge against those who wronged him in the past. Jane confronts Max in Ian's restaurant and at the same time, a gas explosion occurs on the Square so Max leaves Jane alone at the restaurant. Max confronts Steven at The Vic and orders him to kill Jane so she does not tell anyone. Steven sets fire to the restaurant with Jane inside and leaves her there, telling her this would not have happened if she had not let Max go to prison. Max and Steven go back to the restaurant and Max orders Steven to kill her. Steven refuses to allow her to die so Max angrily shoves him and forces him to leave. Max confronts Jane and tells her that while he was in prison, all he could think about was revenge on everyone who turned their back on him. He opens a hatch to allow the fire to spread to Jane and leaves, lying that he could not find Jane. Steven later dies from his injuries but Jane is rescued. Max goes to the hospital to see Jane, pretending to be her husband. He calls Jane's mobile and finds it in a drawer, then takes the SIM card out and bins it. Unable to speak, Jane tries to communicate with Sharon through writing but falls unconscious. Max tries to kill Jane by holding down on her breathing tube, but stops short when Ian walks in and thanks Max for 'saving' Jane from the fire.

Following Steven's death, it is revealed that Weyland & Co is owned by James Willmott-Brown (William Boyde) and that he is Max's true boss. Furthermore, both Josh and Fi are revealed to be James' children and that their half-sibling Luke (Adam Astill) is also Max's former prison cellmate. When Jane awakens from her coma, Max orders her to leave Walford. As Jane and Ian make plans, however, James tells Max that Ian must remain in Walford, so Max threatens Bobby's safety to make Jane leaves alone. James tells Max that he wants access to some sealed bids belonging to the council. Carmel offers to help him but he changes his mind. However, Fi meets him at Carmel's house, where they have sex. Unbeknownst to Max, Fi then hacks into Carmel's computer and accesses the sealed bids; Carmel is suspended from her job, though is later cleared. Mick and Linda are asked to pay £60,000 for development funds to The Queen Vic, but Max suggests that Fi reduce it to £50,000 to regain the Carters' trust and this works as the family raise the money. Lauren discovers a scale model of Albert Square showing its development, and confronts Max, who assures her that the developers have pulled out. Max buys an engagement ring for Fi, which Carmel finds and assumes that Max is going to propose to her, so she gathers her friends and family in The Queen Vic. However, Max kisses Fi in front of everyone and Camrel leaves in tears. James and Luke then enter The Queen Vic and reveal that the Carters didn't raise the money for Grafton Hill which is owned by Weyland, meaning that they now own the Vic, with Fi denying that she offered any discount. They also reveal Max's involvement in not only this but the whole of the development scam. Everyone is shocked by Max's actions who is smugly delighted that everything has fallen into place for him. Looking for the icing on the cake, Max proposes to Fi but is stunned when she refuses, much to the amusement of everyone in the pub. Max is further horrified when James and Luke betray him by burning his contract, revealing that he was being tricked all along. Speechless, Max sits defeated and alone in the Vic until Jack decides to take him home, fearing for Max's safety since his betrayal is now known to most of the square. Carmel's son, Kush (Davood Ghadami), arrives and punches Max for his treatment of Carmel.

Homeless and unemployed, Max is taken in by Jack after the latter discovers his self-harming. The next day, Max is given his desk belongings by Luke from Weyland and Co and after seeing Willmott-Brown and Fi in a car, he hysterically shouts at them for their betrayal. He then aggressively shouts at Jack until he is slapped by him. Josh gives Lauren the office copy of Max's contract, stating that he is entitled to the money and Weyland always set out to destroy him. He then lets Lauren decide what to do with the contract. Lauren demands the truth from Max, who says he did what he did to get money for his family. Lauren doesn't believe him and reveals the contract and threatens to burn it if he does not tell the truth; however, Max grabs it and destroys it himself, revealing that he doesn't care about the money and that all he wanted was revenge for everyone who lied or did nothing when he was sent to prison, including his own family. Max rages at Abi, Lauren and Jack who all leave, and he then smashes Jack's family photos. He goes to burn himself, but has no cigarettes left so headbutts a mirror instead. Jack, regretting his decision to abandon Max during his trial, supports him despite Max's rant. He arranges for Oscar to visit Max on his birthday, which delights Max and he convinces Abi to help him bake a cake. But Cora arrives and says she has heard what he did and told Tanya, who has decided to make sure Max never sees Oscar again. Jack continues to support Max and after persuading Mick and Linda to let Max drink the Vic, the two have a day in the pub. Max thanks Jack for his recent help. However, Charlie returns to Walford with Matthew and tells Jack that Max caused his injuries and paid him to take Matthew away. Max pleads with Jack to forgive him but Jack disowns Max. He throws him out onto the street before both Lauren and Abi give their father the brush off.

Close to a mental breakdown over his recent losses, Max decides to get revenge on Ian and Phil themselves. He surprises Ian in his house, stating that he is going to kill him. Ian says that Phil is the real culprit as he bribed the jury, but Max says that Phil is next on his list. Ian tries to escape Max by hitting him over the head with a frying pan, but Max pulls him back inside the house and starts to strangle him, just as Lauren walks in. Lauren stops Max from killing Ian, who tells Phil about it. Stacey hears from Lauren that Max has tried to kill Ian and calms him down, letting him stay with her and Martin. The next morning, Martin is unconvinced that Max will not come between Stacey and their family; he asks Stacey to tell Max to leave and she does. At this point, Max has continued to target Phil and is suspicious when he spots him hanging out with new resident Keanu Taylor (Danny Walters) alongside both Mick and Vincent respectively. He then catches the group leaving The Albert with Phil's partner-in-crime, Aidan Maguire (Patrick Bergin) and realises they are planning something. Max fails to try and manipulate Keanu into thinking that he will be used as collateral damage. Later on Christmas Eve, Max asks his daughters to forgive and see him on Christmas Day; both agree to think about it. Max then tricks Stacey into returning to her house and tries to convince her there is still a spark between them. Stacey initially resists but gives in and they have sex.

On Christmas Day, Max and Stacey both agree to keep quiet about the night before and Max is thrilled when Abi joins him for Christmas dinner, where he feels his grandchild kick for the first time. However, Stacey's phone is posted through the letter box and Max panics when he realises that Jane has left messages for Stacey about what Max did to her and Steven. After seducing Stacey again, he manages to delete them. To his horror, Tanya returns and reveals to Stacey that Max killed Steven and tried to kill Jane, having heard from Jane what Max did. Max desperately tries to deny it but its clear to Stacey that he's lying, and Tanya then tells him that she's taking their daughters away for their own safety. Under pressure from Stacey, Max finally confesses but tells her that he had good reasons. Stacey rejects him, saying he will never change and that she wishes he had died instead of Bradley. Ian attacks Max for what he did to Steven but is quickly over-powered and Max proceeds to punch him, before their fight is stopped by Lauren. Phil then confronts and beats up Max before brandishing a gun on him, but stops short of killing him when the latter tempts him into firing the gun. Max, having lost everything, goes to the roof of the Vic to jump but is seen by Tanya, Abi and Lauren who were about to leave. Despite Tanya's concerns and objections, Abi and Lauren go to the roof to try to talk him down. Max shouts at them to leave but after they both say they love him, he agrees to come down. Before they can get down, however, Lauren slips on the wet ledge and falls, taking Abi with her.

They survive the fall but are taken to hospital in a critical condition. Max tells a police officer that it is his fault, so he is arrested on suspicion of GBH. However, they receive a video filmed by Keanu's half-brother Keegan Baker (Zack Morris), showing Lauren and Abi falling, so he is released. He goes to the hospital where Tanya initially accepts his comfort but pushes him away when a nurse arrives with news about one of their daughters. The nurse informs them that while Lauren is expected to recover, Abi is brainstem dead and has no chance of regaining consciousness. Abi's baby is delivered via cesarean section. Max is hopeful that Abi will recover and does not tell Lauren the truth, but she slaps Max when she finds out. After this, Max obtains a court order to stop Abi's life support being withdrawn and plans to take her to the US for a treatment that will cost £2,000,000, but Dr Harding urges Max to do the dignified thing for Abi as she is already dead and as Abi is not a minor, he has no legal right to take her. Max barricades himself in Abi's hospital room, but is talked into letting the hospital staff in when a nurse tells Max about her own son's death and that she never got to say goodbye. When Dr Harding explains what will happen to Max and Lauren, Max asks if the life support can be withdrawn at Abi's time of birth, 8.32pm. Tanya, Cora and Rainie return but Cora tells Max that Tanya does not want him present when the life support is withdrawn. Max finds Tanya in the hospital's chapel and she is angry with Max that Abi has to die because of him. However, just before Abi's life support is withdrawn, Tanya requests Max to be there. Abi then dies, leaving her family devastated. Max is hurt when he is led to believe that Abi's funeral has taken place, but he discovers it has not and Lauren tells him that none of the family want him present. On the day of the funeral, Max respects Lauren's wishes to not attend the funeral and visits Abi's daughter during the funeral to register her birth, but at the end of Abi's funeral, Jay allows Max to say his goodbyes and Max delivers his eulogy, prompting Max and Lauren to make amends. Abi is toasted in the Vic, her friends let off white balloons and her daughter is named Abi as Max is determined to do things right.

Two months later, Max resurfaces after buying the car lot and becomes intent with gaining custody of Abi's daughter. He also marries Tanya's sister Rainie Cross (Tanya Franks) in order to look like a family man, shocking everyone when she is revealed as his wife. The marriage is a scam and it's revealed he's going pay Rainie when he gains the custody. Phil is unhappy when he discovers Max is back and has one of his former businesses. Their feud resumes when Phil attempts to con Max, who fends him off whilst mocking him. Despite a less than easy start, Max settles back into life on the square. Him and Rainie successfully fool their neighbours and social services whilst moving in with Jack. Rainie worries that Jack's girlfriend, Mel Owen (Tamzin Outhwaite), suspects their relationship is fake so they put on a convincing romance, including them passionately kissing. When Max realises that Rainie's kiss was real, he is shocked but she quickly admits it was a mistake. It is then Abi's old friend Donna Yates (Lisa Hammond) tries to stop Rainie and Max getting custody of the baby, but Rainie admits to Donna that she wants to bring up the baby because she cannot have children of her own due to her former drug use. Cora also returns and offers Rainie a job in Exeter and a chance to bring up Abi with her and Tanya, but Rainie reveals Cora's £50,000 bribe to social services. Rainie searches for houses so she and Max can bring up Abi on their own, and Max thanks her, asking what she will do once she receives her pay-off. This leaves Rainie upset as she secretly wants to stay with Max and Abi. Feeling lonely, she has a one-night stand with Jack but they both agree to never talk about it again the next day, not realising that Jack's daughter Amy had seen them kissing and taken a video. When Rainie decides to leave, Max realises his own feelings for her and stops her at the train station where they agree to enter a real relationship.

Just as the Brannings seem to be back on track, Cora discovers from Amy that Rainie slept with Jack and she smugly informs Max. Devastated, Max punches Jack in the cafe and confronts Rainie, who admits to it but tells him that it happened when her and Max weren't properly together. Max decides to forgive them both for the sake of baby Abi and they agree to deny it since Cora doesn't have any proper evidence. However, in the pub, Cora repeatedly insults Rainie to the point where Rainie slaps her, before Cora punches her back. Whilst outside, Max scolds Rainie for her actions and tells her she may well have ruined his case for Abi. Meanwhile, Jack tends to Cora who tells him that contrary to his, Max and Rainie's beliefs, she does have evidence of the one-night stand because Amy took a video. Jack tells Max and Rainie about this and Rainie decides to confront her mother. She enters the Beale's house from the backdoor and Cora mistakes this as her attempting to kidnap baby Abi. Max finds out where Rainie is and finds both her and Cora arguing. When Cora hits Rainie over the back of the head with a frying pan, Max flees with Abi back to his house where he's joined by Stacy. Social services are called and they arrive to take baby Abi from Max, leaving him heartbroken. The next day, however, Rainie blackmails Cora into dropping her application for Abi after threatening to tell the police that she attacked her. Max receives a call from social services and after persuading Ian and Jack to be present at a meeting, he is given baby Abi to care for. Max is delighted and he later reconciles with Rainie.

A year later when Bobby is released, Max is horrified and began a conflict with his family as he can never forgive him for what he has done including his ruined relationship with Lauren and Abi. Max attacks Bobby but is stopped by Ben (now played by Max Bowden). However, Max decides to forgive Bobby, who he helps with hallucinations of Lucy and organises a party to celebrate Bobby's conversion to Islam. Max becomes close to Stacey's old friend Ruby Allen (Louisa Lytton) and after sleeping together, they begin dating. Stacey becomes jealous and warns Max not to hurt Ruby. However, Max cannot cope with Ruby's free spirited character, which leads to him neglecting Abi who almost swallows a medicinal pill. Max decides to end the relationship but they reconcile. Max discovers that Ruby slept with Martin and suggests that they have an open relationship that Max struggles to accommodate. Whilst on a boat party, Max learns that Jack has been supporting Lauren with her separation from Peter which leads to Jack punching Max. Max grows jealous when he sees Martin and Ruby growing closer. When he tells Ruby that can't handle seeing her with Martin, Ruby dumps him. After learning that Ian Beale (Adam Woodyatt) has bought The Queen Victoria with money that belonged to him, Max locks Ian in the walk-in freezer there and threatens him.

After developing a friendship during lockdown, Max supports Shirley's stepdaughter Linda (Kellie Bright) when he catches her having a drink, despite battling an alcohol addiction. Linda's close friend and Phil's former wife Sharon Watts (Letitia Dean) finds out about Max's closeness with Linda and warns him to leave him alone, but Max and Linda soon kiss and begin a dalliance with each other. A guilty Linda tells Mick, who angrily warns Max off. However, Linda's marriage continues to fall apart as Mick pushes her away, and she and Max kiss again. Max uses Linda as an alibi after Ian is attacked by an unknown assailant and left for dead. Mick tells Linda to stay away from him, and, hurt, she goes to stay with Max and the pair have sex. Linda becomes suspicious when Max starts to behave secretively, and it is revealed that Max had disposed of Linda's award from the Lucy Beale Foundation, assuming that Linda had attacked Ian. Max decides to join Lauren and Louie in New Zealand and asks Linda to follow him, but she says no, so he leaves Abi in the care of Rainie and her new husband Stuart Highway (Ricky Champ) before leaving the square alone. Several months later, Jack takes Abi to visit Max in France, but returns without Abi and confirms to his fiance Denise Fox (Diane Parish) that Max has fled and taken Abi with him. He does not attend his stepmother Dot's funeral in 2022, and Lauren reveals that they are not on speaking terms since she caught Max sleeping with her best friend.

=== 2025–present ===
In September 2025, Kat's estranged daughter Zoe (Michelle Ryan) is accidentally shot by Jack and his nemesis Ravi Gulati (Aaron Thiara) during a showdown between the two men. While waiting for help, Zoe reveals to Kat that she is in danger from an enemy whom she doesn't identify. Zoe is taken to hospital for emergency surgery. Someone rings Zoe's phone and Kat answers. Thinking it must be the enemy Zoe mentioned, Kat menacingly warns the person that they will be caught. Without responding, the person disconnects the call and it is revealed that the caller is Max. The time flashes to months earlier where Max hears Zoe's name in a bar and asks if she is related to Stacey and Kat and says he knows them. They sleep together where Zoe tells Max she's been spending her life savings trying to find her son. After giving her a necklace, Max agrees to lend Zoe £5,000 to give to a neighbour, Greg Dolan (Dean Williamson), who apparently knows something about Zoe's son. However, Greg demands more money to give Zoe information, and when he tries to rape her, Zoe attacks him in self-defence. Leaving him seemingly lifeless, Zoe dashes out of the flat. Panicking, she orders Max to drive, but he refuses, unwilling to be implicated. Furious, Zoe leaves after telling Max he was nothing to her and rips off the necklace he gave her. Meanwhile, while Zoe is in hospital, Max calls and hears Stacey on the phone. Zoe later calls Max telling him she wants her necklace but to stay away. In response, Max tells her that he hates being told what to do. He briefly returns to Albert Square uannounced months later for Lauren's wedding to Peter, reuniting with a teenage Oscar (now Pierre Counihan-Moullier) and confronting both Zoe and Stacey, confessing feelings for both. After being caught kissing Zoe by Stacey, she ultimately ignores Max's profession of love and leaves the Square, angering his family for focusing on flings over his children resulting in Max leaving once again.

Just two months later, Max returns to the square during Christmas 2025 to attend the christening of Lauren's infant son Jimmy Beale. He is shocked to discover Linda's four-year-old daughter Annie (Lois Hawkins) is actually his child as a result of their dalliance, and is angered to discover his family knew about it but didn't tell him. Max tells off his family and confronts Jack during Christmas dinner only for Kathy to drunkenly reveal Jack and Stacey had slept together back in 2023, resulting in Max punching Jack before being kicked out. He drowns his sorrows at the Prince Albert Bar unaware it is owned by Ian's ex-wife and Peter's mother Cindy Beale (Michelle Collins), also the mother of both Steven and Lucy who is also unaware of Max's identity. The two sleep together only to discover each other's identities during the christening, leading to Max and Peter fighting and Cindy slapping Max, blaming him for Steven's death. He attempts to make amends by protecting Oscar from his girlfriend Jasmine Fisher (Indeyarna Donaldson-Holness), who is actually Zoe's long-lost secretive daughter, but is lambasted by his family again when Jasmine falsely accuses Max of attempting to kiss her. Max is confronted by Cindy, who was previously attacked by Jasmine, and they decide to work together to bring her down. However, Cindy hides the evidence that Jasmine killed her father Anthony Trueman (Nicholas Bailey) in self-defence.

At this point, Max and Linda continue to grow closer as he bonds with Annie; soon enough she kisses Max and briefly considers starting a relationship with him, but she catches later catches him kissing Cindy and leaves. Max and Cindy decide to get into relationship after being in a car crash with Jimmy and the three survive. Linda decides to make Max jealous by sleeping with Phil's brother Grant (Ross Kemp), and this works as Max proceeds to confront Grant about the trouble his son Mark (Stephen Aaron-Sipple) is causing with Lauren at the car lot. To make Linda jealous, Max offers to move in with Cindy and she accepts. He then proposes to Cindy but she declines.

By then, Max has employed Ravi's old flame Priya Nandra-Hart (Sophie Khan Levy) to work for him. She is heartbroken over her fallout with Ravi and seduces Max, who gives in. Later, Cindy accepts Max's proposal. However, at their engagement party, Max and Priya become intimate again in the toilets and they subsequently begin a fling with each other; this continues despite the pair initially agreeing to end the matter. To complicate things further, on the evening of Max's stag do, Max is shocked and devastated when Linda admits that she is in love with him. He is also threatened by Ravi when the latter finds out about his secret with Priya and warns him to stay away from her. Max goes through with the wedding following pressure from Jack, but breaks it off the same night after suffering a heart attack; Cindy subsequently discovers his affairfling with Priya and exposes it to everyone in the pub. After ending his marriage to Cindy, he and Linda begin a secret relationship but are spotted by Zoe herself. Max confronts Zoe in her bedroom and threatens her into silence before abandoning her in her room whilst suffering from dizziness, believing her to be drunk rather than suffering from a head injury she had sustained earlier in the day; she dies as a result but not before making a confused pocket 999 call stating "He left me". Max later comforts Kat over her loss and is unnerved when she vows to find out who left Zoe to die, swearing revenge for what happened. Max confides in Oscar that he had inadvertently played a part in Zoe’s death, and Oscar accidentally tells Cindy, who begins blackmailing him for £50,000 in exchange for her silence.

== Reception ==
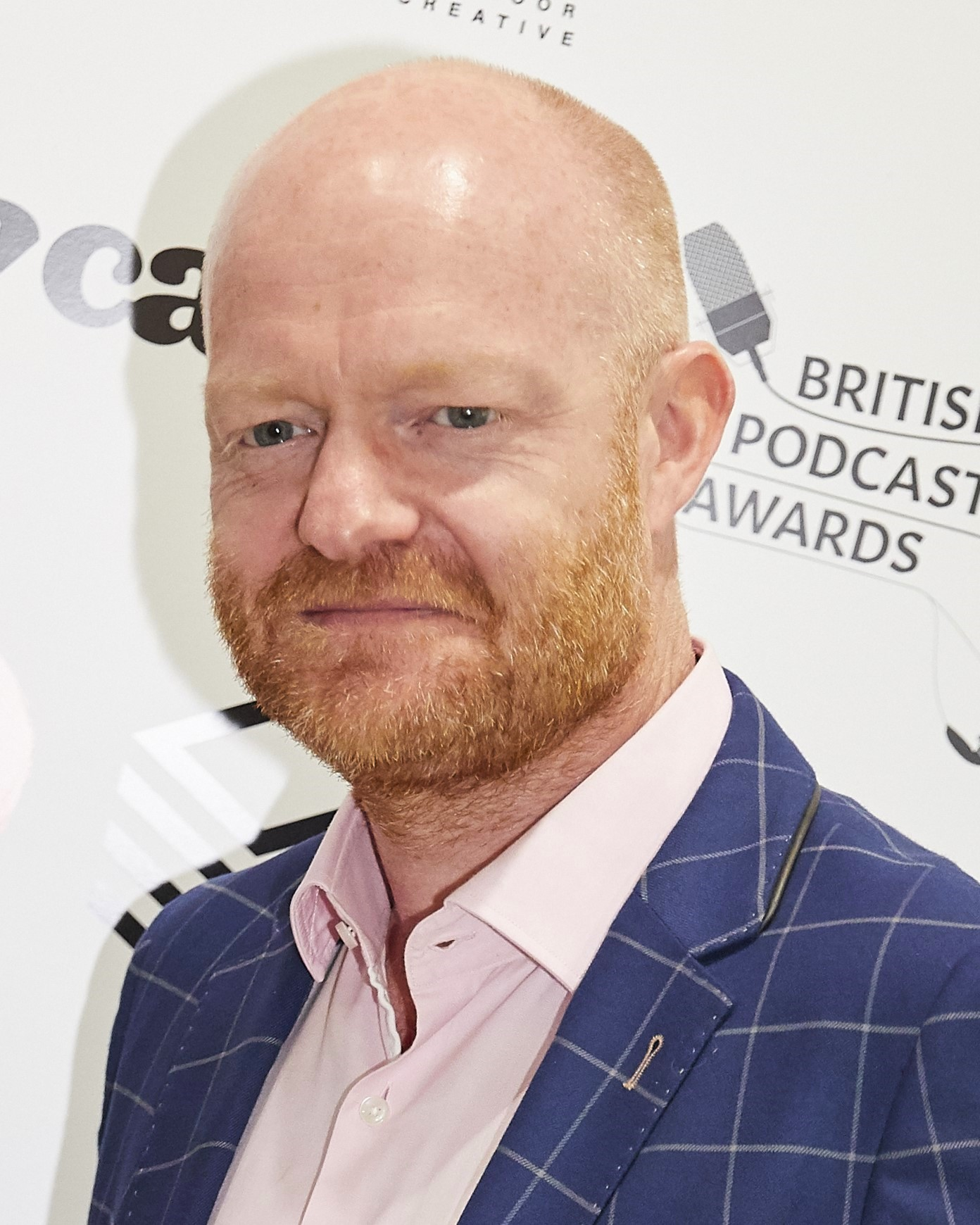
Jake Wood was nominated for fourteen awards for his portrayal of Max.

The storyline which saw Tanya bury Max alive prompted 167 viewer complaints, citing the inappropriate nature of the scenes, which aired prior to the 9.00 pm watershed. The BBC responded with the statement: "Whilst we appreciate that these episodes were dramatic, they were carefully filmed and edited in order that Max's ordeal was in the main implicit, rather than explicit, whilst still retaining their powerfulness. It's also important to note that Max made it out alive after Tanya realised she couldn't go through with her plan to leave him for dead. The burial is in no way glamorised or glorified, rather we see that when pushed to the edge, Tanya's behaviour becomes out of character, and indeed that it's Tanya herself who ultimately suffers because of her actions. Once again we are sorry that you did not enjoy these episodes." The UK communications regulator Ofcom later found that the episodes depicting the storyline were in breach of the 2005 Broadcasting Code. They contravened the rules regarding protection of children by appropriate scheduling, appropriate depiction of violence before the 9pm watershed and appropriate depiction of potentially offensive content.

Following Max's appearance in a single episode in 2016, a reporter writing for the Inside Soap Yearbook 2017 (released in November 2016) expressed their disappointment at "one glimpse" of Max, adding that it was "not good enough".

Wood has received a number of award nominations for his portrayal of Max. Wood was nominated for "Best Actor" at the 2007 Inside Soap Awards. Also in 2007, he was nominated for Best Newcomer at the TV Quick and TV Choice Awards, and Best Soap Actor the following year and in 2010. In 2008 and 2009, he was nominated for Best Actor at the Inside Soap Awards, Also in 2009 he was nominated for Best Actor at The British Soap Awards. In 2010, he was nominated in the Outstanding Serial Drama Performance category at the National Television Awards, but was not shortlisted, and in February 2011, Wood was nominated for Best Actor in the Soap Bubble Awards for his portrayal of Max. In 2012, Wood and Joyner won the Best On-Screen Partnership category at the British Soap Awards. On Digital Spy's 2012 end of year reader poll, Wood was nominated for "Best Male Soap Actor" and came third with 15.2% of the vote. In August 2017, Wood was longlisted for Best Actor and Best Bad Boy at the Inside Soap Awards, while the revelation that Max is in a secret relationship with Fi was longlisted for Best Shock Twist. Wood made the shortlist in the Best Bad Boy category, although lost out to Connor McIntyre, who portrays Pat Phelan in Coronation Street. In 2020, Sara Wallis and Ian Hyland from The Daily Mirror placed Max 16th on their ranked list of the Best EastEnders characters of all time, writing how he "is notorious for family feuds and flings and brushes with the law" and was "Often topping lists of soap bad boys", as well as calling the 2007 Christmas Day reveal of his affair with Stacey as "one of the soap's best doof doofs".

== See also ==
- List of soap opera villains
- "Who's Been Sleeping with Kat?"
- "Who Killed Lucy Beale?
