= Steven Beale =

Fictional character from EastEnders

- EastEnders character
- Aaron Sidwell as Steven Beale (2008)
- Portrayed by: Edward Farrell (1989–1990); Stuart Stevens (1992–1998); Edward Savage (1998–2002); Aaron Sidwell (2007–2017)
- Duration: 1989–1990, 1992–2002, 2007–2008, 2016–2017
- First appearance: Episode 511; 28 December 1989
- Last appearance: Episode 5560; 8 September 2017
- Introduced by: Mike Gibbon (1989); Leonard Lewis (1992); Jane Harris (1997); Diederick Santer (2007); Dominic Treadwell-Collins (2016)
- Edward Savage as Steven Beale (2002)
In-universe information
- Occupation: Student; Chip shop worker; Restaurant manager
- Family: Beale
- Father: Simon Wicks
- Mother: Cindy Beale
- Adoptive father: Ian Beale
- Half-brothers: Peter Beale; Bobby Beale (adoptive)
- Half-sisters: Lucy Beale; Cindy Williams; Gina Knight; Anna Knight
- Daughters: AJ Branning
- Grandfathers: Brian Wicks
- Grandmothers: Pat Butcher; Bev Williams
- Uncles: David Wicks
- Aunts: Gina Williams
- Nephews: Louie Beale; Jimmy Beale
- Nieces: Beth Williams
- First cousins: Bianca Jackson; Joe Wicks
- Other relatives: Kevin Wicks

Steven Beale is a fictional character from the BBC soap opera EastEnders, played by Edward Farrell from 1989 to 1990, Stuart Stevens from 1992 to 1998, Edward Savage from 1998 to 2002, and Aaron Sidwell from 2007 to 2008 and again from 2016 to 2017. It was announced on 22 February 2008, that the character would be written out at the end of Sidwell's contract. Sidwell made his on-screen departure on 9 May 2008. On 2 May 2016, it was announced that Sidwell would return to the role. Steven made his return on 27 May 2016. On 9 August 2017, it was announced that Sidwell would leave the show again. Steven made his final exit on 8 September 2017, when the character was killed off during a high-profile stunt week.

In the 1990s, Steven's storylines mostly included his paternity and the ongoing custody battle between his mother, Cindy Beale (Michelle Collins), and his adoptive father, Ian Beale (Adam Woodyatt). In the early 2000s, a darker side to adolescent Steven emerged as he began writing poison pen letters to neighbours and blackmailing Ian over his affair with Janine Butcher (Charlie Brooks), before moving to New Zealand to be with his biological father. In the late 2000s, Steven's storyline focused on his hostile relationship with his dad and involved stalking Ian and taking him hostage, multiple suicide attempts, and accidentally shooting his stepmother, Jane (Laurie Brett). Steven also briefly dates Stacey Slater (Lacey Turner) but struggles with his sexuality and an attraction to Jane's brother Christian Clarke (John Partridge). He also attempts to murder his grandmother, Pat Butcher (Pam St Clement).

Following his 2016 return, Steven becomes deceitful with his girlfriend Lauren Branning (Jacqueline Jossa) by having an affair with her sister Abi Branning (Lorna Fitzgerald), which sparks the events of the character being responsible for Abi's pregnancy; fabricating a lie about having a brain tumor; and nearly killing Jane again after Lauren and Abi's father, Max Branning (Jake Wood), blackmails him in setting fire to his dad's restaurant in his plan to kill her as revenge for her contribution to getting him wrongfully imprisoned for the murder of his half sister Lucy Beale (Hetti Bywater), who was previously killed by their half-brother Bobby Beale (Eliot Carrington). Ultimately, Steven contemplates rescuing Jane and ends up getting injured in the fire by Max, which consequently triggers the character suffering a fatal cardiac arrest in the hospital, he dies, and his lies are soon discovered at his funeral a week later.

== Creation and development ==
=== Early storylines ===
The character's conception was a part of one of the most notable storylines in EastEnders during 1989, a love triangle between Cindy Williams (played by Michelle Collins), Simon Wicks (played by Nick Berry) and Ian Beale (played by Adam Woodyatt). Steven was the result of a one-night stand (in the bar of The Queen Victoria public house) between Cindy and Simon, occurring while Cindy was engaged to Ian Beale in May 1989. Viewers knew that Cindy was carrying Simon's child; however, between characters in the serial, Steven's true paternity was kept secret, with only Cindy, Simon, and later Simon's mother Pat Butcher (Pam St Clement) knowing the truth, though neither Simon or Pat would believe Cindy's claim initially. Simon's rejection of Cindy and her unborn child facilitated a plot twist that saw Cindy pretend that the child was Ian's.

The character's birth occurred in an episode that aired on 28 December 1989, although in the on-screen events, he was born on Boxing Day. In the storyline, Steven was born two months prematurely, and was therefore supposed to be small; however, the baby who originally played Steven, Edward Farrell, was actually large for his age, and was nicknamed "Chunky" by actor Adam Woodyatt. According to former EastEnders writer David Yallop, it had been agreed in September 1989 that Steven Beale would be killed off in the serial. This was part of producer Mike Gibbon's plan to increase the ratings by culling a large number of the soap's long-running cast. Yallop said, "We had to reach a decision with the illegitimate child who was in the process of being born as a result of an earlier storyline. We wanted to know what to do with it. Either the child would be allowed to live, or it would die. They decided to make the child 'seriously ill', but the reprieve was temporary. In episode 606 I resolved the problem." He claimed that on his draft of the storyline he wrote the words "Baby die". The plot never came to fruition, as Gibbon was abruptly replaced as the soap's boss and Yallop's plots were scrapped.

According to the EastEnders Handbook by Hilary Kingsley, casting babies for roles in EastEnders is usually done locally, so that children and their parents do not have to travel far when they are called into the studios at BBC Elstree Centre. Because of the strict laws dictating the number of hours babies are permitted to work, occasionally dolls or understudies have to be used if the child runs out of time. This occurred with Steven's original actor, Edward Farrell, in 1990. The baby had been scripted to appear at a Guy Fawkes Night party; however, actress Michelle Collins, who played his screen mother Cindy, has since revealed that they used another baby for those scenes: "Not only was she a girl, she also had bright red hair whereas Edward was fair. I had to keep pushing her hair back under her hat but lots of [viewers] still spotted it". Young Farrell was also the reason viewers never saw Cindy wearing her red wedding dress on-screen again following its next outing at Steven's christening in February 1990. It was a dress that Michelle Collins particularly disliked. She has commented, "When Edward was sick over it, I knew it wouldn't recover and I kissed him for it."

Before his first screen birthday, Steven was central to storylines surrounding his parents and stepfather Ian, including a special week of off-set episodes filmed in Devon, where Ian discovered that his best friend Simon was Steven's real father and that he had reunited with Cindy. The love triangle between Simon, Cindy and Ian, and the events surrounding Steven's paternity dominated the soap during 1990; it has been described by writer Colin Brake as the year's "big story". Steven was written out of the serial after actors Nick Berry and Michelle Collins decided to leave the show. His exit aired on 27 December 1990, though in the on-screen events it was Boxing Day, Steven's first birthday. In 1992, Michelle Collins reprised her role of Cindy, and Steven was also reintroduced, played by a different actor, Stuart Stevens. On-screen, Simon abandoned Cindy and Steven. Ian traced them to a bedsit and brought them back to Walford, where Steven was brought up as Ian's real son. Steven was written out once again in 1996, when Collins quit for a second time.

In the on-screen events, Cindy absconded with Steven and his half brother Peter following Cindy's failed attempt to have Ian assassinated. Upon his return in 1997 – where Ian once again regained custody – Steven's role was recast with another actor, Edward Savage. As the character aged, his actor was given a more substantial role in the serial, Steven remaining with Ian following the death of his mother, who died in prison during child birth. Savage remained in the role until 2002, when he opted to leave. On-screen, Steven discovered that Ian had been lying about his paternity. He began rebelling, and was found to be the author of several mysterious poison pen letters. When he was caught, he demanded to travel to New Zealand, so he could meet his real father, Simon Wicks. A BBC source commented to the Daily Star, "Regular viewers will know Steven is a deeply troubled boy. But his unmasking as the poison pen author is going to shock everyone on the Square. The lad is almost inviting punishment. It's as if he wants Ian and [his stepmother] Laura to wash their hands of him. Could Steven be a new Nick Cotton in the making?"

=== Reintroduction (2007); stalking, kidnapping and mental illness ===
In 2005, the British media claimed that the character of Steven was due to return to EastEnders, three years after he had last appeared. The Sunday Mirror speculated that EastEnders bosses were hoping to cast an Australian actor to play Steven, to signify that he had been in New Zealand. It was claimed that actors from Australia's long-running soaps, Neighbours or Home and Away, were being considered. The rumours turned out to be false, and a subsequent rumour in January 2007 predicting that Footballers' Wives' actor Craig Gallivan was to play the role, was also quashed.

The character was eventually to make his return in September 2007, reintroduced by executive producer Diederick Santer as part of a storyline that saw Ian being stalked and terrorised by a mystery person, claiming to be his deceased ex-wife, Cindy. After weeks of watching Ian tormented, viewers saw Ian lured to the top of a deserted block of flats, where Ian came face to face with his harasser, Steven. For several weeks, Ian was kept locked up in the derelict flat, while Steven returned to Albert Square to bond with his brother and sister, Peter and Lucy. Aaron Sidwell was cast in the role of Steven, making him the fourth actor to play him. It was Sidwell's first television role, and he has described it as "a bit daunting...but everyone was really welcoming...the first few directors I worked with were fantastic...After we did rehearsal, after we did a take, they'd always give me feedback...I needed it." He added, "I have been so lucky. Not many people get the chance to work on such a huge show, and my entrance was pretty impressive. I still wake up and think: 'Oh my God, I'm in EastEnders.' It's brilliant." Describing the motives behind Steven's actions, Sidwell said "[Steven] was raised for 13 years thinking he was Ian's son...but he wasn't...He sees Ian as the cause of Cindy's death, because Cindy died in prison, and she went to prison because Ian put her there...so that's how he kind of sees that it's Ian's fault...very narrow-minded... Steven is..a messed up kid and when I first got the part I was given a catchphrase that describes him as a person...'look at me'...he wants to be in the limelight 100%...he wants people to be thinking about him [all the time]...that's why he got angry with Ian because Ian wasn't thinking about him... he's the most important person in the world."

The storyline eventually reached its climax in October 2007. Steven's games were uncovered, and during the confrontation that followed, Steven threatened to kill himself, but accidentally shot Ian's wife Jane (Laurie Brett) and a resulting emergency hysterectomy meant that Jane could no longer have children of her own. The storyline has been described by The Guardian journalist, Stephen Armstrong, as having "a whiff of Brontë about it", which producer Diederick Santer agreed with. Santer added, "It's a classic madwoman in the attic story, but I hate those articles where someone who works in popular television says what they do is like Dickens. It's about the balance. That story works because it has an old character whom the audience love – Ian Beale – as well as new characters who have an appeal for teenagers fresh to the show. Soap audiences like continuity. They dip in and out and if they haven't watched for a few weeks, then tune in to find no one they recognise, it can be disconcerting."

Mentally ill, Steven was admitted to a psychiatric hospital by Ian. Sidwell has commented on Steven's mental instability: "He's so unpredictable...you never know what he's going to do next...He'll be normal one minute and he'll be crazy the next. He's kind of the Donnie Darko of EastEnders...that's the kind of person I styled him after...[he is] a similar character...He is always going to be a bit unstable and there will always be danger. I don't think even he knows what he's going to do next – but he's deadly, so don't let the nice guy act fool you."

Steven returned to the serial as a regular character following his release from hospital. Subsequent plots saw him unsuccessfully attempting to make amends with Ian and Jane for his past wrongdoing. The character also formed a friendship with Stacey Slater (played by Lacey Turner), who stopped him from committing suicide in December 2007. In the on-screen events, Steven – infuriated by Ian's rejection – soaked himself with petrol and threatened to light himself on fire. In the end, Stacey managed to persuade him not to go through with suicide by showing him that friends can be just as important as family. Despite hostilities from Jane, Steven gradually regained Ian's trust, and in episodes that aired over the Christmas period of 2007, Ian welcomed Steven back into his home as part of the Beale family.

=== Departure (2008); sexuality and Lucy's disappearance ===
In February 2008, the BBC announced that Steven was being written out of EastEnders once again. An EastEnders spokeswoman revealed: "[Sidwell]'s contract has run out – he only came for that length of contract. But his character came in dramatically and he'll go out dramatically."

The buildup to Steven's exit involved in a bisexual love triangle storyline between him, Stacey and Christian Clarke (John Partridge), who is the gay brother of Jane. On-screen, Steven and Stacey's friendship progressed into something more serious in March 2008, when they shared a kiss. Steven later decided he was ready to lose his virginity to Stacey, and took Ian's advice "to try to name the England football team and substitutes as a technique for pacing himself," which Sidwell has described as, "a really funny scene to film [...] my favourite comedy moment since joining the show."

Speaking of the character's impending exit, he added: "Steven loves Stacey as a friend, and would do anything for her. He misreads loving someone as being 'in love', though. Things aren't right between them, and he can't put his finger on the reason why. That's what's going to lead him to question his sexuality..." On-screen, Steven was unable to consummate his love for Stacey, and after an emotional rant, he kissed Christian. The filming of the storyline posed difficulties for Aaron Sidwell; in an interview with the Daily Star he explained, "[Lacey Turner's] a really good friend of mine, so kissing her was weird, but we just got on with it! But I found it really challenging to kiss [John Partridge] because I'm not gay [...] I saw the conflict teenagers go through when they're struggling to come to terms with their sexuality. [The gay kiss] is a cracking scene and I'm really pleased with it." The storyline progressed with Steven denying his homosexual tendencies, leading Christian to continuously try and "out" him. John Partridge, has commented, "Christian knew Steven was gay from the outset. He noticed Steven had tendencies that he himself had as a young man – and his gaydar is very good [...] Christian didn't ask to be kissed by Steven but now that it's happened, he wants the boy to admit that he's gay. He basically wants to help him. Steven doesn't want to be gay, and Christian knows how he feels. Coming out is hard for any young man [...] Christian's worried that Stacey is going to get hurt. He knows that when you're gay, you're gay. That's it. There's nothing you can do about it and if you try to hide it, people get hurt." After the truth was revealed to Stacey, Steven falsely claimed to Ian that Christian had attempted to seduce him, as a means of revenge for Christian's rejection. The following episode, Christian was banished from the Beales' lives by Ian, although the truth eventually came out, and Ian, despite initial concerns, was shown to be supportive of Steven's sexuality. The plot was described as "controversial", and gay actor John Partridge has confessed that he had worries about it initially: "A gay man having any sort of relationship with an 18-year-old boy is a bit contentious. However, I think it has been handled really well."

A final twist in Steven's story was his involvement in a seemingly unrelated plotline that had been running simultaneously to Steven's personal dilemma, the disappearance of his half-sister Lucy (Melissa Suffield). In episodes that aired in May 2008, it was revealed that Steven had been hiding his runaway sister in a caravan, poisoning her mind against Ian and persuading her to flee the country.

Explaining his character's motives, Sidwell said, "It's all about Ian again. Steven wants all Ian's love and attention and he feels Lucy is getting in the way. She's the one who gets most of Ian's time and energy and he thinks getting her out of the picture will leave Ian all for him [...] He's been brainwashing her into thinking Ian doesn't care if she never goes home again [...] His real plan is to keep her out of Ian's life for good [...] He craves Ian's full attention and is willing to do whatever it takes to make that happen. He doesn't exactly plan to be evil but he is dangerous." In the end Steven's plan was discovered by his grandmother Pat, leading Steven to attempt to suffocate her to death before she revealed the truth to Ian. An EastEnders source told Digital Spy: "Steven hits rock bottom when Pat finds out that he's been hiding Lucy for all these weeks while his family have been frantically searching for her [...] when Pat realises that Steven knows where Lucy is, he takes drastic steps to prevent his beloved nan from revealing all to Ian. He goes from confused to psycho in a matter of minutes, grabbing a pillow and pushing it onto her face." Sidwell added, "Steven is deadly! He is willing to do whatever it takes to get what he wants including murder."

The murder attempt was stopped by Ian, and after discovering the truth from Pat, Ian chased Steven to London's St. Pancras Station (where he was intending to put Lucy on the Eurostar to Paris) and convinced Lucy to return home. Sidwell commented, "Steven is such a good manipulator he thinks Lucy will side with him. He's shocked when she doesn't and when she agrees to go home with Ian." Steven then departed from Walford after Ian vowed to kill him if he ever saw him again.

Sidwell made his last appearance on-screen as Steven on 9 May 2008, and he has since revealed that producers made the right decision in axing his character as his story arc had run its course: "They really did try to keep Steven in. The problem is EastEnders is a realistic show, so with Steven being a larger-than-life character it was always going to be hard having him doing the same crazy things day in, day out. I wasn't expecting to stay on the Square forever. It was my first big job out of drama college and I couldn't have asked for a better start in the industry. I've had a great time and the character isn't being killed off, so who knows what might happen a few years down the line. There's always the possibility I might be asked back one day".

=== Reintroduction and death (2016–2017) ===
It was announced on 2 May 2016 that Sidwell had returned to filming as Steven as part of an explosive storyline. Sidwell revealed that as there were plans for Jacqueline Jossa to return in the role of Lauren Branning, it meant there was an opportunity for Steven to return as well. Sidwell said of his return, "I was happy to be asked back, it was the right time for me and the right time for the character. Enough time has passed for Steven to come back and have a different input and impact. It feels fresh. Steven has had enough time to grow up and change dramatically."

On 5 August 2017, it was revealed that one character out of Lauren Branning (Jacqueline Jossa), Louise Mitchell (Tilly Keeper), Bex Fowler (Jasmine Armfield), Ben Mitchell (Harry Reid), Keegan Baker (Zack Morris), Shakil Kazemi (Shaheen Jafargholi) and Steven would be leaving the show. On 9 August, the character was revealed to be Steven. An EastEnders spokesperson said: "Aaron Sidwell is part of one of the big upcoming storylines and we can confirm, following dramatic scenes to be aired later this summer, he will be leaving the show. We wish Aaron all the very best for the future."

== Storylines ==
=== 1989–2002 ===
Steven was born on 26 December 1989; his mother is Cindy Beale (Michelle Collins), and his father is Simon Wicks (Nick Berry). Even though Cindy is married to Ian Beale (Adam Woodyatt), she goes so far as to convince Ian that he is Steven's father. Simon becomes Steven's godfather, despite knowing that he is his biological father. Cindy tells Ian the truth when she and Simon reconcile. They leave Walford with Steven in December 1990.

Ian and Cindy reconcile in 1992, and Ian raises Steven as his son. In December 1993, Steven's half-siblings, twins Lucy and Peter, are born to Ian and Cindy. Unhappy in her marriage, Cindy hires a hitman to kill Ian in 1996, and when this fails, she snatches Steven and Peter and flees to Italy. In 1997, Ian tracks her, Steven, and Peter down and kidnaps them back. Cindy fights for custody and wins, but on the day she reclaims Steven, Lucy, and Peter, she is arrested when the hitman confesses to the attempted murder of Ian, and Ian gains custody of Steven, Lucy, and Peter. She supposedly died in childbirth in prison in November 1998, giving birth to a daughter, Cindy Jnr. Steven alone attends her funeral.

Steven then grows up with various different stepmothers, and though he grows close to them all, he feels abandoned when they leave. When Ian prepares to marry Laura Dunn (Hannah Waterman), Steven is anxious that they too will end up splitting; his fears are realised when he catches Ian kissing Janine Butcher (Charlie Brooks) in 2002. Initially a quiet, sensitive boy, Steven starts rebelling and skipping school. When Laura finds out, she confronts Steven, who reveals that Ian had kissed Janine. The subsequent rows have a negative effect on Steven; he becomes angry with the world and starts writing poison pen letters to people. Ian eventually finds out and confronts Steven. Following an argument, Steven goes to his room and overhears Ian calling him "Cindy's little brat!" Ian is forced to tell Steven that he is not his biological father. Distressed and angry, Steven decides to leave Walford to meet Simon, who lives in Auckland, New Zealand.

=== 2007–2008 ===
In September 2007, Steven returns and begins stalking Ian, pretending to be Ian's late wife, Cindy. He lures Ian to an empty block of flats and takes him hostage. Arriving back in Walford, he spends time reminiscing with Peter and Lucy, though Ian's new wife, Jane Beale (Laurie Brett) is initially wary of him, especially when he attempts to kiss her. When Steven's grandmother, Pat Evans (Pam St Clement) tells him that Ian always considers Steven his firstborn, blood related or not, Steven starts to regret what he has done. Wanting to confide in his sister, Steven takes Lucy to the flat where Ian is being held. Horrified, Lucy escapes and contacts Jane, while Ian confronts Steven about the reasons for his actions. Steven tells Ian that he blames him for his mother's imprisonment and death. He is angry that Ian had not retrieved him from New Zealand; living with his biological father had not been a happy experience, and he had ended up feeling rejected and in the way.

Steven then tries to commit suicide with a gun that Lucy gives him to dispose of. Ian, Jane, and Lucy try to stop him, a struggle ensues, and Jane is accidentally shot in the stomach; as a result, she undergoes an emergency hysterectomy and is left unable to have children. Ian admits Steven to a psychiatric hospital. When released, Steven goes off his medication. He tries to apologise to Jane and Ian, but finds them hostile. Hoping he will leave Walford, Ian humiliates and rejects Steven several times, going so far as to break a snow globe he had given to Steven when he was young right in front of him. Once again depressed, Steven tries to commit suicide by dousing himself in petrol; however, Stacey Slater (Lacey Turner) stops him from setting fire to himself. When Ian discovers what Steven has been planning to do, he reconciles with him. Displeased, Jane fights against Steven being part of her family, but eventually relents, and in January 2008, she agrees to let Steven move into the Beales' home; however, she makes it clear that she is waiting for him to mess up so he will be gone from her life for good.

Steven and Stacey grow closer in early 2008 as he supports her through the breakdown of her marriage. Steven is attracted to Stacey. She initially rejects his advances, but eventually agrees to date him. Their relationship progresses, until Steven decides that he is ready to lose his virginity, but their attempt at consummation ends in disaster when Steven cannot perform sexually. Embarrassed, Steven pretends that he has lost his virginity; however, Jane's brother Christian Clarke (John Partridge) realises he is lying and publicly announces it, leaving Steven humiliated. Steven confronts Christian, and, after releasing his pent-up anger and frustration, he spontaneously kisses Christian. Realizing Steven is bisexual, Christian tries to make Steven face up to his sexuality. Steven maintains that he is heterosexual and successfully has sex with Stacey, but their relationship soon ends when Christian tells Stacey that Steven kissed him.

Distraught, Steven propositions Christian, but is rejected. In revenge, Steven tells Ian that Christian had tried to seduce him. Ian is furious until Jane discovers the truth. Ian is full of praise for Steven; however, he does not realise that Steven has been hiding his runaway daughter, Lucy. Steven does not want to share Ian's attention, so he makes plans for Lucy to flee to France; however, Pat discovers his plan and is hit by a car as she is trying to apprehend him. Pat is hospitalised, and in order to stop her from telling Ian about Lucy, Steven tries to smother her with a pillow. Pat wakes up, but Steven continues in his murder attempt until Ian interrupts him. When Pat tells Ian about Lucy, Steven tries to deny it, but Ian sees through his lies. He traces Steven to St Pancras railway station and discovers him with Lucy. Steven has booked her a ticket on the Eurostar, but Ian persuades her not to go, and Steven flees. Later, back in Walford, Ian spots Steven spying on Lucy. Ian confronts him, admitting that he is glad that Steven is not his biological son. He tells him that if he ever returns to Albert Square, he will kill him. Devastated, Steven heads to the tube station and leaves Walford. In 2014, Peter reveals that Steven is living in New Zealand. Peter (now Ben Hardy) and fiancée Lauren Branning (Jacqueline Jossa) leave Walford for New Zealand to join Steven in February 2015.

=== 2016–2017 ===
In May 2016, Steven returns with Lauren and her son with Peter, Louie, after they learn that Jane is in hospital after being attacked by Ian's youngest son, Bobby (Eliot Carrington), who also confessed to killing Lucy in 2014. Ian initially rejects Steven, but Steven says he is back to help and repair any damage he caused in the past. Ian accepts Steven's offer to drive him to the hospital. Steven and Lauren do not tell anyone that they are together, but when Ian finds out, he throws them out. Ian eventually accepts Steven back into the family, but Jane is wary of him. Steven helps Ian at his restaurant and impresses him with his sales skills. Sadly, Jane soon finds an unfinished credit card application in Lucy's name and accuses Steven. Steven admits being responsible because he realised Ian is struggling financially. Ian promotes Steven to restaurant manager. When the restaurant is burgled, it is revealed that Steven arranged it and sold the kitchen equipment to pay debts. Stacey's half-brother, Kyle Slater (Riley Carter Millington), an employee at the restaurant, realises Steven arranged the burglary, so Steven sends him on a training course, and he admits to Lauren what he did. Later, Kyle asks Steven for a pay raise, saying he has kept quiet about the burglary, but Steven refuses.

Steven worries when Jane asks to look at the restaurant's accounts, as he has stolen money. He makes excuses not to let her use the restaurant's laptop and tells Lauren he will fake some invoices. Steven is overjoyed when Louie says his first word, "mama," and gets him to say "dada," filming it to show Lauren. However, she sends the video to Peter, upsetting Steven as he tells Lauren that he sees himself as Louie's father, but Lauren says Peter will always be Louie's father. Steven also worries that Lauren never says she loves him when he says it to her. When Jane looks at the restaurant's accounts and realises payments are being made to a fake company, she knows it can only be Ian or Steven but worries about confronting the wrong person. She soon discovers that Steven set up the fake company and confronts him; he explains he borrowed the money to help Peter, who was drinking heavily and getting into fights and Lauren does not know the whole truth, so Jane tells him to be honest with her. She is angry that Steven was not honest and considers visiting Peter; Steven says he wanted to protect her and Louie, and going to New Zealand out of guilt or pity will be a mistake.

Lauren meets Josh Hemmings (Eddie Eyre), a man who works in her father Max Branning's (Jake Wood) office, and they are attracted to each other. Josh encourages Lauren to apply for a job there, but Steven is unimpressed by Lauren's plans as he wants her to spend more time with him and Louie. He suggests that they start trying for a baby but Lauren refuses because she wants to concentrate on her career, so Steven secretly pierces holes in condoms. Lauren gets a job at the company and tells Steven that she barely sees Josh, but Steven visits her at work and sees her with Josh, and he becomes suspicious. Steven is unaware that Lauren is pregnant and planning an abortion, although her sister Abi Branning (Lorna Fitzgerald) makes him question Lauren and Josh's relationship. During an argument with Abi, who resents Lauren, Steven is stunned to hear Lauren aborted his child. A few days later, following Abi's 21st birthday party, another disagreement between Abi and Steven ends with them sleeping together. Sometime after, Steven has sex with Abi again after seeing footage of Lauren and Josh. Despite the affair with Abi, Steven insists he wants to be with Lauren and Abi does her best to poison his mind against her. When Lauren tells Josh that she doesn't love Steven, Abi persuades her to return to New Zealand. Just as she is about to leave, Josh visits Steven and tells him that Lauren has resigned from her job. Steven bashes his head against the wall, causing it to bleed. He later bumps into Lauren before she leaves and she plans to end their relationship, but notices Steven's head injury. In a desperate act to keep Lauren with him, Steven lies the injury is caused by him trying to remove a brain tumour, claiming that he has cancer and he is dying.

Although Abi discovers the truth, she decides not to tell Lauren after Steven tells her he is planning to leave Lauren to be with her. However, Steven tells Lauren he wants to adopt Louie and stuns Abi by proposing marriage to Lauren in The Queen Vic. When Lauren leaves Walford to visit Tanya, conflicted on her relationship with Steven, Max tells him he knows he lied about the brain tumour and gives him an ultimatum: help him move some clients from his property or he will tell Lauren the truth. Max tells Steven to set fire to the flat while making sure the clients safely exit the premises. Steven refuses and tells Max that he will tell Lauren the truth when she returns and tells Abi that their affair was a mistake. However, when Lauren texts to say that she will be staying with Tanya for longer, Steven agrees to Max's plan. However, the plan appears to backfire when the residents hear sirens of fire engines, police cars and ambulances. Max finds Steven in The Vic alleyway and Steven tells him he does not know if the clients exited the flat. Max tells Steven that he is on his own as he drove Ian's car to the flat, while dismissing Steven's claim that if he goes to prison, Max will go down too. Max tells him to find an alibi, so Steven asks Abi. Steven tells Max that he has an alibi and mentions that the clients did exit the flat. Jane later discovers Max's revenge plan and Steven's brain tumour lie and Max convinces Steven that Jane is trying to get rid of him.

Steven confronts Jane and blames her for Max's behaviour, but Jane tries to reason with Steven, and reveals Abi is pregnant. However, Steven refuses to believe her, and after berating her about framing Max for Lucy's murder, sets fire to the restaurant, and leaves Jane to perish in the flames. Believing Lauren trapped inside, Steven and Max run back into the inferno and Steven saves Abi, who became trapped upon finding, and attempting to save Jane. Max tried to get Steven to kill Jane, but he refuses and tries to save her. Max violently shoves him into a countertop, causing Steven to be rushed to hospital where he tells Abi that he loves her and will try to make their relationship work. He then suffers a cardiac arrest and dies from his injuries. When Steven's lies are revealed, it is also revealed that Steven died of injuries to the liver (likely from when Max pushed him) and so only Abi attends his funeral and reads a eulogy dedicated to him. Abi then has Steven cremated and hides his ashes away from Lauren when they visit their mother Tanya Branning (Jo Joyner) in Exeter. However, Lauren eventually discovers the truth after finding Abi in her wedding dress. Horrified by what she has learned, Lauren tries to flush Steven's ashes down the toilet, but Abi stops her, eventually telling her the truth about her pregnancy with his baby.

In December 2017, Abi and Lauren learn about their father's scheme before discovering his knowledge over the former's pregnancy with Steven's baby. They eventually find out on Christmas that year the truth about Steven's death when their mother Tanya reveals that Max killed him – causing them to disown their father, who subsequently gets into a fight with Ian when he and his mother Kathy (Gillian Taylforth) learn the truth as well; the latter then explains this to Phil, who then confronts and attacks Max. Shortly afterwards, Abi and Lauren fall from the Queen Vic roof; both survive and are taken to hospital, where an ultrasound shows Abi and Steven's baby is alive. Fearing that Abi may go into cardiac arrest following her devastating diagnosis of brainstem death, the doctors decide to deliver her and Steven's daughter, Abi Jnr, via caesarean section. Soon after, the doctors switch off Abi's life support when it becomes clear that the chances of reviving her are impossible.

In 2023, it is revealed that Cindy was actually alive the entire time living under witness protection in Spain where she married George Knight (Colin Salmon) and gave birth to two more daughters, Gina (Francesca Henry) and Anna Knight (Molly Rainford), Steven's half-sisters who are upset they never got a chance to meet him and Lucy. In 2026, Cindy begins a relationship with Max, forgiving him for killing Steven.

== Reception ==
The Mirror's Tony Stewart commented that "With the exception of [Coronation Street's David Platt], no psycho kid has inflicted so much damage on his own family as deranged freak Steven Beale." He described Steven's exit storyline as sinister, exciting and compelling drama, adding that it was "sometimes hilarious and never less than thrilling".

Discussing the character's mental problems and his sexuality, Gareth McLean of The Guardian expressed concern that "in 'EastEnders', being gay is akin to being mentally unbalanced. Were Steven Beale's behaviour up until now not a cause for concern – kidnapping Ian, shooting Jane, spiriting Lucy away to a caravan to play with her mind – wait until he attempts to murder his granny. Homosexuality = mental illness..." Virgin Media included Steven in a list of villains in British soap operas, calling him "a wrong 'un through and through."

In August 2017, Sidwell was longlisted for Best Bad Boy at the Inside Soap Awards, while he and Lorna Fitzgerald (Abi Branning) were longlisted for Best Partnership and Steven's brain tumour lie was longlisted for Best Shock Twist. The nominations did not progress to the viewer-voted shortlist.

== See also ==
- List of soap opera villains
- List of soap operas with LGBT characters
