= Edward Savage (footballer) =

British footballer and former actor

Personal information
- Date of birth: 15 November 1989 (age 36)
- Place of birth: High Wycombe, Buckinghamshire, England

Youth career
- 2006–2008: Wycombe Wanderers

Senior career*
Years	Team	Apps	(Gls)
2007–2009	Wycombe Wanderers	4	(0)
- * Club domestic league appearances and goals as of 12:19, 27 January 2010 (UTC)

Edward William J. Savage (born 15 November 1989) is an English footballer and former child actor.

== Early life ==
Edward William J. Savage was born in 1989 in High Wycombe, Buckinghamshire.

== Career ==
Savage played Steven Beale in the BBC soap opera EastEnders, taking over the role from Stuart Stevens in 1992. Savage left EastEnders when his character was written out in 2002. The role was later recast to Aaron Sidwell.

Savage ended his acting career, opting for football. He played football for Wycombe Wanderers alongside his older brother Andrew, and attended John Hampden Grammar School. He also enjoys judo. He picked up the Alan Henry Gillot Award for the Best Youth Team Player, presented by Ian Culverhouse. His senior career was cut short after two seasons, following eight unsuccessful operations on a dislocated kneecap.
