= Mariposa Trust =

UK-based charity

- Founder: Zoë Clark-Coates
- Registration no.: 1151108
- Website: mariposatrust.org

The Mariposa Trust is a charity in the United Kingdom founded by Zoë Clark-Coates, to support people who have suffered baby loss, in pregnancy, at birth or in infancy. It holds public Services of Remembrance, of any or no religious faith, across the UK to acknowledge the loss of a baby by their families, and by arranging specialist support divisions to help people with their associated grief and trauma. It is one of the organizations that supports baby loss awareness week.

Clark-Coates and her husband Andy set up the trust after remortgaging their home. The charity soon generated more than 600,000 online hits per month. There are now 250 volunteers – doctors, midwives, counsellors, fundraisers, and ambassadors including Nigella Lawson and Gabby Logan.

It is a British charity that supports people through miscarriages, infant death, stillbirth and other problems with pregnancy and early parenthood. The charity has organised numerous "Saying Goodbye" services at cathedrals and minsters around Britain as well as fundraising events.

== Background ==
The organisation was founded by Zoe and Andy Clark-Coates, who lost five babies through miscarriage and wanted to use their experiences to help others. It launched in August 2012 and became a charity in March 2013. The primary aim of the charity is to support people who have lost a baby during any stage of pregnancy, at birth or during infancy.

Around one in four pregnancies in the UK (around 250,000 per year) end in a miscarriage, with a further 4,000 through stillbirth and infant deaths. The couple set up the charity because they believe that miscarriages and infant death are a taboo subject in Britain and that people can find it difficult to talk about.

== Events ==
The charity holds various "Saying Goodbye" services at cathedrals and minsters around Britain, with around 20 taking place in 2014. Locations have included cathedrals at Bradford, Lichfield, Derby, Exeter, York, Portsmouth and Glasgow. The services are provided for free and to all people of any or no faith.

The charity's work is supported by volunteers who organise various fundraising events around the country. Sky diving events, called 'Jump for Love', have taken place in eight locations across Britain in association with the charity. The charity aims to have 254 'jumpers', one for every 1000 babies lost each year. One event in Bristol was undertaken by a mother who had lost a baby two years prior in a miscarriage.

== Ambassadors and advocates ==
The charity has a range of ambassadors and advocates.
