= Lorna Fitzgerald =

English actress (born 1996)

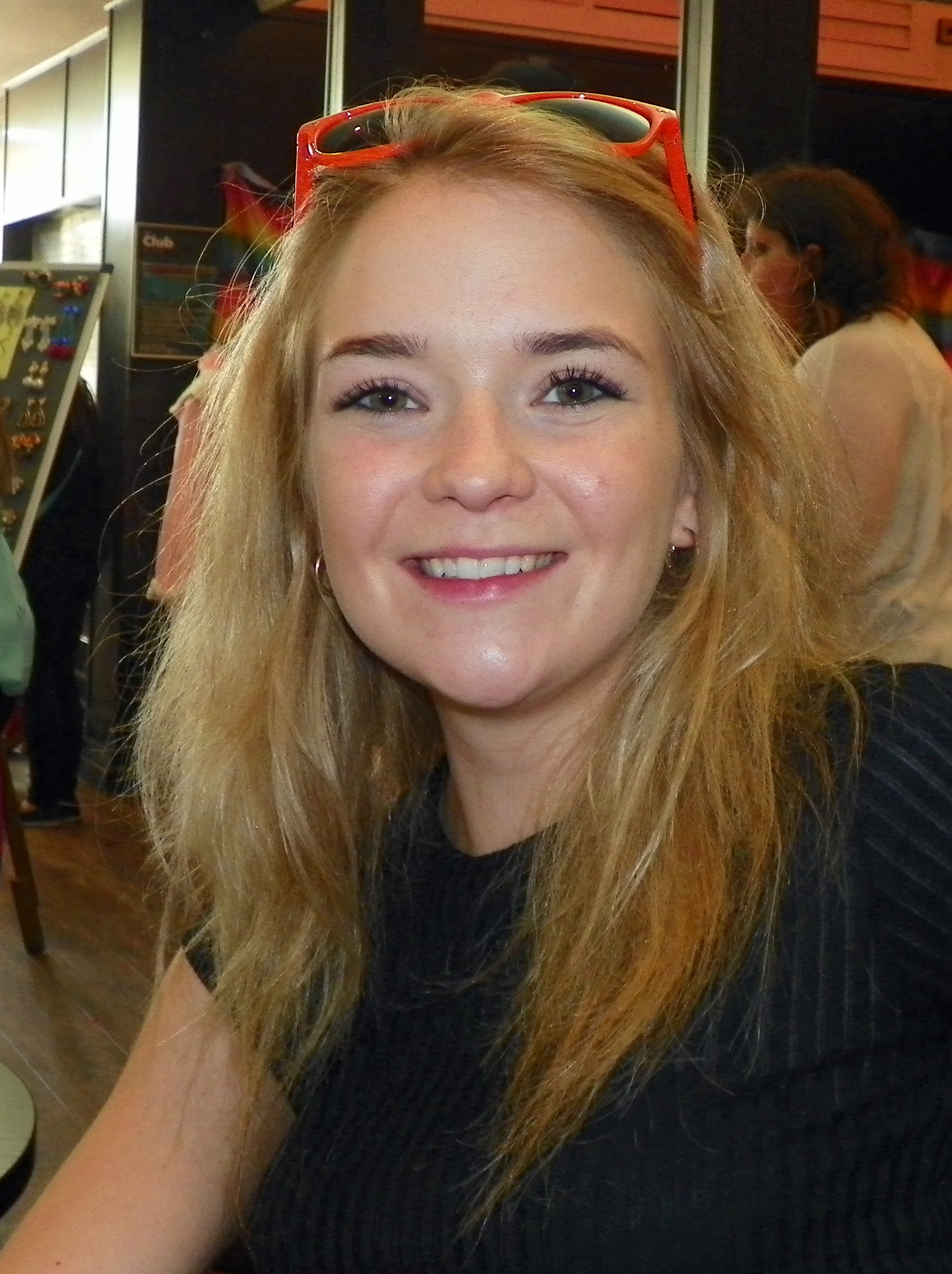
- Fitzgerald in 2016
- Born: Lorna Katie Fitzgerald; 17 April 1996 (age 30); Northampton, England
- Occupation: Actress
- Years active: 2005–present

Lorna Katie Fitzgerald (born 17 April 1996) is a British actress from Northampton. Her most notable role to date is that of Abi Branning in the BBC soap opera EastEnders. Since leaving EastEnders in January 2018, Fitzgerald has developed her acting career on the stage and in movies.

== Personal life ==
Fitzgerald started attending Stagecoach Drama Classes at the age of four. She has two older sisters and is a keen dancer. Fitzgerald also plays the guitar.

In November 2009, Fitzgerald was involved in a charity project in Northampton called Talking With Hands, a charity for people with hearing impairments and deafness. The project featured on ITV's Anglia News, alongside deaf actor Alex Nowak, and Fitzgerald helped with this project.

== Career ==
Fitzgerald has appeared in the Casualty episode "Animals", and a short film called Big Girl, Little Girl. She also appeared in the ITV drama The Golden Hour, as well as playing Sarah Lancashire's daughter Jade Cannings in Cherished, and Young Bex in According to Bex. She has appeared in adverts for Childline and Nescafé.

After attending acting classes, Fitzgerald joined the Stagecoach Theatre Arts School in Stony Stratford, and Derngate Theatre School. Her agent put her forward for a role in BBC One soap opera EastEnders, and after attending three auditions she was cast as Abi Branning. She made her first appearance as Abi in July 2006. On 10 September 2017, it was announced that Fitzgerald would be leaving the role after almost 12 years, with her exit airing on 19 January 2018.

Fitzgerald made her professional stage debut in February 2018, starring as Jackie Dimmock in the world premiere of Howard Brenton's The Shadow Factory in Nuffield Theatre, Southampton. She won acclaim for her debut performance and was shortlisted in the nominations for 'Best actress in a Play' at The Stage Debut Awards. In October 2018, Fitzgerald played the role of Eve Douglas in the regional premiere of Her Naked Skin by Rebecca Lenkiewicz at Salisbury Playhouse

Sustaining an early 20th century theme, in 2019 Fitzgerald starred as Iris Henderson in a stage version of Alfred Hitchcock's The Lady Vanishes. Adapted for stage by Bill Kenwright, this was a seven-month National Tour. Later in 2019, Fitzgerald was cast alongside Joan Collins and Luke Goss in the UK comedy drama film The Loss Adjuster. Filming began in October 2019, with release due on 1 December 2020. The movie is a straight-to-DVD release owing to the COVID-19 pandemic.

== Filmography ==
Year	Title	Role	Notes
2005	Cherished	Jade Cannings	Television film
2005	According to Bex	Young Bex	TV series
2005	Casualty	Polly Farrell	Episode: "Animals"
2005	The Golden Hour	Jasmine Campbell	1 episode
2006–2018	EastEnders	Abi Branning	Series regular; 917 episodes
2019	London Kills	Petra Roscoe	1 episode
2020	The Loss Adjuster	Emeline	Film

== Stage credits ==
Year	Title	Role	Venue
2018	The Shadow Factory	Jackie Dimmock	Nuffield Southampton Theatre
2018	Her Naked Skin	Eve Douglas	Salisbury Playhouse
2019	The Lady Vanishes	Iris Henderson	National Tour

== Awards and nominations ==
Year	Ceremony	Award	Work	Result
2010	Inside Soap Awards	Best Young Actor	EastEnders	Shortlisted
2012	British Soap Awards	Best Young Performance	EastEnders	Won
2014	Radio 1's Teen Awards	Best British Actor	EastEnders	Won
2015	Inside Soap Awards	Best Bad Girl	EastEnders	Longlisted
2017	Inside Soap Awards	Best Partnership (with Aaron Sidwell)	EastEnders	Longlisted
2017	Inside Soap Awards	Best Bad Girl	EastEnders	Shortlisted
2018	The Stage Debut Awards	Best Actress in a Play	The Shadow Factory	Shortlisted
