= Aaron Sidwell =

English actor (born 1988)

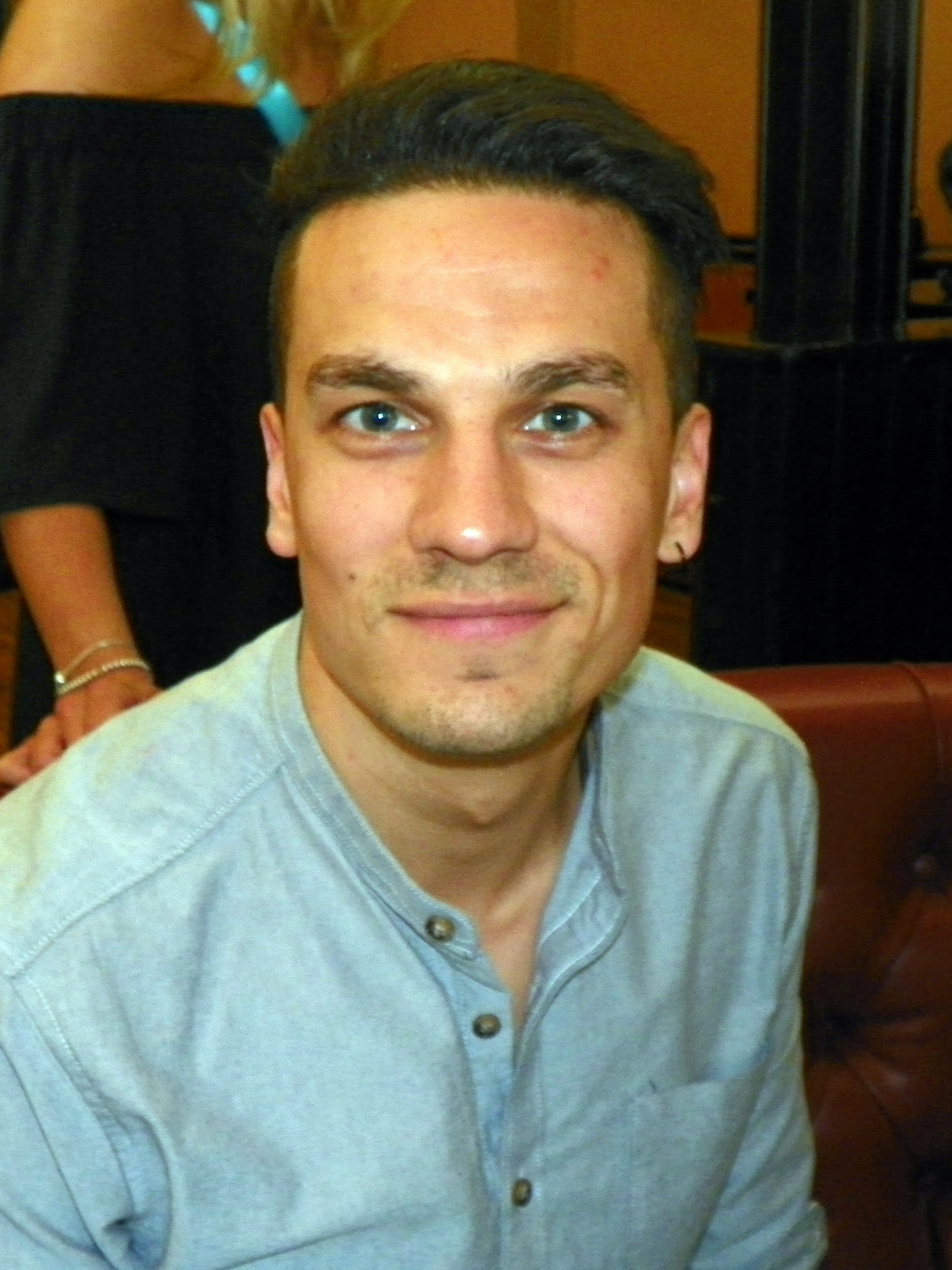
- Sidwell in 2016
- Born: Aaron Sidwell; 12 September 1988 (age 37); Maidstone, England
- Occupation: Actor
- Years active: 2007–present
- Television: EastEnders

Aaron Sidwell (born 12 September 1988) is an English actor, singer, musician and producer. He is known for playing Steven Beale on the BBC soap opera EastEnders, originating the role of Michael Dork in Loserville and being the first British actor to play Johnny in Green Day's musical American Idiot.

== Career ==
Sidwell was born in 1988, and grew up in the village of Kingswood, Kent. He was given a drama scholarship when he was eleven years old, at Bethany School. He started his acting career on stage and was a member of All Saints Choir. He worked for several years on the stage. Shortly after leaving, his big break came when he was cast as Steven Beale in the BBC soap opera, EastEnders; he took over the role from Edward Savage, who last appeared in 2002. Sidwell left the role in 2008.

At the end of April 2010, Sidwell started working on an online show called Almost, But Not Quite, playing the part of Josh Newell. In August 2011, he starred in a new musical called The Prodigals alongside X Factor's Lucie Jones, which made its debut at the Edinburgh Fringe Festival. In 2012, Sidwell made his West End debut in Children of Eden at the Prince of Wales Theatre, starring alongside Gareth Gates and Kerry Ellis. Sidwell took the part of Ham in Stephen Schwartz's musical. In June 2012, Sidwell headed up the cast of the brand new production Loserville: The Musical, playing Michael Dork at the West Yorkshire Playhouse, alongside Gates, Lil' Chris and Eliza Bennett. Loserville was then transferred to the West End's Garrick Theatre from October. Loserville: The Musical closed in January 2013. Sidwell received critical acclaim for his portrayal of Michael Dork, and the show was viewed as a cult hit. Sidwell posted on his Twitter account about the show, saying, "This show has changed my life in more ways than you will ever know. I am proud to say that I was part of something special."

Sidwell then returned to EastEnders in 2016, after an eight-year break from the soap. However, in August 2017, he announced his decision to leave the soap again. In May 2021, he appeared in an episode of the BBC soap opera Doctors as Joel Cooke.

In 2022, Sidwell made his debut with the Royal Shakespeare Company appearing in their productions of Henry VI: Part 2 and Henry VI: Part 3. The plays were rebranded as Rebellion and Wars of the Roses. He played Jack Cade in both plays as well as The Son and Hastings in Wars of the Roses.

The following year, Sidwell starred as Aragorn in the Watermill Theatre's revival of the Lord of the Rings (musical) musical. The show was semi immersive. Setting the shire in the grounds surrounding the theatre.

== Stage ==
Year	Title	Role	Venue
2010	The Prodigals	Kyle Gibson	Inspire
2011	Children of Eden	Ham	Prince of Wales Theatre
2012	Loserville	Michael Dork	West Yorkshire Playhouse / Garrick Theatre
2013	Carnaby Street	Jack Spratt	UK Tour
2014	Cool Rider	Michael Carrington	Lyric Theatre / Duchess Theatre
2014	Ghost	Carl Bruner	English Theatre Frankfurt
2014	Romeo and Juliet	Tybalt	Changeling Theatre Company
2015	American Idiot	Johnny	Arts Theatre
2016	Grey Gardens	Joe/Jerry	Southwark Playhouse
2017	Wicked	Fiyero	2nd U.K./Ireland Tour
2019	Henry V	Henry	Barn Theatre, Cirencester
2019	Macbeth	Macduff	The Shakespeare Project
2020	Buyer and Cellar	Alex More	Above The Stag
2020	A Midsummer Night's Dream	Demetrius/Peter Quince	Scoot Theatre Co., Open air tour
2020	Bard From The Barn	Mark Antony	Web Series - Barn Theatre, Cirencester
2020	Bard From The Barn	Hamlet	Web Series - Barn Theatre, Cirencester
2021	Distanced	Tom	Short online play
2022	Henry VI: Rebellion	Jack Cade	Royal Shakespeare Company
2022	Henry VI: Wars of the Roses	Jack Cade/ Hastings/ The Son	Royal Shakespeare Company
2023	Lord of the Rings	Aragorn	Watermill Theatre
2024/25/26	Oliver!	Bill Sikes	Chichester Festival Theatre / Gielgud Theatre

== Filmography ==
Date	Title	Role	Notes
2007–2008, 2016–2017	EastEnders	Steven Beale	Series regular (240 episodes)
2013	The Nephilum	Lewis	Film
2015	Doctors	Jack Jamieson	Episode: "A Proper Copper"
2021	Doctors	Joel Cooke	Episode: "Who Decides"
2024	Fyre Rises	Priest	Feature Film
2024	Father Brown	Luther Underwood	Episode: "The Father. The Son"
2025	Casualty	Tyler Gosage	Episode: “Defamation”
