= Episode 6944 =

2024 episode of EastEnders

- EastEnders episode
- Episode no.: Episode 6944
- Directed by: Karl Neilson
- Written by: Lauren Klee
- Original air date: 16 July 2024
- Running time: 29 minutes

Guest appearances
- Laurie Brett as Jane Beale; Jack Hyland as Spiker

Episode chronology
← Previous; Episode 6943	Next → Episode 6945

Episode 6944 of the BBC soap opera EastEnders was originally broadcast on 16 July 2024. One of the episode's plots revolves around Anna Knight (Molly Rainford) being spiked at a nightclub during a night out with her friends. The storyline had been announced by EastEnders beforehand and the soap's executive producer Chris Clenshaw had chosen Anna for the storyline as she was part of the demographic most affected by spiking. During the episode, there was a QR code for viewers to scan which allowed them to access a five part BBC mini-series, Spiked, that showed the spiking incident from the perspective of different characters, which was the first time it had been done in EastEnders. The episode also features a confrontation between Cindy Beale (Michelle Collins) and Jane Beale (Laurie Brett), the latter having returned to the soap unannounced in the previous episode. Brett revealed that she enjoyed working with Collins for the scenes. Jane's return and her confrontation with Cindy were well received by critics.

== Plot ==
At Jane Beale's (Laurie Brett) house in the country, Cindy Beale (Michelle Collins) is angry to discover that her partner and Jane's ex-husband Ian Beale (Adam Woodyatt) has been with her and assumes they are having an affair, which they deny. Jane also meets Cindy's ex-husband George Knight (Colin Salmon). Ian and Cindy's son Peter Beale (Thomas Law) arrives at the house in a van and discovers that his half-brother Bobby Beale (Clay Milner Russell), Jane's adoptive son, was hiding in the van and come with him. Jane reveals that she contacted Ian as she wanted to reconnect with Bobby. Bobby and Peter then walk in and Jane is really happy to see Bobby. Cindy storms out, angry that Jane covered up Bobby's killing of her daughter Lucy Beale (Hetti Bywater) back in 2014. Cindy admits to George that she feels insecure as Jane raised her children and George convinces her to talk to Jane.

Gina Knight (Francesca Henry) negatively talks to her sister Anna Knight (Molly Rainford) about Anna's relationship with Bobby. Lauren Branning (Jacqueline Jossa) is stressed about her son Louie Beale's (Jake McNally) struggle with maths. At Peggy's nightclub, Anna leaves her drink unattended. Back at Jane's house, Jane and Bobby discuss their lives. Ian and Cindy argue about Cindy's closeness with George. Cindy slaps Jane and Jane exclaims that she covered up Lucy's murder to protect Bobby, and Cindy is shocked when Jane reveals that Cindy's other son, Steven Beale (Aaron Sidwell), shot her and made her infertile. Bobby explains that he still struggles mentally and is unsure if he wants Jane back in his life as she covered up Lucy's murder.

At the nightclub, Anna begins to act strangely and very drunk after only drinking one drink and her friends become concerned that she has been spiked. Anna wanders off in the club and ends up collapsing and is followed by the man who spiked her. At the pub, Lauren apologises to Junior Knight (Micah Balfour) for being rude to him but reject his flirting. She then asks Jay Brown (Jamie Borthwick) about a vacant job at the car lot and Jay eventually offers her a trial shift. Cindy apologises to Jane for what Steven did and Jane apologises for what happened with Lucy. Ian and George then talk about Cindy and they realise that she is not good for them. Jane tells Cindy that she feels that Ian is lonely and deserves attention. Cindy demands that Ian take her home, but he refuses and threatens to end their relationship.

== Background and production ==
=== Spiking and spinoff ===
In July 2024, it was announced that BBC soap opera EastEnders would air a storyline where Anna Knight (Molly Rainford) would get her drink spiked during a night out at Peggy's Nightclub in the episode airing on 16 July 2024. It was teased that the incident would initially be unnoticed and Anna's friends would believe that her behaviour is due to drinking alcohol, but they would later become concerned when they realise that her behaviour "does not equate" to the small amount of alcohol she has actually drunk. It was also announced that the episode would feature a QR code that would allow viewers to view an exclusive five part BBC mini-series, Spiked, that would show the incident happening from the viewpoints of Anna and her friends, with viewers choosing which platform to watch from (TikTok, Facebook and Instagram). It was the first time that EastEnders had done this, and it was reported that the series would show the effects the spiking has on Anna in addition to the internal warning signs of being spiked. The BBC Controller of Youth Audience Fiona Campbell said that that QR code in the episode would allow the storyline to reach a wider audience, including "those most affected by spiking", which she called a plot that has "great public relevance". She added, "EastEnders is one of the BBC's highest performing shows for young audiences and driving its awareness on short form video platforms where these audiences find much of their daily content diet is a priority for us". Prior to the episode's broadcast, British government ministers had been calling for drink and needle spiking to be made a special criminal offence amid the "growing epidemic around drink spiking".

"With incidents of spiking rising at alarming rates across the UK in recent years, we chose to explore this issue with Anna Knight who represents the demographic most affected by spiking. It was imperative for us to work alongside organisations to accurately present, and sensitively portray this storyline, and Molly's performance has thoughtfully demonstrated the dangerous realities of spiking as we look to raise awareness of the warning signs and symptoms to look out for after an individual has been spiked."

— EastEnders executive producer Chris Clenshaw on the spiking storyline (2024)

EastEnders worked with the charities Stamp Out Spiking and WithYou, in addition to experts in the matter, to make sure that the storyline was portrayed in a sensitive and accurate way. Dawn Dines, CEO and Founder of Stamp Out Spiking, praised the plot and believed that it would spark conversations to protect people from being targeted, adding, "Education is key to preventing these incidents. Stamp Out Spiking are delighted to have taken part in bringing the essential storyline to the screen". Lead Clinical Pharmacist at WithYou Abie Wilson thanked the soap for working with them on the "important" storyline and urged anyone affected to access support. She also noted how Anna was brought to safety by her friends, explaining, "we always advise being with people you trust and who will look out for you when partying". Further details about the storyline were released later that month, including its aftermath. It was revealed that Anna would not want to report the matter to the police and that her boyfriend, Bobby Beale (Clay Milner Russell), would try to help her but "accidentally puts his foot in", leading to Freddie Slater (Bobby Brazier) trying to help the two. Anna later decides to tell her father, George Knight (Colin Salmon), what has happened.

=== Storyline development ===
23-year-old Rainford was pleased when she was told about the storyline as she knew many people that had been spiked, including her friends, adding, "This happens to people my age [...] I shouldn't feel lucky that it hasn't happened to me". She was also glad that she could warn viewers about the dangers of spiking. Rainford explained that she knew many people who had been in Anna's position and thought it was scary for young people, particularly women, adding, "We should never feel like we can't go and have fun on a night out". Rainford said that being part of the storyline was really insightful for her and believed that it was important as it showed viewers what to look out for if the situation occurs as it could "happen to anyone". Regarding the digital series, Rainford believed that it was "really clever" to show the events from different characters' as it highlighted how quickly the spiking changes the events of the night, and she noted how people usually take pictures and videos during nights out.

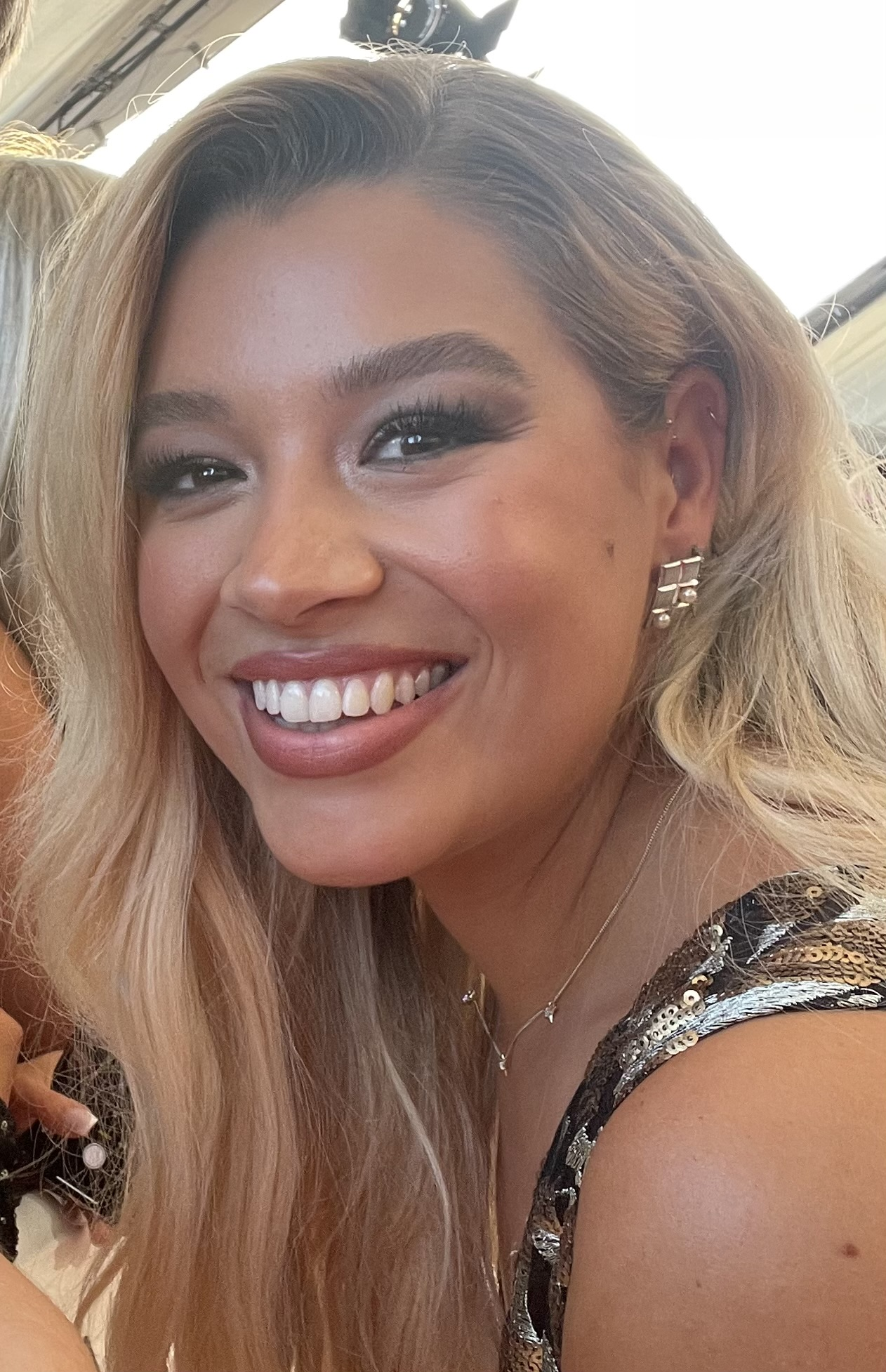
Molly Rainford (pictured) portrays Anna Knight, who is spiked in the episode

In an interview with Inside Soap, Rainford explained that during the night out, Anna feels safe as she is with people she knows but she is confused as she has suddenly gone from sober to really drunk, and she is also scared as she becomes very confused by her surroundings. Revealing the aftermath, the actress explained that Anna would wake up in hospital and feels scared but also blames herself for being spiked, which Rainford called a "very common misconception"; she also added that Anna is scared of going out again, which Rainford believed nobody should feel like. Anna is initially wary about telling her father as she does not want to burden him as he has been through a lot. The episode also sees Anna questioned over her relationship with Bobby by her sister, Gina Knight (Francesca Henry); Rainford explained that Anna is frustrated that she keeps having to justify her relationship despite it being proved that Bobby is a "good guy". Rainford also explained that Anna is a bit worried that Bobby is not responding to her attempts to invite him on her night out, but she added that Anna likely thinks that Bobby is just trying to be "more cool about everything" by not responding. Rainford added that an unwell and stressed Anna later gets stressed with Bobby, who wants to "make sense" of the situation, and she turns to Freddie instead as she wants someone to listen to her and not question how she feels.

The episode also features the continuation of Jane Beale's (Laurie Brett) return guest stint, who had returned at the end of the previous episode and had not been seen on the soap since leaving in 2017. Jane was revealed to be the person that Ian Beale (Adam Woodyatt) had been secretly meeting with. Brett believed that her surprise return was a shock to viewers and teased that her scenes would be "intense, exciting and emotional". The actress said that she was nervous on her first day back on set and was unsure if she knew how to play Jane again, but her worries "melted away" when she saw cast and crew members that she knew from her previous stints that were welcoming towards her. EastEnders executive producer Chris Clenshaw had told Brett about Jane's return storyline, which convinced the actress to return. She was excited to work with Woodyatt and Thomas Law (Peter Beale) again, and noted that Law was now taller than her as she had worked with him when he was a child. Brett had previously worked in Woodyatt in a play after her EastEnders departure and said that she finds working him easy as they have a "have a sixth sense of where we are going with our scenes". Brett was also excited to work with Clay Milner Russell, who portrays Jane's adoptive son, Bobby Beale. She explained that when Jane sees Bobby, it is "almost like an out-of-body experience for her", adding, "The whole world stops, and all she can see is him. Her heart is exploding with love, and everything else fades to black". Brett called it a "beautiful" scene and believed that some of the scenes in the episode would make people cry, adding, "No matter what Bobby has done to Jane in the past, a mother will always forgive".

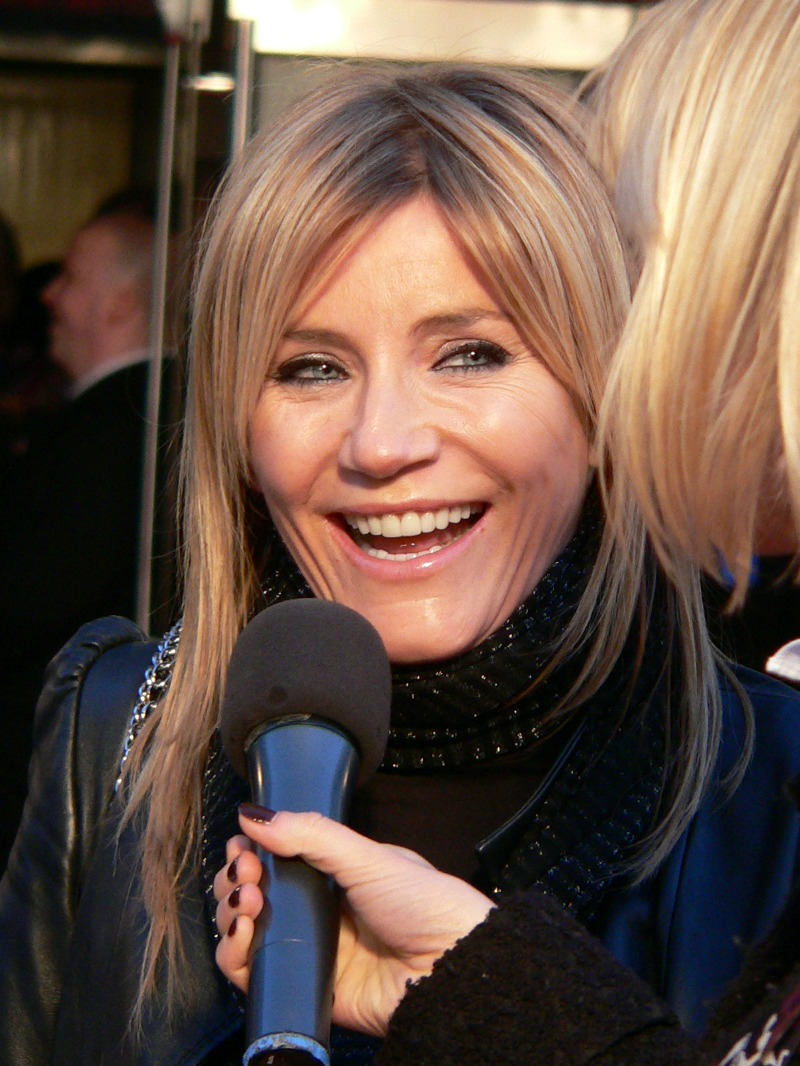
Laurie Brett enjoyed working with Michelle Collins (pictured)

The episode includes a showdown between Ian's ex-wives Jane and Cindy Beale (Michelle Collins), which was teased beforehand in spoilers; it was the first time that the two characters had been together in the soap and interacted. The episode also revisited Jane's 2014 cover-up of Bobby's killing of Cindy and Ian's daughter Lucy Beale (Hetti Bywater). Brett believed that what Jane did that night was "unfathomable" but acknowledged that she been a great mother to Cindy's children before that. The actress believed that there is a lot of drama between Cindy and Jane but added, "they are both mothers - funnily enough, of the same children - and most mothers would do anything for their kids". Brett explained that Cindy is angry at Jane, but Cindy is also lashing out as she feels guilty that she was not there; Brett added that both characters know they have both made mistakes and thus it is "complex". The actress also added, "Jane is sideswiped by Cindy, but she's also a bit indignant, thinking, 'What are you doing in my house?' Seeing Cindy is almost like seeing a ghost for Jane. Jane's head is spinning, which is only natural, given how bizarre this situation is." Brett was excited to work with Collins and they enjoyed working together as they are similar offscreen, with Brett adding, "Michelle is nothing like Cindy, and I'm nothing like Jane, but we are very similar creatures to each other in many different respects", and revealed that the pair kept "getting the giggles". Brett compared the "old school" dynamic between Cindy and Jane to former EastEnders characters Peggy Mitchell (Barbara Windsor) and Pat Butcher (Pam St Clement). The end of the episode sees Ian threaten to end his relationship to Cindy.

== Broadcast ==
The episode aired on 16 July 2024. It was released on BBC iPlayer earlier in the day. The episode was also set in the countryside.

== Reception ==
Erin Zammitt from Digital Spy called the spiking storyline "important". Helen Daly from Radio Times called it a "harrowing" and "one-of-a-kind" story. Prior to the episode's release, The Independent released an article on the warning signs to look for if someone has been spiked and what to do in those situations.

Lewis Knight from Radio Times called the confrontation between Jane and Cindy "explosive" and "vicious" and the situation "tense"; he also found it odd when Cindy later tried to comfort Jane. He also questioned whether it was the end for Ian and Cindy and whether Bobby would be able to let Jane back into his life. Knight's colleague, Laura Denby, believed that Cindy and Jane would have some "harsh words" for each other and called their showdown "fireworks" and the "biggest drama to come". Denby had also called Jane's return and her coming face-to-face with Cindy in the previous episode "one iconic cliffhanger". Kerry Barrett from What to Watch believed that some viewers would be surprised by the "real showdown" of the episode, which included Bobby. Barrett called the confrontation between Cindy and Jane "the confrontation we've all been waiting" and that EastEnders viewers had thought that it would be big, and Barrett opined that it "definitely" did not disappoint, though she also noted that the two women appeared to "bury the hatchet" by the end of the episode. Barrett also called the dinner "awkward" and wondered whether Bobby and Jane would be able to rebuild their relationship.

Maisie Spackman from Metro was surprised that Bobby agreed with Cindy for not understanding why Jane covered up his killing of Lucy and believed that it was unfortunate that Cindy and Jane's conversation ended in a row; she also called Ian's threat to end his relationship to Cindy a "shocking" and "unexpected move" and questioned whether it was the end for their relationship. Laura-Jayne Tyler from Inside Soap praised the soap for "milking the most from every single second" of Jane's return, and said that she was "still hungry for me"; she also called Cindy holding a wine glass and angrily pointing "a whole mood". Tyler's colleague, Chloe Timms, reported how viewers could not get "enough" of Jane's "shock" return and were hoping for her to return again.
