= Junior Knight =

Fictional character from EastEnders

- EastEnders character
- Portrayed by: Micah Balfour
- Duration: 2024–2025
- First appearance: Episode 6906; 13 May 2024
- Last appearance: Episode 7224; 13 November 2025
- Introduced by: Chris Clenshaw
In-universe information
- Other names: George Knight Jr.
- Occupation: Construction consultant
- Father: George Knight
- Mother: Sabrina Knight
- Stepmother: Cindy Beale; Elaine Peacock
- Half-sisters: Gina Knight; Anna Knight; Ivy Knight-Mitchell
- Wife: Monique Knight
- Sons: Xavier Knight
- Grandfathers: Henry Kofi Asare; Eddie Knight (adoptive)
- Grandmothers: Margaret Abena Asare; Gloria Knight (adoptive)
- Uncles: Kobina Asare; Kojo Asare

Junior Knight is a fictional character from the BBC soap opera EastEnders, played by Micah Balfour. Junior was introduced by executive producer Chris Clenshaw in episode 6906, broadcast on 13 May 2024, as the estranged son of established character George Knight (Colin Salmon), and half-brother of Gina Knight (Francesca Henry) and Anna Knight (Molly Rainford). His introduction billed him as a "sleazy, secretive businessman". Outside of Junior's lengthy, complicated history with his father, his storylines have prominently followed his serial cheating on his wife, Monique Knight (Busayo Ige), his affair with his former stepmother Cindy Beale (Michelle Collins), the reveal of their affair, and becoming a suspect in Cindy's subsequent attack.

== Development ==
=== Introduction, casting and characterisation ===
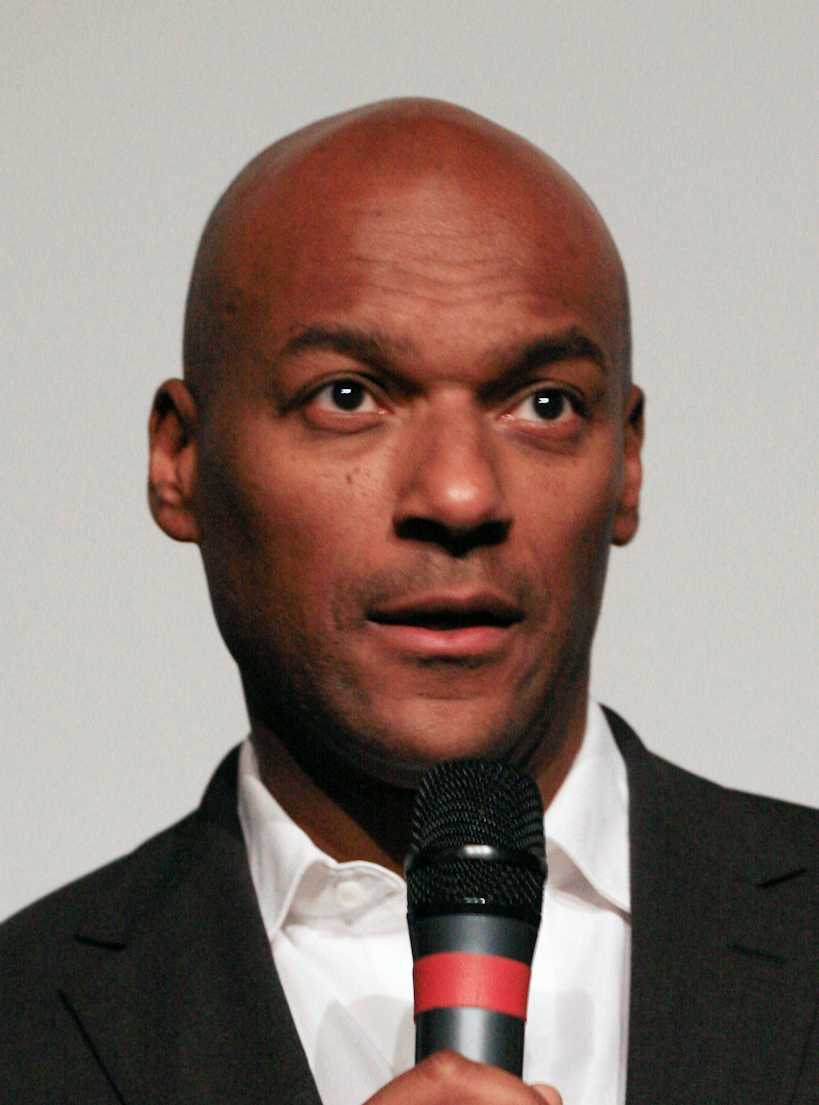
Junior was introduced as the estranged son of George Knight (Colin Salmon, pictured).

After being referenced on-screen by his family on several occasions, Junior's arrival was announced on 2 May 2024, with Emmerdale actor Micah Balfour being cast in the role. It was confirmed that the actor had already begun filming prior to the announcement. The character was announced as the estranged son of established character George Knight (Colin Salmon). Speaking on his casting, Balfour stated he was "thrilled" to join the soap, having grown up as a fan, and described walking onto the set as "surreal". Junior's reasoning for his estrangement and his upcoming arrival was initially left ambiguous, but his relationship with his father was described as "fraught" and long-running. Outside of their strained relationship, very little had been revealed about Junior prior to his introduction. The character was "set to cause some trouble" for the residents of the show's setting, Walford. Executive producer Chris Clenshaw teased: "Junior arrives in Walford following an unlikely meet with his dad and is quickly thrust into the heart of the drama. However, it will soon become apparent to viewers that there is more to Junior than meets the eye". Balfour echoed such; "Junior is an exciting character to play as he's a complex man, and he's going to cause a bit of a stir".

Junior's arrival was teased to be an "explosive reunion" for George, whom had been on a path of self-destruction leading up to his son's arrival, with George's daughter Anna Knight (Molly Rainford) being the one to contact Junior. Junior was deemed "a major new face" and further teasers revealed he would have a one night stand with Bianca Jackson (Patsy Palmer) early into his stint. The character made his first appearance in episode 6906, broadcast on 13 May 2024. Junior's introduction portrayed him as a cheater, as it was revealed that he was married to Monique Knight (Busayo Ige) with a child, Xavier Knight (Chase Dean-Williams), after he experienced a "difficult reunion" with George and slept with Bianca, unbeknownst to the entire Knight family. It was later announced that Monique and Xavier would briefly join the show as part of Junior's initial development. Once his night with Bianca is revealed, Monique leaves him and takes Xavier, as it transpires that he had been unfaithful to her multiple times before.

=== Affair with Cindy Beale ===
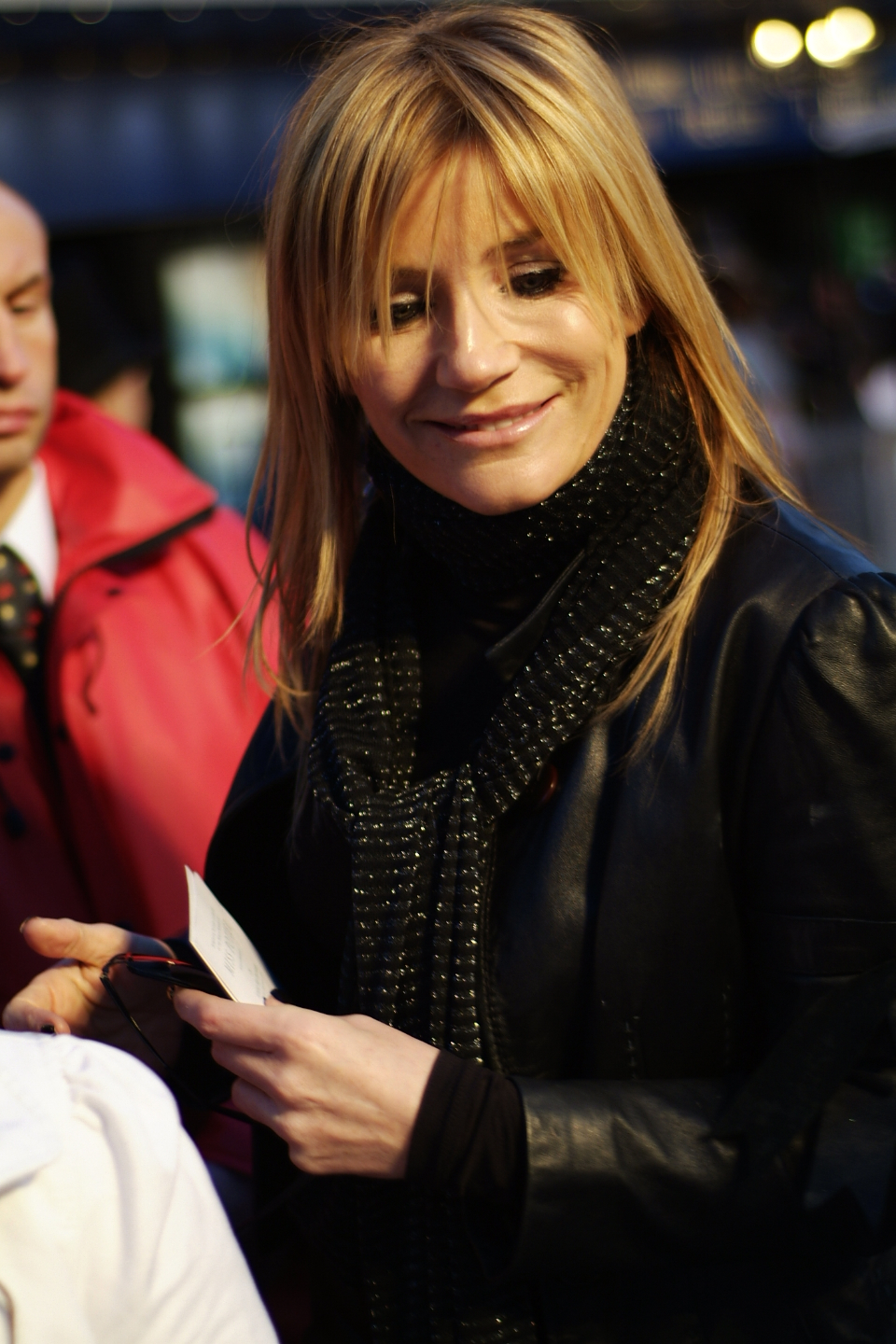
Following his arrival, Junior begins an affair with his former stepmother Cindy Beale (Michelle Collins, pictured).

After witnessing George have an intimate moment his ex-wife Cindy Beale (Michelle Collins), despite being engaged to Elaine Peacock (Harriet Thorpe), Junior confronted Cindy before sharing a kiss with her, Despite Cindy being his former stepmother, the two started an affair, with Cindy cheating behind the back of her fiancé, Ian Beale (Adam Woodyatt). In July 2024, it was announced that their affair would risk exposure. In a Radio Times interview, Balfour said Junior was "excited" by the affair, and that Junior's attraction to Cindy was rooted in her marriage to Ian making her "unattainable" and how "he's always at arm's length" from her as a result. The actor added that Junior enjoyed being deceitful: "He likes the clandestine nature of their relationship and enjoys the thrill of potentially being caught doing something he's not meant to be doing." Acknowledging Junior's recent decision to offer Cindy's son Peter Beale (Thomas Law) a job, Balfour explained that Junior was aware that Cindy's behaviour was becoming suspicious to her loved ones, so attempted to pacify Peter by ensuring he wasn't around Cindy as often. He added that this had the added benefit of Junior being able to keep Peter busy, preventing Peter from discovering the affair. The actor added that when Junior offered Peter the job, he knew Cindy wouldn't be happy. Balfour noted that Junior enjoyed "winding Cindy up and keeping her on her toes", so didn't care when Cindy asked Junior to rescind the job offer to Peter.

Balfour explained that Junior enjoyed his "fiery and passionate" interactions with Cindy. When asked if Junior had any reservations about sleeping with his former stepmother, Balfour responded that Junior's original decision to do so was only out of resentment for George as a way to spite him, but since then Junior had developed genuine feelings for Cindy, and that Junior did not care about how it would affect his family as Junior believes "what people don't know can't hurt them". Balfour predicted that the affair would worsen Junior's relationship with George. The affair continued in secret until it was announced on 25 November 2024 that the affair would be revealed during the show's upcoming Christmas episodes. The affair was teased to be "spectacularly exposed" and the fallout was set to depict that "all hell will break loose among the Beale and Knight families".

The affair was unveiled to a crowded The Queen Victoria pub in episode 7037 by Lauren Branning (Jacqueline Jossa), who did so as a way of getting revenge on Cindy for getting Lauren addicted to painkillers while pregnant, along with the fact that Cindy had slept with Junior as a substitute for George. The show confirmed in a Behind the Scenes video that the scene where the affair was revealed referenced both the "Sharongate" storyline, with the recording being played in a crowded pub. Following the affair reveal, Cindy was hit and knocked unconscious by an unseen figure with a shovel, with Junior being listed as an official suspect for his scorn against Cindy and being shunned by the family. The show later announced that the culprit for Cindy's attack would be revealed on the show's 40th anniversary.

=== Departure ===
On 28 October 2025, it was announced Balfour had been let go from the role. A spokesperson later revealed Junior would exit later that same year.

== Storylines ==
After a self-destructing George Knight (Colin Salmon) participates in underground boxing, despite being aware it could kill him as a result of CTE, his opponent is revealed to be his son Junior, causing George to opt out of the fight. Junior reveals he arrived due to his half-sister Anna Knight (Molly Rainford) contacting him as a last-ditch effort to stop their father's downward spiral. Despite this, Junior remains cold towards George and tells him he only arrived for the sake of his half-sisters Anna and Gina Knight (Francesca Henry). Junior sleeps with Bianca Jackson (Patsy Palmer), despite being married to Monique Knight (Busayo Ige). He soon introduces Monique and their son Xavier (Chase Dean-Williams) to the family and they bond. Junior and Monique's bliss is short-lived when Monique discovers that he has slept with Bianca, and she returns to Dubai with Xavier, having given Junior several chances to stop cheating in the past.

Junior develops a relationship with his family and allows Gina to stay with him at the Brewery Apartments. With Monique gone, Junior grows closer to his former stepmother Cindy Beale (Michelle Collins) and they begin a sexual affair, behind the back of her husband Ian Beale (Adam Woodyatt). Junior and Cindy's affair continues despite his friendship with her son Peter (Thomas Law), and Cindy's ex-fling and Bianca's father, David Wicks (Michael French), finding out about their affair. Soon Junior's uncle Kojo Asare (Dayo Koleosho) catches Junior and Cindy kissing behind The Queen Vic. As he prepares to tell George, he accidentally falls and becomes comatose. When he wakes up, Cindy threatens him into keeping quiet about the affair, which Junior is repulsed by upon learning. Unbeknownst to Cindy and Junior, Cindy's confession to David about her affair with Junior was accidentally taped by Anna and Freddie Slater (Bobby Brazier) during their birdwatching recording. Junior's stepmother Elaine Knight (Harriet Thorpe) hears the recording which Lauren Branning (Jacqueline Jossa) finds and discovers their affair. Her rivalry with Cindy prompts her to expose it on Christmas Day to a packed pub, revealing to Junior that Cindy was sleeping with him as a substitute for George. Cindy is later attacked in the middle of the square, with Junior being pinned as a prime suspect in the ensuing case. Desperate to prove his innocence, Junior exposes Gina for throwing a brick through Cindy's window and steals the shovel used to attack Cindy from the Queen Vic to show Cindy that she can trust him. When Cindy is evicted by Ian after attempting to prove Kathy Cotton (Gillian Taylforth) attacked her, Junior allows her to move in with him; he later gives Cindy a loan to pay Priya Nandra-Hart (Sophie Khan Levy) to find incriminating evidence on Ian. Unbeknownst to Junior, Cindy inadvertently causes an explosion at The Queen Vic after discovering Kathy attacked her, which kills Martin Fowler (James Bye) and Reiss Colwell (Jonny Freeman), which Ian uses to blackmail Cindy into leaving Walford. As she leaves, Junior attempts to convince her to stay to expose Ian; Cindy kisses Junior and promises that she will soon exact her revenge.

Almost a year later, Junior's uncle, Kojo Asare (Dayo Kolesho) and Harry Mitchell (Elijah Holloway) get caught up in a drug trafficking ring, orchestrated by Ravi Gulati (Aaron Thiara) and Tobias 'Okie' Okyere (Aayan Ibikunle Shoderu). When Junior and George discover this, they are horrified and are concerned for Kojo's safety. Meanwhile, Junior finds out that Monique is dating someone and Xavier now regards her new partner as his father. Junior gets a job offer in Dubai, and George encourages him to go to rebuild his relationship with Xavier. At first, Junior is hesitant as he wants to ensure Kojo's wellbeing, but eventually, he decides to move to Dubai. Before leaving, George apologises for not being a good father to Junior. Junior and Cindy also share a heartfelt farewell. After saying goodbye to his family in Walford, Junior leaves.

== Reception ==
In April 2024, prior to the character's announcement, his arrival was predicted by Grace Morris of What's on TV, who showed viewers correctly forecasting it via Twitter. Following Junior's arrival, Laura Denby of Radio Times commented that he had "turned up in the most unexpected way", adding that his first line, 'Hello dad', was like a "classic EastEnders entrance". Following the beginning of Junior and Cindy's affair, Denby called Junior "shameless" and the affair a "scandalous development". Erin Zammitt of Digital Spy called Junior and Cindy's first kiss "unexpected" and a "shock passion". After Junior and Cindy's "steamy" kiss aired, Kerry Barrett of What's on TV wrote: "Junior's only been in Albert Square for five minutes but he's already fallen into bed with Bianca Jackson, and - more shockingly - this week he seduced his former stepmum Cindy Beale". In the days following the kiss, Denby commented that viewers and fans were "still recovering". In August 2024, Helen Daly of Radio Times commented that Junior had "certainly made an impact since he landed in EastEnders", expressing surprise about Junior turning a "powerful Cindy into putty" and adding that Junior had been "playing with fire" by doing so. The affair was described as "torrid" by Erin Zammitt of Digital Spy. Junior was called a "womaniser" and a "serial cheater" by Rachel Lucas of What's on TV. Lewis Knight of Radio Times wrote that Junior and Cindy's affair was "illicit".
