= Elaine Peacock =

Fictional character from EastEnders

- EastEnders character
- Harriet Thorpe as Elaine Peacock (2023)
- Portrayed by: Maria Friedman (2014–2017); Harriet Thorpe (2023–present)
- Duration: 2014–2017, 2023–present
- First appearance: Episode 4942; 14 October 2014
- Created by: Dominic Treadwell-Collins
- Introduced by: Dominic Treadwell-Collins (2014); Sean O'Connor (2017); Chris Clenshaw (2023)
- Spin-off appearances: Tracey: A Day in the Life (2024)
In-universe information
- Other names: Elaine Alexandra Peacock; Elaine Knight
- Occupation: Pub landlady; Barmaid; Bar manager; Businesswoman; B&B owner
- Mother: Rose
- Husband: John Peacock (backstory); George Knight (2024–2025)
- Daughters: Linda Carter
- Stepsons: Junior Knight
- Stepdaughters: Gina Knight; Anna Knight
- Grandsons: Lee Carter; Johnny Carter; Ollie Carter
- Granddaughters: Nancy Carter; Annie Carter

Elaine Peacock (also Knight) is a fictional character from the BBC soap opera EastEnders. Introduced as the mother of established character Linda Carter (Kellie Bright), Elaine was portrayed by Maria Friedman from October 2014 until June 2017 as a recurring character before being recast to Harriet Thorpe from May 2023 onwards as a series regular, taking over the Queen Victoria public house as landlady alongside Linda, following on from the disappearance of Linda's ex-husband, Mick Carter (Danny Dyer). Elaine's storylines in her first stint saw the character arrive to comfort Linda following her rape by Dean Wicks (Matt Di Angelo), pursuing a relationship with toyboy Jason Adams (Scott Neal), and feuding with Babe Smith (Annette Badland).

In her second stint, Elaine's storylines include taking over The Queen Vic as landlady alongside new partner George Knight (Colin Salmon) and his daughters Gina (Francesca Henry) and Anna Knight (Molly Rainford), a feud with George's ex-wife Cindy Beale (Michelle Collins) and subsequently falling out with George after he and Cindy kiss twice, supporting Yolande Trueman (Angela Wynter) after her sexual assault ordeal by Pastor Clayton (Howard Saddler), caring for George's brother Kojo Asare (Dayo Koleosho), who decides to live with her and George, coming to terms with Linda murdering Keanu Taylor (Danny Walters) as part of "The Six" storyline, revealing to Linda that her father was gay which they hid from her for years, dealing with Linda's alcohol relapse, being a suspect in the "Who Attacked Cindy?" storyline for the show's 40th anniversary, cheating on George after she feels unwanted by him, having a health scare which prompts her to sell The Queen Vic, becoming co-manager of The Prince Albert gay bar with Cindy after Cindy struggles to run it alone, and opening up a boutique hotel on the Square.

Elaine is described as being larger than life, glamorous, and loves to be the centre of attention, and has a 'fraught' relationship with her daughter due to their similar personalities.

== Development ==
Friedman was cast in the role of Elaine on 18 September 2014. Speaking about the development and casting of Elaine, executive producer Dominic Treadwell-Collins said that "ever since Elaine became the voice on the end of the Queen Vic phone, we have been waiting to see just what kind of woman made Linda Carter."

Friedman had initially signed up for a guest stint, with Elaine appearing from October to December 2014. Speaking about her casting, Friedman said of Elaine that she is "tough, warm and capable – but also proud and more than a little vain, bringing with her a whole new dynamic when she arrives in Walford to sort out her daughter. Maria Friedman is a West End legend and we are all very excited to have someone of her pedigree playing Elaine Peacock."

The character returned for another guest stint from February to March 2015 and returned for three months from September 2015 to January 2016. She returned for a single episode in March 2016. The character made an unannounced one–off return on 30 June 2017.

=== Reintroduction ===
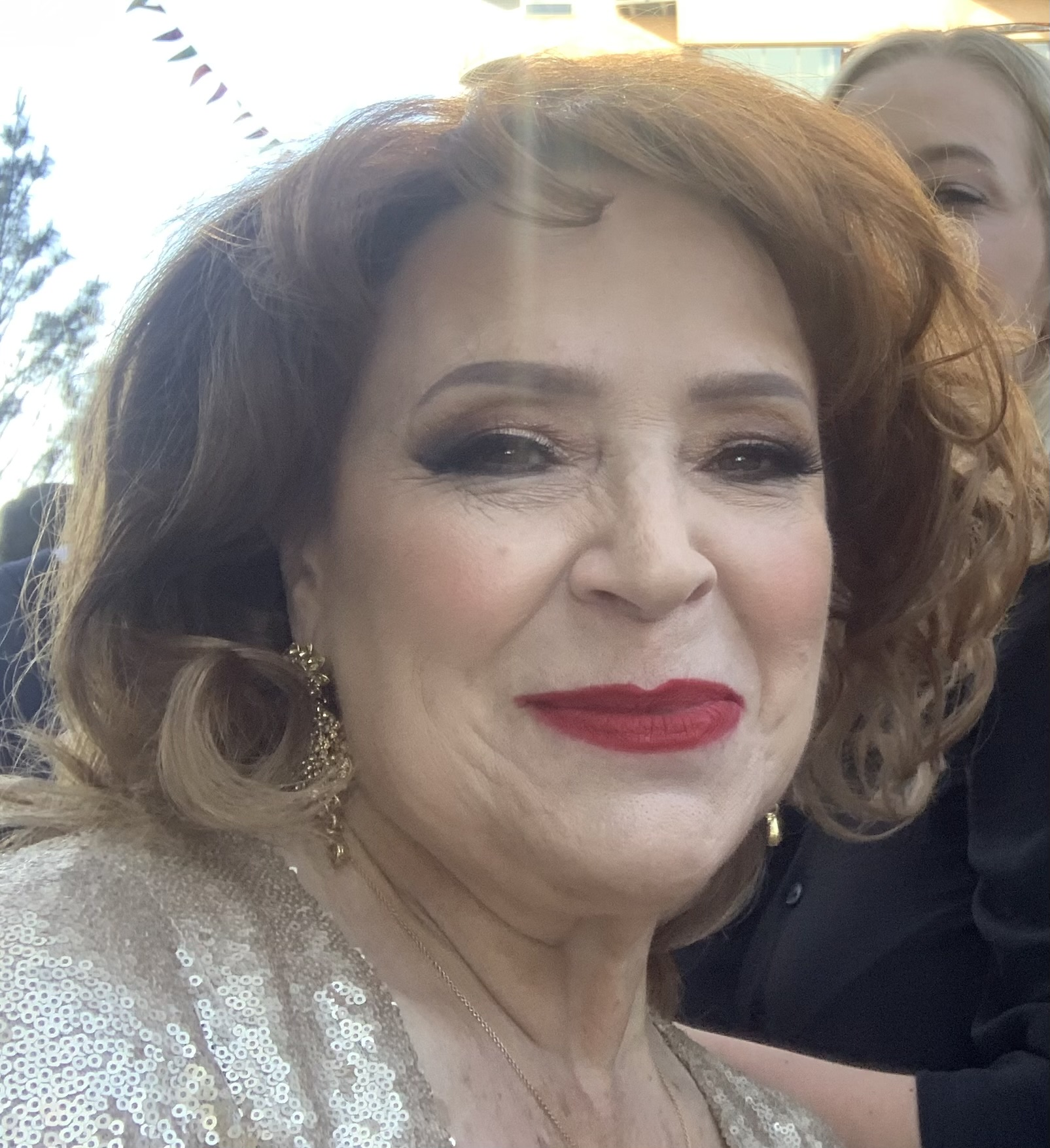
Harriet Thorpe took over the role of Elaine in 2023.

On 28 March 2023, EastEnders announced that Harriet Thorpe had been recast as Elaine, returning to the show in a central role alongside her new partner, George Knight, and his daughters Gina (Francesca Henry) and Anna (Molly Rainford). Thorpe's casting brought excitement to the upcoming storyline, with her character Elaine positioned as a key figure in the Knight family dynamic. Elaine's role as the matriarch was particularly notable, as she became both a supportive partner to George and a protective mother to her daughter, Linda.

Executive producer Chris Clenshaw described the creation of the Knight family, which began in early 2023, and highlighted how important Elaine's character was in grounding the family's arrival in Walford. Thorpe described her casting as a "dream come true" and described Elaine as "funny but fearless". Thorpe added that in the role, she wanted to make Elaine a character representing the over-60s demographic. Elaine returned on 10 May 2023, with Clenshaw praising Thorpe's portrayal, noting that the character had already exceeded expectations by the time her family made their full debut on 1 June 2023, in the show's 6708th episode.

The strength of Elaine's character and Thorpe's performance was a central point in establishing the Knight family's presence in EastEnders, as the storyline unfolded throughout the summer.

In April 2024, EastEnders announced a sexual assault storyline surrounding Yolande Trueman (Angela Wynter), where she is sexually assaulted by Pastor Gideon Clayton. Elaine plays a significant role in the storyline, becoming a vital source of support for Yolande, who confides in her following the traumatic event. Thorpe's portrayal of Elaine highlights her character's empathetic and nurturing qualities, providing Yolande with a safe space to process her ordeal. Elaine's involvement in this sensitive storyline is crucial, as she helps Yolande navigate the complex emotions following the assault and offers her emotional refuge. Thorpe's performance adds depth to Elaine's character, reinforcing her as a pivotal figure in Yolande's journey towards healing. The storyline, crafted in collaboration with End Violence Against Women Coalition and Hourglass, aimed to raise awareness about the impact of sexual abuse, particularly for older women, and Thorpe's involvement further emphasises the importance of creating a dialogue around this issue. After the episode that featured the sexual assault aired, Thorpe commented on how "honoured" she was to be part of the storyline.

=== Relationships ===
==== Linda Carter ====
Elaine's relationship with her daughter, Linda Carter, has been portrayed as complex and, at times, strained. After Linda's husband, Mick Carter, disappeared and was presumed dead, Elaine returned to support her, becoming a partner in running The Queen Vic. However, tensions surfaced when Linda confided in Elaine about Keanu's murder and the events of Christmas night, leaving Elaine shocked and emotionally distant. Their relationship has been characterised by moments of both conflict and reconciliation, with Elaine's tough love often clashing with Linda's emotional vulnerability. Critics noted this dynamic, with some viewers feeling that Elaine's approach to Linda's struggles was sometimes unsupportive.

==== George Knight ====
Discussing Elaine's relationship with George, Colin Salmon highlighted how Elaine plays a pivotal role in their dynamic. He described them as a happy couple, with Elaine giving George the space to make himself "vulnerable" to her. Salmon noted that Elaine "instils confidence" in George, recognising his softer side, and in return, George is always there to support her. The actor emphasised that Elaine and George are equals, with Elaine standing out as one of the few people unafraid to challenge George. Salmon explained, "There are a lot of people who struggle to look a man as big as George in the eye, but not Elaine." He credited Elaine for helping George grow as a person by telling him when he's wrong, a quality that strengthens their relationship.

Harriet Thorpe added that because Elaine and George began their relationship later in life, they have a deep understanding and acceptance of each other. She said, "They accept each other for who they are and know what they want, and don't want." Stefania Sarrubba of Radio Times also praised their relationship, calling it "well-balanced and healthy."

== Storylines ==
=== 2014–2017 ===
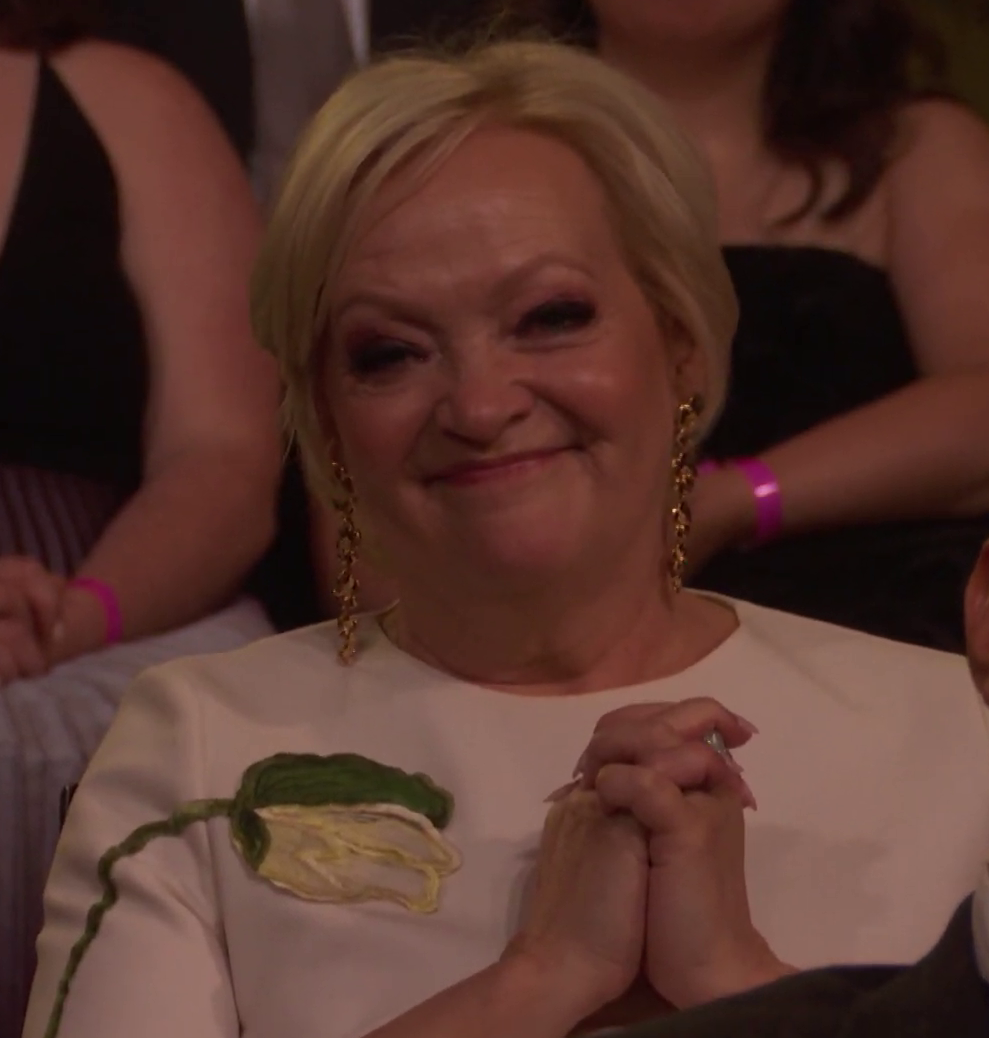
Maria Friedman originated the role of Elaine upon the character's introduction in 2014.

Mick Carter (Danny Dyer) calls her to Walford for the first time in October 2014 when Linda starts acting strangely, refusing to be intimate with him and complaining of migraines. Elaine convinces Linda to dress up and work the bar during a musical bingo night run by her granddaughter Nancy Carter (Maddy Hill), and later becomes suspicious when she notices tension between her daughter and Dean Wicks (Matt Di Angelo). She accuses Linda of having an affair with him, revealing that she cheated on Linda's deceased father John before his death. Linda denies this passionately and Elaine believes her, but still sensing something is wrong, warns Dean to stay away from Linda. She returns to Walford in December and finds out that Dean raped Linda. Elaine then allows Mick and Linda to stay with her for a while to escape Albert Square. Elaine returns for an event at The Queen Vic, and then again when Linda has her five-month scan. After the scan, she breaks down to Elaine, revealing her fears that the baby is Dean's, not Mick's. It is later revealed that after Linda gives birth prematurely to Ollie Carter (Jack Tilley), he is Mick's son.

One year after Linda's rape, Mick arranges for Elaine to take her on holiday. They return early, and Elaine brings with her new toyboy fiancé, Jason Adams (Scott Neal) with her. The Carters are at first cautious of Jason, particularly Linda, which frustrates Elaine. Mick and Linda hear somebody downstairs, and when they investigate, they find Jason naked with Mick's great-aunt, Babe Smith (Annette Badland). Mick and Linda force Babe to get Jason to leave, without Elaine knowing. However, when Elaine teases Babe as to how she has never had a man in her life, Babe claims that she had sex with Jason. Elaine does not believe her and accuses her of trying to cause trouble for her and Jason. However, later that day, Babe plays a recording on her mobile phone to Elaine, the Carters and the pub's customers of Jason persuading her to help him rob the pub, revealing their one-night stand in the process. Elaine is furious and slaps Babe for humiliating her and for cheating with her fiancé, before Mick orders Jason to leave. Linda then persuades Elaine to listen to Babe's version of events, which reveal that she did not have sex with Jason, but they came close. Elaine manages to forgive Babe, but when Jason arrives for his belongings, she, Babe and Linda are all stunned at how remorseless he is for hurting the family. Linda throws Jason out.

Elaine is thrilled when Linda and Mick plan to marry, but causes tension when she tries to take over the planning. Mick is able to get her involved in a nativity play, so she does not have time to plan the wedding. Once the couple marry, Elaine decides to return to Watford. She returns when Ollie is injured and may have brain damage. Linda misses a health worker's visit, so Elaine takes charge.

On Christmas Eve 2016, Linda receives a phonecall from a hospital in Spain informing her that Elaine has suffered a severe stroke and it is unknown whether she will recover. Linda decides she has to leave Walford with her son Johnny Carter (Ted Reilly) to be with and support her mother through her illness. After six months away caring for Elaine, Linda returns to Walford for her 40th birthday party. However, she returns to Watford the same evening. It is revealed that Elaine has recovered and that her stroke was not as severe as first made out, and that she and Linda are hiding a secret. Linda's secret is later revealed to be that she was diagnosed with cervical cancer while caring for Elaine. In September 2021, Linda leaves Walford with Ollie and her newborn daughter Annie, to stay with Elaine.

=== 2023–present ===
After Mick disappears at sea and is presumed dead, his new widow Janine Carter (Charlie Brooks) decides to sell his half of The Queen Vic after getting arrested for perverting the court of justice. Elaine buys the other half to run it with Linda. Elaine quickly makes her presence felt and clashes with Nish Panesar (Navin Chowdhry) and his wife Suki (Balvinder Sopal), who wanted to buy the pub, and ends up barring the both of them, so Nish recruits his son Vinny (Shiv Jalota) to break in to The Queen Vic and vandalise it in revenge. The following month, Elaine's partner George Knight (Colin Salmon) arrives from Marbella and moves into The Queen Vic with his two daughters Gina (Francesca Henry) and Anna (Molly Rainford), and their pet Chihuahua, Tyson, much to the dismay of Linda. George confronts Nish after discovering that he orchestrated the break-in and warns him off. Elaine fires Alfie Moon (Shane Richie) from The Queen Vic shortly after George's arrival, which infuriates Linda. Linda clashes with George, as Linda believes that George intends to fleece Elaine. He remains secretive about his ex-wife, prompting Linda to seek Phil's help to investigate her. George's ex-wife Rose is revealed to be Cindy Beale (Michelle Collins). Elaine and Cindy begin a feud, and Elaine remains suspicious of Cindy. Elaine's suspicions are confirmed when Gina catches Cindy kissing George. After Pastor Gideon Clayton (Howard Saddler) sexually assaults her friend Yolande Trueman (Angela Wynter), Yolande confides in Elaine, who persuades her to report the sexual assault, which she initially declines. When Yolande reports the assault, she asks Elaine for support during the examination process.

When George's adoptive father Eddie Knight (Christopher Fairbank) is revealed to have murdered his biological father in a racially aggravated attack, Elaine supports George and urges him to forgive his adoptive mother Gloria (Elizabeth Counsell) after she hid information about his birth parents. Gloria later dies from a heart attack shortly after George forgives her. After this, George's behaviour spirals out of control and he starts to participate in unlicensed boxing which injuries and nearly kills him. Elaine becomes jealous when George constantly turns to Cindy, and she is heartbroken when she finds out that they have kissed. Elaine ends her relationship with George but changes her mind and gradually forgives him. Before getting back together with George, Elaine confronts Cindy asks her if she wants George or her current partner, Ian Beale (Adam Woodyatt). Cindy decides to stay with Ian. Elaine continues to struggle with Linda following her alcohol relapse, in the months after she murdered Keanu Taylor (Danny Walters) on Christmas Day (see "The Six"). Elaine, unaware of what happened at Christmas, calls Johnny (now played by Charlie Suff) to help her with Linda. George's biological brothers, Kobina (Jonathon Nyati) and Kojo Asare (Dayo Koleosho) arrive in Walford to seek answers about their father's death. Elaine and George agree to look after Kojo after Kobina admits he is struggling to care for Kojo as he has autism. They initially struggle with Kojo but he is comforted by a tape of his and George's late mother singing. When Ollie accidentally breaks the tape, Elaine goes to repair the tape and has it digitised.

During Dean's trial, Elaine supports Linda in court when she gives a witness statement under false pretences. Linda later tells her mother about the events of Christmas, which shocks Elaine and she distances herself, so a deeply hurt Linda lashes out at Elaine for not supporting her since her return. Elaine and Linda have a heart-to-heart and she reassures her of her unwavering support.

After Pastor Clayton takes his own life following a heated confrontation with Yolande, it comes to light that more victims had already come forward with accusations against him. The growing revelations weigh heavily on Yolande, leaving her grappling with guilt over his death. Once again, she turns to Elaine, who reassures her that she was not responsible for Clayton's suicide. Elaine comforts Yolande, reminding her that the blame lies solely with Clayton and not with her or the other victims.

In November 2024, Elaine reveals to Linda that her father John, was gay and had a relationship behind her back, after John's former partner, Drew Peacock (Paul Clayton) is hired as a drag queen to perform at Elaine's hen night before her wedding to George. Elaine explained to Linda that she walked in on John and Drew sleeping together and decided to keep it secret for the sake of their family. Linda is distraught at this revelation and insults Elaine who slaps her in return. Elaine meets with Drew to discuss both of their relationships with John, both make peace as Drew leaves Walford. The following week, Elaine asks Cindy to honey trap George ahead of their wedding to make sure that their love is genuine after the tension that was created since Cindy's return. Cindy does this and George cements his love for Elaine but finds out she was behind the honey trap, this prompts George to call the wedding off in anger. Elaine apologies to George and decides to leave Walford for a break, but after Gina and Anna remind George what he would be losing – and that Elaine forgave him for worse, George goes after Elaine just as she leaves and changes his mind on getting married and they wed on the same day, with Elaine now officially becoming a member of the Knight family. Elaine subsequently supports George and the rest of her new family after Kojo falls off a stairwell in an accident witnessed by Cindy and Lauren Branning (Jacqueline Jossa) shortly after Kojo sees Cindy and George's son, Junior Knight (Micah Balfour) kissing outside of The Queen Vic. Elaine and George decide to go on their honeymoon after Cindy and Junior encourage them, stating that they would look after Kojo while they were away.

When Elaine returns from her honeymoon, she finds out Linda has deteriorated as a result of her alcohol relapse. She is angered by the lack of support from Linda's close friends, and scolds Bernadette (Clair Norris) for encouraging Linda to relapse. When Linda brings home a random man, Glen, to The Queen Vic, Elaine throws him out after he barges into Annie and Ollie's bedroom, believing it to be a bathroom. This prompts her to apologise to Phil, Sharon, Alfie and Johnny, who tell her that they need Linda to hit rock bottom if there is anyway to deal with the situation. Elaine gives Linda an ultimatum: go into rehab or get kicked out of The Queen Vic. When Elaine books Linda a place in rehab, Linda refuses to go and results in her falling off the bed after being pushed by Linda. After Linda blames Elaine for turning a blind-eye to Linda's drinking, Linda takes a vodka bottle and storms out of The Queen Vic. Linda experiences a vision of what would happen to her if she continues drinking which shows her imminent death, funeral and Johnny becoming an alcoholic. In the vision, Elaine is consumed by guilt after Linda's death, believing she did not do enough to help her. At the funeral, Nancy blames Elaine for Linda's struggles with alcoholism, accusing her upbringing in a pub as the cause, and slaps her in anger. Later, Nancy tells Elaine that she and Lee plan to take Ollie and Annie, leaving Elaine distraught and demanding everyone leave The Queen Vic. Snapping out of the vision, Linda pours the vodka down the drain and returns to The Queen Vic, where she tells Elaine she is ready to go to rehab. Elaine promises to support her every step of the way, and the two embrace, both in tears. Elaine later tells everyone in the Vic that Linda had gone to rehab following her worsening behaviour and asked they keep Linda in their thoughts.

Ahead of Christmas, Elaine stumbles upon a recording of Cindy confessing to David Wicks (Michael French) of her affair with Junior, captured on the same device used for the bird songs recorded by Freddie and Anna. Confronting Cindy, Elaine gives her an ultimatum, confess the affair to George and the family or risk the recording being played publicly. After George reflects on the challenges of the year, Elaine has a change of heart but insists Cindy leave Walford and sever all ties with George. When Cindy is blackmailed by Elaine, Cindy hatches a plan to get Ian to move to France with her to avoid the affair being exposed, Ian reluctantly agrees and they decide to spend their last Christmas in Walford; however, the recording is then stolen by an unknown assailant. Christmas Day arrives and Cindy asks Elaine if the recording has been found but she tells her that it has not. Cindy begs for Elaine to work together to stop the affair from being exposed, but she declines. The recording is revealed to have been retrieved by Lauren and is later played on the speakers at The Queen Vic, exposing Cindy's affair with Junior. In the aftermath of the reveal, George slips to Elaine that he still sees Cindy as his wife as they discuss the revelation of the affair. Shortly afterwards, Elaine orders George to leave The Queen Vic, leaving their newly married life in doubt. After Cindy is left for dead by an unknown assailant following the affair reveal, Elaine aids George before she heads to the hospital. The pair later reconcile.

Despite their reconciliation, Elaine remains plagued by paranoia, convinced that George does not truly love her. Tensions escalate when Junior reveals that George shared a kiss with his ex-wife, Sabrina, during a recent encounter. Hurt and disillusioned, Elaine is further unsettled after Drew Peacock returns to Walford and urges her not to settle for being someone's support act. Spurred on by Drew's words, Elaine has an affair and confesses to George the following day, leading to their split. Determined to keep The Queen Vic, Elaine draws a line in the sand, and the former couple soon go to war. The emotional strain takes its toll, and Elaine collapses and suffers a heart attack. On her return to the Square, she tells Linda that she is ready to sell The Queen Vic, admitting that being a mother means more to her than being a landlady.

Elaine initially rents The Queen Vic out to Alfie and Kat Moon (Jessie Wallace), and the two parties exchange residences rather an immediate sell but later do. Struggling to adjust without the pub, Elaine notices Cindy having difficulties managing The Prince Albert, the local gay bar. She offers her assistance, and after proving effective in the role, Cindy invites her to become co-manager - a position Elaine promptly accepts.

== Other appearances ==
Elaine appears in three of the five episodes in the Tracey: A Day in the Life miniseries, released in 2024, where in which she supports The Queen Vic barmaid, Tracey (Jane Slaughter), after she reunites with her son Tom (Oliver Llewellyn Jenkins). She comforts Tracey after she breaks down in tears and discusses her relationship to Tom. Elaine later confronts Tom when he starts shouting at Tracey after finding out that he had a new girlfriend, Molly and that they are expecting a new child. Elaine is later involved in a plan to get Tracey and Tom to reconcile on good terms and helps them stay in touch after years apart.

== Reception ==
Following Elaine's 2014 debut, Katy Brent from the Daily Mirror praised the character and said that she did not want her to leave, calling Elaine "simply ace" and a "welcome arrival" who could "rightfully become the Queen of the Vic".

For their roles as Elaine and George, Thorpe and Salmon were longlisted for "Best Partnership" at the 2024 Inside Soap Awards. Thorpe was also longlisted for "Best Comic Performance" at the 2026 Inside Soap Awards.

In March 2024, Gary Gillatt from Inside Soap praised Elaine's clothes style, writing that "Elaine has a style all her own. It feels as if she should always appear in a puff of smoke for a chorus of I Put A Spell On You". That May, Chloe Timms from the same magazine expressed fear for Elaine's relationship, writing that "[w]ith chemistry like George and Cindy's, heartbreak is coming for lovely Elaine..." Timms had previously written that Cindy and Elaine should "team up" and let go of George, though she commented that Elaine would not be "quite so friendly" when she finds out that Cindy has her "sights set on George".

Thorpe's recast of Elaine received a largely positive reception following her introduction as the new landlady of The Queen Vic. Critics and fans praised her commanding presence, with Laura Denby from Digital Spy noting that Elaine "makes her presence felt" from the moment she steps behind the bar, describing her as charming and a welcome addition to the pub's family dynamic. Denby remarked that Elaine immediately connected with the pub's regulars, taking control of the Queen Vic and promising to keep it a family establishment, which resonated with viewers. Thorpe's performance during Yolande's sexual assault storyline, alongside Wynter's, was widely praised by fans and critics who described both of their performances as "phenomenal".
