= George Knight (EastEnders) =

Fictional character from EastEnders

- EastEnders character
- Portrayed by: Colin Salmon
- Duration: 2023–present
- First appearance: Episode 6708; 1 June 2023
- Introduced by: Chris Clenshaw
In-universe information
- Other names: Kwame Asare (birth name)
- Occupation: Professional boxer Pub landlord Restaurateur
- Father: Henry Kofi Asare
- Mother: Margaret Abena Asare
- Adoptive father: Eddie Knight
- Adoptive mother: Gloria Knight
- Brothers: Kobina Asare; Kojo Asare
- Wife: Sabrina Knight (backstory); Cindy Beale (backstory); Elaine Peacock (2024–2025)
- Sons: Junior Knight
- Daughters: Gina Knight; Anna Knight; Ivy Knight-Mitchell
- Stepdaughters: Linda Carter
- Grandsons: Xavier Knight
- Uncles: Gordon (adoptive)

George Knight is a fictional character from the BBC soap opera EastEnders, played by Colin Salmon. George was introduced by executive producer, Chris Clenshaw, in episode 6,708, broadcast on 1 June 2023, as the patriarch of the Knight family. Initially billed as a charismatic ex-boxer and protective father, the character debuted alongside his girlfriend Elaine Peacock (Harriet Thorpe) and daughters Gina (Francesca Henry) and Anna Knight (Molly Rainford). His storylines in the serial have included his arrival and moving into The Queen Victoria, his proposal to Elaine, his friendship with Phil Mitchell (Steve McFadden), the reveal that his ex-wife Rose was actually Cindy Beale (Michelle Collins) in a witness protection programme, discovering he was adopted through baby farming, his ensuing identity struggles, his complicated relationship with his adoptive parents, cheating on Elaine with Cindy, being diagnosed with chronic traumatic encephalopathy (CTE) from years of professional boxing, meeting his biological brothers Kobina (Jonathan Nyati) and Kojo Asare (Dayo Koleosho), marrying Elaine, discovering Cindy's affair with his son Junior (Micah Balfour), being a suspect in the "Who Attacked Cindy?" storyline, his marriage to Elaine breaking down due to her infidelity, a relationship with Nicola Mitchell (Laura Doddington), leading to the birth of their daughter Ivy, and reluctantly taking in his racist adoptive father Eddie (Christopher Fairbank) in his dying weeks.

Throughout his stint, George has been portrayed as a good-hearted and charming man, as well as a loving father. Salmon expressed excitement about joining the soap after the news of his casting was released, as he could easily identify with George's character. As the character would be inheriting the show's central pub, The Queen Victoria, he was billed as the soap's new "lord of the manor". To ensure accuracy on George's baby farming storyline, the show worked and consulted with experts and people who lived through it. George's character received a lukewarm reception, but Salmon's performance was generally well-received. For his portrayal of George, Salmon was longlisted for "Best Serial Drama Performance" at the 29th National Television Awards, and nominated for "Best Actor" at the 2024 Radio Times Soap Awards.

== Development ==
=== Casting and creation ===
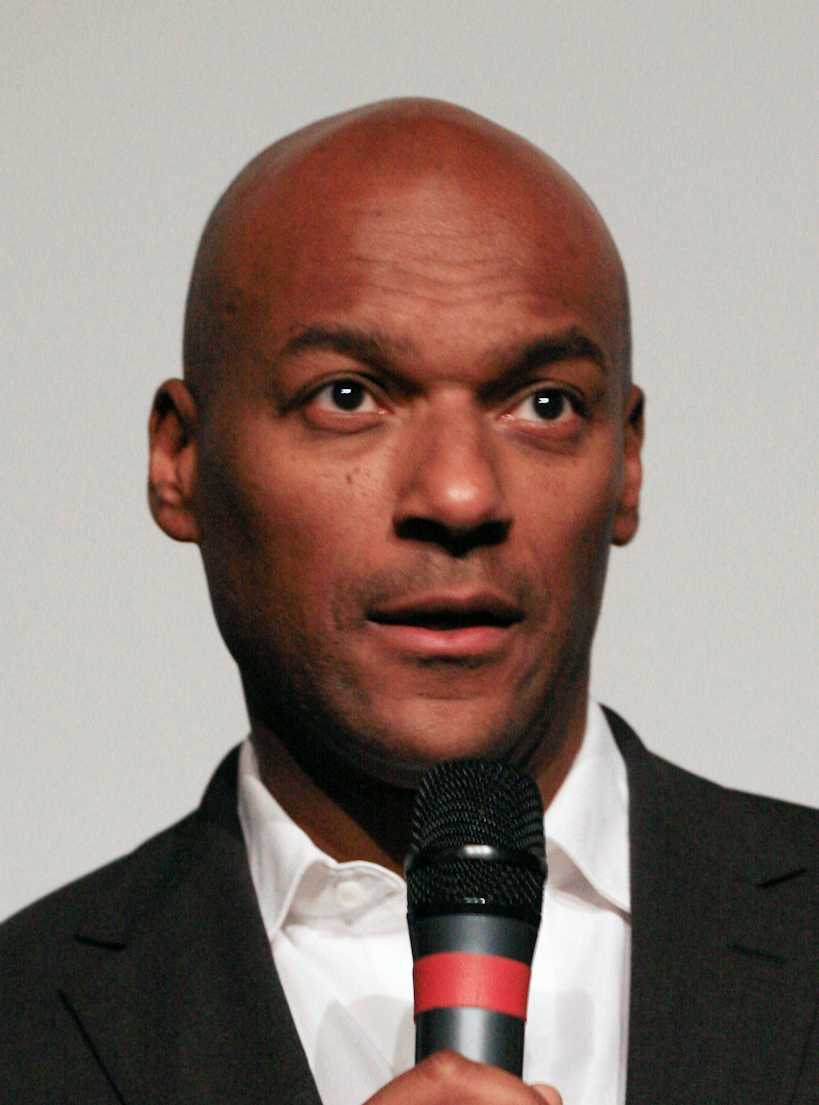
Colin Salmon (pictured) plays George Knight.

On 28 March 2023, the show announced that established actor Colin Salmon had been cast as George, and would join the show as the patriarch of the Knight family, which included George, his partner Elaine Peacock (Harriet Thorpe), and his daughters Gina (Francesca Henry) and Anna (Molly Rainford). Salmon was pleased to join the show and expressed excitement to explore George's character, believing he was able to embody some of George's characteristics. He continued by commenting that he had a "great affinity" for the show and that he was excited to become part of its history. Salmon explained that due to his wife's health, he wasn't able to work abroad, so decided to try for EastEnders after his agent suggested it. The actor said that executive producer Chris Clenshaw drew him to the role due to his passion for the show. The actor recalled some people warning him against working on a soap opera, but he detailed that he enjoyed the work ethic of it. He later opined that starring on a serial excited him as it allowed to "really explore character and impact". Salmon began filming in March 2023.

George, alongside the rest of the Knight family, was set to arrive in early Summer 2023. Clenshaw revealed that the family were created in January or February 2023, and commented that the show began the early stages of their development for much longer. The Knight family were the first dual heritage family to run a pub in a British soap opera. Salmon confirmed via his Twitter account that, after Elaine had entered in May, the remainder of the Knight family would make their first appearance on 1 June 2023, which was the 6708th episode of the serial. Ahead of the family's arrival, Clenshaw praised the actors and promised that the characters were written really well but will be even more extraordinary when seen on the screen.

=== Characterisation ===
Upon the announcement of the Knight family, George was billed as a "tough-talking", "fiercely protective", and "doting" father. Clenshaw described George as "a charming rogue and an old-school gent" who was close with his daughters. Salmon commented that George was "a true East End gentleman". In an interview with Radio Times, Salmon described his character as a "good man" and explained that George had a soft side to his personality as his experiences shaped him into a "warrior" who doesn't need to seem hard or to prove himself. Radio Times described George as the leader of the Knight family, and a new "lord of the manor", due to inheriting The Queen Victoria. They billed him as being "Impossibly tall and endlessly charismatic", with a reputation that proceeds him. The actor identified with his character, as both grew up in the East End of London and were surrounded by many strong women.

"When you are a big man, you have the power to hold people down or to lift them up – and George Knight is strong enough to lift people up. He's also a single parent, and he's had to get real, and I like that."

— Salmon discussing George's personality.

Prior to the arrival of the Knight family, Clenshaw described them as arriving with a lot of baggage, adding that since they would be at the heart of the show, they would frequently engage with the majority of the cast. After George's introduction he was considered to be "a hit" with the locals of Walford. George's backstory stated that he was once a successful London-based professional boxer under the name "Nightmare", before leaving London to run a bar in Marbella, Spain. Salmon attributed George's boxing success to being a controlled person. Although George's boxing career was in the character's past, with George now preferring to lead a simple life, Salmon explained that George turns to it as a way to decompress. George was described by Rachel Lucas of What's on TV as a "fighter" who no one should mess with. Helen Daly of Radio Times commented that while George appears to be a man of integrity, he hid "multiple secrets". Salmon considered his character as someone who dislikes being misunderstood.

=== Relationships ===
Discussing George's relationship with Elaine, Salmon described that the two are a happy couple, and moving to London allowed George to make himself open to Elaine. He continued by noting that Elaine "instils confidence" in George, knowing he is a "softie", and George always has her back in return. Salmon opined that the two made for a good couple as they acted as "equals". Explaining this, the actor continued and stated that unlike most people, Elaine looks George "in the eye", with George developing as a human being due to being told when he is wrong, concluding that it's why "Elaine is good for George". Thorpe added that as the two began their relationship later in life, they understand each other's desires and dislikes and accept each other for who they are. Stefania Sarrubba of Radio Times characterised George and Elaine's relationship as healthy and balanced.

Prior to his introduction, George was set to get off on the wrong foot with Linda Carter (Kellie Bright), as she was against him working in The Queen Victoria. Discussing how George would make up with Linda, Salmon said his character "just has to be consistent" for Linda to eventually "warm to him". Despite the rough start, Salmon teased that George would gain respect for Linda after recognising her as a "fellow warrior". After Linda grows suspicious of George's past, Salmon commented that despite her snooping getting on George's nerves, he empathises with her and understands the tough situation Linda has been put in, knowing that she used to run it with her missing husband, Mick Carter (Danny Dyer). Despite this, it was set that George would befriend Phil Mitchell (Steve McFadden). Clenshaw teased that it would begin after Phil recognised George from George's boxing days, and described their "quick" friendship as an exciting opportunity. It was stated that Phil liked George due to his history in professional boxing. After Phil accuses George of lying to Linda about his ex-wife, Salmon explained that George was furious and "affronted" by it as their friendship was built on a mutual respect and Phil's suspicions went against that, despite understanding how he reached the conclusion. He later added that George values Phil's respect, and that they were "two alpha males" who could confide in each other.

George's marriage to Rose Knight was billed as something difficult for George as it was tough to reflect on. Salmon expressed that he enjoyed the initial ambiguity of Rose and George's marriage. After it was revealed that Rose was Cindy Beale (Michelle Collins), it was said that Cindy would become an obstacle for his engagement to Elaine as George still has latent feelings for her. George was set to be shocked by Rose's return and identity reveal. Collins clarified that her character was unaware George, Gina, and Anna were in Walford. Salmon said that it will become evident how significant George's platonic relationship with Cindy is to him. He added that Cindy was the only person who can "talk him down", as she understood George more than any other character. Explaining Cindy and George's relationship, Collins commented that she had been told the characters had "great chemistry", which she attributed to her close connection with Salmon, as the two knew each other and quickly connected.

It was previously established that George's relationship with his eldest son, Junior, was "difficult". In May 2024, it was announced that actor Micah Balfour had been cast in the role, who would make his first appearance in June. George's relation to his estranged son was billed as a difficult one spanning decades. With Junior's introduction followed the arrivals of his wife Monique (Busayo Ige) and son Xavier (Chase Dean-Williams), which would take George aback, yet he was set to become close with Monique over their Ghanaian heritage. Balfour opined that George and Junior's complicated relationship was because they were similar people. He added that their relationship was not beyond repair, as it was evident they could rebuild it, but noted that even a single comment or action by either was enough to pull up the walls between them.

=== Identity and lineage ===
In December 2023, it was announced that George's estranged adoptive parents Eddie (Christopher Fairbank) and Gloria Knight (Elizabeth Counsell) would be introduced, with the desire to reconnect with their son. Clenshaw teased that it would be obvious why George avoided them. George's difficult relationship with his adoptive parents was teased to worsen due to his adoptive father's racist beliefs. Eddie's racism was to fracture relationships in the Knight family. It was later announced that Eddie and Gloria had adopted George through a process known as baby farming, where parents are paid to adopt children. The news was set to begin a storyline following George's identity struggles, with the two keeping secrets from George. The show worked with experts and people who lived through farming to ensure the plot was handled with accuracy. Clenshaw commented that George's story was employed as the show has "a rich history" of telling stories about challenging truths that arise in both the past and the present. He also added that George's story would make him question his identity when he discovers the true means by which his parents adopted him.

Later, it was announced that a special extended episode would air on 14 February 2024. The episode was set to focus on the Knight family. The episode was teased to uncover George's true origins, with Eddie and Gloria's lies all being exposed. Ahead of the episode's airing, Salmon appeared on the ITV breakfast television show Good Morning Britain to tease the episode. The actor commented that a running theme of the storyline is being able to tell someone's deeds before making a judgement. Following the episode, where Eddie's racism and murder of George's father were revealed, Salmon commented that during Eddie's murder trial, George still loved his adoptive father, despite it being seen as insane. He explained that George is struggling to understand Eddie's actions, but he understands that Gloria loved George a lot, and so he realises that Eddie also loved Gloria a lot, with all his actions doing whatever he could do to help her, and he called it "love, but twisted love". Around this time, Salmon noted his character was lacked much knowledge about his family and lack of connections, commenting that the character is aware of his ignorance and ready to learn more. Discussing Eddie's decision to withhold information about George's biological mother unless George testifies in his favour, Salmon explained that George was tempted by this, as Eddie would be the only one with this information. He added that Eddie knows how to aggravate George and compared the characters' dynamic to fighters in a boxing ring.

Explaining George's decision to testify against his adoptive father, Salmon commented that the decision came to George based on his guilt over witnessing the murder, and as a way to "redeem himself" and free Gloria from Eddie. After Gloria suffers a heart attack, Salmon explained that Gloria and George had bonded over living under Eddie's controlling rule, and enjoyed scenes where George was able to be there for her. The actor admitted his sympathy for Gloria, as her freedom from Eddie was immediately eclipsed by her fatal heart attack. With the storyline seemingly closing, Salmon voiced his appreciation for being at the centre of a storyline in the soap and seeing fan responses. Following her death, George begins self-destructing by turning to dangerous underground boxing, which Salmon explained was George's method of self-harm to feel emotions. He later added in an interview with What's on TV that George uses the ring as an outlet for his anger, but will eventually need to seek therapy to help him through his trauma.

On 14 August 2024, it was announced that George's biological brothers would join the soap, with actors Dayo Koleosho and Jonathan Nyati being cast to play the characters, to continue unravelling George's identity. Both actors expressed excitement to join the soap and be a part of the storyline. Clenshaw teased the brothers would need to work through a lot of complex emotions after being "torn apart by tragedy". It was confirmed that Kobina would leave quickly, while Kojo would become a regular, with Clenshaw teasing that it would give George an opportunity to be a brother figure. Salmon admitted feeling a personal connection to the story, as both Kojo and his son live with autism. He stated that: "it means a lot to me that we're representing that in the show".

== Storylines ==
=== Backstory ===
George was adopted by Eddie (Christopher Fairbank) and Gloria Knight (Elizabeth Counsell) when he was two years old. He grew up believing he was Jamaican. At age fifteen, George watched Eddie and his associates beat a Ghanaian man to death, while he cowered away. George later went on to work as a successful boxer, going by the name "Nightmare Knight", married a woman named Sabrina, and had his first child, Junior Knight (Micah Balfour). After divorcing Sabrina, George lost contact with Junior and moved to Marbella, where he married Rose Sawyer, and they had two daughters named Gina (Francesca Henry) and Anna Knight (Molly Rainford). Rose abandoned her family in 2014, which left George in a depressive state, and Gina being tasked with raising Anna. Years later, while working at a bar in Marbella, George met Elaine Peacock (Harriet Thorpe), and the two began a relationship.

=== 2023–present ===
When Elaine's daughter Linda Carter (Kellie Bright) asks for help to run The Queen Victoria in Walford, Elaine, George, Gina, and Anna move there. After George introduces himself to Linda, she is shocked as she did not know her mother had a boyfriend, and initially resents him as she only expected her mother's help. George later proposes to Elaine, which she declines but eventually accepts. As George becomes acquainted with the locals, some recognise him from his boxing past, including Phil Mitchell (Steve McFadden), whom he forms a friendship with. After pressing him for details about his ex wife Rose, George tells Linda that Rose abandoned their family without reason. Linda doubts the story and Phil later tells George that there is no record of Rose, according to his lawyer. Baffled, George tries to phone her, but is ignored. Rose reappears on Anna's 21st birthday, revealing her name is actually Cindy Beale (Michelle Collins), and that she assumed the identity of Rose after faking her death and entering witness protection decades ago. Cindy explains to a stunned George that she had to abandon the family after breaking witness protection by secretly returning to Walford after the murder of her daughter, and fearing harm would come to her new family. Against George's wishes, Cindy attempts to rebuild bridges with Gina and Anna.

On New Year's Day, Eddie and Gloria arrive in Walford to visit George. They reveal that he was adopted illegally through a process known as baby farming, meaning George's biological parents were not Jamaican, but in fact from Ghana. They later return seeking for George to provide a witness statement for Eddie, who is on trial for a racially motivated murder, George learns that the man Eddie murdered was his biological father, Henry Kofi Asare. George disowns them as a result and when the trial rolls around, he testifies against Eddie and gets him sent to prison. George later finds Gloria unconscious and when she is hospitalised, she reveals Eddie had been abusive towards her during their marriage. George comforts her and accompanies her as she dies from a heart attack. Broken by Gloria's death and his conflicted national identity, George begins self-destructing, coping by participating in underground boxing. He confides in Cindy and they share a kiss after a heart-to-heart. After George collapses, it is revealed that he sustained a brain condition from the fighting, with one more punch being enough to kill him. He later runs into his estranged son, Junior, as Anna called him in a desperate measure to help her father. While Junior and George's relationship remains strained, George bonds with his son's wife Monique (Busayo Ige) and grandson Xavier (Chase Dean-Williams). Elaine later reveals that she knew about George and Cindy's kiss and kicks him out. After Anna convinces her to give him another chance, George works on getting his life back on track.

When Monique leaves Junior after he cheats on her, taking Xavier, he begins an affair with Cindy. George's mother's friend Angela Lawal (Susan Anderin) introduces George to his biological brothers Kobina (Jonathan Nyati) and Kojo Asare (Dayo Koleosho). While Kobina is immediately angry with George for allowing their father to be murdered, Kojo is sympathetic and forgives him. After Kobina tells him how stressful it is caring for Kojo, who is autistic, George convinces him to allow Kojo to stay in Walford for the time being. While preparing for his wedding with Elaine, George is shocked to learn that she arranged for Cindy to honey trap him as a method of ensuring his loyalty. Despite this, he forgives her and they go on to marry. When Kojo is injured on the day of the wedding, George stays with him in hospital (unaware that Cindy is responsible as Kojo has discovered the affair). He then goes on honeymoon with Elaine.

Unbeknownst to George, Elaine discovers a recording of Cindy conversing with David Wicks (Michael French), which reveals her affair with Junior and her romantic feelings for George; she uses this to blackmail Cindy into leaving Walford. George experiences mixed emotions when she declares her intentions to leave and invites her to spend Christmas with the family. On Christmas Day 2024, Lauren Branning (Jacqueline Jossa), who had stolen the recording, tricks George into playing it in front of the whole pub. An enraged George disowns Junior and demands that he leaves Walford; Elaine is disappointed by George's reaction, which she believes evidences George's feelings for Cindy, so she ends their relationship and asks George to leave. Soon afterwards, George and Kathy Beale (Gillian Taylforth) discover Cindy in the Square after she is attacked; George accompanies Cindy to hospital. There, he is informed by Denise Fox (Diane Parish) that she spotted Junior hiding in an alleyway soon after the attack. George angrily confronts Junior when he discovers he is planning to flee to Dubai, but Junior protests his innocence. Afterwards, George convinces Kojo to provide him with a false alibi for the attack.

== Reception ==
In February 2024, Alex Whilding and Phoebe Tonks of OK! reported that George had "won over many fans" throughout his time on the show. The baby farming storyline was described as shocking by Grace Morris of What's on TV. Following the broadcast of the episode where Eddie confesses to murdering George's father, Laura Denby of Radio Times deemed the episode "powerful", and expressed interest in whether or not George would forgive Eddie and Gloria after the revelation. Sophie Dainty of Digital Spy commented that the episode turned George's life "upside down". Kerry Barrett of What's on TV described the episode as "powerful and emotional", and commented it stunned the fans and believed the show deserved awards for the episode. She added that it was a "harrowing watch" and praised the performances of the actors, particularly Salmon. Her colleague Rachel Lucas described the discovery as horrifying.

Salmon's co-star Rainford called his performance throughout the identity storyline "graceful". Rebecca Saye of Radio Times felt that the story was groundbreaking. Commenting on the viewer response to the storyline, Salmon said it had been "beyond expectation" to see responses from those who lived through farming and complex family situations, as well as seeing reactions from viewers excited to seeing colourism explored on television. Laura Denby of Radio Times called Gloria's death scene "moving" and added that Salmon's portrayal was powerful throughout the storyline. At the 29th National Television Awards, Salmon was longlisted for the award for the best "Serial Drama Performance". At the 2024 Radio Times Soap Awards, Salmon was nominated for "Best Actor", the child farming storyline was nominated for "Best Storyline", and the episode where George discovers Eddie murdered his father won the award for "Best Episode".
