= Gina Knight =

Fictional character from EastEnders

- EastEnders character
- Francesca Henry as Gina Knight (2024)
- Portrayed by: Francesca Henry; Kristen-Leigh Petit (2023 flashback)
- Duration: 2023–present
- First appearance: Episode 6708; 1 June 2023
- Introduced by: Chris Clenshaw
In-universe information
- Occupation: Barmaid
- Father: George Knight
- Mother: Cindy Beale
- Stepfather: Max Branning
- Stepmother: Elaine Peacock
- Sisters: Anna Knight
- Half-brothers: Junior Knight; Steven Beale; Peter Beale
- Half-sisters: Lucy Beale; Cindy Williams; Ivy Knight-Mitchell
- Grandfathers: Henry Kofi Asare; Eddie Knight (adoptive); Tom Williams
- Grandmothers: Margaret Abena Asare; Gloria Knight (adoptive); Bev Williams
- Uncles: Kobina Asare; Kojo Asare
- Aunts: Gina Williams
- Nephews: Xavier Knight; Louie Beale; Jimmy Beale
- Nieces: Beth Williams; Abi Branning
- Other relatives: Gordon (adoptive)

Gina Knight is a fictional character from the BBC soap opera EastEnders, played by Francesca Henry. Gina was introduced by executive producer Chris Clenshaw in episode 6708, broadcast on 1 June 2023. She was introduced as a member of the Knight family; the daughter of George Knight (Colin Salmon) and older sister of Anna Knight (Molly Rainford). Her older half-brother Junior Knight (Micah Balfour) was later introduced.

Her storylines in the series have included the reveal that her estranged mother Rose is actually established character Cindy Beale (Michelle Collins) and therefore discovering that Peter Beale (Thomas Law) is her half-brother; her cocaine addiction; her relationship with rapist Dean Wicks (Matt Di Angelo); suffering racial discrimination from her adoptive grandfather Eddie Knight (Christopher Fairbank); her friendships with Jay Brown (Jamie Borthwick) and Harry Mitchell (Elijah Holloway); supporting Anna through her abortion and after she is spiked; being a suspect in the "Who Attacked Cindy?" storyline; sleeping with Freddie Slater (Bobby Brazier) behind Anna's back; a relationship with Harry; and falling out with George after Eddie's return to the Square. In November 2026, it was confirmed that Henry would be leaving the show after over three years in the role of Gina.

== Development ==
=== Casting and creation ===
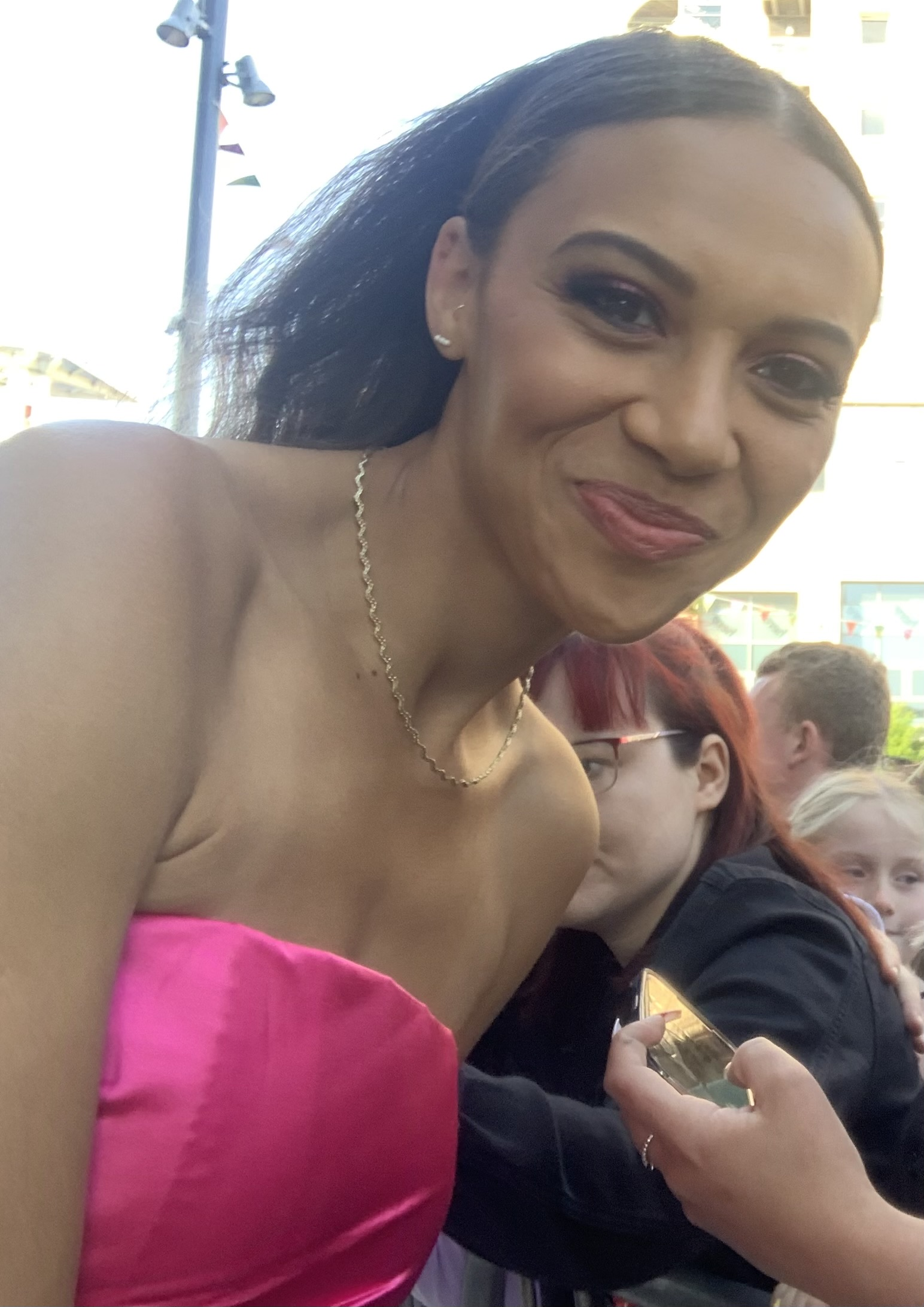
Francesca Henry (pictured) plays Gina Knight.

Gina was announced to debut alongside the rest of the Knight family, which included her father George Knight (Colin Salmon), his girlfriend Elaine Peacock (Harriet Thorpe), and Gina's younger sister Anna Knight (Molly Rainford), on 28 March 2023. Henry was excited to join the cast of EastEnders as she watched the show growing up, commenting that it was "surreal" to be on set. She added that it was a "true privilege to be trusted to bring Gina to the Square" and was thrilled to be introduced as a member of the new family unit. Gina, accompanied by the Knight family were set to arrive on the show in early Summer. The family were confirmed by Salmon to debut on 1 June 2023. Zaraah Abrahams, who plays Chelsea Fox on the show, acted as an on-set mentor for Henry. Clenshaw revealed that the family were created in January or February 2023, and commented that "they've been on paper for a hell of a long time". Gina made her first appearance in episode 6708, originally broadcast on 1 June 2023. The actress considered her casting to be the "privilege of a lifetime" as she watched from a young age.

=== Characterisation ===
Upon the Knight family's announcement, executive producer Chris Clenshaw billed Gina as "feisty", "determined", "demanding", "sharp", and "cool as cut diamonds but with a temper that blazes like fire". Radio Times added "she's got her dad's personality and is strong-willed to the point of no return" and that Gina is "not a girl to be messed with". He teased that the family's arrival would incite a "new dawn" for the soap, and added that the Knight family had been "bound together for years" and arrived in Walford in hopes of a "fresh start", only to be quickly "thrown into the heart of the Square". Commenting on Gina's backstory, Henry revealed that Gina had to grow up much quicker than Anna. She added that her caring responsibilities "burdened" Gina. Salmon echoed this, explaining that Gina "got [George] through what [he] went through", forcing her to mature quickly.

When asked of Gina's character, Henry described her as "really funny" and "really spiky". The actress continued by commenting that while Gina sees the best in people, she is less open than Anna and wants to be more like her. Henry described her character as being "difficult" but "kind", explaining that Gina "meets the world with a bit more difficulty than the rest of her family". In comparison to her sister, Gina is considered to be difficult to get along with. Henry shared that Gina, deep down, wanted to be more like her sister and wished for her care-free attitude, but struggled as "she finds it hard to meet the world in an open-hearted way". Henry teased that Gina and Anna would "[break] hearts" and pursue "anything with a pulse". Regarding Gina's relationship with Elaine, Henry commented that the characters would not get along, as Elaine threatened to overtake Gina's position in the family, adding "the eldest sister often takes on a lot of caregiving and emotional baggage of the family". Despite this, Henry believed Gina would put her father's happiness before her dislike of Elaine. Clenshaw explained that as the family would be moving into the show's central pub, The Queen Victoria, they would be at "the heart of the Square". He added that while everything may initially seem calm, the family had "a lot of baggage" waiting to be exposed. Henry detailed in an Inside Soap interview that she admired how Gina "sticks to what she thinks is right", even if she is in the wrong, but criticised her character for her occasionally selfish behaviour, concluding she probably would not get along with Gina in real life.

=== Relationships ===
==== Cindy Beale ====
After being told by Elaine that Rose used a false identity while Gina grew up, threatening to tear the family apart. Henry explained Gina's feelings of "pain and resentment" towards her estranged mother, as Rose's departure left her to be a maternal figure for Anna. Gina was the last member of her family told, due to her "volatile nature" and her family's awareness of her tendency to "spiral out of control". When asked who will face Gina's wrath after her discovery, Henry responded that while Gina blames herself, she would feel resentment for George due to how he handled the situation, which the actress said was "[not] as well as he thinks he has". The actress teased that Gina's emotional state would shine light on her inner struggles, explaining: "Gina is a lot more sensitive than she appears and I think she's absorbed a lot of the emotional damage that's happened to them [Gina and Anna] before they arrived in Walford. She's been like a bit of an emotional punch bag growing up which is why she is quite front-footed and defensive in situations where she doesn't have to be".

Clenshaw teased that as "life carries on in Walford", Gina, who he opined "takes after her mother" would react very differently than Anna. In a Digital Spy interview, Henry confirmed that Gina would begin a "self-destructive" path following the news. She explained that this was as Gina didn't allow herself to "feel anything", so the overwhelming news would cause her to become a "powderkeg of emotions". The actress added that Gina has to "shake pain off" and prefers to "[burn] through" her emotions, rather than reflect on them. This path was later revealed by the soap to be Gina's return to cocaine abuse. Following the reveal that Rose was in actuality a former established character who was believed to be dead, Cindy Beale (Michelle Collins), Gina initially disowns her mother for what she put the family through.

==== Dean Wicks ====
After it was revealed Gina had been dating Dean Wicks (Matt Di Angelo), who raped Linda in 2014, after believing his insistence that he was innocent, they resumed an on-off relationship when Dean returned to Walford. Gina was said to be in danger after a night with Dean "turns into terror" following her family learning of the relationship and Cindy's attempts to steer him away from Gina. The show later confirmed that this deal involved Cindy offering Dean money in exchange for him leaving Walford. Gina eventually turns on Dean and helps Linda's son Johnny Carter (Charlie Suff) wipe false evidence of Linda confessing she lied about her rape.

== Storylines ==
=== Backstory ===
Gina is the oldest daughter of George (Colin Salmon) and Rose Knight (Michelle Collins). She has a half-brother named Junior Knight (Micah Balfour) from George's previous marriage to a woman called Sabrina. Shortly after Gina was born, George and Rose had another daughter, her younger sister Anna Knight (Molly Rainford). While she grew up, she noticed that her adoptive grandfather Eddie Knight (Christopher Fairbank) would often look at her with contempt and disappointment. In 2014, Rose abandoned the family, leaving George broken and making Gina responsible for taking care of him and Anna. As George slowly recovered from his heartbreak, Gina developed a deep hatred for her mother. She and Anna adopted a chihuahua named Tyson before the family moved to Marbella to run a bar. While there, George meets Elaine Peacock (Harriet Thorpe) and they begin a relationship.

=== 2023–present ===
When Elaine's estranged daughter Linda Carter (Kellie Bright) asks for help to run The Queen Victoria public house in Walford, Elaine, George, Gina, and Anna move there. Linda is unhappy to see her mother's new family, and Gina and Anna initially anger several residents. This is worsened when they unintentionally disrespect people mourning the recent death of Lola Pearce-Brown (Danielle Harold). After they apologise, they begin flirting with Bobby Beale (Clay Milner Russell) and Freddie Slater (Bobby Brazier). When Gina learns that George proposed to Elaine, she is upset about the prospect of Elaine replacing Rose, but George comforts and assures her. When Elaine takes the girls out for food, she attempts to set Gina and Freddie up, but Gina shows an interest in Zack Hudson (James Farrar).

After George discovers Rose was using a false identity and tells Elaine, Gina learns this and begins using cocaine for the first time since she overcame an addiction to it. Ravi Gulati (Aaron Thiara) begins supplying Gina with cocaine as it is later uncovered that Anna had stolen money from the pub to hire a private investigator for information about their mother. During Anna's twenty-first birthday party, Rose reappears, leaving Gina and Anna shocked. Rose tells everyone her name is actually Cindy Beale (Michelle Collins) and that she used the false identity after faking her death and entering witness protection years before the girls were born. She explains that she left the family after learning of her other daughter being murdered in Walford and returning in secret, worrying that breaking her conditions could mean harm for her new family. Taken aback by the news, Gina overdoses on cocaine. After this, she decides to stop taking it.

Gina spray paints the word "rapist" on a shop owned by Dean Wicks (Matt Di Angelo) after learning he raped Linda years ago, despite this, Gina bonds with his daughter Jade Masood (Elizabeth Green) as they both grew up with an absent parent. She grows to believe Dean over Linda and begins a secret relationship with him. After it is exposed, to her family's fury, they break up following an argument. When Gina's grandparents, Eddie and Gloria Knight (Elizabeth Counsell), arrive to visit George, Gina clashes with Eddie as it is revealed that he is racist and was paid to adopt George and felt shame raising a black child. After Gina and Anna overhear them talking, they argue in the barrel store about how Anna has faced much less racial discrimination than Gina throughout life due to being able to "pass" as white. George later informs Gina and Anna that Eddie also murdered his biological father, Henry Kofi Asare.

After the news begins causing George to self-destruct, he runs into his son, Junior, while underground boxing. Gina is happy to see her brother again, and bonds with his wife Monique (Busayo Ige) and son Xavier (Chase Dean-Williams). However, they leave him after Junior cheats on Monique with Bianca Jackson (Patsy Palmer). When Anna falls pregnant, Gina supports her through her decision to have an abortion. When George ends his relationship with Elaine the day before their wedding, Gina convinces George to reconcile with her; she then encourages the couple to go on their honeymoon after George's brother Kojo Asare (Dayo Koleosho) is injured in an accident. Gina is disappointed when Cindy reveals she is moving to France, unaware that she is being blackmailed into it by Elaine, who has discovered that Cindy is having an affair with Junior. When Lauren Branning (Jacqueline Jossa) publicly reveals the affair on Christmas Day 2024, Gina is disgusted and disowns Cindy. Later that night, Gina sneaks out of The Queen Vic; at the same time, Cindy is viciously attacked by an unknown assailant. Gina returns and is informed by Elaine of the attack; she subsequently accompanies Cindy to hospital, where she accuses Cindy's fiancé Ian Beale (Adam Woodyatt) of being responsible. It is later revealed that Gina was having sex with Anna's boyfriend Freddie at the time that Cindy was attacked, removing her as a suspect in the investigation.

== Reception ==
After George revealed that Gina's mother was still alive, Laura Denby of Radio Times commented that Gina "went off the rails" as a result of the news. When the character returned to her cocaine addiction, buying drugs from Ravi Gulati (Aaron Thiara), Justin Harp of Digital Spy called the twist "disturbing" as Gina had "found a dangerous new dealer". His colleague, Brenna Cooper, wrote that a collapse Gina faced and the episode's insuring cliffhanger was "tragic".

In September 2023, Grace Morris of What's on TV reported fans of the soap accurately predicting Gina's ex-boyfriend being Dean. Denby also reported the predictions, adding that some viewers had speculated that her boyfriend was deceased character Fatboy (Ricky Norwood). Digital Spy writer Stephanie Chase reported similar predictions, considering Dean to be "the number one suspect" in the mystery identity of Gina's boyfriend. A scene where Gina opens up to Jay Brown (Jamie Borthwick) about a previous ex dying of an overdose, and her feelings of guilt towards what happened, was labelled "tragic" by Christine Maguire of Digital Spy. As fan theories surrounding Gina and Dean's relationship strengthened, Tamzin Meyer of Entertainment Daily reported that viewers were against the possibility of the characters being in a relationship. After scenes aired of Gina turning on Linda, believing Dean to be innocent, she reported that fans had heavily criticised Gina's writing, calling her believing him "ridiculous". Denby commented: "Gina can't see what's right under her nose". Morris wrote that fans had reacted positively to a scene where Amy Mitchell (Ellie Dadd) scolds Gina for dating Dean, as Dean had attempted to rape her mother, Roxy (Rita Simons).

Sophie Dainty of Digital Spy praised the show's wardrobe department, writing that Gina and Anna, despite causing "chaos", had delivered "a handful of stylish outfits" during their time on the soap. Lewis Knight of Radio Times listed Gina Knight as one of eight EastEnders character he hoped would be central to the show in 2025. He wrote "Gina is the most complicated and fiery member of the Knight clan" and praised Henry's performance as the character as "natural".

For her portrayal of Gina, Henry was nominated for the "Best Soap Newcomer" award at the 2023 I Talk Telly Awards. She won the award for "Rising Star" at the 2023 Digital Spy Reader Awards. She was nominated for Best Newcomer at the Radio Times soap awards in 2024.
