= Anna Knight =

Fictional character from EastEnders

- EastEnders character
- Molly Rainford as Anna Knight (2024)
- Portrayed by: Molly Rainford
- Duration: 2023–2025
- First appearance: Episode 6708; 1 June 2023
- Last appearance: Episode 7234; 2 December 2025
- Introduced by: Chris Clenshaw
In-universe information
- Occupation: Barmaid
- Father: George Knight
- Mother: Cindy Beale
- Stepmother: Elaine Peacock
- Sisters: Gina Knight
- Half-brothers: Junior Knight; Steven Beale; Peter Beale
- Half-sisters: Lucy Beale; Cindy Williams; Ivy Knight-Mitchell
- Grandfathers: Eddie Knight (adoptive)
- Grandmothers: Gloria Knight (adoptive)
- Uncles: Kobina Asare; Kojo Asare
- Nephews: Xavier Knight; Louie Beale; Jimmy Beale

Anna Knight is a fictional character from the BBC soap opera EastEnders, played by Molly Rainford. Anna first appears in episode 6708, originally broadcast on 1 June 2023, introduced alongside the Knight family. The newcomer family consisted of "bubbly" youngest daughter Anna, "fiery" and "demanding" older-sister Gina Knight (Francesca Henry) and "old-school gent" and "charming rogue" father George Knight (Colin Salmon), all set to join Elaine Peacock (Harriet Thorpe) in running the Queen Victoria public house, alongside Elaine's daughter Linda Carter (Kellie Bright), who is struggling to cope following the loss of her husband Mick Carter (Danny Dyer) on Christmas Day 2022.

Rainford's casting was initially reported on 1 March 2023, speculated until the production team for EastEnders confirmed the family were set to join the show on 28 March 2023. The character's backstory states that Anna's mother ran out on her family when Anna was only eleven. In a plot twist from episode 6719, originally broadcast on 21 June 2023, it was revealed Anna was in fact the daughter of Cindy Beale (Michelle Collins), to facilitate Collins' "return from the dead", after she was 'killed-off' in 1998 from an off-screen childbirth that resulted in the birth of Anna and Gina's older half-sister Cindy Jr (Mimi Keene). It was later revealed in a flashback episode Cindy that did not walk out on Gina and Anna: Cindy received news of the death of their other older half-sister, Lucy Beale (Hetti Bywater) in 2014 (see "Who Killed Lucy Beale?"), and returned to Albert Square, breaking her cover of witness protection that gained her the identity of "Rose Knight". Rainford did not initially know of the plot-twist; she found out within the same week it was transmitted. On 26 June 2025, it was announced that Rainford would be leaving the show after two years; she departed during the 2 December episode.

Her storylines since joining the show focused on her arrival and moving into The Queen Vic pub, to Linda Carter's (Kellie Bright) dismay; her relationships with Bobby Beale (Clay Milner Russell) and Freddie Slater (Bobby Brazier); being revealed as the daughter of Cindy Beale (Michelle Collins) and subsequently coming to terms with Cindy's abrupt return into her life after a nine-year absence; dealing with the family's troubles when it is revealed that George was baby-farmed and Eddie (Christopher Fairbank) murdered his father in a racist attack; being violently mugged and later being spiked; a love triangle with Bobby and Freddie; discovering she is pregnant by Bobby and subsequently having an abortion; and being a suspect in the "Who Attacked Cindy?" storyline.

== Development ==
=== Creation and casting ===
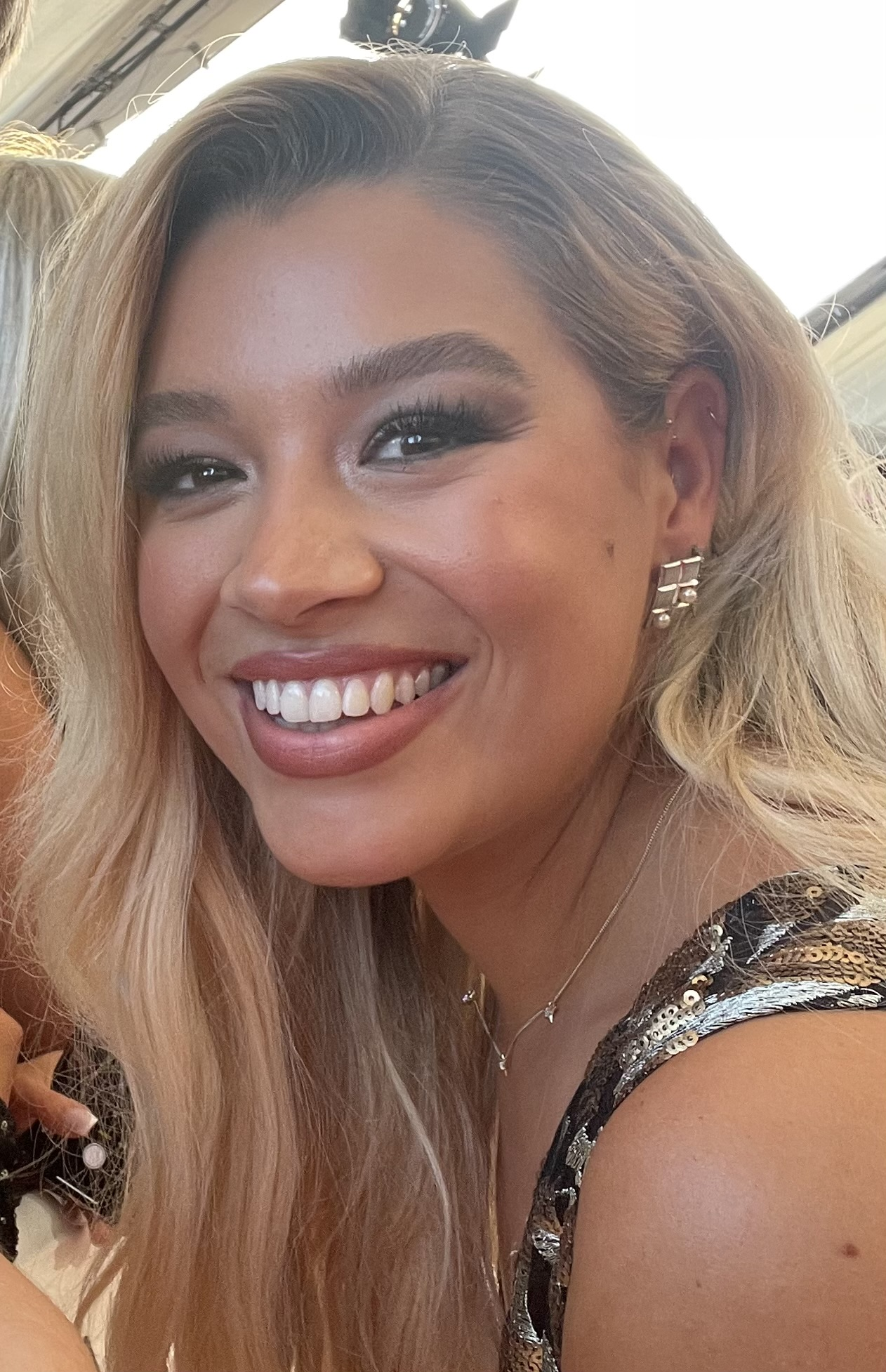
Molly Rainford portrays Anna Knight.

The casting of Molly Rainford was initially reported on 1 March 2023. Rainford was "tipped" to join the soap opera after newspaper The Sun reported her apparent role as "the daughter of a new family set to 'come in' and run the Vic". On 28 March 2023, it came to light Rainford was cast into the role of Anna, who is introduced alongside father George Knight (Colin Salmon) and sister Gina Knight (Francesca Henry) – all set to join Elaine Peacock (Harriet Thorpe) in running the Vic alongside a struggling Linda Carter (Kellie Bright) who lost her husband Mick (Danny Dyer) on Christmas Day 2022. Viewers would see the Knight family make their debut in early Summer of that year. Upon her casting, Rainford was delighted to be joining the soap opera, she said in a statement: "I'm SUPER excited to be joining the cast of EastEnders. It's such an iconic show which myself and my family love, so it's an honour to bring the character Anna Knight to life who is set to stir up drama upon her arrival. I've already met a few familiar faces from my time on Strictly and I can't wait to meet and be a part of the EastEnders family." Executive producer Chris Clenshaw teased the arrival of the Knight family and established the family would receive their own plot-line once "The Six" storyline had ended. He also was delighted of all four castings, especially the recast of Thorpe (Elaine). Clenshaw told the media: "George, Gina and Anna have been bound together for years and arriving in Walford is the fresh-start the Knights are looking for. We're thrilled to welcome this hugely talented group of actors; Colin Salmon, Harriet Thorpe, Francesca Henry and Molly Rainford who will be immediately thrown into the heart of the Square, and we can't wait for everyone to meet them." Anna makes her first appearance in episode 6708, originally broadcast on 1 June 2023.

Rainford again spoken out prior to her debut on joining the programme, she referred to the whole experience as "nuts" and had previously "resonated" with the show as she and her family watched EastEnders prior to her joining. When asked if the sisters are looking for love, she enthused that both Anna and Gina are excited to "explore the new eye candy on the Square rather than look for something too serious too soon", adding "the girls are typical 20-somethings and are just excited to be there". Anna is characterised as the "fun", "loveable" and "big-hearted" little sister. A "bubbly" character that should not be underestimated. Rainford praised actor and co-star James Bye (Martin), who she previously had met on Strictly, for making her feel so comfortable when she first joined EastEnders. Rainford further expressed her gratitude for the role as Anna: "You have to get stuck in. I'm grateful that we've come in as a family and we're lucky to be in The Vic. We meet so many other cast so it really gets us pretty welcomed very quickly. They're such a lovely bunch and like a family already, which is great for us." Rainford has since called for scenes with Phil Mitchell (Steve McFadden) as she believes it would be "scary". When asked if she would stay in the soap opera, she responded: "I'm hoping to be a legacy character. I love the show. I've always loved it since I was little and just to be on it with people that I've watched for that long is an honour." In June 2025, it was announced Rainford would depart the role.

=== Role in the Knight family ===
"Anna is the light-hearted bubbly character, who wants to get on with everyone. She's excited about her new life in Walford. But actually the great thing is that, in the trio of dad and sister, she is the glue that holds them together. It's lovely to be a part of the family in that way. Sometimes kindness can be mistaken for weakness, but she shows that is not the case. She is the baby – they're always the glue."

— Rainford on Anna's role in the Knight family.

Rainford spoke out about her role in the family dynamic whilst teasing a "change" in Anna's character. Viewers were set to see a "different side to Anna" when she is revealed as the daughter of Cindy and Gina is sent on a "downward spiral". Rainford also mentioned the type of relationship Gina and Anna have: "Throughout their lives, Gina has always been the one that's been mothering Anna and protecting her. But I think actually if you look deep down, Gina is the one who is slightly more scared by the whole thing, perhaps because she's seen a bit more and because she's a bit older when it all happened. Anna will take being mothered from Gina for as long as she needs to, but actually she's there to step up when Gina is a bit more vulnerable." She continued on: "For Anna and her dad, unfortunately it's not something that they haven't seen before, so they know she does have the tendency to spiral out of control. They're both doing everything in their power to stop that, but when feelings and people are involved, that's never the case. Anna is more concerned for her sister's safety and her wellbeing. All she wants is her family to be happy." Rainford added: "Viewers can expect to see a different side to Anna – a slightly more 'Knight' side. I think they can expect to see Anna being a bit more determined and a bit more mature as she steps into a different role in her family dynamic."

When Anna decides to hire a private investigator for Cindy, it was reported her role in the family dynamic once again would be tested. Anna decides to steal money from The Vic's tills. Rainford defended Anna: "It's definitely not something that she would do and I think that's why her family don't believe it's her at first, because it is just so out of character. Deep down, she of course didn't want to do that but it is the last resort for Anna. I think Anna has a massive conflict between doing what's right for her versus what's right for her family. She knows she will open some old wounds by doing this and she doesn't want to hurt her dad by going against him. Anna is very happy with her family situation at the moment, she loves Elaine, so wouldn't want to cause any harm in that relationship, but she's also at the age where she needs to know answers about her own identity. By doing this though, she knows she'll have to go against what her family wants but I think she has to be selfish in this moment." Rainford admitted it would be hard for Anna to see George and Gina's disappointment: "I don't know whether I would say fair, but I understand why Gina said that and feels this way, Gina, for a long time, has stepped into that maternal role even though she's not that much older than Anna. She's always felt that burden of her mum leaving, more than Anna realises, so Gina's doing this because she wants to protect Anna." She continued on: "I think Anna appreciates that but I don't think she feels it's fair as she wants to know more about her mum. I think that's the thing that overrides it and persuades her to reach out to the investigator."

=== Spiking storyline ===
EastEnders announced the new workings on an issue-based storyline that would see Anna's character set to be spiked on a night out with her sister Gina and friends Freddie Slater (Bobby Brazier), Bobby Beale (Clay Milner Russell) and Felix Baker (Matthew James Morrison). The announcement came to light on 2 July 2024. The story is dubbed "Spiked". Anna is on a night-out at Peggy's wine bar where she is spiked – initially unnoticed as her behaviour is believed to be from her alcohol consumption. When her behaviour does not equate to the amount of alcohol she has had, the night out was set to turn south. EastEnders worked with charities Stamp Out Spiking and WithYou as well as experts in the field to ensure the storyline was portrayed as accurately and as sensitively as possible. The episode was set to be transmitted on 16 July 2024. A digital series of each characters point of view was also set to be released accessible from a QR Code from the episode. The BBC stated: "In a digital first for EastEnders, an exclusive five part miniseries will be made accessible to viewers via a QR code that will feature within the main episode which will take the audience to a link giving them the option of which platform to watch through. The digital series will offer a unique insight as viewers see the incident from Anna's own perspective, and from the perspective of her friends."

"With incidents of spiking rising at alarming rates across the UK in recent years, we chose to explore this issue with Anna Knight who represents the demographic most affected by spiking. It was imperative for us to work alongside organisations to accurately present, and sensitively portray this storyline, and Molly's [Rainford] performance has thoughtfully demonstrated the dangerous realities of spiking as we look to raise awareness of the warning signs and symptoms to look out for after an individual has been spiked."

— Executive producer Chris Clenshaw on the storyline.

Fiona Campbell, BBC Controller Youth Audience, spoken out on the storyline: "Following the success of the recent digital collaboration with EastEnders, which saw them move into scripted content in the vertical digital format for the first time – we're incredibly excited to step further into this innovative area with a storyline that has great public relevance. For the first time, EastEnders will incorporate a QR code within the main show, taking viewers to the spin off which will be available across multiple digital platforms reaching wider audiences, and those most affected by spiking. EastEnders is one of the BBC's highest performing shows for young audiences and driving its awareness on short form video platforms where these audiences find much of their daily content diet is a priority for us." Dawn Dines, CEO and Founder at Stamp Out Spiking added: "EastEnders is a wonderful vehicle to drive the safeguarding message and with its huge popularity amongst a wide range of the public, it will help inspire conversations to help protect men and women being targeted. Education is key to preventing these incidents. Stamp Out Spiking are delighted to have taken part in bringing the essential storyline to the screen." A follow-up report on more details came to light on 9 July 2024. The night takes a "terrifying turn" and Anna awakes in hospital, where she is given the information that her drink was spiked. Anna is not willing to report the crime to the police – much to George and Gina's disbelief.

=== Relationships ===
==== Cindy Beale ====
In a scene from episode 6719, originally broadcast on 21 June 2023, Anna and Gina are revealed to be the daughters of Cindy Beale (Michelle Collins). The plot twist allowed Collins' to facilitate her return to the soap opera after her character, Cindy, was killed off in 1998 by childbirth. An extended episode was confirmed for the Rose Knight reveal and the culmination of Ian Beale (Adam Woodyatt) and Cindy's return. When asked if she was excited about the Rose Knight twist, Collins said: "Yes, I was really excited. She's complex, obviously Cindy is incredibly complex, but she's not the same as before. It's 26 years later and she's been through quite a lot. I can't believe how many children she had – I'm still getting my head around that." A flashback episode revealed Cindy had not walked out on the family, she had received the news of the death of her daughter Lucy Beale (Hetti Bywater; see "Who Killed Lucy Beale?"). She traveled back to the United Kingdom to Albert Square where she had broken her cover from Witness Protection after taking a plea bargain. Unable to guarantee the Knight family safety, Cindy decided to not return to Marbella. She explains the truth to her family upon her return in episode 6758, originally broadcast on 29 August 2023.

Rainford later told Inside Soap that she found out about the plot twist within the same week as viewers. She said: "I literally found out the same week that the viewers did! We had our inklings, and we were all trying to guess, because they did say that there was someone coming back to be our mum. We only met Michelle a couple of days before her episode aired. It felt like the Knight puzzle had been put together, and Michelle was just really cool – she's so iconic in EastEnders. It just felt as if this was going to be something really special." It was reported EastEnders were set to revisit the 'Rose Knight' saga once again prior to Collins' full time return to the programme – it came to light on 21 July 2023. Anna decides to hire a private investigator in order to track her mother down – much to the dismay of George and Gina. Rainford told Digital Spy: "I think she, out of her and Gina, has always been the one to hold on and champion her mum. She's always been the one to wonder the reason why she left as she believes their mum wouldn't have just left with no explanation. I think she's always been so curious and always hopeful." When asked about the lengths Anna would go towards to obtain the private investigator, Rainford replied that stealing money is "100% out of character" for Anna, noting that she "isn't a dishonest person at all" and "it just shows that desperation even more". Rainford also noted that Anna "definitely feels guilty" about going behind her family's back, adding: "Anna is selfless and I think this whole situation of trying to find her mum is quite out of character as she has never gone against her family before. I think it just shows how important it is to her, as she definitely feels so guilty because she knows what has happened in the past and what the family went through."

Rainford emphasised Anna wanted to forgive Cindy, she told TV Times Magazine: "It's so hard for Anna, because she wants to do right by her dad, but she also wants a relationship with her mum. I think there are some plans coming up where there's a bit more balance." She also noted Gina's reaction behind it, citing Gina as "afraid" as Rainford believed if anyone was to "look deeper into it", Gina would be "the more fragile one".

==== Bobby Beale ====
Rainford shared her thoughts on her new romances with Inside Soap in July 2023. She found it hard to think of an answer which out of Bobby and Freddie she would more than likely enter a relationship with as she believed "there's traits in both of them that she's suited to", when speaking about Bobby, she continued: "I guess she's a bit more confident than Bobby, but she finds it quite endearing that he's a bit nervous and shy around her." The production team for EastEnders hinted signs of heartbreak for Bobby as Anna would get closer to Freddie. Bobby tries to adapt to a new personality for Anna – pushing her to Freddie. They bond over a drink as they share experiences of feeling let down by parents. Anna abruptly ends her relationship with Bobby when Cindy made her return. Anna is pushed to her limit and decides to later sleep with Freddie – cheating on Bobby in the process. Rainford noted the circumstances between Anna and Bobby is "hard" due to the confusing nature of their familial ties. Rainford hinted at a future for Anna and Bobby in October 2023. Rainford told TV Times Magazine that Anna had realised her feelings for Bobby as soon as she first entered the Square – defending the plot: "But it's a hard situation to navigate when you've got someone who's part of your family, but not your family. It would be really cute if they could make a go of things." Milner Russell announced his departure from the soap opera in April 2024. A love triangle was once again hinted at by EastEnders post-exit announcement. Bobby attempts to step up for Anna and support her when she is spiked to no avail as he continually misspeaks.

==== Freddie Slater ====
Rainford shared her thoughts on her new romances with Freddie to Inside Soap in July 2023. She found it hard to think of an answer which out of Bobby and Freddie she would more than likely enter a relationship with as she believed "there's traits in both of them that she's suited to", when speaking about Freddie, she continued: I think she likes how Freddie doesn't have a filter and just does stuff. He makes her laugh. So I don't know yet, I'm still trying to work it out myself!" EastEnders placed Anna and Freddie closer to each other as Anna loses interest in Bobby. They bond over a drink sharing experiences of feeling let down by their parents. Cindy's abrupt return in Anna's life led her to sleep with Freddie – cheating on Bobby in the process. Rainford threw Freddie's name "into the mix" when talking of a future with Bobby. She conveyed that whilst Freddie may "be the obvious guy for her", she believed Bobby would have Anna in the end. A relationship for Anna and Freddie was hinted at once again in June 2024 after Freddie joins the date of Bobby and Anna. Freddie "steps up" and supports Anna through her spiking ordeal as she can not connect with Bobby. Freddie advises her to tell George about her spiking, she takes his advice and George is made aware days later.

== Storylines ==
Anna, along with sister Gina Knight (Francesca Henry) and father George Knight (Colin Salmon) arrive on the Square. They move into The Queen Victoria public house, but are not expected by Linda, as Elaine Peacock (Harriet Thorpe) did not alert Linda of her fiancé and his family's arrival. They go to the café, where they clash with Kathy Beale (Gillian Taylforth), unaware of the recent death of Lola Pearce-Brown (Danielle Harold) the previous day. The sisters attract romantic attention from Bobby Beale (Clay Milner Russell) and Freddie Slater (Bobby Brazier). Anna decides to hire a private investigator to find out where her mother Rose Knight is. George and Gina have a very bad reaction to this news, so Anna fires the investigator. She also embarks on a romance with Bobby.

The private investigator finds Rose's phone number, so Anna leaves her a voicemail suggesting she wants Rose back in her life. "Rose Knight" is revealed to be Cindy Beale (Michelle Collins), who was thought to have died in childbirth 25 years ago. Ian Beale (Adam Woodyatt) – Cindy's ex-husband who she has reconnected with over the past year – sees the voicemail, and deletes it once Peter Beale (Thomas Law) has already seen it.

Peter returns to the square for Gina and Anna, and they briefly interact. Cindy follows Peter back to Albert Square, and she is reunited with Gina and Anna in a public reveal in front of the residents in The Queen Vic. Everyone in the pub gossips and learns of Cindy's backstory, later finding out Cindy had taken the identity of "Rose Knight" and emigrated to Marbella, where she gave birth to Gina and Anna. Anna struggles to come to terms with Cindy's nine year absence, and strides along with Gina to Peggy's wine bar. Anna bumps into Freddie, and has sex with him in the fish and chip shop owned by Ian. Ian learns of Freddie's deceit, and fires him, before revealing to everyone in The Queen Vic about their one-night-stand. Gina punches Ian for badmouthing Anna, and Bobby is inconsolable. Bobby does not talk to Freddie and Anna for some time.

Anna supports Freddie when he meets his rapist father Graham Foster (Alex McSweeney). Graham and Freddie argue over his conception, and Graham takes it to the extra step of insulting Anna, causing Freddie to freak out. They both later leave, and Freddie arrives home to Theo Hawthorne (William Ellis) attempting to rape Stacey Slater (Lacey Turner). Freddie leaves the square, and he is forgiven by Bobby. Bobby later forgives Anna, and the pair strike up their romance once again. Both of them go out for a meal with Cindy, Ian and Peter. They believe it is a dinner date, and it goes well until Bobby orders lobster and Anna discovers the lobster is boiled alive. Anna and Bobby take the lobsters and free them back into the sea. They plan to go onto another date, but Cindy does not approve, and is not willing to warm to the idea of Anna and Bobby dating, as Bobby killed Lucy in 2014. This does not affect the way Anna perceives Bobby, as she tells Elaine she has feelings for him. Elaine jokingly tells her to marry him, and they both kiss in front of their families.

Anna supports George throughout the baby farming revelation. It is later revealed that George's adoptive father Eddie Knight (Christopher Fairbank) murdered George's biological father in a racially aggravated attack almost 40 years prior. Eddie and his wife Gloria (Elizabeth Counsell) invite George, along with Elaine, Anna and Gina, to a party at their apartment, where Gina quickly picks up that George, Anna and herself are the only black people there. One of Eddie's friends reveals to George the true intentions of Eddie's motive: a positive character statement to prove he is not racist. This causes a huge revelation in The Queen Vic that causes multiple arguments within the family.

Anna and Gina argue over their experiences of racism, with Anna stating she is the exact same heritage as Gina. Gina then tries to make Anna realise that because Gina did not bleach her hair, nor take after her mother, she experienced a heavier tone of racism. Anna argued against this, and Gina mentions the difference in treatment they receive from Eddie. Eddie said Gina's hair needs to be "tamed" and continuously makes racist comments towards her that are always brushed off by George.

The girls learn of the ordeal currently going on in their family only days before the trial. The family attend Eddie's trial to support George. When leaving the court room, George is encouraged to go after Gloria. He finds her, but she has had a heart attack and is lying unconscious on the floor. Gloria dies in hospital, and Eddie bans George from the funeral; Anna catches wind of this and contacts Eddie to try and see if he would give any information on Gloria's funeral date, time or location (Eddie treats Anna more favourably, as she is perceived to act more white, whereas Gina is of a darker complexion).

Eddie reveals that George had already missed Gloria's funeral, and this sends George on a downward spiral. He starts going to illegal boxing fights, where he eventually meets a match in his son Junior (Micah Balfour), Anna's older half-brother, who she starts to bond with, alongside his wife Monique (Busayo Ige) and son Xavier Knight (Chase Dean-Williams). Monique and Xavier later leave after Junior cheats on her with Bianca Jackson (Patsy Palmer). Junior later comes to Anna's rescue after she is mugged; Junior begins an affair with Cindy.

Anna goes on a date with Bobby, and Freddie ends up joining them, where its clear there is romantic tension between her and Freddie. It is clear that they miss each other when Freddie is absent from the Square after attacking Theo Hawthorne (William Ellis) for attempting to rape his cousin, Stacey Slater (Lacey Turner) and their attractive grows upon his return, upsetting Bobby when he catches them sharing a kiss in the Vic after she reveals she is pregnant with Bobby's baby and wants an abortion. Despite Anna's attempts to convince Bobby their relationship could work, he breaks up with her, and leaves the Square with his adoptive mother, Jane Beale (Laurie Brett}.

During Christmas 2024, Anna and the rest of her family disown Cindy when her affair with Junior is revealed, and Anna becomes a prime suspect when Cindy is attacked on the Square that night, though Anna is cleared when the culprit is revealed to be Kathy Beale (Gillian Taylforth). Anna falls out with Gina temporarily when she discovers that she slept with Freddie on the night of Cindy's attack, and is visibly affected by the death of Martin Fowler (James Bye) when her home is destroyed by an explosion caused by Reiss Colwell (Jonny Freeman) during the 40th anniversary live episode. Anna and her family eventually leave the Queen Vic during the summer of 2025 when George, Elaine and Linda sell the pub to Kat Slater (Jessie Wallace) and Alfie Moon (Shane Richie).

Later in the year, Kat's daughter Zoe Slater (Michelle Ryan) helps Anna and Freddie reconcile with each other. They admit their feelings, and Anna asks Freddie to join her travelling the world, leaving together to go backpacking with the blessings of both of their families.

== Reception ==
Prior to the Cindy Beale (Michelle Collins) plot twist that revealed she was in fact Anna and Gina (Francesca Henry)'s mother, many viewers had previously speculated whether this was the cause of Cindy's return. Dan Seddon of Digital Spy predicted a "bruising love triangle storyline" for Anna, Bobby Beale (Clay Milner Russell) and Freddie Slater (Bobby Brazier) after the EastEnders production team "hinted at heartbreak" for Bobby as Anna and Freddie get close. Fans 'rumbled' a 'baby twist' that would see Anna become pregnant by Freddie after their "night of passion". Brenna Cooper of Digital Spy branded the scenes of Gina and Anna sharing experiences of racism as "powerful".

Maisie Spackman from Metro cited Anna as a "beloved character" after she was robbed in violent scenes. A scene of Freddie joining Anna and Bobby's date with clear tension between Anna and Freddie left viewers to predict Anna and Freddie would have an affair behind Bobby's back, causing his eventual departure. Helen Daly of Radio Times referred to Anna's issue-led based storyline dubbed "Spiked" as a "one-of-a-kind storyline". Erin Zammitt of Digital Spy called Anna's night out a "terrifying turn".

Rainford was nominated for "Best Soap Newcomer" in the I Talk Telly 2023 soap awards. She was also nominated for "Best Supporting Actress in a TV Series" for her work in EastEnders at the National Film Awards UK 2024.
