= Francesca Henry =

English actress (born 1995)

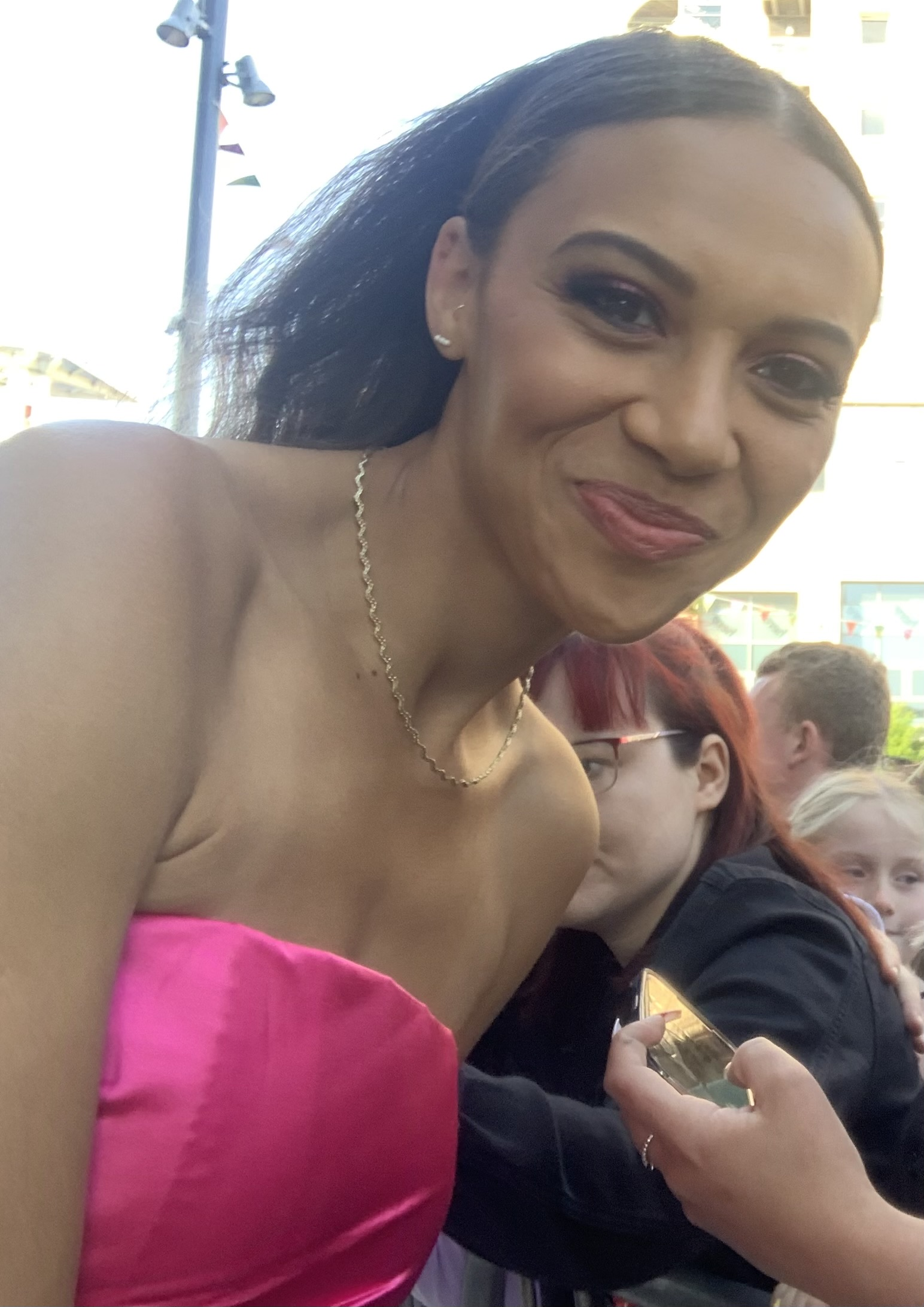
- Henry in 2023
- Born: Francesca Eloise Henry; March 1995 (age 31); Waltham Forest, London, England
- Education: University of Bristol; Royal Welsh College of Music & Drama
- Occupation: Actress
- Years active: 2018–present
- Television: Doctors; A Discovery of Witches; Silent Witness; EastEnders

Francesca Eloise Henry (born March 1995) is an English actress. She began her career appearing in various television and stage shows including Doctors, A Discovery of Witches and Silent Witness, before being cast in the BBC soap opera EastEnders as Gina Knight in 2023.

== Early life and education ==
Francesca Eloise Henry was born in March 1995 in Waltham Forest, London, and attended Forest School, Walthamstow. She began studying MA Acting at the Royal Welsh College of Music & Drama in 2017.

== Career ==
Henry made her acting debut appearing as PC Alice Brody in the BBC medical soap opera Doctors. Henry made her stage debut in the play The Wolves. She has appeared in various other productions, with her roles including Emily Webb in Our Town, Ashley in Germ Free Adolescent, The Letters Project, Honey in Who's Afraid of Virginia Woolf? and Rosencrantz in Hamlet. In 2022, Henry appeared in the recurring role of Celine in A Discovery of Witches. She also portrayed Nix Greaves in the Amazon Prime series Chelsea Detectives and Charlie Jarrett in an episode of the twenty-first series of Silent Witness. The same year, she made her film debut in 2.0 Lucy, in which she played the role of Alyssa.

In 2023, Henry was cast in the BBC soap opera EastEnders as Gina Knight. Her character is the eldest daughter in the Knight family, who were introduced as new owners of the fictional Queen Vic pub. She made her on-screen debut on 1 June 2023 alongside the character's on-screen father George (Colin Salmon) and younger sister Anna (Molly Rainford). Henry described Gina as "spiky" and said that she "sees kindness in everyone and wants to be more like her sister Anna, but finds it hard to meet the world in an open-hearted way." In 2024, Henry appeared in the Amy Winehouse biopic Back to Black as Winehouse's friend, Chantelle Dusette.

== Filmography ==
Year	Title	Role	Notes	Ref(s)
2019	Doctors	PC Alice Brady	Episode: "The Rabbit Hole"	
2022	A Discovery of Witches	Celine	2 episodes	
2022	The Chelsea Detective	Nix Greaves	Episode: "Mrs Romano"	
2022	Silent Witness	Charlie Jarrett	Episode: "History – Part 4"	
2022	2.0 Lucy	Alyssa	Film role	
2023–2026	EastEnders	Gina Knight	Regular role	
2024	Back to Black	Chantelle Dusette	Film role	

== Stage ==
Year	Title	Role	Venue	Ref.
2018	The Wolves	#2	Theatre Royal Stratford East	
2019	Our Town	Emily Webb	Regent's Park Open Air Theatre	
2019	Germ Free Adolescent	Ashley	The Bunker	
2019	The Letters Project	Unknown	Gate Theatre	
2020	Who's Afraid of Virginia Woolf?	Honey	Tobacco Factory Theatre	
2022	Hamlet	Rosencrantz	Shakespeare's Globe	

== Awards and nominations ==
Year	Ceremony	Category	Work	Result	Ref.
2023	I Talk Telly Awards	Best Soap Newcomer	EastEnders	Nominated	
2023	Digital Spy Reader Awards	Rising Star	EastEnders	Won	
2024	RadioTimes.com Soap Awards	Best Newcomer	EastEnders	Nominated	
