= Chris Clenshaw =

British television producer (born 1986)

- Born: Christopher Clenshaw; 29 September 1986 (age 39); Gravesend, Kent, England
- Occupation: Television producer
- Years active: 2007–present
- Employer: BBC
- Works: Richard & Judy; This Morning; Holby City; EastEnders

Christopher "Chris" Clenshaw (born 29 September 1986) is an English television producer, known for serving as the executive producer of the BBC soap opera EastEnders from 2022 to 2025.

== Life and career ==
=== Early life and television production work ===
Christopher "Chris" Clenshaw and his twin sister Georgia were born on 29 September 1986 in Gravesend, Kent to Greek-Cypriot mother Helen (née Antoniou) and English father Alfred Clenshaw, a Woolwich market trader.

Clenshaw began his career in television production working as an edit assistant on the BBC Three factual programme Freaky Eaters, before becoming a runner and ultimately head researcher on Richard & Judy between 2008 and 2009. He then worked as a shooting researcher on various shows including Local Food Hero, 3@Three and One Night Stand with Ne-Yo. In 2010, Clenshaw joined the ITV daytime programme This Morning, initially as a researcher before going on to hold an array of positions within their production team including edit producer, assistant producer and digital producer prior to his departure from the programme in 2015.

=== EastEnders ===
In July 2015, Clenshaw joined the BBC soap opera EastEnders as a writer and storyliner, before being promoted to script editor and ultimately story producer, before he left the role in January 2019 to become the producer of the BBC medical drama Holby City. In November 2021, Clenshaw was announced as the new executive producer of EastEnders. Clenshaw took over from Jon Sen, and his first credited episode as executive producer was episode 6497, originally broadcast on 2 June 2022 and featured cameos from Charles, Prince of Wales and Camilla, Duchess of Cornwall as part of the Platinum Jubilee of Elizabeth II celebrations. During his tenure, Clenshaw oversaw the returns of Alfie Moon, Keanu Taylor, Ricky Butcher, Mo Harris, Ryan Malloy, Dean Wicks, Lisa Fowler, Yolande Trueman, Lauren Branning, Peter and Ian Beale, Graham Foster, Bianca Jackson, Lucas Johnson, Jane Beale, Chrissie Watts, Jake Moon, David Wicks, Ruby Allen, Mickey Miller, Nigel Bates, Minty Peterson, Garry Hobbs, Grant Mitchell, Bex Fowler, Rocky Cotton and Angie Watts (Anita Dobson) as a hallucination, as well as the recasts of Amy Mitchell, Freddie Slater, Elaine Peacock, Penny Branning, Johnny Carter and Vicki Fowler, the departures of Rainie Cross, Mick Carter, Janine Butcher, Whitney Dean, Martin Fowler, Ruby Allen, Sonia Fowler, Bex Fowler and Bianca Jackson and lastly, the reintroduction of Cindy Beale, who returned from the dead after 25 years. In September 2024, it was announced he would step down as executive producer of EastEnders in February 2025, following the soap's 40th anniversary celebrations. His final episode as executive producer aired 13 June 2025.

== Filmography ==
Year	Title	Role
2007	Freaky Eaters	Edit assistant
2008	Richard & Judy	Runner
2008	Saturday Kitchen Live	Runner
2008	Richard & Judy's New Position	Head runner
2009	Richard & Judy	Researcher
2009	British Book Awards	Researcher
2009	Rachel Allen: Home Cooking	Shooting researcher
2009	Big Brother's Little Brother	Floor manager
2009	Local Food Hero	Shooting researcher
2010	3@Three	Shooting / studio researcher
2010	One Night Stand with Ne-Yo	Shooting researcher
2010–2015	This Morning	Researcher / producer
2015	Big Brother's Bit on the Side	Edit producer
2017–2019	EastEnders	Story producer / script editor
2019–2020	Holby City	Producer
2021	Bulletproof	Senior story producer
2022–2025	EastEnders	Executive producer
2025	EastEnders: 40 Years on the Square	Himself (interviewed guest)

Media offices
Preceded by Jon Sen	Executive producer of EastEnders; 2 June 2022 – 13 June 2025	Succeeded by Ben Wadey
