= Molly Rainford =

English singer and actress (born 2000)

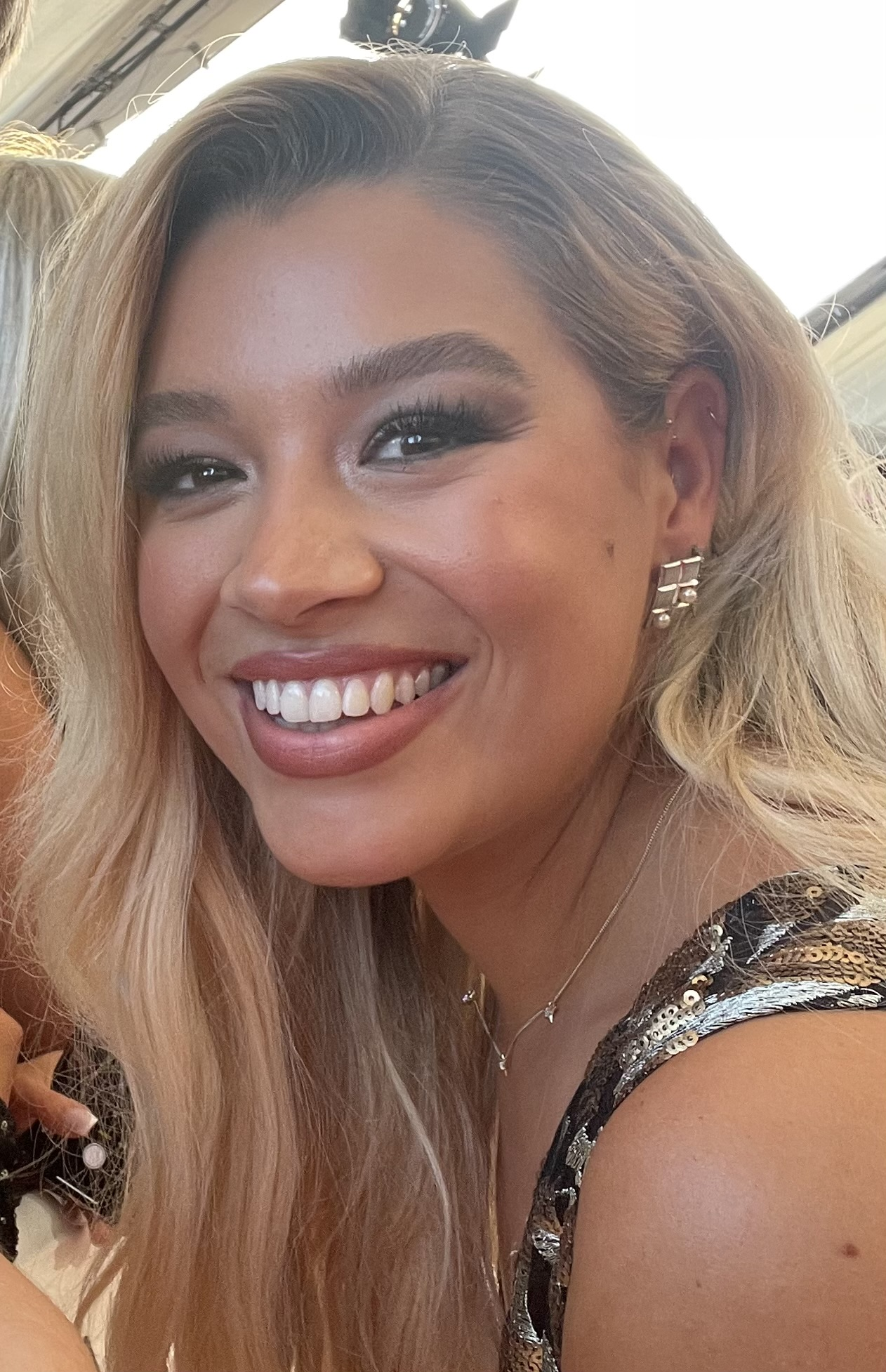
- Rainford in 2024
- Born: Molly Anne Rainford; 22 November 2000 (age 25); Havering, London, England
- Education: Sylvia Young Theatre School; East London Arts & Music
- Occupations: Actress; singer; television presenter
- Years active: 2012–present
- Employer: BBC
- Television: Britain's Got Talent; Friday Download; Nova Jones; Strictly Come Dancing; EastEnders; Celebrity Race Across the World
- Partner(s): Tyler West (2023–present; engaged)
- Father: Dave Rainford

Molly Anne Rainford (born 22 November 2000) is an English actress, singer and television presenter. She was a finalist on the sixth series of Britain's Got Talent in 2012 and was one of the presenters on Friday Download between 2014 and 2015. She has since released two extended plays and has gone on to portray the titular character in the CBBC comedy drama series Nova Jones from 2021 onwards. In 2022, Rainford competed in the twentieth series of Strictly Come Dancing; she reached the final and finished as a runner-up. In 2023, she was cast in the BBC soap opera EastEnders as Anna Knight, as well as continuing to release music. In 2025, Rainford competed in the third series of Celebrity Race Across the World with her partner DJ Tyler West.

== Life and career ==
=== Early life and Britain's Got Talent ===
Molly Anne Rainford was born on 22 November 2000 in the London Borough of Havering. Her father is former Chelmsford City F.C. midfielder and assistant manager Dave Rainford and her family descends from Jamaica. In 2012, at the age of 11, she auditioned for the sixth series of Britain's Got Talent, singing her own version of Jennifer Hudson's "One Night Only" from the film Dreamgirls. She advanced to the semi-final stages where she sang "It Must Have Been Love" by Roxette; Rainford made it through to the final after finishing second in the public vote. In the final, she sang Beyoncé's version of "Ave Maria" and finished the competition in sixth place. Following the show, she was signed to Sony Music. Judge Simon Cowell also sponsored Rainford to attend Sylvia Young Theatre School. She later attended East London Arts & Music.

=== Television and music career ===
In 2014, Rainford joined the presenting team on the CBBC children's entertainment series Friday Download alongside Akai Osei and Bars and Melody, appearing as a presenter on the eighth and ninth series until the show's cancellation in 2015. In 2016, she appeared in an episode of CBBC's Millie Inbetween as Chloe. In 2021, Rainford began starring in the CBBC comedy drama Nova Jones, portraying the titular character, with the series focusing on the life and adventures of a galactic pop singer. The series was subsequently renewed for a second and third series.

In 2019, she released her debut extended play Commitment, which featured the songs "I Like You", "Long Run", "Forever and a Day", "How Many Times" and the titular single "Commitment", which has amassed over two million streams online. In 2020, she released a second EP, Christmas (Baby Please Come Home), which featured covers of Christmas songs including "Happy Xmas (War Is Over)", "Who Would Imagine a King", "I Wish It Could Be Christmas Everyday" and the title track. In 2022, Rainford was announced as a contestant on the twentieth series of Strictly Come Dancing. She finished as the runner-up alongside her professional partner Carlos Gu.

In March 2023, it was announced that she had been cast on the BBC soap opera EastEnders. Her character, Anna Knight, was brought in as a daughter in a family introduced as new owners of the fictional Queen Vic pub. She made her on-screen debut on 1 June 2023. She also released "My Heart's a Broken Record" with DJ Alex Kirsch as her first mainstream single.

== Filmography ==
Year	Title	Role	Notes
2012	This Morning	Herself	1 episode
2012	Britain's Got Talent	Herself	5 episodes
2012	Lorraine	Herself	2 episodes
2012, 2017	Britain’s Got More Talent	Herself	2 episodes
2014	Friday Download	Herself	Episode: "Molly Rainford, Anais Gallagher, Akai Osei, Julie Rogers & Pixie Lott"
2016	Millie Inbetween	Chloe	Episode: "Millie Goes Bad"
2017	Christmas Spirit	Molly	Short film
2021–2023	Nova Jones	Nova Jones	Main role
2022	Strictly Come Dancing	Contestant	Series 20 runner-up
2022	Strictly Come Dancing: It Takes Two	Contestant	16 episodes
2023–2025	EastEnders	Anna Knight	Regular role
2023	Children in Need	Herself	1 episode
2024	Richard Osman's House of Games	Herself	5 episodes
2024	The Weakest Link	Herself	Duos Special
2025	EastEnders: 40 Years on the Square	Herself	Interviewed guest
2025	Celebrity Race Across the World	Herself	With Tyler West

== Discography ==
=== Extended plays ===
Title	EP details
Commitment	Released: 4 October 2019; Label: Molly Rainford; Format: Digital download, streaming
Christmas (Baby Please Come Home)	Released: 27 November 2020; Label: Molly Rainford; Format: Digital download, streaming

=== Singles ===
Title	Year	Album
"Sign Your Name"	2019	Non-album singles
"My Heart Is a Broken Record" (with Alex Kirsch)	2023	Non-album singles

== Awards and nominations ==
Year	Ceremony	Category	Work	Result	Ref.
2023	I Talk Telly Awards	Best Soap Newcomer	EastEnders	Nominated	
2024	National Film Awards UK	Best Supporting Actress in a TV Series	EastEnders	Nominated	

== See also ==
- List of Britain's Got Talent finalists
- List of Strictly Come Dancing contestants
