= Episode 7037 and 7038 =

2024 EastEnders episodes

- EastEnders episodes
- Episode nos.: Episodes 7037 and 7038
- Directed by: Karl Nielson
- Written by: Simon Ashdown
- Editing by: Rob Platt
- Original air date: 25 December 2024
- Running time: 28 minutes (both)

Episode chronology
← Previous; Episode 7036	Next → Episode 7039

Episodes 7037 and 7038 of the British television soap opera EastEnders were originally broadcast on BBC One on 25 December 2024, Christmas Day. They were both directed by Karl Nielson, written by Simon Ashdown, edited by Rob Platt, and executive produced by Chris Clenshaw. The episodes primarily depict Lauren Branning's (Jacqueline Jossa) decision to reveal the affair between characters Cindy Beale (Michelle Collins) and her former stepson Junior Knight (Micah Balfour), resulting in their respective exclusion and Cindy's eventual attack. The episodes further develop the storylines of Phil Mitchell's (Steve McFadden) struggles with loneliness and depression, Stacey Slater's (Lacey Turner) desire to restart her romance with her ex-husband Martin Fowler (James Bye), the continuation of Denise Fox (Diane Parish) and Ravi Gulati's (Aaron Thiara) relationship, and the return of Nigel Bates (Paul Bradley).

The specials were written to pay homage to iconic past episodes, as a way of celebrating the show's upcoming 40th anniversary. Filmed in October and November 2024, the episodes marked the first time since 2008 that two half-hour episodes aired on Christmas Day, rather than a one-hour special. Production faced challenges, including a leaked script that revealed plot points surrounding an unnamed character's death, which were later returned to the BBC after receiving media coverage. The episodes received generally positive reviews from critics and audiences alike and received high viewership rating of over 5 million viewers, respectively.

== Plot ==
=== Episode 7037 ===
On Christmas Day 2024 in Walford, Cindy Beale (Michelle Collins) frantically searches for a missing USB stick containing a recording that exposes her affair with Junior Knight (Micah Balfour), the son of her ex-husband George (Colin Salmon). Cindy fears the recording will be played to her fiancé, Ian Beale (Adam Woodyatt). Lauren Branning (Jacqueline Jossa) reveals to Cindy that she has listened to the recording and plans to expose it as revenge for Cindy's prior attempts to get her addicted to painkillers while pregnant. Despite Cindy's desperate pleas and bribes, Lauren resolves to send the USB to Ian as part of the Beale and Knight families' Secret Santa. At the Mitchell household, Billy Mitchell (Perry Fenwick) and Honey Mitchell (Emma Barton) announce their plans to remarry in February 2025. Phil Mitchell (Steve McFadden) abruptly leaves the Mitchell family Christmas dinner after witnessing Teddy Mitchell (Roland Manookian) kiss his ex-wife Sharon Watts (Letitia Dean). While outside, Phil encounters his old friend Nigel Bates (Paul Bradley), who is struggling with poverty and estrangement from his family. Phil offers Nigel a place to stay for the night.

At the Slater house, Stacey Slater (Lacey Turner) tries to reconcile with her ex-husband Martin Fowler (James Bye), paranoid of his growing chemistry with Ruby Allen (Louisa Lytton). However, when she finally gets an opportunity to speak to him, Martin falls asleep before she can confess her desire to rekindle their relationship. Elsewhere, Ravi Gulati (Aaron Thiara) and Denise Fox (Diane Parish) rekindle their romance, sharing a kiss in the snow. During a karaoke night at The Queen Victoria pub, Ian receives the USB stick and plays it on the speakers. Lauren watches in delight as the recording plays, publicly exposing Cindy's affair with Junior, lingering feelings for George, and discontent with Ian to the crowded pub, leaving Ian and the onlookers shocked.

=== Episode 7038 ===
After the recording is played, a furious Ian attacks Junior. The pub's attendees are sent home as Ian retreats to another room to finish listening to the recording, while Cindy attempts to justify her actions to the Knights. Cindy's son and Lauren's partner Peter Beale (Thomas Law) chastises Lauren for causing a public scene. During the heated exchanges, it is revealed that Cindy and Junior manipulated George's autistic brother, Kojo (Dayo Koleosho), into keeping their affair secret after he witnessed them kissing. Cindy further reveals that Elaine knew about the recording and had used it to blackmail Cindy into emigrating to France with Ian, fearing Cindy's lingering feelings for George. George is appalled by Junior's actions and disowns him. When George accidentally refers to Cindy as his wife, he enrages Elaine, who kicks him out in response. Kojo apologizes for keeping the secret, but George reassures him that he is not to blame. Cindy faces a barrage of rejection from her children, Peter, Gina (Francesca Henry), and Anna (Molly Rainford), who disown her out of disgust.

In a private moment, Ian reveals to Cindy that he recently suffered an angina attack but chose not to tell her, fearing she would see him as weak. Cindy pleads for forgiveness, declaring her love and a desire to start anew, but Ian coldly dismisses her apologies. He concludes that she won't change and never truly loved him before forcing her to leave. Alone and shunned by her loved ones, Cindy finds herself standing in the cold of Albert Square. As she orders a taxi to leave Walford, she is violently struck down by an unseen figure with a snow shovel.

== Cast and characters ==
- Michelle Collins as Cindy Beale
- Adam Woodyatt as Ian Beale
- Micah Balfour as Junior Knight
- Colin Salmon as George Knight
- Harriet Thorpe as Elaine Knight
- Charlie Suff as Johnny Carter
- Dayo Koleosho as Kojo Asare
- Molly Rainford as Anna Knight
- Francesca Henry as Gina Knight
- Jacqueline Jossa as Lauren Branning
- Thomas Law as Peter Beale
- Gillian Taylforth as Kathy Cotton
- James Bye as Martin Fowler
- Louisa Lytton as Ruby Allen
- Lacey Turner as Stacey Slater
- Jessie Wallace as Kat Slater
- Shane Richie as Alfie Moon
- Bobby Brazier as Freddie Slater
- Laila Morse as Mo Harris
- Ross Boatman as Harvey Monroe
- Gillian Wright as Jean Slater
- Angela Wynter as Yolande Trueman
- Rudolph Walker as Patrick Trueman
- Tameka Empson as Kim Fox
- Delroy Atkinson as Howie Danes
- Jaden Ladega as Denzel Danes
- Zaraah Abrahams as Chelsea Fox
- Ellie Dadd as Amy Mitchell
- Kitty Castledine as Penny Branning
- Scott Maslen as Jack Branning
- Diane Parish as Denise Fox
- Aaron Thiara as Ravi Gulati
- Balvinder Sopal as Suki Panesar
- Heather Peace as Eve Unwin
- Emma Barton as Honey Mitchell
- Perry Fenwick as Billy Mitchell
- Freddie Phillips as Will Mitchell
- Jamie Borthwick as Jay Brown
- Elijah Holloway as Harry Mitchell
- Lewis Bridgeman as Barney Mitchell
- Laura Doddington as Nicola Mitchell
- Roland Manookian as Teddy Mitchell
- Letitia Dean as Sharon Watts
- Steve McFadden as Phil Mitchell
- Paul Bradley as Nigel Bates
- Michael French as David Wicks (Note: French appears in a voiceover cameo.)
- Jake McNally as Louie Beale
- Cody Briffett as Ernie Moon
- Elliot Briffett as Bert Moon
- Sonny Kendall as Tommy Moon
- Isabelle Smith as Hope Fowler
- Rocco Brenner as Arthur Fowler
- Lillia Turner as Lily Slater
- Isabella Brown as Lexi Pearce
- Grace as Janet Mitchell
- Frankie Day as Ricky Branning
- Michael Jose Pomares Calixte as Raymond Dawkins
- Maylo Miller as Mica Fox
- Arayah Harris-Buckle as Pearl Fox
- Harry Farr as Ollie Carter

== Production ==
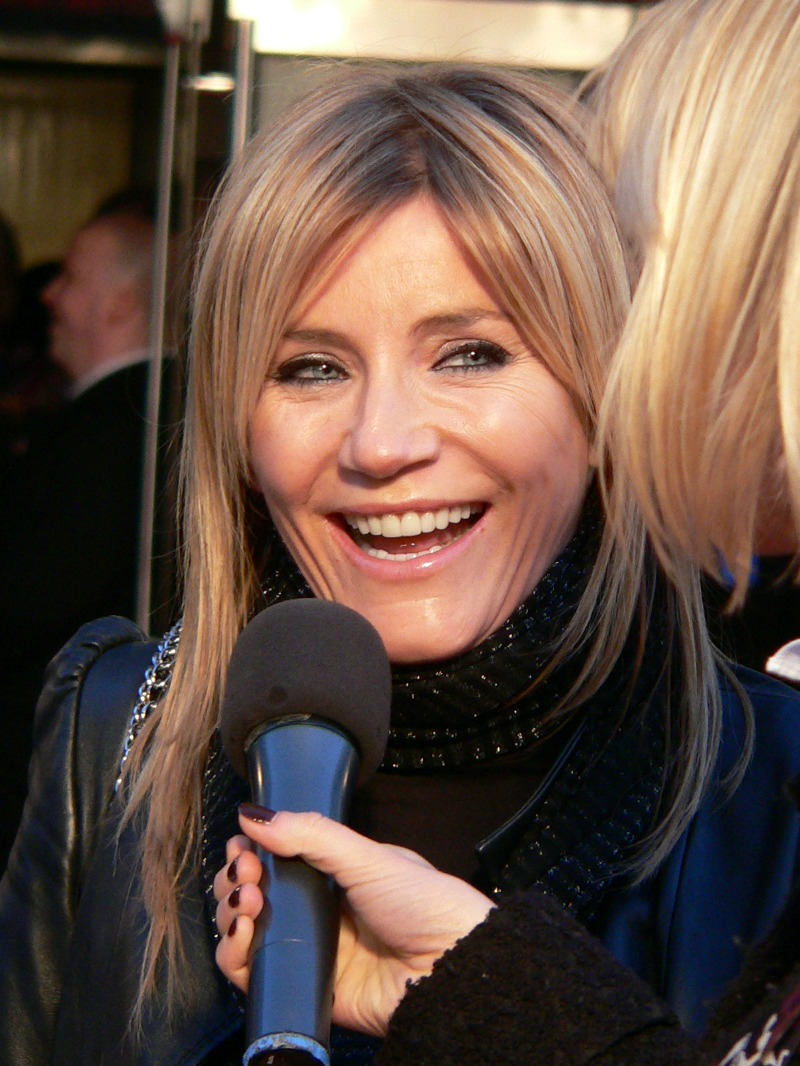
Michelle Collins, (pictured) portrayer of Cindy, likened the Christmas special to a "classic [EastEnders] Christmas".

In July 2024, EastEnders executive producer Chris Clenshaw confirmed that development for the soap's upcoming Christmas special had begun, with the episodes set to lend focus on the Mitchell family. In comparison to previous offerings, little plot information about the episodes was revealed to the press throughout the year, but they were billed as being "tragic and sad" by Alfie Moon actor Shane Richie. Set to focus on several ongoing storylines, Clenshaw compared preparing them to a tapestry, where "everything has to fit together". The first storyline confirmed to be at the forefront of Christmas was Phil Mitchell's (Steve McFadden) loneliness plot, with the character set be "in despair" and "face a very difficult festive period" after being isolated from his family. Clenshaw explained that although Phil was with his family at Christmas, he struggled with his mental health regardless, leading to the isolation.

It was later confirmed that the episodes would see the reveal of Cindy Beale's (Michelle Collins) affair with her former stepson Junior Knight (Micah Balfour). On the revelation of the affair, the episode was teased to feature "secrets and lies ... throw a wrecking ball into the Beale family festivities", and leave Cindy "nowhere to hide" as she faced fury from the Beale and Knight families. Later teasers also indicated that the former romance between Martin Fowler (James Bye) and Stacey Slater (Lacey Turner) would be explored, with Stacey wanting to resume their relationship. Throughout promotion for the episodes, it was frequently teased that it would feature "ghosts of Christmas past". On Christmas Eve, the return of former character Nigel Bates, played by Paul Bradley was aired. Speaking of his character's return, Bradley said he was "thrilled and honoured" to return as Nigel, a role he noted he still received recognition from. Clenshaw added: "There's a lot of mystery about Nigel's situation and why he's here alone, which will be revealed in the coming weeks". Clenshaw later confirmed to Digital Spy that Nigel's return stint would be long-running.

As EastEnders Christmas specials are known for their plot importance and dreary storylines, in an interview with Radio Times, actress Collins voiced her appreciation to be at the centre of "one of the most anticipated events", the Christmas special, billing is as being like "classic [EastEnders] Christmas episode[s]". When asked to describe it in three words: "dramatic, powerful and moving". Turner echoed Collins' sentiment, opining that "it's always lovely to be involved in the Christmas storyline". The show announced on 3 December 2024 that there would be two episodes to air on Christmas Day. The announcement marked the first time the soap had aired two half-hour episodes on Christmas since 2008, as all episodes had been hour-long specials since then. The first would air at 7:30pm and the second at 10:35pm, with neither being released early on BBC iPlayer like the show's other episodes.

Written by Simon Ashdown and directed by Karl Nielson, the episodes were filmed throughout October and November. A biodegradable false snow was used to dress the setting, which took over two days to apply. Clenshaw explained that the episode was written as a tribute to previous Christmas specials, intentionally incorporating homages to celebrate the show's upcoming 40th anniversary. He cited an example of being a scene where Ian Beale (Adam Woodyatt) smashes up a living room, in reference to a scene where Arthur Fowler (Bill Treacher) did the same on Christmas Day 1986. Clenshaw explained he wanted the scene to "have echoes of Arthur's breakdown", intentionally choreographing the scenes similarly. The show confirmed in a Behind the Scenes video that the scene where the affair was revealed referenced both the "Sharongate" storyline, with the recording being played in a crowded pub, and the show's 2007 Christmas Day broadcast, as the character Lauren Branning (Jacqueline Jossa) was responsible. Collins admitted she found it "tough" to film the scene where the affair is revealed, as she felt it meant having to deeply immerse into the moment. To film Cindy's attack, Collins was replaced with a stunt double who stood in place as another stunt man pretended to hit them with a real shovel. Collins then filmed Cindy's collapse.

On 11 November 2024, it was reported to media outlets that a script from the episodes was accidentally left on a train by one of the show's actresses. The scripts were found by a passenger on a Thameslink train at Elstree & Borehamwood railway station on 31 October. It was alleged that the scripts contained details about a "key character" being killed off. Shortly after being found, the individual tried returning them to the unnamed actress, but received no response after reaching out. After four days, the scripts were handed into The Sun newspaper before being returned to the BBC.

== Reception ==
The episodes performed well in the ratings, both securing places in the top ten most-viewed Christmas Day broadcasts. Episode 7037 was watched by 4 million and episode 7038 was watched by 4.4 million, beating out rival soaps Coronation Street and Emmerdale. The viewership figure increased by 800,000 viewers compared to 2023's special. Consolidated viewing figures collected by Broadcasters' Audience Research Board found the episodes receiving ratings of 5.5 million and 5.6 million, respectively.

Helen Daly of Radio Times wrote that the episodes had successfully provided drama in "bucket loads", and expressed sympathy for Cindy by calling Lauren's revenge "cruel" and Cindy's attack "horrific". Daly further praised Elaine's decision to kick George out, calling it "powerful". Colleague Lewis Knight called the affair reveal "explosive". A BBC Media Centre writer deemed the scene "sensational". Erin Zammitt of Digital Spy found that, despite initial concern about the show's decision to dedicate Christmas to Cindy and Junior's affair, that the soap had "produced a brilliantly entertaining Christmas instalment", which appealed well to all. Zammitt enthused about the parallels to previous Christmas instalments in the episode, namely Lauren exposing an affair via a recording, like she did in 2007 with her father Max Branning (Jake Wood) and Stacey. Despite the praise, she criticised the subplots in the episode for "[falling] by the wayside" and Cindy's eventual attack for being too predictable. Zammitt predicted that Cindy's fate was "likely to divide viewers", but ultimately defended the decision as it gave the story an "exciting climax". She concluded that the episode was fun for those who wanted to watch "Christmas Day drama" and fans of the show, with "powerhouse showdowns" between characters. Simon Duke of the Evening Chronicle commented that the episodes "had ... viewers on the edge of their seats" and Cindy's attack left viewers "fearing the worst".
