= EastEnders 40th Anniversary Week =

Special week of episodes of EastEnders in 2025

- EastEnders episodes
- EastEnders viewers voted for Denise Fox to resume her relationship with Jack Branning over Ravi Gulati.
- Episode nos.: Episodes 7068–7072
- Directed by: Lance Kneeshaw
- Written by: Bryan Kirkwood; Simon Ashdown; Kevin Rundle; Lauren Klee
- Original air date: 17–20 February 2025
- Running time: 150 minutes (3x30; 1x60)

Guest appearances
- Ross Kemp as Grant Mitchell; Anita Dobson as Angie Watts

Episode chronology
| ← Previous; Episode 7067 | Next → Episode 7073 |

EastEnders 40th Anniversary Week is a group of five episodes of the BBC soap opera EastEnders, broadcast on BBC One. Devised to celebrate the programme's 40th anniversary, the episodes were broadcast on each day from 17 to 20 February 2025, including a double episode on 19 February and a live episode on 20 February. During the episodes, which take place over the course of Billy (Perry Fenwick) and Honey Mitchell's (Emma Barton) wedding, Phil Mitchell (Steve McFadden) attempts suicide, Cindy Beale (Michelle Collins) learns that Kathy Cotton (Gillian Taylforth) was the culprit of her attack on the previous Christmas, Denise Fox (Diane Parish) chooses to rekindle her relationship with Jack Branning (Scott Maslen) over Ravi Gulati (Aaron Thiara), and Sonia Fowler (Natalie Cassidy) gives birth to a baby girl, Julia. The episodes also feature the Queen Victoria public house explosion, resulting in the deaths of Martin Fowler (James Bye) and Reiss Colwell (Jonny Freeman).

The episodes were directed by Lance Kneeshaw and produced by Chris Clenshaw. Bryan Kirkwood and Simon Ashdown respectively wrote the first two episodes on 17 and 18 February, whilst Kevin Rundle wrote the hour-long episode broadcast on 19 February. The live episode, the show's fourth overall and first since 2015, was written by Lauren Klee. After Bye told Clenshaw he planned to leave his role as Martin, Clenshaw decided to incorporate his departure into the live episode as Martin was an important character in the show's history. In a first for the show, viewers had an interactive role, as they were given the opportunity to choose which man Denise chooses to pursue a relationship with, out of Jack and Ravi. They were also given the choice of the name Sonia chooses for her daughter, between Julia and Toni, both names referring to the show's creators Julia Smith and Tony Holland. The results of both votes were revealed in the live episode, turning out to be Jack and Julia, respectively. To promote the anniversary, two documentaries were released that covered the show's history and cast members made appearances in other media.

The episodes were a ratings success, all receiving more than four million viewers and ranked in the week's top fifteen highest-viewed broadcasts. Critics praised Anita Dobson's cameo appearance as Angie Watts, the conclusion to Phil's mental health storyline, Bye and Lacey Turner's performances, Martin's death scene, and the lack of technical errors in the live broadcast; however, it did receive some criticism for being unrealistic.

== Plot ==
=== Episode 7068 (17 February 2025) ===
As Billy (Perry Fenwick) and Honey Mitchell (Emma Barton) celebrate their second wedding, the residents of Albert Square gather for the occasion. However, Billy's cousin Phil Mitchell's (Steve McFadden) struggles with depression and suicidal ideation persist, though he masks his pain in front of his brother, Grant (Ross Kemp). When Nigel Bates (Paul Bradley) raises concerns about Phil's mental state, Grant dismisses them. As Phil arranges suicide notes addressed to his loved ones, he is interrupted by his granddaughter, Lexi Pearce (Isabella Brown), who asks for help writing a wedding speech. Meanwhile, Cindy Beale (Michelle Collins) remains adamant that her ex-husband Ian (Adam Woodyatt) was behind her attack on Christmas Day 2024. Her obsession with finding the truth leads her to cause a scene at the wedding reception in the Queen Victoria public house, resulting in her being thrown out. Desperate for revenge and fearful of her safety, she asks Phil for a gun, but he refuses. Unbeknownst to him, she later steals it from his safe. Later, Cindy breaks into the Beale family home in search of proof of Ian's guilt. There, she encounters an unseen figure holding her missing locket that she lost on the night of her attack, and promptly raises the stolen gun in their direction.

=== Episode 7069 (18 February 2025) ===
Ian is found holding Cindy's locket but denies attacking her. His mother Kathy Cotton (Gillian Taylforth) then arrives and reveals that she was Cindy's attacker, blaming Cindy for negatively impacting Ian's life. A struggle ensues over the gun, resulting in Ian being shot in the arm. Cindy flees and hands the gun to Phil. Meanwhile, Linda Carter (Kellie Bright) discovers Phil's suicide notes and enlists Grant and Nigel to help find him. They track him to The Arches, where they break in and find him preparing to take his own life with the gun. Elsewhere, Martin Fowler (James Bye) struggles with his feelings for both his ex-wife Stacey Slater (Lacey Turner) and current partner Ruby Allen (Louisa Lytton). Stacey confesses her love, but Martin rejects her. Meanwhile, Reiss Colwell (Jonny Freeman), on the run for murder, breaks into Bianca Jackson's (Patsy Palmer) home. She catches him, but he escapes. As Reiss attempts to flee, Cindy shoves Ian into his path, causing him to swerve and crash into The Queen Vic. The impact ignites nearby gas canisters, resulting in an explosion that collapses the pub's roof. George Knight (Colin Salmon) rescues Reiss from the wreckage and he escapes again.

=== Episode 7070/7071 (19 February 2025) ===
Everyone inside the pub survives the explosion, and survivors inside escape through a shattered window. Martin helps several people out, but stays behind to try and rescue Stacey, who is trapped under debris in the bathroom. At the garage, Phil attempts to end his life but finds the gun is empty. Grant, overwhelmed by Phil's state, leaves to assist in the rescue efforts. Linda stays with Phil while Nigel convinces him to seek medical help, revealing that he has been secretly suffering from early-onset dementia. Firefighters arrive to secure the pub while the police continue searching for Reiss. Inside, Kathy, who was trapped under the bar with Cindy, escapes and pulls her to safety. Cindy, severely injured, is taken to the hospital. Martin rescues Stacey, but they are soon trapped by more debris. Sharon Watts (Letitia Dean), whom nobody has realised is trapped on the staircase, has a vision of her deceased adoptive mother Angie (Anita Dobson) before Grant finds her and saves her. Meanwhile, cousins Lauren Branning (Jacqueline Jossa) and Sonia Fowler (Natalie Cassidy), both pregnant, are stuck in the kitchen as Sonia goes into labour. Bianca joins them and assists with the birth until Reiss, injured but desperate, blocks their escape. A struggle ensues with Bianca pushing him into a wall, causing the top floor to collapse with Reiss being crushed to death by a falling bathtub. Martin confesses his love to Stacey before the roof caves in, crushing his legs under a large beam.

=== Episode 7072 (20 February 2025, Live) ===
Trapped under the beam, Martin shouts in agony as Stacey desperately tries to lift it. Lauren finds towels to wrap the baby in, while Bianca helps Sonia give birth. The baby is unresponsive at first, but Sonia revives her, breaking down in relief when she finally hears her daughter's cries. Outside, Linda encourages Denise, who is torn between pursuing a relationship with Jack Branning (Scott Maslen) or Ravi Gulati (Aaron Thiara), to choose the man who makes her happiest. Denise chooses Jack and they decide to give their marriage another chance. Survivors gather outside the pub to wait for news and encourage those who remain trapped. Inside, Martin confesses he never truly loved Ruby and proposes to Stacey, who accepts. As they dream of a fresh start away from Walford, medics warn Stacey that Martin is suffering from crush syndrome. Sonia, Lauren, and Bianca escape, and Sonia names her daughter Julia as Phil is admitted to a mental health hospital. When the firefighters lift the beam, Martin suffers a cardiac arrest and dies, despite paramedics' attempt to revive him. Stacey's anguished cries are heard by onlookers, leaving Ruby devastated.

== Cast and characters ==
- Louisa Lytton as Ruby Allen
- Dayo Koleosho as Kojo Asare
- Matthew James Morrison as Felix Baker
- Paul Bradley as Nigel Bates
- Michelle Collins as Cindy Beale
- Adam Woodyatt as Ian Beale
- Jake McNally as Louie Beale
- Thomas Law as Peter Beale
- Scott Maslen as Jack Branning
- Jacqueline Jossa as Lauren Branning
- Kitty Castledine as Penny Branning
- Frankie Day as Ricky Branning
- Jamie Borthwick as Jay Brown
- Charlie Suff as Johnny Carter
- Kellie Bright as Linda Carter
- Maggie Daniels as Celebrant
- Jonny Freeman as Reiss Colwell
- Gillian Taylforth as Kathy Cotton
- Michael Jose Pomares Calixte as Raymond Dawkins
- Jaden Ladega as Denzel Danes
- Delroy Atkinson as Howie Danes
- Rocco Brenner as Arthur Fowler
- James Bye as Martin Fowler
- Natalie Cassidy as Sonia Fowler
- Zaraah Abrahams as Chelsea Fox
- Diane Parish as Denise Fox
- Tameka Empson as Kim Fox
- Arayah Harris-Buckle as Pearl Fox
- Juhaim Rasul Choudhury as Davinder "Nugget" Gulati
- Aaron Thiara as Ravi Gulati
- Laila Morse as Mo Harris
- Tony Clay as Callum Highway
- Grace Cookey-Gam as Trish Holloway
- James Farrar as Zack Hudson
- Patsy Palmer as Bianca Jackson
- Molly Rainford as Anna Knight
- Harriet Thorpe as Elaine Knight
- Colin Salmon as George Knight
- Francesca Henry as Gina Knight
- Micah Balfour as Junior Knight
- Ellie Dadd as Amy Mitchell
- Lewis Bridgeman as Barney Mitchell
- Perry Fenwick as Billy Mitchell
- Ross Kemp as Grant Mitchell
- Elijah Holloway as Harry Mitchell
- Emma Barton as Honey Mitchell
- Grace as Janet Mitchell
- Laura Doddington as Nicola Mitchell
- Steve McFadden as Phil Mitchell
- Roland Manookian as Teddy Mitchell
- Freddie Phillips as Will Mitchell
- Ross Boatman as Harvey Monroe
- Shane Richie as Alfie Moon
- Elliot Briffett as Bert Moon
- Cody Briffett as Ernie Moon
- Sonny Kendall as Tommy Moon
- Aaliyah James as Avani Nandra-Hart
- Sophie Khan Levy as Priya Nandra-Hart
- Shiv Jalota as Vinny Panesar
- Heather Peace as Eve Panesar-Unwin
- Balvinder Sopal as Suki Panesar-Unwin
- Christopher Birks as Paramedic
- Isabella Brown as Lexi Pearce
- Luke Baker as Paramedic Skinner
- Bobby Brazier as Freddie Slater
- Gillian Wright as Jean Slater
- Jessie Wallace as Kat Slater
- Lillia Turner as Lily Slater
- Lacey Turner as Stacey Slater
- Lesley Harcount as Samantha Tavernier
- Clair Norris as Bernadette Taylor
- Jane Slaughter as Tracey
- Rudolph Walker as Patrick Trueman
- Angela Wynter as Yolande Trueman
- Arthur Gentleman as Albie Watts
- Anita Dobson as Angie Watts
- Letitia Dean as Sharon Watts

== Production ==
=== Origins ===
In an interview with Digital Spy in October 2023, EastEnders' executive producer Chris Clenshaw confirmed that production for a 40th anniversary celebration for the soap was underway. During creation, Clenshaw cited the theme of community pushing through hardship as a key topic for the week. On 9 September 2024, the BBC announced that the show would broadcast a live episode to celebrate the occasion. The episode would be part of a "special week" of episodes to celebrate the milestone. This would be the fourth occasion of a live broadcast for the soap, and the eighth individual episode to be broadcast live. The episode also marked the serial's first one in ten years; with the last incident being a special live week in 2015 for the conclusion of the "Who Killed Lucy Beale?" storyline. The air date was set for February 2025, with the episode to be filmed and broadcast from the BBC Elstree Centre. The upcoming episode was also set to be the first interactive episode in the show's history, as viewers would be able to vote on the outcome of a storyline. Clenshaw said that the 40th anniversary would be a "milestone event" for the soap. Clenshaw disclosed that the episode had been planned for weeks prior to the announcement and kept details of the episode's plot a tight secret, but promised viewers it would be "full of drama and surprises" and "an unmissable week full of shocking twists that will change Albert Square, and the lives of those who live in it, forever".

=== Cast ===
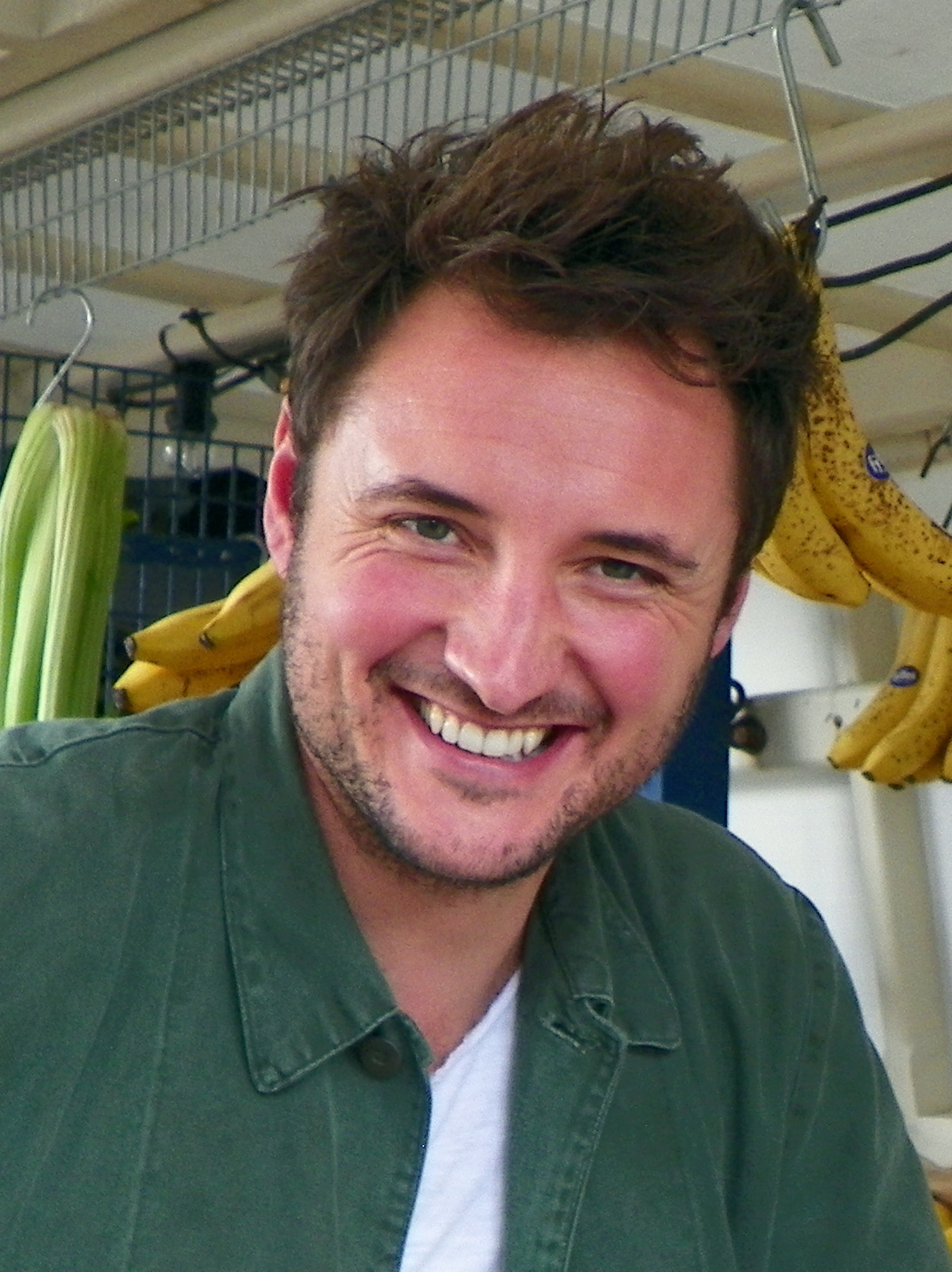
After James Bye (pictured) decided to leave his role as Martin Fowler, Clenshaw decided that Martin would die in the live episode.

Upon the announcement, Clenshaw addressed that the show had begun bringing characters back for stints and promised more to build up to the week of the anniversary. Shortly before, it was reported that actress Louisa Lytton would be returning to her role as Ruby Allen after three years of absence. In December 2024, it was announced that the anniversary would feature a return of Paul Bradley as Nigel Bates after more than 26 years. The trend of returning characters continued when it was confirmed that Ross Kemp was returning to his role as Grant Mitchell for a short stint covering the anniversary, in which he was teased to play a "significant role". In an unannounced surprise, Anita Dobson reprised her role as Angie Watts on the 19 February episode, a cameo appearance 37 years after the character's departure.

After James Bye told Clenshaw that he wanted to leave his role as Martin Fowler, Clenshaw decided that the character had earned a significant, dramatic exit as Martin was the first character to be born on-screen, so decided to have the character killed off in the live episode. Cast members expressed mixed emotions towards filming a live broadcast. At the 29th National Television Awards, cast members Diane Parish and Scott Maslen were asked about the upcoming anniversary. As both had starred in previous live episodes for the soap, Parish admitted she was "a bit terrified" to do another one while Maslen, having incorrectly delivered a line in the 25th anniversary live episode, expressed stress. Jacqueline Jossa voiced excitement to film another, opining: "there are many things that EastEnders does well and a live episode is definitely one of them". Perry Fenwick said he was "terrified" to feature in a live broadcast, having exclusively worked on EastEnders for years. Harriet Thorpe commented that "everyone [was] anxious" to record a live episode, but called it "thrilling and exciting" due to her past theatre experience. Adam Woodyatt recalled that after the cast read the scripts for the first time, the cast's collective feeling was a bewildered "what the fuck?" as they were unsure how the live element would be filmed. Jessie Wallace's character Kat Slater was absent from the week in the first three episodes; she later returned during the live episode, explaining that she had been out of town for a few hours.

=== Choice ===
On 6 January 2025, it was announced that the previously teased interactive element would give the viewers the choice of who the character Denise Fox would decide to pursue a romantic relationship with. The choice was between Denise's estranged ex-husband Jack Branning and her "secret lover" Ravi Gulati. Clenshaw expressed excitement to give viewers the opportunity to choose, as well as to see which suitor would win the vote. Clenshaw, who has been recognised for attempting to appeal EastEnders to a younger audience during his tenure, incorporated the twist to appeal to Generation Z, explaining: "They watch reality TV, they've grown up with video games, they're used to being involved in the narrative". He has also stated that the interactive element was incorporated as a "gift" for consistent viewers. It was confirmed that the choice's outcome would be revealed during the live episode, with a scene set to depict Denise knocking on the door of the chosen man. Parish voiced appreciation for the choice being centred on a woman.

The vote opened on 19 February 2025, following the respective episode's conclusion, and remained open from 8:30 pm to 7:10 pm the following day, closing only twenty minutes before the live episode's airing. To vote, audiences had to answer a poll on the BBC website. After being independently verified, Clenshaw would discard the script that lost. It was teased on 31 January 2025 that as well as voting for Denise's partner, viewers would also be given another vote to decide a development in a story. This choice was later revealed to be the choice of name for Sonia Fowler's baby daughter, with viewers being given the options of Julia and Toni, after the show's creators Julia Smith and Tony Holland, respectively. The results of each vote were revealed in the live episode, as it depicted Denise rekindling her romance with Jack and Sonia naming her newborn daughter Julia.

=== Promotion ===
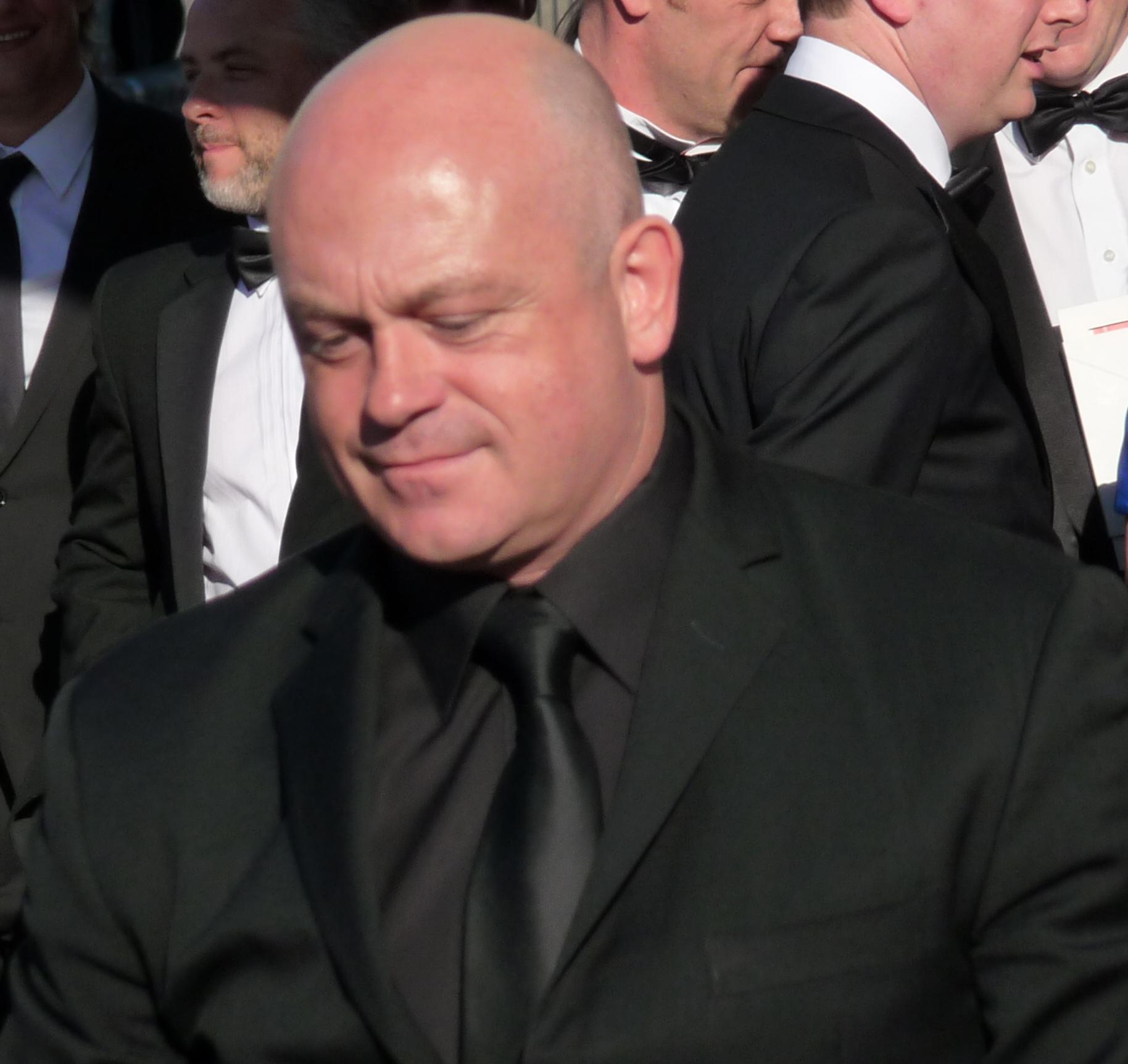
In addition to returning as his character Grant, Ross Kemp (pictured) partook in several promotional efforts for the anniversary week.

It was confirmed that Kemp would host a special one-off documentary for the celebration, including interviews with both former and current stars of the show. Titled EastEnders: 40 Years on The Square, the documentary was set to "revisit some of the show's most poignant and ground-breaking storylines" and interview guests ranged from long-running present actors such as Adam Woodyatt, Gillian Taylforth and Letitia Dean to "iconic" former stars Anita Dobson and Pam St Clement, who portrayed characters Angie Watts and Pat Butcher, respectively. The special aired on BBC One at 8:00 pm on 17 February. It was later announced that the show would revive spin-off documentary series EastEnders: Revealed, which originally aired in the 1990s and 2000s and lent focus on popular EastEnders characters and storylines, to tease events taking place across the week. Titled EastEnders Revealed: The Lock-In, it was hosted by former EastEnders actor Joe Swash and broadcast for forty-five minutes on BBC Three at 8:00 pm on 18 February. Guest stars for the special included EastEnders actresses Natalie Cassidy, Jacqueline Jossa, and Patsy Palmer, as well as a musical performance from a secret celebrity "EastEnders superfan".

As a method of promotion, cast members made appearances on other television shows. Former stars Max Bowden and Danielle Harold appeared on a Celebrity Antiques Road Trip episode together which was filmed in the Cotswolds. Actor Shaun Williamson hosted a BBC archive special to recap some of the show's best musical moments. Kemp hosted a special episode of his game show Bridge of Lies which saw Micah Balfour, Michelle Collins, Molly Rainford, and Woodyatt compete. An Antiques Roadshow episode took place on the show's set. Kemp reflected on the "Sharongate" storyline in Ross Kemp Remembers... Sharongate, St Clement reflected on a storyline seeing Pat begin an affair with Frank Butcher (Mike Reid) Pam St Clement Remembers... Pat and Frank's affair, and Rudolph Walker and Angela Wynter reflected on a two-hander episode their characters starred in together in Angela Wynter and Rudolph Walker Remember... Yolande and Patrick's two-hander episode. Kemp appeared on CBeebies in a segment which featured him reading a bedtime story, The Squirrels Who Squabbled by Rachel Bright and Jim Field, on the show's set. These were accompanied by several reruns of old episodes and old specials related to the show.

=== Filming and rehearsals ===
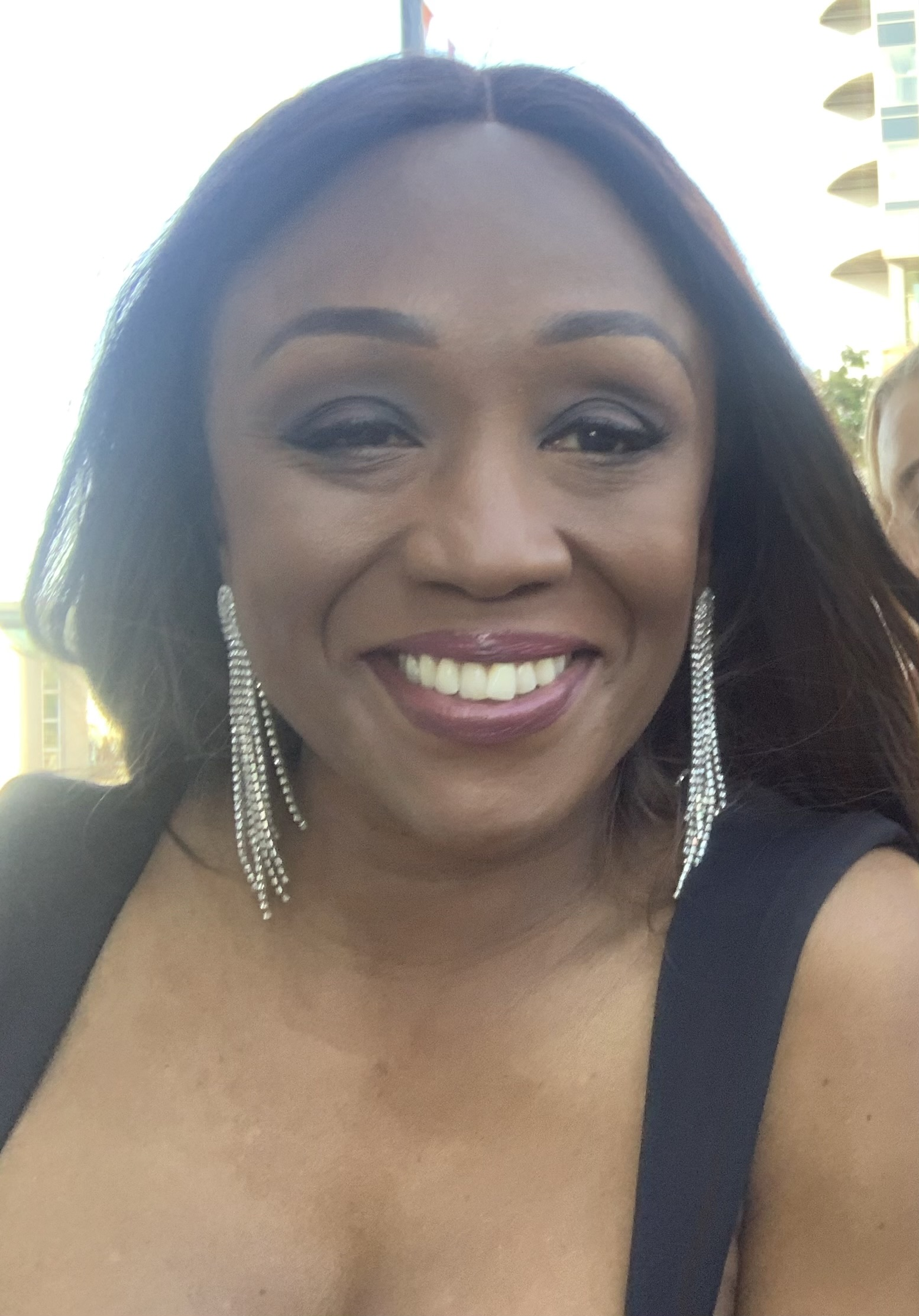
To accommodate the viewers' choice, Diane Parish (pictured) rehearsed scenes portraying both outcomes.

Scenes depicting Billy and Honey's wedding were filmed inside a large tent indoors to prevent equipment from getting wet. Honey's wedding dress was adorned with pearls and sequins by the show's wardrobe department to reflect her characterisation. Palmer performed her own stunts during the scene showing Bianca chase a speeding Reiss in his car. Freeman was replaced with a stunt double for wide shots showing the car driving through the set. To film the scene depicting Cindy pushing Ian in front of the car, Collins filmed a shot pushing Woodyatt onto a stunt mattress, and an equivalent one pushing his stunt double onto the bare road. Stunt coordinator Lee Sheward explained that to portray Reiss's car crashing into The Queen Victoria public house, a hidden metal post that was attached to a plate bolted into the ground was installed to stop it from crashing into the set. As a backup, a 16-millimetre cable was also attached to the back of the car. The car was driving at more than 20 miles per hour to film the stunt. Computer-generated imagery was not incorporated to create fire in the episode, as Sheward explained that a bar that emitted real fire and was connected to tubes was used. To film the explosion of The Queen Vic, ten litres of fuel were used on set, and air mortars were placed inside the pub's windows to push the glass out. Real glass was used to film the scene, as opposed to sugar glass. Filming for the first three non-live episodes, including the explosion of The Queen Vic, concluded in December 2024.

Planning for the live episode commenced on 24 November 2024. For the live episode, cast and production performed three stages of rehearsals; beginning with staging rehearsals, which involve planning character locations during the broadcast, then rehearsing with the cast, technology and lighting, before finally beginning dress rehearsals. The cast performed a read-through together on 3 February before beginning. During dress rehearsals for the episode, both outcomes of the viewer's decision were practiced, as Parish performed scenes with Maslen and Thiara. On the day of the live broadcast, the cast performed a run-through of the episode on-set with radio microphones in preparation. As the exterior of The Queen Vic had been covered up by black tarp during filming of the aftermath episodes, footage of the charred exterior and debris from December 2024 was digitally overlaid in real-time with the live camera feed of the cast standing directly outside. Sonia's baby daughter was mostly portrayed by a prop baby being held in Cassidy's arms, as it was not safe to have a real baby on the smoke-filled set. For Sonia's final monologue to her daughter on an ambulance, two mothers were filmed carrying their real-life babies, following along with Cassidy's live movements in carrying the prop baby as the episode intercut between the shots.

=== Broadcast ===
It was confirmed that on the episode broadcast on the day of the show's 40th anniversary, 19 February 2025, an hour-long episode would be broadcast, with a thirty-minute live episode airing the following day, 20 February 2025. The other two episodes were also thirty minutes. The four episodes broke the show's usual practice of uploading episodes on BBC iPlayer at 6:00 am before broadcast. 17 February, and 18 February were the show's 7,068th and 7,069th episodes, respectively. 19 February, the hour-long episode, was the show's 7,070th and 7,071st episode. 20 February, the live episode, was the show's 7,072nd episode. All four episodes began their broadcast at 7:30 pm.

The live episode was broadcast from BBC Elstree Centre. It had considerably fewer errors than the show's previous attempts at live broadcasting, as no actors made mistakes delivering lines. It was observed that Sonia's baby was clearly a doll in some scenes, there were a few moments of crowds having "awkward silences", and the actors portraying firemen were seen doing little other than shining torches at debris inside The Queen Vic. A moment when Linda says "tits-up" when talking to Denise caused fans to wonder if the character was supposed to say it or if actress Bright made a mistake delivering the line; however, Bright confirmed that the line was in the script. Bright also said that in the same scene, the script directed her to flip a coin, but she pushed back against it fearing that she would drop it. Her alternate suggestion that Denise stop Linda before she tosses the coin made it into the final episode. In an interview, Bye revealed that he made a small mistake during the broadcast but that Turner's response to it covered it up, though he did not reveal what it was.

== Reception ==
=== Pre-broadcast ===
The decision to reintroduce Kemp as Grant was met with a mixed response. Frances Ryan of The Guardian praised the decision, calling it "brilliant", writing that she found "something oddly comforting" about the show's trend of reintroducing past characters and that it reflected the broader resurgence of 90s nostalgia in popular culture. Pat Stacey of the Irish Independent disagreed, arguing that the decision to write the return was "desperation, not inspiration" as he opined that Grant's original introduction incited a continuing decline in quality for the soap. Stacey continued by expressing confusion towards the excitement of media outlets surrounding the character's return, arguing that the character's antecedent 2016 stint was relatively recent. Martin's demise was predicted by Radio Times writer Laura Denby, who saw it coming as a result of the character's sharp increase in screen time leading up to the anniversary, his status as the first character to be born on the show, hints in storylines, and the fact that his death would mark the second time a love interest of Stacey's died on an anniversary, as her previous husband Bradley Branning died during the show's 25th anniversary. ATV Today reported that bookmakers' odds predicted that Reiss was the most likely character to die during the explosion. He was followed by Martin, Ruby, Sonia, and Cindy.

=== Ratings ===
According to Broadcast, 18 February and 19 February pulled in overnight viewership of 2.8 million and 3.4 million, respectively. According to overnight ratings, the live episode was watched by an average of 3.7 million people, around 1.5 million more than the soap's daily average. Although deemed a success, it was lower than the show's previous Christmas specials, and considerably lower than the show's previous live broadcasts. Figures collected by the Broadcasters Audience Research Board showed that all four episodes were in the fifteen highest-watched television broadcasts in the week from 17 to 23 February. The organisation's consolidated viewing figures revealed that the 17 February episode was viewed by a total of 4.44 million people. The episode on 18 February received 4.84 million viewers. 19 February received 4.83 million viewers. The live episode on 20 February was watched by 5.20 million people.

=== Critical reception ===
Dobson's return as Angie was well-received by Radio Times writer Lewis Knight, who called it a "tearjerker" and a "wonderful surprise". He also praised the scene for its setting, the significance of the character's appearance, the advice she gives to Sharon, and the writing and direction from Rundle and Kneeshaw for effectively capturing the character's speech patterns and mannerisms. He compared the scene to a 2016 scene which depicted the character Peggy Mitchell (Barbara Windsor) seeing a vision of Pat in her final appearance. The continuation and ultimate conclusion of Phil's depression storyline received positive reception. Stefania Sarrubba of Digital Spy wrote that the conclusion "packed an emotional punch". Knight called it "moving", praised the scene where Nigel reveals his depression, and presented similar audience responses to the scene on Twitter.

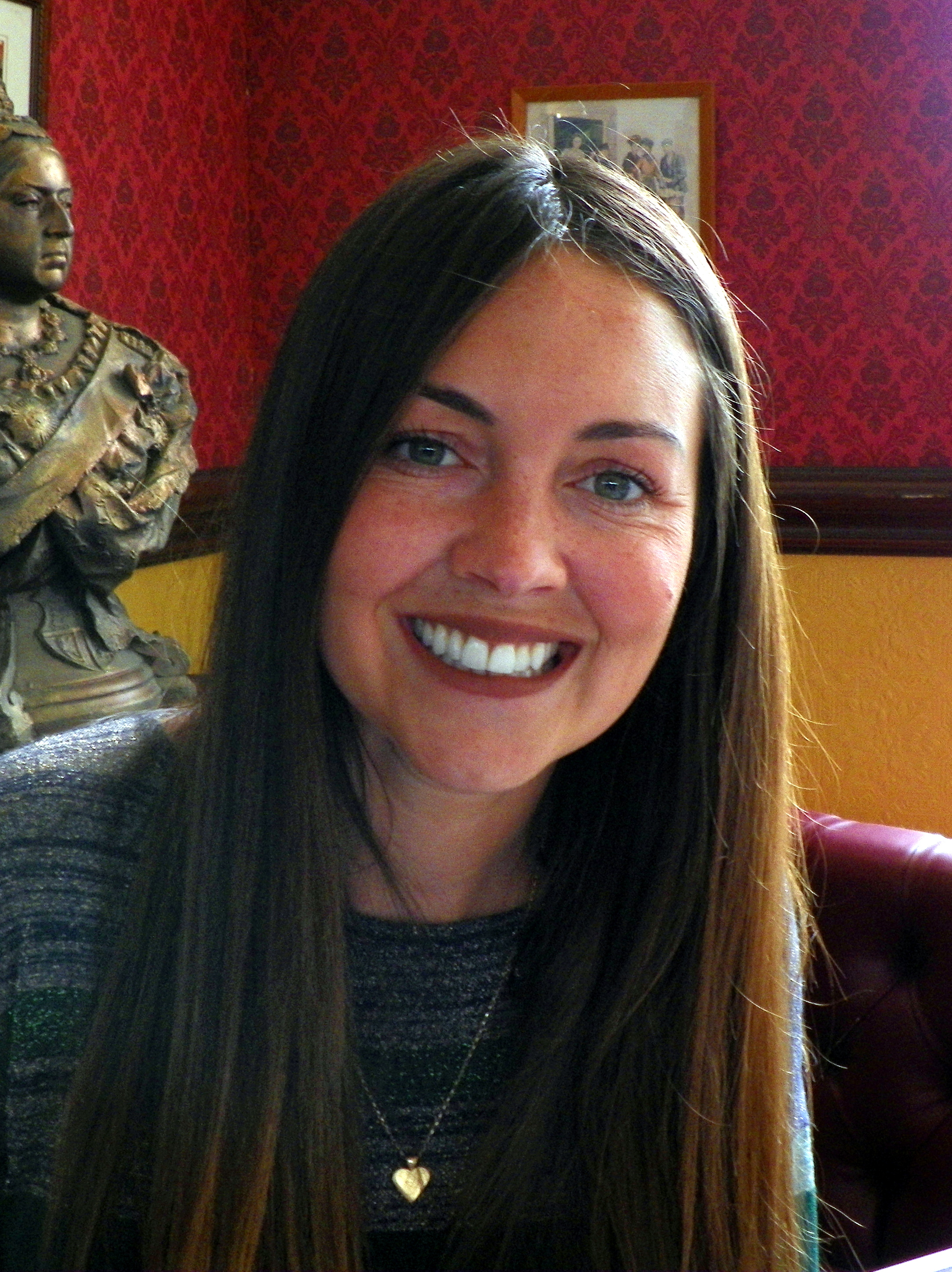
Lacey Turner (pictured) received praise for her portrayal of Stacey Slater in the live episode.

In a review of the live episode, The Guardian critic Stuart Heritage called it the show's best attempt at a live broadcast, due to few technical issues and strong performances from the cast. However, he criticised the episode for being disjointed from the remainder of the week and disagreed with the viewers' decision to pair Denise with Jack, criticising it for being underwhelming. He added that the episode was "unmemorable" and character reactions to the episode's events, such as the explosion of The Queen Victoria and Sonia going into labour, were too mild. George Lewis of Digital Spy called Martin's death "devastating." Johnathon Hughes of The i Paper rated the live episode 5 out of 5, describing it as "half an hour of nerve-jangling drama". He praised the cast in general for the lack of mistakes, but particularly praised Turner's portrayal of Stacey, and opined that the viewers voted correctly on both decisions, concluding that show creator Julia Smith "would've been proud of what they achieved". Turner's performance was declared "heart-wrenching" by Edinburgh Live writer Daniel Bird. Michael Hogan of The Daily Telegraph rated the episode 4 out of 5, praising the lack of bloopers, Martin and Stacey's "tender" scenes together, Turner's performance given her recent birth, and Clenshaw's role in finishing his tenure on the show with "ambition and aplomb". He called the live episode a "technical triumph", though expressed discontent with the viewers' decision to pair Denise with Jack. Carol Midgely of The Times rated it 4 out of 5, praising the lack of errors in the episode.

James Hibbs of the Radio Times called Martin's death "a huge moment" for the show's history, and the most tragic part of the week. Colleague Helen Daly called Martin's death scene "cruel", but opined that the episode as a whole was "gripping". Writing for Digital Spy, Laura Denby defended the show's decision to kill Martin off, as it made the episode more memorable. She added that his scenes with Stacey were well-acted and written, and that the week as a whole left viewers with "endless anticipation". Discussing Phil's mental health storyline, she commented that it was "beautifully" portrayed by McFadden. Concluding, she opined that the week as a whole proved the show's "magic [was] still very much alive". Ellie Muir of The Independent commented that viewers were left "heartbroken" by Martin's demise. Billy Weir of the Belfast Telegraph left a negative review of the week, criticising it for being overly zany.
