= Cindy Beale =

Fictional character from EastEnders

- EastEnders character
- Portrayed by: Michelle Collins
- Duration: 1988–1990, 1992–1998, 2023–present
- First appearance: Episode 340; 10 May 1988
- Introduced by: Julia Smith (1988); Leonard Lewis (1992); Jane Harris (1997); Chris Clenshaw (2023)
- Spin-off appearances: The Ghosts of Ian Beale (2014)
In-universe information
- Other names: Cindy Williams; Rose Sawyer; Rose Knight
- Occupation: Market trader Businesswoman; Barmaid; Restaurant owner Bar owner
- Family: Beale/Branning
- Father: Tom Williams
- Mother: Bev Williams
- Sisters: Gina Williams
- Husband: Ian Beale (1989–1997); George Knight (offscreen, 1999–2014); Max Branning (2026–present)
- Sons: Steven Beale; Peter Beale
- Daughters: Lucy Beale; Cindy Williams; Gina Knight; Anna Knight
- Stepsons: Junior Knight; Oscar Branning
- Stepdaughters: Lauren Branning; Annie Carter
- Grandsons: Louie Beale; Jimmy Beale
- Granddaughters: AJ Branning; Beth Williams
- Aunts: Pam

Cindy Beale (also Williams) is a fictional character from the BBC soap opera EastEnders, portrayed by Michelle Collins. She first appeared 10 May 1988 and originally departed on 27 December 1990, before returning for a second stint from 13 October 1992 until her exit on 10 April 1998. The character supposedly died off-screen on 5 November 1998. However, in 2023 the character was "resurrected" with Collins returning after 25 years on 21 June 2023 ahead of a permanent return on 22 August.

During her first stint on the show, Cindy embarked on a prolonged relationship with her would-be husband Ian Beale (Adam Woodyatt). Their marriage soon deteriorated, however, due to Cindy's selfish streak that shows the character becoming unfaithful to Ian and growing more concerned about her own needs than their own children.

It is later revealed that Cindy never died but was placed under a witness protection programme after informing on her cellmate. She had relocated to Spain under the assumed name of Rose Sawyer, then married George Knight (Colin Salmon) and gave birth to two more daughters, Gina (Francesca Henry) and Anna Knight (Molly Rainford), before disappearing from their lives without explanation after inadvertently compromising the witness protection programme. The decision to reintroduce Cindy was praised by fans and critics alike.

Since her return, her storylines have included: bonding with her children; feuding with Ian's mother Kathy Beale (Gillian Taylforth); confronting Bobby Beale (Clay Milner Russell) over Lucy Beale's (Hetti Bywater) murder, which he was responsible for; setting up "Beale's Eels" with Ian and Dean Wicks (Matt Di Angelo); attempting to reconcile with George, having an affair with George's son Junior Knight (Micah Balfour) after George rejects her; threatening George's brother Kojo Asare (Dayo Koleosho) and Lauren Branning (Jacqueline Jossa) when they nearly expose the affair; being left unconscious by Kathy on Christmas Day 2024 when Lauren exposes the affair, a storyline which tied into the show's 40th anniversary when she caused an explosion by attempting to murder Ian by shooting and pushing him in front of a car driven by Reiss Colwell (Jonny Freeman) causing him to crash into the Queen Vic, which in turn killed Reiss and Martin Fowler (James Bye); discovering Kathy's affair with Harvey Monroe (Ross Boatman) and using it to blackmail her into selling her the Prince Albert bar; being attacked by Jasmine Fisher (Indeyarna Donaldson-Holness); and a relationship with Lauren's father, Max Branning (Jake Wood). In September 2026, Cindy marries Max, unaware that he has been having an affair with Priya Nandra-Hart (Sophie Khan Levy).

== Creation and development ==
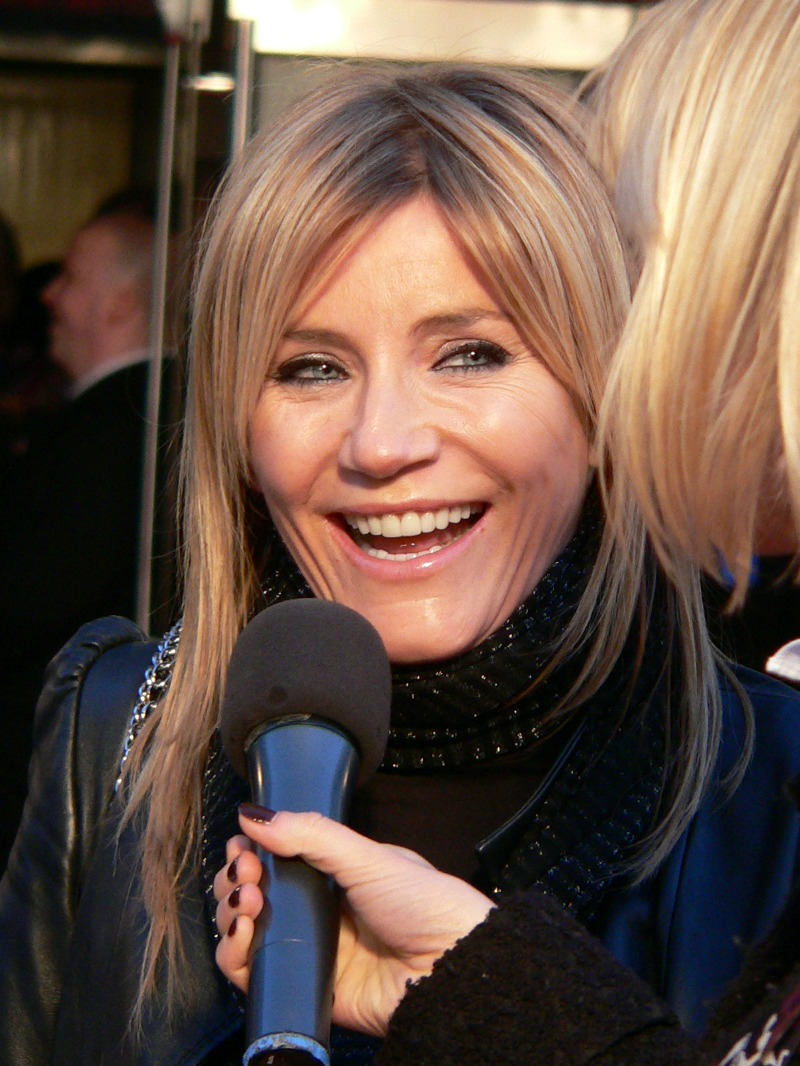
Michelle Collins portrays Cindy

Cindy was introduced in 1988 in a minor role as a love-interest for Simon Wicks (Nick Berry). She was due to appear in only eleven episodes but the character evolved. Writer Colin Brake has suggested that Cindy was "the most important character for the future" to be introduced in 1988, despite her low-key entrance.

Actress Michelle Collins was asked to audition for the part by the soap's co-creator, Julia Smith, who saw her perform on stage. Collins had previously auditioned for the role of original character Mary Smith, but at the time Julia Smith had decided they did not want that character to be from London, so that role went to Linda Davidson. Three years on, Collins won the role of Cindy. She has commented, "Cindy arrived for 11 episodes, working on a hat stall and as a tease for Wicksy, but evolved into a much juicier character. Julia Smith said it would change my life. I didn't believe her – how wrong I was."

In 2015, former executive producer Matthew Robinson explained in a blog post why he had Cindy killed off, saying that keeping her alive "might have benefited the show" but it would have required Collins to commit to three days of filming to depict the birth of Cindy's baby and the outcome of her trial, because "no proper producer could allow off-screen portrayal of massive soap events like those". However, Collins never committed to the episodes and Robinson felt he had no choice but to kill the character off-screen.

=== Reintroduction ===
On 19 May 2023, it was reported that Collins would be returning to the show after 25 years in a storyline accommodating the return of Ian, thus resurrecting the character from the dead.

=== Who Attacked Cindy? ===
After Cindy's affair with Junior Knight (Micah Balfour) is exposed, scenes showing Cindy being attacked by an unknown individual aired at the end of the show's 2024 Christmas broadcast. It was reported that Cindy's attacker would be revealed during the show's 40th anniversary week. Executive producer Chris Clenshaw explained that the reveal had been planned for the anniversary since early development of the celebration to add to its memorability. There were nine official suspects for Cindy's attacker: her fiancé, Ian Beale (Adam Woodyatt); their son, Peter Beale (Thomas Law); Peter's girlfriend, Lauren Branning (Jacqueline Jossa); Ian's mother, Kathy Beale (Gillian Taylforth); Cindy's ex-husband George Knight (Colin Salmon); their daughters Gina Knight (Francesca Henry) and Anna Knight (Molly Rainford); George's son, Junior; and George's wife, Elaine Knight (Harriet Thorpe). The attacker was later revealed to be Kathy.

== Storylines ==
=== 1988–1990 ===
Cindy as she appeared in 1989

Cindy Williams first arrives at Albert Square in May 1988, wherein she begins working on her mother's market stall selling hats. She dates barman Simon Wicks (Nick Berry), who is also seeing Donna Ludlow (Matilda Ziegler), leading Cindy and Donna to fight for Simon's attention. However, Cindy grows tired of Simon's womanising, and despite his feelings for her, she moves on to Ian Beale (Adam Woodyatt), who is becoming a successful entrepreneur. Initially she only wants to make Simon jealous but she and Ian start dating and by February 1989, they announce their engagement. Meanwhile, Simon retaliates by reconciling with Sharon Watts (Letitia Dean). However, while working together late one night at the Queen Victoria public house, Cindy and Simon have sex and Cindy becomes pregnant. She suggests leaving Ian for Simon but he refuses, not wanting to be tied down or upset his family so Cindy marries Ian, letting him think he is the baby's father, giving birth to Steven Beale (Edward Farrell) in December 1989. However, Simon decides he wants to be a father to his son and convinces Cindy to leave Ian, devastating him with the news that Steven is not his son and a feud erupts when he realises Simon is the father. Ian's behaviour grows erratic; after attempting suicide and failing, he chooses to ruin Simon's life instead so Simon decides to leave Walford with Cindy and Steven, leaving Ian heartbroken.

=== 1992–1998 ===
In 1992, Ian discovers that Simon has abandoned Cindy and Steven. Ian persuades her to return to Walford so he can help her bring Steven up. They reunite and Cindy gets pregnant in 1993. Richard Cole (Ian Reddington) is romantically interested in Cindy but she rejects him, so Richard tells people that he is the father of her twins. Everyone believes him, and Ian and Cindy almost separate but the truth emerges, just before Lucy and Peter Beale are born in December. Married life and motherhood takes its toll on Cindy and she has two affairs, first with Matt (Toby Walton), a lifeguard, in 1994, and then with Simon's half-brother, David Wicks (Michael French), also Ian's half-brother, in 1995. Cindy and David meet secretly for a year and she falls in love with David, growing less and less tolerant of Ian. Suspecting Cindy is cheating, Ian hires a private investigator, who records Cindy and David in a clinch. Ian vows to take Cindy to court for custody of their children. David loses interest in Cindy so she takes drastic action and in October 1996, she hires John Valecue (Steve Weston), a hitman to kill Ian. Although she changes her mind, it is too late and Ian is shot, collapsing in a pool of blood in front of Cindy. The police suspect Cindy is involved and when David is called in for questioning, Cindy knows she will soon be arrested, so decides to flee with her children. Assisted by David and Barry Evans (Shaun Williamson), she collects her sons, but is unable to get Lucy, and is forced to leave without her. David also stays behind, promising Cindy that he will try to get Lucy and join her later, but he never does.

Ian's private investigator, Ros Thorne (Clare Grogan) tracks Cindy to Italy in 1997. Ian, Phil Mitchell (Steve McFadden) and Grant Mitchell (Ross Kemp) find her, and Phil and Grant abduct Steven and Peter while Ian claims he still loves Cindy and will forgive her. Desperate to get her daughter back, Cindy goes along with him but grows suspicious and calls the police, but it is too late. Despite a police chase, Ian brings his sons back to Walford. Cindy soon follows Ian back to Walford with her new boyfriend, Nick Holland (Dominic Taylor). She takes Ian to court for custody of the children and wins. However, while collecting her children, Cindy is arrested for conspiracy to murder when Ian's associates visit Valecue in prison while he is serving a life sentence for murder, and persuade him to tell the police about Cindy's involvement. Ian wins full custody of the children and Cindy is charged and remanded while she is pregnant by Nick. After realising Cindy is guilty, Nick leaves her without any money for a lawyer. In November 1998, Ian receives news that Cindy had died in childbirth. Her daughter survives and is named Cindy Jr by Ian, in her mother's honour. Custody is given to Cindy's sister, Gina Williams (Nicola Cowper).

Believed to be deceased, in 2023, it was revealed that Cindy has in fact entered into witness protection from a plea bargain after having made a deal in prison to give information against her inmate Jackie Ford, in order to avoid a prison sentence for conspiring to kill Ian. It had failed and led to Cindy having to fake her death to escape Jackie's criminal connections. She assumes the new identity of "Rose Sawyer" and marries George Knight (Colin Salmon). They have two daughters, Gina (Francesca Henry) and Anna (Molly Rainford). Whilst living in Marbella in 2014, Rose leaves George following a heated argument and is not seen or heard from again for nine years.

=== 2023–present ===
In June 2023, George, Gina and Anna arrive in Walford to run The Queen Vic with his girlfriend, Elaine Peacock (Harriet Thorpe) and her daughter, Linda Carter (Kellie Bright). Linda does not trust George and becomes suspicious of his mysterious ex-wife Rose. She asks Phil to find Rose. After attempting to press George for details, he later reveals to Linda that Rose suddenly left him. Linda is not convinced and Phil later tells George that there is no record of Rose, after his lawyer Ritchie Scott (Sian Webber) attempts to find her. Shocked by this, George later attempts to phone Rose, and Cindy is revealed to be her true identity after she receives George's call but does not answer. Cindy has been living in France with Ian, Peter (now Thomas Law), and his son, Louie Beale (Freddie Harrington). Cindy's witness protection officer informs her that Jackie has died and she is free to return to her former life. Ian and Cindy argue when Ian suggests that they return to Walford and he later falls into cardiac arrest. Cindy later agrees to return to Walford; however, Ian sees a video via Peter that his son Bobby (Clay Milner Russell) sent him of Cindy's ex-husband George, as the Queen Victoria pub landlord, and tells Cindy that they should remain in France.

Anna hires a private investigator to track Rose down. This causes friction between her and Gina, who takes cocaine to cope. He returns with an active phone number, which Anna calls but goes unanswered, leaving a voicemail and a text message. Peter discovers the voicemail thus finding out he has two sisters. Ian deletes the voicemail and text message; however, Peter returns to Walford to meet Gina and Anna. Cindy follows him to London and visits Kathy, who is furious to discover Cindy is alive and has reconciled with Ian and Peter. Ian arrives to bring Cindy home but is too late to stop her bumping into George, who is hosting Anna's 21st birthday party at the Vic. Cindy explains her true identity to George, explaining she compromised her life with him in witness protection by briefly returning to Walford in 2014 when her daughter Lucy was murdered. Believing the Fords killed Lucy, Cindy chose not to return to Marbella in fear of endangering George, Gina and Anna. Against George's wishes, Cindy is reunited with Gina and Anna, who are both wary of their long-absent mother. Unable to cope with Cindy's reappearance, Gina takes drugs on a night out and is rushed to hospital. Cindy is horrified to learn that Gina has a drug problem, and George blames her return for Gina's relapse. Contemplating their future in Walford, Cindy realises Ian knew that her daughters were in Walford but agrees to forgive his deceit if he helps her reconcile with them. Gina is hostile towards Cindy but Anna is amenable. Cindy and George maintain an antagonistic relationship, although she struggles with her feelings for him. She kisses George which is witnessed by Gina who then reveals it in front of Elaine and Ian. Ian plans to end their relationship but Cindy lies by claiming George initiated the kiss.

Cindy and Ian decide to open up a pie and mash shop, and convince Nish Panesar (Navin Chowdhry) and his wife Suki (Balvinder Sopal) to invest in it. This does not last long and Cindy soon finds a new business partner, although she is unaware of their identity. The partner is revealed to be Dean Wicks (Matt Di Angelo) and Cindy is shocked when Ian reveals that Dean is a rapist, and had raped Linda years earlier. After backlash from residents, Cindy and Ian attempt to end their partnership with Dean, but he refuses. Whilst on a business trip, Peter and Bobby almost perish in Kathy’s Cafe, from a fire started by Kathy’s husband Tom "Rocky" Cotton (Brian Conley) for insurance money. Peter is critically injured and Cindy blames Bobby for Peter’s condition as Peter had gone into the cafe to save him. She also reports Kathy to the police when she reveals that she had ignored issues with the electric, causing Ian to dump her. They reconcile and later discover that Rocky was behind the fire and let Kathy take the blame. Cindy is furious when she discovers that Gina is seeing Dean, and she offers him £60,000 to sell his shares of Beale's Eels to her and Ian and to leave Walford. Dean rejects Cindy's offer and continues dating Gina until she dumps him. After an argument with George, in which he slates Cindy for abandoning Cindy Jnr, Cindy leaves Walford to see Cindy Jnr, who lives in Germany. Cindy returns and reveals that Cindy Jnr has rejected her.

Cindy supports George when he realises that his adoptive father Eddie Knight (Christopher Fairbank) had murdered his biological father Henry Kofi Asare, who was a student from Ghana, in a racist attack. Cindy finds out from Phil that George is participating in unlicensed boxing and they both stop George from fighting after he is severely beaten. George and Cindy later kiss but they hide this from their partners. George collapses at Gloria’s memorial and he is rushed to hospital where it is revealed that George is suffering from chronic traumatic encephalopathy. George promises never to fight again, but Cindy sees George talking with a fighting promoter and she threatens to reveal their kiss if George doesn’t stop fighting, and they are heard by Elaine. Jealous of Cindy's closeness to George, Elaine tells Ian about the kiss, but he forgives Cindy. After George rejects her advances, Cindy sleeps with his son, Junior Knight (Micah Balfour). Cindy believes that Ian is cheating on her when he begins taking regular trips away, and she follows him to the Cotswolds, where she discovers that he is meeting his ex-wife Jane Beale (Laurie Brett). Cindy is furious and resents Jane for covering up Lucy's death and dumping her body in Walford Common to protect Bobby. Ian later reveals his intentions to leave Cindy but they decide to have a fresh start and try again. However, Cindy begins an affair with Junior. She is soon reunited with her ex-lover David, who attempts to seduce her, but she rebuffs his advances. He later walks in on Cindy and Junior kissing. David confronts Cindy and she confesses that she does not love Ian or Junior but is in fact still in love with George. After initially hesitating, David decides to keep Cindy's secret. Cindy decides to end the affair, but cannot resist Junior's temptations, and they resume sleeping together.

Before her wedding to George, Elaine employs Cindy as a "honey trap" to see if George is willing to commit adultery with her, but George turns her down once again. While Cindy and Junior embrace behind The Queen Vic, they are caught by George's brother and Junior's uncle, Kojo Asare (Dayo Koleosho). Cindy chases Kojo to stop him from revealing the affair; however, Kojo loses his balance and falls over a balcony. Peter's girlfriend Lauren Branning (Jacqueline Jossa) discovers Kojo unconscious and becomes suspicious when she sees Cindy. After discovering that Lauren has stolen Amy Mitchell's (Ellie Dadd) painkillers, Cindy uses this to blackmail Lauren. Lauren agrees to keep quiet but continues to taunt Cindy, who later buys non-prescription medication in order to buy her silence about Kojo's fall. Cindy also visits Kojo in hospital and manipulates him by lying that he will be sent back to Ghana if he tells George. Unbeknownst to Cindy, her confession to David about sleeping with Junior and loving George was accidentally recorded by her daughter Anna and Freddie Slater (Bobby Brazier) for their birdwatching tape. When Lauren falls asleep and a toppling candle causes a fire, Cindy helps save Louie, but Lauren still hates her. Elaine obtains the recording and only agrees to keep quiet if Cindy leaves Walford. Cindy convinces Ian that they should return to France, but Lauren soon reveals that she knows about Cindy and Junior's affair after finding the recording. Despite Cindy's pleading, Lauren gifts Ian the recording on Christmas Day and it is played in The Queen Vic. After Ian forces Cindy to leave his house, she orders a taxi to take her to King's Cross train station; alone in the centre of Albert Square, Cindy is hit over the head with a shovel by an unknown figure and left for dead, face-down in the snow; upon being discovered, she has been turned over. She is subsequently placed in an induced coma to recover.

Upon emerging from the coma, she accuses Lauren of attacking her, believing that she saw Lauren that night (she had, though Lauren struggles to remember the events of the night due to intoxication, and confesses to Peter that she turned Cindy over). Lauren is arrested for attempted murder but is released without charge. Upon being discharged from hospital, Peter arranges for Cindy to move in with Reiss Colwell (Jonny Freeman). Lauren confronts Cindy over her accusations just as a brick with a message reading "you should have stayed dead" is flung through the window. This leads Reiss to evict Cindy, so Cindy moves in with Ian, who uses this opportunity to manipulate her into believing George attacked her. Cindy is horrified when she discovers that Gina threw the brick, but Gina proves her innocence when she reveals she slept with Freddie (now Anna's boyfriend). Anna reveals that she and George have hidden the shovel and Cindy demands George hand it over; Junior proceeds to steal it and gives it to Cindy to prove both his innocence and his love for her; she is disappointed when she discovers no DNA on the shovel.

Cindy becomes convinced that Kathy attacked her and conspires to get her drunk and record a confession; Ian discovers this and evicts her from the house, forcing her to move in with Junior. Upon realising that a locket with a picture of Lucy given to her by Ian that morning was stolen after the attack, Cindy becomes convinced Ian attacked her. After failing to convince Ian to allow her into the house to search for the locket, she bribes Priya Nandra-Hart (Sophie Khan Levy) to seduce Ian so that she can find the locket; this plot is eventually foiled by Ian. Undeterred, Cindy steals Phil's gun and enters Number 45, where she catches Ian with the locket and prepares to shoot him; Kathy soon arrives and confesses to attacking Cindy. A fight then ensues, during which Cindy shoots Ian in the arm before fleeing, with Phil reclaiming the gun. Ian and Kathy confront Cindy and offer to bribe her to keep silent about the attack; enraged, Cindy pushes Ian in front of a car being driven by Reiss Colwell (Jonny Freeman), who crashes into the back of the Queen Vic and his car catches fire. Cindy flees into the pub and is pursued by Kathy, just as the flames reach some gas bottles and cause an explosion which destroy the pub and trap most of the community inside. Cindy is severely injured and Kathy considers leaving her to die; regardless, Kathy rescues Cindy and she is taken away by the paramedics, though Cindy vows revenge on Kathy for the Christmas Day attack. After Cindy discharges herself from the hospital the next day, Ian visits her and tells her that her attempt to kill him led to the explosion of the Queen Vic, which also killed his cousin, Martin Fowler (James Bye). He also urges Cindy to drop her vendetta against Kathy or he will go to the police and implicate her for trying to kill him and for Martin's death, reasoning that his family and community have suffered enough and that he will never forget what she did to him. The next day, Cindy demands that Ian gives her the money from her business accounts back, to which he agrees on the condition that she leaves Walford. Cindy meets with Lauren, the Beales and the Knights and tells them that she is leaving to stay with her friend Gita Kapoor (Shobu Kapoor) while she recovers. While everyone else is indifferent to her news, Junior is upset and catches up to Cindy at the train station, where he admits that he has feelings for her. She assures him that she will return to Walford soon to enact her revenge. She later returns to Walford and makes her appearance at Peter and Lauren's engagement party, but is quickly disowned by her entire family when her role in the explosion is exposed. Cindy saves Lauren when she goes into labour and helps her give birth to Jimmy Beale, but her family still refuse to welcome her back, leaving her devastated.

Cindy is delighted when she catches Kathy kissing Harvey Monroe (Ross Boatman) and films them on her phone. Cindy soon confronts Kathy with the recording, demanding she sell the Prince Albert in exchange for her keeping the affair a secret. Kathy agrees to this and sells the bar to Cindy, though she soon screens the video to a packed Queen Vic regardless. Despite their general disgust at these events, Peter and Lauren eventually allow Cindy to move in with them to help around the house after Jimmy is diagnosed with coloboma. After George and Elaine's marriage breaks down and they sell the Vic, Cindy hires Elaine as a joint-manager at the Prince Albert. Cindy becomes power-mad, firing bartender Freddie Slater (Bobby Brazier) and replacing him with Jasmine Fisher (Indeyarna Donaldson-Holness), who immediately takes an interest in Cindy. Despite her initial approval of Jasmine, Cindy becomes concerned when she fails to find any record of Jasmine and learns of Jasmine's obsession with her. She and Lauren (who is concerned about Jasmine due to her relationship with her brother Oscar Branning (Pierre Counihan-Moullier) decide to reach out to Jasmine's mother Anita Fisher (Keri Mosuro) where they learn that Jasmine's father's side of the family is dangerous. Cindy becomes convinced that Jasmine has been sent by the Fords to get revenge on her and convinces Lauren to evict her. Cindy then confronts a devastated Jasmine on the steps of the Prince Albert, resulting in Jasmine pushing Cindy down the stairs and rendering her comatose. Upon waking up in hospital, Cindy learns that Jasmine has fled Walford and is instructed by her witness protection handlers to go into hiding while they investigate any potential threats she may face. Cindy returns to Walford on Christmas Day when it is concluded that Jasmine is not linked to the Fords, but Peter refuses to let her join them for Christmas dinner due to the presence of Lauren's father Max Branning (Jake Wood), who had caused Steven's death in 2017. Cindy ultimately spends the day alone at the Albert, but after bumping into Max after he storms out of the Beale-Branning Christmas dinner, the two have sex, unaware of each other's identities, and are later both horrified when they discover this. Nevertheless, the two eventually team up in an attempt to force Jasmine, their mutual enemy, to leave Walford.

Over the following weeks, Max and Cindy grow closer and sleep together again. On a day out with their grandson Jimmy, their car collides with Priya's and Cindy becomes trapped in the burning car; Max barely manages to save her before the car explodes. Following this event, the two decide to give their relationship a try, with Max even asking Cindy to move in with him. Max later drunkenly proposes to Cindy at Vicki Fowler (Alice Haig) and Ross Marshall's (Alex Walkinshaw) wedding, but an embarrassed Cindy rejects him. Max subsequently begins an affair with his employee, Priya, which continues even after Cindy eventually accepts his proposal. On the day of their wedding, after suffering a heart attack, Max breaks up with Cindy at the hospital after confessing he does not love her. When Jean Slater (Gillian Wright) accidentally reveals Max's affair with Priya to Cindy, she angrily confronts Priya in the Vic. Max, who is also secretly in a relationship with Linda, leaves Cindy after confessing he doesn't love her. Cindy develops a vendetta against Max and pledges to destroy his life.

== Reception ==
In 2020, Sara Wallis and Ian Hyland from the Daily Mirror placed Cindy 20th on their ranked list of the best EastEnders characters of all time, calling her "scheming", "Selfish" and a "Homewrecker" who "worked her way through most of Walford's men in her 10-year stint, but settled for boring Ian".

Following her 2023 return, The Daily Telegraph described the scenes as a "camp, compelling Bank Holiday treat". They gave the episodes a review of four stars out of a possible five and joked: "Who needs Barbie when we've got Cindy?" and billed her as a "peroxide piranha". They opined that her return to EastEnders was what the show needed to regain buzz amidst live ratings dropping in 2023. Radio Times praised executive producer Chris Clenshaw's decision to reintroduce her and said that her "epic" return "more than lived up to expectations". Likewise, Digital Spy praised all aspects of Cindy's return as they felt that despite the extravagant nature of the storyline, EastEnders had not gone overboard by bringing her back.

For her role as Cindy, Collins was longlisted for "Best Actress" at the 2024 Inside Soap Awards.

== See also ==
- List of soap opera villains
