= Ravi Gulati (EastEnders) =

Fictional character from EastEnders

- EastEnders character
- Portrayed by: Aaron Thiara
- Duration: 2022–present
- First appearance: Episode 6515; 4 July 2022
- Introduced by: Chris Clenshaw
In-universe information
- Other names: Ravjot Singh Gulati
- Occupation: Career criminal Drug dealer Restaurateur; Businessman; Gym owner
- Family: Panesar
- Father: Nish Panesar
- Mother: Haspira Gulati
- Adoptive father: Ranveer Gulati
- Stepmother: Suki Panesar; Nina Gupta (adoptive)
- Half-brothers: Kheerat Panesar; Jags Panesar; Vinny Panesar
- Half-sisters: Ash Panesar
- Sons: Davinder "Nugget" Gulati
- Daughters: Avani Nandra-Hart
- Nephews: Tyrion Ahmed

Ravi Gulati is a fictional character from the BBC soap opera EastEnders and is portrayed by Aaron Thiara. Ravi made his first appearance in episode 6515, originally broadcast on 4 July 2022. Ravi was introduced as a fellow prisoner of established character Phil Mitchell (Steve McFadden) and a former associate of Kheerat Panesar (Jaz Deol), though later revealed as the illegitimate son of Nish Panesar (Navin Chowdhry); however, viewers did not originally know this, as there was no announcement prior to the plot twist.

Since the character's first appearance, Ravi has been involved in with some of the serial's key storylines including being in multiple feuds, reuniting with his estranged son Davinder "Nugget" Gulati (Juhaim Rasul Choudhury) and discovering another child, Avani Nandra-Hart (Aaliyah James), murdering his adoptive father, Ranveer Gulati (Anil Goutam), and allowing stepmother Suki Panesar (Balvinder Sopal) to believe that she killed him. Later, he seduces a married Denise Fox (Diane Parish), which saw viewers having the opportunity to vote for either Ravi or Jack to be Denise's lover in the "EastEnders 40th Anniversary Week" – they ultimately voted for Jack. Further plots have seen Ravi recruited by Nish to kidnap Eve Unwin (Heather Peace), learning Nish has a terminal illness and later killing him following a final confrontation where Nish attempts to murder Suki and Eve, turning back to crime after he is defrauded by Bernadette Taylor (Clair Norris), rekindling his relationship with Priya Nandra-Hart (Sophie Khan Levy), embarking on a cuckooing plot against Harry Mitchell (Elijah Holloway) and Kojo Asare (Dayo Koleosho) after they lose his drugs, becoming a police informant to evade prosecution, accidentally assaulting Nugget after being drugged by Harry and Nicola Mitchell (Laura Doddington), self-harming out of guilt, and being institutionalised after suffering a breakdown and attempting suicide.

== Casting and development ==
=== Introduction and backstory ===
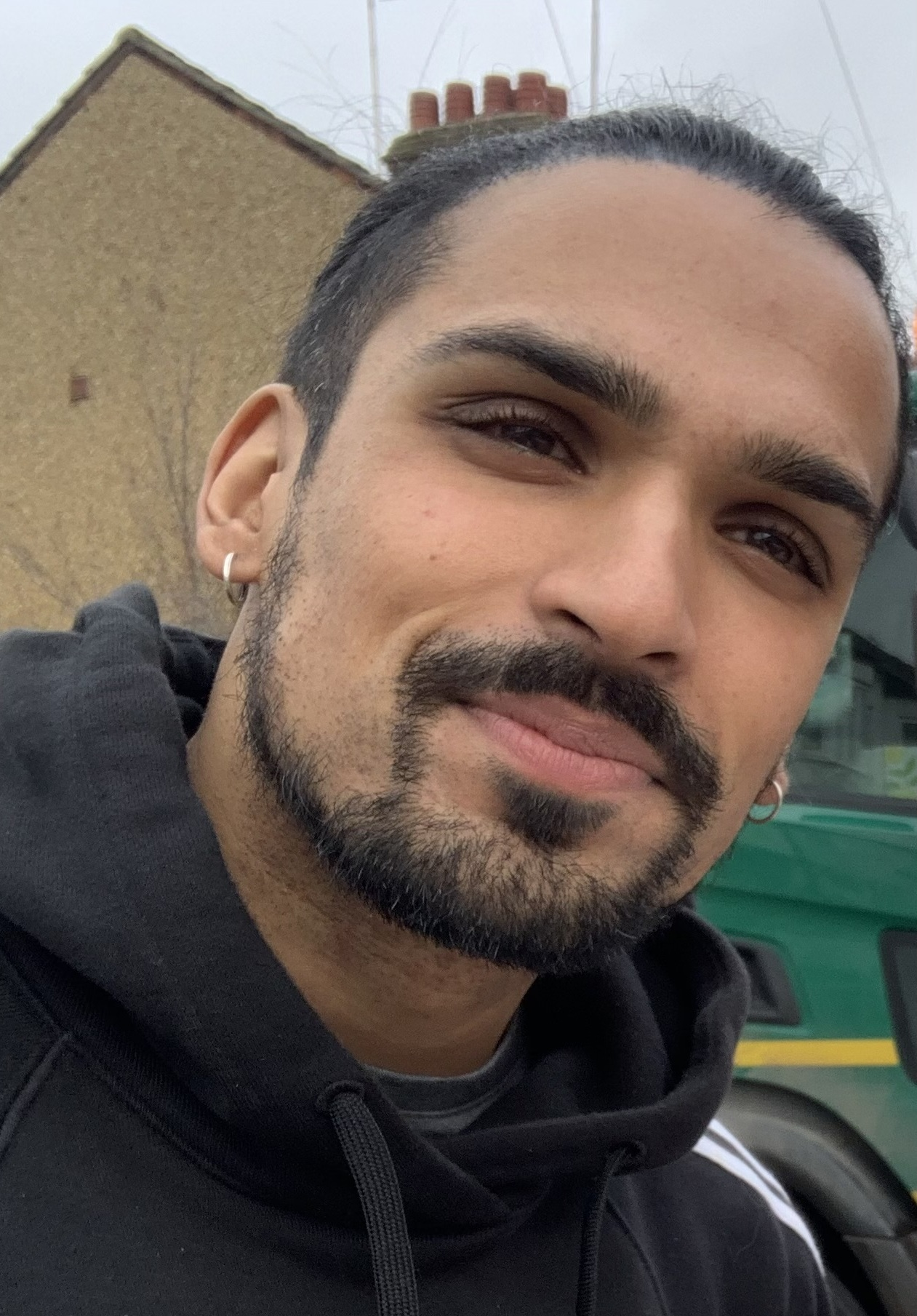
Aaron Thiara joined the cast in 2022

"My heart is filled with immense gratitude to be joining such an iconic show, working alongside a stellar cast and a remarkable production team. It's a very proud moment for me and my family. This is a wondrous opportunity to approach as an actor, and I can't wait for people to meet Ravi on-screen and witness his roller-coaster of a journey!"

— Thiara upon his casting (2022)

Executive producer Chris Clenshaw also added: "Ravi is captivating, cunning and dangerous, and can go from pleasant to menacing with very little warning – unlike Aaron who's a wonderful addition to the EastEnders cast. We're all excited to see Aaron bring the character to life and there's plenty of drama and shocking twists in store – wherever Ravi goes, trouble follows". Thiara's casting and character were also announced on the same day as his debut aired. Shaun Wren of Digital Spy described the character as "charming and charismatic" and "ruthless and unpredictable", while show bosses have also teased that Ravi is "willing to do whatever it takes to get what he wants with no fear of the consequences". It was later revealed that Ravi is in fact the son of Nish Panesar (Navin Chowdhry) – he had an affair with Ranveer Gulati's (Anil Goutam) wife Haspira and Ravi is then conceived. It is initially believed by viewers Ranveer was Ravi's father but this is revealed to be a lie. He also has an affair with Nina Gupta (Hersha Verity), Ranveer's wife, and this is unbeknownst to him.

=== Affair with Denise Fox ===
The storyline's build up to the affair is scenes where viewers can see Ravi and Denise Fox (Diane Parish) drinking together in Peggy's wine bar. He insists on walking her home but once they make it to the square, he attempts to make an advance. Denise quickly shuts Ravi down after much temptation because she realises how much she values her husband Jack Branning (Scott Maslen). Ravi then deliberately starts to follow Denise around, even ending back up at her house. They start passionately kissing after Ravi reminds her of her current marital issues. After chemistry is developed between Ravi and Denise, she cannot help herself but entertain Ravi's attention as he is her only source at that time as the family are also struggling with Amy Mitchell's (Ellie Dadd) self-harm and Ricky Mitchell's (Frankie Day) teenage pregnancy with Lily Slater (Lillia Turner). In the light of recent events, Denise begins to struggle in her marriage and begins contracting feelings for Ravi. He invites Denise to a hotel, to which after much consideration she accepts. They meet in the hotel and begin again passionately kissing however Denise realises she can no longer go through with it. She is caught on CCTV at the hotel as Jack and Callum Highway (Tony Clay) are working on a case against Ravi. Denise then tells Ravi about the case and how Callum is aware of where she was, he begins to blackmail Denise. When she does not succumb to his demands, he begins dating her daughter Chelsea Fox (Zaraah Abrahams). After Denise's continuous meddling and discouragement, Chelsea begins a relationship for Ravi and provides him with a false alibi. The romance later ends after Denise steals Ravi's laptop and finds a CCTV recording of Ravi murdering Ranveer despite Ravi destroying the evidence. The affair is later revealed to Jack; the pair start publicly brawling outside the Walford East restaurant that Ravi owns. Ravi then puts himself on Jack's radar as Jack claims he will get him by the book.

=== Introduction of estranged daughter ===
On 21 September 2023, it was announced that Ravi and his son Davinder "Nugget" Gulati (Juhaim Rasul Choudhury) would appear in a storyline central to their family that would lead to the introduction of his former lover and Nugget's mother, Priya Nandra-Hart (Sophie Khan Levy). Avani Nandra-Hart (Aaliyah James) was also announced as a new character, and was introduced as Ravi and Priya's secret daughter, and Nugget's sister. The characters and both James' and Khan Levy's casting details were announced on the same day. In the character's backstory, Priya became pregnant with Avani after the end of her relationship with Ravi, so he does not know about her existence upon her introduction. It was also revealed by Priya that Ranveer sexually assaulted her and paid her off to leave Ravi, Nugget and their family whilst she was pregnant with Avani. Nugget runs away to his mother after Suki reveals to him that Ravi murdered Ranveer. Nugget is found staying with Priya. Nugget is returned to Albert Square by Jack, Nish, Suki and Ravi. The next day, Priya, along with Avani, arrive in Walford. Scenes earlier showed Priya and Avani being evicted from their home, and so they scheme until Nish allows them stay.

=== Viewer voted storyline ===
Ahead of the show's 40th anniversary celebrations, it was announced that a live episode would be broadcast to celebrate the occasion (as had been done previously in 2010, 2012 and 2015); however, unlike previous occasions, this would feature an interactive element by allowing the viewers to vote on one of the show's storylines. On the 6th of January 2025, it was confirmed that this element of the episode would see the conclusion of a love triangle between Denise, Jack and Ravi, with viewers given the choice as to whether she would reunite with Jack (following their divorce earlier in the year) or Ravi. Clenshaw expressed excitement to give viewers the opportunity to choose, as well as to see which suitor would win the vote. Clenshaw, who has been recognised for attempting to appeal EastEnders to a younger audience during his tenure, incorporated the twist to appeal to Generation Z, explaining: "They watch reality TV, they've grown up with video games, they're used to being involved in the narrative".He has also stated that the interactive element was incorporated as a "gift" for consistent viewers. It was confirmed that the choice's outcome would be revealed during the live episode, with a scene set to depict Denise knocking on the door of the chosen man.

The storyline began on Christmas Day 2024, when Denise and Ravi share a kiss in the snow, eventually having sex. After Nish attacks Denise on New Year's Day and leaves her in a comatose state, Ravi angrily kills him, and the two eventually rekindle their romance in the aftermath, despite Jack's continued attempts to woo his ex-wife. When the affair is exposed,. Denise ends her relationship with Ravi, but comes to realise she must choose between her two suitors. In the aftermath of an explosion at the Queen Vic, she eventually decides to reconcile with Jack.

The vote opened on 19 February 2025, following the respective episode's conclusion, and remained open from 8:30 pm to 7:10 pm the following day, closing only twenty minutes before the live episode's airing. To vote, audiences had to answer a poll on the BBC website. After being independently verified, Clenshaw would discard the script that lost. It was teased on 31 January 2025 that as well as voting for Denise's partner, viewers would also be given another vote to decide a development in a story. This choice was later revealed to be the choice of name for Sonia Fowler's (Natalie Cassidy), baby daughter, with viewers being given the options of Julia and Toni, after the show's creators Julia Smith and Tony Holland, respectively. The results of each vote were revealed in the live episode, as it depicted Denise rekindling her romance with Jack and Sonia naming her newborn daughter Julia.

Thiara said of his role in the storyline that he was "deeply grateful" to be involved in the show's anniversary, having enjoyed the soap's previous milestone events. In the aftermath of the anniversary week, Jack and Denise resumed their relationship, with Ravi eventually reconciling with Priya several months later. Clenshaw has since opined that he believed viewers had made the right choice and that he was "pleased" with the outcome.

=== Return to crime and cuckooing storyline ===
In February 2025, Nish's will is unsealed, where Bernadette Taylor (Clair Norris) is made executor of Nish's estate. Bernadette subsequently uses this as an opportunity to embezzle the family's wealth in order to get revenge on Ravi's stepmother Suki Panesar (Balvinder Sopal) and her fellow conspirators for their role in the murder of her brother Keanu Taylor (Danny Walters). With the Panesar family left in financial ruin, Ravi returns to a life of crime, despite his promises to Priya that he would go straight. Ravi soon recruits Tobias "Okie" Okyere (Aayan Ibikunle Shoderu) to help him pedal drugs and the two blackmail Harry Mitchell (Elijah Holloway) and Kojo Asare (Dayo Koleosho) to assist in their criminal enterprise after the two men lose their drugs.

Okie and Ravi formed what Joshua Halm from Metro described to be a "dangerous alliance". It was also revealed that Kojo, an autistic man, was made vulnerable to the cuckooing process, which is the practice of using a person's dwelling, usually one who is vulnerable, for illegal activities. Executive producer Ben Wadey spoke about the storyline: "At EastEnders, we're proud to tell stories that reflect the real challenges people face, and Kojo's cuckooing storyline is one that feels especially important." He continued: "Cuckooing is a form of exploitation that too often goes unseen and hasn't featured on EastEnders before. Through Kojo's experience we hope to have shined a light on how easily vulnerable people can be manipulated and isolated – something that can happen in any community, but feels particularly resonant in a city like London, where people live side by side and yet can still slip through the cracks. Working closely with experts and charities, our aim has been to tell this story with care and authenticity, and to raise awareness as to how to identify the signs of exploitation and the importance of reaching out for help."

To portray the cuckooing storyline, EastEnders has worked with Causeway, a modern slavery charity, and the National Autistic Society as well experts in the field of the cuckooing element of the storyline. Helen Ball, CEO of Causeway, spoke about the storyline: "Causeway are proud to have supported EastEnders on this important and timely storyline. Cuckooing is a cruel and dehumanising form of exploitation where the home of someone vulnerable is taken over by criminals. We were grateful to EastEnders for the opportunity to work with their team on the research behind this storyline and we hope that by shining a light on cuckooing, EastEnders can help raise awareness of the issue and help people spot the signs of grooming and exploitation around them." Dr Judith Brown, Head of Evidence and Research at the National Autistic Society, also commented on working with the show's bosses to carefully and truthfully portray the story: "It's a privilege to work with the EastEnders team on such a painful yet significant storyline about Kojo's "cuckooing" or home takeover. We thank the entire EastEnders team for focusing on a genuine issue that impacts the lives of autistic people. The awful truth is that autistic people are more at risk of abuse, victimisation and exploitation than non-autistic people. Because autistic people can find it hard to interpret social cues, emotions and inferred meaning, some may not always recognise manipulative or dangerous behaviours from others. We hope this storyline encourages any autistic person or parent of autistic children to learn what abuse and exploitation can look like."

== Storylines ==
=== Backstory ===
Ravi is the son of Nish Panesar (Navin Chowdhry) — he had an affair with Ranveer Gulati's (Anil Goutam) wife Haspira and Ravi is then conceived. Ranveer raises Ravi as his own though the childhood is not happy as in an argument with Ranveer as a teenager, he reveals that he is in fact not biologically his. Haspira dies during Ravi's adolescence. Due to his deranged childhood, Ravi ends up becoming a drug dealer and a teenage father to Davinder "Nugget" Gulati (Juhaim Rasul Choudhury) with later established character Priya Nandra-Hart (Sophie Khan Levy). Soon after Nugget's birth, Priya is paid off by Ranveer after he attempts to rape her and she leaves pregnant with Ravi's second child, Avani Nandra-Hart (Aaliyah James). Ravi ends up in prison, leaving Ranveer to raise Nugget.

=== 2022–present ===
Ravi is first seen as an associate of Phil Mitchell (Steve McFadden), who is trying to purchase a phone from him. After the phone is purchased and both Phil and Ravi are released from prison, Ravi is seen making an appearance in Albert Square and he is instantly recognised by Phil and former acquaintances Kheerat Panesar (Jaz Deol) and his brother Vinny Panesar (Shiv Jalota). It was then revealed that he was also their half-brother as Nish had an affair with his mother that ended up in his conception. Suki Panesar (Balvinder Sopal) is initially very hostile towards Ravi and his son Davinder "Nugget" Gulati (Juhaim Rasul Choudhury) as she struggles to accept Nish's illegitimate child. When Ranveer attacks Suki and tries to rape her in exchange for a business contract, she strikes him over the head with a clock. Ravi walks in and begins covering up the crime for Suki, but Ranveer regains consciousness and begins attacking Ravi. Ravi delivers the final blow to Ranveer's head, killing him, and later disposes of his body. It was also revealed that he raped his personal assistant Priti, who had told Ravi about it. Ravi has a short-lived sexual affair with Ranveer's wife, Dr. Nina Gupta (Hersha Verity).

Ravi begins to try and charm Denise Fox (Diane Parish); she is going through extramarital issues and she begins to suppress her inner-torment for Ravi. She later kisses Ravi by mistake, but she starts to catch genuine feelings for him and they meet at a hotel. They are found out after Callum Highway (Tony Clay) views the surveillance footage of the hotel that Ravi was staying at that night and catches Denise arriving to the same hotel. Denise decides to not go through with the plan as she realises the importance of husband Jack Branning (Scott Maslen) and her family. She leaves the hotel back to Jack who she lies to. Jack later finds out and him and Ravi embark on a feud. He begins to use Denise's daughter Chelsea (Zaraah Abrahams) to make Denise jealous, and they embark on a brief romance – this is short-lived as Denise puts Chelsea off him. Chelsea becomes close to Ravi once again and they resume their fling, but he is only using her to intercept Jack's criminal investigation of him. When Ravi is arrested for possession of stolen goods, Chelsea stands by him and offers him a false alibi. Denise later reveals her previous affair with Ravi to Jack, who then exposes it to Chelsea. Chelsea also realises that Ravi has been using her and ends their relationship, though they later reconcile. When Whitney and Zack move into another flat, Chelsea invites Ravi and Nugget to move in. During their housewarming party, Denise reveals that Ravi had murdered Ranveer. Chelsea evicts Ravi and ends their relationship once again.

Ravi has Kheerat attacked in prison after Suki reveals the truth about Ranveer to Nugget. Nugget is distraught and later runs away, though he is found by Ravi, Nish and Jack staying with his mother, Priya. Priya then arrives back onto the Square for Nugget, to which she reveals to Ravi that he has a daughter, Avani, and is invited to stay by Nish. Ravi and Avani bond straight away – his children bring out more of a vulnerable side to the character as he did not receive the same amount of affection as a child. When Nish stumbles upon the truth of Suki's affair with Eve Unwin (Heather Peace), Nish orders Ravi to kill her. Ravi does go through with the plan but decides to spare Eve's life under the conditions she does not return to Albert Square. Nish and Ravi are later arrested after Eve plants sufficient evidence in Ravi's car to bring him and Nish to justice. Eve then returns to the square whilst they're in custody, and after a call from Jack, they are released. They return home on Christmas Day. Nish punches Ravi for dishonouring him. Ravi restrains Nish while Suki manages to flee and escape the house after months of Nish's coercive control. Ravi later helps evict Nish when his abuse of Suki is finally exposed several months later.

In March 2024, Priya starts to embark on a fling with Martin Fowler (James Bye). They go for a date in Peggy's wine bar – much to Avani and Ravi's dismay. Avani wants Ravi and Priya to reconcile as she believes that there is still chemistry between the pair. Priya then arranges for the pair to have a date at home – they are disrupted by Ravi due to Avani's meddling in the situation. Avani tells Ravi that Priya is seriously ill so he would return home just before Martin arrives. They go on a second date in Walford East after Avani goes missing. The date is a disaster as Avani flirts with Martin, embarrasses Priya and then spills all of her drink jug over Martin.

Three months after being disowned by his family, he returns to Walford, claiming to be dying of viral myocarditis and begs his family for another chance; Ravi refuses to accept Nish, believing he is faking his illness; however, he eventually realises Nish is telling the truth when he collapses. Ravi decides to allow Nish to move in with him, deciding to show compassion to his father to prove he is a better man than him; Nish rewards this loyalty by signing over the local call centre to Ravi. When Nugget collapses after overdosing on steroids, Ravi begins bonding with Priya again; this is scuppered when Nish reveals that he and Priya shared a kiss. Ravi continues to support Nugget when he requires dialysis.

Ravi becomes suspicious of Avani's frequent absences; Avani claims she is in a relationship with Barney Mitchell (Lewis Bridgeman), whilst she is actually having a relationship with an older man, Mason (Alex Draper). When she returns home with injuries caused by Mason assaulting her, Ravi assumes Barney is responsible and dangles him from the Bridge, stopping only when Avani reveals the truth. Ravi eventually locates Mason and attacks him, but is horrified when he discovers that the call centre has been set alight by Barney's father and brother Teddy (Roland Manookian) and Harry Mitchell (Elijah Holloway). Ravi refuses to report the Mitchells to the police, even when he is accused of causing the fire due to his lack of an alibi, however, he is convinced against seeking vengeance by Suki.

Ravi is shocked when Nish is arrested for the murder of Keanu Taylor (Danny Walters), unaware that he is covering for Suki, Denise, Linda Carter (Kellie Bright), Kathy Beale (Gillian Taylforth), Stacey Slater (Lacey Turner) and Sharon Watts (Letitia Dean). When he visits Nish more than a month later, Nish tries to guilt trip Ravi into preventing Suki and Eve's wedding; when Ravi refuses, Nish escapes from prison. Denise soon gets closer to Ravi in the hopes of gaining information on Nish's whereabouts, fearful of Nish returning to Walford to avenge her attack on him on Christmas Day. When Denise suffers a panic attack after a prank by schoolchildren, she confesses to Ravi that she was the one who attacked Nish, not Keanu. Ravi eventually agrees to not report Denise to the police and the two kiss on Christmas Day 2024. Denise asks Ravi to allow her time to consider whether to enter into a relationship with him, but provides him with emotional support when Nish is presumed dead; both are unaware that Nish has faked his death with Nugget's help. Nugget confesses to Vinny and Ravi on the day of Suki's wedding; when Nish arrives at the hotel, Nish confesses to attacking Denise as revenge for her attempt to kill him a year previously. Nish eventually escapes and poisons Eve, before taking Suki as a hostage on the hotel balcony. When Ravi arrives, Nish goads him into pushing him off the balcony, unaware that Nish is holding onto Suki's wedding dress; when Ravi pushes him, both fall off the balcony. Ultimately, Nish dies of his injuries whilst the women recover from his murder attempts. Ravi is emotionally unstable in the aftermath of killing Nish and confesses the murder to Denise, encouraging her to stay away from him; despite this, the two eventually resume their relationship. Nugget eventually discovers the relationship but agrees to remain silent; despite this, Nugget becomes hostile to his father. Ravi and Priya later kiss but he informs her that he is already in a relationship; shortly afterwards, Denise and Ravi are exposed to both of their families, resulting in a tense argument between Ravi and Jack which ends when Denise ends their relationship; she eventually reconciles with Jack in the aftermath of the Queen Vic explosion.

Ravi supports Avani when it is revealed that she has been strip searched by the police. He becomes overprotective and nearly attacks Joel Marshall (Max Murray) when it is revealed that he slept with Avani. Bernadette Taylor (Clair Norris) is put in charge of the Panesar family finances until Nugget and Avani come of age. She hires Joel's stepmother Vicki Fowler (Alice Haig) as an assistant accountant, but Ravi grows suspicious of unusual transactions. Unbeknownst to the Panesars, Bernadette is secretly embezzling money from them and planning to flee Walford. When Ravi confronts her, she frames Vicki. Ravi locks Joel in the freezer at Walford East, so Vicki can confess, but she maintains her innocence. Eventually, the Panesars uncover Bernadette's plans, but she manages to escape with the help of Suki, after threatening to expose Suki's role in Keanu's death if Suki does not let her leave. The family businesses suffer as a result, and Ravi is forced back into drug dealing. He recruits Harry Mitchell (Elijah Holloway) and Tobias "Okie" Okyere (Aayan Ibikunle Shoderu) to peddle drugs for him. However, Harry's flatmate Kojo Asare (Dayo Koleosho) flushes the drugs down the toilet, leaving Harry indebted to Ravi. Jack arrests Ravi after being tipped off by Harry's mother Nicola Mitchell (Laura Doddington), but he is released due to insufficient evidence. Ravi learns that Avani has had an abortion after falling pregnant for Joel, and is disgusted when Suki's wife Eve exposes Suki's plan to conceal the pregnancy and adopt Avani's baby. Ravi and Priya grow closer as they support Avani and eventually sleep together. They decide to give their relationship another chance.

Ravi's cuckooing of Harry and Kojo continues, forcing them to deal drugs and using their flat as a base of operations. Ravi orders Harry to hide a gun owned by Okie; however, it is discovered by Jack's nephew Oscar Branning (Pierre Counihan-Moullier) and Jack agrees to dispose of it to protect Oscar from potential consequences due to his criminal record. Ravi learns that Jack has the gun and breaks into his house to retrieve it during the wedding of Patrick Trueman (Rudolph Walker) and Yolande Trueman (Angela Wynter). Jack confronts Ravi, during which the gun is accidentally fired, injuring Zoe Slater (Michelle Ryan). Fearing arrest, the two work together to frame Greg Dolan (Dean Williamson) for the shooting. A desperate Harry eventually convinces Nicola to pay off his remaining debt before she departs Walford temporarily; Ravi agrees to this but continues to use Kojo. A guilt-ridden Harry eventually learns of this and informs his father Teddy Mitchell (Roland Manookian), who plants a camera in the flat with a view to gaining material to blackmail Ravi. Ravi discovers the camera and kidnaps him when he claims he had placed it there. Ravi has Okie keep Harry chained to a wall in the flat whilst force-feeding him drugs and has Kojo taken to Wales as a hostage. Ravi is horrified when he learns that Joel had uploaded footage of him and Avani having sex and decides to step back from the drug operation to support his family. He takes his family on holiday and puts Okie in charge of the operation, ordering him to release Harry from captivity. Upon Ravi's departure, Okie ignores this order and continues to abuse Harry.

Ravi returns several weeks later and learns that Harry and Kojo have escaped from captivity and reported he and Okie to the police. Sensing that the law is closing in, Ravi attempts to flee the country but is soon arrested for drug dealing and human trafficking in front of a shocked Priya. He reluctantly agrees to become an informant to secure his release. Ravi returns home to learn his relationship has fallen through, but they soon reconcile after Ravi is attacked by Kojo's brother George Knight (Colin Salmon). Ravi is horrified to discover that Jack is now his police handler and is soon abducted by criminals and violently interrogated over allegations he is working for the police. After being released, Jack encourages him to leave Walford to mend his relationships with the criminal underworld.

Ravi returns shortly before New Year's Day 2026. Harry is determined to get revenge on Ravi, who he blames for Teddy's imprisonment, as he had given a false confession to Okie's murder after Harry accidentally killed him. Harry attempts to attack Ravi but is stopped by Nicola, who encourages him to take his time in taking revenge. Nicola and Harry instead spike Ravi's drink, causing him to hallucinate Nish, who tells him he should have died instead. Ravi tries to attack who he thinks is Nish, but ends up brutally assaulting his own son, Nugget. Nugget is rushed into hospital with a bleed on the brain, and Priya is shocked to discover it was Ravi, although she does not tell the police. Ravi is devastated when he recalls it was him who attacked Nugget, and after deducing that Nicola and Harry had drugged him, he bursts into their house with a baseball bat, and following a scuffle with Harry, Priya and George convince him to leave. Overwhelmed with guilt, Ravi uses an injury sustained earlier to begin self-harming. Ravi's secret informing begins to cause strain in his family, and after missing Avani's testimony against Joel in court and being berated by Priya, Ravi self-harms again by burning himself with a lighter. Later when Nugget needs a prescription for epilepsy as he has started having seizures, Ravi holds the pharmacy hostage where Denise and Bea Pollard (Ronni Ancona) are also present, saying he will not leave until the pharmacist finds his medicine. Nugget, mortified, tries to talk him down where eventually, Jack, not wanting his undercover life to be compromised, lets him go home without calling the police. Over the following weeks, Ravi's mental health continues to deteriorate. Following a breakdown and confession to Nugget, Ravi holds his family hostage in their house, and later attempts suicide by jumping from a bridge. Priya and Nugget manage to talk him down, and he is then sectioned. Later, when Priya visits him in hospital he is cold towards her and tells her he doesn't love her before ending their relationship. As part of his therapy Ravi writes a letter which Priya is unaware of and on his return to the square he sleeps with Priya thinking that she has read it. He then ends their relationship a second time before moving out leaving her distraught. Ravi, now engaged to Priya, threatens Max Branning (Jake Wood) when he realises he was Priya's lover but later believes Priya is expecting his child.

== Reception ==
Moeventuallyr arrival, Thiara won the award for Best Soap Newcomer at the 2022 Digital Spy Reader Awards. Thiara won Villain of the Year at the 2023 British Soap Awards, where he was also nominated for Best Newcomer. Later in 2023, he was nominated in the Serial Drama Performance category at the 27th National Television Awards, as well as being nominated for Best Villain at the 2023 Inside Soap Awards. The following year, Thiara was longlisted for "Best Actor" at the 2026 Inside Soap Awards.

== See also ==
- List of soap opera villains
