= Caught in the Draft =

1941 film by David Butler

- Directed by: David Butler
- Written by: Wilkie C. Mahoney; Harry Tugend
- Produced by: Buddy G. DeSylva
- Starring: Bob Hope; Dorothy Lamour; Eddie Bracken
- Cinematography: Karl Struss
- Edited by: Irene Morra
- Music by: Victor Young
- Production company: Paramount Pictures
- Distributed by: Paramount Pictures
- Release date: June 25, 1941
- Running time: 82 minutes
- Country: United States
- Language: English
- Box office: $2.2 million (U.S. and Canada rentals)

Caught in the Draft is a 1941 American comedy film directed by David Butler and starring Bob Hope, Dorothy Lamour and Eddie Bracken. It was produced and distributed by Paramount Pictures. Released six months before the Attack on Pearl Harbor and American entry into World War II it deals with the peacetime draft brought in the previous year as part of the country's mobilization preparations for future war.

== Plot ==
Don Bolton, a vain movie star who fears being drafted into the military, suffers an aversion to loud noises—even fake gunshots on the set. He therefore doubts he would last a day in training. On one occasion, Col. Peter Fairbanks visits the studio as technical consultant on a war film. He brings his beautiful daughter Tony with him. Don plots to marry the colonel's daughter to avoid the draft. After proposing to her, however, he immediately learns that draft eligibility ends at age 31. So Don, who is 32, retracts his proposal. A disgusted Tony accuses him of cowardice.

A few weeks later, Don realizes he's in love with Tony after all. He wants to impress her, so he stages a fake enlistment. But everything backfires, and before he knows it, Don's in the Army, along with his assistant Bert and his manager Steve. At training camp, Col. Fairbanks is CO. He tells Don if he ever gets promoted to corporal, he can marry Tony. But Army life proves almost too much for the trio. Consequently, they endure lots of KP duty as punishment.

Later, when Don and his companions are transferred to a distant base, a camp war game is set up. During the "fighting," Bert alters the signposts in the field in order to help his team. But the result proves disastrous; the men on the opposing team now follow a route into a live artillery range. Don overcomes his fear of noise to rescue the men. He also saves Tony, who is observing the games while riding horseback. After this success, Don is promoted to corporal and is now free to marry Tony.

== Production ==
A 1941 cinema journal describes the air mortar as having been "inaugurated" in the film, stating: "this new development uses air blown under pressure through pipes, as well as powder and pyrotechnics, to gain unusual effects."

== Cast ==
- Bob Hope as Don Bolton
- Dorothy Lamour as Antoinette 'Tony' Fairbanks
- Lynne Overman as Steve Riggs
- Eddie Bracken as Bert Sparks
- Clarence Kolb as Col. Peter Fairbanks
- Paul Hurst as Sgt. Burns
- Ferike Boros as Yetta
- Phyllis Ruth as Margie
- Irving Bacon as Cogswell
- Arthur Loft as Movie director
- Edgar Dearing as Recruiting sergeant
- Frank Marlowe as Pvt. Twitchell
- Eleanor Stewart as Nurse

== Reception ==
The film was a big hit and became Paramount's second most successful release of 1941 after Louisiana Purchase, also starring Bob Hope.

== Bibliography ==
- Bennett, M. Todd. One World, Big Screen: Hollywood, the Allies, and World War II. UNC Press Books, 2012.
- Dick, Bernard F. The Star-Spangled Screen: The American World War II Film. University Press of Kentucky, 2015.
