= Debris mortar =

Movie special effects device

A debris mortar (or air mortar) is a device used to create movie special effects, consisting of pressurized air or gas forced through a tube to propel material (dirt, glass, fake blood) to create a bursting or splattering effect.

A cinema journal from 1941 describes the air mortar as "inaugurated" in the film Caught in the Draft: "this new development utilizes air blown under pressure through pipes, as well as powder and pyrotechnics, to gain unusual effects."

Other debris mortars may employ black powder to launch heavy objects.
