= Aaron Thiara =

English actor (born 1993)

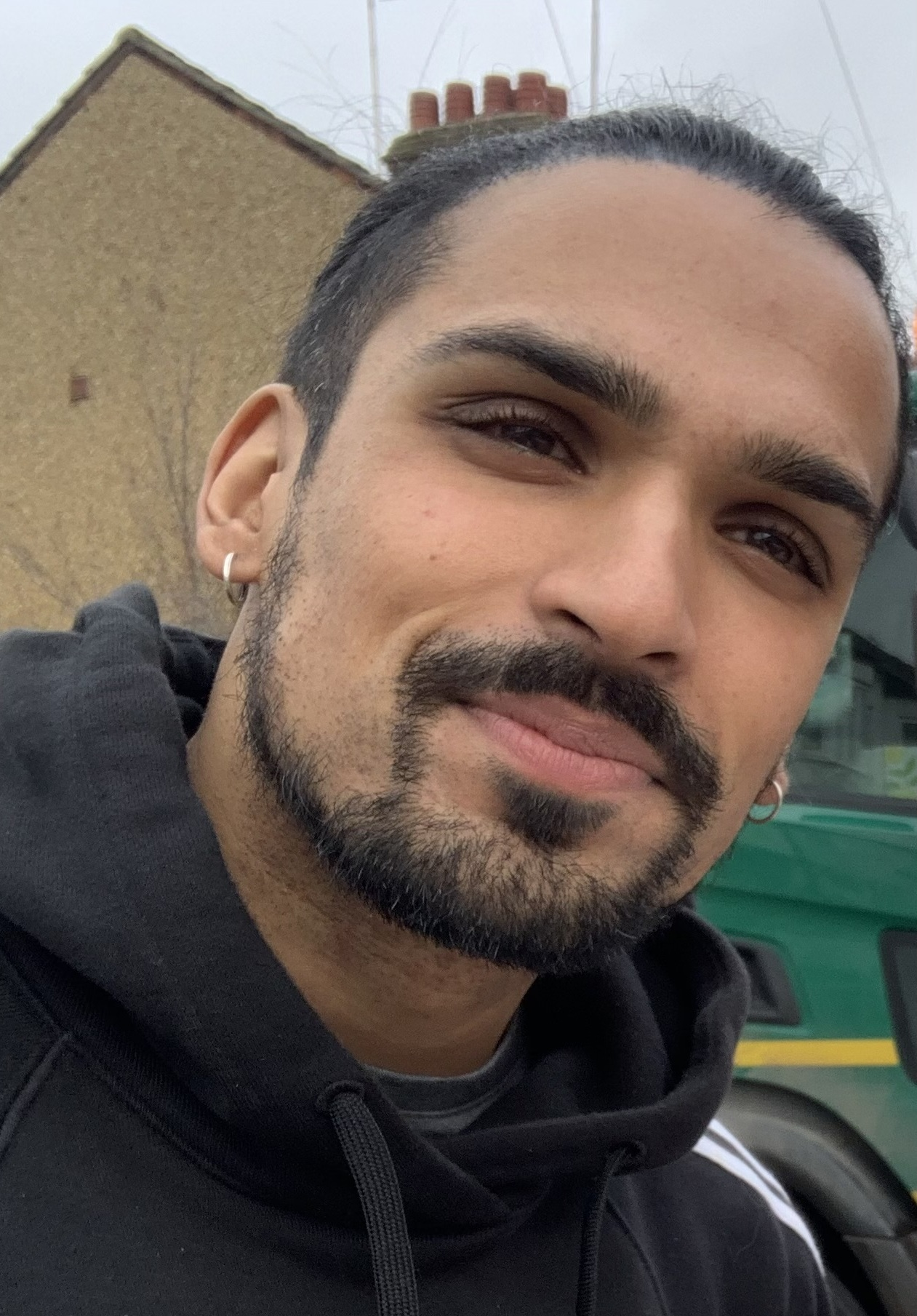
- Thiara in 2023
- Born: Aaron Singh Thiara; 4 May 1993 (age 33); Wolverhampton, West Midlands, England
- Education: East 15 Acting School
- Occupation: Actor
- Years active: 2013–present
- Television: EastEnders
- Website: aaronthiara.com

Aaron Singh Thiara (born 4 May 1993) is a British actor. Thiara rose to prominence in 2022, for his portrayal of Ravi Gulati, in the British television soap opera EastEnders. For his portrayal of the role, he has received nominations at The British Soap Awards for Best Newcomer and in 2023 won Villain of the Year.

== Early life ==
Thiara was born on 4 May 1993 in Wolverhampton, West Midlands. From 2011 to 2014, he trained at the East 15 Acting School in Loughton.

== Career ==
=== 2014–2021: Career beginnings and stage work ===
In Thiara's last year at drama school, he was contracted by the Shakespeare's Globe theatre and appeared in their productions of Antony and Cleopatra and Julius Caesar. He made his screen debut in the 2013 film Team Xtreme. In 2015, Thiara began working as a fight director on various projects, including Bridgerton in 2022.

Thiara appeared in the BBC's television The Boy with the Topknot in 2017, in the role of Hardip. In 2019, he appeared in a production of As You Like It at the Royal Shakespeare Theatre. He also appeared in their production of The Taming of the Shrew later that year.

=== 2022–present: Eastenders ===
In 2022, Thiara was cast in the BBC soap opera EastEnders as villain Ravi Gulati. Months after his arrival, Thiara won the award for Best Soap Newcomer at the 2022 Digital Spy Reader Awards. He has also received two nominations at the 2023 British Soap Awards for Best Newcomer and Villain of the Year.

== Filmography ==
Year	Title	Role	Notes
2013	Team Xtreme	Wally's Mafia	Television film
2014	French Cricket	Burglar	Short film
2015	Deep Water	Josh	Short film
2015	Kensington Tuesday	Benjamin	Short film
2015	Fast N Furious	Coach	Short film
2016	The Factory	Bean Wrestler	Short film
2017	The Boy with the Topknot	Hardip	Television film
2019	Tinder Dad	Sam	Short film
2022–present	EastEnders	Ravi Gulati	Regular role

== Stage ==
Year	Title	Role	Venue
2014	Antony and Cleopatra	Ensemble	Shakespeare's Globe
2014	Julius Caesar	Ensemble	Shakespeare's Globe
2016	Gangsta Granny	Ensemble	Birmingham Stage Company
2018	Invisible	Yousef	Future Theatre
2018	90 Days	Sudesh	Future Theatre
2019	As You Like It	Jacques de Bois / Dennis	Royal Shakespeare Company
2019	The Taming of the Shrew	Servant of Petruchia	International tour
2020	As You Like It	Orlando	Royal Shakespeare Company

== Awards and nominations ==
Year	Award	Category	Result	Ref.
2022	Digital Spy Reader Awards	Best Soap Newcomer	Won	
2023	British Soap Awards	Best Newcomer	Nominated	
2023	British Soap Awards	Villain of the Year	Won	
2023	National Television Awards	Serial Drama Performance	Nominated	
2023	Inside Soap Awards	Best Villain	Nominated	
