= James Bye =

British actor (born 1984)

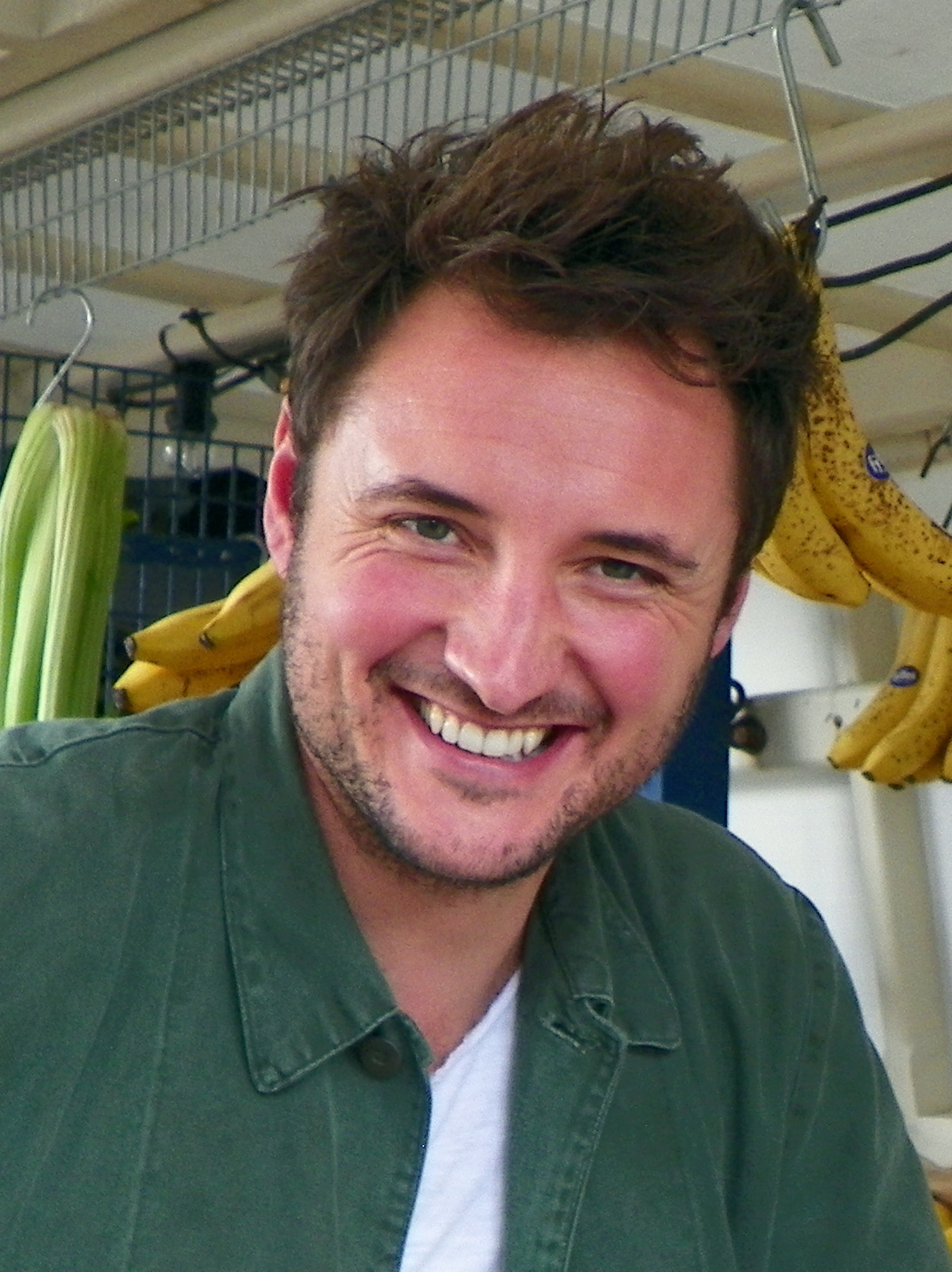
- Bye in 2016
- Born: James Edward Bye; 23 February 1984 (age 42); Basingstoke, Hampshire, England
- Occupation: Actor
- Years active: 2006–present
- Known for: Role of Martin Fowler in EastEnders
- Spouse: Victoria Bye (m. 2012)
- Children: 4

James Edward Bye (born 23 February 1984) is an English actor who played Martin Fowler in EastEnders from 2014 to 2025. He also competed in series 20 of Strictly Come Dancing in 2022.

== Early life ==
James Edward Bye was born on 23 February 1984 in Basingstoke, to parents Leonard and Pauline. He has a younger sister. Bye attended the Hurst Community College in Baughurst, before enrolling at Queen Mary's College in Basingstoke.

== Career ==
Bye's first acting role was in a 2006 episode of the television series The Bill as Tom Burrows. He later had a part in the film Cemetery Junction in 2010, followed by appearances in the films Hummingbird (2013) and The Hooligan Factory (2014), as well as the miniseries The Great Train Robbery (2013). In October 2014, Bye was cast in the role of Martin Fowler in the BBC One soap opera EastEnders. His character was killed off during the live episode of the show's 40th anniversary on 20 February 2025, with Bye consequently departing the series. In 2022, he competed in series 20 of the dancing show Strictly Come Dancing. He played Mr. Darcy in the stage adaptation of P. D. James's mystery novel Death Comes to Pemberley (a sequel to Jane Austen's Pride and Prejudice), which toured the UK from 1 May to 13 September 2025.

== Personal life ==
Bye married his wife Victoria in 2012.. The couple have four sons.

== Filmography ==
Film
Year	Title	Role
2010	Cemetery Junction	Tough Guy in Club
2013	Hummingbird	Football Supporter 2
2014	The Hooligan Factory	Pete The Killer

Television
Year	Title	Role	Notes
2006	The Bill	Tom Burrows	Episode: "Special Relationships"
2013	The Great Train Robbery	John Daly	Episodes: "A Robber's Tale" and "A Copper's Tale"
2014–2025	EastEnders	Martin Fowler	Regular role; 1,048 episodes
2016	Children in Need 2016	Performer	Segment: "Film Tribute"
2020	Pointless Celebrities	Himself / Contestant	Episode: "Soaps"
2020	EastEnders: Secrets from the Square	Himself	Episode: "Martin and Kush"
2021	The Wall Versus Celebrities	Himself / Contestant	Episode: "EastEnders Christmas Special"
2022	Strictly Come Dancing	Himself / Contestant	Series 20
2023	The Hit List	Himself / Contestant	Episode: "Strictly Come Dancing Special"
2023	Richard Osman's House of Games	Himself / Contestant	Series 7 (Week 9)
2024	The Weakest Link	Himself / Contestant	Episode: "Strictly Come Dancing Special"
2025	Homes Under the Hammer	Himself / Presenter	Episode: "Celebrity Special with Martel and James Bye"

== Stage ==
Year	Title	Role	Notes
2025 2026	Death Comes to Pemberley Paranormal Activity	Mr. Darcy James	UK tour Richmond Theatre

== Awards and nominations ==
Year	Award	Category	Work	Result	Ref.
2016	British Soap Awards	Best Actor	EastEnders	Longlisted	
2016	Inside Soap Awards	Best Actor	EastEnders	Longlisted	
2016	Inside Soap Awards	Best Partnership (with Lacey Turner)	EastEnders	Shortlisted	
2017	British Soap Awards	Best On-Screen Partnership (with Lacey Turner)	EastEnders	Nominated	
2017	Digital Spy Reader Awards	Best Soap Relationship (with Lacey Turner)	EastEnders	Third	
2020	National Television Awards	Serial Drama Performance	EastEnders	Longlisted	
2020	Inside Soap Awards	Best Actor	EastEnders	Longlisted	
2022	Inside Soap Awards	Best Double Act (with James Farrar)	EastEnders	Longlisted	
2025	Inside Soap Awards	Best Exit	EastEnders	Won	
