= Micah Balfour =

English actor (born 1978)

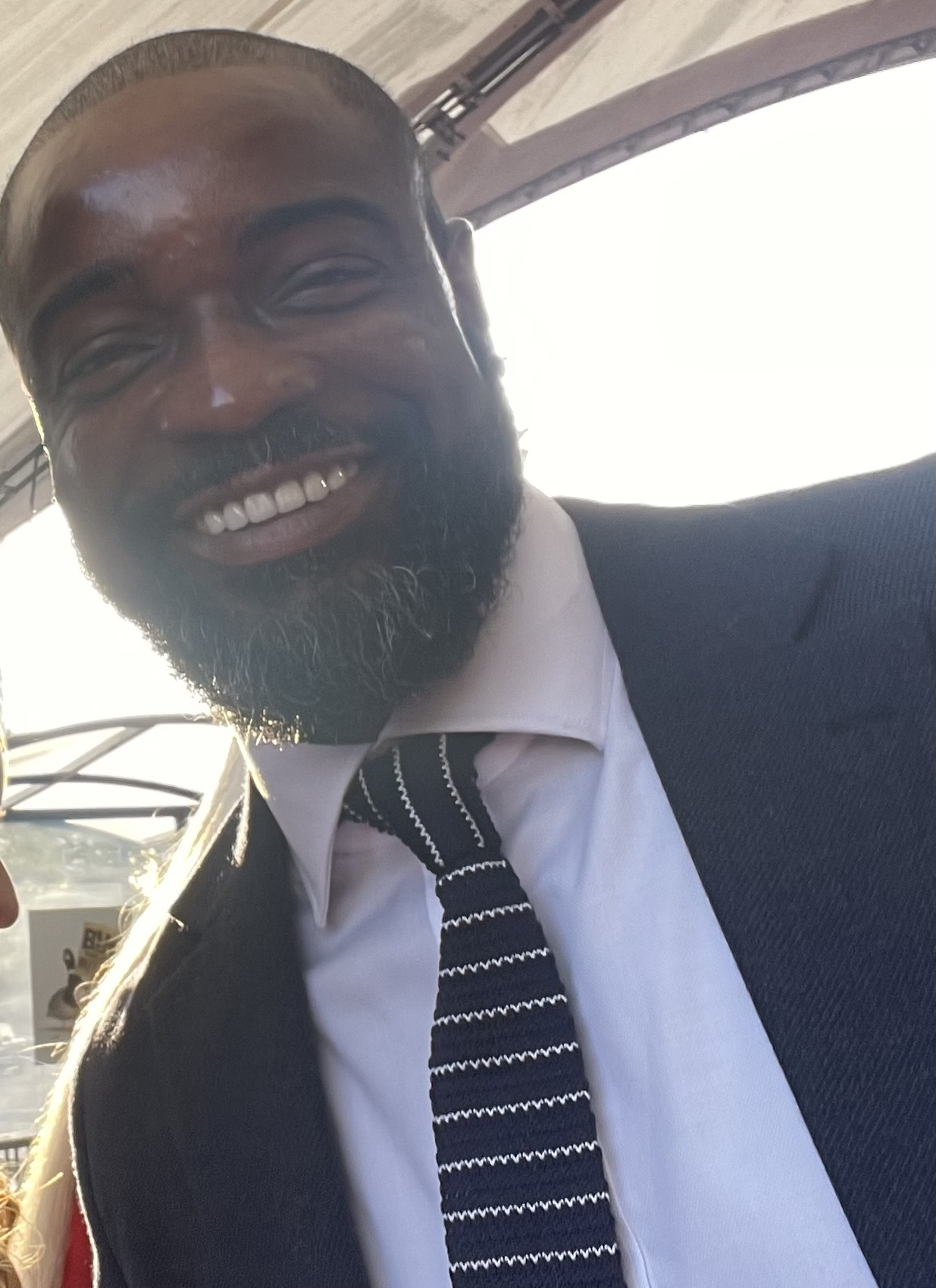
- Balfour in 2024
- Born: 18 July 1978 (age 47); Peckham, London, England
- Occupation: Actor
- Years active: 2005–present
- Television: The Bill; Emmerdale; EastEnders

Micah Balfour (born 18 July 1978) is an English actor. He is known for his roles as PC Benjamin Gayle in the ITV police drama The Bill, Jermaine Bailey in the ITV soap opera Emmerdale, Junior Knight in the BBC soap opera EastEnders and Leyton in the BBC series Phoenix Rise.

== Career ==
Balfour began his career in the ITV police drama The Bill, appearing as Asher Campbell between 2005 and 2006. In 2007, he began portraying a different character in a regular role, as PC Benjamin Gayle until the show's cancellation in 2010. Balfour's theatre credits in include The Royal Hunt of the Sun and Market Boy at the Royal National Theatre (2006), and Absolute Beginners at The Lyric Hammersmith (2007).

Between 2015 and 2016, Balfour portrayed Dr Jermaine Bailey in the ITV soap opera Emmerdale.

In 2023, he guest starred in an episode of Death in Paradise and appeared in the drama series The Gold. In April 2024, it was announced Balfour would be joining the cast of the BBC soap opera EastEnders, as Junior Knight, the estranged son of established character George Knight (Colin Salmon). He is set to make his final appearance in late 2025 after being written out by executive producer Ben Wadey.

== Filmography ==
Year	Title	Role	Notes
2005–2006	The Bill	Asher Campbell	Recurring role
2007–2010	The Bill	PC Benjamin Gayle	Main role
2007	The Time of Your Life	Boris	5 episodes
2010	Doctor Who	Co-pilot	Episode: "A Christmas Carol"
2011	Holy Flying Circus	Black Panther	Television film
2015	Silent Witness	Daniel Garvey	Episode: "Protection"
2015–2016	Emmerdale	Jermaine Bailey	Regular role
2017	Holby City	Leonard "Lenny" Dujon	1 episode
2017	The Children Act	Mr Blackwell	Film
2023	Death in Paradise	Roy Hamilton	Episode: "#12.5"
2023	The Gold	Keith Potts	2 episodes
2023	John Wick: Chapter 4	Myrmidon	Film
2024	Nightsleeper	Leon Parhill	Main role
2024–2025	EastEnders	Junior Knight	Regular role
2024	Phoenix Rise	Leyton	Recurring role
