= Ellie Dadd =

English actress (born 2005)

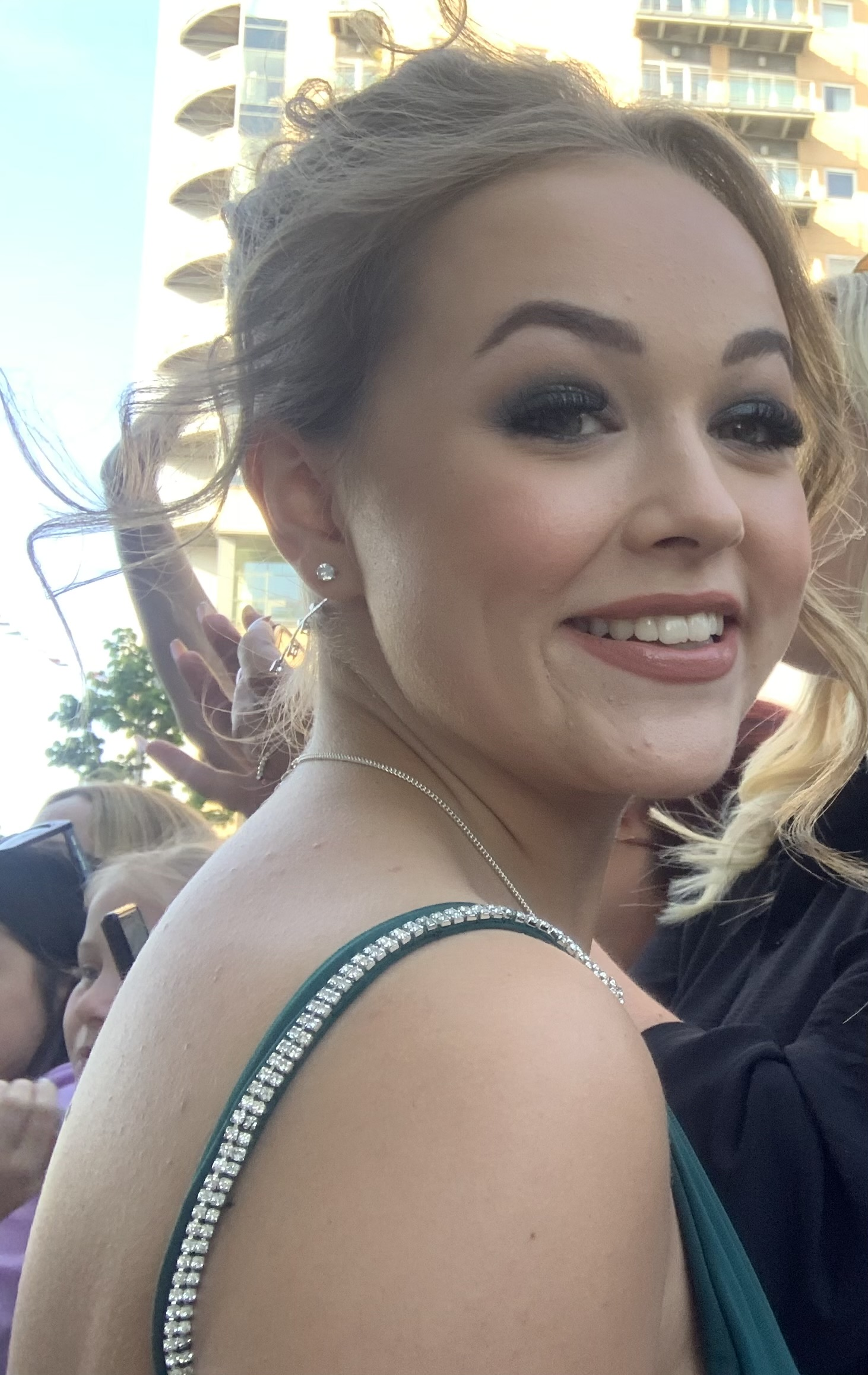
- Dadd in 2023
- Born: Ellie Charlotte Dadd; 15 March 2005 (age 21); Bromley, London, England
- Occupation: Actress
- Years active: 2013–present
- Television: Silent Witness; EastEnders

Ellie Charlotte Dadd (born 15 March 2005) is an English actress, known for portraying the role of Amy Mitchell on the BBC soap opera EastEnders since 2022.

== Early life ==
Ellie Charlotte Dadd was born on 15 March 2005 in Bromley, London. She has been training at the D&B Academy of Performing Arts since childhood.

== Career ==
In 2013, at the age of eight, Dadd made her acting debut as Sophia in the short film Lipstick, about a brother and sister playing at their grandma's house until they realise she has died and have to deal with her death on their own. In 2016, Dadd played Amanda Thripp in the West End production of Matilda the Musical.

In January 2020, Dadd appeared in two episodes of the BBC crime drama Silent Witness as Cat Shaw, the daughter of Jenny and Robbie, the former of whom is found dead on the train tracks and is later found to be the victim of domestic violence at the hands of Cat's father. In March 2022, Dadd appeared in the first episode of the seventh series of ITV detective drama Grantchester.

In August 2022, Dadd joined the cast of the BBC soap opera EastEnders as Amy Mitchell. She took over the role from Abbie Burke, who had played the part of Amy for eight years, with bosses deciding to recast the character to allow the writers to tackle more sensitive and mature storylines. Early in Dadd's tenure, the character of Amy was placed at the centre of a self-harm storyline which results in her being hospitalised and subsequently attending therapy sessions.

== Filmography ==
Year	Title	Role	Notes	Ref.
2013	Lipstick	Sophia	Short film	
2020	Silent Witness	Cat Shaw	Recurring role	
2022	Grantchester	Unknown	1 episode	
2022–present	EastEnders	Amy Mitchell	Regular role	
2025	EastEnders Investigates: The Manosphere	Herself	Documentary	

== Stage ==
Year	Title	Role	Venue	Ref.
2016	Matilda the Musical	Amanda Thripp	Cambridge Theatre	
