= Dayo Koleosho =

English actor (born 1984)

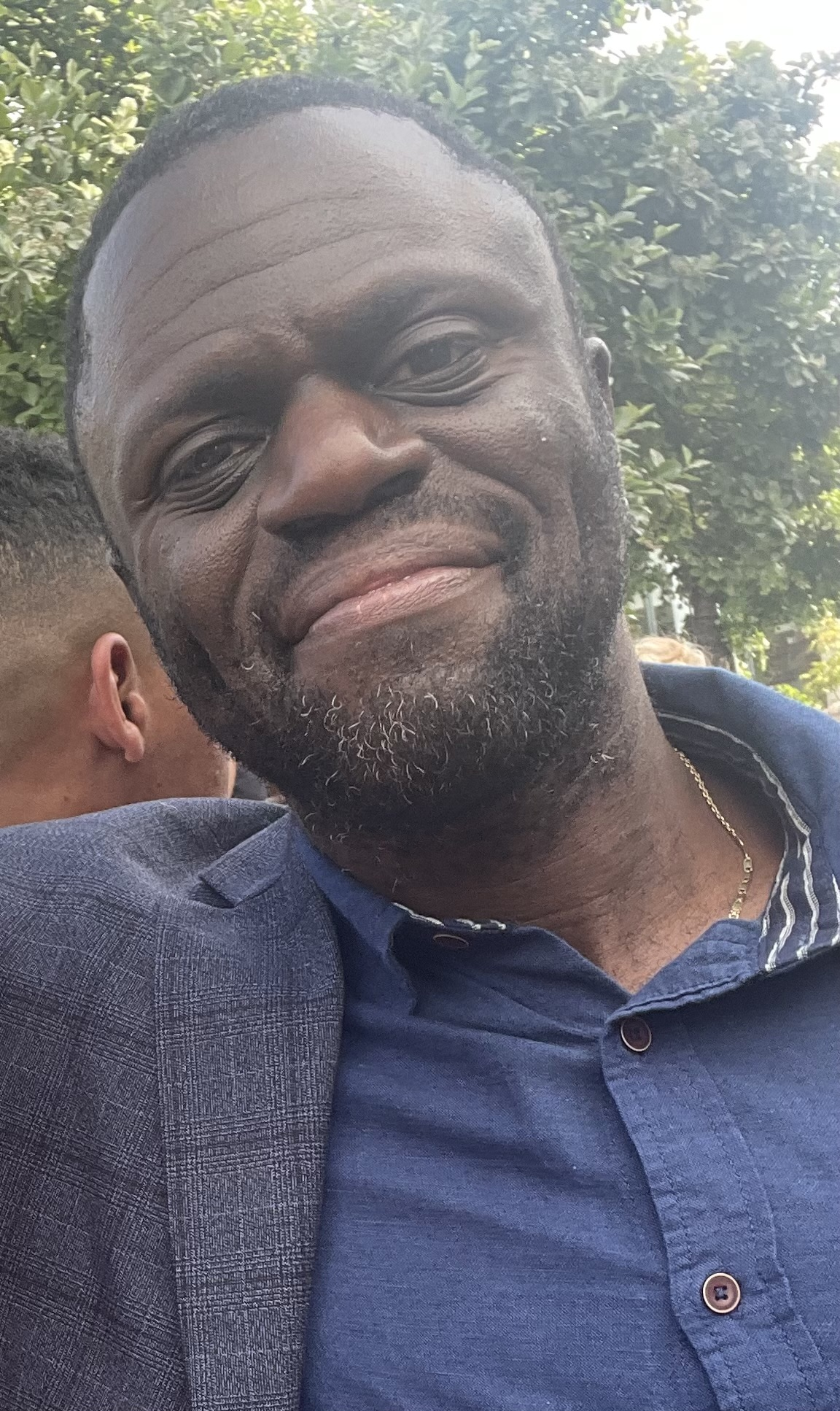
- Koleosho in 2025
- Born: Oludayo Koleosho; 1984 (age 41–42); Stoke Newington, Hackney, England
- Education: Royal Central School of Speech and Drama
- Occupation: Actor
- Years active: 2010–present

Oludayo Koleosho (born 1984) is an English actor. After making appearances in the BBC medical series Holby City and Doctors, he embarked on a theatre career. Koleosho appeared in various theatre productions before returning to television, appearing in Strike and Casualty. Then in 2024, he was cast in the BBC soap opera EastEnders as Kojo Asare.

== Early life ==
Oludayo Koleosho was born in 1984 in Stoke Newington in the London Borough of Hackney. He is autistic. He attended Access All Areas, a theatre group in Hackney for adults with learning disabilities led by the Royal Central School of Speech and Drama.

== Career ==
Koleosho made his professional acting debut in a 2010 episode of the BBC medical drama series Holby City. A year later, he appeared in fellow BBC medical series Doctors. He appeared alongside Access All Areas classmate Yvonne Swift in a storyline that saw them portray a married couple. The pair had their first on-screen kiss with each other, to which Koleosho said: "I had to kiss Yvonne. At first I thought 'oh no', but you just have to get on with it". In 2014, he made his stage debut in Eye Queue Hear, which toured the UK.

In 2016, Koleosho appeared in an episode of the Channel 4 sitcom Damned. In 2018, he performed in Madness at the Lowry Theatre, as well as #crazyfuturelove at the Battersea Arts Centre a year later. In 2019 and again from 2021 to 2024, Koleosho toured the UK and Europe in productions of Faith, Hope and Charity. In 2022, he had a recurring role in the BBC drama series Strike, appearing in the BBC's medical drama Casualty the following year. In 2024, he was cast in the BBC soap opera EastEnders. Appearing in the regular role of Kojo Asare, he made his first appearance on 27 August 2024. He was introduced as the brother of established character George Knight (Colin Salmon).

== Filmography ==
Year	Title	Role	Notes
2010	Holby City	Billy Knight	Episode: "Dandelions"
2011	Doctors	Michael Dunham	Episode: "Coming of Age"
2016	Damned	Dave	Guest role
2022	Strike	Samhain Athorn	Recurring role
2023	Casualty	Jay Henderson	Episode: "Tinderbox"
2024–present	EastEnders	Kojo Asare	Regular role

== Stage ==
Year	Title	Venue
2014	Eye Queue Hear	UK tour
2015	Behind Closed Drawers	Black Cab Theatre
2015	Elexion	Theatre503
2017	Masha and the Firebird	Sleepless Theatre
2018	Madhouse	Lowry Theatre
2019	#crazyfuturelove	Battersea Arts Centre
2019, 2021–2024	Faith, Hope and Charity	West End, European tour
2022–2022	UnReal City	Brighton Dome
2021	Jitney	Leeds Playhouse
2022	Jitney	The Old Vic
2023	Imposter 22	Royal Court Theatre
