= Teddy Mitchell =

Fictional character from EastEnders

- EastEnders character
- Portrayed by: Roland Manookian
- Duration: 2024–2026
- First appearance: Episode 6931; 26 June 2024
- Last appearance: Episode 7385; 18 August 2026
- Introduced by: Chris Clenshaw (2024); Ben Wadey (2026)
In-universe information
- Other names: Edward Mitchell
- Occupation: Businessman
- Family: Mitchell
- Father: Stevie Mitchell
- Mother: Connie Mitchell
- Half-brothers: Charlie Mitchell; Billy Mitchell
- Wife: Nicola Mitchell (until 2024)
- Sons: Harry Mitchell
- Adoptive sons: Barney Mitchell
- Grandsons: Ethan Branning-Panesar
- Nephews: Dan Pearce; Jamie Mitchell; Will Mitchell
- Nieces: Janet Mitchell
- Other relatives: Lola Pearce; Lexi Pearce; Phil Mitchell; Grant Mitchell; Ben Mitchell

Teddy Mitchell is a fictional character from the BBC soap opera EastEnders, played by Roland Manookian. Teddy was introduced by executive producer Chris Clenshaw in episode 6931, broadcast on 26 June 2024, and made his final appearance on 11 December 2025, with a one-off guest appearance on 18 August 2026, as the head of an extension to the soap's established Mitchell family. The character debuted alongside his sons Harry (Elijah Holloway) and Barney Mitchell (Lewis Bridgeman), and was initially billed as a charming and strong-willed, but cunning presence. The character, alongside his two sons, were first announced on 6 June 2024. Throughout his time on the serial, Teddy has been depicted as a charming and confident father who is fiercely protective over his sons, but with a more sinister side hidden beneath. After being cast, Manookian was both surprised and excited to have received the role, describing Teddy as an interesting part to "get [his] teeth into".

His storylines in the series have included his arrival in search of his father Stevie Mitchell (Alan Ford) and his discovery that Stevie had another family, his relationship with Sharon Watts (Letitia Dean), the arrival and later reunion with his ex-wife Nicola Mitchell (Laura Doddington), discovering that his son Barney is not his following Nicola's affair with Sharon's half brother Zack Hudson (James Farrar) and taking the blame for Harry stabbing Tobias "Okie" Okyere (Aayan Ibikunle Shoderu) in self-defence. Teddy's enigmatic personality attracted praise from both viewers and critics.

== Development ==
=== Casting and creation ===
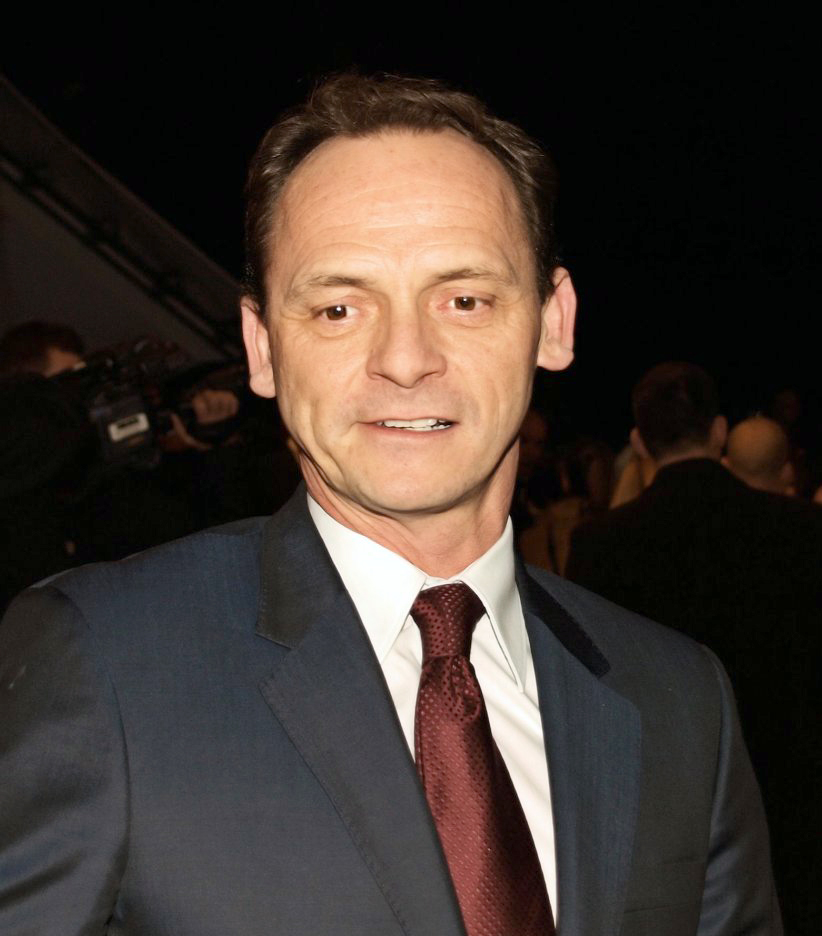
Teddy was introduced as the secret half brother of Billy Mitchell (Perry Fenwick; pictured).

On 6 June 2024, it was first announced that three new characters were to be introduced. Billed as secret relatives of Stevie Mitchell (Alan Ford) and extensions to the soap's Mitchell family, the trio included Teddy, to be played by Roland Manookian, and his two sons Harry (Elijah Holloway) and Barney Mitchell (Lewis Bridgeman). Manookian said that after his audition he didn't believe he would receive the part, and initially ignored calls from his agent as a result. Upon his casting, Manookian expressed his excitement to join the soap, having watched it from a young age. Manookian was also enthusiastic to be cast as a member of the Mitchell family. Describing them as a "stalwart" unit, he added that being a member of the Mitchell family meant he had "big shoes to fill", but he was willing to accept the challenge. Having watched since childhood, he described being on-set as "surreal". The show's executive producer Chris Clenshaw was excited to introduce "a new branch of the iconic Mitchell family" to the show's setting, Walford. Clenshaw also teased that Teddy and his sons would quickly be "thrust into the drama".

Details preceding their arrival said they would arrive in search of Stevie, only to learn that Stevie had another family. Their arrival would cause tension among the Mitchell family, being met with fury from Phil Mitchell (Steve McFadden). It was teased to be a "seismic shock" for Teddy's half-brother Billy Mitchell (Perry Fenwick), as he was unaware of his father's other family, with the arrival to cause "turmoil" for him. Teddy, Harry, and Barney were set to arrive in the show later in June. They made their first appearances in the episode airing on 26 June 2024.

=== Characterisation ===
When Teddy's character was announced, Manookian called Teddy an "old school" and "enigmatic" figure, who was nevertheless aware of the contemporary. He concluded that Teddy is a traditional and stoic man, and as a result, he is intelligent enough to adjust. Manookian added that his character was incredibly astute in business and, as a "strong family man", had a deep understanding for his family's needs, as well as how to be there for and protect them. Manookian said he enjoyed playing Teddy as "he's a very strong-willed man" with few weaknesses, but was also charming, humble, and respectful. In Manookian's words: "he's got a very good way with people". Manookian observed that Harry and Barney inherited some of Teddy's characteristics, namely being strategic and tactical. The actor teased Teddy would cause "loads of trouble" for the show's residents, driven by his goal to achieve the greatest possible result for himself. Despite his charm, as a Mitchell, conflict "follows" Teddy. Laura Morgan of What's on TV labeled the character as "cunning". The character moved into Walford as he was "desperate to make a fresh start with his boys". Following his arrival, Teddy's past is left "murky", with Susannah Alexander of Digital Spy noting how the character uses "extravagant gestures" to conceal his secrets. Radio Times writer Laura Denby called Teddy both "charming" and "shifty".

=== Relationships ===
Explaining the backstory between Teddy and his father Stevie, Manookian said the two had a "rocky" relationship, but as Teddy aged, Stevie became progressively "more influential in his life". As their history detailed an on-off amount of contact between the pair, Manookian said there were "renaissances" of their relationship. The actor also detailed that Teddy's respect for Stevie escalated after having his own children, as it allowed him to better understand the sacrifices that came with parenting. Despite this, Teddy was said to have "some repairing to do" regarding his relationship with Stevie. After arriving in Walford and meeting Phil, Manookian said Teddy would be shocked by his aggressive response to his arrival, but would try to stay calm and work things out. Despite this, he considered the characters as being "two bulls locking horns" due to being different types of "alpha male". He explained this as being because Phil is more aggressive and assertive compared to Teddy being just as dangerous, but more strategic and courteous. Discussing Billy's reaction to learning about Teddy, Manookian sympathised with Billy and justified his reaction as being "a hell of a lot to take in".

In October 2024, it was announced that Teddy's ex-wife Nicola Mitchell (Laura Doddington) would be introduced to the soap, with her arrival being teased to be a shock for Teddy. Her introduction followed several ominous mentions in the show. Despite Teddy being reluctant to see her again, due to her arrival breaking the illusion of the family's fresh start, Nicola is determined to stay in Walford regardless. Clenshaw explained that Teddy and Nicola had a "complicated history", which he expressed excitement to explore. Doddington explained their history, including the two meeting while they were young, growing up together and discovering their true selves while dating. As a result, they knew each other very closely and were able to "press each other's buttons" while predicting the outcome. Doddington commented on the present relationship between Teddy and Nicola, explaining that her character wanted to get back together with Teddy, despite admitting that they were a dysfunctional couple and Teddy had since lost interest in her. She added that Nicola would be angry about losing her ability to manipulate and remain two steps ahead of him.

=== Departure ===
In December 2025, Manookian's departure was announced. A spokesperson for the soap told Radio Times that Manookian would "be leaving EastEnders this year, and we wish him all the best for the future." A report from The Sun disclosed the soap had felt the character had run its course. He exited during the episode aired on 11 December, after Teddy was sentenced to life imprisonment for taking responsibility for the murder of Tobias "Okie" Okyere (Aayan Ibikunle Shoderu). Teddy made a one-off return appearance on 18 August 2026.

== Storylines ==
After Stevie Mitchell (Alan Ford) is hospitalised, Teddy is contacted as he is the next of kin and he arrives at the hospital with his sons Harry (Elijah Holloway) and Barney Mitchell (Lewis Bridgeman). They explore Walford, where Teddy breaks into the home of Billy Mitchell (Perry Fenwick), where Stevie was knocked out, for clues, but is caught by Billy's wife Honey Mitchell (Emma Barton) and ordered to leave. Once Stevie is discharged from the hospital, the Mitchell family meets in The Queen Victoria public house, with Teddy, Harry, and Barney joining. After receiving pushback, Stevie reveals to everyone that Teddy is his son, and by extension, Billy's half-brother. After everyone's initial shock from the revelation calms down, Teddy slowly builds friendships with Billy and the remainder of the family.

Teddy begins flirting with Sharon Watts (Letitia Dean), to the reluctance of her ex-husband and Teddy's relative Phil Mitchell (Steve McFadden). After Reiss Colwell (Jonny Freeman) falls into debt with Phil and Sharon, Phil puts together that Reiss is conning him, and furiously threatens him. Teddy calms Phil down before making a deal with Reiss to cover the debt. Following a misunderstanding, Ravi Gulati (Aaron Thiara) endangers Barney by dangling him over the edge of a bridge. As revenge for crossing the family, Teddy and Harry burn down his family's call centre. Still traumatised by the incident, Barney attempts to contact his mother, and Teddy's ex-wife Nicola Mitchell (Laura Doddington). She later arrives in Walford, to Teddy's fury, attempting to reconnect with her sons after spending time in prison. Once Teddy and Sharon attempt to move forward with their relationship, Teddy's frustration with Nicola grows as she makes persistent attempts to sabotage them.

Following the explosion at the Queen Vic during the 40th anniversary week, Teddy's son Barney is injured and later develops an infection. After Zack Hudson (James Farrar) accompanies him to hospital, Zack works out from overhearing a discussion about Barney's blood type that he is, in fact, Barney's biological father, not Teddy. Zack pressures Nicola to tell Teddy the truth, but she refuses, and, in an attempt to silence him, has him attacked in Harry's Barn. Later, following a confrontation between Sharon and Nicola, Barney reveals to Teddy that Sharon slept with her ex-husband, Phil's brother Grant (Ross Kemp), believing this to be the reason that Sharon punched Nicola. In a fit of rage, Teddy attacks Zack leading to Nicola claiming Teddy is responsible for Harry's girlfriend Shireen going missing. Teddy and Nicola ultimately resume their relationship, but it is short-lived when it emerges that Nicola murdered Shireen; Harry later discovers this and moves out. In an attempt to run away with Barney, Zack reveals the truth to Harry who tells Teddy. After Harry kidnaps Zack, Teddy attempts to drive him home, leading to a car crash into a body of water. Presuming Zack drowned, Teddy returns home and the truth is revealed to Barney by Sharon's half sister, Vicki Fowler (Alice Haig). Zach is revealed to have survived and ultimately returns to Walford to confront the Mitchells, but Barney chooses to stay with Teddy and Nicola. Tensions continue to rise, however, resulting in Teddy eventually comes to terms with Barney's true parentage and supports Barney as he begins to form a relationship with Zach.

For months Teddy remains unaware that Harry and his friend Kojo Asare (Dayo Koleosho) have been forced to deliver drugs for Ravi and Tobias "Okie" Okyere (Aayan Ibikunle Shoderu). When Teddy finally discovers what Harry is being forced to do, he plants a hidden camera in their flat in an attempt to get evidence but Kojo accidentally shows Okie. Teddy notices Harry is missing and begins searching for him and Kojo in Cardiff unaware Okie has chained him up in their flat and forcefully injected with heroin. Teddy and George Knight (Colin Salmon) eventually discover the true extent of what has gone on and call the police just as Harry escapes, though Okie is able to clear the flat of evidence in time. He returns and threatens Harry and Kojo resulting in a fight that causes Harry to accidentally stab Okie, killing him. Harry tells Teddy, who immediately decides to take the blame for himself and shares a tearful goodbye with Nicola, before telling the police he stabbed Okie in self-defence. Pleading guilty, he is given a lifetime sentence, with the possibility of parole after serving a minimum of 20 years. Before being transferred to a prison in Durham, Teddy makes a plea to Billy to look after his family and issues a warning that Nicola is poison.

In August 2026, on the death anniversary of Nicola's father, Teddy calls her from prison. However, George answers. Teddy tells him that Nicola has a reason for being so distant on the anniversary, and that he can't tell him, but he tells George that if Nicola truly loves him, she will tell him herself. Nicola eventually reveals to George that her mother blames her for her father's death.

== Reception ==
Molly Moss of Radio Times called the character's introduction a "dramatic entrance". Her colleague, Laura Denby, wrote that Teddy's first appearance was a "memorable" and "captivating" debut for the character, expressing interest in seeing more from him. Entertainment Daily writer Joel Harley commented that Teddy had quickly become popular among viewers following his introduction. He displayed positive Twitter reactions praising the character's potential. In August 2024, Rachel Lucas of What's on TV wrote that Teddy had been an "enigma" since his arrival, due to his mysterious past. Denby found Teddy and his initial secrets "intriguing", and wrote that Teddy's revenge against Ravi, by burning down the call centre, was "carefully considered" and "shocking".
