= List of EastEnders characters introduced in 2024 =

EastEnders logo

EastEnders is a BBC soap opera that first aired on 19 February 1985. The following is a list of characters that first appeared in 2024, in order of first appearance. All characters are introduced by the show's executive producer, Chris Clenshaw. The first characters to be introduced are Eddie Knight (Christopher Fairbank) and Gloria Knight (Elizabeth Counsell), the adoptive parents of George Knight (Colin Salmon). Harold Martin (David Sterne), the husband of Aunt Sal (Anna Karen), and Logan (Liam Hatch), a bully who attacks Denzel Danes (Jaden Ladega), appear in one episode each during January. Britney Wainwright (Lola Campbell), a teenager who is supported by Whitney Dean (Shona McGarty), joins the recurring cast in March. Her mother, Keeley Wainwright (Kirsty J Curtis), also appears in a guest capacity. Warren Finn (Neil Roberts), a barrister, appears in four episodes in April and September. Levi (Mark Akintimehin), a church elder, appears in multiple episodes across the year from April.

Junior Knight (Micah Balfour), the estranged son of George Knight, is introduced in May, followed by his wife Monique Knight (Busayo Ige) and son Xavier Knight (Chase Dean-Williams). Maya Houssain (Bharti Patel) was introduced in May for a story with Harvey Monroe (Ross Boatman). In June, an extension of the Mitchell family – Teddy Mitchell (Roland Manookian), Harry Mitchell (Elijah Holloway) and Barney Mitchell (Lewis Bridgeman) – made their debut. Brenda and Hugh Collins (Nichola McAuliffe and Michael Bertenshaw), the parents of Debbie Colwell (Jenny Meier), appear from July. The following month, Ayesha Siddhu (Laila Rouass), an old friend of Suki Panesar (Balvinder Sopal), and Kobina Asare (Jonathan Nyati), the brother of George Knight, guest appear. Ninette Finch also debuted as Beryl, an extra. Kojo Asare (Dayo Koleosho), the brother of George and Kobina, also joins the regular cast. Nicola Mitchell (Laura Doddington), the former wife of Teddy Mitchell, was introduced in November. Additionally, multiple other characters were featured during the year.

== Eddie Knight ==
Eddie Knight
- EastEnders character
- Portrayed by: Christopher Fairbank
- Duration: 2024, 2026
- First appearance: Episode 6831; 1 January 2024
- Last appearance: Episode 7342; 4 June 2026
- Introduced by: Chris Clenshaw (2024); Ben Wadey (2026)
In-universe information
- Wife: Gloria Knight (until 2024)
- Adoptive sons: George Knight
- Grandsons: Junior Knight (adoptive)
- Granddaughters: Gina Knight (adoptive); Anna Knight (adoptive); Ivy Knight-Mitchell (adoptive)

Eddie Knight, played by Christopher Fairbank, first appears in episode 6831, originally broadcast on 1 January 2024. The character and Fairbank's casting details were announced on 10 December 2023. Eddie is introduced with his wife, Gloria Knight (Elizabeth Counsell), as the adoptive parents of established character George Knight (Colin Salmon). Fairbank and Counsell were contracted for a short stint. The characters' backstory states that Eddie and Gloria have not seen George for over a decade. Chris Clenshaw, the show's executive producer, explained that it would "[become] apparent why George has kept his distance".

The characters' arrival proves a surprise for George and they are introduced with a secret. Clenshaw teased that Eddie and Gloria would be "thrust into the heart of the drama" upon their introduction. Fairbank expressed his joy at joining the show and working with the cast. Clenshaw was excited about the casting of the "legendary and immensely talented" Fairbank and Counsell. Producers used the characters of Eddie, Gloria and George to explore the topic of baby farming. To ensure the story was portrayed sensitively and accurately, the show worked with experts and those with lived experiences of farming. Through the story, Eddie's "racist ideologies" are also examined and result in clashes with his family. Clenshaw opined that the story follows EastEnders' tradition of "telling challenging yet truthful stories". He added that the story would challenge George "to question the identity his parents gave him from childhood as he discovers the true means by which he was adopted".

The character is killed-off on 4 June 2026 after suffering terminal lung cancer. He dies after choking to death on his medication, and George, sick of Eddie's racist abuse, refuses to help him.

== Gloria Knight ==
Gloria Knight
- EastEnders character
- Portrayed by: Elizabeth Counsell
- First appearance: Episode 6831; 1 January 2024
- Last appearance: Episode 6890; 11 April 2024
- Introduced by: Chris Clenshaw
In-universe information
- Brothers: Gordon
- Husband: Eddie Knight (until 2024)
- Adoptive sons: George Knight
- Granddaughters: Gina Knight (adoptive); Anna Knight (adoptive)

Gloria Knight, played by Elizabeth Counsell, first appears in episode 6831, originally broadcast on 1 January 2024. The character and Counsell's casting details were announced on 10 December 2023. Gloria is introduced with her husband, Eddie Knight (Christopher Fairbank), as the adoptive parents of established character George Knight (Colin Salmon). Counsell and Fairbank were contracted for a short stint. The characters' backstory states that Gloria and Eddie have not seen George for over a decade. Chris Clenshaw, the show's executive producer, explained that it would "[become] apparent why George has kept his distance". Counsell expressed her joy at joining the show and working with the cast and crew. She was looking forward to working with Salmon again, having previously worked together almost thirty years prior. Clenshaw was excited about the casting of the "legendary and immensely talented" Counsell and Fairbank.

The characters' arrival proves a surprise for George and they are introduced with a secret. Clenshaw teased that Gloria and Eddie would be "thrust into the heart of the drama" upon their introduction. Producers used the characters of Gloria, Eddie and George to explore the topic of baby farming. To ensure the story was portrayed sensitively and accurately, the show worked with experts and those with lived experiences of farming. Clenshaw opined that the story follows EastEnders' tradition of "telling challenging yet truthful stories". He added that the story would challenge George "to question the identity his parents gave him from childhood as he discovers the true means by which he was adopted". The character was written out of the series in episode 6890, originally broadcast on 11 April 2024. Gloria was killed off after suffering a heart attack, having reunited with George.

== Harold Martin ==
Harold Martin
- EastEnders character
- Portrayed by: David Sterne
- Appears in: Episode 6839; 15 January 2024
- Introduced by: Chris Clenshaw
In-universe information
- Wife: Aunt Sal (until 2024)
- Sons: Lenny Martin
- Daughters: Loretta Martin

Harold Martin, played by David Sterne, first appears in episode 6839, originally broadcast on 15 January 2024. The character and Sterne's casting details were announced on 8 January 2024. Harold is introduced as the husband of established character Aunt Sal (Anna Karen), the aunt of Phil Mitchell (Steve McFadden), Grant Mitchell (Ross Kemp) and Sam Mitchell (Kim Medcalf). Aunt Sal appeared on the show sporadically across 21 years with Harold being referenced throughout her appearances but never appearing. Sterne was contracted for a short guest stint. Chris Clenshaw, the show's executive producer, expressed his joy at casting Sterne and described the character as "elusive".

Producers introduced Harold to the show as part of a set of episodes portraying Aunt Sal's funeral. The character of Aunt Sal was killed-off, off-screen, following the real life death of Karen in February 2022. Clenshaw opined that it was "imperative that we gave Aunt Sal the send-off she deserved". Sterne enjoyed playing the character of Harold and recognised that the character was "important in the context of the show". He added, "The writing was brilliant, so he was a joy to play."

== Logan ==
Logan
- EastEnders character
- Portrayed by: Liam Hatch
- Appears in: Episode 6847; 29 January 2024
- Introduced by: Chris Clenshaw
In-universe information
- Occupation: Student

Logan, played by Liam Hatch, appears in episode 6847, originally broadcast on 29 January 2024. The character was announced on 24 January 2024. Logan is introduced as a school bully who has a fight with Denzel Danes (Jaden Ladega). Hatch used his own personal experiences of school to prepare for the role of Logan, but recognised that society had changed since he was at school. In light of this, the actor aimed to "modernise [himself] in a way" through his mannerisms and body language. Hatch's casting received criticism from viewers of the show as he is 10 years older than his character. The actor found the comments amusing and admitted that his friends had contacted him to check how he was feeling. Nadia Khomami, writing for The Guardian, opined that Logan had become "the most talked about bully of the week". Dan Seddon from Digital Spy described the character as someone "making Denzel Danes' life a misery on screen".

Logan first appears when he cuts the queue at McKlunky's fast food restaurant and insults Amy Mitchell (Ellie Dadd), who leaves, upset. Amy's boyfriend, Denzel Danes, sees Logan and confronts him in the market. Denzel receives support from the market traders, so Logan leaves. That night, Logan and his friends corner Denzel in a back alley and attack him, filming the attack. Yolande Trueman (Angela Wynter) finds the gang attacking Denzel and runs to intervene, but falls over; they begin filming her and laughing. Avani Nandra-Hart (Aaliyah James) sees the attack and threatens them with a metal pipe, so they all run away.

== Britney Wainwright ==
Britney Wainwright
- EastEnders character
- Portrayed by: Lola Campbell
- First appearance: Episode 6867; 4 March 2024
- Last appearance: Episode 6913; 23 May 2024
- Introduced by: Chris Clenshaw
In-universe information
- Mother: Keeley Wainwright
- Half-brothers: Taylor Wainwright

Britney Wainwright, played by Lola Campbell, first appears in episode 6867, originally broadcast on 4 March 2024. The character and Campbell's casting details were announced on 26 February 2024. Britney is introduced as a neglected child who bonds with established character Whitney Dean (Shona McGarty). McGarty likened Britney to a younger version of Whitney, which she said Whitney recognises. Britney is introduced during two special episodes of the show. The episodes were set across five weeks in Milton Keynes and feature the return of Bianca Jackson (Patsy Palmer). Filming took place from January 2024 with some on-location filming captured in paparazzi photography.

Writers devised the character of Britney as part of McGarty's exit from the series. Chris Clenshaw, the show's executive producer, was excited for Campbell to join the cast and teased that Whitney would be "thrust into the heart of the drama" with Britney's arrival. The character's backstory states that she and her brother, Taylor Wainwright (Mason Godfrey), are being neglected by their mother, Keeley Wainwright (Kirsty J Curtis), who is battling with addiction. Britney and Taylor live on the same estate as Bianca and are being supported by her. McGarty observed that Whitney feels "incredibly sorry" for Britney when they meet and resolves to "take her under her wing". Britney has not been attending school at all since the COVID-19 pandemic, which annoys Whitney. Keeley is later arrested, leaving Britney alone. Whitney then decides that she and her partner Zack Hudson (James Farrar) will foster her. McGarty told Sarah Ellis of Inside Soap that Whitney begins to make Britney "her main priority" instead of Zack and her unborn baby, which she opined was "quite sad".

== Keeley Wainwright ==
Keeley Wainwright
- EastEnders character
- Portrayed by: Kirsty J Curtis
- First appearance: Episode 6867; 4 March 2024
- Last appearance: Episode 6902; 2 May 2024
- Introduced by: Chris Clenshaw
In-universe information
- Sons: Taylor Wainwright
- Daughters: Britney Wainwright

Keeley Wainwright, played by Kirsty J Curtis, first appears in episode 6867, originally broadcast on 4 March 2024. The character and Curtis' casting details were announced on 26 February 2024. Keeley is introduced as the mother of Britney Wainwright (Lola Campbell) and Taylor Wainwright (Mason Godfrey). She is characterised as a neglectful mother who is battling addiction. The character initially appears in two special episodes of the show, which were set across five weeks in Milton Keynes and include the return of Bianca Jackson (Patsy Palmer). Filming took place from January 2024 with some on-location filming captured in paparazzi photography.

Keeley is neglectful towards her children and leaves them locked outside in the rain. Whitney Dean (Shona McGarty) confronts her about this and offers to help, but she rejects her support. Keeley later finds Britney and Whitney talking and takes Britney away; Britney explains that she is running an errand for her mother. When Whitney finds drugs on Britney, she confronts Keeley and is followed by her partner, Zack Hudson (James Farrar), and mother, Bianca Jackson. Keeley insults Bianca and taunts her about her recent breakup with Terry Spraggan (Terry Alderton), claiming that she had sex with Terry. In retaliation, Bianca throws a brick through Keeley's window as Britney arrives. Keeley blames Britney and drags her by her hair until Whitney stops it. The following day, Keeley is arrested for drug possession. After she is released, Whitney visits her and barges into her house. She berates Keeley for the state of the house and her upbringing of Britney, so Keeley tells Whitney to take her.

Keeley returns in episode 6895, which originally aired on 22 April 2024, after Britney is hospitalized after falling off her bike. She tells Whitney and Zack that Britney was diagnosed with Usher syndrome when she was younger and that the accident is likely because of that. Zack is mad that she didn't tell them, but Whitney understands that it would be difficult to tell Britney that she would lose her sight and hearing in the future. Keeley explains that she could never take care of a child who is blind and deaf and leaves before she has the chance to see Britney again. Keeley gives Whitney Britney's birth certificate before Whitney reminds Keeley that Usher syndrome is genetic and Keeley's drugs are not the cause of it. Keeley then tells Whitney that Zack clearly doesn't want Britney and Whitney should stop telling him that fostering Britney is temporary. Whitney says that Zack is a good guy and wouldn't give up a disabled child. Keeley departs in episode 6902, originally airing on 2 May 2024, when she heads back to Milton Keynes.

== Warren Finn ==
Warren Finn
- EastEnders character
- Portrayed by: Neil Roberts
- First appearance: Episode 6889; 10 April 2024
- Last appearance: Episode 6972; 3 September 2024
- Introduced by: Chris Clenshaw
In-universe information
- Occupation: Barrister

Warren Finn, played by Neil Roberts, first appears in episode 6889, originally broadcast on 10 April 2024. The character and Roberts' casting details were announced on 4 April 2024. Warren is introduced as the barrister hired to represent Eddie Knight (Christopher Fairbank) at his trial for historic racially motivated murder. Warren was described as a "straight-talking barrister" by Angie Quinn from MyLondon. Roberts was contracted for a guest stint. The actor expressed his excitement at guest starring in the soap. He was pleased to be part of the story and wanted to ensure it was portrayed "accurately and sensitively". The character appears in two episodes and departs in episode 6890, originally broadcast on 11 April 2024. Roberts reprised the role for two further episodes, first broadcast in September 2024.

At Eddie's trial, Warren questions his adopted son George Knight (Colin Salmon) about his witness statement, his upbringing and the character statement he was prepared to share at the pre-trial. Warren suggests that George is doing this in spite after learning that he was subject to baby farming as an infant. Eddie and Charles Dunlane (Jack Chissick) are then found guilty. Warren returns to defend Dean Wicks (Matt Di Angelo) at his trial for the murder of Keanu Taylor (Danny Walters), where he discredits Sharon Watts's (Letitia Dean) but fails to discredit Linda Carter (Kellie Bright); Finn ultimately abandons the case when Dean ignores his prior advice and confesses to raping Linda ten years previously.

== Levi ==
Levi
- EastEnders character
- Portrayed by: Mark Akintimehin
- First appearance: Episode 6893/6894; 17 April 2024
- Last appearance: Episode 6987; 30 September 2024
- Introduced by: Chris Clenshaw
In-universe information
- Occupation: Church elder

Levi, played by Mark Akintimehin, first appears in episode 6893/6894, originally broadcast on 17 April 2024. The character is introduced as a member of a church attended by established character Yolande Trueman (Angela Wynter). Writers used the character as part of a story exploring sexual assault when Yolande is assaulted by Pastor Clayton (Howard Saddler). Akintimehin made multiple appearances throughout the story as his character supports Yolande; he makes his last appearance in episode 6987, originally broadcast on 30 September 2024. Akintimehin found his experience on the soap to be "educational" and fast paced. He appreciated how patient the cast and crew were with him as he adapted to the environment.

A pastor in training, Levi attends the local church's community fundraiser, where he attracts the attention of Chelsea Fox (Zaraah Abrahams). He attends the next prayer group, where he encourages Yolande Trueman (Angela Wynter) to stand up for recognition of her work. Levi expresses concern for Yolande to Chelsea and Denise Fox (Diane Parish) after she misses some prayer group sessions. Chelsea meets Levi to discuss a baptism for her son, Jordan Atkins, but a panicked Yolande interrupts to warn Chelsea away, believing she is with Pastor Clayton (Howard Saddler). Levi and Chelsea calm Yolande down and he offers to call Pastor Clayton, which she declines. Levi helps with the opening of the church's community food truck and joins Chelsea for Sonia Fowler's (Natalie Cassidy) birthday drinks.

The next day, Yolande invites Levi to her home and informs him that Pastor Clayton sexually assaulted her. He assures her that the church will support her with the matter, and encourages her to report the assault to the police. Levi explains to Yolande's husband, Patrick Trueman (Rudolph Walker), that he needs to perform due diligence surrounding the report. He reassures Patrick that he is taking the allegation seriously, but Patrick does not agree and leaves. Levi then visits Yolande to tell her about Patrick's concerns. Yolande informs Levi that she and Patrick are going on a short holiday and asks if it will impact the investigation, but he assures her it will not. After Pastor Clayton is cleared by the police, Levi visits Yolande and Patrick to inform them that he has found another woman who have been assaulted by Pastor Clayton: Delia Bennett (Llewella Gideon). He explains that she reported him to the police but was not believed, and suggests that they meet. Yolande agrees to meet Delia, but worries about the impact of the meeting, so Levi reassures her that it has the opportunity to change things. Levi visits Yolande to inform her that following Delia's report, the Crown Prosecution Service (CPS) have decided to charge Pastor Clayton with two counts of sexual assault, and he has been suspended from the church.

== Junior Knight ==
Junior Knight, played by Micah Balfour, first appears in episode 6906, originally broadcast on 13 May 2024. The character had been referenced before his introduction, but further details about the character and Balfour's casting details were announced on 2 May 2024. Junior is introduced as the estranged son of George Knight (Colin Salmon). Balfour described Junior as "a complex man". The character's backstory states that Junior and George have been estranged for decades; however, the reasons were not disclosed prior to his arrival. This was then explored in the character's early episodes.

== Monique Knight ==
Monique Knight, played by Busayo Ige, first appears in episode 6907, originally broadcast on 14 May 2024. The character and Ige's casting details were announced on the same day as her first appearance. Monique is introduced as the wife of Junior Knight (Micah Balfour) and arrives with their young son, Xavier Knight (Chase Dean-Williams). Monique is of Ghanaian heritage, which helps her bond with Junior's father, George Knight (Colin Salmon). Producers wanted the characters of Monique and Xavier to be a surprise to the audience, especially as Junior has had sex with Bianca Jackson (Patsy Palmer) after his introduction. This twist led to Monique and Xavier's departures from the series after she learns the truth. The character departs in episode 6922, originally broadcast on 6 June 2024.

== Xavier Knight ==
Xavier Knight, played by Chase Dean-Williams, first appears in episode 6907, originally broadcast on 14 May 2024. The character and Dean-Williams' casting details were announced on the same day as his first appearance. Xavier is introduced as the young son of Junior Knight (Micah Balfour) and arrives with his mother, Monique Knight (Busayo Ige). Producers wanted the characters of Monique and Xavier to be a surprise to the audience, especially as Junior has had sex with Bianca Jackson (Patsy Palmer) after his introduction. This twist leads to Monique and Xavier's departures from the series after she learns the truth. The character departs in episode 6922, originally broadcast on 6 June 2024.

== Maya Houssain ==
Maya Houssain
- EastEnders character
- Portrayed by: Bharti Patel
- First appearance: Episode 6916; 29 May 2024
- Last appearance: Episode 6964; 21 August 2024
- Introduced by: Chris Clenshaw
In-universe information
- Husband: Abdul Houssain

Maya Houssain, played by Bharti Patel, first appears in episode 6916, originally broadcast on 29 May 2024. The character and Patel's casting details were announced on 20 May 2024. Maya is introduced as a new friend for Harvey Monroe (Ross Boatman) as part of his story exploring loneliness. Lily Shield-Polyzoides from Inside Soap suggested that the new friendship may not be "as innocent as it seems". Patel was contracted for a guest stint, and departed in episode 6964, originally broadcast on 21 August 2024.

Maya and Harvey's friendship develops over time and they become closer, which causes concern in his relationship with Jean Slater (Gillian Wright). Writers slowly revealed information about Maya's backstory, including that her husband has died recently. Viewers began speculating about the character's backstory and suggested that she has a connection to Aaron Monroe (Charlie Wernham), Harvey's son who was arrested for a far-right terrorist attack. In an unpublicised twist, it is revealed that Maya's backstory links into a 2021 story involving Harvey and Aaron. In the story, Aaron assaulted a taxi driver – revealed to be Maya's husband – in a racially motivated attack, and Harvey provided him with an alibi. Sanjiv Hayre was introduced as Maya's husband, Abdul Houssain, who requires full-time care after the attack. Harvey agrees to support Maya and Abdul financially as "penance" for his role in helping Aaron. Writers used this to create problems for Harvey and Jean's relationship.

== Teddy Mitchell ==
Teddy Mitchell, played by Roland Manookian, first appears in episode 6931, originally broadcast on 26 June 2024. The character and Manookian's casting details were announced on 6 June 2024. Teddy is created alongside his sons, Harry Mitchell (Elijah Holloway) and Barney Mitchell (Lewis Bridgeman), as an extension of the well-established Mitchell family. The character is introduced as the son of Stevie Mitchell (Alan Ford) and half-brother of Billy Mitchell (Perry Fenwick), who did not know about Teddy's existence.

== Harry Mitchell ==
Harry Mitchell
- EastEnders character
- Portrayed by: Elijah Holloway
- Duration: 2024–present
- First appearance: Episode 6931; 26 June 2024
- Introduced by: Chris Clenshaw
In-universe information
- Occupation: Mechanic
- Family: Mitchell
- Father: Teddy Mitchell
- Mother: Nicola Mitchell
- Half-brothers: Barney Mitchell
- Half-sisters: Ivy Knight-Mitchell
- Sons: Ethan Branning-Panesar
- Grandfathers: Stevie Mitchell; Cliff Hawkins
- Grandmothers: Rose Hawkins
- Uncles: Billy Mitchell
- Aunts: Gemma Hawkins; Jodie Hawkins
- First cousins: Jamie Mitchell; Ryder Hawkins; Janet Mitchell; Will Mitchell
- Other relatives: Phil Mitchell; Grant Mitchell; Sam Mitchell

Harry Mitchell, played by Elijah Holloway, first appears in episode 6931, originally broadcast on 26 June 2024. The character and Holloway's casting details were announced on 6 June 2024. Harry is created alongside his father, Teddy Mitchell (Roland Manookian), and brother, Barney Mitchell (Lewis Bridgeman), as an extension of the well-established Mitchell family. The character is introduced as the nephew of established character Billy Mitchell (Perry Fenwick), who did not know about the extended family's existence. Chris Clenshaw, the show's executive producer, was excited for the arrival of the extended Mitchell family and teased that they would develop a rivalry with Phil Mitchell (Steve McFadden).

Holloway characterised Harry as a charming and temperamental person who cannot "resist trouble, or the ladies". He thought that Harry would "shake things up in typical Mitchell style". Holloway felt privileged to join the soap and was excited to portray a member of the Mitchell family. Producers romantically paired Harry with established character Penny Branning (Kitty Castledine) in his early scenes. Chloe Timms from Inside Soap reported that "chemistry sizzles" between the pair upon Harry's arrival.

== Barney Mitchell ==
Barney Mitchell
- EastEnders character
- Portrayed by: Lewis Bridgeman
- Duration: 2024–present
- First appearance: Episode 6931; 26 June 2024
- Introduced by: Chris Clenshaw
In-universe information
- Occupation: Student
- Family: Mitchell
- Father: Zack Hudson
- Mother: Nicola Mitchell
- Adoptive father: Teddy Mitchell
- Half-brothers: Harry Mitchell
- Half-sisters: Dolly Dean-Hudson; Ivy Knight-Mitchell
- Grandfathers: Cliff Hawkins
- Grandmothers: Rose Hawkins
- Aunts: Sharon Watts; Gemma Hawkins; Jodie Hawkins
- Nephews: Ethan Branning-Panesar
- First cousins: Ryder Hawkins; Albie Watts

Barney Mitchell, played by Lewis Bridgeman, first appears in episode 6931, originally broadcast on 26 June 2024. The character and Bridgeman's casting details were announced on 6 June 2024. Barney is created alongside his father, Teddy Mitchell (Roland Manookian), and brother, Harry Mitchell (Elijah Holloway), as an extension of the established Mitchell family. The character is introduced as the nephew of established character Billy Mitchell (Perry Fenwick), who did not know about the extended family's existence. Chris Clenshaw, the show's executive producer, was excited for the arrival of the extended Mitchell family and teased that they would develop a rivalry with Phil Mitchell (Steve McFadden).

Bridgeman described Barney as "introverted", which contrasts the rest of his family. He thought that Barney was "an interesting character to explore". Bridgeman was excited to be cast in the show and looked forward to watching the character develop. Producers created a friendship between Barney and established character Avani Nandra-Hart (Aaliyah James) in his early scenes. In March 2025, it is revealed by Barney's mother, Nicola Mitchell (Laura Doddington), that Barney's biological father is Zack Hudson (James Farrar) and not Teddy, following a one-night stand while Zack was working as Nicola's personal trainer.

== Brenda Collins ==
Brenda Collins, played by Nichola McAuliffe, first appeared in episode 6951, originally broadcast on 29 July 2024. The character and McAuliffe's casting details were announced on 25 July 2024. Brenda is introduced as the mother of Debbie Colwell (Jenny Meier), who is married to established character Reiss Colwell (Jonny Freeman). Brenda and her husband, Hugh Collins (Michael Bertenshaw), are introduced in the aftermath of Debbie's death; unbeknownst to anyone, she was murdered by Reiss. Justin Harp of Digital Spy reported that Brenda and Hugh would have "some uncomfortable questions" for Reiss. On 3 March 2025, it was announced that McAuliffe would return for Reiss's funeral. Ash Percival from Metro described Brenda to be "winning over fans with her barbed putdowns and hatred of Reiss".

== Hugh Collins ==
Hugh Collins, played by Michael Bertenshaw, first appeared in episode 6951, originally broadcast on 29 July 2024. The character and Bertenshaw's casting details were announced on 25 July 2024. Hugh is introduced as the father of Debbie Colwell (Jenny Meier), who is married to established character Reiss Colwell (Jonny Freeman). Hugh and his wife, Brenda Collins (Nichola McAuliffe), are introduced in the aftermath of Debbie's death; unbeknownst to anyone, she was murdered by Reiss. Justin Harp of Digital Spy reported that Brenda and Hugh would have "some uncomfortable questions" for Reiss. He made his final appearance in episode 6988, which originally aired on 1 October 2024.

== Ayesha Siddhu ==
Ayesha Siddhu
- EastEnders character
- Portrayed by: Laila Rouass
- First appearance: Episode 6955; 5 August 2024
- Last appearance: Episode 6958; 12 August 2024
- Introduced by: Chris Clenshaw
In-universe information
- Occupation: Businesswoman
- Husband: Hardeep Siddhu

Ayesha Siddhu, played by Laila Rouass, first appears in episode 6955, originally broadcast on 5 August 2024. The character and Rouass' casting details were announced on 26 July 2024. Ayesha is introduced as an old friend of Suki Panesar (Balvinder Sopal) and arrives after being invited to Albert Square, the show's setting, by Suki's former husband Nish Panesar (Navin Chowdhry). Rouass was excited to appear in the soap and work with Chowdhry and Sopal, having previously worked with the former. The actress was born and raised in the East End of London, so dubbed her role "a lifelong dream come true". In an interview with Laura Denby from the Radio Times, Rouass revealed that she had always wanted a role in EastEnders and felt that she could not turn the opportunity down. Rouass was contracted for a guest stint, and the character departs in episode 6958, originally broadcast on 12 August 2024.

The character's backstory states that Nish murdered Ayesha's husband, Hardeep, because he thought he was having an affair with Suki. However, it emerges that Suki actually had romantic feelings towards Ayesha, which she reciprocated but never acted upon. Rouass described their relationship as a "first love thing" and explained that Ayesha finds Suki's decision to come out "inspiring" and brave as she did not expect it to happen. When they meet, Nish apologises to Ayesha for murdering Hardeep, but Ayesha refuses to accept his apology. Rouass told Denby that Ayesha "probably has hate in her heart for Nish", so is not prepared to "tolerate" him now. Nish reunites Ayesha and Suki in hope that it creates problems for her relationship to Eve Unwin (Heather Peace). Rouass pointed out that Ayesha quickly recognises how Nish is trying to manipulate the situation, having witnessed emotional abuse from Nish towards Suki in the past.

== Beryl ==
Beryl
- EastEnders character
- Portrayed by: Ninette Finch
- Duration: 2024–present
- First appearance: Episode 6957; 7 August 2024
- Introduced by: Chris Clenshaw

Beryl, played by Ninette Finch, is an elderly lady who is frequently seen around Walford and visiting its establishments. She was first seen in August 2024 as a customer in Beale's Eels when Bobby Beale (Clay Milner Russell) has been left in charge. In February 2025, she attends an appointment at Fox & Hair where she has her nails done by Kim Fox (Tameka Empson). She is present when the salon suffers from a power cut. In July 2025, she buys a pair of boxing gloves from Billy Mitchell (Perry Fenwick)'s stall. In September 2025, she is seen sat next to Tommy Moon (Sonny Kendall) and Joel Marshall (Max Murray) whilst they are travelling on the tube, and in November 2025, she is seen in the café. In March 2026, Beryl attends another appointment at Fox & Hair, where she gives Denise Fox (Diane Parish) a tip to give to Josh Goodwin (Joshua Vaughan) following his first day working as a trainee.

== Kobina Asare ==
Kobina Asare
- EastEnders character
- Portrayed by: Jonathan Nyati
- First appearance: Episode 6967; 27 August 2024
- Last appearance: Episode 6969; 29 August 2024
- Introduced by: Chris Clenshaw
In-universe information
- Father: Henry Kofi Asare
- Mother: Margaret Abena Asare
- Brothers: George Knight; Kojo Asare
- Nephews: Junior Knight
- Nieces: Gina Knight; Anna Knight; Ivy Knight-Mitchell

Kobina Asare, played by Jonathan Nyati, first appears in episode 6967, originally broadcast on 27 August 2024. The character and Nyati's casting details were announced on 14 August 2024. Kobina is introduced alongside his brother, Kojo Asare (Dayo Koleosho), as the long-lost brothers of established character George Knight (Colin Salmon). Producers devised the characters as part of the continued exploration of George's family and backstory after he discovers he is of Ghanaian heritage. Kobina and Kojo arrive during a visit to the UK from Ghana and are introduced to George by their mother's friend, Angela Lawal (Susan Auderin), who had been previously introduced to the show. Kobina is a carer for Kojo, who is autistic.

The characters' shared backstory states that their father was killed by George's adoptive father. Kobina and Kojo were unaware of this until George reveals the truth, which causes tension between them. An Inside Soap columnist observed that the revelation "sours the atmosphere somewhat". Chris Clenshaw, the show's executive producer, explained that this would create "a lot of complex emotions" for the brothers. Nyati expressed his delight at appearing in EastEnders and being part of George's story. Nyati was contracted for a guest stint, and departs in episode 6969, originally broadcast on 29 August 2024.

== Kojo Asare ==
Kojo Asare
- EastEnders character
- Portrayed by: Dayo Koleosho
- Duration: 2024–present
- First appearance: Episode 6967; 27 August 2024
- Introduced by: Chris Clenshaw
In-universe information
- Occupation: Mechanic
- Father: Henry Kofi Asare
- Mother: Margaret Abena Asare
- Brothers: George Knight; Kobina Asare
- Nephews: Junior Knight
- Nieces: Gina Knight; Anna Knight; Ivy Knight-Mitchell

Kojo Asare, played by Dayo Koleosho, first appears in episode 6967, originally broadcast on 27 August 2024. The character and Koleosho's casting details were announced on 14 August 2024. Kojo is introduced alongside his brother, Kobina Asare (Jonathan Nyati), as the long-lost brothers of established character George Knight (Colin Salmon). Producers devised the characters as part of the continued exploration of George's family and backstory after he discovers he is of Ghanaian heritage. Kojo and Kobina arrive during a visit to the UK from Ghana and are introduced to George by their mother's friend, Angela Lawal (Susan Auderin), who had been previously introduced to the show. Kojo is autistic and Koleosho is a neurodivergent actor. Kobina is Kojo's carer, a role which George takes on after Kobina explains how he is becoming overwhelmed with the responsibility. To support Koleosho on-set, a calmer environment was established. Salmon enjoyed working with Koleosho and felt proud that the show was portraying autism.

The characters' shared backstory states that their father was killed by George's adoptive father. Kojo and Kobina were unaware of this until George reveals the truth, which causes tension between them. An Inside Soap columnist observed that the revelation "sours the atmosphere somewhat". Chris Clenshaw, the show's executive producer, explained that this would create "a lot of complex emotions" for the brothers. Koleosho was contracted to the main cast. He expressed his delight at joining the cast and working with his co-stars. He commented, "It is a dream that has become reality."

== Jackie Fairhurst ==
Jackie Fairhurst, portrayed by Joanna Bending, is a social worker who visits Kat Mitchell (Jessie Wallace) regarding her son, Tommy Moon's (Sonny Kendall) violent behavior after being called by Jean Slater (Gillian Wright). She first appeared in Episode 7002, which originally aired on 24 October 2024. Jackie arrives to assess the situation by talking to Alfie Moon (Shane Richie), the twins Bert and Ernie Moon (Elliot and Cody Briffett) and Tommy. As a result, they realised that Tommy did pose a threat to the twins, so he ended up staying with Zack Hudson (James Farrar). Upon casting, Bending was thrilled to be cast in EastEnders. Taking to Instagram, she posted with the caption: "A new Social and a Handsome DC arrive in Albert Square tonight at 7.30pm......." This was Bending's second role in EastEnders after playing Doctor Alex Burham between 2013 and 2017.

== Nicola Mitchell ==
Nicola Mitchell, played by Laura Doddington, first appears in episode 7011, originally broadcast on 11 November 2024. The character had been referenced before her introduction, but further details about the character and Doddington's casting details were announced on 2 October 2024. Nicola is introduced as the former wife of Teddy Mitchell (Roland Manookian) and mother of Harry Mitchell (Elijah Holloway) and Barney Mitchell (Lewis Bridgeman). Doddington previously guest starred in EastEnders in an episode first broadcast in 2009. Doddington was excited to join the cast and enjoyed working with her on-screen family. Chris Clenshaw, the show's executive producer, expressed his joy surrounding Nicola's introduction and looked forward to exploring her relationships with her family.

== Drew Peacock ==
Drew Peacock
- EastEnders character
- Portrayed by: Paul Clayton
- Duration: 2024–2025
- First appearance: Episode 7015; 18 November 2024
- Last appearance: Episode 7134; 11 June 2025
- Introduced by: Chris Clenshaw
In-universe information
- Occupation: Drag Queen

Drew Peacock, portrayed by Paul Clayton, is a drag queen who was hired for Elaine Peacock's (Harriet Thorpe) hen do; however, it later transpired that Elaine and Drew knew each other and that he had an affair with her late husband, John Peacock when their daughter, Linda Carter (Kellie Bright) was young. He first appeared on 18 November 2024. Clayton's casting was announced earlier that day with Lewis Knight from Radio Times describing him to be a "blast from the past". Knight also reported: "Fans will have seen Elaine's grandson Johnny Carter (Charlie Suff) organising entertainment for the event in Thursday's episode and revealed to Elaine's future stepdaughter Anna Knight (Molly Rainford) that he booked 'Drew Peacock' for the event - noting the matching surname."

On 20 November 2024, Drew and Elaine shared some "emotional" scenes after discussing the past and Drew revealing he was diagnosed with HIV in 1986. On 6 June 2025, it was announced that Drew would be returning and he reappeared on 11 June 2025. After his returned aired, he was popular with fans and many wished he could become a permanent character.

== Roman Allen ==
Roman Allen
- EastEnders character
- Portrayed by: Leo
- Duration: 2024–2025
- First appearance: Episode 7017; 19 November 2024
- Last appearance: Episode 7100; 10 April 2025
- Introduced by: Chris Clenshaw
In-universe information
- Family: Fowler
- Father: Martin Fowler
- Mother: Ruby Allen
- Half-sisters: Bex Fowler; Hope Fowler

Roman Allen is the infant son of Ruby Allen (Louisa Lytton) and Martin Fowler (James Bye). He first appeared in episode 7017, which originally aired 19 November 2024. Martin is initially unaware of his existence until being informed by Sharon Watts (Letitia Dean). After Ruby claims to have had Roman adopted at birth, Martin follows her to a hospital, where Roman is being treated for autoimmune hepatitis and a paracetamol overdose. Roman was born off-screen in June 2022, whilst Ruby was in prison. On 25 November 2024, Leo's casting agency, Bonnie and Betty posted about his casting on Instagram: "We can finally reveal that our lovely little Leo plays new character Roman Allen in BBC's Eastenders. Roman appeared on screen for the first time last week and was revealed to be the child of Ruby Allen and Martin Fowler."

Helen Daly from Radio Times described Roman's arrival to be a "bombshell" for Martin. She continued: "The loveable market trader recently discovered that he had a baby with Ruby, and was surprised to say the least." As a result, Martin vows to gain custody of Roman. On 7 April 2025, after Martin's funeral, Ruby decides to have Roman's name changed from Allen to Fowler in memory of his father.

== Other characters ==
Character	Episode date(s)	Actor	Circumstances
Juliette Dubois	1 January	Lily Catalifo	A former colleague of Penny Branning (Kitty Castledine) who she has been avoiding. They discuss an event where Penny was nearly arrested. Penny and her cousin, Lauren Branning (Jacqueline Jossa), later find Juliette talking to Lauren's son, Louie Beale (Jake McNally). She explains that Louie told her about Penny's father, Jack Branning (Scott Maslen), a detective in the police force; Penny reassures Juliette that she is estranged from her father. Juliette threatens Louie's life and instructs Penny to do a job for her, claiming that Penny's disability will help.
Maxime	1 January	Ilan Evans	A man who flirts with Lauren Branning (Jacqueline Jossa) at a New Year's Eve party. She rebuffs his advances and asks him for her name, which he cannot recall. He leaves her alone when Lauren's cousin, Penny Branning (Kitty Castledine), tells him that Lauren is a recovering alcoholic and single mother.
Elle	1 January	Zoë Armer	A woman who Peter Beale (Thomas Law) meets in Peggy's nightclub. They return to Peter's house and have sex. Afterwards, she reveals that she has a fiancé.
Officer Pickard	1 January	Saif Al-Warith	A police officer who asks to search Lauren Branning's (Jacqueline Jossa) suitcase at the airport after a detection dog alerts them to it. He finds a packet of drugs inside and arrests Lauren.
DI Price	3–4 January (2 episodes)	Simon Lenagan	A detective inspector who interviews Penny Branning (Kitty Castledine) when she confesses to the drug smuggling offence that her cousin, Lauren Branning (Jacqueline Jossa), has been arrested for. DI Price speaks to Penny's father, detective Jack Branning (Scott Maslen), and sympathises with him. He asks his colleague, DC Barkley, to escort Penny to her cell, but when he enters the room, Penny is out of her wheelchair and on the floor, claiming DC Barkley has hit her. In an interview with DI Price and DC Barkley, Penny threatens to press charges unless the charges against her and Lauren are dropped; she stops when DI Price reveals two hidden CCTV cameras caught her tipping herself of her wheelchair. DI Price then offers Penny a deal to have her and Lauren released in exchange for information about Juliette Dubois (Lily Catalifo). After consulting with Jack, Penny agrees to provide DI Price with information about Juliette.
DC Barkley	4 January	Uncredited	A detective constable working with DI Price (Simon Lenagan) to investigate Penny Branning (Kitty Castledine) for drug smuggling. Whilst alone in an interview room, Penny tips herself out of her wheelchair onto the floor; when DC Barkley enters the room, she cries out for him not to hit her again. She then claims that DC Barkley hit her and demands that he is removed from her case. She threatens to press charges against him unless the charges against her and Lauren are dropped, but stops when DI Price reveals two hidden CCTV cameras caught her tipping herself of her wheelchair.
Builder Dave	8–11 January (2 episodes)	Dan Skinner	A builder preparing to start work on Kathy's café, having been hired by Vinny Panesar (Shiv Jalota) while the owner, his father Nish Panesar (Navin Chowdhry), is in a coma. Kathy Cotton (Gillian Taylforth) and Suki Panesar (Balvinder Sopal) send Dave and his colleagues to get a sandwich to keep them away from café, where the body of Keanu Taylor (Danny Walters) has been hidden by Kathy, Suki, Sharon Watts (Letitia Dean), Stacey Slater (Lacey Turner), Denise Fox (Diane Parish) and Linda Carter (Kellie Bright). Suki speaks to Dave and explains that she wants the work postponing until after Nish is out of his coma, but Dave only agrees to postpone the work for a couple of days. He adds that they will still need paying for the inconvenience. When Dave and his team return to the café, they find that the hole in the floor has been concreted over. They exit the café to find Denise staring at them; they mock her until her daughter, Chelsea Fox (Zaraah Abrahams), interjects. Dave later explains to Nish and Suki that the café floor may need digging up.
Loretta Martin	15 January	Nicola Wright	The children of Aunt Sal (Anna Karen) and Harold Martin (David Sterne) who attend Sal's funeral. Loretta mistakes Jay Brown (Jamie Borthwick) for the husband of Ben Mitchell (Max Bowden), who is Sal's great-nephew. Loretta and Lenny chat with their cousin Phil Mitchell (Steve McFadden) and meet his wife, Kat Mitchell (Jessie Wallace), and stepson, Tommy Moon (Sonny Kendall).
Lenny Martin	15 January	Philip Day	The children of Aunt Sal (Anna Karen) and Harold Martin (David Sterne) who attend Sal's funeral. Loretta mistakes Jay Brown (Jamie Borthwick) for the husband of Ben Mitchell (Max Bowden), who is Sal's great-nephew. Loretta and Lenny chat with their cousin Phil Mitchell (Steve McFadden) and meet his wife, Kat Mitchell (Jessie Wallace), and stepson, Tommy Moon (Sonny Kendall).
Sadie	17 January	Emma Carter	A marriage counsellor who leads a counselling session between Denise Fox (Diane Parish) and Jack Branning (Scott Maslen). She asks Denise how she feels after Jack admits to feeling guilty about his affair.
Rory	23 January	Me'sha Bryan	A friend of Howie Danes (Delroy Atkinson) who previously worked with him in the entertainment industry; she now works on a cruise ship. Howie introduces Rory to his partner, Kim Fox-Hubbard (Tameka Empson), who is uncomfortable with Rory's presence. At a group photoshoot, Rory informs the team of entertainers that budget cuts mean people may not be offered a contract, which Kim claims is unfair. Rory later visits Howie and Kim at home to offer Kim a job as the cruise ship's social media manager.
Barminder	24 January	Amina Zia	A friend of the Panesar family who attends the same gurdwara as them. She chats with Suki Panesar (Balvinder Sopal) and asks why she has not visited the gurdwara recently; Suki claims to have been busy with work. They have a catch up, where Suki reveals that she has ended her marriage to Nish Panesar (Navin Chowdhry) and is worried about being judged by others. Barminder encourages Suki to return to the gurdwara and reassures her that she will be supported.
Shahir	29 January	Johndeep More	A man who Alfie Moon (Shane Richie) meets at radiotherapy. Shahir explains that it is his first radiotherapy appointment, so Alfie answers some of his questions and reassures him about the experience. After his radiotherapy, Shahir is collected by his friend and their children.
District Judge Crane	30 January	Dionne Neish	The judge presiding over the special guardianship order hearing for Charli Slater.
Rufus	31 January	James Arden	A boxer at The Boxing Den gym. Denzel Danes (Jaden Ledega) asks him to spar with him, but George Knight (Colin Salmon) believes it is a bad idea as Rufus is three weight classes heavier than Denzel. Rufus agrees to be gentle, so they spar, but Rufus wins.
Madame Tellerina	1 February	Sarah Crowden	A psychic who is hired to perform at The Queen Victoria pub by the landlady, Elaine Peacock (Harriet Thorpe). She performs a reading on Reiss Colwell (Jonny Freeman) and accepts multiple free drinks from Elaine. Denise Fox (Diane Parish), who is struggling after being involved in a murder cover-up, offers to have a public reading. Madame Tellerina claims to be speaking to a man buried underground who "didn't deserve this", panicking Denise, but she then barks and reveals to be referring to a dog. Denise angrily calls out Madame Tellerina for lying, so they move on.
Gains Guv'nor	1 February − 1 April (6 episodes)	Sanchez Brown	A fitness social media influencer whose videos are watched by Denzel Danes (Jaden Ledega). Denzel sees a video promoting Gains Guv'nor's new fitness programme, which is on sale at half price. He later looks at pictures of Gains Guv'nor before deciding to purchase steroids. Denzel continues to watch his videos.
Charles Dunlane	12 February − 11 April (4 episodes)	Jack Chissick	A friend of Eddie Knight (Christopher Fairbank) who attends a party celebrating Eddie's community award at his home with friend Gerald (Geoff McGivern). Prior to the party, they are warned by Eddie's wife, Gloria Knight (Elizabeth Counsell), not to upset their family. At the party, Charles makes crude comments towards Elaine Peacock (Harriet Thorpe), who is engaged to Eddie and Gloria's son George Knight (Colin Salmon); Eddie reprimands him. Charles and Eddie are placed on trial for the historic racially motivated murder of George's biological father, Henry Kofi Asare. As they wait outside the courtroom for the pre-trial, Charles makes racist remarks. Charles and Eddie stand trial a month later; George gives a statement attesting to seeing both men attack Henry. They are found guilty.
Gerald	12 February	Geoff McGivern	A friend of Eddie Knight (Christopher Fairbank) who attends a party celebrating Eddie's community award at his home with friend Charles Dunlane (Jack Chissick). Prior to the party, they are warned by Eddie's wife, Gloria Knight (Elizabeth Counsell), not to upset their family. Gerald gets drunk and accidentally reveals to Eddie and Gloria's son, George Knight (Colin Salmon), that Eddie is pending trial for a historic racially motivated murder and needs a character witness statement from him.
Sue	15 February	Julia Riley	A customer at Fox & Hair salon who is unhappy with how short Denise Fox (Diane Parish) has cut her hair. Denise is then rude towards Sue, so Amy Mitchell (Ellie Dadd) offers her the haircut for free.
Dr Okeke	22 February	Lisa Davina Phillip	Three doctors from the local mental health team who assess Denise Fox (Diane Parish) as a mental health risk after being called. They have concerns about Denise and inform her husband, Jack Branning (Scott Maslen), and daughter, Chelsea Fox (Zaraah Abrahams), that she is displaying signs of psychosis and needs to be sectioned. Dr Okeke explains that if Denise refuses to be sectioned voluntarily, they will need to call the police. Denise agrees to be sectioned voluntarily and goes with the mental health team.
Sally Lunt	22 February	Rachel Denning	
Dr Giles	22 February	Uncredited	
Roger Peel	26–29 February (2 episodes)	Ben Jones	A divorce lawyer introduced to Kat Mitchell (Jessie Wallace) by her boyfriend, Nish Panesar (Navin Chowdhry). He suggests to Kat that they move her assets into a limited company registered in someone else's name. He flirts with Kat and reveals he is married. Kat asks Eve Unwin (Heather Peace) about Roger and she explains that he is a notorious adulterer and should not be trusted. Kat meets with Roger privately at her office the following day and they flirt. Roger kisses Kat, so she points out the CCTV camera. She threatens to send the footage if he does not give her information about Nish that she can use to her advantage, but Roger explains that his wife would not be bothered by a kiss. Suki Panesar (Balvinder Sopal) then enters and reveals that is incorrect as Roger is on his final warning with his wife. He agrees to provide information on Nish, which is overheard by Avani Nandra-Hart (Sophie Khan Levy), who informs Nish.
Fern	26–29 February (2 episodes)	Ellena Vincent	A customer at Beale's Eels pie and mash restaurant who flirts with owner Dean Wicks (Matt Di Angelo). Dean's daughter, Jade Masood (Elizabeth Green), later sees her and asks for her phone number on Dean's behalf. Fern and Dean exchange texts and arrange a date for the following day. When their date begins, it is awkward and Dean appears uncomfortable, so Fern suggests ending it, but he apologises and blames a previous break up. Dean tells Fern that his name is Dean Beale to avoid her finding information about him online. After the date, Dean tells Fern about Jade's recent transplant and invites her for a drink. They kiss but are interrupted by Amy Mitchell (Ellie Dadd), who warns Fern to search Dean Wicks online as he raped Linda Carter (Kellie Bright) and attempted to rape her mother, Roxy Mitchell (Rita Simons). Fern then leaves.
Maya	1 March	Raagni Sharma	A solicitor hired by Dean Wicks (Matt Di Angelo) to offer legal advice regarding his daughter, Jade Masood's (Elizabeth Green), move to Pakistan. As Jade has recently had an operation, Maya explains that she will need a review from a general practitioner (GP) and if she is stable, she will be able to fly.
Vince	4 March	Francis Tucker	The partner of Keeley Wainwright (Kirsty J Curtis) who listens to Whitney Dean's (Shona McGarty) concerns about the welfare of Keeley's daughter, Britney Wainwright (Lola Campbell). He calls Britney a "pretty little thing", which unnerves Whitney.
Ruth Bayford	4 March	Rebecca Clow	The headteacher of Britney Wainwright's (Lola Campbell) school who meets with Whitney Dean (Shona McGarty) to discuss Britney's absence from school. Ruth admits that she has never met Britney and that she should be in year eight, but has never enrolled. She explains that Britney was withdrawn from primary school during the COVID-19 pandemic when she was in year five to be home educated and would return for secondary education. Ruth describes Britney as a "ghost child" and tells Whitney how lots of children disappeared following the pandemic, but schools and social services do not have resources to find them.
Taylor Wainwright	4 March	Mason Godfrey	The half-brother of Britney Wainwright (Lola Campbell). They visit Bianca Jackson's (Patsy Palmer) home for food and are introduced to Bianca's adopted daughter, Whitney Dean (Shona McGarty), and her partner, Zack Hudson (James Farrar). Taylor and Britney's mother, Keeley Wainwright (Kirsty J Curtis), is neglectful towards them and Bianca finds them outside in the rain after they are locked out of their home. Taylor later goes to stay with his father.
Dr Marion Dixon	5 March	Sally George	A doctor who examines Whitney Dean (Shona McGarty), who is pregnant, after she is hit by a car. She performs an ultra scan and confirms her baby is well.
Adam	5 March	Cal-I Jonel	The social worker allocated to Britney Wainwright (Lola Campbell) who meets with her, Whitney Dean (Shona McGarty) and Zack Hudson (James Farrar) to discuss a plan for Britney following her mother, Keeley Wainwright's (Kirsty J Curtis), arrest. He explains that Keeley has requested that Britney stay with her partner Vince (Francis Tucker) at home, but Whitney warns that this is a bad idea. She offers that she and Zack keep Britney until Keeley's return, but Zack appears less convinced and leaves. Adam explains that they need to respect Keeley's wishes, but if there are issues, they could look at foster care; Whitney reveals that she and Zack are registered foster parents. Adam agrees to speak to Keeley and Vince and explore the option of Britney staying in Whitney's care.
Maddie	7 March	Talya Harris	A customer at Walford East restaurant who flirts with Zack Hudson (James Farrar).
Dr Abe	11–13 March (3 episodes)	El Anthony	A doctor at the mental health facility where Denise Fox (Diane Parish) is undergoing treatment. He checks in with Denise and reassures her about her experience of psychosis. He asks her to open up about any other traumas in her life, but she ignores him. The following day, he brings Denise to see Stacey Slater (Lacey Turner) in a visiting room. He then interrupts Denise's meeting with her husband, Jack Branning (Scott Maslen), and asks him to leave at her request. Dr Abe then chats with Denise and asks how she is feeling after seeing Stacey and Jack. He suggests that Jack could be a trigger for Denise, but she rejects this idea. Denise then asks to be left alone. Later that day, they have another conversation, where Denise opens up about how she is feeling; she explains that she feels safe in the unit and that she is worried she may hurt her friends if she is at home. Dr Abe suggests that they consider exploring options about returning home.
William	12 March	Peter Barrett	A solicitor representing Eddie Knight (Christopher Fairbank) and Charles Dunlane (Jack Chissick) at their trial for historic racially motivated murder. He informs Eddie that the trial has been delayed, which irritates Eddie. When court is ready to commence, Eddie tells William that he wants to wait until his son, George Knight (Colin Salmon), arrives to give a character witness statement. He arrives and in court, William invites George to read his statement; George provides a negative statement about Eddie, so William tries to stop it.
Angela Lawal	12 March − 26 November (5 episodes)	Susan Anderin	A woman who attends the pre-trial of Eddie Knight (Christopher Fairbank) and Charles Dunlane (Jack Chissick) for the historic racially motivated murder of Henry Kofi Asare. Eddie's wife, Gloria Knight (Elizabeth Counsell), sees Angela from afar and wonders if she is related to Henry. During the trial, Henry's son George Knight (Colin Salmon), who was adopted by Eddie and Gloria, provides a negative statement about Eddie; Angela rushes out of the courtroom during it. George theorises that Angela is his biological mother. Johnny Carter (Charlie Suff) gives George the woman's name and phone number; he calls her and leaves a message, so she arrives at his home, The Queen Victoria public house. George explains that he witnessed the attack and regrets not informing the police, before asking if she is his mother. Angela confirms that she is not his mother but her mother's friend. She tells him about his mother, Margaret Asare, and reveals that she died four months earlier after a long illness. She explains that they were nurses together and that he has two younger brothers, before offering to get in contact with them for him; he declines the offer. Angela tells George about Henry trying to collect him to bring him back to Ghana and how Eddie told Margaret that Henry had collected George and ran away, devastating her. Angela reassures George that Margaret would have loved him and been proud of his life. Before leaving, she reveals that George's birth name is Kwame. A month later, Angela is called to speak for the prosecution at Eddie and Charles' trial. Angela returned in August with George's brothers from Ghana, Kobina (Jonathan Nyati) and Kojo Asare (Dayo Koleosho); however, she had failed to tell them their mother, Margaret Asare, had died earlier in the year. She returns in November to attend George and Elaine Peacock's (Harriet Thorpe) wedding.
Agatha	13 March − 30 September (5 episodes)	Chloe Okora	A member of Yolande Trueman's (Angela Wynter) church group. She tells Yolande that there are rumours about her and Pastor Gideon Clayton (Howard Saddler), who is married, being in a secret relationship. At another session, Pastor Clayton invites Agatha to read a bible passage; she reads Hebrews 13:4, a passage about marriage and adultery. Yolande confronts her for making accusations about the Pastor, so Agatha refers to her as a "jezebel"; Yolande slaps her and leaves the group. Agatha attends the Easter prayer group and talks to other members about being worried to return to the group. Yolande apologises, but Agatha repeats that she believes her and Pastor Clayton are having an affair, so Yolande leaves. Yolande leads a prayer at the group and then seeks out Agatha to apologise again, which she accepts. Agatha attends the opening of the church's community food truck.
Dr Trent	18 March	Cai Brigden	A doctor who performs a check up on Jade Masood (Elizabeth Green). He explains that he had hoped the antibiotics would have treated her chest infection by this point.
Dr Nazir	21–25 March (2 episodes)	Aosaf Afzal	A doctor treating Jade Masood (Elizabeth Green) after her hospital admission. He speaks to Jade's father, Dean Wicks (Matt Di Angelo), and friend, Jean Slater (Gillian Wright) to explain he is concerned about her chest infection; Dr Nazir questions if she has been taking her antibiotics as prescribed. Jean offers to collect the antibiotics, which Dr Nazir agrees is a good idea; Dean is initially hesitant but relents. When he receives the antibiotics, Dr Nazir confirms they look correct. Dr Nazir recommends keeping Jade in hospital for a few days to monitor her recovery, but Dean decides that she should be discharged early.
Sandra	21 March	Zoë Clayton-Kelly	A community mental health worker who arrives at Denise Fox's (Diane Parish) home to check in following her release from a mental health facility. She meets Denise's husband, Jack Branning (Scott Maslen), who reveals that Denise no longer lives at the home.
Casey Quinnan	25 March	Emma Prendergast	A journalist from the Walford Gazette newspaper who asks to write a piece about Dean Wicks (Matt Di Angelo) and Jade Masood (Elizabeth Green) following Jade's charity fundraiser. Dean agrees to meet with Casey for an interview in the local café. She explains that it will be an inspiration piece about Dean and Jade's relationship as well as the power of a community. Casey discusses wanting to seek others' opinions too; Johnny Carter (Charlie Suff) offers to provide his opinion about Dean and gives Casey his contact card.
DC Crawford	25–26 March (2 episodes)	Calum Finlay	A detective constable who informs Ben Mitchell (Max Bowden) that there is an international warrant for his arrest. He then arrests him for fraud committed in the United States (US).
DS Moran	26 March	Sophie Fletcher	A detective sergeant who interviews Ben Mitchell (Max Bowden) after he is arrested for fraud committed in the United States (US). She informs him that his solicitor, Ritchie Scott (Sian Webber), is on her way.
Tash	28 March	Uncredited	A woman who is on a date with Peter Beale (Thomas Law). Peter introduces Tash to Lauren Branning (Jacqueline Jossa), the mother of his son, and Whitney Dean (Shona McGarty). Peter and Tash attend Lauren's 30th birthday party at The Prince Albert bar; while Peter chats to Lauren, Tash begins talking to another man.
Dr Carson	2 April	Gabby Wong	A doctor who performs an ultrasound on Sonia Fowler (Natalie Cassidy) prior to her implantation. She explains that her womb lining is not thick enough, but they can progress with the embryo transfer if she would like; Sonia is hesitant but her partner, Reiss Colwell (Jonny Freeman), wants to proceed so they do.
Stella Clayton	4 April − 2 October (7 episodes)	Velile Tshabalala	The wife of Pastor Gideon Clayton (Howard Saddler) who takes over Yolande Trueman's (Angela Wynter) food van project at her husband's request. He decides to put Stella in charge of the project after Yolande tells him that she feels uncomfortable due to his inappropriate advances. Stella takes Yolande's project folder, but she is unimpressed with it and calls it basic and old-fashioned. She adds that she may have a company interested in sponsoring the project. As Pastor Clayton and Yolande set up a church charity fundraiser at the community centre, Stella watches and is rude towards Yolande. The next day, Stella congratulates Yolande on the fundraiser; Yolande reveals that she is leaving the prayer group. Stella attends the opening of the church's community food truck. Yolande later sees Stella and Pastor Clayton, where they discuss Jordan Atkins' upcoming baptism.
Judge Holt	10–11 April (2 episodes)	Rachel Atkins	The judge presiding over the trial of Eddie Knight (Christopher Fairbank) and Charles Dunlane (Jack Chissick) for the historic racially motivated murder of Henry Kofi Asare. After George Knight (Colin Salmon) is questioned, Judge Holt calls a fifteen-minute break. She then oversees Eddie and Charles being found guilty.
Zoe Marchant	10 April	Holly Jane	The prosecuting barrister at the trial of Eddie Knight (Christopher Fairbank) and Charles Dunlane (Jack Chissick) for the historic racially motivated murder of Henry Kofi Asare. She questions Angela Lawal (Susan Anderin) and George Knight (Colin Salmon) on the stand.
Uncle Gordon	16 April	John Peters	The uncle of George Knight (Colin Salmon), via his adoptive mother Gloria Knight (Elizabeth Counsell). George invites Gordon to discuss Gloria's funeral, but instead Gordon brings George's belongings from Gloria's flat after being told to empty the flat by George's adoptive father, Eddie Knight (Christopher Fairbank).
Rufus	16 April − 14 May (4 episodes)	Ian Gain	A doorman who denies George Knight (Colin Salmon) entry to an underground fight. George tries to fight Rufus, but is pulled away by Phil Mitchell (Steve McFadden). Rufus later visits George the day after he engages in another underground fight. He gives George his winnings and offers him another fight for the following week. At the fight, Rufus explains what will happen to George and gives him some encouragement, before leading him to the ring. The opponent is revealed to be George's estranged son, Junior Knight (Micah Balfour), so George withdraws from the fight. Rufus is annoyed and demands that George repay him; Junior punches him and they escape.
Dolores	17 April	Natasha Williams	Two women who attend a prayer group led by Pastor Clayton (Howard Saddler). After the group, Dolores is raped by Pastor Clayton (Howard Saddler). She confides in Usha, who does not believe her as Pastor Clayton is much younger than Dolores. The scenes were part of a flashback set in 2001.
Usha	17 April	Sedhar Chozam	Two women who attend a prayer group led by Pastor Clayton (Howard Saddler). After the group, Dolores is raped by Pastor Clayton (Howard Saddler). She confides in Usha, who does not believe her as Pastor Clayton is much younger than Dolores. The scenes were part of a flashback set in 2001.
Sarah	17 April	Zoë Aldrich	Sarah is a woman who has been sexually assaulted by Pastor Clayton (Howard Saddler) and reports it to Daniel, a senior member of her church, who advises her not to take the allegation further. He explains that Pastor Clayton is transferring to another parish later that month anyway and she can be excused from attending services until then. The scenes were part of a flashback set in 2008.
Daniel	17 April	David Cann	Sarah is a woman who has been sexually assaulted by Pastor Clayton (Howard Saddler) and reports it to Daniel, a senior member of her church, who advises her not to take the allegation further. He explains that Pastor Clayton is transferring to another parish later that month anyway and she can be excused from attending services until then. The scenes were part of a flashback set in 2008.
Rachel	17 April	Debra Michaels	Rachel is a woman who has been sexually assaulted by Pastor Clayton (Howard Saddler) and confides in her friend, Fiona. Rachel had begun attending church after her sister died and found Pastor Clayton to be supportive and patient. Rachel worries that she led him on and believes that a court would accuse her of initiating a consensual relationship, but Fiona reassures Rachel that she has done nothing wrong. The scenes were part of a flashback set in 2012.
Fiona	17 April	Annie Miles	Rachel is a woman who has been sexually assaulted by Pastor Clayton (Howard Saddler) and confides in her friend, Fiona. Rachel had begun attending church after her sister died and found Pastor Clayton to be supportive and patient. Rachel worries that she led him on and believes that a court would accuse her of initiating a consensual relationship, but Fiona reassures Rachel that she has done nothing wrong. The scenes were part of a flashback set in 2012.
DC Carys	17 April	Helen Keeley	A detective constable who informs Delia Bennett (Llewella Gideon) that her report of sexual assault by Pastor Clayton (Howard Saddler) is not being pursued by the Crown Prosecution Service due to insufficient evidence. DC Carys reassures Delia that she still believes her. The scenes were part of a flashback set in 2016.
Emma	17 April	Gabrielle Lloyd	A married couple. Emma has been sexually assaulted by Pastor Clayton (Howard Saddler) and confides in Alec. He reacts angrily and tries to leave the house to confront Pastor Clayton, but is stopped by Emma who does not want him to get into trouble. The scenes were part of a flashback set in 2020.
Alec	17 April	Edward Peel	A married couple. Emma has been sexually assaulted by Pastor Clayton (Howard Saddler) and confides in Alec. He reacts angrily and tries to leave the house to confront Pastor Clayton, but is stopped by Emma who does not want him to get into trouble. The scenes were part of a flashback set in 2020.
Delia Bennett	17 April – 28 June (2 episodes)	Llewella Gideon	A woman who has been sexually assaulted by Pastor Clayton (Howard Saddler) and reports it to the police. DC Carys (Helen Keeley) informs Delia that there is insufficient evidence for her report, so the Crown Prosecution Service are not proceeding with it. Delia becomes frustrated, feeling that nobody believes her. The scenes were part of a flashback set in 2016. In the present day, Delia arranges to meet Yolande Trueman (Angela Wynter), who has also been sexually assaulted by Pastor Clayton, after being contacted by Levi (Mark Akintimehin), a church elder. Delia initially panics and feels hesitant to report Pastor Clayton again, so Yolande shares her experience and encourages Delia to join her in a joint report. Delia then reports Pastor Clayton's assault again with Yolande's support.
Dr Ahmed	22 April	Harj Dhillon	A doctor who treats Britney Wainwright (Lola Campbell) after she suffers a head injury riding her bike. Dr Ahmed questions Britney's carer, Whitney Dean (Shona McGarty), about Britney's medical history as she experiences flashes in her vision. He later diagnoses Britney with type II Usher syndrome and explains that there is no cure.
PC Green	22 April	Martin Trenaman	A police constable who is working at the 2024 London Marathon. When Billy Mitchell (Perry Fenwick) crosses the barriers to retrieve an engagement ring, PC Green arrests him for breaking safety protocols and stealing the ring. Billy then explains himself and why he is at the marathon to PC Green and after proving the ring belongs to him, he releases him.
Ostrich Man	22 April	Nick Helm	A man dressed in an ostrich costume who is arrested during the 2024 London Marathon and kept in a prison van with Billy Mitchell (Perry Fenwick). He tells Billy that he has kleptomania and stole a police officer's wallet. As Billy is leaving with his engagement ring, the man steals it from him and runs away.
Gabby Logan	22 April	Herself	Logan provides voiceover for the televised coverage of the 2024 London Marathon, which Jay Brown (Jamie Borthwick) and Honey Mitchell (Emma Barton) are competing in.
Lacey-Mae	24 April	Elsie Rumble	A classmate of Britney Wainwright (Lola Campbell) and Lexi Pearce (Isabella Brown) who mocks Britney and her glasses. When Lacey-Mae insults her, Britney attacks her. Britney tells her foster mother, Whitney Dean (Shona McGarty), about the incident, so Whitney threatens Lacey-Mae and warns her to stay away from Britney.
Wahida Idama	29 April	Sonia Kaur	A woman who meets Whitney Dean (Shona McGarty) and Zack Hudson (James Farrar) to discuss having a child with Usher syndrome after their foster daughter, Britney Wainwright (Lola Campbell), is diagnosed with it. Wahida explains that her son, Eeman, has the disorder and provides Whitney and Zack with advice on how to support Britney.
Mrs Rippon	30 April	Jacqui Dubois	A teacher from Walford High School who meets Whitney Dean (Shona McGarty) to discuss Britney Wainwright (Lola Campbell), following her Usher syndrome diagnosis. Mrs Rippon is under the impression that Britney is Whitney's daughter, but after Whitney leaves, Reiss Colwell (Jonny Freeman) accidentally reveals that Britney is not Whitney's biological daughter. Mrs Rippon then informs social services.
DC Porter	30 April	Delasi	A detective constable working in the child abuse investigations team who visits Whitney Dean (Shona McGarty) after it is discovered that Britney Wainwright (Lola Campbell), who is living with Whitney, is not her daughter. DC Porter and Mabel Cole (Alicia Brockenbrow), a social worker, confirm that they are trying to speak to Britney's mother, Keeley Wainwright (Kirsty J Curtis), but they are concerned about Whitney lying about Britney's mother to her school. DC Porter explains that in the absence of Keeley, he has taken out a police protection order to place Britney in emergency foster care.
Mabel Cole	30 April − 2 May (3 episodes)	Alicia Brockenbrow	A social worker who visits Whitney Dean (Shona McGarty) after it is discovered that Britney Wainwright (Lola Campbell), who is living with Whitney, is not her daughter. After Britney explains that her mother, Keeley Wainwright (Kirsty J Curtis), has agreed to the arrangement, Mabel and DC Porter (Alicia Brockenbrow) confirm that they are looking for Keeley to confirm this. Mabel explains that they are not concerned about Britney's wellbeing, but rather Whitney lying about being Britney's mother to her school. Britney is taken into emergency foster care. Mabel returns Britney the following day after Keeley confirms their story, and agrees that Britney can be fostered by Whitney and her partner, Zack Hudson (James Farrar), after speaking to them.
Olivia	1 May	Alina Allison	A woman who is blackmailing Nadine Keller (Jazzy Phoenix) for money. Nadine gives her some money in an envelope and Olivia asks for the rest of the money by the end of the week.
Ivy	2 May	Redd Lily Roche	A woman who Jay Brown (Jamie Borthwick) meets and flirts with in Peggy's nightclub. Jay takes Ivy to his office, where she offers him cocaine. Stevie Mitchell (Alan Ford) interrupts them, so Ivy leaves.
Olly Alexander	2 May	Himself	Alexander arrives at The Queen Victoria pub to see his friend, Johnny Carter, whilst rehearsing for his performance at the Eurovision Song Contest 2024 nearby. He explains that they had met in Manchester years previously. Alexander takes a selfie with Britney Wainwright (Lola Campbell) and chats with Penny Branning (Kitty Castledine).
Dr Brady	8 May	Helena Antoniou	A doctor who treats former boxer George Knight (Colin Salmon) after he collapses. After performing a CT scan, she suggests that he may have chronic traumatic encephalopathy and that another knock from fighting may be fatal.
Ebony	9−16 May (3 episodes)	Annika Whiston	A social media influencer who meets Denzel Danes (Jaden Ledega) to film some fitness content. Denzel's friend, Davinder "Nugget" Gulati (Juhaim Rasul Choudhury), films them at the gym, but Ebony becomes annoyed when he films landscape. She recommends to Denzel that they seek a more professional look. Amy Mitchell (Ellie Dadd), Denzel's girlfriend, and Lily Slater (Lillia Turner) see Ebony buying condoms and talking about a party at Denzel's house. Nugget interrupts another filming session between Ebony and Denzel, which frustrates her. Ebony later visits The Queen Victoria pub with Denzel, despite them both being underaged. They are interrupted by Denzel's parents, so Ebony leaves quickly.
Conrad	9 May	Ian Targett	A therapist who has an online therapy appointment with George Knight (Colin Salmon). George struggles with the session and leaves early.
Dolly Dean-Hudson	16–23 May	Uncredited	The daughter of Whitney Dean (Shona McGarty) and Zack Hudson (James Farrar). Whitney goes into labour whilst trapped in a food truck; she is freed and makes it to hospital, where Dolly is delivered. Whitney learns that Zack has cheated on her, so decides to move to Wakefield with Dolly and Britney Wainwright (Lola Campbell), her foster daughter.
Mrs Sakbar	28−30 May (2 episodes)	Viss Elliot Safavi	A doctor treating Nish Panesar (Navin Chowdhry) who informs his family that he has viral myocarditis and will need a transplant. However, she warns him that the chances of receiving a transplant before he dies are slim. Nish visits Mrs Sakbar days later for a consultation, joined by his son, Ravi Gulati (Aaron Thiara), and grandchildren, Davinder "Nugget" Gulati (Juhaim Rasul Choudhury) and Avani Nandra-Hart (Aaliyah James). Mrs Sakbar informs Nish that although he is eligible for the transplant list, his condition will deteriorate quickly and he would eventually require a portable oxygen tank.
Ronan	11 June	David Nellist	The leader of an Alcoholics Anonymous group that Sharon Watts (Letitia Dean) takes her friend, Linda Carter (Kellie Bright), to. He encourages Linda to contribute to the session and reassures her when she talks about her experiences.
PC Curnow	20 June	Nathalie Pownall	A police constable who takes Yolande Trueman's initial statement after she reports Pastor Clayton (Howard Saddler) for sexual assault. She explains that they will need to go a sexual assault referral centre (SARC) to make a formal statement as evidence. PC Curnow offers Yolande whatever support she needs to make the statement.
Kyle Fletcher	26 June	Freddie Hastwel	A classmate of Will Mitchell (Freddie Phillips) who catfishes Will into sending him a naked image, before blackmailing him for money. Will tells Phil Mitchell (Steve McFadden) about it, so Phil threatens Kyle with a baseball bat.
Rowena Beckley	26 June	Hollie Taylor	A nurse who contacts Teddy Mitchell (Roland Manookian) as Stevie Mitchell's (Alan Ford) next-of-kin, after he is hospitalised.
DC Wood	26 June	Adil Akram	A detective constable who investigates an assault on Stevie Mitchell (Alan Ford) and questions Phil Mitchell (Steve McFadden), who found Stevie after the assault.
Dr Raine	26−27 June (2 episodes)	Natalie Law	A doctor treating Stevie Mitchell (Alan Ford) following his attack. She informs his family that he is in a stable condition and should make a full recovery. The next day, Dr Raine updates Stevie's family on his progress.
Kevin Fletcher	27 June	Grant Gillespie	The father of Kyle Fletcher (Freddie Hastwel) who confronts Phil Mitchell (Steve McFadden) after Phil threatens Kyle. Kevin warns Phil to stay away from his son or he would pursue legal action.
PC Dudley	28 June	Sophie Harrison	A police constable who escorts Delia Bennett (Llewella Gideon) to make a statement against Pastor Clayton (Howard Saddler) for sexual assault.
Abdul Houssain	3 July (2 episodes)	Sanjiv Hayre	The husband of Maya Houssain (Bharti Patel). Maya previously told her friend Harvey Monroe (Ross Boatman) that her husband was dead. Harvey finds Maya's address and visits her house, but discovers a scared Abdul there. Maya explains that Abdul is the man who Harvey's son, Aaron Monroe (Charlie Wernham), tried to murder in a racially motivated attack. She tells Harvey that Abdul had broken ribs, a collapsed lung and was left blind in one eye.
Dr Miller	3−4 July (2 episodes)	Emma Williams	A doctor treating Davinder "Nugget" Gulati (Juhaim Rasul Choudhury) who discovers signs that there are issues with his kidneys and questions if he would be taking any drugs. Nugget's father, Ravi Gulati (Aaron Thiara), privately informs Dr Miller that Nugget may have been taking steroids. She later informs Nugget's family that he has Hyperkalemia and his kidneys are failing, as a result of taking steroids. The next day, Dr Miller informs Ravi and Nugget's mother, Priya Nandra-Hart (Sophie Khan Levy), that if Nugget's condition does not improve, they will need to devise a plan for long-term kidney dialysis. She also informs them that since Nugget took an illegal drug, she has made a referral to social services, who have informed the police.
DI Moore	4 July (2 episodes)	Mark Oxtoby	A detective inspector investigating Davinder "Nugget" Gulati's (Juhaim Rasul Choudhury) substance abuse after he is admitted to hospital. DI Moore explains that he wants to find the drug dealers and asks Nugget's parents, Ravi Gulati (Aaron Thiara) and Priya Nandra-Hart (Sophie Khan Levy), to convince Nugget to talk to the police. He speaks to Nugget, who refuses to give any details about where he received the drugs. When Ravi learns that Nugget's friend Denzel Danes (Jaden Ladega) supplied him with the drugs, he informs DI Moore, who arrests Denzel and arranges a search of his house. At the police station, DI Moore interviews Denzel, who complies with the investigation.
Julian	11 July	Matthew Jeans	Two potential lodgers for a spare room advertised by Reiss Colwell (Jonny Freeman) without the permission of his girlfriend, Sonia Fowler (Natalie Cassidy), who owns the house. Julian views the property and Reiss offers him the room, but when he sees Reiss acting suspiciously around Sonia, he declines the offer. Before he leaves, Bryony arrives for a viewing and warns them that she experiences night terrors.
Bryony	11 July	Georgie Taylforth	Two potential lodgers for a spare room advertised by Reiss Colwell (Jonny Freeman) without the permission of his girlfriend, Sonia Fowler (Natalie Cassidy), who owns the house. Julian views the property and Reiss offers him the room, but when he sees Reiss acting suspiciously around Sonia, he declines the offer. Before he leaves, Bryony arrives for a viewing and warns them that she experiences night terrors.
Frank Dunne	15 July	Tony Cook	A debt collector who repossess Lauren Branning's (Jacqueline Jossa) laptop after she fails to make appropriate repayments. He offers to let her keep the laptop for a £100 fee or for valid proof of work, but she cannot do either. Peter Beale (Thomas Law) pays the owed money to Frank for Lauren's laptop.
PC Keys	17 July	Karly Maguire	A police constable who takes Anna Knight's (Molly Rainford) statement after she is spiked. PC Keys informs her that they need to do forensic testing to see any drugs in Anna's system.
Nurse Jasmin	24−25 July (2 episodes)	Allyson Ava-Brown	A nurse at Debbie Colwell's (Jenny Meier) carehome who sees Sonia Fowler (Natalie Cassidy) leaving Debbie's room without having signed in. She warns Sonia that she must sign in upon entry to the carehome. As she takes a phonecall, she does not see Debbie's husband, Reiss Colwell (Jonny Freeman), leave Debbie's room after murdering her. When Reiss and Sonia visit the carehome after being informed of Debbie's death, Jasmin offers her condolences and explains that her room is a potential crime scene. Jasmin is then interviewed by DC Webster (Thanyia Moore).
DC Webster	25 July	Thanyia Moore	A detective constable investigating the death of Debbie Colwell (Jenny Meier). She speaks to Debbie's husband, Reiss Colwell (Jonny Freeman), and his partner, Sonia Fowler (Natalie Cassidy), about her death.
Lesley Drinkwater	25 July	Clare Corbett	A social worker who visits Kat Slater (Jessie Wallace) with DC Nwodo (Según Fawole) after her son, Tommy Moon (Sonny Kendall), makes a claim of physical abuse against her. Lesley collects a family history and reassures Kat that she is not judging her. When Tommy returns home, Lesley and DC Nwodo ask to speak to Tommy without Kat's presence. He tells them that he lied and retracts the accusation. Lesley explains that they are unable to close the case as it is the summer holidays, so will continue to support the family.
DC Nwodo	25 July	Según Fawole	A detective constable who visits Kat Slater (Jessie Wallace) with social worker Lesley Drinkwater (Clare Corbett) after her son, Tommy Moon (Sonny Kendall), makes a claim of physical abuse against her. When Tommy returns home, DC Nwodo and Lesley ask to speak to Tommy without Kat's presence. He tells them that he lied and retracts the accusation, so they leave.
DC Leeland	25−29 July (2 episodes)	Michele Whitehead	A detective constable investigating the death of Debbie Colwell (Jenny Meier). She and DC Webster (Thanyia Moore) speak to Debbie's husband, Reiss Colwell (Jonny Freeman), and his partner, Sonia Fowler (Natalie Cassidy), about her death. DC Leeland visits Reiss and Sonia the following day to inform them that they can now visit Debbie as a post-mortem has been completed.
Mr Morris	29 July	Darren Benedict	A man who has a business meeting with Nish Panesar (Navin Chowdhry), where they are joined by Nish's son, Vinny Panesar (Shiv Jalota). The meeting is interrupted by Priya Nandra-Hart (Sophie Khan Levy) criticising Nish, but Vinny persuades Mr Morris to continue the meeting elsewhere.
Fraser McLoughlin	5−7 August (2 episodes)	Greg Esplin	An associate of Dean Wicks (Matt Di Angelo) who visits Linda Carter (Kellie Bright) to offer her a deal: if she retracts her witness statement about seeing Dean kill Keanu Taylor (Danny Walters), Dean will confess to raping her. Fraser tries to make Linda doubt herself due to her persistent drinking. Linda's mother, Elaine Peacock (Harriet Thorpe), interrupts Fraser and Linda's confrontation, so he leaves. Linda later arranges to meet Fraser and agrees to the deal if he can provide the police with the signed statement from Dean first. Jack Branning (Scott Maslen), a detective inspector, then arrives to arrest Fraser for blackmail and perverting the course of justice.
Jennifer Sierwald	6 August	Marcia Lecky	A dentist who treats Annie Carter. She informs her mother, Linda Carter (Kellie Bright), that Annie will need four teeth removing and others are at risk as her teeth have not been taken care of. Jennifer refers Annie to the hospital and tells Linda that Annie will need an operation under general anaesthesia. Jennifer also smells alcohol on Linda, who is an alcoholic, but she brushes it off since she runs a pub.
Tamara	12−13 August (2 episodes)	Carryl Thomas	A solicitor who supports Linda Carter (Kellie Bright) ahead of her court appearance to make a statement against Dean Wicks (Matt Di Angelo) in his murder trial. Tamara discusses Linda's witness statement with her and her son Johnny Carter (Charlie Suff), but Linda becomes agitated after receiving threatening text messages. They take a break, but when they resume, Tamara realises that Linda is drinking alcohol and decides not to let her testify. The next day, Johnny visits Tamara alone and assures her that Linda will be sober by the trial. Tamara is still resistant to letting Linda testify, but Johnny eventually persuades her.
Éabha Donegan	14 August	Lesley Conroy	A nurse that treats Linda Carter (Kellie Bright) after she becomes unconscious following excessive drinking. Éabha reassures Linda's family that she is stable and lets her son, Johnny Carter (Charlie Suff), sit with her. When Linda becomes distressed, Éabha asks Johnny to leave.
DI Alston	21 August	Catherine Cusack	A detective inspector who interviews Reiss Colwell (Jonny Freeman) after he is arrested for the murder of his wife, Debbie Colwell (Jenny Meier). She informs Reiss that Debbie was smothered to death with a pillow and forensics show that DNA belonging to Reiss and his partner, Sonia Fowler (Natalie Cassidy), were found on the pillow. DI Alston asks Reiss about the IVF treatment that he and Sonia underwent to get pregnant, including how he afforded it, before discussing his movements on the night of Debbie's death. She later informs Reiss that he is being released on bail as there is insufficient evidence, but Sonia will not be released.
Sonny	21 August	Shri Patel	A solicitor representing Sonia Fowler (Natalie Cassidy) after she is arrested for the murder of Debbie Colwell (Jenny Meier). Sonia grows frustrated with Sonny and feels that he is not supporting her. He is then replaced by Maskell (Oliver Mott), who has been hired for Sonia.
Ronan	21 August	Joe Eyre	A solicitor representing Reiss Colwell (Jonny Freeman) after he is arrested for the murder of his wife, Debbie Colwell (Jenny Meier). When Reiss begins to talk openly about Debbie, Ronan advises him to stop. Reiss is then released without charge.
Maskell	21 August	Oliver Mott	A solicitor hired by Phil Mitchell (Steve McFadden) to represent Sonia Fowler (Natalie Cassidy), in replacement of her original duty solicitor Sonny (Shri Patel). Sonia and her partner, Reiss Colwell (Jonny Freeman), have both been arrested for the murder of Reiss' wife, Debbie Colwell (Jenny Meier). Maskell asks Sonia if there is a chance Reiss killed Debbie, but she denies it. Sonia is then charged with Debbie's murder.
Randall	22 August	Gethin Alderman	A solicitor hired by Gray Atkins (Toby-Alexander Smith) to arrange the sale of his house to Teddy Mitchell (Roland Manookian). Teddy asks Randall to speak to Gray about adding another term to the sale contract.
Mason	26 August−22 October (4 episodes)	Alex Draper	A man who Penny Branning (Kitty Castledine) promotes a club night at Peggy's winebar to. Avani Nandra-Hart (Aaliyah James) convinces Mason and his friend, Justin (Oscar Egboh), to attend the night. Mason and Justin meet Avani and her friend, Amy Mitchell (Ellie Dadd), at the club, but Avani is denied entry. He later appears as Avani's secret boyfriend when they are caught kissing by Barney Mitchell (Lewis Bridgeman), who warns him that she is only 15 years old, which he ignores.
Justin	26 August	Oscar Egboh	A man who Penny Branning (Kitty Castledine) promotes a club night at Peggy's winebar to. Avani Nandra-Hart (Aaliyah James) convinces Justin and his friend, Mason (Alex Draper), to attend the night. Justin and Mason meet Avani and her friend, Amy Mitchell (Ellie Dadd), at the club, but Avani is denied entry.
Dimitri	26 August	Cameron Anthony	A bouncer working at Peggy's winebar whilst they are hosting a club night. He denies Avani Nandra-Hart (Aaliyah James) entry after she calls him a "meathead". Dimitri is then instructed not to let anyone else into the overcrowded bar, but a crowd barges in regardless.
Doreen Coleman	5 – 16 September	Sonia Ritter	An older woman who is cellmates with Sharon Watts (Letitia Dean) when she is sentenced to a week in prison for contempt of court. She becomes friends with Sharon and helps her when she runs into her old enemy Chrissie Watts (Tracy-Ann Oberman).
Holly	10 October	Chloe Marshall	A woman who has been contacting David Wicks (Michael French). She video calls him and it is revealed that she is David's granddaughter via his son, Joe Wicks (Paul Nicholls).
Tyrion Ahmed	16–21 October (3 episodes)	Uncredited	The infant son of Habiba Ahmed (Rukku Nahar) and Jags Panesar (Amar Adatia) who comes to stay with his paternal grandparents, Suki Panesar (Balvinder Sopal) and Nish Panesar (Navin Chowdhry), for a few days.
DC Brian Perkins	24 October	Odimegwu Okoye	A police officer who visits Kat Mitchell (Jessie Wallace) regarding Tommy Moon's (Sonny Kendall) abusive behavior.
Felicity	11 November	Rose Shalloo	A friend of Harry Mitchell's (Elijah Holloway) missing ex-girlfriend Shireen. She confides in Penny Branning (Kitty Castledine) her suspicions against him.
