= Elijah Holloway =

British actor (born 1999)

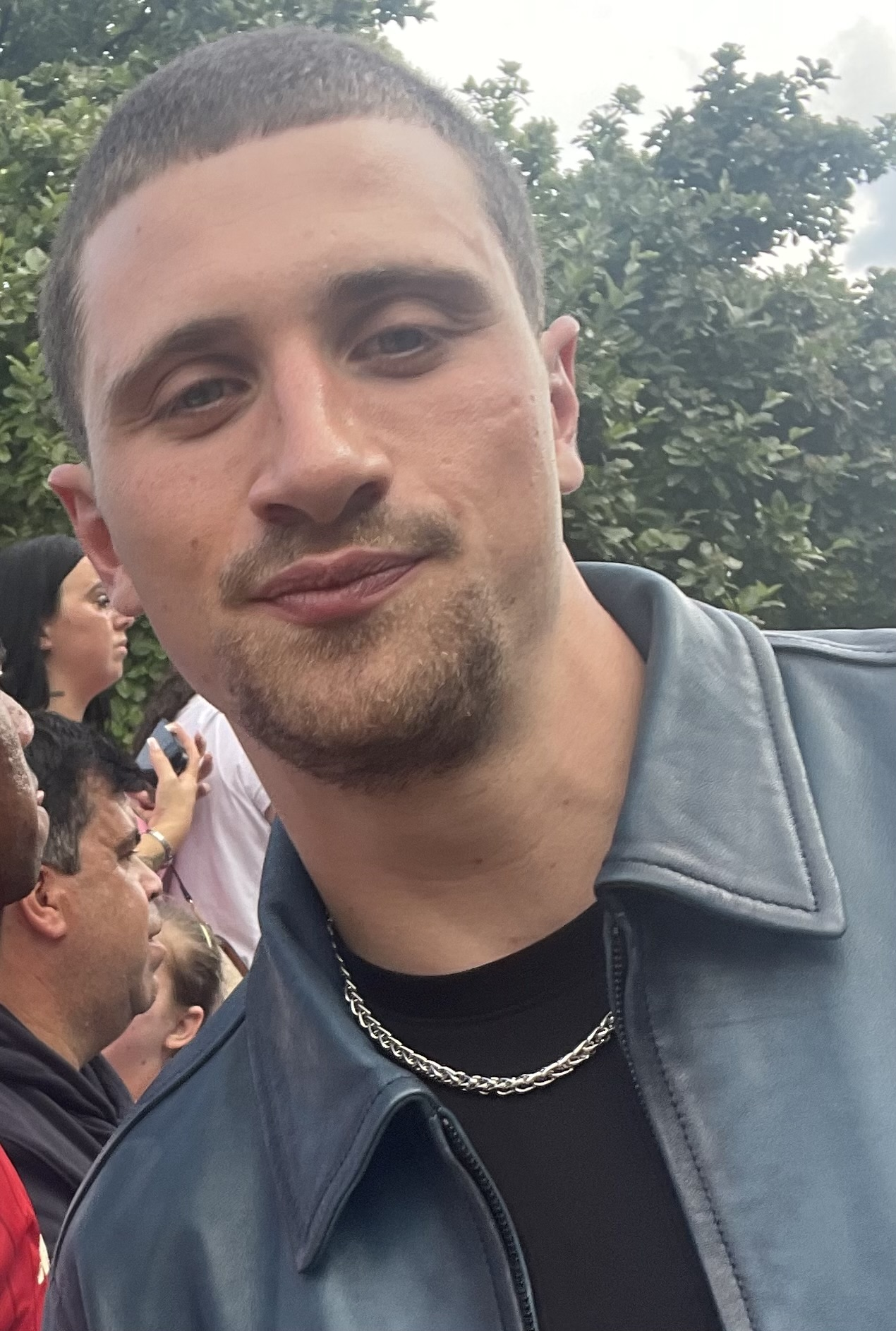
- Holloway in 2025
- Born: 1999 (age 26–27)
- Education: Rose Bruford College
- Occupation: Actor
- Years active: 2017–present
- Television: EastEnders (2024–present)

Elijah Holloway (born 1999) is a British actor, known for portraying the role of Harry Mitchell on the BBC soap opera EastEnders from 2024.

== Early life and education ==
Elijah Holloway was born in 1999. Holloway trained at Emil Dale Academy from 2014 and graduated from Rose Bruford College in 2019.

== Career ==
In 2016, Holloway auditioned in the BBC talent search Let It Shine. In 2023, he made his professional stage debut in the Headlong Theatre and Rose Theatre production of A View from the Bridge, directed by Holly Race Roughan. He portrayed the roles of Louis and one of the Immigration Officers, in a touring revival that premiered at the Octagon Theatre Bolton before transferring to Chichester Festival Theatre and the Rose Theatre, Kingston.

In June 2024, Holloway was cast as Harry Mitchell in the BBC soap opera EastEnders as part of the Mitchell family expansion. Since Holloway's debut, his storylines have included the introduction of Harry, his father Teddy Mitchell (Roland Manookian) and his brother Barney Mitchell (Lewis Bridgeman); a relationship with Penny Branning (Kitty Castledine); and the introduction of Harry's mother Nicola Mitchell (Laura Doddington). Holloway spoke out on joining the soap: "It's a massive privilege to join a British institution like EastEnders, and to be playing a Mitchell makes it even more exciting. We've been given such a warm welcome, and it's unbelievable to be turning up to work in Walford every day." Holloway also spoke out on his character, saying: "Harry has a lot of charm and swagger, but he's got a bit of a temper, too. He can't resist trouble, or the ladies, so he's ready to shake things up in typical Mitchell style!"

== Filmography ==
Year	Title	Role	Notes	Ref(s)
2018	Detective Dover	Officer	Film	
2024–present	EastEnders	Harry Mitchell	Regular role	
2025	This Morning	Himself		
2024	Dead	Bully	Guest role (1 episode)	
