= Antimatter (disambiguation) =

Antimatter is material composed of antiparticles in the same way normal matter is composed of particles.

Antimatter may also refer to:

- Antimatter (band), a UK art rock band
- Antimatter (album), a Cubanate album
- Antimatter (Star Trek novel), a Star Trek: Deep Space Nine novel written by John Vornholt
- "Anti-Matter", a song by American band The Aquabats from the album The Aquabats vs. the Floating Eye of Death!
- "Antimatter", a song by Swedish metal band Dragonland from the album Astronomy
- "Antimatter", a song by American metal band Silent Planet from the album Superbloom
- Anti-Matter, a 1996 compilation album featuring the band 108
- Anti Matter (film), a British science fiction thriller film
