= Episode 6867 =

- EastEnders episode
- Episode no.: Episode 6867
- Directed by: Abe Juckes
- Written by: Simon Ashdown
- Original air date: 4 March 2024
- Running time: 29 minutes

Guest appearances
- Patsy Palmer as Bianca Jackson; Lola Campbell as Britney Wainwright; Kirsty J Curtis as Keeley Wainwright; Mason Godfrey as Taylor Wainwright; Rebecca Clow as Ruth Bayford; Francis Tucker as Vince

Episode chronology
← Previous; Episode 6866	Next → Episode 6868

Episode 6867 of the BBC soap opera EastEnders originally aired on 4 March 2024. The episode, the first of a two-part special, features Whitney Dean (Shona McGarty) and Zack Hudson (James Farrar) visiting Bianca Jackson (Patsy Palmer) in Milton Keynes, where they are introduced to a neglected young girl, Britney Wainwright (Lola Campbell). Whitney forms a bond with Britney and tries to help her after becoming concerned for her welfare.

The episode was part of Whitney's exit storyline after McGarty had announced her departure the previous year. The episode marked the return of Palmer, who had not appeared in EastEnders since 2019. Palmer was excited to be reprising the role and McGarty enjoyed working with her again. The episode also featured the debut of Campbell's character Britney. McGarty teased that Britney's arrival and Whitney's desire to help her could cause trouble in her relationship with Zack. The end of the episode features a stunt that results in Whitney being run over by a car after saving Britney. McGarty revealed that she loves to do stunts and often asks if she can do them herself. Despite being set in Milton Keynes, the episode was filmed in the London Borough of Barnet.

The episode received negative feedback from residents of Milton Keynes as they felt that it was an inaccurate and insulting portrayal of their city. Many fans expressed their disappointment with the depiction and remarked that they would complain to the BBC. The controversy also gained attention from the MP for Milton Keynes North, Ben Everitt, who was unhappy with the city's portrayal in the soap. Everitt believed that EastEnders should apologise for the negative depiction and offered to host EastEnders producers so that they could see the best of the city, suggesting that they write another storyline about Milton Keynes. Everitt also mentioned the depiction in a debate in the House of Commons. Some viewers enjoyed the episode, with some believing that the depiction was partially realistic. Critics praised the return of Bianca, while fans were divided over Whitney's actions.

== Plot ==
The episode takes places over five weeks. Whitney Dean (Shona McGarty) and her fiancé Zack Hudson (James Farrar) visit Whitney's adoptive mother, Bianca Jackson (Patsy Palmer), in Milton Keynes, following Bianca's split from her partner, Terry Spraggan (Terry Alderton). Whitney tells Bianca that she is pregnant with Zack's baby and asks that Sonia Fowler (Natalie Cassidy), Bianca's half-sister, not be told this information as Sonia is struggling to conceive via IVF. Whitney and Zack meet Britney Wainwright (Lola Campbell) and her half-brother Taylor Wainwright (Mason Godfrey), Bianca's young neighbours. Bianca explains that they often come to her flat where she feeds them because their mother, Keeley Wainwright (Kirsty J Curtis), is neglectful.

Whitney becomes concerned when she sees Britney searching for food in a bin. Bianca takes Taylor and Britney in when they are locked out in the rain by Keeley. Angry by the neglect, Whitney confronts Keeley and offers support; Keeley rejects this and tells Whitney to mind her business. Whitney also meets Keeley's partner, Vince (Francis Tucker), who disturbs Whitney with his comment about Britney. Whitney then goes to the school that Britney is meant to be attending and meets the headteacher, Ruth Bayford (Rebecca Clow), who reveals that Britney has never attended. Ruth explains that Britney was withdrawn from school during the COVID-19 pandemic and did not return. Ruth calls pupils in this position "ghost children" and expresses her sadness that schools and social services do not have the resources to find them.

Zack gets frustrated as he wants to return to Walford but Whitney wants to help Britney. Thinking that Whitney is putting off returning due to not wanting to tell Sonia about the pregnancy, Bianca and Zack invite Sonia over. Whitney is angry when she finds out that they told her about her pregnancy. Sonia helps Britney when she comes to the flat with an injury on her leg. Whitney assumes that Keeley has been using Britney as a drug runner and confronts her. This leads to a fight where Bianca throws a brick through Keeley's window. Britney runs from the confrontation and tells Whitney that no one wants her. Whitney promises to be there for her and to protect her. Britney then steps in front of a speeding car so Whitney pushes her out of the way, being run over in the process. The episode ends with Sonia, Zack and Bianca trying to help and calling an ambulance for an unconscious Whitney.

== Production ==
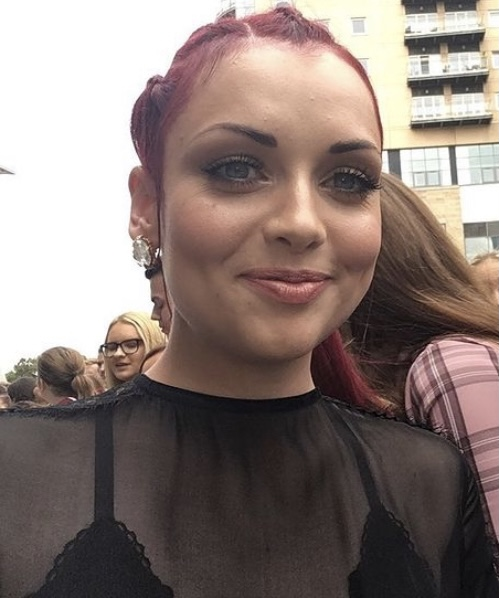
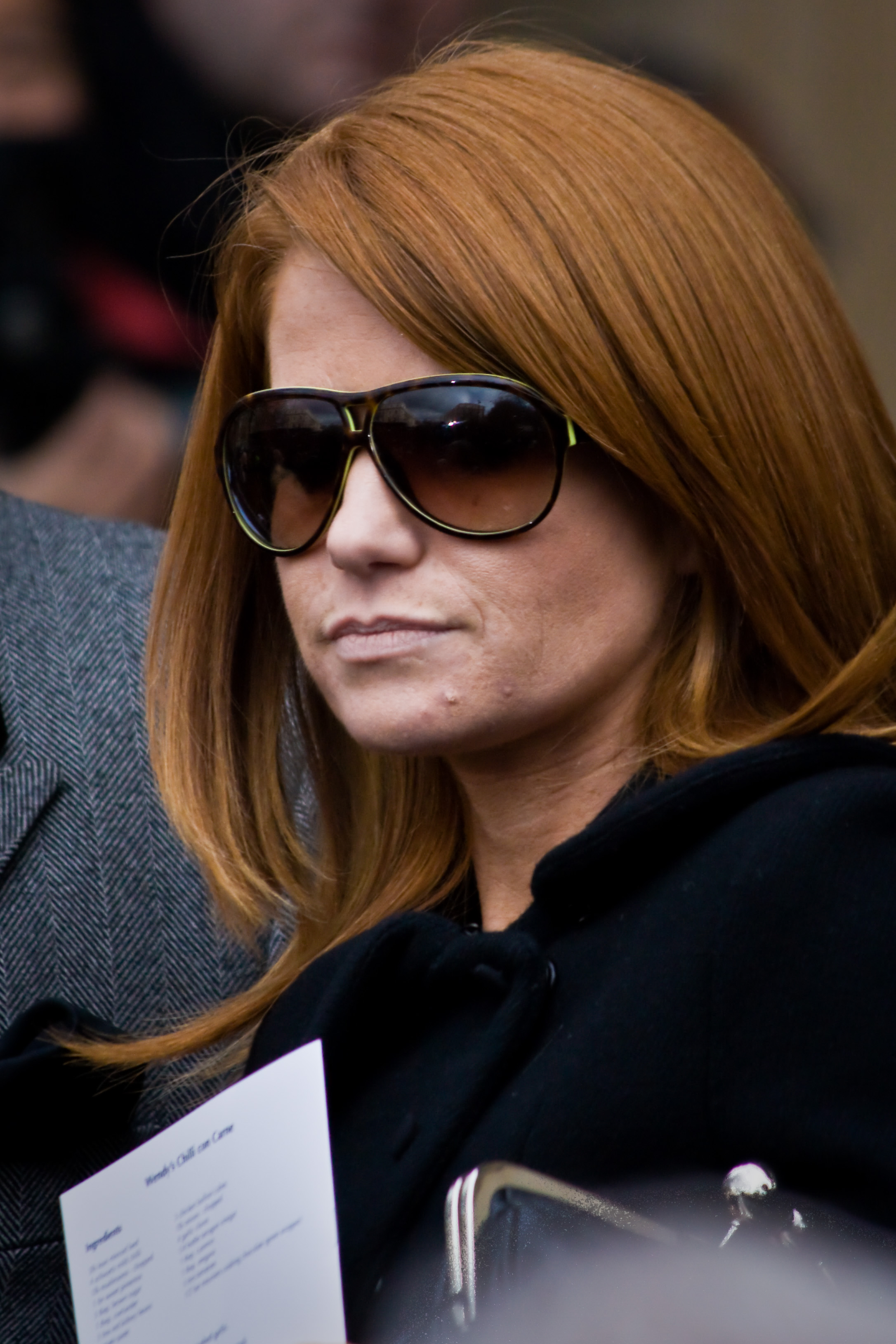
Shona McGarty (right) and Patsy Palmer (left) portray Whitney and Bianca, respectively.

The episode was announced in January 2024 as the first episode of a two-part special focussing on Whitney Dean (Shona McGarty). McGarty announced her departure from the soap in 2023, with it being suggested that the episode plot could be the catalyst of Whitney's exit storyline. The episode originally aired on Monday 4 March 2024 at 7:30 pm on BBC One. It differs from the usual EastEnders format as it shows events from across five weeks. Despite being set elsewhere, the episodes were filmed in the London borough of Barnet.

It was also announced in January 2024 that the episode would feature the return of Patsy Palmer as Bianca Jackson, the adoptive mother of Whitney, who first appeared on the soap in 1993. In the EastEnders universe, Zack and Whitney had visited Bianca in January 2024, with the episode showing what has happened over the preceding five weeks and revealing what has kept them away for so long. Bianca's return allowed the soap to show updates on Bianca's life, which also featured a reunion between the character and her half-sister Sonia Fowler. Bianca had been depicted as living in Milton Keynes since her departure from Albert Square in 2014.

At the time of the announcement, Palmer had already begun filming, with it being reported that the episode would be the beginning of her "short stint". EastEnders executive producer Chris Clenshaw was happy for Bianca's return, calling her "iconic" and a "fan favourite". Palmer called her return to the soap a "fresh experience" in "exactly the same place", explaining that she had a different mindset from when she was last on the soap. McGarty enjoyed working with Palmer and felt like she was 16 years old again. She added that Palmer had a "LA, Malibu glow" which she had brought to the soap set. McGarty believed that the episode would remind viewers about Whitney and Bianca's relationship.

The episode featured the debut of Lola Campbell as Britney Wainwright. Campbell had previously done an impression of the EastEnders moment where Kat Slater (Jessie Wallace) tells Zoe Slater (Michelle Ryan) that she is her mother, which led to Campbell being cast in the comedy-drama film Scrapper. McGarty revealed to Inside Soap that Britney reminds Whitney of herself at that age, and that she feels sorry for her and wants to help and take "her under her wing".

The episode's cliffhanger featured the fate of Whitney and her baby left uncertain after she is hit by a car. McGarty had previously teased that there would be a stunt in the run up to Whitney's departure. The actress explained that she "absolutely" loves doing stunts, calling them her "favourite thing to do", and explained that the crew would often have to stop her from doing them. Sarah Ellis from Inside Soap revealed that Whitney's near-death experience leads her to question her future, hinting that it could possibly change the course of her life.

== Reception and controversy ==
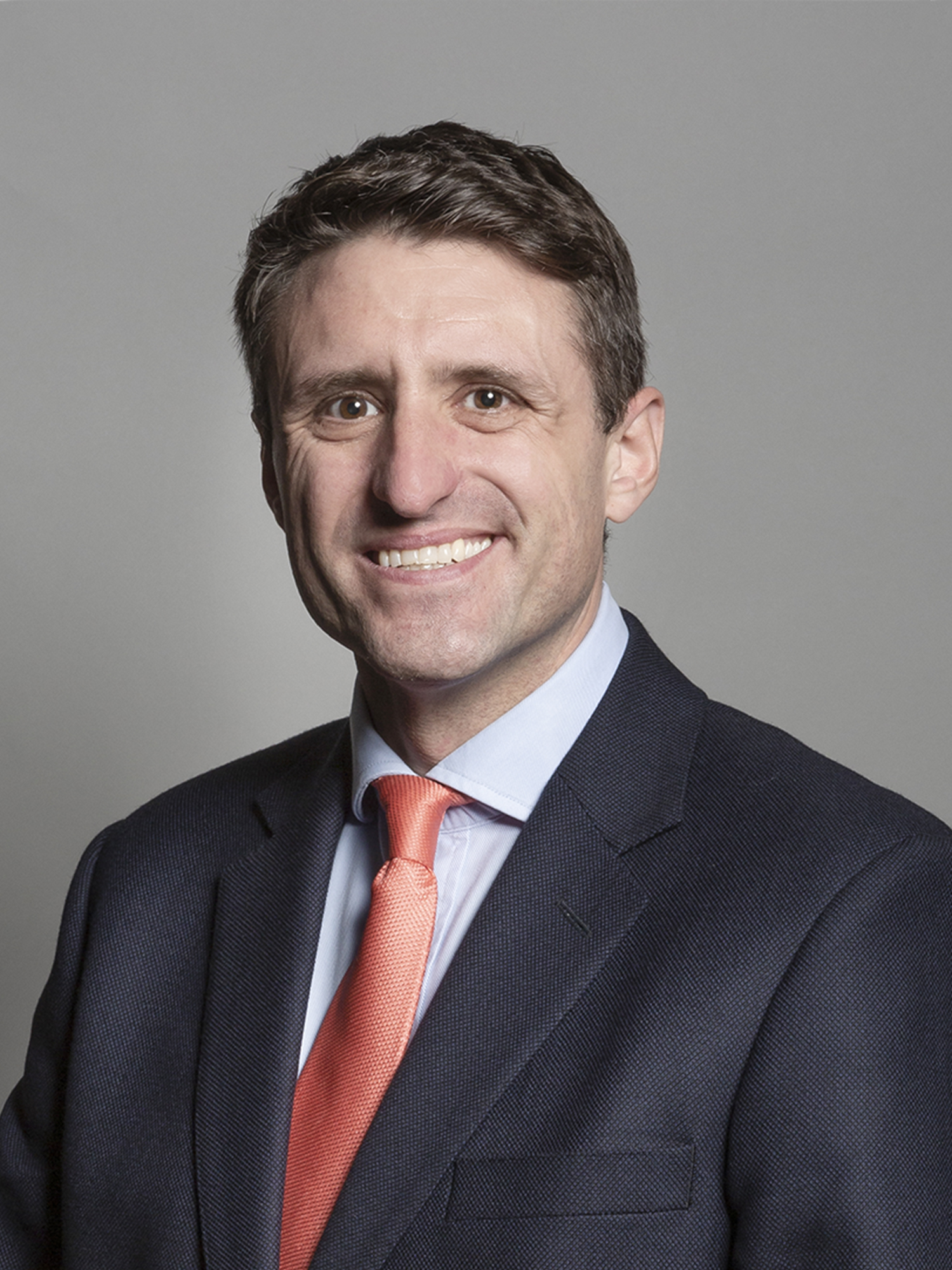
MP Ben Everitt was disappointed over Milton Keynes's portrayal in the episode.

Following the announcement of Bianca's return, Joe Anderton from Digital Spy noted how Bianca was Palmer's "famous role". Laura-Jayne Tyler from Inside Soap commented that Whitney's hit-and-run scene would "haunt" her "nightmares". Lewis Knight from Radio Times blamed Whitney's "kind heart" for throwing her into "harm's way". Chloe Timms from Inside Soap reported on how viewers were divided on Whitney putting her baby in danger, with some understanding Whitney wanting to help Britney while others criticised her actions. Timms questioned whether Whitney would be "destined" to be a single mother if Zack did not decide to foster Britney with her. Timms also reported on how viewers generally enjoyed the return of Bianca. Angie Quinn from MyLondon believed that the episodes were exciting and popular with viewers and wrote that viewers had "been treated to special episodes taking place outside of Walford", but noted that they were not all "bowled over" by them due to the depiction of the city. Quinn also called Britney "mouthy" and noted the "sad contents of [Bianca's] nearly-empty" fridge and Zack's car being vandalised by "rowdy youths" after arriving in the "seemingly grotty" area.

Local viewers of Milton Keynes were unhappy with the depiction of the city and commented on Britney's behaviour. Viewers were shocked to see at the inclusion of rundown flats that were not situated in Milton Keynes. Murrer also called Keely and Vince "grubby, drug-addled pair of neighbours" who neglect Britney and use her as a drugrunner, and commented on how the episode concludes "just as miserably" due to Whitney being run over. In response, EastEnders press office confirmed that the episodes were not filmed in Milton Keynes, and a spokesperson refused to comment on whether they believed the episodes were a fair portrayal of the town. Some residents remarked that they would be complaining to the BBC about the depiction of the city, while others expressed on social media that they enjoyed the episodes and that the soap was accurate with certain parts of Milton Keynes. Destination Milton Keynes, the city's official tourism service, noted that while it was up to EastEnders to choose how they portray Milton Keynes, the city is a "thriving, multi-cultural community" and called it one of the "fastest-growing and most prosperous cities in the UK".

Ben Everitt – the MP for Milton Keynes North – was unhappy with the portrayal of Milton Keynes. Everitt called on the BBC to apologise for its portrayal of the city, and that he would contact EastEnders producers to suggest writing a storyline about the positive parts of Milton Keynes, and would host them on a tour of the city. Everitt said that while the depiction was not a big political issue, it was still important for him to have the city represented fairly, even if it was fiction. The MP criticised the depiction in Parliament.
