= Ninette Finch =

English actress (born 1933)

- Born: Ninette Ann Iles; 17 May 1933 (age 93); Croydon, Surrey, England
- Occupation: Actress
- Years active: 1999–present
- Spouse: Ronald Finch (m. 1960)
- Children: 2

Ninette Ann Finch (née Iles; born 17 May 1933) is an English actress, known for being one of the most prolific television extras in the United Kingdom. After retiring from her job at a bank, she became an extra and has since appeared in over 1,000 television shows and films. Her notable roles include Augusta Longbottom in the film Harry Potter and the Deathly Hallows – Part 2 and Annie in the Channel 4 comedy series Derek (2012–2014). She has also appeared in the BBC soap opera EastEnders as recurring character Beryl.

== Early life ==
Finch was born Ninette Ann Iles on 17 May 1933 in Croydon, Surrey, to Francis and Helen Iles (née Ridley).

== Career ==
Finch has since established herself as one of Britain's most frequent television extras, having appeared in over 1,000 television shows, films and advertisements in a career spanning over two decades. Her credits include Downton Abbey, Holby City, The Basil Brush Show, Dick & Dom in da Bungalow. She has also appeared in the films Finding Neverland (2004) and Les Misérables (2012).

Finch appeared as a muggle in Harry Potter and the Half-Blood Prince in 2009 and subsequently went on to appear as Augusta Longbottom in Harry Potter and the Deathly Hallows – Part 2 in 2011. Between 2012 and 2014, she appeared in the Channel 4 sitcom Derek as Annie. From 2018 to 2020, she portrayed Mrs Watson in the comedy series King Gary. In 2020, she appeared in an episode of the BBC comedy Mandy, before returning to appear as a mourner in the Christmas special episode, before making a further appearance in the third series in which she portrayed Margaret. She also portrayed Shakey in The Great. Finch has appeared in several episodes of EastEnders, most as recurring character Beryl since August 2024. In 2026, she starred in the music video for Jazz Emu's song "Here It Comes".

== Personal life ==
Finch married Ronald Finch in 1960 and the couple had two children, Simon and Gabrielle. Simon is an actor and encouraged Finch to begin working as an extra in 1999 after she retired from her job as a cashier at HSBC and needed a hobby. She resides in Wallington, London, and has four grandchildren.

== Selected filmography ==
Year	Title	Role	Notes
2007	I Am Bob	Queen Victoria	Short film
2009	Harry Potter and the Half-Blood Prince	Muggle	Film role
2009–2010	Getting On	—N/a	3 episodes
2010	The Morgana Show	Various	5 episodes
2011	Harry Potter and the Deathly Hallows – Part 2	Augusta Longbottom	Film role
2012–2014	Derek	Annie	Recurring role
2012	Les Misérables	—N/a	Film role
2013	Filled-In	Granny	Short film
2014	Unforgettable Mind	—N/a	Short film
2014	Birds of a Feather	Winnie	Episode: "Slave"
2016	Going Forward	Neighbour	1 episode
2017	Uncle	Someone's Gran	Episode: "Is This Just Fantasy?"
2017	Finding Your Feet	Care Home Resident	Film role
2017	Mrs Taylor	Mrs Taylor	Short film
2018–2020	King Gary	Mrs. Watson	Recurring role
2018	Juliet, Naked	Old Lady	Film role
2018	Famalam	—N/a	1 episode
2018	Dorothy's Theory	Dorothy's Grandmother	Short film
2019	After Life	Newsagent	1 episode
2019	This Time with Alan Partridge	Old Lady	2 episodes
2019	Home	Old Lady	1 episode
2019	Hope Gap	Headscarf Lady	Film role
2019	This Is the Winter	Crying Lady	Short film
2019	A Christmas Carol	Old Lady	2 episodes
2020–2021, 2024	Mandy	Old Mourner / Margaret	3 episodes
2021	Paul Dood's Deadly Lunch Break	Old Woman on Platform	Film role
2021	Cruella	Lady	Film role
2021	Ted Lasso	Gladys	1 episode
2021	The Great	Shakey	2 episodes
2021	Reduced to Clear	Old Lady	Short film
2022	Call the Midwife	Mildred Jones	1 episode
2022	Here We Go	Bren	Episode: "Granny's New Boyfriend"
2022	Bloods	Eileen	1 episode
2022	Mammals	Mrs. Geddis	1 episode
2022	The Carer	Mary	Short film
2024–present	EastEnders	Beryl	Recurring role
2024	The Union	Lady in Ching Court	Film role
2024	Changing Ends	Old Woman	Episode: "Better the Neville You Know"

=== Music videos ===
Year	Song	Artist	Ref.
2026	"Here It Comes"	Jazz Emu	
