= Lola Campbell =

British actress

Lola Campbell (born 2010/2011) is a British child actress. She made her screen debut in the 2023 British comedy-drama film Scrapper, filmed when she was twelve years-old. For the role she was nominated for breakthrough performance awards at the British Independent Film Awards and by the London Film Critics Circle.

== Early life ==
Campbell lives with her family in Sheering, near Bishop's Stortford. She is a pupil at The Leventhorpe School in Sawbridgeworth in Hertfordshire. She had not appeared in a school play before her film debut, but began to record and produce videos in lockdown during the COVID-19 pandemic.

== Career ==
Campbell auditioned for the 2023 British comedy-drama film Scrapper after one of her mother's friends directed her towards a Facebook casting call for “a bit of a mess about”. Campbell was cast in the film after impressing writer/director Charlotte Regan by acting out a well-known scene from soap-opera EastEnders in which the character Kat Slater (Jessie Wallace) tells Zoe Slater (Michelle Ryan), "I'm your mother!", with Campbell playing both roles during the audition. She also discussed with Regan her love of the department store Home Bargains. During filming she was twelve years-old. For her role in the film as Georgie, Campbell received critical praise, with Jonathan Romney in The Financial Times describing her as an "astonishing discovery" who "excels". Claire Shaffer in The New York Times said she played the role "wonderfully", and Deborah Ross in The Spectator used "terrific, fresh, naturalistic, winning". Campbell appeared opposite Harris Dickinson, who played her estranged father, Jason, and the pair’s scenes together were highly improvised. They were nominated for the Best Joint Lead Performance Award at the 2023 British Independent Film Awards, and she was individually nominated for Breakthrough Performance. She was also nominated for the Young British/Irish Performer of the Year award at the London Film Critics Circle Awards 2023

Campbell made her debut performance as Britney Wainwright in the BBC soap opera, EastEnders, in the episode airing on 4 March 2024.

== Filmography ==
Year	Title	Role	Notes
2023	Scrapper	Georgie	
2024	EastEnders	Britney Wainwright	Recurring role

== Awards and nominations ==
Year	Award	Category	Nominated work	Result	Ref.
2023	British Independent Film Awards	Best Joint Lead Performance (shared with Harris Dickinson)	Scrapper	Nominated	
2023	British Independent Film Awards	Breakthrough Performance	Scrapper	Nominated	
2023	London Film Critics Awards	Young British/Irish Performer of the Year	Scrapper	Won	
