= Anti Matter (film) =

- Blu-ray disk cover
- Directed by: Keir Burrows
- Written by: Keir Burrows
- Produced by: Dieudonnée Burrows
- Starring: Yaiza Figueroa; Philippa Carson; Tom Barber-Duffy; Noah Maxwell Clarke; James Farrar
- Cinematography: Gerry Vasbenter
- Edited by: Rhys Barter
- Music by: Edwin Sykes
- Production company: The Cast Iron Picture Co.
- Distributed by: Uncork'd Entertainment
- Release date: 23 September 2016 (Raindance Film Festival)
- Running time: 109 min.
- Country: United Kingdom
- Language: English
- Budget: £50,000
- Box office: $22,384

Anti Matter is a 2016 British science fiction thriller film written and directed by Keir Burrows. The film premiered at Raindance Film Festival on 23 September 2016 and was theatrically released in 2017.

== Plot ==
Studying a new battery material at the Oxford University, Ana, a PhD student, discovers the ability of the new material to create wormholes. She invites other students to help her, and the group starts experimenting with moving large objects and even a cat through the spatial tunnels. The team quickly progresses with testing the new technology from animals to humans, and Ana volunteers to be the first human being to travel via a wormhole. The experiment seems to be successful, but, after her return, Ana cannot remember the events of the last days and eventually spirals into an intense paranoia.

== Cast ==
- Yaiza Figueroa as Ana
- Philippa Carson as Liv
- Tom Barber-Duffy as Nate
- Noah Maxwell Clarke as Stovington
- James Farrar as James the Righteous

== Reception ==
Anti Matter received positive reviews from critics. On Rotten Tomatoes, the film holds an approval rating of 88% based on 24 reviews.

Franck Scheck of The Hollywood Reporter stated, "Boasting impressive visuals and special effects, Anti Matter overcomes its familiar narrative aspects with an imaginative style that fully draws us into its complex storyline. The film proves that sophisticated sci-fi can be terrifying without relying on cheap jump scares." Noel Murray of Los Angeles Times wrote, "Because the actors deliver every line in a breathless rush, their performances are monotone; and because Burrows throws in new characters and ideas every few minutes, the resolution to this story comes out rushed and goofy, and not as poignant as intended. “Anti Matter” shows promise though — even when it’s more “interesting” than entertaining." Jonathan Barkan of Dread Central added, "A good mixture of horror and sci-fi can be difficult to obtain. While both often have a foundation in the fear of the unknown, horror usually focuses on primal instincts and urges whereas science fiction is often centered around the pursuit of something grander and more cerebral. When those ideals come together in clever ways, the two genres marry into a cohesive unit that can raise the hairs on the back of your neck while at the same time stimulate your brain and leave you guessing until the very end."
