= Jonny Freeman =

British actor and comedian

- Born: London, England
- Occupation: Actor
- Known for: M.I. High; EastEnders

Jonny Freeman is an English actor and comedian. He is best known for his role as Frank London in the children's CBBC TV series M.I. High, and as Reiss Colwell in the BBC soap opera EastEnders.

== Life and career ==
Freeman trained at the East 15 Acting School. In addition to his work as an actor, Freeman appears with the London improvisational comedy group Shotgun Impro and is a resident MC at The Funny Side Comedy Clubs.

He has also appeared in Dalziel & Pascoe, Doctors and Love Soup, as well as several television adverts for Domino's Pizza, Ford and Trebor mints.

On 22 November 2022, it was announced that he had been cast as Dot Cotton's great-nephew Reiss Colwell in EastEnders. His first episode was on 12 December 2022. On 20 February 2025, during the EastEnders 40th anniversary, the character died during the Queen Victoria structural collapse.

== Filmography ==
- Dalziel and Pascoe episode "Dead Meat"
- Doctors
- Holby City
- Love Soup
- M.I. High
- Silent Witness
- The Wright Stuff
- EastEnders

== Awards and nominations ==
Year	Award	Category	Result	Ref.
2023	British Soap Awards	Best Comedy Performance	Nominated	
