= Lewis Bridgeman =

English actor (born 2007)

- Born: 2006 or 2007 (age 19–20); Maldon, Essex, England
- Occupation: Actor
- Years active: 2020–present

Lewis Bridgeman (born 2007) is an English actor. At age 14, he joined the National Youth Theatre after gaining a place by getting through auditions and completing their acting intake course in the summer of 2021. He has been a member of the Chelmsford Theatre Workshop at The Old Court Theatre in Chelmsford, Essex and performed in productions including The Wind in the Willows, Posh and Arcadia. In 2024, he joined the cast of the BBC soap opera EastEnders as Barney Mitchell. As well as acting, Bridgeman was accepted into Mensa at the age of 12.

== Early life ==
Bridgeman was born in Maldon, Essex, where he attended Plume School. Since the age of six, he has had aspirations to become either a drama teacher or an actor. At GCSE level, he achieved four grade 9s, two grade 8s, two grade 7s and one grade 6. These exams included studying drama, which he also studied for his A-levels. He also attended the Chelmsford Drama Centre at weekends. He is autistic and dyspraxic, which meant he struggled socially at school. His mother feared he would have a bad experience at Plume; however, she said they were "amazing" for him. Aged 12, he took Mensa International's acceptance test and passed, meaning his IQ is above 132 and that he is in the top 2% of the general population in terms of intelligence, as measured by IQ. His mother credited Mensa with instilling a confidence in him.

== Career ==
In 2021, aged 14, Bridgeman joined the National Youth Theatre and is set to be a member until he is 26. He has appeared in various theatre productions including The Wind in the Willows, Posh, Goodnight Mister Tom and Arcadia. Despite struggling in social situations due to his autism, he was seen to be confident whilst performing. In 2022, he read letters from radio archives for Forecast22, a digital artwork and interactive website celebrating the centenary of the first UK public radio broadcasts. In 2024, he was cast in the BBC soap opera EastEnders. He was cast as Barney Mitchell, a member of the established Mitchell family. Bridgeman described his character as "introverted", contrasting the rest of the family, and was looking forward to developing the character. During his first few weeks of filming, he was also sitting his A-level exams, which he passed.

== Filmography ==
=== Television ===
Year	Title	Role	Notes
2024–present	EastEnders	Barney Mitchell	Regular role

== Stage ==
Year	Title	Role	Venue
2020	Rosencrantz and Guildenstern Are Dead	The Player	Old Court Theatre
2022	The Wind in the Willows	Badger	Old Court Theatre
2022	Posh	Toby Maitland	Chelmsford Theatre
2022	Goodnight Mister Tom	William	Chelmsford Theatre
2023	Arcadia	Gus/Augustus Cloverly	Chelmsford Theatre
