= James Farrar (actor) =

English actor

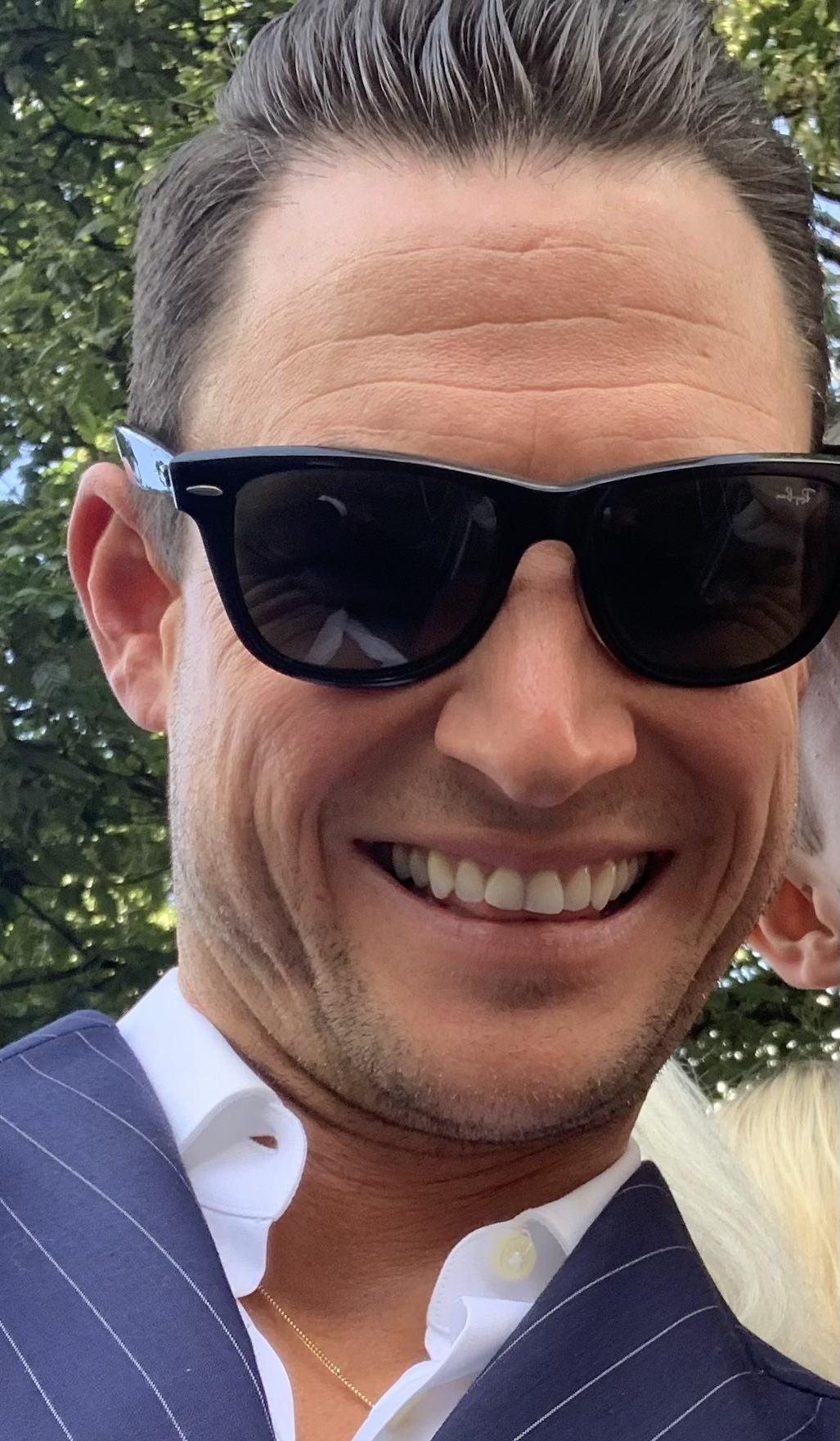
- Farrar in 2022
- Born: James Castling Farrar; 19 June 1987 (age 39); Greenwich, London, England
- Education: Royal Central School of Speech and Drama
- Occupations: Actor; model
- Years active: 2011–present
- Television: Hollyoaks; EastEnders
- Spouse: Ali Roff Farrar (m. 2017)
- Children: 1

James Castling Farrar (born 19 June 1987) is an English actor and model, known for his role as Liam Gilmore in the Channel 4 soap opera Hollyoaks. He rose to prominence in 2021 for his portrayal of Zack Hudson in the BBC soap opera EastEnders.

== Early life and education ==
Farrar was born on 19 June 1987 in Greenwich, London. He undertook a drama and media studies degree at the University of Portsmouth graduating in 2008. He graduated from the Royal Central School of Speech and Drama in 2010.

== Career ==
Prior to acting, Farrar worked as a model. He made his acting debut in an episode of EastEnders as Brendan, before appearing in a number of short films including Donkey, Dominic and Loser. In 2011, he joined the cast of the Channel 4 soap opera Hollyoaks as Liam Gilmore. He left the role in 2013.

In 2021, he joined the BBC One soap opera EastEnders as Zack Hudson, the long lost half-brother of Sharon Watts (Letitia Dean) and son of Gavin Sullivan (Paul Nicholas).

== Personal life ==
Farrar is also a qualified personal trainer and vegan chef. He married Ali Roff Farrar in 2017 and they have a daughter born in 2021.

== Filmography ==
Year	Title	Role	Notes
2011	EastEnders	Brendan	Episode: 11 November 2011
2011	Donkey	David	Short film
2011	Dominic	Will	Short film
2012	Loser	Ashley	Short film
2012–2013	Hollyoaks	Liam Gilmore	Series regular
2013	By Any Means	Andy	Season 1, episode 6
2014	Bin Men	Mick	Short film
2015	Silent Witness	Dean Fallon	Episode: "One of our Own (Parts I & II)"
2016	Anti Matter	James the Righteous	
2016	Doctors	Steven Cropper	Episode: "Sparks"
2017	Call the Midwife	Lester Watts	Season 6, episode 1
2021	Blank Shores	Connor	Short film
2021	Off Your Head		Post-production
2021–present	EastEnders	Zack Hudson	Regular role
2025	EastEnders: 40 Years on the Square	Himself	Interviewed Guest

== Awards and nominations ==
Year	Award	Category	Result	Ref.
2021	Inside Soap Awards	Best Newcomer	Longlisted	
2021	I Talk Telly Awards	Best Soap Newcomer	Nominated	
2021	Digital Spy Reader Awards	Best Soap Newcomer	Won	
2022	Inside Soap Awards	Best Double Act (shared with James Bye)	Longlisted	
2023	The British Soap Awards	Best Leading Performer	Longlisted	
2023	National Television Awards	Serial Drama Performance	Longlisted	
2023	Inside Soap Awards	Best Actor	Longlisted	
2024	TV Choice Awards	Best Soap Actor	Longlisted	
