= Sharon Watts =

- EastEnders character
- Portrayed by: Letitia Dean
- Duration: 1985–1995; 2001–2006; 2012–present
- First appearance: Episode 1 "Poor Old Reg"; 19 February 1985
- Created by: Tony Holland
- Introduced by: Julia Smith (1985); John Yorke (2001); Bryan Kirkwood (2012)
- Book appearances: Blind Spots (1986); Solid Ground (1988); Blood Ties: The Life and Loves of Grant Mitchell (1998)
- Spin-off appearances: Dimensions in Time (1993); The Mitchells – Naked Truths (1998); Slaters in Detention (2003); The Big Albert Square Dance (2013); Once Upon a Time in Albert Square (2018); TV Soundtracks EastEnders: The Six (2023)
In-universe information
- Other names: Sharon Mitchell; Sharon Rickman; Sharon Beale
- Occupation: Student; Travel agent; Cashier; Barmaid; Pub landlady; Businesswoman; Bar owner; Gym owner
- Family: Watts; Mitchell; Beale
- Father: Gavin Sullivan
- Mother: Carol Hanley
- Adoptive father: Den Watts
- Adoptive mother: Angie Watts
- Stepmother: Kathy Beale; Chrissie Watts (adoptive)
- Half-brothers: Zack Hudson; Kristopher Hanley; Jonathan Hanley; Dennis Rickman (adoptive)
- Half-sisters: Diane Hanley; Vicki Fowler (adoptive)
- Husband: Grant Mitchell (1991–1995); Dennis Rickman (2005); Phil Mitchell (2014–2020); Ian Beale (2020–2021)
- Sons: Dennis Rickman Jnr; Albie Watts
- Stepsons: Ben Mitchell; Raymond Dawkins; Peter Beale; Bobby Beale
- Stepdaughters: Louise Mitchell
- Granddaughters: Alyssa Lennox
- Grandmothers: Ivy Sullivan
- Aunts: Margaret Midhurst; Sally Sullivan
- Nephews: Barney Mitchell
- Nieces: Dolly Dean-Hudson

Sharon Watts (also Mitchell, Rickman, and Beale) is a fictional character from the BBC One soap opera EastEnders, played by Letitia Dean. Sharon was one of EastEnders' original characters, conceptualised by creators Tony Holland and Julia Smith. She first appeared in the first episode broadcast on 19 February 1985 as the teenage adopted daughter of Queen Vic landlords Den (Leslie Grantham) and Angie Watts (Anita Dobson). Dean originally quit the role in 1995 after ten years before returning for a second stint between 2001 and 2006. Dean returned to the role for a third time in 2012 and has remained on the serial since.

Sharon became prominent in the 1990s due to her becoming the landlady of the Queen Victoria public house and her romantic pairings with brothers Grant (Ross Kemp) and Phil Mitchell (Steve McFadden). In a storyline dubbed "Sharongate", Sharon married Grant and then had an affair with Phil, climaxing in 1994 with Grant's discovery of the affair, which remains one of EastEnders' highest-viewed episodes; the storyline was reinvented in 2018 when Sharon began an affair with a much younger Keanu Taylor (Danny Walters). In her second stint, Sharon featured in storylines that included a feud with Phil and Grant's mother Peggy Mitchell (Barbara Windsor); the return of Den, thought long dead, bonding with his wife Chrissie Watts (Tracy-Ann Oberman) until it emerged that she killed Den in retribution for sleeping with Zoe Slater (Michelle Ryan); and a forbidden relationship-turned-marriage with Den's son Dennis Rickman (Nigel Harman), which culminated with his death after the couple ended up feuding with gangster Johnny Allen (Billy Murray).

Since 2012, Sharon's storylines have featured an aborted engagement to Jack Branning (Scott Maslen); battling a painkiller addiction; a reunion and tempestuous marriage to Phil; being attacked in her own bar; meeting her biological father Gavin Sullivan (Paul Nicholas) and her affair with Keanu, popularly dubbed 'Sheanu', sparking the events of Sharon having a late-in-life pregnancy, her split and divorce with Phil after her affair with Keanu is revealed, and giving birth to a son, Albie (who Sharon believes is Keanu's son), on the same night her other son, Dennis Jnr, dies in a boat accident due to Phil, stepson Ben (Max Bowden), and Keanu fighting in the wheelhouse, and her friend Ian Beale (Adam Woodyatt) locking him in a room on the boat as he found out Denny orchestrated the attack on Ian's son Bobby (Clay Milner Russell). Sharon attempts suicide before becoming the landlady of The Queen Vic once again. As part of her revenge plan upon finding out Ian's role in Dennis' death, she marries Ian and attempts to poison him to death but realises she cannot do it and lets him flee. After this, Sharon discovers that she has a half-brother, Zack Hudson (James Farrar); has a fling with Kheerat Panesar (Jaz Deol); and finds out she has a granddaughter, Alyssa. In December 2022, Keanu returns to Walford, and he and Sharon reunite before getting engaged. Sharon deals with Albie's kidnapping unaware that Keanu has orchestrated it, and she also learns that Albie is not Keanu's son after all and that Phil is his real father. The storyline culminates with Keanu's death on Christmas Day 2023 after Sharon jilts him at the altar after learning of his role in Albie's kidnapping and reveals that Keanu is not Albie's father. Keanu almost kills Sharon before her best friend Linda Carter (Kellie Bright) stabs him to defend her during "the Six" storyline. In 2024, Sharon deals with the grief of losing Keanu, which leads to her being in prison; bumping into Chrissie after framing Dean Wicks (Matt Di Angelo) with the help of the Six; developing a relationship with Phil and Grant's relative, Teddy Mitchell (Roland Manookian); and a feud with his ex-wife, Nicola Mitchell (Laura Doddington).

She was named the best EastEnders character of all time by the Daily Mirror in 2020. For her portrayal of Sharon, Dean was awarded the British Soap Award for Outstanding Achievement at the 2022 British Soap Awards.

== Creation ==
=== Background ===
Sharon Watts was one of the original twenty-three characters conceived by the creators of EastEnders, Tony Holland and Julia Smith. She was originally to be named Tracey, and she and her parents were to be the occupants of the soap's local pub, now known as The Queen Vic. Holland, who had worked as a barman in his youth, called upon his own personal experiences to invent the Watts family and the pub they lived in. Holland and Smith had always been critical of the way pubs had been portrayed on television, feeling they lacked vitality and life, so they were determined that their pub and occupants were going to be more "real". The Watts were seen by Holland as integral to the show's success, partly because he had already guessed that the pub was going to be a monstrous battleground where emotions would run high on a regular basis, and also because the occupants would be providing the majority of the drama. Sharon's original character outline, as written by Smith and Holland, appeared in an abridged form in their 1987 book, EastEnders: The Inside Story. In this passage, Sharon is referred to as Tracey and her parents as Jack and Pearl (known now as Den and Angie).

Tracey is at the centre of her parents' dramas. The children of publicans nearly always suffer in one way or another: the fact that your 'home' is always 'open house' to a variety of strangers often produces genuine feelings of anxiety and insecurity. Tracey, being adopted, will be even more sensitive to this lack of permanence. Jack and Pearl do use her as something of a tennis ball in their games of playing things off against each other. Jack tries to buy her affection with gifts. Pearl sees her as something of a rival... Tracey's set on a course which is almost inevitable. Either, a collision, or, full-circle, to the same route as her parents took.

=== Casting ===
Although Sharon was meant to be fourteen, licensing regulations required the cast actress to be a sixteen-year-old who could "play down." Holland and Smith were looking for a "bouncy, attractive, oddly vulnerable young woman" who would come across as slightly more sophisticated than the character of Michelle Fowler, due to be Sharon's closest peer. Out of the various applicants they had seen, they felt only actress Letitia Dean had all of the qualities they were looking for. As the casting directors were only looking for real East End actors, Dean falsely claimed that she was born and raised in Hackney, east London. The lie paid off and she got the part, clinching the deal because of her laugh, which Holland and Smith have described as "the dirtiest in the world!"

Reflecting on her casting, Dean told the magazine, Woman, in 2005: "I was 16 when we started filming EastEnders and my contract was initially for eight weeks—none of us had any idea it would go on for so long. I nearly fainted when I saw Wendy Richard [who played Pauline Fowler] for the first time, because she was a really big name and I was in awe of her. Anita Dobson who played Angie Watts, [Sharon's] mum, took me under her wing." In the early days of EastEnders, it was in Letitia Dean's contract that she was not allowed to lose any weight.

=== Characterisation ===
"The poodle-haired daughter of the late Den and Angie Watts, Sharon was affectionately known as "Princess" by Den. Even though she was adopted she inherited the drama-queen gene from mum, Ange. She was constantly playing her parents off against each other like tennis balls. But she loved them despite living in their drunken war zone. After a troubled adolescence, Sharon emerged as an unbalanced femme fatale with a taste for bullies. She tried both Mitchell brothers and found them wanting. When she returned to the Square after a long absence, however, it was straight back to Phil's bed that she raced."

— Sharon Rickman biography provided by the BBC (2012)

Described by the BBC as "slightly spoilt, over-dramatic, blousy, but ultimately kind-hearted", Sharon has been classified by Rupert Smith, author of EastEnders: 20 Years in Albert Square, as a "drama queen", a "strong passionate [woman] who [goes] to pieces where men are concerned and always [comes] back for more". Early on in her narrative, Sharon was depicted as a mixed-up individual, torn between her warring parents, but spoilt by both; the British press dubbed her "Den's princess", an indication of her spoilt upbringing. Scriptwriter Colin Brake suggested that because of the dysfunctional marriage of her adoptive parents, "Sharon was a fairly troubled teenager. Set apart from the other kids because Den and Angie sent her to private school rather than the local comprehensive, she was a bit of a loner. Spoilt rotten by both her parents, Den's 'little princess' was really a little madam."

As the character progressed into her 20s, she underwent some changes. Colin Brake suggested that, following the discovery of Den's (wrongly identified) body in 1990, it was "time for Den's princess to grow up". In 1993, Letitia Dean discussed the evolution of Sharon from teenager to adult: "She's grown up a lot. Once she got into her stride she got quite strong—not hard, but knew what she wanted." Matthew Bayliss, writing for The Guardian, suggested that Sharon developed into a character that was simultaneously "vamp and victim", comparing her to another popular soap opera character from ITV's Coronation Street, Elsie Tanner (Pat Phoenix).

In 1991, author Hilary Kingsley compared Sharon in adulthood to her mother Angie: "There's a lot of her mother in Sharon Watts. There is the warm sympathy and the barbed tongue for a kick-off. But Sharon is more sensible than Angie, less likely to fly off the beer handle in The Vic." Letitia Dean suggested that Sharon was trying to establish her own personality as landlady of The Vic in 1993, but that she was also taking tips from Angie, whom she "admired for her strength of character." In the 1990s, the producers of EastEnders wanted to take the similarities between Sharon and Angie one step further; they proposed that Sharon would begin drinking gin, the favourite beverage of her alcoholic mother. Dean was opposed to this development and persuaded the producers not to go down this route with Sharon. In 1993, she explained her reasons: "There was one time they wanted [Sharon] to drink gin because that was Angie's tipple, but I thought that was wrong. Her mother was on a dialysis machine which would have put Sharon off gin for life. She would either follow right behind her or she would make her mind up and say no. And since she had seen Angie in such a state, it really put her off." Sharon has been described as a "buxom femme fatale" and one of "life's survivors", who has had "many moments of emotional turmoil". Kingsley suggested that despite this, Sharon is "a sensitive, vulnerable girl who is easily hurt. Even so, that doesn't stop her going after something that she really wants [...] Sharon came through to become a nice girl behind the streetwise image [...] with her blonde hair and bright make-up she adds a cheerful touch to drab Albert Square."

Television critic Matt Bayliss discussed the psychology of Sharon in 2010: "She had a terrible childhood. An alcoholic mother and a father she adored but who treated her mother appallingly. She had a very long subsequent career on the show, falling for the wrong bloke and not realising her own worth. You could see that the way she turned was directly related to her beginnings, to that difficult family situation."

Sharon has topped numerous viewer polls, suggesting she is one of EastEnders' most favoured characters. Critics have praised the character's complex progression from teenager to adult, referencing the investment that viewers hold in Sharon, having watched her grow up on-screen. While Sharon's returns to EastEnders have been welcomed by some critics, others received her comebacks as an indication that the show's writers and producers had run out of original ideas. Letitia Dean has defended the decision to reintroduce Sharon, suggesting that long-running dramas such as EastEnders need "old blood". On 10 April 2019, Dean filmed her 2000th episode as Sharon.

== Development ==
=== Early storylines (1985–1990) ===
An early controversial storyline involving Sharon revolved around her desire to take contraceptive pills to persuade her friend, Kelvin Carpenter (Paul J. Medford) to date her. According to Holland and Smith, this storyline caused tremendous interest in the UK. Holland and Smith have suggested that it was a daring issue to tackle in the 1980s, as it involved a girl under sixteen, and was to be aired at a time when the issue was prominent in British society. Holland and Smith suggested that people took sides with the issue and Sharon's dilemma became a debate used as a teaching method, both in schools and at home. The creators stated that many families admitted that, as a result of Sharon's storyline, they were discussing taboo topics openly in their homes for the first time in years, or ever.

Sharon went on to feature in a storyline about the ups and downs of a pop group called The Banned in 1986. It featured the majority of teenage characters in the soap at the time. The storyline proved to be a successful merchandising tool for the serial, as it spawned two hit singles in the UK charts. One of the songs "Something Outa Nothing", which was performed on-screen in the plot, was released by actors Dean and Medford. The song was a modest success, reaching number 12 in the UK singles chart in November 1986. The storyline was seen as an interesting and major undertaking in the serial, but one that Holland and Smith felt never entirely worked.

In her teenage years, Sharon's main storylines depicted the plight of a young woman struggling to find her identity while growing up in a broken home and coping with her mother's alcoholism and her father's infidelities. Anita Dobson, who played Sharon's mother Angie, discussed Sharon and Angie's relationship, suggesting that Angie was not a good mother: "I think someone handed Sharon over to her one day, and Angie thought of her like this glistening Christmas present. I think she never really thought it through beforehand. I do believe she really wanted a child and she loved Sharon, but eventually found the competition pretty difficult to deal with in regard to Den's attentions. She was pretty rough on Sharon because of her drinking." Sally Vincent, writing for The Guardian, has pontificated about the dynamics of Sharon's relationship with both her parents in 2001. She suggested that viewers felt sorry for Sharon "because not only had her [birth] mother given her away, but her adoptive parents were the legendary Dirty Den and the feckless Angie, erstwhile landlord and lady of The Queen Vic, who were always too busy being dirty and feckless, in our opinion, to take proper care of their little girl. We knew enough about family psychology to know that all those presents they lavished upon her were no substitute for presence. We knew what neglect and emotional absence can do to a growing girl." David Buckingham, in his 1987 book Public Secrets: EastEnders and its audience, analysed the relationship between Sharon and her parents, suggesting that teenage Sharon was suspended between childhood and adulthood. He reflected that Den frequently referred to her as "just a child", but that Sharon herself sought to assert her status as an adult, describing her parents as "immature" or "childish". In character dialogue, Sharon suggested that Den had tried to keep his wife Angie in the role of a baby, but that he himself was a child, stating "I behave more like an adult that you've ever done". During this period, Sharon was shown to question her parents' capability to offer her advice, and both Den and Angie had difficulty refuting her arguments. In one episode Sharon questioned, "How come you two always know what's best for me? You haven't exactly made a good job of your own lives!"

"Poor old Sharon, sometimes she doesn't know which way to turn. She loves both her mum and her dad, but they always seem to be at odds with one another. And being adopted doesn't help much either. Sometimes she feels very insecure—no wonder she goes over the top now and again!"

— Letitia Dean on Sharon's troubled home life (1986)

Sharon was shown to share a particularly close bond with her childhood friend, Michelle, in the serial. Kingsley suggested that Michelle was an "important steadying influence in Sharon's life. The two friends are like sisters and, like sisters, they sometimes fight." Following Den's supposed death in 1989, Sharon and Michelle's friendship was tested by Sharon's discovery that her adored father had slept with her best friend Michelle when she was sixteen and that he was the mystery father of Michelle's daughter, Vicki. Sharon discovered this in a special two-hander episode written by Tony McHale, which aired in April 1989. In the episode, Sharon and Michelle spend an evening together drinking wine and reminiscing. After Sharon confesses to Michelle that, in the absence of both her parents, she now views Michelle and her daughter Vicki as her family, Michelle tells her the secret she has been keeping for four years, that Vicki is Den's daughter. However, Sharon is not comforted by this, feeling "hurt, angry and deceived" by Michelle and her father. Brake surmised that Sharon "leaves the flat wishing that Michelle had never told her. Things would never be quite the same between them." The episode returned to a model established by the first Den-and-Angie solo episode, with revelations and major character changes to an important relationship. Brake suggested that it gave Dean and Susan Tully (Michelle) the chance to demonstrate how much they had grown as actresses during their four years on the programme. Brake also claimed the episode was held in high regard by the show's producers, directors, and writers, describing the actors' performances as "superlative".

=== Relationship with Phil and Grant Mitchell ("Sharongate") ===
The arrival of the Mitchell brothers in 1990 heralded a new era for EastEnders, but also for Sharon. Brothers Phil (Steve McFadden) and Grant Mitchell (Ross Kemp) were introduced by executive producer Michael Ferguson, as he wanted to bring in a couple of young men who would bring an air of danger to the show. Both the Mitchell brothers would prove to be extremely important for Sharon in the following years, most notably when she married one brother, then had an affair with the other.

Sharon and Grant's relationship began in 1990 and by 1991, the couple were installed as the owners of the soap opera's focal establishment, The Queen Victoria public house, Sharon's childhood home. Storyline editor, Andrew Holden, has stated that the decision to promote Sharon from barmaid to landlady of The Vic in 1991 stemmed from discussion about the character's long-term future in EastEnders. It was felt that because Sharon was the daughter of Den and Angie, "it seemed right that she should succeed them, at least for a time, in running The Vic". Holden suggested that the choice to give Sharon The Vic was part of the reason that her predecessor, licensee Eddie Royle (Michael Melia), was killed off in the serial.

19 million viewers tuned in on Boxing Day 1991 to witness Sharon and Grant's surprise Christmas wedding. Their marriage was scripted to be volatile, with Grant resorting to violent displays when things did not go his way and endangering Sharon on numerous occasions due to his criminal dealings. Dean discussed Sharon's attraction to Grant in 1993: "Grant was quite flirtatious with [Sharon] when they first met and he made her feel quite good about herself. He promised to protect her and he promised her the world [...] She wouldn't have gone for Grant if he was just a complete pain in the arse. There are obviously other qualities in him which is why she strives to keep [their relationship] going. There's a lot of reminders — [Grant's] not [Sharon's father] Den, but he's got a lot of characteristics that are pretty similar."

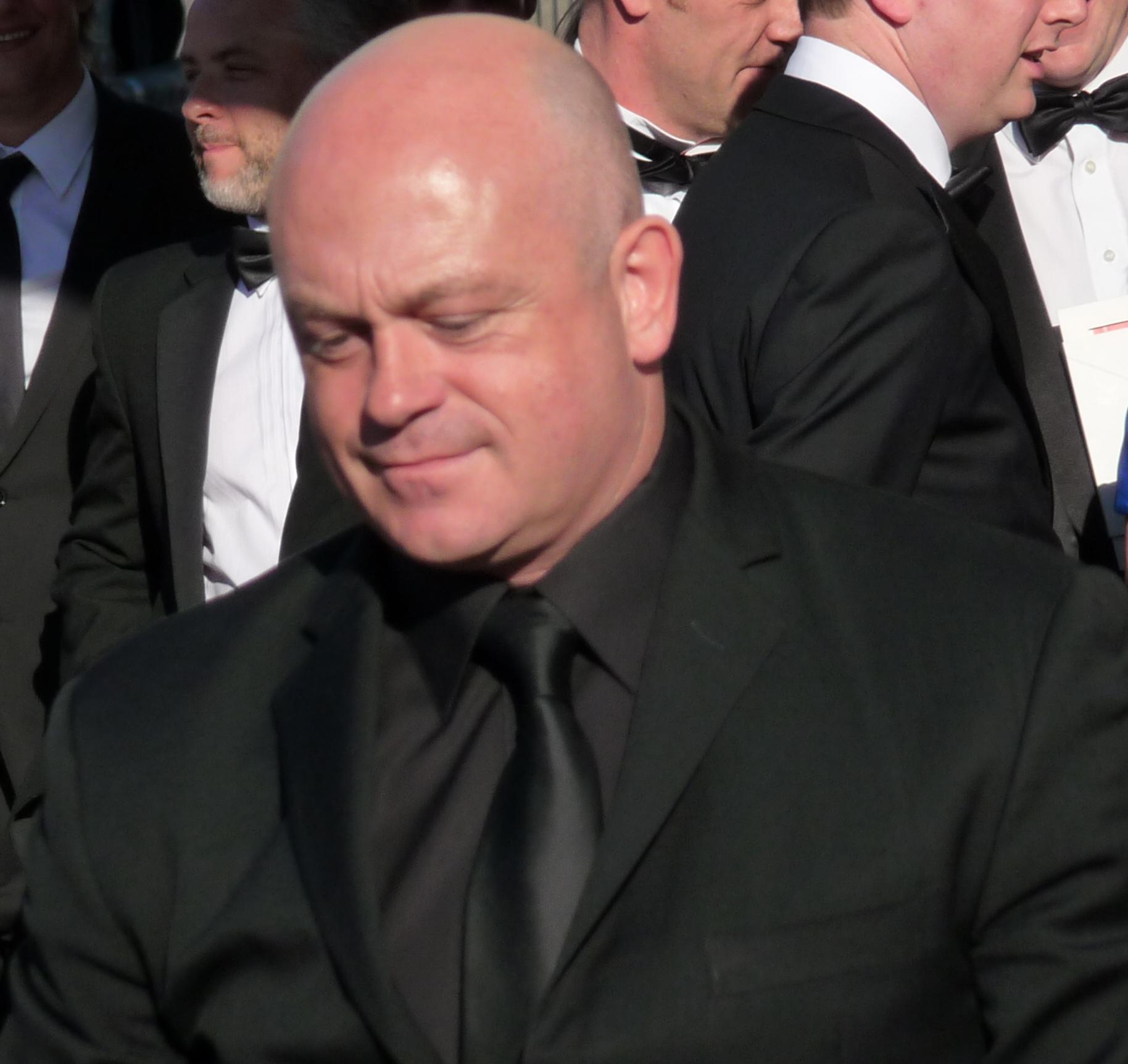
25.3 million viewers watched Grant (Ross Kemp, pictured) discover Sharon's affair with his brother Phil.

Despite the fact that Sharon married Grant in 1991, former EastEnders writer Tony Jordan has revealed in a documentary entitled The Mitchells — The Full Story that the love-triangle storyline between Grant, Sharon and Phil had been planned from the Mitchell brothers' introduction, after the writers came to the realisation that Sharon "was perfect for both of them". The plot has been described by former Executive Producer of EastEnders and BBC's Head of Drama Serials, John Yorke, as a "Tristan and Isolde story". The storyline was spread out for several years and began with Sharon turning to Phil for comfort during a particularly turbulent part of her marriage to Grant. The episode in which Phil betrayed his brother with Sharon occurred in September 1992 in one of the soap's notorious three-handers, an episode featuring only Sharon, Phil and Grant for the duration. Sue Dunderdale directed the episode and the performances of McFadden, Kemp and Dean have been described as memorable and filled with high-tension drama. Discussing Sharon's feelings for Phil, Letitia Dean said: "Phil was always around for Sharon. He seemed to understand her, and Sharon appreciated that. There's always been something between them."

The storyline climaxed in October 1994 with some of EastEnders' most popular and renowned episodes, which have been dubbed "Sharongate". The episodes centred around Grant's discovery that his wife had been having an affair with his brother and they were watched by 25.3 million viewers. On-screen Grant heard Sharon unwittingly confessing to the affair on tape. He reacted by playing it to a pub full of people at Phil's engagement party and then beat his brother unconscious.

The writer of Sharongate, Tony Jordan, has stated that of all the storylines he has penned for the soap, Sharongate is the one he is most proud of. He comments "Three of the strongest characters that have ever been in EastEnders are the Mitchell brothers and Sharon [...] when we actually blew that story it was incredible [...] being able to reach that many people with your work is what makes EastEnders exciting." Reporter for The Guardian, Sally Vincent, has commented on Sharongate's success: "It wasn't so much the guilt-stacked, long-drawn-out business of Sharon 'n' Phil's helpless lust for each other—all that unseemly face-sucking while her hubby/his brother, the ape-like Grant, languished in gaol for trying to set fire to everyone—that broke the ratings record, nor was it the ingenious ruse of using the [DJ's tape deck] to broadcast Sharon's poignant little confession to the entire clientele of Walford's Queen Vic [pub]. It was the fact that we'd all watched Sharon grow up. We knew that she was a nice little person, vulnerable, brave, sweet-natured and kind to the dog. We were sorry for her [...] Neither of those Mitchells deserved her, so when one punched the other and half-killed him for tampering with his lady-wife, we didn't much care. We were sorry to see [Sharon] go."

Sharongate has proven to be a popular storyline with viewers. In 2001 it was voted the second "Best Ever Soap Moment" in an ITV televised poll, and it was voted the sixth top soap opera moment of all time in a poll of 17,000 people for What's on TV magazine in 2003. In 2010, Michael Hogan from The Telegraph ranked it the sixth of the top ten "unforgettable moments" of EastEnders. In a 2012 nationwide poll of 1,000 people published in Inside Soap, 'Sharongate' was voted as the greatest soap opera moment of the past 20 years.

=== Departure (1995) ===
Dean decided to quit the role of Sharon in 1995, having played the character for over a decade. Dean was not the only original cast member to announce their departure that year; Tully (Michelle) and Bill Treacher (Arthur Fowler) also quit, leaving just Richard (Pauline), Adam Woodyatt (Ian Beale), and Gillian Taylforth (Kathy Beale) as the only original cast remaining at that time. Dean, who was aged 26 at the time, has since reflected on her decision to leave, suggesting she went through an identity crisis when she found herself thinking "who am I? Am I Sharon Watts or am I an actress?". Sally Vincent, interviewing Dean for The Guardian, surmised: "it nagged away at [Dean] for ages until she thought, hell, she owed it to herself, and started telling the producers she'd been thinking about trying new things. In those days, they didn't let you off for the odd panto or anything. It was full-time work. She remembers being dithery and apologetic about it, but her feet were itchy and, though she never really wanted to close the door behind her, she talked about going until one day, much to her consternation, [the producers] said all right then, off you go, lots of luck. They didn't ask her to reconsider, so she thought, 'Ooooh, charmin', and off she went." Dean added, "I felt the need to spread my wings and try my hand at other things. I didn't want to feel there were parts out there I hadn't had a chance to play. When I left I felt this mixture of excitement and fear. I went on the last walk with Susan Tully [who played Michelle Fowler] around the Square, talking quietly, and I felt quite sad. But at the same time it felt like the right thing to do."

Sharon's exit on 6 July 1995 surrounded the continual fall-out from the Sharongate saga. 18 million viewers saw Grant bully Sharon into a divorce in the Christmas 1994 episodes; after a brief hiatus, she returned in 1995 for several months to gain revenge on Grant. The build-up for revenge saw Sharon coaxing Grant into making a public plea for marital reconciliation. However, as Thomas Sutcliffe writing for The Independent surmised, "In the end, Sharon recoiled from the full horror of public humiliation in the Queen Vic and conducted a minor-key revenge on the pavement outside. For a while, there seemed a good chance that she was going to leave the series in an ambulance, but Grant kept his temper, so she simply climbed into a black cab, departing not with a bang but a whimper."

=== Reintroduction (2001) ===
The character was reintroduced to the show in 2001 by then producer John Yorke, almost six years after her initial departure. Discussing Yorke's decision to reintroduce the character, a BBC spokesperson said, "It's the producer's job to decide how the storylines are going to go, and he decided to bring Sharon back. And Letitia said she would love to come back." The producer's decision to bring Sharon back reportedly shocked Dean, as she believed the time for a return had passed, particularly as Kemp had just left the series. She commented in a 1999 interview, "I can't see how the storyline would work. There's only so much love a girl can have for the Queen Vic." However, when she saw the scripts for Sharon's return, she was convinced.

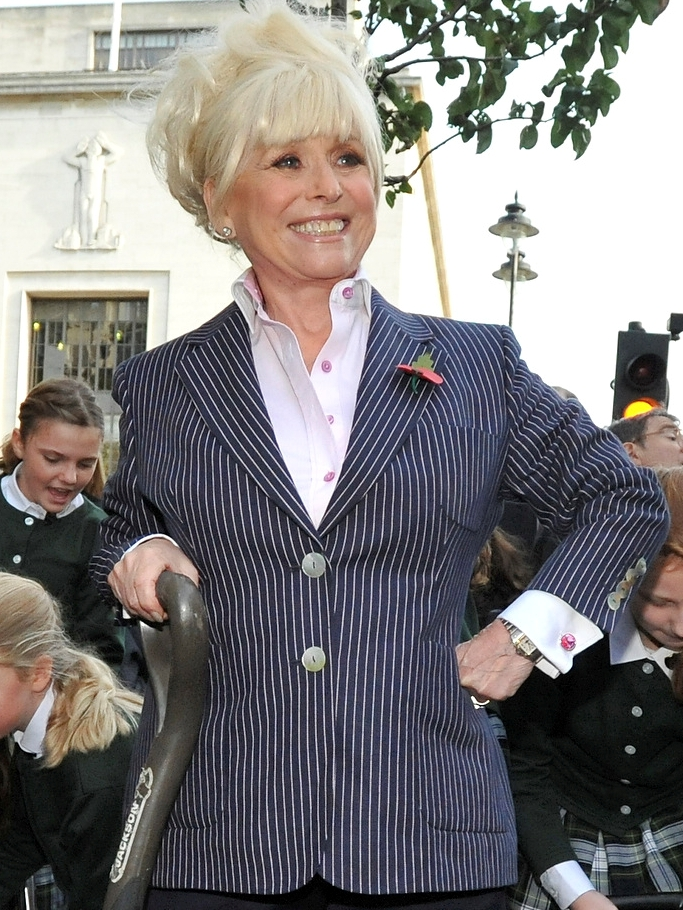
Grant and Phil's mother, Peggy Mitchell, played by Barbara Windsor (pictured), was featured prominently in Sharon's return storyline in May 2001, when she unwittingly sold The Queen Vic public house to her.

Dean suggested that Sharon, who had passed 30 years of age on her return to the serial, wanted to get back to her roots and rediscover herself in Walford. Discussing her comeback, Dean said, "It's a wonderful opportunity to breathe life into Sharon again. I found out at Christmas [2000], so it was a fantastic present. Sharon has a great story to tell, having been away for so long. She has some unfinished business to sort out—and has some demons to face as well. I've always held Sharon's character close to my heart. I always said: 'Never say never'. There's nothing worse than making a huge statement about never doing it again, and then going back [...] It was very exciting to be working with new cast members. But seeing members of the cast who I grew up with like Adam Woodyatt, Todd Carty, Wendy Richard and Steve McFadden was just fantastic. It gave me some much-needed confidence and reassurance, knowing that I'd have that support." Sharon's return episodes, which aired in May 2001, saw her shocking the Mitchell family by revealing herself as the anonymous buyer of her childhood home (the Vic pub). During the years since Sharon's departure, the Queen Vic had remained in the Mitchells' ownership until Grant's mother Peggy Mitchell (Barbara Windsor) was forced to sell it. Discussing Sharon's return scenes, Dean said, "Her appearance in the Vic is fabulous, and provokes some great reactions. Peggy is astonished, speechless and horrified all rolled into one. It's landladies and their handbags at dawn." Sharon's return was voted one of the top 100 TV moments of 2001 in a Channel 4 poll, and was chosen as the favourite soap comeback by almost one-third of viewers.

The return arc saw Sharon reuniting with her former lover, Phil. Discussing this, Dean said, "[Sharon's] tougher and seems to know what she wants. Seeing Phil throws up vivid memories and strong feelings for Sharon. She's always had a deep affection for him". She added that because Sharon had grown and gained strength and independence while being in America, "she can handle pretty much anything the Mitchells can throw at her". Their reunion lasted until December 2001, when various secrets, including Sharon's confession that she believed she was infertile after aborting Grant's baby, ended their romance.

=== Relationship with Tom Banks ===
In 2002, executive producer John Yorke introduced the character of Tom Banks (Colm Ó Maonlaí) as a love interest for Sharon. A love triangle storyline featured initially as Tom battled for Sharon's affections with her former lover Phil. In the storyline, Tom was shown to be keeping secrets from Sharon regarding his collapsed marriage, secrets that were unveiled by Phil; when Sharon confronted Tom, he admitted that he was still married, although he and his wife had split up.

In July 2002, following the introduction of a new executive producer, Louise Berridge, it was announced that Tom was being written out of EastEnders. A spokesperson denied that the actor had been fired, commenting, "He was brought in to play out a specific storyline" and that he was due to "go out with a bang". According to The Mirror, EastEnders' bosses decided that there was nowhere else to go with the character, that they could not work out how to develop him and that he had fulfilled a specific role. Part of Tom's exit storyline saw the character discovering that he had an inoperable brain tumour. Despite the initial upset this caused to his relationship with Sharon, the couple resolved to stay together and marry after Sharon proposed. Discussing Sharon's impromptu proposal, a BBC spokesperson said, "The two of them are messing one day and they decide to swap roles. Tom is supposed to do the washing and cleaning and Sharon takes on the role of a man. It is all supposed to be a joke but Sharon takes it to heart and shocks Tom when she arrives home with a ring and asks for his hand in marriage." However, in a plot twist, Tom was not killed off by the tumour; he instead died in a fire, airing in an episode that paid homage to Halloween, in October 2002. His death coincided with the exit of another character, Trevor Morgan (Alex Ferns). In the episode, Tom rushes into a house fire to save Trevor who is holding his baby and his wife Little Mo Mitchell (Kacey Ainsworth) hostage, but despite rescuing Mo and the baby, he and Trevor both die in an explosion.

=== Return of Den Watts ===
In 2003, Berridge negotiated for Leslie Grantham to reprise the role of Sharon's father Den, 14 years after his last appearance. Part of her motive for doing so was to bring Sharon, whom she described as one of her favourite characters, "right back where she belonged, at the very heart of the show." The character Den had supposedly been killed in 1989 and a body found the following year had been identified as his, so the programme-makers needed to make certain that his return could be plausibly explained. A research team was employed to scour over past episodes of EastEnders' to make certain that his return storyline would not have been going against anything that had been shown prior, or that could not have been "faked". In an interview with Walford Web, Berridge discussed how her researchers discovered that there were inconsistencies in the episodes that aired during 1989 and 1990, that could account for Den's death being staged. She commented, "A great deal was made in the show of Den's [signet] ring turning up [as proof that he died]—but if you watch the episode of the shooting you'll see he isn't even wearing it at the time of his supposed death. So how did it get in the canal?". Berridge's writers concocted a story whereby the body that was recovered in 1990 was misidentified as Den's; Den fled to Spain to escape the mobsters and allowed his family to believe he was dead until he was traced in 2003.

Den's return aired in September 2003, with Den walking into Sharon's club "Angie's Den" (named after her parents) and uttering the greeting "Hello princess" to his daughter. Scriptwriter Sarah Phelps, who penned Den's return, has discussed the episodes in the televised documentary EastEnders Revealed: Dirty Den Returns: "It all had to kick off in Angie's Den because this is the thing that Sharon has built [in] memory of her parents [...] the way she's worshipped them in their death in a way that she couldn't deal with them when they were alive [...] there's a lot of really confused and emotional stuff [for Sharon]". Dean has discussed Sharon's reaction to Den's comeback: "Sharon put her father on such a pedestal, when she found out that he had been alive for all those years and never contacted her — once — it absolutely devastated her, it rocked her world [...] She couldn't believe that he would be so selfish because she was his princess." Grantham suggested that the one person Den loved more than himself was Sharon and that she was the reason he came back to Walford after 14 years. Part of Den's return episodes featured a 20-page scene between Sharon and Den, played out in their former home, The Queen Vic. The director required that this scene be filmed all at once, which Dean has described as daunting but exciting. She believed that the long scene helped build realistic tension greatly because both she and Grantham were so nervous about working together again.

Further discussing Sharon's ambivalent reaction to her father's return Dean said, "Sharon is absolutely dumbstruck at seeing her father again. It's like seeing a ghost and she's completely shocked. To see him after all this time when she had accepted his death and got on with her life, is too much for her. Sharon has been through so much in the past 14 years without Den and has had to cope on her own. Although she's pleased to see him, he knows nothing of the life she's had in his absence—he hasn't been there for all the times she's been hurt, like when she was caring for [her dying mother] Angie, or when her fiancé Tom died. She's developed as a woman, and for her, their relationship ended when he 'died' while she was still a teenager. Everything has been turned upside down for her. She's feeling angry and resentful [towards] Den at the moment, but that's only because she loved him so much. He's going to have to tread so carefully with her—he's got some real making up to do in order to enable Sharon to trust him again." Despite initial animosity and hurt, Sharon eventually welcomes Den back into her life and allows him to return to live with her, resuming head of the Watts dynasty.

=== Relationship with Dennis Rickman ("Shannis") ===
As a precursor to Den's return and as part of Berridge's plan to rebuild the Watts family, Den's estranged son Dennis Rickman (Nigel Harman) was introduced to EastEnders earlier in 2003. A "forbidden love" storyline was built into Sharon's narrative, when she embarked on a relationship with Dennis despite him being the son of her adoptive father. Scenes in which Sharon and Dennis succumb to their lust for each other had to be re-edited as the programme's producers deemed them too raunchy to be shown before the 9pm watershed on BBC1. Discussing the scenes, Harman said, "My character Dennis has been through most of the ladies on the square. But his latest encounter with Sharon is something else. There's lots of banging around as we are ripping each other's clothes off while staggering round the flat. There's also quite a lot of flesh in the post-coital scene! It might shock a few people as she's [Dennis's] sister—not blood sister, though. Bosses had to tone it down and cut a couple of passionate embraces out." According to Harman, Dennis's feelings for Sharon transcended anything Dennis had felt for women before her.

Den's opposition to his children's on/off romance was a reoccurring theme in the serial throughout 2004. The plot was the focus of the Christmas Day 2004 episodes when Dennis and Sharon announce they have reunited despite Dennis being in a simultaneous relationship with Zoe Slater (Michelle Ryan). The fall-out, which sees Den persuading Zoe to tell Dennis she is expecting his baby, results in Sharon leaving Dennis. Discussing the storyline, Ryan said, "Den forces her to say that she's pregnant because he knows Dennis won't run away with Sharon if he thinks there's a baby on the way. Den completely manipulates the whole thing and Zoe finds herself trapped in the lie because she can't seek advice from anyone. She didn't dream up this silly situation—it was Den who told her to fabricate the story to save their relationship. It was his idea all along. Zoe still wants Dennis, even if he is in love with Sharon. She's obsessed with him and can't let go. She just wants to salvage the relationship and hasn't even thought about putting the past behind them. Dennis is still not totally convinced, but he always swore he would never leave a child without a dad so he hopes that it will work for them in the future." Writing for The Guardian, Owen Gibson suggested that with the Christmas Day 2004 episodes EastEnders were attempting to reprise the trick that garnered the show its biggest ever audience in 1986 of 30.6 million, by gathering the Watts family together for a festive altercation. 12.3 million people tuned in to watch Sharon leave Walford without Dennis in the aftermath; it was the highest viewed television programme of the day.

Dennis and Sharon marry

Dennis and Sharon eventually returned to the serial as a couple in the summer of 2005 having reunited off-screen, neither aware that Den has been murdered by his scorned second wife Chrissie Watts (Tracy-Ann Oberman) in their absence. Den's murder storyline aired to celebrate EastEnders' 20th anniversary plot in February 2005 and featured Sharon discovering the truth about Den's duplicity; it attracted 14 million viewers. Prominent in Sharon and Dennis's return arc was their marriage and involvement in uncovering Chrissie as Den's killer after Sam Mitchell (Kim Medcalf) was originally charged with the murder. The Rickmans' wedding was watched by over 10 million viewers, and the nuptials were scripted to coincide with the discovery of Den's body, which had been buried in the Vic's cellar.

=== Departure (2006): Dennis's murder ===
In August 2005, the BBC announced that both Dean and Harman were quitting their roles as Sharon and Dennis, with both due to film their final scenes for a New Year's departure. While Harman's exit was reported as permanent, Dean's was reported as an "extended break", with the suggestion being that she would be returning to the soap opera at some unspecified stage. Discussing the departure, Harman said, "Sharon and Dennis have had such a great run, but what would you do with them next? I could pretty much guarantee we've already done it. It was something that was talked about over a period of time between myself and the producers." Harman added, "I think it would be weird to have one there without the other and we've taken it as far as we can go. I think [the exit storyline will] be quite juicy but I'm waiting to find out. I'd like it to be a happy storyline, like Sharon and Dennis going off around the world. Although obviously, she'll have to come back on her own going, 'What a [bastard]'."

Despite Sharon discovering that she was pregnant with Dennis's child on Christmas Day 2005, the Rickman's were not given a happy ending. Writers made the decision to kill Dennis in the New Year's Eve episode of 2005. In the episode Dennis was fatally stabbed on the Albert Square pavement following a violent altercation with gangster Johnny Allen (Billy Murray), having been informed by Phil that Johnny had throttled Sharon. The aftermath saw Sharon struggling with her grief and the realisation that she would be bringing her baby up fatherless. Discussing Sharon's grief at Dennis's funeral, Letitia Dean told Inside Soap in 2006 "It's an incredibly traumatic day for Sharon, she's lost her soulmate. It's especially devastating because she's pregnant, which, as far as she and Dennis were concerned, was a miracle. It's such a bittersweet time. The pain is overwhelming when Sharon sees her husband's coffin [...] Sharon knows that she has to carry on for the baby's sake—it's a part of Dennis she'll have forever, and she takes great comfort in that. As far as Johnny's concerned, though, she wants to see justice done—a job she entrusts to Phil. However, all he's interested in is getting Sharon away from Walford. He's genuinely worried for her welfare, but he's also petrified she'll discover his role in Dennis's death." In the storyline, Phil persuades Sharon to leave Walford to stay in America, in an episode which aired in January 2006.

Despite initial reports suggesting that Dean would only be taking a break from EastEnders and subsequent rumours indicating that Sharon would return for the birth of her child later in 2006, it was announced in June 2006 that there were no immediate plans for Sharon to return but that the birth of her baby would be announced on-screen later that year.

=== Reintroduction (2012) ===
On 2 February 2012, it was announced that Dean would reprise the role of Sharon after more than six years away. Dean said "I am really looking forward to being part of the EastEnders team again, as it has always been very close to my heart. I cannot wait to work with my old colleagues and see what is in store for Sharon." Executive producer Bryan Kirkwood said he was thrilled that Dean was returning and he could not wait to see Sharon on screen later in the year. Kirkwood had previously told a columnist for Inside Soap that in Sharon's absence, Ronnie Mitchell (Samantha Womack) had filled the role of the "quivery lipped blonde" female. Tabloid newspapers claimed Sharon was returning to "fill the gap" left behind by Jessie Wallace's character, Kat Slater, who at the time was on a hiatus. However, an EastEnders' spokesperson said "There is no link between Letitia's return to EastEnders and Jessie not being around at the moment. We have been working on plans to bring Sharon back for quite some time." They added viewers could look forward to seeing both characters on screen together later in the year.

Dean returned to filming on 6 June 2012. Sharon's return storyline saw her fiancé John (Jesse Birdsall) kidnap her son Dennis Rickman Jnr (Harry Hickles) following a "furious bust up". Sharon enlisted the help former lover Phil to retrieve her son. Sharon returned to EastEnders on 13 August 2012. Sharon's return storyline was marked with seven episodes being broadcast over a period of a week (the typical weekly output at this time was four) and it coincided with EastEnders' return to BBC1 following its brief departure to the network's sister channel BBC Two to allow for coverage of the 2012 Olympic Games in London. To promote the character's return, the BBC began airing a trailer across its network's channels during July and August 2012. The trailer showed Albert Square and its residents being blown away by "Hurricane Sharon", who floated down from the sky wearing a wedding dress to the soundtrack of "Gimme Shelter" by the Rolling Stones.

Dean described Sharon as a lost soul upon her return: "she's totally lost. She doesn't know who she is, where she's going. There's something that comes out later, that's happened to her in the States and stuff like that. But she's a lost soul, and this is home again. There's no place like home, so she finds herself back there again."

Sharon's return in 2012 saw her battling with an addiction to painkillers. Sharon secretly visits an addiction support group but continues to use the painkillers whenever things became difficult in her personal circumstances. The problem culminates in 2013 when Sharon is asked to look after Phil's baby granddaughter Lexi Pearce (Dotti-Beau Cotterill), and is found unconscious by Lexi's mother Lola Pearce (Danielle Harold) after taking painkillers. Discussing the storyline, Dean said, "Filming the scene where she collapses and Lola finds her was really difficult because it's so sad. Sharon thinks she is coping but she evidently isn't. She is on such a downward spiral. She can stop using the pills for periods of time, but then something happens and it all gets too much for her. That is the trouble when people rely on things like prescription medication — they'll go to any lengths to get what they want." Dean indicated that she was "fascinated" by this plot development given Sharon's history with her mother Angie's addiction to alcohol during the 1980s. Dean suggested that Sharon was always "disgusted" by her mother's addiction to the extent that she would not even smoke cigarettes, "so the fact that she's got this far in life and has now succumbed to an addiction is fascinating."

=== Reunion with Phil Mitchell ===
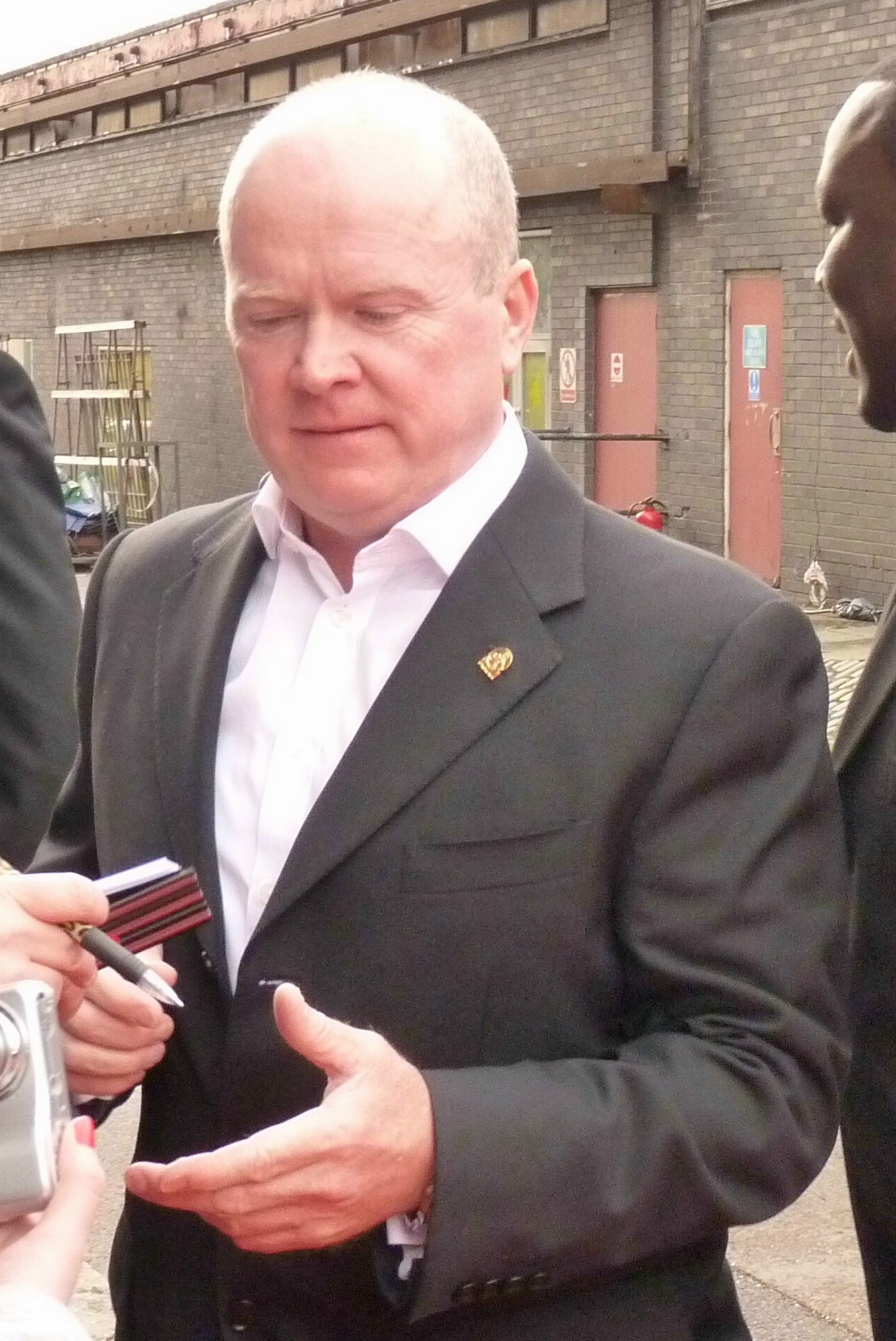
Sharon was reunited romantically with Phil Mitchell (Steve McFadden seen above) for a third time following her return in 2012.

Although paired romantically with Jack Branning (Scott Maslen) in 2012, Sharon's romantic history with Phil was continuously revisited: firstly when Phil and Jack competed for Sharon's hand in marriage, and secondly when Sharon kissed Phil despite having chosen to marry Jack. However, it was not until late 2013 when scriptwriters reunited Phil and Sharon legitimately, Sharon having weathered being jilted by Jack at their wedding earlier that year.

Dean suggested in 2012 that "Sharon has always had a great fondness for Phil and he has always been there for her. She is very comfortable around him and they have a lot of history between them." Although Dean has speculated that Sharon and Phil are not right for each other, she acknowledged the connection between the characters, suggesting they "know each other inside and out". She added, "It was real lust between them back in the day. I don't think she's ever lost that feeling for him and vice versa [...] She likes to think there are no surprises with him but he's also got that edge to him that she's always liked as well. There's a familiarity there and he will help her to feel more settled in life [...] There's always been a deep affection. I think she did love him greatly but when they first got together, when she was married to his brother Grant, that love was never allowed to blossom really. There have always been underlying feelings for him. This is the first time they can really be together properly and honestly and she wants him warts and all [...] She feels safe with Phil, she feels protected and she always has with him, even when they were just friends she always knew he'd be there for her."

As part of executive producer Dominic Treadwell-Collins' attempt to modernise EastEnders and to reflect trendy areas in east London like Shoreditch, Sharon and Phil were given a new wine bar in the soap to front in 2014. Treadwell-Collins said to the Radio Times: "It should feel more like London. It's been frozen in aspic for too long. Sharon said recently that she's looking to be a landlady. As a result, you'll see the edges of Shoreditch creeping into EastEnders. It's got to reflect the modern world." Treadwell-Collins stated that his aim was not to be too pretentious or "try-hard cool" with Sharon's new bar, but for the bar to be somewhere where viewers would want to visit and something for them to laugh at.

The reunion storyline leads to increased animosity between Sharon and "her nemesis" Shirley Carter (Linda Henry), Phil's ex-girlfriend who still harboured feelings for him. According to Dean, "Sharon is very astute and she knows that deep down for Phil, Shirley meant something to him. I doubt she knows too much about it, I don't think she wants to know too much about it, but I definitely think she's wary about it [...] She thinks that Shirley is just quite bitter and jealous of her relationship with Phil and that Shirley needs to move on. Sharon has always been the love of Phil's life so Shirley needs to get over it. That's the undertone." Sharon and Shirley's rivalry was satirised in a BBC trailer which aired to coincide with the 2014 FIFA World Cup. In the trailer, Sharon and Shirley compete with each other by showing off their football skills.

=== Affair with Keanu Taylor ("Sheanu") ===
In July 2018, it was revealed that Sharon would become involved in an affair with Phil's young employee Keanu Taylor (Danny Walters). The affair began in August after Phil's neglect of Sharon and he went to Spain on business for a number of months. The affair continued until November when Phil returned home and Sharon later went to Australia to get Keanu out of her system. The story was later developed when Keanu slept with and developed a relationship with Sharon's stepdaughter Louise Mitchell (Tilly Keeper) whilst she was away, and later returned to find them kissing. Despite the affair ending, it was later expanded when both Louise got pregnant by him and later seemingly Sharon too when they slept together again when Keanu believed Louise had aborted his baby. During the course of 2019, it became a prominent storyline, with nods to "Sharongate". The couple became referred to as "Sheanu" by fans and critics.

In September 2019, it was reported that Sharon would be involved in a major car stunt with Mel Owen (Tamzin Outhwaite). These scenes aired in November, when Sharon indirectly caused Mel to crash after a feud with her after she blackmails her when she finds out about the affair. In October 2019, it was revealed that the paternity test and affair would come out to Phil around Christmas Day, almost a year and half after the storyline started. In February 2020, Sharon gave birth to Keanu's son, Albie Watts. In November 2023, it was revealed that Albie was not Keanu's son, and his actual father was Phil.

=== Breaks (2024–2026) ===
In 2024, Dean took a break from the show, while Sharon exited on 9 January and returned on 1 April. The following year, she took another break, with Sharon departing on 8 April and returning on 22 September. Less than a month later, Dean took leave again, and Sharon exited on 16 October. Dean resumed the role in 2026, with scenes concerning Sharon's return airing on 26 May.

== Storylines ==
=== 1985–1995 ===
Adopted at the age of three by Den (Leslie Grantham) and Angie Watts (Anita Dobson), Sharon is raised at The Queen Victoria public house in Albert Square, Walford, where her adoptive parents are landlords. Sharon and her best friend, Michelle Fowler (Susan Tully), compete for the affections of Kelvin Carpenter (Paul J. Medford). This leads to Sharon wanting to go on the pill, which shocks Angie. However, after Angie gets advice from Pauline Fowler (Wendy Richard) and Dr. Harold Legg (Leonard Fenton), Sharon and Angie talk about it and Sharon decides to wait. Her teenage romance with Ian Beale (Adam Woodyatt) ends when Sharon realises she prefers a more experienced man. She then begins a relationship with Simon Wicks (Nick Berry), who ends the relationship when she refuses to have sex (although she eventually loses her virginity to him when she is 18). She seeks refuge from her turbulent home life with church curate, Duncan Boyd (David Gillespie). They plan to marry but Duncan bores Sharon and she ends the engagement. Sharon is torn between her conflicting parents until their marriage deteriorates and, Angie leaves Walford in the spring in 1988. When Den gets involved in gangland crime, he is shot in February 1989 and is believed to be dead, although a search of the canal where he was last seen fails to uncover anything. Shortly afterwards, Michelle confesses to Sharon that her young daughter Vicki Fowler (Samantha Leigh Martin) is Sharon's half-sister, Den having got Michelle pregnant at 16, and Sharon is angry and hurt at Michelle.

In the spring of 1990, Sharon discovers Den's signet ring on a market stall. With Den's body missing, Sharon convinces the police to search the canal again. She is devastated when a body is found and believed to be Den's. Sharon resumes her relationship with Simon, but the relationship ends when Simon's affair with Cindy Beale (Michelle Collins) is revealed. Hurt and missing her parents, Sharon tracks down her birth mother, Carol Hanley (Sheila White). They meet several times until Carol confesses she has no maternal feelings for Sharon.

Sharon remains at The Queen Vic, working as a barmaid. She starts dating Grant Mitchell (Ross Kemp). A controlling boyfriend, Grant assaults Sharon's boss, Eddie Royle (Michael Melia), when he tries to kiss her. Although Sharon is perturbed by this, she discovers that Grant's violent behaviour results from traumatic experiences as a paratrooper in the Falklands War, and agrees to marry him. Eddie does not approve of their relationship and fires Sharon so she takes him to an industrial tribunal for unfair dismissal. She wins but Eddie refuses to reinstate her. Sharon tells Grant she will only marry him if he gets her tenancy back at The Queen Vic. Grant makes this happen and Sharon becomes the new licensee after Eddie is murdered by Nick Cotton (John Altman). Sharon marries Grant on Christmas Day 1991, but their marriage is plagued with arguments and he ends up hitting her on several occasions.

While Grant wants to start a family, Sharon prefers to concentrate on making The Queen Vic a successful business. When Grant discovers she is taking the contraceptive pill, he smashes up the pub and disappears, leaving Sharon to be comforted by his brother, Phil Mitchell (Steve McFadden). Sharon has sex with Phil but chooses to stay with Grant. However, the Mitchells' marriage deteriorates further when Grant torches The Queen Vic in an insurance scam, almost killing Sharon and her dog, Roly, who are trapped inside. An acrimonious split ensues with Grant hitting Sharon during a power struggle over management of the pub. Michelle calls the police during one of Grant's outbursts and he is imprisoned for assaulting them. While he is in prison, Sharon and Phil reunite and secretly live together as a couple. When Grant is released, Sharon takes him back.

Phil gets engaged to Kathy Beale (Gillian Taylforth). Realising she still has feelings for Phil, Sharon tries to seduce him. Phil kisses her in a moment of passion that he immediately regrets, so Sharon convinces herself she is happy with Grant and considers having children with him. Simultaneously, Michelle's boyfriend, Geoff Barnes (David Roper), wants to interview Sharon for a book he is writing. Michelle conducts a recorded interview but then forgets to turn off the recorder at the end and discusses Sharon's affair with Phil. Grant finds the tape and, on the night of Phil and Kathy's engagement party, he plays it to a packed pub. He then attacks Phil and bullies and humiliates Sharon into agreeing to a divorce. She goes to stay with Angie in America but returns to hostility from the Mitchells. She is unperturbed and wins back the respect of Grant who realises that he still loves her. Wanting revenge for her mistreatment, she leads Grant on whilst planning to humiliate him publicly. They have sex and Sharon lets Grant think a public marriage proposal will seal their reunion. Grant attempts this on The Queen Vic's quiz night; Sharon is all set to turn him down but suddenly cannot go through with it and stops him from proposing. She confesses that she still loves him, then returns to America alone. She does not return to Walford for six years.

=== 2001–2006 ===
Phil and Grant's mother, Peggy Mitchell (Barbara Windsor), sells The Queen Vic in May 2001, and is furious to discover that Sharon is the new owner. Sharon's boyfriend, Ross Fletcher (Ché Walker), joins her claiming that he has left his wife but Sharon discovers he is lying and ends the relationship and rekindles her romance with Phil. Sharon's bombshell that she is infertile following an abortion upsets Phil, and knowing that Phil wouldn't be happy without children of his own, they consider adoption before Peggy expresses her horror that Phil could take on "another man's mistake". Sharon ends the relationship in December 2001 and returns to the States to be with her mother. Angie dies from cirrhosis soon afterwards, and Sharon returns to Walford to bury her mother. This affects her badly and soon she starts dating an old school friend, Tom Banks (Colm Ó Maonlaí). The relationship survives Tom's unstable wife, Sadie (Isobel Middleton) who is sectioned after holding Sharon hostage and threatening suicide unless Tom takes her back. Sharon later sells her share of The Queen Vic back to the Mitchells and purchases a nightclub with Tom, naming it "Angie's Den". When Tom is diagnosed with a terminal brain tumour, Sharon stands by him and they plan to travel after getting married. On the night of their engagement party, however, Tom discovers a fire at the house of fellow neighbours Little Mo Morgan (Kacey Ainsworth) and her abusive husband, Trevor (Alex Ferns); after helping Little Mo escape the fire with Trevor's son, Sean Andrews (Oliver Bradley), Tom attempts to rescue Trevor – but the pair are killed when the fire explodes. A devastated Sharon reels over Tom's death and later organises his funeral.

In early 2003, Den's daughter, Vicki (now played by Scarlett Alice Johnson), returns to Walford. She and Sharon soon discover that they have a brother – Dennis Rickman (Nigel Harman) – who was the product of one of Den's affairs 30 years earlier with a woman named Paula. Dennis has links to the same criminal organisation as Den and he discovers that Den is alive and living in Spain, and he tells Sharon of this revelation but she refuses to believe him. Dennis and Sharon fall in love, but their romance is halted by Den's return. He had survived the shooting in 1989, fleeing to Spain and starting a new life there. The body found in the canal was actually that of a gangland boss who had been murdered as punishment for failing to kill Den.

After years of feeling guilty about disowning Den before his "death", Sharon is thrilled to see him but furious about the unnecessary hurt he caused – although he informs her that he had to disappear and fake his own death in order to protect his family as well as himself. Den, however, is disgusted to discover Sharon and Dennis's romantic relationship and blackmails Dennis into ending it. Dennis begrudgingly dates Zoe Slater (Michelle Ryan), but just before Christmas 2004, he secretly reunites with Sharon. Zoe's relative, Stacey Slater (Lacey Turner), spots them getting out of a cab, holding hands and kissing. Stacey tells Zoe but Zoe does not believe her because she thinks Stacey is jealous and an argument ensues. Sharon and Dennis announce their plan to move to America on Christmas Day, only for Zoe to jeopardise this by announcing to the family that she is pregnant – she was in fact faking a pregnancy on the advice of Den, who was determined to split up Sharon and Dennis. Sharon refuses to let Dennis abandon his child and chooses to leave Walford.

She returns briefly in February 2005 when summoned by Den's wife, Chrissie Watts (Tracy-Ann Oberman), with the news that Den is ill. Chrissie, Zoe, and Sam Mitchell (Kim Medcalf) confront Den about various deceitful deeds, including Zoe's fake pregnancy and his affairs – which Sharon overhears, just as Chrissie had planned. Disgusted, Sharon leaves, disowning Den as he had split her from Dennis and used her infertility against her.

In a fit of rage, Den attacks Chrissie but is defended by Zoe who hits him over the head with an iron doorstop. Thinking Den to be dead, Chrissie mocks him but as soon as Den returns to consciousness, he grabs her by the leg but Chrissie grabs a bar stool and hits him again over the head, killing him. Aided by Zoe and Sam, Chrissie buries Den in The Queen Vic's cellar to cover up the murder.

Dennis soon reunites with Sharon in America and they return to Walford in June 2005 in search of Den, but Chrissie claims he has left with another woman. Zoe leaves for Ibiza, and Sharon and Dennis marry, but during their reception, Sam is arrested for digging up Den's body to incriminate Chrissie; however, Sam is charged with Den's murder after Stacey gives the police a false alibi for Zoe and Chrissie. Phil and Grant both return to Walford weeks later to convince Sharon of Chrissie's guilt, and Sharon and Grant resolve their past grievances, as do Dennis and Phil, and the four work together with Peggy to bring Chrissie to justice. Sharon and the Mitchells try to persuade Stacey to drop her alibi, so Sam can be released, but to no avail following an angry confrontation with Zoe's mother, Kat Moon (Jessie Wallace), who is trying to protect her daughter from prosecution. Eventually, Phil and Grant manage to extract a tape of Chrissie confessing to Den's murder – thus proving her guilt to the police. Chrissie is then arrested and sentenced to life imprisonment after admitting that she had killed Den.

On Christmas Day 2005, Sharon is stunned to discover she is pregnant, and she and Dennis celebrate the potential of having a child. However, their happiness is threatened when Dennis's resolved issues with Phil leads him to become embroiled in a conflict against his enemy and the square's crime kingpin: Johnny Allen (Billy Murray). When Sharon starts to intervene in Johnny's personal affairs in an attempt to warn him to stay away from Dennis, he throttles her warns her that he will kill Dennis unless they leave Walford by midnight on New Year's Eve. Sharon persuades Dennis to leave after confiding in Phil about Johnny's threat. Phil, seeking upmanship over Johnny, informs Dennis about the threat, telling him that Johnny also killed his friend, Andy Hunter (Michael Higgs), almost a year earlier, and informs him that Johnny had just threatened Sharon. Dennis ends up attacking Johnny. Just as the Square's residents are welcoming in the new year, he ends up getting stabbed by a mysterious passer-by. He stumbles upon Sharon and dies, leaving Sharon heartbroken and devastated. She refuses to speak in grief but requests that Phil avenges Dennis's murder.

Concerned for her unborn child, Phil persuades Sharon to return to Florida to live with Michelle; Sharon later gives birth off-screen to a son, Dennis Rickman Jnr (Harry Hickles), and informs Pauline.

During her absence, Phil keeps his promise for Sharon and persuades Grant to help them get justice for Sharon. They confront Johnny and learn that he ordered his henchman, Danny Moon (Jake Maskall), to kill Dennis; the two are nearly killed after Johnny captures the brothers and orders Danny to execute them, but Phil and Grant are saved when Danny is accidentally shot dead by his own brother, Jake Moon (Joel Beckett). Johnny's own daughter, Ruby Allen (Louisa Lytton), then turns him in to the police and he confessed to murdering Andy and ordering the murder of Dennis, but he dies a few months later after suffering a heart attack in prison.

On New Year's Day 2007, Sharon is unable to attend Pauline's funeral, although she sends flowers. On Christmas Day 2008, she calls Ian to wish him a happy Christmas and asks a reluctant Ian to send Phil a big kiss from her. Ian reveals that Dennis is also doing well. In October 2009, Ian spends a few weeks in America for Sharon's 40th birthday and reveals that she is doing very well for herself, explaining that she is still wealthy and lives on a ranch.

=== 2012–present ===
In August 2012, after more than six years away, Sharon returns to Walford asking Phil to help her retrieve Dennis from her fiancé, John Hewland (Jesse Birdsall), whom she has just jilted at their wedding ceremony. John suggests that he saved Sharon from destitution and kidnaps Dennis but Phil rescues him. Sharon manages Phil's nightclub "R&R" and starts dating Jack Branning (Scott Maslen). Sharon and Jack's romance is complicated by Phil, who wants to reignite a relationship with Sharon. Both propose to Sharon, but she accepts Jack's proposal. Realising he still loves his former wife, Ronnie Mitchell (Samantha Womack), Jack cancels the wedding. Phil then persuades Sharon to move in with him but she struggles with Jack's rejection and resumes dependency on painkillers. When Sharon passes out while looking after Phil's granddaughter, Lexi Pearce (Dotti-Beau Cotterill), he throws her out. The upheaval affects Dennis; he starts misbehaving and clashes at school with teaching assistant, Whitney Dean (Shona McGarty). Dennis lies when he falls and grazes his arm, telling Sharon that Whitney has assaulted him. Blind to Dennis's misbehaviour, Sharon reports Whitney to the school board requesting her dismissal but is forced to contemplate the truth when Whitney is exonerated.

Later, Sharon reunites with Phil and moves back in with him. Her trust in Phil is tested when he confesses his part in the events which led to the death of Dennis, but she nevertheless remains with him and together they buy a new bar: The Albert. Phil grows resentful of Sharon's preoccupation with The Albert. To re-assert his authority and demonstrate Sharon's vulnerability, Phil hires two men to vandalise the bar, but his plan goes awry when Sharon is attacked by the vandals; she is hospitalised with a ruptured spleen. Phil confides in his ex-lover, Shirley Carter (Linda Henry), who helps conceal his botched plan. When Shirley confesses she still loves Phil, he spurns her advances and instead proposes marriage to Sharon after she regains consciousness, which she accepts. Upon release from the hospital, Sharon fears being attacked again. She steals Ronnie's gun for protection but is horrified when Dennis almost finds it. While attempting to dispose of the gun, she overhears Shirley reprimanding Phil for arranging the attack on her. She vows revenge and recruits Phil's former lawyer, Marcus Christie (Stephen Churchett), to help fleece Phil. She later recants when she sees Phil's caring side but, unbeknownst to her, Phil has already discovered her deception. Phil begins an affair with Shirley and vows to humiliate Sharon by dumping her at their wedding so he can be with Shirley. On the wedding day, however, Phil cannot go through with this and after he and Sharon confront each other about their respective deceptions, they agree to marry. Enraged at Phil's rejection and unable to stop the marriage from going ahead, Shirley reveals her affair with Phil. Sharon decides to leave but Phil persuades her that he loves her. Shirley threatens to shoot him with Sharon's gun, but Phil dismisses her threats. In a tussle between the women, Shirley fires the gun and Phil is shot. When he recovers, they decide to give their marriage another try.

When Sharon receives a letter from Carol, she is ambivalent about resuming contact. She eventually decides to reconnect but discovers her mother has recently died. She meets with her half brother, Kristopher Hanley (Jonathan Broadbent), who gives her old letters from her birth father, Gavin Sullivan (Paul Nicholas), revealing his interest in meeting Sharon. Sharon attempts to trace Gavin and visits Den's former solicitor, Margaret Midhurst (Jan Harvey), who reveals that Den specifically requested to adopt Sharon as he knew her father. Phil is blackmailed into signing The Albert over to Vincent Hubbard (Richard Blackwood), forging Sharon's signature. Sharon is angry but Phil pacifies her by revealing he has traced her biological father, now going by the name of Gordon Cook (Stephen Marcus). Phil persuades Sharon not to pursue meeting Gordon, but she changes her mind and visits him. When Gordon is unwelcoming and cannot answer Sharon's questions, it emerges that Phil has paid Gordon to pretend to be Sharon's father. She eventually manipulates Phil into admitting the truth. Sharon forces Vincent to return his half of the business, but they agree to become business partners. To pacify Sharon, Phil gives her another address for her father. She sees from his house that he must be wealthy, and realises that the two already lead separate lives; she gives up the search. Sharon believes that Max Branning (Jake Wood) is responsible for the murder of Lucy Beale (Hetti Bywater) (see Who Killed Lucy Beale?) but she soon discovers the truth when Cindy Williams (Mimi Keene) sends her surrogate brother, Bobby Beale (Eliot Carrington), a video message on his laptop revealing that he killed her. Ian's wife, Jane Beale (Laurie Brett), denies this but when Sharon remains unconvinced, Jane admits the truth. When Phil continuously messages a person called "K", Sharon suspects that Phil is having an affair with "K" who, unbeknownst to her and Ian, is Kathy – his former wife who had supposedly died in a car crash in South Africa several years earlier. Sharon is reunited with Kathy; she reveals to Sharon that Phil has known that she has been alive for several years, so Sharon leaves Phil and moves into Ian's house. Phil goes missing and it is later revealed that Gavin, Kathy's controlling husband, has taken him hostage, although Phil later returns. Gavin had supposedly died in the same car crash as Kathy.

Sharon arrives home to find Gavin threatening to kill both Kathy and her stepson, Ben Mitchell (Harry Reid); he greets her with the words "Hello, Princess" – Den's catchphrase, revealing that he is her biological father. She is disgusted when she discovers that Gavin gave Sharon to Den as a business trade. Sharon discovers that Phil has started drinking again and has become violent. When Bobby starts bullying Dennis (now Bleu Landau), Sharon tells Jane and Ian that she will go to the police about Bobby killing Lucy. Bobby and Dennis' feud leads to Dennis going missing; when Ian and Phil find him, a drunk and distracted Phil crashes the car, leaving Dennis severely injured. Ian takes the blame for the crash in exchange for Phil convincing Sharon not to go to the police. Gavin visits and supports Sharon in the hospital, and offers her a chance to live with him in Hong Kong when Dennis recovers, but Sharon declines. Sharon is stunned when Phil admits he was driving, so she leaves him. She does not believe Phil when he says he is dying from cirrhosis, and she moves into Ian's house until Dennis is discharged. Gavin visits her again, saying he wants a second chance at having a family. Sharon then learns from Phil's daughter, Louise Mitchell (Tilly Keeper), that Phil has collapsed and is in hospital. At the hospital, Sharon realises Phil was telling the truth, but he has discharged himself to get drunk. When Dennis is discharged from the hospital, Sharon and Dennis leave to stay with Gavin.

Sharon returns with Dennis for Billy (Perry Fenwick) and Honey Mitchell's (Emma Barton) second engagement party only to find Phil collapsed on the floor from coughing up blood. His family discover at the hospital that unless Phil stops drinking and undergoes an urgent liver transplant, his condition will be terminal. Sharon refuses to reconcile with Phil and he files for divorce to which Sharon agrees. Sharon and Phil receive letters saying their divorce is close to being finalised, but they decide to rekindle their marriage. Sharon is unaware that Dennis has remained in contact with Gavin, but eventually finds out, and Buster Briggs (Karl Howman) tells her that Kathy has gone with Gavin, so they trace her to Gavin's house. As they arrive, Sharon's aunt and Gavin's sister, Margaret, falls to death on Buster's car after being pushed from a balcony by Gavin. Buster and Sharon break into the house to help Kathy, and Sharon urges Gavin to surrender himself to the police, promising to continue their relationship. Gavin decides to comply, but when she lets him out of the room, he tries to escape but is trapped on the balcony. The police arrive on the balcony and he threatens to jump with Sharon but lets her go and is arrested. Sharon returns when she hears that Ben is missing, and she contacts Grant to help find him. She is shocked when Grant's daughter, Courtney Mitchell (Alice Nokes), tells her that he is not returning, but she finds him and he tells her that he loves her, but Sharon turns him down. Phil then discovers a letter that Michelle sent to Peggy, learning that Grant fathered her son, Mark Fowler Jnr (Ned Porteous), after a one-night stand 21 years previously. To stop Phil from telling Grant that Mark is his son, Sharon tells Phil about Grant's declaration of love. However, Grant finds out the truth, and Sharon confirms it to Mark when he comes to the realisation.

When Phil recovers from his alcoholism, he makes the decision to not have a liver transplant and prepares to die. Sharon stands by his decision but he changes his mind after realising the effect on Dennis and Louise. Phil is placed on a transplant list but gives up hope, telling Sharon the family need to enjoy Christmas without him; she angrily tells him he can die. However, he returns shortly after, and a new liver is found for Phil and his surgery is successful. Sharon is then reunited with Michelle (now played by Jenna Russell), and at Michelle's leaving party, Sharon overhears Denise Fox (Diane Parish) revealing to Shirley that Phil is the father of her unborn child. Sharon makes plans for her and Dennis to move back to Florida with Michelle until she realises that she and Phil were not together at the time he had sex with Denise. Sharon finds out about Denise's plan to have her son adopted so tells Phil the truth after Phil expresses his wish to adopt Dennis. Phil demands to see his son, and Sharon agrees to help Phil fight for custody but then stands by him when he agrees to the adoption. Sharon is mortified when Michelle tells her that she broke the law in America by having a relationship with a 17-year-old student, Preston Cooper (Martin Anzor), while she was a teacher. When Michelle is involved in a car crash after her affair with Preston is exposed, Sharon supports her and she talks Preston into leaving Walford, which infuriates Michelle when she regains consciousness.

Sharon supports Louise when she believes she was raped by Keegan Baker (Zack Morris) after her drink was spiked at a party. The investigation is dropped when Keegan admits that he lied about having sex with Louise. Phil joins Aidan Maguire (Patrick Bergin) in a robbery but the money they steal from his ex-wife, Ciara (Denise McCormack), goes missing. Ciara sends her sister-in-law, Mel Owen (Tamzin Outhwaite), back to Walford after sixteen years, to find the stolen money, and Sharon admits to Mel that she took it. Mel tells Ciara and Sharon is forced to return the money. When Phil discovers that Sharon was the culprit, he is initially furious but comes around when she explains that she was stealing the money for him. Their marriage starts to deteriorate and Sharon grows bored and begins lusting over Phil's employee, Keanu Taylor (Danny Walters). After Phil announces he is going to Spain without Sharon, she grows even more tired of his neglect and has sex with Keanu. They arrange to meet again at the canal, but Keanu sees her best friend, Linda Carter (Kellie Bright), disposing of the gun used to shoot Stuart Highway (Ricky Champ). Sharon pays Keanu to remain silent, however, he posts the money back to Sharon and confesses to the police, leading to Linda's arrest. Despite this, Sharon and Keanu begin an affair and she is stunned to discover that he is 19 and younger than she believed him to be. The age proves too daunting for Sharon and she ends their affair, however, they later reconcile. Sharon starts receiving threats via text from an unknown person regarding their affair. She believes it to be Keanu's mother, Karen, (Lorraine Stanley) who had spotted them together, but it is Louise. Sharon is able to convince Louise that Keanu has been providing her with fitness lessons and Sharon, scared of sneaking behind Phil's back, ends the affair. They agree to remain friends but they continue to have sex until Sharon goes to Australia to stay with Michelle. She returns and realises that Keanu is now in a relationship with Louise, and turns down Keanu's advances. After Keanu ends his relationship with Louise and pursues Sharon again, she convinces Phil to send him on an errand in Spain, where he is brutally attacked. Karen blames Sharon, threatening to tell Phil about the affair unless he saves Keanu. Phil travels to Spain to help him, and he later returns to Walford, telling Sharon he blames her for what happened and struggles to forgive her.

Sharon later discovers that Dennis has been storing drugs and counterfeit money for drug dealers, which results in her attacking and threatening one of the dealers, Stix Redman (Kasey McKellar). After Louise is kidnapped and found by Keanu, Sharon is jealous when they resume their relationship. Louise later discovers she is pregnant with Keanu's baby and after they briefly reignite their affair, Sharon ends it so Keanu can be there for his child. However, Sharon also discovers she is pregnant but does not know if Phil or Keanu is the father. She settles on having an abortion, but Phil discovers she's pregnant, and Sharon lies letting Phil believe he is the father. When Keanu discovers that she is pregnant and that he could be the father, he decides that he should tell Louise about their affair. Sharon and Karen kidnap him in order to prevent this, in an attempt to scare him by showing him what Phil would do if he found out. After Sharon convinces him that Phil is the father, he returns home, promising not to reveal their affair. Mel's son, Hunter Owen (Charlie Winter), is shot dead by S019 officers, after holding Louise at gunpoint, and Phil tells Sharon to refuse Mel from using the E20 accounts to fund his funeral. Mel discovers that Keanu is the father of Sharon's baby and she blackmails Sharon for money and a villa in Portugal, as well as forcing her to sell her half of the E20 club to Ruby. Sharon finds out that Mel is planning on exposing her affair to Phil and follows her, so Mel hastily attempts to reveal it on a phone via Billy. Before she can tell Billy, Mel crashes into another car and falls unconscious. Whilst Sharon rescues Mel from the wreckage before it explodes, Mel continues to hear Hunter's voice and walks into the road and is fatally hit by a lorry. Lisa Fowler (Lucy Benjamin), whom Mel confided to, tells Phil that Sharon's baby is not his, and Phil's suspicions are aroused further at Mel's funeral when Lisa announces to the pub that Sharon is carrying another man's child and that she was only paying for Mel's funeral out of guilt, though Sharon denies this. Phil secretly discovers that Keanu is the father and confronts Sharon on Christmas Day, ending their marriage. Sharon is disowned by the Mitchell family, including Dennis. She is taken in by Ian. When Keanu goes missing, Sharon fears that Phil has had him murdered, but Linda tells her that she and Martin Fowler (James Bye) faked his death in order to trick Ben and that there is evidence on Martin's burner phone. Sharon later breaks into Martin's shed and steals the phone, giving it to the police and leading to Phil and Ben's arrests. Soon after, Dennis drowns in a boat crash, and on the same day, Sharon gives birth to a son, Albie Watts (Arthur Gentleman), who Karen names 'Kayden' at first. She finds out from Karen that Phil had caused the boat crash whilst fighting Keanu. Sharon contemplates suicide but is stopped by Ian who supports her. Sharon is furious when Phil returns to Dennis's funeral but eventually, bonds with him and they share a kiss. They reunite and Phil promises to buy Sharon The Queen Vic, but Sharon struggles and leaves to stay with Michelle in Australia, without Albie.

Sharon returns and decides to reunite with Phil once more and they move in together. Sharon decides to take Albie from Karen, but Phil is furious and cannot bond with Albie. He forces Sharon to choose between him and Albie, but Sharon chooses Albie and they separate. Ian purchases the Queen Vic for Sharon and she later renames Kayden to Albie. Ian redevelops feelings for Sharon; he is embarrassed when his feelings are not reciprocated by Sharon, and he proceeds to harass her. Ian is unaware that Sharon and Phil are working together to murder him for locking Dennis inside the boat, which hindered his escape from the accident. Ian is attacked by Phil, and Sharon lets Ian believe that she loves him, and marries him when he thinks he is dying. When Phil decides to back out from their plot, Sharon is set on avenging Dennis by poisoning Ian to make him ill, starting with poisoning his Christmas Pudding. Phil comes around and provides Sharon with many poisons to spike his drinks with, before providing Sharon with a lethal dose of cocaine to put into Ian's pasta carbonara and ultimately kill him. Sharon cannot go through with it, but Ian finds out the truth and confronts Sharon. She attacks Ian by branding him weak and cowardly, causing Ian to eat the poisoned pasta. Sharon has a change of heart and makes Ian throw up the pasta, thereby saving his life, and annuls her marriage to Ian, who leaves Walford. Sharon becomes sole proprietor of the Vic after Ian's departure and he transfers ownership to her, but a week later she sells the pub back to the Carters after Linda finds out about her involvement in Ian's attack, and blackmails her. Sharon is told by Kathy that Gavin has died, and she finds out that she has a half-brother, Zack Hudson (James Farrar). She decides to open a gym and has a fling with Kheerat Panesar (Jaz Deol), which ends when Ben, who is Kheerat's business partner, objects to their relationship. Sharon grows guilty for her treatment of Ian when she sees Tina Carter (Luisa Bradshaw-White) get framed for his attack, leading to her disappearance, unaware that she has been murdered by Gray Atkins (Toby-Alexander Smith). Sharon decides to confess the truth to the police, despite Phil's attempts to stop her, and he is arrested.

A baby, Alyssa Lennox, is left on Sharon's doorstep and she soon discovers that Alyssa was Dennis' daughter, making her Sharon's granddaughter, after a brief relationship with Jada Lennox (Kelsey Calladine-Smith), before his death. Sharon supports Jada and Alyssa, but Phil encourages Sharon to go for full custody when he believes that Jada is irresponsible. They keep this a secret from Jada, but Zack discovers the truth and tells her, and Jada flees with Alyssa. Sharon disowns Zack but they reconcile when he convinces Jada to return with Alyssa. Sharon discovers that Ben is the "Walford Attacker" when she catches him bludgeoning a man with a pole. She agrees to keep quiet and tells Phil, who asks her to assist his now-fiancée, Kat, in managing his businesses. When Sam returns to Walford and buys Ruby's nightclub – renaming it "Peggy's", Phil sacks her for her incompetence and instates Sharon as bar manager instead. Sam threatens to inform Kat about Sharon and Phil's secret prison meetings unless she is reinstated back as bar manager, but Sharon forces her to drop her threats when she warns her of the consequences of crossing Phil. Sharon later learns from Linda that Sam had purchased the club from the money that Janine Butcher (Charlie Brooks) had stolen from Linda's daughter Nancy Carter (Maddy Hill) and her boyfriend Zack, to give to Linda who invested it with Denise into her salon 'Fox & Hair', which Denise sold one half of and gave the money to Sam, who was blackmailing her. On the opening of Peggy's, Sharon, Kat, Sam, and Shirley are held hostage by henchmen sent from Phil's old business associate Jonah Tyler (Mark Mooney) to sabotage the event, resulting in Sam getting shot, though they are unaware that Sam had orchestrated the siege. Shortly after, Kat discovers that Sharon has been secretly visiting Phil in prison and sacks her. Sharon continues to visit Phil and is distraught when Phil is presumed dead after turning down protection from the police by refusing to become an informant. It later transpires that Phil had decided to take the offer and he returns, professing his love to Sharon. Their romance is halted when Phil discovers that Sharon had been secretly messaging Grant and he reunites with Kat. Sharon then develops a feud with Kat when Phil continues to entrust her with his business dealings, making Kat jealous. Sharon is devastated when Phil proposes to Kat and plans to sabotage their wedding; when Kat fails to show up, Sharon comforts Phil and reveals her feelings. They share a kiss which is interrupted by Kat who arrives at the wedding, after being trapped in a boat by her ex-husband, Alfie Moon (Shane Richie). Phil and Kat do not marry, but Sharon is upset when they move it to another date.

Months later, Sharon is reunited with Keanu when he returns to see their son Albie. Sharon is initially hostile towards Keanu, but they resolve their past grievances and Sharon discovers that she still has feelings for him. They later share a kiss, but Sharon tells Keanu that they cannot have a relationship due to the annoyance of Phil and Karen. They decide to remain friends, but cannot hide their feelings and they resume their relationship. When Sharon discovers that Keanu had previously had a fling with Sam whilst living in Spain, she ends their relationship, and Keanu proceeds to sleep with Chelsea Fox (Zaraah Abrahams). Sharon realises that she has made a mistake and reconciles with Keanu. However, she is hurt when she learns that he has slept with Chelsea and she ends things once again. Linda suggests that Sharon should buy her deceased husband, Mick Carter's (Danny Dyer) share of The Queen Vic when his death certificate is released, to which Sharon agrees. Sharon sells half of her gym to Phil and Kat in order to raise the money, though secretly Linda has also entered into negotiations with Nish (Navin Chowdhry) and Suki Panesar (Balvinder Sopal). Keanu attempts to win Sharon back by proposing to her during the gym relaunch. Sharon turns him down and decides that they should remain in a relationship. Keanu persuades Sharon to have a christening for Albie, but unbeknownst to Sharon, he has been reluctantly smuggling drugs for Nish's son, Ravi Gulati (Aaron Thiara), in order to fund it. Albie's christening is conducted by Duncan, but the service is interrupted when Keanu is arrested for possession of drugs. Upset by his actions, Sharon breaks up with him. When Keanu is found unconscious and close to death in the middle of the square after being assaulted by Ravi, Sharon stands by him and reports Ravi to the police. She soon becomes engaged to Keanu, and Nish attempts to threaten them into silence but Sharon rebuffs his threats. Sharon is furious when Linda breaks off their partnership and chooses her mother, Elaine Peacock (Harriet Thorpe), as the co-owner of The Queen Vic instead. Sharon and Keanu later split after she helps Lisa to leave the country with Louise and Keanu's daughter, Peggy Taylor (Hallie), with Keanu unable to forgive Sharon for her betrayal. Sharon and Linda then reconcile after being locked in The Vic cellar together.

Sharon considers moving to Abu Dhabi after she is offered a job there and plans on taking Albie. In an attempt to keep Albie to himself, Keanu abducts him with the help of Karen, and plans on fleeing the country with him, however the plan goes wrong and in a moment of desperation, Keanu lies and claims that Albie was abducted in the park. Sharon is devastated over her son's kidnapping and later receives a ransom note, written by Karen, demanding £50,000 in exchange for Albie's safe return. Sharon borrows the money from Phil and pays the ransom and Albie is returned to her. Following the ordeal, Keanu and Sharon reconcile their relationship once again and become engaged again. Sharon is shocked when blood tests carried out for Albie reveal that Keanu isn't his father after all and that Phil is his biological father, however she decides to keep this to herself, although she later tells Linda whilst Kat also overhears but agrees to keep quiet when Sharon threatens to ruin her and Phil's marriage. Sharon is horrified when Phil reveals that Karen was behind Albie's kidnapping and she slaps Karen, whilst Keanu lets his mother take the fall for his actions. On her wedding day to Keanu on Christmas Day, Phil interrupts the ceremony and reveals that Keanu was involved in Albie's kidnapping, which his sister, Bernadette Taylor (Clair Norris), confirms. Sharon is disgusted at the revelation and slaps Keanu in the face. Sharon then reveals to him that he isn't Albie's father and that Phil is, however Phil overhears this and is shocked at what he has heard. Sharon calls off the wedding and goes back to the Vic with Linda and Kathy for a lock-in, where they are later joined by Denise, Stacey and Suki. Nish comes to the Vic after Sharon and the others encourage Suki to invite him and stand up for herself, however the confrontation turns violent when Nish begins attacking Suki and Denise hits him over the head with a bottle of wine in defense. Sharon then declares Nish dead when she is unable to find a pulse, and Keanu arrives at the Vic seeing Sharon standing over Nish's body. He then tries to go upstairs to get Albie and threatens to have Sharon sent to prison for killing Nish, to which Sharon rebukes his threats and taunts him about not being Albie's father. Keanu turns violent and in a moment of rage, he begins strangling Sharon, leading to Linda stabbing him in the back with a meat thermometer and killing him. A grief stricken Sharon leaves for Australia with Albie to see Michelle.

Upon returning, Sharon decides to help the other women by disposing of the meat thermometer after Linda fails to do so, but it goes missing just as Keanu's body is discovered. As the prime suspect for Keanu's murder, Sharon is arrested. Linda eventually finds the meat thermometer, and Stacey devises a plan to frame Linda's rapist, Dean Wicks (Matt Di Angelo), by planting the object in his apartment. Dean is arrested despite proclaiming his innocence, leading to Sharon's release. Sharon confides in Phil about Nish's attack and Linda's role in Keanu's death. Phil agrees to keep quiet, and they share a kiss, but Sharon feels it is too soon for another relationship and refuses to reunite with him. Sharon is tricked by Reiss Colwell (Jonny Freeman) into investing so he can steal her and Phil's money. She becomes close to Phil's relative, Teddy Mitchell (Roland Manookian), who decides to help them retrieve the money from Reiss. Sharon is falsely accused by Bernadette of being Keanu's killer, and Bernadette starts blackmailing Linda, believing she is protecting Sharon, unaware that Linda is the culprit. During Dean's trial for Keanu's murder, Sharon has an argument with the judge after he dishonors her, and she is sent to prison for seven days after being held in contempt of court. While in prison, Sharon is reunited with Chrissie. Sharon forgives Chrissie for killing Den and tells Chrissie about her role in Keanu's death. After she discovers that Chrissie has set her up for a fight with other inmates, she takes back her forgiveness. During a riot in the wing, Chrissie drags Sharon back to her cell, threatening her with a shiv and boiling water. She reveals that she had miscarried Jake's baby after being imprisoned, and blames Sharon for teaming up with the Mitchells, putting her in prison. As Chrissie attempts to stab Sharon, the guards intervene and place Chrissie in segregation. Before being taken away, Chrissie threatens to expose Sharon's involvement in Keanu's murder. Sharon decides not to report the incident, and they later make amends before Chrissie is released. Chrissie also reveals that her former cellmate, Ruby, had left prison to give birth to Martin's child, Roman Allen (Leo). After being released, she promises to be there for Linda when she is confronted by Elaine, who now knows about the murder. Sharon effectively evades justice for her part in Keanu's death when Nish himself takes credit for the murder, resulting in his arrest; she subsequently convinces Bernadette not to report her or the others to the police when she returns to Walford after Linda confessed to her in the aftermath of Dean's trial.

Sharon becomes concerned for Phil's mental health when he sells the nightclub to Teddy's ex-wife, Nicola Mitchell (Laura Doddington), believing he is becoming more isolated from the others. When Nish escapes prison, Teddy comforts a fearful Sharon; the two then have sex. When Nicola attempts to force Phil to relapse in the hopes of breaking up Teddy and Sharon, Sharon becomes fully aware of Phil's loneliness, but Phil refuses any more help. On Christmas Day 2024, Sharon visits Phil after he walks out of the Mitchell family Christmas dinner, where she discusses her concern for Phil's emotional state with Nigel Bates (Paul Bradley). Sharon's continues to worry about Phil despite his insistence that he is fine. Phil goes missing during Billy and Honey's wedding, and Sharon, Grant, Nigel, and Linda search for him. Sharon becomes trapped under rubble when The Queen Vic explodes after Reiss accidentally crashes into gas canisters that start a fire. She hallucinates her mother, Angie, who convinces her to keep living by screaming for help. Grant saves Sharon but she is devastated to learn that Martin died in the accident. After being discharged from hospital and an argument with Teddy over him declining a call from Michelle, Sharon and Grant sleep together. Zack reveals to Sharon that he is Barney Mitchell's (Lewis Bridgeman) father, revealing that he had a fling with Nicola years ago. When Nicola arranges for Zack to be attacked so he can keep quiet, Sharon confronts Nicola, leading to a fight. Barney discovers that Sharon slept with Grant, and his revelation ends Sharon and Teddy's relationship. Following Martin's funeral, she leaves Walford to stay with Jada before visiting Michelle.

Months later, Sharon returns to Walford, finding out that Zoe too has returned to Albert Square; Sharon and Vicki (Alice Haig) still hold animosity towards her for her role in Den's murder. After Vicki and Zoe fight in the Square, Sharon confronts Zoe, where she reveals that she had a son whom she gave up at birth, and claims that the father was Sharon's late husband, Dennis. Sharon is devastated at the idea that Dennis could have cheated on her, but following a talk with Ian and Kathy, she decides to help Zoe find her son, viewing him as the last connection she has to Dennis. Sharon supports Vicki after she is brutally attacked by her stepson Joel Marshall (Max Murray), and she and Sharon take her for a trip to the Lake District to come to terms with her trauma. In her absence, it is revealed that Dennis is not the father of Zoe's child. This revelation deeply distresses Sharon, and she decides not to return to Walford, choosing instead to stay with Michelle in Florida so she can come to terms with Zoe's lies. She later returns to Walford to attend Vicki's wedding to Ross Marshall (Alex Walkinshaw), where she learns of Vicki's affair with Zack, and soon returns to Florida. Upon her return to Walford, Sharon informs Phil of her decision to sell her share in the gym.

== Reception ==
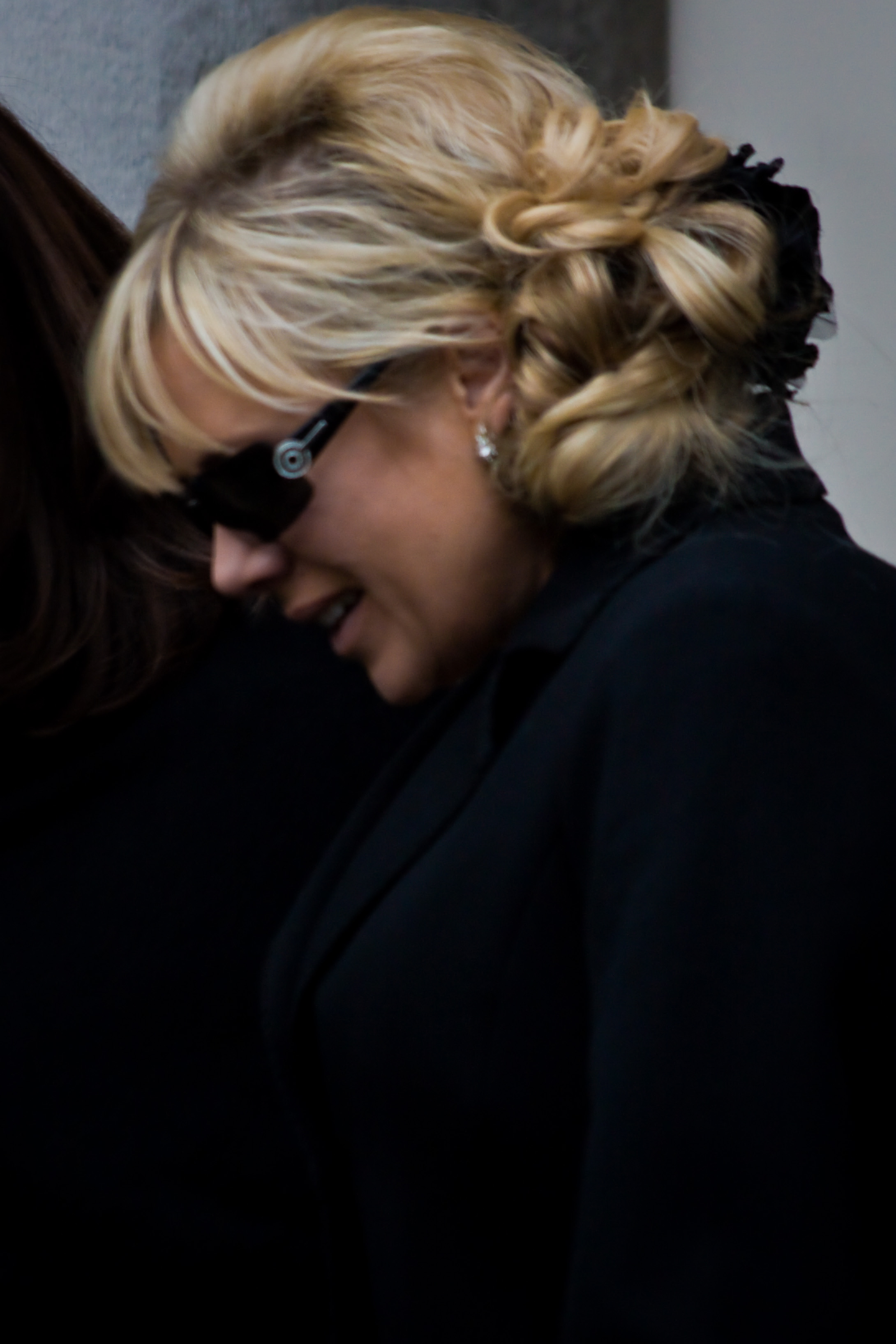
Letitia Dean (pictured), has been nominated for numerous awards for the role of Sharon Watts. In 2005, Inside Soap honoured her with an "Outstanding Achievement Award".

Sharon has been dubbed one of the "most popular" characters in EastEnders. Television critic Matt Bayliss, who once wrote storylines for EastEnders, suggested in 2010 that what made Sharon an interesting, classic, female character was that her psychology was laid bare; viewers could see how her troubled upbringing contributed to the mistakes she made and the low self-esteem she had in latter life. In December 2004 the Sunday Mirror reported that executive producer Kathleen Hutchison offered to double Letitia Dean's salary from £150,000 a year to £300,000 a year, to persuade her to remain in the show, making her one of the highest paid actresses in British soap opera. In a 2007 poll carried out by Inside Soap, Sharon, who was then on a hiatus from EastEnders, was voted the character that readers most wanted to see return. In a NTL poll in 2003, one third of viewers picked Sharon's comeback in 2001 as their favourite, and in a Radio Times poll of over 5,000 people in 2004, 21% chose Sharon as the soap character they were most pleased to see return.

Letitia Dean has been nominated for multiple awards for her portrayal of Sharon. In 1995, she was nominated in the "Most Popular Actress" category at the National Television Awards. Dean was nominated for the "Best Actress Award" at The British Soap Awards in 2004, and she was also nominated in the category of "Best Dramatic Performance" for "Den's Return". At the 2005 Inside Soap awards, Dean was presented with the coveted award for outstanding achievement as homage to her work in EastEnders; at the time of the awards ceremony, she had appeared in EastEnders (on and off) for over 20 years. She was also nominated in the category of Best Couple (shared with Nigel Harman). Dean was nominated for "Best Actress" for the Inside Soap Awards 2014. In November 2018, Sharon's pairing with Keanu was nominated for Best Soap Couple at the 2018 Digital Spy Reader Awards; they came in ninth place with 4% of the total votes.

In 2001, a storyline that saw Sharon confessing to her lover Phil that she was infertile was discussed in The Guardian by Jenni Murray. Of interest to the journalist was Sharon's declaration that she had become infertile because she aborted Grant's baby in 1995, and although the abortion was successful, she did not take a post-op course of anti-biotics; it was a subsequent infection that left her infertile. Of concern to Murray was the deleterious effect that broadcasting such a negative outcome of abortion may have on any female viewers considering the procedure. Murray stated: "It's easy to see why infertility as a result of abortion is manna from heaven to writers hungry for dramatic storylines. Could there be any greater irony than to abort the foetus of one man [Grant], fall in love with his brother [Phil], long to have his child and then find that the dire consequences of the first action deprive you of the delights of the second [...] But how much poetic licence has to be employed to service these plots in which women are consistently punished for exercising their legal right to choose to abort a foetus they don't want to carry? In Sharon's case because she was running away from a violent man". Discussing the matter, Ann Furedi of the British Pregnancy Advisory Service confirmed a relatively high risk of infection from abortion, but opined that any good service provides anti-biotics and screens for chlamydia, so the risks are manageable, and the risks of hysterectomy are so rare as to be "negligible". Furedi said that women who consider abortion often feel ambivalent, guilty and have an exaggerated sense of the risks to their future fertility and she suggested that TV makers were "cruel, not just wrong [...] to crank up those fears.". David Painton, a leading authority on abortion, expressed concern that such storylines bolster the views of anti-abortionists who "claim wrongly that the procedure is dangerous". Painton stated that although it is now virtually unknown for women to have difficulty conceiving again following a termination, if their doctor instructs a course of anti-biotics to stop infection, then it is important to take the medication. Summarising the storyline and its potential impact, Murray said, "In some ways, the EastEnders story could be seen as a useful cautionary tale. Sharon was properly informed about the risk, failed to act on her doctor's advice and suffers the consequences of her own failure. The scriptwriters can't be accused of presenting a false picture, although it's hard to imagine how anyone with half a brain, told that a course of antibiotics will protect her future fertility, wouldn't take the trouble to swallow a few tablets for a week."

Discussing Sharon's initial exit in 1995, Allison Pearson, writing for The Independent felt that the script, which saw Sharon misleading Grant into a reunion, was not in-keeping with the character. She commented, "In soap, character is destiny, and I have to say that I didn't really believe in Sharon's plan for elaborate revenge on Grant. It was a mechanism for getting actress Letitia Dean her freedom and not true to the nature of the character we had grown to know. You could not fault the central performances, though. Albert Square will be a less rounded place without Sharon." Conversely, reporter Matthew Bayliss was positive about the exit stating, "[Sharon] survived the sort of shunning normally suffered by 13th-century Welsh witches in order to wreak the perfect revenge on Grant, tricking him into publicly proposing to her, just so she could turn him down. Rarely has a character's exit been so satisfying to watch, and it was a homage to Sharon's strengths as a character that she left with so much unfinished business behind her."

When it was announced in 2000 that Sharon was returning, Bayliss received the news positively. He suggested that viewers had invested a lot in Sharon, in that they had come to believe in her, having followed her over a large number of years, transgressing from teenager to adult. He described Sharon as an engaging, complex and great soap character, commending the producers of EastEnders for bringing her back. He commented, "with a vintage original such as Sharon as [EastEnders'] latest weapon in the ratings war, it's hard to see what can go wrong."

During a period of falling ratings amid heavy media criticism aimed at EastEnders in 2004, executive producer Louise Berridge spoke to the press about reasons for viewer complaints. She claimed that one reason viewers felt EastEnders had been weaker in 2004, was because some were displeased when storylines that they "love", such as the Sharon-Dennis romance, were not featured prominently at all times. She commented, "it's disappointing to read that a large number of viewers feel the show has been weaker over this past year—although to some extent I fear this was inevitable. In a way, it has been a victim of its own success. The phenomenal popularity of the Kat and Alfie storyline was such that some viewers complained if these characters were not the centre of every storyline. A similar thing is happening with the tremendously successful 'Shannis' storyline (the affair between Dennis and Sharon)—people love it so much, hundreds are writing in demanding to see more of it."

Sarah Ellis of Inside Soap said that the magazine's staff had never been so excited as they were when they heard Sharon was returning in 2012. She said that they were "dying" to know which male character Sharon will take an interest in first. Ross Kemp who played Grant Mitchell and Steve McFadden who plays Phil Mitchell expressed pleasure at the return of Sharon and Letitia Dean in 2012, with McFadden suggesting that Letitia's former stint in EastEnders was part of a golden era of the soap opera. He described her return as brilliant.

Media reporter for The Guardian Stuart Heritage was critical about EastEnders decision to reintroduce Sharon for the third time in 2012, suggesting that it meant that the programme had run out of original ideas. Heritage commented, "Even Letitia Dean has probably lost count of the times she's left and returned as Sharon. She's spent the last 18 years running away to the United States, only to come back to buy a pub or bury her mum, or to have sex with a Mitchell brother, or the other Mitchell brother, or her own adopted sibling, or to confront her inexplicably twice-dead father. Often Sharon's haircut will imperceptibly change upon her arrival, but everything else—the quivering lip, the worrying breathlessness, the consistent inability to refer to Phil Mitchell as anything other than 'Fiw'—remains the same. This is how it's likely to be this time around, regardless of if anyone actually wants her back or not [...] There are other offenders—Bianca, Janine, Mandy, Grant—but Sharon is the worst, simply because she's so prolific". Letitia Dean defended her comeback saying, "I think with any sort of ongoing drama like EastEnders you need old blood, new blood, it just needs a balance." Steve McFadden added, "What Letitia is doing is bringing back some history and you can't buy that. It takes years to build that up."

In 2020, Sara Wallis and Ian Hyland from The Daily Mirror placed Sharon first on their ranked list of the best EastEnders characters of all time, calling her "Queen Sharon" and noting that she has been involved in some of the soap's "most memorable storylines" such as Sharongate and becoming pregnant at the age of 50 from her affair with the younger Keanu.

== In popular culture ==
The character of Sharon has been spoofed in the ITV cartoon sketch show 2DTV where in one sketch, she was likened to the Jim Henson Muppet Miss Piggy. The character has also been spoofed by the impressionist Ronni Ancona in the BBC's Big Impression. Ancona's impression mocked Sharon's pronunciation, implying that she pouts a lot and that she looks badly dubbed, as her lips quiver after delivering a line. The episodes featuring Sharon aired on the Christmas Day special of the programme in 2001.

The character was also spoofed in the BBC comedy sketch show The Real McCoy. One of the show's recurring sketches featured a spoof version of EastEnders, with black and Asian comedians taking over roles of well-known EastEnders characters who frequent a pub called Rub-a-Dub. Actress and comedian Meera Syal played the role of Sharon in the sketches.

Impressionist Francine Lewis performed an impression of Sharon Watts in the seventh series of Britain's Got Talent.

== Bibliography ==
- Brake, Colin (1995). EastEnders: The First 10 Years: A Celebration. BBC Books. ISBN 978-0-563-37057-4.
- Smith, Julia; Holland, Tony (1987). EastEnders—The Inside Story. Book Club Associates. ISBN 978-0-563-20601-9.
- Smith, Rupert (2005). EastEnders: 20 years in Albert Square. BBC Books. ISBN 978-0-563-52165-5.
