= Sharongate =

EastEnders storyline from 1994

Sharon's affair with Phil (left) is discovered by Grant (right), a storyline dubbed Sharongate (1994)

"Sharongate" is the term used for a storyline in the BBC soap opera EastEnders, which reached its climax on 24 October 1994, attracting 25.3 million viewers, making it one of the most watched scripted broadcasts of all time in the UK. The plot was written by EastEnders scriptwriter Tony Jordan. In the storyline, Sharon Mitchell (Letitia Dean) confessed on tape that she had had sex with her brother-in-law, Phil (Steve McFadden). The truth comes out in the middle of The Queen Victoria pub. Sharon's husband Grant (Ross Kemp) attacked Phil and he was lucky to survive.

A similar storyline, dubbed “Sheanu”, started in 2018 when Sharon, now married to Phil, began an affair with Keanu Taylor (Danny Walters). Sharon later becomes pregnant and, following a DNA test, discovers Keanu is the father. The climax of the story aired on 25 December 2019 when Phil discovers the truth, attracting 7.21 million viewers. Her and Phil then divorce. However, in 2023, Sharon, now engaged to Keanu, discovers that her son, Albie Watts (Arthur Gentleman), is in fact Phil’s son, not Keanu’s. She discovers this after Albie is kidnapped, unaware that it was Keanu behind it. On Christmas Day 2023, Keanu’s sister Bernadette Taylor (Clair Norris) revealed to Sharon the truth about the kidnapping, before Sharon then revealed Albie’s true paternity, bringing a final conclusion to the storyline. Later in the episode, Keanu is killed off as part of The Six storyline. This episode attracted 5.45 million viewers.

== Storyline development ==
One of the most notable and popular EastEnders storylines is a love triangle between the characters Grant Mitchell, his wife Sharon and his brother Phil. The plot has been described by former Executive Producer of EastEnders and BBC's Head of Drama Serials, John Yorke, as a "Tristan and Isolde story".

Despite the fact that Sharon marries Grant initially, EastEnders writer Tony Jordan has revealed in The Mitchells – The Full Story that the love-triangle storyline had been planned since Phil and Grant's introduction in 1990, after the writers came to the realisation that Sharon was perfect for them both.

This storyline was slow burning and was spread over several years, providing a plethora of dramatic tension along the way. The episode in which Phil betrays his brother with Sharon occurred in September 1992 in one of the soap's notorious three-handers. Sue Dunderdale directed the episodes and the performances of McFadden, Kemp and Dean have been described as memorable and filled with high-tension drama. Things finally came to a head in October 1994 with some of EastEnders' most popular and renowned episodes, which have been dubbed "Sharongate".

The episodes—which were watched by 25.3 million viewers—turn on Grant's discovery of the affair and his startling reaction. On-screen Grant accidentally hears Sharon unwittingly confessing to the affair on tape. He reacts by playing it to a pub full of people at Phil's engagement party and then beats his brother unconscious. The aftermath of the storyline eventually sees Sharon depart Walford after ten years in the show and the repercussions of Phil's betrayal contribute to many subsequent storylines involving the Mitchell brothers throughout the 1990s.

Writer of Sharongate, Tony Jordan, has stated that of all the storylines he has penned for the soap, Sharongate is the one he is most proud of. He comments "Three of the strongest characters that have ever been in EastEnders are the Mitchell brothers and Sharon... when we actually blew that story it was incredible... being able to reach that many people with your work is what makes EastEnders exciting." Sharongate's success with viewers was not equalled until six years later, in 2001, when EastEnders screened the highly publicised Who Shot Phil? storyline. Sally Vincent, a journalist for The Guardian, wrote that Sharongate's success "wasn't so much the guilt-stacked, long-drawn-out business of Sharon 'n' Phil's helpless lust for each other – all that unseemly face-sucking while her hubby/his brother, the ape-like Grant, languished in gaol for trying to set fire to everyone – that broke the ratings record, nor was it the ingenious ruse of using a tape to broadcast Sharon's poignant little confession to the entire clientele of Walford's Queen Vic ... it was the fact that we'd all watched Sharon grow up. We knew that she was a nice little person, vulnerable, brave, sweet-natured and kind to the dog. We were sorry for her...Neither of those Mitchells deserved her, so when one punched the other into the garage pit and half-killed him for tampering with his lady-wife, we didn't much care. We were sorry to see [Sharon] go."

== Plot ==
Sharon Watts (Letitia Dean) becomes part of the Mitchell family when she marries Grant Mitchell (Ross Kemp) in December 1991. But months later the couple begin rowing. Grant wants a wife who behaves like one, and Sharon refuses to comply. He also wants a baby but Sharon prefers to concentrate on making The Queen Victoria pub a success to honor her late father Den Watts (Leslie Grantham), The Vic's previous landlord.

During a major row in July 1992, Sharon confesses that she has carried on taking the contraceptive pill because she doesn't want to have a baby with Grant. He loses his temper, and after smashing The Vic up he disappears for a few weeks, leaving brother Phil Mitchell (Steve McFadden) to comfort a devastated Sharon. Sharon begins to wonder if she has married the wrong brother. Grant returns, and despite promises to try harder he immediately returns to his old ways, staying out with his friends all night and leaving Phil to help Sharon run the pub in his place. Grant's thuggish behaviour only brings Sharon and Phil closer together. Sharon confides in Phil while clearing glasses away and one night they both kiss, and this eventually leads to Phil and Sharon beginning their affair; however, Sharon cannot bring herself to leave Grant, and upon his return she chooses him rather than Phil.

Grant's reign of terror continues, and he begins to get involved with crime. He intimidates Sharon and her friends; he smashes up The Vic again and later, sets fire to it in an insurance scam, unaware that Sharon is inside. Sharon is furious when she discovers his involvement in the fire at her beloved pub and when Grant realises his marriage is over and wants to sell The Vic, she decides to take a holiday to visit her mother Angie Watts (Anita Dobson) in America in January 1993. Upon her return three months later, she attempts to seize Grant's half of The Queen Vic and gain full control. More arguments follow and after another heated argument Grant hits Sharon across the face. Sharon tries to hide her injuries, but both Phil and Michelle Fowler (Susan Tully), Sharon's best friend, notice there is something wrong.

When Grant's behaviour does not improve, Michelle calls the police, but when they arrive Grant loses his temper and begins attacking them. He badly injures one policeman and Michelle gets punched by Grant. Grant is arrested and sent to prison on remand. With Grant out of the way, Sharon's affair with Phil resumes. While he is serving his prison sentence, Grant begins to suspect that his wife may be seeing someone else, and threatens to kill the man if he ever finds him. Phil then has to mediate between his brother and his lover. However, Sharon and Phil are both tormented with feelings of guilt, and neither want to tell Grant the truth. When Grant is finally released from prison, Sharon takes pity on him, and by the end of June that year they reunite. Phil, still in love with Sharon, marries Nadia Borovac (Anna Barkan), a Romanian refugee so she can gain a visa, though their marriage is short-lived. After Phil's first marriage collapses, he begins a relationship with Kathy Beale (Gillian Taylforth) and the two are eventually engaged. When Sharon learns of the engagement and visits Phil, with the hope of reigniting their affair, they kiss, but Phil suddenly stops himself and throws her out.

The storyline eventually comes to a climax in October 1994. Sharon has put her affair with Phil behind her and she and Grant are even thinking about starting a family. Michelle's boyfriend, Geoff Barnes (David Roper), has an idea about interviewing local girls for his book about the 'social and economic importance of women in the East End'. Sharon agrees to contribute, so long as Michelle conducts the interview. During the autumn of 1994 the interview takes place, with Michelle taping the conversation on a tape recorder. However the girls forget to turn the tape recorder off after the interview finishes, and prompted by Michelle, Sharon begins to reveal the full details of her affair with Phil, leaving the incriminating evidence in the tape machine, which eventually finds its way into the glove compartment of Grant's car - for him to find later.

Weeks later, on the night of Phil and Kathy's engagement party, Grant goes on an errand to collect some beer from a nearby pub. On his drive home, he searches through the glove compartment to find a cassette to put on, and by chance chooses the one containing the incriminating interview. On hearing Sharon's confession that she had sex with Phil, Grant goes into a state of shock and anger. He arrives at The Queen Vic pub, where the party is taking place, stops the music and then plays the tape to the crowded pub. Kathy reacts by slapping Sharon and calling her a slut, whilst Grant goes to The Arches garage, later followed by Phil who tries to explain. Grant then beats him up, leaving him hospitalised with a ruptured spleen.

Phil spends some time in intensive care, but goes on to make a full recovery from his injuries. He and Grant reconcile after Grant coerces him into blaming Sharon for their affair. Grant makes Sharon's life a misery. He constantly humiliates her in public, branding her "the pub whore", and acts in an aggressive manner, which includes smashing plates on the table where she is sitting. Sharon wants to reconcile so she puts up with the abuse for several months, refusing to give in to his demands for a divorce. However, Grant finds ever more inventive ways to humiliate her and by Christmas Day that year Sharon finally agrees to sign the divorce papers. She moves to the United States to live with Angie. This leads to the return of Peggy Mitchell (Barbara Windsor), the mother of Phil and Grant, who takes over as acting landlady in Sharon's place.

Sharon returns in March 1995 to hostility from Grant, Phil and Peggy. Sharon is not perturbed and her gutsy behaviour eventually earns her the respect of her ex-husband Grant, who begins to realise that he is still in love with her. Sharon is determined to get revenge for her mistreatment, so she leads Grant on, while confessing to Michelle that it is really her plan to publicly humiliate him. She leads him to believe that a public proposal of remarriage would seal their reunion. Grant decides to pop the question at The Queen Vic pub quiz night, and Sharon is ready to turn him down in front of the packed pub and his family. However, in the end, she cannot go through with it, and stops him from proposing before he humiliates himself. She then confesses to him that she still loves him, before heading for America to join her mother, leaving Grant devastated. Before she returns to Angie in America, Sharon reluctantly sells her half of The Queen Vic to Peggy.

== Reception and legacy ==
"Sharongate" has proven to be a popular storyline with viewers. In 2001 it was voted the second "Best Ever Soap Moment" in an ITV televised poll, and it was voted the sixth top soap opera moment of all time in a poll of 17,000 people for What's on TV magazine in 2003. In 2010, Michael Hogan from The Telegraph ranked it the sixth of the top ten "unforgettable moments" of EastEnders.

In September 2014, Sharon eventually marries Phil. EastEnders later made several nods to the storyline throughout 2018 and 2019, when Sharon has an affair with Keanu Taylor (Danny Walters). Fans also noted that the affair was almost revealed through a sound system in November 2019, in a similar way that "Sharongate" was ended.
