= Barry Hill =

Barry Hill may refer to:

- Barry Hill (British writer) (born 1937), British television scriptwriter and dramatist
- Barry Hill (Australian writer) (born 1943), Australian historian, poet, journalist and academic
- Barry Hill (American football) (1953–2010), former American football player
- Barry Hill (Antarctica), an ice-free hill just west of the mouth of LaPrade Valley
- Barry Hill (bishop) (born 1979), English Anglican bishop
