= Leave It to Charlie =

British television sitcom, 1978–1980

- Genre: Sitcom
- Written by: H.V. Kershaw; Barry Hill
- Directed by: Eric Prytherch
- Starring: David Roper; Peter Sallis; Gwen Cherrell; Sally Kinghorn; Jean Heywood; David Ross; John Horsley
- Theme music composer: Derek Hilton
- Country of origin: United Kingdom
- Original language: English
- No. of series: 4
- No. of episodes: 26

Production
- Producers: Brian Armstrong; Eric Prytherch
- Production locations: Bolton, Lancashire, England, UK
- Camera setup: Multi-camera
- Running time: 30 minutes
- Production company: Granada Television

Original release
- Network: ITV
- Release: 13 July 1978 – 25 March 1980

Leave it to Charlie is a British television sitcom that was first broadcast on ITV from 1978 to 1980. Starring David Roper and Peter Sallis, the series followed a young man named Charlie Fisher, an agent employed by the Lancastrian Insurance Company, whose well-intentioned deeds are often unsuccessful. The series was produced by Granada Television and broadcast from 13 July 1978 to 25 March 1980.

== Plot ==
Charlie Fisher, a keen young agent, is employed by the Lancastrian Insurance Company in Bolton, Lancashire, owned by Arthur Simister. Although Fisher's deeds are well-intentioned, they invariably backfire one after another.

== Cast ==
=== Main ===
- David Roper as Charlie Fisher
- Peter Sallis as Arthur Simister, Alfred Simister
- Gwen Cherrell as Alice Simister
- Sally Kinghorn as Jennifer Padgett
- Jean Heywood as Florence McGee
- David Ross as Harry Hutchins
- John Horsley as Desmond ffolliott

=== Recurring ===
- Jeannette Wild as Marigold
- Steven Beard as George Harrop
- Felix Bowness as Newsreader (voice), George, Mechanical Voice (voice), Politician's Voice (voice)
- Robert Gillespie as Sergeant Pickersgill
- Arthur Kelly as Fred Bailey, Cyril Haskins
- Josie Lane as Clarice, Mrs Philpotts
- Angela Crow as BeryI Butterworth
- Michael Syers as Hiker, Mr Partridge
- Jane Beaumont as Barmaid

=== Guest ===
- John Cater as Bert
- Philip Jackson as Geoffrey
- John Barrard as Mr Philpotts
- Roy Barraclough as The Other Alice
- Jeremy Bulloch as Boy
- Anne Reid as Mrs Hunnicutt
- Bruce Boa as Glenn Rickenbacker
- John Clive as Andy Kirk

== Episodes ==
The series ran for four series, comprising 26 episodes, on ITV from 13 July 1978 to 25 March 1980. The episodes ran for an approximate duration of 30 minutes. All 26 episodes of this series are fully intact but sadly none of the episodes have been released on VHS, DVD or on any other home media platforms. The series is however available to watch at the British Film Institute, although five episodes are not available to watch from their archive. Additionally, selected episodes are available to view on YouTube.

=== Series 1 (1978) ===
1. "Home Is Where the Heartburn Is" (13 July 1978)
2. "'Arry with a Haitch" (20 July 1978)
3. "Won't You Come Home Fred Bailey?" (27 July 1978)
4. "How to Make Oscar Wilde" (3 August 1978)
5. "Home and Away" (10 August 1978)
6. "Love and Mrs. McGee" (17 August 1978)
7. "Keep It in the Family" (24 August 1978)

=== Series 2 (1979) ===
1. "Money, Money, Money" (10 January 1979)
2. "One of our Typewriters Is Missing" (17 January 1979)
3. "Alice, Whose Art Thou?" (24 January 1979)
4. "Never a Cross Word" (31 January 1979)
5. "Do Sit Down, Mrs. Foster" (21 February 1979)
6. "This Is Our Once-A-Year Day" (28 February 1979)
7. "Moonlight Becomes You" (7 March 1979)

=== Series 3 (1979) ===
1. "World Without Women" (12 April 1979)
2. "Ole Brown Eyes" (19 April 1979)
3. "Guess Who's Coming to Dinner" (26 April 1979)
4. "Strike Me Pink" (10 May 1979)
5. "I'm Just Wild About Harry..." (17 May 1979)
6. "...And Harry's Just Wild About Me" (24 May 1979)

=== Series 4 (1980) ===
1. "The World of Mr. Wellbeloved" (19 February 1980)
2. "The Trouble with Harry" (26 February 1980)
3. "Happy Birthday to Who?" (4 March 1980)
4. "The Ffolliott Experiment" (11 March 1980)
5. "A Star Is Born" (18 March 1980)
6. "The Old Flame" (25 March 1980)

== Production ==
When the series was being filmed, series two and three were commissioned and produced as one thirteen-part run, but upon broadcast, they were broken into two separate series; seven of the episodes were broadcast as series two, while the other six episodes were broadcast as series three.

== See also ==
British sitcom
