= Barry Hill (British writer) =

British television writer

Barry Hill (1937 - 23 February 2019), was a British television scriptwriter and dramatist, best known for his long association with the top rated ITV1 soap opera, Coronation Street, penning some 300 scripts from the 1970s to the 1990s. He previously lived and worked in Australia, writing scripts for TV shows such as Matlock Police.

He also wrote episodes for the last series of Leave it to Charlie.

Hill was also known as a speaker, author, journalist and publisher. His books include The Bits Between the Adverts (a humorous trip through weekly newspaper life in the 60s); So You Want to be a Writer (a practical guide for anyone who aspires to write for television, radio or the press, for profit or pleasure); Congratulations – You're a Senior Citizen (a light-hearted guide to help anyone who has reached the true age of maturity to fulfill their potential as a senior citizen).
