= Geoff Barnes =

Fictional character from the BBC soap opera EastEnders

- EastEnders character
- Portrayed by: David Roper
- Duration: 1994–1995
- First appearance: Episode 971; 9 May 1994
- Last appearance: Episode 1201; 24 October 1995
- Introduced by: Barbara Emile (1994); Corinne Hollingworth (1995)
In-universe information
- Occupation: University lecturer
- Wife: Helen Barnes (backstory)
- Daughters: Felicity Barnes

Geoff Barnes is a fictional character from the BBC soap opera EastEnders, played by David Roper. Geoff made his first appearance on 9 May 1994 and is introduced as a love interest for Michelle Fowler (Susan Tully). Roper was written out of the serial in 1995 and Geoff departed in April 1995. He was then reintroduced for a guest stint between September 1995 and October 1995 to aid Michelle's departure, making his final appearance on 24 October 1995.

== Character creation and development ==
1994 was a "historic" year for EastEnders, as in April a third weekly episode was introduced. Due to the program's increased frequency, a number of new characters were introduced to the regular cast. Among them was Geoff Barnes, a middle-aged lecturer at the University Michelle attended. The character was introduced in May 1994 under executive and series producers Leonard Lewis and Barbara Emile. Yorkshire born actor, David Roper, was cast in the role. Unlike the majority of the other regular characters, Geoff did not live in Walford, but in North London. Geoff formed a friendship with Michelle while assisting her with her University work and this later developed into a romance—a plotline that has been compared to the 1983 film Educating Rita. Michelle was a character who had a history of falling for older men and writer Colin Brake has commented on her relationship with Geoff in the book, EastEnders: The First Ten Years (published in 1994): “For the first time since Den [Watts], Michelle found herself attracted to a much older man. After years of disastrous relationships with men, who can say if she has made the right choice this time?”

Michelle's relationship with Geoff proved to be one of her most enduring. They remained an on-screen couple for roughly 12 months. Storylines mainly focused on the characters class and age differences. Geoff's age was 53 at the time of his introduction, several years older than Michelle's father, Arthur. Geoff deviated considerably from all of Michelle's former partners. He was portrayed as mature, dependable and secure. In an episode that aired in April 1995, Michelle's mother Pauline comments that Geoff is “safe and secure” and a “steadying influence” on Michelle. She adds that Michelle “needs someone like him” as she has had “the most unsuitable boyfriends all her life” and she ought to settle down. Ultimately however, these traits in Geoff were the reason for the destruction of the relationship. Michelle frequently commented that the relationship lacked “passion” and although they planned to marry, Geoff realized that Michelle did not love him and “nobly” finished with her. Geoff remained a regular character for a year, and was eventually written out in April 1995, following his split from Michelle. The character returned for brief stints in September and October 1995, to aid the departure of Susan Tully, who left EastEnders after nearly eleven years playing Michelle.

== Storylines ==
Yorkshire born Geoff is Michelle Fowler's personal tutor at university. When Michelle begins performing badly during her final year, Geoff helps her get back on track. They become friends, which soon develops into a romance. Geoff is nearly 30 years older than Michelle. The age difference is initially a concern for Geoff, but Michelle is not perturbed. She continues seeing him despite objections from her father, Arthur Fowler (Bill Treacher), who grows increasingly antagonized by Geoff's presence. Arthur feels that his paternal role towards Michelle and her daughter Vicki is being superseded by Geoff, and he resents him because of this. Geoff is divorced and has three grown children, including a daughter named Felicity (Tara Moran). Felicity turns out to be an obnoxious snob and there is a clear class divide between her and Michelle. Felicity frequently goads Michelle about her past and for dating a middle-aged man. There is an underlying hostility every time they met.

Later in the year, Geoff supports Pat Butcher (Pam St Clement) through a troublesome period, and subsequently becomes the object of her affections. Out of sympathy, Geoff takes an interest in Pat's affairs, and even persuades her to take an evening course in business studies. Pat soon begins to think that Geoff is interested in her sexually, but Geoff seems oblivious to her advances. Gossip begins to spread about the nature of their relationship and at this time Geoff decides to let Pat down gently. However, he is beaten to it by Pat who senses the on-coming rejection and announces − to Geoff's surprise − that they should no longer see each other socially. In 1995, Geoff is offered a new job in Scotland. He asks Michelle to marry him, hoping that she and Vicki will join him there. Michelle is hesitant and Arthur reacts with fury − denouncing their relationship as “unnatural”. However, Arthur's extreme opposition only encourages Michelle to go against his wishes. Although Michelle claims to love Geoff, she worries that their relationship lacks passion. After weeks of contemplation, she is finally persuaded to accept by her nemesis Grant Mitchell (Ross Kemp), who goads her about her boring life in Walford. Geoff − who has already prepared himself for rejection − is stunned and thrilled when she agrees to marry him.

In April, Geoff and Michelle travel to Scotland to view their new home. Michelle does not seem particularly happy, which Geoff picks upon. Michelle's mother, Pauline (Wendy Richard), unwittingly makes the situation worse when she praises Geoff for being safe and secure, unlike Michelle's other boyfriends. He begins to realize that Michelle finds him dull and boring. After a bout of heavy contemplation, he tells Michelle that getting married would be a mistake because she does not love him enough. Michelle argues that affection and respect are more important than passionate love, but Geoff refuses to allow her to waste her life on a loveless marriage. They part company and Geoff remains in Scotland. He returns to Walford unexpectedly in September, to see if Michelle is interested in taking a job as a research assistant in America with one of his colleagues. Geoff admits that he still loves Michelle. They spend the night together and talk about reconciling. Michelle remains unsure and tells him that she needs time to think it over. She eventually opts against a reconciliation with Geoff and takes the job in America instead. Geoff leaves Walford with a broken heart in October 1995; Michelle leaves Walford shortly after becoming pregnant with Grant Mitchell's child.
