= David Roper (actor) =

British film and television actor (born 1944)

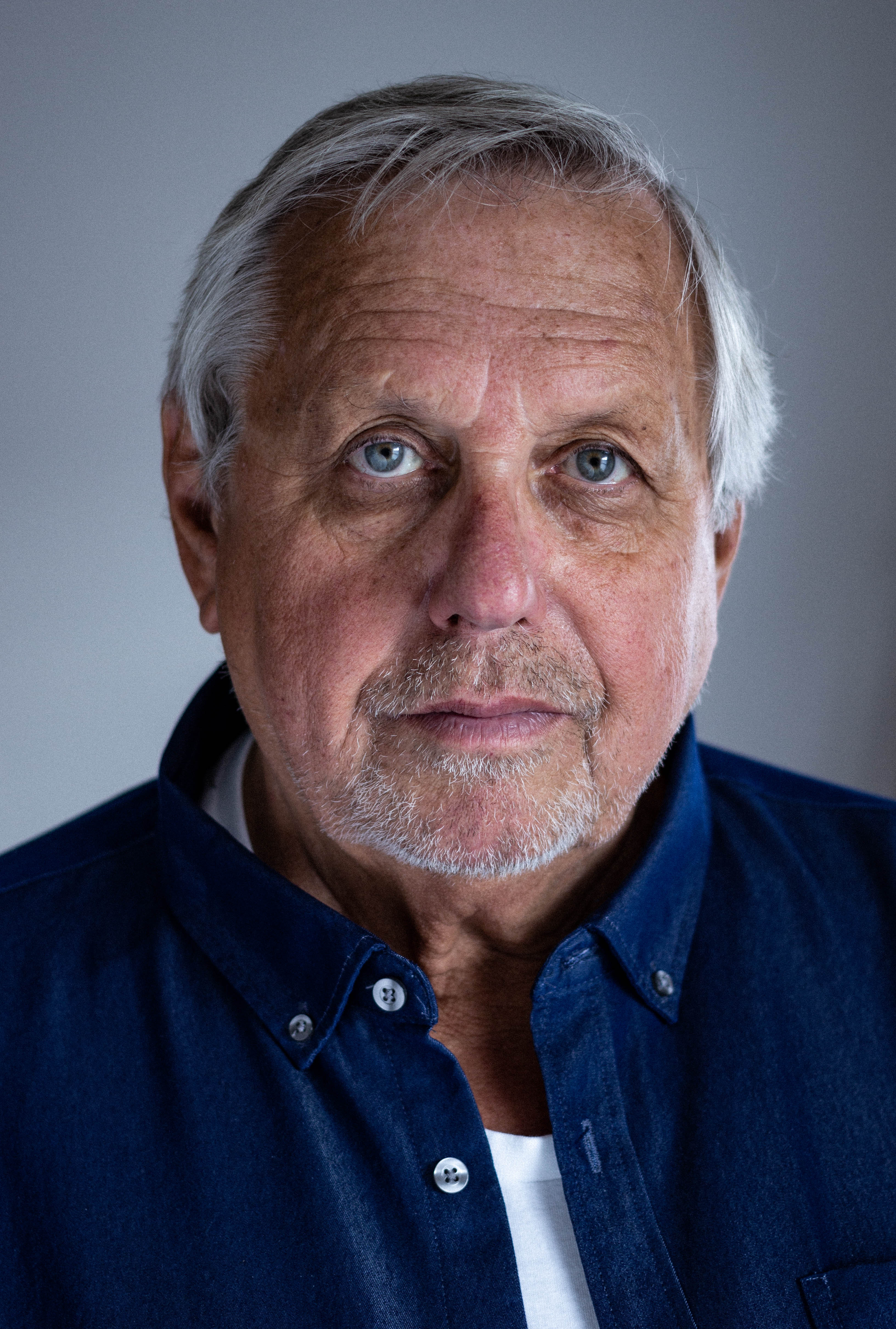
- Headshot taken by Jack Roper
- Born: 20 June 1944 (age 82); Bradford, West Riding of Yorkshire, England, UK
- Occupation: Actor
- Years active: 1974–present

David Roper (born 20 June 1944 in Bradford, West Riding of Yorkshire) is a British film and television actor, best known for his roles in The Cuckoo Waltz and Leave it to Charlie. Later, he played Geoff Barnes in EastEnders (1994–1995) and Bob Bradshaw in Coronation Street in 2000.

== Other credits ==
- The Cuckoo Waltz (1975)
- Aces High (1976)
- A Bit of a Do season 1 episode 3 (1989)
- Stanley's Dragon 1994 film, role – Inspector Walsh
- Downtime 1997 film – Detective
- Heartbeat Series Eight, Episode 115 (episode 13) "Forbidden Fruit", 29 November 1998 – Detective Inspector Randall
- London's Burning Series 12, Episode 5 – A. D. O. Fearnley
- Midsomer Murders Series 11, Episode 64 "The Magician's Nephew", 27 July 2008
- Holby City, Series 21, Episode 32 "When Worlds Collide", 6 August 2019
- Doctors, "The Courier", 13 May 2020 – Brian Hershey

== Personal life ==
Roper is married and has twin boys, Harry and Jack. In December 2020, Roper released his own documentary book, The Baby Trail, which was about the emotional and physical journey he and his wife Andrea went through to become parents. It chronicles their seven-year struggle with infertility, the ups and downs of IVF treatments, and the deeply personal moments leading to the birth of their sons in 1995.
