= List of EastEnders characters introduced in 2017 =

EastEnders logo

EastEnders is a BBC soap opera that first aired on 19 February 1985. The following is a list of characters that first appeared in 2017, by order of first appearance. All characters are introduced by the show's executive producer Sean O'Connor or, from 27 November, his successor as executive consultant, John Yorke.

The first character to be introduced was Keegan Baker (Zack Morris), a friend of Shakil Kazemi (Shaheen Jafargholi), followed by Emerald Fox (Doña Croll), the mother of Denise Fox (Diane Parish) and Kim Fox-Hubbard (Tameka Empson). Madison Drake (Seraphina Beh), Alexandra D'Costa (Sydney Craven) and Travis Law-Hughes (Alex James-Phelps), three new teenage characters, were also introduced in January as well as their school teacher Mr Gethin Pryce (Cerith Flinn) and Hugo Browning (Simon Williams), the chairman of Weyland & Co. The following month, Preston Cooper (Martin Anzor), a student with whom Michelle Fowler (Jenna Russell) had an illegal relationship in the United States, and Konrad Topolski (Piotr Baumann), a love interest for Shirley Carter (Linda Henry), made their first appearances.

Josh Hemmings (Eddie Eyre), the son of James Willmott-Brown (William Boyde) and love interest for Lauren Branning (Jacqueline Jossa), and Tommy, a friend of Jay Brown (Jamie Borthwick), both debuted in March. April sees the first appearance of Woody Woodward (Lee Ryan), a friend of the Carters'. Ted Murray (Christopher Timothy) and Joyce Murray (Maggie Steed), an elderly couple, made their first appearances in May. The following month, Tom Bailey (Daniel Casey), a love interest for Michelle, the Taylor family − comprising Karen Taylor (Lorraine Stanley), Keanu Taylor (Danny Walters), Bernadette Taylor (Clair Norris), Riley Taylor (Tom Jacobs) and Chatham Taylor (Alfie Jacobs) − and Ingrid Solberg (Pernille Broch), a nanny hired by Jack Branning (Scott Maslen), were introduced. Felix Moore (George Maguire), a market trader, debuted in July. Hope Fowler, the daughter of Martin Fowler (James Bye) and Stacey Fowler (Lacey Turner), was born in October. Aidan Maguire (Patrick Bergin) arrived in November, while Kandice Taylor (Hannah Spearritt), Karen's sister, and Abi Branning, the daughter of Abi Branning (Lorna Fitzgerald) and Steven Beale (Aaron Sidwell), made their first appearance in December.

== Keegan Baker ==
Keegan Butcher-Baker (also Baker), played by Zack Morris, is a friend of Shakil Kazemi (Shaheen Jafargholi) who also goes to school with Louise Mitchell (Tilly Keeper), Bex Fowler (Jasmine Armfield), Travis Law-Hughes (Alex James-Phelps), Alexandra D'Costa (Sydney Craven) and Madison Drake (Seraphina Beh). He first appears in the episode broadcast on 9 January 2017. On 23 February 2022, it was announced that Morris would be leaving his role as Keegan with his exit scenes set to air in the spring. Keegan departed on 17 March 2022, alongside his wife Tiffany Butcher (Maisie Smith).

== Emerald Fox ==
Emerald Fox
- EastEnders character
- Portrayed by: Doña Croll
- First appearance: Episode 5424; 13 January 2017
- Last appearance: Episode 5436; 6 February 2017
- Introduced by: Sean O'Connor
In-universe information
- Other names: Ada Fox
- Daughters: Denise Fox; Kim Fox; Daphne Fox
- Grandsons: Raymond Fox; Mica Fox
- Granddaughters: Chelsea Fox; Libby Fox; Pearl Fox
- Other relatives: Jordan Fox

Emerald Fox, played by Doña Croll, is the mother of Denise Fox (Diane Parish) and Kim Fox-Hubbard (Tameka Empson). Her introduction to the series was revealed on 1 January 2017, in a trailer for upcoming storylines. It was revealed the character would be appearing in "a handful of episodes". The character was previously referred to in the series as "Ada", though in the 5 January 2017 episode, Denise asks if her mother is "still calling herself [Emerald]", implying that it is a nickname, rather than the character's name being changed.

Emerald and Kim arrive at the hospital for the birth of Denise's son, Raymond. Kim finds out Denise has decided to keep the adoption plans for him and both Emerald and Kim are upset with her. Emerald researches adoption, and is pleased to learn that Denise is allowed to change her mind. Emerald tells Patrick Trueman (Rudolph Walker), Denise and Kim's surrogate father, about what she would have to do to stop the adoption and he advises her to support Denise. Kim decides to cut all ties with Denise as a result of the adoption and when Emerald stands by Denise, Kim angrily throws her mother out leaving Emerald no choice but to move in with Denise, Libby and Patrick.

When a bus crashes into the market and viaduct, Emerald is relieved to learn that Denise has survived the crash with minor injuries. Emerald catches Keegan Baker (Zack Morris) shoplifting at the local shop where Denise works whilst everyone is in chaos rescuing the injured, and attempts to stop him but he pushes her against the shelves. Emerald tells Kim's husband, Vincent Hubbard (Richard Blackwood), that Kim's behaviour is unreasonable and Kim throws her out, so she moves in with Denise. Before Emerald leaves Walford, Denise defends Kim to Emerald and Kim says she is thankful for her sister, to which Emerald states that they are not sisters. When pushed for more information, Emerald reveals that Denise was brought to her as a baby and she felt she had no choice but to raise her as her own. Emerald says she is still Denise's mother and then leaves. Over a year later, Kim and Denise take a DNA test, which reveals that they are biological sisters and that Emerald lied.

== Raymond Fox ==
Raymond Fox
- EastEnders character
- Portrayed by: Uncredited (2017); Michael Jose Pomares Calixte (2020–present)
- Duration: 2017, 2020–present
- First appearance: Episode 5424; 13 January 2017
- Introduced by: Sean O'Connor (2017); Jon Sen (2020)
In-universe information
- Other names: Raymond Dawkins
- Family: Mitchell
- Father: Phil Mitchell
- Mother: Denise Fox
- Adoptive father: Jonah Dawkins
- Adoptive mother: Lydia Dawkins
- Stepfather: Jack Branning
- Stepmother: Sharon Watts; Kat Slater
- Half-brothers: Ben Mitchell; Albie Watts; Dennis Rickman Jnr (adoptive)
- Half-sisters: Chelsea Fox; Libby Fox; Louise Mitchell
- Grandmothers: Peggy Mitchell; Emerald Fox; Ellie Nixon (adoptive)
- Uncles: Grant Mitchell
- Aunts: Sam Mitchell; Kim Fox; Daphne Fox
- Nephews: Jordan Fox
- Nieces: Lexi Pearce; Peggy Mitchell Jnr
- First cousins: Mark Fowler Jnr; Courtney Mitchell; Ricky Branning; Pearl Fox; Mica Fox
- Other relatives: Amy Mitchell; Charli Slater

Raymond Fox (also Dawkins) first appears in the episode broadcast on 13 January 2017. He is the son of established characters Denise Fox (Diane Parish) and Phil Mitchell (Steve McFadden). In 2020, Raymond returned to the serial following the death of his adoptive parents in a car accident. Since 2020, he has been played by Michael Jose Pomares Calixte.

Raymond was conceived when Denise had a drunken one-night stand with Phil, who was battling with cirrhosis of the liver from his battle with alcoholism. Denise puts him up for adoption immediately after his birth, visiting him in his cot and telling him her reasons. The next day, Phil finds out he is the father after his wife Sharon Mitchell (Letitia Dean) overheard Denise telling Phil's ex-girlfriend Shirley Carter (Linda Henry). Denise tells him their ages and lifestyles would make them bad parents, and that adoption is the best thing for the baby. Phil finds his son and holds him, but then leaves the hospital, having accepted Denise's decision. Social worker Trish Barnes (Tessa Churchard) visits Denise a few weeks later to inform her how her son is doing with his potential adoptive family and that he has been named Raymond after Ray Charles as the parents are a fan of his. Denise later reads a letter from his adoptive parents informing her that Raymond is living a happy life with them. Months later, Denise gets confirmation that the adoption has been finalised. Denise gives Phil the letter about Raymond's progress. When Phil gets an offer for some land he owns, he tells Sharon that he would like to provide for Raymond. In July, Phil's eldest son, Ben Mitchell (Harry Reid), is angry when he finds out about Raymond. Raymond has been mentioned by Phil on some occasions. In September 2020, Raymond is involved in a car accident along with his adoptive parents and sister. Denise visits Raymond in hospital and meets Raymond's adoptive grandmother, Ellie Nixon (Mica Paris).

As part of Phil's alcoholism storyline, in April 2016, he has a one-night stand with Denise after being estranged from his wife, Sharon; the "unlikely pair" are brought together by parenting issues. The one-night stand leads to a "much bigger plan" when Denise finds out she is pregnant with Phil's baby. It was reported that this would "spark a huge storyline" due to the "hatred" expressed between them. When it was reported that Denise would opt for adoption, Kim would make the plan "increasingly complicated" when she offers to adopt the baby. Phil discovers he is the father of the baby because Sharon feels she "has been left with no option but to tell" Phil as she wants to give him the option of meeting his child.

== Madison Drake ==
Madison Drake
- EastEnders character
- Portrayed by: Seraphina Beh
- First appearance: Episode 5426; 17 January 2017
- Last appearance: Episode 5532; 21 July 2017
- Introduced by: Sean O'Connor
In-universe information
- Occupation: Student

Madison Drake, played by Seraphina Beh, is a school friend of Louise Mitchell (Tilly Keeper). She first appears in the episode broadcast on 17 January 2017, and made her final appearance in the episode broadcast on 21 July 2017. Beh's casting in EastEnders was announced on Twitter by her management, Hero Talent Group.

Madison and Alexadnra D'Costa (Sydney Craven) attend the drama club at Walford High School with Louise. They are both unfriendly towards her when Louise tries to speak to them. When Travis Law-Hughes (Alex James-Phelps) greets Louise, they tease her when they notice she has a crush on him. They tell Louise's friend Bex Fowler (Jasmine Armfield) that they have treated Louise better than she has, following her teasing over the recent bus crash and advise Louise to get her own back. Alexandra and Madison help Louise come up with a plan to get revenge on Shakil Kazemi (Shaheen Jafargholi) and Keegan Baker (Zack Morris), who have teased Louise about how scared she was during the crash, and Louise inadvertently shows them a naked photo that Shakil sent to Bex. Under Madison and Alexandra's instruction, Louise gets Bex's phone and sends Shakil's naked photo to them and Bex is left distressed when she finds out what Louise did and that the photo has been sent to another person.

Bex receives an anonymous Valentine's card and believes Shakil sent it, however, realises that Madison and Alexandra sent it as a joke. Shakil tells Louise that he has seen Bex and Travis together and Madison and Alexandra tell Louise they believe Bex has been after Travis for a while, causing Louise to confront Bex, but Bex insists they are just friends. After finding out Bex has had sex with Preston Cooper (Martin Anzor), Madison and Alexandra spread it around online. When a porn video with Bex's face imposed in the model's body is sent around school (created by Keegan in revenge for Shakil's photo being distributed), the police get involved and the explicit photo of Shakil is discovered and Bex takes the blame. After Bex is told she will be interviewed under caution, she tells Louise she will admit the truth, so Louise confesses that Madison and Alexandra were responsible for sending it on and she should think about bringing them into it. After being given a warning, Bex tells Madison, Alexandra and Louise she took the blame despite being the only innocent person, and they laugh at her.

Madison and Alexandra overhear Bex insult them when she confronts Louise over their friendship. In the toilets, Madison and Alexandra push Bex, Madison tears her shirt and Alexandra writes "dirty" on her face while Louise stands outside. Bex then admits to the headteacher, Mrs Robyn Lund (Polly Highton), and teacher Mr Gethin Pryce (Cerith Flinn), that Louise, Madison and Alexandra were responsible for sending the photo, but they deny knowledge of either incident. Madison and Alexandra go to Louise's half-brother's, Ben Mitchell's (Harry Reid), 21st birthday party and Jay Brown (Jamie Borthwick) chats Madison up. When Jay's ex-girlfriend, Star Bragg (Amy-Leigh Hickman), turns up, he orders her to leave and she tells him that Madison and Alexandra are underage. Madison and Alexandra are forced to leave. When Bex works alongside her aunt Michelle Fowler (Jenna Russell) in the café, Madison and Alexandra make remarks about them both being with Preston and laugh when Bex shouts at Michelle. When Alexandra sees Bex in the local shop, she knocks the sugar she is buying out of her hands and sticks chewing gum in her hair when she goes to pick it up. Later, Bex goes to the café where her great-aunt Kathy Beale (Gillian Taylforth) asks her to serve Alexandra and Madison their drinks; they insult her and Alexandra trips Bex, causing Kathy to spill soup on Madison. They leave and order Louise to come with them. They later find Bex in the local chicken shop and Madison tells Bex that she owes her a new top, and Alexandra insults Bex's weight. They then tell Bex that they will always be around and she cannot escape them. Later, Louise, Alexandra and Madison arrive at Bex's house and her stepmother, Stacey Fowler (Lacey Turner), lets them in, where Alexandra threatens to smash Bex's guitar. Louise tries to stop her from doing it but Alexandra stamps on the guitar, leaving Bex in bits.

The next day, Madison apologises to Bex, saying that she is no longer involved with Alexandra and warns her that Alexandra is planning to cut her hair. Later the same day, Alexandra and Louise tell Bex that they are planning revenge on Madison, so Bex warns Madison of this; Madison thanks her and they meet up, where Madison offers her truffles. As Bex is revulsed by the taste, Alexandra and Louise emerge, filming Bex's reaction, saying it was cat faeces. Bex later watches a video they posted online of them making the fake truffle from mud and showing Bex's reaction. Bex's mother Sonia Fowler (Natalie Cassidy) reports Bex's bullying to the school but keeps Louise's name out of it on Bex's request.

Bex and Louise try to fix their friendship after Louise agrees to no longer be friends with Madison and Alexandra, but later they bump into Madison and Alexandra, and Louise says she is only talking to Bex and they are not friends again, so Bex leaves, upset. Madison and Alexandra tell Louise they have to report to Mrs Lund every day because of her, and then agree with each other that she has disrespected them and must not get away with it. Madison and Alexandra take Louise's school books and hide them, but later return them to her after she gets detention. This causes Louise to miss a drama rehearsal and they tell her she cannot miss another one or she will be unable to take part in a talent show.

When Michelle starts community service, Louise, Madison and Alexandra tease her. Madison and Alexandra graffiti "cougar" on a wall, targeted at Michelle. They tell Louise she could have a chance at going out with Travis, and though she says Alexandra is more his type, they laugh at Louise's crush when she leaves the room. Later, when Louise's stepmother, Sharon Mitchell (Letitia Dean) and Michelle get home drunk, Alexandra and Madison are amused when Louise berates them and tells them how alcohol has affected her family, so they decide to use it against her. Madison and Alexandra talk about a party they have arranged at Madison's, but later tell Louise that Madison cannot host it and they suggest a girls' night for the three of them at Louise's home, which Sharon agrees to. Madison and Alexandra invite Travis to the party, overheard by Bex. Bex tries to warn Louise that Madison and Alexandra cannot be trusted but Louise just accuses her of jealousy. Madison and Alexandra arrive at Louise's with vodka and people later start arriving, including Keegan and Travis, and Louise frets about alcohol in the house, but Madison and Alexandra reassure Louise that they will make non-alcoholic drinks for the three of them. Louise unknowingly has drinks that Madison and Alexandra spiked, resulting in Louise getting drunk. Madison and Alexandra take selfies with Louise when she is too drunk to know about it. Louise is sick and as she staggers outside, she collapses after bringing up blood, panicking Madison, Alexandra, Keegan, Travis and Bex.

Louise is taken to hospital with paralysis and when she is sent home, Madison and Alexandra turn up and they tell her that Keegan filmed what happened and was going to post it online but they stopped him, and they tell Louise, Sharon and Ben that Travis was responsible for spiking her drink. Louise believes Travis could have been framed, but Madison and Alexandra convince her that he is lying. After speaking to Sharon's son Dennis Rickman Jnr (Bleu Landau), about the party on Travis's behalf, Bex tells Louise that Alexandra followed Travis into the kitchen, and Alexandra interrupts them. Alexandra gets herself out of trouble by telling Louise and Bex that Travis may not have been responsible for spiking her drink and Louise insists that Madison and Alexandra are still her friends, but Bex worries that they have targeted Louise.

Sharon wants to meet Travis, inviting him for dinner, but Louise calls it off when Madison and Alexandra plant doubts that Travis is a cheat. Keegan tells Louise that they had sex at the party, but Louise says he is lying, but worries after Madison and Alexandra tell her that Keegan is telling people about Louise's birthmark. Madison and Alexandra then tell Louise that Keegan has chlamydia and he gave it to another student. When Travis breaks up with Louise, Madison and Alexandra tell him that he did the right thing.

When Louise decides to pull out of the school showcase, Alexandra asks Travis to sign her up to replace Louise as Juliet in Romeo and Juliet, and later Alexandra tells Louise that she is now playing the part but only because Mr Pryce was desperate and she did not really want it. Bex tells Louise that Alexandra is lying but Louise believes Alexandra. During rehearsal, Alexandra's acting is wooden but she confidentially kisses Travis, though Mr Pryce tells her she should act shy. Alexandra overhears Bex telling Shakil that Alexandra will mess up in the showcase so decides to take revenge.

Before Bex's performance at the showcase, Madison and Alexandra break a guitar string and when Bex looks for one in the classroom, Madison and Alexandra pin Bex up against a wall. Shakil hears the bullying through headphones and intentionally turns up the volume through the soundboard for everyone to hear; exposing them. Alexandra and Madison are publicly shamed and humiliated after Louise smugly tells them that they are caught out. They are then angrily ordered by Mrs Lund to her office. Louise and Bex make statements against Alexandra and Madison to Mrs Lund and Louise realises what they are really like. Madison and Alexandra receive external exclusions and are banned from the school prom. Alexandra asks Keegan for help to ruin the prom. Madison and Alexandra watch the prom from the balcony. Travis arranges an area behind the stage with candles for him and Louise. Alexandra and Madison turn up and Louise berates them and their actions and Alexandra pushes Louise onto lit candles, setting off the fire alarms and sprinklers. Louise is in agony as Mr Pryce and other students help her by cooling the burns with water. Keegan is sickened by Madison and Alexandra's actions and drags them onto the stage, where Alexandra denies it being their fault. The police arrive to get statements where Madison and Alexandra turn against each other as Alexandra tries to blame Madison. Madison and Alexandra are both arrested for GBH and students insult the pair as they are escorted out. Mr Pryce visits Bex and Sonia and tells them that Madison and Alexandra will be prosecuted. A few days later, Sharon finds out that they have both been expelled from school.

Madison were called "mean girls" by a writer for What's on TV?, while Duncan Lindsay from the Metro said they are not as "trustworthy" as they seem. Lindsay also said that through the young characters, EastEnders "is nailing the representation of the various young characters you find in school environments" and that Beh and Craven "are doing a commendable job with those bitchy characters." Their revenge plan against Shakil was called "spiteful" by Sophie Dainty from Digital Spy. When Madison and Alexandra began to bully Louise while still pretending they were friends, they spiked Louise's drinks at a party resulting in her collapsing, they were described as "vicious" and "evil teens." Beh and Craven hinted that the backstories of their characters could be explored, saying "there's a reason why" their characters are the way they are as "most people who have that kind of lifestyle tend to have a reason behind it."

== Alexandra D'Costa ==
Alexandra D'Costa
- EastEnders character
- Portrayed by: Sydney Craven
- First appearance: Episode 5426; 17 January 2017
- Last appearance: Episode 5532; 21 July 2017
- Introduced by: Sean O'Connor
In-universe information
- Occupation: Student

Alexandra D'Costa, played by Sydney Craven, is a school friend of Louise Mitchell (Tilly Keeper). She first appears in the episode broadcast on 17 January 2017, and made her final appearance in the episode broadcast on 21 July 2017. Laura-Jayne Tyler of Inside Soap dubbed Alexandra the "vilest villain in soap right now", and added "No one has us screaming more abuse at the telly!" Tyler later said Alexandra was "a vicious, spiteful girl... but she has a spark about her." She compared the character to a young Tiffany Mitchell (Martine McCutcheon) and hoped she might be redeemed in the future.

Alexandra and Madison Drake (Seraphina Beh) attend the drama club at Walford High School with Louise. They are both unfriendly towards her when Louise tries to speak to them. When Travis Law-Hughes (Alex James-Phelps) greets Louise, they tease her when they notice she has a crush on him. They tell Louise's friend Bex Fowler (Jasmine Armfield) that they have treated Louise better than she has, following her teasing over the recent bus crash and advise Louise to get her own back. Alexandra and Madison help Louise come up with a plan to get revenge on Shakil Kazemi (Shaheen Jafargholi) and Keegan Baker (Zack Morris), who have teased Louise about how scared she was during the crash, and Louise inadvertently shows them a naked photo that Shakil sent to Bex. Under Madison and Alexandra's instruction, Louise gets Bex's phone and sends Shakil's naked photo to them and Bex is left distressed when she finds out what Louise did and that the photo has been sent to another person.

Bex receives an anonymous Valentine's card and believes Shakil sent it, however, realises that Madison and Alexandra sent it as a joke. Shakil tells Louise that he has seen Bex and Travis together and Madison and Alexandra tell Louise they believe Bex has been after Travis for a while, causing Louise to confront Bex, but Bex insists they are just friends. After finding out Bex has had sex with Preston Cooper (Martin Anzor), Madison and Alexandra spread it around online. When a porn video with Bex's face imposed in the model's body is sent around school (created by Keegan in revenge for Shakil's photo being distributed), the police get involved and the explicit photo of Shakil is discovered and Bex takes the blame. After Bex is told she will be interviewed under caution, she tells Louise she will admit the truth, so Louise confesses that Madison and Alexandra were responsible for sending it on and she should think about bringing them into it. After being given a warning, Bex tells Madison, Alexandra and Louise she took the blame despite being the only innocent person, and they laugh at her.

Madison and Alexandra overhear Bex insult them when she confronts Louise over their friendship. In the toilets, Madison and Alexandra push Bex, Madison tears her shirt and Alexandra writes "dirty" on her face while Louise stands outside. Bex then admits to the headteacher, Mrs Robyn Lund (Polly Highton), and teacher Mr Gethin Pryce (Cerith Flinn), that Louise, Madison and Alexandra were responsible for sending the photo, but they deny knowledge of either incident. Madison and Alexandra go to Louise's half-brother's, Ben Mitchell's (Harry Reid), 21st birthday party and Jay Brown (Jamie Borthwick) chats Madison up. When Jay's ex-girlfriend, Star Bragg (Amy-Leigh Hickman), turns up, he orders her to leave and she tells him that Madison and Alexandra are underage. Madison and Alexandra are forced to leave. When Bex works alongside her aunt Michelle Fowler (Jenna Russell) in the café, Madison and Alexandra make remarks about them both being with Preston and laugh when Bex shouts at Michelle. When Alexandra sees Bex in the local shop, she knocks the sugar she is buying out of her hands and sticks chewing gum in her hair when she goes to pick it up. Later, Bex goes to the café where her great-aunt Kathy Beale (Gillian Taylforth) asks her to serve Alexandra and Madison their drinks; they insult her and Alexandra trips Bex, causing Kathy to spill soup on Madison. They leave and order Louise to come with them. They later find Bex in the local chicken shop and Madison tells Bex that she owes her a new top, and Alexandra insults Bex's weight. They then tell Bex that they will always be around and she cannot escape them. Later, Louise, Alexandra and Madison arrive at Bex's house and her stepmother, Stacey Fowler (Lacey Turner), lets them in, where Alexandra threatens to smash Bex's guitar. Louise tries to stop her from doing it but Alexandra stamps on the guitar, leaving Bex in bits.

The next day, Madison apologises to Bex, saying that she is no longer involved with Alexandra and warns her that Alexandra is planning to cut her hair. Later the same day, Alexandra and Louise tell Bex that they are planning revenge on Madison, so Bex warns Madison of this; Madison thanks her and they meet up, where Madison offers her truffles. As Bex is revulsed by the taste, Alexandra and Louise emerge, filming Bex's reaction, saying it was cat faeces. Bex later watches a video they posted online of them making the fake truffle from mud and showing Bex's reaction. Bex's mother Sonia Fowler (Natalie Cassidy) reports Bex's bullying to the school but keeps Louise's name out of it on Bex's request.

Bex and Louise try to fix their friendship after Louise agrees to no longer be friends with Madison and Alexandra, but later they bump into Madison and Alexandra, and Louise says she is only talking to Bex and they are not friends again, so Bex leaves, upset. Madison and Alexandra tell Louise they have to report to Mrs Lund every day because of her, and then agree with each other that she has disrespected them and must not get away with it. Madison and Alexandra take Louise's school books and hide them, but later return them to her after she gets detention. This causes Louise to miss a drama rehearsal and they tell her she cannot miss another one or she will be unable to take part in a talent show.

When Michelle starts community service, Louise, Madison and Alexandra tease her. Madison and Alexandra graffiti "cougar" on a wall, targeted at Michelle. They tell Louise she could have a chance at going out with Travis, and though she says Alexandra is more his type, they laugh at Louise's crush when she leaves the room. Later, when Louise's stepmother, Sharon Mitchell (Letitia Dean) and Michelle get home drunk, Alexandra and Madison are amused when Louise berates them and tells them how alcohol has affected her family, so they decide to use it against her. Madison and Alexandra talk about a party they have arranged at Madison's, but later tell Louise that Madison cannot host it and they suggest a girls' night for the three of them at Louise's home, which Sharon agrees to. Madison and Alexandra invite Travis to the party, overheard by Bex. Bex tries to warn Louise that Madison and Alexandra cannot be trusted but Louise just accuses her of jealousy. Madison and Alexandra arrive at Louise's with vodka and people later start arriving, including Keegan and Travis, and Louise frets about alcohol in the house, but Madison and Alexandra reassure Louise that they will make non-alcoholic drinks for the three of them. Louise unknowingly has drinks that Madison and Alexandra spiked, resulting in Louise getting drunk. Madison and Alexandra take selfies with Louise when she is too drunk to know about it. Louise is sick and as she staggers outside, she collapses after bringing up blood, panicking Madison, Alexandra, Keegan, Travis and Bex.

Louise is taken to hospital with paralysis and when she is sent home, Madison and Alexandra turn up and they tell her that Keegan filmed what happened and was going to post it online but they stopped him, and they tell Louise, Sharon and Ben that Travis was responsible for spiking her drink. Louise believes Travis could have been framed, but Madison and Alexandra convince her that he is lying. After speaking to Sharon's son Dennis Rickman Jnr (Bleu Landau), about the party on Travis's behalf, Bex tells Louise that Alexandra followed Travis into the kitchen, and Alexandra interrupts them. Alexandra gets herself out of trouble by telling Louise and Bex that Travis may not have been responsible for spiking her drink and Louise insists that Madison and Alexandra are still her friends, but Bex worries that they have targeted Louise.

Sharon wants to meet Travis, inviting him for dinner, but Louise calls it off when Madison and Alexandra plant doubts that Travis is a cheat. Keegan tells Louise that they had sex at the party, but Louise says he is lying, but worries after Madison and Alexandra tell her that Keegan is telling people about Louise's birthmark. Madison and Alexandra then tell Louise that Keegan has chlamydia and he gave it to another student. When Travis breaks up with Louise, Madison and Alexandra tell him that he did the right thing.

When Louise decides to pull out of the school showcase, Alexandra asks Travis to sign her up to replace Louise as Juliet in Romeo and Juliet, and later Alexandra tells Louise that she is now playing the part but only because Mr Pryce was desperate and she did not really want it. Bex tells Louise that Alexandra is lying but Louise believes Alexandra. During rehearsal, Alexandra's acting is wooden but she confidentially kisses Travis, though Mr Pryce tells her she should act shy. Alexandra overhears Bex telling Shakil that Alexandra will mess up in the showcase so decides to take revenge.

Before Bex's performance at the showcase, Madison and Alexandra break a guitar string and when Bex looks for one in the classroom, Madison and Alexandra pin Bex up against a wall. Shakil hears the bullying through headphones and intentionally turns up the volume through the soundboard for everyone to hear; exposing them. Alexandra and Madison are publicly shamed and humiliated after Louise smugly tells them that they are caught out. They are then angrily ordered by Mrs Lund to her office. Louise and Bex make statements against Alexandra and Madison to Mrs Lund and Louise realises what they are really like. Madison and Alexandra receive external exclusions and are banned from the school prom. Alexandra asks Keegan for help to ruin the prom. Madison and Alexandra watch the prom from the balcony. Travis arranges an area behind the stage with candles for him and Louise. Alexandra and Madison turn up and Louise berates them and their actions and Alexandra pushes Louise onto lit candles, setting off the fire alarms and sprinklers. Louise is in agony as Mr Pryce and other students help her by cooling the burns with water. Keegan is sickened by Madison and Alexandra's actions and drags them onto the stage, where Alexandra denies it being their fault. The police arrive to get statements where Madison and Alexandra turn against each other as Alexandra tries to blame Madison. Madison and Alexandra are both arrested for GBH and students insult the pair as they are escorted out. Mr Pryce visits Bex and Sonia and tells them that Madison and Alexandra will be prosecuted. A few days later, Sharon finds out that they have both been expelled from school.

Alexandra and Madison were called "mean girls" by a writer for What's on TV?, while Duncan Lindsay from the Metro said they are not as "trustworthy" as they seem. Lindsay also said that through the young characters, EastEnders "is nailing the representation of the various young characters you find in school environments" and that Beh and Craven "are doing a commendable job with those bitchy characters." Their revenge plan against Shakil was called "spiteful" by Sophie Dainty from Digital Spy. When Madison and Alexandra began to bully Louise while still pretending they were friends, they spiked Louise's drinks at a party resulting in her collapsing, they were described as "vicious" and "evil teens." Beh and Craven hinted that the backstories of their characters could be explored, saying "there's a reason why" their characters are the way they are as "most people who have that kind of lifestyle tend to have a reason behind it."

== Travis Law-Hughes ==
Travis Law-Hughes
- EastEnders character
- Portrayed by: Alex James-Phelps
- First appearance: Episode 5426; 17 January 2017
- Last appearance: Episode 5591; 2 November 2017
- Introduced by: Sean O'Connor
In-universe information
- Occupation: Student

Travis Law-Hughes played by Alex James-Phelps, is a friend of Louise Mitchell (Tilly Keeper). He first appears in the episode broadcast on 17 January 2017, and makes his final appearance in the episode broadcast on 2 November 2017.

Travis is a student who attends drama club at Walford High School with Louise. He later assists her when her can of drink is stuck in the vending machine. Louise takes a liking to him and he later texts Louise for a date. Louise waits for Travis, however, it turns out she was set up by Keegan Baker (Zack Morris) and his friends. Travis later greets Louise, but she doesn't respond to him. Louise's friend Bex Fowler (Jasmine Armfield) invites him to her house for guitar lessons. Bex's former boyfriend Shakil Kazemi (Shaheen Jafargholi) becomes convinced they are a couple. Madison Drake and Alexandra D'Costa (Seraphina Beh and Sydney Craven) tell Louise that Bex has been after Travis for a while. Louise confronts Bex but she insists they are just friends. Louise, Madison and Alexandra see Travis and Bex hanging out together and they show Travis their nails. Travis and Bex go for food and Travis tells Louise that he'll see her at school. Madison and Alexandra invite Travis to a party at Louise's house and Travis agrees to go, unaware that Bex overheard the conversation. Travis arrives at Louise's house for a party that Madison and Alexandra arranged, and Louise unknowingly has drinks that Madison and Alexandra spiked, resulting in her getting drunk and being sick. A concerned Travis tells Bex that Louise needs her, and he watches as she collapses.

The next day, Madison and Alexandra tell Louise, her stepmother Sharon Mitchell (Letitia Dean) and half-brother Ben Mitchell (Harry Reid) that Travis was responsible for spiking her drink. Louise believes Travis when he says he could have been framed, but Madison and Alexandra convince Louise that he is lying. Bex speaks to Louise's step-brother, Dennis Rickman Jnr (Bleu Landau), about the party on Travis's behalf. When Bex tells Louise that Alexandra followed Travis into the kitchen, Alexandra admits to Louise that Travis did not spike her drink without revealing that she and Madison did it. Sharon wants to meet Travis, inviting him for dinner, but Louise calls it off when Madison and Alexandra tells her he is only interested in sex. Travis later kisses Louise in the park, but she runs away. Louise meets Travis and he asks her if she wants to break up with him. She denies it and he denies it too when she asks the same question. Travis asks Louise if she is ready to have sex but they are both unsure. Travis humiliates Keegan in front of his schoolmates after Keegan makes fun of him. Travis breaks up with Louise, believing the rumours that Louise had sex with Keegan. Madison and Alexandra tell him that he did the right thing.

During rehearsal, Alexandra confidentially kisses Travis despite the role calling for her to act shy. After Louise tells Bex she is worried that Travis and Alexandra are getting close, Bex and Shakil talk to Travis, who says that he only sees Alexandra as Juliet and wonders if he has given her a wrong impression, especially as he agreed to take her to the prom as friends. He thinks that Louise hates him but Bex and Shakil convince him otherwise and tell him to apologise to her. He visits her and says he should have let her explain about Keegan instead of ending their relationship. After Alexandra and Madison are publicly exposed as being Bex's bullies, Travis asks Louise to be his date for the school prom. At prom, Louise and Travis win most beautiful couple and Travis arranges an area behind the stage with candles for them. Alexandra and Madison turn up and Louise berates them and their actions and Alexandra pushes Louise onto lit candles, setting off the fire alarms and sprinklers. Louise is in agony as Mr Gethin Pryce (Cerith Flinn) and other students help her by cooling the burns with water. Travis blames himself for the incident and at the hospital, Sharon reluctantly allows him to see her. Louise orders him out of the room. Louise is distressed when her mother Lisa Fowler (Lucy Benjamin) and Bex arrange for Travis to visit her, because she does not want him to see her in that condition but he gives Louise a promise ring, leaving Louise happy. Keegan freaks Louise out by using a scar covered mask and Travis' protectiveness overwhelms Louise. Louise decides to end her relationship with Travis.

James-Phelps' casting in EastEnders was announced by Beresford Management. Daniel Kilkelly of Digital Spy wrote about Travis, "Proving that he's not a "total toenail" like the Square's other recent new arrival Keegan, Travis even helped Louise out when she was having some trouble with a pesky drinks machine. What a guy!"

== Gethin Pryce ==
Gethin Pryce
- EastEnders character
- Portrayed by: Cerith Flinn
- First appearance: Episode 5430; 23 January 2017
- Last appearance: Episode 5598; 14 November 2017
- Introduced by: Sean O'Connor
In-universe information
- Occupation: Teacher

Gethin Pryce played by Cerith Flinn, is a teacher of Walford High School. He first appears in the episode broadcast on 23 January 2017. He made his final appearance on 14 November. He appears in 36 episodes.

Gethin is a drama teacher at Walford High School who advises Bex Fowler (Jasmine Armfield) to use her time wisely at home to study for her music exam after the pupils are sent home due to a faulty boiler. He later breaks up a fight between Shakil Kazemi (Shaheen Jafargholi) and Zayan Scott (Alex Blake). When Bex is found in a state by Gethin and Mrs Robyn Lund (Polly Highton) in the toilets, she admits to them that Madison Drake and Alexandra D'Costa (Seraphina Beh and Sydney Craven) bullied her, and that Louise Mitchell (Tilly Keeper) sent the explicit photo of Shakil that previously got Bex in trouble. Louise, Madison and Alexandra deny any involvement.

Gethin meets with Bex's mother, Sonia Fowler (Natalie Cassidy), and asks Sonia to encourage Bex to take part in an upcoming school showcase. Gethin encourages Bex to sing her original song, "Boxed Up Broken Heart", at the showcase, and she agrees. At the showcase, Gethin calls Bex to the stage but when she is missing he calls Alexandra and Travis Law-Hughes (Alex James-Phelps) for their performance of Romeo and Juliet. Alexandra is also missing so Gethin asks Louise to take over. At the prom, Gethin presents "Most Beautiful Couple" to Louise and Travis. The sprinklers go off due to a fire, so Gethin evacuates the students out of the school. Louise is burnt, and Gethin tries to get the students to cool her burns with water. When Travis blames himself for Louise's burns, Gethin assures him that it was not his fault. Gethin later names Madison and Alexandra when they are arrested by the police, but he does not stop the other students from insulting them when they are both escorted out. Gethin later informs Bex and Sonia that Madison and Alexandra will be prosecuted.

Gethin appears in Walford looking for somewhere to live and Sonia informs him that she will speak with her uncle Jack Branning (Scott Maslen) about locating a property on the Square. Gethin then moves into one of Jack's flats. Sonia later meets him on the square and offers to wash his clothes when he finds out the laundrette is closed. Sonia tells Gethin about the residents and he tells Sonia about his break up with his former girlfriend. After receiving news that his grandmother had died, Gethin goes to her funeral and tells Sonia that his father did not go to the funeral. Bex receives her GCSE results and is disappointed that she gained a D in music, so Sonia contacts Gethin about Bex's result and Gethin agrees to tutor Bex.

Following a gas explosion in Albert Square, Bex helps Gethin and when she takes him to her house to clean his wounds, Bex and Gethin kiss. Gethin reassures Bex as she apologises for her actions, but she reminds him he did not stop her. Gethin tells Bex he cannot tutor her in music, but has found a new tutor. Gethin tells Bex that it is illegal for a relationship to happen between them as she is a minor who he has a duty of care for and tells her he has no feelings for her. Gethin warns a man that visits Sonia to stay away from her, who was the son of a patient who died in Kettering, after Sonia inherited his mother's money. Bex attempts to make Gethin jealous by flirting with Shakil and Gethin asks her to stop her behaviour. Sonia queries Gethin about the possibility of a relationship and Gethin kisses Sonia, watched by Bex. Bex tries to convince Gethin that he wants her and not Sonia but Gethin tells her that he could lose his job or go to prison if they have a relationship. Sonia then tells Gethin that she thinks Bex fancies him. Bex tells Gethin she is moving on from what happened between them, claiming to have an older boyfriend, and Gethin decides to tutor Bex again.

On Bex's 17th birthday, Bex's uncle and Sonia's half-brother Robbie Jackson (Dean Gaffney) forces Gethin to take his place to give Bex a driving lesson and when Bex tries to pursue Gethin, he tells her again that it cannot happen. While Gethin and Sonia are having a meal at her home, Sonia is called into work, so Bex visits Gethin and tries to get him to admit that he likes her. When Sonia returns, he tells her that Bex kissed him. Sonia is furious, but Gethin claims that Bex kissed him against his will, however, when Bex says that he kissed her back, Sonia throws him out. She asks Bex for the whole truth and Bex insists it was just a kiss and asks Sonia not to report Gethin. Gethin gets drunk and tells Jack that he has been set up by a student and when Jack takes him to get his wallet from Sonia's, Sonia tells Jack about the kiss, so Jack evicts Gethin from his flat with immediate effect, and tells him to leave Walford, which Gethin does. The following day, Bex tells Sonia that Gethin was not in school and Sonia reveals that he called her, letting her know that he has resigned and will not be returning to Walford.

In August 2017, Sophie Dainty of Digital Spy suggested that Gethin would be appearing more regularly and that he would be a love interest for Sonia, asking, "Could a new romance be on the cards for Sonia if they become neighbours?"

== Hugo Browning ==
Hugo Browning
- EastEnders character
- Portrayed by: Simon Williams
- First appearance: Episode 5432; 26 January 2017
- Last appearance: Episode 5626; 28 December 2017
- Introduced by: Sean O'Connor
In-universe information
- Occupation: Chairman of Weyland & Co
- Father: Henry Browning
- Mother: Dulcie Browning
- Sisters: Elizabeth Willmott-Brown
- Nephews: Luke Browning
- Nieces: Fi Browning

Hugo Browning, (initially credited as Chairman, Weyland & Co), is the Chairman of a development company called Weyland & Co. He made his first appearance on 26 January 2017, and departed on 28 December 2017 at the conclusion of his storyline.

Hugo meets Max Branning (Jake Wood) at The Shard, talking about a plan to redevelop Albert Square as an act of revenge for Max's being falsely imprisoned for Lucy Beale's (Hetti Bywater) murder. Hugo meets with Max and tells him that Max's former cellmate, later revealed to be Hugo's nephew, Luke Browning (Adam Astill), has requested a prison visit and that Max needs to speed up his plans to take The Queen Victoria pub. In September 2017 when Max collects Luke when he is released from prison, he takes him home to be reunited with his sister, Fi Browning (Lisa Faulkner) and half-brother, Josh Hemmings (Eddie Eyre). Hugo is revealed to be the brother-in-law of James Willmott-Brown (William Boyde). When Mick Carter (Danny Dyer) and Linda Carter (Kellie Bright) have a meeting with Hugo and Fi, Hugo tells them they have five weeks to pay him £60,000 or else they lose the pub. Later, Fi gives Mick a document where the Carters would receive a payout if they left the Vic. Mick then signs the paperwork but he signs it as "Lady Di" which leaves Hugo furious. He then reveals that Fi had been sharing personal information about the Carters with him. Linda then throws a drink in Fi's face. Hugo and Fi then leave and Hugo threatens to evict the Carters if they do not pay the money. Fi tricks the Carters into believing they can pay £50,000, which they raise, but as this was a lie, James, Luke and Hugo serve the Carters with an eviction notice. When James suffers a heart attack after Fi believes Kathy Beale's (Gillian Taylforth) side of the story about James raping her, Fi puts together a dossier containing incriminating evidence against Weyland & Co. Fi threatens to give it to the police, bringing down the entire company unless Hugo signs all the Walford properties over to her. In order to ensure the survival of the company, Hugo signs all the properties over to Fi so that she can sell them back to their owners, and the Walford redevelopment plan is abandoned.

== Zayan Scott ==
Zayan Scott
- EastEnders character
- Portrayed by: Alex Blake
- Duration: 2017–2018
- First appearance: Episode 5442; 6 February 2017
- Last appearance: Episode 5468; 1 June 2018
- Introduced by: Sean O'Connor
In-universe information
- Occupation: Student
- Half-brothers: Lewis

Zayan Scott, played by Alex Blake, appears in the episode first broadcast on 6 February 2017. He returns for two appearances in the episodes first broadcast on 29 May and 1 June 2018.

Zayan is a schoolboy who taunts Shakil Kazemi (Shaheen Jafargholi) over his explicit photo. Zayan's words anger Shakil and they end up fighting, and Zayan leaves Shakil with cuts to his face. In May 2018, after Shakil is stabbed and killed, Keegan Baker (Zack Morris) meets Zayan in secret. Keegan's half-brother, Keanu Taylor (Danny Walters) confronts Keegan over the meeting, saying that Zayan's half-brother, Lewis, stabbed someone the year before and is in prison, but Keegan reveals that Zayan is going to help track down the people who attacked Shakil so Keegan can take revenge. Zayan later gives Keegan information about Bruno (Josh Fraser), Shakil's killer.

Zayan's fight with Shakil was criticised by viewers as "too violent" for the time it was shown on television.

== Preston Cooper ==
Preston Cooper
- EastEnders character
- Portrayed by: Martin Anzor
- First appearance: Episode 5442; 14 February 2017
- Last appearance: Episode 5468; 31 March 2017
- Introduced by: Sean O'Connor
In-universe information
- Occupation: Student

Preston Cooper, played by Martin Anzor, is a former student of Michelle Fowler's (Jenna Russell), with whom she had an illegal relationship with in Florida. He appears in 16 episodes between 14 February and 31 March 2017.

When Michelle returns to Walford at Christmas 2016, she confides in her best friend, Sharon Mitchell (Letitia Dean) that she had a relationship with a 17-year-old student in the United States, meaning she had broken the law. Preston arrives in Walford unexpectedly on Valentine's Day and he and Michelle kiss. Michelle goes for a job interview at a teaching agency, but fails to get the job as they find out from her references about her relationship with Preston. Michelle insists that he should go home. Preston tries to win Michelle back, but she is adamant their relationship is over. Michelle later sees Preston with her niece, Bex Fowler (Jasmine Armfield). They later kiss, and Preston encourages Bex to truant from school. Preston then texts Michelle that he needs to see her, but when she arrives, he is in bed with Bex and he acts surprised to see her. Michelle demands that Preston leave immediately but he ignores her, and she realises that he used Bex to make her jealous. Preston then leads Michelle upstairs; it is implied that they have sex. Dennis Rickman Jnr (Bleu Landau), who Michelle is looking after while Sharon is on holiday, sees Michelle and Preston kissing and starts blackmailing Michelle.

Preston goes to Manchester for a while to visit a friend and on his return, despite being pleased to see him, Michelle rejects him when she is turned down for a job interview for a teaching assistant (for being "overqualified"). Preston is rude towards Mick Carter (Danny Dyer) when he refuses to serve him for already being drunk and underage, and Michelle returns home to find the police there with Preston. When Dennis calls Michelle a paedophile, she hits him, and his step-sister, Louise Mitchell (Tilly Keeper), witnesses Michelle shouting at Dennis. Dennis tells Louise about Michelle and Preston, and Louise tells Bex. Bex, who has just made her relationship with Preston "official", does not believe her, but then sees Preston touching Michelle and Michelle flinching, so publicly asks Michelle if she is having sex with her boyfriend. Michelle refuses to answer but Louise reveals the truth. Michelle's brother and Bex's father, Martin Fowler (James Bye) punches Preston and disowns Michelle. Preston admits to Bex he loves Michelle but then is forced to leave the pub. A drunk Michelle frantically searches for Preston and on hearing that he has headed for the tube station, she gets in Phil Mitchell's (Steve McFadden) car and speeds around the square. She narrowly avoids hitting Preston and crashes into the chip shop with Kathy Beale (Gillian Taylforth) and Kush Kazemi (Davood Ghadami) inside. Sharon returns from her holiday when she finds out that Michelle is in hospital and she convinces Preston that Michelle does not love him, that his presence is only hurting her and to return to the United States.

Justin Harp from Digital Spy said "the romance is bound to cause trouble in Walford, since even Michelle's lifelong best friend Sharon reacted harshly when she first learned the truth". Jonathon Hughes from Radio Times said, "despite the scandal surrounding their romance they're both ready to pick up where they left off".

== Konrad Topolski ==
Konrad Topolski
- EastEnders character
- Portrayed by: Piotr Baumann
- First appearance: Episode 5443/5444; 16 February 2017
- Last appearance: Episode 5488; 5 May 2017
- Introduced by: Sean O'Connor
In-universe information
- Occupation: Shopkeeper

Konrad Topolski, played by Piotr Baumann, is a Polish shopkeeper. He first appears in the episode broadcast on 16 February 2017.

Konrad meets Shirley Carter (Linda Henry) outside his Polish delicatessen and she asks if he can help out with The Queen Victoria's Polish-themed night. Konrad provides food for the Polish supper and helps Shirley and Kathy Beale (Gillian Taylforth) prepare the meal. However, the kitchen is shut down by an environmental health officer, Agnes Novak (Margaréta Szabó), due to a rat being spotted in the kitchen. Konrad brings food from his shop, making the night a success. He tells Shirley that he will not charge them as the food is slightly out of date. However, then someone spray paints "Poles go home" on the door of the pub but Konrad simply calls it "the Britain we live in now". Konrad then offers to help fix the leaks in the pub at a discounted price. However, due to court fines that Mick is due to pay, he is unable to pay Konrad, until Shirley decides to go to prison for not paying the fines and Mick then pays Konrad. He later comes to Shirley's welcome party only to find out that her stay in prison has been extended. When loan sharks cut off Karen Taylor's (Lorraine Stanley) electricity, Shirley asks him to put it back on, which he does, however, he does not appear on-screen.

The character is a new love interest for Shirley. Inside Soap called the character a "burly eastern European fella" and speculated on whether Shirley would see him as someone to depend on and who would become a soulmate. The showing of graffiti reading "Poles go home" following the Polish-themed night was criticised by some viewers as showing anti-Brexit bias from the BBC, however, writer Leo Richardson defended his script, saying "That story was rooted in reality. That's how the main soaps generate a lot of their stories. A diverse array of writers, from all over the country get together with their story team and producers on a regular basis and they talk about what they're seeing. [...] Now, more than ever, in a divided world, it is the job of artists, of writers, of TV comedy and drama, not only to entrain us, but to reflect the things happening in our world, on screen. To show us not only what is familiar, but also wildly different. To reflect the lives of people who are underrepresented, so we can understand those who we didn't before. If getting a brief glimpse into the mind of a man [Konrad] struggling to find his place in the country he lives in makes you uncomfortable then perhaps you needed to see it."

== Josh Hemmings ==
Josh Hemmings
- EastEnders character
- Portrayed by: Eddie Eyre
- Duration: 2017–2018
- First appearance: Episode 5460; 17 March 2017
- Last appearance: Episode 5657; 16 February 2018
- Introduced by: Sean O'Connor
In-universe information
- Occupation: Associate Director of Weyland & Co
- Father: James Willmott-Brown
- Mother: Wendy Hemmings
- Half-brothers: Luke Browning
- Half-sisters: Fi Browning

Josh Hemmings, played by Eddie Eyre, is a worker of Weyland & Co and colleague of Max Branning (Jake Wood) introduced as a love interest for Max's daughter Lauren Branning (Jacqueline Jossa). He first appears in the episode broadcast on 17 March 2017, where he was initially credited as "Photocopier guy". Eyre finished filming with the serial in February 2018, and he departed on 16 February 2018.

When Lauren visits Max's office to check on him, she sees Josh having trouble with the photocopier and helps him solve the problem. Josh is attracted to her and leaves his phone number for Lauren with the receptionist (Kristen Obank). Lauren is pleased and goes to text him when she gets home but bins it when her boyfriend, Steven Beale (Aaron Sidwell) arrives. Lauren tells her friend Whitney Carter (Shona McGarty) about Josh, who tries to put Lauren off because she has a boyfriend and a son, Louie Beale. Lauren invites Whitney out for drinks near to Max and Josh's office in the hope of seeing him again, because she has lost her phone. Lauren sees Josh and invites him in for drinks, where they flirt and she takes his number again, though Whitney continues to remind her of Steven and Louie.

Lauren later meets Josh in a restaurant to tell him about the job she applied for at Weyland & Co. A week later, Lauren goes to a nightclub with her sister Abi Branning (Lorna Fitzgerald) and Whitney and Josh goes to see Lauren. They are left alone, and Josh goes to kiss Lauren but she rejects him because she feels guilty about Steven and Louie. When Lauren attends her job interview at Weyland & Co, Josh sees her waiting and compliments her, telling her she will get the job. Lauren is interviewed by Corrine Mandel (Laura Rogers) and is shocked when Josh joins the interview, as she assumed he was only a photocopier operator. After the interview, Josh tells her that she did well, and she slaps him for lying about his job. He says she lied too as she never told him her father works at the same company, and accuses her of liking him. She insults him but they kiss, and when she returns home, he texts her with the message, "Don't pretend you didn't feel it too."

The following week, Max tells Josh not to give Lauren a job and makes sure another candidate is offered it, but Josh visits Lauren at home and offers her a job as a creative team assistant. He also meets Steven, who is wary of him, and realises that Lauren has a son. Outside, Josh meets Max and tells him that he has given Lauren a job, adding that Max has done well with The Queen Victoria pub, referring to Weyland's plan to develop the local area. Josh tells Max never to tell him what to do again as he is his boss, and reminds him of their mole in the pub. On Lauren's first day, Josh does a presentation for two clients, Toby (Matt Jessup) and Nargis (Shanice Stewart-Jones) and asks Lauren to join him; he is impressed with her local knowledge. Josh invites Lauren to a work event and she walks in on him, changing in his office. Josh asks Lauren to stay for sushi afterwards and she agrees, despite having plans with Steven. Josh reveals he used to stutter as a child but overcame it with therapy. Josh takes Lauren home and Abi points out Josh's attractiveness to Steven when she sees them, making Steven worried about Lauren and Josh's relationship. When Steven makes dinner for Lauren, she comes home early and Josh is with her. Steven invites Josh to stay for dinner. Abi arrives and joins them, and she flirts with Josh. Josh suggests that Lauren should go home after she develops morning sickness as he thinks she has a stomach bug.

Josh is surprised when Lauren returns to work later in the week. Josh and Corrine celebrate when they receive good news about one of the company's projects. Josh asks Lauren if she wants to celebrate with them but she tells him that she needs to go somewhere but she will not be long. Josh tells Lauren that Abi has invited him to her 21st birthday party, realising that Lauren lied to Abi that he is unavailable. Max reveals to Lauren that Josh is engaged to Imogen (Alexandra Sinclair), and Josh apologises for not telling her, but she is upset and tells him she is busy. Josh visits Lauren at home and explains that he did not tell her about Imogen because she had been travelling the world and is only with her to keep their parents happy, but they know their relationship is over. Steven sees Josh and Lauren together and threatens Josh. At Abi's party, she kisses Josh, and a jealous Lauren states he is engaged. Later, Josh admits flirting with Abi to get a reaction from Lauren, but she insists she does not want to cheat on Steven and tells him not to go after Abi. Steven gets a mobile charger with a hidden camera to spy on Lauren while she is at work, and watches her and Josh talking. Josh tries to get Lauren to admit that her relationship is not working but she refuses. The next day, Lauren tells Josh that she does not love Steven any more and she will end their relationship. Steven learns from Josh that Lauren has resigned when Josh visits her. Josh visits again and learns that she is planning to go to New Zealand to see Peter Beale (Ben Hardy), but he convinces her to stay. He declares his love for Lauren but she says she does not feel the same way. Josh overhears Lauren talking to Max on the phone where she mentions that she is engaged to Steven. A disappointed Josh congratulates her. Lauren later tells Josh that she has been selfish and being in the company has made her realise that she needs to be with Steven, so she resigns from Weyland & Co. When Steven dies, Lauren contacts Josh and she tells him that she wants him to be with her at Steven's funeral. Josh is then revealed to be the brother of Fi Browning (Lisa Faulkner). The following day, Fi is revealed as the daughter of James Willmott-Brown (William Boyde), also father to Josh, who reunite with him and brother Luke Browning (Adam Astill). They are joined by Max and their uncle Hugo Browning (Simon Williams).

When Lauren returns to her job, Josh continues to pursue her but Imogen visits and belittles Lauren, which Josh tells her not to. When Imogen leaves, Josh flirts with Lauren and she kisses him. After being told by Imogen that Josh does not like children, Lauren asks if he would like to go with her and Louie to the zoo. He reluctantly accepts but implies they should go out together as a couple instead, which displeases Lauren. Josh visits Lauren the following day and declares his love again. When he asks her why they cannot be together, she explains that they have very different lifestyles and asks him to leave. However, after a heart-to-heart with Kathy Beale (Gillian Taylforth), Lauren decides to give Josh a chance and they start dating. Kathy's son Ben Mitchell (Harry Reid) finds a business card in his boyfriend Luke's wallet reading "Project Dagmar" and when Ben questions what it means, Luke chokes Ben when he refuses to drop the subject. Ben tells Lauren about this, and Lauren asks Josh about Project Dagmar, but he has no knowledge of it, so questions Luke. Luke throttles him but Fi breaks them up and Josh is hurt that Fi is in on Project Dagmar whilst he is excluded. Lauren finds a Project Dagmar model, showing plans for Albert Square to be developed into luxury apartments. Josh watches on when his family reveals in The Queen Victoria that they now own the business, serve an eviction notice to the Carter family and inform the locals that the pub will become flats, also revealing that they did it with Max's help. Lauren is angry with Josh for what his family has done and James tries to comfort a hurt Josh, telling him to earn his father's trust. When Luke sacks Lauren for refusing to serve an eviction notice on Steven's father, Ian Beale (Adam Woodyatt), Josh gives Lauren a copy of Max's contract that shows he is owed 20%, after Max's copy was destroyed by James. With Luke missing, James asks Josh to serve the eviction notice on Ian. Josh visits Lauren and tells her the development can be stopped, but he needs her help whilst he accesses James's computer that has documents to prove that James bribes council officials. Whilst James and Fi attend a press launch, Josh downloads the files and Lauren gets arrested when she stages a protest at the launch to hold James and Fi up. When James returns, Lauren contacts Josh and James demands the downloaded files. Josh decides to quit his job and at the police station, he tells Lauren what he did and Lauren kisses him. Fi tries to get Josh to return, but he tells Fi that James has ruined and controls their lives just like with their mothers. When Fi attempts to question James over why he never allowed Wendy to get a job or why her mother Elizabeth committed suicide, James pushes her. Josh gets a job offer in Glasgow and when Ian catches Lauren and Josh kissing, he confronts them and Josh stands up to Ian, saying he is not like James and loves Lauren. Josh is offered a job in Glasgow and Lauren prepares to move there with him. However, their departure is delayed when Lauren and Abi are rushed to the hospital after falling from the Vic while trying to stop Max from committing suicide, though Lauren appears to be fine soon afterwards. Josh later visits Lauren in the hospital as she recovers from the fall, though is reluctant to tell her that Abi is brainstem dead. However, after Lauren finds out from a nurse and slaps Max for lying to her about Abi's condition, Max confronts Josh about their move to Glasgow and threatens him not to manipulate Lauren or he will have him beaten up. Abi later dies after her life support is withdrawn. On the day of her funeral, Whitney and Lauren talk about Josh and Whitney tells Lauren to think about whether Josh is right for her and if she can love him as much as she loved Peter. After Abi's funeral, Lauren takes Louie and walks past Josh implying that she leaves without him.

Tasha Hegarty of Digital Spy referred to Josh as a Clark Kent lookalike who also resembles Hollyoaks character Will Savage (James Atherton), adding "Will Savage's face isn't one you can trust, is it? So, that's the question: is the photocopier guy completely innocent? Or is he up to something far shadier? Like maybe he's actually involved with Max's revenge plot, which would make the whole Clark Kent look a brilliant way of tricking Lauren (and the viewers)".

== Tommy ==
Tommy
- EastEnders character
- Portrayed by: Jordan Coulson
- Appears in: Episode 5462; 21 March 2017
- Introduced by: Sean O'Connor

Tommy, also called Tom in the show, is played by Jordan Coulson. He appears in the first episode shown on 21 March 2017. He is a friend of Jay Brown's (Jamie Borthwick) who helps Jay organise Ben Mitchell's (Harry Reid) 21st birthday party. He later kisses Abi Branning (Lorna Fitzgerald) but he upsets her when he forgets her name.

Niomi Harris from OK! said that Ben and Jay's party was "overshadowed by newcomer Tom" and called him "hilarious", reporting that many viewers were "baffled at who he was and where he came from". Cydney Yeates from the Daily Star called Tommy a "surprise new character", but said that he lacked a backstory, which also confused viewers. Laura-Jane Tyler from Inside Soap said, "Walford newcomer Tommy should definitely move in with Ben and Jay. He's hilarious!"

== Reverend Irene Mills ==
Irene Mills
- EastEnders character
- Portrayed by: Melanie Kilburn
- Duration: 2017–2018, 2022–2025
- First appearance: Episode 5477; 17 April 2017
- Last appearance: Episode 7097; 7 April 2025
- Introduced by: Sean O'Connor (2017) Chris Clenshaw (2022 - 2025)
In-universe information
- Occupation: Vicar

The Reverend Irene Mills, portrayed by Melanie Kilburn, was a vicar who first appeared on 17 April 2017. She first appears as a prison chaplain who visits Shirley Carter (Linda Henry) in her cell because she knows Shirley is not planning to go to the funeral of her mother, Sylvie Carter (Linda Marlowe). Irene tells Shirley she did not go to her own mother's funeral and tells her where the chapel is if she wants to talk. Later, Shirley goes to the chapel and asks why Irene did not go to her mother's funeral, to which she says she hated her, and asks Shirley about her mother. Shirley explains that Sylvie was never a good mother, and Irene wonders if Sylvie needs to mourn for the little girl she used to be. Shirley tells Irene about her childhood, including a time Sylvie allowed her to wear makeup but then said she looked like a tart, and would often leave her alone in the house with no food. Shirley cries to Irene, asking why her mother never loved her. Five months later, she reveals to Dot Branning (June Brown) that she will be replacing Reverend Stevens (Michael Keating) as the new vicar. She visits Dot again because Dot has not been attending parish meetings, and she is worried that Dot dislikes that she is a lesbian, but Dot is only concerned with Mills's use of technology in her sermons. In February 2018, Irene performs Abi Branning's (Lorna Fitzgerald) funeral and again in July to conduct Shakil Kazemi's (Shaheen Jafargholi) funeral.

Four years later, in 2022, Irene returns for the marriage of Phil Mitchell (Steve McFadden) and Kat Slater (Jessie Wallace), which is later postponed and the funeral of Dot. She appears throughout 2023 to discussing wedding plans with Kathy Beale (Gillian Taylforth) and Tom "Rocky" Cotton (Brian Conley) as well as discussing Lola Pearce's (Danielle Harold) illness with her husband Jay Brown (Jamie Borthwick), which leads her to discussing losing her partner Madga in a car accident. She also helps organise Lola's funeral with Billy Mitchell (Perry Fenwick) and conducts the wedding of Sharon Watts (Letitia Dean) and Keanu Taylor (Danny Walters), which is later cancelled. She appeared in Linda Carter's (Kellie Bright) epiphany episode in 2024 and returned for Martin Fowler's (James Bye) funeral in April 2025.

== Woody Woodward ==
Woody Woodward
- EastEnders character
- Portrayed by: Lee Ryan
- Duration: 2017–2018
- First appearance: Episode 5478; 18 April 2017
- Last appearance: Episode 5725; 15 June 2018
- Introduced by: Sean O'Connor
In-universe information
- Occupation: Bar manager

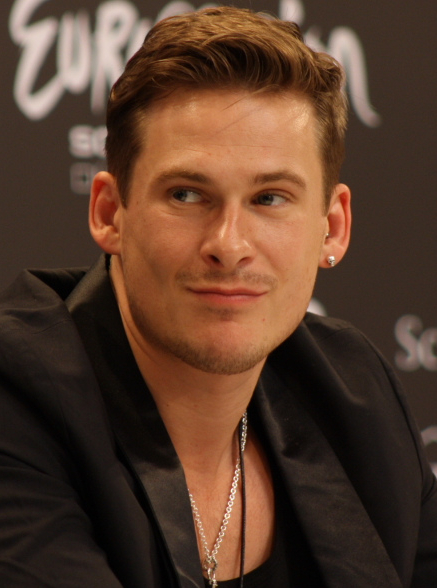
Lee Ryan played Woody Woodward

Harry "Woody" Woodward, played by singer Lee Ryan, made his first appearance on 18 April 2017. Woody initially appeared for a guest stint between 18 April and 19 May. It was later announced that Woody would be promoted to a regular role and that Ryan had signed a one-year contract with the show. His return aired on 3 August. Ryan made a temporary departure on 28 November. It was announced on 16 March 2018 that Ryan would be leaving the show at the end of his contract. He departed in the episode broadcast on 15 June 2018.

Woody arrives at The Queen Victoria pub (The Vic) as Tina Carter (Luisa Bradshaw-White), Johnny Carter (Ted Reilly) and Whitney Carter (Shona McGarty), are looking after the pub in the absence of the landlords, Linda Carter (Kellie Bright) and Mick Carter (Danny Dyer). Tina, Johnny and Whitney are surprised to see him there, but he explains to them and Shirley Carter (Linda Henry), that Linda sent him to help out. Woody moves into The Vic, and when they are unable to buy more beer due to unpaid bills, Woody supplies cocktails and Shirley is impressed. Woody arranges male strippers for a ladies' night at the pub where he attempts to set one of them up with Johnny and bets on the outcome. When Johnny finds out, he berates Woody. Tina, who is upset over the death of her mother, seeks solace in Woody, which results in them having sex.

When business consultant Fi Browning (Lisa Faulkner) tells the Carters that they must fire at least two of their employees, the Carters decide that Woody is the only one that should be fired. However, Woody refuses to go and Fi insists that the new freeholders, Grafton Hill, want him to stay, and Woody declares that until Linda tells him otherwise, he is the manager of the pub. Much to the disappointment of the Carters and Sharon Mitchell (Letitia Dean), Woody fires long-serving barmaid Tracey (Jane Slaughter) and Tina warns him to be careful. Woody and Whitney later grow closer when Woody comforts her when she receives a letter from her husband Lee Carter (Danny-Boy Hatchard), asking for a divorce. Woody later catches Whitney shoplifting and he saves her from a man who is coming onto her. When they arrive back at The Vic, they kiss and have sex, only for Mick to return and find them in bed together. Mick punches Woody and orders him to leave. After wishing the Carters good luck, Woody leaves Walford.

Months later, Woody returns to Walford and he and Whitney are now engaged. However, Mick still dislikes him. It is revealed that Woody knows that Linda has had cancer, something she has been keeping from Mick. When Mick and Linda decide to go on holiday, Woody is put in charge of managing the pub. Woody is then offered a job in Malaga as a Bar Manager but would need to relocate there immediately. Woody realises Whitney is worried that he will leave her, so he asks her to go with him which she delightfully accepts. When Whitney says farewell to her family and friends, Woody realises she is better to remain in Walford and leaves her a note at the tube station, thus leaving Walford without her and ending their engagement.

Woody returns to Walford after five months and seeks to resume his relationship with Whitney, although she does not want to and is now in a romance with Halfway (Tony Clay). Woody takes a job at the club as a barman, run by Mel Owen (Tamzin Outhwaite), competing with Billy Mitchell (Perry Fenwick). Much to Billy's dislike, Mel appoints Woody as the bar manager. When money is stolen from the club's safe, Mel's boyfriend, former police officer Jack Branning (Scott Maslen), finds out that Woody was in cahoots with Mo Harris (Laila Morse) and that he stole the money. Jack confronts Woody just before he is about to flee Walford with the money and succeeds in getting him to hand the money over. Before he leaves, Woody tells Jack that all he has ever done is run away after which, he departs Walford.

The character and Ryan's casting were announced on 15 February 2017, when it was said the character would "cause lots of trouble" upon his arrival. Ryan expressed his delight at his casting, calling Woody "the best role [he] could have wished to play" and "a brilliant character". He found it obvious that he is living "a full and colourful life" and looked forward to the public reaction. Sean O'Connor, the show's executive producer, also expressed his delight at Ryan's casting, branding him "a perfect casting" for the serial and revealing that producers decided immediately that they wanted Ryan for the role. O'Connor explained the character's backstory, which states he worked in several drinking establishments "around the world" before deciding to "put down some roots". He added that Woody would "ruffle some feathers and obviously break some hearts". Ryan was offered the part the day after his audition. He was invited to audition by EastEnders' casting executive, Julia Crampsie, 18 years after she first approached him about him joining the show. Ryan insisted that the character is not a "bad boy", despite being "a little bit manipulative" and explained that in his "sad" backstory, Woody has travelled and experienced the death of a relative. He said that there would be tension between Woody and Shirley after he is brought in as a bar manager at The Queen Vic pub, adding that "I think Shirley would quite like Woody to get lost!" Woody departed the serial in the episode broadcast on 28 November 2017 after agreeing to manage a bar in Spain. It was confirmed that Ryan had not left the cast and would return following a temporary break.

Daniel Kilkelly of entertainment website Digital Spy named Ryan one of "Soapland's rising stars", opining that despite heavy criticism following news of his casting, Ryan had "proved his doubters wrong". He praised Ryan's "easy chemistry" with his co-stars, noting that Woody's relationship with Whitney was eye-catching. He also commented, "In fact, in a pretty lacklustre year for the show, his scenes actually turned out to be one thing fans didn't have much to complain about." In May 2017, Laura-Jayne Tyler from Inside Soap hoped that she would see more of Woody, writing, "Like Danny Dyer, Lee Ryan has the natural charm and twinkle in his eye that's an essential requirement for the manager of the Queen Vic. He's been fun to have around these last few weeks. Don't be a stranger, Woody!" In August of the same year, Ryan was longlisted for Best Newcomer at the Inside Soap Awards. He made the viewer-voted shortlist, but lost out to Julia Goulding, who portrays Shona Ramsey in Coronation Street.

== Freda ==
Freda
- EastEnders character
- Portrayed by: Leila Hoffman
- Duration: 2017, 2019
- First appearance: Episode 5497; 22 May 2017
- Last appearance: Episode 6007; 15 October 2019
- Introduced by: Sean O'Connor (2017); Kate Oates and Jon Sen (2019)
In-universe information
- Occupation: Cleaner

Freda, played by Leila Hoffman, appears in two episodes on 22 and 26 May 2017. She later reappears in October 2019.

Freda is an elderly woman whom Denise Fox (Diane Parish) meets when she is taking her English literature GCSE exam and she finds out Freda is taking five exams—English, English literature, French, history and maths. After the exam, Freda buys Denise a drink and says that although she found the exam tricky, she was enjoyed studying and that even if she fails, it was worth it as it is better than cleaning people's houses, which is her job. Freda and Denise later sit their final exam and afterwards, Freda tells Denise that her mind went blank and asks how Denise did. Denise collapses and Freda tries to talk to her. In 2019, Martin Fowler (James Bye) is sent to collect an outstanding debt from Freda by Ben Mitchell (Max Bowden). Martin takes pity on Freda, however, and instead uses takings from the fruit stall on the market to pay Ben.

Cydney Yeates of the Daily Star said that Freda stole the "soap limelight" and fans wanted her as a regular character.

== Ted Murray ==
Ted Murray
- EastEnders character
- Portrayed by: Christopher Timothy
- Duration: 2017–2019
- First appearance: Episode 5500; 26 May 2017
- Last appearance: Episode 6001; 27 September 2019 Episode 6002; 30 September 2019 (voiceover)
- Introduced by: Sean O'Connor
In-universe information
- Occupation: Potman
- Wife: Joyce Murray (until 2018)
- Sons: Alan Murray
- Daughters: Judith Thompson; Barbara

Ted Murray, played by Christopher Timothy, first appears in the episode broadcast on 26 May 2017, along with his wife Joyce Murray, played by Maggie Steed. The character made a previously unannounced departure from the show on 27 September 2019.

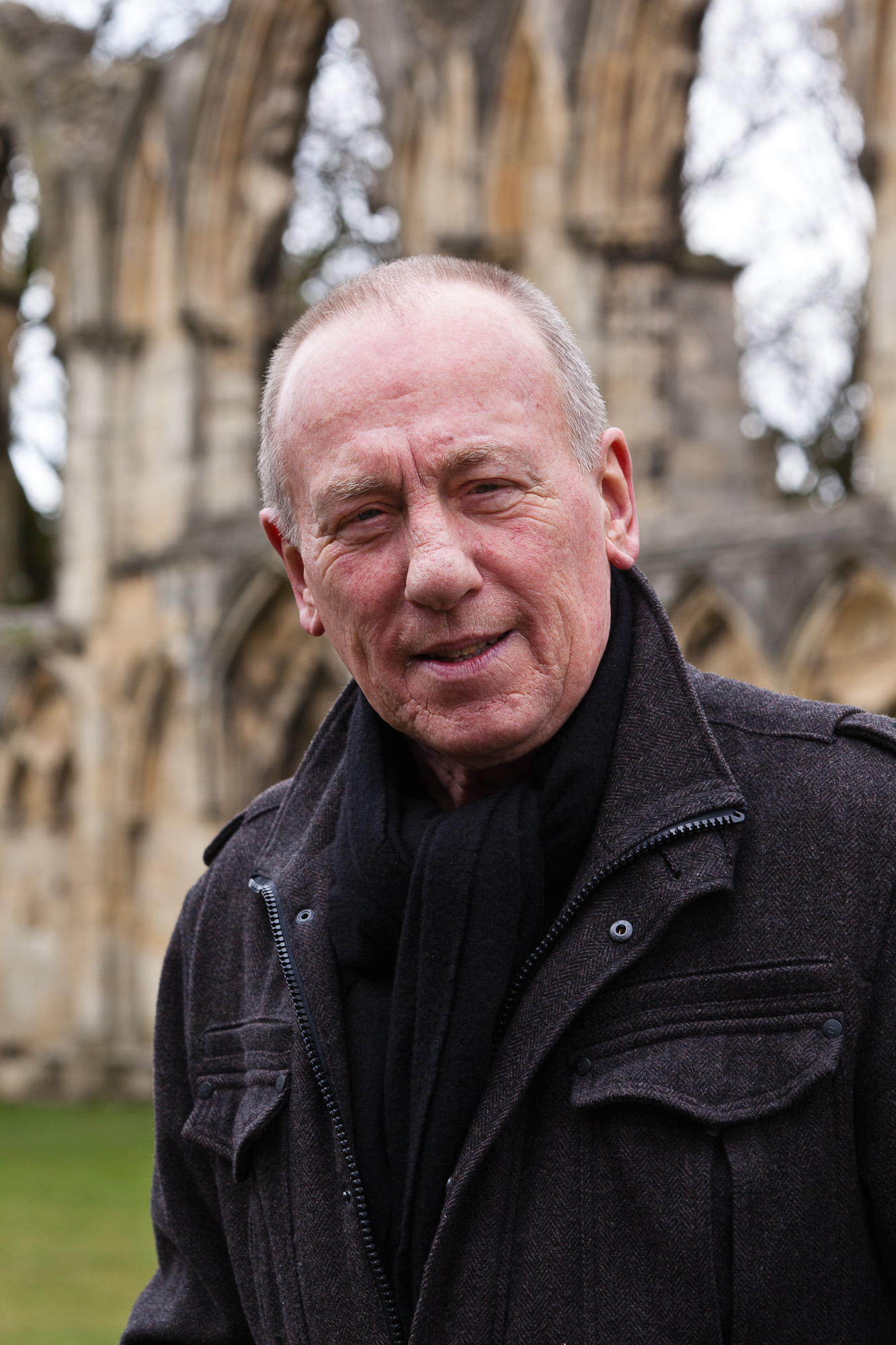
Actor Christopher Timothy was cast as Ted.

Ted and Joyce are a married couple, who arrive in Albert Square after being rehoused. They finish packing up their flat at Walford Towers and arrive at their new home. Ted tells Joyce that Dot Branning (June Brown) is their neighbour, who they already know, and Ted mentions that Dot's son Nick Cotton (John Altman) used to be friends with their son, Alan. Joyce is upset that Ted has brought a box with them after agreeing to "keep the past in the past". Joyce instructs Ted to keep it out of her way and he opens the box, which has a gun inside. Ted and Joyce meet up with a friend, Joan Murfield (Eileen Davies), and talk about a family they describe as being "neighbours from hell" who nearly killed Joan. Ted and Joyce decide they like their new home as it is peaceful but are then horrified to discover that Karen Taylor (Lorraine Stanley) and her children have moved in above them, as Karen is the woman who caused Joan's nervous breakdown. Ted later applies for a vacancy at the local The Queen Victoria public house as a potman. Although the landlord Mick Carter (Danny Dyer) chooses Ted, he agrees that both Ted and Patrick Trueman (Rudolph Walker) should share the job on a part-time basis. Ted and Joyce find that they have been burgled and Ted blames the Taylors and the police question them. Keanu Taylor (Danny Walters) insists to Ted and Joyce that they played no part in the break-in and Joyce is grateful when Keanu offers to board up their window.

When a gas tank explodes outside the couple's flat, it smashes their windows and debris flies through. Ted panics, convinced that someone is trying to harm him and Joyce, who tries to calm him down. Ted arms himself with his gun and when someone checks on the couple, Ted accidentally shoots Johnny Carter (Ted Reilly). Joyce calls the emergency services and she is arrested after taking the blame to protect Ted. When Joyce visits Johnny in hospital and he realises Ted was the person who shot him, Johnny's mother Linda Carter (Kellie Bright) decides to confront Joyce who promises Ted that she will still take the blame for him. Joyce and Ted later receive community service and a suspended sentence respectively, thanks to Ted's psychiatric report and a letter Johnny wrote in their defence.

Joyce is supportive of Ted when he begins teaching Bernadette Taylor (Clair Norris) how to play chess, but is frustrated when doing so consumes most of Ted's time. On Alan's birthday, Bernadette is scheduled to play in a chess tournament and asks Ted to support her. Joyce is upset that Ted intends to miss a Skype call with their son for the tournament and argues with him, berating him for giving Bernadette the time and affection that he never gave his own children. When Bernadette panics at the tournament, Joyce relents and allows Ted to go to her, realising the importance for both of them. Ted returns later that night to find Joyce in bed, but in the morning realises that Joyce has died in her sleep.

When Sheree Trueman (Suzette Llewellyn) sets Ted up with her mother Wanda Baptiste (Anni Domingo), Wanda announces that she has two tickets to travel the world for a year, and invites Ted. At first, he is reluctant due to Denise Fox (Diane Parish) making an effort to dissuade him, but he later comes round to the idea. After saying goodbye to his friends, he leaves with Wanda.

The character and Timothy's casting were announced on 1 April 2017. Of his casting, Timothy said, "The most exciting thing about joining EastEnders is not only that I'll be back on the television, but I'll also be working with Maggie. I have admired her for a long time. She is one of my favourite actresses. Filming not just our first scenes but our first episode together will be like first night in the theatre—very exciting indeed. And of course, I'm looking forward to meeting all the cast who I've been used to seeing on TV over the year." Executive producer Sean O'Connor added that he is "delighted to welcome Maggie and Christopher to Albert Square. They are both already much-loved by audiences and it's wonderful to have attracted such esteemed and acclaimed actors to the EastEnders cast". He said that the Murrays "are a breath of fresh air to Walford having achieved a long–standing marriage. But it's not long before echoes of the past catch up with them. I'm very excited to see what these wonderful performers—and these fascinating characters—bring to Albert Square." Timothy explained that Ted and Joyce were neighbours with Dot and "whether old animosities between Dot and the Murrays will resurface" and that "Joyce looks set to get annoyed with her husband when she discovers that he's broken a promise and brought a piece of their past with him."

After their first appearance, where scenes showed Ted and Joyce having a gun, Jonathan Hughes from Radio Times said the Murrays "seemed like a harmless elderly couple, if slightly put out at being rehoused by the council due to the imminent demolition of the tower block they've lived in for 40 years." He questioned why "two plucky pensioners" have a pistol and if it has "something to do with their previous links to Walford" as well as wondering if their son Alan is "another nasty Nick Cotton."

== Joyce Murray ==
Joyce Murray, played by Maggie Steed, first appears in the episode broadcast on 26 May 2017, along with her husband, Ted Murray, played by Christopher Timothy. On 22 March 2018, it was announced that Steed would be leaving the show. Joyce was killed off on 29 March.

== Tom Bailey ==
Tom Bailey
- EastEnders character
- Portrayed by: Daniel Casey
- First appearance: Episode 5503; 1 June 2017
- Last appearance: Episode 5595; 9 November 2017
- Introduced by: Sean O'Connor
In-universe information
- Occupation: Financial advisor

Tom Bailey (initially credited as "nosebleed man"), played by Daniel Casey, first appears in the episode broadcast on 1 June 2017 and departs in the episode broadcast on 9 November 2017, appearing in a total of 22 episodes.

Tom meets Michelle Fowler (Jenna Russell) on the London Underground after suffering a nosebleed and Michelle gives him a tissue. They meet a few times later on the train and Michelle tells her friend Sharon Mitchell (Letitia Dean) that she is interested in someone she met on the train, unaware that Tom is outside her home, looking at photos he covertly took of her. Tom meets Michelle on the train again, this time when she is working late and he claims to have a day off from work. They finally introduce themselves and Tom says he is widowed. Michelle invites Tom for a drink. They discuss Michelle's personal life but when she says her marriage went stale and someone younger showed interest, Tom assumes her husband cheated and not the other way around. Afterwards, Tom is aggressive to a stranger he accidentally bumps into. Tom and Michelle meet for a drink again and despite her confession that she was the one who fell in love with a younger student, causing the ending of her marriage, Tom kisses her.

After not hearing from Tom for a while, he returns and tells Michelle that he was scared because she is the first person he has dated since his wife's death and felt guilty. He invites Michelle for a drink and she says she will think about it. The next day she agrees to a drink in the Vic and they kiss in public. A few weeks later, he asks her out but she turns him down as she is babysitting. He turns up anyway, saying she sounded stressed, and asks her out for lunch the next day; Michelle says she will be in touch and walks away. Michelle breaks up with Tom but he continues to stalk her. When Michelle starts internet dating, she meets a man called Doug (Trevor Murphy) and goes on a date with him at The Albert bar. Michelle is unaware that Tom is watching her from the outside. When the date ends, Tom threatens Doug on the train and tells him he is Michelle's husband, she has used a fake name and is using him, and not to see her again. He then texts Michelle, saying he needs to see her, but she tells him to leave her alone. Tom looks at a picture of his wife in his wallet and replaces it with a picture he took of Michelle. Tom then sends Michelle a scarf and as it smells of a perfume he gave her, she guesses it is his wife's scarf. Michelle deletes Tom's text messages without replying, and Sharon tells her to return all his gifts. Tom then starts troubling the Mitchell household, where Michelle lives, with persistent silent phone calls, prompting Michelle and Sharon to report him to the police. Tom continues to follow her and she starts to get scared, locking herself in the house. The next day, she sees him in Albert Square and grabs him by the throat, telling him to leave her alone. Later, Sharon says she has called the police again, and that they said they would call him directly as it usually puts people off.

On Halloween night, Michelle sees Tom outside her home again, so Phil Mitchell (Steve McFadden) goes out and shouts at him, so Tom runs off. Michelle gets on the train to go to a party, but Tom follows her. On an empty carriage, she tells him to stop following her, and he says he does not want to but she is forcing him. He touches her face and tells her not to pretend she does not want this. To get rid of him, she tells him they should talk about it another night, and invites him to dinner the following week, claiming she has been scared of commitment. She tells him to stay on the train while she gets off, and he asks her for a kiss, which she does after he accuses him of lying. Michelle starts to research Tom online, and at their dinner, he is unaware that she is filming everything on her phone. He claims that his actions were just to get her attention, as "some women need convincing". He admits that things got out of hand but he wanted her to realise that they are meant to be together. She says what he did was harassment, but he says he loves her and reveals he knows things about her private life that she has not told him. He tries to kiss her but she backs away, so he forces himself on her. At that moment, Sharon, Denise Fox (Diane Parish) and Karen Taylor (Lorraine Stanley) walk in and Sharon hits him over the head with a vase, knocking him unconscious. When Tom wakes up, Michelle reveals that she had done research on his background, revealing that she knows his wife is not dead, merely divorced from him, and that he lied about his job to her. Michelle then reveals that everything has been recorded and says that if he comes near her again, she will show the video to his boss, clients and former wife. He agrees and leaves in shock.

Despite being credited as "nosebleed man", following the character's first episode, Ben Lee from Digital Spy reported that the actor has an official cast shot and the character's name is Tom, speculating that he would appear again. It was then reported that Tom would be a love interest for Michelle. Kate White from Inside Soap said there is a "spark" between them, and called him Michelle's "train crush". An EastEnders source said, "It's nothing short of a miracle to get someone to talk to you on the Tube in London, so Michelle should feel extremely flattered!" However, White said that Tom is a stranger to Michelle and she knows nothing about him, she could be "playing with fire". Duncan Lindsay from the Metro said Tom "has turned out to be a little bit unsettling as he has snapped pictures of [Michelle] and followed her home" and said that "many have poured scorn on the likelihood of two strangers regularly bumping into each other on packed London trains, [but] it seems that this was less accidental than we were led to believe". Sophie Dainty from Digital Spy said that Tom "gets even darker" in his fifth episode, and said Michelle "could be heading for serious danger after her new love interest Tom showed another worrying side", calling him a "weirdo" and his behaviour "nasty", as he seems "more and more dangerous by the day".

== Karen Taylor ==
Karen Taylor, played by Lorraine Stanley, first appears in the episode broadcast on 15 June 2017, along with four of her children, Keanu (Danny Walters), Bernadette (Clair Norris), Riley (Tom Jacobs) and Chatham Taylor (Alfie Jacobs). The family also have two pets, a Staffordshire Bull Terrier dog named Bronson and a Bearded lizard named Rooney. Stanley appeared in the 2004 spin off Pat and Mo as a young Mo Harris, and in EastEnders in 2016 as Thelma Bragg, the mother of Linzi Bragg (Amy-Leigh Hickman). On 29 July 2023, it was announced that Stanley had been axed from the show and that Karen would leave in late 2023. She departed on 8 December 2023, and made a one-off guest appearance via a video call on 25 December. On 24 January 2024 it was confirmed Karen's story was not finished and she would return to the series in February for a short stint less than 3 months since her departure. On 22 April 2024 it was confirmed that Stanley will reprise her role as Karen for another brief stint in June.

== Keanu Taylor ==
Keanu Taylor, played by Danny Walters, first appears in the episode broadcast on 15 June 2017, along with his mother Karen Taylor (Lorraine Stanley) and siblings Bernadette (Clair Norris), Riley (Tom Jacobs) and Chatham (Alfie Jacobs). The family also have two pets, a dog named Bronson and a Bearded lizard named Rooney. On 1 November 2019, it was announced that Walters had decided to leave the series; and Keanu's last scenes aired on 3 January 2020. Not long after his departure, he was re-introduced for the 35th anniversary plans. He returned on 7 February and departed again on 21 February. Keanu made an unannounced return on 13 December 2022. Keanu was killed-off on 25 December 2023 after being murdered by Linda Carter (Kellie Bright).

== Bernadette Taylor ==
Bernadette Taylor
- EastEnders character
- Portrayed by: Clair Norris
- Duration: 2017–2025
- First appearance: Episode 5511; 15 June 2017
- Last appearance: Episode 7148; 1 July 2025
- Introduced by: Sean O'Connor
- Spin-off appearances: The Queen Vic Quiz Night (2020)
In-universe information
- Occupation: Newspaper deliverer; Glass collector; Call centre worker; Waitress
- Mother: Karen Taylor
- Half-brothers: Keanu Taylor; Keegan Baker; Riley Taylor; Chatham Taylor
- Half-sisters: Chantelle Atkins
- Sons: Roland Highway
- Aunts: Kandice Taylor
- Nephews: Mackenzie Atkins
- Nieces: Mia Atkins; Peggy Taylor

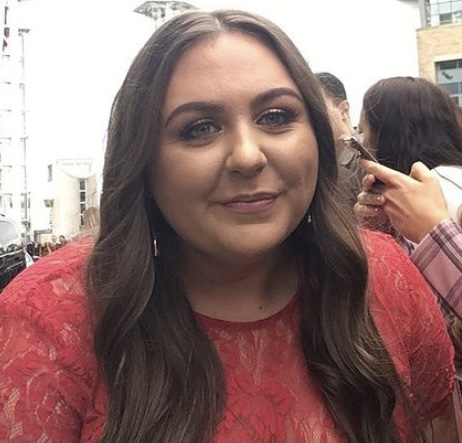
Clair Norris portrayed Bernadette Taylor from 2017 to 2025.

Bernadette Taylor, played by Clair Norris, first appears in the episode broadcast on 15 June 2017, along with her mother Karen Taylor (Lorraine Stanley) and siblings Keanu (Danny Walters), Riley (Tom Jacobs) and Chatham Taylor (Alfie Jacobs). The family also have two pets, a Staffordshire Bull Terrier dog named Bronson and a Bearded lizard named Rooney. On 30 September 2021, it was announced that Norris would take a break for an undisclosed period of time. She exited in the episode broadcast on 8 October 2021. On 22 May 2025, it was announced Bernadette had been axed by new executive producer Ben Wadey with her exit scenes airing later in the year.

Karen, Keanu and Bernadette move to Albert Square and upset the residents with their rowdy behaviour. Bernadette bunks off school to the annoyance of Karen, pretending she is sick. Karen finds Bernadette eating packets of crisps in her room and when Bernadette does not eat her favourite food, Karen confronts Bernadette, working out she is pregnant. Karen takes Bernadette to see Dr Natasha Black (Rachel Bavidge), who confirms the pregnancy. Bernadette cannot work out how far gone she is and Bernadette says she was not forced to have sex, but refuses to name the father. Karen and Bernadette are also told social services will be notified due to Bernadette being underage. Bernadette wants to keep the baby and Karen tries to talk her out of it, but allows Bernadette to make her own choice. When her half-brother Keegan Baker (Zack Morris) and Keanu argue over whether Bernadette is really ill, Karen tells them that Bernadette is pregnant. Keegan calls her stupid whilst Keanu is supportive.

Karen overhears Bernadette talking to Keanu, who Karen thinks may be the baby's father. Bernadette meets up with a schoolfriend, Callum (Shaun Aylward), and tells him she is pregnant and he is the father. Callum becomes emotional and worries about his abusive father's reaction. Bernadette is touched when Callum offers her £16, all he has in his bank account, and laughs when he asks if they should get married. When Ingrid Solberg (Pernille Broch) catches Bernadette destroying flowers in the square, she comforts her when she reveals she is pregnant and was being bullied. Ingrid makes her apologise to Jane Beale (Laurie Brett) for ruining the gardens and agrees to help fix it. Bernadette steals baby clothes from Stacey Fowler (Lacey Turner) and Karen scolds her. Bernadette is delighted that social services think she will be a good mother and when Keanu gives her a moses basket. Keanu manages to convince Bernadette to go to teenage parenting classes and decides to go with her. Bernadette is anxious by the commotion caused by a gas explosion and she is in agony when she miscarries a daughter, which devastates Bernadette, Karen and Keanu. Bernadette is angry towards Karen when she visits her daughter at the hospital without her. Bernadette goes to see her daughter at the hospital and returns home with a box containing her daughter's footprints and is further angry with Karen for allowing the hospital to cremate her. Bernadette asks Callum to meet at the allotments, but Karen decides to do a memorial after speaking to Shirley Carter (Linda Henry). Keegan punches Callum when he realises he is the father, but Callum joins the family for the memorial and Bernadette reveals they were going to name their daughter Belle. When Riley and Chatham return home, they ask questions about the baby.

After her first day back at school, Bernadette arrives home in tears after being bullied by girls saying Bernadette was not pregnant, just fat. Bernadette throws away her stuffed toys as she was going to give them to Belle. Karen then confides in Bernadette about a miscarriage she suffered after her older half-sister, Chantelle. Bernadette arranges to see Callum, but he cancels and she makes a pass at Keegan's friend, Shakil Kazemi (Shaheen Jafargholi), and Keegan walks in on them. Keegan believes Shakil did not make the pass and Bernadette confides in Keegan that she arranged to see Callum and wants another baby as she misses Belle. When Bernadette complains about not having a good phone, Riley takes Stacey's phone from her car and gives it to Bernadette. Later, when Bernadette attempts to unlock the phone, Jane calls before a panic Bernadette puts the phone under the bed. On Halloween, Bex Fowler (Jasmine Armfield) and Louise Mitchell (Tilly Keeper) are forced to include Bernadette in their plans. Bernadette wants to raise money to enable Riley and Chatham to go on a school trip and after helping Martin Fowler (James Bye) on his stall, Honey Mitchell (Emma Barton) offers Bernadette a paper round. Bernadette fails to deliver the paper properly and Honey initially refuses to give Bernadette the full amount, but Bernadette blackmails it out of Honey, as well as extra money. Bernadette impresses Vincent Hubbard (Richard Blackwood) when she asks for a job, but is disappointed that Vincent will not give her a job due to her age. When Bernadette stages a robbery with Riley and Chatham, Vincent offers her a job of glass collecting. On her first shift, she overhears Keanu who has been recruited by Aidan Maguire (Patrick Bergin) in an illegal job with Phil Mitchell (Steve McFadden), Vincent and Mick Carter (Danny Dyer), but agrees to keep quiet. When the Taylors belongings are removed by bailiffs due to Karen failing to repay loans and they can get them back the next day if they can raise £1000, Karen and Bernadette go to visit Karen's sister, Kandice Taylor (Hannah Spearritt). Kandice agrees to loan them the money, but when Karen begins arguing with her, Kandice changes her mind. Bernadette meets up with Kandice and emotionally pleads with Kandice to help, but she apologetically refuses to and when the bailiffs are due to visit, Kandice turns up with the money.

Bernadette is suspended from school takes the blame for Keegan when he smashes Mrs Robyn Lund's (Polly Highton) car window for her seemingly sarcastic reaction to Keegan revising. Bernadette befriends Ted Murray (Christopher Timothy) when she learns to play chess, and Tiffany Butcher (Maisie Smith). Karen and Keanu find one of Ted's chess pieces under Bernadette's bed so accusing him of having an illegal sexual relationship with her, but Bernadette shows them that they have been playing chess. Wanting Bernadette to have friends her own age, Karen pays Keegan to take Bernadette for some fun, but she is hurt when she discovers he posted an embarrassing photo of her online. Keegan apologises, saying that he would have spent time with her even if he was not paid, and tells her not to change. Karen then arranges for Bernadette to spend time with Bex, Louise and Tiffany, but Tiffany sneaks Bernadette away to play chess with Ted. Bernadette plays in a tournament, but is beaten, however, she is asked to join the chess club. Bernadette supports Ted when Joyce Murray (Maggie Steed) is found dead and Ted and Joyce's daughter, Judith Thompson (Emma Fielding), arrives in Walford and is jealous of and annoyed with Bernadette due to parental affection she receives from Ted. Following Shakil's death, Bernadette and the other teenagers play spin the bottle and Tiffany kisses both Bernadette and Keegan, which leads Bernadette to confusion about her feelings, though Tiffany says she likes Keegan.

=== Development ===
The characters and castings were announced on 10 May 2017. Of her casting, Norris said "I'm so excited to go on a journey with my character Bernadette, and to be a part of the Taylor family. I never in a million years thought my first TV role would be in EastEnders. It's surreal but I'm ever so grateful to be given the opportunity and I can't wait to see the audience's reaction to us." Bernadette is described as having "little interest in anything other than sitting around the house and dreaming of being famous." Norris added that her character is "quite young. She's always being forced by her mum to go to school, but she can't be bothered basically" and she is "a typical teenager. She doesn't want to go to school. She just wants to stay around at home and watch reality TV"

Executive producer Sean O'Connor added that he is "hugely excited at the arrival of Karen and her family in Albert Square. They're noisy, brash and not-to-be-messed-with. Karen is a twenty-a-day lioness, bringing up her kids with no support, no money and a very loud mouth. But though they may lack cash, the Taylors have love and warmth in spades. This summer is going to be explosive as the Taylors settle in Walford. The Square will never be quite the same again…" In an interview, O'Connor added that The Taylor family "feel very different to the other characters" they have, calling them "a big messy brood." He said the Taylors will "bring the breath of fresh air that" the Jackson family did upon their arrival and like other established, popular EastEnders families, they "will divide opinion, but within six months, I [O'Connor] think the audience will love them" and "will help re-calibrate what the show is." O'Connor also said that the family experience "the reality of the benefits system [...] we're not going to see these characters suddenly flashing cash round – we're going to see them struggling to make ends meet, because that's where the best stories are- ordinary characters facing adversity." O'Connor compared the characters to Kat Slater (Jessie Wallace) and Coronation Street's Elsie Tanner (Pat Phoenix), saying "whatever fate throws at them, they pick themselves up and face the next day. It's the classic Scarlett O'Hara mantra; 'tomorrow is another day."

The Taylors "are thrown into a [...] crisis" when Karen makes a "shock discovery" about Bernadette and Karen figures out Bernadette is pregnant after Karen is "troubled by Bernadette's behaviour" coming to the "shocking realisation." Bernadette "refuses initially to reveal the father of her unborn child", however, Karen "remains determined to get to the truth." Bernadette's refusal to name the father leaves Karen "more frustrated than ever." Instead of being "the mouthy matriarch" and "gobby", Karen "surprisingly" opts to use "a softer approach" to the situation. Bernadette's silence will prompt Karen's "own suspicions", but she could have "the wrong end of the stick" or uncover a "worrying secret" about Bernadette.

Viewers drew similarities to a teenage pregnancy storyline involving the character of Demi Miller, played by Shana Swash, in 2004 as the Millers "were just as mouthy and controversial as the Taylors and at the time of their arrival, 13-year-old Demi was heavily pregnant. When Bernadette suffers a miscarriage, Daniel Kilkelly from Digital Spy called it a "tragic" and "upsetting" turn.

== Bronson ==
Bronson
- EastEnders character
- Portrayed by: Cyrus (2017); Uncredited (2017–2021)
- Duration: 2017–2021
- First appearance: Episode 5511; 15 June 2017
- Last appearance: Episode 6237; 15 March 2021
- Introduced by: Sean O'Connor
- Species: Dog
In-universe information
- Owner: Taylor family

Bronson is a dog belonging to the Taylor family, Karen Taylor (Lorraine Stanley), Keanu Taylor (Danny Walters), Keegan Baker (Zack Morris), Bernadette Taylor (Clair Norris), Riley Taylor (Tom Jacobs) and Chatham Taylor (Alfie Jacobs). He first appears in the episode broadcast on 15 June 2017, and makes his last appearance in the episode broadcast on 15 March 2021.

The Taylors arrive on Albert Square and upset the residents with their rowdy behaviour. Bronson ends up in the park pond after Kush Kazemi (Davood Ghadami) stops him tugging on Denise Fox's (Diane Parish) bag, which angers Keegan. PC Jaz Jones (Charlie de Melo) arrives at Kush's flat to speak to him about the incident, but Kush does not give a statement. Jaz visits Karen and Keegan, who also refuse to make a complaint. Bronson goes missing during the gas explosion, but Shirley Carter (Linda Henry) finds him in the community centre. When Janet Mitchell (Grace) is knocked over accidentally by Tina Carter (Luisa Bradshaw-White), Janet's father Billy Mitchell (Perry Fenwick) wants to get Janet a dog. Karen agrees that Billy can have Bronson for a few nights for Janet. When Karen fails to repay a loan shark, he comes to remove the family's belongings and takes Bronson, which distresses them. Keanu returns home with Bronson after finding him in the park. In March 2021 Bronson falls ill, and a vet recommends that he be put to sleep, as his body is failing in his old age. Though Bailey Baker (Kara-Leah Fernandes) initially objects, they ultimately go ahead with it, and Bronson dies with the Taylors at his side.

The character was announced on 10 May 2017. Stanley called Bronson's portrayer Cyrus, a cross between a Staffordshire Bull Terrier and Bullmastiff, "beautiful" and "gorgeous". A "specific dog" was chosen to work alongside child actors Alfie and Tom Jacobs. Another dog took on the role of Bronson when Cyrus had a knee operation, but the decision to keep the replacement dog permanently was taken due to Cyrus' health and welfare.

== Riley Taylor ==
Riley Taylor
- EastEnders character
- Portrayed by: Tom Jacobs
- Duration: 2017–2020, 2023
- First appearance: Episode 5511; 15 June 2017
- Last appearance: Episode 6809; 23 November 2023
- Introduced by: Sean O'Connor (2017); Chris Clenshaw (2023)
In-universe information
- Mother: Karen Taylor
- Brothers: Chatham Taylor
- Half-brothers: Keanu Taylor; Keegan Baker
- Half-sisters: Chantelle Atkins; Bernadette Taylor
- Aunts: Kandice Taylor
- Nephews: Mackenzie Atkins; Roland Highway
- Nieces: Mia Atkins; Peggy Taylor

Riley Taylor, played by Tom Jacobs, first appears in the episode broadcast on 15 June 2017, along with his mother Karen Taylor (Lorraine Stanley) and siblings Keanu (Danny Walters), Bernadette (Clair Norris) and Chatham (Alfie Jacobs). The family also have two pets, a Staffordshire Bull Terrier dog named Bronson and a Bearded lizard named Rooney.

Riley and Chatham arrive at the new flat on Albert Square after spending time with their sister, Chantelle. After Bernadette suffers a miscarriage, Riley and Chatham return home from their father's and they ask questions about the baby. When Bernadette complains about not having a good phone, Riley takes Stacey Fowler's (Lacey Turner) from her car and gives it to Bernadette. During Halloween, Riley goes missing with Janet Mitchell (Grace) and Amy Mitchell (Abbie Knowles), but is found in the gardens. Karen panics when Riley and Chatham are not at school to pick up and she finds them at a home with a loan shark, who insults Riley and Chatham's learning difficulties. Chatham and Riley attempt to sell Stacey's phone but eventually return it to her.

The characters and castings were announced on 10 May 2017. Jacobs and his real-life brother, Alfie Jacobs, play the roles of Riley and Chatham, "who can often be a challenge" for Karen as they both have learning difficulties, as they do in real life. Executive producer Sean O'Connor added that he is "hugely excited at the arrival of Karen and her family in Albert Square. They're noisy, brash and not-to-be-messed-with. Karen is a twenty-a-day lioness, bringing up her kids with no support, no money and a very loud mouth. But though they may lack cash, the Taylors have love and warmth in spades. This summer is going to be explosive as the Taylors settle in Walford. The Square will never be quite the same again..."

In an interview, Sean O'Connor added that The Taylor family "feel very different to the other characters" they have, calling them "a big messy brood." He said the Taylors will "bring the breath of fresh air that" the Jackson family did upon their arrival and like other established, popular EastEnders families, they "will divide opinion, but within six months, I [O'Connor] think the audience will love them" and "will help re-calibrate what the show is." O'Connor also said that the family experience "the reality of the benefits system [...] we're not going to see these characters suddenly flashing cash round – we're going to see them struggling to make ends meet, because that's where the best stories are- ordinary characters facing adversity." O'Connor compared the characters to Kat Slater (Jessie Wallace) and Coronation Street's Elsie Tanner (Pat Phoenix), saying "whatever fate throws at them, they pick themselves up and face the next day. It's the classic Scarlett O'Hara mantra; 'tomorrow is another day."

Walters described working with Jacobs and his brother as "incredible" by "seeing the development of them as they grow." Walters said the brothers "were so nervous" on their first day with "all these lights, cameras everything, all the people", but as they began to settle in, they started "to become themselves in the scenes which is beautiful to see."

== Chatham Taylor ==
Chatham Taylor
- EastEnders character
- Portrayed by: Alfie Jacobs
- Duration: 2017–2020, 2023
- First appearance: Episode 5511; 15 June 2017
- Last appearance: Episode 6809; 23 November 2023
- Introduced by: Sean O'Connor (2017); Chris Clenshaw (2023)
In-universe information
- Mother: Karen Taylor
- Brothers: Riley Taylor
- Half-brothers: Keanu Taylor; Keegan Baker
- Half-sisters: Chantelle Atkins; Bernadette Taylor
- Aunts: Kandice Taylor
- Nephews: Mackenzie Atkins; Roland Highway
- Nieces: Mia Atkins; Peggy Taylor

Chatham Taylor, played by Alfie Jacobs, first appears in the episode broadcast on 15 June 2017, along with his mother Karen Taylor (Lorraine Stanley) and siblings Keanu Taylor (Danny Walters), Bernadette Taylor (Clair Norris) and Riley Taylor (Tom Jacobs). The family also have two pets, a Staffordshire Bull Terrier dog named Bronson and a Bearded lizard named Rooney.

Chatham and Riley arrive at the new flat on Albert Square after spending time with their sister, Chantelle. After Bernadette suffers a miscarriage, Chatham and Riley return home from their father's and they ask questions about the baby. Karen panics when Chatham and Riley are not at school to pick up and she finds them at a home with a loan shark, who insults Riley and Chatham's learning difficulties. After Riley takes Stacey Fowler's (Lacey Turner) phone to give to Bernadette, they try to sell it, but eventually return it to Stacey.

The characters and castings were announced on 10 May 2017. Jacobs and his real-life brother, Tom Jacobs, play the roles of Chatham and Riley, "who can often be a challenge" for Karen as they both have learning difficulties, as they do in real life. Executive producer Sean O'Connor added that he is "hugely excited at the arrival of Karen and her family in Albert Square. They're noisy, brash and not-to-be-messed-with. Karen is a twenty-a-day lioness, bringing up her kids with no support, no money and a very loud mouth. But though they may lack cash, the Taylors have love and warmth in spades. This summer is going to be explosive as the Taylors settle in Walford. The Square will never be quite the same again..."

In an interview, Sean O'Connor added that The Taylor family "feel very different to the other characters" they have, calling them "a big messy brood." He said the Taylors will "bring the breath of fresh air that" the Jackson family did upon their arrival and like other established, popular EastEnders families, they "will divide opinion, but within six months, I [O'Connor] think the audience will love them" and "will help re-calibrate what the show is." O'Connor also said that the family experience "the reality of the benefits system [...] we're not going to see these characters suddenly flashing cash round – we're going to see them struggling to make ends meet, because that's where the best stories are- ordinary characters facing adversity." O'Connor compared the characters to Kat Slater (Jessie Wallace) and Coronation Street's Elsie Tanner (Pat Phoenix), saying "whatever fate throws at them, they pick themselves up and face the next day. It's the classic Scarlett O'Hara mantra; 'tomorrow is another day."

Walters described working with Jacobs and his brother as "incredible" by "seeing the development of them as they grow." Walters said the brothers "were so nervous" on their first day with "all these lights, cameras everything, all the people", but as they began to settle in, they started "to become themselves in the scenes which is beautiful to see."

== Ingrid Solberg ==
Ingrid Solberg
- EastEnders character
- Portrayed by: Pernille Broch
- Duration: 2017–2018
- First appearance: Episode 5515; 22 June 2017
- Last appearance: Episode 5702; 7 May 2018
- Introduced by: Sean O'Connor
In-universe information
- Occupation: Au pair

Ingrid Solberg, played by Pernille Broch, first appears in the episode broadcast on 22 June 2017. On 1 May 2018, it was announced that Ingrid would be departing the series with her final scenes airing on 7 May 2018.

After Jack Branning (Scott Maslen) places an advert for an au pair, Ingrid arrives at his house to inquire about the job, although she has the wrong day. Jack lets her in after his daughter, Amy Mitchell (Abbie Knowles) soaks her, and she tells Jack that she lives in Walthamstow, but is from Oslo, and Jack is reluctant to hire her, wanting someone with experience of the area. When Ingrid helps remove chewing gum from Amy's hair without the need to cut it, he offers her a trial. She tries to connect with Amy and Ricky Mitchell (Henri Charles) by cooking a Norwegian meal but fails. They end up bonding when they order a pizza and she tells them a story about Norway. Jack almost misses a meeting when Ingrid is almost late. When Ingrid catches Bernadette Taylor (Clair Morris) destroying flowers, she comforts her when she reveals she is pregnant and is being bullied for her physical appearance, and Ingrid makes her apologise to Jane Beale (Laurie Brett) for ruining her garden. After repeated lateness, Jack asks Ingrid to move in with him and the children, which she happily accepts.

Honey Mitchell (Emma Barton) talks to Ingrid about her upcoming camping trip with her husband Billy Mitchell (Perry Fenwick) and their children Janet Mitchell (Grace) and Will Mitchell (Freddie Phillips), which was overheard by Amy and Ricky. Ingrid tells them that they can come camping too, but Jack is unsure about the idea. However, he later agrees. Ingrid comforts Jack when he is reminded that it is the first family trip without his dead wife Ronnie Mitchell (Samantha Womack). When they begin to grow closer, Ingrid and Jack share a passionate kiss. When Amy and Ricky ask questions about Ingrid and Jack's relationship, she insists that she has no feelings for Jack. Realising that she may have feelings for him, Ingrid decides to leave Walford Jack persuades her to return as the au pair. Ingrid is shocked when she attends an art class to find that her neighbour Keanu Taylor (Danny Walters) is a nude life model. Ingrid and Keanu later begin a relationship. Ingrid is excited when Keanu plans to move in with Jay Brown (Jamie Borthwick), so that they have their own space without being disturbed by Keanu's mother, Karen Taylor (Lorraine Stanley), and is disappointed after Keanu decides not to move because Karen and his siblings need him.

Following the character's introduction, fans of the series believed that there was "an ulterior motive" to her appearance, suggesting that she could be involved in Max Branning's (Jake Wood) revenge plot. Other fans speculated that she could begin a relationship with Jack due to his reputation as a womaniser. Laura-Jayne Tyler of Inside Soap called Ingrid the "demented new nanny", commenting, "Ingrid is the stuff of nightmares. Like when fairy tales used to be genuinely terrifying." Following Ingrid's departure, Tyler voiced her suspicion that there was a storyline planned for Ingrid, but it was cancelled.

== Felix Moore ==
Felix Moore
- EastEnders character
- Portrayed by: George Maguire
- First appearance: Episode 5523; 6 July 2017
- Last appearance: Episode 5618; 19 December 2017
- Introduced by: Sean O'Connor
In-universe information
- Occupation: Market trader

Felix Moore, played by George Maguire, first appears in the episode broadcast on 6 July 2017. He is a customer in Bridge Street Café and asks Kathy Beale (Gillian Taylforth) whom to speak to about renting a stall on the market. He then has drinks in The Queen Victoria with his friends and the pub's staff call them "hipsters". When Donna Yates (Lisa Hammond) is late paying her pitch fees, Robbie Jackson (Dean Gaffney) gives Felix her stall on the market, on which he plans to sell "vintage goods". This leads to the other market traders throwing Robbie in a bin. However Felix is annoyed when Robbie has a change of heart and decides to return the pitch to Donna. Felix continues to appear in Walford however and has since appeared to have obtained a permanent pitch in the market. In October 2017, Felix attends the Halloween party at The Queen Vic and also helps in the search for the children when they disappear from a party at Jack Branning's house. After a customer from the market smashes a 1950s vintage vase worth £100, Robbie insists that the customer does not pay as he is worried that the customer may be a mystery shopper inspecting the market and deciding whether to close it or not. Later, Felix calls Mr. Lister and announces to him and Robbie that he will be leaving the market.

Maguire's casting in EastEnders was reported on 24 June 2017, when it was said that Maguire had signed a £200,000 contract to help increase the show's ratings. However, the Metro said that Maguire would play a "minor character who is part of a small community based storyline", that the actor would be in around three episodes and had already filmed his scenes, and that his casting was nothing to do with the change of executive producer. A different EastEnders source told the Daily Mirror that "George will join the soap for a few episodes early in July".

== Hope Fowler ==
Hope Fowler
- EastEnders character
- Portrayed by: Noach Persell; Frankie Brennan; Isabelle Smith (2020–2025)
- Duration: 2017–2025
- First appearance: Episode 5582; 17 October 2017
- Last appearance: Episode 7200; 2 October 2025
- Introduced by: Sean O'Connor
In-universe information
- Family: Fowler/Slater
- Father: Martin Fowler
- Mother: Stacey Slater
- Stepmother: Ruby Allen; Eve Unwin
- Half-brothers: Arthur Fowler; Roman Fowler
- Half-sisters: Bex Fowler; Lily Slater
- Grandfathers: Arthur Fowler; Brian Slater
- Grandmothers: Pauline Fowler; Jean Slater
- Uncles: Mark Fowler; Sean Slater; Kyle Slater
- Aunts: Michelle Fowler
- Nieces: Charli Slater
- First cousins: Vicki Fowler; Mark Fowler
- Other relatives: Charlie Slater; Kat Slater; Belinda Peacock; Zoe Slater; Hayley Slater; Freddie Slater; Tommy Moon; Bert Moon; Ernie Moon; Cherry Slater; Ian Beale; Tiffany Butcher

Hope Fowler first appears in the episode broadcast on 17 October 2017. She is the daughter of established characters Martin Fowler (James Bye) and Stacey Slater (Lacey Turner).

In early 2017, after Stacey finds out she is pregnant, she and her husband Martin agree to seek medical advice because she is worried about her postpartum psychosis returning that she suffered after the birth of her son, Arthur Fowler. In October 2017, after Arthur's grandmother, Carmel Kazemi (Bonnie Langford), phones social services about bruises on Arthur, suspecting a stressed Stacey of hurting him, Stacey suffers an eclamptic seizure when she learns what Carmel did and is taken to hospital. In between her seizures, Stacey and Martin are told the baby will have to be delivered via Caesarean section. Martin is overjoyed when he learns that he has another daughter, but is told she has complications. Stacey goes to see her daughter, but changes her mind, however, she later sees her. Stacey and Martin's daughter is put on a ventilator. Stacey grows annoyed at Martin suggesting baby names, but confides in Max Branning (Jake Wood) about her feelings. Stacey apologises to Martin and they name their daughter Hope. Martin and Stacey bring Hope home and Stacey decides to make amends with Carmel. When Stacey cheats on Martin with Max in December 2017, she leaves Walford with Arthur, Hope and her daughter, Lily Fowler (Aine Garvey). Stacey returns in January 2018 and when Stacey is out, Martin accuses her of being with Max, so Stacey decides Martin should leave, but he angrily throws her out and exposes her affair. Martin keeps Lily, Arthur and Hope inside, away from Stacey, though he and Stacey support each other briefly when Lily holds Hope by the upstairs window, asking for Stacey. Martin rejects Stacey when she says Lily, Arthur and Hope need her and he decides he will not let Stacey near Lily, Arthur and Hope. Martin decides to go for custody, although his friends advise them to resolve their problems. Martin is not happy when Stacey seemingly changes her mind about Martin looking after Lily, Arthur and Hope for the night, but he refuses to look after Hope when Stacey offers as he suspects she will see Max. Stacey's cousin, Hayley Slater (Katie Jarvis), gets involved by pretending to be interested in Martin and encouraging him to keep the children for longer than agreed, resulting in him being visited by the police.

Turner said that Stacey's ultimate fear is her baby not surviving after Stacey suffers pre-eclampsia, bringing on a seizure, which puts Stacey and her baby's life at risk. The character being named Hope drew similarities to the introduction of Coronation Street's Hope Stape, the daughter of Fiz Brown (Jennie McAlpine), who was born prematurely and fought for her life in December 2010.

== Aidan Maguire ==
Aidan Maguire
- EastEnders character
- Portrayed by: Patrick Bergin
- Duration: 2017–2018
- First appearance: Episode 5605; 27 November 2017
- Last appearance: Episode 5668; 9 March 2018
- Introduced by: John Yorke
In-universe information
- Father: Joseph Maguire
- Brothers: Connor Maguire
- Wife: Ciara Maguire (backstory)

Aidan Joseph Patrick "JP" Maguire, played by Patrick Bergin made his first appearance on 27 November 2017. He is part of a robbery storyline. Aidan departed the series on 9 March 2018 at the conclusion of his storyline.

Aidan arrives in Albert Square and sees Keegan Baker (Zack Morris) arguing with his half-sister Bernadette Taylor (Clair Norris) over money and he advises Keegan not to display his anger as it shows weakness. Aidan visits Phil Mitchell (Steve McFadden), his former prison cellmate, and later Phil sees him shaking hands with Vincent Hubbard (Richard Blackwood). The next day, Aidan tells Phil about his criminal plan with Vincent and Phil asks to be involved; Aidan says he will be in touch. Aidan, Phil and Vincent meet to discuss Aidan's plan, but Phil does not want to work with Vincent; Aidan says the team is his choice and later Phil tells Aidan he is still interested. When Aidan is mugged for his phone and injured, Mick Carter (Danny Dyer) helps him and as they talk. Aidan mentions the planned robbery and Mick is interested as he needs money. Keegan then hands Aidan his phone, revealing the mugging was a scam to get Mick and Aidan talking. Aidan then recruits Keanu Taylor (Danny Walters) into his team; Aidan, Phil, Vincent, Mick and Keanu then have a meeting in Vincent's bar, the Albert, but Bernadette walks in as they are discussing the plan; she insists she has heard nothing, but Max Branning (Jake Wood) sees them leaving together and is suspicious. When Phil's son Ben Mitchell (Harry Reid) is beaten up by Luke Browning (Adam Astill), Phil asks Aidan for help; Luke is bundled into the back of a van and not seen again. Vincent is angry about Aidan's meetings being in the Albert so he tells Aidan he does not want to be involved; Aidan convinces him that he is the right person for the job while also making a threat, so Vincent agrees to come back on board. Mick misses a meeting with Aidan because of his family, and later Aidan tells him one thing has changed and gives him a gun. Mick hides the gun from his wife, Linda Carter (Kellie Bright), but she finds it and he is forced to reveal that Aidan is planning a robbery; she tells him to return the gun or she will leave him. Mick returns the gun to Aidan, saying he will not take part in the plan, and Aidan meets Billy Mitchell (Perry Fenwick) and thinks he could be a good replacement for Mick. Aidan gives Whitney Carter (Shona McGarty) a present for Mick, which she puts under Mick's Christmas tree, and Aidan tells Mick there is a gun in the Vic and he has called the police; Mick manages to find it under the tree and gives it to Billy to give to Phil as the police arrive, but Aidan only reported a fight so the police leave. Aidan later tells Mick he needs him back on his team and he could make £150,000. The day before the heist, Mick asks Aidan to rejoin the gang but Aidan makes him beg, so Mick refuses, however, when the others get drunk, Aidan agrees to have Mick back.

Aidan talks Phil, Mick, Vincent and Keanu through his heist plan and tells them to be ready; when Aidan signals for everyone to take their positions, Mick's mother, Shirley Carter (Linda Henry), locks him in the cellar after reading his text messages. Keegan helps Mick escape the cellar so Shirley gets Linda and they track his phone. Mick joins Keanu and they successfully stop a van and divert it to Albert Square. The van stops outside the garage owned by Ben, and Mick, Keanu, Vincent and Phil use fake guns to hold up the van; the men in the back open the van and Mick is shot as Linda and Shirley look on. Bernadette calls the police, while Aidan sends Keanu home and then threatens Vincent because when he was a police informant, he had Aidan's brother sent to prison and Aidan blames Vincent for his brother's suicide; Phil stops Aidan shooting Vincent and Vincent promises to sell his bar, the Albert, and give Aidan the proceeds. Aidan's former wife, Ciara Maguire (Denise McCormack), arrives and tells the police that she owns the van involved and she staged a robbery as part of security training, so convinces the police to leave; Ciara realises Aidan was involved and makes a phone call to someone. Two days later, Vincent worries that nobody will receive their share of the money so Aidan assures him that if they are patient they will get it. Ciara meets Aidan, accusing him or arranging the robbery, but he denies being involved; Phil recognises her and confronts Aidan; Aidan says they are taking back his money that she took from him, and tells Phil where the money is.

Aidan offers to share the money with Ciara, and later meets with Vincent, Keanu, Mick, Phil and Billy, who is hiding the money in a coffin; when they open the coffin, the money is missing. Billy realises there has been a mix-up and the money has been buried in another coffin; Aidan makes them dig up the coffin. Ciara goes to meet Aidan as agreed but he is not there, so she goes to Billy's funeral home where Aidan has been conducting his business but Billy's fiancée, Honey Mitchell (Emma Barton), assumes she is a customer and takes her to the Vic; Ciara overhears Honey on the phone to Billy and realises Aidan is at a church, so calls him, interrupting a confrontation between Vincent and Aidan; Ciara lies that she knows exactly where Aidan is; the men open the coffin but the money is not there; sirens approach and Aidan tells everyone to run. Ben and Jay Brown (Jamie Borthwick) find a bracelet at the garage and a police officer visits, so they realise Phil has done something illegal; they confront Phil's wife, Sharon Mitchell (Letitia Dean), and Ben demands a share of any money as he is now involved but Sharon says Phil was double-crossed, however, Ben later hides the bracelet along with other jewellery and a large amount of cash, revealing that he has stolen it. Ben sells the jewellery but gives one necklace to his mother, Kathy Beale (Gillian Taylforth). Ben tells Jay that he will give the cash to Phil.

Everyone goes into hiding for a few weeks and when they return, Phil sees Kathy's necklace and thinks Ben and Jay took the money. The men gather at Phil's and accuse each other of the theft, while Aidan says the woman they robbed does not have the money as her "blonde bombshell" is looking for it; Aidan then offers to help Mick get his money to buy The Queen Victoria pub back, but Mick calls Aidan a liar and wants nothing more to do with him; Billy then tells Phil that the "blonde bombshell" is Mel Owen (Tamzin Outhwaite) and Phil says they need to find Ben. Mick is able to keep the pub when Halfway (Tony Clay), who was the person who shot Mick, gives him a ring he stole during the robbery, which is worth £200,000. Aidan finds out Mick has bought the Vic and Mick's son, Johnny Carter (Ted Reilly) tells Aidan that they sold a family member's war medal; Aidan believes the story but Mel speaks to Halfway who says they won the money on a scratchcard, so when Mel tells Aidan this, he is furious. Phil sees Vincent being friendly with a police officer after a break-in at the Albert that was staged by Aidan and notices how on-edge he is all day, while Aidan sees Mick celebrating and that the Vic is suddenly running smoothly after the Carters faced eviction, so Phil and Aidan agree that Vincent or Mick are guilty of taking the money; Mick is then bundled into a van by two men. Mick is taken to the garage where Phil, Aidan, Vincent, Keanu and Billy confront him; he convinces Aidan that the Vic was returned to them for nothing, so Aidan turns his attention to Vincent; Vincent accuses Ben, while Phil accuses Mel. Aidan gives Phil ten days to find out the truth; Mel then overhears Phil telling Sharon that if Aidan knew who had the money, there would be a "bloodbath". Mel discovers that Sharon took the money and it is returned to Ciara.

Vincent tries to hurry through the sale of the Albert and tells Aidan that he will have his money in four weeks but Aidan demands an immediate bank transfer and has Vincent beaten up when he refuses. Eventually, Aidan buys the bar himself for £1. Aidan then has a drug dealer, Cal (Jesse Rutherford) installed at the Vic. Mick tries to stop the drug dealing but Aidan threatens to take the Vic from the Carters and to harm members of his family. When Linda discovers the drug dealing, Mick explains that Aidan is behind it and he took the Albert from Vincent so they have no choice but to allow it. Linda wants to report Aidan to the police but Mick says it would endanger their lives; Aidan then gives Mick money for his silence, but Linda returns it, however, Aidan has conned a supplier meaning Mick needs the money to pay them; Mick nearly goes to the police but changes his mind after finding out Aidan contacted his daughter, Nancy Carter (Maddy Hill); Linda then calls the police. Aidan gives Keanu a box to hide in a coffin at the funeral home while he is fixing the electricity there. The following day the pub is raided and Cal is arrested, but Aidan pretends not to know anything. He later confronts the Carters, knowing one of them called the police. Shirley and Mick both try to take the blame, but Linda admits it was her so Aidan threatens her. Mick defends her and refuses to give in to him. Aidan warns him he has a week to get him the robbery money or else he is a dead man. Aidan later covers Mick's son Ollie with petrol as a warning. Jay gives the box Aidan gave Keanu to Phil. Upon opening it, Phil discovers some removed teeth.

The following week, Mick and the Carters prepare to flee Walford to escape Aidan and his gang, but Mick returns to the Vic at the last minute to confront Aidan, who viciously beats him until he apologises and allows drug dealing to resume in the Vic. Jack, Linda, and several others quickly arrive to aid Mick, only to find themselves surrounded by an even larger group of thugs called in by Aidan, who then threatens to burn the pub down. Mick finally apologises after seeing no way out, but Aidan is quickly attacked by Phil, who insists he has gone too far with his actions. Knowing that the teeth in the box belong to Luke, who Aidan had killed despite Phil only requesting to scare him off, Phil threatens to hand them over to the police unless Aidan ceases his actions and leaves. Heartbroken at Phil's betrayal, and feeling helpless entirely, Aidan finally calls off his gang and quietly leaves for good.

The character is described as a charismatic old school villain and is an old friend of Phil Mitchell, having shared a cell together while Phil was in prison in 2005. Speaking of joining the show, Bergin said: "I am delighted to be joining EastEnders as I have watched and admired it since the days of Dirty Den. It is an iconic show that has the ability to shape the way people think, while also telling big explosive stories that keep the audience gripped. I am really looking forward to seeing what they have in store for Aidan as it's bound to be dramatic." Executive consultant John Yorke added: "EastEnders deserves the very best and in Patrick we are absolutely privileged to have a truly great actor join the show. It's a huge honour to have him on board, where he'll be working hand in hand with Phil Mitchell and Mick Carter to carry a truly explosive storyline for Christmas and New Year. We can't wait to get started."

== Kandice Taylor ==
Kandice Taylor
- EastEnders character
- Portrayed by: Hannah Spearritt
- Duration: 2017–2018
- First appearance: Episode 5626; 28 December 2017
- Last appearance: Episode 5838; 27 December 2018
- Introduced by: John Yorke
In-universe information
- Sisters: Karen Taylor
- Husband: Malcolm
- Daughters: Princess
- Nephews: Keanu Taylor; Keegan Baker; Chatham Taylor; Riley Taylor
- Nieces: Chantelle Atkins; Bernadette Taylor

Kandice Taylor, played by Hannah Spearritt, first appears in the two episodes first broadcast on 28 December 2017. She then appears in the episodes first broadcast between 16 and 20 July, and returns again in December 2018. She is the younger sister of established character Karen Taylor (Lorraine Stanley).

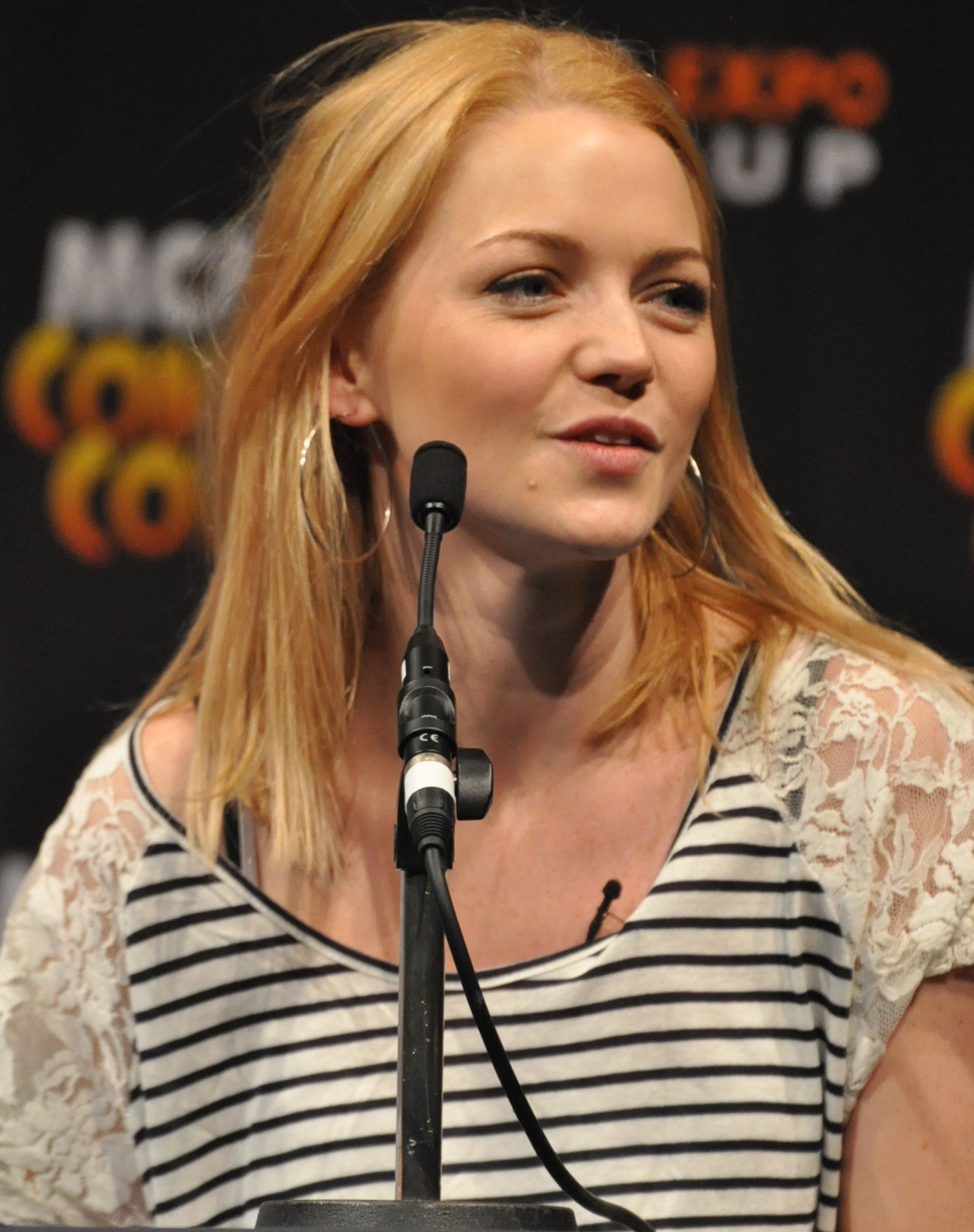
Hannah Spearritt appeared across three guest stints as Kandice Taylor.

When the Taylors' belongings are removed by bailiffs due to Karen failing to repay loans and they can get them back the next day if they can raise £1,000, Karen and her daughter, Bernadette Taylor (Clair Norris), go to visit Kandice. Kandice agrees to lend them the money, but when Karen begins arguing with her, Kandice changes her mind. Bernadette meets up with Kandice and emotionally pleads with her to help, but she apologetically refuses to but when the bailiffs are due to visit, Kandice turns up with the money. After bickering again and Karen throwing the money back, Kandice and Karen make up.

Kandice arrives in Walford in July 2018 and asks Karen for help to get out of climbing Mont Blanc for charity by allowing her to stay for a few days. Karen, Bernadette and Karen's son, Keegan Baker (Zack Morris), agree to help her by pretending she is ill. After successfully fooling her supporters with fake photos, the golf club director, Ellie James (Helen Masters), asks Kandice for a video call to show her supporters. Kandice and Karen set up a tent in Karen's flat for the call and Ellie believes Kandice until Keegan accidentally interrupts. Ellie visits Karen and Kandice the next day, and Kandice shows her a cheque for the golf club, which Ellie accepts in exchange for keeping quiet about the scam and giving Kandice's husband, Malcolm (Greg Haiste) a gold membership to the golf club.

The character and Spearritt's casting was announced on 25 October 2017. Kandice was billed as the "outspoken" younger sister of Karen. She initially appeared for a stint, with the possibility of reintroducing the character if she proved popular. The following day, promotional images of Kandice and behind-the-scenes images of Spearritt filming with Stanley and Norris were released. It was also reported that Kandice would make her first appearance at Christmas 2017.

On 24 April 2018, it was announced that Spearritt would reprise the role for another guest appearance later in 2018. The character's July 2018 return was described as a "comedy plot". A third stint over Christmas 2018 was announced on 4 December 2018.

== Abi Branning ==
Abi Branning
- EastEnders character
- Duration: 2017–2021
- First appearance: Episode 5628; 29 December 2017
- Last appearance: Episode 6224; 19 February 2021
- Introduced by: John Yorke
In-universe information
- Other names: AJ Branning
- Family: Branning/Beale
- Father: Steven Beale
- Mother: Abi Branning
- Grandfathers: Max Branning; Simon Wicks
- Grandmothers: Tanya Branning; Cindy Beale
- Uncles: Peter Beale; Oscar Branning
- Aunts: Lauren Branning; Lucy Beale; Cindy Williams; Gina Knight; Anna Knight; Annie Carter
- First cousins: Louie Beale; Beth Williams
- Other relatives: Rainie Cross; Cora Cross; Jack Branning; David Wicks; Pat Butcher

Abi Branning (also known as AJ Branning) first appears in the episode broadcast on 29 December 2017. She is the daughter of Abi Branning (Lorna Fitzgerald) and Steven Beale (Aaron Sidwell).

Abi and Steven's baby is conceived during their affair, while Steven is in a relationship with her mother's sister, Lauren Branning (Jacqueline Jossa). Shortly afterwards, Steven dies after being injured in a fire caused by Abi's father Max Branning (Jake Wood). The baby is delivered via caesarean section after her mother becomes brainstem dead following a fall with Lauren from the roof of The Queen Victoria public house. She is held by Max after being born. Max and Lauren visit her and discuss naming her. Max later visits her in the hospital and takes a photograph of her, but is told that she is not strong enough to go to her mother's funeral. Her great-uncle, Jack Branning (Scott Maslen), visits the hospital after her great-grandmother, Cora Cross (Ann Mitchell), suggests that Max would kidnap the baby as punishment for being banned from the funeral. Jack arrives at the hospital and finds the incubator is empty. He presumes that Max has taken her, although Max returns with her and explains that he has registered her birth, naming her Abi in memory of her mother, and that he wants to do things right. After Max returns to Walford after a break away, he and his new wife, Abi's great-aunt Rainie Branning (Tanya Franks), visit Abi, who is being cared for by Cora, and vows to get her back. Max and Rainie meet with Abi's social worker, Calvin Hoskins (Colin Tierney), and use Jack's house to convince him they are suitable to raise Abi and after the meeting, Rainie and Max row about Rainie potentially ruining Max's plan to raise Abi. Abi's social worker visits Max and Rainie again to discuss their marriage, which could be considered unstable due to the short time they have been married, about Max's contemplated suicide, though Max insists he is stronger and promised to bring up Abi. Max and Rainie are asked for three references and although Jack agrees to be the family referee, other residents are unwilling to support Max, but Max's former daughter-in-law Stacey Fowler (Lacey Turner) and her husband Martin Fowler (James Bye) agree to be referees. Cora visits Rainie and Max and offers Rainie the chance to leave Max, relocate to Exeter, run a tearoom and be part of Abi's upbringing with her and Abi's maternal grandmother, Tanya Cross (Jo Joyner). Rainie accepts the offer for £30,000, but contacts Calvin and when social services visit, Max and Rainie inform them of Cora's bribe.

When Cora visits Ian Beale (Adam Woodyatt), Abi's step-grandfather, Cora puts Ian on the spot by claiming he is supporting custody application to Max and Rainie. When Max takes Abi from Cora whilst Rainie attempts to resolve their feud, Abi is removed to a place of safety by the police. After Cora strikes Rainie over the head with a frying pan, Rainie blackmails Cora into withdrawing her custody application and Abi is placed into Max and Rainie's care.

Abi and Steven begin their affair when Steven suspects Abi's sister and Steven's girlfriend Lauren of having an affair with her employer, Josh Hemmings (Eddie Eyre), that has led to "tension" between the characters, especially with the discovery that Lauren terminated her pregnancy. In the climax of Steven's lie of having an inoperable brain tumour with just a few months to live, Steven's stepmother Jane Beale (Laurie Brett) discovers his affair with Abi. Abi's pregnancy puts a "massive spanner in the works of this slow-burning epic plot, which is quite literally about to blow up" as it provides a "new crisis" for Steven. With Abi being "even more hateful" towards Lauren after Steven's death, Abi receives a "world of hate" from Lauren upon admitting to the affair. Fitzgerald said that Abi is "just so happy" to be having a baby so she can receive "unconditional love", which Abi longs for as she "keeps losing that" within her family and with the death of Steven." Although Lauren is "fuming" in the aftermath of learning about Abi's baby, Fitzgerald states that Abi regards it as a "relief [...] she's got this massive weight off her chest." The hatred between Abi and Lauren comes out in an "explosive" manner, with the anger coming from Abi's betrayal and not Steven's and the fact the baby "will be too much as it means Steven will be around forever."

== Other characters ==
| Character | Date(s) | Actor | Circumstances |
|---|---|---|---|
| DI Sara Devenport | 2 January | Gillian Kirkpatrick | A police officer investigating the deaths of Ronnie Branning (Samantha Womack) and Roxy Mitchell (Rita Simons). |
| DS Kye Anderson | 2–9 January (3 episodes) | Jonathan Harden | A police officer investigating the deaths of Ronnie Branning (Samantha Womack) and Roxy Mitchell (Rita Simons). With his colleague DI Sara Devenport (Gillian Kirkpatrick), he informs Ronnie's husband Jack Branning (Scott Maslen) of their deaths and acts as Jack's family liaison officer. The next day, he visits Jack, telling him that CCTV footage shows Ronnie diving into the swimming pool after Roxy, where they both died. DS Anderson then accompanies Jack to identify their bodies. Kye later tells Jack and Glenda Mitchell (Glynis Barber), Ronnie and Roxy's mother, that the coroner's report shows that Ronnie drowned and Roxy drowned following a cardiac arrest in the swimming pool, leading Jack to conclude that Roxy's cocaine habit was to blame for both deaths, though DS Anderson attempts to tell Jack that there is no evidence that Ronnie died trying to save Roxy. |
| Bev Mills | 2 January | Uncredited | A customer of Bridge Street Café who is an old friend of Kathy Beale's (Gillian Taylforth). Kathy tells her son Ian Beale (Adam Woodyatt) that Bev, who lives in Walford Towers, has had a compulsory purchase order placed on her flat. |
| Emily | 13 January | Uncredited | A nurse that takes away Denise Fox's (Diane Parish) newborn baby boy, so he can be put up for adoption. |
| DC Manners | 20 January – 2 February (2 episodes) | David Semark | An undercover police officer who poses as a customer in The Queen Victoria public house after Kathy Beale (Gillian Taylforth) reports The Queen Vic for selling alcohol outside of licensing hours. Kathy overhears him making a phone call and mentioning Mick Carter (Danny Dyer), Linda Carter (Kellie Bright) and Shirley Carter (Linda Henry). Kathy admits to Manners that she made the complaint, and tells him that only Babe Smith (Annette Badland) was selling alcohol illegally. Manners later visits the pub for breakfast, and Babe serves him a beer, still unaware that he is a police officer. |
| Aaron Palmer | 20 January | Jude Clark | The son of Tony, a man Phil Mitchell (Steve McFadden) befriended when they were waiting for liver transplants, but his father died. Aaron meets up with Phil in the café and Phil gives him money for new trainers. |
| Antoinette Giroux | 20–31 January (2 episodes) | Frédérique Feder | The widow of Tony, a man Phil Mitchell (Steve McFadden) befriended when they were waiting for liver transplants. Antoinette visits Phil to give back the money he gave to her son, Aaron Palmer (Jude Clark) for new trainers. She then tells him not to contact her son again and threatens to call the police if he does so. Antoinette later visits Phil, after he leaves her a note, and apologises for what she said before. |
| John Dixon | 23 January | Kieron Jecchinis | A man who speaks to market inspector Carmel Kazemi (Bonnie Langford) about the future of the market stalls. |
| Mary Scholes | 24–26 January (2 episodes) | Victoria Gee | Mary is a woman who tries to find her son Lewis who is missing after a bus crashes into the market and the viaduct. Honey Mitchell (Emma Barton) tries to comfort her. Lewis is eventually found safe and unharmed. |
| Lewis | 26 January | Uncredited | Mary is a woman who tries to find her son Lewis who is missing after a bus crashes into the market and the viaduct. Honey Mitchell (Emma Barton) tries to comfort her. Lewis is eventually found safe and unharmed. |
| Paul | 26 January – 9 May (2 episodes) | Paul Bradbury | A jewellery stall holder who is unaccounted for after the bus crash but is later found by Carmel Kazemi (Bonnie Langford) in The Queen Victoria public house (uncredited). Denise Fox (Diane Parish) sells her necklace to him for five pounds (credited as "jewellery stall holder"). |
| Nurse Laura Barnes | 26 January – 30 March (2 episodes) | Nicola Weeks | A nurse who Stacey Fowler (Lacey Turner) asks if she has seen her husband Martin Fowler (James Bye) after he gets out of his hospital bed. She later treats Kush Kazemi (Davood Ghadami) after he suffers from a dislocated shoulder following his involvement in a car crash caused by Michelle Fowler (Jenna Russell). |
| Panit | 30–31 January (2 episodes) | Yo Santhaveesuk | A Thai chef who Mick Carter (Danny Dyer) employs to cook The Queen Victoria public house's Chinese buffet. The next day he attends the pub's quiz night with his family. |
| Gary | 2 February | Dean Kilbey | A customer in The Queen Victoria public house at breakfast time. He asks Babe Smith (Annette Badland) for alcohol but she tells him it is too early to serve alcohol. He gets up to leave, so Babe adds a shot of alcohol to his coffee and asks Gary not to say anything. |
| Alan Robinson | 2 February | Chris Bell | A contractor who Mick Carter (Danny Dyer) hires to repair the pub's leaking roof. Alan tells Mick that he will need to purchase a new roof. Ian Beale (Adam Woodyatt) later reveals to Kathy Beale (Gillian Taylforth) that Alan is a cowboy builder who will over-charge Mick. He asks Kathy not to tell Mick as revenge for him telling everyone that Ian was drunk. |
| Mrs Robyn Lund | 6 February 2017– 26 March 2018 (9 episodes) | Polly Highton | The headteacher of Walford High School, who meets with Carmel Kazemi (Bonnie Langford) and her son, Shakil Kazemi (Shaheen Jafargholi), after Shakil is involved in a violent fight with Zayan Scott (Alex Blake). She later meets with Martin Fowler (James Bye) and his daughter Bex Fowler (Jasmine Armfield) after Keegan Baker (Zack Morris) uploads a fake porn video of Bex. Lund asks Bex if she knows who made the video but Bex says she does not. Lund informs Martin that the police will be involved. The next day, Lund meets with Martin, Bex and police officers, where Martin discovers that the video was probably made in revenge for a nude photo of Shakil that was sent from Bex's phone. Lund tells Martin that Bex's mock GCSE results were uncharacteristically poor, and that sharing an indecent image of a minor is a criminal offence so Bex will be interviewed under caution. Lund then meets Carmel and Shakil again to discuss the situation. Lund finds Bex in a state in the toilets, Bex admits to her and Mr Gethin Pryce (Cerith Flinn) Madison Drake and Alexandra D'Costa (Seraphina Beh and Sydney Craven) bullied her, and that Louise Mitchell (Tilly Keeper) sent the explicit photo of Shakil. Louise, Madison and Alexandra deny any involvement. At the showcase, when Bex looks for a replacement guitar string, Madison and Alexandra pin Bex up against a wall. Shakil hears the bullying through headphones and exposes it through the soundboard. Mrs Lund orders Madison and Alexandra to her office and later asks Louise and Bex to make statements against them. Keegan is annoyed with Lund's seemingly sarcastic reaction to him revising and smashes a brick through her car window, which his half-sister Bernadette Taylor (Clair Norris) takes the blame for and is suspended. When Keegan is suspended from school for three days, she is invited to the flat by Keegan's father, Mitch Baker (Roger Griffiths), who gets Keegan to apologise and she reduces his suspension to one day. |
| Sgt Sharon Bayes | 7 February 2017 – 17 October 2019 | Alison Egan | A police officer who charges Mick Carter (Danny Dyer), Shirley Carter (Linda Henry) and Babe Smith (Annette Badland) with breaching the licence of The Queen Victoria public house. She reappears and is seen looking after Rainie Branning (Tanya Franks) after she is arrested.} |
| Mr Omar Wright | 9 February | Damola Adelaja | The pathologist at the inquest into the deaths of sisters Ronnie Branning (Samantha Womack) and Roxy Mitchell (Rita Simons). He establishes that although cocaine may have impaired Roxy's judgement when she jumped into a swimming pool, the combination of cold water immersion would likely to have caused her cardiac arrest. |
| Nathan | 13 February | Jamie Knox | A college student who lives next door to Carmel Kazemi (Bonnie Langford). Carmel meets him on the market and tells him to stop putting rubbish outside her house, but he says it is not a big deal. Later, he goes to The Albert bar, where Michelle Fowler (Jenna Russell) flirts with him. Nathan flirts back until Jay Brown (Jamie Borthwick) tells him to back off. Carmel later complains to the council and the students are evicted. |
| Nurse Gemma Bardon | 21 February | Gail Kemp | A nurse that Ian Beale (Adam Woodyatt) visits for a health check. She refers him to his GP. |
| Sian Davies | 23 February | Jean Trend | A woman and her husband who Dot Branning (June Brown) meets in a garden centre. |
| Bob Davies | 23 February | Uncredited | A woman and her husband who Dot Branning (June Brown) meets in a garden centre. |
| Sergeant Lucius Hamilton | 24 February | Simon Lenagan | A police officer who attends the scene where Dot Branning (June Brown) has driven into a road verge after driving through a no entry sign. He informs Dot that she needs to notify the DVLA about her failing eyesight and that she cannot drive until further notice. |
| Bob | 24 February | Munro Graham | A plumber who Mick Carter (Danny Dyer) asks for a quote to fix a leak in the roof of The Queen Victoria public house. |
| Marcus Leask | 24 February | Jamie Nichols | A journalist from the Walford Gazette who visits Denise Fox (Diane Parish) at her request to write an article about how the lack of community spirit effects people in Walford. |
| Samuel Philpott | 2–17 March (2 episodes) | George Churchill | A geeky student at Walford High School who eats his lunch alone. Madison Drake and Alexandra D'Costa (Seraphina Beh and Sydney Craven) tell Bex Fowler (Jasmine Armfield) that she should sit with him, joking that it is the "VIP area", but Bex tells them that she will sit somewhere else. Later, when Bex is put into isolation at school, Samuel meets her and Bex assumes he is also in isolation until he reveals that Madison and Alexandra told him that Bex would have sex with anybody, causing her to walk out of school. |
| Justin Fairbrass | 3 March | Paul Jacobs | An employee of Stedford Bank who comes to The Queen Victoria public house to assess if the bank can offer Mick Carter (Danny Dyer) a business loan. The bank cannot offer Mick any money because he is currently in debt, and when Justin offers him the right to appeal, Mick tells him to leave. |
| DS Yasmin Khodeir | 7–9 March (2 episodes) | Sirene Saba | A police officer investigating a porn video with Bex Fowler's (Jasmine Armfield) face imposed on the model's body being circulated around Walford High School and an explicit image of Shakil Kazemi (Shaheen Jafargholi). Khodeir tells Bex and her father, Martin Fowler (James Bye) that Bex will be interviewed under caution in the presence of an appropriate adult. Khodeir visits the Fowlers with social worker Luke Ayshford (Sean Michael Verey) to ask Bex about explicit photos she took of herself, which she deleted but that were backed up to the cloud, and to assess Bex's living situation. |
| PC Annika Fairbank | 7 March | Jessica Butler | A police officer investigating a porn video with Bex Fowler's (Jasmine Armfield) face imposed on the model's body being circulated around Walford High School and an explicit image of Shakil Kazemi (Shaheen Jafargholi). She takes Bex's phone as evidence. |
| Luke Ayshford | 7–9 March (2 episodes) | Sean Michael Verey | A social worker who sits with Bex Fowler (Jasmine Armfield) at school when the police investigate a porn video with Bex's face imposed on the model's body and an explicit image of Shakil Kazemi (Shaheen Jafargholi). Luke visits the Fowlers with DS Yasmin Khodeir (Sirene Saba) to ask Bex about explicit photos she took of herself, which she deleted but that were backed up to the cloud, and to assess Bex's living situation. |
| Debbie Morton | 14 March – 4 April (3 episodes) | Beth Cordingly | A prisoner who shares a cell with Shirley Carter (Linda Henry) and tells Shirley not to think about her family as it makes being in prison harder. After Shirley disagrees Debbie pours Shirley's tobacco down the toilet and continues to taunt her. Later, when Shirley tells Debbie that she does not want to make any enemies, Debbie tells her it is too late. When Shirley's sister Tina Carter (Luisa Bradshaw-White) visits Shirley to inform her of their mother Sylvie Carter's (Linda Marlowe) death, Debbie overhears and when they return to the cell she teases Shirley about her feelings, causing Shirley to beat her up. |
| Charles Bowman | 21 March | Theo Toksvig-Stewart | The team captain of a quiz team called "The Emergency Brexits" who attends a pub quiz at The Queen Victoria. He incorrectly answers the tiebreaker question about Five and Kim Fox-Hubbard's (Tameka Empson) team wins. |
| Ivy | 27 March | Shirley Dixon | A charity shop employee who agrees to allow Tina Carter (Luisa Bradshaw-White) and her dementia-suffering mother, Sylvie Carter (Linda Marlowe), to look for a dress for Sylvie despite the shop closing in five minutes. Sylvie is confused and insults Ivy's age, and Ivy asks them to leave but Tina says Sylvie is just having a bad day, so Ivy allows Sylvie to get changed into the dress she picked, as she is on her way to a party. |
| Nurse Nicole Wade | 30 March | Marta Kielkowicz | A nurse that tells Martin Fowler (James Bye) that he cannot behave in the way he has while he is in the hospital. She tells Martin and Kathy Beale (Gillian Taylforth) that as soon as there is news they will let them know. |
| Dr Aaron Kent | 30 March | Richard Clements | A doctor that tells Martin Fowler (James Bye) and Preston Cooper (Martin Anzor) that Michelle Fowler (Jenna Russell) has broken ribs and a damaged spleen following a car accident and that they will have to perform and emergency procedure. |
| Pru Garcia | 3 April | Liz Sutherland | A ward hostess who tries to encourage Michelle Fowler (Jenna Russell) to eat, but Michelle refuses. She sees a photo of Preston Cooper (Martin Anzor) on Michelle's phone and asks if he is her son, but Michelle does not answer. Later, Pru brings sandwiches and Michelle eats this time, and Pru thanks Michelle's friend Sharon Mitchell (Letitia Dean) for getting her to eat, to which Sharon says she told Michelle something she wanted to hear, which Pru said was good, but Sharon admits that she has not told Michelle the whole truth, so Pru encourages her to do so before she finds out from someone else. Sharon also asks Pru to borrow a phone charger for Michelle's phone. Later, Pru witnesses Michelle smashing her phone after she fails to contact Preston, so Pru comforts her and mends the phone. Michelle tells her that Preston is not her son but her lover, to which Pru says "good on you". |
| "Hellraiser" | 4 April | Oli Regan | A person who arrives at Jay Brown (Jamie Borthwick) and Ben Mitchell's (Harry Reid) flat to be interviewed to become a lodger. He is covered in piercings and tattoos and Jay and Ben decide not to take him on. |
| Traffic PC Patrice Newbold | 4 April | Stacey Norris | A police officer who interviews Michelle Fowler (Jenna Russell) about her car crash into the fish and chip shop. Although Newbold says that Michelle was not over the legal drinking limit, she had sleeping pills in her system and asks why she allowed herself to drive, to which Michelle says she was not advised not to drive and thought the pills would only calm her down. Newbold tells her that, although she has not been arrested for or charged with any offence, the Crown Prosecution Service will assess if she should be charged. When Michelle says she may not be in the country, Newbold confiscates Michelle's passport. |
| Gary Green | 6 April | Patrick Myles | A man from Walford Council who visits Tina Carter (Luisa Bradshaw-White), assuming she is a Mrs Kapoor. He reveals that the flat is being subleased and though Tina was unaware of this, she will have to be evicted. He tells Tina she can appeal to the county court but Tina decides to move out straight away. |
| Heidi | 10 April | Uncredited | One of two German tourists who rent a room for the night in Jay Brown (Jamie Borthwick) and Ben Mitchell's (Harry Reid) flat. When Jay goes missing, Ben finds him locked in the bathroom and he reveals that Heidi seduced him and tied him up. Their television is missing and the two girls have left without paying their rent. |
| Niall | 14 April | Jack Daniels | A man in a nightclub who tells the bouncer (Marko Leht) that Abi Branning (Lorna Fitzgerald) is with him so the bouncer will let her in. They talk and later kiss, but then she is sick on him and he tells her sister Lauren Branning (Jacqueline Jossa) and Whitney Carter (Shona McGarty) to take her home. |
| Corrine Mandel | 21 April – 4 July (5 episodes) | Laura Rogers | A woman who works at Weyland & Co, and interviews Lauren Branning (Jacqueline Jossa), alongside her colleague Josh Hemmings (Eddie Eyre). She then apologises to Lauren for having to re-arrange her induction. Corrine later tells Lauren she is doing well at her job but sends her home when she is unwell. She then celebrates with Josh when there is good news about one of the company's projects. |
| Rowan | 25 April | Ace Ruele | Two strippers hired by Woody Woodward (Lee Ryan) to perform at ladies' night at The Queen Victoria public house. Johnny Carter (Ted Reilly) enjoys watching Luke strip and flirts with Luke, and later leaves with him. Rowan pays Woody money as they bet on Johnny leaving with Luke, but Johnny returns and hears this, so is angry and Woody is forced to return the money. |
| Luke | 25 April | Uncredited | Two strippers hired by Woody Woodward (Lee Ryan) to perform at ladies' night at The Queen Victoria public house. Johnny Carter (Ted Reilly) enjoys watching Luke strip and flirts with Luke, and later leaves with him. Rowan pays Woody money as they bet on Johnny leaving with Luke, but Johnny returns and hears this, so is angry and Woody is forced to return the money. |
| Mr Cockerill | 1 May | Matthew Bates | A community service supervisor who tells Michelle Fowler (Jenna Russell) that she must eat her lunch with the rest of the people doing community service. |
| Greg Dowson | 2 May | Ian Attard | A man who interviews Denise Fox (Diane Parish) for a "services sector" job that she has applied for. She soon realises it is a cleaning job when he asks her what equipment she used to clean at the shop she used to work in. Denise says it is not the kind of job she is looking for but Greg tells her that cleaning is nothing to be ashamed of and she needs a job, so she sits back down. |
| Toby | 8 May | Matt Jessup | Clients of Weyland & Co who are present for Josh Hemmings (Eddie Eyre) presentation. Lauren Branning (Jacqueline Jossa) gives her input on the types of businesses that devalues an area. |
| Nargis | 8 May | Shanice Stewart-Jones | Clients of Weyland & Co who are present for Josh Hemmings (Eddie Eyre) presentation. Lauren Branning (Jacqueline Jossa) gives her input on the types of businesses that devalues an area. |
| Dusana | 15 May | Joanna Kanska | A woman who queues with Denise Fox (Diane Parish) in the Job Centre and assures Denise that applying for benefits is providing for your family and as she paid her taxes all her life she should feel no shame. Dusana encourages Denise to be honest and assures her she will not be judged. |
| Naveed Omar | 15 May | Sid Sagar | The receptionist at the Job Centre, who tells Denise Fox (Diane Parish) that she must apply for Universal Credit online, which angers Denise as she has wasted her time in a queue. |
| Debra Hammond | 15 May | Katie Neil | A woman who is being interviewed for a sales assistant job at Porter & Bryce, along with Michelle Fowler (Jenna Russell). |
| Liz James | 15 May | Melanie Gutteridge | A woman who interviews Michelle Fowler (Jenna Russell) for a sales assistant job at Porter & Bryce. |
| Manpreeet Khatri | 15 May | Uncredited | A woman who is being interviewed for a sales assistant job at Porter & Bryce, along with Michelle Fowler (Jenna Russell). |
| DC Frame | 15–16 May (2 episodes) | Uncredited | A police officer who arrests Jack Branning (Scott Maslen) and later interviews Honey Mitchell (Emma Barton). |
| Kai | 16 May | Tom Gilling | Kai is man who Ian Beale (Adam Woodyatt) meets at Slim Start. Ian makes jokes to him about sneaking in food and Kai thinks Ian might be in the wrong place. Ian sees Maggie, who is running the group, and Kai reveals she used to weigh 22 stone and that thanks to her, is no longer suicidal. Maggie gets Ian weighed and then asks why he is there, and shares that Karen wants to slim for a wedding, Mike gained weight after giving up smoking and Kai gained weight after a painful divorce. |
| Maggie | 16 May | Joanna Croll | Kai is man who Ian Beale (Adam Woodyatt) meets at Slim Start. Ian makes jokes to him about sneaking in food and Kai thinks Ian might be in the wrong place. Ian sees Maggie, who is running the group, and Kai reveals she used to weigh 22 stone and that thanks to her, is no longer suicidal. Maggie gets Ian weighed and then asks why he is there, and shares that Karen wants to slim for a wedding, Mike gained weight after giving up smoking and Kai gained weight after a painful divorce. |
| Karen | 16 May | Uncredited | Kai is man who Ian Beale (Adam Woodyatt) meets at Slim Start. Ian makes jokes to him about sneaking in food and Kai thinks Ian might be in the wrong place. Ian sees Maggie, who is running the group, and Kai reveals she used to weigh 22 stone and that thanks to her, is no longer suicidal. Maggie gets Ian weighed and then asks why he is there, and shares that Karen wants to slim for a wedding, Mike gained weight after giving up smoking and Kai gained weight after a painful divorce. |
| Mike | 16 May | Uncredited | Kai is man who Ian Beale (Adam Woodyatt) meets at Slim Start. Ian makes jokes to him about sneaking in food and Kai thinks Ian might be in the wrong place. Ian sees Maggie, who is running the group, and Kai reveals she used to weigh 22 stone and that thanks to her, is no longer suicidal. Maggie gets Ian weighed and then asks why he is there, and shares that Karen wants to slim for a wedding, Mike gained weight after giving up smoking and Kai gained weight after a painful divorce. |
| Kieran | 16 May | Roly Botha | An employee of Walford Job Centre who tells Denise Fox (Diane Parish) as she left her last job in the Minute Mart voluntary, she will not receive any benefit money for ten weeks. He recommends a food bank and gives her a referral slip. |
| Chris | 18 May | Uncredited | A security guard who prevents Whitney Carter (Shona McGarty) from running off with stolen goods. The other security guard (Tomi May) tells Chris that he'll deal with Whitney. |
| Candice | 18–19 May (2 episodes) | Maia Watkins | A young mother who Denise Fox (Diane Parish) meets at Walford Food Bank. Denise later gives her food to Candice's son, Harley, as Candice has not got a food voucher and is crying that she and her two children are hungry. |
| Harley | 18–19 May (2 episodes) | Uncredited | A young mother who Denise Fox (Diane Parish) meets at Walford Food Bank. Denise later gives her food to Candice's son, Harley, as Candice has not got a food voucher and is crying that she and her two children are hungry. |
| Sam | 18–19 May (2 episodes) | Rob Maloney | A volunteer at Walford Food Bank. He introduces Denise Fox (Diane Parish) to his colleague Cora Cross (Ann Mitchell). He is later seen talking to Candice (Maia Watkins) when she does not have a food voucher (credited as "volunteer"). |
| Sarah | 19 May | Jade Matthew | A woman who goes on a date with Kush Kazemi (Davood Ghadami), which is arranged by Kush's friend Martin Fowler (James Bye) through a dating app. Kim Fox-Hubbard (Tameka Empson), sister of Kush's former girlfriend, Denise Fox (Diane Parish), serves Sarah in the Albert bar and asks her for ID despite her being 26 years old, and insults her photo. Kush and Sarah's date is awkward, and he says he is in the wrong "headspace", so she tells him to delete his dating profile and leaves. |
| Kelly | 23 May | Zoë Harrison | The manager at Porter & Bryce, where Michelle Fowler (Jenna Russell) gets a job as a sales assistant. When Michelle attempts to work the checkout, Kelly reminds her that she has not been trained and could mess up their takings, so she gets Michelle to sort clothes out. Another employee, Steph (Hannah Jane Fox), tells Michelle that Kelly's sister wanted her job. |
| Steph | 23 May | Hannah-Jane Fox | An employee at Porter & Bryce, where Michelle Fowler (Jenna Russell) gets a job as a sales assistant. Steph tells Michelle about their colleagues and that Kelly's (Zoë Harrison) sister wanted her job. Steph invites Michelle for a drink. |
| Geoff | 25 May | Steven George | A man at a diabetes presentation, who tells Jane Beale (Laurie Brett) and Ian Beale (Adam Woodyatt) that he has type 2 diabetes, which resulted in the loss of his sight and that he will be getting married in August but will not be able to see his bride. This prompts Ian to take his own type 2 diabetes more seriously. |
| Joan Murfield | 1 June – 3 July (3 episodes) | Eileen Davies | A friend of Ted Murray (Christopher Timothy) and Joyce Murray (Maggie Steed). They are former neighbours in Walford Towers, which is due to be demolished. The three of them meet in the café and Ted and Joyce ask Joan if the "neighbours from hell" have moved out yet, and Joan says they nearly killed her. Joan says she is planning to move near to her son, Stuart, but says she will not be happy to move. After Joan leaves, Ted calls her "Moanie Joanie" and complains about her not paying for her food. Joan visits the Murrays again, but realises that her former neighbour, Karen Taylor (Lorraine Stanley) has moved into the same building as Ted and Joyce. Joan says she will not visit them again. Joan later has a drink in The Queen Victoria public house with Joyce. |
| Liz Cotton | 2–8 June (3 episodes) | Michelle Connolly | Liz is married to Charlie Cotton (Declan Bennett). Charlie and Jack Branning (Scott Maslen) are embroiled in a custody battle for Matthew Mitchell Cotton, Charlie's son with Jack's dead wife, Ronnie Branning (Samantha Womack), caused by Jack's brother, Max Branning (Jake Wood). Liz arrives in Albert Square in place of Charlie and tells Jack about her job and family, trying to assure him that Matthew would have a good life in Ireland and that Matthew's cousins, Amy Mitchell (Abbie Knowles) and Ricky Mitchell (Henri Charles) would be welcome to visit. Jack phones Liz to arrange a visit and agree rules for Matthew, letting Charlie have residency. Liz is unimpressed when she finds out Charlie has invited his grandmother Dot Branning (June Brown) to live with them in Ireland, insisting that Dot is not coming as it is their time and chance for a fresh start. It is revealed that Liz has been having IVF treatment that has not worked and having Matthew is her only chance of having a family with Charlie. Liz breaks the news to Dot that they do not want her to live with them. Jack and Dot are heartbroken when Matthew leaves with Charlie and Liz. |
| Suzie | 5 June – 3 August (5 episodes) | Uncredited | An employee of Weyland & Co where Lauren Branning (Jacqueline Jossa) works. |
| Mrs Kapoor | 12 June | Maya Saroya | A teacher at Walford Primary School. When Jack Branning (Scott Maslen) takes his children, Amy Mitchell (Abbie Knowles) and Ricky Mitchell (Henri Charles), to school, Mrs Kapoor tells him that she needs to talk to him about Amy's disruptive behaviour, but Jack asks to talk the next day as he is in a hurry. |
| Nurse Rachel Covell | 15 June | Emily Wyatt | A nurse at a sexual health clinic, who Louise Mitchell (Tilly Keeper) sees to get tested for sexually transmitted diseases after being told that she had sex with Keegan Baker (Zack Morris) whilst drunk and that he has chlamydia. Rachel assures Louise that despite being fifteen, it is confidential. When Louise says she hates the person she had sex with, Rachel asks Louise if she wanted to have sex. |
| PC Jaz Jones | 16 June – 3 August (5 episodes) | Charlie De Melo | When Louise Mitchell (Tilly Keeper) thinks she has been raped by Keegan Baker (Zack Morris), she and her stepmother, Sharon Mitchell (Letitia Dean), report it to the police. Jaz arrives at the home of Keegan's family with DC Sally Booth (Sanchia McCormack) and is familiar with the family. Despite Keegan saying he made it up, Jaz arrests Keegan on suspicion of rape. Jaz comes to see how Louise is doing the following day. Jaz later arrives at Kush Kazemi's (Davood Ghadami) flat to speak to him about an incident involving the Taylors' dog, Bronson, who ended up in a pond after a scuffle in the park. Kush does not give a statement. Jaz visits Karen and Keegan, who also refuse to make a complaint, but Keegan mentions that Kush was looking after Arthur Fowler, whose mother, Stacey Fowler (Lacey Turner) has mental health problems. Jaz then visits Stacey and her husband Martin Fowler (James Bye) to check if Arthur was injured, and Martin worries that Social Services may get involved. The Taylors' social worker realises that they stole Arthur Fowler's (Bill Treacher) bench and Jaz visits the family to arrest Karen, but Keanu stops him. |
| Kevin | 22 June | Nick Cavaliere | A signwriter hired by Billy Mitchell (Perry Fenwick) to create the new Coker & Mitchell Funeral Directors sign but when the sign is unveiled it is smudged. |
| Dr Hargreaves | 29 June | Alex Jordan | A doctor who Robbie Jackson (Dean Gaffney) complains to about not being able to find his step-grandmother Dot Branning (June Brown). Hargreaves tells Robbie that the ward she needs is full and she will have to wait for a bed. |
| Shanice | 29 June | Rosie Akerman | A woman who tells Robbie Jackson (Dean Gaffney), Sonia Fowler (Natalie Cassidy) and Patrick Trueman (Rudolph Walker) where to find Dot Branning (June Brown) after she is hospitalised. Shanice appears with her arm in a sling following a hen party. |
| Nurse Zennia | 29 June | Malgorzata Klara | A nurse who Sonia Fowler (Natalie Cassidy) complains to about her step-grandmother Dot Branning (June Brown) being left in a hospital corridor instead of on a ward. Zennia says they have no beds available, but Sonia says that Dot has been left around drunken people. Zennia finds a more quiet place for Dot, but when another drunk person appears, Sonia says Dot cannot stay there, so goes to find Zennia, but another man is complaining to her that his wife has been waiting for three hours. Zennia later tells Sonia that a bed has been found for Dot. |
| Dr Ali | 29–30 June (2 episodes) | Tariq Jordan | A doctor who tells Dot Branning (June Brown) that she needs a hip operation following her fall. Dot asks if he is old enough to be a doctor, so he offers to show her his driver's licence as proof. |
| Elsie | 29–30 June (2 episodes) | Penny Ryder | A patient who Dot Branning (June Brown) meets when she is placed in a hospital ward. Elsie tells Dot that she has been on the ward for a month after assuming she would be out quickly, and tells Dot she has no family at home. |
| Lance | 4 July 2017– 23 July 2018 (14 episodes) | Uncredited | Two mechanics hired by Ben Mitchell (Harry Reid) at Mitchell's Autos. When Ben wants to confront Luke Browning (Adam Astill), he asks Lance to lock up The Arches. When Luke, who is now Ben's boyfriend, watches Lance working on a car, Ben tells Lance to go on his lunch break to stop Luke looking at him. When Ben arrives at The Arches, he gives Cole and Lance their sandwiches, Lance points into the arches to tell Ben that Luke is inside waiting for him. On Keanu Taylor's (Danny Walters) first day working at The Arches, Cole is fixing a car. When Hunter Owen (Charlie Winter) is waiting by The Arches for Phil Mitchell (Steve McFadden) as he wants to learn how to repair a car, Lance is seen in the background. Vincent Hubbard (Richard Blackwood) visits Phil to aks him about Luke, Lance is seen in the background. When Phil's wife, Sharon Mitchell (Letitia Dean), visit The Arches looking for Keanu, Lance is seen in the background. When Kat Moon (Jessie Wallace) comes to see Keanu, Lance looks after The Arches. When Sharon comes to see Phil, Lance is fixing a car. |
| Cole | 4 July 2017– 12 March 2018 (6 episodes) | Uncredited | |
| Dave | 6 July | Uncredited | The stall holder of Walford Wholefoods, who Donna Yates (Lisa Hammond) purposely shouts hello to, when Robbie Jackson (Dean Gaffney) is looking for Dot Branning's (June Brown) lost cat, who is also named Dave. |
| Dr Armstrong | 7 July | Pezh Maan | A doctor who speaks to Dot Branning (June Brown) about her refusing physiotherapy. Dot says she does not need it. |
| Callum | 10 July – 14 September (2 episodes) | Shaun Aylward | A fellow student from King Edward Secondary School that Bernadette Taylor (Clair Norris) meets up with in the allotments after she discovers she is pregnant and refuses to tell her mother, Karen Taylor (Lorraine Stanley) who the father is. She tells Callum that she is pregnant by him. He becomes emotional because he is worried about his abusive father's reaction, but Bernadette says that she will not let him hurt Callum. He offers her the £16 he has in his bank account and asks if they should get married. After Bernadette suffers a miscarriage, she arranges to meet Callum at the allotments, but Bernadette's mother, Karen, and half-brothers, Keanu Taylor (Danny Walters) and Keegan Baker (Zack Morris), go there to do a memorial for the baby. Keegan punches Callum when he realises he is the father, but Callum joins the family for the memorial and Bernadette reveals their daughter was going to be called Belle. Karen then invites Callum to join them for tea. When the school term starts, Callum texts Bernadette to end their relationship, leaving her heartbroken. |
| Persephone | 14 July | Tara Godolphin | A talent scout who asks Louise Mitchell (Tilly Keeper) to become a model. |
| Libby Walker | 20 July | Uncredited | A student at Walford High School who attends the prom and Madison Drake (Seraphina Beh) refers to her as a mess. |
| DC Walters | 21 July | Matt McClure | A police officer who arrests Madison Drake and Alexandra D'Costa (Seraphina Beh and Sydney Craven) for the grievous bodily harm of Louise Mitchell (Tilly Keeper) after she is pushed into lit candles by Alexandra. |
| Mrs Kempton | 21–27 July (3 episodes) | Joanna Croll | A surgeon who gives Louise Mitchell (Tilly Keeper) an operation after suffering from burns from candles. She tells Louise's stepmother Sharon Mitchell (Letitia Dean), Louise's friend Bex Fowler (Jasmine Armfield) and Bex's mother Sonia Fowler (Natalie Cassidy) that Louise has third degree burns and will need another operation and skin grafts. She then takes Louise for the skin graft operation. |
| Nurse Amanda Jacob | 24 July | Shamia Chalabi | A nurse who orders Sharon Mitchell (Letitia Dean) and Lisa Fowler (Lucy Benjamin) to stop arguing around Louise Mitchell (Tilly Keeper), who is in hospital with burns. She mistakes Sharon for Louise's mother and gives Louise pain relief. |
| Nurse Jude Pepple | 25 July | Chin Nyenwe | A nurse who tells Louise Mitchell's (Tilly Keeper) family that only three people can visit Louise at a time. He then takes Louise for a skin graft operation. |
| Dr Alice Waldren | 27 July | Rosy Benjamin | A therapist who Lisa Fowler (Lucy Benjamin) talks to about her daughter Louise Mitchell (Tilly Keeper) (credited as "social worker"). |
| Nurse Sally | 31 July – 1 August (2 episodes) | Peri Olufunwa | A nurse who allows Louise Mitchell (Tilly Keeper), who is in hospital with burns, to get into her own clothes. When Louise's mother Lisa Fowler (Lucy Benjamin) asks her if she can take Louise outside, Sally tells her to be careful. When Louise goes missing, Sally tells Louise's father Phil Mitchell (Steve McFadden) and stepmother Sharon Mitchell (Letitia Dean) that she did not think that Lisa would take Louise out of the hospital. |
| DS Jennifer Adney | 1 August 2017– 25 May 2018 (4 episodes) | Joanna Miller | A police officer who helps Phil Mitchell (Steve McFadden) and his wife Sharon Mitchell (Letitia Dean) find Phil's daughter Louise Mitchell (Tilly Keeper) after she is abducted by her mother Lisa Fowler (Lucy Benjamin). She tells them that they are heading for Liverpool Street Station. The following day, she reveals that Lisa and Louise were not at the station, but were traced to Castle Point thanks to Lisa's credit card. In May 2018, she leads the search for Shakil Kazemi (Shaheen Jafargholi), who is missing, and calls for an ambulance when he is found, having been stabbed in the back. Adney asks his friend, Keegan Baker (Zack Morris), who has also been stabbed, what happened and he tells her it was a random attack, however, after Shakil dies, Keegan tells her that a gang were looking for him because he stole a bicycle. |
| Dominic | 3 August | Barry McStay | A receptionist at the Mayside Hotel who is asked by Phil Mitchell (Steve McFadden) if Lisa Fowler (Lucy Benjamin) is living there. Phil then forces Dominic to give him the keys to Lisa's room. When Phil unlocks the room, Lisa hits him over the head with a telephone. Dominic then calls an ambulance (credited as "hotel receptionist"). |
| Mark | 22 August | Richard Frame | A man who petitions against a halfway house that is proposed to replace the community centre. When Mark goes to The Queen Victoria public house, he asks Shirley Carter (Linda Henry) to sign the petition, but she is against his views about the halfway house as she has served time in prison. Shirley's friend Phil Mitchell (Steve McFadden) defends her and he orders Mark out of The Vic. |
| Lanky | 24 August | Uncredited | A woman who works for Coker & Mitchell Funeral Directors. Jay Brown (Jamie Borthwick) tells her to go on a break and he attempts to steal money from the manager's office only to discover there is none. |
| PC Leanne Wane | 25 August – 2 November (2 episodes) | Kirsty Osmon | A police officer who investigates Ted Murray (Christopher Timothy) and Joyce Murray's (Maggie Steed) house after it was burgled (credited as "police officer"). Two months later, she takes a statement from Tina Carter (Luisa Bradshaw-White) after she was a victim of an attempted robbery. |
| Stuart | 4–5 September (2 episodes) | James Fisher | A man leading a group of demonstrators who are protesting against the council at the Walford in Bloom event. Following a gas explosion in the Square, Stuart helps the injured, including Michelle Fowler (Jenna Russell). |
| DI Ellie Kent | 11 September 2017– 5 November 2018 (5 episodes) | Polly Maberly | A police officer who is investigating Steven Beale's (Aaron Sidwell) death and the fire at Beale's restaurant. She questions Abi Branning (Lorna Fitzgerald) and Lauren Branning (Jacqueline Jossa). She then tells Ian Beale (Adam Woodyatt) that someone committed arson in the restaurant. In May 2018, following a stabbing in which Shakil Kazemi (Shaheen Jafargholi) is killed, Kent visits club manager Mel Owen (Tamzin Outhwaite) with a photo of the suspect to see if Mel has seen him. The next day, Shakil's mother, Carmel Kazemi (Bonnie Langford) visits Kent at the police station to ask if Shakil's watch is with his belongings. Kent confirms it is not and says it could have been stolen during the stabbing. When Keegan Baker (Zack Morris) believes he has killed someone, he reports the murder and is interviewed by Kent but after she checks, she says she has wasted his time as there was no murder. |
| Mr Spode | 12 September | James Duke | A solicitor who represents Martin Fowler (James Bye) in court after he assaulted a police officer. He tells the chair of the bench (Christopher Ravenscroft) that Martin has a wife and children and that he needs to go home to them, but Martin is sentenced to four weeks' imprisonment. |
| Dr Webster | 14–19 September (4 episodes) | Andrew Lewis | A doctor who treats Kush Kazemi (Davood Ghadami) after he collapses with a cardiac arrest. He tells Kush's girlfriend, Denise Fox (Diane Parish), that Kush has been diagnosed with Brugada syndrome and recommends that Kush has an operation to have an implantable cardioverter-defibrillator fitted. He later suggests to Kush's mother, Carmel Kazemi (Bonnie Langford), that she needs to be tested for the condition. After this, he confirms to Carmel that she has the condition and that she has passed it on to Kush, and that her son Shakil Kazemi (Shaheen Jafargholi), despite showing no signs of the disease, could still have it. When Stacey Fowler (Lacey Turner) finds out that her and Kush's son Arthur Fowler could also have Brugada syndrome, she goes for a check-up appointment with Dr Webster. |
| Jan | 19 September | Esther Coles | A marriage counsellor who Mick Carter (Danny Dyer) and Linda Carter (Kellie Bright) talk to about their marriage failing. When Linda talks about her rape to Jan, Mick walks out of the room. |
| Dr Lucas Sharpe | 21 September | John MacKay | A doctor who tells Linda Carter (Kellie Bright) that her cancer treatment had worked well and that she has been given the all-clear. He then tells her that she would need further check-ups to rule out re-occurrence. |
| Gwen | 22 September | Alicia Charles | A family liaison officer who tells Steven Beale's (Aaron Sidwell) family that Steven died of liver bleeding and that he did not have a brain tumour. She also tells them that Steven had been taking animal pills. |
| Lloyd | 26 September – 21 November (3 episodes) | Tom Dawze | A loan shark who provides Karen Taylor (Lorraine Stanley) with a loan, saying he will be back in a month for her first repayment. He later reappears after collecting Karen's children from school as a ploy to collect the first repayment, but Karen does not have the money to do so. Karen calls Lloyd the following day and gives him the payment. However, he tells her she is still overdue after the first payment as it includes interest. When Karen does not have extra money, he orders bailiffs to remove her television. |
| Manprett Hesbani | 26 September | Tania Rodrigues | A doctor who tells Stacey Fowler (Lacey Turner), Martin Fowler (James Bye) and Kush Kazemi (Davood Ghadami) that Arthur Fowler (Hunter Bell) is at a high risk of having inherited Brugada syndrome but that she cannot be sure until a later stage in his development and recommends equipment they can purchase to make Arthur safer. |
| Doug | 29 September | Trevor Murphy | A man who Michelle Fowler (Jenna Russell) meets on a dating website. She goes on a date with him at The Albert bar. When the date ends, he asks her if she wants to meet him again and she agrees. Later, Tom Bailey (Daniel Casey), who Michelle has recently rejected, pins Doug against a wall and tells him that he is Michelle's husband and he threatens Doug to not see Michelle again. |
| Dr Roberts | 2 October | Fleur Keith | A doctor who treats Arthur Fowler (Hunter Bell) after he suffers a collapse. She tells Arthur's mother Stacey Fowler (Lacey Turner) and stepfather Martin Fowler (James Bye) that Arthur collapsed because he swallowed Stacey's bipolar pills. |
| Mr Waters | 2 October | Andrew Bone | A man who accuses Sonia Fowler (Natalie Cassidy) of stealing money from his dead mother's inheritance. She tries to explain to him that she had left the money to her in her will. Gethin Pryce (Cerith Flinn) tells him to back off. |
| Dana | 3–5 October (2 episodes) | Tracy Whitwell | A life drawing teacher who offers Keanu Taylor (Danny Walters) the chance to be a model. She then pays Keanu after he models naked in front of the class. |
| Dr Raynor | 10 October | Julien Ball | A doctor who examines Arthur Fowler's (Hunter Bell) bruises on his arms. He tells Arthur's mother Stacey Fowler (Lacey Turner) that Arthur must have got his bruises from bumping into things. He allows her to take Arthur and her daughter Lily Fowler (Aine Garvey) home. |
| PC Amelia Gayle | 12 October 2017– 4 September 2018 (2 episodes) | Jennifer Saayeng | A police officer who Michelle Fowler (Jenna Russell) gives a statement to about Tom Bailey (Daniel Casey) who keeps ringing the house phone and not speaking. PC Gayle tells Michelle that she should keep a record of the time when Tom tries to stalk her. |
| Finch | 12 October | Deano Bugatti | A fellow life model who recommends an escorting agency to Keanu Taylor (Danny Walters). |
| Dr Prince | 16 October | Bryony Afferson | A doctor who treats Stacey Fowler (Lacey Turner) following a seizure, and tells Stacey's husband Martin Fowler (James Bye) that she suffered a placental abruption and is in intensive care. Later, she tells Martin that Stacey is doing well and takes Martin to see his newborn daughter. |
| DCI Alsworth | 16 October 2017– 12 June 2018 (8 episodes) | Nik Drake | Two police officers who interview Jane Beale (Laurie Brett) about the fire at Beales' restaurant. She asks for her mobile phone back from them but they say it was not in her belongings. Later, she explains to the two officers what happened in the fire, but after being threatened by Max Branning (Jake Wood), she does not tell them that he was involved. In January 2018, Alsworth investigates an alleged robbery but Ciara Maguire (Denise McCormack) tells him that she staged the robbery as part of security training. However, Alsworth visits Ben Mitchell (Harry Reid) at the garage where the incident took place and asks if he knows Aidan Maguire (Patrick Bergin), who is Ciara's former husband, but Ben denies having seen him. |
| DS Barry | 16 October | Uncredited | |
| Rochelle | 16 October | Anita Louise Combe | An agent at Prince Charming Escorts who interviews Keanu Taylor (Danny Walters). She tells him that he is a "bit of rough" and therefore different to their usual escorts, but that women will like that. After he says he does not think the job will suit him, she tells him he could earn £300 a day and tells him to think about it. |
| Pippa | 17 October | Uncredited | A woman who works in Bridge Street café and serves Keanu Taylor (Danny Walters). |
| Julie | 19 October | Mazz Murray | A woman who books Keanu Taylor (Danny Walters) through the Prince Charming Escort agency. She invites Keanu to her hotel room. Later, he finds her crying in the bathroom and she admits this is her first time hiring an escort. she tells Keanu her former husband was a controlling narcissist and she has recently divorced him. She pays Keanu a substantial tip before he leaves. |
| Sarah | 19 October | Uncredited | Nurses who Ian Beale (Adam Woodyatt) thanks for helping with Jane Beale's (Laurie Brett) recovery. |
| Becky | 19 October | Uncredited | Nurses who Ian Beale (Adam Woodyatt) thanks for helping with Jane Beale's (Laurie Brett) recovery. |
| Mr Mayer | 26 October | Nick Harris | Two HMRC officers who carry out a tax audit on Coker and Mitchell, the funeral home. Mr Mayer tells Billy Mitchell (Perry Fenwick) that he will have to pay a substantial fine. |
| Mr Bridge | 26 October | Uncredited | Two HMRC officers who carry out a tax audit on Coker and Mitchell, the funeral home. Mr Mayer tells Billy Mitchell (Perry Fenwick) that he will have to pay a substantial fine. |
| Lorraine | 27 October | Sarah Durham | The manager at the veterinary surgery where Abi Branning (Lorna Fitzgerald) works. She visits Abi at home to fire her as she has been caught on CCTV stealing animal medication. |
| Dr Sullivan | 3 November | Mark Rawlings | A doctor who treats Janet Mitchell (Grace) after she sustains injuries from being hit by a car. |
| David Kennedy | 9 November | Jason Baughan | A man who works for Walford Council. He tells council employee Carmel Kazemi (Bonnie Langford) that confidential information has been accessed by a third party and that she is suspended until they carry out an investigation. |
| Sol | 10 November – 12 December (2 episodes) | Kevin McCurdy | A man who escorts Phil Mitchell (Steve McFadden) in and later out of James Willmott-Brown's (William Boyde) home. |
| Imogen | 20–21 November (2 episodes) | Alexandra Sinclair | The former fiancée of Josh Hemmings (Eddie Eyre) who arrives at Weyland & Co office where he works. Imogen is confused to see Josh working with his assistant Lauren Branning (Jacqueline Jossa) and belittles Lauren due to her position at the firm, lack of education and that she has an infant son born out of wedlock. Imogen also refers Lauren as "Laura", which Lauren tries in frustration to correct her. Lauren later sees Josh talking to Imogen. |
| Megan | 24 November | Uncredited | An employee of Weyland & Co where Lauren Branning (Jacqueline Jossa) works. |
| Jeff Atkinson | 11 December | Dominic Thorburn | A human resources manager at Bartons Brewers, where Mick Carter (Danny Dyer) and his wife Linda Carter (Kellie Bright) attend an interview to take on a new pub. When they arrive, Jeff arrogantly drives into their parking space before Mick can reverse in, and they are surprised to see that he is conducting the interview. Jeff offers them the pub but they are shocked to discover that it is in Stratford-upon-Avon instead of Stratford, London. |
| Kenny Thomas | 14 December | Simon Cole | A photographer from the Walford Gazette who arrives at the local community centre for a press launch of the planned redevelopment of the area. Lauren Branning (Jacqueline Jossa) tells him he is in the wrong place and sends him somewhere else, and he apologises when he finally arrives late. |
| DI Fuller | 26 December | Philip Brodie | A police officer who arrests Max Branning (Jake Wood) on suspicion of GBH after he admits that it was his fault that his daughters Lauren Branning (Jacqueline Jossa) and Abi Branning (Lorna Fitzgerald) fell off a roof. Fuller interviews Max but he answers "no comment" and Fuller accuses him of luring his daughters to the roof, however, off the record, in exchange for information about his daughters, Max admits to Fuller that he was suicidal. However, a video emerges of the incident showing that they slipped, so Fuller tells Max they will no longer be pursuing the matter and Max is free to leave. |
| Dr Henry | 26 December | Clare Lawrence Moody | A doctor who admits Abi Branning (Lorna Fitzgerald) to hospital following her fall from The Queen Victoria public house roof, along with her sister, Lauren Branning (Jacqueline Jossa). She later speaks to their parents, Max Branning (Jake Wood) and Tanya Cross (Jo Joyner), saying she has news about one of their daughters. |
| Dave | 28 December (2 episodes) | Stephen Fawkes | A bailiff that removes goods from the Taylor family flat as Karen Taylor (Lorraine Stanley) defaulted on the loans that she has taken out. He tells Karen that she needs to raise £1000 or she will get served with a third party debt order. |
| Dr Harding | 28 December 2017– 19 January 2018 (8 episodes) | Nick Waring | A doctor who informs Max Branning (Jake Wood) that Abi Branning (Lorna Fitzgerald) will never recover from her fall off The Queen Victoria roof and she is declared brain dead. He later delivers her baby girl via caesarean section on New Year's Eve. Max obtains a court order preventing Dr Harding withdrawing life support and presents information on a medical trial in the US to Dr Harding that costs £2,000,000, but Dr Harding urges Max to do the dignified thing for Abi as she is already dead. Dr Harding reminds Max that Abi is not a minor and he has no legal rights. Max threatens to go to the press and find details about Dr Harding's private life and accuses him of killing Abi, but Abi's older sister, Lauren Branning (Jacqueline Jossa) shouts at Max, telling him he killed Abi. Max barricades Abi's room and refuses to comply and listen to Dr Harding, Lauren or his brother, Jack Branning (Scott Maslen), but Max relents when Dr Harding's colleague, Nurse Lennon (Dystin Johnson), tells him about her son's death. When Max goes to visit Abi's baby, Dr Harding tells Max and Lauren that her life support will be withdrawn that day and he later explains to them what will happen. Max asks if Abi's machines can be withdrawn at her time of birth, 8:32pm. Abi's life support is withdrawn with her family's presence. |
