= List of EastEnders characters introduced in 2019 =

EastEnders logo

EastEnders is a BBC soap opera that first aired on 19 February 1985. The following is a list of characters that first appeared in 2019, in order of first appearance. The characters are initially introduced by the show's executive consultant, John Yorke, or his successors, senior executive producer, Kate Oates, or executive producer, Jon Sen. The first character to be introduced is Bailey Baker (Kara-Leah Fernandes), the daughter of Mitch Baker (Roger Griffiths). She is followed by her mother Dinah Wilson (Anjela Lauren Smith) who is introduced the following month. Sisters Iqra Ahmed (Priya Davdra) and Habiba Ahmed (Rukku Nahar), the granddaughters of Arshad Ahmed (Madhav Sharma) and Mariam Ahmed (Indira Joshi) are also introduced in February. Danny Hardcastle (Paul Usher) and Midge (Tom Colley), associates of Phil Mitchell (Steve McFadden), are introduced next, followed by Chantelle Atkins (Jessica Plummer), the daughter of Karen Taylor (Lorraine Stanley) and Mitch Baker (Roger Griffiths). Chantelle is joined by her husband Gray Atkins (Toby-Alexander Smith) and her children Mia Atkins (Mahalia Malcolm) and Mackenzie Atkins (Isaac Lemonius). Later, Brooke (Ria Lopez) is introduced as a love interest for Bernadette Taylor (Clair Norris). In June, Daniel Cook (Adrian Edmondson) joined, later followed by Jonno Highway (Richard Graham), the father of Stuart (Ricky Champ) and Callum Highway (Tony Clay). In August, the wife of Patrick Trueman (Rudolph Walker), Sheree Trueman (Suzette Llewellyn) was introduced as well as Ash Panesar (Gurlaine Kaur Garcha), the girlfriend of Iqra. In September, Tom Wells joined the cast as Leo King, the son of Tony King (Chris Coghill) and Wanda Baptiste (Anni Domingo) as Sheree's mother. October saw the introductions of the Panesar brothers: Jags (Amar Adatia), Kheerat (Jaz Deol) and Vinny (Shiv Jalota). Additionally, multiple other characters appear throughout the year.

== Bailey Baker ==
Bailey Baker
- EastEnders character
- Portrayed by: Kara-Leah Fernandes
- Duration: 2019–2023
- First appearance: Episode 5847; 10 January 2019
- Last appearance: Episode 6816; 8 December 2023
- Introduced by: John Yorke
- Crossover appearances: Doctors (2021); Emmerdale (2021)
In-universe information
- Father: Mitch Baker
- Mother: Dinah Wilson
- Half-brothers: Keegan Baker
- Half-sisters: Chantelle Atkins
- Nephews: Mackenzie Atkins
- Nieces: Mia Atkins
- First cousins: Felix Baker

Bailey Baker, played by Kara-Leah Fernandes, first appears in episode 5847, which was first broadcast on 10 January 2019.

Bailey is a girl who is in Mitch Baker's (Roger Griffiths) van when drug addict Craig (Andrew Armitage) tries to break in. She hits him over the head and then Mitch arrives, telling Bailey to keep quiet but she says she is bored so he says he will get her a football to play with. Mick Carter (Danny Dyer) sees Bailey sitting with the ball on the street and when she says it is boring on her own, he says he used to spend hours kicking a ball against a wall. Bailey decides to kick the ball against the wall of Mick's pub, The Queen Victoria, but she smashes an upstairs window. Mick, his wife, Linda Carter (Kellie Bright), Mitch, his son Keegan Baker (Zack Morris) and Keegan's mother, Karen Taylor (Lorraine Stanley) all arrive but when Karen tells Bailey to leave, Mitch is forced to say she is with him. Mitch tells Karen that Bailey is his friend's daughter, and takes Bailey to a football training session. However, after Karen looks after Bailey, Bailey asks Mitch why she is not allowed to tell people that he is her father.

When Bailey returns home from a football game, she is shown to be a young carer for her mother, Dinah Wilson (Anjela Lauren Smith), who is suffering from multiple sclerosis. When the Taylor family find out, they pledge to help out, and encourage Bailey to seek help from a care organisation. When Dinah commits suicide, Bailey moves in with Karen and her children. Bailey overhears a conversation between Karen and Mitch, where she discovers that Karen knew Dinah was going to kill herself. She holds a grudge against Karen for a number of weeks, until Karen buys her a star in honour of her mother. When the COVID-19 lockdown occurs, she goes to live with an aunt. When Chantelle dies, Mitch goes to tell her.

Bailey was called a "mystery newcomer" by Sophie Dainty from Digital Spy.

The character made an unannounced departure from the show on 8 December 2023.

== Dinah Wilson ==
Dinah Wilson
- EastEnders character
- Portrayed by: Anjela Lauren Smith
- First appearance: Episode 5869; 14 February 2019
- Last appearance: Episode 5920; 16 May 2019
- Introduced by: John Yorke
In-universe information
- Daughters: Bailey Baker

Dinah Wilson, played by Anjela Lauren Smith, makes her first appearance in episode 5869, broadcast on 14 February 2019. Dinah is the ex-girlfriend of Mitch Baker (Roger Griffiths) and mother to his daughter Bailey Baker (Kara-Leah Fernandes). It is soon discovered that Dinah has multiple sclerosis and is looked after by Bailey.

Mitch reveals to his ex-girlfriend Karen Taylor (Lorraine Stanley) that Dinah has multiple sclerosis and that Bailey is her carer. Karen, Mitch and their two children Keegan Baker (Zack Morris) and Chantelle Atkins (Jessica Plummer) help Bailey to clean her flat and Dinah becomes friends with Karen. Unbeknownst to Bailey, Dinah's condition is getting worse and she tells Keegan. Dinah's health decline becomes apparent when she has an accident and is rushed to hospital. The Taylors later rent a room for Dinah and Bailey at 23A Albert Square so that Dinah can have more assistance. Dinah and Karen become closer and Dinah confides in Karen that she can no longer deal with her multiple sclerosis and wants Karen to help her end her life. Karen refuses and reaches out to Darren (Kris Saunders), a man with multiple sclerosis so that he can speak to Dinah. Darren tells Karen that he used to be depressed but now he enjoys his life and agrees to speak to Dinah the following week. However, Dinah refuses and tells Karen that she doesn't want her condition to ruin her life and that she wants to be there for Bailey.

Unknown to Karen, Dinah plans on ending her own life and buys birthday cards where she writes her final messages to Bailey. Karen discovers this, but Dinah breaks down and reveals that she is scared she will not be able to survive any longer and Karen encourages her to not let her condition negatively impact her life any more. Dinah spends time with Bailey and the following day, Dinah seems better and thanks Karen for her help. Karen decides to take Bailey on a family trip to Walford Park, but Dinah decides to stay at home and says her last goodbye to Bailey. After she finishes writing her last birthday cards to Bailey, Dinah commits suicide and her body is discovered by Mitch.

== Habiba Ahmed ==
Habiba Ahmed, played by Rukku Nahar, makes her first appearance in episode 5871, originally broadcast on 19 February 2019. She is introduced alongside her sister, Iqra Ahmed (Priya Davdra), as the granddaughters of Arshad Ahmed (Madhav Sharma) and Mariam Ahmed (Indira Joshi). Habiba is described as "full of heart" and "bubbly", and she has "the best intentions" but it was said that "trouble never seems to be too far behind". Nahar said of her casting, "I'm so excited to have joined EastEnders, it's a show I've grown up watching and stepping onto Albert Square is just unreal! Habiba is great fun to play and I'm so happy to be working alongside Priya. Can't wait for you all to see what we get up to on the Square." Davdra confirmed on social media that the characters would appear from February 2019.

== Iqra Ahmed ==
Iqra Ahmed, played by Priya Davdra, makes her first appearance in episode 5871, originally broadcast on 19 February 2019. She is introduced alongside her sister, Habiba Ahmed (Rukku Nahar), as the granddaughters of Arshad Ahmed (Madhav Sharma) and Mariam Ahmed (Indira Joshi). Ash Kaur (Gurlaine Kaur Garcha) is introduced as Iqra's girlfriend. Iqra is the first Muslim lesbian to be featured on EastEnders.

== Danny Hardcastle ==
Danny Hardcastle
- EastEnders character
- Portrayed by: Paul Usher
- Duration: 2019–2020
- First appearance: Episode 5890; 25 March 2019
- Last appearance: Episode 6138; 29 September 2020
- Introduced by: Kate Oates (2019, 2020)

Danny Hardcastle, played by Paul Usher, made his first appearance in episode 5890, originally broadcast on 25 March 2019. Danny is introduced as a business associate of Phil Mitchell (Steve McFadden), as well as being involved with Keanu Taylor (Danny Walters). It was announced on 6 March 2019 that the character would appear for a "short period over the spring". Danny was introduced on 25 March 2019, departed on 25 April 2019 and returned on 16 March 2020 and departed again on 29 September 2020.

Danny is an acquaintance of Phil Mitchell (Steve McFadden) who has a connection to garages used for money laundering in Spain, which leads Phil into liquidation. He arrives in Walford to tell Phil that he needs to come up with an alternative way to launder money, after the business of the garages collapsed. Phil's son Ben Mitchell (Max Bowden) decides to meet up with Danny and threaten him into going into business with him. As revenge, Danny sends Midge (Tom Colley) to befriend Phil's daughter Louise Mitchell (Tilly Keeper) and kidnap her. Louise gets trapped in a container and is due to be taken into sex trade in Odesa, but the Mitchell's manage to rescue her. Phil confronts Danny and Danny reveals that it was a warning to Ben who threatened him and Danny insults him, causing Ben to almost attack him with a glassed cup. Danny later gives Phil another job offer, but Phil refuses and warns Danny never to contact him again.

== Midge ==
Midge
- EastEnders character
- Portrayed by: Tom Colley
- First appearance: Episode 5891; 26 March 2019
- Last appearance: Episode 5907; 23 April 2019
- Introduced by: Kate Oates

Midge, played by Tom Colley, makes his first appearance in episode 5891, broadcast on 26 March 2019. The character and Colley's casting were announced on 19 March 2019. Midge is described as "thug", "dodgy" and "nasty". Midge bumps into Louise Mitchell (Tilly Keeper), causing her to spill coffee on herself. He offers to make it up to her but she declines. He later sees Keanu Taylor (Danny Walters) and when he sees Louise again, she sits with him and introduces Keanu to Midge, who says his name is short for Miguel as his mother is Spanish. Midge then meets with Louise's father, Phil Mitchell (Steve McFadden), who tells Midge not to mess around. It is revealed that Midge is a rival business owner of Phil's in Spain, that Phil stole business from when he set up garages in Spain and had Keanu working for him. Midge tells Phil he needs compensation and threatens Louise. Phil goes to hit Midge but Keanu stops him. Keanu then tells Phil that Midge was one of the people who tried to kill him in Spain.

Some time later, Midge sees Louise in the pub and says it is nice to see her again. He then calls someone to say he has made contact with "the target" and in 24 hours "she will be history". The next day, Midge realises that Keanu is protecting Louise but after Louise and Keanu argue, he sits with Louise and when Keanu tried to find Louise, he sees Midge and some other men forcing her into a car and driving away at speed. Keanu informs Phil of what he has seen and Phil realises that Louise is being taken to a shipping container yard. Midge has his associates tie Louise's legs up and gag her and he threatens to throw acid in her face if she does not do as she is told, telling her that the shipping container is destined for Odesa, Ukraine. However, when Louise is tied up, Midge reveals it was water, not acid. Midge then locks her in the container. When Keanu finds Louise, Midge knocks him out and locks them both in the container. When Phil arrives, he attacks Midge and demands to know where Louise is. Midge almost overpowers Phil but Phil overpowers Midge and finds out where Louise is.

== Chantelle Atkins ==
Chantelle Atkins (also Baker), played by Jessica Plummer, is the daughter of Karen Taylor (Lorraine Stanley) and Mitch Baker (Roger Griffiths). Chantelle first appears in Episode 5891, originally broadcast on 26 March 2019. It was announced on 20 December 2018 that the character would be joining the series in 2019. Casting for the character was still taking place at the time. On 5 March 2019, it was announced that Plummer would be playing Chantelle. Further details about the character and her family, consisting of husband Gray Atkins (Toby-Alexander Smith) and their children Mia Atkins (Mahalia Malcolm) and Mackenzie Atkins (Isaac Lemonius), were announced on 11 March 2019.

Producers used the characters of Chantelle and Gray to explore the topic of domestic violence as Gray is revealed to be attacking Chantelle. The show worked closely with Women's Aid in order to portray the issue sensitively and accurately. The story results in the character being killed-off, highlighting the impact of the COVID-19 pandemic on domestic violence; Chantelle was killed by Gray in the episode broadcast on 18 September 2020. Plummer said: "It's been such a privilege to play Chantelle and to be able to tell her story. Sadly what she goes through is all too common and her death is a reminder of the devastating effect of domestic abuse. I've known it wasn't going to end well for Chantelle for a while now and although it was a shock to find out her fate, far too many men and women suffer in silence so I hope that by raising awareness we can ultimately save lives. I am so grateful to all the team and my lovely cast members for being so supportive, I'll miss Albert Square."

Plummer was shortlisted for Best Newcomer at the 2019 Inside Soap Awards but lost out to Maureen Lipman (who plays Evelyn Plummer in Coronation Street). Plummer came second in the category for Best Soap Newcomer at the 2019 Digital Spy Reader Awards. Plummer won Best Actress at the 2020 Inside Soap Awards for her portrayal of Chantelle. At the 2020 Digital Spy Reader Awards, Plummer won Best Soap Actor (Female) and Chantelle's death was voted Most Devastating Death.

== Gray Atkins ==
Gray Atkins, played by Toby-Alexander Smith, is introduced as the husband of Chantelle Atkins (Jessica Plummer). The character and Smith's casting were announced on 11 March 2019. Gray is described as a "hard-working solicitor in London whose success took Chantelle away from Taylor Towers years earlier". Smith said of his casting, "I'm delighted to be joining the cast of EastEnders as I've always been a fan. I'm looking forward to seeing what Albert Square has in store for Gray." Gray made his first appearance on 29 March 2019. On 22 February 2022, it was announced that Gray would be leaving EastEnders, and he departed on 10 March 2022. He was the show's main antagonist from 18 September 2020 to his last appearance on 10 March 2022.

== Mia Atkins ==
Mia Atkins
- EastEnders character
- Portrayed by: Mahalia Malcolm
- Duration: 2019–2023
- First appearance: Episode 5901; 12 April 2019
- Last appearance: Episode 6817; 8 December 2023
- Introduced by: Kate Oates
In-universe information
- Father: Gray Atkins
- Mother: Chantelle Atkins
- Stepmother: Chelsea Fox
- Brothers: Mackenzie Atkins
- Half-brothers: Jordan Fox
- Grandfathers: Mitch Baker; Alex Atkins
- Grandmothers: Karen Taylor
- Uncles: Keegan Baker; Keanu Taylor; Chatham Taylor; Riley Taylor
- Aunts: Bernadette Taylor; Bailey Baker
- First cousins: Peggy Taylor
- Other relatives: Sheila Atkins; Kandice Taylor; Avery Baker; Felix Baker

Mia Atkins, played by Mahalia Malcolm, is the daughter of Chantelle Atkins (Jessica Plummer) and Gray Atkins (Toby-Alexander Smith). The character and casting were announced on 11 March 2019. Mia made her first appearance on 12 April.

Mia's parents married after a whirlwind romance when they found out they were expecting her. They had little contact with the Taylor family until arriving in Walford in 2019 when Chantelle is offered a job at Denise Fox's (Diane Parish) hair salon. Mia and Mackenzie enjoy spending time with their grandmother Karen Taylor (Lorraine Stanley) and are delighted when their father buys No. 1 Albert Square so they can be closer to their family. Shortly after this Mia meets her grandfather Mitch Baker (Roger Griffiths) for the first time when he wrongly assumes Gray is harassing Chantelle at The Queen Victoria public house. Mia and Mackenzie have no idea that Gray is physically and mentally abusing Chantelle and after returning home from a family holiday to Southend, they are devastated to find out that Chantelle has died. Unbeknownst to them, Chantelle was killed during an altercation with Gray. Mia and Mackenzie move in with Karen at Shirley Carter's (Linda Henry) insistence after she uncovers Gray's plot to kill himself and the children. Over the next 18 months Mack and Mia are looked after by a number of residents; initially Shirley and her sister Tina Carter (Luisa Bradshaw-White), followed by live-in nanny Whitney Dean (Shona McGarty) and then Gray's girlfriend Chelsea Fox (Zaraah Abrahams). Chelsea is not interested in Gray's children and frequently neglects them, resulting in Mia asking to stay with the Taylors. This changes when Chelsea becomes pregnant by Gray and they get engaged, resulting in her making the effort to get to know her future stepchildren. Chelsea later gives birth prematurely to Mackenzie and Mia's half-brother Jordan in December 2021. After Gray is arrested for the murders of Chantelle, Tina and Kush Kazemi (Davood Ghadami) in March 2022, Mia and Mackenzie start living with grandparents Karen and Mitch on a permanent basis.

The character made an unannounced departure from the show on 8 December 2023, along with grandparents Karen and Mitch, brother Mackenzie and aunt Bailey.

== Mackenzie Atkins ==
Mackenzie Atkins
- EastEnders character
- Portrayed by: Isaac Lemonius
- Duration: 2019–2023
- First appearance: Episode 5901; 12 April 2019
- Last appearance: Episode 6817; 8 December 2023
- Introduced by: Kate Oates
In-universe information
- Father: Gray Atkins
- Mother: Chantelle Atkins
- Stepmother: Chelsea Fox
- Sisters: Mia Atkins
- Half-brothers: Jordan Fox
- Grandfathers: Mitch Baker; Alex Atkins
- Grandmothers: Karen Taylor
- Uncles: Keegan Baker; Keanu Taylor; Chatham Taylor; Riley Taylor
- Aunts: Bernadette Taylor; Bailey Baker
- First cousins: Peggy Taylor
- Other relatives: Sheila Atkins; Kandice Taylor; Avery Baker; Felix Baker

Mackenzie Atkins, played by Isaac Lemonius, is the son of Chantelle Atkins (Jessica Plummer) and Gray Atkins (Toby-Alexander Smith). The character and casting were announced on 11 March 2019. Mackenzie made his first appearance on 12 April.

Mackenzie's parents married after a whirlwind romance when they found out they were expecting her. They had little contact with the Taylor family until arriving in Walford in 2019 when Chantelle is offered a job at Denise Fox's (Diane Parish) hair salon. Him and Mia enjoy spending time with their grandmother Karen Taylor (Lorraine Stanley) and are delighted when their father buys No. 1 Albert Square so they can be closer to their family. Shortly after this Mackenzie meets her grandfather Mitch Baker (Roger Griffiths) for the first time when he wrongly assumes Gray is harassing Chantelle at The Queen Victoria public house. Mia and Mackenzie have no idea that Gray is physically and mentally abusing Chantelle and after returning home from a family holiday to Southend, they are devastated to find out that Chantelle has died. Unbeknownst to them, Chantelle was killed during an altercation with Gray. Mia and Mackenzie move in with Karen at Shirley Carter's (Linda Henry) insistence after she uncovers Gray's plot to kill himself and the children. Over the next 18 months, Mackenzie and Mia are looked after by a number of residents; initially Shirley and her sister Tina Carter (Luisa Bradshaw-White), followed by live-in nanny Whitney Dean (Shona McGarty) and then Gray's girlfriend Chelsea Fox (Zaraah Abrahams). Chelsea is not interested in Gray's children and frequently neglects them, resulting in Mia asking to stay with the Taylors. This changes when Chelsea becomes pregnant by Gray and they get engaged, resulting in her making the effort to get to know her future stepchildren. Chelsea later gives birth prematurely to Mackenzie and Mia's half-brother Jordan in December 2021. After Gray is arrested for the murders of Chantelle, Tina and Kush Kazemi (Davood Ghadami) in March 2022, Mia and Mackenzie start living with grandparents Karen and Mitch on a permanent basis.

The character made an unannounced departure from the show on 8 December 2023.

== Daniel Cook ==
Daniel Cook
- EastEnders character
- Portrayed by: Adrian Edmondson
- Duration: 2019–2020
- First appearance: Episode 5944; 25 June 2019
- Last appearance: Episode 6087; 27 February 2020
- Introduced by: Kate Oates

Daniel Cook, played by Adrian Edmondson, is a love interest of Jean Slater (Gillian Wright). The character and Edmondson's casting were announced on 9 May 2019. He began appearing on 25 June 2019.

Daniel is first seen at Walford General, being difficult with the nurses, as witnessed by Jean Slater (Gillian Wright) and her daughter, Stacey Fowler (Lacey Turner). He later approaches Jean and attempts to initiate a conversation, but accidentally makes an offensive comment which causes Jean to slap him. Stacey later confronts him about making Jean angry. Daniel continues to be seen each time Jean visits the hospital and they start to grow close. In September 2019, Daniel reveals that his cancer has returned and is now terminal, and Jean promises to care for him. As her feelings for Daniel begin to blossom, and she gets excited about introducing him to Stacey, Jean receives a call from Daniel's neighbour saying that Daniel has died, having been discovered at his home. Jean attends his memorial alongside Kush Kazemi (Davood Ghadami), but it is revealed that Daniel faked his own death because he felt that he was getting too emotionally involved with Jean and did not want to put her through the pain of watching him die slowly. Two months later, Kush visits the hospital to give some magazines on Jean's behalf and bumps into Daniel. He persuades him to come back to Walford and tell Jean the truth but he refuses. Kush gives up and says goodbye.

On Christmas Day, Daniel returns to Walford contemplating telling Jean the truth when he discovers the Panesar brothers demanding back rent money from the Slaters in exchange for them not being evicted from their house. He quickly pays for the rent himself and re-introduces himself to Jean, who is furious at him for faking his death. She asks him for an explanation as to why he did it; he admits that it is because he was falling in love with her and knowing she was falling for him as well, he did not want her to go through the pain of saying goodbye to him on his deathbed. Touched, she kisses him passionately and assures him she will help him live out the rest of his time as fulfilling as possible. Daniel and Jean prank funeral directors Rainie Branning (Tanya Franks) and Stuart Highway (Ricky Champ) into thinking he is dying and wants a lavish funeral, guilt tripping them into giving them a ride in a horse driven carriage. However, when Daniel later discovers that he has weeks to live, he arranges a real funeral with Rainie.

When Daniel's condition worsens, he refuses to go into a hospice, and promises Jean that he will hold onto his life until she is cancer free. Jean goes to an appointment accompanied by Mo Harris (Laila Morse), and finds out her cancer is in remission. When Daniel asks about the appointment, she tells him that they have not got her results yet. However, Mo reveals that Jean is cancer free. The pair sit on a bench together, and he sends her away to get a hot chocolate; when she returns, Daniel has died.

Laura-Jayne Tyler from Inside Soap begged EastEnders to not kill Daniel off, writing that he was the "best new character in years and years and years".

== Jonno Highway ==
Jonno Highway
- EastEnders character
- Portrayed by: Richard Graham
- Duration: 2019, 2025
- First appearance: Episode 5947; 1 July 2019
- Last appearance: Episode 7188; 11 September 2025
- Introduced by: Kate Oates (2019); Ben Wadey (2025)
In-universe information
- Other names: John Highway
- Father: Freddie Highway
- Mother: Vi Highway
- Half-brothers: Christopher
- Sons: Stuart Highway; Callum Highway
- Grandsons: Roland Highway
- Granddaughters: Zara Highway

Jonno Highway, played by Richard Graham, is the father of Stuart Highway (Ricky Champ) and Callum Highway (Tony Clay). Jonno began appearing as a guest on 1 July 2019. Upon the red carpet at the 2019 British Soap Awards, Champ spoke to Radio Times about Graham's casting: "Richard comes in and it's an explosive little storyline. It illuminates a lot about Stuart and his brother Callum's upbringing. It was rough!" Clay spoke to Metro exclusively: "I think Jonno is the crutch of it all – you really see in him why Callum and Stuart have so many issues. You see where Stuart's aggression comes from and why Callum is so reluctant to come forward about how he feels as he has someone who has suppressed him and put him down all these years. It's all about Callum trying to be the man to prove himself to his dad – but that's not who he wants to be. He just wants his dad to be proud of him but he's never going to be because nothing he ever does is good enough. He has seen his dad be aggressive when he was younger – he has that hold over them still. The minute he walks back in, it's “here we go again”. But equally, there's a hope that it could all work out okay. Maybe they can do this and do the whole family thing, even with what did happen with Ben – but then again, it is EastEnders, isn't it? We've seen the impact that Stuart has had on the people of the Square and now you are going to see the root of that and that's in his dad. That can only bring a whirlwind. He's the life of the party but behind closed doors, he is something else entirely and he brings a real edge to the Square. You really start to see the root of Callum and Stuart's troubles – it'll be really interesting to watch. Viewers will hopefully start to get it – and that'll be the excitement."

Jonno is first seen in July 2019 after being contacted by his son Callum's fiancée, Whitney Dean (Shona McGarty). He has a disagreement with Ben Mitchell (Max Bowden) over gay pride and is confronted by his father, Phil (Steve McFadden). It is revealed that Jonno was not a good father to Callum or Stuart and would be violent towards Stuart. He reveals that he has changed and attempts to reconcile with his family. Jonno confronts Ben in the toilets and expresses his disgust with homosexuals, causing a fight between him and Ben. Jonno's true colours are exposed and Stuart threatens him out of Walford. Jonno returns two months later, wanting to find out how Callum's wedding went. When he discovers that the wedding was called off he confronts Callum about it, and Callum comes out as gay to his father. Disgusted, Jonno accuses Ben of turning him into "one of them", earning himself a punch from Phil in return. Jonno then leaves Walford, disowning Callum.

Jonno returns in September 2025 when he is arrested by Callum for assaulting Eve Panesar-Unwin (Heather Peace) in a homophobic attack. Callum's friend Johnny Carter (Charlie Suff) meets with Jonno acting as his legal representation, and through this discovers that Jonno has reached out to Callum in an attempt to make amends. Johnny persuades Callum to meet with Jonno, who laughs and ridicules Callum when he learns that Ben has been extradited and is serving a prison sentence in America, although apologises when he finds out that Callum has a stepdaughter from Ben, Lexi Pearce (Isabella Brown). Jonno informs Callum that he is dying, and needs money and a place to stay, leading to an argument. Jonno collapses and suffers a heart attack, and while Callum calls for help, Jonno asks Johnny to tell Callum that he will always be ashamed of him. Jonno dies, and when Callum asks what his last words were, Johnny lies and says that Jonno regretted how he treated Callum.

== Sheree Trueman ==
Sheree Trueman
- EastEnders character
- Portrayed by: Suzette Llewellyn
- Duration: 2019–2021
- First appearance: Episode 5965; 2 August 2019
- Last appearance: Episode 6351; 30 September 2021
- Introduced by: Jon Sen
In-universe information
- Occupation: Hairdresser
- Mother: Wanda Baptiste
- Stepfather: Dickie
- Husband: Eamonn (backstory); Patrick Trueman (2019–2021)
- Sons: Isaac Baptiste

Sheree Trueman, played by Suzette Llewellyn, is the third wife of Patrick Trueman (Rudolph Walker). The character and Llewellyn's casting were announced on 18 June 2019. Sheree made her first appearance on 2 August 2019. On 30 September 2021 Sheree made an unannounced exit from the show.

Sheree arrives in Walford with Patrick after his return from Trinidad where they reveal that they are now married. It is explained that Sheree has known Patrick for a long time. Denise Fox (Diane Parish), finds herself unable to trust her, and is left concerned for Patrick's wellbeing whilst being annoyed by her antics at their salon. After Ted Murray (Christopher Timothy) accidentally kisses Sheree in The Queen Victoria public house, Sheree arranges for Ted to meet her mother Wanda Baptiste (Anni Domingo). This results in Ted deciding to leave Walford with her but, as they are leaving, Sheree reveals to Denise that Wanda had previously faced questions from the police over the death of her last husband. Denise's worries increase with the discovery of a voicemail from Ted appearing to show him panicking, and she confronts Sheree about her mother. Sheree dismisses the allegations of her mother harming Ted, who is later revealed to be fine, but Denise remains convinced that something isn't right with her and remains adamant to find out what.

Denise overhears Sheree on the phone to a man named Isaac (Stevie Basaula), and assumes that she is cheating on Patrick. Denise confronts her and tells her to leave. However, when Isaac turns up in Walford, it is revealed that he is Sheree's son.

== Darryl Whisson ==
Darryl Whisson
- EastEnders character
- Portrayed by: Daniel Moore
- Duration: 2019–2020, 2022–2024
- First appearance: Episode 5975; 20 August 2019
- Last appearance: Episode 6891; 15 April 2024
- Introduced by: Jon Sen (2019); Chris Clenshaw (2022)
In-universe information
- Other names: DC Whisson
- Occupation: Police officer

DC Darryl Whisson, played by Daniel Moore, is a police officer who made two appearances from 20 August and 15 October 2019. He makes one appearance on 2 March 2020 before returning in 2022 on 22 February. He makes two appearances on 3 May and 27 December 2023. He returns in 2024, appearing between 9 January and 15 April 2024. He first appears in August 2019, and tells Mel Owen (Tamzin Outhwaite) that her son, Hunter (Charlie Winter) has escaped from prison. In October, he arrives at Kathy Beale's (Gillian Taylforth) home after a report of an assault. Kathy says she knows nothing about one but Rainie Branning (Tanya Franks) says she does and punches Kathy in the face. Whisson then arrests Rainie. On 2 March 2020, he restrains Keegan Butcher-Baker (Zack Morris), thinking he has just burgled a house and mistakenly lets the real burglar get away. On 22 February 2022, he investigates an attack on Gray Atkins (Toby-Alexander Smith) and questions Stacey Slater (Lacey Turner).

On 3 May 2023, now a Detective Constable, he arrests Ravi Gulati (Aaron Thiara) for an assault on Keanu Taylor (Danny Walters). On 27 December 2023, he interviews Kathy, Stacey, Linda Carter (Kellie Bright), Denise Fox (Diane Parish), and Sharon Watts (Letitia Dean), about the incidents in The Queen Victoria public house on Christmas Day. When Nish Panesar (Navin Chowdhry) awakens from an induced coma, Darryl questions him about the attack, where Nish informs him that Keanu was responsible, after his wife Suki (Balvinder Sopal) manipulates the truth, and exploits his amnesia to protect herself and the other women.

== Ash Panesar ==
Ash Panesar (also Kaur), played by Gurlaine Kaur Garcha, made her first appearance on 29 August 2019. Ash is introduced as the bisexual Sikh girlfriend of Iqra Ahmed (Priya Davdra), with whom she has been in a relationship with for over a year. Ash's identity was kept a secret due to Iqra being entered into an arranged marriage with a man.

== Leo King ==
Leo King
- EastEnders character
- Portrayed by: Tom Wells
- Duration: 2019–2020
- First appearance: Episode 5983; 3 September 2019
- Last appearance: Episode 6084; 21 February 2020 (appearance); Episode 6110; 28 April 2020 (voiceover)
- Introduced by: Jon Sen
In-universe information
- Other names: Leo Cameron
- Father: Tony King
- Mother: Michaela Turnbull

Leo King, played by Tom Wells, makes his first appearance on 3 September 2019. He was unnamed until episode 5990 on 9 September 2019. Details of the character and storyline were also announced on the same day. Leo is the son of paedophile Tony King (Chris Coghill), who abused Whitney Dean (Shona McGarty) as a child. Wells expressed his delight in joining the cast, adding, "I'm really excited to be joining the EastEnders team and seeing what's in store for Leo". Wells also commented that "He's definitely a man not to be trusted". Executive producer Jon Sen also added "Bianca's return sparks a gripping new story with the arrival of Leo King – a dark and misguided figure who has grown up with the stigma of being the son of a convicted paedophile. We are thrilled to welcome Tom to the Square, knowing he will bring depth and complexity to the role of Leo, a man who believes his father has been wronged and who will also go to great lengths to prove it". The character was killed-off in February 2020; his departure had not been announced beforehand. On-screen, Whitney stabs Leo in self defence after he tries attacking her with a knife.

Leo first appears as a guest at Whitney's wedding to Callum Highway (Tony Clay). He flirts with Whitney's adoptive half-sister, Tiffany Butcher (Maisie Smith), and proceeds into pecking her cheek, which is witnessed by Tiffany's mother Bianca Jackson (Patsy Palmer). Bianca warns Leo to stay away. However, Leo arrives in Walford and begins menacing Bianca. It is revealed that he is the son of Bianca's ex-boyfriend Tony and believes that Whitney had lied about Tony sexually abusing her. He threatens Bianca about money his grandmother had left him and threatens to hurt both Whitney and Tiffany if he does not receive the money.

Whitney returns to Walford and announces that she been talking to a new man. The man is revealed to be Leo and he picks her up in his car. Leo and Whitney's fling continues, however Whitney introduces him to Tiffany whom he had kissed during Whitney's wedding. Tiffany reveals his identity, but Whitney continues to meet with him. Whilst in E20, Whitney confides with Leo about her past relationships and he tries to push for more information about her relationship with his father, but he fails to get it. Soon afterwards Whitney tells him that she is not after a relationship. In an attempt to drive Whitney and Callum apart, Leo finds a video of Callum doing nothing when his friend attempts to rape an unconscious girl at a party.

Leo confronts Whitney on a balcony, and when Kush Kazemi (Davood Ghadami) sees them, he goes to help Whitney, but accidentally pushes Leo over the balcony. While in hospital, Whitney visits him in the hope that he will not press charges against Kush. He finds a notebook in her bag, detailing all of their interactions. Leo makes Whitney go into the pub and tell everyone that Tony was innocent, and leaves. He begins hiding in Whitney's loft, spying on her from a hole in the ceiling. When she is alone, he confronts her, and the pair fight, ending in Whitney stabbing him in self defence. His dead body is left on her kitchen floor.

== Jags Panesar ==
Jags Panesar, played by Amar Adatia, made his first appearance on 4 October 2019. He is the second eldest of the three Panesar brothers, the others being his older brother Kheerat (Jaz Deol) and younger brother Vinny (Shiv Jalota). The family is described as a British Asian family of Punjabi Sikh heritage. The character and Adatia's casting were announced on 21 August 2019. Jags is described as someone who "has always struggled in the shadow of his older brother and despite his best intentions, nothing ever seems to go to plan for try-hard Jags leaving Kheerat and the rest of the family constantly unimpressed." Producer Jon Sen said of the family "The Panesar family are set arrive this autumn and will bring their own unique blend of charm and chaos onto the Square. A British Asian family of Punjabi Sikh heritage, Kheerat, Jags and Vinny are three very different brothers who turn up in Walford looking to settle a score – however, fate quickly takes a hand and they find themselves staying for good. We're thrilled to be introducing this vibrant new family to Walford and to be sharing their stories." Of his casting, Adatia said, "My younger self would never have believed I'd be on EastEnders. It's pretty amazing to be part of one of the most iconic television shows alongside some of the best actors in the business. I really am so grateful." On 26 September 2020, it was announced that Adatia would be departing from his role as Jags as part of a "dark storyline". Adatia made his final appearance in an episode broadcast on 9 October 2020. The character was killed off-screen on 24 June 2021 after being attacked in prison.

== Kheerat Panesar ==
Kheerat Panesar, played by Jaz Singh Deol, made his first appearance on 4 October 2019. He is the eldest of three brothers, the others being Jags (Amar Adatia) and Vinny Panesar (Shiv Jalota). The family is described as a British Asian family of Punjabi Sikh heritage. The character and Deol's casting were announced on 21 August 2019. Kheerat is described as a "successful businessman who knows exactly what he wants and how to get it" and that he "uses his persuasiveness and charm to his advantage in every situation" Producer Jon Sen said of the family "The Panesar family are set arrive this autumn and will bring their own unique blend of charm and chaos onto the Square. A British Asian family of Punjabi Sikh heritage, Kheerat, Jags and Vinny are three very different brothers who turn up in Walford looking to settle a score – however, fate quickly takes a hand and they find themselves staying for good. We're thrilled to be introducing this vibrant new family to Walford and to be sharing their stories." Of his casting, Deol said, "I'm very proud and excited to be joining such an iconic show and bringing to life a character that is a reflection of the cultural background that I and many others come from in today's modern Britain. I can't wait to get started and for viewers to meet the Panesars." Deol made an unannounced departure from the show on 10 November 2022, when Kheerat falsely confessed to murder, to protect his family.

== Vinny Panesar ==
Vinny Panesar
- EastEnders character
- Portrayed by: Shiv Jalota
- Duration: 2019–present
- First appearance: Episode 6015; 29 October 2019
- Introduced by: Jon Sen
In-universe information
- Other names: Parvinder Panesar
- Occupation: DJ; Businessman
- Family: Panesar
- Father: Nish Panesar
- Mother: Suki Panesar
- Stepmother: Eve Panesar-Unwin
- Brothers: Kheerat Panesar; Jags Panesar
- Sisters: Ash Panesar
- Half-brothers: Ravi Gulati
- Nephews: Davinder "Nugget" Gulati; Tyrion Ahmed
- Nieces: Avani Nandra-Hart

Vinny Panesar, played by Shiv Jalota, made his first appearance on 29 October 2019. He is the youngest of the Panesar brothers, the others being Kheerat (Jaz Deol) and Jags (Amar Adatia). The family is described as a British Asian family of Punjabi Sikh heritage. The character and Jalota's casting were announced on 21 August 2019. Vinny is described as "the golden boy of the family; he's sweet, bright and has been indulged since the day he was born. However people shouldn't be fooled by Vinny's innocent exterior, he's no angel and it's safe to say trouble is often close by." Producer Jon Sen said of the family "The Panesar family are set arrive this autumn and will bring their own unique blend of charm and chaos onto the Square. A British Asian family of Punjabi Sikh heritage, Kheerat, Jags and Vinny are three very different brothers who turn up in Walford looking to settle a score – however, fate quickly takes a hand and they find themselves staying for good. We're thrilled to be introducing this vibrant new family to Walford and to be sharing their stories." Of his casting, Jalota said, "It still hasn't sunk in that I'm going to be on EastEnders. As a young boy, I remember being introduced to the Masood family and thinking there are people like me on television. To be part of that next generation of people representing my identity is a blessing. I couldn't be more excited."

Vinny arrives on Albert Square with his brothers in search of their sister Ash Kaur (Gurlaine Kaur Garcha). Vinny eventually tracks her down, and reveals to her that their mother, Suki (Balvinder Sopal), is dying of cancer. Ash refuses to visit because of how she was treated by her and Vinny expresses upset at Ash cutting him out of her life when she left home.

== Peggy Taylor ==
Peggy Taylor
- EastEnders character
- Portrayed by: Uncredited (2019–2020); Hallie (2023)
- Duration: 2019–2020, 2023
- First appearance: Episode 6036; 6 December 2019
- Last appearance: Episode 6736; 20 July 2023
- Introduced by: Jon Sen (2019); Chris Clenshaw (2023)
In-universe information
- Other names: Peggy Mitchell Jnr
- Family: Mitchell
- Father: Keanu Taylor
- Mother: Louise Mitchell
- Grandfathers: Phil Mitchell
- Grandmothers: Lisa Fowler; Karen Taylor
- Uncles: Ben Mitchell; Keegan Baker; Riley Taylor; Chatham Taylor; Raymond Dawkins; Albie Watts
- Aunts: Chantelle Atkins; Bernadette Taylor
- First cousins: Mackenzie Atkins; Mia Atkins; Lexi Pearce
- Other relatives: Peggy Mitchell; Grant Mitchell; Sam Mitchell; Courtney Mitchell; Aunt Sal; Ricky Branning

Peggy Taylor (also Mitchell) is the daughter of Louise Mitchell (Tilly Keeper) and Keanu Taylor (Danny Walters). She is named after Louise's deceased grandmother, Peggy Mitchell (Barbara Windsor). She was born just before it was revealed that Keanu was the father of Louise's stepmother Sharon Mitchell's (Letitia Dean) unborn baby. As a result, they broke up and Louise moved to Portugal on 24 January 2020 with her mother, Lisa Fowler (Lucy Benjamin).

In July 2023, it was announced that Peggy would be returning to EastEnders briefly, alongside Lisa. They returned on 10 July 2023 and departed on 20 July 2023. She was played by Hallie upon return. Speaking to Radio Times about working with Hallie, Benjamin said: "I think at one point, she even turned and said, when they were improvising – I think there was a scene with Keanu, and is it [Karen] that works in the laundrette? And she just said, I think they said 'get out my laundrette!' and she said 'get out my pub!' Little Peggy said 'get out my pub!'" Benjamin also praised her young co-star: "Oh my god, she was amazing. She was totally fantastic, and adorable. I mean, talk about scene-stealing! I mean, she honestly was gorgeous. But yeah, we built a really lovely chemistry. I've not seen her on-screen yet, but I'm really looking forward to seeing it because she's just, she was a natural. I mean, it was just a gift, she's a delight. She's got some lovely [scenes], she does. She had a couple of lines that were written in the scripts. I thought, 'I don't know how they're gonna get her to say these lines.' But you kind of prepped her. I said, 'I'll say this. And then d'you want to try and say that?' and it just kept running and kept running. And she would do it. I honestly can't wait to see how she comes across on-screen."

== Michaela Turnbull ==
Michaela Turnbull
- EastEnders character
- Portrayed by: Fiona Allen
- Duration: 2019–2020
- First appearance: Episode 6037; 9 December 2019
- Last appearance: Episode 6111; 4 May 2020
- Introduced by: Jon Sen
In-universe information
- Sons: Leo King

Michaela Turnbull, played by Fiona Allen, first appears in episode 6037, originally broadcast on 9 December 2019.

Michaela is the mother of Leo King (Tom Wells), and the ex-wife of Tony King (Chris Coghill). Michaela arrives in Walford after finding out that Leo has been staying there, and when she finds out that he has been in contact with Whitney Dean (Shona McGarty), who her ex-husband groomed, she tries to force him to go home with her. However, Leo slams her to the ground and hits her with his briefcase. After Leo asks Whitney for the truth, he realises that Tony did abuse Whitney. He releases Michaela from the boot of her car and says she was right about Tony and should have believed her, but Michaela calls him "sick" and drives away. When she learns that Leo has died, she takes Whitney hostage. Michaela reveals to her that she knew about Tony grooming her, but did nothing to stop him.

Paul Simper of Radio Times wrote: "The irony is that Michaela should be Whitney's saviour. It's high time she put the sisterhood first and ended both families' circles of abuse once and for all."

== DI Steve Thompson ==
DI Steve Thompson
- EastEnders character
- Portrayed by: Philip Wright
- Duration: 2019–2021
- First appearance: Episode 6045; 23 December 2019
- Last appearance: Episode 6198; 5 January 2021
- Introduced by: Jon Sen
In-universe information
- Occupation: Detective Inspector

Detective Inspector Steve Thompson, played by Philip Wright, first appears in episode 6045, originally broadcast on 23 December 2019. Uncredited during his first appearance, he makes his first credited appearance in episode 6063, originally broadcast on 16 January 2020.

DI Thompson is first seen as a colleague of Jack Branning's (Scott Maslen), when they witness Callum Highway (Tony Clay) attacking Leo King (Tom Wells) and break up the fight. The following month, Thompson questions Karen Taylor (Lorraine Stanley), Phil Mitchell (Steve McFadden) and Ben Mitchell (Max Bowden) about the disappearance of Keanu Taylor (Danny Walters). Karen says she is not worried about her son, while Phil reveals that Keanu had an affair with Phil's wife, Sharon Mitchell (Letitia Dean), and got her pregnant and Ben says they were in the pub when Keanu disappeared. He later arrests Phil and Ben for Keanu's murder and presents Phil with evidence at the police station. DI Thompson later speaks with Sharon about the whereabouts of her son, Dennis Rickman (Bleu Landau), who she believes Phil has taken abroad. Ben tries to speak to Thompson, who rebuffs him and warns him that although they are unaware of Phil's whereabouts, they are watching Ben. When Phil hands himself into the police for the causing a boat crash on the River Thames, DI Thompson questions him about this and his involvement with Keanu. He clashes with Phil's lawyer, Ritchie Scott (Sian Webber), when she pauses the interview. Sharon changes the statement she made about Phil, so to his fury, DI Thompson has to release Phil.

Thompson appears at the scene of Vinny Panesar's (Shiv Jalota) illegal rave with other police officers when a brick is thrown at the window of a police car. He notices Keegan (Zack Morris) and Tiffany Butcher-Baker (Maisie Smith) leaving the scene and arrests Keegan for criminal damage and obstruction. He then threatens to arrest Tiffany too. At the station, Jack speaks to him about Keegan's arrest. DI Thompson reads Keegan's previous convictions and explains the situation to Jack, but lies that Keegan threw the brick, insulted him and resisted arrest. Later, Jack speaks to DI Thompson while he is having a cigarette. Jack explains that he viewed the body camera footage from the arrest and is unsure whether Keegan is responsible, which annoys DI Thompson as he sees this as Jack not trusting him. DI Thompson questions Keegan, presenting to him the footage; Keegan threatens to report DI Thompson for the injuries sustained to him during the arrest, but he claims that it is a result of Keegan resisting arrest. Keegan is then released on bail. After footage of the arrest, featuring DI Thompson, is recovered, Jack shows it to Keegan and Tiffany.

At the police station, Thompson warns Callum, now a police constable, about an arrest he made earlier that day; he tells him that the man he arrested has claimed that Callum used excessive force and has gone to A&E to be assessed. He then instructs Callum to search through some CCTV footage of a warehouse as part of his operation to arrest criminal Danny Hardcastle (Paul Usher). Callum spots a blurred image of Ben on the footage which DI Thompson says he will have enhanced and Callum tries to avoid this. Thompson and Jack interview Danny after he is found with a bag of money in his car boot. Danny claims that he has been set up, but refuses to say who did it. Later that day, Thompson arrests Ben on suspicion of armed robbery at the warehouse; Ben refuses to answer his questions. During the arrest, Thompson spots Callum at Ben's house and later, he confronts Callum, quickly realising that he is Ben's partner. Thompson reminds Callum that relationships with convicted criminals should be declared, so blackmails him into helping him to convict Phil in return for his silence and Ben's freedom. Thompson pressures Callum into making a decision. When Callum declines the deal, he warns him that Ben would not do the same for him, so he should reconsider his decision. Ritchie asks for Ben to be released, but Thompson claims that he is giving them an opportunity to prove Ben's innocence, while he awaits Callum's decision. Ben is later released after Callum agrees to Thompson's deal to convict Phil. He later meets with Callum to congratulate him on his decision and convince him that he made the right choice. Thompson and Callum meet again after Phil offers Callum information about his future deals. After Phil asks Callum to perform a police check, Callum informs Thompson, who states that that is not enough evidence to imprison Phil for years. Thompson tells Callum that the team was impressed with how he dealt with a road traffic collision and reminds him that he has opportunity to find evidence on Phil, before asking him to place a recorder in Phil's repair garage, The Arches. Thompson later gives Callum a wire to wear for recording incriminating conversations with Phil. Callum meets him again to withdraw from the operation; Thompson reveals that the operation is not legal, before threatening to expose Callum for assaulting Danny if he reveals the operation. Callum speaks to Thompson about requesting information on Ellie Nixon (Mica Paris); Thompson explains that Ellie used a fake surname and is a known criminal. Callum asks for information on Ellie to give to Phil, claiming that he will help their operation in the long term. Later, DI Thompson meets with Jack, who informs him that Phil kidnapped and attacked him ten months earlier. Jack never reported the crime, so he asks Thompson to claim that he wrote the report, but it went missing. Thompson is hesitant as he is worried about his illegal operation, so Jack decides to do it without his support.

After DI Thompson is caught threatening Callum, he is punched by Stuart Highway (Ricky Champ). Later, Stuart follows Thompson and confronts him. When Thompson taunts Stuart about Callum, he punches him, knocking him out. Believing he has killed Thompson, Stuart moves him to the undertakers and places him in a coffin. After failing to check on him in the days afterwards, Stuart learns that Thompson was seen at a disciplinary hearing and realises he had survived and escaped the coffin. Stuart is later taken in for questioning, with Thompson threatening to charge him for attempted murder unless Callum pushes further in his efforts to take down Phil. A panicked Callum tells Jack about the situation. Jack blackmails Thompson into giving up his pursuit of Phil unless he wants his dodgy dealings revealed. After Thompson hands over all of his evidence, Jack persuades him to retire from the police.

== Other characters ==
Character	Episode date(s)	Actor	Circumstances
Indy	1 January	Uncredited	Colleagues of Ray Kelly's (Sean Mahon), who attend his wedding to Mel Owen (Tamzin Outhwaite). Jay Brown (Jamie Borthwick) is attracted to Naomi and plans to speak to her.
Daniel	1 January	Uncredited	Colleagues of Ray Kelly's (Sean Mahon), who attend his wedding to Mel Owen (Tamzin Outhwaite). Jay Brown (Jamie Borthwick) is attracted to Naomi and plans to speak to her.
Naomi	1 January	Uncredited	Colleagues of Ray Kelly's (Sean Mahon), who attend his wedding to Mel Owen (Tamzin Outhwaite). Jay Brown (Jamie Borthwick) is attracted to Naomi and plans to speak to her.
Ellis	1 January	Uncredited	A baby who cries at Ray Kelly's (Sean Mahon) wedding to Mel Owen (Tamzin Outhwaite). Ellis's father takes him outside the church.
PC Nawaz	1–3 January (2 episodes)	Subika Anwar-Khan	Police officers. PC Nawaz arrests Ray Kelly (Sean Mahon) on suspicion of bigamy after his wedding to Mel Owen (Tamzin Outhwaite). While Ray is in the car, he fakes a heart attack and PC Bentley gets him out of the car and puts him in the recovery position. Ray then takes Bentley's taser and uses it on him, then threatens to use it on Nawaz. He then locks them both in the back of the car and makes his escape; Nawaz suspects Ray has done something more than bigamy.
PC Bentley	3 January	Ewan Pollitt	Police officers. PC Nawaz arrests Ray Kelly (Sean Mahon) on suspicion of bigamy after his wedding to Mel Owen (Tamzin Outhwaite). While Ray is in the car, he fakes a heart attack and PC Bentley gets him out of the car and puts him in the recovery position. Ray then takes Bentley's taser and uses it on him, then threatens to use it on Nawaz. He then locks them both in the back of the car and makes his escape; Nawaz suspects Ray has done something more than bigamy.
DS Barnes	4 January – 14 February (6 episodes)	Alwyne Taylor	Two police officers who arrive at Mel Owen's (Tamzin Outhwaite) house, looking for her husband, Ray Kelly (Sean Mahon), after he escapes police custody following his arrest for bigamy. DS Barnes informs Mel and her son, Hunter Owen (Charlie Winter) about the escape and questions them about Ray's whereabouts. Mel says she would never help him after what he did and says she hopes she does not see him; Barnes says she would hope the same if she was in that situation and says she will be in touch as the police still need a statement from Mel about the bigamy and leaves after telling Mel that the longer it takes to find Ray, the longer it will concern her.
DC Lee Fletcher	4 January	Uncredited	
Cameron "Rat" Morris	10–11 January (3 episodes)	Kai O'Loughlin	A 12-year-old boy who Tiffany Butcher (Maisie Smith) finds in Ted Murray's (Christopher Timothy) flat, which Evie Steele (Sophia Capasso) has been using as a base for her drug dealing while Ted is away. Evie tells Tiffany that Rat has been in and out of care since he was very young and will be fine as he is about to do his first drugs delivery. Evie explains that she nicknamed him Rat so that he would do whatever she wants in the hope of earning a better nickname. Rat tells Tiffany that he is due to travel with Simmo, so Tiffany meets Simmo and tells him that Evie wants her to take over, despite Evie asking her to lie low. When Tiffany tells Rat that she is coming with him instead of Simmo, he tells her his real name is Cameron, or "Cammie". Tiffany's friend, Bernadette Taylor (Clair Norris), inadvertently reveals to Evie that Tiffany is doing the job, so Evie manipulates her into travelling with Tiffany and Rat. Rat takes the drugs from Tiffany's bag. Police enter their train and search Bernadette and Rat for drugs following a tip-off, but find nothing, however, Tiffany worries that Rat has swallowed the drugs and when they get off the train, he collapses. Tiffany and Bernadette get someone to call an ambulance and deny they know him to the police and then return home. Evie later takes Tiffany to the hospital but Rat is fine, and Bernadette finds out that Rat faked the collapse and had planted the drugs on Bernadette and Evie had called the police but they arrived too early and the plan to have Bernadette arrested failed.
Craig	10 January	Andrew Armitage	A drug addict who owes money to Evie Steele (Sophia Capasso). She sees him and pushes him down some stairs, threatening more harm if he does not pay her. He breaks into Mitch Baker's (Roger Griffiths) van but is shocked when Bailey (Kara-Leah Fernandes) is in there and hits him on the head. Later, he enters Max Branning's (Jake Wood) home when the door is left open and steals cash from a tin, which he offers to Evie but she is angry and the cash falls to the floor and Craig picks it up.
Simmo	10 January	Uncredited	A drug dealer who works for Evie Steele (Sophia Capasso). Tiffany Butcher (Maisie Smith) meets him and tells him that Evie wants her to do his delivery instead.
Caden James	11 January (2 episodes)	Abdul Salis	A football coach who Mitch Baker (Roger Griffiths) and Mick Carter (Danny Dyer) find hiding from the children he is meant to be coaching. Caden tells them he cannot continue because of the abuse he receives from the children and their parents, including verbal, physical and online. Mick and Mitch convince Caden to coach the team with them but he walks away when he tells them the children are just lulling them into a false sense of security. They take him back to the Vic but he quits and says they should coach the team. He is credited as Caden but his surname is revealed through dialogue.
Megan	14–21 January (3 episodes)	Shauna McLean	A mother who Mick Carter (Danny Dyer) and Mitch Baker (Roger Griffiths) meet while coaching football.
John Phillips	15 January	Mensah Bediako	The father of a man, Josh, who has died in a motorway pile-up on the way to his wedding. Josh had taken out one of Alfie Moon's (Shane Richie) funeral plans for the under-30s, and John tracks down Alfie. At first, Alfie denies being Alfie, but Alfie's wife, Kat Moon (Jessie Wallace), reveals his identity. John says he has to arrange Josh's funeral but the funeral home have never heard of Alfie's company, Blue Moon Funerals, accusing Alfie of stealing Josh's money and threatening to call the police. Alfie says he will sort it within an hour and after Alfie manipulates his friend Ian Beale (Adam Woodyatt) into investing in the business, Alfie meets John and afterwards, Alfie tells Kat that everything is fine.
Rabbi Mordecai Feldman	18 January – 19 February (2 episodes)	Simon Schatzberger	A rabbi who tells Dr. Harold Legg (Leonard Fenton) that the people who vandalised his parents' graves the previous year have been found and takes him to meet the three youths. He later conducts Dr Legg's funeral.
Eddy	18 January	Reice O'Leary	Two children who are part of a football team coached by Mick Carter (Danny Dyer) and Mitch Baker (Roger Griffiths). Mick promises that Alyssa can play up front because she says her grandmother has died but Mitch tells Mick that she is probably lying. Alyssa later goes to the park with her older sister, Brooke (Ria Lopez), where she plays football with Mitch's daughter, Bailey Baker (Kara-Leah Fernandes).
Alyssa	18 January – 29 April (2 episodes)	Lillia Turner	Two children who are part of a football team coached by Mick Carter (Danny Dyer) and Mitch Baker (Roger Griffiths). Mick promises that Alyssa can play up front because she says her grandmother has died but Mitch tells Mick that she is probably lying. Alyssa later goes to the park with her older sister, Brooke (Ria Lopez), where she plays football with Mitch's daughter, Bailey Baker (Kara-Leah Fernandes).
Dr Hannah Jansson	18 January	Josie Benson	A doctor who tells Kat Moon (Jessie Wallace) that Hayley Slater (Katie Jarvis) has no brain damage, just broken ribs, after being hit by a minibus.
Trey	18–24 January (2 episodes)	Sonnyboy Skelton	One of three youths who Dr. Harold Legg (Leonard Fenton) meets when they are found after vandalising Dr Legg's parents' graves. Trey says they were just messing and did not think about the consequences and apologises. Dr Legg and Rabbi Mordecai Feldman (Simon Schatzberger) explain that they should not be made to feel unwelcome in their home and Trey nods. However, later, the three youths are seen running from Dot Branning's (June Brown) house were Dr Legg is staying, having sprayed a swastika on the front door. Trey also appears in footage recorded by Dennis Rickman (Bleu Landau) via his drone that proves that Stuart Highway (Ricky Champ) was not the vandal.
Crystal	21 January – 11 February (2 episodes)	Tuyen Do	A nurse who speaks to Hayley Slater (Katie Jarvis) after she is hospitalised after being hit by a minibus. Crystal asks if Hayley stepped in front of the minibus on purpose but Hayley says she did not know what she was doing. Hayley discharges herself but later returns and opens up to Crystal that she cries all the time and thinks about harming herself. Crystal tells Hayley that her son has night terrors and admits Hayley to a psychiatric ward.
DS James Alexander	21 January	Neil Ditt	A police officer who asks Stuart Highway (Ricky Champ) to provide a witness statement after Dot Branning's (June Brown) door is sprayed with racist graffiti aimed at Dr Legg (Leonard Fenton), causing Dr. Legg to suffer chest pains and be hospitalised.
PC Anthony Rogers	24 January – 16 September (3 episodes)	Peter Basham	A police officer who visits Kat Moon (Jessie Wallace), telling her that her husband Alfie Moon's (Shane Richie) car was found abandoned at the edge of a cliff and he may be dead but no body has been found. He later attends the scene after Dinah Wilson's suicide and finds her suicide note. He informs Mitch Baker (Roger Griffiths) and Karen Taylor (Lorraine Stanley) that there will be an inquest into the death.
Liv	29 January	Jessie Lawrence	A woman in E20 nightclub who Hunter Owen (Charlie Winter) talks to. She says she has seen him talking to every woman in the club already, so he says he saved the best until last. She says she has to go home and that he is too young for her. He says it is her loss and he has done things that no other man in the club has done. She asks if he has a gun in his pocket and leaves.
Mr and Mrs Hendy	4 February	Uncredited	Customers at Coker & Mitchell Funeral Directors after Mrs Hendy's father dies. However, they leave when Ruby Allen (Louisa Lytton) confronts funeral director Jay Brown (Jamie Borthwick) over having sex with her and then leaving in the morning without saying anything.
Justin	7–8 February (2 episodes)	Joseph Beattie	A businessman who is overheard by Jay Brown (Jamie Borthwick) in Walford East restaurant saying he needs an event organiser for an upcoming event. Jay tells his date, Ruby Allen (Louisa Lytton), who is an events organiser, to talk to Justin, but she does not want to, so Jay interrupts Justin and gives him Ruby's business card. The next day, Ruby calls Justin and they meet in the café. Justin later telephones Ruby to tell her she has got the contract.
DC Hazari	11–12 February (2 episodes)	Anna Leong Brophy	A police officer investigating Ray Kelly's (Sean Mahon) death along with DS Barnes (Alwyne Taylor). Hazari and Barnes inform Ray's wife, Mel Owen (Tamzin Outhwaite) that Ray is dead. While Barnes interviews Mel, Hazari questions her former partner, Jack Branning (Scott Maslen). He gives Mel and her son, Hunter Owen (Charlie Winter), an alibi and Hazari warns Jack about giving a false statement. He then signs his statement.
Dr Elinor Waters	11 February – 27 August (3 episodes)	Esther Hall	A GP visited by Jean Slater (Gillian Wright), who is worried about stomach pains. Dr Waters takes her blood pressure, and as Jean describes her symptoms, Dr Waters feels her abdomen and tells Jean she will refer her for blood tests and an ultrasound and to see a gynaecologist, revealing she felt a mass. Jean realises that Dr Waters thinks that Jean could have cancer. Jean later visits Dr Waters again when her daughter, Stacey Fowler (Lacey Turner) forces her to go because Stacey thinks Jean's bipolar disorder medication may need adjusting. Jean tells Dr Waters she is fine and walks out when Dr Waters mentions ovarian cancer.
Kelvin	14 February	Kem Croft	A man in the E20 nightclub who Mo Harris (Laila Morse) sees and tells Kat Moon (Jessie Wallace) he is a city banker who bought a Valentine's Day T-shirt from her for £50. Kat decides to flirt with him but he says he was mugged into buying the T-shirt. Mo then walks over and Kat tells Kelvin that Mo is her grandmother; Kelvin then leaves.
Steph	19 February	Sally Hodgkiss	An employee of Go-Cater London who is covering the Walford East restaurant until the new owners can take over, however, Habiba Ahmed (Rukku Nahar) and Iqra Ahmed (Priya Davdra) send her home as they want to cover the restaurant instead.
Tim	22 February	Jamie Hogarth	A customer of Maximum Motors who tries to get a discount on a car but Rainie Branning (Tanya Franks) refuses.
Lewis	25 February	Jason Riddington	A man who leaves Rainie Branning's (Tanya Franks) home in the morning while she is asleep. He later arrives at a promotional event at Walford East restaurant and when Rainie sees him, she asks if anything happened between them. He says they only kissed but when she talked about her husband, it was a turn-off. Ruby Allen (Louisa Lytton) then talks to Lewis about his business's website and he grabs her bottom so she tells him not to touch her and asks him to leave. He calls her a "snowflake millennial" before he goes.
Rachel	25 February	Katrina Kleve	A photographer who takes photos at a promotional event at Walford East restaurant.
Mickey	25 February	Uncredited	A DJ at a promotional event at Walford East restaurant.
DS Todd	25 February	Geff Francis	A police officer who goes to Ruby Allen's (Louisa Lytton) flat with a colleague looking for her but Jay Brown (Jamie Borthwick) says she is out for the night. Todd finds Ruby at the promotional event at Walford East restaurant and arrests her on suspicion of sexual assault of Blake Turner (Makir Ahmed) who used to work for her. He then interviews her at the police station.
DC Rankin	25 February	Uncredited	A colleague of DS Todd's who is present when Ruby Allen (Louisa Lytton) is interviewed in relation to an allegation of sexual assault.
Blake Turner	26 February	Makir Ahmed	A former employee of Ruby Allen's (Louisa Lytton). After she is arrested on suspicion of sexual assault on Blake, they meet to discuss what happened. She says they had consensual sex but he says that as she was his boss, when she came onto him at the office Christmas party, he felt obliged to have sex with her and then date her for fear of being sacked, which he was when their relationship ended. She says she had to sack someone and he was not up to the job and she asks if this accusation is revenge for her firing him. He admits he was bad at the job but says that was why he had to go along with her advances. He leaves but she follows him and asks if someone put him up to the accusation, as her rapists are due in court soon. He says his girlfriend did, as she helped him see what happened for what it really was. He says she has to realise that she cannot get away with what she said, so she apologises and says she did not know that he did not want to have sex with her. She tells him to do what he feels is right. However, Ruby later finds out that Blake has dropped the allegation. He is credited as Blake but his surname is revealed on screen.
Rory	26 February – 14 March (2 episodes)	Ben Rufus Green	The facilitator at a Narcotics Anonymous meeting. Rainie Branning (Tanya Franks) attends the meeting but hides when she sees Stuart Highway (Ricky Champ), who has known Rory for a long time due to his history with drug addiction. He later runs another meeting attended by Rainie and Stuart and thanks them both for their comments.
Larry	26 February	Uncredited	Friends of Patrick Trueman (Rudolph Walker) who get their hair cut by Mitch Baker (Roger Griffiths).
Georgi	26 February	Uncredited	Friends of Patrick Trueman (Rudolph Walker) who get their hair cut by Mitch Baker (Roger Griffiths).
Mr Rothman	26 February	Uncredited	Friends of Patrick Trueman (Rudolph Walker) who get their hair cut by Mitch Baker (Roger Griffiths).
Douglas Fayed	1 March	Ashraf Ejjbair	A social worker who is in charge of monitoring Bailey Baker's (Kara-Leah Fernandes) care. He visits Bailey's father, Mitch Baker (Roger Griffiths), saying that Social Services are trying to help but Mitch is not returning their calls. He says that as Bailey's mother, Dinah Wilson's (Anjela Lauren Smith) illness is in its final stages, Bailey's handover care plan needs to be implemented. Douglas realises that Mitch has not informed Bailey's school and gives him another copy of the plan.
Claire Amartey	1 March – 5 April (5 episodes)	Eva Fontaine	Ruby Allen's (Louisa Lytton) new SOIT Officer, who Ruby calls to say she wants to drop the charges against Ross Swinden (Ossian Luke) and Matt Clarkson (Mitchell Hunt), who raped her. Claire visits Ruby later and says that Blake Turner (Makir Ahmed) has dropped an allegation of sexual assault against her and explains that she was once assaulted and dropped the charges but the man assaulted someone else who went on to commit suicide, so Ruby later tells Claire she wants to continue with the charges against Ross and Matt. Claire then meets Ruby on the day of the trial.
Kenneth Foskett	1 March	Barry James	Dr. Harold Legg's (Leonard Fenton) solicitor, from Foskett and Hathaway. He visits Dot Branning (June Brown) to read Dr Legg's will, which reveals that Dr Legg has left Dot his entire estate.
PC Olsen	5 March – 21 April 2022 (5 episodes)	Tanya-Loretta Dee	
Jerry	7–11 March (2 episodes)	Andrew Jarvis	The owner of a caravan in which Jean Slater (Gillian Wright) is staying, though Jerry thinks her name is Petronella Mills. Jerry offers to sell the caravan to Jean and she agrees. Later, Jerry interrupts Jean while she is on the phone to her daughter, Stacey Fowler (Lacey Turner), and Stacey hears him call Jean "Petronella", allowing Stacey to work out where Jean is staying.
Dr Kennedy	7–14 March (2 episodes)	Colette Brown	A doctor at Lowe Park private health clinic, who is visited by Kat Moon (Jessie Wallace) and Martin Fowler (James Bye). Kat poses as Jean Slater (Gillian Wright) to try to get Jean's cancer test results but Dr Kennedy knows Jean so tells Kat she will not give her the results as they are confidential. She tells Kat to make sure Jean attends her appointment and takes Kat out of the room when Kat cries and Martin takes the opportunity to look at Dr Kennedy's computer screen, where he sees "CA125 results 12798" in relation to Jean. When Jean later visits Dr Kennedy for her results, Dr Kennedy reveals that Jean does have ovarian cancer and refers her back to the NHS, saying she can start chemotherapy in about two weeks. Jean's daughter, Stacey Fowler (Lacey Turner) asks Dr Kennedy a lot of questions and Jean thanks Dr Kennedy as she leaves.
Sally	12 March	Cally Lawrence	A receptionist at the private clinic where Jean Slater (Gillian Wright) is due to get her cancer test results. While Jean's daughter, Stacey Fowler (Lacey Turner), and Stacey's husband, Martin Fowler (James Bye), wait in reception for Jean to turn up, Martin talks to Sally, asking her not to give Jean's appointment away, lying that Jean is in the toilet. However, Jean does not turn up so Stacey tells Sally to give the appointment to someone else.
Colin	14 March	Toby Williams	A man who delivers a gazebo to Jean Slater (Gillian Wright) at the caravan park where she is staying, however, Jean's daughter, Stacey Fowler (Lacey Turner), and Stacey's husband, Martin Fowler (James Bye) convince Colin to let Stacey's daughter, Lily Fowler (Aine Garvey) to hide in the gazebo box to gain entry to Jean's flat. Colin then delivers the box with Lily inside to Jean's caravan.
Judy	14 March	Leoni Kibbey	A woman who attends an addiction support group run by Rory (Ben Rufus Green) and talks about her experience.
Laura	18 March – 5 April (6 episodes)	Elinor Lawless	Ruby Allen's (Louisa Lytton) ISVA, who meets Ruby at her flat to discuss her upcoming court case. Ruby worries that the jury will believe Ross Swinden (Ossian Luke) and Matt Clarkson (Mitchell Hunt), her rapists, over her, and the jury may discover she is the daughter of a gangster, Johnny Allen (Billy Murray), but Laura assures her that the jury must reach a verdict based only on what they hear in court. The next day, Laura leaves Ruby a voicemail checking that she is okay. Laura meets Ruby on the day of her trial and tells her what will happen.
Sandra	26 March	Uncredited	Sandra is a friend of Kim Fox-Hubbard's (Tameka Empson) and Simone is a mobile hairdresser. Sandra sits for Simone when Kim and her sister, Denise Fox (Diane Parish), want to set up a salon business. Kim tells Simone not to touch Sandra's hair because she did not talk to her first and Kim does not like Simone's hairstyle, saying Sandra would not want it for herself. Denise apologises to Simone but Kim asks her to leave. Chantelle Atkins (Jessica Plummer) then arrives and styles Sandra's hair. Kim then asks Sandra to collect her daughter, Pearl Fox-Hubbard, from nursery.
Simone	26 March	Uncredited	
Gareth Woodington	1–5 April (4 episodes)	Timothy Bentinck	The prosecution barrister in the rape trial of Ross Swinden (Ossian Luke) and Matt Clarkson (Mitchell Hunt), who meets the victim, Ruby Allen (Louisa Lytton), before the trial and tells her that he will present her case and urges her to speak honestly. He is then present at the trial where he questions Ruby.
Sister Hallett	1–30 April (4 episodes)	Sarah Quist	A nurse who Jean Slater (Gillian Wright) sees for tests before she can start chemotherapy. Hallett tells Jean that the chemotherapy will be tailored based on her weight and blood tests. Jean asks her questions about the chemotherapy in relation to her bipolar medication but Hallett tells her to speak to her mental health nurse.
Sarah Jones	1–5 April (4 episodes)	Clara Indrani	The defence barrister who represents Ross Swinden (Ossian Luke) and Matt Clarkson (Mitchell Hunt) who are charged with the rape of Ruby Allen (Louisa Lytton.
Judge Davies	1–5 April (4 episodes)	Robert Benfield	The judge who is overseeing the case of Ross Swinden (Ossian Luke) and Matt Clarkson (Mitchell Hunt), who are charged with the rape of Ruby Allen (Louisa Lytton.
Mr Garrity	2 April	Ashley Russell	The headteacher of the school into which Honey Mitchell (Emma Barton) is trying to get her son, Will Mitchell (Freddie Phillips). Mr Garrity meets Honey, Will and Will's father, Billy Mitchell (Perry Fenwick). Mr Garrity says that only the brightest students will be admitted to the school, so Billy accuses him of implying that Will is not bright and of looking down his nose at the family, telling Mr Garrity that Will would be an asset to the school. Honey apologises to Mr Garrity and they leave.
Alex	4 April	Jeremy Ang Jones	A climbing instructor at The O2 Arena, who helps Jean Slater (Gillian Wright) to climb it.
Ruth	4 April	Natalie Lester	A woman who Jean Slater (Gillian Wright) meets, when she is attempting to climb The O2 Arena. Ruth tells Jean that she is raising money for charity as a friend of hers died recently of breast cancer. This upsets Jean, as she is battling cancer herself.
Daniel Reynolds	8 April	Paul Ansdell	A solicitor who tells Mel Owen (Tamzin Outhwaite) that her son, Hunter Owen (Charlie Winter), will not get bail after being arrested for murder. He recommends that Mel asks Hunter's friends to visit him in prison as it will look better for his case. At Hunter's plea hearing, Hunter pleads guilty so Daniel asks to confer with Hunter.
DC Jenny Rowell	8 April	Violet Patton-Ryder	A police officer who interviews Tiffany Butcher (Maisie Smith) about her involvement with Evie Steele (Sophia Capasso) and the gang of which she is a member.
Ewan	16 April – 20 May (2 episodes)	Riley Jones	The fiancé of Lola Pearce (Danielle Harold). He arrives in Walford when he wants Lola to come back to Newcastle. Ben Mitchell (Max Bowden) warns him off and threatens to kill him and his foster mother. Ewan later sends Lola and Ben's daughter, Lexi Pearce (Isabella Brown), a birthday present, but Ben does not tell Lola who it is from.
Ellie	18 April	Barbara Smith	A student from Stratford who Bex Fowler (Jasmine Armfield) meets when she is attending an Oxford University open day. Ellie tells Bex that she gets through her revision by taking her brother's ADHD medication, prompting Bex to buy some online for herself.
Sepp	25 April	Uncredited	The owner of a café in Walthamstow where Danny Hardcastle (Paul Usher), Phil Mitchell (Steve McFadden) and Keanu Taylor (Danny Walters) meet. Danny asks Sepp to close the café so they can have a meeting.
Tessa	26 April	Jo Jasani	A potential client for Ruby Allen (Louisa Lytton), with him she meets. Tessa started a business in Boxpark four years previously and now has two shops and wants more. Ruby gets angry when her assistant, Lola Pearce (Danielle Harold), starts talking about her daughter, Lexi Pearce (Isabella Brown) and Tessa shows Lola a picture of her son, Ryan. After the meeting, Lola tells Ruby that she was bonding as a way to gain the client but Ruby tells her not to agree with clients.
Brooke	29 April – 24 May (3 episodes)	Ria Lopez	A friend of Bernadette Taylor (Clair Norris). She is introduced as the older sister of Bailey Baker's (Kara-Leah Fernandes) friend, Alyssa. Brooke and Bernadette bond over their interest in the same band, and afterwards, Bernadette's friend, Tiffany Butcher (Maisie Smith) gets Brooke's phone number and gives it to Bernadette. Bernadette later messages Brooke, asking her on a date at Walford East, accompanied by Tiffany and Keegan Baker (Zack Morris). Brooke and Bernadette arrange to meet again. Brooke later breaks up with Bernadette, so Tiffany asks to meet her in McKlunky's. Upon Tiffany asking why she broke up with her, Brooke reveals that Bernadette is in love with Tiffany.
Mr Anderson	29 April	Jack Elliot Thomson	A teacher at Walford Primary School. When Amy Mitchell (Abbie Burke) goes missing, he tries to help her father, Jack Branning (Scott Maslen), to find her, but Jack shouts at Mr Anderson for allowing a 10-year-old girl to go missing. Mr Anderson then tells Jack that CCTV shows Amy talking to a man in a baseball cap.
Clive	30 April	James Ballanger	One of the labourers hired by Jack Branning (Scott Maslen) after one of Jack's flats floods. Clive discovers that the flood was caused by a dress being stuffed in sink in Ruby Allen's (Louisa Lytton) flat, above the flooded flat.
Allen	3 May	Dorian Simpson	Paramedics who treat Jean Slater (Gillian Wright) after cutting her leg on barbed wire.
Sarah	3 May	Lauryn Redding	Paramedics who treat Jean Slater (Gillian Wright) after cutting her leg on barbed wire.
Dr Arnold	10 May	Molly Gaisford	A doctor who treats Dinah Wilson's (Anjela Lauren Smith), when she has a fall. Dr Arnold recommend she returns to hospital for treatment but Dinah declines.
Deborah Jones	13 May	Nicola Blackman	A medical practitioner who Louise Mitchell (Tilly Keeper) sees when she is thinking about having a termination of her and Keanu Taylor's (Danny Walters) baby.
Marc	14–16 May (2 episodes)	Joe Da Costa	A man who supplies fruit to Martin Fowler (James Bye) for his fruit and veg market stall. Martin's wife, Stacey Fowler (Lacey Turner), decides to set Marc up on a date with her cousin, Kat Slater (Jessie Wallace), after asking if he is single and shows him a photo of her. Stacey sets up the date and Kat agrees to it. On their date, Marc is embarrassed by Kat's fruit-related innuendos and later he talks about the differences between certain citrus fruits, which Kat says is boring. Kat says it is lovely meeting him but she is not ready to date someone yet, so Marc leaves.
Darren	14 May	Kris Saunders	A man who with multiple sclerosis who Karen Taylor (Lorraine Stanley) reaches out to speak to Dinah Wilson (Anjela Lauren Smith) about not letting her illness get her down. Darren tells Karen that he used to be depressed but now he enjoys his life and agrees to speak to Dinah the following week.
Dr Cosslett	16 May	Hywel Simons	A doctor who gives Callum Highway (Tony Clay) a medical examination to assess if he is fit to return to the army. Cosslett says that Halfway's wound has fully healed and he may be able to return. Halfway then says he gets shooting pains in his leg, which Cosslett says could be neuropathic pain. Halfway says sometimes it stops him in his tracks, and when he gets home, he tells Whitney Dean (Shona McGarty) that he is not able to return to the army.
Mrs Coombes	20 May	Joanna Wake	A woman who is seen by Callum Highway (Tony Clay) outside Coker and Mitchell funeral directors. The building is locked and Halfway tells her that Jay Brown (Jamie Borthwick) is not there and should not be long. She explains that she is bringing a suit for her husband, Sid, to be buried in, saying that it is the suit he wore when they got married 54 years previously. Halfway takes her for a cup of tea in the café. Mrs Coombes tells him that Sid was hit by a car and in the hospital, doctors found a tumour. Halfway explains to Mrs Coombes that her pain will always be with her but she can still live a fulfilled life. Jay is thrilled when she later upgrades to his "platinum" package and he gives Halfway a job at the funeral directors.
Donny Ward	21–22 May (2 episodes)	Darcy Vanhinsbergh	A man who Ben Mitchell (Max Bowden) meets and pays him to kill Billy Mitchell (Perry Fenwick), saying he wants it to be a "tragedy". Ben calls him sexy before they part ways. The next day, Donny gets on a motorbike and prepares to shoot Billy outside Walford East tube station but when Ben realises that Billy is with his son, Will Mitchell (Freddie Phillips), Ben shouts to Billy and Donny is unable to shoot, but instead he rides past and knocks Billy and Will over, causing a head injury to Will and Ben to hurt his shoulder.
Vaiva	30 May	Uncredited	A customer of Fox & Hair.
Stanley	3 June	Charles David Anderson	An elderly couple who speak to Callum "Highway (Tony Clay) at the funeral directors to arrange their own funerals, saying they want to do it while still of sound mind.
Doreen	3 June	Pamela Lyne	An elderly couple who speak to Callum "Highway (Tony Clay) at the funeral directors to arrange their own funerals, saying they want to do it while still of sound mind.
Mrs Napier	4 June	Uncredited	A customer of Fox & Hair.
Terry	4–6 June (3 episodes)	Lee MacDonald	A bus driver who also entered the same phone in competition as Mick Carter (Danny Dyer) to win the Spice Girls tickets. Mick loses and tracks Terry down via his bus route to try and pay for the tickets but Terry declines. Later Terry turns up in The Queen Victoria public house and gives the tickets to Mick as he discovered that his wife does not like the Spice Girls.
Tristan	6 June	Matthew Baldwin	A friend of Adam Bateman's (Stephen Rahman-Hughes), who meets with Adam and Honey Mitchell (Emma Barton) to try and get Will Mitchell (Freddie Phillips) a school placement.
Mike	11 June	Tibu Fortes	A family counsellor who Sharon Mitchell (Letitia Dean), Phil Mitchell (Steve McFadden) and Dennis Rickman (Bleu Landau) visit to try to resolve Dennis's behaviour problems.
Valerie	17 June	Annie Aldington	A wedding shop owner who lets Tiffany Butcher (Maisie Smith) try on bridesmaid dresses for Whitney Dean (Shona McGarty) and Callum "Halfway" Highway (Tony Clay) wedding.
Nurse Hector	25 June – 6 December (2 episodes)	Joe Leat	A nurse who collects Alannah for her appointment.
Stevie	1–9 July (2 episodes)	Tom Dunne	A journalist who is reviewing the new local gay bar, The Prince Albert. He speaks to the manager, Tina Carter (Luisa Bradshaw-White), and she asks Gray Atkins (Toby-Alexander Smith) and Mick Carter (Danny Dyer) to pretend to be regular customers, especially Gray as Tina believes that Stevie is attracted to him. Gray and Mick praise the bar to Stevie but when Stevie invites Gray to another bar he is reviewing, Gray pretends that Mick is his partner and declines. He is later heard when he leaves Chantelle Atkins (Jessica Plummer) a voicemail saying he can write an article about the Walford 10K race.
Caren	5 July – 2 August (6 episodes)	Amy Robbins	A woman who Karen Taylor (Lorraine Stanley) kisses during Walford LGBT Pride. Two weeks later she returns to The Prince Albert bar where she and Karen have a drink. Caren tells Karen that she is a tailor by trade and has her own fashion line.
Dee Forestation	5 July – 2 October 2020 (2 episodes)	Crystal Rasmussen	A drag queen who performs at Walford LGBT Pride (credited as drag artist). In 2020, they host a bingo night at The Prince Albert bar.
Saleem Shah	8 July	Irfan Damani	Saleem is a man who is set up as a rishta or potential husband for Habiba Ahmed (Rukku Nahar) by Adam Bateman (Stephen Rahman-Hughes) and Saleem's mother Yalina. Habiba and Saleem speak in private and he accuses her of trying to put him off by talking about makeup. She tells him she is not looking for a relationship and he says he is not either as he is seeing someone from work, a woman who is leaving her husband to be with him. Habiba asks how he convinced her to leave her husband but he says he did not need to ask her because they are right for each other. Saleem reveals that he DJs in a nightclub, Dark, which Habiba loves, and he offers to put her on the guest list. Saleem says he will tell their families that he was the one not interested, but when tehey return, Yalina is arguing with Habiba's grandmother, Mariam Ahmed (Indira Joshi), about the quality of Mariam's China. Yalina deems the family unsuitable and she and Saleem then leave.
Yalina Shah	8 July	Siddiqua Akhtar	
Imran Qureshi	11 July	Reda Elazouar	A friend of Bobby Beale's (Clay Milner Russell) that he met in prison, when Bobby is released he meets Bobby a few weeks later in Walford Park. Imran gives Bobby a present, which later turns out to be a copy of the Quran and a prayer mat. He later stays at 45 Albert Square with Bobby as he is wanted by the police but Kathy Beale (Gillian Taylforth) calls the police and he is arrested.
Harry	11 July	Mace Richards	A photographer and a friend of Shirley Carter (Linda Henry), she hires him to take a photo of the 10K winners for the Walford Gazette. When Mick Carter (Danny Dyer) wants Ollie Carter (Harry Farr) in the picture with them Ollie starts banging things. Harry the references that his step-son also has autism.
Scott	15–16 July (2 episodes)	Robert Grose	A hotel manager where Rainie Branning (Tanya Franks) is staying at under the alise Mrs Devere. He allows her to stay an extra day but later see her running without paying her bill, during a fire alarm she set off.
Marcel	15–16 July (2 episodes)	Uncredited	A porter for the hotel that Rainie Branning (Tanya Franks) is staying at. He helps her with her luggage to her room door. He is then seen on the stairs as a fire warden, when Rainie sets off the fire alarm.
Michael	15 July	Sam O'Mahony	A scam artist who steals a large amount of money from Rainie Branning (Tanya Franks).
Beth	19 July	Sophie Spreadbury	A nurse who visits Sharon Mitchell (Letitia Dean) to take her blood and measure her blood pressure.
Beryl	19 July	Stephanie Fayerman	A passerby who drops her shopping whilst Stuart Highway (Ricky Champ) is keep a lookout to see if Rainie Branning (Tanya Franks) needs any help as she scamming men out of money by him scaring them away. He helps Beryl with her shopping and then hears Rainie screaming.
Nick	19 July	Keir Brown	A man who pays Rainie Branning (Tanya Franks) for sex but she tries to scam him by taking the money but not having sex with him. Nick slap her, she falls and then Nick repeatedly kicks her until Stuart Highway (Ricky Champ) comes and punches him. Nick says to Stuart "The tart had my money".
Sian	25–26 July (2 episodes)	Rhianna Hosmer	A friend of Louise Mitchell (Tilly Keeper) who invites her out. Louise tells her she is pregnant and Sain replies that she never thought she would be a pramface. Later Mel Owen (Tamzin Outhwaite) speaks to Sian and tells her Louise does not want to be friends with her anymore and that it's creepy that she keeps texting Louise that she misses her.
Toby	25 July	Uncredited	
DCI Morgan	1–8 August (5 episodes)	Hannah Daniel	A police officer who is investigating the assault on Phil Mitchell (Steve McFadden). She is aware of Phil's past and speaks to Phil's son, Ben Mitchell (Max Bowden), who says he saw Keanu Taylor (Danny Walters) fleeing the scene. Morgan later visits the hospital to take statements from Ben and Keanu. She later speaks to Martin Fowler (James Bye), who lies that he knows nothing about the assault. Morgan later questions Ben again and also to Kush Kazemi (Davood Ghadami) about Keanu's alibi, though his girlfriend, Kat Slater (Jessie Wallace), who witness the attack, makes Keanu change his story. Morgan then arrests Keanu for the attack and interviews him. She finally visits Phil is hospital when he regains consciousness but he says he does not know who attacked him. When she goes to speak to Keanu again, Keanu is in hiding and his girlfriend, Louise Mitchell (Tilly Keeper) thinks he is being arrested again, so Keanu and Louise go on the run.
Alex	2 August	Vic Zander	The mediator of an addict support group that Stuart Highway (Ricky Champ) takes RainieBranning (Tanya Franks) to when she thinks she is going on a date.
Dr Sisman	2 August	Sam Jones	A doctor treating Phil Mitchell (Steve McFadden) after Stacey Fowler (Lacey Turner) hits him over the head with a spanner.
DC Wallace	5–6 August (2 episodes)	Uncredited	A police officer assisting DCI Morgan, who is investigating an assault on Phil Mitchell (Steve McFadden).
Dom Bradshaw	8 August – 16 January 2020 (2 episodes)	Charlie	A friend of Janet Mitchell (Grace) who is first seen when Adam Bateman (Stephen Rahman-Hughes) stages them a pretend wedding that Janet's father, Billy Mitchell (Perry Fenwick), is not happy about. In January 2020, Dom joins Janet, her brother Will Mitchell (Freddie Phillips), and their mother, Honey Mitchell (Emma Barton), for a meal at Walford East restaurant.
Dr Hammond	9 August	Christopher Ashman	A doctor looking after Phil Mitchell (Steve McFadden) in Walford General Hospital after he was assaulted by Stacey Fowler (Lacey Turner.
Julian	9 August	Tim Charles	A customer in Walford East restaurant, when Iqra Ahmed (Priya Davdra) is having trouble with the bank card machine. Because of this, he refuses to pay and attempts to leave. Bobby Beale (Clay Milner Russell) steps in and tells him to apologise and pay. Julian does so and leaves.
Alex	9 August	Lenny Sherman	A man at the five-a-side football match that Mick Carter (Danny Dyer) is refereeing. When Alex does not agree with one of Mick's decisions, he attempts to cause trouble. Mitch Baker (Roger Griffiths) and Megan (Shauna McLean) step in to defend Mick, who then collapses from a panic attack.
Vicky	12–13 August (2 episodes)	Isis Davis	The sister of Chris Kennedy, a soldier who was in the army with Callum Highway (Tony Clay). She finds Callum and informs him that Chris died six months previously, on Valentine's Day. She tells him that Chris was in love with a man in the Army that he referred to only as "H". Callum says he did not know that Chris was gay and says he will try to think who "H" could be. She invites him to the funeral the next day. Callum attends the funeral, where Vicky asks him to speak but he declines. After the funeral, later reveals to Vicky that it was him that Chris was referring to as "H" and Vicky gives Callum Chris' letters.
Hue	13 August	Kyle Rowe	Fellow soldiers who served with Chris Kennedy and Callum Highway (Tony Clay) in the Army. They appear at Chris' funeral.
Suggsy	13 August	Uncredited	Fellow soldiers who served with Chris Kennedy and Callum Highway (Tony Clay) in the Army. They appear at Chris' funeral.
Liam	13 August	Uncredited	Fellow soldiers who served with Chris Kennedy and Callum Highway (Tony Clay) in the Army. They appear at Chris' funeral.
Benno	13 August	Uncredited	Fellow soldiers who served with Chris Kennedy and Callum Highway (Tony Clay) in the Army. They appear at Chris' funeral.
Dr Lyons	16 August	Natasha Alderslade	A doctor treating Mick Carter (Danny Dyer) after he collapses with chest pains. She tells him he did not have a heart attack but it was a panic attack. She asks if he has had any stresses in his life so he tells her everything that has happened over the last few years. She tells him to breathe into a paper bag the next time it happens.
Rollena	16 August	Uncredited	A customer of Fox & Hair.
Miss Caroline Gardner	20 August – 31 January 2020 (6 episodes)	Laura Stevely	A teacher at Walford Primary School. She is first seen visiting Ollie Carter (Harry Farr) at The Queen Victoria public house and later when Ollie attends Walford Primary School for the first time. Later, Caroline goes on a date with Mitch Baker (Roger Griffiths) at the pub so that Mick Carter (Danny Dyer) can talk her into giving Ollie a Learner of the Week award. However, when Caroline learns what Mick is up to, she reveals that her plan was to give Ollie the Learner of the Term award.
Shelley	20 August – 17 December (9 episodes)	Maria Louis	A woman who Shirley Carter (Linda Henry) punches in the mouth after she implies Ollie Carter (Harry Farr) is not normal as he hit her son.
DI Merritt	23–27 August (2 episodes)	Siobhan O'Kelly	A police officer investigating the escape of Hunter Owen (Charlie Winter) from Young Offenders prison.
Pixie	26 August	Sasha Clarke	Pixie and Finn work for an Organic Brewery Bar, "Z Bar", in Hackney. They talk to Ruby Allen (Louisa Lytton) and Max Branning's (Jake Wood) about raising the profile.
Finn	26 August	Matt Hunter	Pixie and Finn work for an Organic Brewery Bar, "Z Bar", in Hackney. They talk to Ruby Allen (Louisa Lytton) and Max Branning's (Jake Wood) about raising the profile.
Shyanna	26 August	Anita Harris	A psychic who Bailey Baker (Kara-Leah Fernandes) contacts to feel closer to her deceased mother, Dinah Wilson (Anjela Lauren Smith). Although Bailey's half-siblings, Chantelle Atkins (Jessica Plummer) and Keegan Baker (Zack Morris), tell Bailey that psychics do not exist and it is a con, Bailey still wants to try. Shyanna explains that Dinah can only speak through her and says that Dinah is sorry for how she died and is free of her struggles. Shyanna says that Bailey has found a new family and spent a lot of time alone with Dinah before that. Bailey asks what Dinah's favourite colour was, to which Shyanna says blue. Bailey says Dinah hated the colour blue and says she made lucky guesses based on what she had found out about Bailey. Bailey says it was a waste of her time and leaves. Shyanna then asks Chantelle for payment and tells her that her home has a "vibe" that Chantelle cannot fight alone and if she does, things will get "very dark". Shyanna then leaves.
Sully the Sumo	29–30 August (2 episodes)	Neil Scott	A sumo wrestler who Stuart Highway (Ricky Champ) hires for Callum "Highway's (Tony Clay) stag party. Stuart tells him that Callum is skinny and wearing a white shirt but Sully mistakenly grabs Robbie Jackson (Dean Gaffney) and carries him off.
DS Olivia Kowalski	6 September	Emma Stansfield	A police officer who tries to negotiate with Hunter Owen (Charlie Winter) to let everyone he takes hostage in The Queen Victoria public house go free.
DS Hugo Banner	9–13 September (2 episodes)	Sam Bond	A family liaison officer for Mel Owen (Tamzin Outhwaite), after her son Hunter Owen (Charlie Winter) is shot by armed police. He asks if Hunter contacted her before escaping prison but she does not answer so he terminates their interview. He then accompanies Mel to formally identify Hunter's body and says there will be an investigation by the Police Professional Standards Department. The character is credited as DS Banner but on his Police ID card his name is shown as Hugo Banner.
Pex Grimes	9–13 September (2 episodes)	Dwayne Nosworthy	The judge of the hairdressing competition. He visits Chantelle Atkins (Jessica Plummer) at the salon where she works to assess her. He puts her through to the final. Chantelle kisses Pex on the cheek to thank him. where she competes against Michael.
Michael	13 September	Uncredited	A hairdresser who is Chantelle Atkins' (Jessica Plummer) opponent during the finals of the hairdressing competition. He has a large following on Instagram.
Mieko Yoshi	16 September – 17 December (9 episodes)	Ami Okumura Jones	A mother whose daughter is attending Walford Primary School with Ollie Carter (Harry Farr). Linda Carter (Kellie Bright) asks her if she wants a playdate for both of them but she makes excuses that her daughter's tired. Later Linda asks her again but find out she has set up a playdate with another parent.
Phil Holden	16 September	Lee Comley	A journalist form the Walford Gazette who turns up to for a surprise interview with Bex Fowler (Jasmine Armfield) after she is nominated for a Pride of Walford Award by Louise Mitchell (Tilly Keeper). Bex turns his away and tell him that her mother Sonia Fowler (Natalie Cassidy) is the real hero for saving Ben Mitchell (Max Bowden).
Sunita	17 September	Naomi Sparrow	A woman who meets Louise Mitchell (Tilly Keeper) in The Queen Victoria public house. Louise thinks she is giving Bex Fowler (Jasmine Armfield) a Pride of Walford Award but she tell Louise that this is only the first stage and the nomination needs to go to judges to decide.
Dr Okafor	20 September	Gerald Gyimah	A doctor who is treating Bobby Beale (Clay Milner Russell) after he attempted to commit suicide by jumping in front of a train.
Wanda Baptiste	23–27 September	Anni Domingo	The mother of Sheree Trueman (Suzette Llewellyn). Upon Wanda's arrival, Sheree arranges a date between her Ted Murray (Christopher Timothy). Wanda later announces that she has booked a ticket to go travelling for a year, and has a spare ticket, to which Ted agrees to accompany her. When the pair are gone, Sheree reveals that Wanda's ex-husband died under mysterious pretences, concerning Denise Fox (Diane Parish).
Jason	24 September	Sebastian Street	An associate of Ben Mitchell (Max Bowden) he delivers a package to Ben at The Arches and remarks about a car in a poster that Keanu Taylor (Danny Walters) is looking at. Jason tells Ben a client of his is looking for that car and Ben implies he know where her can get one for the right price.
Charlie "Tubbs" Savage	27 September – 24 December	Tayla Kovacevic-Ebong	associate of Ben Mitchell (Max Bowden) who is a loan shark who shared a cell with Ben when he was imprisoned for the murder of Heather Trott (Cheryl Fergison). When Ben sees Tubbs loaning Karen Taylor (Lorraine Stanley) money, Ben asks Tubbs to keep him informed as his sister, Louise Mitchell (Tilly Keeper), is engaged to Karen's eldest son, Keanu Taylor (Danny Walters). Tubbs, alongside Martin Fowler (James Bye), raid the house of a woman who owes money. Tubbs and Martin realize that they have been set up and Martin brutally attacks one of the men. Tubbs and Ben are arrested when Martin confesses to Jack Branning (Scott Maslen) that they have been operating in illegal activities. As revenge, Ben orders Tubbs and his gang to torment Martin and they dangle him over a railway bridge. When Ben's boyfriend Callum Highway (Tony Clay) decides to become a police officer, Ben quits organised crime, and hands over the business to Tubbs, who rehires Martin.
Dr Towne	30 September	Emma Handy	A doctor who discusses Daniel Cook's (Ade Edmondson) treatment plan, Jean Slater (Gillian Wright) attends the appointment with Daniel. He tells Dr Towne he does not want treatment and wants to make the most of the time he has left.
Scott	30 September	Seth Papworth	A man who Ben Mitchell (Max Bowden) kisses in front of Callum Highway's (Tony Clay) to put him of having a date with him. Scott later wants more but Ben says he's no longer interested in him.
DCI James Lawyler	1 October – 21 November (2 episodes)	Eke Chukwu	A police officer who was taught by Jack Branning (Scott Maslen) and used to make him coffee. When Jack re-joins the police force, Lawyler has now become a senior officer and Jack's boss. He jokingly tells Jack that he likes his coffee decaffeinated with a splash of almond milk. Lawyler is with Jack when Leo King (Tom Wells) is arrested.
Simon Pratt	3 October	Michael Mueller	An old friend of Daniel Cook's (Ade Edmondson), Simon fell out with Daniel when he kisses his girlfriend Beth. Jean Slater (Gillian Wright) tracks him down and sets up a meeting so Daniel can apologies but Daniel refused to do so and states she kissed him. After Daniel calls Beth a "minger", Simon tells Daniel that he and Beth got back together and are married.
Paramedic Andy	4 October	James Ford	A paramedic who attends 25 Albert Square when Sonia Fowler (Natalie Cassidy) is unable to wake her daughter Bex Fowler (Jasmine Armfield). She took a number of tablets, which resulted in an overdose.
Dana	7 October	Géhane Strehler	A woman who asks Bex Fowler (Jasmine Armfield) if she has been having suicidal thoughts for a while.
Caitlin	10 October	Zoe Matthews	A woman who visits Bex Fowler (Jasmine Armfield) to ask her is she has had any similar feelings to the ones she had when she took the tablets.
Mike	11 October	Edward Harrison	A neighbour of Daniel Cook's (Ade Edmondson), who calls Jean Slater (Gillian Wright) to tell her Daniel has died and that there is a memorial for Daniel at Walford Community Centre.
Harry Pike	11 October	Uncredited	An old friend of Daniel Cook's (Ade Edmondson). He attends Daniel's memorial and remarks to Mike that Daniel had sex with Harry's wife.
PC Grover	11 October; 8 March 2022 (2 episodes)	Donovan Imber	Initially credited only as "police officer". In 2022, he arrests Kheerat Panesar (Jaz Deol) after striking Gray Atkins (Toby-Alexander Smith) over the head with a glass bottle in self-defence.
Carly	17 October	Jessie Hills	A woman who Martin Fowler (James Bye) and Tubbs (Tayla Kovacevic-Ebong) visit to collect her debt. She pays Tubbs, who then uses her bathroom. While Tubbs is not there, Martin gives Carly some money because he has sympathy for her. When Tubbs returns, Carly's partner turns up with a friend and they fight with Martin and Tubbs. Martin beats her partner to the ground and then walks away.
Miss Rogers	21 October	Uncredited	A customer in Fox & Hair, who always likes it when Chantelle Atkins (Jessica Plummer) styles her hair.
Lena	24 October	Karolina Kriks	
Daisy	11–12 November (2 episodes)	Mary Doherty	A mother of a child who has autism who meets Mick Carter (Danny Dyer) when he takes his son, Ollie Carter (Harry Farr), for be assessed for autism. She offers to look after Ollie while Mick finds his wife, Linda Carter (Kellie Bright) and tells Mick that her partner did not take the news of their child's autism well. Daisy later tells Linda that both her son and daughter have autism.
Dr Fremantle	11–12 November (2 episodes)	Pui Fan Lee	A doctor who tells Mick Carter (Danny Dyer) and Linda Carter (Kellie Bright) that their son Ollie Carter (Harry Farr) has autism.
Roz	19 November – 2 December (2 episodes)	Siwan Morris	A therapist who is seeing Gray Atkins (Toby-Alexander Smith) to help with his anger management. Gray's wife, Chantelle Atkins (Jessica Plummer) attends one of their sessions. Gray says that he takes home the stresses of his job and says he needs to learn to control his outbursts. Roz asks if Gray is ever violent so he mentions a time he beat up a man in a bar but says he has never hurt Chantelle, though it is a lie. Roz later visits Gray and Chantelle at their home where Gray admits to taking his anger out on Chantelle and talks about his abusive father. When Roz asks what Gray meant when he said he takes his anger out on Chantelle, Chantelle ends the session. Roz suggests that they attend separate sessions.
PC Rothman	21 November	Nathan Wright	A police officer who stops Keegan Baker (Zack Morris) as he matches the description of a drug dealer, which Keegan responds to sarcastically, seemingly accusing the police of racism. Rothman searches Keegan in the street and finds £40 in notes on his person, which he asks his mother gave him, and people he knows see him being searched.
Jerome	22 November	Chris Charles	The new boyfriend of Stacey Fowler (Lacey Turner). Stacey's husband, Martin Fowler, first sees Jerome when Stacey's mother, Jean Slater (Gillian Wright), arranges Stacey's belongings for him to collect.
PC Stein	25 November	Sherise Blackman	A police officer who attends the scene of a car crash outside a school. Shelley says Linda Carter (Kellie Bright) did it and Stein gives Linda a breathalyzer test and then arrests her for driving under the influence of alcohol because she is still over the legal limit from drinking the night before.
Edith Fletcher	25 November – 10 December (2 episodes)	Victoria Broom	An investor who Ian Beale (Adam Woodyatt) wants to convince to support his campaign to become a Walford Counsellor. Ian holds an event in his restaurant, which Edith attends, but when someone claims they sees a rat, Ian's campaign manager, Ruby Allen (Louisa Lytton), moves the event to The Queen Victoria public house, having heard that Edith drinks draught beer. Edith says this is the best beer she has ever had and speaks to Ruby about Ian. She then tells Ian that he has a good campaign, which is mostly down to Ruby and she hopes he is paying Ruby well. Ian later meets Edith and shows him the caps he has had made for his campaign but they contain a spelling error. Edith suggests that because Ruby's father, Johnny Allen (Billy Murray), was a notorious East End gangster, it may cause a problem for the campaign and says that Ruby should publicly denounce Johnny and Ian should vocally support her.
Candice	25 November	Uncredited	A customer of Fox & Hair salon.
Nurse Eve	3 December	Godiva Marshall	A nurse in a psychiatric hospital who Lisa Fowler (Lucy Benjamin) meets when she commits herself.
Eddie	5 December	Bradley Taylor	A criminal who tells Shirley Carter (Linda Henry) that Shaun does not want to do business with Phil Mitchell (Steve McFadden) anymore because Ben Mitchell (Max Bowden) is sleeping with a copper.
Alannah	6 December	Madeleine Macmahon	A woman who Jean Slater (Gillian Wright) meets at Walford General Hospital who is waiting for a cancer appointment.
Rose Bartley	9 December	Linda John-Pierre	An industry insider for Child Beauty Pageants. She meets Lexi Pearce (Isabella Brown) and Lexi asks her if she is the top stylist, to which Rose responds that she does not do wigs. Rose asks Lexi's mother Lola Pearce (Danielle Harold) if she has ever considered entering Lexi into pageants.
Nurse Zhang	9–12 December (3 episodes)	Minhee Yeo	A nurse who looks after Louise Mitchell (Tilly Keeper) during her labour of her daughter, Peggy Taylor.
Margaret	10 December	Eve Ferret	A woman who is visiting her mother's grave and offers Leo King (Tom Wells) weed clippers to cut down the weeds from his father, Tony King's (Chris Coghill), grave. He becomes annoyed when she says that people are busy and the dead are forgotten.
Mr Turney	16 December	John Faulkner	Two customers of Coker & Mitchell funeral directors. Mr Turney says he wants the clothes that his wife is wearing back despite Stuart Highway (Ricky Champ) saying that she will be buried naked. Mrs Hobson asks for her husband, Ronald, to be cremated with their wedding photo but says he was scared for fire. Stuart later realises that Mrs Turney has been sent to the crematorium and Ronald has been sent to the cemetery so he and his girlfriend, Rainie Branning (Tanya Franks), rush to the two places to fix the problem.
Mrs Hobson	16 December	Priscilla Gray	
Cara	17 December	Christina Balmer	An estate agent who meets Kheerat Panesar (Jaz Deol), Vinny Panesar (Shiv Jalota) and Jags Panesar (Amar Adatia) to show them to their new house on Albert Square. They enter the house where Kat Slater (Jessie Wallace), Mo Harris (Laila Morse), Jean Slater (Gillian Wright) and Kush Kazemi (Davood Ghadami) live with and Cara says the Panesars are the new owners of the house, having bought it from Janine Butcher (Charlie Brooks). Kat says they knew nothing about it but then realises that Mo was hiding the letters. Kheerat gives them until New Year's Day to vacate.
George Watson	23 December − 17 January 2020 (6 episodes)	Jack Bennett	A man who is hit by Martin Fowler's (James Bye) van, which is being driven by Charlie "Tubbs" Savage (Tayla Kovacevic-Ebong) with Martin as a passenger. Martin gets out of the van to check on the man but Tubbs orders him back. After Martin tells Sonia Fowler (Natalie Cassidy), a nurse and Martin's partner, that he thinks he has killed someone in a hit and run, she tells him that a man was taken to hospital so they go to see George and see that he is in a coma. When George awakens, Sonia visits him in hospital to question him about the hit-and-run; he recalls the name Martin being involved. Sonia visits again after the police question George, who reveals that he has spoken to other nurses about Sonia and knows that she is in a relationship with Martin. He blackmails Sonia and demands £10,000 in return for him not informing the police. Sonia presents him with £2,000, but he insists it is not enough and threatens to go to the police. Sonia steals from her elderly step-grandmother Dot Branning (June Brown) to pay George, and gives him the money, so he promises not to report Martin.
Matthew	31 December	Ross Forder	A man in The Prince Albert bar who dares a drunk Linda Carter (Kellie Bright) to pole dance. After the bar closes, he gets a taxi and takes Linda to a hotel where he kisses her neck but she goes to the bathroom to vomit. He then tries to have sex with her but she tells him not to kiss her and says she is married. She then overpowers him and leaves.
