= Karen Taylor (EastEnders) =

Fictional character from EastEnders

- EastEnders character
- Portrayed by: Lorraine Stanley
- Duration: 2017–2024, 2026
- First appearance: Episode 5511; 15 June 2017
- Last appearance: Episode 6926; 22 June 2026 (voice only)
- Created by: Daran Little
- Introduced by: Sean O'Connor (2017); Chris Clenshaw (2024); Ben Wadey (2026)
- Spin-off appearances: The Queen Vic Quiz Night (2020)
In-universe information
- Occupation: Cleaner; Laundrette assistant
- Mother: Hazel Taylor
- Sisters: Kandice Taylor
- Sons: Keanu Taylor; Keegan Baker; Riley Taylor; Chatham Taylor
- Daughters: Chantelle Atkins; Bernadette Taylor
- Grandsons: Mackenzie Atkins; Roland Highway
- Granddaughters: Mia Atkins; Belle Taylor; Peggy Taylor
- Nieces: Princess
- First cousins: Maggie Taylor

Karen Taylor is a fictional character in the BBC soap opera EastEnders, played by Lorraine Stanley. She was introduced in episode 5511, broadcast on 15 June 2017, as the matriarch of the Taylor family. She arrived alongside her children Keanu Taylor (Danny Walters), Keegan Baker (Zack Morris), Bernadette (Clair Norris), Riley (Tom Jacobs), and Chatham Taylor (Alfie Jacobs), and is later revealed to be the mother of then off-screen character Chantelle Atkins (Jessica Plummer). She is described as loud and fierce, yet kind-hearted and loyal. In her time on the show, her storylines focused on her financial struggles and her dedication to her family, family bereavements, exploring her sexuality, feuds with several characters including Phil Mitchell (Steve McFadden) and Sharon Watts (Letitia Dean), and relationships with Billy Mitchell (Perry Fenwick) and Mitch Baker (Roger Griffiths)

This was the third role Stanley had portrayed on EastEnders, having played Mo Harris in the 2004 spin-off special EastEnders: Pat & Mo and pub landlady Thelma Bragg in 2016. Stanley's portrayal of Karen has received a positive response from audience and critics, with Stanley winning Best Newcomer at The British Soap Awards in 2018. In July 2023, it was announced that Stanley had been let go from the soap by executive producer Chris Clenshaw, with her departure being broadcast in episode 6816, which aired on 8 December 2023. Karen then made brief returns in the episodes broadcast on 25 December 2023, 5 and 8 February 2024, and on 13 and 17 June 2024. Karen returned via a telephone call on 22 June 2026.

== Development ==
=== Introduction and characterisation ===
Karen and the Taylors were created by writer Daran Little, and their arrival was announced in May 2017. They were introduced as a "noisy" family which would have "explosive" storylines that would make "quite an entrance". Executive producer Sean O'Connor was excited to introduce the family, describing them as "noisy, brash and not to be messed with". He described Karen in particular as a "twenty-a-day lioness, bringing up her kids with no support, no money and a very loud mouth", although noted that while she comes across as a "fierce woman who won't hear a bad word said about her family", those close to her learn that she can also be "kind-hearted and loyal". Stanley later went on to admit that the idea for their introduction was to make them seem like nightmarish neighbours, and for viewers to warm up to them later, commenting that "Karen would do anything for her family" and suggesting that she was the show's best mother. When talking about joining EastEnders, Stanley commented: "I'm chuffed to be cast in such an iconic show that I've grown up watching. Working with my new family is really quite special, and I'm proud to play their mum".

"I think she's a friendly, loving person, but she's got a mouth on her and if people don't like her, then they don't like her. But she's a people person and she really tries to get to know her neighbours. She stands outside her door, having a fag and comments on what's going on. Introducing herself to all the people that pass by, so I think she's friendly and outgoing, but whether people like her or not is a different matter!"

— Lorraine Stanley, portrayer of Karen, discussing her character.

Karen is the third role Stanley has portrayed on EastEnders, as she portrayed a younger Mo Harris in the 2004 spin-off EastEnders: Pat and Mo and pub landlady Thelma Bragg in 2016. Despite initial doubts, Stanley believed her previous time on EastEnders helped her gain the role of Karen, as she had formed a friendship with casting director Julia Crampsie. She was called in to audition for Karen after success playing Thelma, and was given brief details on the character, but knew she would be the head of a new family. Stanley described the auditioning process positively, saying "I had a really good audition and I love the show's casting director, Julia Crampsie, because she's always had my back". On her casting, Stanley said "I thought it would be weird for me to play another character, but the character was perfect for me". Emma Barton was a mentor for Stanley on-set. When asked about Karen's type in men, Stanley responded that her character "likes a bad boy".

Stanley explained that a backstory for the Taylor family is that they lived on an estate that was being knocked down, so moved into social housing in Albert Square. Karen, alongside her children Keanu (Danny Walters), Bernadette (Clair Norris), Riley (Tom Jacobs) and Chatham (Alfie Jacobs) made their first appearances on 15 June 2017.

=== Departure ===
In July 2023, a decision to axe Karen was reached by producers, as they decided the character had reached the end of the road. A source told The Sun: "It's always a tough call for bosses when deciding which characters will leave the soap, but it has to be done to keep storylines fresh and create new arcs for characters. Lorraine had a great run on the soap and was a real scene stealer with her comic timing and she has certainly made her mark with fans". She was set to depart in dramatic fashion in late 2023.

When talking about Karen's departure, Chris Clenshaw said "You know, we're currently staying quite tight-lipped on the exact circumstances leading to Karen's exit. The Taylors have been a fantastic addition to the show since their introduction, which I think was about six years ago now, but what I can say is that, yeah, Karen's exit will be full of drama, in true EastEnders fashion, and yeah, there will be some twists and turns that I don't think viewers will expect". When talking about her departure, Stanley said "Thank you to [writer] Daran Little for creating the Taylors and to the BBC for giving me the opportunity to play such a fabulous character". Karen left the show alongside Mitch Baker (Roger Griffiths), Bailey Baker (Kara-Leah Fernandes), Mia Atkins (Mahalia Malcolm) and Mackenzie Atkins (Isaac Lemonius), of these characters, Karen's exit was the only one that was announced beforehand.

=== Guest stints ===
Stanley, along with Griffiths, made a brief unannounced return as Karen on 25 December 2023. In January 2024, it was announced that Karen would briefly return to the show after Keanu's death, only a few weeks after her exit, returning in February 2024. Details later included Karen attempting to solve where Keanu had disappeared to and aggressively interrogating the locals. In April 2024 it was announced that Stanley would return for another guest stint after Keanu's body was uncovered. Stanley later made a brief unannounced return in 2026, where Karen returns via phone call on 22 June 2026, warning Chelsea Fox (Zaraah Abrahams) to stay away from Gray's grandmother Sheila Atkins (Sheila Ruskin).

== Storylines ==
Karen arrives in Walford with her children Keanu (Danny Walters), Bernadette (Clair Norris) Riley (Tom Jacobs) and Chatham (Alfie Jacobs), joining her son Keegan Baker (Zack Morris). Karen introduces herself to some of the neighbours, who are appalled by the family's rowdy behaviour. The family move in above Ted (Christopher Timothy) and Joyce Murray (Maggie Steed), who are especially unhappy to discover the Taylors are living above them, as Karen caused their friend to suffer a nervous breakdown when they were previously neighbours in Walford Towers. Denise Fox (Diane Parish) tries to make peace with Karen over her altercation with Keegan a few months previously, but Karen threatens violence against her if it happens again.

Bernadette complains of being ill and is revealed to be pregnant. Karen pleads with Dr. Natasha Black (Rachel Bavidge) not to inform social services, and tells Bernadette that keeping the baby is her own choice, but worries about how the family will afford to raise another child. Keanu later finds out that the father is in Bernadette's year at school, to Karen's relief. Bernadette goes onto suffer a miscarriage after being caught in a gas explosion, to the devastation of herself, Karen, and Keanu. At a memorial speaking for the baby, its father Callum (Shaun Aylward) arrives and reveals they would have named the baby Belle. When Riley and Chatham return home, they ask questions about the baby, and Shirley Carter (Linda Henry) comforts Karen when she breaks down.

Karen's financial struggles prevail, so, desperate for cash, decides to pawn a wedding ring that she has kept. Keanu tries to convince her not to, as it had belonged to his grandmother. The Taylors' belongings are removed by bailiffs due to Karen failing to repay loans, but they can get them back the next day if they can raise £1000, so Karen and Bernadette go to visit Karen's sister, Kandice Taylor (Hannah Spearritt). Kandice agrees to loan them the money, but when Karen begins arguing with her, Kandice changes her mind. Bernadette meets up with Kandice and emotionally pleads with Kandice to help, but she apologetically refuses to and when the bailiffs are due to visit, Kandice turns up with the money. After bickering again and Karen throwing the money back, Karen and Kandice make up.

In 2018, Karen's ex-boyfriend and the father of Keegan, Mitch Baker (Roger Griffiths), arrives on Albert Square, and he is warned away from the family by Keanu, but he later returns and he shouts for Karen and Keegan at the flat, but Keanu punches him. Mitch flirts with Karen at the launderette whilst she is working and when Karen brings Mitch home, Keegan, Keanu and Bernadette do not want Mitch's presence, but Karen later sneaks him into the flat. Keanu is disgusted with Karen for letting Mitch stay the night and Mitch brings up Keanu's father. Karen attempts to reluctantly talk to Keanu about his father, but she fails and talks to Mitch about her being stabbed by Keanu's father in the past. Karen considers re-conciliating with Mitch, but she discovers that he has a pregnant girlfriend. Karen breaks up with Mitch and he leaves Walford.

Mitch returns to Walford with his daughter Bailey Baker (Kara-Leah Fernandes), wanting Bailey to live with the Taylors as her terminally ill mother, Dinah Wilson (Anjela Lauren Smith), is due to die from multiple sclerosis. Karen cannot let Bailey live with her due to little space, but agrees to help Bailey and her mother. However, she agrees to let Bailey live with her when Dinah dies. Louise's father, Phil Mitchell (Steve McFadden), sends Keanu to Spain to help him look after his business, but Karen worries after not speaking to Keanu for several weeks and blackmails Sharon Mitchell (Letitia Dean) to ask Phil to bring Keanu back to Walford, otherwise she will expose Keanu and Sharon's affair. Meanwhile, Keegan's drug addiction is exposed when he almost overdoses, and Karen calls the police on his supplier, Tiffany Butcher (Maisie Smith) but drops the charges when she discovers that Mitch knew about Keegan's addiction.

Karen and Mitch's daughter Chantelle Atkins (Jessica Plummer), joined by her husband Gray (Toby-Alexander Smith) and two children Mia (Mahalia Malcolm) and Mackenzie (Isaac Lemonius), arrives in Walford to work as a hairdresser. During celebratory drinks in The Queen Victoria public house, Chantelle bumps into Mitch, who she has not seen for a long time. Chantelle later meets Karen and reconnects with her family after moving into No. 1 Albert Square. After it transpires that Gray had been abusing Chantelle and murdered her in September 2020, Karen is distraught as she had only reconnected with her the year prior. She maintains an on-off relationship with Mitch during 2020 and 2021, and they often step in to look after Chantelle's children before they discover Gray was responsible for Chantelle's murder in March 2022, with Karen helping the police incarcerate him.

After a disagreement on the future of their son Albie Watts (Arthur Gentleman), Keanu kidnaps Albie from Sharon, but decides he cannot go through with it and calls Karen. Keanu tells Karen to hide Albie at her Kandice's house. Keanu claims to Sharon that Albie was abducted when he turned his back. In order to cover his tracks, Keanu posts a ransom note through Sharon's door demanding £50,000 in exchange for Albie to be returned. Phil lends Sharon the money for Albie, and Keanu convinces Sharon to arrange for Karen to drop off the ransom money to the false abductors, to which Sharon agrees. Karen then retrieves Albie. Two weeks later, Keanu tries to get the money from Karen but both are caught by Mitch and they admit to Albie's kidnap, leaving Mitch disgusted. When the scheme is exposed, Sharon slaps Karen and Phil vows revenge on the Taylors for taking his money. Karen then flees Walford for Spain in December 2023 with the money, Mitch, Bailey, Mia, and Mackenzie.

Karen returns in February 2024, claiming to have not heard from Keanu in months. She aggressively interrogates the residents for answers, to no avail, despite some acting suspiciously. She is convinced to leave by Bernadette. After hearing that Dean Wicks (Matt Di Angelo) had been arrested for Keanu's murder, Karen returns in June 2024 for Keanu's funeral. Karen is unaware that Keanu was in fact killed by Linda Carter (Kellie Bright) in defence of Sharon, with Kathy Cotton (Gillian Taylforth), Denise Fox (Diane Parish), Stacey Slater (Lacey Turner), Suki Panesar (Balvinder Sopal), and Sharon all assisting in covering up his murder.

== Reception ==
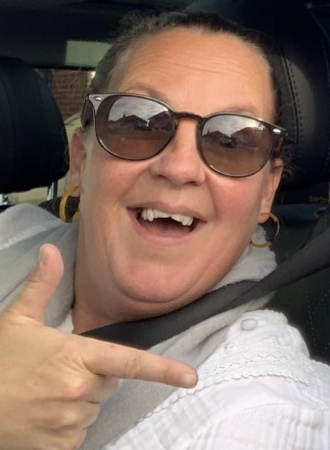
Lorraine Stanley (pictured) was nominated for six awards for her portrayal of Karen, winning two of them.

Stanley received the Best Newcomer award at the 2018 British Soap Awards for her portrayal of Karen. That year, she was also nominated at the Inside Soap Awards for Funniest Female. She earned her second Funniest Female nomination and was nominated in the Best Actress category at the 2019 Inside Soap Awards, winning the former. Stanley also received a Best Actress nomination at the British Soap Awards and Best Soap Actress nomination at the TV Choice Awards, both in 2019. In 2019, Gary Gillatt of Inside Soap labelled Karen's character a "bullseye", describing it as "wonderful" how Karen had become "the absolute heart of EastEnders" and "the axis about which the show revolves", adding that the show's creators Julia Smith and Tony Holland "would have approved". Gillatt later opined that "no one pulls focus on a scene like Karen Taylor". Daran Little said that, on her exit, Lorraine Stanley "put the flesh on her bones and made her brilliantly whole. Was very sad to write her exit but wow, does Lorraine deliver!! A five star heart wrenching performance". In 2023, Lewis Knight of Radio Times called the character a "staple" in Walford since her arrival. Following her character's exit, Stanley said she felt "overwhelmed" by positive messages from fans.
