= Chantelle Atkins =

Fictional character from EastEnders

- EastEnders character
- Portrayed by: Jessica Plummer
- Duration: 2019–2020
- First appearance: Episode 5891; 26 March 2019
- Last appearance: Episode 6134; 22 September 2020
- Introduced by: Kate Oates
In-universe information
- Occupation: Hairdresser; Call centre assistant
- Father: Mitch Baker
- Mother: Karen Taylor
- Brothers: Keegan Baker
- Half-brothers: Keanu Taylor; Riley Taylor; Chatham Taylor
- Half-sisters: Bernadette Taylor; Bailey Baker
- Husband: Gray Atkins (until 2020)
- Sons: Mackenzie Atkins
- Daughters: Mia Atkins
- Grandfathers: Tony Baker
- Grandmothers: Hazel Taylor
- Uncles: Avery Baker
- Aunts: Kandice Taylor
- Nieces: Peggy Taylor
- First cousins: Felix Baker

Chantelle Atkins is a fictional character from the BBC soap opera EastEnders, played by Jessica Plummer. She first appears in episode 5991, originally broadcast in the United Kingdom on 26 March 2019. Chantelle is introduced as the eldest daughter of Karen Taylor (Lorraine Stanley) and had been referenced on-screen since the family's arrival in 2017. The character was created with a family unit consisting of Chantelle, husband Gray Atkins (Toby-Alexander Smith) and two children Mia Atkins (Mahalia Malcolm) and Mackenzie Atkins (Isaac Lemonius). Chantelle is characterised as a loving and vivacious hairdresser with the same fiery attitude as her family. Her backstory states that after marrying Gray, she established a perfect life for herself away from her family. The character's early stories focus on her relationships with her parents, Karen and Mitch Baker (Roger Griffiths), and a feud with Kim Fox (Tameka Empson) after moving into her former home.

The characters of Chantelle and Gray were used to highlight the topic of domestic abuse. Producers wanted to explore the idea that "you don't know what goes on behind closed doors". To achieve this, the story was not announced prior to transmission and the first portrayed attack also marks the first time viewers see inside the family home. EastEnders worked with charities Refuge and Women's Aid throughout the plot. Writers developed the story over multiple months and explored the relationship, in private and public. They portrayed Chantelle being isolated from friends and family, falling pregnant and suffering a miscarriage, and developing a growing awareness of her situation.

The story concludes with Chantelle's death, a decision made to reflect real-life cases of domestic abuse. Plans for the character's exit were delayed by the show's three-month production break, but the story team used the break to explore the impact of the COVID-19 pandemic on domestic violence. Chantelle dies after challenging Gray and announcing her plans to leave. Plummer and Smith filmed the 15 minute-long scene in one take under strict filming restrictions. The character departs in episode 6134, originally broadcast on 22 September 2020. Plummer was proud of her work on the storyline and felt it was important to end it with Chantelle's death.

For her portrayal of Chantelle, Plummer was nominated for and won multiple awards. In 2020, she won the Best Actress award at the Inside Soap Awards and the Best Soap Female Actor accolade at the Digital Spy Reader Awards. The domestic abuse plot led to an increase in calls experienced by Women's Aid. The character and the domestic abuse story was praised by television critics and the audience alike. Claire Crick from What's on TV called Chantelle's death "some of the toughest scenes EastEnders has ever aired". Sophie Dainty of Digital Spy praised Plummer's "astonishing" portrayal of her character's "agonising and unforgettable final scenes".

== Creation and casting ==
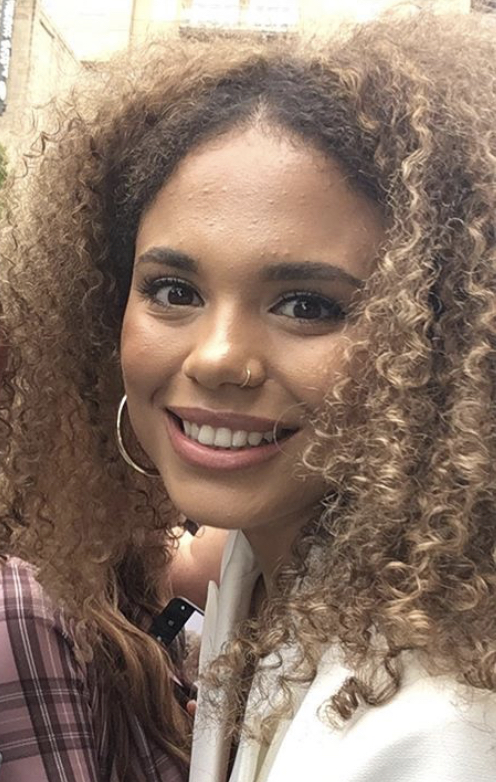
Jessica Plummer, who portrays Chantelle.

In 2017, the Taylor family – consisting of matriarch Karen Taylor (Lorraine Stanley) and her children, Keanu Taylor (Danny Walters), Keegan Baker (Zack Morris), Bernadette Taylor (Clair Norris), Riley Taylor (Tom Jacobs) and Chatham Taylor (Alfie Jacobs) – were created and introduced to EastEnders. The family, and the concept of Chantelle, were announced on 12 May 2017. Chantelle is Karen's eldest child and lives nearby with her boyfriend and two children. While most of the children have different fathers, Chantelle and Keegan share the same father, Mitch Baker (Roger Griffiths). Morris expressed an interest in introducing the character in a September 2017 interview with Inside Soap. Mitch was introduced to the series in March 2018.

The character was referenced on-screen on several occasions prior to her introduction. Laura Morgan, writing for entertainment website Digital Spy, did not believe the family had made an impact on the soap following their arrival and thought that introducing Chantelle and her family would help them achieve this. She believed that casting a capable actress would benefit the family and establish Chantelle as a "standout character", such as Kat Slater (Jessie Wallace) in the Slater family and Max Branning (Jake Wood) in the Branning family. Morgan noted that Chantelle could be portrayed as "a chip off the old block and as mouthy as her mum" or characterised in contrast to her family.

On 20 December 2018, it was confirmed that the character would be introduced to EastEnders in 2019 and that the role was in the process of being cast. Kate Oates, the show's senior executive producer, stated that Chantelle's arrival would "complete" the Taylor family and added, "Things are set to get a whole lot louder in Walford in 2019." Stanley was excited about Chantelle's introduction and wanted to explore the character as well as Chantelle and Karen's relationship. It was announced on 5 March 2019 that actress and singer Jessica Plummer had been cast as Chantelle, and further details about the character and Plummer's casting were announced on 11 March 2019.

When she joined the cast, Plummer was mentored by experienced cast member Tony Clay (who portrays Callum Highway). She felt fortunate to have Clay as her mentor and called her "a calming presence". The character was created with a family unit consisting of Chantelle, husband Gray Atkins (Toby-Alexander Smith) and two children Mia Atkins (Mahalia Malcolm) and Mackenzie Atkins (Isaac Lemonius). The actors began filming in early 2019. Oates expressed her excitement at the family's introduction and Plummer called it "an absolute honour" to join the cast. The family were previewed in promotional images featuring them with Karen and Mitch.

== Development ==
=== Characterisation ===
Chantelle is billed as "compassionate and bubbly" with the same "hair-trigger temper" as her mother. Although she appears "friendly [and] easygoing", she has underlying traits of a Taylor. Chantelle values family and is "devoted to her [children] and fiercely protective of her five siblings". Discussing her personality, Oates stated that Chantelle "certainly has that feisty Taylor streak". She added that the character is "tough, sharp and streetwise". Chantelle is trained as an experienced hairdresser.

The character's backstory states that she grew up in a "humble" setting, before meeting Gray who "swept [her] off her feet and whisked her away". Stanley told Daniel Kilkelly of Digital Spy that Chantelle has established her own life away from her family. A show spokesperson thought that Chantelle's absence from the Taylor family was "tough for Karen". Oates explained that Chantelle's backstory establishes her in the family as "the one who's 'done good'" by settling down in a marriage with Gray. She summarised that Chantelle has a "picture-perfect lifestyle", which places her in dispute with her family. Plummer initially felt pressure to join the established Taylor family as she wanted to portray Chantelle as "the long-lost sister".

=== Introduction and feud with Kim Fox ===
The character is introduced in episode 5891, originally broadcast in the United Kingdom on 26 March 2019. Chantelle joins the soap alongside her "successful" husband Gray, who is a solicitor, and their "lively" young children Mia and Mackenzie. On Chantelle and Gray's relationship, Plummer said that there is "drama" between the couple and Gray has the potential to become a villainous character. The actress enjoyed working with Smith, who she called a "sweetheart". Plummer and Smith appear together in most of their scenes, so she was pleased that she could befriend him. Smith was also delighted that they could establish "a really solid friendship". Karen and Mitch are delighted by Chantelle's arrival, although tension between Chantelle and her parents strain their relationship quickly. Mitch has been absent in the family's lives and has only recently returned prior to Chantelle's arrival. This concerns Chantelle, who becomes "immediately suspicious" about his reasons for returning. Off-screen, Plummer enjoyed filming with Griffiths and praised his acting techniques. On Chantelle and Karen's strained relationship, Stanley said that the friction stems from Chantelle leaving the family. The actress looked forward to seeing Chantelle's reaction to her family. Katie Baillie of the Metro wondered whether Chantelle would help Keegan with his struggles and how she would react to her new half-sister, Bailey Baker (Kara-Leah Fernandes).

Advanced spoilers of Chantelle's introduction were released on 16 March 2019, and the introduction was teased in a promotional trailer, released two days later. Chantelle first appears alone before the rest of her family debut. Prior to her arrival, Mitch and Denise Fox (Diane Parish) battle to open their own salon using funding from Patrick Trueman (Rudolph Walker). Patrick hires a salon for the day and instructs the pair to launch pop-up salons and see who is most successful. After hiring a stylist, Denise gloats to Mitch, but he is surprised to learn that she has hired Chantelle. As they compete, Denise and Chantelle perform poorly in comparison to Mitch. However, Gray soon arrives, pretending to be a customer who leaves a large tip for the team. Patrick decides to invest in both businesses, so Denise and Mitch set up the salon together. Denise wants to hire Chantelle full-time for the salon, but she cannot commit to that. Denise believes this is due to her estranged relationship with Mitch, so he persuades her to accept the full-time position. The first scenes that Plummer filmed were opposite Parish, Walker and Tameka Empson (who portrays Denise's sister, Kim Fox). She found this nerve-wracking as she had watched the actors on-screen while growing up. The actress did not watch her first scenes as she dislikes watching herself act.

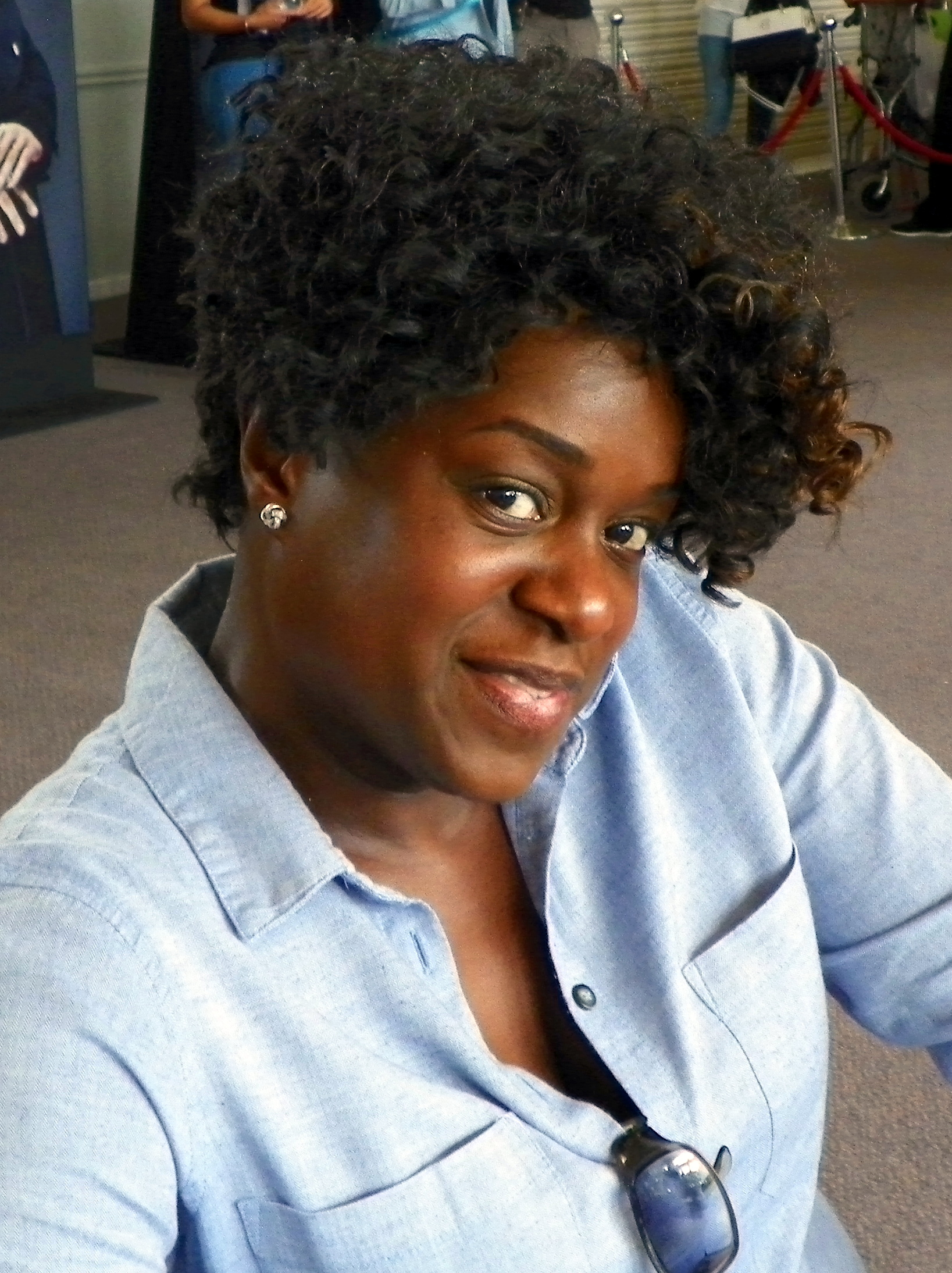
Chantelle feuds with Kim Fox (Tameka Empson, pictured) after moving into her former home.

Writers embedded Chantelle and her family into the show further by having them purchase and move into No. 1 Albert Square. Gray surprises Chantelle with the move and she is pleased with the news. A show insider told Allison Jones of Inside Soap that Chantelle and Karen are "chuffed" about the move and thought that it would strengthen the bond between the characters. They later explained that Chantelle is "overwhelmed" by Gray's decision to buy a house so close to her family and her new job. After learning the news, Chantelle decides that she wants to repair her relationship with Mitch and introduces him to Mia and Mackenzie. As they prepare to move in, Chantelle and the Taylors begin clearing the house, which devastates Kim, who previously owned the house. When Kim spots her belongings being binned, she starts arguing with Karen, causing Mitch to intervene. Chantelle is "mortified" by Karen's arguing, especially when Gray and the children arrive mid-argument. A show insider pointed out that Chantelle would "hate for Gray to see all this and think, 'What the hell have I signed up for?'". Chantelle confronts Karen about her behaviour, but later tries to apologise.

A feud between Chantelle and Kim was developed shortly after the character's introduction. The pair work together at the salon, leaving Denise, who is Kim's sister, in the middle of their feud. A show insider joked that "a United Nations taskforce would have its work cut out in persuading the pair to try to get along." When an important customer comes to the salon, Denise forces Chantelle and Kim to work together. However, Kim soon insults Chantelle, creating a new argument between them. The pair clash again while giving Tina Carter (Luisa Bradshaw-White) a hairdo, but when Denise is forced to intervene, neither Chantelle nor Kim are prepared to explain themselves. A show insider dubbed the clash "totally embarrassing" and compared it to "World War Three". They added that customers are "getting caught in the crossfire of Kim and Chantelle's catty swipes at one another" rather than being able to enjoy the salon experience.

=== Domestic abuse ===
Producers decided to tackle the issue of domestic abuse using the characters of Chantelle and Gray. Oates explained that the characters were initially portrayed as living an envious lifestyle with a "perfect relationship and no-filter-needed looks", before exploring that any relationship can be affected by domestic abuse. The storyline was not announced prior to transmission and Gray's first seen attack on Chantelle also marks the first time that viewers have seen inside the family's home. On the plot, Oates commented, "there is truth in the old adage that you don't know what goes on behind closed doors". She added that Chantelle is presented as "strong and capable" with a good support network, but still believes that she cannot reveal her abuse, which she sees as "a shameful secret". Plummer felt "honoured" to be asked to perform the story and wanted to raise awareness for the topic. She also hoped that victims of domestic abuse would be encouraged to seek support. To accurately portray the storyline, EastEnders worked with charities Refuge and Women's Aid. The show's research team worked with the charities throughout the entire process, from the early stages of the plot to the script details. They also employed experts on-set to assist with the filming of the story. Women's Aid introduced Plummer and the scriptwriters to a domestic abuse survivor, so they could gain an insight into the reality of domestic abuse. Sandra Horley, the chief executive of Refuge, praised the soap for exploring the "insidious issue", while Teresa Parker, the head of communications for Women's Aid, expressed her delight at working with EastEnders on the storyline.

The story begins when Chantelle and Gray return home following a charity race. Gray and Mitch both take part in the race, although Mitch cheats, which infuriates Gray. He and Chantelle return home, where Gray attacks her. The couple then sat together for their evening meal in a "sinister" twist. Smith explained that Gray uses charisma as "a front for the power and control he exerts over Chantelle". On Chantelle's reasons for staying with Gray, a show publicist commented, "Chantelle wants to believe in their fairy-tale life too, and with her children to care for, she isn't prepared to walk away." Plummer was excited for the story to be screened and enjoyed having a story that she could "really get stuck into". Following the reveal, writers explored the couple's relationship further, in private and public. Oates explained that they wanted to build the storyline "gently", while simultaneously developing other characters' opinions on Chantelle and Gray's marriage, and the "kind of man that Gray is". She added that the story follows a show tradition of important issue-led stories. Chantelle is subject to further assaults after tensions flare between Gray and the Taylor family. Writers plotted episodes where Chantelle ceases contact with her father in a bid to ease the abuse, but this does not help. A show spokesperson explained that Chantelle is in "a terrible situation" as violence becomes a regular occurrence with nobody realising the truth.

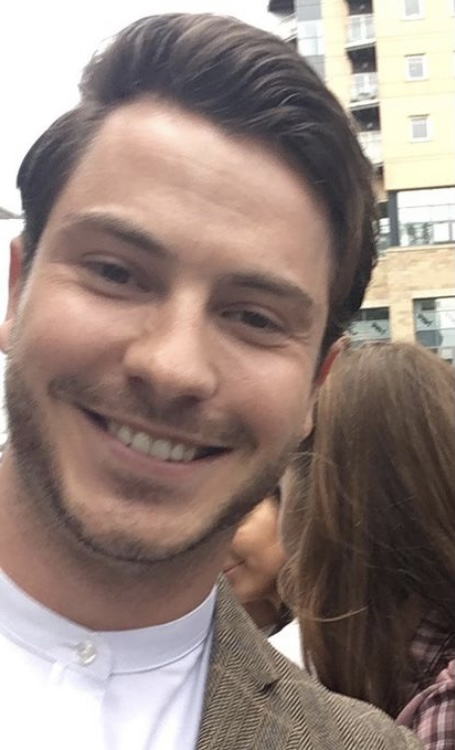
Toby-Alexander Smith, who portrays Gray, explained that his character wants total control over Chantelle.

The story was developed when Chantelle discovers that she is pregnant, following an attack from Gray. Writers highlighted how Gray's control impacts Chantelle's working life too. When competing in a hairdressing competition, Chantelle is bombarded with text messages from Gray, so withdraws from the competition. Smith explained that Gray wants to be in total control, so when something deviates from his plan, he loses panics and lashes out in anger. He commented, "There's a very insecure side to Gray and it's a fear of losing the things he needs around him." At home, Chantelle and Gray argue and when Gray goes to hurt Chantelle, she reveals her pregnancy. The plot development led to a greater exploration in Gray's character. Smith felt that the pregnancy encourages Gray to "reshape his values and beliefs" and change his attitude, but it also depends on "whether he can lose that entitlement". Gray agrees to seek counselling for his behaviour, which Smith believed was for the sake of his unborn child rather than his wife. The actor told Inside Soap's Laura-Jayne Tyler that it is alarming that "it's taken something quite intrinsic in terms of having another child to encourage him to get therapy, rather than it being self-motivated".

Following her pregnancy discovery, writers decided to expose Chantelle's abuse to a hospital nurse. A show publicist suggested that the nurse discovering Chantelle's bruises "could be the breakthrough that saves [Chantelle]". With Chantelle pregnant, Gray begins to use other ways to exert control over his wife. After disobeying his orders, Gray opts to announce Chantelle's pregnancy to their friends and family. Sasha Morris, writing for the Daily Star, reported in October 2019 that Plummer had been filming without a baby bump, suggesting that Chantelle would lose her baby. Later that month, episodes feature Chantelle learning that she has suffered a miscarriage but decides not to tell Gray. A show spokesperson told Tyler (Inside Soap) that Chantelle does not tell him because she realises it is the reason that he has not attacked her. After another argument, Chantelle admits to being scared of her husband, so he invites her to his therapy session. The session fails and Gray admits that he is scared that she will leave him.

Teasing the show's 2020 episodes, Jon Sen, the show's executive producer, revealed that Chantelle would begin to question "whether Gray will ever change". The story took a focus over the Christmas period as the couple renew their wedding vows. Chantelle feels anxious about the ceremony and unsuccessfully tries to cancel it. A show publicist dubbed the situation "a nightmare Chantelle can't wake up from." More aspects of Gray's control of Chantelle were depicted after their return from honeymoon. He regularly coerces her into sex, hoping to get her pregnant. After a negative pregnancy test, Gray attacks Chantelle and breaks her arm. He then begins to isolate her from her friends and family. In January 2020, Smith confirmed that Mia and Mackenzie would be drawn into the abuse story. He told Hill (Daily Mirror) that it is "a very important thing to consider that children are very savvy with the arguments that their parents have." Chantelle's abuse continues as Gray's professional life becomes more stressful. Gray is suspended from work and Smith explained that Gray wants to cover up his real behaviour and uses his work as an "extra layer of protection" from people discovering the truth. Mitch learns about the suspension, angering Gray, who attacks Chantelle. However, when he learns she is not responsible for Mitch's discovery, Gray feels remorseful. Smith told Ellis (Inside Soap) that Gray is "madly in love with Chantelle, which is ironic".

Producers incorporated Kheerat Panesar (Jaz Deol) into the story when he offers Chantelle a job at his call centre. She enjoys working at the call centre, but struggles to manage her home and work lives. A show spokesperson explained that Chantelle is waiting for Gray to lash out. They commented, "Chantelle lives on her nerves at the best of times, but now it's situation critical". In one scenario, the call centre suffers a power cut and Chantelle and Kheerat become locked in the building without phone signal. This situation creates anxiety for Chantelle and almost leads to her admitting the abuse to Kheerat. A show insider dubbed this a "disaster for Chantelle". For these episodes, a promotional trailer was released on 1 May 2020. The friendship between Chantelle and Kheerat was used to heighten Gray's suspicion as he believes they are having an affair. Smith explained that Gray "assumes she's betrayed him", so he sets a tracker on the family car to catch her out. The scenes aired during the show's final episodes before a transmission break, which was a result of a filming break enforced by the COVID-19 pandemic. The episodes were promoted in a trailer released on 15 June 2020.

=== Departure ===
Producers concluded the domestic abuse story with Chantelle's departure from the series. In the narrative, the character is killed by Gray, a decision which had been planned from the beginning of the story. Oates was inspired to portray the story's outcome after hearing a story from radio magazine show Woman's Hour and learning the high statistic of woman killed by a partner. Such a story outcome had not been portrayed in a soap or serial drama before, which also enticed Oates to commission the plot. Plummer had been informed in December 2019 that she would be written out of the series. She admitted that although she had guessed the story's outcome, she was still shocked to be told and found herself grieving for the character. Originally, it was planned that the actress would finish filming in April or May 2020, but when the show suspended filming in March, her exit was delayed. Plummer did not find out when she would leave until she received her scripts for the show's return, but was pleased that her exit features in the first episodes to air after the break.

"As much as it isn't nice for viewers to see, this is real life and this is sometimes how it ends for people. There needs to be an awareness around that. I also think it's important to see a different dynamic in Gray and Chantelle – both as a relationship and individually. She is strong, she's independent, she earns her own money – from the outside looking in, they are the perfect couple."

— Plummer on why the story ends with Chantelle's death.

The character's death was announced on 6 September 2020, ahead of transmission. Plummer felt it was important to announce the story development ahead of time due to the sensitive nature of the plot and did not believe that it lessened the impact of her character's death. She expressed her gratitude at playing the character, but highlighted the importance of telling the story, so that other women were able to recognise their situations and leave before this happened to them too. Plummer received praise from Sen, Smith and Parker (Women's Aid) for her portrayal of Chantelle and the story. As well as Plummer, all three expressed their hope that Chantelle's death would help those in a similar situation. Sen called her performance "nothing short of extraordinary" and expressed his disappointment at her departure. Smith added that he would miss working with Plummer. Plummer recognised that her character's death may not be what audiences want to see, but believed it was important that they did see it, as it reflected real life. A promotional trailer was released for the show's return, including Chantelle's departure, on 1 September 2020.

EastEnders continued their work with Women's Aid and Refuge when researching the story, which reflected statistics in domestic violence during lockdown. Sen opined that it was important to portray these statistics and hoped that the story would encourage victims to seek support. Smith called the work with the charities "invaluable in understanding the mindset of an abuser and the awful realities of abusive relationships". He had previously called for the show to explore the impact of the COVID-19 pandemic on domestic violence, calling it a relevant topic which people could relate to. Parker and Lisa King, the director of communications and external relations at Refuge, praised the EastEnders team for their work on the story. Parker noted that Chantelle's story would accurately reflect the pandemic's impact on domestic violence. Following criticism that the story may discourage victims of domestic abuse from leaving, Parker told Dainty (Digital Spy) that it is a realistic conclusion supported by research and wanted it to create "important conversations". Plummer maintained contact with a woman who survived domestic abuse, having met in the initial meetings with the charities. She used this contact as a primary point of research and learnt a lot from this woman. Reflecting on the entire story, Plummer opined that they had covered many ways which Gray is abusive towards Chantelle and acknowledged that "not one single bit of his behaviour has been acceptable".

Plans to explore domestic abuse in lockdown using the characters were announced on 13 August 2020. During the lockdown, Chantelle, Gray and the children were isolated together. Plummer explained that Gray's behaviour became controlling rather than physical, as the children were always there. She added that lockdown "catapulted his behaviour into becoming as bad as it could be". Chantelle decides to leave Gray and take her children. Plummer thought that Chantelle's decision follows months of not needing to "[keep] up appearances" and finally recognising her own situation. Appearing on EastEnders: Secrets from the Square, the actress told presenter Stacey Dooley that Chantelle finally realises that Gray's behaviour will not change, so she finds her "inner Taylor" and decides to escape her marriage. Oates noted that Chantelle "hasn't had it easy" in lockdown, sparking a "huge story" for her family. Chantelle meets a divorce lawyer to discuss her plans, but learns how expensive the process is. She then asks Kheerat to loan her the money she needs, which he agrees to once he learns her reasons. Plummer explained that Chantelle trusts Kheerat a lot and feels "safe" with him. She added that Chantelle has started to develop feelings for him. As Gray becomes more controlling, he takes Chantelle's credit card and adds a tracker to her phone. He then suspects something is happening when he spots adverts for divorce lawyers on her laptop. In one situation, Gray exerts his control over Chantelle by making her hold her breath underwater for two minutes.

The show's story team made Chantelle's story the focus of her final week in the show. In her plans to run away with the children, Chantelle joins the Taylors on a seaside holiday. Plummer noted how Chantelle is prepared to "[run] away with just the clothes on her back". The character's relationships with her parents are explored before her departure. Mitch notices something is wrong and Chantelle considers opening up to him. Plummer explained that Chantelle does not tell her father because she wants to protect him, in fear that he will kill Gray. She added that Chantelle appreciated how even though she is not as close to Mitch, he notices her distant attitude. In contrast, Karen admires Chantelle's new life and sees it as "perfect". Plummer thought that Chantelle feels "resentful" about Karen not noticing the issues. Filming took place under strict conditions with social distancing measures implemented on-set. Directors worked hard to create high-quality drama that was believable under such restrictive measures. Smith was impressed with the scripts but felt the production team had the "imagination and ambition" required to make it work. He likened some of the final scenes to a dance due to how choreographed they became.

Chantelle is impaled to death by a kitchen knife in the dishwasher after Gray pushes her (2020).

Chantelle's death features in episode 6132, originally broadcast on 18 September. The character's final episode follows Chantelle as she stands up to Gray and announces her plans to leave. They have an argument which concludes with Gray pushing Chantelle onto a knife. Plummer and Smith filmed this entire segment, which lasted for approximately 15 minutes, in one take, which is unusual for regular filming. The actress explained that they did this to avoid losing momentum and likened it to being in theatre. Plummer was not looking forward to leaving her character and hoped to delay filming her final scenes. She felt pressure to perform the final episode well as she wanted to "do justice for every woman that has been in the situation". The second half of the episode focuses on Gray as he establishes himself an alibi while Chantelle dies at home. Plummer hoped that Gray would receive his comeuppance for his actions and looked forward to watching the story as a viewer. Writers had foreshadowed the nature of Chantelle's death in scenes broadcast in January 2020, which was noticed by viewers after broadcast of her death. In the scenes, Gray warns Chantelle about placing cutlery up in the dishwasher.

== Reception ==
=== Awards and nominations ===
For her portrayal of Chantelle, Plummer was shortlisted for the Best Newcomer award at the 2019 Inside Soap Awards, and nominated for the Best Soap Newcomer award at the 23rd TV Choice Awards in that same year. Plummer was voted second in the Best Soap Newcomer category at the Digital Spy Reader Awards in 2019. At the 2020 Inside Soap Awards, Plummer won the accolade for Best Actress. She described the award as "one of the biggest achievements of [her] career". The actress also won the Best Soap Female Actor award at the 2020 Digital Spy Reader Awards. At the ceremony, the character's death also won the award for Most Devastating Death, while the domestic abuse story was voted second in the Best Storyline category.

=== Critical response ===
Johnathon Hughes of the Radio Times called Chantelle "the much talked-about, but hitherto-unseen, eldest offspring of the rowdy Taylor clan". The Liverpool Echo's Lottie Gibbons noted that Chantelle's life appears successful as she "has everything she's ever wanted". On the character's arrival, Sophie Dainty from Digital Spy commented, "Watch out Walford: trouble is brewing." Claire Crick, writing for What's on TV, observed that viewers "[could not] be happier" about Chantelle's arrival and dubbed her "an immediate hit". She also expected Chantelle and her family would "shake things up in the Taylor house". The reporter later billed Chantelle and Kim as "chalk and cheese". Angie Quinn of MyLondon described the character as "sassy" and "pretty", and enjoyed the "hilarious" banter between Chantelle, Denise, Kim and Karen in her early episodes. Quinn later described the Atkins family a "good extension" to the Taylor family and said that they "look like the most perfect couple in EastEnders". Inside Soap's Laura-Jayne Tyler praised the characters of Chantelle and Gray following their introduction. She opined, "The potential for huge drama is practically dripping off them! [...] Mark our words, there's a massive plot brewing here..."

Hill (Daily Mirror) observed that viewers were "horrified" by Chantelle's abuse from Gray, while Charlie Milward of the Daily Express dubbed the scenes "upsetting" and thought that the story would become "more unsettling and deceptive". His colleague, Helen Daly, described the plot as "harrowing" and "an uncomfortable watch". Hughes (Radio Times) thought that the abuse story was "compelling". The story was compared to EastEnders' domestic violence story featuring Little Mo Morgan (Kacey Ainsworth) and Trevor Morgan (Alex Ferns), which aired in 2002. The comparison emphasised the importance of the story to Plummer and Smith, who felt they had a "responsibility" to portray it accurately. On the reveal of the story, an Inside Soap reporter wrote, "Just when we were starting to believe that Chantelle and Gray were the perfect couple, the discovery of what really goes on behind their front door has knocked us for six." The Metro's Duncan Lindsay thought that the domestic abuse story made it "an exciting time to be an EastEnders fan". Daily Mirror reporter Kyle O'Sullivan labelled the plot "powerful yet uncomfortable" and thought that Gray's attacks on Chantelle were "horrifying" and "distressing". On Chantelle's miscarriage, Tyler (Inside Soap) opined, "The crushing reality of Chantelle's situation hit home as she was forced to conceal her miscarriage from Gray – just because he might start beating her again. The horror of it all."

In June 2020, Smith revealed that Women's Aid had experienced a rise in calls with people relating to Chantelle and Gray's abuse story. Hughes (Radio Times) opined that there was "bags of potential" for the domestic abuse story following the show's return to transmission, with links to the national lockdown. He commented, "There are so many directions this story could go and we cannot wait to find out which one they choose." David Brown, writing for the Metro, also thought it would be good to explore domestic abuse in lockdown using the characters of Chantelle and Gray. He called it "a pressure-cooker situation [that] is about to boil over" and thought it would reflect the 20% rise in domestic abuse in lockdown. He concluded, "It would certainly make for a gripping and topical storyline to pull viewers back in and highlight the terrifying predicament of abuse in lockdown." His colleague, Sarah Deen, called the scenes of Gray forcing Chantelle to hold her breath underwater "disturbing" and "another chilling scene of abuse". Other television critics and viewers also expressed their horror at the scenes. Megan Davies (Digital Spy) described them as "harrowing" and "distressing". Crick (What's on TV) dubbed them "incredibly difficult viewing".

Ellis called the abuse story "hard-hitting" and "gritty" with a "stunning conclusion". She also described Chantelle's death as "tragic" and expected it to leave viewers "numb with shock". Crick (What's on TV) opined that Chantelle's death was "some of the toughest scenes EastEnders has ever aired". Scriptwriter Daran Little praised the conclusion to the domestic abuse story, especially under the new filming restrictions. Dainty (Digital Spy) billed Chantelle's death as "some of the most harrowing scenes in [the show's] history". She praised the "astonishing" performances of Plummer in the episode as she portrayed "agonising and unforgettable final scenes" of Chantelle, and recognised that it was "an undeniably difficult watch". Her colleague, Joe Anderton, described the character's death as "chilling and devastating". Writing for the 2020 Digital Spy Reader Awards, Abby Robinson recognised that "even people who didn't tune in religiously (or at all) to EastEnders took an interest in this story" and was unsurprised when it won the award for Best Storyline. Plummer received a positive response from the audience following her character's departure and called her "a loved character".
