= Bradley Taylor =

English poet (b1998)

Bradley Taylor (b. 1998) is an English poet, and the 25th poet laureate of Birmingham. He is known for writing on a typewriter that he brings with him to events, and for creating poetry on demand. He won the Roundhouse Poetry Slam in 2024. Peaky Blinders creator Steven Knight commissioned him to write a poem, "By Order of the People," and deliver it as his address to an event he could not attend in 2025.
