= Episode 5949 =

2019 EastEnders episode

- EastEnders episode
- Episode no.: Episode 5949
- Directed by: Laurence Wilson
- Written by: Pete Lawson
- Story by: Nasreen Ahmed
- Editing by: Lauren Connors
- Original air date: 5 July 2019
- Running time: 28 minutes

Episode chronology
← Previous "Episode 5948"	Next → "Episode 5950"

"Episode 5949" (alternatively titled "Walford Pride") of the British television soap opera EastEnders was originally broadcast on BBC One on 5 July 2019. It was written by Pete Lawson, directed by Laurence Wilson, and produced by Kate Oates. The episode takes place on the day Walford is holding its first pride parade and primarily focuses on the show's LGBT characters, mainly Callum Highway (Tony Clay), Ben Mitchell (Max Bowden), and Bernadette Taylor (Clair Norris). The episode was announced on 1 May 2019 and was set to air one day before the 2019 Pride in London festival. Since her time as executive producer, Oates aimed increase and celebrate diversity on the show, with the episode being pitched as part of Oates's goal. The episode received generally positive critical acclaim and was included in the EastEnders: Iconic Episodes collection in 2021.

== Plot ==
On the day Walford is holding its first LGBT pride parade, Karen Taylor (Lorraine Stanley) scolds Tiffany Butcher (Maisie Smith) for breaking her daughter, Bernadette's (Clair Norris) heart recently, so to cheer Bernadette up, Karen enthusiastically prepares her family to attend the parade to show their support. Kathy Beale (Gillian Taylforth) dresses her bar The Prince Albert for the event, but needs extra help decorating. She enlists the help of the closeted Callum Highway (Tony Clay) only for his homophobic brother Stuart (Ricky Champ) to walk in during the shift. Meanwhile, at the Slater house, Kat Moon (Jessie Wallace) is angry as she believes Martin Fowler (James Bye) stole money from her husband, Alfie (Shane Richie), as most of it is missing. Kat refuses to reveal why she needs the money.

At a restaurant, Stuart asks Callum if there is anything he wants to tell him, revealing that he saw him kissing Ben Mitchell (Max Bowden) the previous night. While Callum insists that Ben is just a friend, he admits that he is having more complicated feelings and that things "just happened" that night, insisting that nothing occurred since or before, enforcing that he loves his fiancé, Whitney Dean (Shona McGarty). While Bernadette talks with Tina Carter (Luisa Bradshaw-White), Tina says Bernadette should be thankful to have such a supportive family, despite being slightly embarrassed by them. Later, Martin's wife, Stacey (Lacey Turner) figures out that Kat wants the money to give it to Kush Kazemi (Davood Ghadami), so he can take Martin and Stacey to court to gain custody of Kush's son, Arthur (Hunter Bell), which is why Kat is adamant that Martin took it. Martin swears to Stacey that he did not take the money.

Bernadette stops Karen from kissing a woman before Karen proclaims that she will always be proud of her. Stacey returns home and catches Kat searching through her wardrobe, before admitting that she was the one who took the money. When Stuart catches Ben groping Callum in The Prince Albert, He threatens Ben and tells him to leave Callum alone, only for Ben to mock him before Kathy breaks up the situation. Ben tells Stuart to meet him in The Arches that night, and while a drag artist (Crystal Rasmussen) performs in Albert Square, Ben proclaims that he refuses to cower to Stuart, only to suffer a brutal hate crime by him.

== Cast and characters ==
- Max Bowden as Ben Mitchell
- Tony Clay as Callum Highway
- Ricky Champ as Stuart Highway
- Clair Norris as Bernadette Taylor
- Luisa Bradshaw-White as Tina Carter
- Lorraine Stanley as Karen Taylor
- Roger Griffiths as Mitch Baker
- Jessie Wallace as Kat Moon
- Lacey Turner as Stacey Fowler
- James Bye as Martin Fowler
- Laila Morse as Mo Harris
- Gillian Wright as Jean Slater
- Shona McGarty as Whitney Dean
- Maisie Smith as Tiffany Butcher
- Gillian Taylforth as Kathy Beale
- Clay Milner Russell as Bobby Beale
- Jessica Plummer as Chantelle Atkins
- Toby-Alexander Smith as Gray Atkins
- Zack Morris as Keegan Baker
- Danny Walters as Keanu Taylor
- Christopher Timothy as Ted Murray
- Rukku Nahar as Habiba Ahmed
- Priya Davdra as Iqra Ahmed
- Stephen Rahman-Hughes as Adam Bateman
- Emma Barton as Honey Mitchell
- Tilly Keeper as Louise Mitchell
- Jasmine Armfield as Bex Fowler
- Crystal Rasmussen as drag artist
- Amy Robbins as Caren

== Background and production ==
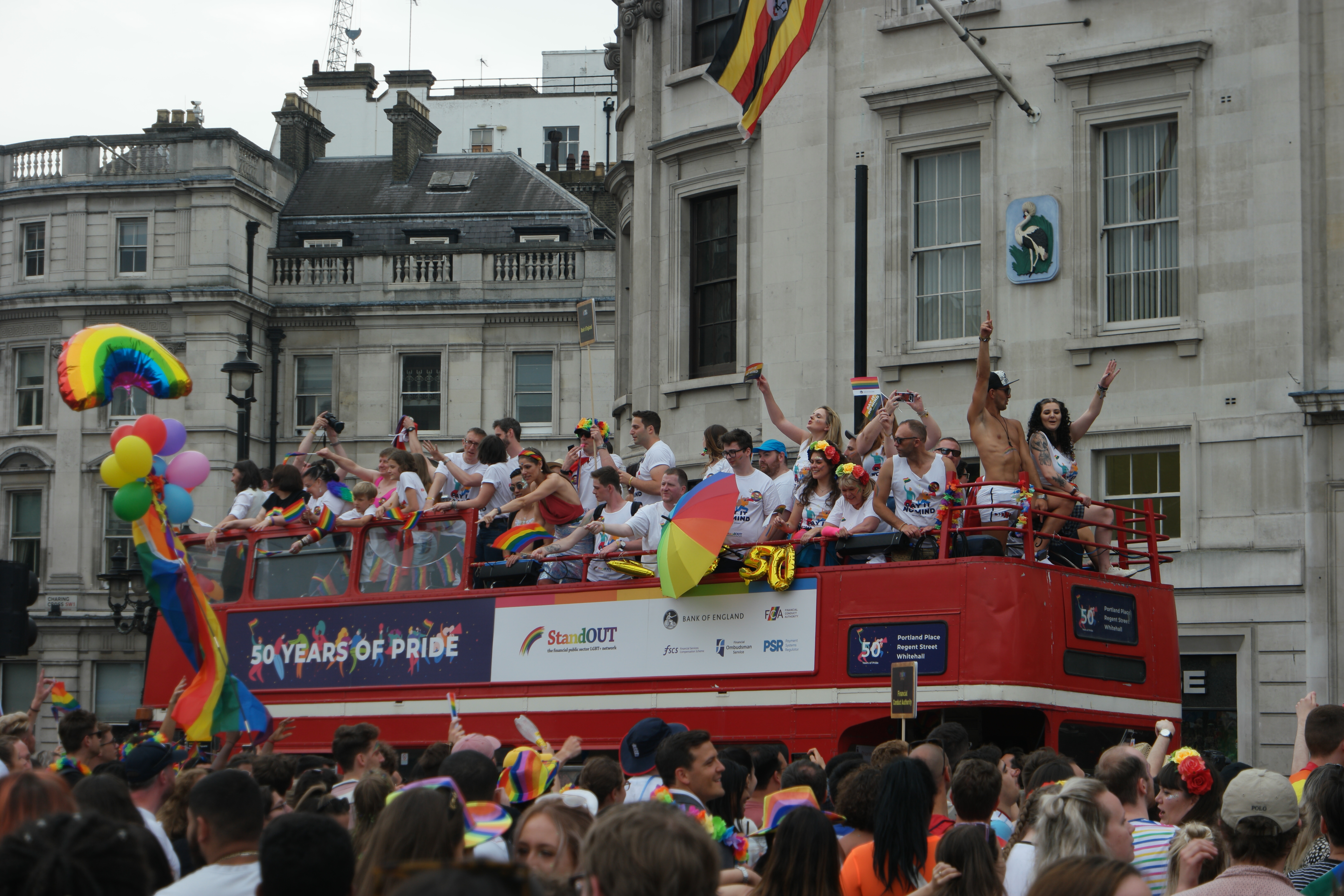
The episode was scheduled to air the day before London Pride 2019 (pictured)

The episode was announced on 1 May 2019, with the episode being set take place in July and air one day before the 2019 London Pride event. The episode was penned to contribute to executive producer Kate Oates's attempts to make the show "more reflective of modern day east London". Oates aimed to represent "multi-cultural London" by improving and celebrating diversity on the show. The show aimed for the episode to celebrate gay equality and the episode was teased as "going to be a huge event on the Square filled with joy, but, as with any event on Albert Square, there is certain to be plenty of drama happening alongside the celebration". Speaking to fans in a Twitter video, Oates said: "I am really interested in bringing some more LGBTQ characters in, and maybe we will have a new precinct for them as well. We are looking at opening a gay bar on the square which will be a super-cool precinct where gay and straight characters can all just hang out. Loads of stories can cross and should just be something really exciting, really fun, really visual and feel really true to multicultural London".

In an interview with Inside Soap, Tony Clay teased his character's role in the upcoming episode, explaining: "I love the contrast of Callum's story with Pride this week – the celebrations make him think 'Actually this is really beautiful and I'd love to be a part of it'. Pride shows him that being gay isn't something to shy away from. Nobody should ever feel as though they can't live their truth and people should embrace who they truly are". Crystal Rasmussen, who played a drag artist in the episode, said the episode was "a really celebratory moment where everyone is joining in. They had a lot of queer people on set like me and a lot of my friends from the east London night life and it really did feel like a momentary feeling of Pride".

=== Re-airings ===
During the COVID-19 pandemic, the show was forced to halt production, so began re-airing some of its pre-lockdown episodes, with episode 5949 being included. In January 2021, the show uploaded some of its most iconic episodes to BBC iPlayer, under the name EastEnders: Iconic Episodes. This episode was included and was the most recent of those selected.

== Reception ==
Upon the episode's announcement, the charity Stonewall praised the decision for the show to hold a pride event, with a spokesperson saying: "It's been more than 30 years since EastEnders featured the UK's first on-screen same-sex kiss. (Note: In 1989, the show aired a same-sex mouth-to-mouth kiss between characters Colin Russell (Michael Cashman) and Guido Smith (Nicholas Donovan), the first in British television history.) So it's great to hear Walford will be celebrating Pride". BBC Bitesize described the episode as "celebratory, diverse and educational", and praised that it "included moments that reminded the audience of the prejudice and discrimination still faced by the LGBTQ community to this day", adding that the episode was "iconic". Ali Griffiths of Digital Spy called the episode "groundbreaking". In a tweet, Bowden proclaimed that the reaction to the episode "warmed [his] heart". Rasmussen received praise for their performance of Heather Small's "Proud" in the episode. Angie Quinn of MyLondon described the episode as "a dedication to Pride", particularly praising Karen's role in the episode as a supportive mother. She added: "The amazing episode also included a performance from a drag queen who brilliantly sang a version of Proud by Heather Small, as Walford's residents came together to celebrate the occasion". Jess Flaherty of Liverpool Echo reported that the re-airing received positive reactions from viewers. Stephen Patterson of Metro deemed the episode "equally as iconic" as the other episodes included in EastEnders: Iconic Episodes, despite being more recent, and that it "certainly deserve[d] to be seen again". Patterson also declared: "The soap's 5,949th episode, Pride is a more recent offering — having originally been broadcast on 5 July 2019 — but it's every bit as memorable and important as the previous instalments broadcast during the Iconic Episodes slot".

Figures compiled by the Broadcasters' Audience Research Board (BARB) indicated the episode had been watched by 4.96 million viewers.
