= The Six (EastEnders) =

Storyline in the BBC soap opera EastEnders

"The Six" surrounding the body of an unidentified man in the show's first flashforward scene broadcast on 20 February 2023.

"The Six" is a storyline from the BBC soap opera EastEnders. The storyline began in episode 6649, broadcast on 20 February 2023, which featured the show's first flashforward sequence at the end of the episode. The scene showed six female EastEnders characters, Denise Fox (Diane Parish), Linda Carter (Kellie Bright), Kathy Beale (Gillian Taylforth), Sharon Watts (Letitia Dean), Stacey Slater (Lacey Turner), and Suki Panesar (Balvinder Sopal) in The Queen Victoria public house on Christmas Day standing around an unidentified male body lying on the floor, who they presume to be dead. Events leading up to Christmas that year put each character in the frame to be the potential murderer and several male characters to be the victim. The storyline was intended to be written a different type of "whodunit" mystery, as both the victim and the murderer were kept as a tight secret.

When Christmas Day 2023 arrived, in an episode that attracted 5.45 million viewers, the victim was revealed to be Nish Panesar (Navin Chowdhry), with Denise having struck him over the head with a broken champagne bottle in defence of Suki. However, Nish survived and Keanu Taylor (Danny Walters) was fatally stabbed by Linda with a meat thermometer in defence of Sharon moments later after he burst into the pub, encountering The Six standing over an unconscious Nish. Following the crime, the remainder of the storyline followed The Six's attempts to cover it up.

== Storyline creation and development ==
The storyline began its creation in August 2022, as executive producer Chris Clenshaw had been thinking of ideas for a "blockbuster story" for 2023, and noticing that there was an appetite for a new whodunit plot in EastEnders, decided to draft one. He explained that due to the success, but recency of the "Who Killed Lucy Beale?" storyline, he decided that this one would "have a very different mechanic at its core". "The Six" differed from the typical format of a whodunit story, as both the killer and victim were kept under wraps. The different framing was employed as producers and writers believed it would be more interesting, with the structure being described by Clenshaw as "so much more than a 'whodunit'… It's a 'who-is-it' as well". He added that it was important to try a new format as it "can create intrigue and grip and excite our audience in new ways" while still remaining true to the heart of the show.

It was first teased in December 2022, with Clenshaw teasing a never-before done storyline that would commence in February 2023, and centre around Linda Carter (Kellie Bright). On 3 February, it was revealed that the upcoming story would not just focus on Linda, but also five other female characters; Denise Fox (Diane Parish), Kathy Beale (Gillian Taylforth), Sharon Watts (Letitia Dean), Stacey Slater (Lacey Turner), and Suki Panesar (Balvinder Sopal), with the women later being dubbed "The Six". Clenshaw explained that the reason why all of "The Six" were women was because "EastEnders has always had strong women at its heart", and that each individual character was chosen based on audience popularity. Clenshaw detailed that he was convinced to commission the plot as he and the team had been "looking for a vehicle for The Six [...] to come together, and we were looking for an episode to get viewers really excited as we setup an event that they'll hopefully look forward to all year".

The actresses were told that they would star in the storyline in November 2022, and were confused yet intrigued to hear about the storyline and the flashforward scene, and had a lot of questions. Despite this, they were given few details and were not told who the killer or the victim were. Taylforth commented that she was "very excited" to be part of the storyline, disclosing that "We were all quite inquisitive about what was going to happen, and who it was going to be, and all of us are still none the wiser". Parish considered the idea of a flash-forward scene to be "brilliant, bold, and brave". Dean commented: "I think we were all really excited about the storyline and to be a part of it". Bright echoed Dean's excitement, noting that she was "very intrigued" due to the limited details the cast were given. Turner was honoured to be included among the six, saying "this is six amazingly talented, super strong women, so I feel quite chuffed to be a part of it really". Sopal hoped her character would be the killer, as, in her words: "I think it adds an extra dangerous element to her".

In early February 2023 multiple trailers for the upcoming story were released, written by Daran Little. Ahead of the flashforward scene, which was shot in January 2023 and was the first in the show's history and aired on the show's 38th anniversary, Clenshaw disclosed that "[The team were] all incredibly excited for [the] episode [and] what may seem like a regular day in Walford soon takes a twist and what transpires for each and every one of them is that in a flash everything changes". Clenshaw teased that the upcoming episode would "leave the audience with a lot of questions and, what may seem like the end, is only just the beginning of some very big storylines that will play out this year". According to Clenshaw, The Six were initially supposed to wear different shades of red in the flashforward, but decided to give each character their own colour after concluding they helped represent each member better and that the red "didn't feel right". Phrases such as "in a flash, everything changes" and "for whom the bell tolls" were often used to market the storyline.

After three months Bright teased that the storyline would "ramp up" in September 2023, as the actress explained: "That's when you'll see all that stuff come to the fore again, then we'll have a big build-up to Christmas". That same month, Clenshaw called Bright in to tell her that she would be the murderer and that Keanu would be the victim. Clenshaw also told Bright that the murder was in defence of Sharon. Clenshaw disclosed that the storyline would "dominate the autumn and the build to Christmas" as The Six would be thrown in the limelight and that it would keep viewers "guessing right up until the very end". Clenshaw said that himself and the team were "thrilled" at the reaction the storyline garnered from fans, noting that it was part of the aim, explaining "we wanted people to chat, we wanted people to speculate, we wanted everyone to come up with their own theories and share those theories with one another. We wanted it to be a storyline that actually brings the fans together, so we're absolutely over the moon that it seems to be doing that and the fans are enjoying being a part of it". Clenshaw further described the upcoming Christmas as "an ensemble affair", noting that usually one family is the focus of EastEnders Christmas episodes.

Clenshaw noted that the characters only became "The Six" after the murder was committed, explaining: "Each of those women will become The Six from Christmas Day onwards". When asked if "The Six" storyline would build towards the show's 40th anniversary in February 2025, Clenshaw responded that "there's obviously huge consequences playing into next year from the fallout of what happens at Christmas. We've got a very exciting 2024 planned. We are building to the 40th anniversary. I'm obviously not going to say too much about what we've got planned, it's over a year away from now! I suppose I can guarantee that it will be a huge celebration for the show". Upon discovering that Keanu was the victim of the murder, the cast members were all reportedly shocked. Despite the show being "known for its dramatic Christmas Day storylines" and needing a "high element of drama", Clenshaw and the team aimed for the episode to feel Christmas-like as the show is "about family and about community".

Multiple endings were filmed so the other actresses were kept in the dark. Various tactics were employed to conceal Keanu being the victim, which Clenshaw disclosed after the airing of the Christmas episode. Prior to revealing, Clenshaw teased: "We've had several methods in place throughout the entire year to keep the storyline a secret and to ensure that the Christmas Day episode and the big reveal of who's on the floor – plus who does it – remains under wraps until the 25th December. Sadly, I can't reveal what those methods are as that would give everything away, but it would be a real shame if anyone spoiled the surprise as we know how much the audience love watching the drama unfold in real-time". Some of these methods included filming multiple endings to keep the cast in the dark, a body double being used for the body in the flashforward, and having Walters film fake scenes that took place after Christmas to throw paparazzi off the scent.

=== EastEnders: The Six ===
In late November 2023 the show announced that a two-part spin-off chat show/documentary would air in the lead-up to Christmas. The show was named EastEnders: The Six (also titled EastEnders: The Six – Revealed), and would be hosted by Joe Swash, who formerly played Mickey Miller on EastEnders. It was set to feature the actresses who played The Six as guests. Clenshaw teased that the special would give viewers a chance to hear from the actresses, as well as to hear their theories and give "exclusive news" about the upcoming Christmas episode. It would also include recaps of each character's storylines throughout 2023. Swash enjoyed hosting the special, detailing: "I absolutely loved being back in my old stomping ground, Albert Square. EastEnders holds such great memories for me, and it felt so great to be back. I loved reconnecting with Letitia [Dean], Lacey [Turner] and Diane [Parish] who I love dearly and worked with on my last stint in the show, and it was great to meet Kellie [Bright], Gillian [Taylforth] and Balvinder [Sopal] as we looked back at some of their amazing storylines from the year". The show featured each actress's reaction to discovering Bright's Linda was the killer and included the moment Clenshaw told Bright her character would be the culprit and that Keanu would be the victim. Bright later elaborated that she was shocked by the reveal and struggled to keep the secret from her friends, family, and co-workers.

== Suspects and motives ==
The six women were treated as the suspects to the murder, with an official list of seven male characters to be the potential body being released in December 2023. The body in the flashforward scene was seen to be wearing a suit with distinctive amber cufflinks, which made appearances throughout the run-up to Christmas being owned by several male characters and being used to narrow down suspects. Speculation was rife following the initial airing of the flashforward, as hints and clues were broadcast in the show and motives were teased online. Jack Branning (Scott Maslen), Phil Mitchell (Steve McFadden), and Tom "Rocky" Cotton (Brian Conley) were generally written off from being the potential body. While the breakdown of Jack's marriage to Denise and briefly owning the cufflinks were put forward as reasons, Jack was generally not considered to be the victim of the murder as many of the clues were written off as being obvious red herrings. Phil also briefly owned the amber cufflinks and had made multiple enemies within "The Six", but as he is considered one of the soap's most high-profile characters, was deemed too important to be killed. Rocky hiding multiple secrets from his wife Kathy and burning down her café were entertained as speculations, as well as Conley's upcoming exit which would closely coincide with Christmas Day, but he was ruled out for having few connections to the rest of "The Six" and his actions being considered undeserving of a violent Christmas murder as a comeuppance. Conley admitted that, while he wanted to stay, it would be fun to be at the centre of a high-profile moment, saying: "I might only last till Christmas, and that's the fun of it! I think as actors we all live on tenterhooks to a small degree because you could be written out in two weeks or a week. For me that makes it exciting as well, because you don't know. I think it keeps everyone's game up".

Despite, like Rocky, being considered one of the last deserving suspects of a punishment, eventual victim Keanu Taylor (Danny Walters) was a suspect through his affair with Sharon, as the flashforward scene showed Sharon wearing a wedding dress and being the one to check the man's pulse, which Clenshaw pointed out in an interview. Speaking on his character's fate, Walters commented that Keanu would develop more relationships with other characters throughout the year, which fuelled speculation. However, some had doubts as leaked photos from the set showed Walters wearing a light grey suit for his character's wedding to Sharon, while the body wore a black one. Ravi Gulati (Aaron Thiara) was potentially the body because he had made many enemies throughout his generally short stint and was closely involved in criminal activities, which Thiara acknowledged, commenting that "it's quite hard to fathom that Ravi's made so many enemies in such a short amount of time". Ravi's affair with Denise, as well as the fallout of its discovery was put forward as a potential reason for his murder. However, when the announcement of his ex-girlfriend Priya Nandra-Hart (Sophie Khan Levy) and their second child Avani (Aaliyah James) becoming regular characters with Christmas on the horizon, some viewers cleared Ravi of suspicions as he had become too prominent. This was supported by Laura-Jayne Tyler of Inside Soap, who commented that if Ravi died: "It would be an appalling waste of the Square's big guns".

Dean Wicks (Matt Di Angelo) and Nish Panesar (Navin Chowdhry) were the two characters who were the most speculated to be the victims. Speculation surrounding Dean focused on his rape of Linda in 2014, and his return to the show shortly before Christmas. As he had not received retribution for the assault, some believed he was overdue a punishment. Clenshaw explained that Dean was returning as "a man on the square without any allies", making him "very dangerous", and thus a likely candidate to be murdered. He further entertained the idea of Dean being the victim as he was yet to receive retribution for his actions, explaining: "We always knew we were going to bring Dean back for Linda's storyline this year. He's a character that has such a historical connection to the show, and as we all know, he didn't get his comeuppance". Nish was considered a suspect due to his violent and abusive behaviour, status as a local menace, and Suki's affair with Eve Unwin (Heather Peace). Additionally, the amber cufflinks initially belonged to Nish, with Chowdhry announcing them as "the main clue". Clenshaw teased Suki's motivation to kill Nish by saying she would "uncover truths, have her relationships tested but ultimately her biggest secret could push her to the extreme". Chowdhry admitted that he was aware that Nish was considered "the number one contender" to be killed. Taylforth confirmed that Nish would receive a "comeuppance" for Nish blackmailing Rocky, despite admitting that she didn't think Nish's comeuppance would be linked to it.

== Plot ==
=== Build-up ===
In February 2023, after Denise Fox (Diane Parish), Kathy Beale (Gillian Taylforth), Linda Carter (Kellie Bright), Sharon Watts (Letitia Dean), Stacey Slater (Lacey Turner), and Suki Panesar (Balvinder Sopal) have a lock-in at The Queen Victoria public house, they complain about the men in their lives before toasting: "To men, may they get what they deserve". The screen then flashes forward to the pub on Christmas Day, Christmas music plays and the women are shown surrounding an unidentifiable male body on the floor. Stacey is shown with blood on her hands, Sharon is wearing a wedding dress, Denise is holding a broken wine bottle, and Linda has a bruised lip. Sharon checks the man's pulse, showing he is wearing amber-coloured cufflinks, before declaring that the man is dead.

Christmas Day arrives, Sharon is set to marry Keanu Taylor (Danny Walters), however the wedding is interrupted by Sharon's furious ex, Phil, revealing to Sharon that not only was he the father of Sharon's son Albie (Arthur Gentleman), but that Keanu orchestrated Albie's kidnap earlier in the year, causing Sharon to leave Keanu at the altar. Meanwhile, at the Panesar house, Suki manages to escape her angry husband Nish Panesar (Navin Chowdhry) and The Six women have another lock-in at The Queen Vic. Suki admits that the reason why Nish is angry at her is because she had an affair with Eve Unwin (Heather Peace), which prompts the women to toast "true love". Sharon then catches everyone up about what happened at the wedding. Suki is then informed that Nish is trying to find her and the other women assure her that they won't let him hurt her.

They let Nish in and he confronts Suki and he pleads with her to take him back, but when Suki declines, Nish gets violent and tries to grab Suki and drag her away. The other women's attempts to intervene are futile until Denise strikes Nish over the head with a champagne bottle, causing him to collapse on the floor and be declared dead by Sharon. Immediately after, a distraught Keanu enters the pub to confront Sharon, but upon seeing the carnage, he insists taking Albie away from Sharon, under the impression that she killed Nish. When Sharon refuses to let him see Albie and reminds him that he is not Albie's father, Keanu becomes violent and tries strangling Sharon until Linda grabs a meat thermometer and stabs him in the back with it, instantly killing him, to the horror of the other women. Afterwards, Suki successfully resuscitates Nish, though he remains unconscious.

=== Aftermath of the murder ===
The women debate what to do, deciding to cover up Keanu's murder before calling an ambulance for Nish. They clean the blood, create a story involving Keanu attacking Nish before running away, and wrap Keanu's body in a rug before hiding it under the wreckage of the Bridge Street café after it was recently burned down by Kathy's newly married husband, Tom "Rocky" Cotton (Brian Conley) as part of an insurance scam. The Six women then make a pact, swearing not to tell anyone about the true events. The next day, Nish is placed into an induced coma and they recount their fabricated story to the police. Rocky becomes suspicious of Kathy and some of the other women as he had been drunkenly strolling around that night and saw them carrying a rug, despite Kathy insisting that it isn't true. To keep him quiet, Kathy reports Rocky for setting fire to the café and he is arrested and sentenced to 10 years in prison, annulling their marriage.

In early 2024, The Six become worried as builders have begun working on rebuilding the café, as well as that Nish has awoken from his coma. Needing a break, Sharon quietly leaves Walford with Albie to visit her best friend Michelle Fowler (Jenna Russell) in Australia. The stress causes Linda to relapse into her drinking problem and Denise develops depression. Nish admits that he doesn't remember anything that happened that night. The women decide that, to prevent the builders finding anything, to bury Keanu's body better, digging a deeper hole and covering it with cement. However, Denise loses her necklace in the process, causing her to become paranoid about being the only one with evidence on the body, leading her mental health to worsen even further as she starts seeing visions of Keanu staring at her.

Nish becomes healthy enough to be released from hospital, and is determined to figure out the truth of what happened that night. He intensely interrogates The Six, and while they don't reveal anything, they act suspiciously enough to cause him to blackmail Suki with going to the police for her businesses. After Nish tries interrogating Stacey, she is saved by Denise's husband Jack Branning (Scott Maslen). Once Nish is gone, Jack and Stacey continue their affair. Suki agrees to give Nish her businesses as long as he stops asking questions, which Nish agrees to. Later, Keanu's mother Karen Taylor (Lorraine Stanley) arrives to find out what happened to Keanu as she hasn't heard from him in months. Kathy tries calling the police on Karen for helping Keanu with Albie's kidnap, but is stopped by Karen's daughter Bernadette (Clair Norris), who later convinces her mother to leave for other reasons.

Denise gets sectioned due to her continuously worrying behaviour. Despite health professionals pressuring her, she is able to keep quiet about the murder and is released after a few weeks. At a barbecue held between the Fox and Slater families, Jack and Stacey's affair is discovered by Stacey's ex-husband Martin Fowler (James Bye), and he tells everyone about it. Denise breaks up with Jack and no longer trusts Stacey. Linda later confesses the murder to her son Johnny (Charlie Suff), who promises to protect her and helps find the weapon after it goes missing. Shortly after, Sharon and Albie return from Australia, with Sharon explaining that she had to get away because she loved Keanu and needed space, and that she cut contacts as she couldn't face it. After Sharon reassures Linda that she doesn't blame her, Linda catches Sharon up.

After the floor in the café caves in, causing a terrible smell, Denise worries about her necklace being down there, so Stacey offers to help her retrieve it. However, while they are doing so, Jack walks in. They come clean about the murder and, despite Jack being a police officer, he chooses to help as a way of proving his love to Denise. He retrieves the necklace without leaving fingerprints and Keanu's body is found later that night. The next day, Sharon is arrested due to the suspicious circumstances of her departure, but Johnny helps her through her interrogation and she is cleared by police. Linda concocts a plan to frame Dean Wicks (Matt Di Angelo) for the murder, both to get police to stop searching and as revenge for raping her 10 years prior. Stacey is sent to plant the weapon in his flat, while Linda makes a statement against him to police. Dean is arrested as a result.

Keanu's funeral rolls around, with Karen returning. During Karen's return, she visits Dean in prison, wanting answers to why he killed her son. Dean remains adamant that Linda framed him, and while Karen considers the possibility, she is convinced against it before returning to Spain. During Karen's visit, Callum Highway (Tony Clay) becomes suspicious of Linda and Sharon after noticing how they convinced Karen to stop searching. Callum voices his concerns to Jack, his boss, who tells him to stop searching. His suspicions were enough to rattle Sharon however, and her ex-husband Phil Mitchell (Steve McFadden) pressures her into confessing. Phil also swears not to say anything to the police as The Six include three of his children's mothers and Sharon's justification for not telling Phil, that Albie would be without parents if she got Phil involved.

Dean's trial begins in September 2024, with Sharon, Stacey, and Linda all called to give witness statements against him. On the first day of the trial, Stacey manages to put on an act to avoid tough questioning from Dean's lawyer, following advice from her adoptive grandmother Mo Harris (Lala Morse). Sharon is then pressured into discussing her past relationships by Dean's lawyer, who proceeds to slut-shame her in an attempt to catch her out. This prompts Sharon to confront both the lawyer and the judge. The judge subsequently holds Sharon in contempt of court and orders her to be taken into custody. As Linda enters to give evidence, she witnesses Sharon's arrest, she panics and flees after Sharon tells Linda that everything now rests on her.

Linda goes missing after fleeing the court and is later found to be staying in a hotel. Phil and Johnny attempt to locate her, with Phil texting Linda from Johnny's phone, falsely claiming that Ollie and Annie were involved in a car crash to lure her out, which succeeds. Meanwhile, it is revealed that Sharon has been sentenced to seven days in jail following her outburst in court. Linda returns to court to testify against Dean, and under false pretences, claims that she saw him drag Keanu's body across the square and into the café. When questioned about how the meat thermometer was found in Dean's flat, Dean asserts that the women planted it as revenge for raping Linda, which he then admits to the court, nearly ten years after the incident happened, leaving everyone in shock.

Later in the evening, The Six arrive at the Vic and discuss the repercussions of Dean's admission of rape. Kathy feels guilty for sending Dean down for the murder which leads to the women arguing, with all of them realising that their involvement in Keanu's murder will never go away. After they all leave, Linda returns downstairs and breaks down in the barrel store and calls Phil for help after she contemplates relapsing once more. Phil supports Linda as she continues to struggle, but warns her that she will never go back to her normal life again. After Phil leaves, Linda goes to the police station and confesses to killing Keanu to DCI Peter Arthurs (Ian Burfield), who is leading the case.

Linda claims that her alcoholism played a factor in her forgetting what happened at Christmas, but DCI Arthurs doesn't believe her and tells her to leave as the police have no evidence of Linda being directly associated with the murder. Linda returns to the Square and goes to the café to tell Bernadette. Bernadette strangles Linda, similar to how Keanu strangled Sharon, but stops herself and continues to break down and tell her that she needs to hand herself in, but Linda tells her that the police don't believe her. Phil's solicitor Ritchie Scott (Sian Webber) manages to tell Sharon that Linda tried to confess to the crime and she urges Ritchie to call the four other women. They all follow Suki as she goes to the café and see Linda talking with Bernadette. Kathy and the other three women tell Bernadette what happened on the night of Keanu's murder. Bernadette flees and goes to the Albert to call Karen and tells her that she would visit Keegan in Germany. Linda meets with Sharon in prison and tells her that she confessed as she says the truth would have came out eventually, like Dean's confession for her rape ten years prior. Sharon then returns to her cell for the night, unaware that her former step-mother Chrissie Watts (Tracy-Ann Oberman) is sitting in the cell next door.

During her time in prison, Sharon comes face to face with Chrissie, who has served 19 years of a life sentence for murdering Sharon's adoptive father, Den Watts (Leslie Grantham). Chrissie learns about Keanu and his murder, and blackmails Sharon into cancelling a meeting with the governor. Sharon had threatened to jeopardise Chrissie's parole hearing after Chrissie attempted to burn her with a kettle. Chrissie, in turn, warns Sharon that if she does not comply, she will ensure both Sharon and Linda are jailed for Keanu's murder. Meanwhile, Linda discovers that Dean has been sentenced to nine years in prison for raping her. Sharon ultimately cancels the meeting with the governor and makes amends with Chrissie before her release on parole. After being released, Chrissie reunites with Jake Moon (Joel Beckett), revealing that he is alive, and the two briefly visit Albert Square before leaving for good.

Linda tells her mother, Elaine Peacock (Harriet Thorpe), about the murder and the events of Christmas night. Elaine is left shocked and distances herself from Linda, prompting her to lash out for not stepping up to help her grandchildren if she goes to prison. Meanwhile, George Knight (Colin Salmon) is reunited with his brothers, Kobina (Jonathon Nyati) and Kojo Asare (Dayo Koleosho), who is autistic, as they arrive in Walford seeking answers about their father's murder. Kojo decides to stay, admitting he misses their mother. When Ollie accidentally breaks a tape of George's late mother singing, a gift from George's adoptive mother Gloria (Elizabeth Counsell), George gets upset. During this time, Elaine manages to repair the tape and has it digitised. George plays it for Kojo, and as Elaine listens in, she is encouraged by Johnny to comfort Linda, reassuring her that she will always stand by her.

In October 2024, DCI Arthurs gets in touch with the six women as well as Nish to be reinterviewed as part of the case. Suki gathers the women together to go through their statements but is interrupted by Nish who starts to suspect Kathy after she speaks aloud her frustration on the burden hiding the secret of Keanu's murder. At the police station, DCI Arthurs pressures Suki on how her finger prints ended up on the tarpaulin used by the women to cover up Keanu's body, Suki responds by using Eve as a diversion as a result of her working at the bap van. When Nish sees Kathy struggling after slipping up, he breaks in to her house and tricks Kathy into confessing that Linda killed Keanu. Nish leaves and heads to Suki and demands answers of what really happened on Christmas night surrounding Keanu's murder. Suki reveals that Denise hit him in the Vic on the night of the murder, and an angry Nish forces Suki to bring the six women together, with the exception of Sharon who was looking after Albie. Nish taunts Linda and Denise for their actions on Christmas night. After the other women leave, Suki tells Nish that she will spend the night with him in her bed in order not to tell the police of what he found out. Nish declines and emotionally abuses Suki into getting back together with him which shocks their family.

On Halloween, Nish forces Suki to stay home and watch a scary movie with him. When she manages to escape, Suki seeks refuge at the Minute Mart, where she speaks with Stacey before returning home. Upon her return, Nish begins to physically abuse her, but Stacey intervenes to stop him. After Nish leaves following a conversation with Avani Nandra-Hart (Aaliyah James), he forces the six women, including Suki, into the Vic. There, they recount the events of Christmas night, with Linda explaining where she stabbed Keanu. Believing Nish has called the police on them, Suki reveals that he actually reported himself to take the blame for the Christmas events after Avani intervened following Nish's attack on Suki. Nish tells the police that he threatened Linda's family and forced Linda to coerce a murder confession, but his account of events ultimately appear to clear all six women. As the women watch Nish being arrested and taken away, fireworks in the colours of the dresses the six women wore at Christmas light up the night sky.

When Bernadette returns from Germany in November 2024 after two months away, she confronts Linda and tells her that she is planning on going to the police. Linda relapses once again afterwards. Bernadette then confronts Suki where she threatens to tell her partner Eve (Heather Peace) about Suki's involvement in the cover-up of the murder. Bernadette's later confronts Sharon who tells her that the police won't believe her due to lack of evidence and that they want the case closed after arresting two men over the murder. Eve, after finding out that Suki and Nish received the blessing that Nish blackmailed Suki into doing, goes to the Vic and Bernadette tells her that Linda killed Keanu, and Suki helped cover it up. Eve later confronts Suki and questions what happened, and as a result, she vows to keep it secret but breaks up with Suki after leaving Eve in the dark about the murder, devastating her. After seeing Stacey, Bernadette confronts her and Stacey asks her how Karen would feel that she had known for months, leaving Bernadette speechless, which later leads to her having a change of heart, telling Kathy that she doesn't intend to tell the police, but demands to be promoted to manager and a get wage increase at the cafe, which Kathy swiftly agrees to in the hope they can mend their friendship.

In December 2024, Eve talks to Stacey who persuades her to forgive Suki after leaving her in the dark about her role in covering up Keanu's murder, which she does during the Christmas light switch on. Nish, in prison, learns that Suki and Eve plan to marry after phoning Nugget. As a result, Nish proceeds to conduct an escape plan to stop them from marrying, and manages to return to Walford, seeking revenge. Meanwhile, when Linda's alcoholism continues to spiral out of control, Bernadette sits with her in the cafe and forgives her for killing Keanu and tells Linda that she doesn't want to see her kill herself. When Linda has a vision of what would happen if she didn't stop drinking, which sees her dying from her alcoholism, leaving the rest of the six women feeling guilty, and Elaine being left alone, she decides to go to rehab. After finding out about Nish's escape from prison, Denise has a panic attack, fearing that he will come after her. She tells Ravi Gulati (Aaron Thiara) that she hit Nish on the head on Christmas night.

On New Year's Day 2025, Denise finds Nish hiding in one of the old flats on George Street whilst following Nugget, Nish whacks Denise on the head with a champagne bottle, mirroring what Denise did to him on Christmas night. Nish proceeds to head to the wedding and later poisons Eve and traps Suki in the honeymoon suite, intending on killing them both with poison too. Suki runs onto the balcony seeking help as Nish grabs Suki by her dress and confronts Ravi who he belittles and mocks him for having feelings for Denise. Nish dies after being pushed off the balcony by Ravi; Suki falls too but is cushioned by Nish and survives. Following these events, it left the six women in the clear as a result of Nish being convicted of Keanu's murder; upon her return in February 2025, Linda informs Denise she has forgiven herself for Keanu's murder and is ready to move on with the rest of her life.

In February 2025, Bernadette is unexpectedly named executor of the Panesars’ business accounts in Nish's will, part of his final act of revenge against Ravi, Suki and Vinny (Shiv Jalota). By June 2025, it is revealed that Bernadette has embezzled over £20,000 from the accounts, intending to use the money to move to Spain with her family. When Sharon's half-sister Vicki Fowler (Alice Haig) discovers this, she blackmails Bernadette into giving her half the money and reinstating her job, which Bernadette had previously terminated. Following the ordeal, Bernadette confides in Felix Baker (Matthew James Morrison), admitting she embezzled the money out of revenge for what happened to Keanu. She goes on to tell him that Linda was responsible for Keanu's death and that the other five women, including Suki, helped cover it up - complicating matters further as Felix is now dating Johnny. Vicki later informs Kathy about Bernadette's theft, prompting Kathy to alert Suki, who then shares the news with the rest of the Panesar family. When confronted, Bernadette retaliates by framing Vicki for the embezzlement.

When Ravi sets a trap for Vicki by locking Joel Marshall (Max Murray) in a freezer, he brings in both Vicki and Bernadette for questioning. Despite their denials, Ravi remains convinced that Bernadette is responsible. She manages to complete the money transfer and prepares to flee to Spain. Initially, she plans to leave without Felix, but after he sees Johnny and Callum kissing, a heartbroken Felix decides to go with her. Bernadette is later confronted by Suki, and she pleads with her to let them go, insisting that each of the six women have something they can to move on from following Keanu's murder. After persuasion from Linda, Kathy and Denise, Suki reluctantly agrees, allowing Bernadette and Felix to leave Walford and start a new life in Spain with their family.

== Reception ==
Laura Denby of Radio Times praised the flashforward scene, calling the decision "inventive and refreshing" and that "this brand new 'whodunnit' may have officially restored the long-running serial drama to its former glory". Nicole Vassell of The Independent reported that viewers had generally reacted favourably towards the scene, opining that: "It's giving Big Little Lies. It's giving "Cell Block Tango". It's perfect". Angie Quinn of MyLondon reported that fans were "gripped" following the airing of the flash-forward. Charlotte Tutton of Daily Mirror described the scene as "special" and "explosive". Stephen Patterson of Metro and Dan Seddon of Digital Spy called the flashforward scene "chilling". Patterson later remarked that the anticipation for the upcoming Christmas episode was higher than usual as a result of the flashforward, noting that "everyone has been talking about it". Stefania Sarrubba of Radio Times described the plotline as "Knives Out meets How to Get Away with Murder", considering it to be the show's "most ambitious storyline to date". Sue Haasler of Metro called The Six "the biggest whodunit in soap", adding that the flashforward scene was "special and genre-busting". Clenshaw noted that since the airing of the flashforward scene, "there has been an overwhelming amount of speculation around the body in question and which one of our six Walford matriarchs might be responsible". Lewis Knight of Radio Times commented that from the flashforward scene to December, the "highly anticipated storyline" had "everyone on the edges of their seats".

Despite underperforming in overnight ratings due to the late time slot of 9.45 pm, with viewership of 3.6 million, the 2023 Christmas episode eventually gained a consolidated total of 5.5 million (the soap's most watched episode of 2023) and received highly positive reviews from critics and audiences. Sophie Dainty and Kate Goodrace of Digital Spy called the episode "explosive". Lindsay and Patterson (Metro) said the episode "proved as eventful as [they had] hoped". Caroline Frost of iNews praised the storyline's "creative verve and ambition" and how the show "delivered the denouement of a 10-month narrative arc". Rose Hill and Ashleigh Rainbird of Mirror reported that fans considered the storyline "legendary". Knight (Radio Times) gave the episode a glowing review, commenting that "the entire outing truly sits among the very best of EastEnders Christmas episodes". Knight also praised the episode's performances, commenting that the actresses playing The Six gave "some of their best work in the show" and that "natural performer Danny Walters bows out in true style as Keanu succumbs to his worst impulses and loses his life in the process". He considered Keanu's death to be "A heartbreaking but logical conclusion to a character who started as a sweet hero and ended up a desperate villain no longer worthy of Walford icon Sharon Watts". He concluded that the show delivered an "absolute blinder with the Christmas story" and that "EastEnders delivered a true twist-filled piece of event television and showed soap at its finest".

Simon Coyle of Manchester Evening News reported that viewers hailed the episode as one of the greatest in the show's history, opining that "it's safe to say viewers were left in shock by the episode". Duncan Lindsay (Metro) commented that the episode "knocked the nation", praising the episode for its "impeccable" payoff and considering the storyline to be a "soap story for the ages". He added that "The Six storyline has been an intelligent and beautifully crafted soap arc from start to finish" and "Not only has the feverish thrill felt by us all carried us through ten months of eventful and packed episodes, the most impeccable Christmas Day episode has laid the groundwork and planted the bombs for a stunner of a 2024". He also complimented the episode as "one of the campest" in soap history, praising the "sublime" script and the performances. Simon Duke of Chronicle Live explained that Keanu's death scene "had fans on the edge of their seats". Mirror praised how the episode and storyline were "full of tension", "twists and turns", reporting "overjoyed" reactions from viewers. Jessica Clarke of OK! illuminated that the murder "floored" viewers. Hannah Verdier of The Guardian named the episode the fourth-best EastEnders Christmas episode of all time, writing that it solidly concluded a "mighty whodunit".

Throughout early 2024 focus began shifting away from The Six, which Tazmin Meyer of Entertainment Daily reported had disappointed fans, deeming the replacement storylines as "filler". The storyline won the award for the Soap Moment of the Year at the 2024 Radio Times Soap Awards.
