= Keanu Taylor =

Fictional character from EastEnders

- EastEnders character
- Portrayed by: Danny Walters
- Duration: 2017–2020, 2022–2024
- First appearance: Episode 5511; 15 June 2017
- Last appearance: Episode 6827 26 December 2023 (appearance); Episode 6860 20 February 2024 (hallucination)
- Created by: Daran Little
- Introduced by: Sean O'Connor (2017); Chris Clenshaw (2022)
In-universe information
- Other names: Keanu Floyd Taylor
- Occupation: Mechanic; Doorman
- Family: Taylor
- Father: Shane
- Mother: Karen Taylor
- Half-brothers: Keegan Baker; Riley Taylor; Chatham Taylor
- Half-sisters: Chantelle Atkins; Bernadette Taylor
- Daughters: Peggy Taylor
- Adoptive sons: Albie Watts (legal)
- Aunts: Kandice Taylor
- Nephews: Mackenzie Atkins; Roland Highway
- Nieces: Mia Atkins

Keanu Taylor is a fictional character from the BBC soap opera EastEnders, played by Danny Walters. He was created by EastEnders writer Daran Little and introduced by executive producer Sean O'Connor in episode 5511, broadcast on 15 June 2017. The character's first departure aired in episode 6084, broadcast on 21 February 2020. Keanu made an unannounced return in episode 6607, broadcast on 13 December 2022. His second and final departure in episode 6826, broadcast on 25 December 2023, saw the character be killed off. Following his on-screen death, Walters makes five additional appearances as Keanu between episodes 6837 to 6860, 10 January to 20 February 2024, appearing as a hallucination as part of Denise Fox's (Diane Parish) psychosis storyline. Keanu's storylines in the soap primarily revolved around his affair with Sharon Watts (Letitia Dean), and the resulting feuds from her husband Phil Mitchell (Steve McFadden), and Phil's children Ben (Harry Reid/Max Bowden) and Louise Mitchell (Tilly Keeper).

Upon the character's announcement, he was billed by O'Connor as being a positive, family-oriented man of morals. As his time on the serial continued, the character became more temperamental, and increasingly prone to outbursts and poor decision-making, with Walters noting that Keanu had the potential to be a dangerous person. In 2020, it was announced that Walters would make his first exit from the show to pursue other roles. In December 2022, Keanu was reintroduced by Chris Clenshaw in an unannounced return. Clenshaw said he decided to bring the character back due to Keanu having "unfinished business", and promised a matured version of the character. In February 2023, Keanu was listed one of seven potential victims for "The Six" storyline after it was revealed that a male character would die on the show's upcoming Christmas Day broadcast, eventually transpiring to be the victim, as he was stabbed to death by Linda Carter (Kellie Bright).

Across his run, the character received a mixed reception. Critics noted his initial lack of narrative relevance during his first stint, with some feeling the character had been underused. His affair with Sharon was considered controversial due to their large age gap, but several critics appreciated the drama that stemmed from it. His surprise return and eventual death scene garnered generally positive reactions. Walters won several awards and nominations for his portrayal of Keanu, including the award for the best "Newcomer" at the 23rd National Television Awards and the award for "Best Exit" award at the Radio Times Soap Awards.

== Development ==
=== Casting and introduction ===
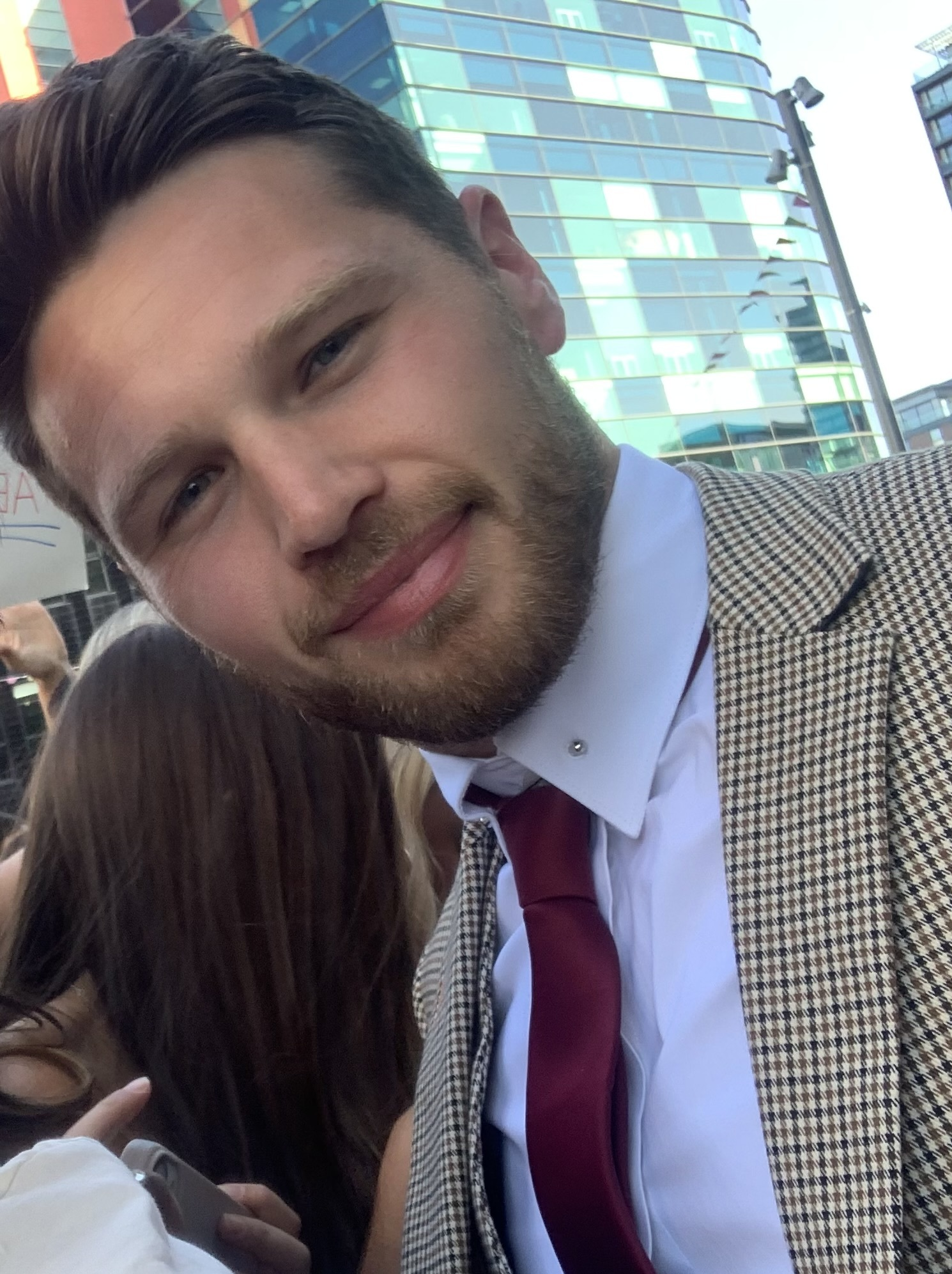
Danny Walters (pictured) plays Keanu Taylor.

In a Digital Spy interview, actor Danny Walters said he received the part of Keanu Taylor after attending a workshop organised by the show. He admitted he was uncertain if producers were considering creating a new family but knew they were casting and developing new characters. Later the same day, he was informed that he had been cast as Keanu, with details surrounding the character initially being kept vague. Walters was required to shave his head with clippers for the role, which he was initially unaware of, having expected only a light trim. Despite his surprise, the actor opined that the hairstyle change helped Keanu appear older and "more rugged". The show announced the Taylor family's arrival on 10 May 2017. The family was composed of Keanu, his mother Karen Taylor (Lorraine Stanley), and his siblings Bernadette (Clair Norris), Riley (Tom Jacobs), and Chatham (Alfie Jacobs). Before the announcement, Walters had to keep his casting a secret from friends and family.

A few weeks after beginning filming, Walters said he was welcomed by the cast and crew. Walters had Adam Woodyatt, who plays the long-running character Ian Beale, as a mentor on set. He commented on the "huge buzz" around the Taylor family's introduction and noted his excitement to see what was in store for the characters, promising Keanu would do everything in his power to maintain the peace in Albert Square. Walters found it easier to arrive as a part of a family unit, believing there would have been more pressure to succeed if his character had been introduced individually. The actor found himself being challenged by the fast-paced production of working on a soap opera, learning to prioritise his first take of a scene as the most important. Keanu, alongside the Taylor family, made their first appearance in episode 5511 of the soap, broadcast on 15 June 2017.

=== First departure ===
In September 2019, executive producer Kate Oates told the press that the secret of Keanu and Sharon's affair would be "blown up" during the soap's upcoming Christmas episode, with the storyline set to be a major plot point. In response, Walters teased "big emotions" and "big stunts" for the episode and that Keanu and Sharon's affair, which had been built up for a long time, would take an intense turn. Shortly afterwards, it was announced that Walters would leave the show to pursue other roles. Considering himself an "avid fan", Walters said that he had enjoyed playing Keanu and that the show would always "hold a special place in [his] heart". Executive producer Jon Sen said that Keanu's stint would conclude in a "dramatic and blistering" manner, with the truth set to come out in "spectacular fashion" and leave severe consequences.

The soap's final 2019 Christmas Day broadcast, episode 6048, saw Martin Fowler (James Bye) ordered to kill Keanu, with the episode finishing with a gunshot being heard from outside an abandoned warehouse, a cliffhanger that left Keanu's fate ambiguous. The show later revealed that Martin refused to kill Keanu and helped him fake his death, with Keanu exiting by leaving Walford in early January 2020. Both Keanu's falsified murder and his airport exit were leaked by the media before airing as the actor was seen filming on-set. Two weeks after his character's on-screen exit, Walters was seen filming for the soap's 35th anniversary episode on the River Thames.

Keanu would eventually return to EastEnders ahead of the 35th anniversary specials, with the intention to both run away with Sharon and get revenge. Walters teased that Keanu would target Ben Mitchell's (Max Bowden) boyfriend, Callum Highway (Tony Clay), because of Ben's role in organising Keanu's murder, comparing their feud to a game of chess: "It's essentially like a game of chess and to get to the King, which Keanu sees Ben as, he needs to go after the most precious thing to him, and that's Callum". Keanu goes on to hold Callum hostage. It was later confirmed by the soap that, as revenge, Ben, Phil, and Keanu would engage in a final showdown during the anniversary. Keanu's eventual involvement in the death of Sharon's son Dennis Rickman Jnr (Bleu Landau) prompts her to disown him, telling him to leave Walford. Keanu complies, leaving the show in episode 6084, broadcast on 21 February 2020.

=== Return ===
Over two years after Keanu's departure, in episode 6607, broadcast on 13 December 2022, Keanu made an unannounced return to Walford after having lived in Portugal. The show's typical practice of airing episodes early on BBC iPlayer before broadcasting them on BBC One was broken to conceal the return from spoilers. Explaining his decision to bring the character back, executive producer Chris Clenshaw said Keanu had "unfinished business" since his exit and had a lot of people to make amends with. Clenshaw added by noting the character's growth, explaining that Keanu had "matured" over time and, in his words, "left a boy and he returns as a man". Walters echoed this, detailing that Keanu had become "a new type of character" during his time away from Walford. Walters explained that Keanu's return was motivated by his newfound desire to be a good father figure for his son Albie Watts (Arthur Gentleman), to prove to himself that he was unlike his own violent father. Addressing Keanu's feelings for Sharon upon his return, the actor explained that she had always provided Keanu with "purpose" and "drive" as a result of their intense mutual romance.

When writing the character's return, the codename 'Neo' was used to refer to Keanu by the production team and Walters to prevent his return from being leaked, a reference to Keanu Reeves' character Neo from The Matrix. Talking about how the opportunity to return presented itself, Walters said in a Radio Times interview that he had been called by Clenshaw, who shared brief insights into upcoming storylines, which enticed Walters to return. Walters voiced his excitement about the planned developments for Keanu and was grateful to return at the end of a significant episode of the serial, the funeral of Dot Cotton (June Brown). Walters detailed his struggles to keep the return news a secret from friends and family.

=== Second departure ===
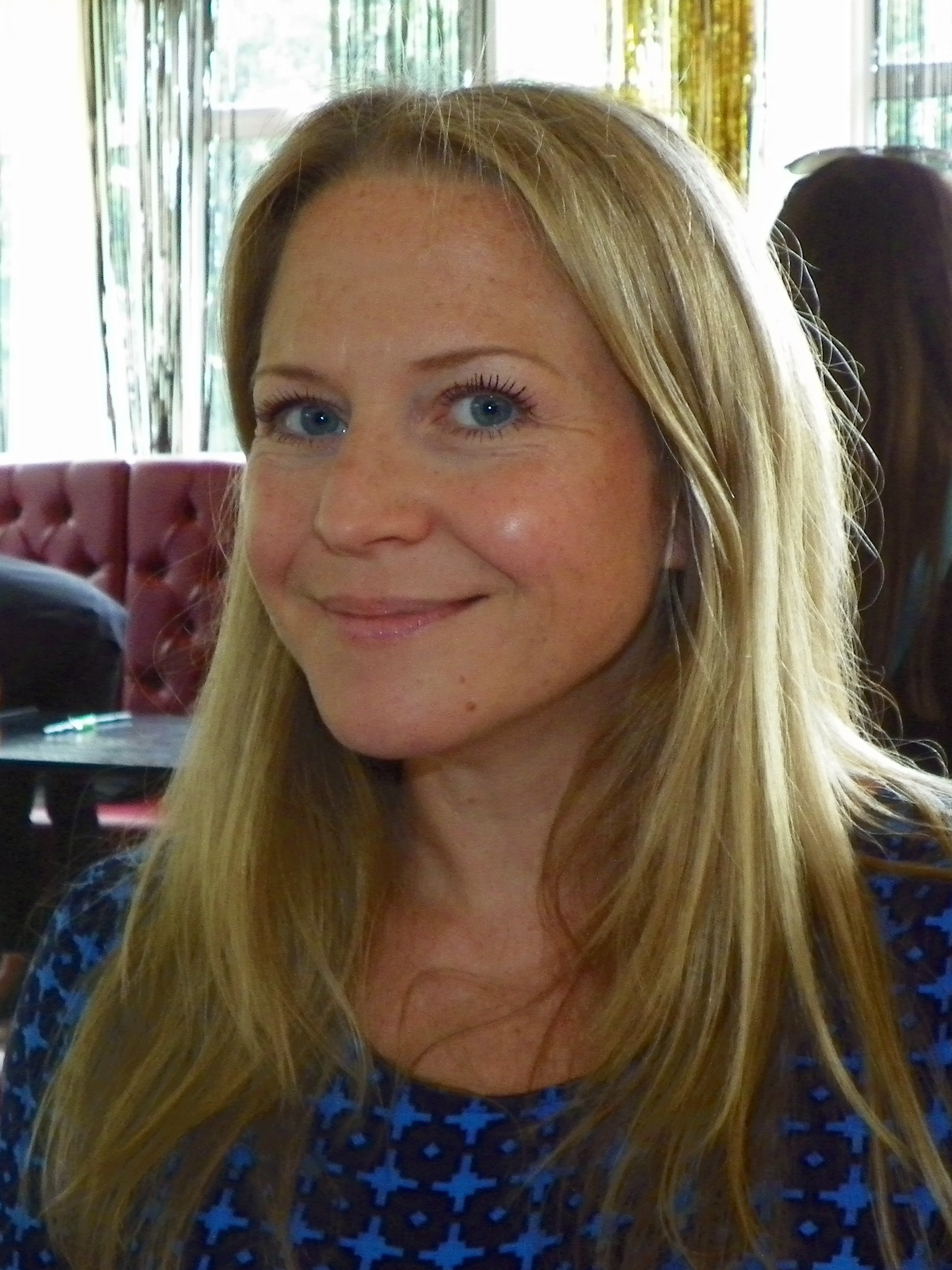
Keanu was murdered in The Queen Victoria pub by Linda Carter (Kellie Bright, pictured), making him the victim of "The Six" storyline.

After Clenshaw confirmed the soap's 20 February 2023 broadcast would leave viewers with "a lot of questions", it was revealed to be the show's first-ever flash-forward scene, showing six female characters – Sharon, Linda Carter (Kellie Bright), Denise Fox (Diane Parish), Kathy Cotton (Gillian Taylforth), Stacey Slater (Lacey Turner) and Suki Panesar (Balvinder Sopal) – standing over the body of an unidentified dead man in The Queen Victoria public house, with the only clues to his identity being his sex and the body wearing a black suit with amber cufflinks. The storyline became known as "The Six", in reference to the six female characters who were in the frame to be the murderer.

Keanu emerged as a prominent suspect for the identity of the dead body, as a result of his feud with Phil, his recent return, and his increasingly hostile behaviour. On 7 December 2023, he was confirmed as one of seven official suspects to be the dead body, alongside Phil, Dean Wicks (Matt Di Angelo), Jack Branning (Scott Maslen), Nish Panesar (Navin Chowdhry), Ravi Gulati (Aaron Thiara), and Tom "Rocky" Cotton (Brian Conley). Deemed a "late contender", he was considered one of the suspects because of his involvement in Albie's faked kidnapping, Sharon's secrets regarding Albie's paternity, and because Sharon was depicted wearing a wedding dress in the flash-forward, with later confirmation that she and Keanu would marry on Christmas Day. Keanu was briefly ruled out due to Walters being seen filming for the episode wearing a grey suit, not a black one like the body, and due to being less deserving of a brutal punishment than the other candidates. Ahead of the Christmas, Clenshaw teased to viewers: "As we head towards Christmas, it will become apparent and it will become very clear who the potential body is, not who the body actually is, but who the potential ones we're looking at are and the ones that it could be". He added: "Christmas Day in Walford is always momentous" and praised the fans' speculations.

Watched by 3.6 million people, "The Six" storyline unfolded on Christmas Day 2023, where it is revealed that while Keanu died after being stabbed by Linda Carter, he was not the body on the floor. Walters felt honoured to play the victim, and opened up about how challenging he found it to keep plot details under wraps "to have as much impact as possible". Reflecting of his time on the soap, he considered his favourite Keanu moment to be his arrival alongside the Taylor family. In a later interview, Walters detailed that when he initially returned, he had known that his character would be killed off. He noted that he struggled to keep the secret for the year, but succeeded. Discussing his character's development across his time on the serial, Walters stated: "The only thing that Keanu ever wanted was to be a dad and to have a son; as soon as that was taken away from him, his whole purpose and his character completely changed within a split second". He accredited Keanu's fear and insecurity over losing Albie as the reason for Keanu's out of character outburst. Walters was allowed to keep Keanu's work uniform as a souvenir.

=== Characterisation ===
Then-executive producer Sean O'Connor billed the family as being "noisy", "brash" and "not to be messed with". Keanu was originally described as being "charming" and "happy-go-lucky", while also seeing himself as "the man of the family", due to the lack of a father figure in the Taylor family, and making every effort to keep his siblings safe. Walters explained that Keanu was "mature for his age" as a result of his responsibilities in his family, and called the character morally upright and hard-working. He was later revealed to also be the family's breadwinner as Karen did not have a job. Talking about the Taylor family, Walters described them as prideful and "the sort of neighbours you wouldn't want moving into your beautiful Square", and said that they would clash with many of the show's characters. Despite their loud personalities, the actor teased that the family would display a heartwarming dynamic after a few months on the show. Keanu's unseen father Shane, who transpired to have been abusive towards Karen in the past, resulting in his prison sentence after stabbing her. On the ITV talk show This Morning, Walters revealed that his character didn't know much about his father, which meant he had to grow up quickly and become "the man of the house". Executive producer Kate Oates described Keanu as a "hard worker" and someone with a "strong moral compass".

Keanu's strong sentiment for his family is essential to his character. Walters said that Keanu suffered academically and wasn't intelligent, which he saw as a significant barrier to finding work. Nevertheless, in his early appearances, Keanu's primary objective was to earn money to support his financially struggling family. Walters detailed it was Keanu's "only motivation" and that it was something he often considered his character's objective while writing acting notes. The methods Keanu resorted to gain an income was noted by Digital Spy writer Claire Crick, who noted Keanu's "East End rough and ready manner". Her colleague Daniel Kilkelly wrote that Keanu was depicted as "moralistic". When asked about the soap's decision to introduce a working-class family, Walters responded that it was important to reflect society, and that it demonstrated the show's versatility. Walters noted Keanu's "protective" nature over his family, especially his mother Karen. The actor explained that "Keanu thinks a lot about what Karen says". Walters commented the family were initially disliked, but their "kind hearts" had begun to endear them to viewers. He credited a storyline showing Bernadette suffer a miscarriage as being the first instance of viewers beginning to enjoy the family due to the characters becoming more layered over the course of the story.

Despite Keanu's usually upbeat personality, the character was portrayed as having a sinister side. He has been called a "bad boy" and Walters noted Keanu could be a "dangerous man" at times. When asked about Keanu's darker characteristics, the actor explained that Keanu had an "edgy side", but it usually stemmed from his protectiveness over his family and loved ones. The show explored the character's aggressive temper throughout August 2018. He has been referred to as "troubled" and the show's "resident bad boy", but across his entire stint, Walters remained adamant that Keanu wasn't a bad person, rather a victim of his own poor decision-making and emotional responses to conflict. According to Walters, Keanu "wears his heart on his sleeve" and is "very driven" by it. Walters also found Keanu to be "very irrational" at times, failing to consider the wider scope of his actions.

=== Relationships ===
==== Sharon Watts ====
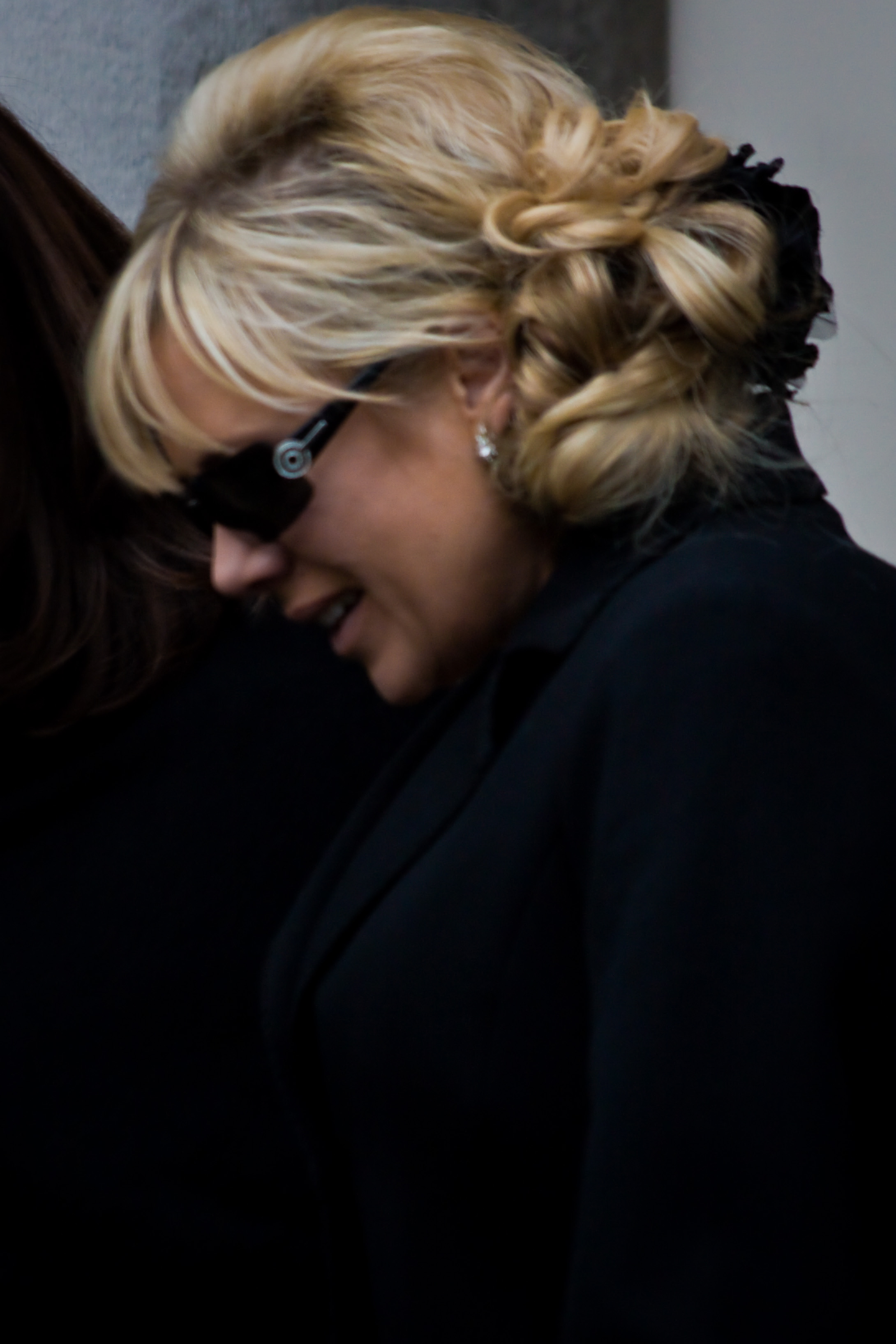
The affair between Keanu and Sharon Watts (Letitia Dean, pictured) was dubbed 'Sheanu' by viewers.

Keanu and Sharon first "team up" in April 2018, when Sharon helps him deal with a rude customer, Henry, (Andrew Alexander) at The Arches. In July, it was leaked that the characters would begin an affair storyline. The rumours were confirmed in an official teaser released by the show on 10 August 2018, which depicted Sharon admiring a shirtless Keanu and the pair sharing lengthy looks. The characters shared their first kiss in the episode originally broadcast on 31 August 2018. When asked about his initial reaction to the storyline, Walters said he was excited due to the story's scale with focus being entirely on Keanu and Sharon. The actor explained he first learned of the story when reading the script, but noted a journalist hinting it to him beforehand. Walters admitted he found filming scenes of the characters kissing "awkward", but enjoyed working with Dean. In a September 2018 interview, Walters teased that there would be "a lot more to discover" about Keanu and Sharon's relationship, deeming it an "interesting and fun" dynamic. The actor disclosed that there was no confirmed plan for the storyline's longevity during creation.

Despite the large age gap between Keanu and Sharon, Walters explained that Keanu was too smitten with Sharon to care about her age or the consequences if her husband Phil, "Walford's number one hardman", were to find out. Sharon was said to be "jealous" of Keanu's flirty friendship with Hayley Slater (Katie Jarvis). In October 2018, the characters' affair was threatened to be exposed as they received sinister texts from an unknown person. Walters attributed this to the expansion of the story over time: "the complications and the repercussions are getting much bigger". Walters opined that the characters were a good match for each other, but the heightened stakes continually blocked their relationship's progression. It was confirmed that Sharon would briefly end her affair with Keanu after the pressure became too high. When asked of Keanu's reaction, Walters responded that Keanu was "confused" by the direction of the relationship as he was receiving "mixed signals" from Sharon despite being "emotionally invested" in her. Keanu was left "heartbroken" when Sharon suddenly ended the affair due to Phil's return from time abroad.

They later became "on-off lovers", with Keanu being deemed Sharon's "teenage toyboy" by Digital Spy writer Laura Morgan. After the show announced its new executive producer, Kate Oates, she teased that Keanu and Sharon's story would remain a major plot across 2019. Despite leaving Keanu, Sharon was portrayed as being jealous when he moved onto her stepdaughter Louise Mitchell (Tilly Keeper). Keanu later cuts ties with her. Speaking to Inside Soap, Walters commented that Keanu's feelings for Sharon had become "more complicated" since his character began dating Louise, but was adamant that Keanu still had feelings for Sharon. After Keanu and Louise broke up, his affair with Sharon resumed. Shortly after it was confirmed Keanu had impregnated Louise, Sharon also fell pregnant. It was revealed that Keanu was the father of Sharon's baby, not Phil as she had initially hoped. Walters commented that the affair had been "bubbling for a long time" when it was announced that it would be exposed during Christmas Day 2019. The actor explained that Keanu was torn between Lousie and Sharon in the run-up to the Christmas celebrations. After the affair is exposed, Dean labelled it one of Sharon's "lowest points". Keanu exits for his first time after Sharon tells him she no longer cares for him.

Following Keanu's return, Walters said the prospect of beginning a relationship with Sharon, who had since divorced Phil, was part of Keanu's decision to return, considering her to be the reason Keanu had "a good purpose and a bit of drive". He further opined that Sharon was attracted to Keanu as he appreciated her. In an interview, the actor confirmed that Keanu had returned to create a family unit with Sharon for their son Albie (Arthur Gentleman). Sharon, however was more guarded and hesitant to resume the relationship, as she had been hurt before and feared being hurt again. Keanu, thus, aimed to "break down that barrier". Once it was confirmed that Keanu would propose to Sharon, only for her to initially decline, Walters explained that his character wanted to solidify their relationship through marriage, for their own interests as well as Albie's, as Keanu wanted to create a family with Sharon and Albie. In October 2023, Clenshaw opined that the couple weren't very good for each other outside of their affair, but Walters disagreed, saying there was a "deep love" between them despite their occasional disputes.

==== Phil Mitchell ====
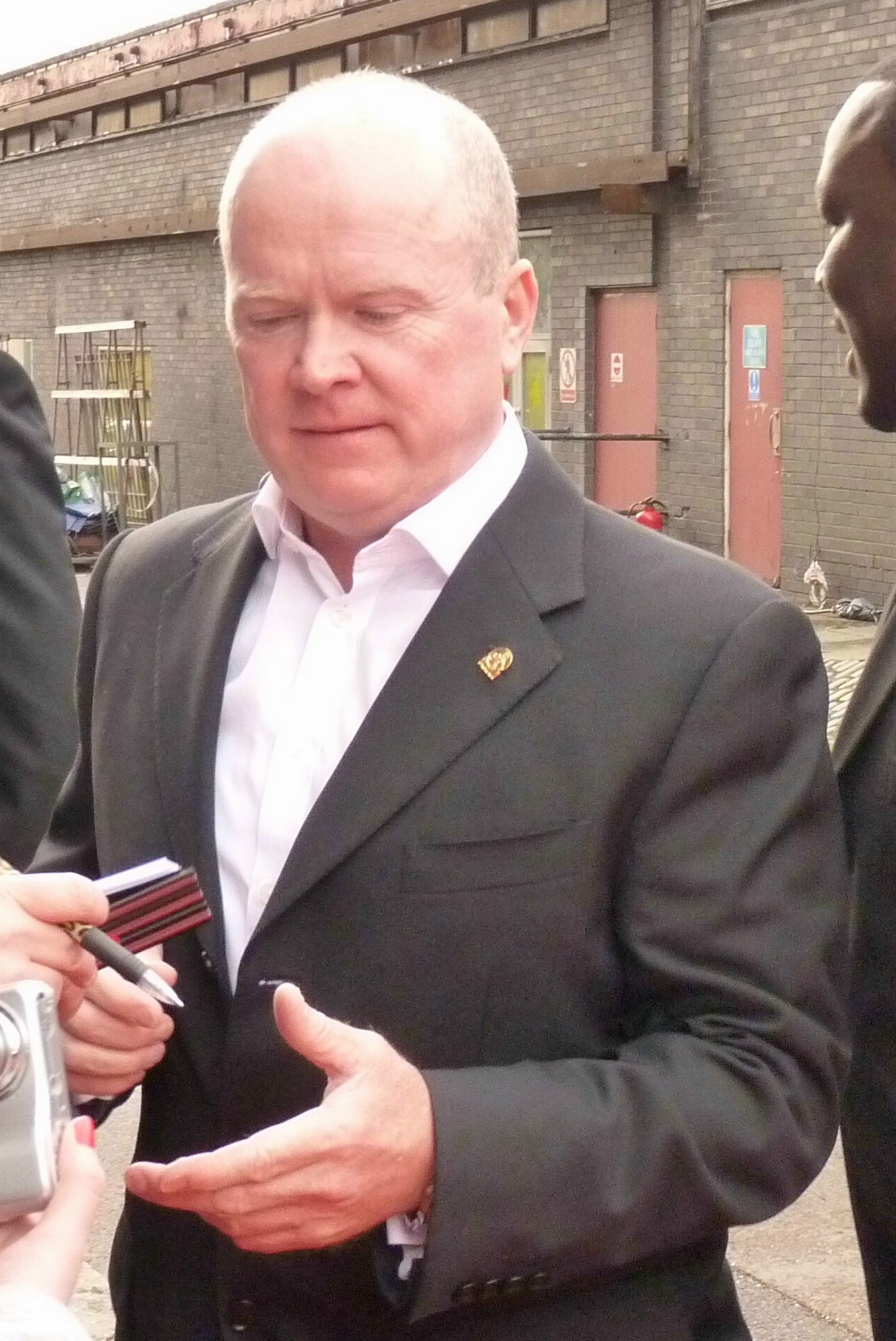
Phil Mitchell (Steve McFadden, pictured) was billed as Keanu's "long-time [enemy]" upon his return.

Following the heist, Walters commented that Keanu and Phil got to know each other during it, noting that Keanu had become particularly aware of Phil's short temper. In the aftermath, scenes showed Phil offering Keanu a job at The Arches, his mechanics. Walters explained that Keanu was grateful for the opportunity: "It's a relief for Keanu to have some sort of stability". He added that it helped Keanu gain a strong respect for Phil. Phil becomes "furious" with Keanu after learning that he and Sharon had taken revenge on a customer at The Arches. Later, once the show began a storyline about Sharon having an affair with Keanu behind Phil's back, it was said that the two had dreaded the prospect of Phil finding out.

When Oates overtook executive control of the serial, she teased that the affair storyline would take prominence throughout 2019. She said that Phil would become "complacent" with his life and marriage, and satisfied with the way "things seem to be falling in to place". She added that Phil and Keanu would become close, despite their opposing personalities. Oates concluded: "So as the storyline gets more complicated and messier, I think what is interesting is realising how far Phil is building up this affection for his family and the guy who works for him. And then just realising how further he will have to fall when he finds out the truth." Keanu becomes Phil's "lackey" throughout 2019, being deemed "everything Phil idolises".

Phil was set to find out about Keanu and Sharon's affair by Christmas 2019, with Walters commenting that Keanu was in great danger as a result, with Keanu knowing "exactly what Phil is capable of". After the show's Christmas Day 2019 broadcast aired, showing Phil enlisting Martin Fowler (James Bye) to kill Keanu after learning of the affair, though he is unable to go through with it, Dean explained that, deep down, Phil was "hurt" by the affair, and "wouldn't have let him get away with it". Phil had "treated like a son" before learning of the affair.

Following Keanu's return, Justin Harp of Digital Spy called Phil and Keanu "long-time enemies". Although Keanu's return took place while Phil was away, executive producer Chris Clenshaw teased viewers to expect "fireworks" once Phil returned, especially given their rivalry would strengthen after it was revealed that Keanu had had a fling with Phil's sister Sam Mitchell (Kim Medcalf) while away. Walters said that Keanu no longer feared Phil upon his return as he was too focused on his family, particularly Albie.

==== Louise Mitchell ====
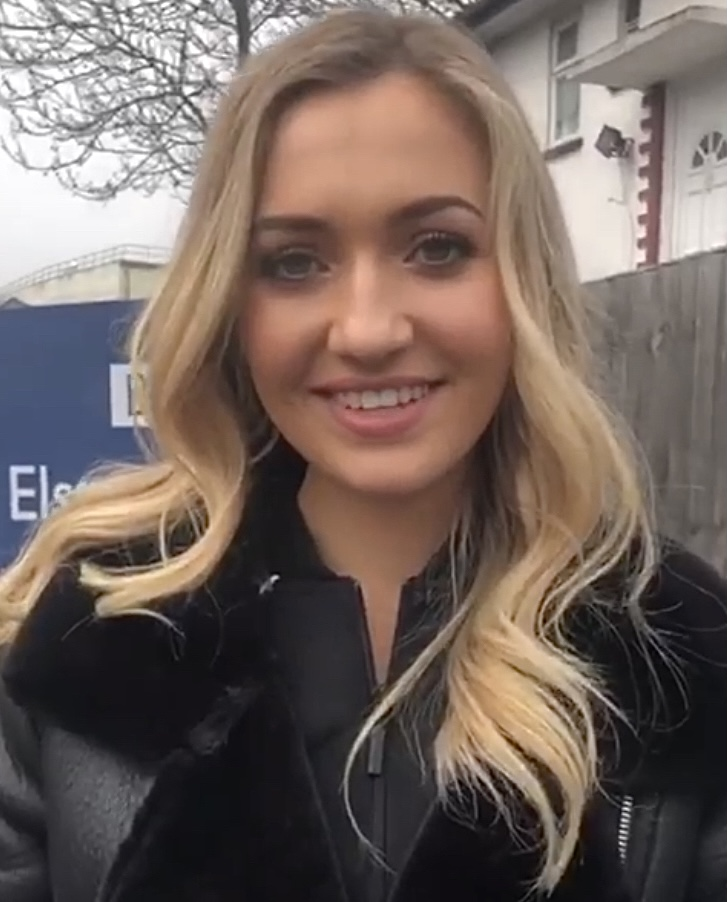
Keanu begins a relationship with Louise Mitchell (Tilly Keeper, pictured) during his affair with Sharon, her stepmother.

In December 2018, after Keanu's affair with Sharon ended, it was announced that the character share a kiss with Phil's daughter Louise Mitchell (Tilly Keeper), behind the back of her boyfriend and Keanu's brother Keegan Baker (Zack Morris). The characters were announced to be "drawn to each other when their separate romance problems collide". The fling was later confirmed to take place over the 2018 EastEnders Christmas broadcast and feature Louise attempting to kiss Keanu. Keanu and Louise began a relationship shortly afterwards, igniting jealousy in Keanu's ex-fling, and Louise's stepmother, Sharon Watts (Letitia Dean). Keanu's guilt prompts him to break up with Louise. However, once Keanu was sent to Spain by Sharon to complete a job, it was revealed that Louise was pregnant, with the father later confirmed to be Keanu.

After Keanu's return aired, Keeper explained that the pregnancy was a "shock" for Louise, and teased that there would be a future "curveball" thrown at Keanu and Louise's relationship. She added that Louise would turn to Sharon for advice, unaware of Keanu's affair with her. The actress added that Louise was invested in a relationship with Keanu, despite opining that they were poorly matched. Scenes later aired of Louise telling Keanu and he is left stunned by the revelation. While they plan on raising the child together, Louise breaks up with Keanu after discovering he was paid by Phil to begin dating her, despite having since "developed genuine feelings" for her. Regardless, she eventually chooses to keep the baby, leaving Keanu to think she had an abortion. The characters' "roller coaster romance" later continued as they got back together yet again following Louise confirming she lied about aborting the baby. Louise goes on to name their child Peggy, after her late grandmother Peggy Mitchell (Barbara Windsor). Walters considered Louise to be "perfect" for Keanu, and explained Keanu felt guilt over his affair.

When it was announced Louise would begin to grow suspicious of Keanu, Keeper reiterated that Louise was "in love" with Keanu, but was well aware that: "if you cross a Mitchell, there'll be consequences". The actress supported Louise's involvement in the attack on Keanu on Christmas Day because of his infidelity: "He'd betrayed her. She had to do something". She added that Louise would exit shortly after.

==== Ben Mitchell ====
Early on, Keanu was framed as a possible love interest for Ben Mitchell (Harry Reid), only for it to later be revealed that it wasn't the case as Ben was set to leave the show soon after. Responding to fan speculations that shipped the characters, Walters admitted surprise. He remarked that the ship name 'Beanu' sounded like an "exotic fruit". The actor added that a romantic relationship between Keanu and Ben was never "on the cards", and that Keanu's first love interest was always set to be Ingrid Solberg (Pernille Broch).

Later, Keanu is left "reeling" after learning Ben (now Max Bowden) had involvement in human trafficking, blackmailing Keanu to also become involved. It was said Keanu had been "stunned" by Ben's "mercenary streak" in comparison to their earlier interactions. Ben attempts to drive Keanu and Louise apart. Following Stacey Slater's (Lacey Turner) attack against Phil, Ben attempts to frame "arch-enemy" Keanu for the crime. Explaining why Ben framed Keanu, Bowden said that Ben was jealous of Keanu's relationship with Phil and status as the new "Mitchell son", and being an image of Phil's ideal son, so wanted him out of the picture. He explained that Ben had never had a strong relationship with Phil and felt "replaced" and "inferior", so wanted rid of Keanu. When asked if Ben felt guilt over falsely incriminating Keanu, Bowden explained that Ben believed it was better for Louise's unborn baby to have Ben as a father figure over Keanu. Keanu returned after Ben's involvement in his hit, as he was "hellbent" on revenge against him for being part of the plot.

==== Other characters ====
Keanu met his first love interest on the show, Ingrid Solberg (Pernille Broch), while working as a life model at an art class she attended. Deemed a "budding romance", it was threatened when Keanu began toying with the idea of working for an escort agency. In December 2017, Walters said that Keanu and Ingrid had a "sweet relationship" that was "still brewing". He later commented that the relationship had begun to strain as a result of Keanu's other responsibilities and financial pressures. Much of the characters' romance was kept off-screen as it was gradually written out. In May 2018, it was announced that Ingrid would depart from the soap, marking the end of her relationship with Keanu.

After Keanu was "lured" into a heist by Aidan Maguire (Patrick Bergin), Walters teased that it would allow viewers to see a "different side" to Keanu. He explained that within the Taylor household, Keanu has a defined role and status. However, compared to the other men on the heist, he becomes vulnerable and shows fear towards the dangers. The actor admitted that it was a bad decision for Keanu, but that the character gets "in too deep". Despite the heist's ultimate failure, the show later announced that Keanu would be "roped back" into Aidan's antics.

Although Hayley Slater (Katie Jarvis) had been "vying for Keanu's attention" throughout August 2018, she found herself on the receiving end of Keanu's temper. After apologising, Keanu's mood was lifted by positive words from Hayley. Later in the year, Keanu almost killed a pregnant Hayley during a violent outburst where he threw a spanner in her direction. Keanu tried desperately to apologise and they made up before Hayley witnessed more violence from Keanu when he pushed Cody (Jacob Avery) into a pit, prompting Hayley to tell Keanu he had to learn to control his anger. A later scene between the pair depicted Hayley's attempts to kiss Keanu, but he turns her down, sensing her vulnerable state of mind. Hayley had "grown fond" of Keanu over their friendship.

The show announced in May 2019 that the character Lisa Fowler (Lucy Benjamin) would return to the show. As the mother of Louise, it was teased she would return following the announcement of Louise's pregnancy to "keep a close eye on her daughter". When it was confirmed that Lisa would return for a stint following her exit, she brought Peggy back to the square with her, to Keanu's delight. However, Lisa demands that Keanu support her financially in turn to spend time with Peggy. In an appearance on the ITV talk show Lorraine, Walters teased Lisa's arrival would disturb Keanu's happiness. Discussing Lisa's plans, Walters noted that she becomes "greedy" and asks for overly large sums of money from Keanu, manipulating him using his love for Peggy.

Walters said Keanu had always wanted to be a father and valued family, so prioritised his children. When Keanu returned in 2022, Walters cited a primary reason as to why being that Keanu wanted to look after Peggy and Albie (Arthur Gentleman), his children. As Peggy had since departed, Walters said he wanted to create an "impression" in Albie's upbringing. Explaining, he detailed that Keanu wanted to be a decent father figure to his children as a result of his own difficult upbringing: "He's not had a father figure in his life and the way I've always played it is to be the dad that his dad wasn't". Te actor later clarified Keanu wanted to create a family unit with Sharon for Albie. Despite Peggy being separated from Keanu for her entire life, Walters said Keanu still held a deep bond with her. Walters commented that Lisa was easily able to exploit Keanu's emotions for money as he was "emotionally hooked" on Peggy. The show eventually revealed that Albie was not Keanu's son, and was biologically Phil's.

Despite being "worlds apart in terms of their age and characteristics", Keanu begins a friendship with Reiss Colwell (Jonny Freeman) after Reiss joins business with him. Walters explained that while they wouldn't spend extended amounts of time together, Keanu slowly begins to "warm" to him. Keanu later turns to Reiss for financial help when being charged by Lisa to spend time with Peggy.

== Storylines ==
=== 2017–2020 ===
Keanu as he appeared in 2017.

Keanu moves to Albert Square with his family and takes on various jobs to support them, including nude life modelling for an art class and working for an escort agency and begins a romance with Ingrid Solberg (Pernille Broch), though this ends when she leaves the Square. Keanu is soon recruited by Aidan Maguire (Patrick Bergin) to help with a robbery. Although the robbery fails, as a reward for his efforts, Phil Mitchell (Steve McFadden) hires Keanu as a mechanic at The Arches, where he clashes with Mitch Baker (Roger Griffiths), his mother Karen Taylor's (Lorraine Stanley) ex and the father of his half siblings. After being fired by Phil following a disagreement, Keanu later steps in to protect Sharon Mitchell's (Letitia Dean) son Dennis (Bleu Landau) from a gang. He earns Sharon's gratitude, and they begin a secret affair. Sharon's husband Phil later encourages Keanu to date his daughter Louise Mitchell (Tilly Keeper), who soon becomes pregnant from Keanu. Shortly after, Sharon discovers she is also pregnant by Keanu, though she hides the truth by claiming the baby is Phil's.

Phil eventually uncovers Sharon and Keanu's affair, leading to a Christmas Eve plot to have Keanu killed. Martin Fowler (James Bye), tasked with the job, stages a fake execution with Linda Carter's (Kellie Bright) help, allowing Keanu to escape. Keanu later returns, seeking to reunite with Sharon and leave Walford, but his plans unravel when he kidnaps Phil's son Ben Mitchell's (Max Bowden) boyfriend Callum Highway (Tony Clay) to secure ransom money for their escape. This results in a confrontation with Phil, who beats Keanu before a disastrous boat crash claims Dennis's life. Overcome with grief and blaming Keanu for her son's death, Sharon ends their relationship and demands he leave Walford for good.

=== 2022–2023 ===
Keanu returns to Walford two years later, determined to reconnect with his son Albie (Arthur Gentleman), but his efforts receive resistance from Sharon and threats from Phil. While feigning allegiance to DI Samantha Keeble (Alison Newman) to help Phil dismantle her vendetta, Keanu's past affair with Phil's sister Sam (Kim Medcalf) comes to light, prompting Phil to order that he leave Walford. After Keanu aids in thwarting Keeble's revenge plot, he negotiates his way back into the Square. He rekindles his relationship with Sharon, and they get engaged. Financial pressures push Keanu into doing criminal activities with Ravi Gulati (Aaron Thiara), but he gets caught while supplying marijuana and is arrested. Sharon soon bails him out. Lisa Fowler (Lucy Benjamin) returns with Keanu and Louise's daughter, Peggy Taylor, revealing that Louise has been struggling with addiction issues and blackmails Keanu by allowing him to see Peggy in exchange for money.

When his relationship with Sharon begins to strain, and in a desperate bid to assert his parental rights, Keanu and Karen kidnap Albie and stage a ransom demand, though Albie is ultimately returned unharmed. The truth behind the abduction is uncovered, and Karen takes the blame to shield her son. However, Phil demands repayment for the ransom money, deepening Keanu's financial troubles. On Christmas Day 2023, his half sister Bernadette (Clair Norris) reveals Keanu's role in the kidnapping, disrupting his wedding to Sharon. In the ensuing confrontation, Sharon stuns everyone by revealing that Albie is actually Phil's son. Later, in The Queen Victoria, an enraged Keanu becomes violent and attempts to strangle Sharon, only to be fatally stabbed with a meat thermometer by Linda during the altercation. The women involved – Sharon, Linda, Denise Fox (Diane Parish), Kathy Cotton (Gillian Taylforth), Stacey Slater (Lacey Turner), and Suki Panesar (Balvinder Sopal) – decide to hide Keanu's body under the floorboards of the Bridge Street Café. While her mental health declines, Denise envisions Keanu staring at her before his body is discovered four months later by Bernadette. Karen returns for his funeral and visits Dean Wicks (Matt Di Angelo) in prison, who has been framed by the women for Keanu's murder. Later, Suki's abusive ex-husband, Nish Panesar (Navin Chowdhry) falsely confesses to Keanu's murder. Although he is incarcerated for the crime, he escapes prison, but is killed by Ravi on New Year's Day 2025.

== Reception ==
=== Awards and nominations ===
Danny Walters received several award nominations for his portrayal of Keanu. At the 2017 Inside Soap Awards, he was nominated for "Best Newcomer" and "Sexiest Male". In 2018, Walters won the award for best "Newcomer" at the 23rd National Television Awards. In 2019, he was nominated for "Best Actor" at the British Soap Awards. In 2024, Walters won the "Best Exit" award at the Radio Times Soap Awards.

=== Critical response ===
Prior to his introduction, BBC News praised Keanu's name. A controversial early storyline which falsely framed Keanu as the father of Bernadette's unborn baby was heavily criticised by viewers, with some accusing the soap's incest indication being "too far". Many expressed relief upon the revelation that Keanu was not the father. In September 2017, Laura Morgan of Digital Spy opined that Keanu's character was in need of a relationship or an affair to help him stand out and to improve the Taylor family's narrative relevance. She later echoed the sentiment in May 2018, again expressing frustration in Keanu's lack of narrative relevance, writing: "With a Hollywood name like Keanu, Karen's lad should be one of the biggest stars of the show". According to Digital Spy writer Daniel Kilkelly, after their first scene together aired, speculations of Keanu's potential romance with Ben "sent Twitter into overdrive". In August 2018, Claire Crick of Digital Spy opined that Walters had Keanu's mannerisms and personality "down to perfection". A scene showing Keanu almost killing Hayley was called "shocking" and "disturbing" by Justin Harp of Digital Spy, writing that the character's anger issues had "gone too far". In 2023, Laura-Jayne Tyler from Inside Soap praised Keanu's looks, writing, "Who needs Channing Tatum when we have Keanu? We're off for a lie down".

Stephanie Chase of Digital Spy remarked that "fans were not ready" for Keanu and Sharon's affair to begin, noting that its introduction received a mixed response from viewers. Her colleague Joe Anderton reported that scenes of the characters kissing had attracted controversy, but joked that "EastEnders has been taking a page out of the 'Adam Rickitt Book of Getting Women and The Gays to Watch Your Soap' lately with Keanu Taylor", in reference to the character's frequent shirtless scenes. The affair's impact has been noted on several occasions, as it was deemed "one of EastEnders' biggest storylines", as well as one of the show's "most mouth-watering" and "the affair to end all affairs". It was credited by Sophie Dainty of Digital Spy as one of seven reasons why the Taylor family became more popular with viewers after a mixed initial response. Grace Morris of What's on TV said that Keanu had "went down in EastEnders history" as a result of the affair. Daniel Kilkelly of Digital Spy was surprised about how long it took for Keanu and Sharon's affair to be exposed, calling it "one of the best kept secrets on the Square". Keanu's airport exit was named "gripping" and "emotional" by fellow Digital Spy writer Justin Harp.

Morris (What's on TV) deemed the character's return "epic" and "highly-anticipated", considering Walters an "EastEnders favourite". Stefania Sarrubba of Radio Times agreed that she was surprised by Keanu's return, and praised his reunion with Karen and Bernadette as "touching". Keanu's return was ranked as the fifth-best storyline in a British soap opera in 2022 by Radio Times. Writer Helen Daly wrote that it succeeded due to the element of surprise, Keanu being a "beloved" character, and the storyline potential his return brought. She concluded: "the EastEnders gods delivered". What's on TV writer Rachel Lucas said that Keanu's decision to stage Albie's abduction was an act of "petty revenge". Helen Daly of Radio Times called Keanu's character "loveable". Lewis Knight of Radio Times called the character a "favourite" and following his death, called Walters's performance "natural" and wrote that Keanu "succumbs to his worst impulses and loses his life in the process. A heartbreaking but logical conclusion to a character who started as a sweet hero and ended up a desperate villain no longer worthy of Walford icon Sharon Watts". Radio Times writers Morgan Cormack and Katelyn Mensah deemed Keanu's exit "suitably dramatic". Scenes airing after Keanu's murder depicting Denise hallucinating visions of promoted "terrif[ied]" reactions from viewers on Twitter.
