= Danny Walters (actor) =

English actor (born 1993)

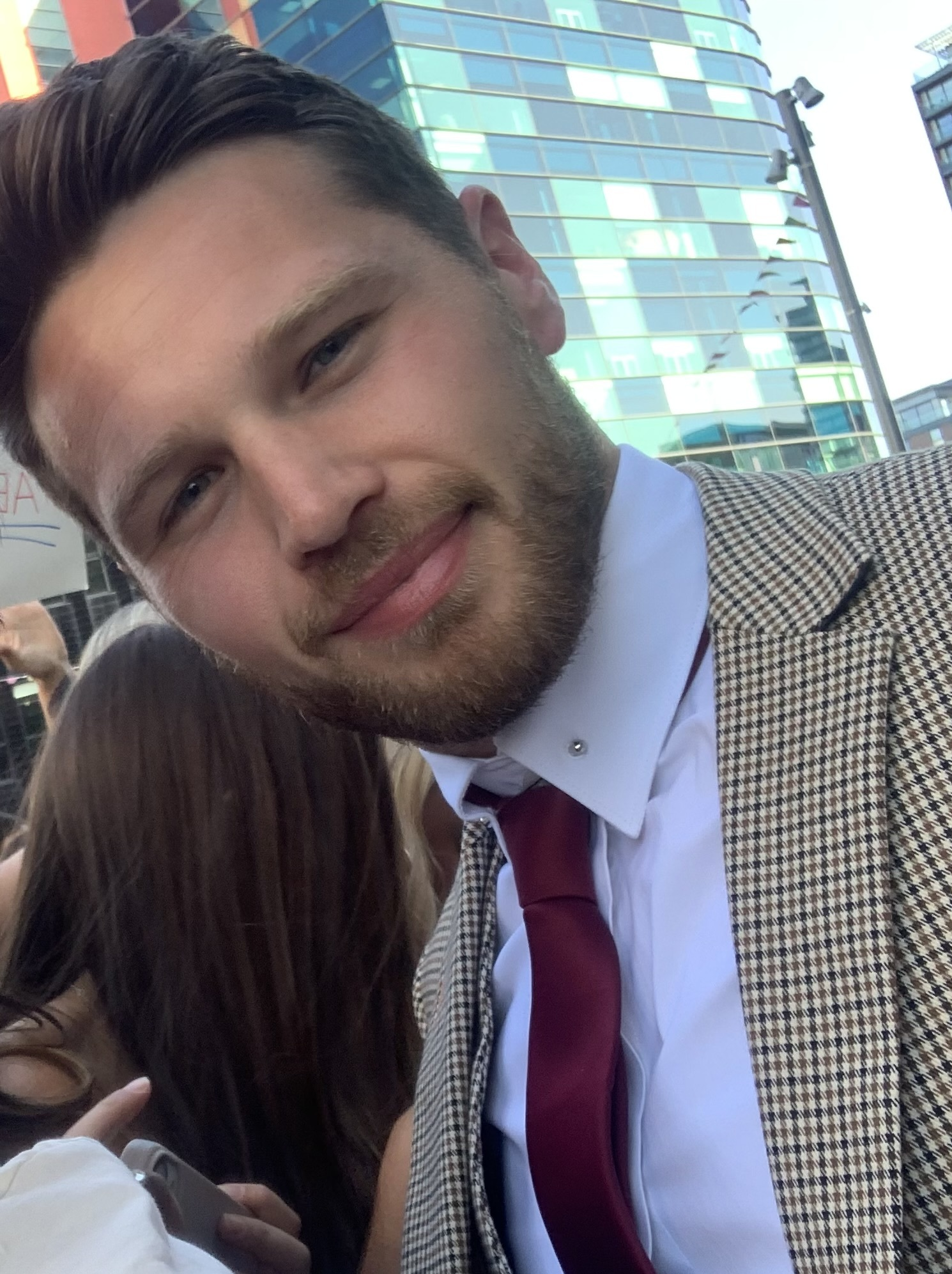
- Walters in 2023
- Born: 1 June 1993 (age 33); Harlow, England
- Education: London School of Musical Theatre
- Occupation: Actor
- Years active: 2012–present
- Height: 5 ft 10 in (1.78 m)
- Partner: Maddi Faircloth (2021–present)
- Children: 1

Danny Walters (born 1 June 1993) is an English actor, known for his roles as Tiger Dyke in the ITV sitcom Benidorm (2014–2017) and Keanu Taylor in the BBC soap opera EastEnders (2017–2020, 2022–2024).

== Career ==
From 2014 to 2017, Walters played Tiger Dyke in the ITV sitcom Benidorm. He also made guest appearances in the BAFTA-nominated BBC miniseries Our World War and the BBC series Call the Midwife in 2014 and 2016. During Christmas 2016, he took the title role of Jack in the pantomime Jack and the Beanstalk at the Billingham Forum Theatre.

In May 2017, it was announced that he would be appearing in the BBC soap opera EastEnders, portraying Keanu Taylor. Before being cast as Taylor, he auditioned for the role of Brody Hudson in Hollyoaks. He left the soap in November 2019, and his final scenes aired on 21 February 2020. Walters made an unannounced return to the show on 13 December 2022 and departed again on 25 December 2023, when his character was killed off.

== Personal life ==
Walters grew up in Harlow, Essex, and moved to Stansted near the Hertfordshire border during his childhood. He originally wanted to be a footballer, but was not athletic enough at the time, so was convinced by his mother to try acting classes at a drama school. Although he initially disliked the classes, he began enjoying acting after making friends with classmates and portraying Fat Sam in a production of Bugsy Malone.

Walters has been in a relationship with Maddi Faircloth since 2021. In March 2025, their first child, a daughter, was born. In September 2026, Walters announced his engagement to Faircloth.

== Filmography ==
=== Film ===
Year	Title	Role	Notes
2012	Broken Hearts	Carl Lucas	

=== Television ===
Year	Title	Role	Notes
2014–2017	Benidorm	Tiger Dyke	30 episodes
2014	Our World War	Mike Weston	1 episode
2016	Call the Midwife	Leslie Matlin	Series 5, episode 7
2017	Children in Need	Chimney Sweep	Children in Need 2017
2017–2020, 2022–2024	EastEnders	Keanu Taylor	402 episodes

== Awards and nominations ==
Year	Award	Category	Work	Result	Ref.
2017	Inside Soap Awards	Best Newcomer	EastEnders	Nominated	
2017	Inside Soap Awards	Sexiest Male	EastEnders	Nominated	
2018	23rd National Television Awards	Newcomer	EastEnders	Won	
2018	I Talk Telly Awards	Best Soap Performance	EastEnders	Nominated	
2019	2019 British Soap Awards	Best Actor	EastEnders	Nominated	
2019	I Talk Telly Awards	Best Soap Performance	EastEnders	Nominated	
2024	RadioTimes.com Soap Awards	Best Exit	EastEnders	Won	
