= Callum Highway =

Fictional character from EastEnders

- EastEnders character
- Portrayed by: Tony Clay
- Duration: 2018–present
- First appearance: Episode 5628/5629; 1 January 2018
- Introduced by: John Yorke
In-universe information
- Occupation: Army caterer; Barman; Undertaker; Police officer
- Father: Jonno Highway
- Brothers: Stuart Highway
- Husband: Ben Mitchell (2021–present)
- Stepdaughters: Lexi Pearce
- Grandfathers: Freddie Highway
- Grandmothers: Vi Highway
- Uncles: Christopher
- Nephews: Roland Highway
- Nieces: Zara Highway

Callum Highway (also known as Halfway) is a fictional character from the BBC soap opera EastEnders, played by Tony Clay. He was introduced in the episode first broadcast in the United Kingdom on 1 January 2018. Callum is introduced as a friend of the established Carter family, which was not publicised beforehand. Callum was originally a comedic character who was jovial, dopey and "happy-go-lucky" and who wore shabby clothing and beanie hats. Callum's initial stint on the show focuses on his relationship with the Carter family and establishing a relationship with Whitney Dean (Shona McGarty).

The actor was only contracted for two months and Callum departs in the episode first broadcast in the United Kingdom on 16 February 2018. Afterwards, Clay was invited back to reprise his role and Callum returns two months later after serving in the army. His experience in the army and his relationship with Whitney are explored upon his return. He later breaks up with Whitney and forms a relationship with Ben Mitchell (Max Bowden), whom he later marries. Producers introduced Callum's brother, Stuart Highway (Ricky Champ); their relationship is initially portrayed as dark, but later becomes supportive. Clay's portrayal of Callum has received a positive response from critics, with a Soaplife columnist describing him as "a welcome ray of sunshine in the bleak world of Albert Square", and Laura-Jayne Tyler of Inside Soap opining, "Square chiefs had clearly found a diamond in the rough with actor Tony Clay".

== Creation and development ==
=== Casting and introduction ===
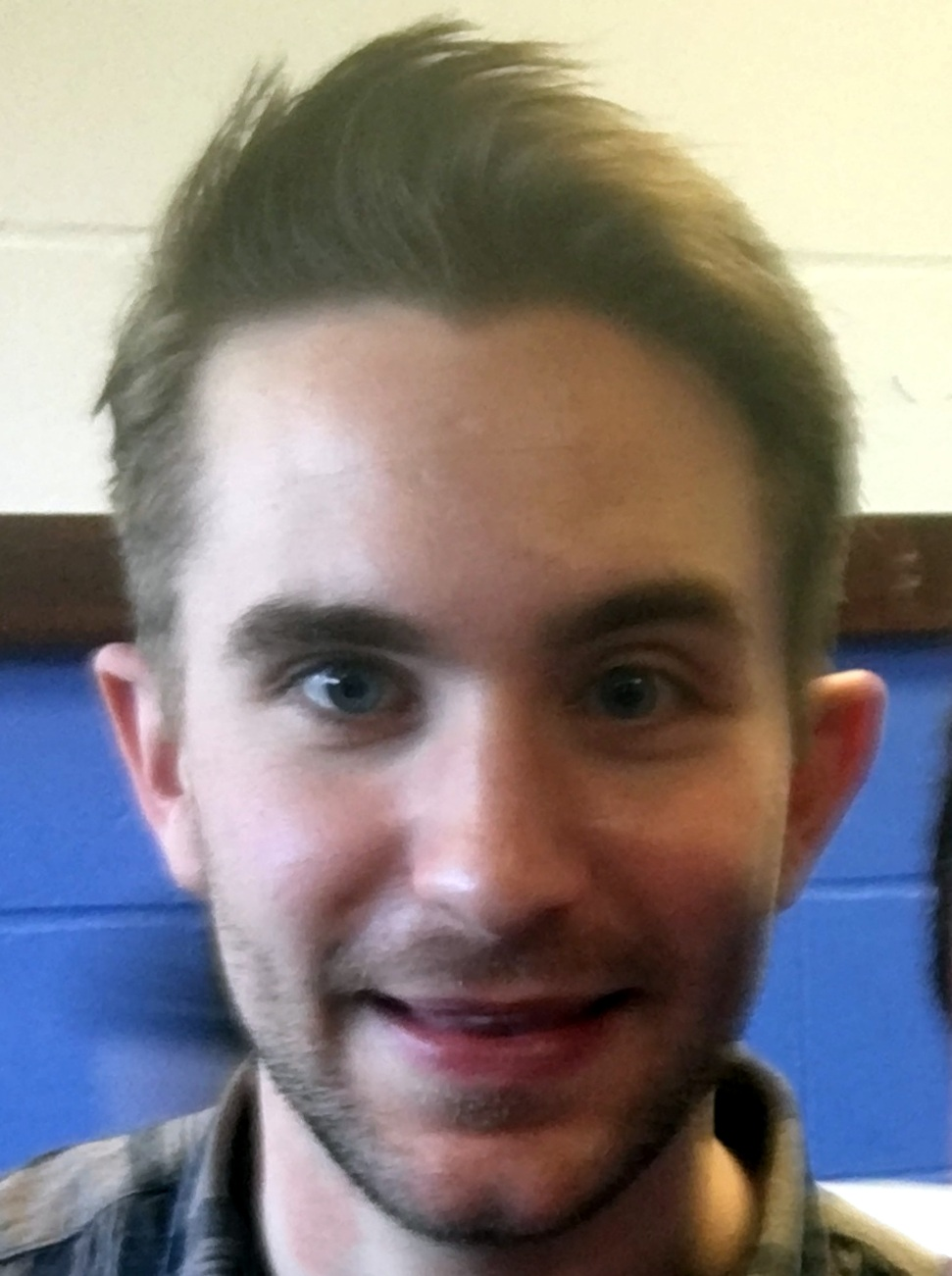
Tony Clay (pictured) portrays Callum.

Actor Tony Clay was cast in the role of Callum "Halfway" Highway on a two-month contract. The character's introduction was not publicised in the media and he made his first appearance in the episode broadcast in the United Kingdom on 1 January 2018. Following his first episode, in which established character Mick Carter (Danny Dyer) is shot by Callum, it was suggested by Joe Anderton from Digital Spy that Mick would know his shooter. When viewers suggested that the shooter could be Mick's son Lee Carter, with the role recast from actor Danny Hatchard to Clay, David Brown of the Radio Times doubted that this would be true. In his second episode, Callum was confirmed to be the shooter and Lee's friend. Clay agreed with Daniel Kilkelly of Digital Spy that it was risky for Callum to shoot Mick in his first episode.

It was not confirmed whether Callum would be a regular character. However, executive consultant John Yorke had announced in December 2017 that a new friend for Mick and a new interest for Whitney Dean (Shona McGarty) would be introduced in 2018. Kilkelly (Digital Spy) wondered whether Callum could be the aforementioned friend of Mick and love interest for Whitney. When asked whether he found joining EastEnders "daunting", Clay replied, "Yes and no" and stated that although he found it surreal to work with Steve McFadden, who portrays Phil Mitchell, his nerves settled quickly. Callum departs in the episode broadcast in the United Kingdom on 16 February 2018, signalling the conclusion of Clay's contract. Claire Crick of Digital Spy pointed out that Callum was a plot device introduced only to support the Carter family's storylines, especially when Callum is revealed to be in ownership of an expensive ring, which he lets the Carters sell when they need money to save their home, a plot that Crick thought was "convenient".

=== Reintroduction ===
After the end of his original contract, Clay received a phone call from producers asking him to reprise the role. He thought that because he was invited back, he was "really doing something right", and hoped that he was reintroduced based on a positive first stint. On 28 March 2018, it was announced that Clay would reprise his role as Callum in spring 2018. Clay said that he looked forward to reprising the role, that Callum is "such a lovely role to play" and that he wanted to explore the character further. He had already begun filming when his return was publicised.

On 20 April, Sophie Dainty of Digital Spy reported that Callum would return in the episode broadcast on 30 April and teased that he may return with a secret. Further details about his return were released two days later, confirming that he would have a secret. It was reported that Whitney would be overjoyed when Callum returns but that she would notice that "Callum's mind seems to be elsewhere". Clay explained that it is evident from his return that something has happened to Callum, despite his efforts to hide this. He said that Callum wants to share his secret with Whitney as he is a good person and it "conflicts him a bit". The actor expressed how a main aspect to his character is that he does not like keeping secrets and wants to share everything with Whitney. Also, there is a clear change in Callum's personality when he returns, which is due to the secret. Clay thought it would be "exciting" for the audience to witness his journey.

In his return episode, it is shown that Callum has been wounded while in the Army. Johnathon Hughes of the Radio Times described Callum's injury as "a large, very painful-looking wound". The following episode sees Callum reveal to Whitney that he was hit by shrapnel while saving two children, leaving Whitney "taken aback by Callum's heroism". Dainty (Digital Spy) wondered whether Callum was "actually more shaken by his army ordeal than he's letting on". It was reported on 8 May 2018 that Callum would confess to Mick that he was lying about the incident in the Army. In the episodes that followed, Callum tells Mick that he caused another soldier to lose his leg when saving the children, but is "surprised and heartened" when Mick is not upset by the news.

Clay told Duncan Lindsay of the Metro that Callum returns to Albert Square, the show's setting, because he views it as a home and opined that "he's ever really had a place to call home, this is where he feels loved by Whitney and I think he feels like this is his family, this is his world now and I think this is what brings him back." On Mick and his wife, Linda Carter (Kellie Bright), offering Callum a room at their home, The Queen Victoria public house, as a thank you for helping them with their financial troubles, Clay explained that Callum wants to return to The Queen Vic and that after helping the Carters, he feels better about himself. He also noted that the Carters gave Callum "their word that they would always try to look after him whenever he needed it".

Callum's return to EastEnders and secret was placed at number four in Digital Spy's "big soap moments you have to see this week". A Soaplife journalist thought it was "typical" that he was hiding a secret when he returned. The Daily Express ran a poll for readers to vote on what they believed Callum's secret was: 39% of readers thought that Callum was "ashamed" of something that happened in the Army; 26% of readers were in the opinion that Callum had given his kidney to Aidan Maguire (Patrick Bergin) to repay him; 15% of readers believed that Callum left the Army; 13% were convinced that he had been stabbed; and the remaining 7% of readers thought it was something else. There was a positive reaction to his return on Twitter with fans excited that Callum and Whitney had been reunited.

=== Characterisation and appearance ===
During Callum's early appearances, his clothing style was described as consisting of "scruffy clothes and woolly headwear", and he sported a fringe that was deemed "mad" by Clay.

Callum's costume consists of "scruffy clothes and woolly headwear", mainly beanie hats, and he has a full fringe, which differs from Clay's appearance. Claire Crick of Digital Spy thought that Clay could not "look less like his character if he tried." Clay had his hair cut for the role of Callum as he thought it would suit his character. Clay described the hairstyle as "mad" and thought people sympathised with the character because of it. He hoped that Whitney would decide to take Callum for a better haircut.

When Callum returns to the show, he is 27 years old. Callum is a comedic character, which Laura Morgan of Digital Spy liked as she felt scenes including Callum were "always funnier [than those without him]". Crick believed that Clay's background in stand up comedy would be resourceful when portraying Callum. Clay also observed that Callum is comedic, which he thought was a nice characteristic. He explained that Callum tries to do good and wants to feel "included", and stated that Callum is a jovial character. He described Callum as "happy-go-lucky". Clay felt that although he and Callum shared similar mannerisms, he was not as "dopey" as his character. Callum often misinterprets moments with other people and says "things at the wrong time". Clay thought that this was Callum's biggest flaw, commenting, "He loves to put his foot in it!"

Morgan billed Callum as "hapless", "adorable" and "caring". She observed that Callum acts as "a bit of a dope" and in a silly manner, but is actually quite clever. In article about the character, Morgan expressed her hope that writers would not portray Callum as "a one-dimensional dumbass". Daniel Kilkelly of Digital Spy called Callum a "cheery soul". Brown (Radio Times) described Callum as "loveable" and a "cheeky chappie", while Hughes (Radio Times) called Callum a "chirpy chap" who is "troubled" when he returns. A Soaplife reporter described Callum as a "sweet and simple soldier", who is also slow-witted.

=== Relationships ===
==== Whitney Dean ====
Producers established a relationship for Callum when they paired him with Whitney Carter, who is Lee's ex-wife. Brown (Radio Times) said that Callum "anxiously prepares" for his date with Whitney. Rory O'Connor from the Daily Express said that Callum "gives Whitney a shock" when she thinks Callum is proposing marriage. Lindsay (Metro) reported that following the date, Callum continues to show his feelings for Whitney and starts "to win her round with his likeable personality." Clay said that although Callum is not Whitney's typical boyfriend, his effort and charm would impress her. He felt that his characteristics were more appealing to Whitney than his appearance. He added that the shared love between Callum and Whitney makes them a nice couple. Clay liked Callum and Whitney's relationship and looked forward to seeing it develop. When Callum arranges a second date, a romantic meal on the roof of The Queen Vic, Clay said, "It's that kind of thing that you fall in love with." He told Laura-Jayne Tyler of Inside Soap that his relationship with Whitney and the romantic meal helped alter the audience's opinion of Callum as it showed he is a "hopeless romantic". Tyler found Callum's location for the date amusing because in a recent storyline, Whitney's friend, Abi Branning (Lorna Fitzgerald), died after a fall from there. She described his actions as "thoughtful", but commented, "And they say romance is dead!" A journalist from Soaplife pointed out that Callum makes Whitney smile, which they said is not easy considering Whitney's relationship history. Callum Crumlish of the Daily Express described Callum and Whitney's relationship as "unlikely".

Following Callum's departure in February, Morgan hoped that producers planned to reintroduce the character by quitting his army job and returning to be in a relationship with Whitney. When he reappeared in the following episode and kissed Whitney, fans expressed their delight at the potential relationship.

In Callum's absence, Whitney's former boyfriend, Woody Woodward (Lee Ryan), returns to Walford. When Callum returns, he is not bothered by Woody's presence as he is not afraid of Whitney's former partners. Clay explained that Callum is "oblivious" to Woody because he is in love with Whitney and has the backing of the Carter family. Ben Lee of Digital Spy thought that Callum's return would be good for Whitney as it suggested that their relationship would continue, while Digital Spy's Laura Morgan thought that Callum would be the ideal partner for Whitney despite not matching the profile of her usual partner. Clay explained that Callum returns to Walford because he wants to develop his relationship with Whitney, which he treasures. He told Rachel Lucas of What's on TV that Callum sees his relationship with Whitney as "a new life". Callum's intimacy issues are explored through his relationship with Whitney when she tries to get intimate with him. Clay stated that this shows another dimension to his character. He explained that Callum struggles to connect with people and often misses prompts from other people, such as Whitney. On-screen, Callum reveals that he is struggling to be intimate with Whitney because he is a virgin. In April 2018, Clay stated that he was open to Callum and Whitney marrying, adding that he would love to film a soap wedding.

==== Other characters ====
As a friend of the Carter family, Callum shares many scenes with them. Morgan pointed out that he had become "an honorary Carter" and a "surrogate older son" for Mick and Linda in the absence of their sons, Lee and Johnny Carter (Ted Reilly), adding that Callum could be considered "a lucky charm for the continually-cursed Carters". Clay explained that the Carters help Callum feel like a member of their family. He described the Carter family as his "surrogate EastEnders family". He stated that everyone, in particular Bright, had looked after him after joining the show. Clay wanted to explore other parts of his character's personality and thought there was the opportunity to explore dramatic storylines for Callum.

Mick's mother, Shirley Carter (Linda Henry), calls Callum "Halfwit" in the show due to his dim-witted personality. Clay enjoyed the nickname, which he called "fun", and thought it was accurate at times. He explained that Callum accepts the nickname that Shirley has given him because although he understands that it is not the nickname associated with him, he does want to argue with Shirley. Clay said that he and Henry share a good relationship. When Callum returns and is offered Shirley's bedroom, he feels awkward about the situation because of Callum and Shirley's relationship, but Clay found the situation amusing.

When asked where he wanted his character to be in a year, Clay replied that he wanted his close relationships developed further. He added, "I'd like to just see him quite happy, but with a lot of stuff going on, a lot of fingers in different pies." Clay hoped that Lee would be reintroduced to the show and thought it would be "amazing" to see what would happen between Callum and Lee. Clay is familiar with Hatchard as they studied alongside each other. Clay told Kilkelly (Digital Spy) that there are several characters that he wants to star alongside, including Dot Branning (June Brown), the Slater family, Kim Fox-Hubbard (Tameka Empson) and Billy Mitchell (Perry Fenwick).

=== Family ===
Plans to introduce Callum's brother, Stuart Highway, were announced on 28 March 2018. Actor Ricky Champ was cast in the role of Stuart, who arrives in spring following Callum's return from the Army. Clay thought that Stuart's introduction supported Callum's presence on the show and found that it added a new "dynamic" to the character. He explained that Stuart's arrival would spark a change in Callum's attitude. Stuart is knowledgeable and cunning, which contrasts with Callum's dim-witted personality. He is also more confident than Callum. Clay believed that the differences in their personalities is evident. Sometimes, Callum admires his brother, but other times, he can feel untrusting of Stuart. Clay opined that their relationship is "quite Marmite at times". Clay told Duncan Lindsay of the Metro that Callum has "a need to feel included by his brother". Stuart and Mick are childhood friends, which Callum dislikes as he does not want Stuart to ruin his friendship with the Carter family. Stuart has a dark personality, which Clay thought would allow the audience to see "what makes Callum who he is". He expected the audience to pick up on moments of animosity between the brothers and warned them to be frightened of Stuart. Clay commented, "The relationship with his brother will be quite telling, and that'll be an interesting thing to watch." Producers used Stuart's introduction to explore Callum's backstory, specifically his childhood. Clay explained that Callum's childhood shaped his personality and confirmed that there would be an insight into a past event that has affected Callum.

== Storylines ==
Callum sends Mick Carter (Danny Dyer) a text message saying he is coming to his area. Callum later shoots Mick when he is robbing a van that Callum is in, not realising it was Mick under a mask. However, Callum recognises Mick and tries to help him by accompanying him to his home, The Queen Victoria public house, with his wife, Linda Carter (Kellie Bright), and mother, Shirley Carter (Linda Henry). It emerges Callum knows Mick and Linda because he was friends with their son, Lee Carter (Danny Hatchard), as a teenager. The following day, he offers his assistance in The Queen Vic as an apology, although annoys the Carters when he accidentally orders too much alcohol and breaks glasses. Tiffany Butcher (Maisie Smith) sets Callum up to spend time with her adoptive sister, Whitney Dean (Shona McGarty). Callum offers to buy Whitney food and makes her laugh, so she considers meeting him again. They arrange to meet for a drink in The Queen Vic, and Whitney turns up in casual clothes and wearing no makeup but Callum has prepared for a date, giving her a rose and having candles. He asks if she fancies him and then pulls a ring from his pocket, to which Whitney says she will not marry him but he says he only wants her to be his girlfriend. She turns him down and leaves, and he follows, leaving the ring behind. Mick finds the ring and has it valued at £20,000, telling Callum that he could use the money to buy back The Queen Vic, and Callum agrees, revealing that he found the ring during the robbery. When the ring turns out to be worth £200,000, Callum tells Mick to save his pub as long as there will always be a room for Callum if he needs it.

Whitney is touched when Callum recalls how his grandfather brought him up to treat women with respect. When Callum leaves for army duty, Whitney apologises to him and they share a sweet goodbye. After leaving his bag behind, he returns and passionately kisses Whitney, before leaving again. Callum and Whitney stay in contact via video calls. When Callum returns, he is hiding a wound from his abdomen but later tells Whitney that he was injured by shrapnel in an explosion. He and Whitney have sex for the first time. Callum reveals that he saved a child's life in the explosion and he is hailed a hero by the Carters, who throw him a party, but Callum dislikes the attention. Callum's brother, Stuart Highway (Ricky Champ) arrives and realises Callum is lying about his injury. Callum tells Mick that when he saved the child, his friend lost his legs and the child's mother was killed, but Mick says Callum was not to blame. Mick and Callum later assist Stuart in his work exposing paedophiles. Hoping to prove himself to Stuart, Callum confronts Fred Lewis (Malcolm Freeman), but lets him go when Mick threatens him with violence. When Linda finds out, she warns Mick and Callum that they could get hurt. Regardless, Callum tells Stuart that he wants to confront Fred again; Stuart confronts him instead and posts a video online about it.

After discovering that Stuart attacked Mick's aunt, Tina Carter (Luisa Bradshaw-White), when they were younger, the Carters reject Stuart and warn Callum to do the same. Stuart manipulates Callum into leaving the Carters and moving into his apartment; Callum tells the Carters that Stuart needs someone to believe him. Whitney visits Callum, who tells her that Tina attacked Stuart. After Whitney visits Stuart, he tells Callum that Whitney tried to kiss him; Callum ends their relationship. When Stuart confesses that he lied, Callum disowns him and leaves. After receiving a silent voicemail from Stuart, Callum panics that he is suicidal; he and Shirley visit Stuart's apartment where she finds a defaced photo of Callum. With Shirley's help, Whitney and Callum reunite. Callum meets Stuart and they argue. Stuart later asks for Callum's help and he protects Stuart from the Carters, claiming that he is in Dublin, as Stuart burns photos of Callum with the Carters. Stuart is later shot in The Queen Vic by an unknown assailant with Callum and the Carters being interviewed by the police. Shirley argues with Callum when she accuses him of shooting Stuart, which he denies. Stuart admits to Callum that he shot himself, before claiming that Mick shot him; Mick is arrested and Callum and the Carters vow to prove his innocence. Mick is later released, and Stuart is rejected by Callum.

Whitney and Callum panic when she tells him that she may be pregnant. Whitney turns out not to be pregnant, but they decide they would like a baby and they agree to try for one. Callum later tells Whitney they should put the baby on hold and save up to buy an apartment instead. Callum is called up to the army again and his doctor, Dr. Cosslett (Hywel Simons), deems him fit to return. Upset by the result of the assessment, Callum tries to harm himself, which is witnessed by Ben Mitchell (Max Bowden). Jay Brown (Jamie Borthwick) is impressed with Callum when he gets one of his clients, Mrs. Coombes (Jonna Wake), to upgrade her husband's funeral plan and offers him a job as an undertaker at the funeral parlour. Whitney and Callum also move into the apartment above the parlour.

Callum angrily confronts Ben over selling him a stolen van and it leads to a charged moment between the pair. Ben accuses Callum of being attracted to men as well as women, but he denies it. Ben tells Callum he should not hide who he is and they end up kissing. Still confused about his sexuality, Callum proposes to Whitney, who happily accepts. Callum later contacts his estranged father, Jonno Highway (Richard Graham), and he comes to Walford. Jonno berates Callum for his lifestyle and they fall out. Afterwards, Ben comforts Callum and kisses him, which Stuart witnesses. Stuart confronts Callum about the kiss, so Callum confesses; Stuart then attacks Ben.

The guilt over cheating on Whitney eats away at Callum. Not wanting to begin their life together with a secret hanging over them, Callum confesses to Whitney he cheated on her with Ben. Whitney is devastated, but she still decides to go through with the wedding. However, Whitney changes her mind and jilts Callum at the altar, telling him she loves him too much to let him live a lie. Later, Hunter Owen (Charlie Winter) holds the pub hostage, shooting Ben in the process. Callum decides to be open with everyone in his life; he tells Stuart he is gay and is accepted by him. Later at the hospital, Ben awakens and asks Callum on a date, to which he accepts.

== Reception ==
After his first few episodes, Gary Gillatt, writing for Inside Soap, hoped that Callum would stay in the show because of his "tons of charisma". Reporters from Digital Spy liked the character, with Laura Morgan calling him "the kind of light comic relief we've all needed at the start of 2018." Morgan's colleague, Ben Lee, described Callum's initial stint on the show as "a very eventful few weeks", while Daniel Kilkelly and Sophie Dainty pointed out that Callum had "proved popular with fans" during his initial stint on EastEnders. Morgan found the character funny and liked his "infectious energy and warmth". She compared him to former character Fatboy (Ricky Norwood) and thought that he could become Dot Branning's (June Brown) lodger, as Fatboy was. On Clay's performance as Callum, Morgan opined, "It's never easy being the new fish in such a famous big pond, but he's settled in more quickly than most, and made the part of Callum 100% his own." Tyler of Inside Soap opined that Callum is "the real treasure to emerge from the bonkers plot [the heist storyline]". She added, "Square chiefs had clearly found a diamond in the rough with actor Tony Clay". Rachel Lucas of What's on TV described Callum as the "unlikely villain [who] shot Mick Carter during Aidan Maguire's botched robbery! But he redeemed himself by helping Mick Carter save The Vic and then he won Whitney Carter's heart." A Soaplife columnist called Callum "a welcome ray of sunshine in the bleak world of Albert Square".

Clay said that after his first appearance, he received "a few looks" from members of the public and several messages from fans on Twitter asking "Dude, what have you done?", as people believed that he had shot Mick. He recalled the first time that he was recognised in public, calling it "quite surreal" and "an odd moment". He added that he received positive feedback from the audience after becoming embedded into the cast. Clay told Tyler of Inside Soap that when a fan recognised him on the train, he did not know how to react, but explained that he was friendly and took a photo with her.

For his portrayal of Callum, Clay was nominated for Best Soap Newcomer at the 2018 Digital Spy Reader Awards; he came in seventh place with 5.4% of the total votes. His introduction was also nominated for "Most Bizarre Soap Storyline"; he came in sixth place with 8% of the total votes.

== See also ==
- List of LGBTQ characters in soap operas
