= Tony Clay =

English actor (b. 1991)

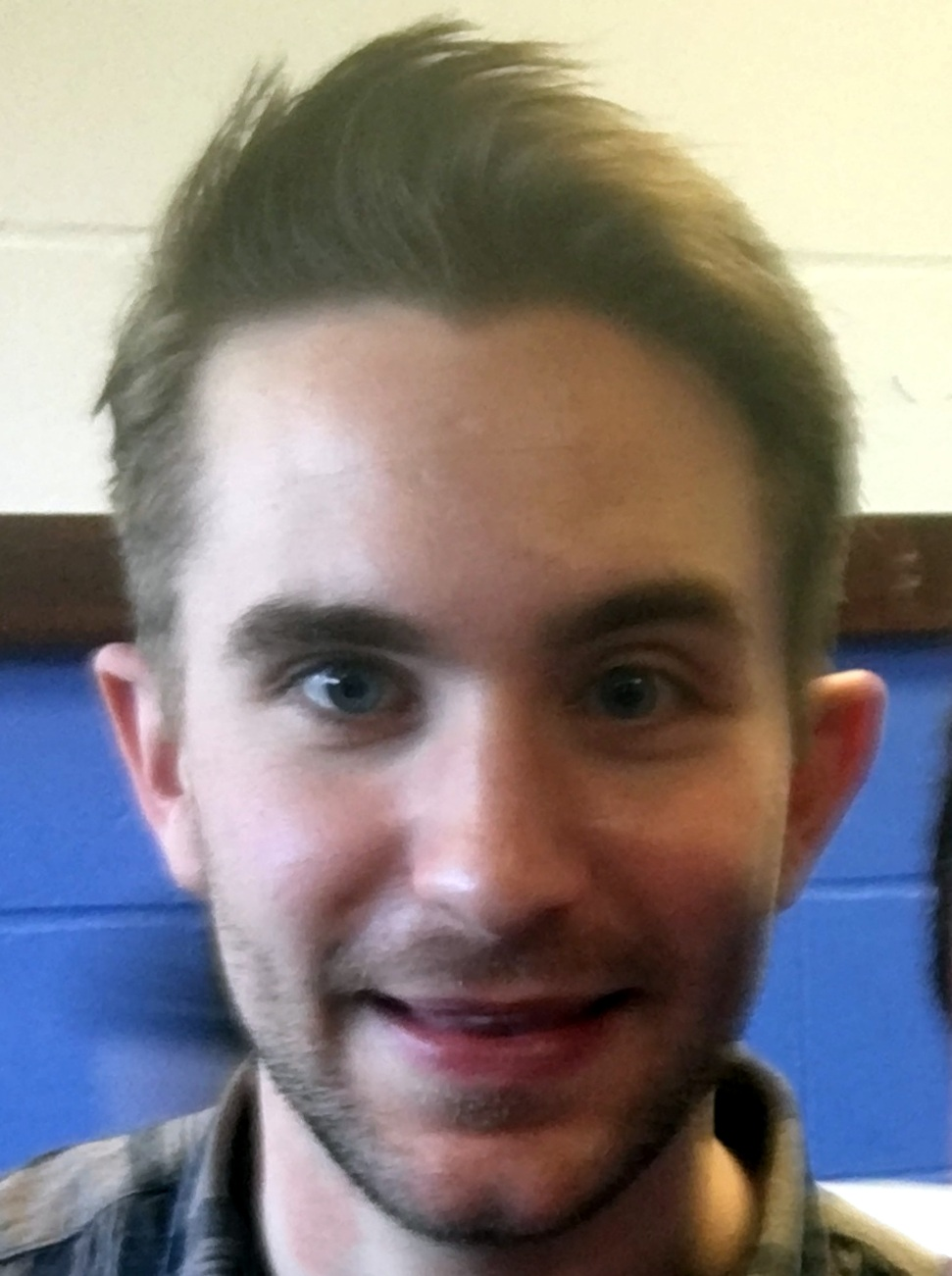
- Clay in 2018
- Born: Tony David Clay; 8 August 1991 (age 34); Bexley, Kent, England
- Occupation: Actor
- Years active: 2012–present
- Television: EastEnders
- Partner: Olivia Griffin (2016–present)

Tony David Clay (born 8 August 1991) is an English actor. He is known for playing Callum Highway in the BBC soap opera EastEnders since 2018. Prior to his tenure on EastEnders, Clay appeared in various stage productions and had minor roles in British films and programmes.

== Early life and education ==
Clay was born in Bexley, Greater London on 8 August 1991 to Christopher and Suzanne Clay. He attended North Kent College, Dartford doing Drama at the Miskin Theatre. He also attended the Arts Educational Schools, London and graduated with a BA in acting in 2013.

== Career ==
Clay's first role was in a short film called An Ordinary Life in 2012. In 2017, he played the role of Woody Gilbert in the show Stan Lee's Lucky Man. He has also appeared in Foyle's War and several theatre productions.

In January 2018, Clay joined the cast of EastEnders as Callum Highway and is introduced as a friend of the Carter family. During his initial stint on the show, the character is depicted as a "happy-go-lucky" character who wears shabby clothing and beanie hats. Originally contracted for two months, Clay reprised the role in April 2018 and since then the character's storylines have included a relationship with Whitney Dean (Shona McGarty), the introduction of the Callum's brother Stuart Highway (Ricky Champ) and the character coming out as gay and beginning a relationship with Ben Mitchell (Max Bowden).

== Personal life ==
Clay has been in a relationship with Olivia Griffin since August 2016.

== Filmography ==
=== Feature film ===
Year	Title	Role	Notes
2014	Second Coming	Cash-4-Gold Sign Man	

=== Short film ===
Year	Title	Role	Notes
2012	An Ordinary Life	Kieran	

=== Television ===
Year	Title	Role	Notes
2015	Foyle's War	Rex Carter	Episode: "Elise"
2017	Stan Lee's Lucky Man	Woody Gilbert	Episode: "The Trojan Horse"
2018–present	EastEnders	Callum Highway	Regular role
2020	EastEnders: Secrets from the Square	Himself	Episode: "Ben and Callum"

== Stage ==
Year	Title	Role	Venue	Director	Author/Playwright
2009	The Machine Wreckers	Ned Lud	Miskin Theatre	Nick Bagnall	Ernst Toller
2014	Albion	Jason	Bush Theatre	Ria Parry	Chris Thompson
2015	Lines	Locke	The Yard Theatre	Jay Miller	Pamela Carter
2016	The Plough and the Stars	Sergeant Tinley	Abbey Theatre / US Tour	Sean Holmes	Seán O'Casey
Unknown	Fifteen Minutes With You	Unknown	Wimbledon College of Arts	Dan Bird	Unknown
Unknown	The Wonderful World of Dissocia	Goat/Violinist	Arts Educational Schools	Will Oldroyd	Anthony Neilson
Unknown	A Midsummer Night's Dream	Lysander	Arts Educational Schools	John Abbott	William Shakespeare
Unknown	Earthquakes in London	Colin	Arts Educational Schools	Dan Bird	Mike Bartlett
Unknown	Promise	Jay 2	Arts Educational Schools	Cressida Brown	Unknown
Unknown	All My Sons	Keller	Arts Educational Schools	Janette Smith	Arthur Miller
Unknown	Ivanov	Lvov	Arts Educational Schools	Gareth Farr	Anton Chekhov
Unknown	Someone Who'll Watch Over Me	Edward	Arts Educational Schools	John Abbott	Frank McGuinness

== Awards and nominations ==
Year	Award	Category	Result	Ref.
2018	Inside Soap Awards	Funniest Male	Nominated	
2018	Inside Soap Awards	Best Newcomer	Shortlisted	
2018	I Talk Telly Awards	Best Soap Newcomer	Nominated	
2018	Digital Spy Reader Awards	Best Soap Newcomer	Seventh	
2020	Inside Soap Awards	Best Partnership (shared with Max Bowden)	Nominated	
2020	I Talk Telly Awards	Best Soap Partnership (shared with Bowden)	Nominated	
2020	Digital Spy Reader Awards	Best Couple (shared with Bowden)	Won	
2021	The Version Soap Awards	Best Couple (shared with Bowden)	Won	
2021	26th National Television Awards	Serial Drama Performance	Nominated	
2021	I Talk Telly Awards	Best Soap Partnership (shared with Bowden)	Nominated	
