= Clair Norris =

English actress (born 1997)

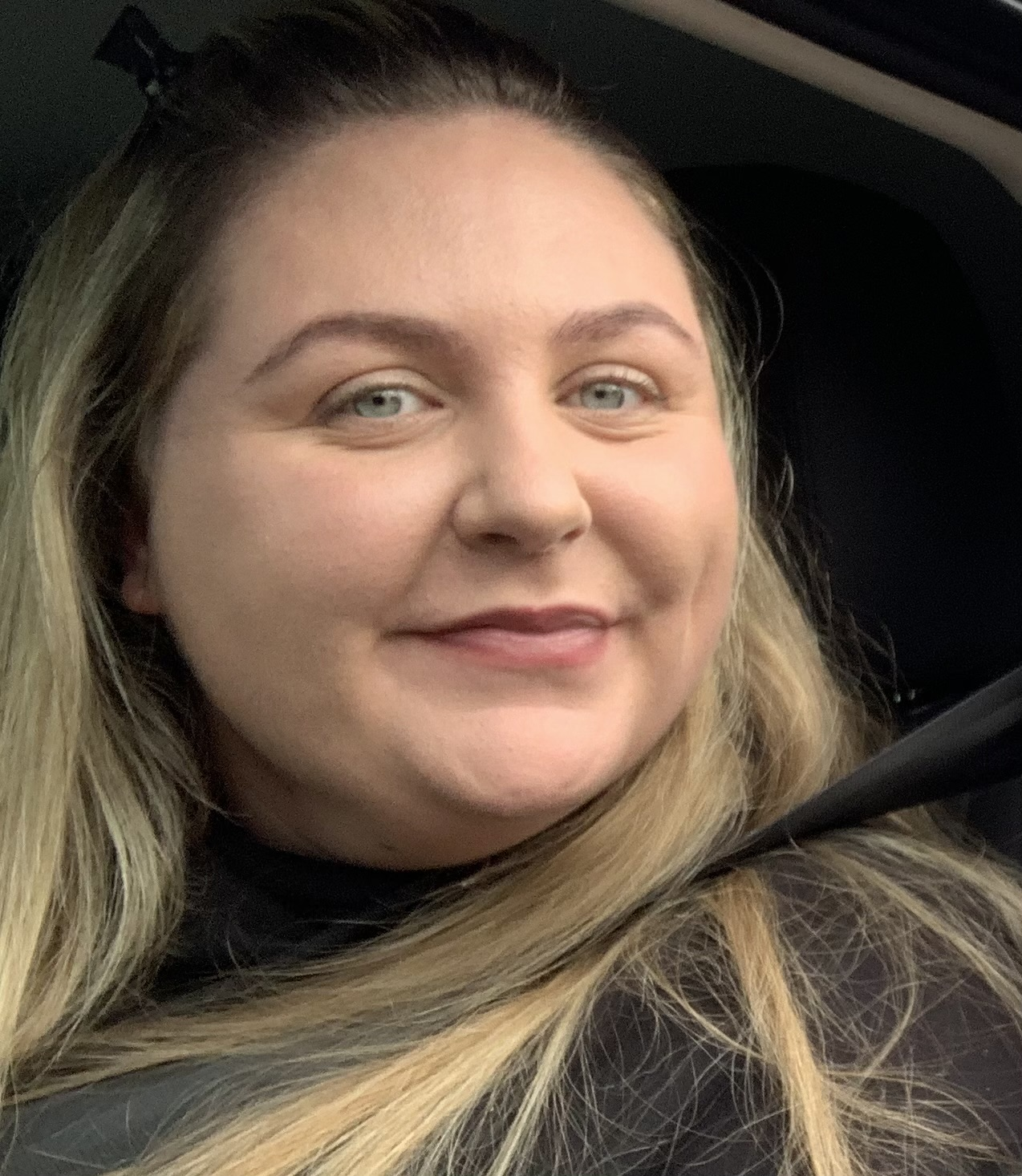
- Norris in 2023
- Born: Clair Hayley Norris; 30 December 1997 (age 28); London, United Kingdom
- Occupation: Actress
- Years active: 2017–present
- Television: EastEnders

Clair Hayley Norris (born 30 December 1997) is a British actress from London, known for portraying the role of Bernadette Taylor on the BBC soap opera EastEnders between 2017 and 2025. While on the series, she has also made appearances in series including Bloods and Tell Me Everything, as well as fronting a Panorama documentary about obesity.

== Early life ==
Clair Hayley Norris was born on 30 December 1997 in Greenwich, London, and went on to attend Miskin Theatre at North Kent College.

== Career ==
=== 2017-2025 ===
In 2017, Norris was cast in the BBC soap opera EastEnders as Bernadette Taylor, the daughter in the newly introduced Taylor family. Her character's storylines on the show have included a teenage pregnancy which resulted in a miscarriage, before coming out as a lesbian, being a surrogate and getting a job at the café. Norris took a five month break from the show in October 2021 and returned in March 2022.

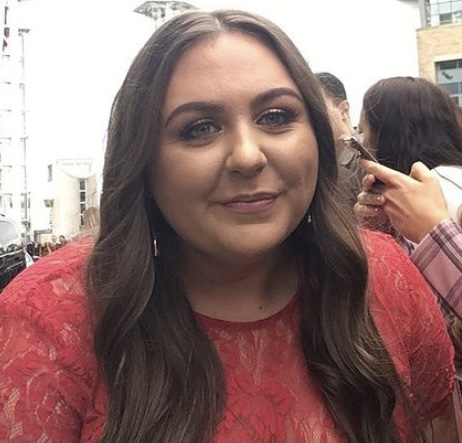
Norris in 2019

In December 2021, Norris appeared as a contestant on The Weakest Link. She was voted off after incorrectly answering a question about the name of Cheryl's son.

In March 2022, Norris appeared in an episode of the Sky Comedy series Bloods as a drunk girl. In April 2022, Norris starred in a BBC documentary for Panorama titled Obesity: Who Cares if I'm Bigger?. The documentary followed Norris, who is overweight herself, meeting various people on a weight management scheme, a 'man-versus-fat' football team, and a dancer who runs classes for plus-size women, ultimately discussing whether the prime minister's strategy to help the nation lose weight was working. It was praised by viewers for the stories that featured, whilst Norris was accredited for her "warmth and sensitivity" and commended for her "skillful handling of a complex disease". In December 2022, Norris appeared in an episode of the ITVX teen drama Tell Me Everything as Kerry.

In May 2025, it was announced that Norris had been axed from EastEnders after eight years and that Bernadette would leave later that year.

== Personal life ==
Norris has been in a relationship with Lewis Wood since 2018.

== Filmography ==
Year	Title	Role	Notes	Ref.
2017–2025	EastEnders	Bernadette Taylor	559 episodes	
2021	The Weakest Link	Herself	Contestant	
2022	Bloods	Drunk Girl	1 episode	
2022	Obesity: Who Cares if I'm Bigger?	Herself	Panorama documentary	
2022	Tell Me Everything	Kerry	1 episode	
