= Max Bowden =

English actor (born 1994)

- Born: Max Lewis Bowden; 31 December 1994 (age 31); Woking, Surrey, England
- Occupation: Actor
- Years active: 2006–present
- Television: Waterloo Road; EastEnders
- Children: 1

Max Lewis Bowden (born 31 December 1994) is an English actor. He is best known for his roles as Justin Fitzgerald in the BBC One school-based drama series Waterloo Road (2014–2015), and his portrayal of Ben Mitchell in the BBC soap opera EastEnders (2019–2025).

== Career ==
In 2014, Bowden joined the cast of Waterloo Road in the role of Justin Fitzgerald. In 2016, he played Kash Ryland in the BBC medical drama Casualty.

From April 2019 to March 2024, Bowden portrayed Ben Mitchell in the BBC soap opera EastEnders. In August 2025, it was announced that Bowden would return to EastEnders for a short stint in the autumn.

== Filmography ==
List of Max Bowden television credits
Year	Title	Role	Notes	Ref.
2006	Demolition Dad	Naughty Neighbour		
2014–2015	Waterloo Road	Justin Fitzgerald	Main role	
2016	Saved	Peter	Episode: "Car Impaling/Kayak"	
2016	Casualty	Kash Ryland	Episode: "A Clear Conscience"	
2016	Doctors	William King	Episode: "The Da Vinci Toad"	
2019–2025	EastEnders	Ben Mitchell	Regular role	

== Stage ==
List of Max Bowden stage credits
Year	Title	Role	Venue	Director(s)	Ref.
2015	Birdsong	Private Tipper	Original Theatre Company	Rachel Wagstaff	
2020	Birdsong	Private Tipper	Original Theatre Online	Rachel Wagstaff, Alastair Whatley, Charlotte Peters	
2020	The Haunting of Alice Bowles	Matt	Original Theatre Online	Philip Franks	
2024/2025 UK tour	Birdsong	Jack Firebrace	Original Theatre Company	Alastair Whatley	

== Awards and nominations ==
List of Max Bowden awards and nominations
Year	Award	Category	Result	Ref.
2019	Inside Soap Awards	Best Newcomer	Nominated	
2019	Inside Soap Awards	Best Bad Boy	Won	
2020	National Television Awards	Newcomer	Nominated	
2020	TV Choice Awards	Best Soap Actor	Nominated	
2020	Inside Soap Awards	Best Actor	Nominated	
2022	I Talk Telly Awards	Best Soap Performance	Won	
2023	Inside Soap Awards	Soap Superstar	Won	
